= Mike Colandro =

American professional golfer (1953–2015)

Personal information
- Full name: Michael Violette Colandro
- Nationality: United States
- Born: May 27, 1953 Hartford, Connecticut, U.S.
- Died: August 9, 2015 (aged 62)

Career
- Sport: Golf
- Turned professional: 1975
- Former tour: PGA Tour of Australasia
- Professional wins: 11

Number of wins by tour
- PGA Tour of Australasia: 1
- Other: 10

Best results in major championships
- Masters Tournament: DNP
- PGA Championship: DNP
- U.S. Open: CUT: 1986, 1993
- The Open Championship: CUT: 1984

Michael Violette Colandro (May 27, 1953 – August 9, 2015) was an American professional golfer. Colandro played briefly on the PGA Tour in 1979 and 1980 but did not have much success. In 1981, he started to play on the PGA Tour of Australia. Despite multiple personal tragedies, a rancorous relationship with rules officials, and a precarious exemption status he was able to play 16 consecutive seasons on the Australian tour, culminating with his only official tour victory, the 1987 Air New Zealand Shell Open. In 1995, he largely retired as a touring professional. He still worked in the golf industry, however, as a swing instructor, creator of golf-related DVDs-CDs, and charity fundraiser, while also working on a self-published autobiography, Almost an Aussie.

== Early life ==
Colandro was born in 1953. He was of Italian descent. Colandro was from Hartford, Connecticut. Colandro's father, Al, was an assistant pro at Wampanoag Country Club in West Hartford, Connecticut. He also had a brother, Albert, and a sister, Maryann. Albert occasionally served as Colandro's caddy as an adult. Colandro was afflicted with Diabetes type II throughout his life.

In his youth, Colandro started his golf career as a caddy. He was a caddy at Rockledge Golf Club in West Hartford and some other clubs in the area. In his spare time, Colandro would play these courses as well. In general, however, Colandro largely honed his skills at Goodwin Park Golf Course in Hartford.

Colandro grew up in Newington, Connecticut. During the 1968–69 school year, as a freshman at Newington High School, Colandro began playing for the golf team. He immediately began as a "starter." During his sophomore year, however, Colandro could not play on the golf team due to "double sessions at school."

In the summer of 1970, Colandro received media attention for the first time. In July, he played the Connecticut State Golf Association Junior Championship at Watertown Golf Club in Watertown, Connecticut. Colandro won his first two matches of the event and reached the quarterfinals. In the quarterfinals he played William Reklaitis of Rockledge Golf Club. Colandro was 2 up at the turn and remained two holes up with two to play. However, Reklaitis won the 17th and 18th holes, including a birdie at the last, to send it to extra holes. Colandro, though, birdied the first extra hole to win the match. In the semifinals he played "tournament medalist" Paul Maloney. Colandro quickly fell behind, 3 down at the turn. Colandro birdied the 10th hole to get closer but Maloney won a number of holes in the middle of the back nine to assure the win. Maloney won it 3 & 2. Later in the year, in September, Colandro played the Hartford District Amateur. At the end of regulation, Colandro was tied with five other players for the lead. They played an 18-hole playoff to determine the champion. Colando won it. He was believed to be the youngest-ever winner of the event. Colandro graduated from Newington High School in 1972.

== Amateur career ==
Shortly after graduating high school, Colandro attended Arizona State University. He was on the golf team. The team included future PGA Tour pros Howard Twitty, Bob Gilder, and Tom Purtzer. Colandro was there from 1972 to 1974. But in late 1974 "there was a falling-out with the coach" and Colandro dropped out of school.

Colandro soon started working as a caddy on the PGA Tour at the beginning of the 1975 season. He worked for Marty Fleckman and Rick Rhodes. In the summer he returned to Connecticut and played in some notable events. In July he played the New England Public Links. He opened with a 71, one of only two players to match par, and take the joint lead. In addition, his Goodwin Park team was in second place. Colandro shot a one-under-par 70 in the second round to win medalist honors. As a team, Goodwin Park finished in second place, two back of the host team, Hubbard Heights. In August he played the Hartford District Amateur, the event he won five years previous. Colandro was considered one of the favorites. Like in 1970, he won the event. In September he played the Manchester Open, a professional event. He shot an even-par 72 to achieve low amateur honors. Champion Wayne Levi and runner-up Don Bierkan were among the few professionals to defeat him. During the year he also won the Victor Riccio Tournament. He was generally regarded as one of the best amateur golfers in Connecticut during this era.

== Professional career ==
=== Early career and PGA Tour ===
In October 1975, Colandro turned professional. Colandro attempted to qualify for the PGA Tour at Fall 1975 PGA Tour Qualifying School. However, he was unsuccessful. Colandro remained in Florida for the winter and played on the state's mini-tours. For the next two summers Colandro worked at a driving range in Ellington, Connecticut. Colandro again attempted to make it onto the PGA Tour at Fall 1977 PGA Tour Qualifying School but was again unsuccessful. Colandro was, in his words, at a "crossroads" in his life and decided to move to Las Vegas, Nevada where his aunt lived. He ultimately got a job as an assistant pro at Sahara Country Club. In early 1979 he started playing the local mini-tours. In mid-May he again began another attempt to earn playing privileges for the PGA Tour. The Western regionals for the Spring 1979 PGA Tour Qualifying School were held at the PGA West Stadium Course in Rancho Mirage, California. Colando shot 292 (+4) to finish in a tie for 25th place and earn rights to play in final qualifying by two strokes. In June, he played the finals at Pinehurst No. 6 in North Carolina. Over the course of the 72 hole tournament, Colandro shot 295 to earn rights to play on the PGA Tour.

Colandro soon started playing on the PGA Tour. His first event was the Danny Thomas-Memphis Classic in late June. Colandro shot rounds of 75 (+3) and 73 (+1) to miss the cut. Two weeks he played the Greater Milwaukee Open. He opened with a 68 to put him within two of the lead. However, he shot an 80 to miss the cut by a wide margin. A month later Colandro missed the cut at his hometown event, the Greater Hartford Open, by one stroke. Colandro continued to miss cuts. However, at his last event of the year, the San Antonio Texas Open, he shot a 67 (−3) to make his first cut. Colandro earned $497.50, his first check on the PGA Tour. Due to his poor play over the course of the year, however, Colandro had to return to the PGA Tour Qualifying Tournament. He easily made it through regionals and then played the finals again at Pinehurst. At the Fall 1980 PGA Tour Qualifying School he opened with rounds of 76-76-72 to put him within one of the cut-off figure. However, "still struggling somewhat with a new swing," Colandro shot an 84 to ultimately miss the cut-off by a wide margin.

Although a "non-card-carrying member" of the PGA Tour in 1980, Colandro was still able to compete in up to 10 tournaments during the year. At the beginning of the 1980 season, Colandro attempted to qualify for the Phoenix Open and Bing Crosby National Pro-Am but failed. He managed to get into the Andy Williams-San Diego Open Invitational but missed the cut. However, later in the West Coast swing, at the Hawaiian Open, Colandro had more success. He opened the tournament with rounds of 72-70-69. In the final round he was paired with Arnold Palmer and Bill Calfee. On Sunday, Colandro shot four-under-par over the first 10 holes to put him at nine-under-par for the tournament. It was the best aggregate score he had in any tournament in his career to that point. He was anxious and conferred with playing partner Palmer on what to do. Palmer advised him to not be complacent and push forward and achieve a better score. Colandro, however, had a "struggling finish," double-bogeying the 13th hole and ultimately recording a 71 (−1). At 282 (−6) he finished in a tie for 42nd. Despite the disappointing close, it was his best result of his PGA Tour career so far. A month later, Colandro opened well at the Doral-Eastern Open. He shot a first round 71 to put him near the top ten. However, he shot a second round 79 to miss the cut. For the remainder of the year Colandro did not have much success, failing to make the cut in any of his subsequent PGA Tour events, including his hometown event, the Greater Hartford Open.

=== PGA Tour of Australia ===
In 1981, Colandro decided to play in Australia. It was his first year playing the PGA Tour of Australia. Colandro formed a company, the MC Company, to help fund his tour of Australia. In October, he played the New South Wales PGA Championship. He finished in solo ninth place. Two weeks later he played the West Lakes Classic. He opened with a 72 to put himself near the top ten. He finished in a tie for 14th. The following week he played the New South Wales Open. He opened with even-par rounds of 73 to put himself near the lead. However, on the weekend he followed with rounds of 76 to finish outside of the top ten. By early November, Colandro had played in six events and made the cut in all of them. He finished his first season in Australia ranked inside the top 50 on the Order of Merit. In February 1982, Colandro played the Australian Masters. He shot three-under-par for the first two days to put him in joint second place, three back of Bob Shearer's lead. However, in the third round he shot a 78 and "dropped out of the reckoning." He finished in a tie for 21st. Later in the year he started playing some events on the Asia Golf Circuit.

Shortly thereafter, Colandro returned to the United States. In late June 1982, Colandro played the Massachusetts Open. The event was held at Longmeadow Country Club in Longmeadow, Massachusetts. In the second round he shot an even-par 70 to become a "challenger" to leader Dana Quigley, finishing the round in solo second place. However, he "soared" to a two-over-par 72 in the third round to "slip into a second place tie" with Bob Menne. In late July, Colandro began play at the Miller High Life-Greater Bangor Open. After two rounds Colandro was at 142 (+2), three back of leader Jeff Sluman. However, he was unable to break par in the final round, shooting a 72 (+2), to finish at 214 (+4), in a tie for fifth place. He won $700. In August, Colandro attempted to qualify for his hometown event, Sammy Davis Jr. - Greater Hartford Open. However, he was not successful.

In the early 1980s, Colandro continued to play in Australia. He had his first high finishes in Australia during this era. In late November 1982, he played the New Zealand Open. He opened with rounds of 73 and 71 to put himself at even-par, in fifth place. However, Colandro shot a third round 75 to shoot himself out of contention. However, he shot a final round 71 (−1) for solo third place. Colandro's round was one of only four sub-par rounds for the day. In October 1983, he had much success at the National Panasonic New South Wales Open. He did not play particularly well at the beginning of the tournament, however, opening with rounds of 72 (+1) and 78 (+7). However, in the third round he shot a 67 (−4). This turned out of be joint best round of the tournament with Greg Norman who also shot 67 that round. In the final round he shot a 72 (+1) to finish in a tie for 8th. In early November, Colandro played in a pro-am at Royal Melbourne Golf Club, shooting a 69, finishing in a tie for fourth. The next week Colandro played the Victorian PGA Championship. After two rounds he was at 143 (−1). On Friday night of the tournament, he learned his father died. He continued to play, however, stating that "his father would have wanted him to play." On Saturday, during the third round, he shot a 68 (−4) to put him only three shots off of the lead. Colandro ultimately finished in solo fourth place, four back of champion Vaughan Somers.

As of February 1984, Colandro had returned to the United States. During this era, Colandro was a teaching pro at Laurel View Golf Club in Hamden, Connecticut. Early in the year, he played the PGA Club Pro Series at Plantation Club Resort in Crystal River, Florida. Colandro finished at six-under-par 138, in a tie for sixth place, four back of champion Kirk Hanefeld. In the spring he began playing on the Tournament Players Series, satellite tour of the PGA Tour. In early June, he attempted to qualify for the 1984 U.S. Open. The event proper was going to held at Winged Foot Golf Club at Mamaroneck, New York. The final qualifying event was held in New Jersey. Colandro played well for most of the event and was on the mark to qualify. However, he shot a 40 on the final nine to miss qualifying by a shot. A few days later, Colandro started playing the two-round Hellawell Cadillac-Oldsmobile Pro-am. The event was held at Pittsfield Country Club in Pittsfield, Massachusetts. Colandro opened with a 68 (−2) to take a two-stroke lead. Fran Marello, a friend of Colandro's from his junior golf days in Connecticut, "put on a little pressure," shooting a final round 69 (−1). However, Colandro "nailed down the victory" at the 16th hole, hitting a wedge shot to three feet to assure birdie. With his 67 (−3), he won by four strokes over Marello. In addition, Colandro's pro-am team also won the group competition. In July, Colandro successfully earned entry into the 1984 British Open. The event was held at St Andrews Golf Club in Saint Andrews, Scotland. However, he missed the cut. The following week, Colandro played the Miller High Life-Greater Bangor Open again. The event was held at Bangor Municipal Golf Course. At the par-70 course, Colandro shot rounds of 67 and 70 to put him in a tie for second, four back of the lead held by Fran Marrello. In the final round, Colandro played in the final group with Marrello and Chip Hall. Over the course of the front nine, however, he shot two-over-par to fall into a tie for third. He ultimately shot a 74 (+4) to finish in a tie for 5th place.

In late 1984, Colandro returned to Australia. Early in the 1984–85 season he recorded a number of top finishes that put him at the edge of the top ten. In late October, he played the New South Wales Open. He shot a third round 71 (−2) to move near the top ten. He shot an even-par 73 the following day to finish T-7. In the first week of November he played the Australian PGA Championship. He shot three rounds in the low 70s to put himself in the top ten entering the final round. He finished in a tie for 11th. Four days later he opened with a 69 at the Victorian PGA Championship to put himself in the top ten. He finished in a tie for 10th. The following week he matched "par figures" at the Australian Open to finish in solo 10th place. The following week he was considered among the favorites at the Honeywell Classic. He opened with a 71 (−2) to put him near the top ten. He followed with a 70 (−3) to stay on the leaderboard. He finished in a tie for 11th at 284 (−8).

Late in season he seriously contested to win several tournaments. In mid-December, Colandro received much media attention for his play at the Queensland PGA Championship. He opened with a 71 (−1), scoring six birdies. He "continued his run of birdies" with four more in the second round. With a 70 (−2) he took the lead. Colandro had a chance to maintain to lead on Saturday. However, he "threw away his chance," missing an "easy" putt on the 16th and then bogeying the 17th hole. He was two behind leaders Peter Fowler and Ossie Moore. On Sunday, Colandro played in the final group. He was two-over-par through the first 16 holes but was still "in the running" for the championship, one behind leader Ian Baker-Finch. However, he bogeyed the par-4 17th to lose any hope. He finished in third place. In February, Colandro played well at the Victorian Open. After two rounds he was at 141, in a tie for 5th place. After three rounds he was at 213 (−3), in a tie for third place, only behind leader Baker-Finch and second place holder David Graham. He shot an even-par round of 72 on Sunday to finish in solo fifth place. The following week he played the Australian Masters. After three rounds he was at 221, in a tie for ninth. However, he played poorly in the final round, shooting a 77, to finish in a tie for 18th. In April, Colandro played the three-round Ansett Yarra Yarra Easter Classic. He opened with rounds of 68 and 74 to put him near the lead. In the final round he shot a 72 to finish tied with Robert Stephens at the end of regulation. They finished one ahead of Mark Nash, Bob Shearer, and amateur Tim Elliiot. Colandro and Stephens played a sudden-death playoff to decide the championship. The playoff would begin on the 10th hole. On the first playoff hole, Colandro's drive "landed in the trees" and his approach went into a bunker. Stephens, meanwhile, "comfortably" made the green in regulation. Colandro had an 11-metre bunker shot. He stated later, "It was a very hard shot with a capital V-E-R-Y." However, Colandro holed the shot for birdie. Stephens could not match him and Colandro won the tournament. Afterwards Colandro stated, "I didn't expect to hole the ball, I was just hoping to get it up there so I could get it in for par. You just don't get bunker shots like that in. But as soon as I hit it I thought it had a chance." Later in the month, he also won the Bendigo pro-am.

Colandro returned to the United States. In the summer, he told the Bangor Daily News, "This is a big year for me. I have to be realistic. I've been guilty about not thinking about the future the last few years. I've set a lot of short-term goals, but I've never set long-term goals. I'm at the point where I'm saying you've either got to start winning now, or start looking for other things to do in your life." In early August he played the three-round Miller High Life-Greater Bangor Open. Colandro had an up and down day but birdied the final hole to finish at one-under-par, near the lead. In the second round he shot an even-par 70 to stay close to the lead. In the final round, however, Colandro bogeyed the first two holes to fall out of it. He ultimately shot a 73 (+3) and finished in a tie for solo fourth, nine behind champion Jeff Lewis.

As of mid-October 1985, Colandro had returned to Australia. In November, he played the Victorian PGA Championship at Warrnambool Golf Club Warrnambool, Australia. Colandro was one-over-par at the midway point of the tournament. However, in the third round he played excellently, shooting a "scintillating" nine-under-par 63, breaking the course record. He moved into a tie for third place. Colandro stated it was his "best-ever round in competition." However, on Sunday he fired an "ordinary" 74 (+2). He finished in a tie for fourth place. For the remainder of the year, Colandro had much success at minor tournaments. A few days later after his success at Warrnambool, Colandro began preparations to play the Australian Open. In the event's pro-am he shot a one-over-par 73 at the "demanding" Royal Melbourne course, only behind medalists Tom Watson and Mike Cahill and third place holders Terry Gale and Ian Stanley. Two weeks later, in late November, he played well at the U-Bix Classic pro-am, shooting a three-under-par 70, finishing in a tie for third place. In December, he played the two-round Eastwood pro-am at Eastwood Golf Club in Kilsyth, Victoria. With consecutive rounds of even-par 72 he won the event by two strokes over Rob McNaughton. He finished 1985 ranked 19th on the Order of Merit, his best performance so far. Despite this success, Colandro was beginning to receive negative press coverage for his antagonistic behavior at golf tournaments. Over the course of the 1985 season, he received a number of "hefty fines" for failing to control his "temper" at tournaments. In addition, Colandro was becoming known for his confrontational behavior with rules officials. According to the Canberra Times, he had "numerous run-ins with officialdom" in the mid-1980s.

In early 1986 he had some success at more significant events. In February, he opened with rounds of 71 at the Victorian Open to put himself near the top ten. He closed with rounds of 73 and 69 to finish in a tie for fifth, four back of champion Ossie Moore. In early March he played the Rich River Golf Classic. In the third round he opened with a "stunning run" of four consecutive birdies. He ultimately shot a 68 (−3) finished the round tied with Rodger Davis for second place. He closed with an even-par 71 to finish solo third. It was his last event of the season. Around this time, Colandro was thinking about becoming a member of the Victorian PGA and moving permanently to Melbourne, Australia. During this era, he was engaged to Georgia Eames, a model from Melbourne. He was currently in 8th place on the PGA Tour of Australia's Order of Merit. His goals thereafter were to win a "major" tournament on the Australian tour.

Shortly after the season ended, however, tragedy struck. On March 10, Colandro was driving a car in Melbourne with his fiancée, Eames. The car "skidded off the road and into a pole." Eames was "killed instantly." Colandro stated a few months later, "She was crushed to death and had to have a closed casket. I should have been crushed to death, too, or mangled at best... They had to pry her out of the car and I got off scot-free." Colandro was "devastated" by her death. Much later, friends stated that the event "took a lot out of Mike."

Ten days after the accident, Colandro returned to the United States. During this time he was an assistant professional at the Country Club of Waterbury in Waterbury, Connecticut. In early June, Colandro began his qualifying attempt for the 1986 U.S. Open. The two-round sectional qualify event was held at two different golf courses in Purchase, New York. There were 27 slots open to advance to the event proper. In the morning round, at Century Country Club, Colandro opened with a one-over-par-71. However, at the afternoon round at Old Oaks Country Club, he "struggled." He was over-par early, made bogeys at the 13th and 14th holes, and then missed a 20-foot par putt at the last. Colandro said he was so "upset" by his finish that, in his own words, he wanted "to throw up all over the place." However, at the last minute Colando got into a 3-for-5 playoff to determine who got the last three slots. With a "routine par 4" on the first playoff hole Colandro moved onto the U.S. Open with Brett Upper and Peter Oosterhuis. The event proper was held at Shinnecock Hills Golf Club in Southampton, New York. Colandro opened poorly in the first round with an 80 (+10), including double bogeys on the 10th and 12th holes. Colandro's poor play was due to, in his words, "lost concentration and a couple of poor swings. You can shoot a high number when that happens." He responded with a 76 (+6) and missed the cut by a wide margin. Colandro was not particularly discouraged by the result, however. "It wasn't a bad effort considering that for a few months I didn't really know what my life was about," he said later, referencing the recent death of his fiancée. Late in the summer he won two state opens. In early August, Colandro played the three-round Connecticut Open at Hartford Golf Club. It was his first appearance at the tournament since 1975, when he was an amateur. He shot an opening round 69 (−2) to take the solo lead. Colandro shot over-par in the second round but maintained the lead. In the final round, Colandro played better and expanded his lead to six strokes. However, he played poorly down the stretch, bogeying four of the last six holes, opening doors to "fast closing amateur Cary Sciorra." However, Colandro was able to hold on and defeat Sciorra by one. Roughly a week later, he began play at the Hancock-Lumber Maine Open. The event was held at Springbrook Country Club in Leeds, Maine. Colandro "got off slowly," bogeying the par-3 2nd hole. However, he shot three-under-par over the last 10 holes to score a 68 (−3) and take the solo lead. He led by one over Jim Hallet and Mark Carnevale. In the final round, Colandro was one-over-par through the first 15 holes, with one bogey and 14 pars. He fell into tie for the lead with clubhouse leader Charles Smith. However, Colandro birdied the 16th hole to take the solo lead. He parred in from there to win by one.

Colandro intended to leave for Australia on September 28 for "his sixth season on the Australian PGA Tour." In late October, he began play at the Australian PGA Championship at Castle Hill Country Club. On his front nine − played on the back nine − Colandro "was nowhere to be seen," shooting one-over-par. However, on his back nine he recorded six birdies in a row on the way to a 66 (−7). He tied Greg Norman's course record and took a one-stroke lead. "I'm pleased to be leading," he said after the round. "But what I think is even better is hitting six birdies in a row − that's really something." He led by one over Peter Jones and Peter Fowler. In the second round, however, "he struck trouble early." The morning dew caused "his glasses to fog up" and he could not see well for the first four holes. In addition, he had some contention with rules officials. He still managed to shoot a 72 and was only one back of the lead. In the third round he shot a 71 (−2) but fell to a tie for fifth, five back of leader Greg Norman. He closed with an even-par 73 and finished in a tie for 10th place. In early December he played the New Zealand Open. He opened with a 67 (−3) to put him near the lead. After three rounds he was still in the top ten. He ultimately finished in a tie for 13th place. Shortly thereafter, Colandro went on a "three-week skiing holiday to analyse and overhaul his game."

Colandro "took advantage" of this vacation, playing well in early 1987. In late January he began play at the Tasmanian Open. Despite "severe" winds, Colandro shot a first round 68 (−4) to put himself two back of Peter Fowler's lead. In the second round he recorded a "bold" finish, finishing with four consecutive birdies, to take the solo lead. With rounds of 68 and 67, it was considered "the best start" of his career. In the third round, Colandro had to negotiate "wild winds" which reached up to "60 kilometers per hour." He had a "horrendous start," opening with a double bogey and bogey. However, he "fought his way back into contention" but then "slumped" with a final hole bogey. He shot a 77 (+5) but maintained the lead, this time tied with Roger Mackay and Ian Baker-Finch. After the round he stated, "I've seen worse but it's not often that you shoot 77 and still have the lead." In the final round Colandro had a "patchy day" fell behind Baker-Finch on the front nine. However, Baker-Finch "blew it" with bogeys on the 14th and 15th holes leaving the championship up to Colandro and Brian Jones. Jones held a one-stroke lead over Colandro but was in trouble on the 15th hole. However, he negotiated a "treacherous" pitch to make par and maintain the lead. However, Colandro recorded a "beautiful birdie" on the par-3, 159-metre 17th hole to tie. On the par-4 final hole Colandro had a one-iron approach to the green. It "brushed over-hanging trees" and landed near the green. Colandro hit a "brave pitch" to within three-metres of the hole. He had a par putt to tie. However, it hit the "right edge of the cup" and lipped out. Colandro finished in solo second. Despite the disappointing finish, Colandro was optimistic. "I am happy with what I did," he said after the round. "I put myself in a position to win and did not choke today. It is my best finish in Australia."

Colandro did not have as much success for the remainder of the season, however. He made the cut in Australian Masters but did not record a high result, finishing solo 31st place. He following week he played Victorian Open. He was near the lead at the midway point of the tournament but shot a third round 80 to fall out of contention. The next week he played the Rich River Classic. Like the previous week he was near the lead in the middle of the tournament − in a tie for third after three rounds − but faded with a Sunday 74 (+2). Largely due to his high finish in Tasmania, however, he finished the beginning of the 1987 year ranked in ninth place on the PGA Tour of Australia's Order of Merit.

Shortly thereafter, Colandro returned to the United States. During this era, he lived in Newington, Connecticut. Colandro briefly worked as the head pro at Goodwin Park Golf Course, the course where he learned to play golf. However, he quickly decided it "wasn't for him." In early May, he played the Robert F. Noonan Pro-Am Golf Classic. It was his first American tournament of the year. The event was held at Oronoque Village Country Club in Stratford, Connecticut. Colandro opened the tournament poorly, shooting four-over-par for the first seven holes. However, he shot two-under-par for the remainder of the round to tie Doug Dalziel at the end of regulation. On the first playoff hole with Dalziel, Colandro holed a 70-foot chip shot for birdie to win the event. In August, he attempted to defend in his Connecticut Open championship. In the first round he shot an even-par 71 followed by a second round 72 (+1). During the final round, Colandro played the back nine first. He eagled the par-5 13th on the way to a 32 (−4). He had a two-shot lead at this point. However, he missed short par putts at the 1st, 2nd, and 4th holes to lose the lead. Though he shot one-under-par from there on in he finished one back. He finished the tournament at 212, one-under-par, one behind amateur Kevin Giancola. "I knew I had the tournament won if I hit good shots coming in, and I did that," he said after the round. "But I just got crazy with the putter." Despite the loss, Colandro earned the $4,000 first prize money as Giancola was an amateur. The following week he attempted to defend his Hancock Lumber Maine Open. The event was held at Riverside Municipal Golf Course in Portland, Maine. Colandro did not get off to a particularly hot start. His approach shot on the par-5 1st hole "was headed for the water" but then fortuitously "hit a tree and stopped." He "chipped close" for a birdie. He parred the next five holes. Colandro, however, then finished "the front nine with a flourish," birdieing the next three holes. Colandro continued to play flawlessly on the back nine, scoring five birdies against no bogeys, to take command. He was only one off the course record and held a three-shot lead. The second round was much more erratic. Colandro hit his approach into the water on the first hole leading to a double-bogey. He then bogeyed the next two holes. He made three consecutive birdies near the end of the front nine to get back in it. He ultimately shot a one-under-par 71 to hold a one-stroke lead over a number of players. "What a struggle today was!" he said after the round. In the final round Colandro birdied the first two holes "to put some distance between himself and the field right away." However, he bogeyed the 5th hole opening the doors once more. He eagled the par-5 13th, though, to create separation once again. He then birdied the 16th hole to assure the win. Colandro shot a 68 (−4) for a two-shot win over Jeff Lewis, a PGA Tour pro, and South Africa's Wilhelm Winsnes, a European Tour pro. "I'm really delighted because I played in some tough company and really stood up to it," he said after the event. His final total was 202 (−14). It was his lowest aggregate total in any tournament ever. In addition, it was a wire-to-wire win. He also successfully defended his victory from the previous year. "I'm very proud of my feat," he said. "It's the first professional title I've ever successfully defended."

As of October, Colandro returned to Australia. He had the chance to win several tournaments in the 1987–88 season. In early October he played the Queensland Open. He opened with bogey-free rounds of 68 (−4) and 69 (−3) to take a one-stroke lead over Mark Nash. In the third round, Colandro scored a birdie on the final hole to maintain the one-stroke lead, this time over David Graham. However, Colandro "staggered home" with a 77 (+5) in the final round. He finished in a tie for fourth, ten back of champion Graham. Later in the month he began play at the Australian PGA Championship. He opened with rounds of 70 (−3) and 72 (−1) to put him in 10th place. He shot a third round 74 but moved into solo 8th. In the final round, Colandro shot a 69 (−4), the day's best round, to take the clubhouse lead. However, leader Roger Mackay parred the last two holes to secure the win. Colandro finished solo second, one back. He earned A$18,360. It was the largest cheque of his career. Colandro was especially proud of the way he played under pressure. "I wasn't really in the position to win this time until the final run, but the way I finished gave me a lot of confidence."

During the first week of December, Colandro played the Air New Zealand Shell Open. The event was held at Titirangi Golf Course in Auckland, New Zealand. After two rounds, Colandro was at five-under-par 135, in a tie for third with Sandy Lyle and Rodger Davis and two other players, one back of leaders Vaughan Somers and Wayne Grady. In the third round he shot a 68 (−2) but fell into solo fourth place, three behind leader Lyle and one back of second place holders Grady and Davis. In the final round's first nine holes Colandro scored one birdie against no bogeys to get into contention. Colandro then birdied the 12th hole to briefly take the solo lead. However, all other serious contenders ultimately birdied the hole too. At this point, Colandro was tied for the lead with Lyle and Davis at ten-under-par. Grady and Somers were one shot back. However, "Colandro kept it going to the end, while the others faltered." Lyle in particular struggled, making three consecutive bogeys from the 13th to 15th holes "to drop out of the picture." Grady and Somers also shot three-over-par for the remainder of the tournament to finish well back. Only Davis remained as a serious challenger. Colandro, however, made "crucial pars" at the 14th and 16th holes to maintain the lead. Playing behind Colandro, Davis "couldn't match his rival on the 16th, three-putting for a bogey." Colandro, meanwhile, parred the 17th hole and the "tricky" 18th hole to take the clubhouse lead. Davis needed to birdie the final hole to tie. However, his approach missed the green and it "rolled back down a hill." He responded with a "brilliant chip" but it missed going in "by centimeters." Colandro won the event. With the victory, he won A$33,141, "by far his biggest" of his career. With his final round 67 (−3) he finished at 270 (−10), one ahead of Davis, three ahead of third-place finisher Lyle, and four ahead of Grady and Somers, who finished in a tie for fourth. Colandro dedicated the win to his father. At the presentation ceremony he said, "He was a pro who taught me to play golf and he is up there looking down now." He also stated later in the ceremony, "I think this win would mean more to me than any other player in the field. You look at all the other guys who were challenging and they are exempt to play just about anywhere in the world. I am not exempt to play anywhere." Colandro defeated some of the world's best golfers, in particular Lyle and Davis, who were ranked inside the world's top ten.

Largely due to his victory, Colandro reached the top spot of the PGA Tour of Australia's Order of Merit. He ultimately finished 1987 in 5th place on the Order of Merit. Colandro "also was in the title-chase for several other tournaments" later in the season. In February, Colandro played the Victorian Open. He was in solo 11th place, five back, at the midway point of the tournament. He then shot a two-under-par 70 in the third round to move into joint second, two behind leader Peter McWhinney. Colandro remained two back of the lead entering the final nine. However, a "disastrous" triple-bogey on the par-5 14th hole ended his chances. With a 76 (+4), he finished in a tie for fifth. The following week he played the Australian Masters. After three rounds he was near the lead, in a tie for 8th place. However, he played poorly in the final round and finished in 31st place. He had fallen to 8th place on the Order of Merit at this point. The following week he played the ESP Open at Royal Canberra Golf Club. Colandro opened with a 68 (−4) to put himself in a tie for 4th place. He "advanced strongly" in the second round, with a 69 (−3), to move closer to Greg Norman's lead. In the third round he was paired with Norman and Bernhard Langer. Norman was the top ranked golfer in the world while Langer was #3. Colandro was ranked #145. Colandro later described the experience to the Hartford Courant. "I played with Greg Norman and Bernhard Langer, and it was like being in the final group of a PGA Tour event," he said. "There were 10,000−12,000 people following us, and 50 people with every other group. I was a bit in awe and shot a 74, but it's the kind of thing you have to use as a positive experience." He came back with a final round 70 (−2) to finish in a tie for seventh. Shortly after the event, Colandro completed his eighth season in Australia. At this point, he was in 7th place on the Order of Merit. He had won over A$50,000 for the first half of the year. Colandro also played a few events on the Asia Golf Circuit after the Australian season concluded. He did not have a great experience in Asia, however. He missed the cut at the Singapore Open and Dunlop International Open. Despite opening well at the Indonesia Open, he finished in a tie for 41st. He also contracted a stomach virus while in Asia.

Shortly thereafter, Colandro returned to the United States. During this era, he lived in Newington, Connecticut. In the summer, Colandro hoped to receive sponsors exemption into PGA Tour events like the Kemper Open and Westchester Classic. He was hoping to receive a number of exemptions into PGA Tour tournaments after his win in New Zealand. However, he did not get into either the Kemper event or Westchester event or many other PGA Tour events. He later stated that he was "let down by my home country." Colandro also attempted to qualify for the 1988 U.S. Open. At sectional qualifying, he shot consecutive rounds of 75 to miss qualifying by several shots. However, Colandro earned entry into a number of European Tour events. In May, he earned a sponsor's exemption into the Italian Open. It was his first trip to the country of his ancestors. Colandro opened with a 68. However, he followed with a 76 to miss the cut. A month later, in June, Colandro received an exemption into the Monte Carlo Open. However, he missed the cut again. Shortly thereafter, Colandro attempted to qualify for the 1988 British Open. However, he failed at the qualifying rounds. In late July, however, he did manage to get into a PGA Tour event, his hometown event, the Canon-Sammy Davis Jr.-Greater Hartford Open. However, he shot consecutive rounds of 72 (+1) to miss the cut by four shots. Shortly after the summer ended, Colandro stated, "I've had a rough year but I'm looking forward to getting back into some form and some money."

During the first week of October, Colandro returned to Australia. He remained in the top ten of the PGA Tour of Australia's Order of Merit. However, his play did not significantly improve. His first tournament in Australia was the Queensland Open. He shot a first round 69 to open near the top ten. However, he shot a second round 75 to fall behind and faded from there. The following week he played the Tasmanian Open. Colandro opened with three consecutive over-par rounds but shot a 70 in the final round to finish in the top ten. The following week he played the New South Wales Open. After two rounds he was just outside of the top ten. However, he shot over-par on the weekend and did not seriously contend for the championship. In early December he played the Bicentennial Classic. At the star-studded field, he opened with a 67 (−5) to end the first round in a tie for second place with Jumbo Ozaki, one behind leader Fred Couples. However, in the second round Colandro triple-bogeyed the 8th hole to fall from contention. He ultimately finished in the bottom half of the field. The following week he played the Air New Zealand Shell Open in defense of his championship. However, he missed the cut. Despite the poor finish to the year, Colandro finished in 8th place on the PGA Tour of Australia's Order of Merit.

Colandro's poor play continued through 1989. Through the first two months of the year he did not record anything better than a tie for 21st in a stroke play event. In March, though, he began to have more success. Colandro recorded consecutive top-15 performances at the Nedlands Masters and Joondalup Classic. In May, he then recorded a top ten at the two-round South Australian PGA Championship. At the end of the first half of the 1989 season, Colandro was in 38th place on the PGA Tour of Australia's Order of Merit. He had earned roughly $22,000 so far. During this era, Colandro started doing "corporate outings" in Australia which were quite lucrative.

His high performance on Australia's Order of Merit from the previous year automatically qualified him for the Canadian Tour. Starting in June, Colandro intended to play in Canada for five straight weeks. In July, Colandro would attempt to qualify for the Greater Hartford Open and the 1989 Open Championship. He also intended to play in the Dutch Open, an event which he had already received a sponsor's exemption. He failed at getting into either the Hartford event or British Open. In late July, however, Colandro played the KLM Dutch Open. He shot a second round 67 to move into contention, near the top ten. However, he played poorly thereafter and finished in a tie for 40th. Later in the summer he was invited to play the Japan Open. After two rounds he was again near the top ten, in a tie for 15th place. However, like his experience in Holland, he fell back on the weekend and finished in a tie for 37th.

In October 1989, the Australian golf season started again. Due to his good play the previous few years he was considered one of the favorites at many events. Colandro played in the first event of the season, the Tasmanian Open. He was considered one of the favorites by the Canberra Times. He was the highest ranked player in the field. In the opening round he shot a 70 to put himself in a tie of 12th place, three back. He finished in a tie for 7th place. In early November he seriously contended for the New Zealand Open. He was one back of Frank Nobilo's lead entering the final round. However, he played very poorly on Sunday, ultimately finishing in a tie for 17th place. The following week he played the Australian PGA Championship. He was considered one of the favorites alongside Wayne Grady, Rodger Davis, David Graham, and Brett Ogle. He opened with a 70 to put him two shots back. However, he ended up in a tie for 54th place. The following week he played the New South Wales Open at The Lakes Golf Club. He was two back of the lead after two rounds. After the third round he was "still in contention at five under." In final round he had an "undulating" performance, scoring four birdies against four bogeys, but "a late charge" gave him solo third place. For the remainder of the 1989–90 season, however, Colandro did not have much success at regular events on the Australian tour. He did win two minor tournaments, however. In late December, Colandro played the two-round Jack Newton Celebrity Classic. The event was held at Twantin-Noosa Golf Club in Noosa Heads, Queensland. He shot an opening round 68 (−4) to put him two shots behind leader Jeff Woodland. Early in the second round, at the par-3 3rd hole, he "provided the best shot of the day," a 6-iron tee shot that went into the cup. It was only the second hole-in-one of his career. This helped him take the lead. However, he bogeyed the par-4 15th hole to fall into a tie with Woodland. He ultimately finished in a tie with Woodland to share the championship. Also, late in 1989–90 season he won the Western Australian PGA Championship.

In August 1990, Colandro played the Tunxis Invitational Pro-am at Chippanee Golf Club in Bristol, Connecticut. In the final round, Colandro was at five-under-par for the tournament after 15 holes. On the 16th hole he made a 20-foot birdie putt. He said later, "After the 16th hole, I thought I was two shots ahead. It was that putt that made me think I was going to win." However, playing ahead, competitor Don Robertson holed out an 8-iron from the rough on the 18th hole. With the eagle, he was now tied with Colandro. Colandro "almost avoided the playoff" but narrowly missed birdie putts on the 17th and 18th holes. The sudden-death playoff began on the first hole. Colandro hit his drive in the rough tree a grove of trees while his competitor hit his drive in the middle of the fairway. "With no way out," Colandro somehow "floated an 8-iron over a wall of pine trees and onto the green." Robertson, who missed the green, made bogey and Colandro two-putted for the win.

In late 1990, he returned to Australia. It was his "10th consecutive annual appearance on the Australian circuit." In October, he played the Queensland PGA Championship at Gainsborough Greens Golf Course in Brisbane, Australia. Colandro was even-par at the midway point of the tournament but then closed with rounds of 68 (−4) and 67 (−5) to finish solo second. He finished four behind the champion Terry Price. The remainder of the season would be far more up and down, however. Two weeks later he played the New South Wales Open. He was near the top ten after the second round and but failed to seriously contend on the weekend, finishing in tie for 17th place. He made the cut in three of his next four events but failed to place inside the top 25 in any of them. At the end of the year, at the Coolum Classic, he was in the top ten after two rounds but finished in a tie for 14th place. In early 1991 his play was similarly erratic. He missed the cut in two of his first three events though recorded a top-25 at the Sanctuary Cove Classic. In February, he played the Australian Match Play Championship at Kingston Heath Golf Club. In the first round he beat Peter Lonard but lost to Tod Power in the second round. Later in February he played the Tasmanian Open at Royal Hobart Golf Club. He took the lead with an opening round 65. However, he fell back significantly with rounds of 75 and 79. In the final round, though, he shot a 68 to finish in a tie for 8th. Two weeks later he played the New Zealand Open at Paraparaumu Beach Golf Course. In the first round he opened with a 68 to put him near the lead. However, he shot a 74 in the second round to fall into a tie for 14th. He closed well, however, with a third round 71 to move into a tie for 11th place and ultimately finished the tournament in the top ten. A few days later, Colandro played the Bridge pro-am, another event in New Zealand. Colandro shot rounds of 67 and 71 to win the event by one over Simon Owen and Ken Dukes. During this era, Colandro started seeing a sports psychologist in Melbourne, Australia "to help control his temper." Colandro finally felt he had his temper under control "giving credit to 15 minutes of daily meditation."

Shortly thereafter, Colandro returned to the United States. During this era, he lived in Canton, Massachusetts. During the final week of July he went on a winning streak. On July 24, Colandro began play at the two-round Tunxis Invitational Pro-Am, the event he won the previous year. He successfully defended his championship. A few days later, Colandro began play at the Greater Bangor Open. The event was three-rounds long and held at the Bangor Municipal Golf Course. At the par-69 course, Colandro shot even-par rounds the first two rounds to position himself in a tie for fourth place, three back of the lead. In the final round, the leaders struggled early while Colandro birdied four of the first 12 holes to take the lead. With his 67 (−2), he would go on to win it by two. The following Monday, he started play at the three-round Connecticut Open. The event was held at Brooklawn Country Club in Fairfield, Connecticut. Colandro opened two shots behind the lead. The second and third rounds were played over the course of one day, July 30. In the second round, Colandro recorded a bogey-free 68 (−3) to move two strokes in front. In the final round he continued with flawless play, failing to make a bogey during the first 15 holes. With a final round 71 (E), he ended up winning the tournament by seven shots.

=== Late career and rules controversies ===
As of late October 1991, Colandro had returned to Australia. During the 1991–92 season, he received most of his media attention for his performance at the Daikyo Palm Meadows Cup held in January. Colandro played excellently in the first round and "battled for the lead" before settling for joint third place, one back. He outplayed a number of star golfers in the first round, including Greg Norman, Chip Beck, and Isao Aoki. In the second round he shot an even-par 72 to remain near the lead, two back of leader Roger Mackay, in joint fourth place. By the 7th hole of the third round, he was in the lead. Two holes later, on the 9th green, Colandro missed a birdie putt. Frustrated about the missed putt, Colandro "bent his putter in anger" and then tapped in. Colandro "immediately told a PGA official, asking him if he would be allowed to continue." However, the rules official, Trevor Herden, told him that he was disqualified. Colandro's playing partner, Craig Parry, stated afterwards, "He had a rush of blood and tapped the ball into the hole. It happened so quickly I didn't have time to call out a warning." The disqualification was considered "stunning." Colandro immediately "rushed off the course" while "refusing requests by officials to speak to media."

For the remainder of the 1991–92 season, other than a top 5 at the Pyramid Australian Masters, Colandro did not produce many highlights at significant Australian events. However, Colandro also had much success a pro-ams late in the season. In March, he began play in the Toshiba-Prime series, a notable pro-am circuit in Australia. He was considered one of the top draws along with Kel Nagle. In April, he played the L.J. Hooker Pro-am golf event. He finished in joint third place at 144 (−2), four behind champion Brad Andrews. In 1992, he also won the Postsea pro-am, sharing the title with Australia's Bradley Hughes and England's Ben Jackson.

He soon returned to North America. In late May, he began play at the Payless Open on the Canadian Tour. It was a four-round event at Royal Colwood Golf Club in Victoria, British Columbia. In the pro-am's second round he a 65, the best round among professionals that day. Soon thereafter, Colandro played the tournament proper. After three rounds, he was in 12th place, five shots behind leader Pat Bates. In the final round, Colandro shot a 65 (−5) to tie Bates and Canada's Mike Pero for the lead at the end of regulation. They played a sudden-death playoff to determine the champion. Pero bogeyed the second playoff hole to eliminate himself. On the fifth playoff hole, Bates hit his drive out of bounds which led to double-bogey. Colando won it with a par. It was his first victory in a four-round tournament since 1988. Roughly a month later he began play the Canadian PGA Championship. He finished in a tie for fourth place. Near the end of the season, after eight events, Colandro was in sixth place on the Canadian Order of Merit. He had earned roughly $28,000 so far.

As of October 1992, Colandro had returned to Australia. In November, he played the Australian PGA Championship. The event was held at Concord Golf Course in Sydney. Aided by "perfect scoring conditions," Colandro was seven-under-par over the first 16 holes. He was on track to equal or break Concord's course record of 64. However, Colandro "collapsed spectacularly with a bogey and a triple bogey on the last two holes." Despite this setback, after three rounds Colandro was still in contention, in a tie for third. However, he played poorly during the final day and ultimately finished in a tie for 14th. In late April, Colandro began play at the three-round South Australian PGA Championship. Colandro finished at 204, in solo second place, two behind champion Mark Officer.

In June 1993, attempted to defend his Payless Open championship in Canada. However, he missed the cut. Later in the month, he played the 1993 U.S. Open. The event was at Baltusrol Golf Club in Springfield, New Jersey. Although the course was playing relatively easy, Colandro shot an opening round 78 (+8). Colandro had five three-putts. However, he played much better in the second round, shooting a 67 (−3), though he missed the cut by a shot. Despite missing the cut, Colandro was proud of his performance. "I felt after shooting the 67 that I belonged with the best of them," he said.

In November 1993, Colandro returned to Australia. It was his 12th straight season on the PGA Tour of Australasia. Early in the season, he again seriously speculated about moving permanently to Australia. "I'm a bloody Aussie now," he said. "I might as well live here." Early in the season he recorded a few top-25s but was never close to contending. In mid-December he played the Coolum Classic. He received much media attention at this event. Colandro opened with a 67 (−5) to tie for the lead. The rest of the tournament, however, was far more unsteady. In the second round, on the 10th hole, Colandro missed a putt. In frustration, he banged his putter against a sprinkler head and cart path modifying the putter's shape. In addition, he had "a run-in with a cameraman at the 14th hole." He subsequently bogeyed three of the last five holes. He still managed to shoot a 71 (−1). He was in a tie for fifth place, now three back of the lead. In the third round he shot an even-par 72 to remain in contention, two behind the leaders. However, he was informed after the round that he was disqualified. Early on Saturday, before the third round, Colandro's caddie, Gerry Meares, spoke to tour operations manager Trevor Herden. He spoke about Colandro slamming his putter into the sprinkler head on Saturday which modified the shape of the putter. Colandro was specifically accused of "changing the (lie) shape of his putter." According to Herden, playing with a "bent putter" was against the rules. "Mike Colandro is accordingly disqualified from the tournament," Herden stated. Herden told the media, "For the last six holes he had to putt on the toe of his putter. He told his caddie he had flattened it. He admitted that he had flattened it but he didn't think it was enough to warrant any penalty." Colandro protested the decision. "It looks as though someone is out to get me," he said. But actually it really was that Colandro never learnt his lesson from the first time. Colandro specifically breached rule 4–2, "Playing Characteristics Changed." The situation was remarkable similar to his disqualification from the Daikyo Palm Meadows Cup the previous year. In each example, Colandro violated the exact same rule, was near the lead in the tournament, and was disqualified by the same rules official, Herden.

On January 6 it was announced that an "independent committee" would hold a "tribunal" about the matter to debate "possible disciplinary action" against Colandro. The last time the PGA Tour of Australasia held an independent hearing was the previous year over Colandro's rule violation at the Daikyo Palm Meadows Cup event. The hearing was held on January 17 at Kingston Heath Golf Club. The hearing specifically concerned Colandro potentially "breaching the players' code of conduct." Colandro's caddy, Gerry Meares, stated that Colandro "knew the putter was altered and asked him not to say anything." It was a "marathon" session lasting more than five hours. At the end of the hearing, chairman of the committee, Grant Hattam, a partner with Corrs, Chambers, and Westgarth, stated that Colandro was "cleared" of misconduct. The Canberra Times reported that "there was not enough evidence to convict Colandro." "Mr. Colandro has received the benefit of the doubt," Hattam said after the event. Colandro also spoke after the decision. "It hasn't been easy to live with and it was a tough time over Christmas," he said. "I feel good at being cleared and I have emerged out of this with my reputation intact. I bear no grudges against anybody."

As of 1994, Colandro had returned to live in Newington, Connecticut. In late 1994, Colandro returned to Australia. For most of the 1994–95 season, he did not record many high results. At the end of the season, at the Canon Challenge, he briefly received attention for his play, positioning himself in 6th place at the end of the first round. However, he faded over the remainder of the tournament and finished T-38.

Colandro did not play on the PGA Tour of Australasia after 1995. He played on the tour for 16 years. He still occasionally played in local New England events. However, around the year 2000, he retired as a touring professional. Colandro still worked in the golf industry, however. He worked as a swing instructor, created a golf-related DVD-CD video, and conducted a number of golf shows. In 2005, he helped start a charity golf event, the Gulf Relief Rock n' Roll Event. The purpose of the event was to raise money for victims of Hurricane Katrina. The event was held at Gillette Ridge Golf Club in Bloomfield, New Jersey. During this era, he also was working on an autobiography. It was self-published in 2012 with the title Almost an Aussie. Colandro promoted this book at several libraries across Connecticut and Florida.

According to the Hartford Courant, Colandro won more than 50 professional tournaments across the world. Many local pros stated he was one of the best golfers ever from the area. Local club professional Jim Becker stated, "He was the best chipper and bunker player I've ever seen." Goodwin Park Golf Course club professional Jim Goshdigian said that Colandro "accomplished more worldwide than any other player in Goodwin Park GC history." During his career, he held the course records at several Australian golf courses and at Bairnsdale Golf Course and Indian Hills Golf Course in Connecticut.

== Personal life ==
In 1988, Colandro was engaged to Evelyn Fitzpatrick of Boston, Massachusetts. He intended to get married on September 16, 1989. In 1993, he got divorced.

Colandro was known for his "colorful" personality. For his golfing attire, he wore old-fashioned knickers and plus fours. He emulated Payne Stewart who also wore the outfit.

== Death ==
By 2013, Colandro had serious health issues. He told the Hartford Courant, "I'm legally blind, on dialysis three times a week and have neuropathy in my feet." In the fall of 2014, he moved to Pompano Beach, Florida with his brother Albert. His mother had a home in Pompano Beach. On August 9, 2015, Colandro died. Colandro's brother stated that he "likely had a heart attack." His funeral was held on August 22 at St. Henry's Catholic Church in Pompano Beach.

In 2020, Jim Becker won the Connecticut Senior Open. He dedicated the win to his "longtime friend" Colandro.

== Amateur wins ==
- 1970 Hartford District Amateur
- 1975 Hartford District Amateur

== Professional wins (11) ==
=== PGA Tour of Australia wins (1) ===
No.	Date	Tournament	Winning score	Margin of victory	Runner-up
1	Dec 6, 1987 (1988 season)	Air New Zealand Shell Open	−10 (70-65-68-67=270)	1 stroke	(Australia) Rodger Davis

=== Canadian Tour wins (1) ===
No.	Date	Tournament	Winning score	Margin of victory	Runners-up
1	May 31, 1992	Payless Open	−7 (68-71-69-65=273)	Playoff	(United States) Pat Bates, (Canada) Mike Pero

=== Other wins (9) ===
- 1975 Victor Riccio Tournament
- 1985 Ansett Yarra Yarra Easter Classic
- 1986 Connecticut Open, Hancock-Lumber Maine Open
- 1987 Hancock-Lumber Maine Open
- 1989 Jack Newton Celebrity Classic (tie with Jeff Woodland)
- 1990 Western Australia PGA Championship
- 1991 Connecticut Open, Greater Bangor Open

== Results in major championships ==
Tournament	1984	1985	1986	1987	1988	1989	1990	1991	1992	1993
U.S. Open			CUT							CUT
The Open Championship	CUT									

Note: Colandro did not play in the Masters Tournament or the PGA Championship.
CUT = missed the half-way cut

== See also ==
- Spring 1979 PGA Tour Qualifying School graduates
