= Brett Ogle =

Australian professional golfer (born 1964)

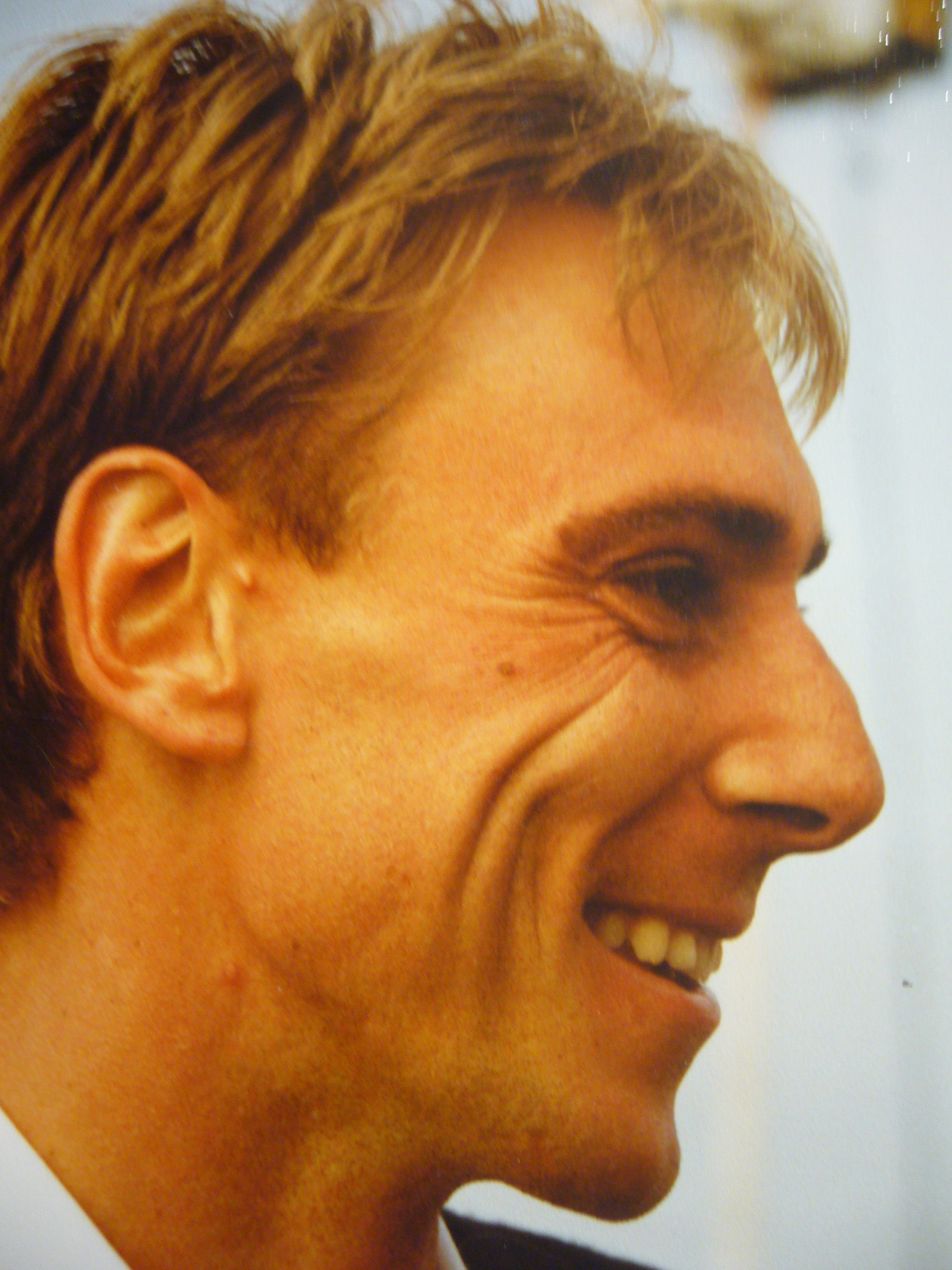

Personal information
- Full name: Brett James Ogle
- Nationality: Australia
- Born: 14 July 1964 (age 62) Paddington, New South Wales, Australia
- Height: 1.88 m (6 ft 2 in)
- Weight: 83 kg (183 lb; 13.1 st)
- Spouse: Ricki (married 2006)
- Children: Chris, Rachel

Career
- Sport: Golf
- Turned professional: 1985
- Former tours: PGA Tour; European Tour; PGA Tour of Australasia
- Professional wins: 14
- Highest ranking: 44 (7 February 1993)

Number of wins by tour
- PGA Tour: 2
- European Tour: 1
- PGA Tour of Australasia: 5
- Other: 6

Best results in major championships
- Masters Tournament: T50: 1993
- PGA Championship: CUT: 1994, 1995, 1996
- U.S. Open: T21: 1995
- The Open Championship: T11: 1995

Achievements and awards
- Australasian Rookie of the Yyear: 1986

Brett James Ogle (born 14 July 1964) is an Australian professional golfer.

== Early life and amateur career ==
Ogle was born in Paddington, New South Wales. He was adopted at six weeks of age and was brought up in the town of Goulburn.

He took up the game in his early teens and reduced his golfing handicap from 32 to 1 in just two years. He was the Senior and Junior Club Champion at his home club in Goulburn, Tully Park. His first breakthrough win was at the Senior and Junior Club Champion of Champions event at the Federal Golf Club in 1980, a tournament that pitted all of the NSW Club Champions together. Ogle then won the New South Wales Junior in 1984 and 1985. Later in 1985, he won the New South Wales Amateur

== Professional career ==
In 1985, he turned pro. In 1986, Ogle had his breakthrough win on the South Pacific Tour by winning the Fijian Hotel Pro-am. He also won the Pacific Budget Rent a Car Open held at Pacific Harbour Golf Course.

After a stint on the Asia Golf Circuit and Japan Golf Tour, Ogle headed to the European Qualifying tournament in Spain at the end of 1987 where he was successful in gaining a full-time playing card for that Tour. In 1988, Ogle won his first big event on the PGA Tour of Australasia winning the Tasmanian Open. Later that year he finished third behind Rodger Davis and Fred Couples at the Bicentennial Classic. In 1989, Ogle broke through on the European Tour winning the Equity & Law Challenge, an unofficial event, and then in 1990 claimed the AGF Open, an official event, in France. That year he had his best finish on the Order of Merit, 24th place. He also ended the 1989 and 1992 seasons inside the top 30.

At the end of 1992, Ogle tied for medalist honors at the PGA Tour Qualifying Tournament. He won his first PGA Tour title in just his fourth event of 1993, the AT&T Pebble Beach National Pro-Am. He won one other tournament on the tour, the Hawaiian Open in 1994. He was unable to maintain that form as he struggled with the yips, and lost his card at the end of the 1996 season.

Since retiring from Tournament golf in 2002, Ogle was lead analyst and commentator for Fox Sports until retiring from the organization in 2016. Ogle is also the brand Ambassador for Australia's biggest golf retailer Drummond Golf.

Ogle joined Fox Sports following his retirement from playing becoming the host of The Golf Show and PGA Tour with Brett Ogle.

== Professional wins (14) ==
=== PGA Tour wins (2) ===
No.	Date	Tournament	Winning score	Margin of victory	Runner-up
1	7 Feb 1993	AT&T Pebble Beach National Pro-Am	−12 (68-68-69-71=276)	3 strokes	(United States) Billy Ray Brown
2	16 Jan 1994	United Airlines Hawaiian Open	−17 (66-66-69-68=269)	1 stroke	(United States) Davis Love III

=== European Tour wins (1) ===
No.	Date	Tournament	Winning score	Margin of victory	Runners-up
1	1 Apr 1990	AGF Open	−10 (72-66-70-70=278)	3 strokes	(England) Paul Curry, (Scotland) Bill Longmuir

=== PGA Tour of Australasia wins (5) ===
No.	Date	Tournament	Winning score	Margin of victory	Runner(s)-up
1	16 Oct 1988	Tasmanian Open	−4 (74-71-72-67=284)	1 stroke	(Australia) Brett Johns (a)
2	17 Dec 1989	Mirage Queensland Open	−14 (66-68-71-73=278)	3 strokes	(Australia) John Clifford
3	25 Nov 1990	Australian PGA Championship (Note: incorporating the New South Wales PGA Championship.)	−11 (65-70-69-69=273)	5 strokes	(Australia) Rodger Davis, (Australia) Wayne Grady
4	17 Nov 1991	West End South Australian Open	−13 (71-70-69-69=279)	2 strokes	(Australia) Mike Harwood
5	15 Nov 1992	Eagle Blue Open (2)	−12 (72-70-69-69=280)	1 stroke	(Australia) Craig Warren

PGA Tour of Australasia playoff record (0–1)

No.	Year	Tournament	Opponents	Result
1	1988	Drinnan Motors Queensland Open	(Australia) John Clifford, (Australia) Brett Officer	Officer won with birdie on first extra hole

=== Other wins (6) ===
- 1985 Air Pacific Budget Open (Fiji)
- 1986 Tahiti Open, Fijian Hotel Pro-am
- 1989 Equity & Law Challenge
- 1992 World Cup (individual)
- 1996 West Coast Classic (Canada)

== Results in major championships ==
Tournament	1989	1990	1991	1992	1993	1994	1995	1996
Masters Tournament					T50	CUT		
U.S. Open							T21	T32
The Open Championship	T52	CUT	T73				T11	T67
PGA Championship					CUT	CUT	CUT	

Did not play

CUT = missed the half-way cut
"T" = tied

== Results in The Players Championship ==
Tournament	1993	1994	1995	1996
The Players Championship	T61	CUT	CUT	CUT

CUT = missed the halfway cut
"T" indicates a tie for a place

== Team appearances ==
Amateur

- Nomura Cup (representing Australia): 1985 (winners)
- Australian Men's Interstate Teams Matches (representing New South Wales): 1984, 1985 (winners)

Professional

- World Cup (representing Australia): 1992 (individual winner), 1995

== See also ==
- 1992 PGA Tour Qualifying School graduates
