= Coca-Cola Classic (golf) =

Golf tournament

Tournament information
- Location: Melbourne, Australia
- Established: 1989
- Course: Royal Melbourne Golf Club
- Par: 72
- Tour: PGA Tour of Australasia
- Format: Stroke play
- Month played: January
- Final year: 1990

Tournament record score
- Aggregate: 278 Ronan Rafferty (1990)
- To par: −10 as above

Final champion
- (Northern Ireland) Ronan Rafferty
- Location in Australia Location in Victoria

The Coca-Cola Classic was a golf tournament held in Australia in 1989 and 1990 at the Royal Melbourne Golf Club, Melbourne. Prize money was A$600,000 in 1989 and A$700,000 in 1990.

== Winners ==
Year	Winner	Score	To par	Margin of victory	Runner(s)-up	Winner's share (A$)	Ref.
1990	(Northern Ireland) Ronan Rafferty	278	−10	2 strokes	(United States) Brian Watts	126,000	
1989	(Japan) Isao Aoki	279	−9	1 stroke	(Australia) Rodger Davis (Australia) Peter Fowler (Japan) Tsuneyuki Nakajima (Australia) Peter O'Malley	108,000	
