= 1992 PGA Tour of Australasia =

Golf tour season

1992 PGA Tour of Australasia season
- Duration: 9 January 1992 – 13 December 1992
- Number of official events: 15 (Note: A further two tournaments were scheduled but were either cancelled or removed from the schedule.)
- Most wins: (Australia) Robert Allenby (2) (Australia) Rodger Davis (2) (Australia) Craig Parry (2)
- Order of Merit: (Australia) Robert Allenby
- Player of the Year: (Australia) Robert Allenby
- Rookie of the Year: (Australia) Robert Allenby

The 1992 PGA Tour of Australasia was the 21st season on the PGA Tour of Australasia, the main professional golf tour in Australia and New Zealand since it was formed in 1973.

== Schedule ==
The following table lists official events during the 1992 season.

| Date | Tournament | Location | Purse (A$) | Winner (Note: The number in brackets after each winner's name is the number of PGA Tour of Australasia events they had won up to and including that tournament. This information is only shown for PGA Tour of Australasia members.) | OWGR points | Notes |
|---|---|---|---|---|---|---|
| 12 Jan | SxL Sanctuary Cove Classic | Queensland | 700,000 | (Australia) Rodger Davis (13) | 28 | |
| 19 Jan | Daikyo Palm Meadows Cup | Queensland | 1,400,000 | (Northern Ireland) Ronan Rafferty (5) | 38 | |
| 26 Jan | Vines Classic | Western Australia | 800,000 | (Australia) Ian Baker-Finch (9) | 24 | |
| ~~2 Feb~~ | Club Cape Schanck Cup | Victoria | – | Cancelled | – | New tournament |
| 9 Feb | Mercedes-Benz Australian Match Play Championship | Victoria | 200,000 | (Australia) Mike Clayton (4) | 16 | |
| ~~23 Feb~~ | Australian Tournament Players Championship | Victoria | – | Removed | – | |
| 23 Feb | AMP New Zealand Open | New Zealand | NZ$250,000 | (New Zealand) Grant Waite (1) | 18 | |
| 1 Mar | CIG New South Wales Open | New South Wales | 150,000 | (Australia) Craig Parry (2) | 16 | |
| 18 Oct | Perak Masters | Malaysia | 200,000 | (Australia) Robert Allenby (1) | 16 | |
| 25 Oct | Dunhill Malaysian Masters | Malaysia | 430,000 | (Australia) Terry Price (1) | 16 | |
| 1 Nov | Pioneer Singapore PGA Championship | Singapore | 150,000 | (Australia) Terry Gale (16) | 12 | |
| 8 Nov | Air New Zealand Shell Open | New Zealand | NZ$300,000 | (Zimbabwe) Nick Price (n/a) | 18 | |
| 15 Nov | Eagle Blue Open | South Australia | 150,000 | (Australia) Brett Ogle (5) | 16 | |
| 22 Nov | Ford Australian PGA Championship | New South Wales | 300,000 | (Australia) Craig Parry (3) | 20 | |
| 29 Nov | Australian Open | New South Wales | 800,000 | (Australia) Steve Elkington (1) | 36 | Flagship event |
| 6 Dec | Johnnie Walker Australian Classic | Victoria | 700,000 | (Australia) Robert Allenby (2) | 28 | |
| 13 Dec | Coolum Classic | Queensland | 200,000 | (Australia) Rodger Davis (14) | 16 | |

=== Unofficial events ===
The following events were sanctioned by the PGA Tour of Australasia, but did not carry official money, nor were wins official.

| Date | Tournament | Location | Purse (A$) | Winner | OWGR points | Notes |
|---|---|---|---|---|---|---|
| 16 Feb | Pyramid Australian Masters | Victoria | 700,000 | (Australia) Craig Parry | 36 | |
| 1 Nov | Victorian Open | Victoria | 155,000 | (Australia) Ian Stanley | n/a | |

== Order of Merit ==
The Order of Merit was based on prize money won during the season, calculated in Australian dollars.

| Position | Player | Prize money (A$) |
|---|---|---|
| 1 | (Australia) Robert Allenby | 309,063 |
| 2 | (Australia) Rodger Davis | 276,529 |
| 3 | (Australia) Craig Parry | 230,839 |
| 4 | (Australia) Bradley Hughes | 196,526 |
| 5 | (Australia) Ian Baker-Finch | 174,132 |

== Awards ==
| Award | Winner | Ref. |
|---|---|---|
| Player of the Year | (Australia) Robert Allenby | |
| Rookie of the Year | (Australia) Robert Allenby | |
