= Wayne Riley =

Australian professional golfer

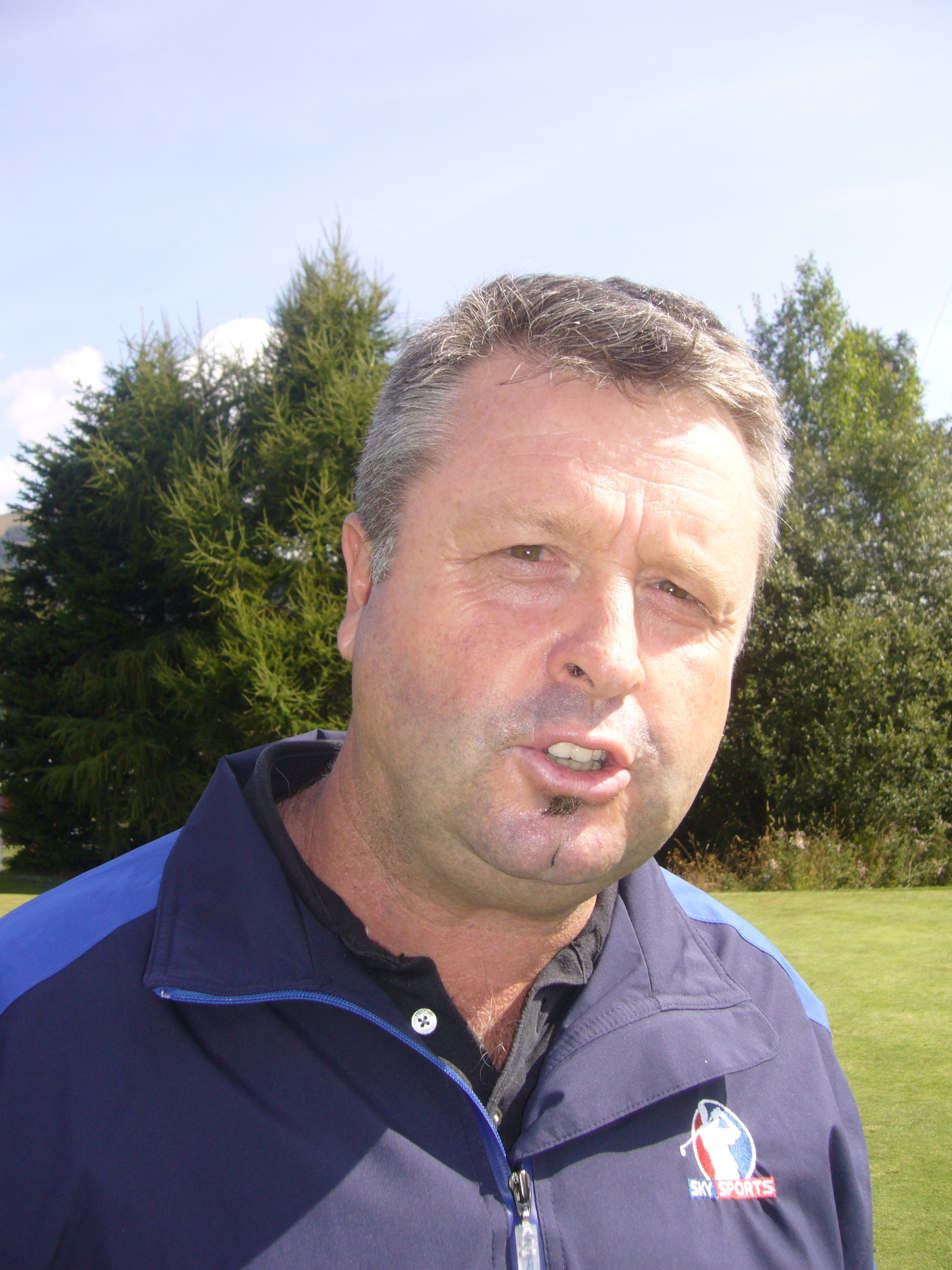

Personal information
- Nickname: Radar
- Nationality: Australia
- Born: 17 September 1962 (age 64) Sydney, Australia
- Height: 1.78 m (5 ft 10 in)
- Children: 4

Career
- Sport: Golf
- Turned professional: 1977
- Former tours: European Tour; PGA Tour of Australasia
- Professional wins: 6
- Highest ranking: 62 (7 July 1996)

Number of wins by tour
- European Tour: 2
- PGA Tour of Australasia: 4

Best results in major championships
- Masters Tournament: DNP
- PGA Championship: DNP
- U.S. Open: T40: 1996
- The Open Championship: T33: 1985

Wayne Riley (born 17 September 1962) is an Australian professional golfer.

== Career ==
Riley was born in Sydney. He turned professional in 1977, and started out on the PGA Tour of Australasia. He has won several tournaments in Australia and New Zealand, including the 1991 Australian Open.

Riley came through the European Tour's final qualifying school in 1984, but had to wait eleven years before winning his first tournament on the tour, the 1995 Scottish Open. He played on the European Tour for almost twenty years, and won only one other tour event, the 1996 Portuguese Open. He finished a career high 11th on the Order of Merit in 1995.

Riley represented Australia in the 1996 Alfred Dunhill Cup and the 1997 World Cup.

Since leaving the tour, Riley has worked for Sky Sports as an on course commentator on their European Tour coverage.

Riley has four children who all reside in England.

== Professional wins (6) ==
=== European Tour wins (2) ===
No.	Date	Tournament	Winning score	Margin of victory	Runner(s)-up
1	15 Jul 1995	Scottish Open	−12 (66-69-69-72=276)	2 strokes	(England) Nick Faldo
2	24 Mar 1996	Portuguese Open	−13 (65-67-69-70=271)	2 strokes	(England) Mark Davis, (England) Martin Gates

=== PGA Tour of Australasia wins (4) ===
No.	Date	Tournament	Winning score	Margin of victory	Runner-up
1	11 Nov 1984	Victorian PGA Championship	−14 (68-65-70-71=274)	Playoff	(Australia) Ian Baker-Finch
2	24 Nov 1985	U-Bix Classic (Note: incorporating the New South Wales PGA Championship)	−19 (70-68-70-65=273)	3 strokes	(Australia) George Serhan
3	11 Nov 1990	Air New Zealand Shell Open	−12 (67-65-66-70=268)	7 strokes	(New Zealand) Frank Nobilo
4	1 Dec 1991	Australian Open	−3 (72-74-71-68=285)	1 stroke	(Australia) Robert Allenby (a)

PGA Tour of Australasia playoff record (1–0)

No.	Year	Tournament	Opponent	Result
1	1984	Victorian PGA Championship	(Australia) Ian Baker-Finch	Won with birdie on second extra hole

== Results in major championships ==
Tournament	1984	1985	1986	1987	1988	1989	1990	1991	1992	1993	1994	1995	1996	1997	1998	1999	2000	2001
U.S. Open													T40					
The Open Championship	CUT	T33			T34	CUT			T59		T72	T88	CUT	T51				CUT

Note: Riley never played in the Masters Tournament or the PGA Championship.

Did not play

CUT = missed the half-way cut (3rd round cut in 1984 Open Championship)
"T" = tied

== Team appearances ==
- Dunhill Cup (representing Australia): 1996
- World Cup (representing Australia): 1997
