= Bob Hope British Classic =

Tournament information
- Location: Hertfordshire, England
- Established: 1980
- Course: Royal Liverpool Golf Club
- Par: 72
- Tour: European Tour
- Format: Stroke play
- Prize fund: £250,000
- Month played: August
- Final year: 1991

Tournament record score
- Aggregate: 269 José María Cañizares (1980); 269 José María Cañizares (1983)
- To par: −19 as above

Final champion
- (England) Paul Broadhurst
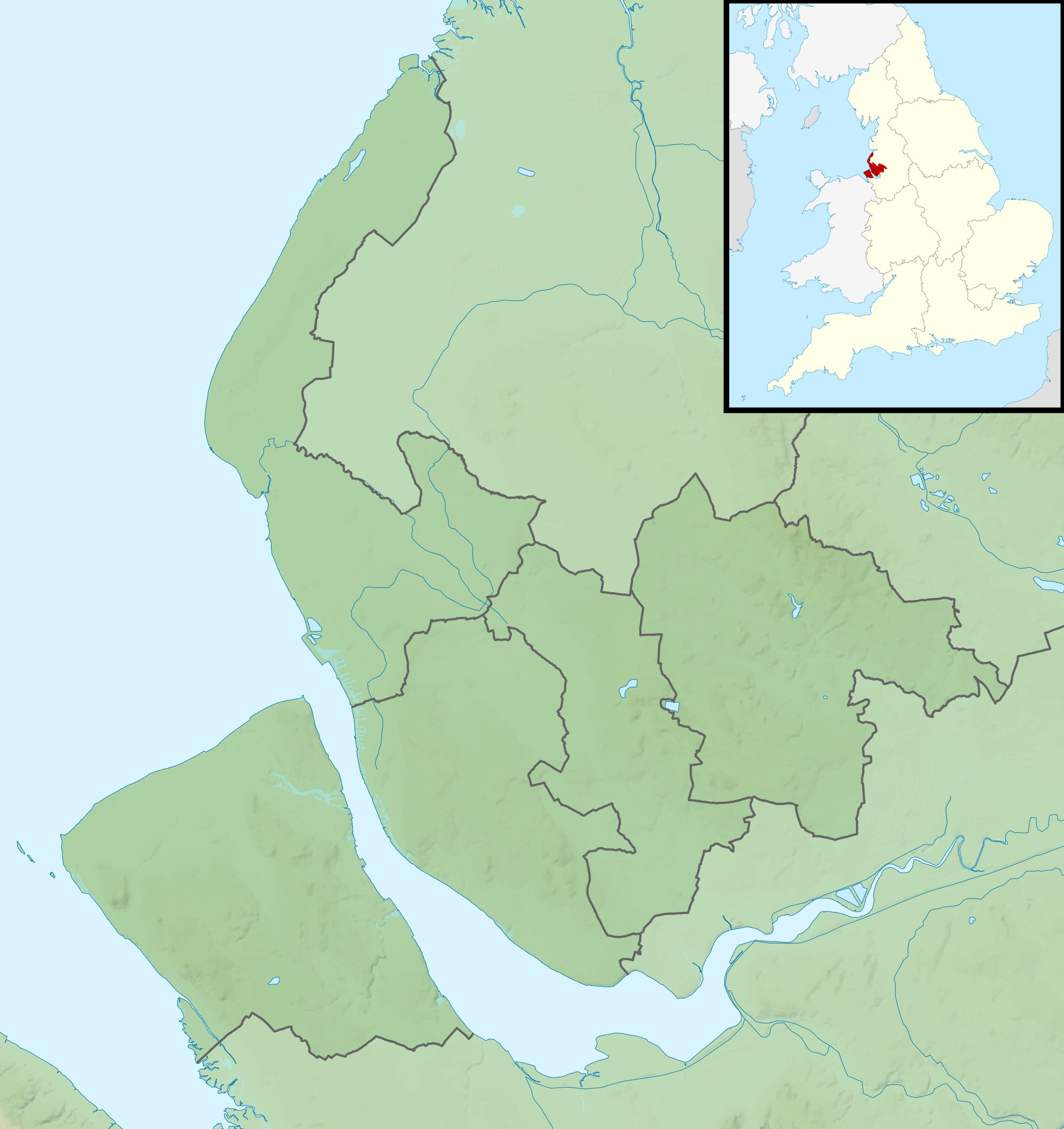
- Location in England Location in Merseyside

The Bob Hope British Classic was the original and most often used name of a European Tour golf tournament which was played in England every year but one from 1980 to 1991. It had six different names in total. The English born American entertainer Bob Hope was one of the most prominent celebrity friends of golf, and is a member of the World Golf Hall of Fame. All of the tournaments except the first and the last were played at Moor Park Golf Club in Hertfordshire, just to the north of London. The best known winner was the German future World Number 1 Bernhard Langer. In 1991 the prize fund was £252,370, which was below average for a European Tour event at that time.

== Winners ==
Year	Winner	Score	To par	Margin of victory	Runner(s)-up	Venue	Ref.
European Pro-Celebrity
1991	(England) Paul Broadhurst	272	−16	7 strokes	(Northern Ireland) Ronan Rafferty	Royal Liverpool	
Wang Four Stars
1990	(Australia) Rodger Davis (2)	271	−17	Playoff	(Australia) Mike Clayton (United States) Bill Malley (Zimbabwe) Mark McNulty	Moor Park	
1989	(Australia) Craig Parry	273	−15	Playoff	(Wales) Ian Woosnam	Moor Park	
Wang Four Stars National Pro-Celebrity
1988	(Australia) Rodger Davis	275	−1	1 stroke	(Spain) José María Cañizares (Republic of Ireland) Eamonn Darcy	Moor Park	
London Standard Four Stars National Pro-Celebrity
1987	(Zimbabwe) Mark McNulty	273	−15	Playoff	(Scotland) Sam Torrance	Moor Park	
1986	(Spain) Antonio Garrido	275	−13	1 stroke	(Spain) José María Olazábal (Northern Ireland) Ronan Rafferty	Moor Park	
Four Stars National Pro-Celebrity
1985	(Scotland) Ken Brown	277	−3	1 stroke	(Scotland) Gordon Brand Jnr	Moor Park	
Bob Hope British Classic
1984	Cancelled due to lack of sponsorship						
1983	(Spain) José María Cañizares (2)	269	−19	1 stroke	(Northern Ireland) David Feherty	Moor Park	
1982	(Scotland) Gordon Brand Jnr	272	−16	3 strokes	(England) Mark James	Moor Park	
1981	(West Germany) Bernhard Langer	200 (Note: Shortened to 54 holes due to rain.)	−13	5 strokes	(England) Peter Oosterhuis	Moor Park	
1980	(Spain) José María Cañizares	269	−19	1 stroke	(Spain) Seve Ballesteros (United States) Lee Trevino (England) Brian Waites	R.A.C.	
