= Air New Zealand Shell Open =

Tournament information
- Location: Auckland, New Zealand
- Established: 1975
- Course: The Grange Golf Club
- Par: 70
- Tours: PGA Tour of Australasia; New Zealand Golf Circuit
- Format: Stroke play
- Prize fund: NZ$300,000
- Month played: December
- Final year: 1994

Tournament record score
- Aggregate: 264 D. A. Weibring (1985)
- To par: −21 Bob Shearer (1976)

Final champion
- (Australia) Shane Robinson
- Location in New Zealand

The Air New Zealand Shell Open was a golf tournament held in New Zealand between 1975 and 1994. The event was the New Zealand Airlines Classic in 1975 and 1976 and the New Zealand Airlines Open in 1977. The Grange hosted the first and final editions of the event but Titirangi hosted the event the most, 14 times between 1977 and 1991. The only other courses to host the event were Russley (1976) and Wellington (1979).

== History ==
In 1975, the event was formed and hosted by Air New Zealand. In 1977, the event became part of the PGA Tour of Australia's Order of Merit. The following year Shell also became a title sponsor.

The 1979 event coincided with the Mount Erebus disaster. On November 28, the day before the tournament began, Air New Zealand Flight 901 crashed into Mount Erebus in Antarctica. There was much discussion about cancelling the tournament. However, Morrie Davis (CEO of Air New Zealand) decided that the tournament would go on. Australian David Graham won the event.

== Winners ==
Year	Tour (Note: ANZ − PGA Tour of Australasia; NZGC − New Zealand Golf Circuit.)	Winner	Score	To par	Margin of victory	Runner(s)-up	Venue	Ref.
Air New Zealand Shell Open
1994	ANZ	(Australia) Shane Robinson	274	−6	1 stroke	(Australia) David McKenzie	The Grange	
1993	ANZ	(Australia) Terry Price	277	−3	1 stroke	(New Zealand) Michael Campbell (United States) Brad Faxon (Australia) Wayne Riley	The Grange	
1992	ANZ	(Zimbabwe) Nick Price	271	−9	Playoff	(Australia) Lucas Parsons	The Grange	
1991	ANZ	(United States) John Morse	273	−7	3 strokes	(Sri Lanka) Nandasena Perera	Titirangi	
1990	ANZ	(Australia) Wayne Riley	268	−12	7 strokes	(New Zealand) Frank Nobilo	Titirangi	
1989	ANZ	(United States) Don Bies	275	−5	4 strokes	(Australia) Brad Andrews (Australia) Glenn Joyner	Titirangi	
1988	ANZ	(Australia) Terry Gale (2)	271	−9	4 strokes	(United States) Hale Irwin (Australia) Ossie Moore (Australia) Jeff Woodland	Titirangi	
1987	ANZ	(United States) Mike Colandro	270	−10	1 stroke	(Australia) Rodger Davis	Titirangi	
1986	ANZ	(Australia) Rodger Davis	267	−13	3 strokes	(Australia) Bob Shearer (United States) Curtis Strange	Titirangi	
1985	ANZ	(United States) D. A. Weibring	264	−16	1 stroke	(Australia) Rodger Davis	Titirangi	
1984	ANZ	(Australia) Brian Jones	266	−14	2 strokes	(Australia) Wayne Grady	Titirangi	
1983	ANZ	(Australia) Bruce Devlin	200 (Note: Shortened to 54 holes due to rain.)	−10	1 stroke	(United States) Bobby Clampett	Titirangi	
1982	ANZ	(Australia) Terry Gale	273	−7	Playoff	(Australia) Wayne Grady	Titirangi	
1981	ANZ	(Australia) Bob Shearer	265	−15	8 strokes	(Australia) Graham Marsh	Titirangi	
1980	ANZ	(Republic of Ireland) Eamonn Darcy	268	−12	2 strokes	(United States) Lanny Wadkins	Titirangi	
1979	NZGC	(Australia) David Graham	279	−5	8 strokes	(Australia) Rodger Davis	Royal Wellington	
1978	NZGC	(New Zealand) Bob Charles	273	−7	1 stroke	(Australia) Graham Marsh	Titirangi	
1977	NZGC	(Australia) David Good	278	−2	Playoff	(Australia) Bill Dunk	Titirangi	
New Zealand Airlines Classic
1976	NZGC	(Australia) Bob Shearer	271	−21	9 strokes	(United States) Bill Brask (New Zealand) John Lister	Russley	
1975	NZGC	(United States) Bill Brask	276	−8	1 stroke	(Australia) Peter Thomson	The Grange	
