= Bill Malley (golfer) =

American professional golfer

William Lawrence Malley (May 27, 1952 – August 15, 2023) was an American professional golfer.

== Early life and amateur career ==
Malley was born in Oakland, California. As an amateur player, he won the U.S. Amateur Public Links and NCGA Public Links Championship in 1984.

== Professional career ==
Malley played on the European Tour from 1985 to 1994. He had eight top-ten finishes, including second place at the 1987 Jersey Open and the 1990 Wang Four Stars. He also played on the European Seniors Tour in 2006 and 2007.

Malley played on the Nike Tour in 1995 where his best finish was T-8 at the Nike Boise Open.

== Death ==
Malley died in August 2023.

== Playoff record ==
European Tour playoff record (0–1)

No.	Year	Tournament	Opponents	Result
1	1990	Wang Four Stars	(Australia) Mike Clayton, (Australia) Rodger Davis, (Zimbabwe) Mark McNulty	Davis won with par on seventh extra hole Malley and McNulty eliminated by par on first hole
