= Sanctuary Cove, Queensland =

Sanctuary Cove
- Town
- The 2007 release of land, known as "Tristania", 2007

- Interactive map of Sanctuary Cove
- Coordinates: 27.857°S 153.375°E
- Country: Australia
- State: Queensland
- LGA: City of Gold Coast
- Location: 19.0 km (11.8 mi) N of Southport; 21.8 km (13.5 mi) N of Surfers Paradise; 64.0 km (39.8 mi) SE of Brisbane CBD

Government
  - State electorate: Broadwater
  - Federal division: Fadden
- Time zone: UTC+10:00 (AEST)
- Postcode: 4212

Sanctuary Cove is a town in the suburb of Hope Island in the City of Gold Coast, Queensland, Australia. It is a gated community and is a self-contained residential environment with its own shopping centre and entertainment facilities, with the addition of many of the facilities of a holiday resort, such as boating marinas and golf courses.

It was the second of such developments in Australia (after St Hubert's Island) and is notable for its impact in planning legislation in Queensland to allow it to proceed, due to the privatisation of such large areas of urban land.

== Geography ==
Sanctuary Cove covers an area of 474 hectares south of the Coomera River close to its mouth. To the east of Sanctuary Cove is Coomera Island. Sanctuary Cove continues to grow as remaining land is developed.

The community has two 18-hole championship golf courses, The Palms and The Pines. The former is open to the public; the latter is exclusive to members and resort guests.

== History ==
The property was developed by Mike Gore, was launched in 1986, and was opened in 1988. The opening event was hosted by Clive James, who described the community as a "purpose-built hideaway for the discerning Australian", and also featured a performance by Frank Sinatra, despite having vowed he would not return to Australia after an unsuccessful tour in 1974.

In 1989 the resort was purchased by EIE International Corporation, a Japanese real estate investment company, with financial assistance from the Long Term Credit Bank of Japan. In 1992, following the downturn in the Japanese economy, EIE went into receivership, along with the Sanctuary Cove development company (Discovery Bay Developments Pty Ltd). The property was bought by Mulpha Australia Limited in 2002. On 9 April 2010 a new golf clubhouse was launched.

== Resort ==
InterContinental operates a luxury resort hotel at Sanctuary Cove. The hotel was previously known as the Hyatt Regency Sanctuary Cove as it was managed by Hyatt. In late 2012, Intercontinental took over its management. During the COVID-19 pandemic, it underwent a renovation, at a cost of $6 million.

The hotel has 251 rooms. They are arranged in wings extending from the "Grand House", where the reception, the resort's two restaurants and a bar are located. The Grand House is flanked by a hot pool framed with Doric-style columns, and, beyond that, a terrace pool and beach lagoon.

The marina contains 300 moorings for all vessels including superyachts up to 36 m (118 ft) in length.

Not far away, other eating outlets at the community's Marine Village offer a variety of cuisines.

== Governance ==
Sanctuary Cove has a multi-tiered system of governance. Each Lot belongs to a Residential Body Corporate (RBC), of which there are 20. Lot owners elect an RBC Committee and Chairman.

== Events ==
It is home to the Sanctuary Cove International Boat Show which has been held annually since 1988.

The Sanctuary Cove Classic is also held at the Sanctuary Cove Golf & Country Club.
