= 1989 PGA Tour of Australia =

Golf tour season

1989 PGA Tour of Australia season
- Duration: 12 January 1989 – 17 December 1989
- Number of official events: 18
- Most wins: (Australia) Peter Senior (3)
- Order of Merit: (Australia) Peter Senior
- Rookie of the Year: (United States) Louis Brown

The 1989 PGA Tour of Australia was the 18th season on the PGA Tour of Australia, the main professional golf tour in Australia since it was formed in 1973.

== Schedule ==
The following table lists official events during the 1989 season.

Date	Tournament	Location	Purse (A$)	Winner (Note: The number in brackets after each winner's name is the number of PGA Tour of Australia events they had won up to and including that tournament. This information is only shown for PGA Tour of Australia members.)	OWGR points	Notes
15 Jan	Daikyo Palm Meadows Cup	Queensland	600,000	(United States) Curtis Strange (n/a)	30	
22 Jan	Coca-Cola Classic	Victoria	600,000	(Japan) Isao Aoki (n/a)	18	New tournament
29 Jan	Asthma Foundation Victorian PGA Championship	Victoria	100,000	(Australia) David Ecob (1)	8	
5 Feb	Victorian Open	Victoria	100,000	(Australia) Mike Clayton (3)	16	
12 Feb	Mercedes-Benz Australian Match Play Championship	Victoria	150,000	(Australia) Ossie Moore (3)	8	
19 Feb	Australian Masters	Victoria	450,000	(Australia) Greg Norman (27)	36	
26 Feb	Australian Tournament Players Championship	New South Wales	500,000	(Australia) Greg Norman (28)	22	
12 Mar	Monro Interiors Nedlands Masters	Western Australia	100,000	(United States) Louis Brown (1)	8	
19 Mar	Town and Country Joondalup Classic	Western Australia	100,000	(Australia) Brad King (1)	8	New tournament
22 Oct	Tattersall's Tasmanian Open	Tasmania	100,000	(Australia) Ian Stanley (8)	8	
29 Oct	Air New Zealand Shell Open	New Zealand	NZ$200,000	(United States) Don Bies (n/a)	16	
5 Nov	AMP New Zealand Open	New Zealand	NZ$150,000	(New Zealand) Greg Turner (2)	16	
12 Nov	Australian PGA Championship (Note: incorporating the New South Wales PGA Championship.)	New South Wales	500,000	(Australia) Peter Senior (7)	20	
19 Nov	Ford New South Wales Open	New South Wales	300,000	(Australia) Rodger Davis (9)	18	
26 Nov	West End South Australian Open	South Australia	150,000	(Zimbabwe) Nick Price (n/a)	8	
3 Dec	Australian Open	Victoria	500,000	(Australia) Peter Senior (8)	64	
10 Dec	Johnnie Walker Australian Classic	Victoria	1,000,000	(Australia) Peter Senior (9)	30	
17 Dec	Mirage Queensland Open	Queensland	300,000	(Australia) Brett Ogle (2)	8	

=== Unofficial events ===
The following events were sanctioned by the PGA Tour of Australasia, but did not carry official money, nor were wins official.

Date	Tournament	Location	Purse (A$)	Winner	OWGR points	Notes
15 Oct	Queensland PGA Championship	Queensland	100,000	(Australia) Zoran Zorkic	n/a	

== Order of Merit ==
The Order of Merit was based on prize money won during the season, calculated in Australian dollars.

Position	Player	Prize money (A$)
1	(Australia) Peter Senior	443,196
2	(Australia) Greg Norman	228,600
3	(Australia) Peter Fowler	221,900
4	(Australia) Rodger Davis	191,311
5	(Australia) Brett Ogle	130,206

== Awards ==
Award	Winner	Ref.
Rookie of the Year	(United States) Louis Brown	
