= Mike Clayton (golfer) =

Australian professional golfer (born 1957)

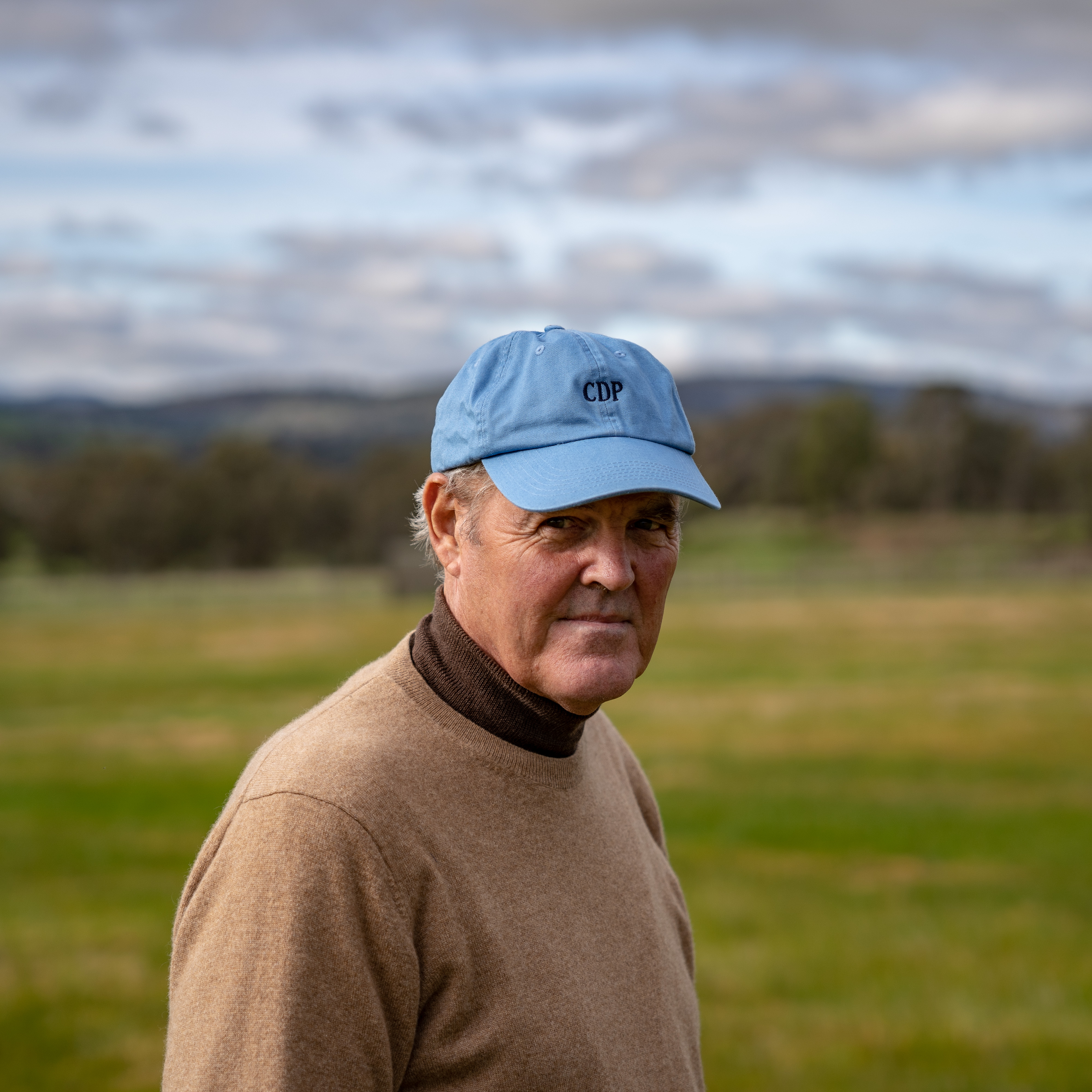

Personal information
- Full name: Michael Andrew Clayton
- Nationality: Australia
- Born: 30 May 1957 (age 69) Melbourne, Australia
- Height: 1.86 m (6 ft 1 in)

Career
- Sport: Golf
- Turned professional: 1981
- Former tours: European Tour; Asia Golf Circuit; PGA Tour of Australasia; European Senior Tour
- Professional wins: 10

Number of wins by tour
- European Tour: 1
- PGA Tour of Australasia: 6
- Other: 3

Best results in major championships
- Masters Tournament: DNP
- PGA Championship: DNP
- U.S. Open: DNP
- The Open Championship: T46: 1986

Michael Andrew Clayton (born 30 May 1957) is an Australian professional golfer, golf course architect and commentator on the game. He won the 1984 Timex Open on the European Tour and won six times on the PGA Tour of Australasia between 1982 and 1994.

== Amateur career ==
Clayton was born in Melbourne, Victoria. He had a very successful amateur career which included the 1978 Australian Amateur, and the Victorian Amateur in 1977 and 1981.

== Professional career ==
Clayton turned professional in 1981, the same year he joined the Australian Tour. He won his first tour event one year later and would win six more times between then and 1994.

Clayton played on the European Tour from 1982 to 2000, winning the 1984 Timex Open in Biarritz. He also won the 1984 Maekyung Open. His best finish on the Australian Order of Merit was 4th in 1994. He would never lose his playing status until he became eligible for the Australian Senior's Tour.

Clayton was famously brought to attention for his "Infamous Putt", of which resulted in a one stroke penalty. As his putt was traveling towards the hole, Clayton twirled his putter in the air, but it slipped from his hands - he then dived towards the putter to catch it and in doing so, moved the ball with the putter, after which the ball hit him as he lay on the green.

Clayton played on the European Seniors Tour. He was runner-up in the 2009 Jersey Seniors Classic, losing at the third playoff hole to Delroy Cambridge.

Clayton is now a golf course architect, having partnered with Geoff Ogilvy until 2019. In 2020 Clayton formed the firm Clayton, DeVries & Pont with architects Mike DeVries and Frank Pont.

Clayton designed Barnbougle Dunes in Bridport, Tasmania with Tom Doak and the Ranfurlie course at Amstel Golf Club, along with consultancy work at a number of Australian golf courses.

Clayton also regularly appears on golfing podcasts to discuss the state of the game and golf course architecture.

== Amateur wins ==
- 1977 Victorian Amateur Championship
- 1978 Australian Amateur, Korean Amateur
- 1981 Victorian Amateur Championship, Riversdale Cup, Dutch Amateur

== Professional wins (8) ==
=== European Tour wins (1) ===
No.	Date	Tournament	Winning score	Margin of victory	Runners-up
1	17 Jun 1984	Timex Open	−16 (67-65-61-67=260)	3 strokes	(United States) Peter Teravainen, (Scotland) Sam Torrance

European Tour playoff record (0–1)

No.	Year	Tournament	Opponents	Result
1	1990	Wang Four Stars	(Australia) Rodger Davis, (United States) Bill Malley, (Zimbabwe) Mark McNulty	Davis won with birdie on seventh extra hole Malley and McNulty eliminated by par on first hole

=== Asia Golf Circuit wins (1) ===
No.	Date	Tournament	Winning score	Margin of victory	Runners-up
1	15 Apr 1984	Maekyung Open	−5 (75-66-71-71=283)	1 stroke	(United States) John Jacobs, (Taiwan) Lu Hsi-chuen

=== PGA Tour of Australasia wins (6) ===
No.	Date	Tournament	Winning score	Margin of victory	Runner(s)-up
1	14 Feb 1982	Victorian Open	−7 (67-72-74-68=281)	3 strokes	(Australia) Bob Shearer
2	5 Feb 1984	Tasmanian Open	−13 (67-71-67-70=275)	2 strokes	(Australia) John Clifford, (Australia) Wayne Grady
3	5 Feb 1989	Victorian Open (2)	−3 (69-67-75-74=285)	2 strokes	(Australia) Ossie Moore
4	9 Feb 1992	Mercedes-Benz Australian Match Play Championship	4 and 3		(Australia) Peter McWhinney
5	30 Jan 1994	Heineken Classic	−9 (67-71-71-70=279)	3 strokes	(Australia) Wayne Smith
6	18 Dec 1994	Schweppes Coolum Classic	−11 (69-73-66-69=277)	4 strokes	(Australia) Andre Stolz

=== PGA of Australia Legends Tour wins (2) ===
note: this list is probably incomplete

- 2013 Craigieburn Legends Pro-Am (with Tim Elliot), Inside Golf Legends Pro-Am at the Dunes

== Playoff record ==
European Senior Tour playoff record (0–1)

No.	Year	Tournament	Opponent	Result
1	2009	Jersey Seniors Classic	(Jamaica) Delroy Cambridge	Lost to par on third extra hole

== Results in major championships ==
Tournament	1984	1985	1986	1987	1988	1989	1990	1991	1992	1993	1994	1995
The Open Championship	CUT	CUT	T46			CUT	T57		T59	CUT	CUT	CUT

Note: Clayton only played in The Open Championship.

Did not play

CUT = missed the half-way cut
"T" = tied

== Team appearances ==
Amateur

- Australian Men's Interstate Teams Matches (representing Victoria): 1976, 1977, 1978, 1979, 1980

Professional

- World Cup (representing Australia): 1982, 1994
- Hennessy Cognac Cup (representing the Rest of the World): 1984
- Alfred Dunhill Challenge (representing Australasia): 1995
