= 1990 PGA Tour of Australia =

Golf tour season

1990 PGA Tour of Australia season
- Duration: 11 January 1990 – 16 December 1990
- Number of official events: 13 (Note: One further tournament was scheduled but was cancelled.)
- Most wins: (United States) John Morse (2)
- Order of Merit: (Australia) Rodger Davis
- Rookie of the Year: (Sweden) Gabriel Hjertstedt

The 1990 PGA Tour of Australia was the 19th season on the PGA Tour of Australia, the main professional golf tour in Australia since it was formed in 1973.

== Schedule ==
The following table lists official events during the 1990 season.

Date	Tournament	Location	Purse (A$)	Winner (Note: The number in brackets after each winner's name is the number of PGA Tour of Australia events they had won up to and including that tournament. This information is only shown for PGA Tour of Australia members.)	OWGR points	Notes
14 Jan	Daikyo Palm Meadows Cup	Queensland	800,000	(Australia) Rodger Davis (10)	42	
21 Jan	Coca-Cola Classic	Victoria	700,000	(Northern Ireland) Ronan Rafferty (4)	32	
28 Jan	Vines Classic	Western Australia	700,000	(United States) Jeff Maggert (n/a)	22	New tournament
~~4 Feb~~	Victorian Open	Victoria	–	Cancelled	–	
11 Feb	Mercedes-Benz Australian Match Play Championship	Victoria	200,000	(Australia) David Iwasaki-Smith (1)	12	
18 Feb	Australian Masters	Victoria	500,000	(Australia) Greg Norman (29)	44	
11 Mar	Monro Interiors Nedlands Masters	Western Australia	150,000	(United States) John Morse (1)	12	
4 Nov	New South Wales Open	New South Wales	50,000	(Australia) Ken Trimble (1)	12	
11 Nov	Air New Zealand Shell Open	New Zealand	NZ$250,000	(Australia) Wayne Riley (3)	12	
18 Nov	West End South Australian Open	South Australia	150,000	(Australia) Mike Harwood (2)	12	
25 Nov	Australian PGA Championship (Note: incorporating the New South Wales PGA Championship.)	New South Wales	500,000	(Australia) Brett Ogle (3)	16	
2 Dec	Australian Open	New South Wales	600,000	(United States) John Morse (2)	42	
9 Dec	Johnnie Walker Australian Classic	Victoria	1,000,000	(New Zealand) Greg Turner (3)	40	
16 Dec	Coolum Classic (Note: incorporating the Queensland Open.)	Queensland	150,000	(Australia) Ian Baker-Finch (8)	12	New tournament

== Order of Merit ==
The Order of Merit was based on prize money won during the season, calculated in Australian dollars.

Position	Player	Prize money (A$)
1	(Australia) Rodger Davis	375,026
2	(United States) John Morse	264,049
3	(Australia) Brett Ogle	214,143
4	(New Zealand) Greg Turner	196,926
5	(Australia) Mike Harwood	184,224

== Awards ==
Award	Winner	Ref.
Rookie of the Year	(Sweden) Gabriel Hjertstedt	
