= Ian Baker-Finch =

Australian professional golfer (born 1960)

Personal information
- Full name: Ian Michael Baker-Finch
- Nicknames: Finchy, The Dark Shark, IBF
- Nationality: Australia
- Born: 24 October 1960 (age 66) Nambour, Queensland, Australia
- Height: 193 cm (6 ft 4 in)

Career
- Sport: Golf
- Turned professional: 1979
- Former tours: PGA Tour; European Tour; Japan Golf Tour; PGA Tour of Australasia
- Professional wins: 17
- Highest ranking: 10 (29 September 1991)

Number of wins by tour
- PGA Tour: 2
- European Tour: 2
- Japan Golf Tour: 3
- PGA Tour of Australasia: 10
- Other: 1

Best results in major championships (wins: 1)
- Masters Tournament: T6: 1992
- PGA Championship: T34: 1989
- U.S. Open: T13: 1992
- The Open Championship: Won: 1991

Ian Michael Baker-Finch (born 24 October 1960) is an Australian golfer and sports commentator best known for winning The Open Championship in 1991.

== Early life ==
Baker-Finch was born in Nambour, Queensland, Australia. He grew up in the same Queensland neighborhood as fellow golfers Greg Norman and Wayne Grady.

== Professional career ==
=== Australian and European Tours ===
Baker-Finch turned professional in 1979. He credits Jack Nicklaus as his greatest influence, saying that he based his game on Nicklaus' book, Golf My Way.

Baker-Finch began his professional career on the PGA Tour of Australasia, winning his first professional tournament, the New Zealand Open, in 1983. That victory earned him an entry to The Open Championship in 1984. He would make headlines by taking the 36-hole lead, holding onto the lead after three rounds but then shooting a disastrous last round 79 to finish ninth, much in the manner of Bobby Clampett who had endured a similar collapse two years previously.

Baker-Finch joined the European Tour, winning the 1985 Scandinavian Enterprise Open and finishing in the top-20 on the order of merit in both 1985 and 1986. At the same time he continued to play in Australasia in the Northern Hemisphere winter, picking up several further tournament titles there and occasionally played on the Japan Golf Tour.

=== PGA Tour ===
Baker-Finch first played on the PGA Tour as an invitee in 1985 and began to do so regularly in 1989, having qualified for tour membership by finishing third in the 1988 World Series of Golf. He won his first PGA Tour title at the 1989 Southwestern Bell Colonial, gaining him a two-year exemption on Tour. In 1990, he finished 16th on the PGA Tour money list, on the strength of three runner-up finishes and two third-place finishes.

Despite his steady career, with wins on four continents, including Asia, Baker-Finch was not generally counted as a member of the elite group of international golfers. When he won the 1991 Open Championship at Royal Birkdale, closing with a 64-66 to beat Mike Harwood by two strokes, he was considered a surprise champion. He had three other runner-up finishes that year as well and again qualified for the Tour Championship with a 13th-place finish on the money list. He ranked briefly in the top 10 of the Official World Golf Ranking that year.

Baker-Finch had a 10-year exemption from the PGA Tour for his Open Championship win, leaving him exempt until 2001. He achieved a runner-up finish in The Players Championship in 1992, but otherwise never came close to contending on the PGA Tour again. He picked up wins in Australia in 1992 and 1993 but his form then went into a steep and accelerating decline. He began to lose confidence in his game and tinkered with his swing often. His last top-10 finish on the PGA Tour was a tie for 10th in the 1994 Masters Tournament.

Baker-Finch then famously suffered a complete collapse of his game. The problems were often psychological: he would hit shots flawlessly on the practice range, and then go to the first tee and hit a weak drive into the wrong fairway. In the 1995 Open Championship at St Andrews, he notoriously hooked his first round tee shot at the first out-of-bounds on the left side of the fairway shared with the 18th, with attention focused on him as his playing partner was Arnold Palmer, competing in his final Open. In 1995 and 1996 he missed the cut, withdrew after one round or was disqualified in all 29 PGA Tour events that he entered.

Baker-Finch later said: "I lost my confidence. I got to the point where I didn't even want to be out on the golf course because I was playing so poorly. I would try my hardest but when I came out to play, I managed to find a way to miss the cut time and time again. It became a habit."

After shooting a 92 in the first round of the 1997 Open at Royal Troon, an extraordinarily bad score by tournament professional standards, Baker-Finch admitted that he cried in the locker room that afternoon. He withdrew from the championship after one round and retired from tournament golf.

In 2013, in a return to tournament form, Baker-Finch together with Bart Bryant won the age 60 to 69 exhibition portion of the Champions Tour Legends of Golf tournament.

=== Broadcasting career ===
After his game deserted him, Baker-Finch turned his interests to careers in broadcasting and golf course design and management. He was hired by ESPN and ABC Sports to comment on golf tournaments in 1998, and did so until 2006. During this time, Baker-Finch served as the lead analyst for ESPN and as a hole announcer for ABC, though on many occasions he filled in as ABC's lead analyst. In 2007, he was hired by CBS Sports as a hole announcer, a position he held until his retirement on August 3, 2025. During this era, Baker-Finch served as Gary Player's captain's assistant for the International team in the Presidents Cup in 2003, 2005 and 2007.

Reporting for CBS at the 2007 Barclays tournament, Baker-Finch was one of the thousands gathered around the 18th green as Rich Beem hit his approach shot. The errant shot hit straight on Baker-Finch's cheek and knocked him down, causing him to fall on his back behind the green. Baker-Finch recovered before Beem got to his ball.

== Personal life ==
Baker-Finch and his wife, Jennie, have two daughters; they live in North Palm Beach, Florida.

== Awards and honours ==
- On 22 June 2000, Baker-Finch was awarded the Australian Sports Medal for his golfing achievements.
- In 2009, Baker-Finch was inducted into the Queensland Sport Hall of Fame.

== Professional wins (17) ==
=== PGA Tour wins (2) ===
Legend
Major championships (1)
Other PGA Tour (1)

No.	Date	Tournament	Winning score	Margin of victory	Runner-up
1	21 May 1989	Southwestern Bell Colonial	−10 (65-70-65-70=270)	4 strokes	(United States) David Edwards
2	21 Jul 1991	The Open Championship	−8 (71-71-64-66=272)	2 strokes	(Australia) Mike Harwood

PGA Tour playoff record (0–1)

No.	Year	Tournament	Opponent	Result
1	1991	New England Classic	(United States) Bruce Fleisher	Lost to birdie on seventh extra hole

=== European Tour wins (2) ===
Legend
Major championships (1)
Other European Tour (1)

No.	Date	Tournament	Winning score	Margin of victory	Runner-up
1	4 Aug 1985	Scandinavian Enterprise Open	−14 (68-72-68-66=274)	2 strokes	(Australia) Graham Marsh
2	21 Jul 1991	The Open Championship	−8 (71-71-64-66=272)	2 strokes	(Australia) Mike Harwood

European Tour playoff record (0–1)

No.	Year	Tournament	Opponents	Result
1	1986	Bell's Scottish Open	(Northern Ireland) David Feherty, (Republic of Ireland) Christy O'Connor Jnr	Feherty won with birdie on second extra hole

=== PGA of Japan Tour wins (3) ===
No.	Date	Tournament	Winning score	Margin of victory	Runner-up
1	18 Oct 1987	Polaroid Cup Golf Digest Tournament	−9 (74-67-68-66=275)	4 strokes	(Japan) Kazushige Kono
2	10 Apr 1988	Pocari Sweat Open	−7 (73-68-66-70=277)	2 strokes	(Australia) Graham Marsh
3	17 Apr 1988	Bridgestone Aso Open	−6 (75-73-68-66=282)	1 stroke	(Japan) Tadami Ueno

=== PGA Tour of Australasia wins (10) ===
No.	Date	Tournament	Winning score	Margin of victory	Runner(s)-up
1	27 Nov 1983	New Zealand Open	E (71-66-72-71=280)	3 strokes	(New Zealand) Stuart Reese
2	13 May 1984	Town and Country WA-RAC Western Australian Open	−16 (70-67-67-68=272)	4 strokes	(Australia) Terry Gale
3	21 Oct 1984	National Panasonic New South Wales Open	−15 (69-70-68-70=277)	13 strokes	(Australia) Peter Senior
4	16 Dec 1984	Coca-Cola Queensland PGA Championship	−3 (69-74-70-72=285)	1 stroke	(Australia) Ossie Moore
5	10 Feb 1985	Victorian Open	−9 (73-65-72-69=279)	2 strokes	(Australia) Rodger Davis
6	8 Feb 1987	Robert Boyd Transport Australian Match Play Championship	5 and 4		(Australia) Ossie Moore
7	21 Feb 1988	Australian Masters	−9 (69-70-71-73=283)	Playoff	(Australia) Roger Mackay, (Australia) Craig Parry
8	16 Dec 1990	Coolum Classic (Note: incorporating the Queensland Open.)	−17 (66-67-67-71=271)	5 strokes	(England) Stephen Bennett, (Australia) Rodger Davis
9	26 Jan 1992	Vines Classic	−12 (71-67-66-72=276)	1 stroke	(United States) Jeff Maggert, (New Zealand) Frank Nobilo
10	22 Nov 1993	Ford Australian PGA Championship	−9 (69-69-73-64=275)	Playoff	(Australia) Peter Fowler, (New Zealand) Grant Waite

PGA Tour of Australasia playoff record (2–1)

No.	Year	Tournament	Opponent(s)	Result
1	1984	Victorian PGA Championship	(Australia) Wayne Riley	Lost to birdie on second extra hole
2	1988	Australian Masters	(Australia) Roger Mackay, (Australia) Craig Parry	Won with birdie on first extra hole
3	1993	Ford Australian PGA Championship	(Australia) Peter Fowler, (New Zealand) Grant Waite	Won with birdie on second extra hole

=== Senior wins (1) ===
- 2013 Liberty Mutual Insurance Legends of Golf - Raphael Division (with Bart Bryant)

== Major championships ==
=== Wins (1) ===
Year	Championship	54 holes	Winning score	Margin	Runner-up
1991	The Open Championship	Tied for lead	−8 (71-71-64-66=272)	2 strokes	(Australia) Mike Harwood

=== Results timeline ===
Tournament	1984	1985	1986	1987	1988	1989	1990	1991	1992	1993	1994	1995	1996	1997
Masters Tournament		CUT					CUT	T7	T6	T54	T10	CUT	CUT	
U.S. Open								T44	T13	T19	CUT	CUT	CUT	
The Open Championship	T9	T20	CUT	CUT	CUT	T30	T6	1	T19	T70	CUT	CUT	CUT	WD
PGA Championship						T34	T57	CUT	T69	66	CUT	CUT		

Win
Top 10
Did not play

CUT = missed the half way cut
WD = Withdrew
"T" indicates a tie for a place.

=== Summary ===
Tournament	Wins	2nd	3rd	Top-5	Top-10	Top-25	Events	Cuts made
Masters Tournament	0	0	0	0	3	3	8	4
U.S. Open	0	0	0	0	0	2	6	3
The Open Championship	1	0	0	1	3	5	14	7
PGA Championship	0	0	0	0	0	0	7	4
Totals	1	0	0	1	6	10	35	18

- Most consecutive cuts made – 9 (1992 Masters – 1994 Masters)
- Longest streak of top-10s – 1 (six times)

== Results in The Players Championship ==
Tournament	1989	1990	1991	1992	1993	1994	1995	1996
The Players Championship	CUT	T46	T41	T2	T39	T69	WD	CUT

Top 10

CUT = missed the halfway cut
WD = withdrew
"T" indicates a tie for a place

== Team appearances ==
- World Cup (representing Australia): 1985
- Four Tours World Championship (representing Australasia): 1985, 1986, 1987, 1988, 1989, 1990 (winners), 1991
- Dunhill Cup (representing Australia): 1989, 1992

== See also ==
- List of men's major championships winning golfers
