= Australian Senior Open =

Handa Australian Senior Open
Tournament information
- Location: Perth, Western Australia, Australia
- Established: 1995
- Course: Royal Perth Golf Club
- Par: 72
- Length: 6,615 yards (6,049 m)
- Tour: European Senior Tour
- Format: Stroke play
- Prize fund: A$400,000
- Month played: November
- Final year: 2012

Tournament record score
- Aggregate: 207 Peter Senior (2010); 207 Peter Fowler (2012)
- To par: −9 as above

Final champion
- (Australia) Peter Fowler
- Location in Australia Location in Western Australia

The Australian Senior Open was an event on the PGA Legends Tour. It was run by Golf Australia. From 2007 to 2012 it was hosted by ISPS Handa and titled as the Handa Australian Senior Open. The final event was in 2012. The 2010 event was co-sanctioned with the European Senior Tour and was the first event of the 2011 European Senior Tour season.

The Senior Open was revived in 2007 by Haruhisa Handa, president of the International Sports Promotion Society. In 2011, the tournament was co-sanctioned by the European Senior Tour.

== Winners ==
Year	Tour (Note: EST − European Senior Tour.)	Winner	Score	To par	Margin of victory	Runner(s)-up	Venue
Handa Australian Senior Open
2012		(Australia) Peter Fowler	207	−9	6 strokes	(Australia) Mike Harwood (Australia) David Merriman	Royal Perth
2011		(England) Gary Wolstenholme	212	−4	1 stroke	(Australia) Terry Price	Lake Karrinyup
2010	EST	(Australia) Peter Senior	207	−9	3 strokes	(Scotland) Sandy Lyle	Royal Perth
2009		(Australia) Mike Harwood	210	−6	Playoff	(Australia) Mike Clayton (Australia) Peter Senior	Royal Perth
2008		(Australia) Wayne Grady (2)	210	−3	2 strokes	(Australia) David Merriman	Concord
2007		(Australia) Wayne Grady	210	−3	1 stroke	(Australia) David Merriman	Concord
Australian Senior Open
1997–2006: No tournament
1996		(Japan) Hiroshi Tahara	296	+12	1 stroke	(Australia) Bob Shaw	Spring Valley
1995		(Australia) Noel Ratcliffe	290		4 strokes	(Australia) John Klatt (Japan) Hiroshi Tahara	Yarra Yarra
