= 1988 PGA Tour of Australia =

Golf tour season

1988 PGA Tour of Australia season
- Duration: 3 December 1987 – 18 December 1988
- Number of official events: 20
- Most wins: (Australia) Greg Norman (4)
- Order of Merit: (Australia) Greg Norman
- Rookie of the Year: (Australia) Bradley Hughes

The 1988 PGA Tour of Australia was the 17th season on the PGA Tour of Australia, the main professional golf tour in Australia since it was formed in 1973.

== Schedule ==
The following table lists official events during the 1988 season.

| Date | Tournament | Location | Purse (A$) | Winner (Note: The number in brackets after each winner's name is the number of PGA Tour of Australia events they had won up to and including that tournament. This information is only shown for PGA Tour of Australia members.) | OWGR points | Notes |
|---|---|---|---|---|---|---|
| 6 Dec | Air New Zealand Shell Open | New Zealand | NZ$200,000 | (United States) Mike Colandro (1) | 20 | |
| 13 Dec | Nissan-Mobil New Zealand Open | New Zealand | NZ$150,000 | (Northern Ireland) Ronan Rafferty (2) | 18 | |
| 10 Jan | Sanctuary Cove Classic | Queensland | 400,000 | (United States) Curtis Strange (n/a) | 24 | New tournament |
| 31 Jan | Daikyo Palm Meadows Cup | Queensland | 500,000 | (Australia) Greg Norman (23) | 32 | New tournament |
| 7 Feb | Mercedes-Benz Australian Match Play Championship | Victoria | 100,000 | (Northern Ireland) Ronan Rafferty (3) | 12 | |
| 14 Feb | Victorian Open | Victoria | 100,000 | (United States) Jim Benepe (n/a) | 18 | |
| 21 Feb | Australian Masters | Victoria | 325,000 | (Australia) Ian Baker-Finch (7) | 40 | |
| 28 Feb | ESP Open | Australian Capital Territory | 250,000 | (Australia) Greg Norman (24) | 22 | New tournament |
| 6 Mar | Australian Tournament Players Championship | New South Wales | 300,000 | (Australia) Greg Norman (25) | 22 | New tournament |
| 9 Oct | Drinnan Motors Queensland Open | Queensland | 50,000 | (Australia) Brett Officer (1) | 8 | |
| 16 Oct | Tasmanian Open | Tasmania | 100,000 | (Australia) Brett Ogle (1) | 8 | |
| 23 Oct | Panasonic New South Wales Open | New South Wales | 200,000 | (Australia) Greg Norman (25) | 18 | |
| 30 Oct | Town and Country Western Australian Open | Western Australia | 100,000 | (Australia) Bradley Hughes (1) | 8 | |
| 6 Nov | Australian PGA Championship (Note: incorporating the New South Wales PGA Championship.) | New South Wales | 475,000 | (Australia) Wayne Grady (2) | 20 | |
| 12 Nov | West End South Australian Open | South Australia | 100,000 | (Scotland) Gordon Brand Jnr (n/a) | 8 | |
| 20 Nov | Ricky May Classic | New South Wales | 100,000 | (Australia) David Merriman (1) | n/a | New tournament |
| 27 Nov | National Panasonic Australian Open | New South Wales | 350,000 | (United States) Mark Calcavecchia (n/a) | 38 | |
| 4 Dec | Bicentennial Classic | Victoria | 1,500,000 | (Australia) Rodger Davis (8) | 32 | New tournament |
| 11 Dec | Air New Zealand Shell Open | New Zealand | NZ$200,000 | (Australia) Terry Gale (15) | 16 | |
| 18 Dec | Nissan-Mobil New Zealand Open | New Zealand | NZ$150,000 | (Australia) Ian Stanley (7) | 16 | |

== Order of Merit ==
The Order of Merit was based on prize money won during the season, calculated in Australian dollars.

| Position | Player | Prize money (A$) |
|---|---|---|
| 1 | (Australia) Greg Norman | 303,822 |
| 2 | (Australia) Wayne Grady | 136,589 |
| 3 | (Australia) Roger Mackay | 100,171 |
| 4 | (Australia) Ian Baker-Finch | 92,209 |
| 5 | (Australia) Peter Senior | 91,507 |

== Awards ==
| Award | Winner | Ref. |
|---|---|---|
| Rookie of the Year | (Australia) Bradley Hughes | |
