= Timex Open =

Tournament information
- Location: Biarritz, France
- Established: 1980
- Course: Biarritz Golf Club
- Par: 69
- Tour: European Tour
- Format: Stroke play
- Prize fund: £73,681
- Month played: June
- Final year: 1984

Tournament record score
- Aggregate: 260 Mike Clayton (1984)
- To par: −16 as above

Final champion
- (Australia) Mike Clayton
- Location in France Location in Nouvelle-Aquitaine

The Timex Open was a professional golf tournament. The tournament was held at Biarritz Golf Club in Biarritz, France. The tournament was originally a domestic event before transitioning into a European Tour event in 1983 and 1984.

== Winners ==
Year	Winner	Score	To par	Margin of victory	Runner(s)-up	Ref.
1984	(Australia) Mike Clayton	260	−16	3 strokes	(United States) Peter Teravainen (Scotland) Sam Torrance	
1983	(Spain) Manuel Ballesteros	262	−14	2 strokes	(England) Nick Faldo	
1982	(United States) Lennie Clements	267	−9	5 strokes	(United States) Barry Jaeckel	
1981	(France) Géry Watine (2)					
1980	(France) Géry Watine					
