= 1991 PGA Tour of Australasia =

Golf tour season

1991 PGA Tour of Australasia season
- Duration: 10 January 1991 – 15 December 1991
- Number of official events: 15 (Note: A further two tournaments were scheduled but were cancelled.)
- Most wins: (Australia) Rodger Davis (2) (Australia) Peter Senior (2)
- Order of Merit: (Australia) Rodger Davis

The 1991 PGA Tour of Australasia was the 20th season on the PGA Tour of Australasia, the main professional golf tour in Australia and New Zealand since it was formed in 1973.

== Schedule ==
The following table lists official events during the 1991 season.

Date	Tournament	Location	Purse (A$)	Winner (Note: The number in brackets after each winner's name is the number of PGA Tour of Australasia events they had won up to and including that tournament. This information is only shown for PGA Tour of Australasia members.)	OWGR points	Notes
13 Jan	Daikyo Palm Meadows Cup	Queensland	1,200,000	(New Zealand) Greg Turner (4)	36	
20 Jan	SxL Sanctuary Cove Classic	Queensland	700,000	(Australia) Rodger Davis (11)	22	
27 Jan	Vines Classic	Western Australia	700,000	(United States) Blaine McCallister (n/a)	24	
10 Feb	Mercedes-Benz Australian Match Play Championship	Victoria	200,000	(United States) Chris Patton (1)	12	
17 Feb	Pyramid Australian Masters	Victoria	500,000	(Australia) Peter Senior (10)	32	
~~24 Feb~~	Australian Tournament Players Championship	Victoria	–	Cancelled	–	
24 Feb; ~~17 Mar~~	Tattersall's Tasmanian Open	Tasmania	150,000	(Australia) Chris Gray (1)	12	
10 Mar	AMP New Zealand Open	New Zealand	NZ$250,000	(Australia) Rodger Davis (12)	12	
6 Oct	Rothmans Malaysian Masters	Malaysia	325,000	(Australia) Stewart Ginn (9)	8	New to PGA Tour of Australasia
13 Oct	Perak Masters	Malaysia	150,000	(Australia) Todd Power (1)	8	New tournament
20 Oct	Pioneer Singapore PGA Championship	Singapore	150,000	(United States) Peter Teravainen (n/a)	8	New to PGA Tour of Australasia
10 Nov	Air New Zealand Shell Open	New Zealand	NZ$300,000	(United States) John Morse (3)	12	
17 Nov	West End South Australian Open	South Australia	200,000	(Australia) Brett Ogle (4)	12	
24 Nov	Ford Australian PGA Championship	New South Wales	250,000	(Australia) Wayne Grady (3)	12	
1 Dec	Australian Open	Victoria	700,000	(Australia) Wayne Riley (4)	36	
8 Dec	Johnnie Walker Australian Classic	New South Wales	1,000,000	(Australia) Peter Senior (11)	34	
~~15 Dec~~	Coolum Classic	Queensland	–	Cancelled	–	

=== Unofficial events ===
The following events were sanctioned by the PGA Tour of Australasia, but did not carry official money, nor were wins official.

Date	Tournament	Location	Purse (A$)	Winner	OWGR points	Notes
3 Nov	Victorian Open	Victoria	50,000	(Australia) Robert Allenby (a)	n/a	

== Order of Merit ==
The Order of Merit was based on prize money won during the season, calculated in Australian dollars.

Position	Player	Prize money (A$)
1	(Australia) Rodger Davis	343,277
2	(New Zealand) Greg Turner	305,004
3	(Australia) Peter Senior	293,285
4	(New Zealand) Frank Nobilo	224,796
5	(Australia) Wayne Grady	163,593
