= U-Bix Classic =

Tournament information
- Location: Canberra, Australian Capital Territory, Australia
- Established: 1984
- Course: Federal Golf Club
- Par: 73
- Tour: PGA Tour of Australasia
- Format: Stroke play
- Prize fund: A$100,000
- Month played: January
- Final year: 1987

Tournament record score
- Aggregate: 273 Wayne Riley (1985); 273 Peter Senior (1987)
- To par: −19 as above

Final champion
- (Australia) Peter Senior
- Location in Australia Location in Australian Capital Territory

The U-Bix Classic was a golf tournament held in Australia from 1984 to 1987 at The Federal Golf Club, Canberra. The event was called the Honeywell Classic in 1984. The tournament was held during November in 1984 and 1985, and again in January 1987, with no edition in 1986 due to being rescheduled from November to January. This proved to be the last time the tournament was held as sponsors Konica withdrew their support later in the year. The event incorporated the New South Wales PGA Championship.

Prize money for the U-Bix Classic was A$35,000 in 1984, A$50,000 in 1985 and A$100,000 in 1987.

== Winners ==
Year	Winner	Score	To par	Margin of victory	Runner-up	Winner's share (A$)	Ref.
U-Bix Classic
1987	(Australia) Peter Senior (2)	273	−19	1 stroke	(Australia) Gerry Taylor	18,000	
1986: No tournament
1985	(Australia) Wayne Riley	273	−19	3 strokes	(Australia) George Serhan	9,000	
Honeywell Classic
1984	(Australia) Peter Senior	274	−18	2 strokes	(Australia) Ossie Moore	6,300	
