= Sanctuary Cove Classic =

SxL Sanctuary Cove Classic
Tournament information
- Location: Hope Island, Queensland, Australia
- Established: 1988
- Course: Sanctuary Cove Golf & Country Club
- Par: 72
- Tour: PGA Tour of Australasia
- Format: Stroke play
- Prize fund: A$700,000
- Month played: January
- Final year: 1992

Tournament record score
- Aggregate: 272 Curtis Strange (1988)
- To par: −16 as above

Final champion
- (Australia) Rodger Davis
- Location in Australia Location in Queensland

The Sanctuary Cove Classic was a golf tournament held in Australia from 1988 to 1992 at Sanctuary Cove Golf and Country Club, Sanctuary Cove, Hope Island, Queensland. The event was not played in 1989 or 1990 and was called the SxL Sanctuary Cove Classic in 1991 and 1992. The 1991 and 1992 events were played on the Pines course. Prize money was A$400,000 in 1988, A$700,000 in 1991 and 1992.

== Winners ==
Year	Winner	Score	To par	Margin of victory	Runner-up	Winner's share (A$)	Ref.
SxL Sanctuary Cove Classic
1992	(Australia) Rodger Davis (2)	283	−5	2 strokes	(New Zealand) Grant Waite	126,000	
1991	(Australia) Rodger Davis	278	−10	1 stroke	(New Zealand) Frank Nobilo	126,000	
Sanctuary Cove Classic
1989–90: No tournament
1988	(United States) Curtis Strange	272	−16	1 stroke	(Wales) Ian Woosnam	72,000	
