= Federal Golf Club =

Golf club in Australia

Club information
- Location: Red Hill, Australian Capital Territory
- Established: 1933; 93 years ago
- Type: private
- Website: https://federalgolf.com.au/

Federal Golf Club is a golf club in Australia. It is located in Red Hill, Australian Capital Territory, and was formed in 1933. It has hosted several notable golf tournament's including U-Bix Classic.
