= Rodger Davis =

Australian professional golfer (born 1951)

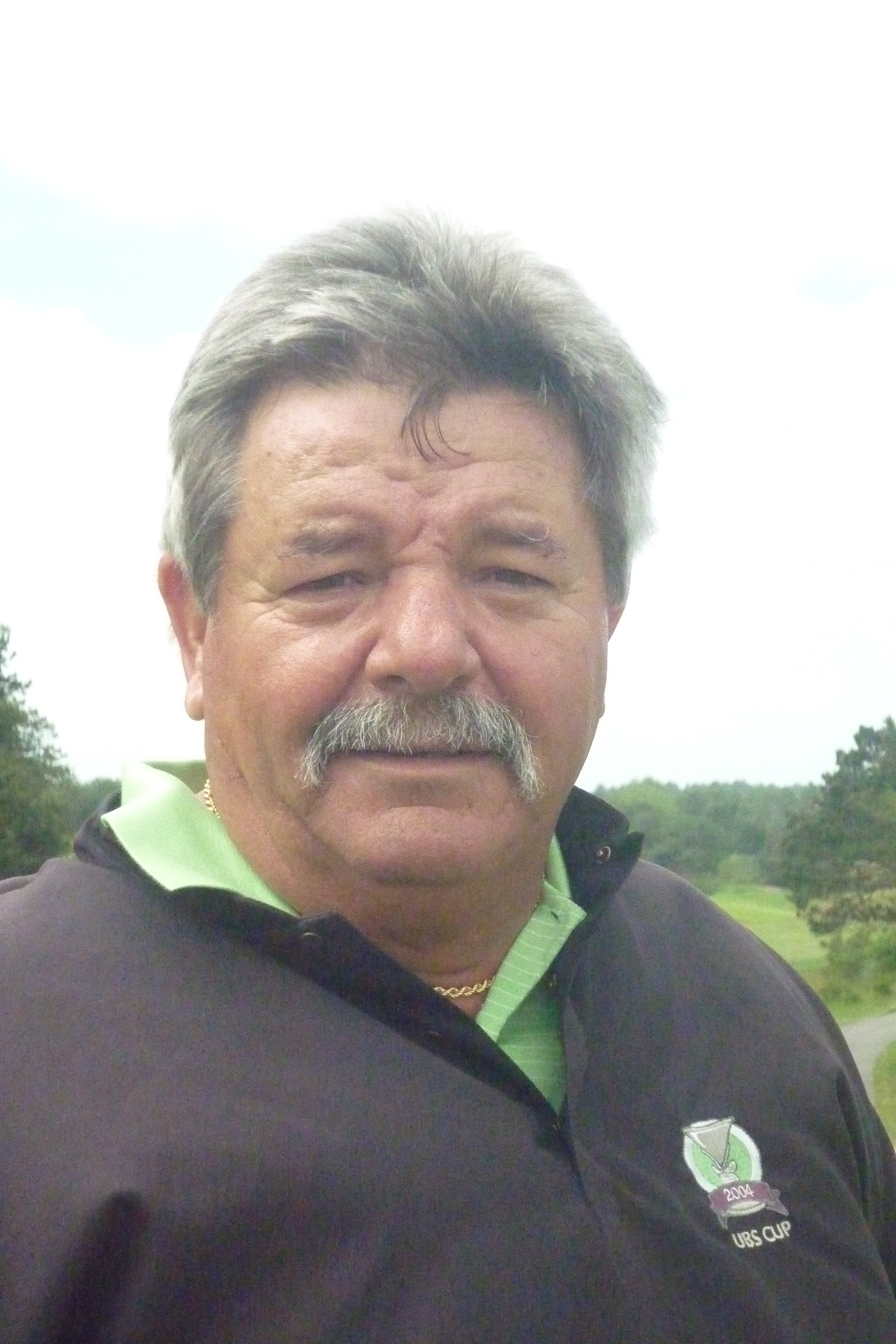

Personal information
- Full name: Rodger Miles Davis
- Nationality: Australia
- Born: 18 May 1951 (age 75) Sydney, Australia
- Height: 1.78 m (5 ft 10 in)
- Weight: 90 kg (198 lb; 14 st 2 lb)

Career
- Sport: Golf
- Turned professional: 1974
- Former tours: PGA Tour of Australasia; European Tour; Champions Tour; European Seniors Tour
- Professional wins: 41
- Highest ranking: 7 (19 July 1987)

Number of wins by tour
- European Tour: 7
- PGA Tour of Australasia: 14
- PGA Tour Champions: 1
- Other: 20

Best results in major championships
- Masters Tournament: 29th: 1988
- PGA Championship: T52: 1988
- U.S. Open: T36: 1987
- The Open Championship: T2: 1987

Achievements and awards
- New Zealand Golf Circuit money list winner: 1979–80
- PGA Tour of Australasia Order of Merit winner: 1990, 1991

Rodger Miles Davis (born 18 May 1951) is an Australian professional golfer.

== Career ==
Davis was born in Sydney, Australia.

In 1974, Davis turned professional and spent his regular career playing mainly on the PGA Tour of Australasia and the European Tour.

He won the PGA Tour of Australasia Order of Merit in 1990 and 1991. He made the top ten of the European Tour Order of Merit four times in the late 1980s and early 1990s. His seven European Tour wins included two of Europe's most prestigious tournaments; the British PGA Championship, which he won in 1986 at Wentworth Club, and the season ending Volvo Masters, which he claimed in 1991. His best finish on the PGA Tour was a tie for fifth at the 1986 NEC World Series of Golf.

Davis was ranked in the top 10 of the Official World Golf Ranking for 29 weeks between 1987 and 1992. In the 1987 Open Championship, Davis shot a first round of 64 at Muirfield to lead the tournament by three strokes after the opening round. He finished the championship in a tie for 2nd place with American Paul Azinger, a stroke behind the champion Nick Faldo. The 1987 Open Championship is Davis' best finish in a major championship.

Davis represented Australia in team competitions several times, and was a member of his country's winning three-man team at the 1986 Alfred Dunhill Cup.

As a senior, he played mainly on the U.S.-based Champions Tour (2001–05), where he won once, the 2003 Toshiba Senior Classic. He played on the European Seniors Tour in 2011 and 2012.

== Amateur wins ==
this list may be incomplete

- 1973 Lake Macquarie Amateur

== Professional wins (41) ==
=== European Tour wins (7) ===
Legend
Tour Championships (1)
Other European Tour (6)

No.	Date	Tournament	Winning score	Margin of victory	Runner(s)-up
1	11 Jul 1981	State Express Classic	−5 (70-68-74-71=283)	2 strokes	(Australia) Greg Norman
2	26 May 1986	Whyte & Mackay PGA Championship	−7 (70-72-71-68=281)	Playoff	(Republic of Ireland) Des Smyth
3	12 Jun 1988	Wang Four Stars National Pro-Celebrity	−13 (69-63-71-72=275)	1 stroke	(Spain) José María Cañizares, (Republic of Ireland) Eamonn Darcy
4	29 Apr 1990	Peugeot Spanish Open	−11 (74-69-68-66=277)	1 stroke	(England) Nick Faldo, (Australia) Peter Fowler, (West Germany) Bernhard Langer
5	17 Jun 1990	Wang Four Stars	−17 (67-72-65-67=271)	Playoff	(Australia) Mike Clayton, (United States) Bill Malley, (Zimbabwe) Mark McNulty
6	27 Oct 1991	Volvo Masters	−4 (68-73-68-71=280)	1 stroke	(England) Nick Faldo
7	2 May 1993	Air France Cannes Open	−13 (68-64-69-70=271)	Playoff	(Zimbabwe) Mark McNulty

European Tour playoff record (3–2)

No.	Year	Tournament	Opponent(s)	Result
1	1986	Whyte & Mackay PGA Championship	(Republic of Ireland) Des Smyth	Won with bogey on third extra hole
2	1986	German Open	(West Germany) Bernhard Langer	Lost to birdie on fifth extra hole
3	1990	Wang Four Stars	(Australia) Mike Clayton, (United States) Bill Malley, (Zimbabwe) Mark McNulty	Won with birdie on seventh extra hole Malley and McNulty eliminated by par on first hole
4	1991	Mercedes German Masters	(Germany) Bernhard Langer	Lost to par on first extra hole
5	1993	Air France Cannes Open	(Zimbabwe) Mark McNulty	Won with par on first extra hole

=== PGA Tour of Australasia wins (14) ===
No.	Date	Tournament	Winning score	Margin of victory	Runner(s)-up
1	14 Aug 1977	Nedlands Masters	−11 (69-69-67-72=277)	2 strokes	(Australia) Allen Cooper
2	9 Oct 1977	McCallum's South Coast Open	−13 (67-66-69-69=271)	4 strokes	(Australia) Terry Gale
3	18 Feb 1979	Victorian Open	+3 (75-73-70-73=291)	Playoff	(Australia) Geoff Parslow, (South Africa) Gary Player
4	10 Nov 1985	Victorian PGA Championship	−18 (68-66-69-67=270)	7 strokes	(Australia) Ossie Moore
5	16 Nov 1986	National Panasonic Australian Open	−10 (67-71-72-68=278)	1 stroke	(Australia) Ian Baker-Finch, (Australia) Graham Marsh, (Australia) Bob Shearer
6	30 Nov 1986 (1987 season)	Air New Zealand Shell Open	−13 (63-65-67-72=267)	3 strokes	(Australia) Bob Shearer, (United States) Curtis Strange
7	7 Dec 1986 (1987 season)	Nissan-Mobil New Zealand Open	−18 (67-62-65-68=262)	8 strokes	(Australia) Bob Shearer
8	4 Dec 1988	Bicentennial Classic	−17 (68-67-68-68=271)	Playoff	(United States) Fred Couples
9	19 Nov 1989	Ford New South Wales Open	−15 (71-65-71-70=277)	9 strokes	(Australia) Bradley Hughes
10	14 Jan 1990	Daikyo Palm Meadows Cup	−17 (64-67-71-69=271)	Playoff	(United States) Curtis Strange
11	20 Jan 1991	SxL Sanctuary Cove Classic	−10 (70-70-67-71=278)	1 stroke	(New Zealand) Frank Nobilo
12	10 Mar 1991	AMP New Zealand Open (2)	−11 (67-66-73-67=273)	2 strokes	(New Zealand) Frank Nobilo
13	12 Jan 1992	SxL Sanctuary Cove Classic (2)	−5 (72-67-67-77=283)	2 strokes	(New Zealand) Grant Waite
14	13 Dec 1992	Coolum Classic	−17 (68-70-68-65=271)	7 strokes	(Australia) Mike Clayton

PGA Tour of Australasia playoff record (3–1)

No.	Year	Tournament	Opponent(s)	Result
1	1979	Victorian Open	(Australia) Geoff Parslow, (South Africa) Gary Player	Won with birdie on second extra hole
2	1980	Australian Masters	(United States) Gene Littler	Lost to bogey on first extra hole
3	1988	Bicentennial Classic	(United States) Fred Couples	Won with par on second extra hole
4	1990	Daikyo Palm Meadows Cup	(United States) Curtis Strange	Won with eagle on second extra hole

=== Other Australasian wins (5) ===
- 1977 Rosebud Invitational
- 1978 South Australia Open, Nedlands Masters, West Australia Open, Mandurah Open

=== Other wins (1) ===
- 1998 Mauritius Open

=== Champions Tour wins (1) ===
No.	Date	Tournament	Winning score	Margin of victory	Runner-up
1	23 Mar 2003	Toshiba Senior Classic	−16 (65-64-68=213)	4 strokes	(United States) Larry Nelson

=== PGA of Australia Legends Tour wins (12) ===
note: this list is probably incomplete

- 2009 (1) Handa Australian Senior Open
- 2013 (5) Pak 'n' Save North Shore Legends Pro-Am (with Tim Elliot), Mini Jumbuk PGA Legends Pro-Am, National Australia Bank Kooyonga Legends Pro-Am (with Bryan Wearne), Bargara Legends Pro-Am, Suttons Hyundai Arncliffe Legends Pro-Am
- 2014 (2) New Zealand PGA Senior Championship, Rosnay Legends Pro-Am (with David Merriman)
- 2015 (3) City of Greater Bendigo Heathcote Legends Pro-Am, Bermagui Legends Pro-Am (with Mike Harwood), Coca-Cola Australian PGA Seniors Championship
- 2019 (1) Brisbane Legends Pro-Am (with Peter Lonard)

=== Other senior wins (1) ===
- 2013 Citi & BOQ Charity Invitational (with Hugh Dolan)

== Results in major championships ==
Tournament	1977	1978	1979
Masters Tournament			
U.S. Open			
The Open Championship	T52	T52	5
PGA Championship			

Tournament	1980	1981	1982	1983	1984	1985	1986	1987	1988	1989
Masters Tournament									29	
U.S. Open								T36	T47	
The Open Championship	T38	T39	CUT	T26		CUT	CUT	T2	T20	CUT
PGA Championship								CUT	T52	

Tournament	1990	1991	1992	1993	1994	1995	1996	1997	1998
Masters Tournament			63						
U.S. Open		T46	CUT						
The Open Championship	CUT	T12	CUT	T24	CUT			T33	T44
PGA Championship	CUT			CUT					

Top 10
Did not play

CUT = missed the half-way cut
"T" indicates a tie for a place

=== Summary ===
Tournament	Wins	2nd	3rd	Top-5	Top-10	Top-25	Events	Cuts made
Masters Tournament	0	0	0	0	0	0	2	2
U.S. Open	0	0	0	0	0	0	4	3
The Open Championship	0	1	0	2	2	5	19	12
PGA Championship	0	0	0	0	0	0	4	1
Totals	0	1	0	2	2	5	29	18

- Most consecutive cuts made – 5 (1977 Open Championship – 1981 Open Championship)
- Longest streak of top-10s – 1 (twice)

== Team appearances ==
- World Cup (representing Australia): 1985, 1987, 1991, 1993
- Dunhill Cup (representing Australia): 1986 (winners), 1987, 1988, 1990, 1992, 1993
- Four Tours World Championship (representing Australasia): 1986, 1987, 1988, 1990 (winners), 1991
- UBS Cup (representing the Rest of the World): 2002, 2003 (tie), 2004
