= Johnnie Walker Australian Classic =

Tournament information
- Location: Melbourne, Australia
- Established: 1988
- Course: Royal Melbourne Golf Club
- Par: 72
- Tour: PGA Tour of Australasia
- Format: Stroke play
- Prize fund: A$700,000
- Month played: December
- Final year: 1992

Tournament record score
- Aggregate: 271 Rodger Davis (1988); 271 Fred Couples (1988)
- To par: −17 as above

Final champion
- (Australia) Robert Allenby
- Location in Australia Location in Victoria

The Johnnie Walker Australian Classic was a golf tournament held in Australia from 1988 to 1992. It was first played as the Bicentennial Classic to celebrate the Australian Bicentenary. From 1989 it was sponsored by United Distillers, using their Johnnie Walker Scotch whisky brand, and officially titled as the Johnnie Walker Australian Classic, and then the Johnnie Walker Classic from 1991.

It was held at the Royal Melbourne Golf Club, Melbourne, except in 1991 when it was played at The Lakes Golf Club. Prize money was A$1,500,000 in 1988, A$1,000,000 from 1989 to 1991, and A$700,000 in 1992. The tournament was played for the final time in 1992 as a result of United Distillers ending their sponsorship in April 1993.

After the tournament was cancelled in 1993, the Johnnie Walker Asian Classic dropped the word "Asian" and took on the Johnnie Walker Classic title.

== Winners ==
Year	Winner	Score	To par	Margin of victory	Runner(s)-up	Winner's share (A$)	Venue	Ref.
Johnnie Walker Australian Classic
1992	(Australia) Robert Allenby	275	−13	5 strokes	(Australia) Peter Senior	126,000	Royal Melbourne	
1991	(Australia) Peter Senior (2)	282	−10	1 stroke	(Australia) Rodger Davis (New Zealand) Frank Nobilo	180,000	The Lakes	
1990	(New Zealand) Greg Turner	276	−8	4 strokes	(Australia) Rodger Davis	180,000	Royal Melbourne	
1989	(Australia) Peter Senior	276	−12	5 strokes	(Australia) Greg Norman	180,000	Royal Melbourne	
Bicentennial Classic
1988	(Australia) Rodger Davis	271	−17	Playoff (Note: Davis won with eagle on second extra hole)	(United States) Fred Couples	500,000	Royal Melbourne	
