= Wayne Grady =

Australian professional golfer (born 1957)

Personal information
- Full name: Wayne Desmond Grady
- Nationality: Australia
- Born: 26 July 1957 (age 69) Brisbane, Australia
- Height: 175 cm (5 ft 9 in)
- Weight: 78 kg (172 lb)
- Spouse: Lyn Grady
- Children: 1

Career
- Sport: Golf
- Turned professional: 1978
- Former tours: PGA Tour; Champions Tour
- Professional wins: 10
- Highest ranking: 25 (17 March 1991)

Number of wins by tour
- PGA Tour: 2
- European Tour: 2
- PGA Tour of Australasia: 3
- Other: 3 (regular); 2 (senior)

Best results in major championships (wins: 1)
- Masters Tournament: T13: 1992
- PGA Championship: Won: 1990
- U.S. Open: T17: 1992
- The Open Championship: T2: 1989

Wayne Desmond Grady (born 26 July 1957) is an Australian professional golfer.

== Career ==
In 1957, Grady was born in Brisbane, Australia.

In 1978, Grady turned professional. He began his career on the PGA Tour of Australia and had much early success, winning the 1978 CBA West Lakes Classic. He also played extensively on the European Tour during this era, winning the 1984 German Open.

Shortly thereafter, Grady earned membership on the PGA Tour at 1984 PGA Tour Qualifying School. In 1989, Grady won the Westchester Classic. However, Grady is probably best known for his 1990 PGA Championship victory where he defeated Fred Couples down the stretch. He was also runner-up at the 1989 Open Championship, losing with fellow Australian Greg Norman in a playoff to American Mark Calcavecchia.

As of 2005 Grady is director of the PGA Tour of Australasia. He owns a golf course design business and a golf tour company, and has worked as a commentator for the BBC's televised golf coverage since 2000.

== Professional wins (10) ==
=== PGA Tour wins (2) ===
Legend
Major championships (1)
Other PGA Tour (1)

No.	Date	Tournament	Winning score	Margin of victory	Runner-up
1	11 Jun 1989	Manufacturers Hanover Westchester Classic	−7 (69-65-71-72=277)	Playoff	(United States) Ronnie Black
2	12 Aug 1990	PGA Championship	−6 (72-67-72-71=282)	3 strokes	(United States) Fred Couples

PGA Tour playoff record (1–1)

No.	Year	Tournament	Opponent(s)	Result
1	1989	Manufacturers Hanover Westchester Classic	(United States) Ronnie Black	Won with birdie on first extra hole
2	1989	The Open Championship	(United States) Mark Calcavecchia, (Australia) Greg Norman	Calcavecchia won four-hole aggregate playoff; Calcavecchia: −2 (4-3-3-3=13), Grady: +1 (4-4-4-4=16), Norman: x (3-3-4-x=x)

=== European Tour wins (2) ===
Legend
Major championships (1)
Other European Tour (1)

No.	Date	Tournament	Winning score	Margin of victory	Runner-up
1	26 Aug 1984	Lufthansa German Open	−16 (70-65-69-64=268)	1 stroke	(Canada) Jerry Anderson
2	12 Aug 1990	PGA Championship	−6 (72-67-72-71=282)	3 strokes	(United States) Fred Couples

European Tour playoff record (0–1)

No.	Year	Tournament	Opponents	Result
1	1989	The Open Championship	(United States) Mark Calcavecchia, (Australia) Greg Norman	Calcavecchia won four-hole aggregate playoff; Calcavecchia: −2 (4-3-3-3=13), Grady: +1 (4-4-4-4=16), Norman: x (3-3-4-x=x)

=== PGA Tour of Australasia wins (3) ===
No.	Date	Tournament	Winning score	Margin of victory	Runner-up
1	29 Oct 1978	CBA West Lakes Classic	−4 (68-72-67-73=280)	2 strokes	(Australia) Bob Shearer
2	6 Nov 1988	Australian PGA Championship (Note: incorporating the New South Wales PGA Championship.)	−13 (69-69-71-66=275)	Playoff	(Australia) Greg Norman
3	24 Nov 1991	Ford Australian PGA Championship (2)	−13 (66-66-68-69=271)	3 strokes	(Australia) Brett Ogle

PGA Tour of Australasia playoff record (1–3)

No.	Year	Tournament	Opponent	Result
1	1982	Dunhill Queensland Open	(Australia) Graham Marsh	Lost to par on first extra hole
2	1982	Air New Zealand Shell Open	(Australia) Terry Gale	Lost to birdie on second extra hole
3	1988	Australian PGA Championship	(Australia) Greg Norman	Won with par on fourth extra hole
4	1993	Optus Players Championship	(Australia) Robert Allenby	Lost to birdie on first extra hole

=== Other wins (2) ===
- 1989 World Cup of Golf (team, with Peter Fowler)
- 1993 Indonesia PGA Championship

=== PGA of Australia Legends Tour wins (2) ===
- 2007 Handa Australian Senior Open
- 2008 Handa Australian Senior Open

== Playoff record ==
PGA of Japan Tour playoff record (0–1)

No.	Year	Tournament	Opponents	Result
1	1985	Casio World Open	(United States) Hubert Green, (United States) Scott Hoch, (Japan) Nobumitsu Yuhara	Green won with par on second extra hole Grady and Yuhara eliminated by par on first hole

== Major championships ==
=== Wins (1) ===
Year	Championship	54 holes	Winning score	Margin	Runner-up
1990	PGA Championship	2 shot lead	−6 (72-67-72-71=282)	3 strokes	(United States) Fred Couples

=== Results timeline ===
Tournament	1979	1980	1981	1982	1983	1984	1985	1986	1987	1988	1989
Masters Tournament											
U.S. Open						CUT			T43	CUT	CUT
The Open Championship	CUT				CUT	CUT			T17	T38	T2
PGA Championship								T21		CUT	T46

Tournament	1990	1991	1992	1993	1994	1995	1996	1997	1998	1999
Masters Tournament	T27	CUT	T13	CUT	T41	T35				
U.S. Open	CUT	T63	T17	T81	CUT	CUT	T67			
The Open Championship	CUT	T26	T39	T9	T60	CUT				
PGA Championship	1	T43	CUT	CUT	T30	CUT	T65	CUT	CUT	

Tournament	2000	2001	2002	2003	2004	2005
Masters Tournament						
U.S. Open			CUT			
The Open Championship						
PGA Championship	T64					CUT

Win
Top 10
Did not play

CUT = missed the halfway cut (3rd round cut in 1983 Open Championship)
"T" indicates a tie for a place.

=== Summary ===
Tournament	Wins	2nd	3rd	Top-5	Top-10	Top-25	Events	Cuts made
Masters Tournament	0	0	0	0	0	1	6	4
U.S. Open	0	0	0	0	0	1	12	5
The Open Championship	0	1	0	1	2	3	12	7
PGA Championship	1	0	0	1	1	2	14	7
Totals	1	1	0	2	3	7	44	23

- Most consecutive cuts made – 6 (1991 U.S. Open – 1992 Open Championship)
- Longest streak of top-10s – 1 (three times)

== Team appearances ==
Amateur

- Australian Men's Interstate Teams Matches (representing Queensland): 1977

Professional

- World Cup (representing Australia): 1978, 1983, 1989
- Four Tours World Championship (representing Australasia): 1985, 1989, 1990 (winners)
- Dunhill Cup (representing Australia): 1989, 1990, 1991
- Alfred Dunhill Challenge (representing Australasia): 1995

== See also ==
- 1984 PGA Tour Qualifying School graduates
- List of men's major championships winning golfers
