= Lowest rounds of golf =

This article lists the lowest recorded rounds in golf. In professional competition, a round of 59 or less is regarded as a significant achievement. In men's major championships the lowest rounds are 62 by Branden Grace at the 2017 Open Championship, by Rickie Fowler and Xander Schauffele at the 2023 U.S. Open, by Xander Schauffele and Shane Lowry at the 2024 PGA Championship, and by Lucas Herbert, Sam Burns and Ryan Fox at the 2026 Open Championship. The lowest officially recorded round is 55 by Rhein Gibson in 2012. In women's major championships the lowest round is 60 by Ryu Hae-ran at the 2026 Evian Championship.

== Lowest rounds of golf ==
The lowest officially recorded round of golf is 55 by Rhein Gibson (12 birdies, two eagles, on a par 71) on May 12, 2012, at River Oaks Golf Club in Edmond, Oklahoma. This score is recognized by the Guinness World Records.

Three other rounds of 55 are documented, but these are commonly discounted due to the length of the course or the nature of the round. On August 27, 2020, another was added, as Alexander Hughes shot a 55 in Jenks, Oklahoma, within 100 miles of where Gibson had his best day.

Several competitive rounds of 57 have been shot in various events. Possibly the lowest documented round in competitive junior golf is 57, achieved by (among others) Bobby Wyatt in the 2010 Alabama Boys Junior Championship. Alex Ross shot a 57 in the 2019 Dogwood Invitational. Ross's round was 15-under-par for the Druid Hills Golf Club course in Atlanta, and included 13 birdies and one eagle. In February 2024, Cristóbal del Solar shot a round of 57 at the Astara Golf Championship in Colombia on the Korn Ferry Tour. It was the lowest round ever in a PGA Tour sanctioned event. He garnered the nickname "Mr. 57".

== Lowest rounds in professional competition ==
=== Official tournaments on the leading professional tours ===
| Player | Score | To par | Rnd | Finish | Year | Tour | Tournament | Ref. |
|---|---|---|---|---|---|---|---|---|
| (Japan) Ryo Ishikawa | 58 | −12 | 4/4 | 1 | 2010 | Japan Golf Tour | The Crowns | |
| (United States) Jim Furyk | 58 | −12 | 4/4 | T5 | 2016 | PGA Tour | Travelers Championship | |
| (South Korea) Kim Seong-hyeon | 58 | −12 | 4/4 | T11 | 2021 | Japan Golf Tour | Golf Partner Pro-Am Tournament | |
| (United States) Bryson DeChambeau | 58 (Note: A local rule allowing players to lift, clean and place their ball ("preferred lies") was in effect because of weather affecting the course or tournament.) | −12 | 3/3 | 1 | 2023 | LIV Golf League | LIV Golf Greenbrier | |
| (United States) Al Geiberger | 59 | −13 | 2/4 | 1 | 1977 | PGA Tour | Danny Thomas Memphis Classic | |
| (United States) Chip Beck | 59 | −13 | 3/5 | T3 | 1991 | PGA Tour | Las Vegas Invitational | |
| (United States) David Duval | 59 | −13 | 5/5 | 1 | 1999 | PGA Tour | Bob Hope Chrysler Classic | |
| (Sweden) Annika Sörenstam | 59 | −13 | 2/4 | 1 | 2001 | LPGA Tour | Standard Register PING | |
| (Japan) Masahiro Kuramoto | 59 | −12 | 1/4 | 1 | 2003 | Japan Golf Tour | Acom International | |
| (South Africa) Peter Karmis | 59 | −13 | 3/3 | 1 | 2009 | Sunshine Tour | Lombard Insurance Classic | |
| (United States) Paul Goydos | 59 | −12 | 1/4 | 2 | 2010 | PGA Tour | John Deere Classic | |
| (Australia) Stuart Appleby | 59 | −11 | 4/4 | 1 | 2010 | PGA Tour | Greenbrier Classic | |
| (United States) Jim Furyk | 59 | −12 | 2/4 | 3 | 2013 | PGA Tour | BMW Championship | |
| (Spain) Jorge Campillo | 59 | −11 | 2/3 | T2 | 2013 | European Tour, Sunshine Tour | Nelson Mandela Championship | |
| (South Africa) Colin Nel | 59 | −11 | 2/3 | T40 | 2013 | European Tour, Sunshine Tour | Nelson Mandela Championship | |
| (United States) Justin Thomas | 59 | −11 | 1/4 | 1 | 2017 | PGA Tour | Sony Open in Hawaii | |
| (Canada) Adam Hadwin | 59 | −13 | 3/4 | 2 | 2017 | PGA Tour | CareerBuilder Challenge | |
| (United States) Brandt Snedeker | 59 | −11 | 1/4 | 1 | 2018 | PGA Tour | Wyndham Championship | |
| (England) Oliver Fisher | 59 | −12 | 2/4 | T7 | 2018 | European Tour | Portugal Masters | |
| (United States) Kevin Chappell | 59 | −11 | 2/4 | T47 | 2019 | PGA Tour | A Military Tribute at The Greenbrier | |
| (United States) Scottie Scheffler | 59 | −12 | 2/4 | T4 | 2020 | PGA Tour | The Northern Trust | |
| (Japan) Yuta Ikeda | 59 | −11 | 1/4 | 7 | 2022 | Japan Golf Tour | Golf Partner Pro-Am Tournament | |
| (South Africa) Casey Jarvis | 59 | −13 | 3/4 | T2 | 2023 | Sunshine Tour | Stella Artois Players Championship | |
| (Chile) Joaquín Niemann | 59 | −12 | 1/3 | 1 | 2024 | LIV Golf League | LIV Golf Mayakoba | |
| (United States) John Catlin | 59 | −11 | 3/4 | 1 | 2024 | Asian Tour | International Series Macau | |
| (United States) Cameron Young | 59 | −11 | 3/4 | T9 | 2024 | PGA Tour | Travelers Championship | |
| (United States) Hayden Springer | 59 | −12 | 1/4 | T7 | 2024 | PGA Tour | John Deere Classic | |
| (United States) Patrick Reed | 59 | −11 | 3/4 | 1 | 2024 | Asian Tour | Link Hong Kong Open | |
| (Australia) Connor McKinney | 59 | −11 | 2/4 | T5 | 2024 | PGA Tour of Australasia | Gippsland Super 6 | |
| (United States) Jake Knapp | 59 | −12 | 1/4 | T6 | 2025 | PGA Tour | Cognizant Classic | |
| (Colombia) Sebastián Muñoz | 59 | −12 | 1/3 | 1 | 2025 | LIV Golf League | LIV Golf Indianapolis | |
| (United States) Michael Kim | 59 | −12 | 2/4 | T10 | 2026 | PGA Tour | 3M Open | |

=== Official tournaments on the second tier professional tours ===
| Player | Score | To par | Rnd | Finish | Year | Tour | Tournament | Ref. |
|---|---|---|---|---|---|---|---|---|
| (Chile) Cristóbal del Solar | 57 | −13 | 1/4 | 5 | 2024 | Korn Ferry Tour | Astara Golf Championship | |
| (Germany) Stephan Jäger | 58 | −12 | 1/4 | 1 | 2016 | Web.com Tour | Ellie Mae Classic | |
| (Spain) Alejandro del Rey | 58 | −14 | 2/4 | T10 | 2021 | Challenge Tour | Swiss Challenge | |
| (United States) Frankie Capan III | 58 | −13 | 1/4 | 4 | 2024 | Korn Ferry Tour | Veritex Bank Championship | |
| (United States) Doug Dunakey | 59 | −11 | 2/4 | T2 | 1998 | Nike Tour | Miami Valley Open | |
| (United States) Notah Begay III | 59 | −13 | 2/4 | T6 | 1998 | Nike Tour | Nike Dominion Open | |
| (United States) Jason Gore | 59 | −12 | 2/4 | 1 | 2005 | Nationwide Tour | Cox Classic | |
| (Australia) Brad McIntosh | 59 | −12 | 2/4 | T12 | 2005 | Von Nida Tour | Greater Building Society QLD PGA Championship | |
| (France) Adrien Mörk | 59 | −12 | 2/4 | 1 | 2006 | Challenge Tour | Tikida Hotels Agadir Moroccan Classic | |
| (United States) Will Wilcox | 59 | −12 | 4/4 | T3 | 2013 | Web.com Tour | Utah Championship | |
| (Scotland) Russell Knox | 59 | −12 | 2/4 | T12 | 2013 | Web.com Tour | Albertsons Boise Open | |
| (Italy) Nicolò Ravano | 59 | −12 | 2/3 | 2 | 2016 | Challenge Tour | Fred Olsen Challenge de España | |
| (Thailand) Sutijet Kooratanapisan | 59 | −11 | 4/4 | 3 | 2017 | Asian Development Tour, All Thailand Golf Tour | Singha Phuket Open | |
| (United States) Sam Saunders | 59 | −12 | 1/4 | T2 | 2017 | Web.com Tour | Web.com Tour Championship | |
| (Japan) Kaigo Tamaki | 59 | −11 | 1/3 | T5 | 2022 | Japan Challenge Tour | Delight Works JGTO Final | |
| (United States) Mac Meissner | 59 | −12 | 2/4 | T16 | 2023 | Korn Ferry Tour | LECOM Suncoast Classic | |
| (United States) Michael Feagles | 59 | −12 | 1/4 | T15 | 2023 | Korn Ferry Tour | BMW Charity Pro-Am | |
| (Finland) Lauri Ruuska | 59 | −12 | 1/4 | 1 | 2023 | Challenge Tour | Vierumäki Finnish Challenge | |
| (United States) David Kocher | 59 | −12 | 4/4 | 2 | 2023 | Korn Ferry Tour | Albertsons Boise Open | |
| (South Africa) Aldrich Potgieter | 59 | −11 | 2/4 | T20 | 2024 | Korn Ferry Tour | Astara Golf Championship | |
| (Japan) Suguru Shimoke | 59 | −11 | 3/3 | 1 | 2024 | Japan Challenge Tour | PGM Challenge | |
| (Belgium) Adrien Dumont de Chassart | 59 | −11 | 1/4 | T5 | 2025 | Korn Ferry Tour | Blue Cross and Blue Shield of Kansas Wichita Open | |
| (Canada) Myles Creighton | 59 | −11 | 3/4 | 1 | 2025 | Korn Ferry Tour | Blue Cross and Blue Shield of Kansas Wichita Open | |
| (United States) Davis Chatfield | 59 | −12 | 1/4 | T15 | 2025 | Korn Ferry Tour | Compliance Solutions Championship | |
| (Netherlands) Lars van der Vight | 59 | −13 | 2/4 | 1 | 2026 | Challenge Tour | German Challenge | |
| (United States) Frankie Harris | 59 | −12 | 4/4 | 1 | 2026 | Korn Ferry Tour | Pinnacle Bank Championship | |

=== Official tournaments on the leading senior tours ===
| Player | Score | To par | Rnd | Finish | Year | Tour | Tournament | Ref. |
|---|---|---|---|---|---|---|---|---|
| (United States) Kevin Sutherland | 59 | −13 | 2/3 | T7 | 2014 | Champions Tour | Dick's Sporting Goods Open | |
| (Spain) Miguel Ángel Martín | 59 | −9 | 2/3 | T4 | 2018 | European Senior Tour | MCB Tour Championship (Seychelles) | |

=== Other tournaments ===
| Player | Score | To par | Rnd | Finish | Year | Tour | Tournament | Ref. |
|---|---|---|---|---|---|---|---|---|
| (Republic of Ireland) David Carey | 57 | −11 | 1/3 | 1 | 2019 | Alps Tour | Cervino Open | |
| (Canada) Steve Anderson-Chapman | 58 | −11 | 2/2 | 3 | 1984 | n/a | West Country Open | |
| (Japan) Shigeki Maruyama | 58 | −13 | 1/2 | n/a | 2000 | n/a | U.S. Open qualifying round | |
| (United States) Jason Bohn | 58 | −13 | 4/4 | 1 | 2001 | Canadian Tour | Bayer Championship | |
| (United States) John Hahn | 58 | −12 | 4/6 | T50 | 2014 | European Tour | European Tour Qualifying School | |
| (United States) Sam Snead | 59 | −11 | 3/4 | 1 | 1959 | n/a | Sam Snead Festival | |
| (South Africa) Gary Player | 59 | −10 | 2/4 | 1 | 1974 | n/a | Brazil Open | |
| (Japan) Tsutomu Irie | 59 | −11 | 1/2 | 1 | 1985 | Japan Golf Tour | Kuzuha International | |
| (Australia) Zoran Zorkic | 59 | −12 | 4/4 | 3 | 1990 | U.S. Golf Tour | Turtle Classic | |
| (South Africa) Sean Pappas | 59 | −12 | 1/4 | 1 | 1991 | T. C. Jordan Tour | Hartland Classic | |
| (United States) David Gossett | 59 | −13 | 4/6 | T68 | 2000 | PGA Tour | Qualifying school tournament | |
| (United States) Phil Mickelson | 59 | −13 | 2/2 | 1 | 2004 | PGA Tour | PGA Grand Slam of Golf | |
| (Germany) Martin Kaymer | 59 | −13 | 2/3 | 1 | 2006 | EPD Tour | Habsberg Classic | |
| (United States) Steve Marino | 59 | −13 | 3/4 | 1 | 2006 | Gateway Tour | Sidney Frank Memorial Tour Championship | |
| (United States) Harrison Frazar | 59 | −13 | 4/6 | 1 | 2008 | PGA Tour | Qualifying school tournament | |
| (New Zealand) Richard Lee | 59 | −11 | 2/4 | T25 | 2010 | Charles Tour | Carrus Tauranga Open | |
| (United States) Chris Erwin | 59 | −13 | 2/4 | T25 | 2010 | NGA Hooters Tour | ADI Classic | |
| (India) Ashok Kumar | 59 | −10 | 1/4 | 1 | 2010 | Professional Golf Tour of India | Tata Open | |
| (Sweden) Jens Dantorp | 59 | −12 | 2/3 | 1 | 2011 | Nordic Golf League | Bravo Tours Open | |
| (United States) Jesse Smith | 59 | −11 | 1/2 | 2 | 2013 | Fore The Players Tour | Orlando Open | |
| (New Zealand) Mark Brown | 59 | −11 | 2/4 | 1 | 2014 | Charles Tour | Carrus Open | |
| (United States) Will McCurdy | 59 | −13 | 2/3 | 1 | 2015 | SwingThought.com Tour | Callaway Gardens 3 Day | |
| (Netherlands) Robin Kind | 59 | −13 | 2/3 | 1 | 2015 | Pro Golf Tour | Sparkassen Open | |
| (Canada) James Love | 59 | −12 | 1/4 | n/a | 2016 | Web.com Tour | Qualifying school tournament | |
| (United States) Woody Austin | 59 | −12 | 1/3 | 1 | 2017 | PGA Tour Champions | Diamond Resorts Invitational | |
| (Germany) Hinrich Arkenau | 59 | −13 | 1/3 | 1 | 2017 | Pro Golf Tour | Sparkassen Open | |
| (Sweden) Jacob Glennemo | 59 | −10 | 2/3 | T8 | 2017 | Nordic Golf League | Race to HimmerLand | |
| (New Zealand) Mark Brown | 59 | −11 | 2/4 | T2 | 2018 | Charles Tour | Carrus Open | |
| (Canada) Drew Nesbitt | 59 | −12 | 2/4 | T49 | 2018 | PGA Tour Latinoamérica | JHSF Aberto do Brasil | |
| (United States) Greyson Sigg | 59 | −12 | 4/4 | 3 | 2019 | PGA Tour Canada | GolfBC Championship | |
| (England) Harry Ellis | 59 | −12 | 2/3 | 1 | 2020 | n/a | Memorial Olivier Barras | |
| (United States) Chris Gilman | 59 | −13 | 3/3 | 1 | 2020 | Dakotas Tour | South Dakota Open Pro-Am | |
| (United States) Luke Schniederjans | 59 | −11 | 2/3 | 2 | 2020 | GPro Tour | Mimosa Challenge | |
| (England) Jack South | 59 | −11 | 3/3 | 1 | 2021 | PGA EuroPro Tour | Motocaddy Masters | |
| (Thailand) Phachara Khongwatmai | 59 | −11 | 1/4 | 1 | 2021 | All Thailand Golf Tour | Singha Pattaya Open | |
| (Italy) Gregorio De Leo | 59 | −11 | 3/3 | 1 | 2022 | Alps Tour | Memorial Giorgio Bordoni | |
| (Chile) Matías Domínguez | 59 | −12 | 2/2 | n/a | 2024 | Professional Golf Tour of India | Qualifying school tournament | |
| (Australia) Peter Lonard | 59 | −11 | 2/2 | 1 | 2024 | PGA of Australia Legends Tour | Moama Masters | |
| (New Zealand) Harry Hillier | 59 | −13 | 2/4 | 1 | 2024 | PGA Tour Americas | Inter Rapidisimo Golf Championship | |
| (Netherlands) Vince van Veen | 59 | −12 | 3/6 | T43 | 2024 | European Tour | European Tour Qualifying School | |
| (United States) Philip Barbaree Jr. | 59 | −13 | 3/4 | T10 | 2025 | PGA Tour Americas | Commissionaires Ottawa Open | |
| (United States) Brett White | 59 | −13 | 4/4 | 1 | 2025 | PGA Tour Americas | Commissionaires Ottawa Open | |
| (United States) Jhared Hack | 59 | −10 | 4/4 | 1 | 2026 | Professional Golf Tour of India | SECL Chhatisgarh Open Golf Championship | |
| (England) Haydn McCullen | 59 | −12 | 1/2 | 1 | 2026 | PGA Scotland Open Series | Northern Open | |
| (United States) Scott Stevens | 59 | −11 | 1/4 | T52 | 2026 | PGA Tour Americas | Osprey Valley Open | |
| (Argentina) Miguel Ángel Carballo | 59 | −13 | 2/2 | 2 | 2026 | TPG Tour | Buenos Aires Classic | |

Notes:

- Rnd is the round in which the score was shot, i.e. 2/4 means the round was shot in the second of four rounds.
- Finish is the final tournament finish of the player

== Lowest rounds in men's major championships ==
In men's major championships the lowest round is 62 which was first recorded by South African golfer Branden Grace in the third round of the 2017 Open Championship. In the first round of the 2024 PGA Championship, Xander Schauffele became the first golfer to record a round of 62 in a major championship twice.

| # | Player | Major | Date | Course | Rnd | To par | Finish |
|---|---|---|---|---|---|---|---|
| 1 | (South Africa) Branden Grace | The Open Championship | Jul 22, 2017 | Royal Birkdale Golf Club | 3 | −8 | T6 |
| 2 | (United States) Rickie Fowler | U.S. Open | Jun 15, 2023 | Los Angeles Country Club | 1 | −8 | T5 |
| 3 | (United States) Xander Schauffele | U.S. Open | Jun 15, 2023 | Los Angeles Country Club (2) | 1 | −8 | T10 |
| 4 | (United States) Xander Schauffele (2) | PGA Championship | May 16, 2024 | Valhalla Golf Club | 1 | −9 | 1 |
| 5 | (Republic of Ireland) Shane Lowry | PGA Championship | May 18, 2024 | Valhalla Golf Club (2) | 3 | −9 | T6 |
| 6 | (Australia) Lucas Herbert | The Open Championship | Jul 17, 2026 | Royal Birkdale Golf Club (2) | 2 | −8 | T6 |
| 7 | (United States) Sam Burns | The Open Championship | Jul 17, 2026 | Royal Birkdale Golf Club (3) | 2 | −8 | 3 |
| 8 | (New Zealand) Ryan Fox | The Open Championship | Jul 18, 2026 | Royal Birkdale Golf Club (4) | 3 | −8 | 1 |

Many players have recorded a score of 63. Johnny Miller was the first golfer to shoot 63 in a major and was the only golfer to shoot 63 in the final round to win a major until Henrik Stenson did so as well during the 2016 Open Championship at Royal Troon Golf Club. Greg Norman, Vijay Singh, Brooks Koepka and Tommy Fleetwood are the only golfers to record two rounds of 63 in the majors.

| # | Player | Major | Date | Course | Rnd | To par | Finish |
|---|---|---|---|---|---|---|---|
| 1 | (United States) Johnny Miller | U.S. Open | Jun 17, 1973 | Oakmont Country Club | 4 | −8 | 1 |
| 2 | (Australia) Bruce Crampton | PGA Championship | Aug 8, 1975 | Firestone Country Club | 2 | −7 | 2 |
| 3 | (United States) Mark Hayes | The Open Championship | Jul 7, 1977 | Turnberry | 2 | −7 | T9 |
| 4 | (United States) Tom Weiskopf | U.S. Open | Jun 12, 1980 | Baltusrol Golf Club | 1 | −7 | 37 |
| 5 | (United States) Jack Nicklaus | U.S. Open | Jun 12, 1980 | Baltusrol Golf Club (2) | 1 | −7 | 1 |
| 6 | (Japan) Isao Aoki | The Open Championship | Jul 19, 1980 | Muirfield | 3 | −8 | T12 |
| 7 | (United States) Raymond Floyd | PGA Championship | Aug 5, 1982 | Southern Hills Country Club | 1 | −7 | 1 |
| 8 | (South Africa) Gary Player | PGA Championship | Aug 17, 1984 | Shoal Creek Golf and Country Club | 2 | −9 | T2 |
| 9 | (Zimbabwe) Nick Price | Masters Tournament | Apr 12, 1986 | Augusta National Golf Club | 3 | −9 | 5 |
| 10 | (Australia) Greg Norman | The Open Championship | Jul 18, 1986 | Turnberry (2) | 2 | −7 | 1 |
| 11 | (England) Paul Broadhurst | The Open Championship | Jul 21, 1990 | Old Course at St Andrews | 3 | −9 | T12 |
| 12 | (United States) Jodie Mudd | The Open Championship | Jul 21, 1991 | Royal Birkdale Golf Club | 4 | −7 | T5 |
| 13 | (England) Nick Faldo | The Open Championship | Jul 16, 1993 | Royal St George's Golf Club | 2 | −7 | 2 |
| 14 | (United States) Payne Stewart | The Open Championship | Jul 18, 1993 | Royal St George's Golf Club (2) | 4 | −7 | 12 |
| 15 | (Fiji) Vijay Singh | PGA Championship | Aug 13, 1993 | Inverness Club | 2 | −8 | 4 |
| 16 | (United States) Michael Bradley | PGA Championship | Aug 10, 1995 | Riviera Country Club | 1 | −8 | T54 |
| 17 | (United States) Brad Faxon | PGA Championship | Aug 13, 1995 | Riviera Country Club (2) | 4 | −8 | 5 |
| 18 | (Australia) Greg Norman (2) | Masters Tournament | Apr 11, 1996 | Augusta National Golf Club (2) | 1 | −9 | 2 |
| 19 | (Spain) José María Olazábal | PGA Championship | Aug 19, 2000 | Valhalla Golf Club | 3 | −9 | T4 |
| 20 | (United States) Mark O'Meara | PGA Championship | Aug 17, 2001 | Atlanta Athletic Club | 2 | −7 | T22 |
| 21 | (Fiji) Vijay Singh (2) | U.S. Open | Jun 13, 2003 | Olympia Fields Country Club | 2 | −7 | T20 |
| 22 | (Denmark) Thomas Bjørn | PGA Championship | Aug 13, 2005 | Baltusrol Golf Club (3) | 3 | −7 | T2 |
| 23 | (United States) Tiger Woods | PGA Championship | Aug 10, 2007 | Southern Hills Country Club (2) | 2 | −7 | 1 |
| 24 | (Northern Ireland) Rory McIlroy | The Open Championship | Jul 15, 2010 | Old Course at St Andrews (2) | 1 | −9 | T3 |
| 25 | (United States) Steve Stricker | PGA Championship | Aug 11, 2011 | Atlanta Athletic Club (2) | 1 | −7 | T12 |
| 26 | (United States) Jason Dufner | PGA Championship | Aug 9, 2013 | Oak Hill Country Club | 2 | −7 | 1 |
| 27 | (Japan) Hiroshi Iwata | PGA Championship | Aug 14, 2015 | Whistling Straits | 2 | −9 | T21 |
| 28 | (United States) Phil Mickelson | The Open Championship | Jul 14, 2016 | Royal Troon Golf Club | 1 | −8 | 2 |
| 29 | (Sweden) Henrik Stenson | The Open Championship | Jul 17, 2016 | Royal Troon Golf Club (2) | 4 | −8 | 1 |
| 30 | (United States) Robert Streb | PGA Championship | Jul 29, 2016 | Baltusrol Golf Club (4) | 2 | −7 | T7 |
| 31 | (United States) Justin Thomas | U.S. Open | Jun 17, 2017 | Erin Hills | 3 | −9 | T9 |
| 32 | (China) Li Haotong | The Open Championship | Jul 23, 2017 | Royal Birkdale Golf Club (2) | 4 | −7 | 3 |
| 33 | (England) Tommy Fleetwood | U.S. Open | Jun 17, 2018 | Shinnecock Hills Golf Club | 4 | −7 | 2 |
| 34 | (United States) Brooks Koepka | PGA Championship | Aug 10, 2018 | Bellerive Country Club | 2 | −7 | 1 |
| 35 | (South Africa) Charl Schwartzel | PGA Championship | Aug 10, 2018 | Bellerive Country Club (2) | 2 | −7 | T42 |
| 36 | (United States) Brooks Koepka (2) | PGA Championship | May 16, 2019 | Bethpage Black Course | 1 | −7 | 1 |
| 37 | (Republic of Ireland) Shane Lowry | The Open Championship | Jul 20, 2019 | Royal Portrush Golf Club | 3 | −8 | 1 |
| 38 | (United States) Bubba Watson | PGA Championship | May 20, 2022 | Southern Hills Country Club | 2 | −7 | T30 |
| 39 | (England) Tommy Fleetwood (2) | U.S. Open | Jun 18, 2023 | Los Angeles Country Club | 4 | −7 | T5 |
| 40 | (Spain) Jon Rahm | The Open Championship | July 22, 2023 | Royal Liverpool Golf Club | 3 | −8 | T2 |

== Lowest rounds in women's professional competition ==
=== Official tournaments on major tours ===
There have been 3 rounds of 58 recorded on the Ladies European Tour, all in the Bloor Homes Eastleigh Classic. These rounds were achieved by Trish Johnson (1990), Jane Connachan (1991) and Dale Reid (1991). This tournament was played on a par 65 public golf course. The lowest Ladies European Tour round on a course with par of minimum 70 has been 61.

| Player | Score | To par | Rnd | Finish | Year | Tour | Tournament | Ref. |
|---|---|---|---|---|---|---|---|---|
| (Sweden) Annika Sorenstam | 59 | −13 | 2/4 | 1 | 2001 | LPGA | Standard Register PING | |
| (South Korea) Ye Sung Jun | 60 | −12 | 4/4 | 2 | 2024 | KLPGA | Creas F&C KLPGA Championship | |
| (United States) Meg Mallon | 60 | −10 | 2/4 | 6 | 2003 | LPGA | Welch's/Fry's Championship | |
| (South Korea) Sarah Lee | 60 | −10 | 2/4 | T2 | 2004 | LPGA | Welch's/Fry's Championship | |
| (United States) Anna Acker-Macosko | 60 | −11 | 4/4 | T5 | 2004 | LPGA | Longs Drugs Challenge | |
| (United States) Paula Creamer | 60 | −10 | 1/4 | 1 | 2008 | LPGA | Jamie Farr Owens Corning Classic | |
| (United States) Jessica Korda | 60 | −11 | 3/4 | 1 | 2021 | LPGA | Diamond Resorts Tournament of Champions | |
| (Sweden) Linnea Ström | 60 | −11 | 3/3 | 1 | 2024 | LPGA | ShopRite LPGA Classic | |

== Lowest rounds in women's major championships ==
In women's major championships the lowest round is 60 by Ryu Hae-ran.

| # | Player | Major | Date | Course | Rnd | To par | Finish |
|---|---|---|---|---|---|---|---|
| 1 | (South Korea) Ryu Hae-ran | The Evian Championship | Jul 11, 2026 | Evian Resort Golf Club | 3 | −11 | 1 |

== Perfect round ==
A perfect round is a round of eighteen holes where all holes were played on average at one under par (average of birdie on every hole) resulting in a score of 55 on a par 73 course, 54 on a par 72 course, 53 on a par 71 course, and 52 on a par 70 course.

There is a philosophy popularized by Pia Nilsson's Vision 54 that concentrates on achieving the perfect round, the basic ideology being that striving for perfection results in better scores even if the goal is not met. Cecilia Ekelundh, who formerly played on the Ladies European Tour, did keep the perfect round on her mind by drawing a 54 on the ball she played in competition.
