= Taranaki Open =

Golf tournament

Tournament information
- Location: New Plymouth, Taranaki, New Zealand
- Established: 2006
- Courses: New Plymouth Golf Club (Ngamotu Links)
- Par: 72
- Tours: Charles Tour; Golf Tour of New Zealand
- Format: Stroke play
- Prize fund: NZ$60,000
- Month played: October

Tournament record score
- Aggregate: 266 Fraser Wilkin (2013)
- To par: −22 as above

Current champion
- (New Zealand) Dominic Barson

Location map
- Location in New Zealand

The Taranaki Open is an annual 72-hole golf tournament staged on the New Plymouth Golf Club's Ngamotu Links in New Plymouth, New Zealand. Between 2004 and 2007 it was an event on the Golf Tour of New Zealand while events since 2008 have been part of the Charles Tour. Prior to 2004 the tournament was run over two days, with 36 holes on each day.

== Winners ==
Year	Tour (Note: CHAR − Charles Tour; GTNZ − Golf Tour of New Zealand.)	Winner	Score	To par	Margin of victory	Runner(s)-up	Ref.
Unlimit Taranaki Open
2026	CHAR	(New Zealand) Dominic Barson (2)	281	−7	Playoff	(New Zealand) Cameron Harlock	
TSB Taranaki Open
2025	CHAR	(New Zealand) Josh Geary (2)	282	−6	2 strokes	(New Zealand) Mitchell Kale	
2024	CHAR	(New Zealand) Mark Brown (2)	282	−6	Playoff	(New Zealand) Josh Geary	
2023	CHAR	(New Zealand) Josh Geary	272	−16	6 strokes	(New Zealand) Mark Brown (New Zealand) Tyler Hodge	
Taranaki Open
2022	CHAR	(New Zealand) Michael Hendry (2)	272	−16	3 strokes	(New Zealand) Josh Geary	
2021	CHAR	Cancelled					
2020	CHAR	(New Zealand) Kieran Muir	202 (Note: Shortened to 54 holes due to weather.)	−14	4 strokes	(New Zealand) Josh Geary (New Zealand) Michael Hendry (New Zealand) Daniel Hillier (New Zealand) Momoka Kobori (a) (New Zealand) Lachie McDonald	
2018–19: No tournament
Augusta Funds Management Ngamotu Classic
2017	CHAR	(New Zealand) Daniel Pearce	277	−11	1 stroke	(New Zealand) Mark Brown (New Zealand) Jared Pender	
Augusta Funds Management Taranaki Open
2016	CHAR	(New Zealand) Dominic Barson	270	−18	4 strokes	(New Zealand) Shaun Jones	
2015	CHAR	(New Zealand) Joonsang Chung	279	−9	2 strokes	(New Zealand) Woonchul Na	
Taranaki Energy Open
2014: No tournament
2013	CHAR	(New Zealand) Fraser Wilkin	266	−22	1 stroke	(New Zealand) Brad Hayward (a)	
2012	CHAR	(Germany) David Klein	274	−14	Playoff	(New Zealand) Ryan Fox	
Port Taranaki Open
2011	CHAR	(New Zealand) Joshua Carmichael	278	−10	1 stroke	(New Zealand) Hamish Robertson	
2010	CHAR	(New Zealand) Troy Ropiha (2)	209	−7	2 strokes	(New Zealand) Mathew Perry	
2009	CHAR	(New Zealand) Michael Hendry	280	−8	2 strokes	(New Zealand) Doug Holloway	
Bayleys Taranaki Open
2008	CHAR	(New Zealand) Troy Ropiha (a)	278	−10	5 strokes	(New Zealand) Andrew Searle	
2007	GTNZ	(New Zealand) Bradley Iles	213	−3	4 strokes	(New Zealand) Mark Brown	
Olex Taranaki Open
2006	GTNZ	(New Zealand) Mark Brown	274	−14	3 strokes	(New Zealand) Mathew Holten	
2005	GTNZ	(New Zealand) Doug Holloway (a)	278	−10	3 strokes	(New Zealand) Guy Penrose (New Zealand) Brad Shilton	
2004	GTNZ	(New Zealand) Ryan Haywood	285	−3	1 stroke	(New Zealand) Mark Brown	
