= Ryan Fox =

New Zealand professional golfer (born 1987)

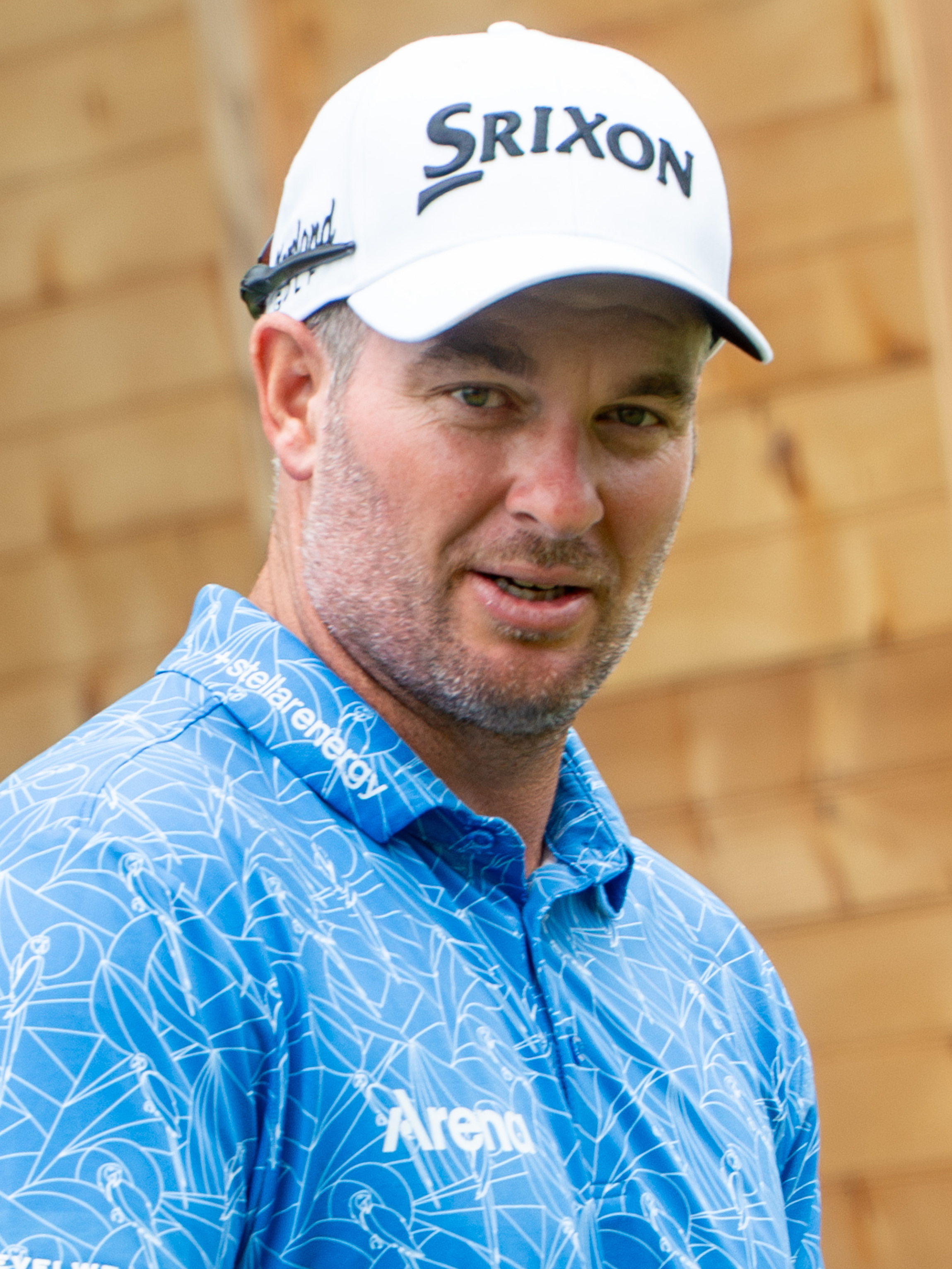
- Fox in 2025

Personal information
- Nickname: Foxy
- Nationality: New Zealand
- Born: 22 January 1987 (age 39) Auckland, New Zealand
- Height: 1.83 m (6 ft 0 in)
- Weight: 100 kg (220 lb)
- Spouse: Anneke Ryff (m. 2019)
- Children: 2

Career
- Sport: Golf
- Turned professional: 2012
- Current tours: PGA Tour; European Tour
- Former tours: PGA Tour of Australasia; Challenge Tour; OneAsia Tour
- Professional wins: 20
- Highest ranking: 22 (19 July 2026) (as of 8 November 2026)

Number of wins by tour
- PGA Tour: 3
- European Tour: 5
- Asian Tour: 1
- PGA Tour of Australasia: 3
- Challenge Tour: 2
- Other: 9

Best results in major championships (wins: 1)
- Masters Tournament: T26: 2023
- PGA Championship: T23: 2023
- U.S. Open: T19: 2025
- The Open Championship: Won: 2026

Achievements and awards
- PGA Tour of Australasia Order of Merit winner: 2019
- PGA Tour of Australasia Player of the Year: 2019
- Charles Tour Order of Merit winner: 2021
- European Tour Player of the Year: 2022

Ryan Fox (born 22 January 1987) is a New Zealand professional golfer who plays on the European Tour and the PGA Tour. He has won one major championship, the 2026 Open Championship.

Fox had a late start to golf and turned professional in 2012. After playing on the PGA Tour of Australasia and Challenge Tour, he had his rookie season on the European Tour in 2017. Fox won the Seve Ballesteros Award in 2022 as the European Tour's player of the year and attained membership on the PGA Tour in 2023. He won twice on the PGA Tour in 2025 and claimed his first major at the 2026 Open Championship.

== Early life and amateur career ==
Fox was born on 22 January 1987 in Auckland, New Zealand, to Adele (née Wallace) and Grant Fox. He has one sibling, a younger sister named Kendall. Grant was a rugby union player who won the 1987 Rugby World Cup with the All Blacks, and Adele's father Merv Wallace was an international cricketer. Fox wears orthotics due to having flat feet and bowed legs. He said in 2022: "Unfortunately genetics didn't help me in that regard." When Fox was a teenager, the family moved to Beachlands in the east of Auckland, nearby to Whitford Park Golf Club.

Fox attended Saint Kentigern College until he moved to King's College, where he played First XV rugby. He also played premier cricket in school. Growing up he was known as "Grant Fox's son" and was targeted while playing rugby, often receiving rough tackles. Fox quit rugby and cricket after school. He had started playing golf at age 13 and was a two handicap by age 16, but did not play his first competitive tournament until he had graduated from school. He recalled in 2017: "I was completely hooked then. ... As a kid the only thing I ever wanted to do was play sport. I didn't know what sport it was. Mum and Dad were really proud and happy to support me in whatever I wanted to do and in the end that happened to be golf."

Although he wanted to attempt to become a professional golfer, Fox's parents encouraged him to attend the University of Auckland so he would "have something to fall back on". He started out as a law student, but switched to a Bachelor of Arts degree majoring in psychology. He stated in 2015 that he had disliked law and said he "sort of fell into" psychology. Fox transitioned from full-time to part-time studies as he gained momentum in golf. He played in the New Zealand Open as an amateur in 2006, where he shot rounds of 82–77 to miss the cut. Fox won the Auckland stroke play in 2008, and reached the semi-final of the Australian Amateur in 2009.

Fox won the Grant Clements Memorial in 2010. He travelled to the United States to compete in amateur events in 2010, such as the Southern Amateur. Fox's father caddied for him and recalled in 2018: "He got his backside kicked, and to his credit he said, 'Well, now I see the level I've got to get to.' ... He's always had a real mental resilience about him." Fox was selected to represent New Zealand at the 2010 Eisenhower Trophy in October, where he helped the team to a fourth-place finish. This was the country's best result in the competition since their victory in 1992. Fox finished runner-up at the Australian Master of the Amateurs in January 2011. After defending his title at the Grant Clements Memorial in February, he said he would not attempt to win a third consecutive title in 2012 as he planned to turn professional.

In April 2011, Fox won the North Island Stroke Play, shooting 17-under 267 to win by a tournament-record margin of 11 strokes. Later that month, he recorded a five-shot victory at the New Zealand Stroke Play. Fox finished runner-up at the Carrus Open, a professional tournament on the Charles Tour, in September 2011. He ended 2011 with a seventh-place finish at the final stage of qualifying school for the PGA Tour of Australasia. By finishing inside the top 10, he earned full status for the 2012 PGA Tour of Australasia season. Fox was the only amateur to progress through the tour's qualifying school that year.

== Professional career ==
=== Early years ===
Fox turned professional in 2012 and won his first tournament in the paid ranks at the Martinborough Pro-Am in January. He shot 7-under 65 in the one-round event to finish three strokes ahead of five runners-up including Gareth Paddison. Fox received NZ$1,800 for this win. He won the Fiji Open in June 2012, earning $4,000. Fox added another victory at the Tahiti Open in July, finishing one stroke ahead of Terry Pilkadaris. At the 2012 PGA Tour Qualifying Tournament in October, Fox shot 3-under 285 at first stage and failed to advance to second stage. In December, Fox finished tied-fourth at the NSW PGA Championship. This result moved him inside the top 10 of the PGA Tour of Australasia order of merit, with A$47,081 in earnings for the season.

In 2013, Fox struggled and considered ending his golf career. He missed numerous cuts and was on the verge of losing his playing status on the PGA Tour of Australasia. With two events remaining on the 2013 PGA Tour of Australasia schedule, he finished fifth at the Australian Masters and earned enough money to retain his tour card. Fox credited a conversation he had with his father prior to the event for the turnaround, recalling in 2017:

Travel was getting to me, I wasn't playing very well, I missed a lot of cuts and looking like I was missing my card for the next year. At that point I was pretty happy if that happened. I was going to find another career. I had a big chat to Dad about it and we had two events left in the year and he said 'all we're going to do is go out and have fun'. ... That seemed to work and I finished fifth the next week and made enough money to keep my tour card for the following year.

In February 2014, Fox finished runner-up at the Queensland PGA Championship. This moved him to 468th in the Official World Golf Ranking. Fox recorded his first PGA Tour of Australasia victory in October 2014, at the Western Australia Open. He shot a tournament-record score of 23-under to win by six strokes, earning $16,500 for the win. The following week, Fox finished tied-ninth at the ISPS Handa Perth International, a tournament co-sanctioned by the European Tour. He added a seventh-place finish at the Australian Open in November.

Fox won the Queensland PGA Championship in February 2015. He shot a final-round 62, including two eagles in his final three holes, to finish one stroke ahead of Matthew Millar and Cameron Smith. Fox made his first major championship appearance at the 2015 Open Championship, held at the Old Course at St Andrews, after advancing through qualifying to earn a spot in the field. He made the cut and shot a 5-under 67 in the final round to finish in a tie for 49th. The following week, Fox opened with a 62 and led wire-to-wire at the Le Vaudreuil Golf Challenge, which was his first victory on the Challenge Tour, a development tour beneath the European Tour. He received €32,000 for the win and earned full status on the Challenge Tour.

At the Northern Ireland Open in July 2016, Fox shot a 9-under 62 in the final round to win his second Challenge Tour title. Fox qualified to represent New Zealand at the 2016 Summer Olympics, where he finished in a tie for 39th. Fox ended the 2016 Challenge Tour season at fourth in the rankings and secured promotion to the European Tour.

=== European Tour ===
Fox finished tied-fourth at the Scottish Open In July 2017, which was his third consecutive top-10 on the European Tour. The result moved him to 95th in the Official World Golf Ranking, marking the first time he had been inside the top 100. At the 2017 PGA Championship in August, Fox shot a first-round 75 but rallied with a 66 in the second round to make the cut. Entering the final round in 12th place, he carded a 78 to tumble outside the top 50. At the 2018 Irish Open, Fox shot 14-under to tie for first alongside Russell Knox. Fox lost to birdie on the first playoff hole. The runner-up finish secured Fox a new career-high payout of €665,614 (NZ$1.5 million).

In February 2019, Fox recorded his first victory on the European Tour at the ISPS Handa World Super 6 Perth. He defeated Jazz Janewattananond, Kristoffer Reitan and Paul Dunne en route to the final, where he beat Adrian Otaegui to claim the title and $184,000 first-place prize. He was the first golfer from New Zealand to win on the European Tour since Danny Lee in 2009. In the first round of the 2019 Open Championship held at Royal Portrush Golf Club, Fox shot a 29 on the back nine, which was the first sub-30 back nine in Open Championship history. He totalled 68 for the round and sat in third-place. Fox finished the tournament in a tie for 16th place, which was a new career-high finish for him in a major championship.

Fox shot a final-round 64 to finish runner-up at the ISPS Handa Vic Open in February 2020, two strokes behind Min Woo Lee. This was Fox's first top-10 finish since his win at the ISPS Handa World Super 6 Perth. Fox shot back-to-back 65s to lead the Saudi International after 36 holes in February 2021. He followed with rounds of 71–68 to end the tournament in a tie for sixth, four strokes behind the winner Dustin Johnson. Fox represented New Zealand at the 2020 Summer Olympics event held at Kasumigaseki Country Club from 29 July to 1 August 2021, which was his second Olympic appearance. He shot 7-under 64 in the final round to finish tied-42nd.

At the Ras Al Khaimah Classic in February 2022, Fox opened with a 9-under 63 to take the first-round lead. He extended his lead to six shots after three rounds and closed with a 69 to win his second European Tour title. The victory moved him from 211th to 119th in the Official World Golf Ranking. Fox said afterwards: "Sleeping on a six-shot lead, I didn't sleep very well last night. ... I was a bit nervous. I had that awful feeling in the pit of my stomach all day." In May, Fox held the outright lead at the Soudal Open after 54 holes. He shot a final-round 71 to finish runner-up, one stroke behind the winner Sam Horsfield. Two weeks later, Fox made double bogey on the final hole at the Dutch Open to fall into a playoff against Victor Perez. On the fourth playoff hole, Perez holed a long birdie putt to defeat Fox. At the Horizon Irish Open in July, Fox carded a final-round 64 to finish solo-second, which was his third runner-up finish of the year.

In October 2022, Fox won the Alfred Dunhill Links Championship for his second victory of the year. For the win, he earned US$816,000. The following month, Fox finished second at the Nedbank Golf Challenge. Having started the year outside the top 200 of the Official World Golf Ranking, Fox moved to 24th by November. Fox finished second in the 2022 European Tour rankings, behind only Rory McIlroy, and received the Seve Ballesteros Award as the tour's player of the year.

By virtue of being inside the top 50 of the world rankings, Fox received an invite to make his debut at the 2023 Masters Tournament. He made the cut and finished in a tie for 26th place. In September 2023, Fox won the BMW PGA Championship, the European Tour's flagship event. He shot a final-round 67 for a one-stroke victory over Aaron Rai and Tyrrell Hatton. This was Fox's first Rolex Series win. As defending champion at the Alfred Dunhill Links Championship the following month, Fox finished tied-second, three strokes behind Matt Fitzpatrick. By finishing inside the top 10 of the 2023 European Tour rankings, Fox earned full playing status for the 2024 PGA Tour season.

=== PGA Tour ===
In April 2024, Fox partnered with Garrick Higgo to finish tied-fourth at the Zurich Classic of New Orleans, a team event on the PGA Tour. This was Fox's first top-10 finish on the tour. Fox struggled with a hip injury during 2024, specifically a labral tear and femoroacetabular impingement. He qualified to represented New Zealand at the 2024 Summer Olympics in August, which was his third straight Olympic appearance. He placed tied-35th, 17 strokes behind the gold medalist Scottie Scheffler. Fox finished 108th in the PGA Tour's seasonal rankings, which was narrowly inside the cutoff to retain playing privileges for the following year. Speaking to The New Zealand Herald in November 2024, he said of the season: "If I was going to grade myself, I'd say it would probably be a C."

Fox won his first PGA Tour event at the Oneflight Myrtle Beach Classic in May 2025. He chipped in for birdie from around 50 feet (15 m) on the first playoff hole to beat Mackenzie Hughes and Harry Higgs. One month later, Fox won the RBC Canadian Open with a birdie on the fourth playoff hole to defeat Sam Burns. Fox described his approach with a 3-wood to 7 feet (2.1 m) on the fourth playoff hole as "probably the best shot I've ever hit". The win moved him from 75th to 32nd in the Official World Golf Ranking. The following week, Fox finished tied-19th at the 2025 U.S. Open.

In the third round of the 2026 Open Championship at Royal Birkdale, Fox shot a 62 to tie the record for the lowest round in a major championship. In the final round, he birdied the 18th hole to post 10-under 270 and win the Claret Jug by one stroke over Cameron Young. This made Fox the third man from New Zealand to win a major championship, after Bob Charles and Michael Campbell. The win moved him up 34 places in the Official World Golf Ranking, from 56th to a career-high of 22nd. For the win, Fox received $3.2 million (NZ$5.4 million) and a five-year exemption on the PGA Tour.

== Personal life ==
In March 2019, Fox married Anneke Ryff on Rakino Island in the Hauraki Gulf. The couple have two daughters. While playing on the European Tour in 2018, Fox bought an apartment in Addlestone, situated outside London and nearby to Heathrow Airport. He also owned a house in Onehunga, New Zealand. After he began playing primarily on the PGA Tour, Fox and his family moved to Jupiter, Florida in 2025.

Fox was friends with Australian cricketer Shane Warne and they partnered at the Alfred Dunhill Links Championship pro-am multiple times. After winning the tournament in 2022, Fox dedicated the victory to Warne, who had died that year, stating: "It means a lot to win this event, we were great mates, and it's just a shame he's not here. I really wanted to try to do something special for Warney and I'm pretty proud to have been able to accomplish that."

== Amateur wins ==
- 2010 Grant Clements Memorial
- 2011 Grant Clements Memorial, SBS Invitational-Individual, North Island Stroke Play, New Zealand Stroke Play

== Professional wins (20) ==
=== PGA Tour wins (3) ===
Legend
Major championships (1)
Other PGA Tour (2)

No.	Date	Tournament	Winning score	Margin of victory	Runner(s)-up
1	11 May 2025	Oneflight Myrtle Beach Classic	−15 (65-70-68-66=269)	Playoff	(United States) Harry Higgs, (Canada) Mackenzie Hughes
2	8 Jun 2025	RBC Canadian Open	−18 (66-66-64-68=262)	Playoff	(United States) Sam Burns
3	19 Jul 2026	The Open Championship	−10 (72-68-62-68=270)	1 stroke	(United States) Cameron Young

PGA Tour playoff record (2–0)

No.	Year	Tournament	Opponent(s)	Result
1	2025	Oneflight Myrtle Beach Classic	(United States) Harry Higgs, (Canada) Mackenzie Hughes	Won with birdie on first extra hole
2	2025	RBC Canadian Open	(United States) Sam Burns	Won with birdie on fourth extra hole

=== European Tour wins (5) ===
Legend
Major championships (1)
Rolex Series (1)
Other European Tour (3)

No.	Date	Tournament	Winning score	Margin of victory	Runner(s)-up
1	17 Feb 2019	ISPS Handa World Super 6 Perth^{1}	3 and 2		(Spain) Adrián Otaegui
2	13 Feb 2022	Ras Al Khaimah Classic	−22 (63-69-65-69=266)	5 strokes	(England) Ross Fisher
3	2 Oct 2022	Alfred Dunhill Links Championship	−15 (66-74-65-68=273)	1 stroke	(Sweden) Alex Norén, (England) Callum Shinkwin
4	17 Sep 2023	BMW PGA Championship	−18 (69-68-66-67=270)	1 stroke	(England) Tyrrell Hatton, (England) Aaron Rai
5	19 Jul 2026	The Open Championship	−10 (72-68-62-68=270)	1 stroke	(United States) Cameron Young

^{1}Co-sanctioned by the Asian Tour and the PGA Tour of Australasia

European Tour playoff record (0–2)

No.	Year	Tournament	Opponent	Result
1	2018	Dubai Duty Free Irish Open	(Scotland) Russell Knox	Lost to birdie on first extra hole
2	2022	Dutch Open	(France) Victor Perez	Lost to birdie on fourth extra hole

=== PGA Tour of Australasia wins (3) ===
No.	Date	Tournament	Winning score	Margin of victory	Runner(s)-up
1	19 Oct 2014	John Hughes/Nexus Risk Services WA Open	−23 (64-66-68-67=265)	6 strokes	(Australia) Stephen Dartnall
2	22 Feb 2015	Coca-Cola Queensland PGA Championship	−17 (72-64-65-62=263)	1 stroke	(Australia) Matthew Millar, (Australia) Cameron Smith
3	17 Feb 2019	ISPS Handa World Super 6 Perth^{1}	3 and 2		(Spain) Adrián Otaegui

^{1}Co-sanctioned by the European Tour and the Asian Tour

=== Challenge Tour wins (2) ===
No.	Date	Tournament	Winning score	Margin of victory	Runner(s)-up
1	26 Jul 2015	Le Vaudreuil Golf Challenge	−14 (62-67-68-73=270)	1 stroke	(France) Thomas Linard
2	31 Jul 2016	Tayto Northern Ireland Open	−19 (66-68-69-62=265)	4 strokes	(Germany) Dominic Foos, (South Africa) Dylan Frittelli, (England) Max Orrin, (Germany) Bernd Ritthammer

=== Charles Tour wins (3) ===
No.	Date	Tournament	Winning score	Margin of victory	Runner(s)-up
1	4 May 2014	Ask Metro Muriwai Open	−20 (68-64-67-69=268)	3 strokes	(New Zealand) Kieran Muir
2	4 Apr 2021	Clubroom Gulf Harbour Open	−23 (67-70-66-62=265)	7 strokes	(New Zealand) Josh Geary, (New Zealand) James Hydes (a)
3	11 Apr 2021	Autex Muriwai Open (2)	−25 (65-66-68-64=263)	3 strokes	(New Zealand) Daniel Hillier

=== Other wins (6) ===
No.	Date	Tournament	Winning score	Margin of victory	Runner(s)-up
1	11 Jun 2012	Fiji Open	−15 (66-67-68=201)	6 strokes	(New Zealand) Nick Gillespie, (Fiji) Tomasi Tuivuna
2	8 Jul 2012	Tahiti Open	−23 (66-69-62-68=265)	1 stroke	(Australia) Terry Pilkadaris
3	9 Jun 2013	Fiji Open (2)	−20 (67-72-64-65=268)	9 strokes	(New Zealand) Nick Gillespie
4	8 Jun 2014	Tahiti Open (2)	−20 (66-66-67-69=268)	1 stroke	(New Zealand) Kieran Muir
5	13 Jun 2020	Briscoes Wairakei Pro-Am Invitational	−24 (63-66-63=192)	13 strokes	(New Zealand) Gareth Paddison
6	22 Apr 2021	Briscoes Wairakei Pro-Am Invitational (2)	−12 (63-71-70=204)	1 stroke	(New Zealand) Josh Geary

== Major championships ==
=== Wins (1) ===
Year	Championship	54 holes	Winning score	Margin	Runner-up
2026	The Open Championship	2 shot deficit	−10 (72-68-62-68=270)	1 stroke	(United States) Cameron Young

=== Results timeline ===
Results not in chronological order in 2020.

Tournament	2015	2016	2017	2018
Masters Tournament				
U.S. Open				T41
The Open Championship	T49		CUT	T39
PGA Championship			T54	T27

Tournament	2019	2020	2021	2022	2023	2024	2025	2026
Masters Tournament					T26	T38		CUT
PGA Championship	CUT			54	T23	75	T28	T35
U.S. Open	CUT	CUT		CUT	T43	T56	T19	T23
The Open Championship	T16	NT	T67	CUT	T52	T25	CUT	1

Win
Did not play

CUT = missed the half-way cut
"T" = tied for place
NT = no tournament due to COVID-19 pandemic

=== Summary ===
Tournament	Wins	2nd	3rd	Top-5	Top-10	Top-25	Events	Cuts made
Masters Tournament	0	0	0	0	0	0	3	2
PGA Championship	0	0	0	0	0	1	8	7
U.S. Open	0	0	0	0	0	2	8	5
The Open Championship	1	0	0	1	1	3	10	7
Totals	1	0	0	1	1	6	29	21

- Most consecutive cuts made – 10 (2023 Masters – 2025 U.S. Open)
- Longest streak of top-10s – 1 (once, current)

== Results in The Players Championship ==
Tournament	2023	2024	2025	2026
The Players Championship	T27	CUT	T20	WD

CUT = missed the halfway cut

WD = withdrew from tournament
"T" indicates a tie for a place

== Results in World Golf Championships ==
Tournament	2017	2018	2019	2020	2021	2022	2023
Championship			T67	T29			
Match Play				NT^{1}			T17
Invitational							
Champions	T46	T30		NT^{1}	NT^{1}	NT^{1}	

^{1}Cancelled due to COVID-19 pandemic

Did not play

NT = No tournament
"T" = Tied
Note that the Championship and Invitational were discontinued from 2022. The Champions was discontinued from 2023.

== Team appearances ==
Amateur

- Nomura Cup (representing New Zealand): 2009, 2011
- Eisenhower Trophy (representing New Zealand): 2010
- Sloan Morpeth Trophy (representing New Zealand): 2009, 2010

Professional

- Presidents Cup (representing the International team): 2026
- World Cup (representing New Zealand): 2016, 2018

== See also ==
- 2016 Challenge Tour graduates
- 2023 Race to Dubai dual card winners
