= Ben Campbell (New Zealand golfer) =

New Zealand professional golfer

Personal information
- Nationality: New Zealand
- Born: 20 August 1991 (age 35) Masterton, New Zealand

Career
- Sport: Golf
- Turned professional: 2012
- Current tours: LIV Golf; Asian Tour
- Former tours: PGA Tour of Australasia; Charles Tour
- Professional wins: 4

Number of wins by tour
- Asian Tour: 2
- PGA Tour of Australasia: 1
- Other: 1

Best results in major championships
- Masters Tournament: DNP
- PGA Championship: DNP
- U.S. Open: DNP
- The Open Championship: CUT: 2022

Ben Campbell (born 20 August 1991) is a professional golfer from New Zealand. Since 2018, he has played primarily on the Asian Tour where he won the 2023 Hong Kong Open. He has also won the New Zealand PGA Championship on the PGA Tour of Australasia.

== Early life and amateur career ==
Campbell had a successful amateur career and was ranked as high as sixth on the World Amateur Golf Ranking. In 2010, he won the Carrus Tauranga Open on the Charles Tour, ahead of Michael Hendry in second and Ryan Fox in third.

He was runner-up at the 2010 and 2011 Australian Amateur.

Campbell represented his country twice in the Eisenhower Trophy, the World Amateur Team Championship, finishing fourth individually in 2010 behind future European Tour players Joachim B. Hansen, Alexander Levy and Romain Wattel. In 2012, he represented Asia/Pacific at the Bonallack Trophy in Portugal alongside Hideki Matsuyama and Cameron Smith.

== Professional career ==
Campbell turned professional in late 2012 and started playing on the PGA Tour of Australasia. In 2014, he finished 4th at the WA PGA Championship, two strokes behind winner Ryan Lynch, having led the tournament after an opening round of 65. In 2017, he was runner-up at both the New Zealand PGA Championship and the New Zealand Open, before winning the New Zealand PGA Championship in 2018.

He earned an Asian Tour card via the 2018 Qualifying School, having finished tied seventh. In his rookie season, he was runner-up at the AB Bank Bangladesh Open, 3 strokes behind Malcolm Kokocinski. He also tied for 3rd at the Fiji International, an event co-sanctioned by the European Tour.

Campbell was runner-up behind Dimitrios Papadatos at the 2022 Vic Open, an event part of The Open Qualifying Series, which earned him a start at the 2022 Open Championship at the Old Course at St Andrews.

In 2023, he was again runner-up at the New Zealand Open before triumphing at the Hong Kong Open, where he birdied the final two holes to beat Cameron Smith by one stroke. He won US$360,000.

In 2024, Campbell took part in a LIV Golf event for the first time, filling in for Cameron Smith on Ripper GC as a substitute after Smith withdrew from the LIV Golf Miami event after the first round.

== Professional wins (4) ==
=== Asian Tour wins (2) ===
Legend
International Series (2)
Other Asian Tour (0)

No.	Date	Tournament	Winning score	Margin of victory	Runner-up
1	12 Nov 2023	Hong Kong Open	−19 (66-64-65-66=261)	1 stroke	(Australia) Cameron Smith
2	7 Jul 2024	International Series Morocco	−15 (68-70-68-71=277)	Playoff	(United States) John Catlin

Asian Tour playoff record (1–0)

No.	Year	Tournament	Opponent	Result
1	2024	International Series Morocco	(United States) John Catlin	Won with birdie on first extra hole

=== PGA Tour of Australasia wins (1) ===
No.	Date	Tournament	Winning score	Margin of victory	Runners-up
1	25 Feb 2018	Horizon Golf New Zealand PGA Championship	−18 (64-66-67-69=266)	2 strokes	(New Zealand) Ashley Hall, (Australia) Deyen Lawson

PGA Tour of Australasia playoff record (0–1)

No.	Year	Tournament	Opponents	Result
1	2017	ISPS Handa New Zealand Open	(New Zealand) Michael Hendry, (Australia) Brad Kennedy	Hendry won with par on first extra hole

=== Charles Tour wins (1) ===
No.	Date	Tournament	Winning score	Margin of victory	Runner-up
1	2 May 2010	Carrus Tauranga Open (as an amateur)	−19 (66-65-64-66=261)	4 strokes	(New Zealand) Michael Hendry

== Results in major championships ==
Tournament	2022
Masters Tournament	
U.S. Open	
The Open Championship	CUT
PGA Championship	

Did not play

CUT = missed the half-way cut

== Team appearances ==
Amateur

- Sloan Morpeth Trophy (representing New Zealand): 2010, 2012
- Bonallack Trophy (representing Asia/Pacific): 2012
- Eisenhower Trophy (representing New Zealand): 2010, 2012
