= Golf Tour of New Zealand =

Professional golf tour

- Sport: Golf
- Founded: 2004
- Founder: Greg Turner
- Folded: 2007
- Replaced by: Charles Tour
- Country: Based in New Zealand
- Most titles: Tournament wins: (New Zealand) Doug Holloway (3)

The Golf Tour of New Zealand was a New Zealand-based golf tour which ran from 2004 to 2007. It was founded by Greg Turner. It was superseded by the Charles Tour. Tournaments were over 72 holes.

The first event on the tour was the Taranaki Open in late 2004. The Taranaki Open was the only event in 2004 and 2005 but was joined by the Tauranga Open and the Wairakei Open in 2006. These three events, together with the AMP Open at Titirangi were played in 2007. In 2007 there was a dispute between the tour and the New Zealand PGA, which meant the Golf Tour of New Zealand withdrew their support for the Wairakei Open and, possibly, Taranaki Open, and the AMP Open was run without the sanction of the NZPGA. The tour was replaced by the Charles Tour which started in 2008.

== Tournaments ==
Date	Tournament	Location	Purse (NZ$)	Winner (Note: The number in brackets after each winner's name is the number of Golf Tour of New Zealand events they had won up to and including that tournament.)	Ref.
3 Oct 2004	Olex Taranaki Open	Taranaki	40,000	(New Zealand) Ryan Haywood (1)	
2 Oct 2005	Olex Taranaki Open	Taranaki	40,000	(New Zealand) Doug Holloway (a) (1)	
21 May 2006	Carrus Tauranga Open	Bay of Plenty	40,000	(New Zealand) Josh Geary (a) (1)	
17 Sep 2006	Wairakei Open	Waikato	40,000	(New Zealand) Doug Holloway (2)	
1 Oct 2006	Olex Taranaki Open	Taranaki	40,000	(New Zealand) Mark Brown (1)	
29 Apr 2007	Carrus Tauranga Open	Bay of Plenty	40,000	(New Zealand) Mark Purser (1)	
16 Sep 2007	Youthtown Wairakei Open	Waikato	40,000	(New Zealand) Doug Holloway (3)	
30 Sep 2007	Bayleys Taranaki Open	Taranaki	40,000	(New Zealand) Bradley Iles (1)	
7 Oct 2007	AMP Open	Auckland	40,000	(New Zealand) Mark Purser (2)	

== See also ==
- New Zealand Open
