= Tim Wilkinson =

New Zealand professional golfer (born 1976)

Personal information
- Full name: Timothy David Wilkinson
- Nationality: New Zealand
- Born: 26 July 1978 (age 48) Palmerston North, New Zealand
- Height: 1.74 m (5 ft 9 in)
- Weight: 70 kg (154 lb; 11 st 0 lb)

Career
- Sport: Golf
- Turned professional: 2003
- Current tour: PGA Tour
- Former tours: Korn Ferry Tour; PGA Tour of Australasia
- Professional wins: 1

Best results in major championships
- Masters Tournament: DNP
- PGA Championship: DNP
- U.S. Open: T48: 2018
- The Open Championship: DNP

Timothy David Wilkinson (born 26 July 1978) is a professional golfer from New Zealand.

== Early life ==
Wilkinson was born in Palmerston North, and was educated at St Peter's College. He won the New Zealand Stroke Play Championship in 2000.

== Professional career ==
In 2003, Wilkinson turned pro. He joined the second tier Nationwide Tour in 2005, but failed to win enough money to graduate directly to the PGA Tour. He finally obtained his PGA Tour card by finishing inside the top 25 at the 2007 qualifying school.

Wilkinson had a successful rookie season on the PGA Tour in 2008, the highlights being an outright third at the Zurich Classic of New Orleans and finishing joint runner-up at the Valero Texas Open, two shots behind winner Zach Johnson. He made over one million dollars in prize money and finished 92nd on the final money list.

In 2009, Wilkinson played in the final pairing at the Verizon Heritage, but faded to finish T6. A thumb ligament injury curtailed his season and saw him gain a major medical extension of his playing rights. By June 2010 he had played the 12 events this extension afforded him, and had not earned enough money to retain his status.

Wilkinson finished fifth on the 2013 Web.com Tour regular season money list to earn his 2014 PGA Tour card.

== Amateur wins ==
- 2000 New Zealand Stroke Play Championship
- 2001 Singapore Open Amateur Championship
- 2002 SBS Invitational

== Professional wins (1) ==
=== Charles Tour wins (1) ===
No.	Date	Tournament	Winning score	Margin of victory	Runners-up
1	27 Sep 2026	Carrus Tauranga Open	−20 (63-66-65-66=260)	7 strokes	(New Zealand) Josh Geary, (New Zealand) Kerry Mountcastle

== Playoff record ==
Korn Ferry Tour playoff record (0–1)

No.	Year	Tournament	Opponent	Result
1	2019	LECOM Health Challenge	(United States) Ryan Brehm	Lost to birdie on first extra hole

== Results in major championships ==
Tournament	2016	2017	2018
Masters Tournament			
U.S. Open	T61		T48
The Open Championship			
PGA Championship			

Did not play

CUT = missed the half-way cut
"T" indicates a tie for a place

== Team appearances ==
Amateur

- Nomura Cup (representing New Zealand): 2001
- Eisenhower Trophy (representing New Zealand): 2002
- Bonallack Trophy (representing Asia/Pacific): 2002 (winners)

Professional

- World Cup (representing New Zealand): 2013

== See also ==
- 2007 PGA Tour Qualifying School graduates
- 2013 Web.com Tour Finals graduates
- 2015 Web.com Tour Finals graduates
- 2016 Web.com Tour Finals graduates
- 2019 Korn Ferry Tour Finals graduates
