= Carrus Tauranga Open =

Golf tournament

Tournament information
- Location: Gate Pa, Tauranga, New Zealand
- Established: 2006
- Course: Tauranga Golf Club
- Par: 70
- Tours: Charles Tour; Golf Tour of New Zealand
- Format: Stroke play
- Prize fund: NZ$50,000
- Month played: September

Tournament record score
- Aggregate: 251 Josh Geary (2025)
- To par: −29 as above

Current champion
- (New Zealand) Tim Wilkinson

Location map
- Location in New Zealand

The Carrus Tauranga Open is an annual 72-hole golf tournament staged at Tauranga Golf Club in Gate Pa, Tauranga, New Zealand. In 2006 and 2007 it was an event on the Golf Tour of New Zealand while events since 2008 have been part of the Charles Tour.

There have been three rounds of 59 in the event. Richard Lee made one in 2010, while Mark Brown has made two, in 2014 and 2018.

== Winners ==
| Year | Tour (Note: CHAR − Charles Tour; GTNZ − Golf Tour of New Zealand.) | Winner | Score | To par | Margin of victory | Runner(s)-up | Ref. |
Carrus Tauranga Open
| 2026 | CHAR | (New Zealand) Tim Wilkinson | 260 | −20 | 7 strokes | (New Zealand) Josh Geary (New Zealand) Kerry Mountcastle | |
| 2025 | CHAR | (New Zealand) Josh Geary (6) | 251 | −29 | 12 strokes | (New Zealand) James Hydes | |
| 2024 | CHAR | (New Zealand) Josh Geary (5) | 259 | −21 | 5 strokes | (New Zealand) Jayden Ford (a) | |
| 2023 | CHAR | (New Zealand) Josh Geary (4) | 265 | −15 | 1 stroke | (New Zealand) Tyler Hodge | |
| 2022 | CHAR | (New Zealand) Sam Jones (a) | 259 | −21 | 3 strokes | (New Zealand) Woonchul Na | |
| 2021 | CHAR | Cancelled due to the COVID-19 pandemic | | | | | |
Carrus Open
| 2020 | CHAR | (New Zealand) Luke Toomey (2) | 266 | −14 | 1 stroke | (New Zealand) James Hydes (a) (New Zealand) Woonchul Na | |
| 2019 | CHAR | (New Zealand) Luke Toomey | 258 | −22 | 6 strokes | (New Zealand) Kazuma Kobori (a) (New Zealand) Woonchul Na | |
| 2018 | CHAR | (New Zealand) Kerry Mountcastle (a) | 264 | −16 | 1 stroke | (New Zealand) Mark Brown (South Korea) Kang Dong-woo (New Zealand) Lachie McDonald | |
| 2017 | CHAR | (New Zealand) Mark Brown (4) | 262 | −18 | 2 strokes | (New Zealand) Harry Bateman (New Zealand) Gareth Paddison | |
2016: No tournament
| 2015 | CHAR | (New Zealand) Mark Brown (3) | 266 | −14 | 1 stroke | (New Zealand) Jim Cusdin (New Zealand) Joshua Munn (a) | |
| 2014 | CHAR | (New Zealand) Mark Brown (2) | 263 | −17 | 2 strokes | (New Zealand) Doug Holloway | |
| 2013 | CHAR | (New Zealand) Josh Geary (3) | 262 | −18 | 8 strokes | (New Zealand) Richard Lee (New Zealand) Troy Ropiha | |
| 2012 | CHAR | (New Zealand) Mark Brown | 263 | −17 | 4 strokes | (New Zealand) Troy Ropiha | |
| 2011 | CHAR | (New Zealand) Jim Cusdin | 265 | −15 | 2 strokes | (New Zealand) Ryan Fox (a) | |
Carrus Tauranga Open
| 2010 | CHAR | (New Zealand) Ben Campbell (a) | 261 | −19 | 4 strokes | (New Zealand) Michael Hendry | |
| 2009 | CHAR | (New Zealand) Michael Hendry | 268 | −12 | Playoff | (Australia) Peter Fowler | |
| 2008 | CHAR | (New Zealand) Josh Geary (2) | 266 | −14 | Playoff | (New Zealand) Grant Moorhead | |
| 2007 | GTNZ | (New Zealand) Mark Purser | 263 | −21 | 1 stroke | (New Zealand) Leighton James (a) | |
| 2006 | GTNZ | (New Zealand) Josh Geary (a) | 262 | −22 | 8 strokes | (New Zealand) Kevin Smith (a) | |
