= Challenge Costa Brava =

Golf tournament in Spain

Tournament information
- Location: Girona, Catalonia, Spain
- Established: 2021
- Course: Empordà Golf
- Par: 71
- Length: 6,896 yards (6,306 m)
- Tour: Challenge Tour
- Format: Stroke play
- Prize fund: €200,000
- Month played: October
- Final year: 2021

Tournament record score
- Aggregate: 265 Daniel Hillier (2021)
- To par: −19 as above

Current champion
- (New Zealand) Daniel Hillier

Location map
- Location in Spain Location in Catalonia

The Challenge Costa Brava was a golf tournament on the Challenge Tour held at Empordà Golf on the Costa Brava near Girona, Catalonia, Spain.

Together with the Empordà Challenge, also hosted at Empordà Golf, the tournament served as a replacement for the China Swing with Hainan Open and Foshan Open, which was cancelled.

== Winners ==
Year	Winner	Score	To par	Margin of victory	Runner-up
2021	(New Zealand) Daniel Hillier	265	−19	1 stroke	(Denmark) Marcus Helligkilde
