= Michael Hendry =

New Zealand professional golfer (born 1979)

Personal information
- Nationality: New Zealand
- Born: 15 October 1979 (age 47) Auckland, New Zealand
- Height: 1.86 m (6 ft 1 in)
- Weight: 95 kg (209 lb; 15.0 st)

Career
- Sport: Golf
- Turned professional: 2005
- Current tours: Japan Golf Tour; Asian Tour; PGA Tour of Australasia; Charles Tour
- Former tour: OneAsia Tour
- Professional wins: 18

Number of wins by tour
- Japan Golf Tour: 2
- PGA Tour of Australasia: 4
- Other: 12

Best results in major championships
- Masters Tournament: DNP
- PGA Championship: DNP
- U.S. Open: DNP
- The Open Championship: CUT: 2017, 2018, 2024

Michael Hendry (born 15 October 1979) is a professional golfer from New Zealand. Since 2013 he has played primarily on the Japan Golf Tour where he has won twice. He has also won four times on the PGA Tour of Australasia.

== Career ==
Hendry was born in Auckland, New Zealand.

Hendry turned professional in 2005. He plays on the PGA Tour of Australasia where has won the New Zealand PGA Championship twice and the New Zealand Open. In 2012, he finished second on the Order of Merit. In 2017, he became the first New Zealander since Mahal Pearce in 2003 to win the New Zealand Open when he defeated fellow kiwi Ben Campbell and Australian Brad Kennedy in a playoff at Millbrook Resort. Hendry has the most wins on the Charles Tour, with nine between 2009 and 2023.

Hendry also won the 2010 Indonesia Open on the OneAsia Tour. He finished third on the Order of Merit in 2010 and sixth in 2011.

Since 2013 he has played primarily on the Japan Golf Tour. In April 2015, Hendry won for the first time on the tour, at the Token Homemate Cup with a one stroke victory. In both 2017 and 2018 he was runner-up in the Gateway to The Open Mizuno Open, earning him a place in that year's Open Championship. He missed the cut on both occasions.

In May 2023, Hendry announced that he had been diagnosed with leukemia and would be taking indefinite leave from the game. Having finished runner-up at the World City Championship in Hong Kong on the Asian Tour in March, he had to forfeit his exemption into the 2023 Open Championship. Four months later, Hendry returned to professional competition, playing on the Charles Tour. Two weeks later, Hendry won his first event since returning on the Charles Tour.

In May 2024, Hendry won the For The Players by The Players tournament on the Japan Golf Tour. It was his second win on the tour and came almost a year after being diagnosed with leukemia. The R&A awarded a special exemption to Hendry for the 2024 Open Championship.

== Professional wins (18) ==
=== Japan Golf Tour wins (2) ===
No.	Date	Tournament	Winning score	Margin of victory	Runner-up
1	1 Apr 2015	Token Homemate Cup	−15 (67-69-69-64=269)	1 stroke	(Japan) Kazuhiro Yamashita
2	12 May 2024	For The Players by The Players	38 pts (14-5-13-6=38)	1 point	(Japan) Hideto Kobukuro

=== PGA Tour of Australasia wins (4) ===
No.	Date	Tournament	Winning score	Margin of victory	Runner(s)-up
1	1 Apr 2012	New Zealand PGA Pro-Am Championship	−16 (69-68-67-68=272)	2 strokes	(New Zealand) Mark Brown, (Australia) Andrew Martin
2	3 Mar 2013	New Zealand PGA Championship (2)	−19 (67-67-68-67=269)	Playoff	(Australia) Scott Strange
3	12 Mar 2017	ISPS Handa New Zealand Open	−19 (65-65-67-69=266)	Playoff	(New Zealand) Ben Campbell, (Australia) Brad Kennedy
4	12 Feb 2023	Vic Open	−21 (64-62-69-72=267)	4 strokes	(Australia) David Micheluzzi

PGA Tour of Australasia playoff record (2–0)

No.	Year	Tournament	Opponent(s)	Result
1	2013	New Zealand PGA Championship	(Australia) Scott Strange	Won with par on first extra hole
2	2017	ISPS Handa New Zealand Open	(New Zealand) Ben Campbell, (Australia) Brad Kennedy	Won with par on first extra hole

=== OneAsia Tour wins (1) ===
No.	Date	Tournament	Winning score	Margin of victory	Runner-up
1	4 Jul 2010	Indonesia Open	−19 (70-67-67-65=269)	7 strokes	(China) Liang Wenchong

=== Charles Tour wins (10) ===
No.	Date	Tournament	Winning score	Margin of victory	Runner(s)-up
1	17 May 2009	Carrus Tauranga Open	−12 (67-68-65-68=268)	Playoff	(Australia) Peter Fowler
2	4 Oct 2009	Port Taranaki Open	−8 (70-69-68-73=280)	2 strokes	(New Zealand) Doug Holloway
3	16 May 2010	Rapid Labels Muriwai Open	−17 (67-68-68-68=271)	1 stroke	(New Zealand) Richard Lee
4	12 May 2013	Ask Metro Muriwai Open (2)	−18 (65-69-67-69=270)	2 strokes	(New Zealand) Richard Lee
5	22 Mar 2015	Lawnmaster Classic	−23 (64-64-70-67=265)	3 strokes	(New Zealand) Josh Geary, (New Zealand) Joshua Munn (a)
6	20 Mar 2016	Lawnmaster Classic (2)	−17 (61-72-66=199) (Note: Shortened to 36/54 holes due to weather.)	2 strokes	(New Zealand) Josh Geary
7	21 Mar 2021	Renaissance Brewery NZ Stroke Play Championship	−13 (65-70-68-68=271)	4 strokes	(New Zealand) Mark Brown
8	23 Oct 2022	Taranaki Open (2)	−16 (67-70-69-66=272)	3 strokes	(New Zealand) Josh Geary
9	15 Oct 2023	DVS Clearwater Open	−2 (68-74=142)	Playoff	(New Zealand) Jared Edwards (a), (New Zealand) Josh Geary, (New Zealand) Tyler Hodge, (South Korea) Kang Dong-woo
10	14 Feb 2025	Race to Tieke	−16 (64-67-66=197)	1 stroke	(New Zealand) Cooper Moore (a)

=== Other wins (1) ===
- 2010 Fiji Open

== Results in major championships ==
Tournament	2017	2018
Masters Tournament		
U.S. Open		
The Open Championship	CUT	CUT
PGA Championship		

Tournament	2019	2020	2021	2022	2023	2024
Masters Tournament						
PGA Championship						
U.S. Open						
The Open Championship		NT				CUT

Did not play

CUT = missed the half-way cut NT = no tournament due to COVID-19 pandemic

== Results in World Golf Championships ==
Results not in chronological order before 2015.

Tournament	2013	2014	2015	2016	2017
Championship	T58				T52
Match Play					
Invitational					
Champions	T50	T64			T65

Did not play

"T" = tied

== Team appearances ==
- World Cup (representing New Zealand): 2011, 2013
