= Tahiti Open =

Tournament information
- Location: Papeete, Tahiti, French Polynesia
- Established: 1982
- Course(s): Moorea Green Pearl GC (2017–); Olivier Bréaud International GC
- Organized by: Federation Polynesienne de Golf and PGA Tour of Australasia NSW/ACT Division
- Tour(s): Ladbrokes PGA Pro-Am Series
- Format: Stroke play
- Prize fund: $125,000
- Month played: September

The Tahiti Open is a professional golf tournament played in Tahiti, French Polynesia.

== History ==
The Federation Polynesienne de Golf based in Papeete was founded in 1981 and launched the national open golf championship, the Tahiti Open, in 1982. The inaugural tournament was won by singer Danny Kaleikini from Hawaii. The tournament then consisted of two rounds, raised to four by the second edition which was won by Kalua Makalena, also from Hawaii. The tournament then consisted of three rounds for eight years, before returning to a four-round format in 1992 when the organizers started collaborating with the PGA Tour of Australasia.

Australian and New Zealand players have dominated the tournament. Grant Moorhead has won four times and Ryan Fox won both the 29th and 30th staging of the tournament, part of the Choice Hotels PGA Pro-Am Series. By 2018 the purse was $125,000, the largest prize purse in the PGA Tour of Australasia's Ladbrokes PGA Pro-Am Series.

== Winners ==
Year	Winner	Score		Ref
2019	(Australia) Jamie Arnold	68-67-70-67=272	−8	
2018	(Australia) Tim Stewart	67-68-72-65=272	−8	
2017	(Australia) Dale Brandt-Richards	64-70-68-71=273	−7	
2016	No tournament			
2015	(New Zealand) Callan O'Reilly	68-65-64-71=268	−20	
2014	(New Zealand) Ryan Fox	66-66-67-69=268	−20	
2013	No tournament			
2012	(New Zealand) Ryan Fox	66-69-62-68=265	−23	
2011	(New Zealand) Grant Moorhead	65-69-64=198	−18	
2010	(Australia) Josh Lane	71-73-70-68=242	−6	
2009	No tournament			
2008	(Australia) Edward Stedman	69-66-70-69=274	−14	
2007	(New Zealand) Josh Carmichael	66-70-65-66=267	−21	
2006	(Australia) Chris Downes	69-63-62-65=259	−29	
2005	(Australia) Andrew McKenzie	70-68-67-65=270	−18	
2003	(New Zealand) Tony Christie	66-65-71-64=266	−22	
2002	(Australia) Jason Dawes	68-60-67-70=265	−23	
2001	(New Zealand) Chris Gray	68-66-65-68=267	−21	
2000	(Australia) David Bransdon	71-63-66-69=269	−19	
1999	(New Zealand) Stuart Thompson	70-66-68-69=273	−15	
1998	(New Zealand) Tony Christie	68-68-72-70=278	−10	
1997	(New Zealand) Dominic Barson	70-68-65-70=273	−15	
1996	(Australia) Steven Alker	65-68-69-70=272	−16	
1995	(New Zealand) Grant Moorhead	69-68-67-70=274	−14	
1994	(New Zealand) Grant Moorhead	71-67-71-71=280	−8	
1993	(New Zealand) Grant Moorhead	70-72-69-72=283	−5	
1992	(Australia) John Clifford	72-70-69-71=282	−6	
1991	(New Zealand) Simon Owen	69-74-68=211	−5	
1990	(Chile) Roy McKenzie	70-70-70=210	−6	
1989	(Australia) Jason Deep	67-69-71=207	−9	
1988	(Australia) Jason Deep	70-73=143	−1	
1987	(Australia) Lee Hunter	69-69-74=212	−4	
1986	(Australia) Brett Ogle	69-69-69=207	−9	
1985	(Australia) John Clifford	69-71-70=210	−6	
1984	(New Zealand) Barry Vivian	69-71-70=210	−6	
1983	(United States) Kalua Makalena	73-72-72-72=289	+1	
1982	(United States) Danny Kaleikini	72-65=137	−7	
