= SBS Invitational =

The SBS Invitational was a 72-hole amateur stroke-play team championship played from 1977 to 2015. Teams were invited from the 15 golf associations of New Zealand. The event served as the New Zealand Teams Stroke Play Championships and winners were awarded the Macquarie Cup. It was permanently hosted at the Invercargill Golf Club in Otatara, Invercargill, and was most often played in the first weekend of March, although later events were played at other times. To celebrate 30 years of the Invitational, a team from Australia was sent to compete in the tournament. The event was discontinued in 2016 because of scheduling problems.

== Format ==
Played on Saturday and Sunday, a 72-hole team championship with the four lowest scores from each team of five counting in each stroke-play round. The teams included Aorangi, Auckland, Bay of Plenty, Canterbury, Hawke's Bay, Manawatu/Wanganui, North Harbour, Northland, Otago, Poverty Bay/East Coast, Southland, Taranaki, Tasman, Waikato, and Wellington.

== Macquarie Cup ==
Year	Winner	Score
1977	Southland	923
1979	Auckland	885
1980	Otago	1167
1981	Auckland	1169
1982	Canterbury	1200
1983	Canterbury	1163
1984	Canterbury	1194
1985	Southland	1191
1986	Canterbury	1164
1987	Auckland	1169
1988	Auckland	1181
1989	Wellington	878
1990	Canterbury	1177
1991	Auckland	1166
1992	Wellington	1145
1993	Auckland	1187
1994	Tasman	1163
1995	Tasman	1179
1996	Wellington	1169
1997	Canterbury	1186
1998	Canterbury	1154
1999	Wellington	1148
2000	Canterbury	1130
2001	Bay of Plenty	1167
2002	Manawatu/Wanganui	1167
2003	Bay of Plenty	1144
2004	Waikato	1139
2005	Auckland	1152
2006	Bay of Plenty	1176
2007	North Harbour	1141
2008	Auckland	1171
2009	North Harbour	1158
2010	Auckland	1130
2011	Auckland	1142
2012	Manawatu/Wanganui	1133
2013	Auckland	1144
2014	Bay of Plenty	881
2015	Otago	1184

- Played over 54 holes in 1977, 1979, 1989 and 2014

== Player of the Tournament ==
Year	Winner	Province	Score
1977	C E Taylor	Waikato	221
1979	P K Creighton	Auckland	217
1980	Rodney Barltrop	Wellington	284
1981	N A Gaskin	Manawatu/Wanganui	285
1982	J N Williamson	Canterbury	292
1983	Michael Atkinson	Otago	283
1984	J N Williamson	Canterbury	292
1985	N A Gaskin	Manawatu/Wanganui	288
1986	G W Goldfinch	Auckland	286
1987	F J Poskitt	Canterbury	292
1988	L G Phelps	Wellington	291
1989	B G Paterson	Canterbury	214
1990	H Morgan	Tasman	287
1991	Steve Alker	Waikato	283
1992	Tony Christie	Canterbury	281
1993	Marcus Wheelhouse	Auckland	290
1994	G Domigan	Tasman	285
1995	M Lloyd	Bay of Plenty	291
1996	G MacFarlane	Bay of Plenty	283
1997	David Rattray	Southland	288
1998	Carl Brooking	Canterbury	282
1999	Reon Sayer	Wellington	280
2000	Gareth Paddison	Wellington	279
2001	K Skellern	Bay of Plenty	288
2002	Tim Wilkinson	Manawatu/Wanganui	279
2003	Matthew Holten	Waikato	275
2004	Joshua Carmichael	North Harbour	278
2005	Kevin Chun	Auckland	279
2006	David Rattray	Canterbury	286
2007	Rohan Blizard	Australia	273
2008	Sean Riordan	Tasman	286
2009	Scott Johnson	North Harbour	281
2010	Simon Brownlee	North Harbour	279
2011	Ryan Fox	Auckland	280
2012	Blair Riordan	Tasman	276
2013	Brent McEwan	St Clair	273
2014	Luke Toomey	Waikato	214
2015	Ryan Chisnall	Tasman	287

- Air New Zealand Cup 1977–2002
- Russell Haywood Memorial 2003–2015
