= 2013 PGA Tour of Australasia =

Golf tour season

2013 PGA Tour of Australasia season
- Duration: 17 January 2013 – 1 December 2013
- Number of official events: 14
- Most wins: (Australia) Adam Scott (2)
- Order of Merit: (Australia) Adam Scott

The 2013 PGA Tour of Australasia was the 40th season on the PGA Tour of Australasia, the main professional golf tour in Australia and New Zealand since it was formed in 1973.

== Schedule ==
The following table lists official events during the 2013 season.

Date	Tournament	Location	Purse (A$)	Winner (Note: The number in brackets after each winner's name is the number of PGA Tour of Australasia events they had won up to and including that tournament. This information is only shown for PGA Tour of Australasia members.)	OWGR points	Other tours (Note: EUR − European Tour; ONE − OneAsia Tour.)	Notes
20 Jan	Turner Plumbing Victorian PGA Championship	Victoria	130,000	(Australia) David McKenzie (1)	6		
27 Jan	Lexus of Blackburn Heritage Classic	Victoria	130,000	(Australia) David Bransdon (2)	6		New tournament
17 Feb	Coca-Cola Queensland PGA Championship	Queensland	115,000	(Australia) Brad Kennedy (3)	6		
24 Feb	Victorian Open	Victoria	150,000	(Australia) Matthew Giles (1)	6		
3 Mar	New Zealand PGA Championship	New Zealand	NZ$550,000	(New Zealand) Michael Hendry (2)	16		
25 Aug	Isuzu Queensland Open	Queensland	110,000	(Australia) Nick Cullen (1)	6		
21 Sep	South Pacific Open Championship	New Caledonia	130,000	(Australia) Andre Stolz (5)	6		
6 Oct	WA Goldfields PGA Championship	Western Australia	110,000	(Australia) Jack Wilson (1)	6		
13 Oct	John Hughes/Nexus Risk Services WA Open	Western Australia	110,000	(New Zealand) Josh Geary (1)	6		
20 Oct	ISPS Handa Perth International	Western Australia	US$2,000,000	(South Korea) Jin Jeong (1)	20	EUR	
10 Nov	Australian PGA Championship	Queensland	1,250,000	(Australia) Adam Scott (4)	22	ONE	
17 Nov	Talisker Masters	Victoria	1,000,000	(Australia) Adam Scott (5)	26		
24 Nov	Gloria Jean's Coffees NSW Open	New South Wales	110,000	(Australia) Aron Price (1)	6		
1 Dec	Emirates Australian Open	New South Wales	1,250,000	(Northern Ireland) Rory McIlroy (n/a)	32	ONE	Flagship event

=== Unofficial events ===
The following events were sanctioned by the PGA Tour of Australasia, but did not carry official money, nor were wins official.

Date	Tournament	Location	Purse (A$)	Winner(s)	OWGR points	Notes
24 Nov	ISPS Handa World Cup of Golf	Victoria	US$1,000,000	(Australia) Jason Day and (Australia) Adam Scott	n/a	Team event
24 Nov	World Cup of Golf Individual Trophy	Victoria	US$7,000,000	(Australia) Jason Day	40	

== Order of Merit ==
The Order of Merit was based on prize money won during the season, calculated in Australian dollars.

Position	Player	Prize money (A$)
1	(Australia) Adam Scott	538,620
2	(South Korea) Jin Jeong	342,663
3	(New Zealand) Michael Hendry	118,783
4	(Australia) Brody Ninyette	115,878
5	(Australia) Jack Wilson	108,758
