= Invercargill Golf Club =

Golf club in Southland, New Zealand

- Interactive map of Invercargill Golf Club
- 46°25′54″S 168°17′01″E

Club information
- Location: Otatara, New Zealand
- Established: 1900
- Type: Private
- Total holes: 18
- Tournaments: New Zealand Open (1960); SBS Invitational (1977–2016)
- Website: Official website
- Par: 72 (blue & white); 74 (yellow & red)
- Length: 6,068 m (6,636 yd) (blue); 5,636 m (6,164 yd) (white); 5,204 m (5,691 yd) (yellow); 5,069 m (5,544 yd) (red)

The Invercargill Golf Club is a golf club in Southland, New Zealand, located on Dunns Road in Otatara, near Invercargill.

In 1960, Invercargill Golf Club hosted the New Zealand Open, which was won by Peter Thomson. It was also the permanent host of the SBS Invitational, which was contested at the course annually from 1977 to 2016.
