= 2013 World Cup of Golf =

Coordinates: 37.9695°S 145.0308°E

Tournament information
- Dates: 21–24 November
- Location: Melbourne, Australia
- Course: Royal Melbourne Golf Club
- Format: 72 holes stroke play

Statistics
- Par: 71
- Length: 7,046 yards (6,443 m)
- Field: 60 man individual 26 two-man teams
- Cut: None
- Prize fund: US$8.0 million $7.0 million – individual $1.0 million – team
- Winner's share: $1.2 million – individual $600,000 – team

Champion
- Jason Day – individual Australia – team Jason Day & Adam Scott
- Individual – 274 (−10); Team – 551 (−17)

Location in Australia
Location in Victoria
Location in greater Melbourne

The 2013 ISPS Handa World Cup of Golf is a golf tournament that was played 21–24 November at Royal Melbourne Golf Club in Melbourne, Australia. It was the 57th World Cup. The format changed from being a team event to being primarily an individual event with a team component. Sixty players from 34 countries competed in the individual tournament and 26 teams (two-player combined score) competed for the team prize. The total purse was US$8 million, $7 million for the individual competition and $1 million for the teams. The event was a 72-hole stroke play tournament. Official World Golf Ranking points were award for the first time in the World Cup.

Australia's Jason Day shot a final round 70 to win the individual tournament. Day teamed with Adam Scott to win the team prize.

== Qualification ==
The field was based on the Official World Golf Ranking on 23 September 2013. The top 15 players in the rankings were eligible with a limit of four players per country. After the top 15, players were eligible with a limit of two players per country until the field of 60 players was filled. The individual portion was similar to what was used at the 2016 Summer Olympics, except that England, Scotland, and Wales fielded teams instead of a single Great Britain team in the Olympics.

== Players ==
The table below lists the players together with their World Ranking at the time of the tournament.

Player	Country	Ranking
Felipe Aguilar	Chile	157
Kiradech Aphibarnrat	Thailand	68
Bae Sang-moon	South Korea	131
Gaganjeet Bhullar	India	193
Thomas Bjørn	Denmark	44
Jonas Blixt	Sweden	39
Grégory Bourdy	France	112
Rafa Cabrera-Bello	Spain	127
K. J. Choi	South Korea	129
George Coetzee	South Africa	91
Nicolas Colsaerts	Belgium	63
Adilson da Silva	Brazil	247
Jason Day	Australia	18
Brendon de Jonge	Zimbabwe	67
Robert-Jan Derksen	Netherlands	269
Victor Dubuisson	France	32
Óscar Fraustro	Mexico	488
Brad Fritsch	Canada	309
Stephen Gallacher	Scotland	62
Fabián Gómez	Argentina	418
Branden Grace	South Africa	52
Emiliano Grillo	Argentina	270
Peter Hanson	Sweden	43
David Hearn	Canada	142
Michael Hendry	New Zealand	214
Ryo Ishikawa	Japan	110
Miguel Ángel Jiménez	Spain	47
Roope Kakko	Finland	219
Maximilian Kieffer	Germany	260
Espen Kofstad	Norway	319
Mikko Korhonen	Finland	334
Matt Kuchar	United States	7
Anirban Lahiri	India	141
Martin Laird	Scotland	79
Antonio Lascuña	Philippines	316
Liang Wenchong	China	104
José-Filipe Lima	Portugal	217
Shane Lowry	Ireland	75
Matteo Manassero	Italy	38
Stuart Manley	Wales	346
Graeme McDowell	Ireland	12
Francesco Molinari	Italy	37
Thorbjørn Olesen	Denmark	58
Prayad Marksaeng	Thailand	168
Angelo Que	Philippines	285
Alexandre Rocha	Brazil	408
Ricardo Santos	Portugal	216
Adam Scott	Australia	2
Siddikur Rahman	Bangladesh	172
Marcel Siem	Germany	83
Vijay Singh	Fiji	128
Tim Sluiter	Netherlands	404
Kevin Streelman	United States	46
Hideto Tanihara	Japan	134
Mark Tullo	Chile	384
Bernd Wiesberger	Austria	56
Tim Wilkinson	New Zealand	308
Danny Willett	England	114
Chris Wood	England	71
Wu Ashun	China	162

== Final leaderboards ==
=== Individual competition ===
Place	Player	Country	Score	To par	Money (US$)
1	Jason Day	Australia	68-70-66-70=274	−10	1,200,000
2	Thomas Bjørn	Denmark	66-68-71-71=276	−8	760,000
3	Adam Scott	Australia	75-68-68-66=277	−7	490,000
4	Matt Kuchar	United States	71-68-68-71=278	−6	340,000
T5	Kiradech Aphibarnrat	Thailand	71-70-70-70=281	−3	270,000
T5	Ryo Ishikawa	Japan	71-71-70-69=281	−3	270,000
7	Hideto Tanihara	Japan	72-67-71-72=282	−2	240,000
T8	David Hearn	Canada	70-71-71-71=283	−1	197,500
T8	Stuart Manley	Wales	67-72-72-72=283	−1	197,500
T8	Francesco Molinari	Italy	75-67-66-75=283	−1	197,500
T8	Kevin Streelman	United States	66-69-74-74=283	−1	197,500

=== Team competition ===
Place	Country	Score	To par	Money (US$)
1	Australia	143-138-134-136=551	−17	600,000
2	United States	137-137-142-145=561	−7	300,000
T3	Denmark	137-140-147-139=563	−5	50,000
T3	Japan	143-138-141-141=563	−5	50,000
5	Canada	141-144-141-144=570	+2	0
6	South Africa	147-141-145-139=572	+4	0
T7	France	145-140-145-143=573	+5	0
T7	Germany	144-145-139-145=573	+5	0
9	Thailand	143-142-143-147=575	+7	0
10	Scotland	141-143-146-146=576	+8	0
