= Charles Tour seasons =

This page lists all Charles Tour (currently titled as the Summerset Charles Tour for sponsorship reasons) seasons from its inaugural season in 2008.

Since its inception, all tournaments on the Charles Tour schedule have been played in New Zealand.

== 2026 season ==
=== Schedule ===
The following table lists official events during the 2026 season.

Date	Tournament	Location	Purse (NZ$)	Winner (Note: The number in brackets after each winner's name is the number of Charles Tour events they had won up to and including that tournament.)
13 Feb	Race to Tieke	Waikato	100,000	(New Zealand) Denzel Ieremia (2)
22 Mar	Brian Green Property Group NZ Super 6s	Manawatū-Whanganui	30,000	(New Zealand) Kerry Mountcastle (3)
3 May	Autex Muriwai Open	Auckland	110,000	(New Zealand) Tyler Wood (2)
10 May	Unlimit Taranaki Open	Taranaki	60,000	(New Zealand) Dominic Barson (2)
20 Sep	Chrisities Flooring Mount Open	Bay of Plenty	60,000	(New Zealand) Jayden Ford (2)
27 Sep	Carrus Tauranga Open	Bay of Plenty	50,000	(New Zealand) Tim Wilkinson (1)
20 Dec	iHire Invercargill Open	Southland	50,000	

== 2025 season ==
=== Schedule ===
The following table lists official events during the 2025 season.

Date	Tournament	Location	Purse (NZ$)	Winner
14 Feb	Race to Tieke	Waikato	100,000	(New Zealand) Michael Hendry (10)
16 Mar	Brian Green Property Group NZ Super 6s	Manawatū-Whanganui	60,000	(New Zealand) Jake Meenhorst (1)
6 Apr	New Zealand Stroke Play Championship	Wellington	50,000	(New Zealand) Tyler Wood (1)
13 Apr	Autex Muriwai Open	Auckland	100,000	(New Zealand) Mark Brown (6)
21 Sep	Christies Flooring Mount Open	Bay of Plenty	60,000	(New Zealand) Cooper Moore (1)
28 Sep	Carrus Tauranga Open	Bay of Plenty	50,000	(New Zealand) Josh Geary (11)
10 Oct	Club Car Pegasus Classic	Waimakariri	50,000	(New Zealand) Yuki Miya (a) (1)
26 Oct	TSB Taranaki Open	Taranaki	50,000	(New Zealand) Josh Geary (12)

=== Order of Merit ===
The Order of Merit was based on tournament results during the season, calculated using a points-based system.

Position	Player	Points
1	(New Zealand) Josh Geary	1,643
2	(New Zealand) Jake Meenhorst	1,051
3	(New Zealand) Yuki Miya (a)	1,038
4	(New Zealand) Tyler Wood	804
5	(New Zealand) Kerry Mountcastle	712

== 2024 season ==
=== Schedule ===
The following table lists official events during the 2024 season.

Date	Tournament	Location	Purse (NZ$)	Winner
16 Feb	Race to Tieke	Waikato	100,000	(New Zealand) Harry Hillier (1)
10 Mar	Wallace Development New Zealand PGA Championship	Hawke's Bay	100,000	(New Zealand) Pieter Zwart (2)
17 Mar	New Zealand Stroke Play Championship	Wellington	50,000	(New Zealand) Robby Turnbull (a) (1)
7 Apr	Brian Green Property Group NZ Super 6s	Manawatū-Whanganui	55,000	(New Zealand) Tyler Hodge (1)
14 Apr	Autex Muriwai Open	Auckland	80,000	(New Zealand) Sam Jones (3)
22 Sep	Christies Flooring Mount Open	Bay of Plenty	60,000	(New Zealand) Josh Geary (9)
29 Sep	Carrus Tauranga Open	Bay of Plenty	50,000	(New Zealand) Josh Geary (10)
27 Oct	TSB Taranaki Open	Taranaki	50,000	(New Zealand) Mark Brown (5)

=== Order of Merit ===
The Order of Merit was based on tournament results during the season, calculated using a points-based system.

Position	Player	Points
1	(New Zealand) Josh Geary	1,662
2	(New Zealand) Mark Brown	1,041
3	(New Zealand) Jayden Ford	1,001
4	(New Zealand) Tyler Hodge	976
5	(New Zealand) Robby Turnbull (a)	888

== 2023 season ==
=== Schedule ===
The following table lists official events during the 2023 season.

Date	Tournament	Location	Purse (NZ$)	Winner
29 Jan	Wallace Developments Hastings Open	Hawke's Bay	50,000	(New Zealand) Harry Bateman (2)
19 Feb	Brian Green Property Group NZ Super 6s Manawatu	Manawatū-Whanganui	55,000	(New Zealand) Jordan Loof (1)
~~19 Mar~~	Renaissance Brewing NZ Stroke Play Championship	Hawke's Bay	–	Cancelled (Note: Cancelled due to Cyclone Gabrielle.)
16 Apr	Autex Muriwai Open	Auckland	70,000	(New Zealand) Sam Jones (a) (2)
24 Sep	Christies Floorings Mount Open	Bay of Plenty	50,000	(New Zealand) Jayden Ford (a) (1)
1 Oct	Carrus Tauranga Open	Bay of Plenty	50,000	(New Zealand) Josh Geary (7)
15 Oct	DVS Clearwater Open	Canterbury	50,000	(New Zealand) Michael Hendry (9)
22 Oct	TSB Taranaki Open	Taranaki	50,000	(New Zealand) Josh Geary (8)

=== Order of Merit ===
The Order of Merit was based on tournament results during the season, calculated using a points-based system.

Position	Player	Points
1	(New Zealand) Josh Geary	1,586
2	(New Zealand) Tyler Hodge	1,007
3	(New Zealand) Sam Jones (a)	865
4	(New Zealand) Jordan Loof	862
5	(New Zealand) Harry Bateman	736

== 2022 season ==
=== Schedule ===
The following table lists official events during the 2022 season.

Date	Tournament	Location	Purse (NZ$)	Winner
~~27 Feb~~	Brian Green Property Group NZ Super 6 Manawatu	Manawatū-Whanganui	–	Cancelled
20 Mar	Renaissance Brewing NZ Stroke Play Championship	Canterbury	50,000	(New Zealand) Josh Geary (5)
24 Apr	Autex Muriwai Open	Auckland	60,000	(New Zealand) Kazuma Kobori (a) (1)
25 Sep	Christies Floorings Mount Open	Bay of Plenty	50,000	(New Zealand) Mako Thompson (a) (1)
2 Oct	Carrus Tauranga Open	Bay of Plenty	50,000	(New Zealand) Sam Jones (a) (1)
16 Oct	DVS Clearwater Open	Canterbury	50,000	(New Zealand) Josh Geary (6)
23 Oct	Taranaki Open	Taranaki	50,000	(New Zealand) Michael Hendry (8)

=== Order of Merit ===
The Order of Merit was based on tournament results during the season, calculated using a points-based system.

Position	Player	Points
1	(New Zealand) Sam Jones (a)	1,585
2	(New Zealand) Josh Geary	1,505
3	(New Zealand) Kazuma Kobori (a)	898
4	(New Zealand) Harry Bateman	890
5	(New Zealand) Mako Thompson (a)	728

== 2021 season ==
=== Schedule ===
The following table lists official events during the 2021 season.

Date	Tournament	Location	Purse (NZ$)	Winner
28 Feb	Brian Green Property Group NZ Super 6 Manawatu	Manawatū-Whanganui	65,000	(New Zealand) Kerry Mountcastle (a) (2)
21 Mar	Renaissance Brewing NZ Stroke Play Championship	Wellington	50,000	(New Zealand) Michael Hendry (7)
4 Apr	Clubroom Gulf Harbour Open	Auckland	50,000	(New Zealand) Ryan Fox (2)
11 Apr	Autex Muriwai Open	Auckland	60,000	(New Zealand) Ryan Fox (3)
~~10 Oct~~	Christies Floorings Mount Open	Bay of Plenty	–	Cancelled
~~17 Oct~~	Carrus Tauranga Open	Bay of Plenty	–	Cancelled
~~31 Oct~~	DVS Pegasus Open	Canterbury	–	Cancelled
~~7 Nov~~	Taranaki Open	Taranaki	–	Cancelled

=== Order of Merit ===
The Order of Merit was based on tournament results during the season, calculated using a points-based system.

Position	Player	Points
1	(New Zealand) Ryan Fox	1,000
2	(New Zealand) Josh Geary	808
3	(New Zealand) Kerry Mountcastle (a)	696
4	(New Zealand) Mark Brown	529
5	(New Zealand) Michael Hendry	500

== 2020 season ==
=== Schedule ===
The following table lists official events during the 2020 season.

Date	Tournament	Location	Purse (NZ$)	Winner
7 Mar	Brian Green Property Group NZ Super 6 Manawatu	Manawatū-Whanganui	60,000	(New Zealand) Daniel Hillier (2)
~~6 Apr~~	Barfoot and Thompson Akarana Open	Auckland	–	Cancelled
2 Aug	Autex Muriwai Open	Auckland	60,000	(New Zealand) James Hydes (a) (1)
4 Oct	DVS Pegasus Open	Canterbury	50,000	(New Zealand) Daniel Hillier (3)
11 Oct	Carrus Open	Bay of Plenty	50,000	(New Zealand) Luke Toomey (3)
18 Oct	Taranaki Open	Taranaki	40,000	(New Zealand) Kieran Muir (2)
13 Dec	Christies Floorings Mount Open	Bay of Plenty	50,000	(New Zealand) James Anstiss (3)

=== Order of Merit ===
The Order of Merit was based on tournament results during the season, calculated using a points-based system.

Position	Player	Points
1	(New Zealand) Daniel Hillier	1,557
2	(New Zealand) James Hydes (a)	1,012
3	(New Zealand) Luke Toomey	776
4	(New Zealand) Kieran Muir	661
5	(New Zealand) Josh Geary	516

== 2018–19 season ==
=== Schedule ===
The following table lists official events during the 2018–19 season.

Date	Tournament	Location	Purse (NZ$)	Winner
7 Oct	Harewood Open	Canterbury	50,000	(New Zealand) James Anstiss (1)
7 Apr	Barfoot and Thompson Akarana Open	Auckland	50,000	(New Zealand) Josh Geary (4)
14 Apr	Autex Muriwai Open	Auckland	60,000	(New Zealand) James Anstiss (2)
6 Oct	DVS Pegasus Open	Canterbury	50,000	(New Zealand) Luke Toomey (1)
13 Oct	Carrus Open	Bay of Plenty	50,000	(New Zealand) Luke Toomey (2)
15 Dec	Christies Floorings Mount Open	Bay of Plenty	50,000	(New Zealand) Denzel Ieremia (1)

=== Order of Merit ===
The Order of Merit was based on tournament results during the season, calculated using a points-based system.

Position	Player	Points
1	(New Zealand) James Anstiss	1,200
2	(New Zealand) Luke Toomey	1,100
3	(New Zealand) Josh Geary	637
4	(New Zealand) Fraser Wilkin	632
5	(New Zealand) Daniel Pearce	617

== 2017–18 season ==
=== Schedule ===
The following table lists official events during the 2017–18 season.

Date	Tournament	Location	Purse (NZ$)	Winner
8 Oct	John Jones Steel Harewood Open	Canterbury	50,000	(New Zealand) Harry Bateman (1)
15 Oct	Augusta Funds Management Ngamotu Classic	Taranaki	50,000	(New Zealand) Daniel Pearce (2)
8 Apr	Barfoot and Thompson Akarana Open	Auckland	50,000	(New Zealand) Daniel Pearce (3)
15 Apr	Autex Muriwai Open	Auckland	50,000	(New Zealand) Gareth Paddison (5)
22 Apr	Carrus Open	Bay of Plenty	50,000	(New Zealand) Kerry Mountcastle (a) (1)

=== Order of Merit ===
The Order of Merit was based on tournament results during the season, calculated using a points-based system.

Position	Player	Points
1	(New Zealand) Daniel Pearce	1,101
2	(New Zealand) Gareth Paddison	910
3	(New Zealand) James Anstiss	790
4	(New Zealand) Harry Bateman	750
5	(New Zealand) Kerry Mountcastle (a)	710

== 2016–17 season ==
=== Schedule ===
The following table lists official events during the 2016–17 season.

Date	Tournament	Location	Purse (NZ$)	Winner
2 Oct	Augusta Funds Management Taranaki Open	Taranaki	50,000	(New Zealand) Dominic Barson (1)
16 Oct	John Jones Steel Harewood Open	Canterbury	50,000	(New Zealand) Brad Shilton (2)
2 Apr	Barfoot and Thompson Akarana Open	Auckland	50,000	(New Zealand) Gareth Paddison (3)
9 Apr	Autex Muriwai Open	Auckland	50,000	(New Zealand) Gareth Paddison (4)
23 Apr	Carrus Open	Bay of Plenty	50,000	(New Zealand) Mark Brown (4)

=== Order of Merit ===
The Order of Merit was based on tournament results during the season, calculated using a points-based system.

Position	Player	Points
1	(New Zealand) Gareth Paddison	1,245
2	(New Zealand) Mark Brown	1,177
3	(New Zealand) Josh Geary	644
4	(New Zealand) Brad Shilton	610
5	(New Zealand) Dominic Barson	541

== 2015–16 season ==
=== Schedule ===
The following table lists official events during the 2015–16 season.

Date	Tournament	Location	Purse (NZ$)	Winner
20 Sep	Carrus Open	Bay of Plenty	50,000	(New Zealand) Mark Brown (3)
4 Oct	Augusta Funds Management Taranaki Open	Taranaki	50,000	(New Zealand) Joonsang Chung (1)
25 Oct	John Jones Steel Harewood Open	Canterbury	50,000	(New Zealand) Daniel Hillier (a) (1)
20 Mar	Lawnmaster Classic	Manawatū-Whanganui	50,000	(New Zealand) Michael Hendry (6)
17 Apr	Barfoot and Thompson Akarana Open	Auckland	50,000	(New Zealand) Kieran Muir (1)
1 May	Autex Muriwai Open	Auckland	50,000	(New Zealand) Pieter Zwart (1)

=== Order of Merit ===
The Order of Merit was based on tournament results during the season, calculated using a points-based system.

Position	Player	Points
1	(New Zealand) Jim Cusdin	773
2	(New Zealand) Kieran Muir	758
3	(New Zealand) Joonsang Chung	648
4	(New Zealand) Daniel Hillier (a)	646
5	(New Zealand) Pieter Zwart	633

== 2015 season ==
=== Schedule ===
The following table lists official events during the 2015 season.

Date	Tournament	Location	Purse (NZ$)	Winner
22 Mar	Lawnmaster Classic	Manawatū-Whanganui	40,000	(New Zealand) Michael Hendry (5)
26 Apr	Barfoot and Thompson Akarana Open	Auckland	40,000	(New Zealand) Gareth Paddison (2)
3 May	Autex Muriwai Open	Auckland	40,000	(New Zealand) Daniel Pearce (1)

== 2014 season ==
=== Schedule ===
The following table lists official events during the 2014 season.

Date	Tournament	Location	Purse (NZ$)	Winner
16 Feb	Lawnmaster Classic	Manawatū-Whanganui	40,000	(New Zealand) Doug Holloway (2)
20 Apr	Recreational Services Akarana Open	Auckland	40,000	(New Zealand) Josh Geary (3)
4 May	Ask Metro Muriwai Open	Auckland	40,000	(New Zealand) Ryan Fox (1)
28 Sep	Carrus Open	Bay of Plenty	40,000	(New Zealand) Mark Brown (2)
27 Oct	John Jones Steel Harewood Open	Canterbury	40,000	(New Zealand) Ryan Chisnall (a) (1)

== 2013 season ==
=== Schedule ===
The following table lists official events during the 2013 season.

Date	Tournament	Location	Purse (NZ$)	Winner
3 Feb	Lawnmaster Classic	Manawatū-Whanganui	40,000	(New Zealand) Grant Moorhead (1)
14 Apr	Taranaki Energy Open	Taranaki	40,000	(New Zealand) Fraser Wilkin (2)
12 May	Ask Metro Muriwai Open	Auckland	40,000	(New Zealand) Michael Hendry (4)
29 Sep	Carrus Open	Bay of Plenty	40,000	(New Zealand) Josh Geary (2)
28 Oct	John Jones Steel Harewood Open	Canterbury	40,000	(New Zealand) James Hamilton (1)

== 2012 season ==
=== Schedule ===
The following table lists official events during the 2012 season.

Date	Tournament	Location	Purse (NZ$)	Winner
15 Apr	Taranaki Energy Open	Taranaki	40,000	(Germany) David Klein (1)
6 May	Ask Metro Muriwai Open	Auckland	40,000	(New Zealand) Fraser Wilkin (a) (1)
30 Sep	Carrus Open	Bay of Plenty	40,000	(New Zealand) Mark Brown (1)
22 Oct	John Jones Steel Harewood Open	Canterbury	40,000	(New Zealand) Joshua Munn (a) (2)

== 2011 season ==
=== Schedule ===
The following table lists official events during the 2011 season.

Date	Tournament	Location	Purse (NZ$)	Winner
15 May	Ask Metro Muriwai Open	Auckland	40,000	(New Zealand) Joshua Munn (a) (1)
18 Sep	Carrus Open	Bay of Plenty	40,000	(New Zealand) Jim Cusdin (1)
2 Oct	Port Taranaki Open	Taranaki	40,000	(New Zealand) Joshua Carmichael (1)
23 Oct	United Fisheries Shirley Open	Canterbury	40,000	(New Zealand) Nick Gillespie (1)

== 2010 season ==
=== Schedule ===
The following table lists official events during the 2010 season.

Date	Tournament	Location	Purse (NZ$)	Winner
2 May	Carrus Tauranga Open	Bay of Plenty	40,000	(New Zealand) Ben Campbell (a) (1)
16 May	Rapid Labels Muriwai Open	Auckland	40,000	(New Zealand) Michael Hendry (3)
19 Sep	Wairakei Open	Waikato	40,000	(New Zealand) Gareth Paddison (1)
3 Oct	Port Taranaki Open	Taranaki	40,000	(New Zealand) Troy Ropiha (2)
25 Oct	Shirley Open	Canterbury	40,000	(New Zealand) Anthony Doyle (2)

== 2009 season ==
=== Schedule ===
The following table lists official events during the 2009 season.

Date	Tournament	Location	Purse (NZ$)	Winner
17 May	Carrus Tauranga Open	Bay of Plenty	40,000	(New Zealand) Michael Hendry (1)
20 Sep	Youthtown Wairakei Open	Waikato	40,000	(New Zealand) Brad Shilton (1)
4 Oct	Port Taranaki Open	Taranaki	40,000	(New Zealand) Michael Hendry (2)
26 Oct	Shirley Open	Canterbury	40,000	(New Zealand) Anthony Doyle (1)

== 2008 season ==
=== Schedule ===
The following table lists official events during the 2008 season.

Date	Tournament	Location	Purse (NZ$)	Winner
18 May	Carrus Tauranga Open	Bay of Plenty	40,000	(New Zealand) Josh Geary (1)
21 Sep	Youthtown Wairakei Open	Waikato	40,000	(New Zealand) Doug Holloway (1)
5 Oct	Bayleys Taranaki Open	Taranaki	40,000	(New Zealand) Troy Ropiha (a) (1)
27 Oct	Shirley Open	Canterbury	40,000	(New Zealand) Mark Purser (1)
