= Gareth Paddison =

New Zealand professional golfer

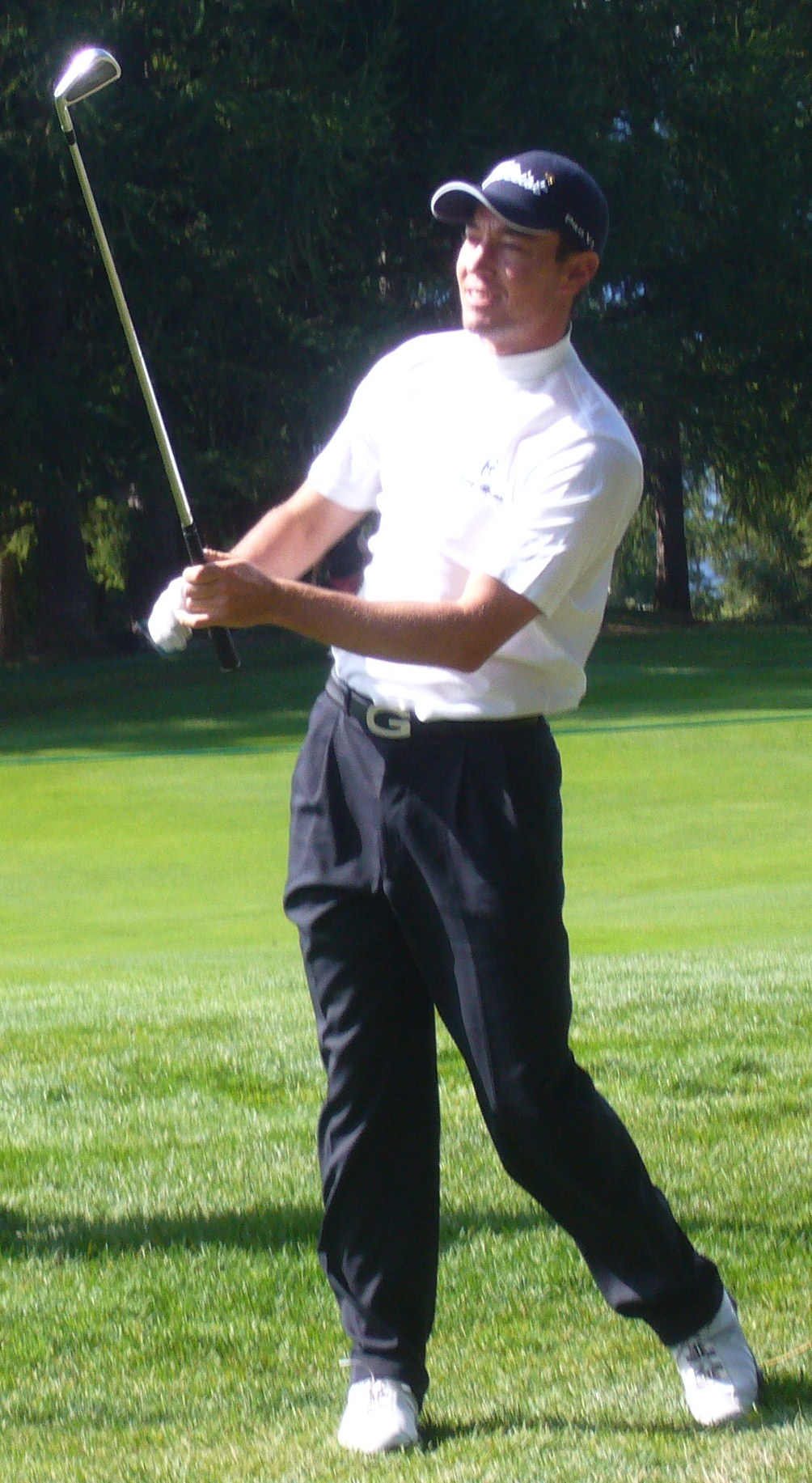
- Paddison at the 2008 Omega European Masters

Personal information
- Nationality: New Zealand
- Born: 13 May 1980 (age 46) Wellington, New Zealand
- Height: 6 ft 0 in (1.83 m)
- Weight: 163 lb (74 kg; 11.6 st)

Career
- Sport: Golf
- Turned professional: 2001
- Current tour: PGA Tour of Australasia
- Former tours: European Tour; Asian Tour; Challenge Tour; OneAsia Tour; Charles Tour
- Professional wins: 16

Number of wins by tour
- PGA Tour of Australasia: 4
- Challenge Tour: 1
- Other: 11

Achievements and awards
- Charles Tour Order of Merit winner: 2016–17

Gareth Paddison (born 13 May 1980) is a New Zealand professional golfer who plays on the PGA Tour of Australasia.

== Early life and amateur career ==
In 1980, Paddison was born in Wellington, New Zealand. His father, Garry, played for the New Zealand national football team in the 1970s.

Paddison won the New Zealand Amateur Stroke Play Championship and the Queensland Amateur Championship 1999 and the Canadian Amateur Championship in 2001. He also represented New Zealand at the 2000 Eisenhower Trophy.

== Professional career ==
In 2001, Paddison turned professional. He was named the Norman Von Nida Australasian PGA Tour Rookie of the Year in 2002 after he won the Scenic Circle Hotels Dunedin Classic. Paddison played on the Challenge Tour from 2002 to 2007. In 2002 he finished in third at the Izki Challenge de España. In 2004, he won the Victorian Open on the Von Nida Tour while finishing in a tie for second at the Skandia PGA Open on the Challenge Tour. He picked up his first win on the Challenge Tour in 2007 at the Open des Volcans. He earned his European Tour card for 2008 by going through qualifying school but he wasn't able to retain his card even though he recorded five top-25 finishes, and returned to the Challenge tour for 2009.

From 2010 Paddison played mostly on the PGA Tour of Australasia and the OneAsia tour. He won three tier-2 events on the Australasian Tour, the Queensland PGA Championship in 2011 and the Victorian PGA Championship in 2012 and 2014. His best finish on the OneAsia tour was when he was a runner-up in the 2015 GS Caltex Maekyung Open in Korea. He played on the Asian Tour in 2018, having secured a place through Q-school. He has won 5 times on the Charles Tour and won the Fiji Open in 2016.

== Amateur wins ==
- 1999 New Zealand Amateur Stroke Play Championship, Queensland Amateur Championship
- 2000 SBS Invitational
- 2001 Canadian Amateur Championship

== Professional wins (16) ==
=== PGA Tour of Australasia wins (4) ===
No.	Date	Tournament	Winning score	Margin of victory	Runner(s)-up
1	24 Mar 2002	Scenic Circle Hotels Dunedin Classic	−17 (66-69-68-64=267)	3 strokes	(Australia) Brad Andrews
2	27 Feb 2011	Cellarbrations Queensland PGA Championship	−18 (67-67-62-66=262)	2 strokes	(Australia) Terry Pilkadaris, (Australia) Kieran Pratt
3	19 Feb 2012	Adroit Insurance Group Victorian PGA Championship	−7 (67-69-67-74=277)	1 stroke	(Australia) Leighton Lyle
4	9 Feb 2014	Lexus of Blackburn Victorian PGA Championship (2)	−16 (67-68-66-71=272)	1 stroke	(New Zealand) Michael Hendry

=== Challenge Tour wins (1) ===
No.	Date	Tournament	Winning score	Margin of victory	Runner-up
1	8 Jul 2007	AGF-Allianz Open des Volcans – Challenge de France	−11 (70-69-68-66=273)	6 strokes	(Sweden) Leif Westerberg

=== Von Nida Tour wins (1) ===
No.	Date	Tournament	Winning score	Margin of victory	Runners-up
1	25 Jan 2004	Mitsubishi Motors Victorian Open	−12 (71-66-67=204)	5 strokes	(Australia) Richard Green, (Australia) Paul Sheehan

=== Charles Tour wins (5) ===
No.	Date	Tournament	Winning score	Margin of victory	Runner(s)-up
1	19 Sep 2010	Wairakei Open	−8 (74-67-67-72=280)	5 strokes	(New Zealand) James Betts (a), (New Zealand) Jared Pender
2	26 Apr 2015	Barfoot and Thompson Akarana Open	−16 (66-66-66-66=264)	4 strokes	(New Zealand) Joshua Munn (a)
3	2 Apr 2017	Barfoot and Thompson Akarana Open (2)	−18 (66-64-64-68=262)	Playoff	(New Zealand) Michael Hendry
4	9 Apr 2017	Autex Muriwai Open	−15 (64-69-69-71=273)	5 strokes	(New Zealand) Mark Brown
5	15 Apr 2018	Autex Muriwai Open (2)	−12 (70-67-71-68=276)	Playoff	(New Zealand) James Anstiss

=== Other wins (5) ===
- 2000 Waikato Strokeplay Championship
- 2016 Fiji Open
- 2019 Mondiale Omaha Beach Pro-Am
- 2020 Recreational Services Masterton Eketahuna Pro-Am
- 2023 Grove Mitre 10 Pupuke Pro-Am

== Team appearances ==
Amateur

- Nomura Cup (representing New Zealand): 1999
- Eisenhower Trophy (representing New Zealand): 2000
- Four Nations Cup (representing New Zealand): 2001
- Southern Cross Cup (representing New Zealand): 2001

Professional

- World Cup (representing New Zealand): 2011

== See also ==
- 2007 European Tour Qualifying School graduates
