= Daniel Hillier =

New Zealand professional golfer

Personal information
- Nationality: New Zealand
- Born: 26 July 1998 (age 28) Wellington, New Zealand
- Height: 6 ft 1 in (185 cm)

Career
- Sport: Golf
- Turned professional: 2019
- Current tours: PGA Tour; European Tour; PGA Tour of Australasia
- Former tours: Challenge Tour; Charles Tour
- Professional wins: 8
- Highest ranking: 74 (25 October 2026) (as of 15 November 2026)

Number of wins by tour
- European Tour: 1
- Asian Tour: 1
- PGA Tour of Australasia: 1
- Challenge Tour: 2
- Other: 4

Best results in major championships
- Masters Tournament: DNP
- PGA Championship: T26: 2026
- U.S. Open: CUT: 2019
- The Open Championship: T19: 2024

Achievements and awards
- Charles Tour Order of Merit winner: 2020
- European Tour Graduate of the Year: 2023

Daniel Hillier (born 26 July 1998) is a New Zealand professional golfer and European Tour player. He won the 2023 British Masters and the 2026 New Zealand Open.

== Amateur career ==
Hillier had a successful amateur career, winning the New Zealand Amateur twice, in 2015 and 2017. He won the Australian Boys' Amateur in 2016 and was twice winner of the New Zealand under-19 championship, in 2015 and 2016. Hillier was also twice winner of the Bledisloe Cup, in 2016 and 2018, as the leading amateur in the New Zealand Open, and was a co-medalist, with Cole Hammer, at the 2018 U.S. Amateur.

As a 17-year-old amateur, Hillier won the 2015 John Jones Steel Harewood Open on the Charles Tour. He beat Jim Cusdin by a stroke after finishing on 277, 11-under-par, with three birdies in his last five holes. He qualified for the 2019 U.S. Open through final qualifying at Walton Heath in England.

Hillier was part of the three-man New Zealand team in the 2018 Eisenhower Trophy in Ireland. The team led by three strokes after three rounds but faded on the final day and finished in fourth place behind Denmark, the United States and Spain. Hillier was tied for third place in the final individual standings with a score of 273, 17 under par.

== Professional career ==
Hillier turned professional in September 2019. In January 2020 he qualified for the PGA Tour of Australasia but after a few starts in early 2020, his year was affected by the COVID-19 pandemic and his appearances were largely limited to the Charles Tour. He had some success on that tour, winning two of the six events, the Brian Green Property Group NZ Super 6 Manawatu in March and the DVS Pegasus Open in October, and ending the year as the winner of the Order of Merit.

In 2021, Hillier qualified for the Open Championship after winning the final qualifying section at Notts Golf Club after rounds of 64 and 69, although he missed the cut in the championship itself. He played most of 2021 on the Challenge Tour, winning the Challenge Costa Brava in October, with a birdie at the final hole.

In July 2023, Hillier claimed his first European Tour win at the Betfred British Masters in England. He shot a final round 66 to win by two shots.

In 2025, he was runner-up at the Hero Dubai Desert Classic, a stroke behind Tyrrell Hatton. In 2026 he was runner-up at the Dubai Invitational and won the New Zealand Open, to break into the top-100 in the Official World Golf Ranking for the first time.

== Amateur wins ==
- 2015 New Zealand Amateur, New Zealand U19
- 2016 Australian Boys' Amateur, New Zealand U19
- 2017 Grant Clements Memorial Tournament, Wellington Stroke Play, New Zealand Amateur

== Professional wins (8) ==
=== European Tour wins (1) ===
No.	Date	Tournament	Winning score	Margin of victory	Runners-up
1	2 Jul 2023	Betfred British Masters	−10 (72-71-69-66=278)	2 strokes	(United States) Gunner Wiebe, (England) Oliver Wilson

=== Asian Tour wins (1) ===
No.	Date	Tournament	Winning score	Margin of victory	Runner-up
1	1 Mar 2026	New Zealand Open^{1}	−22 (63-68-64-67=262)	2 strokes	(Australia) Lucas Herbert

^{1}Co-sanctioned by the PGA Tour of Australasia

=== PGA Tour of Australasia wins (1) ===
No.	Date	Tournament	Winning score	Margin of victory	Runner-up
1	1 Mar 2026	New Zealand Open^{1}	−22 (63-68-64-67=262)	2 strokes	(Australia) Lucas Herbert

^{1}Co-sanctioned by the Asian Tour

=== Challenge Tour wins (2) ===
No.	Date	Tournament	Winning score	Margin of victory	Runner-up
1	22 Oct 2021	Challenge Costa Brava	−19 (71-67-62-65=265)	1 stroke	(Denmark) Marcus Helligkilde
2	25 Sep 2022	Swiss Challenge	−14 (68-70-72-64=274)	2 strokes	(France) Jeong-Weon Ko

=== Charles Tour wins (3) ===
No.	Date	Tournament	Winning score	Margin of victory	Runner-up
1	25 Oct 2015	John Jones Steel Harewood Open (as an amateur)	−11 (71-66-72-68=277)	1 stroke	(New Zealand) Jim Cusdin
2	7 Mar 2020	Brian Green Property Group NZ Super 6 Manawatu	+1 (25)	1 stroke	(New Zealand) Jang Hyun Lee (a)
3	4 Oct 2020	DVS Pegasus Open	−13 (66-70-72-67=275)	2 strokes	(New Zealand) Mako Thompson (a)

=== Other wins (1) ===
No.	Date	Tournament	Winning score	Margin of victory	Runner-up
1	2 Apr 2023	Fruehauf Trailers Omaha Beach Pro-Am	−8 (68-62=130)	1 stroke	(South Korea) Kang Dong-woo

== Results in major championships ==
Results not in chronological order in 2020.

Tournament	2019	2020	2021	2022	2023	2024	2025	2026
Masters Tournament								
PGA Championship								T26
U.S. Open	CUT							
The Open Championship		NT	CUT		CUT	T19	CUT	CUT

Did not play

CUT = missed the half-way cut
"T" = tied
NT = no tournament due to COVID-19 pandemic

== Team appearances ==
Amateur

- Sloan Morpeth Trophy (representing New Zealand): 2016
- Nomura Cup (representing Australia): 2017
- Bonallack Trophy (representing Asia/Pacific): 2018 (winners)
- Eisenhower Trophy (representing New Zealand): 2018

== See also ==
- 2022 Challenge Tour graduates
- 2026 Race to Dubai dual card winners
