= Mark Brown (golfer) =

New Zealand professional golfer ( born 1975)

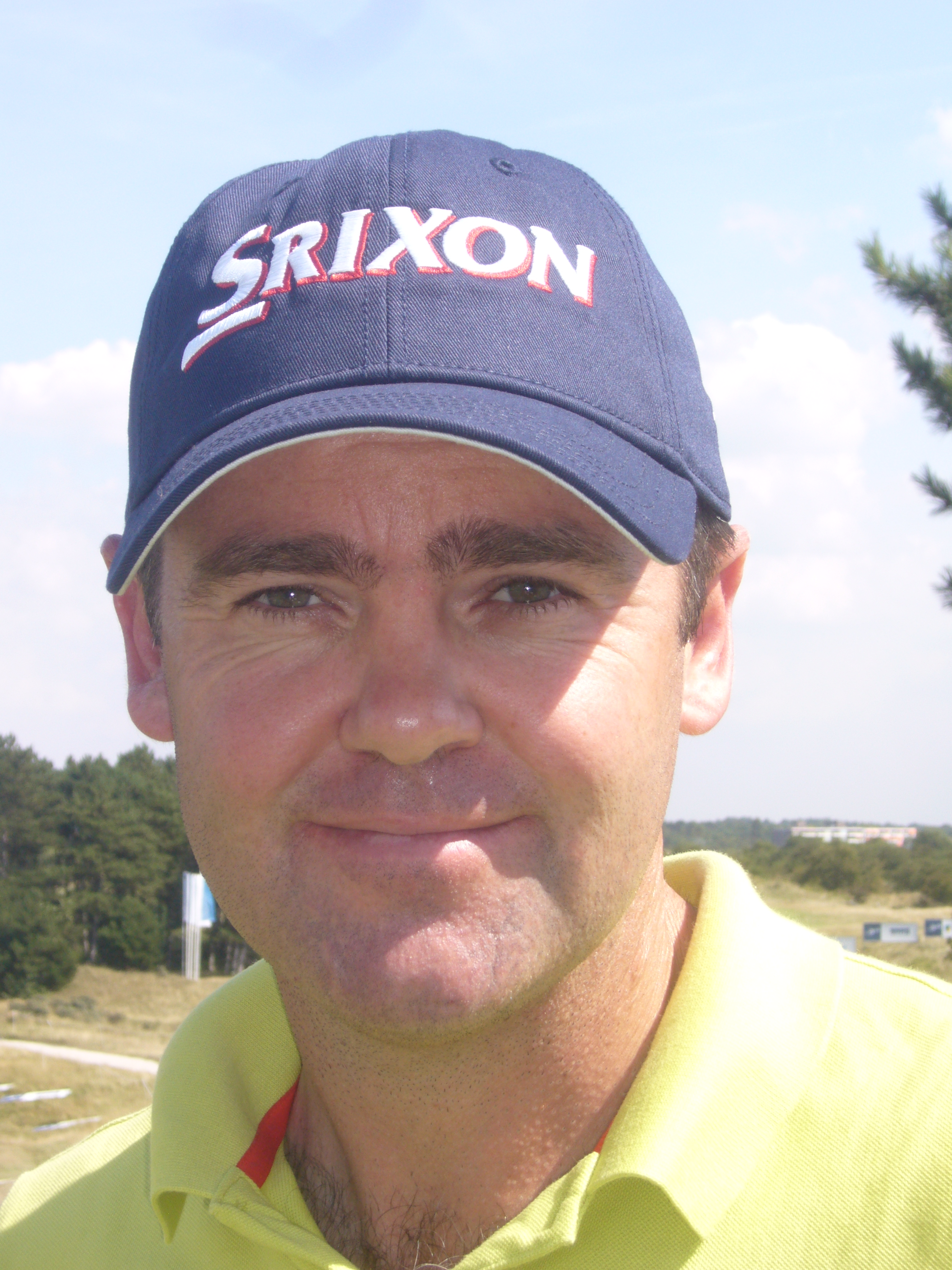

Personal information
- Nationality: New Zealand
- Born: 9 February 1975 (age 51) Lower Hutt, New Zealand
- Height: 1.84 m (6 ft 0 in)
- Weight: 78 kg (172 lb; 12.3 st)

Career
- Sport: Golf
- Turned professional: 1996
- Current tours: PGA Tour of Australasia; Charles Tour; European Senior Tour
- Former tours: European Tour; Asian Tour; Canadian Tour; OneAsia Tour
- Professional wins: 10
- Highest ranking: 57 (27 April 2008)

Number of wins by tour
- European Tour: 1
- Asian Tour: 2
- PGA Tour of Australasia: 1
- European Senior Tour: 1
- Other: 7

Best results in major championships
- Masters Tournament: DNP
- PGA Championship: T24: 2008
- U.S. Open: DNP
- The Open Championship: T44: 2013

Achievements and awards
- PGA Tour of Australasia Order of Merit winner: 2008

Mark Brown (born 9 February 1975) is a New Zealand professional golfer. He was particularly successful in 2007 and 2008. In early 2008, he won the SAIL Open Golf Championship and the Johnnie Walker Classic in successive weeks and was in the world top 100 for much of 2008. He played on the European Tour from 2008 to 2011.

== Early life ==
Brown was born in Lower Hutt.

== Professional career ==
Brown had played golf on the PGA Tour of Australasia, the Canadian Tour, and the Asian Tour without much success until 2007 when he had four top-ten finishes on the Asian Tour and finished 15th on the Order of Merit.

In 2008, he won his first Asian Tour event at the SAIL Open Golf Championship at Jaypee Greens in India. The following week he won the Johnnie Walker Classic, which was also held in India and was co-sanctioned by the European Tour and the PGA Tour of Australasia. This victory propelled Brown to 64th in the Official World Golf Ranking and he became the highest ranked golfer from New Zealand. He finished 2008 by winning the PGA Tour of Australasia's Order of Merit.

Brown played on the European Tour from 2008 to 2011 but lost his place on the tour after 2011. Apart from his win in 2008, his best finish was to be tied for 3rd place in the 2009 Volvo China Open. From 2012 he played mostly on the PGA Tour of Australasia and the OneAsia tour. He was runner-up in the 2012 New Zealand PGA Championship and the 2014 New Zealand Open. He has won four times on the Charles Tour, all his wins coming in the Carrus Open at the Tauranga Golf Club in Tauranga. He twice scored 59 in the Carrus Open, both in the second round. He first achieved it in 2014, when he won the event, and repeated the feat in 2018, when he eventually finished as a runner-up.

== Professional wins (10) ==
=== European Tour wins (1) ===
| No. | Date | Tournament | Winning score | Margin of victory | Runners-up |
|---|---|---|---|---|---|
| 1 | 2 Mar 2008 | Johnnie Walker Classic^{1} | −18 (71-68-64-67=270) | 3 strokes | (Australia) Greg Chalmers, (Japan) Taichiro Kiyota, (Australia) Scott Strange |

^{1}Co-sanctioned by the Asian Tour and the PGA Tour of Australasia

=== Asian Tour wins (2) ===
| No. | Date | Tournament | Winning score | Margin of victory | Runners-up |
|---|---|---|---|---|---|
| 1 | 23 Feb 2008 | SAIL Open Golf Championship | −14 (69-69-67-69=274) | 4 strokes | (Australia) Scott Hend, (South Korea) Noh Seung-yul, (India) Jyoti Randhawa |
| 2 | 2 Mar 2008 | Johnnie Walker Classic^{1} | −18 (71-68-64-67=270) | 3 strokes | (Australia) Greg Chalmers, (Japan) Taichiro Kiyota, (Australia) Scott Strange |

^{1}Co-sanctioned by the European Tour and the PGA Tour of Australasia

=== PGA Tour of Australasia wins (1) ===
| No. | Date | Tournament | Winning score | Margin of victory | Runners-up |
|---|---|---|---|---|---|
| 1 | 2 Mar 2008 | Johnnie Walker Classic^{1} | −18 (71-68-64-67=270) | 3 strokes | (Australia) Greg Chalmers, (Japan) Taichiro Kiyota, (Australia) Scott Strange |

^{1}Co-sanctioned by the European Tour and the Asian Tour

=== Charles Tour wins (6) ===
| No. | Date | Tournament | Winning score | Margin of victory | Runner(s)-up |
|---|---|---|---|---|---|
| 1 | 30 Sep 2012 | Carrus Open | −17 (64-71-66-62=263) | 4 strokes | (New Zealand) Troy Rohipa |
| 2 | 28 Sep 2014 | Carrus Open (2) | −17 (68-59-66-70=263) | 2 strokes | (New Zealand) Doug Holloway |
| 3 | 20 Sep 2015 | Carrus Open (3) | −14 (67-65-66-68=266) | 1 stroke | (New Zealand) Jim Cusdin, (New Zealand) Joshua Munn (a) |
| 4 | 23 Apr 2017 | Carrus Open (4) | −18 (64-66-67-65=262) | 2 strokes | (New Zealand) Harry Bateman, (New Zealand) Gareth Paddison |
| 5 | 27 Oct 2024 | TSB Taranaki Open | −6 (68-72-73-69=282) | Playoff | (New Zealand) Josh Geary |
| 6 | 13 Apr 2025 | Autex Muriwai Open | −15 (65-66-73-69=273) | 1 stroke | (New Zealand) Kerry Mountcastle |

=== Golf Tour of New Zealand wins (1) ===
- 2006 Olex Taranaki Open

=== European Senior Tour wins (1) ===
| No. | Date | Tournament | Winning score | Margin of victory | Runners-up |
|---|---|---|---|---|---|
| 1 | 13 Jul 2025 | Swiss Seniors Open | −15 (66-65-64=195) | 2 strokes | (England) Robert Coles, (South Africa) Keith Horne, (England) Van Phillips |

== Results in major championships ==
| Tournament | 2008 | 2009 | 2010 | 2011 | 2012 | 2013 |
|---|---|---|---|---|---|---|
| Masters Tournament | | | | | | |
| U.S. Open | | | | | | |
| The Open Championship | | CUT | | | | T44 |
| PGA Championship | T24 | | | | | |

Did not play

CUT = missed the half-way cut
"T" = tied

== Results in World Golf Championships ==
| Tournament | 2008 | 2009 |
|---|---|---|
| Match Play | | |
| Championship | 76 | T46 |
| Invitational | 80 | |
| Champions | | T31 |

Did not play

"T" = Tied
Note that the HSBC Champions did not become a WGC event until 2009.

== Team appearances ==
Amateur

- Eisenhower Trophy (representing New Zealand): 1994

Professional

- World Cup (representing New Zealand): 2008, 2018
