= Josh Geary =

New Zealand professional golfer (born 1984)

Personal information
- Nationality: New Zealand
- Born: 12 November 1984 (age 42) Invercargill, New Zealand
- Height: 1.77 m (5 ft 9 1/2 in)

Career
- Sport: Golf
- Turned professional: 2007
- Current tours: PGA Tour of Australasia; Charles Tour
- Former tours: European Tour; Web.com Tour; Challenge Tour; Canadian Tour; OneAsia Tour; China Tour
- Professional wins: 22

Number of wins by tour
- PGA Tour of Australasia: 2
- Other: 20

Best results in major championships
- Masters Tournament: DNP
- PGA Championship: DNP
- U.S. Open: DNP
- The Open Championship: CUT: 2009

Achievements and awards
- Charles Tour Order of Merit winner: 2023, 2024, 2025

Josh Geary (born 12 November 1984) is a New Zealand professional golfer who plays on the PGA Tour of Australasia.

== Professional career ==
Geary turned professional in 2007 and played primarily on the Canadian Tour until 2010. He won the Saskatchewan Open in 2008, and was runner-up at the Economical Insurance Group Seaforth Country Classic in 2010, two shots behind Kent Eger. He was also a runner-up in the 2009 New Zealand PGA Championship and 4th in the New Zealand Open the following week, events co-sanctioned with the Nationwide Tour.

In 2011, Geary played a full season on the Nationwide Tour. In 25 starts, his best finish was tied for 5th place in the Midwest Classic. He was third in the New Zealand Open at the end of the year. Geary played five events at the start of the 2012 Nationwide Tour season but missed the cut on each occasion. From 2012 to early 2015, Geary played mostly on the PGA Tour of Australasia and the OneAsia Tour. He tied for third place in the 2013 New Zealand PGA Championship and won the Western Australian Open later that year. He lost in a playoff for the 2014 Mazda New South Wales Open and was a joint runner-up in the 2015 New Zealand PGA Championship.

In 2015, Geary played in the second season of the PGA Tour China. He won three tournaments and finished second in the Order of Merit to gain a place on the Web.com Tour for 2016. At the start of 2016, he was again a joint runner-up in the New Zealand PGA Championship. Geary played 16 events on the Web.com Tour but only the cut 5 times with a best place finish of 6th in the Servientrega Championship.

Geary played on the China Tour in 2017, winning the Yulongwan Yunnan Open. At the end of 2017, he finished in 9th place in the European Tour Q-school to gain a place on the tour for 2018. Geary played 22 events on the 2018 European Tour but only has one top-10 finish and was 177th in the Order of Merit. At the end of 2018, he again played well in the European Tour Q-school, missing out on qualification for the main tour by a single stroke but gaining a place on the Challenge Tour for 2019. Geary started 2019 with a runner-up finish in the New Zealand Open and was also runner-up in the D+D Real Slovakia Challenge.

In February 2025, Geary won his second PGA Tour of Australasia event and first in over 11 years. He shot a final round 78 to win the Vic Open by four shots over Connor McKinney.

== Professional wins (22) ==
=== PGA Tour of Australasia wins (2) ===
No.	Date	Tournament	Winning score	To par	Margin of victory	Runner-up
1	13 Oct 2013	John Hughes/Nexus Risk Services WA Open	73-68-67-65=273	−15	5 strokes	(Australia) Kristopher Mueck
2	9 Feb 2025	Vic Open	64-65-68-78=275	−13	4 strokes	(Australia) Connor McKinney

PGA Tour of Australasia playoff record (0–1)

No.	Year	Tournament	Opponent	Result
1	2014	Mazda NSW Open	(Australia) Anthony Brown	Lost to birdie on second extra hole

=== Canadian Tour wins (1) ===
No.	Date	Tournament	Winning score	To par	Margin of victory	Runner-up
1	6 Jul 2008	Saskatchewan Open	67-67-71-66=271	−17	1 stroke	(United States) George Bradford

=== China Tour wins (4) ===
No.	Date	Tournament	Winning score	To par	Margin of victory	Runner-up
1	5 Apr 2015	Buick Open	73-70-69-68=280	−8	1 stroke	(South Korea) Wang Jeung-hun
2	31 May 2015	Lanhai Open	67-72-68-69=276	−12	1 stroke	(South Korea) Wang Jeung-hun
3	4 Oct 2015	Yulongwan Yunnan Open	66-65-64-71=266	−22	1 stroke	(Thailand) Gunn Charoenkul
4	13 Aug 2017	Yulongwan Yunnan Open (2)	66-63-66-64=259	−25	7 strokes	(Thailand) Gunn Charoenkul

=== Charles Tour wins (12) ===
No.	Date	Tournament	Winning score	To par	Margin of victory	Runner(s)-up
1	18 May 2008	Carrus Tauranga Open	68-67-67-64=266	−14	Playoff	(New Zealand) Grant Moorhead
2	29 Sep 2013	Carrus Open (2)	66-67-64-65=262	−18	8 strokes	(New Zealand) Richard Lee, (New Zealand) Troy Ropiha
3	20 Apr 2014	Recreational Services Akarana Open	62-64-70=196	−14	2 strokes	(New Zealand) Peter Lee
4	7 Apr 2019	Barfoot and Thompson Akarana Open (2)	63-64-67-68=262	−18	2 strokes	(New Zealand) Michael Hendry, (South Korea) Kang Dong-woo
5	20 Mar 2022	Renaissance Brewery NZ Stroke Play Championship	68-68-73-65=274	−14	1 stroke	(New Zealand) Sam Jones (a)
6	16 Oct 2022	DVS Clearwater Open	68-68-69=205	−11	2 strokes	(New Zealand) Sam Jones (a), (South Korea) Kang Dong-woo
7	1 Oct 2023	Carrus Tauranga Open (3)	63-67-64-71=265	−15	1 stroke	(New Zealand) Tyler Hodge
8	22 Oct 2023	TSB Taranaki Open	65-71-70-66=272	−16	6 strokes	(New Zealand) Mark Brown, (New Zealand) Tyler Hodge
9	22 Sep 2024	Christies Flooring Mount Open	72-67-67-66=272	−12	2 strokes	(New Zealand) Robby Turnbull (a)
10	29 Sep 2024	Carrus Tauranga Open (4)	67-62-65-65=259	−21	5 strokes	(New Zealand) Jayden Ford (a)
11	28 Sep 2025	Carrus Tauranga Open (5)	62-66-63-60=251	−29	12 strokes	(New Zealand) James Hydes
12	26 Oct 2025	TSB Taranaki Open (2)	71-70-70-71=282	−6	2 strokes	(New Zealand) Mitchell Kale

=== Golf Tour of New Zealand wins (1) ===
- 2006 Carrus Tauranga Open (as an amateur)

=== Other wins (2) ===
No.	Date	Tournament	Winning score	To par	Margin of victory	Runner-up
1	24 Feb 2023	Jennian Homes Brian Perry Classic	67-67=134	−8	3 strokes	(New Zealand) Charlie Smail
2	16 Dec 2023	The Hills Invitational Pro-Am	69-66=135	−9	3 strokes	(New Zealand) Nick Voke

== Results in major championships ==
Tournament	2009
The Open Championship	CUT

CUT = missed the halfway cut
Note: Geary only played in The Open Championship.

== Team appearances ==
Amateur

- Eisenhower Trophy (representing New Zealand): 2004, 2006
- Nomura Cup (representing New Zealand): 2005
- Bonallack Trophy (representing Asia/Pacific): 2006

== See also ==
- 2017 European Tour Qualifying School graduates
