= Charles Tour =

Golf tour in New Zealand

- Current season, competition or edition: 2026 Charles Tour
- Formerly: Jennian Homes Charles Tour
- Sport: Golf
- Founded: 2008
- Founder: Golf New Zealand; New Zealand PGA
- First season: 2008
- Country: Based in New Zealand
- Most titles: Order of Merit titles: (New Zealand) Josh Geary (2); Tournament wins: (New Zealand) Josh Geary (12)
- Related competitions: Golf Tour of New Zealand

The Charles Tour, currently titled as the Summerset Charles Tour for sponsorship reasons, is a New Zealand-based golf tour run by Golf New Zealand and the New Zealand PGA. It is named after Bob Charles. The tour was founded in 2008, replacing the Golf Tour of New Zealand which had run from 2004 to 2007.

In September 2015, the tour undertook a title sponsorship by New Zealand-based home building company Jennian Homes, being renamed as the Jennian Homes Charles Tour. In February 2026, the tour undertook a new title sponsorship with Summerset Retirement Villages, being renamed as the Summerset Charles Tour.

With the exception of the Super 6s event, tournaments are over 72 holes, played over 4 days. They feature a mixture of professionals and amateurs, men and women. There have been between four and six tournaments each year. Michael Hendry has the most wins on the tour, with nine between 2009 and 2023.

== Jennian Homes Trophy ==
The Jennian Homes Trophy was first contested in 2015–16, and was won by Jim Cusdin, despite not winning during the season. The 2016–17 trophy was won by Gareth Paddison. Daniel Pearce won twice in the 2017–18 and led the Order of Merit. In 2018 it was decided to change the season to match the calendar year. The 2018–19 season covered the period from mid-2018 to the end of 2019, the Jennian Homes Trophy being won by James Anstiss. Daniel Hillier won the 2020 Order of Merit, covering the 2020 calendar year. Ryan Fox took the trophy in 2021, winning two of the tour events in a reduced season. Sam Jones won in 2022 with one win and a number of high finishes. With two victories and two runner-up finishes, Josh Geary won the trophy in 2023.

== Order of Merit winners ==
Season	Winner	Points
2025	(New Zealand) Josh Geary (3)	1,643
2024	(New Zealand) Josh Geary (2)	1,662
2023	(New Zealand) Josh Geary	1,586
2022	(New Zealand) Sam Jones (a)	1,585
2021	(New Zealand) Ryan Fox	1,000
2020	(New Zealand) Daniel Hillier	1,557
2018–19	(New Zealand) James Anstiss	1,200
2017–18	(New Zealand) Daniel Pearce	1,101
2016–17	(New Zealand) Gareth Paddison	1,245
2015–16	(New Zealand) Jim Cusdin	773
2015	No Order of Merit awarded	
2014	No Order of Merit awarded	
2013	No Order of Merit awarded	
2012	No Order of Merit awarded	
2011	No Order of Merit awarded	
2010	No Order of Merit awarded	
2009	No Order of Merit awarded	
2008	No Order of Merit awarded	

== See also ==
- New Zealand Open
