= Johnnie Walker Classic =

Tournament information
- Location: Perth, Australia
- Established: 1990
- Course: The Vines
- Par: 72
- Length: 7,103 yards (6,495 m)
- Tours: European Tour; PGA Tour of Australasia; Asian Tour
- Format: Stroke play
- Prize fund: £1,250,000
- Month played: February
- Final year: 2009

Tournament record score
- Aggregate: 259 Ernie Els (2003)
- To par: −29 as above

Final champion
- (New Zealand) Danny Lee
- Location in Australia Location in Western Australia

The Johnnie Walker Classic was a European Tour golf tournament which was played in the Asia-Pacific region. Johnnie Walker is a brand name and the owners have a long history of tournament sponsorship. They also sponsored the Johnnie Walker Championship at Gleneagles which was a European Tour event played in Scotland.

The event was originally called the Johnnie Walker Asian Classic. There was a tournament already called the Johnnie Walker Classic in Australia, but when that event ceased in 1992, the word Asian was dropped from the name.

== History ==
In 1989 Johnnie Walker sponsored the Hong Kong Open, and it was decided to establish an additional tournament which it would sponsor on an ongoing basis. This tournament was called the Johnnie Walker Asian Classic, and was first staged in Hong Kong in 1990. It later evolved into a traveling event that was primarily utilized by its sponsor as a marketing strategy in the Asia Pacific region. In 1992 it became the first event to be sanctioned by the European Tour in East Asia (the Dubai Desert Classic was the first in Asia as a whole).

In 1993 the word Asian was dropped from the title. In 2005 the tournament was held in China for the first time, as part of the European Tour's push into China, which saw four events held in mainland China and one in Hong Kong in the 2005 season. The location of the tournament changes every year.

The tournament was co-sanctioned with the PGA Tour of Australasia from 1996, and by the Asian Tour from 1999.

In 2005 the tri-sanctioned event had a field consisting of 60 European Tour players, 60 Asian Tour players, 28 PGA Tour of Australasia players, and 8 sponsors' invitees. The prize fund was £1,250,000. This amount is large by Asian and Australasian Tour standards, but not by European Tour or PGA Tour standards. However the tournament attracts a number of the World's leading players each year by paying them large appearance fees.

Nine of the first fourteen editions were won by players who have topped the Official World Golf Ranking at some point in their career (Faldo, Els and Woods twice each; Woosnam, Norman and Couples once each).

== Winners ==
Year	Tour(s) (Note: ANZ − PGA Tour of Australasia; ASA − Asian Tour; EUR − European Tour.)	Winner	Score	To par	Margin of victory	Runner(s)-up	Venue
Johnnie Walker Classic
2009	ANZ, ASA, EUR	(New Zealand) Danny Lee (a)	271	−17	1 stroke	(Chile) Felipe Aguilar (Japan) Hiroyuki Fujita (England) Ross McGowan	The Vines, Australia
2008	ANZ, ASA, EUR	(New Zealand) Mark Brown	270	−18	3 strokes	(Australia) Greg Chalmers (Japan) Taichiro Kiyota (Australia) Scott Strange	DLF, India
2007	ANZ, ASA, EUR	(South Africa) Anton Haig	275	−13	Playoff	(South Africa) Richard Sterne (England) Oliver Wilson	Blue Canyon, Thailand
2006	ANZ, ASA, EUR	(United States) Kevin Stadler	268	−20	2 strokes	(Australia) Nick O'Hern	The Vines, Australia
2005	ANZ, ASA, EUR	(Australia) Adam Scott	270	−18	3 strokes	(South Africa) Retief Goosen	Pine Valley, China
2004	ANZ, ASA, EUR	(Spain) Miguel Ángel Jiménez	271	−17	2 strokes	(Denmark) Thomas Bjørn (India) Jyoti Randhawa	Alpine Golf, Thailand
2003	ANZ, ASA, EUR	(South Africa) Ernie Els (2)	259	−29	10 strokes	(Australia) Stephen Leaney (Australia) Andre Stolz	Lake Karrinyup, Australia
2002	ANZ, ASA, EUR	(South Africa) Retief Goosen	274	−14	8 strokes	(Sweden) Pierre Fulke	Lake Karrinyup, Australia
2001: No tournament due to rescheduling from November to January
2000	ANZ, ASA, EUR	(United States) Tiger Woods (2)	263	−25	3 strokes	(Australia) Geoff Ogilvy	Alpine Golf, Thailand
1999	ANZ, ASA, EUR	(New Zealand) Michael Campbell	276	−12	1 stroke	(Australia) Geoff Ogilvy	Tashee, Taiwan
1998	ANZ, EUR	(United States) Tiger Woods	279	−9	Playoff	(South Africa) Ernie Els	Blue Canyon, Thailand
1997	ANZ, EUR	(South Africa) Ernie Els	278	−10	1 stroke	(Australia) Peter Lonard (New Zealand) Michael Long	Hope Island, Australia
1996	ANZ, EUR	(Wales) Ian Woosnam	272	−16	Playoff	(Scotland) Andrew Coltart	Tanah Merah, Singapore
1995	EUR	(United States) Fred Couples	277	−11	2 strokes	(Zimbabwe) Nick Price	The Orchard, Philippines
1994	EUR	(Australia) Greg Norman	277	−11	1 stroke	(United States) Fred Couples	Blue Canyon, Thailand
1993	EUR	(England) Nick Faldo	269	−11	1 stroke	(Scotland) Colin Montgomerie	Singapore Island, Singapore
Johnnie Walker Asian Classic
1992	EUR	(South Africa) Ian Palmer	268	−20	1 stroke	(Germany) Bernhard Langer (Australia) Brett Ogle (Northern Ireland) Ronan Rafferty	Pinehurst, Thailand
1991: No tournament
1990		(England) Nick Faldo	270	−14	4 strokes	(Wales) Ian Woosnam	Royal Hong Kong, Hong Kong
