= Patrick Burke (golfer) =

American professional golfer (1962–2024)

Personal information
- Full name: Patrick Thomas Burke
- Nationality: United States
- Born: March 17, 1962 Hollywood, Florida, U.S.
- Died: January 29, 2024 (aged 61) Orange County, California, U.S.
- Height: 5 ft 5 in (165 cm)
- Weight: 165 lb (75 kg)
- Spouse: Jody (m. 1989)
- Children: 1

Career
- Sport: Golf
- College: Citrus College; California State University, Dominguez Hills
- Turned professional: 1986
- Former tours: PGA Tour; Buy.com Tour; PGA Tour of Australasia
- Professional wins: 2

Number of wins by tour
- PGA Tour of Australasia: 2

Best results in major championships
- Masters Tournament: DNP
- PGA Championship: T31: 1996
- U.S. Open: CUT: 1992
- The Open Championship: T79: 1995

Patrick Thomas Burke (March 17, 1962 – January 29, 2024) was an American professional golfer who played on the PGA Tour in the 1990s. His best result on the tour was when he tied for third place in the 1996 B.C. Open. He won twice on the PGA Tour of Australasia in 1994.

== Amateur career ==
Burke was at Citrus College before transferring to California State University, Dominguez Hills. He won the Gary Sanders Memorial Tournament two years in succession.

== Professional career ==
Burke turned professional in 1986. In September 1987, he was the medalist in the Australian PGA Tour qualifying school and played a number of tournaments in Australia in the 1987-88 season.

In December 1989, he finished tied for 10th place in the PGA Tour qualifying school to gain a place on the tour for 1990. He had a poor season, missing the cut in 20 of 23 events. He played on the Ben Hogan Tour in 1991, finishing 92nd in the money list. Despite another poor season he qualified for the PGA Tour again with another good performance at the qualifying school, finishing tied for 8th place. He won just over $100,000 in both 1992 and 1993 but only made 2 cuts in 10 events in 1994, earning just $5,000.

In January 1994, Burke played in the Optus Players Championship in Australia, on a sponsor's invitation. Despite a double-bogey 6 at the final hole he won by a stroke, winning A$54,000 and getting a 5-year exemption on the Australasian Tour. The following week, he was tied for third place in the Heineken Classic. Burke returned to the Australasian Tour in late 1994, after his disappointing season on the PGA Tour. He played in the Epson Singapore Open and was then runner-up in the Alfred Dunhill Masters in Bali, benefiting from Nick Faldo's disqualification. The following week, he won the Victorian Open after birdieing the final three holes. Returning to the United States, Burke played in the PGA Tour qualifying school, finishing tied for 6th and regained his place on the tour.

Burke played on the PGA Tour in 1995, 1996 and 1997. 1996 was his best season, finishing 79th in the money list. His best result on the tour was in the 1996 B.C. Open, when he tied for third place with Tiger Woods. He played on the Buy.com Tour in 2000, 2001 and 2002. 2000 was his most successful season on the second tier tour, with four top-10 finishes, including being a runner-up in the Buy.com Boise Open. He finished 36th in the money list.

== Personal life ==
Burke was the son of Mike Burke Sr. (1938–1995), a professional golfer who won the 1966 New Jersey State Open. His brother Mike Jr. is also a professional golfer.

== Death ==
Burke died unexpectedly on January 29, 2024, at the age of 61.

== Professional wins (2) ==
=== PGA Tour of Australasia wins (2) ===
No.	Date	Tournament	Winning score	Margin of victory	Runner(s)-up
1	Jan 23, 1994	Optus Players Championship	−8 (69-67-72-72=280)	1 stroke	(Australia) Bradley Hughes
2	Nov 13, 1994	Victorian Open	−10 (73-70-68-67=278)	2 strokes	(Australia) Tim Elliott, (Australia) Robert Willis

== See also ==
- 1989 PGA Tour Qualifying School graduates
- 1991 PGA Tour Qualifying School graduates
- 1994 PGA Tour Qualifying School graduates
