= Jack Kay Jr. =

Canadian professional golfer (born 1964)

Personal information
- Nationality: Canada
- Born: July 14, 1964 (age 62) Montreal, Canada

Career
- Sport: Golf
- Turned professional: 1987
- Former tours: PGA Tour; Canadian Tour; PGA Tour of Australasia; Asia Golf Circuit
- Professional wins: 2

Number of wins by tour
- PGA Tour of Australasia: 1
- Other: 1

Best results in major championships
- Masters Tournament: CUT: 1986
- PGA Championship: DNP
- U.S. Open: CUT: 1991
- The Open Championship: DNP

Jack Kay Jr. (born July 14, 1964) is a Canadian professional golfer. He made the semifinals of the 1985 U.S. Amateur, defeating Scott Verplank in the quarterfinals, and led Canada to its first victory at the Eisenhower Trophy the following year. He had difficulties transitioning to the career of a touring professional, earning full-time status on the PGA Tour for only one season. He had a little more success overseas, winning the 1991 Singapore Open on the Asia Golf Circuit and the 1994 Alfred Dunhill Masters on the PGA Tour of Australasia.

== Early life ==
Kay was born in Montreal on July 14, 1964. His father, Jack Kay Sr., was a club professional. He primarily worked at Rosedale Golf Club in Toronto. In the winter, he was also Director of Golf at the Lyford Cay Club in Nassau, Bahamas. He worked at Lyford Cay from 1958 to 1995. Kay grew up in Don Mills, then a neighborhood within North York, a suburb of Toronto.

== Amateur career ==
Kay played out of Donalda Golf Club growing up. Among players from Ontario, he was considered the best amateur in his age group. He won the 1982 Ontario Boys Championship held at Brampton Golf Club. He also won the Canadian Junior Championship in 1982. Kay attended Furman University in the United States for college. He played on the golf team. He was Most Valuable Player on the golf team in 1985.

In August 1985, he played at the U.S. Amateur. He won his first three matches. In the quarterfinals, he faced Scott Verplank, recent winner of a PGA Tour event. Verplank took a took a 2 up lead after five holes. Then there was a rain delay. After the delay, Kay came back and won the next two holes to even the competition. The match remained all-square after 17 holes. The match was then delayed due to darkness. The two came back the next day, Saturday, to complete the match. On the 18th and final hole, both missed the green. Kay hit his pitch to two feet. Verplank mishit his chip shot, landing 35 feet from the hole. He two-putted for bogey. Kay made his par putt for the win. "I'm in shock," Kay stated immediately after the win, defeating the heavily favored Verplank. "If I can play with Verplank, I can play with anyone." Later in the day, he faced Sam Randolph in the semi-finals. Kay bogeyed the 3rd and 4th holes to fall two down. Later on the front nine, Kay got within one but could not get closer. Kay then bogeyed the 12th and Randolph birdied the 13th to move 3 up. Randolph won it with a par on the 15th, 4 and 3.

In 1986, Kay also had much success. His good play at the U.S. Amateur earned him an invitation to the 1986 Masters Tournament. He opened poorly with an 80 (+8). He played better in the second round, shooting a 74 (+2), but missed the cut by five shots. That year, he had much success representing Furman University in college events. Kay won the Furman Intercollegiate individual title that year, shooting a tournament record 203 (−13). He also led Furman towards winning the team component of the same event, defeating Wake Forest University by 11 strokes. He led Furman to three additional team titles in the year. Later in 1986, he finished runner-up at the Canadian Amateur Championship to Brent Franklin. In October, he played in the Eisenhower Trophy at Lagunita Country Club in Caracas, Venezuela. The Canadian team won by three strokes over the United States.

== Professional career ==
Kay turned pro in 1987. He made it onto the PGA Tour during 1988 PGA Tour Qualifying School. He finished in a tie for ninth against several dozen competitors. At the beginning of the 1989 season, Kay made the cut in four of his first five events, all on the West Coast swing. He had much more trouble after that, however, making the cut in only 5 of the 23 remaining events. He recorded one top-25 during the year, a T-25 at the Independent Insurance Agent Open. Kay did not play full-time on the PGA Tour again.

For the remainder of his career as a touring professional, Kay primarily played overseas. In 1990, he had some highlights. In January, he recorded a high finish at the Coca-Cola Classic on the PGA Tour of Australasia. Playing against a full-field with a number of big names, Kay finished in a tie for ninth. He defeated major championship winners Payne Stewart, Bernhard Langer, and Craig Stadler by several shots. In March, he recorded another high result, finishing in a tie for fourth at the Singapore Open on the Asia Golf Circuit.

In February 1991, he played the Singapore Open again. He opened with the lead. He entered the final round one back of Wayne Riley. Kay made four birdies on the front nine to move in front. He held a two stroke lead on the final hole and made a safe par for the win. He stated after the tournament, "It is the biggest moment of my career and hopefully the turning point too." Kay earned US$66,640, the biggest check of his career. He also qualified for the 1991 U.S. Open held that summer at Hazeltine National Golf Club. He did not play very well, however, missing the cut. His second round 83 tied for the worst score of the day. Much later in the year, he played in the Australian Open. He finished in a tie for 10th.

In early 1992, he played the Daikyo Palm Meadows Cup on the PGA Tour of Australasia. He finished in a tie for seventh. In 1993, he again played extensively in Australia, recording a number of top-25s but no top-10s.

In late 1994, he played the Alfred Dunhill Masters on the PGA Tour of Australasia. The event was held at Bali Golf and Country Club in Nusa Dua, Indonesia. Kay was at 205 (−8) after three rounds. He played with Nick Faldo and Patrick Burke during the final round. Kay was one-under through the first 11 holes of the final round but was six shots behind leader Faldo. On the 12th hole, however, the leaderboard changed "drastically." Faldo was notified that he removed a piece of coral from a bunker the previous day, unknowingly breaking the rules. He was immediately disqualified. Kay suddenly had a four stroke lead. He double-bogeyed the next hole, the 13th, however, to lose strokes to the field. Kay later stated, "It was confusing. We were down to a two-some and we lost rhythm and were talking about what happened." However, he parred the remaining five holes to defeat Burke by one. It was his first professional win since his 1991 win in Singapore. After the round, however, Kay stated, "There is definitely no way I would have wanted to win like that. As far as I am concerned I finished second but I won."

Kay struggled for the remainder of his career. He missed the cut in the majority of his events in Australia during the 1995–96 season. He has not played an official tour event since 1997.

During his career he was also a member of the Canadian Tour. He was inducted into the Furman University's Hall of Fame in 2000.

== Personal life ==
As of 2002, Kay was married to Christy. She occasionally served as his caddie. Kay also has two sisters.

== Amateur wins ==
- 1982 Ontario Boys Championship, Canadian Junior Championship
- 1986 Furman Intercollegiate event

== Professional wins (2) ==
=== Asia Golf Circuit wins (1) ===
No.	Date	Tournament	Winning score	Margin of victory	Runner-up
1	Feb 24, 1991	Epson Singapore Open	−8 (67-72-72-69=280)	2 strokes	(Australia) Wayne Riley

=== PGA Tour of Australasia wins (1) ===
No.	Date	Tournament	Winning score	Margin of victory	Runner-up
1	Nov 6, 1994	Alfred Dunhill Masters	−7 (73-66-66-72=277)	1 stroke	(United States) Patrick Burke

== Results in major championships ==
!Tournament	1986	1987	1988	1989	1990	1991
Masters Tournament	CUT					
U.S. Open						CUT

Note: Kay only played in the Masters and U.S. Open

Did not play

CUT = missed the half-way cut

== Team appearances ==
- Eisenhower Trophy (representing Canada): 1986

== See also ==
- 1988 PGA Tour Qualifying School graduates
