= Lucas Parsons =

Australian professional golfer (born 1969)

Personal information
- Full name: Lucas John Kendall Parsons
- Nationality: Australia
- Born: 4 October 1969 (age 57) Orange, New South Wales, Australia
- Height: 1.85 m (6 ft 1 in)

Career
- Sport: Golf
- Turned professional: 1992
- Former tours: PGA Tour; European Tour; PGA Tour of Australasia
- Professional wins: 9

Number of wins by tour
- European Tour: 1
- PGA Tour of Australasia: 4
- Challenge Tour: 2
- Other: 1

Best results in major championships
- Masters Tournament: DNP
- PGA Championship: DNP
- U.S. Open: T40: 1996
- The Open Championship: T41: 2000

Lucas John Kendall Parsons (born 4 October 1969) is an Australian former professional golfer.

== Early life and amateur career ==
In 1969, Parsons was born in Orange, New South Wales. As an amateur, he won both the Australian Amateur and New Zealand Amateur Championship in 1991.

== Professional career ==
In 1992, Parsons turned professional. He joined the PGA Tour of Australasia. Parsons won seven tournaments on the PGA Tour of Australasia, including the New Zealand Open in 1995. He played one unsuccessful season on the United States–based PGA Tour in 1996.

Parsons also played for a time on the European Tour after graduating from the second tier Challenge Tour in 1999, having won two tournaments and finished 10th on the money list. His best season-end ranking on the European Tour Order of Merit was 37th in 2000, the year he won the Greg Norman Holden International, also a PGA Tour of Australasia event. He finished a career best 2nd on that tour's Order of Merit at the end of the 1999/2000 season.

=== Restaurant career ===
Having retired from tournament golf at the end of 2008, Parsons now runs a café in Randwick, New South Wales, and was a participant in the first season of the competitive cooking television show MasterChef Australia. He hoped to expand his business and open a restaurant. He cooked a Singaporean Chili Crab dish which impressed the judges and helped him progress to the semi-finals. Parsons beat celebrity chef Ben O'Donoghue in the sixth Celebrity Chef Challenge to guarantee himself a place in the finals. He was the first finalist eliminated on 13 July 2009 followed by former competitor Julia Jenkins who also won a celebrity chef challenge.

== Amateur wins ==
- 1990 Lagonda Trophy (England)
- 1991 Australian Amateur, New Zealand Amateur, Australian Medal, New South Wales Amateur

== Professional wins (9) ==
=== European Tour wins (1) ===
No.	Date	Tournament	Winning score	Margin of victory	Runner-up
1	6 Feb 2000	Greg Norman Holden International^{1}	−19 (70-66-70-67=273)	4 strokes	(Australia) Peter Senior

^{1}Co-sanctioned by the PGA Tour of Australasia

=== PGA Tour of Australasia wins (4) ===
No.	Date	Tournament	Winning score	Margin of victory	Runner-up
1	7 Nov 1993	Victorian Open	−12 (72-69-65-70=276)	3 strokes	(Australia) Bradley Hughes
2	23 Oct 1994	Foodlink Queensland Open	−6 (66-72-75-69=282)	2 strokes	(New Zealand) Michael Campbell
3	15 Jan 1995	AMP Air New Zealand Open	−6 (72-72-70-68=282)	1 stroke	(Australia) Mike Clayton
4	6 Feb 2000	Greg Norman Holden International^{1}	−19 (70-66-70-67=273)	4 strokes	(Australia) Peter Senior

^{1}Co-sanctioned by the European Tour

PGA Tour of Australasia playoff record (0–1)

No.	Year	Tournament	Opponent	Result
1	1992	Air New Zealand Shell Open	(Zimbabwe) Nick Price	Lost to par on first extra hole

=== Challenge Tour wins (2) ===
No.	Date	Tournament	Winning score	Margin of victory	Runner-up
1	30 May 1999	Challenge de Sablé	−18 (67-67-73-63=270)	4 strokes	(Sweden) Kalle Brink
2	1 Aug 1999	Finnish Masters	−16 (68-67-71-66=272)	1 stroke	(Denmark) Thomas Nørret

=== Other wins (3) ===
- 1997 Toyota Southern Classic
- 1997 Queensland PGA Championship (Development Tour)
- 1998 Queensland PGA Championship (Development Tour)

== Results in major championships ==
Tournament	1996	1997	1998	1999	2000
U.S. Open	T40				
The Open Championship					T41

Note: Parsons never played in the Masters Tournament or the PGA Championship.

Did not play

"T" = tied

== Results in World Golf Championships ==
Tournament	2000
Match Play	
Championship	T45
Invitational	

Did not play

"T" = Tied

== Team appearances ==
Amateur

- Nomura Cup (representing Australia): 1991 (winners)
- Eisenhower Trophy (representing Australia): 1992
- Sloan Morpeth Trophy (representing Australia): 1992
- Australian Men's Interstate Teams Matches (representing New South Wales): 1989 (winners), 1990 (winners), 1991 (winners), 1992 (winners)

Professional

- World Cup (representing Australia): 2000
- Alfred Dunhill Challenge (representing Australasia): 1995

== See also ==
- 1995 PGA Tour Qualifying School graduates
