= Alfred Dunhill Masters =

Tournament information
- Location: Hong Kong
- Established: 1994
- Course: Hong Kong Golf Club
- Par: 71
- Tours: PGA Tour of Australasia; Asian Tour
- Format: Stroke play
- Prize fund: US$500,000
- Month played: October/November
- Final year: 1996

Tournament record score
- Aggregate: 267 Bernhard Langer (1996); 267 Michael Campbell (1995)
- To par: −21 Michael Campbell (1995)

Final champion
- (Germany) Bernhard Langer
- Location in China Location in Hong Kong

The Alfred Dunhill Masters was a golf tournament held from 1994 to 1996. The first two events were in Indonesia and the final event was in Hong Kong. It was always part of the Australasian Tour but co-sanctioned with the Asian Tour in 1996.

In 1994 it was played at the Bali Golf and Country Club, Nusa Dua, Bali, Indonesia; in 1995 it was played at the Emeralda Golf and Country Club, Jakarta, Indonesia; and in 1996 it was played at the Royal Hong Kong Golf Club. The prize money was A$350,000 in 1994, US$400,000 in 1995 and US$500,000 in 1996.

The 1994 event received a decent amount of media attention for the "dramatic disqualification" of leader Nick Faldo. Faldo held a six stroke lead on the 12th hole of the final round. He was then notified that he unknowingly broke a rule the previous day, removing a piece of coral from a bunker. He was immediately disqualified paving the way for playing partner Jack Kay Jr. to win the event.

== Winners ==
Year	Tour(s) (Note: ANZ − PGA Tour of Australasia; ASA − Asian Tour.)	Winner	Score	To par	Margin of victory	Runner(s)-up	Winner's share	Venue	Ref.
1996	ANZ, ASA	(Germany) Bernhard Langer	267	−17	2 strokes	(South Korea) Kang Wook-soon	US$94,735	Hong Kong	
1995	ANZ	(New Zealand) Michael Campbell	267	−21	5 strokes	(Wales) Mark Mouland (Australia) Craig Parry	A$95,000	Emeralda	
1994	ANZ	(Canada) Jack Kay Jr.	277	−7	1 stroke	(United States) Patrick Burke	A$62,000	Bali	
