= Craig Spence (golfer) =

Australian professional golfer (born 1974)

Personal information
- Full name: Craig A. Spence
- Nationality: Australia
- Born: 17 September 1974 (age 52) Colac, Victoria, Australia
- Height: 1.82 m (6 ft 0 in)
- Weight: 210 lb (95 kg; 15 st)

Career
- Sport: Golf
- College: Victorian Institute of Sport
- Turned professional: 1996
- Current tour: PGA Tour of Australasia
- Former tours: PGA Tour; European Tour; Gateway Tour
- Professional wins: 3
- Highest ranking: 100 (5 December 1999)

Number of wins by tour
- PGA Tour of Australasia: 1
- Other: 2

Best results in major championships
- Masters Tournament: DNP
- PGA Championship: DNP
- U.S. Open: CUT: 2000
- The Open Championship: CUT: 1999

Craig A. Spence (born 17 September 1974) is an Australian professional golfer.

== Early life and amateur career ==
Spence was born in Colac, Victoria and first played golf at the age of 10. Around the age of 15 he began competing at an amateur level. He then went on to the Victorian Institute of Sport, winning two Victorian Amateurs back to back.

== Professional career ==
In 1996, Spence turned professional and joined the PGA Tour of Australasia. In 1999, Spence made his professional breakthrough with victory in the Ericsson Australian Masters. Having opened up with a 9-under-par first round, he finished by hitting a 6 iron to two feet for a birdie on the final hole to win by a single stroke over Australia's most successful golfer, playing partner Greg Norman. Following that win Spence received invites to tournaments around the world, on five of the major tours. He managed to record top 5 finishes in events on all of those tours.

At the end of 1999, Spence earned his PGA Tour card for the 2000 season with a top 10 finish at the tour's Qualifying School. His rookie year on the PGA Tour was a struggle and he missed out on keeping a full card for 2001, finishing 129th on the money list. He made just two cuts the following season to lose all playing rights on the tour. He spent two more years in the United States competing mostly on mini-tours while receiving invites to a limited number of second tier Nationwide Tour events.

He also continued to play on the PGA Tour of Australasia with limited success, though he did have an exceptional round playing the 2003 Johnnie Walker Classic at the Lake Karrinyup Country Club in Perth, Western Australia.

Spence had a spectacular third round in that tournament where he equalled the course record of 63, set the previous year in the same event by Retief Goosen. The round also included eight consecutive birdies between the fourth and eleventh holes that matched the records for both the European and Australasian tours.

Spence then turned his attentions to Europe at the end of 2003, earning a spot on the European Tour for 2004 via the qualifying school.

In his début European season, he made just three cuts as he failed to keep his card for the 2005 season. He then returned to the United States, to play on the Gateway Tour in preparation for another try at qualifying for the PGA Tour. Having missed out on reaching the final qualifying tournament by one shot in 2006, he and his family moved back to Australia.

== Amateur wins ==
- 1994 Victorian Amateur Championship
- 1995 Luxembourg Amateur Championship, Victorian Amateur Championship

== Professional wins (3) ==
=== PGA Tour of Australasia wins (1) ===
No.	Date	Tournament	Winning score	Margin of victory	Runner-up
1	14 Feb 1999	Ericsson Masters	−16 (64-73-69-70=276)	1 stroke	(Australia) Greg Norman

PGA Tour of Australasia playoff record (0–1)

No.	Year	Tournament	Opponent	Result
1	1999	ANZ Players Championship	(Australia) Brett Rumford (a)	Lost to birdie on fourth extra hole

=== Gateway Tour wins (1) ===
No.	Date	Tournament	Winning score	Margin of victory	Runner-up
1	20 Apr 2006	Desert Spring B5	−11 (67-69-69=205)	2 strokes	(United States) John Douma

=== Other wins (1) ===
- 1997 Borrego Springs Open (U.S. mini-tour)

== Results in major championships ==
Tournament	1999	2000
U.S. Open		CUT
The Open Championship	CUT	

Note: Spence never played in the Masters Tournament or the PGA Championship.

Did not play

CUT = Missed the half-way cut

== Results in World Golf Championships ==
Tournament	1999
Match Play	
Championship	58
Invitational	

Did not play

== Team appearances ==
Amateur

- Australian Men's Interstate Teams Matches (representing Victoria): 1994 (winners), 1995

== See also ==
- 1999 PGA Tour Qualifying School graduates
