= Michael Long (golfer) =

New Zealand professional golfer (born 1968)

Personal information
- Full name: Michael Richard Long
- Nationality: New Zealand
- Born: 27 August 1968 (age 58) Cromwell, New Zealand
- Height: 1.88 m (6 ft 2 in)
- Spouse: Carey

Career
- Sport: Golf
- Turned professional: 1990
- Current tours: PGA Tour of Australasia; European Senior Tour
- Former tours: PGA Tour; European Tour; Nationwide Tour; OneAsia Tour
- Professional wins: 26
- Highest ranking: 86 (24 August 1997)

Number of wins by tour
- PGA Tour of Australasia: 4
- Korn Ferry Tour: 2
- Other: 20

Best results in major championships
- Masters Tournament: DNP
- PGA Championship: DNP
- U.S. Open: DNP
- The Open Championship: T66: 1998

Achievements and awards
- Von Nida Tour Order of Merit winner: 2008

Michael Richard Long (born 27 August 1968) is a New Zealand professional golfer. He has played on a number of tours, including two seasons on the PGA Tour and three seasons on the European Tour. He won four times on the PGA Tour of Australasia between 1996 and 2018 and twice on the Nationwide Tour. He was medalist at 2020 European Senior Tour Q-School.

== Early life and amateur career ==
In 1968, Long was born in Cromwell, New Zealand. He took up golf when he lived at Waitangi where his father worked, later attending Waikato University.

Long had considerable success as an amateur golfer, winning the New Zealand under-18 title in 1985, the under-21 title in 1988, the under-23 title in 1989, and the New Zealand Amateur in 1990. He was in the four-man New Zealand team in the 1990 Eisenhower Trophy, played in Christchurch, New Zealand. The team finished joint runners-up behind Sweden. Individually Long had the joint third best score, behind two Swedes.

== Professional career ==
Long turned professional after the Eisenhower Trophy and joined the PGA Tour of Australasia. Despite having limited success on his home tour he traveled to the United States to play at 1995 PGA Tour Qualifying School earning a place on the Nike Tour, the developmental tour. He played in nine tournaments between March and August. His best finish was to be tied for fourth place in his last event, the Nike Permian Basin Open. Following this experience Long had much more success in the 1996/1997 Australasian Tour season, results that lifted him from outside the top 800 into the top 100 of the Official World Golf Rankings. During this season he won the 1996 New Zealand Open, his major success as a professional. In January 1997, he was a runner-up in the Johnnie Walker Classic, an event co-sponsored by the European Tour, winning A$121,000. Ernie Els won the event, a stroke ahead of Long and Peter Lonard. Long incurred a one-stroke penalty, penalising himself, when his ball moved after he addressed the ball on the 15th green of the final round. He was also third in the Greg Norman Holden International, the Schweppes Coolum Classic, and the Ford South Australian Open, and had three other top-10 finishes.

Long's runner-up finish in the Johnnie Walker Classic gave him playing opportunities on the European Tour and he played on the tour from 1997 to 1999. He was 43rd in the Order of Merit in 1997, 84th in 1998, and 131rd in 1999. Long played with Grant Waite in the 1997 World Cup of Golf, the pair finishing in a tie for 9th place. In February 1999, Long won the Greg Norman Holden International at The Lakes Golf Club. Bernhard Langer came to final hole needing par-3 for victory. However he took a triple-bogey 6, Long taking the A$180,000 first prize.

In late 1999, Long's career was interrupted after suffering a broken C5 bone in his neck in a boogie boarding accident. After making a recovery he turned his attentions to America and played on the second-tier Buy.com Tour, which became the Nationwide Tour in 2003. He had some success at this level, winning twice, at the 2001 Buy.com Boise Open and the 2003 VB Open, and losing in a playoff for the 2004 Lake Erie Charity Classic. He twice finished high enough in the money list to graduate to the PGA Tour. Playing two full seasons on the main tour, in 2002 and 2005, he was unable to keep his card on either occasion. Long played on the Buy.com/Nationwide Tour from 2000 to 2007 with the exception of his two seasons on the main PGA Tour.

By 2008 Long had lost his playing rights on the Nationwide Tour and returned to Australasia. He topped the 2008 Von Nida Tour money list and was tied for third in the 2009 Australian Open. From 2009 Long also played on the OneAsia tour. In 2011 he lost in a four-man playoff for the Nanshan China Masters and he had third-place finishes in the 2009 Midea China Classic and the 2012 Enjoy Jakarta Indonesia Open.

In early 2016, at the age of 47, Long won the Oates Victorian Open after a playoff against Matthew Millar. Millar had birdied the last three holes to force a playoff. At the first playoff hole Long hooked his second shot into long grass but managed to hit the ball to five feet and holed the putt to win the title with a birdie 4. In May 2018, Long won the TX Civil & Logistics WA PGA Championship at Kalgoorlie Golf Course, one stroke ahead of Brody Martin after a final round 64.

Since turning 50 Long has played on the Ladbrokes Legends Tour. In 2018, he won Lincoln Place NSW Senior Open and the Australian PGA Seniors Championship and won the Sheraton South Pacific Golf Classic in 2019. In January 2020, he was medalist at European Senior Tour Q-School. The 2020 season was cancelled but his playing rights were rolled over to the 2021 season and he finally made his debut on the tour in June 2021. The following month he led his qualifying section for the 2021 Senior Open Championship with a 5-under-par 65, to get a place in the event, his first senior major.

Long was on the board of the PGA of Australia from 2014 to 2018.

== Amateur wins ==
- 1985 New Zealand under 18s
- 1988 New Zealand under 21s
- 1989 New Zealand under 23s
- 1990 New Zealand Amateur

== Professional wins (26) ==
=== PGA Tour of Australasia wins (4) ===
No.	Date	Tournament	Winning score	Margin of victory	Runner-up
1	8 Dec 1996	AMP Air New Zealand Open	−9 (65-71-72-67=275)	4 strokes	(Australia) Peter O'Malley
2	7 Feb 1999	Greg Norman Holden International	−9 (73-72-66-72=283)	1 stroke	(New Zealand) Michael Campbell
3	7 Feb 2016	Oates Vic Open	−13 (69-70-67-69=275)	Playoff	(Australia) Matthew Millar
4	13 May 2018	TX Civil & Logistics WA PGA Championship	−14 (70-69-71-64=274)	1 stroke	(Australia) Brody Martin

PGA Tour of Australasia playoff record (1–0)

No.	Year	Tournament	Opponent	Result
1	2016	Oates Vic Open	(Australia) Matthew Millar	Won with birdie on first extra hole

=== Nationwide Tour wins (2) ===
No.	Date	Tournament	Winning score	Margin of victory	Runner-up
1	23 Sep 2001	Buy.com Boise Open	−14 (66-69-67-68=270)	1 stroke	(South Africa) Tjaart van der Walt
2	18 May 2003	VB Open	−11 (72-65-70-70=277)	2 strokes	(United States) Vaughn Taylor

Nationwide Tour playoff record (0–1)

No.	Year	Tournament	Opponents	Result
1	2004	Lake Erie Charity Classic	(United States) Kevin Stadler, (United States) Bubba Watson	Stadler won with par on fourth extra hole Long eliminated by par on first hole

=== Von Nida Tour wins (1) ===
No.	Date	Tournament	Winning score	Margin of victory	Runner-up
1	2 Nov 2008	Oceanique WA PGA Championship	−13 (68-69-69-69=275)	3 strokes	(Australia) Matthew Griffin

=== Other wins (3) ===
- 1992 South West Open (Australia), New Caledonia Open
- 2007 Nedlands Masters

=== PGA of Australia Legends Tour wins (14) ===
No.	Date	Tournament	Winning score	Margin of victory	Runner(s)-up
1	28 Oct 2018	Lincoln Place NSW Senior Open	−12 (70-67-67=204)	1 stroke	(Australia) Peter Senior
2	3 Nov 2018	Australian PGA Seniors Championship	−12 (65-65-68=198)	1 stroke	(Australia) Peter Senior
3	15 May 2019	Royal Fremantle Legends Pro-Am			
4	30 Aug 2019	Royal QLD Cup			
5	18 Sep 2019	Sheraton South Pacific Golf Classic	−3 (73-69-71=213)	3 strokes	(Australia) Tim Elliott, (Australia) Martin Peterson
6	4 Feb 2020	Moama Masters (with (Australia) Richard Gilkey)			
7	7 Mar 2021	"The Jack Harris & Brian Twite" Victorian PGA Seniors Foursomes Championship (with (Australia) Andre Stolz)			
8	10 Mar 2021	Moama Masters			
9	6 Mar 2022	"The Jack Harris & Brian Twite" Victorian PGA Seniors Foursomes Championship (with (Australia) Nigel Lane)			
10	2 Mar 2023	Club Mandalay Legends Pro-Am			
11	8 Mar 2023	The White Glove Mover Legends Pro-Am			
12	1 Apr 2023	Glenn Joyner Legends Invitational			
13	7 Mar 2025	Gardiners Run Legends Pro-Am (with (Australia) David McKenzie)			
14	13 Mar 2026	Legends on the Legends Pro-Am			

=== Other senior wins (2) ===
- 2019 TSA Sanwell Senior Invitational
- 2026 Lyndsay Stephen Cottesloe Invitational

== Playoff record ==
OneAsia Tour playoff record (0–1)

No.	Year	Tournament	Opponents	Result
1	2011	Nanshan China Masters	(Australia) Craig Hancock, (South Korea) Kim Bi-o, (Australia) Scott Laycock	Kim won with birdie on third extra hole Hancock eliminated by par on second hole Laycock eliminated by par on first hole

== Results in major championships ==
Tournament	1997	1998	1999
The Open Championship	CUT	T66	CUT

Note: Long only played in The Open Championship.
CUT = missed the half-way cut
"T" = tied

== Team appearances ==
Amateur

- Nomura Cup (representing New Zealand): 1989
- Eisenhower Trophy (representing New Zealand): 1990
- Sloan Morpeth Trophy (representing New Zealand): 1990

Professional

- Dunhill Cup (representing New Zealand): 1997, 1998, 1999
- World Cup (representing New Zealand): 1997

== See also ==
- 2001 Buy.com Tour graduates
- 2004 Nationwide Tour graduates
