= Anthony Painter =

Australian professional golfer

Personal information
- Nationality: Australia
- Born: 11 June 1965 (age 61) Milton, New South Wales, Australia
- Height: 5 ft 11 in (1.80 m)
- Weight: 200 lb (91 kg; 14 st)

Career
- Sport: Golf
- Turned professional: 1985
- Former tours: PGA Tour of Australasia; PGA Tour; Nationwide Tour
- Professional wins: 4

Number of wins by tour
- PGA Tour of Australasia: 2
- Korn Ferry Tour: 1
- Other: 1

Anthony Painter (born 11 June 1965) is an Australian professional golfer.

== Career ==
Painter was born in Milton, New South Wales.

In 1985, Painter turned professional. Painter played on the PGA Tour of Australasia winning twice: at the 1993 Meru Valley Perak Masters and the 1996 Schweppes Coolum Classic.

Painter played on the Nationwide Tour from 1998 to 2002 and 2004 to 2006. He won once, at the 1998 Nike Ozarks Open. He also played on the PGA Tour where his best finish was T-10 at the 1997 Quad City Classic.

== Professional wins (4) ==
=== PGA Tour of Australasia wins (2) ===
| No. | Date | Tournament | Winning score | Margin of victory | Runner-up |
|---|---|---|---|---|---|
| 1 | 24 Oct 1993 | Meru Valley Perak Masters | −13 (70-66-68-71=275) | 1 stroke | (Australia) John Senden |
| 2 | 15 Dec 1996 | Schweppes Coolum Classic | −8 (71-68-68-73=280) | 2 strokes | (Australia) Matthew Ecob |

=== Nike Tour wins (1) ===
| No. | Date | Tournament | Winning score | Margin of victory | Runner-up |
|---|---|---|---|---|---|
| 1 | 16 Aug 1998 | Nike Ozarks Open | −21 (67-63-68-69=267) | 1 stroke | (United States) Scott Dunlap |

=== Australasian Development Tour wins (1) ===
| No. | Date | Tournament | Winning score | Margin of victory | Runner-up |
|---|---|---|---|---|---|
| 1 | 25 Mar 2001 | Queensland PGA Championship | −20 (70-63-64-71=268) | 5 strokes | (Australia) Scott Gardiner |

== See also ==
- 2002 PGA Tour Qualifying School graduates
