= Coolum Classic =

Golf tournament held in Australia

Schweppes Coolum Classic
Tournament information
- Location: Yaroomba, Queensland, Australia
- Established: 1990
- Course: Hyatt Regency Coolum Resort
- Par: 72
- Tour: PGA Tour of Australasia
- Format: Stroke play
- Prize fund: A$300,000
- Month played: December
- Final year: 1999

Tournament record score
- Aggregate: 271 Ian Baker-Finch (1990); 271 Rodger Davis (1992); 271 Stuart Appleby (1998)
- To par: −17 as above

Final champion
- (Australia) Nick O'Hern
- Location in Australia Location in Queensland

The Coolum Classic was a golf tournament held in Australia between 1990 and 1999. The tournament was held at the Hyatt Regency Coolum Resort in Yaroomba, Queensland. Schweppes became the title sponsor from 1994.

Prize money was A$150,000 in 1990 rising to A$200,000 from 1992 to 1996. Prize money was $300,000 in 1999. In its inaugural year, the Coolum Classic also doubled as the Queensland Open.

== Winners ==
Year	Winner	Score	To par	Margin of victory	Runner(s)-up	Winner's share (A$)	Ref.
Schweppes Coolum Classic
1999	(Australia) Nick O'Hern	206 (Note: Shortened to 54 holes due to rain.)	−10	2 strokes	(Australia) Wayne Smith	54,000	
1998	(Australia) Stuart Appleby	271	−17	4 strokes	(Australia) Craig Spence	36,000	
1997	(Australia) Craig Parry	276	−12	3 strokes	(Australia) Robert Allenby	36,000	
1996	(Australia) Anthony Painter	280	−8	2 strokes	(Australia) Matthew Ecob	36,000	
1995	(Australia) Shane Robinson	278	−10	3 strokes	(Australia) Steven Conran	36,000	
1994	(Australia) Mike Clayton	277	−11	4 strokes	(Australia) Andre Stolz	36,000	
Coolum Classic
1993	(Australia) David Diaz	275	−13	4 strokes	(Australia) David Ecob (Australia) Jeff Wagner	36,000	
1992	(Australia) Rodger Davis	271	−17	7 strokes	(Australia) Mike Clayton	36,000	
1991	Cancelled						
1990	(Australia) Ian Baker-Finch	271	−17	5 strokes	(England) Stephen Bennett (Australia) Rodger Davis	27,000	
