= 2005 PGA Tour of Australasia =

Golf tour season

2005 PGA Tour of Australasia season
- Duration: 3 February 2005 – 11 December 2005
- Number of official events: 8
- Most wins: (Australia) Robert Allenby (3)
- Order of Merit: (Australia) Adam Scott

The 2005 PGA Tour of Australasia was the 33rd season on the PGA Tour of Australasia, the main professional golf tour in Australia and New Zealand since it was formed in 1973.

== Schedule ==
The following table lists official events during the 2005 season.

Date	Tournament	Location	Purse (A$)	Winner (Note: The number in brackets after each winner's name is the number of PGA Tour of Australasia events they had won up to and including that tournament. This information is only shown for PGA Tour of Australasia members.)	OWGR points	Other tours (Note: AFR − Sunshine Tour; ASA − Asian Tour; EUR − European Tour; NWT − Nationwide Tour.)	Notes
6 Feb	Heineken Classic	Victoria	2,000,000	(Australia) Craig Parry (11)	40	EUR	
13 Feb	Holden New Zealand Open	New Zealand	NZ$1,500,000	(Sweden) Niclas Fasth (n/a)	24	EUR	
20 Feb	Jacob's Creek Open Championship	South Australia	1,000,000	(Australia) Steven Bowditch (1)	12	NWT	
27 Feb	ING New Zealand PGA Championship	New Zealand	US$600,000	(Australia) Peter O'Malley (4)	12	NWT	
24 Apr	Johnnie Walker Classic	China	£1,250,000	(Australia) Adam Scott (1)	24	ASA, EUR	
27 Nov	MFS Australian Open	Victoria	1,250,000	(Australia) Robert Allenby (9)	32		Flagship event
4 Dec	Cadbury Schweppes Centenary Australian PGA Championship	Queensland	1,200,000	(Australia) Robert Allenby (10)	26		
11 Dec	MasterCard Masters	Victoria	1,250,000	(Australia) Robert Allenby (11)	30		

=== Unofficial events ===
The following events were sanctioned by the PGA Tour of Australasia, but did not carry official money, nor were wins official.

Date	Tournament	Location	Purse (A$)	Winner	OWGR points	Other tours	Notes
13 Nov	HSBC Champions	China	US$5,000,000	(England) David Howell	48	AFR, (Note: Sunshine Tour unofficial event) ASA, (Note: Asian Tour unofficial event) EUR	New limited-field event

== Order of Merit ==
The Order of Merit was based on prize money won during the season, calculated in Australian dollars.

Position	Player	Prize money (A$)
1	(Australia) Adam Scott	545,429
2	(Australia) Nick O'Hern	441,200
3	(Australia) Craig Parry	404,341
4	(Australia) Steven Bowditch	328,481
5	(Australia) Peter O'Malley	294,109

== Von Nida Tour ==
2005 Von Nida Tour season
- Duration: 28 January 2005 – 20 November 2005
- Number of official events: 11
- Most wins: (Australia) Michael Wright (2)
- Order of Merit: (Australia) Adam Bland

The 2005 Von Nida Tour was the third season of the Von Nida Tour, the official development tour to the PGA Tour of Australasia between 2003 and 2008.

=== Schedule ===
The following table lists official events during the 2005 season.

Date	Tournament	Location	Purse (A$)	Winner (Note: The number in brackets after each winner's name is the number of Von Nida Tour events they had won up to and including that tournament. It is rare for someone to accumulate many wins on the Von Nida Tour as success at this level usually leads to promotion to the PGA Tour of Australasia.)	Ref.
30 Jan	Mitsubishi Motors Victorian Open	Victoria	100,000	(Australia) Kurt Barnes (2)	
5 Mar	National Australia Bank Victorian PGA Championship	Victoria	105,000	(Australia) Cameron Percy (1)	
13 Mar	Bega Cheese NSW PGA Championship	New South Wales	110,000	(Australia) Gavin Flint (1)	
20 Mar	Toyota Southern Classic	New South Wales	100,000	(Australia) Michael Wright (1)	
29 Apr	SA PGA Championship	South Australia	100,000	(Australia) Tony McFadyean (1)	
29 May	WA PGA Championship	Western Australia	100,000	(Australia) Adam Bland (1)	
26 Jun	Nth QLD X-Ray Services Cairns Classic	Queensland	105,000	(New Zealand) Tony Christie (1)	
30 Oct	Minniecon & Burke Queensland Masters	Queensland	105,000	(Australia) Nick Flanagan (1)	
6 Nov	Roadcon Group Queensland Open	Queensland	105,000	(Australia) Brad McIntosh (2)	
13 Nov	Greater Building Society QLD PGA Championship	Queensland	105,000	(Australia) Scott Gardiner (1)	
20 Nov	Proton New South Wales Open	New South Wales	120,000	(Australia) Michael Wright (2)	

=== Order of Merit ===
The Order of Merit was based on prize money won during the season, calculated in Australian dollars. The top 10 players on the Order of Merit earned status to play on the 2006 PGA Tour of Australasia.

Position	Player	Prize money (A$)
1	(Australia) Adam Bland	40,180
2	(Australia) Brad McIntosh	38,811
3	(Australia) Michael Wright	38,122
4	(Australia) Tony McFadyean	33,331
5	(Australia) Gavin Flint	30,954
6	(Australia) Brad Andrews	30,684
7	(Australia) Nick Flanagan	30,277
8	(Australia) Leigh McKechnie	27,732
9	(Australia) Cameron Percy	26,214
10	(New Zealand) Tony Christie	21,936
