= Australian Tournament Players Championship =

Golf tournament

ANZ Players Championship
Tournament information
- Location: Eagle Farm, Queensland, Australia
- Established: 1988
- Course: Royal Queensland Golf Club
- Par: 73
- Tours: PGA Tour of Australasia; Asian Tour
- Format: Stroke play
- Prize fund: A$800,000
- Month played: December
- Final year: 1999

Tournament record score
- Aggregate: 270 Greg Norman (1988); 270 Bradley Hughes (1996)
- To par: −18 Greg Norman (1988)

Final champion
- (Australia) Brett Rumford
- Location in Australia Location in Queensland

The Australian Tournament Players Championship was a golf tournament held in Australia between 1988 and 1999.

The events was held in 1988 and 1989 at Riverside Oaks Golf Club, Sydney with both events being won by Greg Norman. Total prize money was A$300,000 in 1988 and A$500,000 in 1989.

After a three-year gap the tournament was revived in 1993 as the Optus Players Championship. Prize money was A$300,000 in 1993, A$285,000 in 1994 and A$350,000 in 1995.

== Tournament highlights ==
During the 1989 tournament, Robert Emond scored 19 on the 573-yard par five 1st hole during his second round, while Adam Nance scored 11 on the 152-yard par three 14th hole during his first round.

== Winners ==
Year	Tour(s) (Note: ANZ − PGA Tour of Australasia; ASA − Asian PGA Tour.)	Winner	Score	To par	Margin of victory	Runner(s)-up	Venue	Ref.
ANZ Players Championship
1999	ANZ	(Australia) Brett Rumford (a)	280	−12	Playoff	(Australia) Craig Spence	Royal Queensland	
1998	ANZ	(Australia) Stephen Leaney	275	−17	Playoff	(United States) Corey Pavin	Royal Queensland	
Australasian Players Championship
1997	ANZ	(Australia) Greg Chalmers	276	−12	1 stroke	(Australia) Peter Lonard	Royal Queensland	
Australian Players Championship
1996	ANZ, ASA	(Australia) Bradley Hughes	270	−14	12 strokes	(Australia) Peter Lonard (Australia) Robert Stephens	Robina Woods	
Optus Players Championship
1995	ANZ	(Australia) Tim Elliott	283	−5	1 stroke	(Australia) Peter Fowler	Kingston Heath	
1994	ANZ	(United States) Patrick Burke	280	−8	1 stroke	(Australia) Bradley Hughes	Kingston Heath	
1993	ANZ	(Australia) Robert Allenby	274	−14	Playoff	(Australia) Wayne Grady	Royal Melbourne	
Australian Tournament Players Championship
1992	ANZ	Removed from the schedule						
1991	ANZ	Cancelled						
1990: No tournament
1989	ANZ	(Australia) Greg Norman (2)	276	−12	2 strokes	(Australia) Roger Mackay	Riverside Oaks	
1988	ANZ	(Australia) Greg Norman	270	−18	8 strokes	(Australia) David Graham (Australia) Peter Senior	Riverside Oaks	
