= Greg Norman Holden International =

Tournament information
- Location: Sydney, Australia
- Established: 1993
- Course: The Lakes Golf Club
- Par: 73
- Length: 6,904 yards (6,313 m)
- Tours: European Tour; PGA Tour of Australasia
- Format: Stroke play
- Prize fund: A$2,000,000
- Month played: February
- Final year: 2001

Tournament record score
- Aggregate: 271 Aaron Baddeley (2001); 271 Sergio García (2001)
- To par: −21 as above

Final champion
- (Australia) Aaron Baddeley
- Location in Australia Location in New South Wales

The Greg Norman Holden International was a men's professional golf tournament on the PGA Tour of Australasia. It was founded by Greg Norman in 1993, replacing the Johnnie Walker Australian Classic on the tour schedule, and was held until 2001. It was also co-sanctioned with the European Tour in 2000 and 2001. It was known as the Greg Norman's Holden Classic from 1993 to 1996.

== Tournament hosts ==
- 1999–2001 The Lakes Golf Club
- 1998 The Australian Golf Club
- 1996 Royal Melbourne Golf Club
- 1995 The Lakes Golf Club
- 1994 Royal Melbourne Golf Club
- 1993 The Lakes Golf Club

== Winners ==
Year	Tour(s) (Note: ANZ − PGA Tour of Australasia; EUR − European Tour.)	Winner	Score	To par	Margin of victory	Runner(s)-up
Greg Norman Holden International
2001	ANZ, EUR	(Australia) Aaron Baddeley	271	−21	Playoff	(Spain) Sergio García
2000	ANZ, EUR	(Australia) Lucas Parsons	273	−19	4 strokes	(Australia) Peter Senior
1999	ANZ	(New Zealand) Michael Long	283	−9	1 stroke	(New Zealand) Michael Campbell
1998	ANZ	(Australia) Greg Norman	272	−16	2 strokes	(Spain) José María Olazábal
1997: No tournament
Greg Norman's Holden Classic
1996	ANZ	(Australia) Peter Senior	281	−7	1 stroke	(Australia) Greg Norman
1995	ANZ	(Australia) Craig Parry	276	−16	1 stroke	(New Zealand) Michael Campbell
1994	ANZ	(Australia) Anthony Gilligan	274	−14	2 strokes	(United States) Mark Calcavecchia (Australia) Paul Moloney (Australia) Greg Norman
1993	ANZ	(United States) Curtis Strange	274	−18	2 strokes	(Australia) John Wade
