= Stephen Leaney =

Australian professional golfer (born 1969)

Personal information
- Full name: Stephen John Leaney
- Nationality: Australia
- Born: 10 March 1969 (age 57) Busselton, Australia
- Height: 1.83 m (6 ft 0 in)
- Spouse: Tracy
- Children: 2

Career
- Sport: Golf
- Turned professional: 1992
- Current tour: PGA Tour of Australasia
- Former tours: PGA Tour; European Tour
- Professional wins: 16
- Highest ranking: 22 (27 July 2003)

Number of wins by tour
- European Tour: 4
- PGA Tour of Australasia: 4
- Other: 8

Best results in major championships
- Masters Tournament: T17: 2004
- PGA Championship: 68th: 1998
- U.S. Open: 2nd: 2003
- The Open Championship: T37: 2002

Stephen John Leaney (born 10 March 1969) is an Australian professional golfer.

== Career ==
In 1969, Leaney was born in Busselton, Western Australia, Australia.

In 1992, Leaney turned professional. He won several tournaments in Australia in the 1990s, despite having two ribs cut removed in December 1993 after doctors diagnosed a blood clot in his shoulder. Leaney has since spoken to W.A media and confirmed the threatening injury may have been caused from his prior to golf career in premier league darts.

Between 1998 and 2003 he made the top 15 on the European Tour Order of Merit three times and won four European Tour events. Since 2004 he has played mainly on the based PGA Tour, but he has performed only moderately. His best finish in the United States remains a second place at the U.S. Open in 2003. He has featured in the top 50 of the Official World Golf Rankings.

Leaney has represented his country several times as an amateur and a professional and was a member of the International Team at the 2003 Presidents Cup.

== Amateur wins ==
- 1992 (2) Malaysian Amateur Championship, Lake Macquarie Amateur

== Professional wins (16) ==
=== European Tour wins (4) ===
No.	Date	Tournament	Winning score	Margin of victory	Runner-up
1	15 Mar 1998	Moroccan Open	−17 (68-67-69-67=271)	8 strokes	(Sweden) Robert Karlsson
2	26 Jul 1998	TNT Dutch Open	−18 (66-63-70-67=266)	1 stroke	(Northern Ireland) Darren Clarke
3	30 Jul 2000	TNT Dutch Open (2)	−19 (66-70-65-68=269)	4 strokes	(Germany) Bernhard Langer
4	15 Sep 2002	Linde German Masters	−22 (64-69-66-67=266)	3 strokes	(Germany) Alex Čejka

European Tour playoff record (0–1)

No.	Year	Tournament	Opponent	Result
1	2002	Carlsberg Malaysian Open	(Scotland) Alastair Forsyth	Lost to birdie on second extra hole

=== PGA Tour of Australasia wins (4) ===
No.	Date	Tournament	Winning score	Margin of victory	Runner(s)-up
1	19 Nov 1995	Victorian Open	−5 (72-72-68-71=283)	1 stroke	(Australia) Robert Allenby, (Australia) Mike Clayton
2	12 Jan 1997	Victorian Open (2)	−8 (64-72-72-72=280)	1 stroke	(Australia) Darren Cole, (Australia) Euan Walters
3	29 Nov 1998	ANZ Players Championship	−17 (67-73-67-68=275)	Playoff	(United States) Corey Pavin
4	22 Oct 2017	Nexus Risk TSA Group WA Open	−15 (64-71-69-69=273)	1 stroke	(Australia) Callan O'Reilly

PGA Tour of Australasia playoff record (1–0)

No.	Year	Tournament	Opponent	Result
1	1998	ANZ Players Championship	(United States) Corey Pavin	Won with par on first extra hole

=== Foundation Tour wins (4) ===
- 1991 Western Australian Open (as an amateur)
- 1994 Western Australian Open
- 1997 Western Australian Open, Western Australia PGA Championship

=== Other wins (4) ===
- 2001 Nedlands Masters
- 2002 Western Australian Open (incorporating the Nedlands Masters)
- 2004 Western Australian Open (incorporating the Nedlands Masters)
- 2010 Nedlands Masters

== Results in major championships ==
Tournament	1995	1996	1997	1998	1999
Masters Tournament					
U.S. Open					CUT
The Open Championship	CUT			CUT	CUT
PGA Championship				68	CUT

Tournament	2000	2001	2002	2003	2004	2005	2006	2007
Masters Tournament					T17			
U.S. Open				2	T40			
The Open Championship	CUT	CUT	T37	T65	CUT			
PGA Championship				CUT	CUT	CUT		CUT

Top 10
Did not play

CUT = missed the half-way cut
"T" = tied

=== Summary ===
Tournament	Wins	2nd	3rd	Top-5	Top-10	Top-25	Events	Cuts made
Masters Tournament	0	0	0	0	0	1	1	1
U.S. Open	0	1	0	1	1	1	3	2
The Open Championship	0	0	0	0	0	0	8	2
PGA Championship	0	0	0	0	0	0	6	1
Totals	0	1	0	1	1	2	18	6

- Most consecutive cuts made – 3 (2002 Open Championship – 2003 Open Championship)
- Longest streak of top-10s – 1

== Results in The Players Championship ==
Tournament	2003	2004	2005	2006	2007	2008
The Players Championship	CUT	CUT	CUT	CUT	CUT	CUT

CUT = missed the halfway cut

== Results in World Golf Championships ==
Tournament	1999	2000	2001	2002	2003	2004	2005
Match Play	R64				R16	4	R64
Championship			NT^{1}	T23		63	
Invitational					T71	T22	

^{1}Cancelled due to 9/11

Top 10
Did not play

QF, R16, R32, R64 = Round in which player lost in match play
"T" = Tied
NT = No tournament

== Results in senior major championships ==
Tournament	2019	2020	2021	2022
The Tradition		NT	T19	T36
Senior PGA Championship	T28	NT	T11	T50
U.S. Senior Open		NT		
Senior Players Championship		T16	T52	
Senior British Open Championship	T18	NT		

Did not play

"T" indicates a tie for a place
NT = No tournament due to COVID-19 pandemic

== Team appearances ==
Amateur

- Nomura Cup (representing Australia): 1991 (winners)
- Eisenhower Trophy (representing Australia): 1992
- Sloan Morpeth Trophy (representing Australia): 1991 (winners), 1992

Professional

- Alfred Dunhill Cup (representing Australia): 1999, 2000
- Presidents Cup (International Team): 2003 (tie)
- World Cup (representing Australia): 2003, 2004
