= Nomura Cup =

The Nomura Cup, also known as the Asia-Pacific Amateur Golf Team Championship, is a biennial amateur team golf championship for men organised by the Asia-Pacific Golf Confederation. The inaugural event was held in 1963 and it was played in odd-numbered years until 2022 when it switched to even-numbered years.

== Format ==
Teams used to consist of four players but from 2022 the playing members have been reduced to three. The tournament is held over 4 days with 18 holes of stroke play on each day, the best two rounds counting for the team score.

== History ==
In the early tournaments, only the Philippines, Japan and Chinese Taipei competed. By the eighth championship in 1977, held in Malaysia, a then record of 10 nations were competing. Australia, New Zealand and Papua New Guinea were invited beginning with the 1979 tournament. Only Australia, Japan and Chinese Taipei have won multiple times. South Korea, New Zealand and India have won as hosts. Thailand took an early lead at the 2017 tournament and managed to secure a maiden win. The 2019 edition scheduled for Hong Kong was postponed due to security concerns.

== Results ==
| Year | Venue(s) | Location | Winners | Runner-up |
|---|---|---|---|---|
| 2024 | Vinpearl Golf Haiphong | Vietnam | Vietnam (556); Nguyen Anh Minh; Le Khanh Hung; Ho Anh Huy | Japan (559); Taishi Moto; Masayuki Yamashita; Takumi Kobayashi |
| 2022 | Manila Southwoods Golf & Country Club | Philippines | Japan (552); Yuta Sugiura; Minato Oshima; Riura Matsui | Singapore (559); James Leow; Ryan John Ang; Brandon Han |
| 2019 | Clearwater Bay | Hong Kong | Postponed due to the 2019–20 Hong Kong protests | |
| 2017 | Kuala Lumpur | Malaysia | Thailand (808); Kammalas Namuangruk; Sadom Kaewkanjana; Atiruj Winaicharoenchai; Kosuke Hamamoto | Japan (820); Kazuya Osawa; Takumi Kanaya; Daiki Imano; Keita Nakajima |
| 2015 | Yas Links Golf Club | Abu Dhabi | Japan (842); Daisuke Matsubara; Takumi Kanaya; Naoyuki Kataoka; Toshiki Ishitoku | Chinese Taipei (842); Chiu Han-ting; Kevin Yu; Liu Yung-hua; Lu Sun-yi |
| 2013 | Santiburi Country Club, Chaing Rai | Thailand | Australia (828); Cameron Davis; Geoff Drakeford; Taylor Macdonald; Aaron Wilkin | South Korea (837); Ham Jeong-woo; Kim Nam-hun; Lee Chang-woo; Lee Soo-min |
| 2011 | Denaru Golf Club | Fiji | Australia (840); Marika Batibasaga; Daniel Bringolf; Jake Higginbottom; Cameron Smith | New Zealand (861); Sam An; Ryan Fox; Vaughan McCall; Mathew Perry |
| 2009 | Namseoul Country Club | South Korea | South Korea (846); Han Chang-won; Kim Meen-whee; Lee Kyoung-hoon; Yoon Jung-ho | Chinese Taipei (868); Hung Chien-yao; Yang Fei-hao; Hsieh Chi-hsien; Huang Tao |
| 2007 | Sunrise Golf Club | Taiwan | Australia (882); Rohan Blizard; Andrew Dodt; Rick Kulacz; Tim Stewart | Japan (891); Yuki Ito; Shunsuke Sonoda; Naoyuki Tamura; Yuki Usami |
| 2005 | Narita Golf Club | Japan | Australia (814); Andrew Dodt; Won Jon Lee; Michael Sim; Andrew Tampion | New Zealand (831); Josh Geary; Mathew Holten; Bradley Iles; Mark Purser |
| 2003 | Links Golf Club, Port Douglas | Queensland, Australia | Australia (852); Nick Flanagan; Richard Moir; James Nitties; Michael Sim | South Korea (870); Kim Hye-dong; Kim Kyung-tae; Lee Dong-hwan; Sung Si-woo |
| 2001 | Wu Yi Fountain Palm Golf Club | China | Australia (814); Andrew Buckle; Steven Bowditch; Marcus Fraser; Luke Hickmott | New Zealand (821); Sam Hunt; Eddie Lee; Brad Shilton; Tim Wilkinson |
| 1999 | Lahore Gymkhana Golf Club | Pakistan | Australia (845); Scott Gardiner; Brad Lamb; Wayne Perske; Brett Rumford | South Korea (853); Jung Sung-han; Kim Dae-sub; Kim Hyung-tae; Kim Sung-yoon |
| 1997 | Hong Kong Golf Club | Hong Kong | Chinese Taipei (829); Kao Bo-song; Su Chin-jung; Chan Yih-shin; Lin Wen-ko | Australia (830); David Gleeson; Geoff Ogilvy; Cameron Percy; Brett Rumford |
| 1995 | Russley Golf Club | New Zealand | New Zealand (889); Richard Best; Hadyn Morgan; Martin Pettigrew; David Somervaille | Australia (890); Lee Eagleton; Mathew Goggin; Jarrod Moseley; Lester Peterson |
| 1993 | Royal Selangor Golf Club | Malaysia | Australia (852); David Bransdon; Steve Collins; Jason Dawes; Chris Jones | Japan (858); Shingo Katayama; Katsumasa Miyamoto; Shinichi Yokota; Kazuyoshi Yonekura |
| 1991 | Wack Wack Golf Club | Philippines | Australia (883); Robert Allenby; Steve Collins; Stephen Leaney; Lucas Parsons | South Korea (893); Ahn Joo-hwan; Kim Joo-hyung; Lee In-woo; Park Tae-won |
| 1989 | Taiwan Golf Club | Taiwan | Japan (887); Ryoken Kawagishi; Shigeki Maruyama; Kiyotaka Oie; Tetsuo Sakata | New Zealand (895); Owen Kendall; Michael Long; Brent Paterson; Phil Tataurangi |
| 1987 | Royal Hua Hin Golf Club | Thailand | Japan (877); Tetsuo Sakata; Takahiro Nakagawa; Tomio Otomo; Kazuyoshi Yonekura | Australia (877); David Ecob; Bradley Hughes; Brett Johns; Lester Peterson |
| 1985 | Royal Adelaide Golf Club | Australia | Australia (874); Brad King; Brett Ogle; Craig Parry; Gerard Power | Chinese Taipei (889); Chen Yun-mao; Hsieh Chin-sheng; Lin Chie-hsiang; Lin Tze-cheng |
| 1983 | Nam Seoul Country Club | South Korea | Chinese Taipei (869); Lai Chung-jen; Li Wen-chen; Yu Chin-han; Yuan Ching-chi | Australia (876); Tony Dight; Gerard Power; Wayne Smith; Chris Tatt |
| 1981 | Royal Calcutta Golf Club | India | Japan (879); Tetsuo Sakata; Masayuki Naito; Kazuhiko Kato; Taichiro Kanatani | New Zealand (901); Michael Barltrop; Neil Gaskin; Paul Hartstone; Colin Taylor |
| 1979 | Singapore Island Country Club | Singapore | Japan (850); Ginjiro Nakabe; Yutaka Hagawa; Nobumitsu Yuhara; Masayuki Naito | Chinese Taipei (871); Chang Dong-liang; Chen Tze-chung; Lin Chia; Yuan Ching-chi |
| 1977 | Royal Selangor Golf Club | Malaysia | Chinese Taipei (865); Chen Tze-chung; Chen Tze-ming; Lu Hsi-chuen; Tsao Chien-teng | Philippines (887); Thomas Manotoc; Frankie Miñoza; David Hernandez; Emilio Tuason |
| 1975 | Tokyo Golf Club | Japan | Japan (850); Ginjiro Nakabe; Michio Mori; Tetsuo Sakata; Masahiro Kuramoto | Chinese Taipei (884); Chang Ter-kuei; Chen Tze-ming; Lu Hsi-chuen; Chao Chien-teng |
| 1973 | Jakarta Golf & Country Club | Indonesia | India (876); P. K. Pitamber; P. G. Sethi; Vikramjit Singh; Lakshman Singh | Japan (879); Tsutomu Irie; Michio Mori; Ginjiro Nakabe; Tetsuo Sakata |
| 1971 | Wack Wack Golf & Country Club | Philippines | Japan (894); Tsutomu Irie; Zenjiro Takano; Nobuo Takahashi; Michio Mori | Philippines (911); Luis Silverio; Tomas Manotoe; Rolando Viray; Ed Unson |
| 1969 | Seoul Country Club | South Korea | Chinese Taipei (891); Chang Tung-chan; Chen Chien-chi; Ho Ming-chung; Lee Cheng-Hsiung | Japan (898); Ginjiro Nakabe; Tsutomu Irie; Kenichi Yamada; Shinji Morikawa |
| 1967 | Taiwan Golf Club | Taiwan | Chinese Taipei (861); Chen Chien-chin; Ho Ming-chung; Hsu Sheng-san; Shay Yee-shone | Japan (906); Shoichiro Maeda; Michio Mori; Ginjiro Nakabe; Masahiko Shimazake |
| 1965 | Nikko Country Club | Japan | Japan (876); Yoshikane Hirose; Masahiko Mikame; Ginjiro Nakabe; Akihiro Teramoto | Chinese Taipei (890); Chen Chien-chi; Chen Chien-chin; Hsu Sheng-san; Lee Cheng-Hsiung |
| 1963 | Wack Wack Golf & Country Club | Philippines | Japan (1544); Yoshikane Hirose; Kiyoshi Ishimoto; Noriyuki Miyoshi; Naomoto Nabeshima; Hiroyasu Tomita; Takayuki Yoshikawa | Chinese Taipei (1547); Chang Tung-chan; Chen Chien-chin; Hsieh Min-Nan; Hsu Sheng-san; Kuo Chie-Hsiung; Kuo Jung-shu |

== Results summary ==
| Country | Winner | Runner-up |
|---|---|---|
| Japan | 10 | 6 |
| Australia | 10 | 4 |
| Chinese Taipei | 5 | 7 |
| South Korea | 1 | 4 |
| New Zealand | 1 | 5 |
| India | 1 | – |
| Thailand | 1 | – |
| Vietnam | 1 | – |
| Philippines | – | 2 |
| Singapore | – | 1 |
| Total | 29 | 29 |

== See also ==
- Eisenhower Trophy – biennial world amateur team golf championship for men organized by the International Golf Federation
