= Warren Sye =

Canadian golfer

Personal information
- Full name: Warren Sye
- Nationality: Canada
- Born: 1956 (age 69–70)

Career
- Sport: Golf
- Status: Amateur

Warren Sye (born 1956) is a Canadian amateur golfer who has won several important championships.

== Early life and college career ==
Sye was born in Toronto, Ontario. He began playing at a young age at the Weston Golf and Country Club in Toronto, where his father, a low-handicap player, had a membership. He attended the University of Houston on a golf scholarship, graduating in 1980. While there, he was a teammate with players such as Fred Couples, Blaine McCallister, and Jim Nantz.

== Golf career ==
Sye was a member of the Canadian team which won the Eisenhower Trophy in Venezuela in 1986, along with Brent Franklin, Mark Brewer, and Jack Kay Jr.

Sye has won the Canadian Amateur Championship twice, in 1990 at his home course, Weston Golf Club, and in 1994 at Hamilton Golf and Country Club. Also, Sye finished third in the Canadian Amateur in 1988. He has won the Ontario Amateur Championship five times, the first time in 1988 at the Board of Trade Club (West Course), where he crushed the field with an 11-stroke margin over the runner-up. Sye finished as runner-up in the 1998 U.S. Mid-Amateur, held at NCR Country Club in Kettering, Ohio, losing in the match play final to John "Spider" Miller.

Sye broke the longstanding course record at the Hamilton club with a round of 62, smashing the previous mark of 64, which had been first set in 1930 by Tommy Armour, and then tied in 1977 by Jim Nelford. This record has since been set at 60 by Brandt Snedeker in the second round at the 2019 Canadian Open, hosted at the Hamilton club. The Weston Golf Club has conferred honorary life membership upon Sye. He currently works as a sales representative in the golf industry, and has remained an amateur golfer playing recreationally, while taking a break from the competitive golf scene in recent seasons.

== Awards and honors ==
In 2016, Sye was inducted into the Canadian Golf Hall of Fame.

== Amateur wins ==
this list is incomplete

- 1988 Ontario Amateur
- 1990 Canadian Amateur
- 1994 Canadian Amateur

== Team appearances ==
Amateur

- Eisenhower Trophy (representing Canada): 1986 (winners), 1988, 1990, 1994
