= 1993 PGA Tour of Australasia =

Golf tour season

1993 PGA Tour of Australasia season
- Duration: 21 January 1993 – 19 December 1993
- Number of official events: 14 (Note: A further six tournaments were scheduled but were cancelled.)
- Order of Merit: (Australia) Peter Senior
- Player of the Year: (Australia) Peter Senior
- Rookie of the Year: (New Zealand) Michael Campbell

The 1993 PGA Tour of Australasia was the 22nd season on the PGA Tour of Australasia, the main professional golf tour in Australia and New Zealand since it was formed in 1973.

== Schedule ==
The following table lists official events during the 1993 season.

Date	Tournament	Location	Purse (A$)	Winner (Note: The number in brackets after each winner's name is the number of PGA Tour of Australasia events they had won up to and including that tournament. This information is only shown for PGA Tour of Australasia members.)	OWGR points	Notes
24 Jan	Optus Players Championship	Victoria	300,000	(Australia) Robert Allenby (3)	18	
31 Jan	Heineken Classic	Western Australia	300,000	(Australia) Peter Senior (12)	24	
~~14 Feb~~	New South Wales Open	New South Wales	–	Cancelled	–	
14 Feb; ~~28 Feb~~	AMP New Zealand Open	New Zealand	NZ$300,000	(Australia) Peter Fowler (4)	16	
21 Feb	Microsoft Australian Masters	Victoria	700,000	(Australia) Bradley Hughes (2)	36	
~~28 Feb~~	Australian Match Play Championship	Victoria	–	Cancelled	–	
28 Feb	Canon Challenge	New South Wales	250,000	(New Zealand) Michael Campbell (1)	16	New tournament
7 Mar	Epson Singapore Open	Singapore	US$400,000	(Australia) Paul Moloney (1)	36	New to PGA Tour of Australasia
~~3 Oct~~	Sabah Masters	Malaysia	–	Cancelled	–	New to PGA Tour of Australasia
~~10 Oct~~	Penang Masters	Malaysia	–	Cancelled	–	New tournament
~~17 Oct~~	Singapore PGA Championship	Singapore	–	Cancelled	–	
24 Oct	Meru Valley Perak Masters	Malaysia	175,000	(Australia) Anthony Painter (1)	16	
~~31 Oct~~	Dunhill Malaysian Masters	Malaysia	–	Cancelled	–	
7 Nov	Victorian Open	Victoria	200,000	(Australia) Lucas Parsons (1)	16	
14 Nov	Eagle Blue Open	South Australia	200,000	(Australia) Wayne Smith (2)	16	
21 Nov	Ford Australian PGA Championship	New South Wales	350,000	(Australia) Ian Baker-Finch (10)	16	
28 Nov	Heineken Australian Open	Victoria	850,000	(United States) Brad Faxon (n/a)	32	Flagship event
5 Dec	Greg Norman's Holden Classic	New South Wales	700,000	(United States) Curtis Strange (n/a)	36	New tournament
11 Dec	Air New Zealand Shell Open	New Zealand	NZ$300,000	(Australia) Terry Price (2)	16	
19 Dec	Coolum Classic	Queensland	200,000	(Australia) David Diaz (1)	16	

== Order of Merit ==
The Order of Merit was based on prize money won during the season, calculated in Australian dollars.

Position	Player	Prize money (A$)
1	(Australia) Peter Senior	243,504
2	(Australia) Bradley Hughes	190,147
3	(Australia) Robert Allenby	171,083
4	(Australia) Paul Moloney	134,694
5	(Australia) Mike Clayton	131,034

== Awards ==
Award	Winner	Ref.
Player of the Year	(Australia) Peter Senior	
Rookie of the Year	(New Zealand) Michael Campbell	
