= 1996–97 PGA Tour of Australasia =

Golf tour season

1996–97 PGA Tour of Australasia season
- Duration: 25 January 1996 – 23 February 1997
- Number of official events: 19
- Most wins: (Australia) Peter Senior (3)
- Order of Merit: (Australia) Peter Lonard

The 1996–97 PGA Tour of Australasia was the 25th season on the PGA Tour of Australasia, the main professional golf tour in Australia and New Zealand since it was formed in 1973.

== Schedule ==
The following table lists official events during the 1996–97 season.

Date	Tournament	Location	Purse (A$)	Winner (Note: The number in brackets after each winner's name is the number of PGA Tour of Australasia events they had won up to and including that tournament. This information is only shown for PGA Tour of Australasia members.)	OWGR points	Other tours (Note: ASA − Asian PGA Tour; EUR − European Tour.)	Notes
28 Jan	Johnnie Walker Classic	Singapore	£600,000	(Wales) Ian Woosnam (n/a)	42	EUR	New to PGA Tour of Australasia
4 Feb	Heineken Classic	Western Australia	800,000	(Wales) Ian Woosnam (n/a)	34	EUR	
11 Feb	Ford South Australian Open	South Australia	200,000	(Australia) Greg Norman (31)	24		
18 Feb	Ericsson Masters	Victoria	500,000	(Australia) Craig Parry (7)	22		
25 Feb	Canon Challenge	New South Wales	300,000	(Australia) Peter Senior (15)	16		
20 Oct	Foodlink Queensland Open	Queensland	200,000	(Australia) Steven Alker (1)	16		
27 Oct	Australian Players Championship	Queensland	500,000	(Australia) Bradley Hughes (3)	16	ASA	
3 Nov	Alfred Dunhill Masters	Hong Kong	US$500,000	(Germany) Bernhard Langer (n/a)	26	ASA	
17 Nov	Australian PGA Championship	New South Wales	300,000	(New Zealand) Phil Tataurangi (1)	16		
24 Nov	Holden Australian Open	New South Wales	850,000	(Australia) Greg Norman (32)	32		Flagship event
1 Dec	Greg Norman's Holden Classic	Victoria	700,000	(Australia) Peter Senior (16)	30		
8 Dec	AMP Air New Zealand Open	New Zealand	NZ$500,000	(Australia) Michael Long (1)	16		
15 Dec	Schweppes Coolum Classic	Queensland	200,000	(Australia) Anthony Painter (2)	16		
12 Jan	Victorian Open	Victoria	200,000	(Australia) Stephen Leaney (2)	16		
26 Jan	Johnnie Walker Classic	Queensland	£700,000	(South Africa) Ernie Els (n/a)	44	EUR	
2 Feb	Heineken Classic	Western Australia	1,100,000	(Spain) Miguel Ángel Martín (n/a)	32	EUR	
9 Feb	Ford South Australian Open	South Australia	300,000	(Australia) Steven Alker (2)	22		
16 Feb	Ericsson Masters	Victoria	750,000	(Australia) Peter Lonard (1)	20		
23 Feb	Canon Challenge	New South Wales	450,000	(Australia) Peter Senior (17)	16		

== Order of Merit ==
The Order of Merit was based on prize money won during the season, calculated in Australian dollars.

Position	Player	Prize money (A$)
1	(Australia) Peter Lonard	484,534
2	(Australia) Peter Senior	359,051
3	(New Zealand) Michael Long	329,327
4	(Australia) Greg Norman	322,026
5	(Australia) Peter O'Malley	261,271
