= 1986 Eisenhower Trophy =

Team golf tournament

Coordinates: 10.423°N 66.810°W

Tournament information
- Dates: 22–25 October
- Location: Caracas, Venezuela
- Course: Lagunita Country Club
- Format: 72 holes stroke play

Statistics
- Par: 70
- Length: 6,782 yards (6,201 m)
- Field: 39 teams 156 players

Champion
- Canada; Mark Brewer, Brent Franklin, Jack Kay Jr. & Warren Sye
- 838 (−2)
- Location in Venezuela

The 1986 Eisenhower Trophy took place 22 to 25 October at the Lagunita Country Club in Caracas, Venezuela. It was the 15th World Amateur Team Championship for the Eisenhower Trophy. The tournament was a 72-hole stroke play team event with 39 four-man teams. The best three scores for each round counted towards the team total.

Canada won the Eisenhower Trophy for the first time, finishing three strokes ahead of the silver medalists, United States. Chinese Taipei took the bronze medal, a further eight strokes behind with Sweden finishing fourth. Eduardo Herrera, representing Colombia, had the lowest individual score, 5-under-par 275.

== Teams ==
39 four-man teams contested the event.

The following table lists the players on the leading teams.

Country	Players
Australia	Brad King, Peter O'Malley, Ray Picker, Stephen Taylor
Canada	Mark Brewer, Brent Franklin, Jack Kay Jr., Warren Sye
Chinese Taipei	Chen Yun-mao, Hsieh Chin-sheng, Lin Chie-hsiang, Lin Chin-cheng
Colombia	Fernando Arriola, Fabio Bernal, Alberto Evers, Eduardo Herrera
France	Alexis Godillot, Laurent Lassalle, Jean-François Remésy, Jean van de Velde
Great Britain & Ireland	David Curry, Peter McEvoy, Garth McGimpsey, Colin Montgomerie
New Zealand	Phil Aicken, Michael Barltrop, Glen Goldfinch, Brent Paterson
Spain	Eduardo de la Riva, Snr, Luis Gabarda, Borja Queipo de Llano, Roman Taya
Sweden	Cristian Härdin, Jesper Parnevik, Johan Ryström, Carl-Magnus Strömberg
United States	Buddy Alexander, Billy Andrade, Bob Lewis, Jay Sigel
West Germany	Hans-Günter Reiter, Ekkehart Schieffer, Sven Strüver, Ralf Thielemann

== Scores ==
Place	Country	Score	To par
1st place, gold medalist(s)	Canada	208-210-212-208=838	−2
2nd place, silver medalist(s)	United States	204-210-213-214=841	+1
3rd place, bronze medalist(s)	Chinese Taipei	215-208-212-214=849	+9
4	Sweden	217-214-216-211=858	+18
5	Australia	216-225-211-207=859	+19
6	West Germany	218-217-212-220=867	+27
7	New Zealand	214-217-218-219=868	+28
T8	Colombia	226-216-212-216=870	+30
T8	France	220-218-213-219=870	+30
10	Spain	223-216-220-214=873	+33
11	Brazil	219-214-222-223=878	+38
12	Great Britain & Ireland	219-217-224-220=880	+40
13	Venezuela	217-215-222-227=881	+41
T14	Denmark	220-220-217-226=883	+43
T14	Japan	222-218-220-223=883	+43
16	Chile	222-214-221-228=885	+45
17	Italy	224-216-218-229=887	+47
18	Mexico	222-220-226-223=891	+51
19	Greece	226-229-219-223=897	+57
T20	Finland	227-222-224-227=900	+60
T20	Netherlands	222-228-224-226=900	+60
22	Switzerland	228-223-229-223=903	+63
23	Trinidad and Tobago	229-227-232-219=907	+67
T24	Argentina	222-223-234-229=908	+68
T24	South Korea	226-226-227-229=908	+68
26	Paraguay	230-236-227-226=919	+79
27	Zimbabwe	222-233-229-238=922	+82
28	Austria	228-233-234-230=925	+85
29	Portugal	234-239-231-222=926	+86
30	Bermuda	229-224-244-232=929	+89
31	Peru	230-240-232-231=933	+93
32	Belgium	243-228-234-230=935	+95
33	Hong Kong	233-239-228-238=938	+98
34	Panama	232-239-237-234=942	+102
T35	Costa Rica	230-236-245-234=945	+105
T35	Guatemala	230-247-231-237=945	+105
37	Dominican Republic	240-232-235-243=950	+110
38	Ivory Coast	248-237-247-246=978	+138
39	Puerto Rico	267-258-256-274=1055	+215

== Individual leaders ==
There was no official recognition for the lowest individual scores.

Place	Player	Country	Score	To par
1	Eduardo Herrera	Colombia	75-67-68-65=275	−5
T2	Mark Brewer	Canada	70-69-69-69=277	−3
T2	Jay Sigel	United States	66-70-70-71=277	−3
4	Hsieh Chin-sheng	Chinese Taipei	71-67-69-72=279	−1
T5	Brent Franklin	Canada	68-74-72-68=282	+2
T5	Stephen Taylor	Australia	70-75-70-67=282	+2
T7	Buddy Alexander	United States	70-71-71-71=283	+3
T7	Lin Chie-hsiang	Chinese Taipei	73-71-70-69=283	+3
T9	Bob Lewis	United States	71-69-72-72=284	+4
T9	Johan Ryström	Sweden	73-71-71-69=284	+4
