= Brett Rumford =

Australian professional golfer (born 1977)

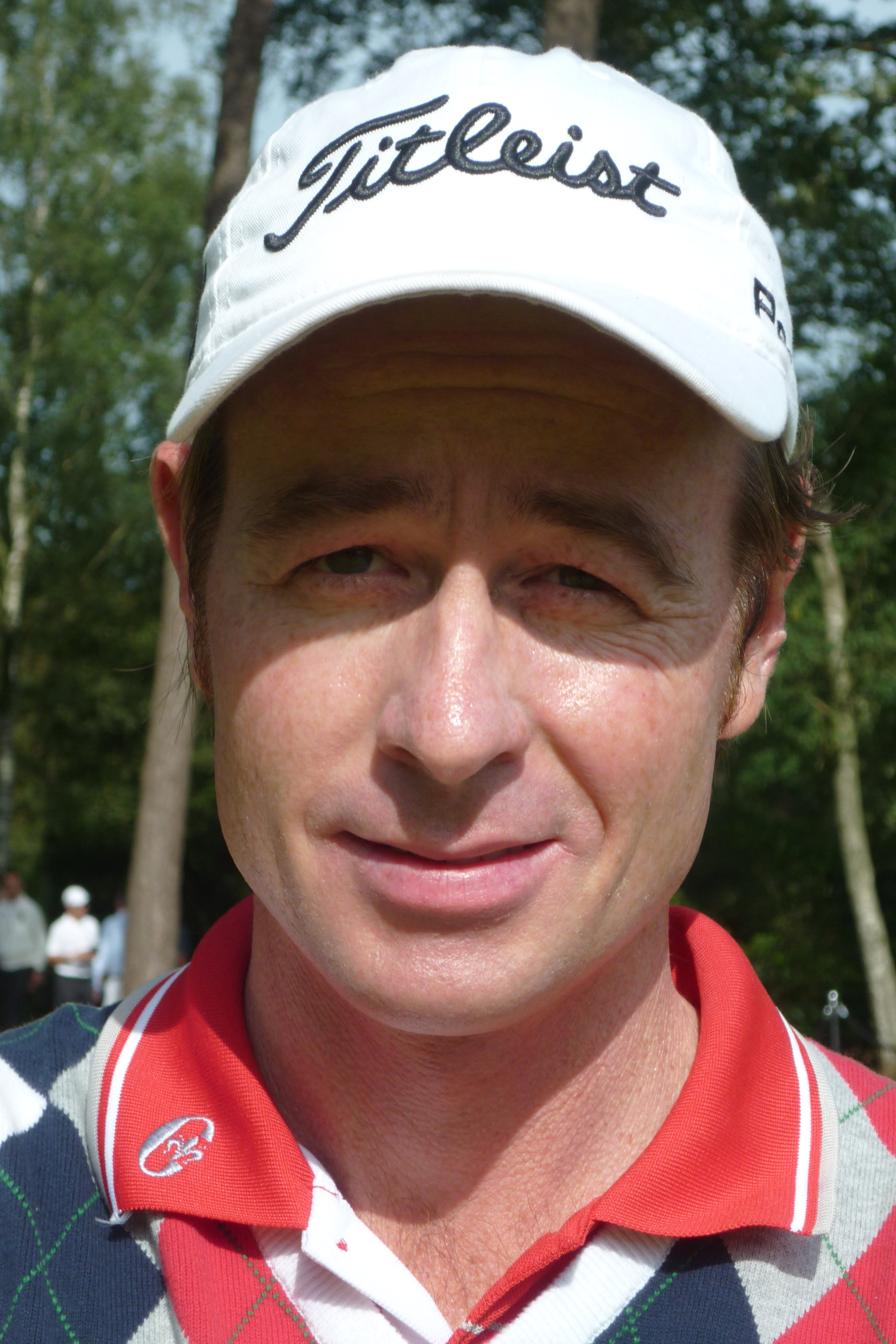

Personal information
- Full name: Brett Michael Rumford
- Nickname: Rummy
- Nationality: Australia
- Born: 27 July 1977 (age 49) Perth, Western Australia, Australia
- Height: 1.79 m (5 ft 10 in)
- Weight: 74 kg (163 lb; 11.7 st)
- Spouse: Sally (m. 2008)

Career
- Sport: Golf
- Turned professional: 2000
- Current tour: PGA Tour of Australasia
- Former tours: PGA Tour; European Tour; Asian Tour; Challenge Tour
- Professional wins: 9
- Highest ranking: 74 (19 May 2013)

Number of wins by tour
- European Tour: 6
- Asian Tour: 2
- PGA Tour of Australasia: 3
- Challenge Tour: 1
- Other: 1

Best results in major championships
- Masters Tournament: DNP
- PGA Championship: CUT: 2013
- U.S. Open: DNP
- The Open Championship: T16: 2006

Achievements and awards
- PGA Tour of Australasia Rookie of the Year: 1999–2000
- PGA Tour of Australasia Order of Merit winner: 2017

Brett Michael Rumford (born 27 July 1977) is an Australian professional golfer who plays on the PGA Tour of Australasia, having formerly been a member on both the PGA Tour and European Tour.

== Early life ==
Rumford was born and grew up in Perth, Western Australia. He started playing golf at age ten. Rumford represented Australia in amateur golf.

== Professional career ==
In 1999, Rumford won the PGA Tour of Australasia's ANZ Players Championship as an amateur, and he turned professional the following year. He has been a member of the European Tour since 2001, and has won six European Tour events, the 2003 Aa St Omer Open, the 2004 Irish Open, the 2007 Omega European Masters, the 2013 Ballantine's Championship, the 2013 Volvo China Open, and the 2017 ISPS Handa World Super 6 Perth. His best year-end ranking on the Order of Merit Is 17th in 2013.

Rumford played on the PGA Tour in 2008, after earning his card through qualifying school, finishing the season ranked 149th in the FedEx Cup standings. He returned to play on the European Tour in 2009.

In April 2013, Rumford won for the fourth time on the European Tour and for the first time in six years at the Ballantine's Championship in South Korea. In a sudden-death playoff, Rumford eagled the first extra hole to defeat Marcus Fraser and Peter Whiteford. In the playoff, after both opponents had failed to reach the par-five 18th in two, Rumford fired his approach to within four feet of the hole to set up the eagle and seal victory. The following week he continued his good form winning the Volvo China Open, his fifth on the European Tour, his score of −16 giving him a four stroke winning margin over Mikko Ilonen. With this win he became the 31st golfer to win consecutive events on the European Tour and the first since Branden Grace in January 2012 and moved to the top of the Race to Dubai standings.

In February 2017, Rumford won the ISPS Handa World Super 6 Perth. He beat Phachara Khongwatmai, 2 and 1, in the final.

== Amateur wins ==
- 1998 Australian Amateur, Lake Macquarie Amateur

== Professional wins (9) ==
=== European Tour wins (6) ===
No.	Date	Tournament	Winning score	Margin of victory	Runner(s)-up
1	15 Jun 2003	Aa St Omer Open^{1}	−15 (64-70-68-67=269)	5 strokes	(England) Ben Mason
2	25 Jul 2004	Nissan Irish Open	−14 (66-71-70-67=274)	4 strokes	(Republic of Ireland) Pádraig Harrington, (France) Raphaël Jacquelin
3	9 Sep 2007	Omega European Masters	−16 (68-66-66-68=268)	Playoff	(England) Phillip Archer
4	28 Apr 2013	Ballantine's Championship^{2,3}	−11 (73-67-69-68=277)	Playoff	(Australia) Marcus Fraser, (Scotland) Peter Whiteford
5	5 May 2013	Volvo China Open^{4}	−16 (68-67-69-68=272)	4 strokes	(Finland) Mikko Ilonen
6	19 Feb 2017	ISPS Handa World Super 6 Perth^{2,5}	2 and 1		(Thailand) Phachara Khongwatmai

^{1}Dual-ranking event with the Challenge Tour
^{2}Co-sanctioned by the Asian Tour
^{3}Co-sanctioned by the Korean Tour
^{4}Co-sanctioned by the OneAsia Tour
^{5}Co-sanctioned by the PGA Tour of Australasia

European Tour playoff record (2–0)

No.	Year	Tournament	Opponent(s)	Result
1	2007	Omega European Masters	(England) Phillip Archer	Won with birdie on first extra hole
2	2013	Ballantine's Championship	(Australia) Marcus Fraser, (Scotland) Peter Whiteford	Won with eagle on first extra hole

=== Asian Tour wins (2) ===
No.	Date	Tournament	Winning score	Margin of victory	Runner(s)-up
1	28 Apr 2013	Ballantine's Championship^{1,2}	−11 (73-67-69-68=277)	Playoff	(Australia) Marcus Fraser, (Scotland) Peter Whiteford
2	19 Feb 2017	ISPS Handa World Super 6 Perth^{1,3}	2 and 1		(Thailand) Phachara Khongwatmai

^{1}Co-sanctioned by the European Tour
^{2}Co-sanctioned by the Korean Tour
^{3}Co-sanctioned by the PGA Tour of Australasia

Asian Tour playoff record (1–0)

No.	Year	Tournament	Opponents	Result
1	2013	Ballantine's Championship	(Australia) Marcus Fraser, (Scotland) Peter Whiteford	Won with eagle on first extra hole

=== PGA Tour of Australasia wins (3) ===
No.	Date	Tournament	Winning score	Margin of victory	Runner-up
1	5 Dec 1999	ANZ Players Championship (as an amateur)	−12 (68-73-71-68=280)	Playoff	(Australia) Craig Spence
2	1 Nov 2015	TX Civil & Logistics WA PGA Championship	−16 (67-67-67-71=272)	2 strokes	(Australia) Daniel Fox
3	19 Feb 2017	ISPS Handa World Super 6 Perth^{1}	2 and 1		(Thailand) Phachara Khongwatmai

^{1}Co-sanctioned by the European Tour and the Asian Tour

PGA Tour of Australasia playoff record (1–0)

No.	Year	Tournament	Opponent	Result
1	1999	ANZ Players Championship (as an amateur)	(Australia) Craig Spence	Won with birdie on fourth extra hole

=== Challenge Tour wins (1) ===
No.	Date	Tournament	Winning score	Margin of victory	Runner-up
1	15 Jun 2003	Aa St Omer Open^{1}	−15 (64-70-68-67=269)	5 strokes	(England) Ben Mason

^{1}Dual-ranking event with the European Tour

=== Other wins (1) ===
- 2005 Western Australian Open

== Results in major championships ==
Tournament	2001	2002	2003	2004	2005	2006	2007	2008	2009
Masters Tournament									
U.S. Open									
The Open Championship	CUT					T16			
PGA Championship									

Tournament	2010	2011	2012	2013	2014	2015	2016	2017	2018
Masters Tournament									
U.S. Open									
The Open Championship				CUT	CUT	T74			T61
PGA Championship				CUT					

Did not play

CUT = missed the half-way cut
"T" = tied

== Results in World Golf Championships ==
Results not in chronological order before 2015.

Tournament	2004	2005	2006	2007	2008	2009	2010	2011	2012	2013	2014	2015	2016	2017	2018
Championship	T27										66				62
Match Play															
Invitational					T71					T63					
Champions										76					75

Did not play

"T" = tied
Note that the HSBC Champions did not become a WGC event until 2009.

== Team appearances ==
Amateur

- Nomura Cup (representing Australia): 1997, 1999 (winners)
- Eisenhower Trophy (representing Australia): 1998
- Bonallack Trophy (representing Asia/Pacific): 1998

== See also ==
- 2007 PGA Tour Qualifying School graduates
