= 1995 PGA Tour of Australasia =

Golf tour season

1995 PGA Tour of Australasia season
- Duration: 12 January 1995 – 17 December 1995
- Number of official events: 13 (Note: A further three tournaments were scheduled but were cancelled.)
- Most wins: (Australia) Tim Elliott (2) (Australia) Craig Parry (2)
- Order of Merit: (Australia) Craig Parry
- Rookie of the Year: (Australia) Greg Chalmers

The 1995 PGA Tour of Australasia was the 24th season on the PGA Tour of Australasia, the main professional golf tour in Australia and New Zealand since it was formed in 1973.

== Schedule ==
The following table lists official events during the 1995 season.

Date	Tournament	Location	Purse (A$)	Winner (Note: The number in brackets after each winner's name is the number of PGA Tour of Australasia events they had won up to and including that tournament. This information is only shown for PGA Tour of Australasia members.)	OWGR points	Notes
~~8 Jan~~	Canberra Trophy	Australian Capital Territory	–	Cancelled	–	New tournament
15 Jan	AMP Air New Zealand Open	New Zealand	NZ$150,000	(Australia) Lucas Parsons (3)	16	
22 Jan	Optus Players Championship	Victoria	350,000	(Australia) Tim Elliott (1)	16	
5 Feb	Heineken Classic	Western Australia	300,000	(Australia) Robert Allenby (5)	18	
12 Feb	Ford South Australian Open	South Australia	150,000	(Australia) Tim Elliott (2)	16	
19 Feb	Australian Masters	Victoria	562,500	(Australia) Peter Senior (14)	20	
26 Feb	Canon Challenge	New South Wales	350,000	(Australia) Craig Parry (5)	16	
~~15 Oct~~	China PGA Championship	China	–	Cancelled	–	New tournament
5 Nov	Alfred Dunhill Masters	Indonesia	US$400,000	(New Zealand) Michael Campbell (2)	20	
12 Nov	Epson Singapore Open	Singapore	US$400,000	(Australia) Steven Conran (1)	16	
~~19 Nov~~	Australian PGA Championship	New South Wales	–	Cancelled	–	
19 Nov	Victorian Open	Victoria	150,000	(Australia) Stephen Leaney (1)	16	
26 Nov	Heineken Australian Open	Victoria	637,500	(Australia) Greg Norman (30)	36	Flagship event
3 Dec	Greg Norman's Holden Classic	New South Wales	525,000	(Australia) Craig Parry (6)	34	
10 Dec	AMP Air New Zealand Open	New Zealand	NZ$325,000	(Australia) Peter O'Malley (1)	24	
17 Dec	Schweppes Coolum Classic	Queensland	200,000	(Australia) Shane Robinson (2)	16	

== Order of Merit ==
The Order of Merit was based on prize money won during the season, calculated in Australian dollars.

Position	Player	Prize money (A$)
1	(Australia) Craig Parry	334,804
2	(New Zealand) Michael Campbell	207,404
3	(Australia) Peter Senior	180,403
4	(Australia) Steven Conran	150,448
5	(Australia) Peter O'Malley	133,851

== Awards ==
Award	Winner	Ref.
Rookie of the Year	(Australia) Greg Chalmers	
