= Brent Franklin =

Canadian professional golfer (born 1965)

Personal information
- Nationality: Canada
- Born: December 16, 1965 (age 60) Barrie, Ontario, Canada
- Height: 1.85 m (6 ft 1 in)
- Weight: 79 kg (174 lb; 12.4 st)

Career
- Sport: Golf
- College: Brigham Young University
- Status: Professional
- Former tours: Canadian Tour; Japan Golf Tour
- Professional wins: 2

Achievements and awards
- Canadian Golf Hall of Fame: 2010

Brent Franklin (born December 16, 1965) is a former Canadian professional golfer.

== Early life ==
In 1965, Franklin was born in Barrie, Ontario. He was coached in golf by Jack McLaughlin as a youth, and first came to prominence when he won the 1981 Vancouver City Match Play Championship as a 15-year-old amateur, to become the youngest champion ever in that event. The tournament is open to all professionals and top amateurs in the Lower Mainland region.

Franklin won the 1983 and 1984 Canadian Junior Championships.

== Amateur career ==
In 1983, Franklin earned a golf scholarship to Brigham Young University. He won all-American honors three times while at BYU.

During his time at BYU, he also had success at notable Canadian amateur events. He won the 1985 Alberta Amateur Championship. Franklin then won three straight Canadian Amateur Championships, from 1985 to 1987. He was a member of the Canadian team which won the 1986 Eisenhower Trophy, the World Amateur Team Championship, in Venezuela, along with Warren Sye, Jack Kay Jr., and Mark Brewer.

== Professional career ==
In 1988, Franklin turned professional and won the Canadian PGA Championship. That gave him a national championship in Canada at ever-rising levels for seven consecutive seasons. He was selected as Rookie of the Year on the 1988 Canadian Professional Golf Tour, and many thought he would become the next Canadian star on the PGA Tour.

Franklin then moved to the Japan Golf Tour for several years, and posted several strong finishes, including four runner-up results, earning very good prize money. He played 112 Japanese events between 1989 and 1995, and won a total of ¥140,307,935. He did not win a tournament. He lost a playoff to Masashi "Jumbo" Ozaki at the 1992 Dunlop Open.

In 1995, Franklin was planning to move to the PGA Tour but, when cycling in Vancouver, he was hit by a transport truck, and was seriously injured. Franklin was able to recover, and for a time played on the Canadian Professional Golf Tour, trying to regain his earlier form, but was never able to approach the level he had shown earlier.

Franklin currently works as a club professional in Colorado.

== Awards and honors ==
- Franklin earned three All-American selections in golf at BYU: 1985 Honorable Mention, 1986 First Team, and 1987 Second Team.
- In 1988, Franklin earned Rookie of the Year honors on Canadian Tour
- In 2010, Franklin was inducted into the Canadian Golf Hall of Fame.

== Amateur wins ==
- 1983 Canadian Junior Amateur, British Columbia Junior Boys, Vancouver and District Junior, Vancouver Match Play
- 1984 Canadian Junior Amateur, British Columbia Junior Boys
- 1985 Canadian Amateur Championship, Alberta Amateur
- 1986 Canadian Amateur Championship
- 1987 Canadian Amateur Championship

== Professional wins (2) ==
=== Canadian Tour wins (2) ===
No.	Date	Tournament	Winning score	Margin of victory	Runner(s)-up
1	Jul 31, 1988	CPGA Championship	−5 (71-70-71-71=283)	1 stroke	(Canada) Dave Barr
2	Jul 30, 1989	Blue Light Pro-Am	−7 (68-69-72-68=277)	3 strokes	(Canada) Rick Gibson, (United States) Bob McDonnell, (United States) John Morse

== Playoff record ==
PGA of Japan Tour playoff record (0–1)

No.	Year	Tournament	Opponent	Result
1	1992	Dunlop Open	(Japan) Masashi Ozaki	Lost to birdie on first extra hole

== Team appearances ==
this list may be incomplete

Amateur

- Eisenhower Trophy (representing Canada): 1986 (winners)

Professional

- World Cup (representing Canada): 1988, 1992
- Dunhill Cup (representing Canada): 1992
