= 1994 PGA Tour of Australasia =

Golf tour season

1994 PGA Tour of Australasia season
- Duration: 6 January 1994 – 18 December 1994
- Number of official events: 14 (Note: One further tournament was scheduled but was removed from the schedule.)
- Most wins: (United States) Patrick Burke (2) (Australia) Mike Clayton (2)
- Order of Merit: (Australia) Robert Allenby
- Rookie of the Year: (United States) Jack O'Keefe

The 1994 PGA Tour of Australasia was the 23rd season on the PGA Tour of Australasia, the main professional golf tour in Australia and New Zealand since it was formed in 1973.

== Schedule ==
The following table lists official events during the 1994 season.

Date	Tournament	Location	Purse (A$)	Winner (Note: The number in brackets after each winner's name is the number of PGA Tour of Australasia events they had won up to and including that tournament. This information is only shown for PGA Tour of Australasia members.)	OWGR points	Notes
9 Jan	AMP New Zealand Open	New Zealand	NZ$300,000	(Australia) Craig Jones (1)	16	
23 Jan	Optus Players Championship	Victoria	285,000	(United States) Patrick Burke (1)	16	
30 Jan	Heineken Classic	Western Australia	350,000	(Australia) Mike Clayton (5)	24	
~~6 Feb~~	Queensland PGA Championship	Queensland	–	Removed	–	
20 Feb	Microsoft Australian Masters	Victoria	540,000	(Australia) Craig Parry (4)	32	
27 Feb	Canon Challenge	New South Wales	300,000	(Australia) Peter Senior (13)	16	
23 Oct	Foodlink Queensland Open	Queensland	200,000	(Australia) Lucas Parsons (2)	16	
30 Oct	Epson Singapore Open	Singapore	US$400,000	(Myanmar) Kyi Hla Han (1)	16	
6 Nov	Alfred Dunhill Masters	Indonesia	350,000	(Canada) Jack Kay Jr. (1)	36	New tournament
13 Nov	Victorian Open	Victoria	200,000	(United States) Patrick Burke (2)	16	
20 Nov	Reebok Australian PGA Championship	New South Wales	200,000	(Scotland) Andrew Coltart (1)	16	
27 Nov	Heineken Australian Open	New South Wales	637,500	(Australia) Robert Allenby (4)	32	Flagship event
4 Dec	Greg Norman's Holden Classic	Victoria	637,500	(Australia) Anthony Gilligan (1)	28	
11 Dec	Air New Zealand Shell Open	New Zealand	NZ$300,000	(Australia) Shane Robinson (1)	16	
18 Dec	Schweppes Coolum Classic	Queensland	200,000	(Australia) Mike Clayton (6)	16	

== Order of Merit ==
The Order of Merit was based on prize money won during the season, calculated in Australian dollars.

Position	Player	Prize money (A$)
1	(Australia) Robert Allenby	199,645
2	(Australia) Craig Parry	185,920
3	(United States) Patrick Burke	182,571
4	(Australia) Mike Clayton	177,663
5	(Australia) Anthony Gilligan	136,327

== Awards ==
Award	Winner	Ref.
Rookie of the Year	(United States) Jack O'Keefe	
