= Heineken Classic =

Golf tournament

Tournament information
- Location: Melbourne, Australia
- Established: 1990
- Course: Royal Melbourne Golf Club
- Par: 71
- Length: 6,968 yards (6,372 m)
- Tours: PGA Tour of Australasia; European Tour
- Format: Stroke play
- Prize fund: A$2,000,000
- Month played: February
- Final year: 2005

Tournament record score
- Aggregate: 268 Michael Campbell (2000); 268 Ernie Els (2004)
- To par: −20 as above

Final champion
- (Australia) Craig Parry
- Location in Australia Location in Victoria

The Heineken Classic was a men's professional golf tournament played in Australia from 1990 to 2005 as part of the PGA Tour of Australasia. From 1990 to 1992 it was called the Vines Classic.

It was held at The Vines Resort & Country Club in Western Australia from 1990 to 2001 and moved to the Royal Melbourne Golf Club from 2002 to 2005. From 1996 onwards it was co-sanctioned by the European Tour. In 2005 it was the most lucrative golf tournament in Australasia, but the 2006 event was cancelled after the sponsor withdrew and the promoters were unable to find a replacement. This was one of a series of tournaments to be cancelled in Australia within the space of a few years. The winners of the Heineken Classic included former World Number 1s Ernie Els and Ian Woosnam and future U.S. Open champion Michael Campbell.

== Winners ==
Year	Tour(s) (Note: ANZ − PGA Tour of Australasia; EUR − European Tour.)	Winner	Score	To par	Margin of victory	Runner(s)-up
Heineken Classic
2005	ANZ, EUR	(Australia) Craig Parry	270	−14	Playoff	(Australia) Nick O'Hern
2004	ANZ, EUR	(South Africa) Ernie Els (3)	268	−20	1 stroke	(Australia) Adam Scott
2003	ANZ, EUR	(South Africa) Ernie Els (2)	273	−15	1 stroke	(England) Nick Faldo (Australia) Peter Lonard
2002	ANZ, EUR	(South Africa) Ernie Els	271	−17	5 strokes	(Australia) Peter Fowler (England) David Howell (Australia) Peter O'Malley
2001	ANZ, EUR	(New Zealand) Michael Campbell (2)	270	−18	5 strokes	(New Zealand) David Smail
2000	ANZ, EUR	(New Zealand) Michael Campbell	268	−20	6 strokes	(Denmark) Thomas Bjørn
1999	ANZ, EUR	(Australia) Jarrod Moseley	274	−14	1 stroke	(South Africa) Ernie Els (Germany) Bernhard Langer (Australia) Peter Lonard
1998	ANZ, EUR	(Denmark) Thomas Bjørn	280	−8	1 stroke	(Wales) Ian Woosnam
1997	ANZ, EUR	(Spain) Miguel Ángel Martín	273	−15	1 stroke	(United States) Fred Couples
1996	ANZ, EUR	(Wales) Ian Woosnam	277	−11	1 stroke	(Republic of Ireland) Paul McGinley (France) Jean van de Velde
1995	ANZ	(Australia) Robert Allenby	278	−10	1 stroke	(Australia) Wayne Smith
1994	ANZ	(Australia) Mike Clayton	279	−9	3 strokes	(Australia) Wayne Smith
1993	ANZ	(Australia) Peter Senior	275	−13	3 strokes	(New Zealand) Michael Campbell
Vines Classic
1992	ANZ	(Australia) Ian Baker-Finch	276	−12	1 stroke	(United States) Jeff Maggert (New Zealand) Frank Nobilo
1991	ANZ	(United States) Blaine McCallister	278	−10	1 stroke	(Australia) Wayne Grady (New Zealand) Greg Turner
1990	ANZ	(United States) Jeff Maggert	281	−7	1 stroke	(Australia) Brett Ogle
