= 2006 PGA Tour of Australasia =

Golf tour season

2006 PGA Tour of Australasia season
- Duration: 9 February 2006 – 10 December 2006
- Number of official events: 7
- Order of Merit: (Australia) Nick O'Hern

The 2006 PGA Tour of Australasia was the 34th season on the PGA Tour of Australasia, the main professional golf tour in Australia and New Zealand since it was formed in 1973.

== Schedule ==
The following table lists official events during the 2006 season.

Date	Tournament	Location	Purse (A$)	Winner (Note: The number in brackets after each winner's name is the number of PGA Tour of Australasia events they had won up to and including that tournament. This information is only shown for PGA Tour of Australasia members.)	OWGR points	Other tours (Note: AFR − Sunshine Tour; ASA − Asian Tour; EUR − European Tour; NWT − Nationwide Tour.)	Notes
12 Feb	Johnnie Walker Classic	Western Australia	£1,250,000	(United States) Kevin Stadler (n/a)	44	ASA, EUR	
19 Feb	Jacob's Creek Open Championship	South Australia	1,000,000	(Australia) Paul Sheehan (1)	16	NWT	
26 Feb	ING New Zealand PGA Championship	New Zealand	US$600,000	(Canada) Jim Rutledge (n/a)	16	NWT	
19 Nov	MFS Australian Open	New South Wales	1,500,000	(Australia) John Senden (1)	32		Flagship event
26 Nov	MasterCard Masters	Victoria	1,250,000	(England) Justin Rose (n/a)	30	EUR	
3 Dec	Blue Chip New Zealand Open	New Zealand	NZ$1,500,000	(Australia) Nathan Green (2)	20	EUR	
10 Dec	Cadbury Schweppes Australian PGA Championship	Queensland	1,200,000	(Australia) Nick O'Hern (2)	34		

=== Unofficial events ===
The following events were sanctioned by the PGA Tour of Australasia, but did not carry official money, nor were wins official.

Date	Tournament	Location	Purse (A$)	Winner	OWGR points	Other tours	Notes
12 Nov	HSBC Champions	China	US$5,000,000	(South Korea) Yang Yong-eun	52	AFR, (Note: Sunshine Tour unofficial event) ASA, (Note: Asian Tour unofficial event) EUR	Limited-field event

== Order of Merit ==
The Order of Merit was based on prize money won during the season, calculated in Australian dollars.

Position	Player	Prize money (A$)
1	(Australia) Nick O'Hern	583,820
2	(United States) Kevin Stadler	523,098
3	(Australia) Nathan Green	346,108
4	(Australia) Richard Green	343,048
5	(Australia) Paul Sheehan	215,964

== Von Nida Tour ==
2006 Von Nida Tour season
- Duration: 26 January 2006 – 12 November 2006
- Number of official events: 11
- Most wins: (Australia) David Diaz (2) (Australia) Marc Leishman (2) (Australia) Cameron Percy (2)
- Order of Merit: (Australia) Marc Leishman

The 2006 Von Nida Tour was the fourth season of the Von Nida Tour, the official development tour to the PGA Tour of Australasia between 2003 and 2008.

=== Schedule ===
The following table lists official events during the 2006 season.

Date	Tournament	Location	Purse (A$)	Winner (Note: The number in brackets after each winner's name is the number of Von Nida Tour events they had won up to and including that tournament. It is rare for someone to accumulate many wins on the Von Nida Tour as success at this level usually leads to promotion to the PGA Tour of Australasia.)	Ref.
29 Jan	National Australia Bank Victorian PGA Championship	Victoria	105,000	(Australia) Steven Jeffress (1)	
5 Feb	Victorian Open	Victoria	110,000	(Australia) David Diaz (1)	
12 Mar	Bega Cheese NSW PGA Championship	New South Wales	110,000	(Australia) Paul Marantz (1)	
19 Mar	Toyota Southern Classic	New South Wales	100,000	(Australia) Marc Leishman (1)	
5 May	South Australian PGA Championship	South Australia	100,000	(Australia) David Diaz (2)	
28 May	Western Australia PGA Championship	Western Australia	100,000	(Australia) Andrew Pitt (1)	
15 Oct	North QLD X-Ray Services Cairns Classic	Queensland	105,000	(Australia) Marc Leishman (2)	
22 Oct	Minniecon & Burke Queensland Masters	Queensland	105,000	(Australia) Cameron Percy (2)	
29 Oct	Roadcon Group Queensland Open	Queensland	105,000	(Australia) Ricky Schmidt (1)	
5 Nov	Greater Building Society QLD PGA Championship	Queensland	105,000	(Australia) Cameron Percy (3)	
12 Nov	Proton New South Wales Open	New South Wales	125,000	(Australia) Rick Kulacz (a) (1)	

=== Order of Merit ===
The Order of Merit was based on prize money won during the season, calculated in Australian dollars. The top 10 players on the Order of Merit earned status to play on the 2007 PGA Tour of Australasia.

Position	Player	Prize money (A$)
1	(Australia) Marc Leishman	54,679
2	(Australia) Cameron Percy	45,613
3	(Australia) David Diaz	35,810
4	(Australia) Tony McFadyean	23,749
5	(Australia) Ricky Schmidt	23,454
