= 1999–2000 PGA Tour of Australasia =

Golf tour season

1999–2000 PGA Tour of Australasia season
- Duration: 11 November 1999 – 5 March 2000
- Number of official events: 12
- Most wins: (New Zealand) Michael Campbell (4)
- Order of Merit: (New Zealand) Michael Campbell
- Player of the Year: (New Zealand) Michael Campbell
- Rookie of the Year: (Australia) Brett Rumford

The 1999–2000 PGA Tour of Australasia was the 28th season on the PGA Tour of Australasia, the main professional golf tour in Australia and New Zealand since it was formed in 1973.

== Schedule ==
The following table lists official events during the 1999–2000 season.

| Date | Tournament | Location | Purse (A$) | Winner (Note: The number in brackets after each winner's name is the number of PGA Tour of Australasia events they had won up to and including that tournament. This information is only shown for PGA Tour of Australasia members.) | OWGR points | Other tours (Note: ASA − Asian PGA Tour; EUR − European Tour.) | Notes |
|---|---|---|---|---|---|---|---|
| 14 Nov | Johnnie Walker Classic | Taiwan | £800,000 | (New Zealand) Michael Campbell (3) | 28 | ASA, EUR | |
| 21 Nov | Ford South Australian Open | South Australia | 600,000 | (Australia) Craig Parry (9) | 16 | | |
| 28 Nov | Holden Australian Open | New South Wales | 1,000,000 | (Australia) Aaron Baddeley (a) (1) | 32 | | Flagship event |
| 5 Dec | ANZ Players Championship | Queensland | 800,000 | (Australia) Brett Rumford (a) (1) | 16 | | |
| 12 Dec | Australian PGA Championship | Victoria | 600,000 | (New Zealand) Greg Turner (6) | 16 | | |
| 19 Dec | Schweppes Coolum Classic | Queensland | 300,000 | (Australia) Nick O'Hern (1) | 16 | | |
| 23 Jan | Crown Lager New Zealand Open | New Zealand | NZ$500,000 | (New Zealand) Michael Campbell (4) | 16 | | |
| 30 Jan | Heineken Classic | Western Australia | 1,600,000 | (New Zealand) Michael Campbell (5) | 36 | EUR | |
| 6 Feb | Greg Norman Holden International | New South Wales | 2,000,000 | (Australia) Lucas Parsons (4) | 34 | EUR | |
| 13 Feb | Ericsson Masters | Victoria | 800,000 | (New Zealand) Michael Campbell (6) | 18 | | |
| 20 Feb | Canon Challenge | New South Wales | 550,000 | (Australia) Paul Gow (1) | 16 | | |
| 5 Mar | ANZ Tour Championship | Australian Capital Territory | 500,000 | (Australia) Andre Stolz (1) | 16 | | Tour Championship |

== Order of Merit ==
The Order of Merit was based on prize money won during the season, calculated in Australian dollars.

| Position | Player | Prize money (A$) |
|---|---|---|
| 1 | (New Zealand) Michael Campbell | 936,810 |
| 2 | (Australia) Lucas Parsons | 407,515 |
| 3 | (Australia) Peter Senior | 367,076 |
| 4 | (Australia) Nick O'Hern | 330,788 |
| 5 | (Australia) Geoff Ogilvy | 291,523 |

== Awards ==
| Award | Winner | Ref. |
|---|---|---|
| Player of the Year | (New Zealand) Michael Campbell | |
| Rookie of the Year (Norman Von Nida Shield) | (Australia) Brett Rumford | |

== Australasian Development Tour ==
2000 Australasian Development Tour season
- Duration: 2 May 2000 – 22 October 2000
- Number of official events: 10
- Most wins: (Australia) David Bransdon (2) (Australia) Matthew Habgood (2)
- Order of Merit: (Australia) David Bransdon

The 2000 Australasian Development Tour was the inaugural season of the Australasian Development Tour, the official development tour of the PGA Tour of Australasia between 2000 and 2001.

=== Schedule ===
The following table lists official events during the 2000 season.

| Date | Tournament | Location | Purse (A$) | Winner (Note: The number in brackets after each winner's name is the number of Australasian Development Tour events they had won up to and including that tournament. It is rare for someone to accumulate many wins on the Australasian Development Tour as success at this level usually leads to promotion to the PGA Tour of Australasia.) | Ref. |
|---|---|---|---|---|---|
| 5 May | Schweppes South Australian PGA Championship | South Australia | 100,000 | (Australia) Chris Gray (1) | |
| 21 May | Heineken Western Australian Open | Western Australia | 100,000 | (Australia) Paul Sheehan (1) | |
| 28 May | WA PGA Championship | Western Australia | 100,000 | (Australia) Matthew Habgood (1) | |
| 25 Jun | Polynesian Airlines Samoa Open | Samoa | 100,000 | (Australia) David Bransdon (1) | |
| 23 Jul | Tahiti Open | Tahiti | 100,000 | (Australia) David Bransdon (2) | |
| 30 Jul | New Caledonia Open | New Caledonia | 100,000 | (New Zealand) Matthew Laroche (1) | |
| 6 Aug | Tusker Vanuatu Open | Vanuatu | 100,000 | (Australia) Ed Stedman (1) | |
| 7 Oct | Eastern Australia Airlines Big Sky Country Open | New South Wales | 100,000 | (Australia) Wayne Perske (1) | |
| 15 Oct | Crown Victorian PGA Championship | Victoria | 100,000 | (Australia) Matthew Habgood (2) | |
| 22 Oct | Toyota Southern Classic | New South Wales | 100,000 | (Australia) Scott Hend (1) | |
