= Nick O'Hern =

Australian professional golfer (born 1971)

Personal information
- Full name: Nicholas Simon O'Hern
- Nationality: Australia
- Born: 18 October 1971 (age 55) Perth, Western Australia
- Height: 1.85 m (6 ft 1 in)

Career
- Sport: Golf
- Turned professional: 1994
- Current tour: PGA Tour of Australasia
- Former tours: PGA Tour; European Tour; Web.com Tour
- Professional wins: 6
- Highest ranking: 16 (28 January 2007)

Number of wins by tour
- PGA Tour of Australasia: 2
- Other: 4

Best results in major championships
- Masters Tournament: T19: 2006
- PGA Championship: T31: 2004
- U.S. Open: T6: 2006
- The Open Championship: T15: 2005

Achievements and awards
- PGA Tour of Australasia Order of Merit winner: 2006

Nicholas Simon O'Hern (born 18 October 1971) is an Australian professional golfer. O'Hern has played on both of the world's premier professional golf tours, the European Tour, and the United States–based PGA Tour. His biggest successes, though, have come at home on the PGA Tour of Australasia, where he won the Order of Merit as the leading money winner in 2006.

== Early life ==
O'Hern was born in Perth, Australia. His father was a three-handicap golfer who played baseball for Australia and he followed him by playing baseball for Western Australia. He was also a talented tennis player but he chose to concentrate on golf.

== Professional career ==
O'Hern took up golf at the age of nine and plays left-handed. He turned professional in 1994. He was successful at the European Tour qualifying school at his first attempt in 1998 and played regularly on the European Tour from 1999 through 2007. He has not won on the European Tour, but had two second-place finishes in 2003, two more in 2004 and one each in 2005, 2006 and 2007.

In 2005, O'Hern began to play quite regularly in the United States. He was not a member of the PGA Tour, but having reached the top twenty of the Official World Golf Rankings, he received a substantial number of invitations and sponsors exemptions for PGA Tour events. In 2006 he became a member of the PGA Tour on the basis of his membership of the International Team at the 2005 Presidents Cup, and has since played mostly on that tour.

Also in 2006, O'Hern won the Australian PGA Championship, after he holed out from the greenside bunker for birdie on the fourth hole of a two-man play-off with Peter Lonard. The win brought to an end a seven-year drought for O'Hern, and propelled him to the top of the PGA Tour of Australasia's Order of Merit for 2006. He has won five tournaments in Australia, and continues to play on the PGA Tour of Australasia during the northern hemisphere winter.

O'Hern has featured in the top 20 of the Official World Golf Rankings, and he is the only player who has beaten Tiger Woods in matchplay more than once. He is coached by Neil Simpson of the Mount Lawley Golf Club in Perth, Western Australia.

Knee surgery ended O'Hern's 2010 season after 11 events. He started the 2011 season on a medical exemption. O'Hern satisfied his medical exemption in May 2011 with four events remaining to retain his PGA Tour status. On 6 June, O'Hern went through sectional qualifying and secured a spot in the 2011 U.S. Open.

O'Hern never won on the PGA Tour; his best finish is a tie for second at the 2006 Booz Allen Classic.

O'Hern's ball marking has become famous because of its originality. In an ode to his native Australia, O'Hern marks his Titleist Pro V1 with a drawn-on kangaroo. The marking has been featured in Titleist advertisements.

== Personal life ==
O'Hern is married and has two daughters. He resides in Melbourne, Australia. In 2016, he published a book entitled Tour Mentality: Inside the Mind of a Golf Pro.

== Amateur wins ==
- 1991 Mount Lawley Championship

== Professional wins (6) ==
=== PGA Tour of Australasia wins (2) ===
No.	Date	Tournament	Winning score	Margin of victory	Runner-up
1	19 Dec 1999	Schweppes Coolum Classic	−10 (71-66-69=206) (Note: Shortened to 54 holes due to weather.)	2 strokes	(Australia) Wayne Smith
2	10 Dec 2006	Cadbury Schweppes Australian PGA Championship	−22 (66-69-63-68=266)	Playoff	(Australia) Peter Lonard

PGA Tour of Australasia playoff record (1–1)

No.	Year	Tournament	Opponent	Result
1	2005	Heineken Classic	(Australia) Craig Parry	Lost to birdie on fourth extra hole
2	2006	Cadbury Schweppes Australian PGA Championship	(Australia) Peter Lonard	Won with birdie on fourth extra hole

=== Other wins (4) ===
- 1997 Port Hedland PGA Classic
- 1998 Port Hedland PGA Classic, South West Open
- 1999 Nedlands Masters

== Playoff record ==
European Tour playoff record (0–1)

No.	Year	Tournament	Opponent	Result
1	2005	Heineken Classic	(Australia) Craig Parry	Lost to birdie on fourth extra hole

== Results in major championships ==
Tournament	2000	2001	2002	2003	2004	2005	2006	2007	2008	2009
Masters Tournament						T45	T19	CUT	CUT	
U.S. Open						T49	T6	T23		
The Open Championship	T41			CUT		T15	CUT	CUT	T32	
PGA Championship		CUT			T31	CUT	CUT	T50	CUT	

Tournament	2010	2011
Masters Tournament		
U.S. Open		CUT
The Open Championship		
PGA Championship		

Top 10
Did not play

CUT = missed the half-way cut
"T" = tied

=== Summary ===
Tournament	Wins	2nd	3rd	Top-5	Top-10	Top-25	Events	Cuts made
Masters Tournament	0	0	0	0	0	1	4	2
U.S. Open	0	0	0	0	1	2	4	3
The Open Championship	0	0	0	0	0	1	6	3
PGA Championship	0	0	0	0	0	0	6	2
Totals	0	0	0	0	1	4	20	10

- Most consecutive cuts made – 4 (2004 PGA – 2005 Open Championship)
- Longest streak of top-10s – 1

== Results in The Players Championship ==
Tournament	2005	2006	2007	2008	2009	2010	2011	2012
The Players Championship	T24	CUT	CUT	T32	T49	CUT	CUT	CUT

CUT = missed the halfway cut
"T" indicates a tie for a place

== Results in World Golf Championships ==
Tournament	2001	2002	2003	2004	2005	2006	2007	2008	2009
Match Play	QF				QF	R32	QF	R32	
Championship	NT^{1}			T28	T56	T26	T6	T6	
Invitational					T28	T31	T56	T27	T45
Champions									

^{1}Cancelled due to 9/11

Top 10
Did not play

QF, R16, R32, R64 = Round in which player lost in match play
"T" = Tied
NT = No tournament
Note that the HSBC Champions did not become a WGC event until 2009.

== Team appearances ==
- Alfred Dunhill Cup (representing Australia): 2000
- World Cup (representing Australia): 2004, 2007
- Presidents Cup (International team): 2005, 2007
