= Bradley Hughes (golfer) =

Australian professional golfer (born 1967)

Personal information
- Nationality: Australia
- Born: 10 February 1967 (age 59) Melbourne, Australia
- Height: 1.75 m (5 ft 9 in)
- Weight: 89 kg (196 lb; 14.0 st)

Career
- Sport: Golf
- Turned professional: 1988
- Former tours: PGA Tour; European Tour; Japan Golf Tour; PGA Tour of Australasia; Nationwide Tour
- Professional wins: 7
- Highest ranking: 98 (6 June 1999)

Number of wins by tour
- Asian Tour: 1
- PGA Tour of Australasia: 4
- Korn Ferry Tour: 1
- Other: 2

Best results in major championships
- Masters Tournament: CUT: 1998
- PGA Championship: CUT: 1999
- U.S. Open: T16: 1997
- The Open Championship: T45: 1996

Achievements and awards
- PGA Tour of Australia Rookie of the Year: 1988

Bradley Hughes (born 10 February 1967) is an Australian professional golfer.

== Amateur career ==
Hughes was born in Melbourne. As an amateur golfer, he won the 1987 and 1988 Victorian Amateur Championship, the 1988 New Zealand Amateur and represented Australia in several competitions including the 1988 Eisenhower Trophy.

== Professional career ==
Hughes turned professional in October 1988. He finished in 7th place at his first event, the Tasmanian Open, 12th place in his second event, the New South Wales Open, and then took the title in his third event, the Western Australian Open.

He has played on the PGA Tour of Australasia (1988–), European Tour (1990, 1996), Japan Golf Tour (1992–1994), PGA Tour (1997–2002, 2005) and Nationwide Tours (2003–2004, 2006). He participated in the 1994 Presidents Cup for the international team; he was a last-minute replacement for Greg Norman. Hughes remains the lowest-ranked player ever to compete in the Presidents Cup, 117th at the time of selection.

Hughes quit playing competitive golf near the end of 2008 and now teaches at Holly Tree CC in Greenville, South Carolina. He has been credited with helping the resurgence of Brendon Todd on the PGA Tour. He also coaches Brandt Snedeker, Harold Varner III, Cameron Percy, Greg Chalmers, Ben Martin, Robert Allenby Luke Donald and Ollie Schniederjans as well as a host of mini-tour players.

== Professional wins (7) ==
=== PGA Tour of Australasia wins (4) ===
No.	Date	Tournament	Winning score	Margin of victory	Runner(s)-up
1	30 Oct 1988	Town and Country Western Australian Open	−4 (71-71-67-75=284)	1 stroke	(Australia) Ken Trimble
2	21 Feb 1993	Microsoft Australian Masters	−11 (70-72-73-66=281)	Playoff	(Australia) Peter Senior
3	27 Oct 1996	Australian Players Championship^{1}	−14 (70-65-66-69=270)	12 strokes	(Australia) Peter Lonard, (Australia) Robert Stephens
4	15 Feb 1998	Ericsson Masters (2)	−24 (63-72-66-67=268)	5 strokes	(Australia) Mathew Goggin

^{1}Co-sanctioned by the Asian PGA Tour

PGA Tour of Australasia playoff record (1–0)

No.	Year	Tournament	Opponent	Result
1	1993	Microsoft Australian Masters	(Australia) Peter Senior	Won with par on first extra hole

=== Nationwide Tour wins (1) ===
No.	Date	Tournament	Winning score	Margin of victory	Runners-up
1	1 Aug 2004	Preferred Health Systems Wichita Open	−14 (71-65-69-65=270)	Playoff	(United States) Erik Compton, (United States) Hunter Haas, (United States) Scott Harrington

Nationwide Tour playoff record (1–0)

No.	Year	Tournament	Opponents	Result
1	2004	Preferred Health Systems Wichita Open	(United States) Erik Compton, (United States) Hunter Haas, (United States) Scott Harrington	Won with birdie on first extra hole

=== TRGA Tour wins (1) ===
- 2011 TRGA Las Vegas Classic

=== Foundation Tour wins (1) ===
- 1991 South Australian PGA Championship

== Playoff record ==
PGA of Japan Tour playoff record (0–1)

No.	Year	Tournament	Opponents	Result
1	1992	Daiwa KBC Augusta	(Taiwan) Chen Tze-ming, (Japan) Norikazu Kawakami	Chen won with birdie on first extra hole

== Results in major championships ==
Tournament	1994	1995	1996	1997	1998	1999	2000	2001	2002	2003	2004	2005	2006
Masters Tournament					CUT								
U.S. Open	T39	T45		T16		CUT							
The Open Championship	CUT		T45			T49							CUT
PGA Championship						CUT							

Did not play

CUT = missed the half-way cut
"T" = tied

== Team appearances ==
Amateur

- Nomura Cup (representing Australia): 1987
- Eisenhower Trophy (representing Australia): 1988
- Sloan Morpeth Trophy (representing Australia): 1988 (winners)
- Australian Men's Interstate Teams Matches (representing Victoria): 1986 (winners), 1987 (winners), 1988

Professional

- Presidents Cup (International team): 1994
- World Cup (representing Australia): 1996, 1997

== See also ==
- 1996 PGA Tour Qualifying School graduates
- 1997 PGA Tour Qualifying School graduates
- 2004 Nationwide Tour graduates
