= Greg Chalmers =

Australian professional golfer (born 1973)

Personal information
- Full name: Gregory John Chalmers
- Nickname: Snake
- Nationality: Australia
- Born: 11 October 1973 (age 53) Sydney, Australia
- Height: 1.80 m (5 ft 11 in)
- Weight: 95 kg (209 lb; 15.0 st)
- Spouse: Nicole
- Children: 2

Career
- Sport: Golf
- Turned professional: 1995
- Current tour: PGA Tour Champions
- Former tours: PGA Tour; European Tour; Web.com Tour; PGA Tour of Australasia
- Professional wins: 11
- Highest ranking: 53 (9 September 2012)

Number of wins by tour
- PGA Tour: 1
- PGA Tour of Australasia: 5
- Korn Ferry Tour: 2
- Challenge Tour: 1
- Other: 2

Best results in major championships
- Masters Tournament: CUT: 2001
- PGA Championship: T4: 2000
- U.S. Open: CUT: 2002, 2011
- The Open Championship: T45: 2012

Achievements and awards
- PGA Tour of Australasia Rookie of the Year: 1995
- PGA Tour of Australasia Order of Merit winner: 2011, 2014

Gregory John Chalmers (born 11 October 1973) is an Australian professional golfer. Chalmers has played primarily on the PGA Tour of Australasia and PGA Tour. He is a two-time winner of the Australian Open and late in his career eventually won a PGA Tour event, the 2016 Barracuda Championship.

== Amateur career ==
Chalmers was born in Sydney. He won the 1993 Australian Amateur and the 1994 French Amateur.

== Professional career ==
Chalmers turned professional in 1995 and made a strong start to his professional career, winning four times in Australia in the next few years, including the 1998 Australian Open. In Europe he won the second-tier Challenge Tour's Challenge Tour Championship, in 1997 and finished 25th on the European Tour Order of Merit in 1998. The same year he finished fourth at 1998 PGA Tour Qualifying School to win a PGA Tour card for 1999.

A poor 2004 season saw him lose his card, but he won the 2005 Albertsons Boise Open on the Nationwide Tour and returned to the main PGA Tour in 2006. Chalmers struggled in 2006, making only 8 cuts and did not maintain his status and played on the Nationwide Tour during 2007 and 2008. He finished 8th on the money list in the 2008 season to gain his PGA Tour card for the 2009 season.

In 2011, Chalmers won the Australian Open for the second time in his career, 13 years after he won his first. He held off late charges by John Senden and Tiger Woods to claim victory. He followed this up with a win at the Australian PGA Championship, to take the second Australian major of the year. He defeated Robert Allenby and Marcus Fraser in a sudden death playoff to take the title. These wins led him to win the PGA Tour of Australasia Order of Merit. He also became only the second player to have a chance of winning the Australian "triple-crown" but could not claim the Australian Masters title, an event that still eludes him.

In December 2014, Chalmers won his second Australian PGA Championship title in a sudden death playoff. He came from seven strokes back during the final round after a flawless round of 64 to enter a playoff with Wade Ormsby and Adam Scott on 11 under. In a marathon playoff which was the longest in tournament history, Ormsby was eliminated at the third extra hole, with Chalmers and Scott going as far as seven extra holes. On the seventh extra hole, Scott three putted from 30 feet for bogey to allow Chalmers to take the victory. This was his fifth title on the PGA Tour of Australasia and tenth overall professional level victory. He also claimed the year end Order of Merit title for the second time his career.

Chalmers started the 2015-16 PGA Tour season with only veteran member status and alternated between the PGA Tour and Web.com Tour. He earned his first PGA Tour win at the Barracuda Championship after 18 years and 386 PGA Tour starts, which was the most among active PGA Tour players without a win and one of the longest waits in Tour history. Chalmers and 2013 winner Gary Woodland were tied before the 18th hole. Woodland bogeyed the last hole and Chalmers eagled the par-five 18th, which meant a six-point victory under the tournament's Modified Stableford scoring system. Previously, his best PGA Tour finishes were second at the 2000 Kemper Insurance Open and at the 2009 Buick Open. At 42, Chalmers was also the season's oldest Tour winner. He is also only the 12th left-hander to win a PGA Tour event. Prior to his win, Chalmers was 229th in the FedEx Cup and 490th in the world. The win moved him to 231st in the world and earned him a two-year exemption that also included entry into the 2016 Open Championship as an Open Qualifying Series event after the Greenbrier Classic was cancelled. Chalmers finished 142nd in the FedEx Cup and did not qualify for the postseason, but the win made him fully exempt through the 2017–18 season.

Chalmers was unable to follow up his win and cut his 2018 season short due to arthritis in his back. He made no starts in 2019 and played with a Major Medical Extension until 2020, when he was unable to meet the terms and was demoted to the Past Champions Category.

Chalmers had a career best world ranking of 53rd in 2012. His career best FedEx Cup ranking was 35th in 2012.

Outside of golf, Chalmers runs a Dallas-area charity for autistic children called Maximum Chances, whose name is derived from one of Chalmers' sons.

== Amateur wins ==
- 1993 Australian Amateur
- 1994 French Amateur

== Professional wins (11) ==
=== PGA Tour wins (1) ===
No.	Date	Tournament	Winning score	Margin of victory	Runner-up
1	3 Jul 2016	Barracuda Championship	43 pts (14-10-15-4=43)	6 points	(United States) Gary Woodland

=== PGA Tour of Australasia wins (5) ===
Legend
Flagship events (2)
Other PGA Tour of Australasia (3)

No.	Date	Tournament	Winning score	Margin of victory	Runner(s)-up
1	7 Dec 1997	Australasian Players Championship	−15 (71-70-67-68=276)	1 stroke	(Australia) Peter Lonard
2	6 Dec 1998	Holden Australian Open	E (71-73-74-70=288)	1 stroke	(Australia) Stuart Appleby, (Australia) Peter Senior
3	13 Nov 2011	Emirates Australian Open^{1} (2)	−13 (67-72-67-67=275)	1 stroke	(Australia) John Senden
4	27 Nov 2011	Australian PGA Championship^{1}	−12 (71-69-69-67=276)	Playoff	(Australia) Robert Allenby, (Australia) Marcus Fraser
5	14 Dec 2014	Australian PGA Championship^{1} (2)	−11 (71-71-71-64=277)	Playoff	(Australia) Wade Ormsby, (Australia) Adam Scott

^{1}Co-sanctioned by the OneAsia Tour

PGA Tour of Australasia playoff record (2–1)

No.	Year	Tournament	Opponents	Result
1	2004	MasterCard Masters	(Australia) Richard Green, (Australia) David McKenzie	Green won with birdie on first extra hole
2	2011	Australian PGA Championship	(Australia) Robert Allenby, (Australia) Marcus Fraser	Won with par on first extra hole
3	2014	Australian PGA Championship	(Australia) Wade Ormsby, (Australia) Adam Scott	Won with par on seventh extra hole Ormsby eliminated by birdie on third hole

=== Nationwide Tour wins (2) ===
No.	Date	Tournament	Winning score	Margin of victory	Runner-up
1	25 Sep 2005	Albertsons Boise Open	−15 (66-65-69-69=269)	Playoff	(United States) Danny Ellis
2	27 Apr 2008	Henrico County Open	−14 (68-68-68-70=274)	Playoff	(Norway) Henrik Bjørnstad

Nationwide Tour playoff record (2–0)

No.	Year	Tournament	Opponent	Result
1	2005	Albertsons Boise Open	(United States) Danny Ellis	Won with birdie on first extra hole
2	2008	Henrico County Open	(Norway) Henrik Bjørnstad	Won with bogey on second extra hole

=== Challenge Tour wins (1) ===
No.	Date	Tournament	Winning score	Margin of victory	Runner-up
1	10 Aug 1997	Challenge Tour Championship	−14 (73-68-68-65=274)	Playoff	(Germany) Heinz-Peter Thül

Challenge Tour playoff record (1–1)

No.	Year	Tournament	Opponent	Result
1	1997	Audi Quattro Trophy	(England) David A. Russell	Lost to birdie on first extra hole
2	1997	Challenge Tour Championship	(Germany) Heinz-Peter Thül	Won with par on second extra hole

=== Australasian Foundation Tour wins (2) ===
- 1995 Western Australia PGA Championship, Nedlands Masters

== Results in major championships ==
Tournament	1998	1999
Masters Tournament		
U.S. Open		
The Open Championship	T57	
PGA Championship	CUT	

Tournament	2000	2001	2002	2003	2004	2005	2006	2007	2008	2009
Masters Tournament		CUT								
U.S. Open			CUT							
The Open Championship										
PGA Championship	T4	T44								

Tournament	2010	2011	2012	2013	2014	2015	2016
Masters Tournament							
U.S. Open		CUT					
The Open Championship			T45			T58	81
PGA Championship			T32				CUT

Top 10
Did not play

CUT = missed the half-way cut
"T" = tied

== Results in The Players Championship ==
Tournament	2000	2001	2002	2003	2004	2005	2006	2007	2008	2009	2010	2011	2012	2013	2014	2015	2016	2017
The Players Championship	T9	T58	CUT	CUT							T34	T41	CUT	T37	CUT			CUT

Top 10
Did not play

CUT = missed the halfway cut
"T" indicates a tie for a place

== Results in World Golf Championships ==
Results not in chronological order before 2015.

Tournament	2001	2002	2003	2004	2005	2006	2007	2008	2009	2010	2011	2012	2013	2014	2015
Championship	NT^{1}											T20			T49
Match Play	R64											R64			
Invitational												T55			
Champions									T45			T46			T58

^{1}Cancelled due to 9/11

Did not play

QF, R16, R32, R64 = Round in which player lost in match play
"T" = Tied
NT = No tournament
Note that the HSBC Champions did not become a WGC event until 2009.

== Team appearances ==
Amateur

- Eisenhower Trophy (representing Australia): 1994

== See also ==
- 1998 PGA Tour Qualifying School graduates
- 2005 Nationwide Tour graduates
- 2008 Nationwide Tour graduates
