= PGA Tour of Australasia =

Golf tour in Australia

- Current season, competition or edition: 2026–27 PGA Tour of Australasia
- Formerly: PGA Tour of Australia
- Sport: Golf
- Founded: 1973 (renamed PGA Tour of Australasia in 1991)
- Countries: Based in Australia and New Zealand (Note: Schedules have also included events in China, Fiji, Hong Kong, India, Indonesia, Malaysia, New Caledonia, Papua New Guinea, Singapore, Taiwan and Thailand.)
- Most titles: Order of Merit titles: (Australia) Greg Norman (6)
- Broadcasters: Nine Network (Australia); Fox Sports (Australia); Sky Sport (New Zealand); TV3 (New Zealand)
- Related competitions: Von Nida Tour
- Website: https://www.pga.org.au/

The PGA Tour of Australasia, currently titled as the Challenger PGA Tour of Australasia for sponsorship reasons, is a professional golf tour for men, owned and operated by the PGA of Australia. Official events on the tour count for World Golf Ranking points.

== History ==
The tour is recognised as being founded in 1973 when the PGA of Australia instituted an Order of Merit. Despite always including at least one tournament in New Zealand, the tour was known as the PGA Tour of Australia until it adopted its current name in 1991 following the inclusion of three events in Asia.

Most of the leading players on the tour are Australian, with a smaller domestic contingent from New Zealand, but players from many other countries all over the world also participate. The very best Australasian players devote most of their time to the PGA Tour or the European Tour, typically returning home for events after the European and North American seasons end in mid-November, if they choose to play tournaments at home. Therefore, the Australasian Tour is a feeder for the larger tours with its Order of Merit offering a pathway to global tours. Some of the leading events are co-sanctioned by the DP World Tour to encourage higher ranked players to enter and to attract more sponsorship. Players with a background on the tour who have reached the world top 20 since the turn of the Millennium include Jason Day, Steve Elkington, Geoff Ogilvy and Adam Scott. The leading tournaments on the tour include the Australian Open, the Australian PGA Championship and the New Zealand Open.

In November 2005 it was reported by the BBC that the tour was going through difficult times, with the schedule for the 2005/06 summer season reduced to six events, three of them co-sponsored by other tours. The Heineken Classic, which was the richest event in Australasia in 2005, was cancelled in 2006 due to the withdrawal of the sponsor. One factor in the tour's problems is the rise of the nearby Asian Tour. Tour chairman Wayne Grady, and player Mark Hensby both accused Australia's biggest golf icon Greg Norman, who is a US resident, of not doing enough to support the tour. Norman dismissed their comments.

To earn a PGA Tour of Australasia card, one must place in the top 26 of the tour's qualifying schools. To retain a Tour card, a golfer must finish in the top 50 of the Order of Merit. Golfers ranked 51st–70th are given conditional status and those ranked 71st to 100th are given entry to the final stage of Q School. Five-year exemptions are given to Order of Merit winners each season and three-year exemptions should a player win either of the following major events - Australian PGA Championship, Australian Open and New Zealand Open. Entry to The Open Championship is given to the Order of Merit winner.

The top player on the Order of Merit at the end of the season earns status to play on the European Tour for the following season.

== OneAsia Tour ==
In January 2009, it was announced that there would be a new series of events across the Asia-Pacific region, to be organised by the PGA Tour of Australasia in co-operation with China Golf Association, the Japan Golf Tour, the Korean Golf Association and the Korean PGA. The aim of these events would be to raise the profile of professional golf in the region, and compete with the likes of the European Tour. The series would initially consist of six events, three in China, two in Australia and one in South Korea, with plans to expand to at least thirteen in 2010 as events in Japan were added, and over 20 by 2011.

The introduction of the OneAsia series has not been universally welcomed, with strong opposition coming from the Asian Tour in particular, with support from its members. All of the six events announced for 2009 were existing tournaments, including some already sanctioned by the Asian Tour. One of them, the Pine Valley Beijing Open, was called off a few weeks before it was due to be held. The organisers officially attributed this decision to the state of the course and a clash of dates with The Players Championship on the US-based PGA Tour, but some media commentators dismissed these reasons since the tournament had clashed with the Players Championship the previous year as well, and attributed the cancellation to sponsor discontent with the sanctioning changes.

OneAsia was discussed at the annual meeting of the International Federation of PGA Tours during the 2009 Masters Tournament. The Series would need to become a member of the Federation if it wishes to be able to award Official World Golf Ranking points in its own right. Points are currently available in all events due to those conferred by the PGA Tour of Australasia and the European Tour, as the Chinese and Korean tours are not Federation members. Under present arrangements it is unlikely that any new tournaments launched by OneAsia will receive ranking points, and could prove difficult to attract top players without them. At the meeting OneAsia and the Asian Tour both claimed that the game's powerbrokers understood the strength of their case, but neither received any public endorsements from the others members.

== Schedule ==
PGA Tour of Australasia events have mainly been held in Australia, New Zealand and Papua New Guinea although in past seasons, tournaments that have been co-sanctioned with other tours, such as the Johnnie Walker Classic, have been held in several other countries, including India and Thailand.

There was a significant increase in the number of regular season tournaments in 2009, following the integration of the former Von Nida Tour events. Typically, only tournaments that were on the tour schedule prior to the merger were eligible for world ranking points. Beginning in 2012, all events will carry world ranking points, with the "State Based and Regional Tournaments" receiving a minimum of 6 points, compared with 16 points for regular events. The tour's flagship event, the Australian Open, awards a minimum of 32 points to the winner.

The tour's richest events are those that are co-sanctioned by the larger global tours, such as the European Tour.

=== Australian Triple Crown ===
In Australia, the Triple Crown referred to winning the three major domestic championships, the Australian Open, the Australian Masters and the Australian PGA Championship. Winning all three titles in the same season was a feat only achieved by Robert Allenby in 2005.

== Order of Merit winners ==
Season	Winner	Points
2025–26	(Australia) Travis Smyth	969
2024–25	(Australia) Elvis Smylie	1,359
2023–24	(New Zealand) Kazuma Kobori	841
2022–23	(Australia) David Micheluzzi	1,455
Season	Winner	Prize money (A$)
2021–22	(Australia) Jediah Morgan	190,409
2020–21	(Australia) Brad Kennedy	302,480
2019	(New Zealand) Ryan Fox	307,925
2018	(Australia) Jake McLeod	255,326
2017	(Australia) Brett Rumford	313,094
2016	(Australia) Matthew Griffin	239,445
2015	(Australia) Nathan Holman	346,702
2014	(Australia) Greg Chalmers (2)	254,525
2013	(Australia) Adam Scott (2)	538,620
2012	(Australia) Peter Senior (4)	268,292
2011	(Australia) Greg Chalmers	554,285
2010	(Australia) Geoff Ogilvy	459,900
2009	(Australia) Michael Sim	315,088
2008	(New Zealand) Mark Brown	440,027
2007	(Australia) Craig Parry (3)	442,004
2006	(Australia) Nick O'Hern	583,820
2005	(Australia) Adam Scott	545,429
2004	(Australia) Richard Green	365,017
2003	(Australia) Peter Lonard (2)	604,000
2002	(Australia) Craig Parry (2)	641,789
2000–01	(Australia) Aaron Baddeley	662,125
1999–2000	(New Zealand) Michael Campbell	936,810
1998–99	(Australia) Jarrod Moseley	330,798
1997–98	(Scotland) Andrew Coltart	316,107
1996–97	(Australia) Peter Lonard	484,534
1995	(Australia) Craig Parry	334,804
1994	(Australia) Robert Allenby (2)	199,645
1993	(Australia) Peter Senior (3)	243,504
1992	(Australia) Robert Allenby	309,063
1991	(Australia) Rodger Davis (2)	343,277
1990	(Australia) Rodger Davis	375,026
1989	(Australia) Peter Senior (2)	443,196
1988	(Australia) Greg Norman (6)	303,922
1987	(Australia) Peter Senior	94,492
1986	(Australia) Greg Norman (5)	111,211
1985	(Australia) Ossie Moore	60,786
1984	(Australia) Greg Norman (4)	83,190
1983	(Australia) Greg Norman (3)	
1982	(Australia) Bob Shearer (4)	95,250
1981	(Australia) Bob Shearer (3)	56,982
1980	(Australia) Greg Norman (2)	57,701
1979	(Australia) Jack Newton	53,203
1978	(Australia) Greg Norman	
1977–78	(Australia) Bob Shearer (2)	
1976–77	(United States) Mark Lye	
1975–76	(Australia) Bill Dunk	
1974–75	(Australia) Bob Shearer	17,257
1973–74	(Australia) Stewart Ginn	

=== Multiple winners ===
Rank	Player	Wins	Years won
1	(Australia) Greg Norman	6	1978, 1980, 1983, 1984, 1986, 1988
T2	(Australia) Bob Shearer	4	1974–75, 1977–78, 1981, 1982
T2	(Australia) Peter Senior	4	1987, 1989, 1993, 2012
4	(Australia) Craig Parry	3	1995, 2002, 2007
T5	(Australia) Robert Allenby	2	1992, 1994
T5	(Australia) Greg Chalmers	2	2011, 2014
T5	(Australia) Rodger Davis	2	1990, 1991
T5	(Australia) Peter Lonard	2	1996–97, 2003
T5	(Australia) Adam Scott	2	2005, 2013

== Awards ==
Season	Player of the Year	Rookie of the Year
2025–26		(Australia) Declan O'Donovan
2024–25	(Australia) Elvis Smylie	(Australia) Ryan Peake
2023–24	(New Zealand) Kazuma Kobori	(New Zealand) Kazuma Kobori
2022–23	(Australia) David Micheluzzi	(Australia) Haydn Barron
2021–22	(Australia) Dimitrios Papadatos (2)	No award
2020–21	(Australia) Brad Kennedy	No award
2019	(New Zealand) Ryan Fox	No award
2018	(Australia) Matthew Millar (2)	No award
2017	(Australia) Dimitrios Papadatos	No award
2016	(Australia) Adam Blyth	No award
2015	(Australia) Matthew Millar	No award
2002–2014: No awards
2000–01	(Australia) Aaron Baddeley	(Australia) Aaron Baddeley
1999–2000	(New Zealand) Michael Campbell	(Australia) Brett Rumford
1998–99	(Australia) Jarrod Moseley	(Australia) Geoff Ogilvy
1996–1997: Unknown
1995	Unknown	(Australia) Greg Chalmers
1994	Unknown	(United States) Jack O'Keefe
1993	(Australia) Peter Senior	(New Zealand) Michael Campbell
1992	(Australia) Robert Allenby	(Australia) Robert Allenby
1991	Unknown	
1990	Unknown	(Sweden) Gabriel Hjertstedt
1989	Unknown	(United States) Louis Brown
1988	Unknown	(Australia) Bradley Hughes

== Von Nida Tour ==
Between 2003 and 2008, the PGA Tour of Australasia ran a second-tier tour known as the Von Nida Tour (named after Australian golfer Norman Von Nida) which featured around ten events with purses in the region of A$100,000 each. The main tour events took place in the Southern Hemisphere summer, that is late one calendar year and early the next, while the Von Nida Tour events mainly took place in the local spring and autumn. However the money list was calculated for calendar years. From 2009, the Von Nida Tour merged into the PGA Tour of Australasia Tour.

=== Von Nida Tour Order of Merit winners ===
Season	Winner	Prize money (A$)
2008	(New Zealand) Michael Long	27,651
2007	(Australia) Andrew Bonhomme	41,497
2006	(Australia) Marc Leishman	54,679
2005	(Australia) Adam Bland	40,180
2004	(Australia) Kim Felton	46,500
2003	(Australia) Scott Hend	52,007

=== Earlier second-tier tours ===
Between 2000 and 2001, the PGA Tour of Australasia ran a second-tier tour known as the Development Tour.
