= 2000–01 PGA Tour of Australasia =

Golf tour season

2000–01 PGA Tour of Australasia season
- Duration: 16 November 2000 – 25 February 2001
- Number of official events: 11
- Most wins: (Australia) Aaron Baddeley (2) (New Zealand) David Smail (2)
- Order of Merit: (Australia) Aaron Baddeley
- Player of the Year: (Australia) Aaron Baddeley
- Rookie of the Year: (Australia) Aaron Baddeley

The 2000–01 PGA Tour of Australasia was the 29th season on the PGA Tour of Australasia, the main professional golf tour in Australia and New Zealand since it was formed in 1973.

== Schedule ==
The following table lists official events during the 2000–01 season.

Date	Tournament	Location	Purse (A$)	Winner (Note: The number in brackets after each winner's name is the number of PGA Tour of Australasia events they had won up to and including that tournament. This information is only shown for PGA Tour of Australasia members.)	OWGR points	Other tours (Note: ASA − Asian PGA Tour; EUR − European Tour.)	Notes
19 Nov	Johnnie Walker Classic	Thailand	£800,000	(United States) Tiger Woods (n/a)	24	ASA, EUR	
26 Nov	Holden Australian Open	Victoria	1,250,000	(Australia) Aaron Baddeley (2)	32		Flagship event
3 Dec	Australian PGA Championship	Queensland	1,000,000	(Australia) Robert Allenby (6)	16		
10 Dec	Ford South Australian Open	South Australia	600,000	(Australia) Peter Lonard (2)	16		
14 Jan	ANZ Victorian Open Championship	Victoria	250,000	(Australia) Scott Laycock (1)	16		
21 Jan	New Zealand Open	New Zealand	NZ$500,000	(New Zealand) David Smail (1)	16		
28 Jan	Canon Challenge	New South Wales	550,000	(New Zealand) David Smail (2)	16		
4 Feb	Heineken Classic	Western Australia	1,750,000	(New Zealand) Michael Campbell (7)	20	EUR	
18 Feb	Greg Norman Holden International	New South Wales	2,000,000	(Australia) Aaron Baddeley (3)	22	EUR	
18 Feb	Ericsson Masters	Victoria	1,000,000	(Scotland) Colin Montgomerie (n/a)	20		
25 Feb	ANZ Tour Championship	New South Wales	1,500,000	(Australia) Peter Lonard (3)	16		Tour Championship

== Order of Merit ==
The Order of Merit was based on prize money won during the season, calculated in Australian dollars.

Position	Player	Prize money (A$)
1	(Australia) Aaron Baddeley	662,126
2	(Australia) Peter Lonard	579,388
3	(New Zealand) Michael Campbell	484,732
4	(New Zealand) David Smail	428,889
5	(Australia) Nick O'Hern	385,730

== Awards ==
Award	Winner	Ref.
Player of the Year	(Australia) Aaron Baddeley	
Rookie of the Year (Norman Von Nida Shield)	(Australia) Aaron Baddeley	

== Australasian Development Tour ==
2001 Australasian Development Tour season
- Duration: 22 March 2001 – 21 October 2001
- Number of official events: 10
- Order of Merit: (Australia) Chris Gray

The 2001 Australasian Development Tour was the second and final season of the Australasian Development Tour, the official development tour of the PGA Tour of Australasia between 2000 and 2001.

=== Schedule ===
The following table lists official events during the 2001 season.

Date	Tournament	Location	Purse (A$)	Winner (Note: The number in brackets after each winner's name is the number of Australasian Development Tour events they had won up to and including that tournament. It is rare for someone to accumulate many wins on the Australasian Development Tour as success at this level usually leads to promotion to the PGA Tour of Australasia.)	Ref.
25 Mar	Queensland PGA Championship	Queensland	100,000	(Australia) Anthony Painter (1)	
1 Apr	Scenic Circle Hotels Dunedin Classic	New Zealand	100,000	(Australia) David Podlich (1)	
8 Apr	Christchurch City Golf Classic	New Zealand	100,000	(New Zealand) Alastair Sidford (1)	
28 Apr	Schweppes SA PGA Championship	South Australia	100,000	(Australia) Tony Carolan (1)	
20 May	WA PGA Championship	Western Australia	100,000	(Australia) Marcus Cain (1)	
27 May	Western Australian Open	Western Australia	100,000	(Australia) Kim Felton (1)	
12 Aug	New Caledonia Open	New Caledonia	100,000	(New Zealand) Les Miller (1)	
19 Aug	Tahiti Open	Tahiti	100,000	(Australia) Chris Gray (2)	
14 Oct	Crown Victorian PGA Championship	Victoria	100,000	(Australia) Nathan Gatehouse (1)	
21 Oct	Toyota Southern Classic	New South Wales	100,000	(New Zealand) Steven Alker (1)	

=== Order of Merit ===
The Order of Merit was based on prize money won during the season, calculated in Australian dollars. The top 20 players on the tour earned status to play on the 2002 PGA Tour of Australasia.

Position	Player	Prize money (A$)
1	(Australia) Chris Gray	36,225
2	(Australia) Gavin Coles	30,756
3	(New Zealand) Les Miller	27,145
4	(Australia) Tony Carolan	26,450
5	(Australia) David Podlich	24,674
