= ANZ Championship (golf) =

Tournament information
- Location: Port Stevens, Australia
- Established: 1998
- Course: Horizons Golf Resort
- Par: 72
- Length: 6,764 yards (6,185 m)
- Tours: PGA Tour of Australasia; European Tour
- Format: Modified stableford Stroke play
- Prize fund: A$1,700,000
- Month played: February
- Final year: 2004

Tournament record score
- Aggregate: 269 Peter Lonard (2001)
- To par: −15 Andre Stolz (2000) −15 Peter Lonard (2001)
- Score: 46 points Richard S. Johnson (2002)

Final champion
- (England) Brian Davis
- Location in Australia Location in New South Wales

The ANZ Championship was a men's professional golf tournament, co-sanctioned by the European Tour and the PGA Tour of Australasia, that was played in Australia between 2002 and 2004. The event had been played as a 72-hole stroke-play tournament on the Australasian tour from 1998 to 2001 as the ANZ Tour Championship.

Uniquely for both tours, it was played using a modified stableford scoring system, similar to the former PGA Tour event The International. This departure from the usual stroke play format, designed to encourage more attacking play, was not received with universal approval as the perception was that it would penalise the steadier players.

In the final event in 2004, Laura Davies became the first female golfer to compete on either the Australasian or European Tour, but failed to make an impact, missing the cut and finishing in next to last place on −13 points.

== Venues ==
The event has been played at the following venues:

- 1998–2000: Royal Canberra Golf Club
- 2001: Concord Golf Club
- 2002: The Lakes Golf Club
- 2003: New South Wales Golf Club
- 2004: Horizons Golf Resort

== Winners ==
PGA Tour of Australasia (Tour Championship)	1998–2001
PGA Tour of Australasia (Regular)	2002–2004

#	Year	Tour(s) (Note: ANZ − PGA Tour of Australasia; EUR − European Tour.)	Winner	Score	To par	Margin of victory	Runner(s)-up	Ref.
ANZ Championship
7th	2004	ANZ, EUR	(England) Brian Davis	44 points		1 point	(England) Paul Casey	
6th	2003	ANZ, EUR	(England) Paul Casey	45 points		4 points	(Australia) Stuart Appleby (Australia) Nick O'Hern	
5th	2002	ANZ, EUR	(Sweden) Richard S. Johnson	46 points		2 points	(Australia) Scott Laycock (Australia) Craig Parry	
ANZ Tour Championship
4th	2001	ANZ	(Australia) Peter Lonard	269	−15	1 stroke	(Australia) Nathan Green	
3rd	2000	ANZ	(Australia) Andre Stolz	273	−15	3 strokes	(Australia) Brett Rumford	
2nd	1999	ANZ	(Australia) Marcus Cain	276	−12	4 strokes	(Australia) Paul Gow	
1st	1998	ANZ	(Australia) Mathew Goggin	278	−10	Playoff (Note: Goggin won with birdie on first extra hole)	(Australia) Brad King	
