= Canon Challenge =

Golf tournament held in Australia

Tournament information
- Location: Norwest, New South Wales, Australia
- Established: 1993
- Course: Castle Hill Golf Club
- Par: 72
- Length: 6,767 yards (6,188 m)
- Tour: PGA Tour of Australasia
- Format: Stroke play
- Prize fund: A$550,000
- Month played: January
- Final year: 2001

Tournament record score
- Aggregate: 269 David Smail (2001)
- To par: −19 as above

Final champion
- (New Zealand) David Smail
- Location in Australia Location in New South Wales

The Canon Challenge was a golf tournament held in Australia between 1993 and 2001. Prize money was A$250,000 in 1993, A$300,000 in 1994 and $350,000 in 1995.

In 2001 Paul Gow set an Australasian tour record with a first-round score of 60.

== Winners ==
Year	Winner	Score	To par	Margin of victory	Runner(s)-up	Winner's share (A$)	Venue	Ref.
2001	(New Zealand) David Smail	269	−19	1 stroke	(United States) David Gossett	99,000	Castle Hill	
2000	(Australia) Paul Gow	272	−16	1 stroke	(Australia) Kenny Druce	99,000	Castle Hill	
1999	(Australia) Rod Pampling	270	−18	3 strokes	(Australia) Geoff Ogilvy	63,000	Terrey Hills	
1998	(Australia) Peter O'Malley	271	−17	9 strokes	(Australia) Paul Gow	90,000	Terrey Hills	
1997	(Australia) Peter Senior (3)	274	−14	Playoff	(New Zealand) Steven Alker	81,000	Terrey Hills	
1996	(Australia) Peter Senior (2)	278	−10	2 strokes	(Australia) Robert Allenby (Australia) Brad King (Australia) Robert Willis	54,000	Terrey Hills	
1995	(Australia) Craig Parry	275	−13	3 strokes	(Australia) Wayne Smith	63,000	Terrey Hills	
1994	(Australia) Peter Senior	276	−12	Playoff	(Australia) Chris Gray	54,000	Castle Hill	
1993	(New Zealand) Michael Campbell	272	−16	3 strokes	(Australia) Steven Conran	45,000	Castle Hill	
