= Australian Masters =

Golf tournament

Coordinates: 37.92°S 145.10°E

Tournament information
- Location: Melbourne, Australia
- Established: 1979
- Course: Huntingdale Golf Club
- Par: 71
- Length: 7,682 yards (7,024 m)
- Organized by: IMG
- Tours: PGA Tour of Australasia; European Tour
- Format: Stroke play
- Prize fund: A$750,000
- Month played: November
- Final year: 2015

Tournament record score
- Aggregate: 268 Bradley Hughes (1998)
- To par: −24 as above

Final champion
- (Australia) Peter Senior

Location map
- Location in Australia Location in Victoria

The Australian Masters was an annual golf tournament on the PGA Tour of Australasia held in Victoria, Australia from 1979 to 2015.

== History ==
The tournament is the brainchild of schoolteacher David Inglis. The Australian Masters was intended to be, in the words of Inglis, "an unashamed copy" of the Masters Tournament, the famous tournament in the United States. The event would be played at the same course every year and a ceremonial jacket would placed on the champion. In this case, the course would be Huntingdale Golf Club.

Inglis had no experience running a golf tournament and recruited Ian Stanley, a leading Australian touring professional, to give him advice. Stanley was able to secure commitments from top golfers like Graham Marsh, Lee Trevino, Bob Shearer, and Greg Norman. Prize money was originally supposed to be $50,000 but, due to an inability to find enough sponsors, a decision was made to reduce the purse to $30,000. Multiple players threatened to withdraw and a decision was made to cancel the tournament. However, at the last minute David Haines, a member at Huntingdale, was able to secure an additional $10,000 and the tournament could go on. New Zealand golfer Barry Vivian won the event by one over Shearer. The tournament lost $50,000 but managed to be profitable thereafter.

In 1989 the International Management Group took control of the management of the tournament.

Though the Australian Masters usually was part of the PGA Tour of Australasia's calendar, the event was not on the Order of Merit in 1992. The PGA Tour of Australasia requested that the field expand from 100 players to a full-field of 120 players. International Management Group (IMG), which ran the event, rejected the request. Frank Williams, an employee of IMG, justified the decision by stating, "The sponsors expect the Masters to be different from other Australian tournaments and it was sold to them as a limited-field special event."

The tournament was co-sanctioned by the European Tour from 2006 to 2009, with a significant 20% increase in the prize fund. Because the tournament is played late in the calendar year, in November or December, it formed part of the following year's European Tour schedule from 2006 through 2008. With the European Tour's decision to realign its schedule with the calendar year for 2010, the 2009 event was the first to be part of the current calendar year's tour schedule. The co-sanctioning with the European Tour was dropped after the 2009 event.

On 18 March 2009 the Victorian State Government announced a major coup, confirming that then World Number 1 Tiger Woods would play in the 2009 event at its new venue, Kingston Heath. The announcement caused a minor public backlash due to 50% of Woods' A$3 million appearance fee being paid by taxpayer funds. Woods' appearance was tipped to generate close to A$20 million for the Victorian economy via tourism and other related areas.

The event is owned by IMG. The event was not played in 2016 and its future is reported to be in doubt.

The tournament's iconic broadcast theme music used during the 1980s and 1990s was "Send Them Victorious" by Graham De Wilde, with tournament's tagline "The Tradition Continues" in use for the duration of its existence. Greg Norman won the Masters a record six times. The final event featured 56-year-old Peter Senior as the champion. It was his third win in this event and became the first player to win the Australian Open, the Australian PGA Championship and the Australian Masters all in his fifties. Future major winner who was an amateur at the time Bryson DeChambeau finished tied in second place.

== Venues ==
Until 2008, the Australian Masters was always held at the Huntingdale Golf Club in South Oakleigh. From 2009, a rotation system was introduced and the event was staged at different courses in the Melbourne area.

The following venues have been used since the founding of the Australian Masters in 1979.

Venue	Location	First	Last	Times
Huntingdale Golf Club	Victoria	1979	2015	31
Kingston Heath Golf Club	Victoria	2009	2012	2
Victoria Golf Club	Victoria	2010	2011	2
Royal Melbourne Golf Club	Victoria	2013	2013	1
Metropolitan Golf Club	Victoria	2014	2014	1

== Winners ==
Year	Tour(s) (Note: ANZ − PGA Tour of Australasia; EUR − European Tour.)	Winner	Score	To par	Margin of victory	Runner(s)-up	Venue	Ref.
Uniqlo Masters
2015	ANZ	(Australia) Peter Senior (3)	276	−8	2 strokes	(United States) Bryson DeChambeau (a) (Australia) Andrew Evans (Australia) John Senden	Huntingdale	
BetEasy Masters
2014	ANZ	(Australia) Nick Cullen	279	−9	1 stroke	(Australia) James Nitties (Australia) Adam Scott (Australia) Josh Younger	Metropolitan	
Talisker Masters
2013	ANZ	(Australia) Adam Scott (2)	270	−14	2 strokes	(United States) Matt Kuchar	Royal Melbourne	
2012	ANZ	(Australia) Adam Scott	271	−17	4 strokes	(England) Ian Poulter	Kingston Heath	
JBWere Masters
2011	ANZ	(England) Ian Poulter	269	−15	3 strokes	(Australia) Marcus Fraser	Victoria	
2010	ANZ	(Australia) Stuart Appleby	274	−10	1 stroke	(Australia) Adam Bland	Victoria	
2009	ANZ, EUR	(United States) Tiger Woods	274	−14	2 strokes	(Australia) Greg Chalmers	Kingston Heath	
Sportsbet Australian Masters
2008	ANZ, EUR	(Australia) Rod Pampling	276	−12	Playoff	(Australia) Marcus Fraser	Huntingdale	
Mastercard Masters
2007	ANZ, EUR	(Australia) Aaron Baddeley	275	−13	Playoff	(Sweden) Daniel Chopra	Huntingdale	
2006	ANZ, EUR	(England) Justin Rose	276	−12	2 strokes	(Australia) Greg Chalmers (Australia) Richard Green	Huntingdale	
2005	ANZ	(Australia) Robert Allenby (2)	271	−17	Playoff	(United States) Bubba Watson	Huntingdale	
2004	ANZ	(Australia) Richard Green	271	−17	Playoff	(Australia) Greg Chalmers (Australia) David McKenzie	Huntingdale	
2003	ANZ	(Australia) Robert Allenby	277	−11	Playoff	(Australia) Jarrod Moseley (Australia) Craig Parry (Australia) Adam Scott	Huntingdale	
2002	ANZ	(Australia) Peter Lonard (2)	279	−9	Playoff	(Australia) Gavin Coles (Australia) Adam Scott	Huntingdale	
Ericsson Masters
2001	ANZ	(Scotland) Colin Montgomerie	278	−10	1 stroke	(Australia) Nathan Green	Huntingdale	
2000	ANZ	(New Zealand) Michael Campbell	282	−10	4 strokes	(Australia) Brett Rumford	Huntingdale	
1999	ANZ	(Australia) Craig Spence	276	−16	1 stroke	(Australia) Greg Norman	Huntingdale	
1998	ANZ	(Australia) Bradley Hughes (2)	268	−24	5 strokes	(Australia) Mathew Goggin	Huntingdale	
1997	ANZ	(Australia) Peter Lonard	276	−16	Playoff	(Australia) Peter O'Malley	Huntingdale	
1996	ANZ	(Australia) Craig Parry (3)	279	−13	2 strokes	(Australia) Bradley Hughes	Huntingdale	
Australian Masters
1995	ANZ	(Australia) Peter Senior (2)	280	−12	1 stroke	(Australia) Wayne Grady (Australia) Lucas Parsons (United States) Tom Watson	Huntingdale	
Microsoft Australian Masters
1994	ANZ	(Australia) Craig Parry (2)	282	−10	3 strokes	(South Africa) Ernie Els	Huntingdale	
1993	ANZ	(Australia) Bradley Hughes	281	−11	Playoff	(Australia) Peter Senior	Huntingdale	
Pyramid Australian Masters
1992		(Australia) Craig Parry	283	−9	3 strokes	(Australia) Greg Norman	Huntingdale	
1991	ANZ	(Australia) Peter Senior	278	−14	1 stroke	(Australia) Greg Norman	Huntingdale	
Australian Masters
1990	ANZ	(Australia) Greg Norman (6)	273	−19	2 strokes	(Australia) Mike Clayton (England) Nick Faldo (United States) John Morse	Huntingdale	
1989	ANZ	(Australia) Greg Norman (5)	280	−12	5 strokes	(England) Russell Claydon (a)	Huntingdale	
1988	ANZ	(Australia) Ian Baker-Finch	283	−9	Playoff	(Australia) Roger Mackay (Australia) Craig Parry	Huntingdale	
1987	ANZ	(Australia) Greg Norman (4)	273	−19	9 strokes	(Australia) Peter Senior	Huntingdale	
1986	ANZ	(United States) Mark O'Meara	284	−8	1 stroke	(Australia) David Graham	Huntingdale	
1985	ANZ	(West Germany) Bernhard Langer	281	−11	3 strokes	(England) Nick Faldo (Australia) Greg Norman	Huntingdale	
1984	ANZ	(Australia) Greg Norman (3)	285	−7	3 strokes	(Australia) David Graham (West Germany) Bernhard Langer	Huntingdale	
1983	ANZ	(Australia) Greg Norman (2)	285	−7	4 strokes	(West Germany) Bernhard Langer	Huntingdale	
1982	ANZ	(Australia) Graham Marsh	289	−3	1 stroke	(Australia) Stewart Ginn	Huntingdale	
1981	ANZ	(Australia) Greg Norman	289	−3	7 strokes	(Australia) Terry Gale (Japan) Norio Suzuki	Huntingdale	
1980	ANZ	(United States) Gene Littler	288	−4	Playoff	(Australia) Rodger Davis	Huntingdale	
1979	ANZ	(New Zealand) Barry Vivian	289	−3	1 stroke	(Australia) Bob Shearer	Huntingdale	
