= 1997–98 PGA Tour of Australasia =

Golf tour season

1997–98 PGA Tour of Australasia season
- Duration: 11 September 1997 – 8 March 1998
- Number of official events: 13
- Order of Merit: (Scotland) Andrew Coltart

The 1997–98 PGA Tour of Australasia was the 26th season on the PGA Tour of Australasia, the main professional golf tour in Australia and New Zealand since it was formed in 1973.

== Schedule ==
The following table lists official events during the 1997–98 season.

| Date | Tournament | Location | Purse (A$) | Winner (Note: The number in brackets after each winner's name is the number of PGA Tour of Australasia events they had won up to and including that tournament. This information is only shown for PGA Tour of Australasia members.) | OWGR points | Other tours (Note: ASA − Asian PGA Tour; EUR − European Tour.) | Notes |
|---|---|---|---|---|---|---|---|
| 14 Sep | Ericsson Asia-Pacific Masters | Indonesia | US$500,000 | (Australia) Darren Cole (1) | 16 | ASA | New tournament |
| 23 Nov | MasterCard Australian PGA Championship | New South Wales | 500,000 | (Scotland) Andrew Coltart (2) | 16 | | |
| 30 Nov | Holden Australian Open | Victoria | 1,000,000 | (England) Lee Westwood (n/a) | 38 | | Flagship event |
| 7 Dec | Australasian Players Championship | Queensland | 500,000 | (Australia) Greg Chalmers (1) | 26 | | |
| 14 Dec | AMP Air New Zealand Open | New Zealand | NZ$500,000 | (New Zealand) Greg Turner (5) | 18 | | |
| 21 Dec | Schweppes Coolum Classic | Queensland | 200,000 | (Australia) Craig Parry (8) | 18 | | |
| 11 Jan | Victorian Open | Victoria | 200,000 | (Australia) Brad King (1) | 16 | | |
| 25 Jan | Johnnie Walker Classic | Thailand | £750,000 | (United States) Tiger Woods (n/a) | 40 | EUR | |
| 1 Feb | Heineken Classic | Western Australia | 1,200,000 | (Denmark) Thomas Bjørn (n/a) | 32 | EUR | |
| 8 Feb | Greg Norman Holden International | New South Wales | 1,000,000 | (Australia) Greg Norman (33) | 36 | | |
| 15 Feb | Ericsson Masters | Victoria | 750,000 | (Australia) Bradley Hughes (4) | 30 | | |
| 21 Feb | Canon Challenge | New South Wales | 500,000 | (Australia) Peter O'Malley (2) | 16 | | |
| 8 Mar | ANZ Tour Championship | Australian Capital Territory | 500,000 | (Australia) Mathew Goggin (1) | 16 | | New tournament Tour Championship |

== Order of Merit ==
The Order of Merit was based on prize money won during the season, calculated in Australian dollars.

| Position | Player | Prize money (A$) |
|---|---|---|
| 1 | (Scotland) Andrew Coltart | 316,107 |
| 2 | (Australia) Peter O'Malley | 264,534 |
| 3 | (Australia) Greg Chalmers | 263,926 |
| 4 | (Australia) Mathew Goggin | 220,417 |
| 5 | (Australia) Robert Allenby | 213,234 |
