= 1998–99 PGA Tour of Australasia =

Golf tour season

1998–99 PGA Tour of Australasia season
- Duration: 22 October 1998 – 6 March 1999
- Number of official events: 12
- Order of Merit: (Australia) Jarrod Moseley
- Player of the Year: (Australia) Jarrod Moseley
- Rookie of the Year: (Australia) Geoff Ogilvy

The 1998–99 PGA Tour of Australasia was the 27th season on the PGA Tour of Australasia, the main professional golf tour in Australia and New Zealand since it was formed in 1973.

== Schedule ==
The following table lists official events during the 1998–99 season.

| Date | Tournament | Location | Purse (A$) | Winner (Note: The number in brackets after each winner's name is the number of PGA Tour of Australasia events they had won up to and including that tournament. This information is only shown for PGA Tour of Australasia members.) | OWGR points | Other tours (Note: EUR − European Tour.) | Notes |
|---|---|---|---|---|---|---|---|
| 25 Oct | Ford South Australian Open | South Australia | 500,000 | (Australia) Stuart Bouvier (1) | 16 | | |
| 22 Nov | MasterCard Australian PGA Championship | New South Wales | 600,000 | (England) David Howell (n/a) | 16 | | |
| 29 Nov | ANZ Players Championship | Queensland | 500,000 | (Australia) Stephen Leaney (3) | 20 | | |
| 6 Dec | Holden Australian Open | South Australia | 640,000 | (Australia) Greg Chalmers (2) | 34 | | Flagship event |
| 13 Dec | New Zealand Open | New Zealand | NZ$300,000 | (New Zealand) Matthew Lane (1) | 16 | | |
| 20 Dec | Schweppes Coolum Classic | Queensland | 200,000 | (Australia) Stuart Appleby (1) | 16 | | |
| 10 Jan | Victorian Open | Victoria | 200,000 | (Australia) Kenny Druce (1) | 16 | | |
| 31 Jan | Heineken Classic | Western Australia | 800,000 | (Australia) Jarrod Moseley (1) | 30 | EUR | |
| 7 Feb | Greg Norman Holden International | New South Wales | 1,000,000 | (New Zealand) Michael Long (2) | 22 | | |
| 14 Feb | Ericsson Masters | Victoria | 640,000 | (Australia) Craig Spence (1) | 16 | | |
| 21 Feb | Canon Challenge | New South Wales | 350,000 | (Australia) Rod Pampling (1) | 16 | | |
| 7 Mar | ANZ Tour Championship | Australian Capital Territory | 500,000 | (Australia) Marcus Cain (1) | 16 | | Tour Championship |

== Order of Merit ==
The Order of Merit was based on prize money won during the season, calculated in Australian dollars.

| Position | Player | Prize money (A$) |
|---|---|---|
| 1 | (Australia) Jarrod Moseley | 330,798 |
| 2 | (Australia) Rod Pampling | 287,907 |
| 3 | (Australia) Craig Spence | 277,160 |
| 4 | (Australia) Peter Lonard | 223,574 |
| 5 | (New Zealand) Michael Long | 221,780 |

== Awards ==
| Award | Winner | Ref. |
|---|---|---|
| Player of the Year | (Australia) Jarrod Moseley | |
| Rookie of the Year | (Australia) Geoff Ogilvy | |
