= Aaron Baddeley =

Australian professional golfer

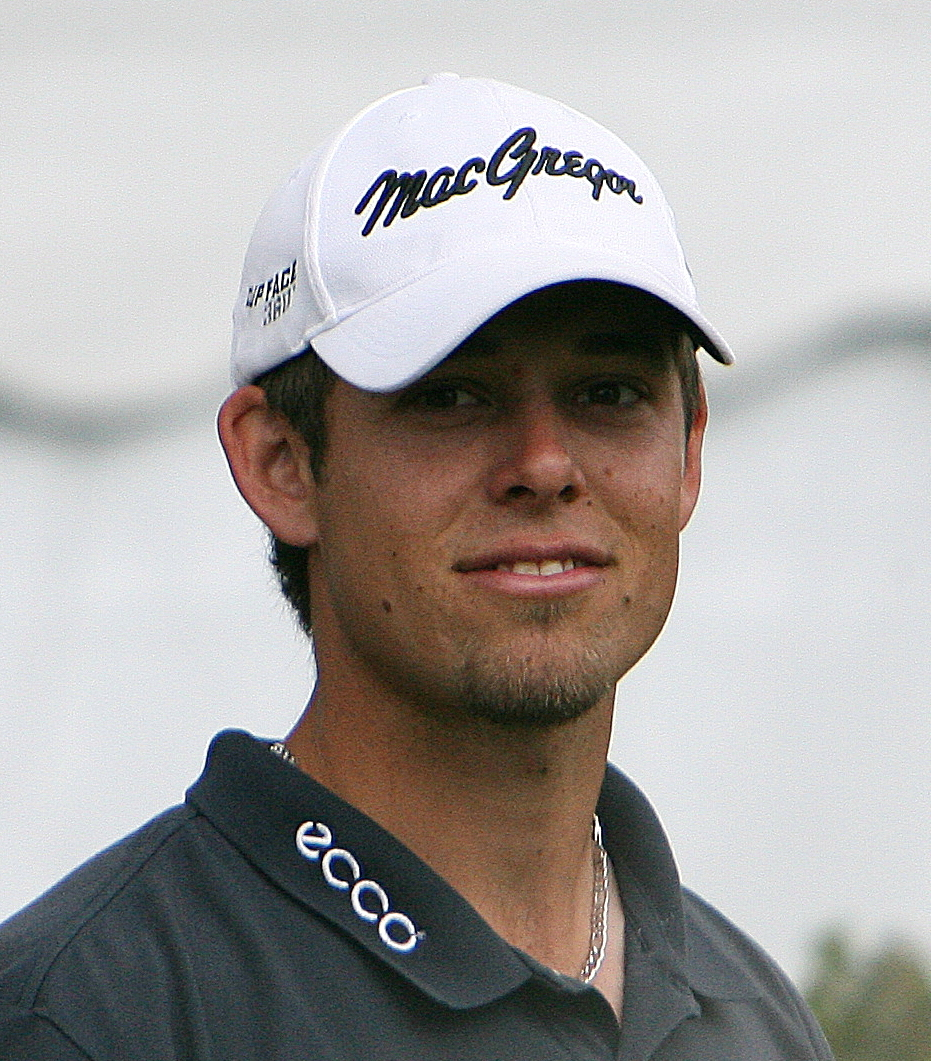
- Baddeley in 2007

Personal information
- Full name: Aaron John Baddeley
- Nickname: Badds
- Nationality: Australia
- Born: 17 March 1981 (age 45) Lebanon, New Hampshire, U.S.
- Height: 6 ft 0 in (1.83 m)
- Weight: 175 lb (79 kg; 12.5 st)
- Spouse: Richelle (m. 2005)
- Children: 6

Career
- Sport: Golf
- Turned professional: 2000
- Current tours: PGA Tour (past champion status); PGA Tour of Australasia
- Professional wins: 8
- Highest ranking: 16 (20 April 2008)

Number of wins by tour
- PGA Tour: 4
- European Tour: 2
- PGA Tour of Australasia: 4

Best results in major championships
- Masters Tournament: T17: 2009
- PGA Championship: T13: 2008
- U.S. Open: T13: 2007
- The Open Championship: T27: 2017

Achievements and awards
- PGA Tour of Australasia Order of Merit winner: 2000–01
- PGA Tour of Australasia Player of the Year: 2000–01
- PGA Tour of Australasia Rookie of the Year: 2000–01

Aaron John Baddeley (born 17 March 1981) is an Australian professional golfer.

== Early life ==
Baddeley was born in Lebanon, New Hampshire in the United States. However, his family moved to Australia when he was two years old. As a teen, Baddeley was perceived as one of the most promising golf talents in the world.

== Amateur career ==
Baddeley was the youngest player ever to represent Australia in the Eisenhower Trophy. He won the Holden Australian Open as an amateur in 1999.

== Professional career ==
In 2000, Baddeley turned pro. He successfully defended his Australian Open title in 2000. He was awarded the 2000 Australian Young Male Athlete of the Year. In 2001, he won the Greg Norman Holden International in Australia. He won the PGA Tour of Australasia's Order of Merit in 2000/01.

In 2002, Baddeley played on the second tier Nationwide Tour in the U.S. and placed tenth on the money list to earn a PGA Tour card for 2003. He had second-place finishes on the PGA Tour in 2003 at the Sony Open in Hawaii and 2004 at the Chrysler Classic of Tucson. However he struggled for consistency, and after a solid rookie season, when he finished 73rd on the money list, he only just retained his card in 2004, when he came 124th. In 2005 he moved back up the rankings to 78th and in 2006 he won his first PGA Tour title at the Verizon Heritage.

Baddeley won his second PGA Tour tournament in early 2007 and reached the top 50 of the world rankings. By September, he had entered the top 20. His career high ranking was 17th in 2008.

Baddeley was the leader after the third round of the U.S. Open at Oakmont Country Club on 16 June 2007 with a two over par score of 212 (72-70-70). He finished with an 80 and ended T-13.

After a lull in form over the following few seasons, where he was finishing only in the lower reaches of the top-125 on the money list, Baddeley returned to the winner's circle when he won the 2011 Northern Trust Open in California. He defended a one-shot third-round lead over Kevin Na and veteran Fred Couples, completing a steady closing round of 69 to beat another veteran, Vijay Singh, by two strokes.

In October 2011, Baddeley was selected by Greg Norman as one of his two wildcard picks for the 2011 Presidents Cup team. He was selected along with fellow Australian Robert Allenby to compete at Royal Melbourne in November.

Statistically speaking, Baddeley frequently ranks as one of the very best putters on the PGA Tour. As of 2010, he has qualified for the Tour's end-of-season statistical rankings 8 times; of those, he finished among the circuit's top 10 in putts per green in regulation five times, and among the top 15 seven times. The only qualified season in which Baddeley was not among the PGA Tour's top 15 putters by that metric came in 2004, when he finished 64th out of 196 players.

Baddeley started the 2015–16 season playing out of the Past Champions category after finishing 157th in the FedEx Cup and failing to regain a PGA Tour card through the Web.com Tour Finals. He earned his first win in five years at the 2016 Barbasol Championship, beating Kim Si-woo in a four-hole playoff.

== Personal life ==
Baddeley is a committed Christian and has confessed that it was his faith that prevented him from giving up professional golf on numerous occasions.

Baddeley's wife Richelle, whom he married on 15 April 2005, sums up Baddeley's faith in God, saying: "It never faltered. He never asked, 'What are you trying to teach me? I want you to be the man you want me to be. I will go through these [bad] times if that is Your will'."

Richelle has also been pivotal to Baddeley's resurgence. "I had to learn the balance of letting him be alone when he comes home sometimes upset. It's sheer frustration from him. He's played his best, and it just hasn't happened," she said.

Baddeley and his wife have six children: Jewell, Jolee, Jeremiah, Josiah, Jaddex and Jedidiah.

He has joint U.S. and Australian citizenship. He represents Australia in golf.

== Amateur wins ==
this list may be incomplete

- 1998 Victorian Amateur Championship, Victorian Junior Masters
- 1999 Riversdale Cup

== Professional wins (8) ==
=== PGA Tour wins (4) ===
No.	Date	Tournament	Winning score	Margin of victory	Runner-up
1	16 Apr 2006	Verizon Heritage	−15 (66-67-66-70=269)	1 stroke	(United States) Jim Furyk
2	4 Feb 2007	FBR Open	−21 (65-70-64-64=263)	1 stroke	(United States) John Rollins
3	20 Feb 2011	Northern Trust Open	−12 (67-69-67-69=272)	2 strokes	(Fiji) Vijay Singh
4	17 Jul 2016	Barbasol Championship	−18 (70-66-64-66=266)	Playoff	(South Korea) Kim Si-woo

PGA Tour playoff record (1–1)

No.	Year	Tournament	Opponent	Result
1	2003	Sony Open in Hawaii	(South Africa) Ernie Els	Lost to birdie on second extra hole
2	2016	Barbasol Championship	(South Korea) Kim Si-woo	Won with birdie on fourth extra hole

=== European Tour wins (2) ===
No.	Date	Tournament	Winning score	Margin of victory	Runner-up
1	11 Feb 2001	Greg Norman Holden International^{1}	−21 (67-68-68-68=271)	Playoff	(Spain) Sergio García
2	25 Nov 2007 (2008 season)	MasterCard Masters^{1}	−13 (70-66-69-70=275)	Playoff	(Sweden) Daniel Chopra

^{1}Co-sanctioned by the PGA Tour of Australasia

European Tour playoff record (2–0)

No.	Year	Tournament	Opponent	Result
1	2001	Greg Norman Holden International	(Spain) Sergio García	Won with birdie on first extra hole
2	2007	MasterCard Masters	(Sweden) Daniel Chopra	Won with par on fourth extra hole

=== PGA Tour of Australasia wins (4) ===
Legend
Flagship events (2)
Other PGA Tour of Australasia (2)

No.	Date	Tournament	Winning score	Margin of victory	Runner(s)-up
1	28 Nov 1999	Holden Australian Open (as an amateur)	−14 (67-68-70-69=274)	2 strokes	(Australia) Greg Norman, (Australia) Nick O'Hern
2	26 Nov 2000	Holden Australian Open (2)	−10 (69-69-68-72=278)	2 strokes	(Australia) Robert Allenby
3	11 Feb 2001	Greg Norman Holden International^{1}	−21 (67-68-68-68=271)	Playoff	(Spain) Sergio García
4	25 Nov 2007	MasterCard Masters^{1}	−13 (70-66-69-70=275)	Playoff	(Sweden) Daniel Chopra

^{1}Co-sanctioned by the European Tour

PGA Tour of Australasia playoff record (2–0)

No.	Year	Tournament	Opponent	Result
1	2001	Greg Norman Holden International	(Spain) Sergio García	Won with birdie on first extra hole
2	2007	MasterCard Masters	(Sweden) Daniel Chopra	Won with par on fourth extra hole

== Results in major championships ==
Tournament	2000	2001	2002	2003	2004	2005	2006	2007	2008	2009
Masters Tournament	CUT	CUT						T52	CUT	T17
U.S. Open	CUT				CUT			T13	T29	
The Open Championship		CUT			CUT		CUT	CUT	CUT	
PGA Championship				T57			T55	CUT	T13	CUT

Tournament	2010	2011	2012	2013	2014	2015	2016	2017	2018
Masters Tournament		T47	T40						
U.S. Open	CUT	CUT	CUT	CUT	T23				T25
The Open Championship		CUT	T69					T27	
PGA Championship		CUT	T42				T49		

Tournament	2019
Masters Tournament	
PGA Championship	
U.S. Open	CUT
The Open Championship	

Did not play

CUT = missed the half-way cut
"T" = tied for place

=== Summary ===
Tournament	Wins	2nd	3rd	Top-5	Top-10	Top-25	Events	Cuts made
Masters Tournament	0	0	0	0	0	1	7	4
PGA Championship	0	0	0	0	0	1	8	5
U.S. Open	0	0	0	0	0	3	11	4
The Open Championship	0	0	0	0	0	0	8	2
Totals	0	0	0	0	0	5	34	15

- Most consecutive cuts made – 4 (2014 U.S. Open – 2018 U.S. Open)
- Longest streak of top-10s – 0

== Results in The Players Championship ==
Tournament	2004	2005	2006	2007	2008	2009
The Players Championship	CUT	78	CUT	T37	T32	T9

Tournament	2010	2011	2012	2013	2014	2015	2016	2017	2018	2019
The Players Championship	CUT	T6	CUT	CUT	CUT	CUT	CUT	T41		CUT

Tournament	2020	2021	2022	2023	2024
The Players Championship	C			72	CUT

Top 10
Did not play

CUT = missed the halfway cut
"T" indicates a tie for a place
C = Canceled after the first round due to the COVID-19 pandemic

== Results in World Golf Championships ==
Tournament	2006	2007	2008	2009	2010	2011	2012
Match Play		R16	R16	R64			R64
Championship		T6	T15	DQ		T28	12
Invitational	T54	T20	T43			T11	T8
Champions						T23	

Top 10
Did not play

DQ = Disqualified
QF, R16, R32, R64 = Round in which player lost in match play
"T" = Tied
Note that the HSBC Champions did not become a WGC event until 2009.

== PGA Tour career summary ==
Season	Wins	Earnings ($)	Rank
2001	0	19,435	–
2002	0	16,380	–
2003	0	989,168	73
2004	0	632,876	123
2005	0	1,006,006	78
2006	1	1,516,513	55
2007	1	3,441,119	10
2008	0	1,665,587	49
2009	0	837,065	101
2010	0	879,317	110
2011	1	3,094,693	20
2012	0	1,215,753	76
2013	0	721,024	113
2014	0	942,559	102
2015	0	439,925	165
2016	1	1,644,915	61
2017	0	755,356	132
2018	0	725,928	134
2019	0	904,982	124
2020	0	286,504	166
2021	0	160,640	202
2022	0	199,830	196
2023	0	1,337,851	96
2024	0	471,410	154
Career*	4	23,921,625	70

* Through the 2024 season.
Note: Baddeley did not join the PGA Tour until 2003 so he was not ranked on the money list until then.

== Team appearances ==
Amateur

- Eisenhower Trophy (representing Australia): 1998, 2000
- Australian Men's Interstate Teams Matches (representing Victoria): 1998, 1999

Professional

- World Cup (representing Australia): 2001
- Presidents Cup (International Team): 2011

== See also ==
- 2002 Buy.com Tour graduates
