= Kim Felton =

Australian professional golfer (born 1975)

Personal information
- Nationality: Australia
- Born: 27 March 1975 (age 51) Perth, Western Australia, Australia
- Height: 1.88 m (6 ft 2 in)
- Weight: 76 kg (168 lb; 12.0 st)

Career
- Sport: Golf
- Turned professional: 1999
- Current tour: PGA Tour of Australasia
- Former tours: Nationwide Tour; OneAsia Tour; Von Nida Tour; Gateway Tour
- Professional wins: 15

Number of wins by tour
- PGA Tour of Australasia: 1
- Korn Ferry Tour: 1
- Other: 13

Best results in major championships
- Masters Tournament: DNP
- PGA Championship: DNP
- U.S. Open: DNP
- The Open Championship: T36: 2004

Achievements and awards
- Von Nida Tour Order of Merit winner: 2004

Kim Felton (born 27 March 1975) is an Australian professional golfer.

== Early life and amateur career ==
In 1975, Felton was born. As an amateur, Felton won the Australian Amateur in 1997 and was the low individual in the 1998 Eisenhower Trophy.

== Professional career ==
In 1999, Felton turned professional. He has played mainly on the PGA Tour of Australasia and its developmental Tour, the Von Nida Tour. He won five events on the Von Nida Tour as well as three other Australian events. Felton also played on the Nationwide Tour from 2005 to 2008 where he won the 2005 Knoxville Open. In 2010, he won the Midea China Classic on the OneAsia Tour.

== Amateur wins ==
- 1997 Australian Amateur

== Professional wins (15) ==
=== PGA Tour of Australasia wins (1) ===
No.	Date	Tournament	Winning score	Margin of victory	Runner-up
1	26 May 2002	Western Australia PGA Championship	−7 (70-68-66-69=273)	Playoff	(Australia) Euan Walters

PGA Tour of Australasia playoff record (1–0)

No.	Year	Tournament	Opponent	Result
1	2002	Western Australia PGA Championship	(Australia) Euan Walters	Won with par on first extra hole

=== Nationwide Tour wins (1) ===
No.	Date	Tournament	Winning score	Margin of victory	Runner-up
1	19 Jun 2005	Knoxville Open	−11 (71-70-67-69=277)	1 stroke	(United States) David Peoples

=== OneAsia Tour wins (1) ===
No.	Date	Tournament	Winning score	Margin of victory	Runner-up
1	17 Oct 2010	Midea China Classic	−12 (70-71-66-65=272)	2 strokes	(Scotland) Simon Yates

=== Von Nida Tour wins (5) ===
No.	Date	Tournament	Winning score	Margin of victory	Runner(s)-up
1	25 May 2003	WA PGA Championship	−24 (68-67-64-65=264)	8 strokes	(Australia) Adrian Percey
2	30 May 2004	WA PGA Championship (2)	−14 (67-65-65-69=266)	3 strokes	(Australia) Benjamin Burge
3	27 Jun 2004	Queensland Masters	−14 (69-71-68-66=274)	Playoff	(Sweden) Jens Nilsson
4	4 Jul 2004	Cairns Classic	−23 (67-66-62-70=265)	8 strokes	(Australia) Chris Campbell, (Australia) Peter Senior
5	4 Feb 2007	Victorian Open	−8 (71-68-68-73=280)	1 stroke	(Australia) Steve Collins, (Australia) Marc Leishman, (Australia) Aron Price

=== Australasian Development Tour wins (1) ===
No.	Date	Tournament	Winning score	Margin of victory	Runner-up
1	27 May 2001	Western Australian Open	−17 (64-67-63-69=263)	Playoff	(Australia) David Diaz

=== Gateway Tour wins (1) ===
No.	Date	Tournament	Winning score	Margin of victory	Runners-up
1	3 Sep 2004	Desert Series 12	−25 (66-68-62-67=263)	Playoff	(Scotland) Martin Laird, (United States) Joey Snyder

=== Other wins (5) ===
- 2003 Western Australia Open (incorporating the Nedlands Masters)
- 2006 Western Australia Open (incorporating the Nedlands Masters)
- 2010 Cottesloe Open
- 2011 Spalding Park Open
- 2012 Broome Funishings Open

== Results in major championships ==
Tournament	2004
The Open Championship	T36

Note: Felton only played in The Open Championship.
"T" = tied

== Team appearances ==
Amateur

- Eisenhower Trophy: 1998 (individual leader)
