= Jarrod Moseley =

Australian professional golfer

Personal information
- Full name: Jarrod James Moseley
- Nationality: Australia
- Born: 6 October 1972 (age 54) Mandurah, Western Australia, Australia
- Height: 1.80 m (5 ft 11 in)

Career
- Sport: Golf
- Turned professional: 1997
- Former tours: European Tour; PGA Tour of Australasia
- Professional wins: 2

Number of wins by tour
- European Tour: 1
- PGA Tour of Australasia: 2

Best results in major championships
- Masters Tournament: DNP
- PGA Championship: DNP
- U.S. Open: DNP
- The Open Championship: T41: 2000

Achievements and awards
- PGA Tour of Australasia Order of Merit winner: 1998–99
- PGA Tour of Australasia Player of the Year: 1998–99

Jarrod James Moseley (born 6 October 1972) is an Australian professional golfer.

== Career ==
Moseley was born in Mandurah, Western Australia. He turned professional in 1997. He won the PGA Tour of Australasia Order of Merit in 1998/99, having won the European Tour co-sanctioned Heineken Classic during the season. He also went on to finish 16th on the European Tour Order of Merit that season, a career best.

Moseley finished well inside the top 100 on the European Tour Order of Merit every season until 2004, when he slipped to 117th, missing out on retaining his card by just one place. He regained his playing privileges immediately via the end of season qualifying school, but was again unable to replicate his form from previous years as he slipped further down the money list.

== Amateur wins ==
- 1996 Riversdale Cup, Malaysian Amateur Championship

== Professional wins (2) ==
=== European Tour wins (1) ===
No.	Date	Tournament	Winning score	Margin of victory	Runners-up
1	31 Jan 1999	Heineken Classic^{1}	−14 (68-68-69-69=274)	1 stroke	(South Africa) Ernie Els, (Germany) Bernhard Langer, (Australia) Peter Lonard

^{1}Co-sanctioned by the PGA Tour of Australasia

=== PGA Tour of Australasia wins (2) ===
No.	Date	Tournament	Winning score	Margin of victory	Runners-up
1	31 Jan 1999	Heineken Classic^{1}	−14 (68-68-69-69=274)	1 stroke	(South Africa) Ernie Els, (Germany) Bernhard Langer, (Australia) Peter Lonard
2	1 Dec 2002	Australian PGA Championship	−17 (64-67-67-73=271)	Shared title with (Australia) Peter Lonard	

*Lonard and Moseley agreed to share the 2002 Australian PGA Championship after failing light caused play to halt after one hole of a playoff.
^{1}Co-sanctioned by the European Tour

PGA Tour of Australasia playoff record (0–1–1)

No.	Year	Tournament	Opponent(s)	Result
1	2002	Australian PGA Championship	(Australia) Peter Lonard	Playoff abandoned after one hole due to darkness; tournament shared
2	2003	MasterCard Masters	(Australia) Robert Allenby, (Australia) Craig Parry, (Australia) Adam Scott	Allenby won with birdie on second extra hole Moseley and Parry eliminated by birdie on first hole

== Results in major championships ==
Tournament	1999	2000	2001	2002	2003
The Open Championship	CUT	T41		T66	CUT

Note: Moseley only played in The Open Championship.

Did not play

CUT = missed the half-way cut
"T" = tied

== Results in World Golf Championships ==
Tournament	1999	2000	2001	2002	2003
Match Play					
Championship	T25		NT^{1}		
Invitational					T82

^{1}Cancelled due to 9/11

Did not play

"T" = Tied
NT = No tournament

== Team appearances ==
Amateur

- Nomura Cup (representing Australia): 1995
- Eisenhower Trophy (representing Australia): 1996 (winners)
