= Western Australia PGA Championship =

Australian golf tournament

CKB WA PGA Championship
Tournament information
- Location: Kalgoorlie, Western Australia, Australia
- Established: 1933
- Course: Kalgoorlie Golf Course
- Par: 72
- Length: 7,328 yards (6,701 m)
- Tours: PGA Tour of Australasia; Von Nida Tour; Australasian Development Tour
- Format: Stroke play
- Prize fund: A$250,000
- Month played: October

Tournament record score
- Aggregate: 264 Kim Felton (2003)
- To par: −24 as above
- Score: 10 and 9 Fred Thompson (1946)

Current champion
- (Australia) Justin Warren

Location map
- Location in Australia Location in Western Australia

The Western Australia PGA Championship, currently known as the CKB WA PGA Championship is a golf tournament on the PGA Tour of Australasia. Since 2012 it has been held at Kalgoorlie Golf Course.

== Winners ==
Year	Tour (Note: ANZ − PGA Tour of Australasia; ANZDT − Australasian Development Tour; FT − Foundation Tour; VNT − Von Nida Tour.)	Winner	Score	To par	Margin of victory	Runner(s)-up	Venue	Ref.
CKB WA PGA Championship
2026	ANZ	(Australia) Justin Warren	277	−11	2 strokes	(Australia) Daniel Gale	Kalgoorlie	
2025	ANZ	(Australia) Austin Bautista	274	−14	1 stroke	(Australia) Jay Mackenzie	Kalgoorlie	
2024	ANZ	(Australia) Jack Buchanan	271	−17	Playoff	(Australia) Jordan Doull	Kalgoorlie	
2023	ANZ	(Australia) Ben Eccles	265	−23	5 strokes	(Australia) Haydn Barron	Kalgoorlie	
2022 (Oct)	ANZ	(Australia) David Micheluzzi	273	−15	3 strokes	(Australia) Ben Ferguson	Kalgoorlie	
2022 (Apr)	ANZ	(Australia) Jay Mackenzie	269	−19	2 strokes	(Australia) Austin Bautista	Kalgoorlie	
2021	ANZ	No tournament due to the COVID-19 pandemic						
TX Civil & Logistics WA PGA Championship
2020		(Australia) Jarryd Felton	203	−13	1 stroke	(Australia) Brett Rumford	Kalgoorlie	
2019 (Oct)	ANZ	(Australia) Darren Beck	272	−16	2 strokes	(Australia) Jarryd Felton	Kalgoorlie	
2019 (May)	ANZ	(New Zealand) Michael Long	274	−14	1 stroke	(Australia) Brody Martin	Kalgoorlie	
2017	ANZ	(Australia) Dimitrios Papadatos	276	−12	1 stroke	(Australia) Rory Bourke	Kalgoorlie	
2016	ANZ	(Australia) Stephen Dartnall	272	−16	1 stroke	(Australia) Aaron Pike (Australia) Lindsay Wilson	Kalgoorlie	
2015	ANZ	(Australia) Brett Rumford	272	−16	2 strokes	(Australia) Daniel Fox	Kalgoorlie	
WA Goldfields PGA Championship
2014	ANZ	(Australia) Ryan Lynch	276	−12	1 stroke	(Australia) Peter Cooke (Australia) Chris Gaunt	Kalgoorlie	
2013	ANZ	(Australia) Jack Wilson	278	−10	Playoff	(New Zealand) Nick Gillespie	Kalgoorlie	
2012	ANZ	(Australia) Peter Wilson	283	−5	2 strokes	(Australia) Glenn Joyner	Kalgoorlie	
Brunel WA PGA Championship
2011	ANZ	(Australia) Michael Wright	273	−15	1 stroke	(Australia) Terry Pilkadaris	The Vines	
WA PGA Championship
2010	ANZ	(Australia) David Bransdon	271	−17	2 strokes	(Australia) Matthew Griffin	Bunbury	
LSM WA PGA Championship
2009	ANZ	(Australia) Andrew Bonhomme	281	−7	1 stroke	(Australia) David Diaz (New Zealand) Hamish Robertson	Bunbury	
Oceanique WA PGA Championship
2008	VNT	(New Zealand) Michael Long	275	−13	3 strokes	(Australia) Matthew Griffin	Port Bouvard	
2007	VNT	(Australia) Jason Norris	281	−7	1 stroke	(Australia) Aaron Townsend	Port Bouvard	
Western Australia PGA Championship
2006	VNT	(Australia) Andrew Pitt	268	−12	1 stroke	(Australia) Dean Alaban	Western Australian	
WA PGA Championship
2005	VNT	(Australia) Adam Bland	273	−15	1 stroke	(Australia) Brad Lamb	Araluen	
2004	VNT	(Australia) Kim Felton (3)	266	−14	3 strokes	(Australia) Benjamin Burge	Western Australian	
2003	VNT	(Australia) Kim Felton (2)	264	−24	8 strokes	(Australia) Adrian Percey	Wanneroo	
Western Australia PGA Championship
2002	ANZ	(Australia) Kim Felton	273	−7	Playoff	(Australia) Euan Walters	Gosnells	
WA PGA Championship
2001	ANZDT	(Australia) Marcus Cain	272	−16	1 stroke	(Australia) Brad Andrews	Royal Perth	
2000	ANZDT	(Australia) Matthew Habgood	274	−14	7 strokes	(Australia) Justin Cooper	Joondalup	
Western Australia PGA Championship
1999	FT	(Australia) Euan Walters						
1998	FT	(Australia) David Armstrong						
1997	FT	(Australia) Stephen Leaney						
1996	FT	(Australia) David Ecob	278	−10	2 strokes	(Australia) Gary Simpson	Joondalup	
1995	FT	(Australia) Greg Chalmers	281	−7	1 stroke	(England) Ben Jackson	Joondalup	
1994	FT	(Australia) Michael Barry	284	−4	3 strokes	(Australia) Stuart Appleby (Australia) Darren Barnes (New Zealand) Elliott Boult (Australia) Robert Farley (Australia) Scott Laycock (New Zealand) Grant Moorehead	Joondalup	
1993	FT	(Australia) Malcolm Baker	284	−4	Playoff	(Australia) David Iwasaki-Smith (Australia) M. Spencer	Joondalup	
1992		(Australia) Brad Andrews (2)						
1991		(Australia) Brad Andrews						
1990		(United States) Mike Colandro						
1989		(Australia) Robert Farley						
1988: No tournament
1987		(Australia) Gerry Taylor						
1986		(Australia) Roger Mackay						
1985		(Australia) Peter Senior						
1984		(Australia) Trevor Osborn						
1984		(Australia) Garry Merrick						
1983		(Australia) Ross Metherell (3)						
1982		(Australia) Peter Mills						
1981		(Australia) Terry Gale						
1980		(Australia) Peter Randall						
1979		(Australia) Richard Coombes						
1978	ANZ	(Australia) Graham Marsh (2)	280	−8	7 strokes	(Australia) Graham Johnson		
1977	ANZ	(Australia) Kel Nagle	283	−5	1 stroke	(New Zealand) Barry Vivian	Sun City	
1976		(Australia) Allan Cooper						
1975		(Australia) Graham Johnson (2)						
1974		(Australia) Graham Johnson						
1973		(Australia) Ross Metherell (2)						
1972		(Australia) Barry Fry						
1971		(Australia) Ross Metherell						
1970		(Australia) Hilary Lawler (2)						
1969		(Australia) Graham Marsh						
1968		(Australia) Roy Draddy (4)						
1967		(Australia) Len Thomas						
1966		(Australia) Hilary Lawler						
1965		(Australia) Les Nicholls (8)						
1964: No tournament
1963		(Australia) Roy Draddy (3)						
1962		(Australia) Roy Draddy (2)						
1961		(Australia) Roy Draddy						
1960		(Australia) Bob Tuohy						
1959		(Australia) Les Nicholls (7)						
1958		(Australia) Les Nicholls (6)						
1957		(Australia) Les Nicholls (5)						
1956		(Australia) Brian Crafter (3)						
1955		(Australia) Brian Crafter (2)						
1954		(Australia) Brian Crafter						
1953		(Australia) Les Nicholls (4)						
1952		(Australia) Les Nicholls (3)						
1951		(Australia) Les Nicholls (2)						
1950		(Australia) Charles Jackson	1 up			(Australia) Les Nicholls	Nedlands	
1949		(Australia) Les Nicholls	309		9 strokes	(Australia) Eric Alberts	Mount Yokine and Royal Perth	
1948		(Australia) Fred Thompson (2)	38 holes			(Australia) Eric Alberts	Royal Perth	
1947		(Australia) Harry Godden	6 and 5			(Australia) Charlie Snow	Royal Fremantle	
1946		(Australia) Fred Thompson	10 and 9			(Australia) Harry Godden	Mount Lawley	
1940–1945: No tournament due to World War II
1939		(Australia) Eric Alberts	6 and 5			(Australia) Fred Thompson	Royal Perth	
1938		(Australia) Tom Howard	4 and 2			(Australia) Dan Cullen	Lake Karrlnyup	
1937		(Australia) Charlie Snow (2)	285		3 strokes	(Australia) Dan Cullen	Royal Fremantle	
1936		(Australia) Charlie Snow	291		8 strokes	(Australia) Tom Howard	Mount Yokine	
1935		(Australia) Ernie Bissett (2)	5 and 4			(Australia) Charlie Snow	Perth	
1934		(Australia) Walter Baldwin	2 and 1			(Australia) Eric Alberts	Lake Karrinyup	
1933		(Australia) Ernie Bissett	5 and 4			(Australia) Charlie Snow	Royal Fremantle	
