= 1987 PGA Tour of Australia =

Golf tour season

1987 PGA Tour of Australia season
- Duration: 27 November 1986 – 30 November 1987
- Number of official events: 15
- Most wins: (Australia) Peter Senior (3)
- Order of Merit: (Australia) Peter Senior

The 1987 PGA Tour of Australia was the 16th season on the PGA Tour of Australia, the main professional golf tour in Australia since it was formed in 1973.

== Schedule ==
The following table lists official events during the 1987 season.

Date	Tournament	Location	Purse (A$)	Winner (Note: The number in brackets after each winner's name is the number of PGA Tour of Australia events they had won up to and including that tournament. This information is only shown for PGA Tour of Australia members.)	OWGR points	Notes
30 Nov	Air New Zealand Shell Open	New Zealand	NZ$150,000	(Australia) Rodger Davis (6)	20	
7 Dec	Nissan-Mobil New Zealand Open	New Zealand	NZ$120,000	(Australia) Rodger Davis (7)	20	
26 Jan	U-Bix Classic (Note: incorporating the New South Wales PGA Championship.)	Australian Capital Territory	100,000	(Australia) Peter Senior (4)	12	
1 Feb	Foster's Tattersall Tasmanian Open	Tasmania	75,000	(Australia) Brian Jones (4)	12	
8 Feb	Robert Boyd Transport Australian Match Play Championship	Victoria	100,000	(Australia) Ian Baker-Finch (6)	14	
15 Feb	Australian Masters	Victoria	300,000	(Australia) Greg Norman (21)	40	
22 Feb	Robert Boyd Transport Victorian Open	Victoria	110,000	(Australia) Roger Mackay (1)	22	
29 Feb	Rich River Classic	New South Wales	75,000	(Australia) Peter Senior (5)	10	
11 Oct	Konica Queensland Open	Queensland	75,000	(Australia) David Graham (5)	10	
18 Oct	Queensland PGA Championship	Queensland	75,000	(Australia) Peter Senior (6)	10	
25 Oct	National Panasonic New South Wales Open	New South Wales	150,000	(Australia) Craig Parry (1)	18	
1 Nov	ESP Australian PGA Championship	New South Wales	170,000	(Australia) Roger Mackay (2)	16	
15 Nov	West End South Australian Open	South Australia	100,000	(Northern Ireland) Ronan Rafferty (1)	12	
22 Nov	National Panasonic Western Australian Open	Western Australia	80,000	(Australia) Gerry Taylor (1)	12	
30 Nov	National Panasonic Australian Open	Victoria	300,000	(Australia) Greg Norman (22)	40	

== Order of Merit ==
The Order of Merit was based on prize money won during the season, calculated in Australian dollars.

Position	Player	Prize money (A$)
1	(Australia) Peter Senior	94,492
2	(Australia) Roger Mackay	73,994
3	(Australia) Rodger Davis	70,465
4	(Australia) Vaughan Somers	57,165
5	(United States) Mike Colandro	49,731
