= 2002 European Tour =

Golf tour season

2002 European Tour season
- Duration: 22 November 2001 – 10 November 2002
- Number of official events: 44
- Most wins: (South Africa) Ernie Els (3) (Note: Tiger Woods won four events, but was not a European Tour member.)
- Order of Merit: (South Africa) Retief Goosen
- Golfer of the Year: (South Africa) Ernie Els
- Sir Henry Cotton Rookie of the Year: (England) Nick Dougherty

The 2002 European Tour was the 31st season of the European Tour, the main professional golf tour in Europe since its inaugural season in 1972.

== Changes for 2002 ==
There were three new tournaments to the European Tour in 2002, the BMW Asian Open in Taiwan, the Omega Hong Kong Open and the ANZ Championship in Australia. The schedule also saw the return of the Open de Canarias, but this was ultimately combined with the Open de España, and the loss of the Greg Norman Holden International, the Moroccan Open, the São Paulo Brazil Open and the Argentine Open.

== Schedule ==
The following table lists official events during the 2002 season.

Date	Tournament	Host country	Purse	Winner (Note: The number in brackets after each winner's name is the number of European Tour events they had won up to and including that tournament. This information is only shown for European Tour members and are inclusive of the three United States-based major championships which were included on the schedule for the first time in 1998, with earlier editions having retrospectively been recognised as official tour wins.)	OWGR points	Other tours (Note: AFR − Sunshine Tour; ANZ − PGA Tour of Australasia; ASA − Asian PGA Tour; CHA − Challenge Tour.)	Notes
25 Nov	BMW Asian Open	Taiwan	US$1,500,000	(Sweden) Jarmo Sandelin (5)	20	ASA	New tournament
2 Dec	Omega Hong Kong Open	Hong Kong	US$700,000	(Spain) José María Olazábal (22)	16	ASA	New to European Tour
13 Jan	Bell's South African Open	South Africa	£500,000	(South Africa) Tim Clark (1)	32	AFR (Note: Sunshine Tour flagship event)	
20 Jan	Dunhill Championship	South Africa	£500,000	(England) Justin Rose (1)	22	AFR	
27 Jan	Johnnie Walker Classic	Australia	£1,000,000	(South Africa) Retief Goosen (8)	42	ANZ, ASA	
3 Feb	Heineken Classic	Australia	A$2,000,000	(South Africa) Ernie Els (9)	36	ANZ	
10 Feb	ANZ Championship	Australia	A$1,750,000	(Sweden) Richard S. Johnson (1)	20	ANZ	New to European Tour
24 Feb	Caltex Singapore Masters	Singapore	US$900,000	(India) Arjun Atwal (1)	16	ASA	
24 Feb	WGC-Accenture Match Play Championship	United States	US$5,500,000	(United States) Kevin Sutherland (n/a)	76		World Golf Championship
3 Mar	Carlsberg Malaysian Open	Malaysia	US$1,000,000	(Scotland) Alastair Forsyth (1)	16	ASA	
10 Mar	Dubai Desert Classic	UAE	US$1,500,000	(South Africa) Ernie Els (10)	40		
17 Mar	Qatar Masters	Qatar	US$1,500,000	(Australia) Adam Scott (2)	24		
24 Mar	Madeira Island Open	Portugal	€550,000	(Spain) Diego Borrego (2)	24	CHA	
7 Apr	Algarve Open de Portugal	Portugal	€750,000	(Sweden) Carl Pettersson (1)	24		
14 Apr	Masters Tournament	United States	US$5,600,000	(United States) Tiger Woods (n/a)	100		Major championship
28 Apr	Canarias Open de España	Spain	€1,750,000	(Spain) Sergio García (4)	24		
5 May	Novotel Perrier Open de France	France	€2,000,000	(England) Malcolm MacKenzie (1)	24		
12 May	Benson & Hedges International Open	England	£1,100,000	(Argentina) Ángel Cabrera (2)	46		
19 May	Deutsche Bank - SAP Open TPC of Europe	Germany	€2,700,000	(United States) Tiger Woods (n/a)	50		
26 May	Volvo PGA Championship	England	€3,200,000	(Denmark) Anders Hansen (1)	64		Flagship event
2 Jun	Victor Chandler British Masters	England	£1,300,000	(England) Justin Rose (2)	26		
9 Jun	Compass Group English Open	England	£800,000	(Northern Ireland) Darren Clarke (9)	24		
16 Jun	U.S. Open	United States	US$6,250,000	(United States) Tiger Woods (n/a)	100		Major championship
23 Jun	Great North Open	England	£600,000	(England) Miles Tunnicliff (1)	24		
30 Jun	Murphy's Irish Open	Ireland	€1,600,000	(Denmark) Søren Hansen (1)	32		
7 Jul	Smurfit European Open	Ireland	£2,000,000	(New Zealand) Michael Campbell (5)	48		
14 Jul	Barclays Scottish Open	Scotland	£2,200,000	(Argentina) Eduardo Romero (8)	54		
21 Jul	The Open Championship	Scotland	£3,900,000	(South Africa) Ernie Els (11)	100		Major championship
28 Jul	TNT Dutch Open	Netherlands	€1,800,000	(Germany) Tobias Dier (2)	32		
4 Aug	Volvo Scandinavian Masters	Sweden	€1,900,000	(Northern Ireland) Graeme McDowell (1)	26		
11 Aug	Celtic Manor Resort Wales Open	Wales	£1,100,000	(Scotland) Paul Lawrie (5)	24		
18 Aug	PGA Championship	United States	US$5,500,000	(United States) Rich Beem (1)	100		Major championship
18 Aug	North West of Ireland Open	Ireland	€350,000	(Sweden) Adam Mednick (1)	16	CHA	
25 Aug	Diageo Scottish PGA Championship	Scotland	£1,000,000	(Australia) Adam Scott (3)	24		
25 Aug	WGC-NEC Invitational	United States	US$5,500,000	(Australia) Craig Parry (5)	76		World Golf Championship
1 Sep	BMW International Open	Germany	€1,800,000	(Denmark) Thomas Bjørn (7)	24		
8 Sep	Omega European Masters	Switzerland	€1,500,000	(Sweden) Robert Karlsson (5)	34		
15 Sep	Linde German Masters	Germany	€3,000,000	(Australia) Stephen Leaney (4)	50		
22 Sep	WGC-American Express Championship	Ireland	US$5,000,000	(United States) Tiger Woods (n/a)	76		World Golf Championship
6 Oct	Dunhill Links Championship	Scotland	US$5,000,000	(Republic of Ireland) Pádraig Harrington (5)	52		Pro-Am
13 Oct	Trophée Lancôme	France	€1,400,000	(Germany) Alex Čejka (4)	34		
27 Oct	Telefónica Open de Madrid	Spain	€1,400,000	(Denmark) Steen Tinning (2)	24		
3 Nov	Italian Open Telecom Italia	Italy	€1,100,000	(England) Ian Poulter (3)	26		
10 Nov	Volvo Masters Andalucía	Spain	US$3,000,000	(Germany) Bernhard Langer (42) (Scotland) Colin Montgomerie (27)	38		Tour Championship; Title shared (Note: Langer and Montgomerie remained level after two holes of a sudden-death playoff before darkness forced an end to play; they agreed to share the title instead of returning the following day.)

=== Unofficial events ===
The following events were sanctioned by the European Tour, but did not carry official money, nor were wins official.

Date	Tournament	Host country	Purse	Winner(s)	OWGR points	Notes
21 Apr	Seve Trophy	Ireland	n/a	Team GB&I	n/a	Team event
29 Sep	Ryder Cup	England	n/a	Team Europe	n/a	Team event
20 Oct	Cisco World Match Play Championship	England	£1,000,000	(South Africa) Ernie Els	n/a	Limited-field event
18 Nov	WGC-World Cup	Mexico	US$3,000,000	(Japan) Toshimitsu Izawa and (Japan) Shigeki Maruyama	n/a	World Golf Championship; Team event

== Order of Merit ==
The Order of Merit was titled as the Volvo Order of Merit and was based on prize money won during the season, calculated in Euros.

Position	Player	Prize money (€)
1	(South Africa) Retief Goosen	2,360,128
2	(Republic of Ireland) Pádraig Harrington	2,334,655
3	(South Africa) Ernie Els	2,251,708
4	(Scotland) Colin Montgomerie	1,980,720
5	(Argentina) Eduardo Romero	1,811,330
6	(Spain) Sergio García	1,488,728
7	(Australia) Adam Scott	1,361,776
8	(New Zealand) Michael Campbell	1,325,404
9	(England) Justin Rose	1,323,529
10	(Scotland) Paul Lawrie	1,151,434

== Awards ==
Award	Winner	Ref.
Golfer of the Year	(South Africa) Ernie Els	
Sir Henry Cotton Rookie of the Year	(England) Nick Dougherty	

== See also ==
- 2002 European Seniors Tour
