= Mahal Pearce =

New Zealand golfer

Personal information
- Nickname: Taj
- Nationality: New Zealand
- Born: 3 November 1975 (age 50)
- Height: 1.84 m (6 ft 0 in)
- Weight: 90 kg (200 lb; 14 st)

Career
- Sport: Golf
- Turned professional: 1999
- Current tours: OneAsia Tour; PGA Tour of Australasia
- Professional wins: 2

Number of wins by tour
- PGA Tour of Australasia: 1
- Other: 1

Mahal Pearce (born 3 November 1975) is a professional golfer from New Zealand.

== Career ==
He resides in Dunedin, New Zealand. He won the New Zealand Open in 2003.

== Professional wins (2) ==
=== PGA Tour of Australasia wins (1) ===
No.	Date	Tournament	Winning score	Margin of victory	Runner-up
1	19 Jan 2003	Holden New Zealand Open	−10 (69-70-69-70=278)	2 strokes	(Australia) Brett Rumford

=== Von Nida Tour wins (1) ===
No.	Date	Tournament	Winning score	Margin of victory	Runner-up
1	7 Mar 2004	Scenic Circle Hotels Dunedin Classic	−22 (65-62-69-66=262)	7 strokes	(Australia) Richard Swift
