= 2003 PGA Tour of Australasia =

Golf tour season

2003 PGA Tour of Australasia season
- Duration: 16 January 2003 – 21 December 2003
- Number of official events: 9
- Order of Merit: (Australia) Peter Lonard

The 2003 PGA Tour of Australasia was the 31st season on the PGA Tour of Australasia, the main professional golf tour in Australia and New Zealand since it was formed in 1973.

== Schedule ==
The following table lists official events during the 2003 season.

Date	Tournament	Location	Purse (A$)	Winner (Note: The number in brackets after each winner's name is the number of PGA Tour of Australasia events they had won up to and including that tournament. This information is only shown for PGA Tour of Australasia members.)	OWGR points	Other tours (Note: ASA − Asian PGA Tour; EUR − European Tour; NWT − Nationwide Tour.)	Notes
19 Jan	Holden New Zealand Open	New Zealand	NZ$700,000	(New Zealand) Mahal Pearce (1)	16		
2 Feb	Heineken Classic	Victoria	2,000,000	(South Africa) Ernie Els (n/a)	30	EUR	
9 Feb	ANZ Championship	New South Wales	1,750,000	(England) Paul Casey (n/a)	30	EUR	
16 Feb	Johnnie Walker Classic	Western Australia	£1,000,000	(South Africa) Ernie Els (n/a)	44	ASA, EUR	
2 Mar	Jacob's Creek Open	South Australia	US$500,000	(United States) Joe Ogilvie (n/a)	12	NWT	
9 Mar	Clearwater Classic	New Zealand	US$500,000	(United States) Ryan Palmer (n/a)	12	NWT	
7 Dec	MasterCard Masters	Victoria	1,250,000	(Australia) Robert Allenby (8)	18		
14 Dec	Australian PGA Championship	Queensland	1,000,000	(Australia) Peter Senior (18)	16		
21 Dec	Hillross Australian Open	Victoria	1,500,000	(Australia) Peter Lonard (6)	32		Flagship event

== Order of Merit ==
The Order of Merit was based on prize money won during the season, calculated in Australian dollars.

Position	Player	Prize money (A$)
1	(Australia) Peter Lonard	604,000
2	(Australia) Andre Stolz	395,270
3	(Australia) Peter Senior	354,196
4	(Australia) Chris Downes	284,056
5	(Australia) Nick O'Hern	279,470

== Von Nida Tour ==
2003 Von Nida Tour season
- Duration: 13 March 2003 – 23 November 2003
- Number of official events: 10 (Note: One further tournament was scheduled but was cancelled.)
- Most wins: (Australia) Scott Hend (2)
- Order of Merit: (Australia) Scott Hend

The 2003 Von Nida Tour was the inaugural season of the Von Nida Tour, the official development tour to the PGA Tour of Australasia between 2003 and 2008.

=== Schedule ===
The following table lists official events during the 2003 season.

Date	Tournament	Location	Purse (A$)	Winner (Note: The number in brackets after each winner's name is the number of Von Nida Tour events they had won up to and including that tournament. It is rare for someone to accumulate many wins on the Von Nida Tour as success at this level usually leads to promotion to the PGA Tour of Australasia.)	Ref.
16 Mar	Bega Cheese NSW PGA Championship	New South Wales	100,000	(Australia) Chris Downes (1)	
23 Mar	Toyota Southern Classic	New South Wales	100,000	(Australia) Scott Hend (1)	
30 Mar	Volvo Trucks Klassic	New South Wales	75,000	(Australia) Marcus Fraser (1)	
9 May	Schweppes SA PGA Championship	South Australia	100,000	(Australia) Stuart Bouvier (1)	
25 May	WA PGA Championship	Western Australia	100,000	(Australia) Kim Felton (1)	
20 Jul	Queensland Masters	Queensland	100,000	(Australia) Peter Senior (1)	
12 Oct	Links Group Victorian PGA Championship	Victoria	100,000	(Australia) Martin Doyle (1)	
~~26 Oct~~	Victorian Open	Victoria	–	Cancelled	
2 Nov	QLD Group Queensland Open	Queensland	100,000	(Australia) Scott Hend (2)	
9 Nov	Queensland PGA Championship	Queensland	100,000	(Australia) David Diaz (1)	
23 Nov	GolfSkins New South Wales Open	New South Wales	100,000	(Australia) Craig Carmichael (1)	

=== Order of Merit ===
The Order of Merit was based on prize money won during the season, calculated in Australian dollars. The top 10 players on the Order of Merit earned status to play on the 2004 PGA Tour of Australasia.

Position	Player	Prize money (A$)
1	(Australia) Scott Hend	52,007
2	(Australia) Craig Carmichael	36,661
3	(Australia) Chris Downes	34,015
4	(Australia) Stuart Bouvier	27,817
5	(Australia) Matthew Millar	25,959
6	(Australia) Marcus Fraser	24,810
7	(Australia) Euan Walters	24,574
8	(Australia) David Diaz	24,012
9	(Australia) Peter Senior	23,817
10	(Australia) Martin Doyle	23,085
