= Craig Parry =

Australian professional golfer

Personal information
- Full name: Craig David Parry
- Nickname: Popeye
- Nationality: Australia
- Born: 12 January 1966 (age 60) Sunshine, Victoria, Australia
- Height: 1.68 m (5 ft 6 in)
- Weight: 78 kg (172 lb; 12.3 st)
- Spouse: Jenny Parry
- Children: 3

Career
- Sport: Golf
- Turned professional: 1985
- Current tour: PGA Tour of Australasia
- Former tours: PGA Tour; European Tour; Japan Golf Tour
- Professional wins: 23
- Highest ranking: 14 (1 March 1992)

Number of wins by tour
- PGA Tour: 2
- European Tour: 6
- Japan Golf Tour: 2
- Asian Tour: 1
- PGA Tour of Australasia: 12
- Other: 2

Best results in major championships
- Masters Tournament: T13: 1992
- PGA Championship: T19: 1994
- U.S. Open: T3: 1993
- The Open Championship: T4: 1999

Achievements and awards
- PGA Tour of Australasia Order of Merit winner: 1995, 2002, 2007

Craig David Parry (born 12 January 1966) is an Australian professional golfer. He has been one of Australia's premier golfers since turning professional in 1985, and has 23 career victories, two of those wins being events on the PGA Tour; the 2002 WGC-NEC Invitational and the 2004 Ford Championship at Doral.

== Career ==
His first career victory came at the 1987 New South Wales Open and later that year won the Canadian TPC. In 1992 he won three of Australia's top four tournaments, placing first at the Australian PGA Championship, New South Wales Open and the Australian Masters, a tournament he has won three times (in 1992, 1994 and 1996).

Parry first came to the attention of American golf fans during the 1992 Masters Tournament. After finishing tied for 11th in the 1991 U.S. Open, he qualified for the following year's Masters. Parry shared the lead after 36 holes and took sole possession after the third round. However, on Sunday he faltered and finished the tourney tied for 13th.

He won six events on the European Tour, the latest being his play-off victory over fellow Australian Nick O'Hern at the 2005 Heineken Classic, an event which had been dominated by South African superstar Ernie Els the preceding three years. He played the European Tour on a regular basis from 1988 to 1991 and had two top-10 finishes on the Order of Merit: third in 1989 and fifth in 1991. From 1992 until 2006 he played mainly on the PGA Tour, while continuing to compete around the world. Since 2007 he has concentrated on playing the Japan Golf Tour and PGA Tour of Australasia. He has featured in the top 50 of the Official World Golf Ranking.

=== National team participation ===
He has been an integral part of Australian national teams and has been a member of the International Team in three Presidents Cups: 1994, 1996, and 1998. He won the PGA Tour of Australasia's Order of Merit in 1995, 2002 and 2007.

== Personal life ==
Parry was born in Sunshine, Victoria. Parry is married with three children, and divides his time between Sydney and Orlando, Florida.

== Professional wins (23) ==
=== PGA Tour wins (2) ===
Legend
World Golf Championships (1)
Other PGA Tour (1)

No.	Date	Tournament	Winning score	Margin of victory	Runner(s)-up
1	25 Aug 2002	WGC-NEC Invitational	−16 (72-65-66-65=268)	4 strokes	(Australia) Robert Allenby, (United States) Fred Funk
2	10 May 2004	Ford Championship at Doral	−17 (71-65-67-68=271)	Playoff	(United States) Scott Verplank

PGA Tour playoff record (1–0)

No.	Year	Tournament	Opponent	Result
1	2004	Ford Championship at Doral	(United States) Scott Verplank	Won with eagle on first extra hole

=== European Tour wins (6) ===
Legend
World Golf Championships (1)
Other European Tour (5)

No.	Date	Tournament	Winning score	Margin of victory	Runner(s)-up
1	11 Jun 1989	Wang Four Stars	−15 (67-71-66-69=273)	Playoff	(Wales) Ian Woosnam
2	27 Aug 1989	German Open	−18 (66-70-66-64=266)	Playoff	(England) Mark James
3	19 May 1991	Lancia Martini Italian Open	−9 (71-71-67-70=279)	1 stroke	(Wales) Ian Woosnam
4	13 Jul 1991	Bell's Scottish Open	−12 (65-67-69-67=268)	1 stroke	(Zimbabwe) Mark McNulty
5	25 Aug 2002	WGC-NEC Invitational	−16 (72-65-66-65=268)	4 strokes	(Australia) Robert Allenby, (United States) Fred Funk
6	6 Feb 2005	Heineken Classic^{1}	−14 (69-66-65-70=270)	Playoff	(Australia) Nick O'Hern

^{1}Co-sanctioned by the PGA Tour of Australasia

European Tour playoff record (3–0)

No.	Year	Tournament	Opponent	Result
1	1989	Wang Four Stars	(Wales) Ian Woosnam	Won with birdie on first extra hole
2	1989	German Open	(England) Mark James	Won with par on second extra hole
3	2005	Heineken Classic	(Australia) Nick O'Hern	Won with birdie on fourth extra hole

=== PGA of Japan Tour wins (2) ===
Legend
Flagship events (1)
Other PGA of Japan Tour (1)

No.	Date	Tournament	Winning score	Margin of victory	Runner(s)-up
1	16 Apr 1989	Bridgestone Aso Open	−16 (67-69-70-66=272)	6 strokes	(Japan) Yoshiyuki Isomura
2	5 Oct 1997	Japan Open Golf Championship	+2 (73-73-70-70=286)	1 stroke	(Philippines) Frankie Miñoza, (Japan) Seiki Okuda, (Japan) Masashi Ozaki

=== Asian PGA Tour wins (1) ===
No.	Date	Tournament	Winning score	Margin of victory	Runner-up
1	27 Apr 1997	Satelindo Indonesia Open	−8 (67-70-74-69=280)	2 strokes	(South Africa) Des Terblanche

=== PGA Tour of Australasia wins (12) ===
Legend
Flagship events (1)
Other PGA Tour of Australasia (11)

No.	Date	Tournament	Winning score	Margin of victory	Runner(s)-up
1	26 Oct 1987	National Panasonic New South Wales Open	+1 (65-71-74-79=289)	1 stroke	(Australia) Wayne Riley
2	1 Mar 1992	CIG New South Wales Open (2)	−7 (65-73-69-70=277)	Playoff	(Australia) Ken Trimble
3	22 Nov 1992	Ford Australian PGA Championship	−15 (67-67-67-68=269)	3 strokes	(Australia) Peter McWhinney
4	20 Feb 1994	Microsoft Australian Masters	−10 (74-70-70-68=282)	3 strokes	(South Africa) Ernie Els
5	26 Feb 1995	Canon Challenge	−13 (69-69-72-65=275)	3 strokes	(Australia) Wayne Smith
6	3 Dec 1995	Greg Norman's Holden Classic	−16 (65-67-71-73=276)	1 stroke	(New Zealand) Michael Campbell
7	18 Feb 1996	Ericsson Masters (2)	−13 (71-66-71-71=279)	2 strokes	(Australia) Bradley Hughes
8	21 Dec 1997	Schweppes Coolum Classic	−12 (70-68-71-67=276)	3 strokes	(Australia) Robert Allenby
9	21 Nov 1999	Ford South Australian Open	−14 (70-70-70-64=274)	5 strokes	(Scotland) Raymond Russell
10	13 Jan 2002	TelstraSaturn Hyundai New Zealand Open	−11 (67-69-69-68=273)	5 strokes	(New Zealand) Steven Alker, (New Zealand) Michael Campbell, (Australia) Stephen Leaney
11	6 Feb 2005	Heineken Classic^{1}	−14 (69-66-65-70=270)	Playoff	(Australia) Nick O'Hern
12	16 Dec 2007	MFS Australian Open	−11 (74-64-70-69=277)	1 stroke	(Australia) Won Joon Lee, (Australia) Nick O'Hern, (United States) Brandt Snedeker

^{1}Co-sanctioned by the European Tour

PGA Tour of Australasia playoff record (2–4)

No.	Year	Tournament	Opponent(s)	Result
1	1988	Australian Masters	(Australia) Ian Baker-Finch, (Australia) Roger Mackay	Baker-Finch won with birdie on first extra hole
2	1990	Australian Open	(United States) John Morse	Lost to par on first extra hole
3	1992	CIG New South Wales Open	(Australia) Ken Trimble	Won with par on third extra hole
4	2003	MasterCard Masters	(Australia) Robert Allenby, (Australia) Jarrod Moseley, (Australia) Adam Scott	Allenby won with birdie on second extra hole Moseley and Parry eliminated by birdie on first hole
5	2005	Heineken Classic	(Australia) Nick O'Hern	Won with birdie on fourth extra hole
6	2011	BMW New Zealand Open	(Australia) Brad Kennedy	Lost to birdie on first extra hole

=== Canadian Tour wins (1) ===
No.	Date	Tournament	Winning score	Margin of victory	Runner-up
1	6 Sep 1987	Payless Canadian Tournament Players Championship	−10 (65-71-72-66=274)	Playoff	(United States) John Cyboran

=== Other wins (1) ===
No.	Date	Tournament	Winning score	Margin of victory	Runner-up
1	16 Feb 1992	Pyramid Australian Masters	−9 (72-76-67-68=283)	3 strokes	(Australia) Greg Norman

== Results in major championships ==
Tournament	1987	1988	1989
Masters Tournament			
U.S. Open			
The Open Championship	CUT	CUT	
PGA Championship			

Tournament	1990	1991	1992	1993	1994	1995	1996	1997	1998	1999
Masters Tournament	CUT		T13	T45	T30					T48
U.S. Open	46	T11	T33	T3	T25		T90	T43		T34
The Open Championship	T22	8	T28	T59	T77	CUT	CUT	CUT	CUT	T4
PGA Championship	T40	T43		T31	T19	CUT	T65	CUT	T71	CUT

Tournament	2000	2001	2002	2003	2004	2005	2006	2007	2008
Masters Tournament	T25			T39	CUT	T25			
U.S. Open	T37		CUT	CUT	T60	CUT			CUT
The Open Championship	T36		CUT	T59	CUT	CUT			T70
PGA Championship	CUT		CUT	CUT	T55	CUT			

Top 10
Did not play

CUT = missed the half-way cut
"T" = tied

=== Summary ===
Tournament	Wins	2nd	3rd	Top-5	Top-10	Top-25	Events	Cuts made
Masters Tournament	0	0	0	0	0	3	9	7
U.S. Open	0	0	1	1	1	3	14	10
The Open Championship	0	0	0	1	2	3	18	9
PGA Championship	0	0	0	0	0	1	14	7
Totals	0	0	1	2	3	10	55	33

- Most consecutive cuts made – 17 (1990 U.S. Open – 1994 PGA)
- Longest streak of top-10s – 1 (three times)

== Results in The Players Championship ==
Tournament	1990	1991	1992	1993	1994	1995	1996	1997	1998	1999
The Players Championship	T61	T15	T6	CUT	T14	CUT	T53	T22	CUT	69

Tournament	2000	2001	2002	2003	2004	2005	2006
The Players Championship	T22	T33	T57	CUT	T13	T40	T22

Top 10

CUT = missed the half-way cut
"T" indicates a tie for a place.

== World Golf Championships ==
=== Wins (1) ===
Year	Championship	54 holes	Winning score	Margin	Runners-up
2002	WGC-NEC Invitational	Tied for lead	−16 (72-65-66-65=268)	4 strokes	(Australia) Robert Allenby, (United States) Fred Funk

=== Results timeline ===
Tournament	1999	2000	2001	2002	2003	2004	2005	2006	2007	2008
Match Play	R32	R64	R32		R64		R32			
Championship	T20		NT^{1}	T49	T54			58		T73
Invitational	T3			1	T64	T65	T58			79

^{1}Cancelled due to 9/11

Win
Top 10
Did not play

QF, R16, R32, R64 = Round in which player lost in match play
"T" = tied
NT = No Tournament

== Team appearances ==
Amateur

- Nomura Cup (representing Australia): 1985 (winners)

Professional

- Four Tours World Championship (representing Australasia):: 1988, 1989, 1990 (winners), 1991
- Alfred Dunhill Cup (representing Australia): 1991, 1993, 1995, 1998, 1999
- Presidents Cup (International Team): 1994, 1996, 1998 (winners)
- World Cup (representing Australia): 2002
