= Euan Walters =

Australian professional golfer (born 1970)

Personal information
- Nationality: Australia
- Born: 12 November 1970 (age 55) Melbourne, Australia
- Height: 6 ft 0 in (1.83 m)
- Weight: 200 lb (91 kg; 14 st)

Career
- Sport: Golf
- Turned professional: 1994
- Current tour: PGA Tour of Australasia
- Former tours: Nationwide Tour; PGA Tour
- Professional wins: 12

Number of wins by tour
- PGA Tour of Australasia: 1
- Korn Ferry Tour: 1
- Other: 11

Best results in major championships
- Masters Tournament: DNP
- PGA Championship: DNP
- U.S. Open: CUT: 2005
- The Open Championship: CUT: 2005

Euan Walters (born 12 November 1970) is an Australian professional golfer.

== Career ==
Walters was born in Melbourne, Australia in 1970.

In 1994, Walters turned professional. Walters has played on the PGA Tour of Australasia since 1996. He won one tournament, the 2004 Jacob's Creek Open Championship, which was co-sanctioned by the Nationwide Tour. This earned him membership on the Nationwide Tour for the rest of 2004 and he finished 14th on the money list, earning him his PGA Tour card for 2005. On the 2005 PGA Tour, he made only two cuts in 18 events and his best finish was T-62 at the WGC-American Express Championship. He played the Nationwide Tour again in 2006 and then resumed playing on the PGA Tour of Australasia.

== Professional wins (12) ==
=== PGA Tour of Australasia wins (1) ===
No.	Date	Tournament	Winning score	Margin of victory	Runners-up
1	22 Feb 2004	Jacob's Creek Open^{1}	−9 (66-71-70-68=275)	5 strokes	(Australia) Brendan Jones, (Australia) Wayne Grady, (Australia) Anthony Painter

^{1}Co-sanctioned by the Nationwide Tour

PGA Tour of Australasia playoff record (0–1)

No.	Year	Tournament	Opponent	Result
1	2002	Western Australia PGA Championship	(Australia) Kim Felton	Lost to par on first extra hole

=== Nationwide Tour wins (1) ===
No.	Date	Tournament	Winning score	Margin of victory	Runners-up
1	22 Feb 2004	Jacob's Creek Open^{1}	−9 (66-71-70-68=275)	5 strokes	(Australia) Brendan Jones, (Australia) Wayne Grady, (Australia) Anthony Painter

^{1}Co-sanctioned by the PGA Tour of Australasia

=== Other wins (2) ===
- 1999 New South Wales PGA Championship, Western Australia PGA Championship

=== PGA of Australia Legends Tour wins (9) ===
- 2023 Curlewis Legends Pro-Am, QUBE Logistics Legends Pro-Am @ Aston Hills Golf Club (with Peter Fowler), LDC Moree Legends Pro-Am (with Tim Elliot), Gold Coast Senior PGA Championship
- 2024 Belle Property Mt Coolum Legends Pro-Am
- 2025 Living Choice Flagstaff Hill Legends Pro-Am, Metro Homes Glenn Joyner Memorial Legends Pro-Am, Wantima CC Legends Pro-Am (with Peter Lonard), Gold Coast Senior PGA Championship

== Results in major championships ==
Tournament	2005
U.S. Open	CUT
The Open Championship	CUT

CUT = missed the halfway cut
Note: Walters never played in the Masters Tournament or the PGA Championship.

== Results in World Golf Championships ==
Tournament	2005
Match Play	
Championship	T62
Invitational	

Did not play

"T" = Tied

== See also ==
- 2004 Nationwide Tour graduates
