= Dunedin Classic =

Golf tournament

Scenic Circle Hotels Dunedin Classic
Tournament information
- Location: Dunedin, New Zealand
- Established: 2001
- Course: Chisholm Park Golf Links
- Par: 71
- Length: 6,342 yards (5,799 m)
- Tours: PGA Tour of Australasia; Von Nida Tour; Australasian Development Tour
- Format: Stroke play
- Prize fund: A$100,000
- Month played: March

Tournament record score
- Aggregate: 262 Mahal Pearce (2004)
- To par: −22 as above

Final champion
- (New Zealand) Mahal Pearce

Location map
- Location in New Zealand

The Dunedin Classic was a professional golf tournament played at the Chisholm Park Golf Links near Dunedin, New Zealand. It was played in 2001, 2002 and 2004. Prize money was A$100,000 in 2001 and 2004 and A$125,000 in 2002. The events were sponsored by Scenic Circle Hotels.

== Winners ==
Year	Tour (Note: ANZ − PGA Tour of Australasia; ANZDT − Australasian Development Tour; VNT − Von Nida Tour.)	Winner	Score	To par	Margin of victory	Runner-up	Ref.
Scenic Circle Hotels Dunedin Classic
2004	VNT	(New Zealand) Mahal Pearce	262	−22	7 strokes	(Australia) Richard Swift	
2003: No tournament
2002	ANZ	(New Zealand) Gareth Paddison	267	−17	3 strokes	(Australia) Brad Andrews	
2001	ANZDT	(Australia) David Podlich	205 (Note: Shortened to 54 holes due to weather.)	−8	4 strokes	(New Zealand) Greg Turner	
