= Peter Lonard =

Australian professional golfer (born 1967)

Personal information
- Full name: Peter Lawrence Lonard
- Nationality: Australia
- Born: 17 July 1967 (age 59) Epping, Sydney, Australia
- Height: 1.82 m (5 ft 11 1/2 in)

Career
- Sport: Golf
- Turned professional: 1989
- Current tour: PGA Tour of Australasia
- Former tours: European Tour; PGA Tour; Web.com Tour
- Professional wins: 30
- Highest ranking: 23 (22 May 2005)

Number of wins by tour
- PGA Tour: 1
- PGA Tour of Australasia: 9
- Other: 20

Best results in major championships
- Masters Tournament: CUT: 2003, 2004, 2005, 2006, 2008
- PGA Championship: T17: 2002
- U.S. Open: 11th: 2002
- The Open Championship: T14: 2002

Achievements and awards
- PGA Tour of Australasia Order of Merit winner: 1996–97, 2003

Peter Lawrence Lonard (born 17 July 1967) is an Australian professional golfer who played mainly on the U.S.-based PGA Tour.

== Career ==
In 1967, Lonard was born in Epping, New South Wales.

In 1989, Lonard turned professional. He began his career on the PGA Tour of Australasia. He played on the European Tour in 1991 and 1992, where he had very moderate results. He was sidelined for nearly 18 months in 1993–94 after contracting Ross River Fever, a mosquito-carried virus which caused damage to his eyes. He worked as a club professional at Sydney's prestigious Oatlands Golf Club for three years before returning to tournament golf, topping the PGA Tour of Australasia Order of Merit in 1996/97. He returned to the European Tour in 1997 and has performed steadily with a best Order of Merit placing of 18th in 2002.

Lonard joined the United States–based PGA Tour in 2002 and settled in well, winning over $1 million in his first season. He won the PGA Tour of Australasia's Order of Merit for a second time in 2003. His first win in the U.S. came at the 2005 MCI Heritage. He has featured in the top 50 of the Official World Golf Ranking. In 2009, he finished outside the top 150 of the money list and lost his PGA Tour card. He has mainly focused on the PGA Tour of Australasia and Web.com Tour since losing his PGA Tour card.

Lonard was a member of the International Team at the Presidents Cup in 2003 and 2005.

After turning 50, Lonard played in the Senior Open Championship in 2017 and finished T3.

== Awards and honors ==
During the 1996-97 and 2003 seasons, Lonard won the PGA Tour of Australasia Order of Merit

== Professional wins (30) ==
=== PGA Tour wins (1) ===
No.	Date	Tournament	Winning score	To par	Margin of victory	Runners-up
1	17 Apr 2005	MCI Heritage	62-74-66-75=277	−7	2 strokes	(United States) Billy Andrade, (Northern Ireland) Darren Clarke, (United States) Jim Furyk, (United States) Davis Love III

=== PGA Tour of Australasia wins (9) ===
Legend
Flagship events (2)
Tour Championships (1)
Other PGA Tour of Australasia (6)

No.	Date	Tournament	Winning score	To par	Margin of victory	Runner(s)-up
1	16 Feb 1997	Ericsson Masters	69-69-69-69=276	−16	Playoff	(Australia) Peter O'Malley
2	10 Dec 2000	Ford South Australian Open	69-65-67-68=269	−19	6 strokes	(Australia) Paul Gow
3	25 Feb 2001	ANZ Tour Championship	67-67-69-66=269	−15	1 stroke	(Australia) Nathan Green
4	1 Dec 2002	Australian PGA Championship	64-68-71-68=271	−17	Shared title with (Australia) Jarrod Moseley	
5	8 Dec 2002	MasterCard Masters (2)	70-72-71-66=279	−9	Playoff	(Australia) Gavin Coles, (Australia) Adam Scott
6	21 Dec 2003	Australian Open	68-72-70-69=279	−9	1 stroke	(Australia) Chris Downes, (Australia) Stephen Leaney
7	28 Nov 2004	Hillross Australian Open (2)	71-71-71-68=281	−3	1 stroke	(Australia) Stuart Appleby
8	5 Dec 2004	Cadbury Schweppes Australian PGA Championship (2)	69-65-71-65=270	−18	2 strokes	(Australia) James Nitties
9	9 Dec 2007	Cadbury Schweppes Australian PGA Championship (3)	66-69-68-65=268	−20	3 strokes	(New Zealand) David Smail

*Lonard and Moseley agreed to share the 2002 Australian PGA Championship after failing light caused play to halt after one hole of a playoff.

PGA Tour of Australasia playoff record (2–1–1)

No.	Year	Tournament	Opponent(s)	Result
1	1997	Ericsson Masters	(Australia) Peter O'Malley	Won with par on second extra hole
2	2002	Australian PGA Championship	(Australia) Jarrod Moseley	Playoff abandoned after one hole due to darkness; tournament shared
3	2002	MasterCard Masters	(Australia) Gavin Coles, (Australia) Adam Scott	Won with par on third extra hole Scott eliminated by par on first hole
4	2006	Cadbury Schweppes Australian PGA Championship	(Australia) Nick O'Hern	Lost to birdie on fourth extra hole

=== Von Nida Tour wins (1) ===
No.	Date	Tournament	Winning score	To par	Margin of victory	Runner-up
1	21 Nov 2004	NSW Open	69-65-67-69=270	−18	2 strokes	(Australia) Anthony Summers

=== Other wins (1) ===
No.	Date	Tournament	Winning score	To par	Margin of victory	Runners-up
1	17 Nov 2002	Hyundai Team Matches (with (United States) Rich Beem)	2 and 1			(United States) Mark Calcavecchia and (United States) Fred Couples

=== PGA of Australia Legends Tour wins (18) ===
- 2018 (1) Ladbrokes Australian Golf Club Pro-Am
- 2019 (5) Pro Weld Construction Legends Pro-Am, Brisbane Legends Pro-Am (with Rodger Davis), JL Pierce Transport Legends Pro-Am (with David Fearns), Sylvania BMW Legends Pro-Am Tournament, Australian Legends Tour Championship
- 2020 (2) RACV Cape Schanck Battle Legends (with Simon Tooman), Australian Valve Group Legends Pro-Am (with Grant Fyander)
- 2022 (1) Blackheath Legends Pro-Am
- 2023 (1) Hahn Shelly Beach Legends Pro-Am
- 2024 (2) Moama Masters Rich River, The Blackheath Centenary Year Legends Pro-Am
- 2025 (5) Undercover Roasters Legends Pro-Am (with Brad Burns), Maffra Legends Pro-Am, Wantima CC Legends Pro-Am (with Euan Walters), Mollymook NSW Senior Masters, Bentley Sydney Castle Hill Legends Pro-Am
- 2026 (1) Undercover Roasters Legends Pro-Am

== Results in major championships ==
Tournament	1997	1998	1999	2000	2001	2002	2003	2004	2005	2006	2007	2008
Masters Tournament							CUT	CUT	CUT	CUT		CUT
U.S. Open					T66	11	T20	T31	T42			
The Open Championship	T24		T49		T47	T14	T59	CUT	66	T16		
PGA Championship	CUT	CUT				T17	T29	CUT	CUT	CUT		T68

Did not play

CUT = missed the half-way cut
"T" = tied

=== Summary ===
Tournament	Wins	2nd	3rd	Top-5	Top-10	Top-25	Events	Cuts made
Masters Tournament	0	0	0	0	0	0	5	0
U.S. Open	0	0	0	0	0	2	5	5
The Open Championship	0	0	0	0	0	3	8	7
PGA Championship	0	0	0	0	0	1	8	3
Totals	0	0	0	0	0	6	26	15

- Most consecutive cuts made – 6 (1999 Open Championship – 2002 PGA)
- Longest streak of top-10s – 0

== Results in The Players Championship ==
Tournament	2003	2004	2005	2006	2007	2008	2009
The Players Championship	T56	CUT	CUT	T45	T6	CUT	CUT

Top 10

CUT = missed the halfway cut
"T" indicates a tie for a place

== Results in World Golf championships ==
Tournament	2002	2003	2004	2005	2006	2007	2008
Match Play		4	R32	R64	R64		
Championship	T54	37	T23	T37			
Invitational	T19	T23	T32	T36	T71	T4	T6

Top 10
Did not play

QF, R16, R32, R64 = Round in which player lost in match play
"T" = Tied

== Results in senior major championships ==
Tournament	2017	2018
The Tradition		
Senior PGA Championship		T23
U.S. Senior Open		
Senior Players Championship		T24
Senior British Open Championship	T3	T24

Top 10
Did not play

"T" indicates a tie for a place

== Team appearances ==
- Presidents Cup (International Team): 2003 (tie), 2005
- WGC-World Cup (representing Australia): 2005

== See also ==
- 2001 PGA Tour Qualifying School graduates
- Lowest rounds of golf
