= Huntingdale Golf Club =

Golf club in Melbourne, Australia

- Interactive map of Huntingdale Golf Club
- 37.92°S 145.10°E

Club information
- Location: Melbourne, Australia
- Established: 1941
- Type: Private
- Tota holes: 18
- Tournaments: Australian Masters
- Website: www.huntingdalegolf.com.au
- Designed by: Sam Beriman
- Par: 72
- Length: 6,980 yards

Huntingdale Golf Club is a golf club located in Oakleigh South, Melbourne, Australia.

The origins of what would become Huntingdale Golf Club began in 1924, when a Committee leased some property in Doncaster Road, Doncaster and laid out an 18-hole course amid the surrounding orchards. The same Committee took over the assets of the Box Hill Golf Club and re-established it at the Doncaster Road site, under the name of Eastern Golf Club as it is known today.

In the years prior to the second World War, there had been many discussions on the merit of transferring the club on to the famous sandbelt area in the south east of Melbourne, but plans were held in abeyance due to the lack of suitable ground being available.

Early in 1938 a chance remark by one of the members elicited the fact that Mrs Creswick was considering the disposal of the old Melbourne Hunt Club grounds at East Oakleigh. The course design was entrusted to C.H. Alison, an English golf architect, who worked entirely from models, contour plans, and written information as to the topography of the ground. Former curator, the late Sam Beriman, was co-opted to adapt Allison's designs to the terrain. The course opened in 1941, and it was at that time the name Huntingdale Golf Club was adopted. Today with its development as a Club, and advancement as an Australian Championship Golf Course, the future of Huntingdale Golf Club is secure.

Rising to fame in March 1979 with the inaugural hosting of the Australian Masters, Huntingdale has emerged as one of the most recognisable golf courses in Australia, and the world. Since 1979, Huntingdale has played host to some of the most famous names in world golf, including Jack Nicklaus, Greg Norman, Peter Thomson, Gary Player, Arnold Palmer, Nick Faldo, Bernhard Langer, Ian Woosnam, Ian Baker-Finch, Tom Watson, Nick Price, and Tiger Woods.

In 2008, Huntingdale celebrated the 30th year of hosting the Australian Masters and was recognised as the 'Home of the Australian Masters'.

Huntingdale hosted the Australian Masters since its inception in 1979. However, this long association was broken in 2009, when the tournament began a venue rotation policy.

== See also ==
- List of links golf courses
