= 2004 PGA Tour of Australasia =

Golf tour season

2004 PGA Tour of Australasia season
- Duration: 15 January 2004 – 12 December 2004
- Number of official events: 9
- Most wins: (Australia) Peter Lonard (2)
- Order of Merit: (Australia) Richard Green

The 2004 PGA Tour of Australasia was the 32nd season on the PGA Tour of Australasia, the main professional golf tour in Australia and New Zealand since it was formed in 1973.

== Schedule ==
The following table lists official events during the 2004 season.

Date	Tournament	Location	Purse (A$)	Winner (Note: The number in brackets after each winner's name is the number of PGA Tour of Australasia events they had won up to and including that tournament. This information is only shown for PGA Tour of Australasia members.)	OWGR points	Other tours (Note: ASA − Asian Tour; EUR − European Tour; NWT − Nationwide Tour.)	Notes
18 Jan	Holden New Zealand Open	New Zealand	NZ$700,000	(Australia) Terry Price (5)	16		
1 Feb	Johnnie Walker Classic	South Australia	£1,000,000	(Spain) Miguel Ángel Jiménez (n/a)	24	ASA, EUR	
8 Feb	Heineken Classic	Victoria	2,000,000	(South Africa) Ernie Els (n/a)	34	EUR	
15 Feb	ANZ Championship	New South Wales	1,750,000	(England) Brian Davis (n/a)	20	EUR	
22 Feb	Jacob's Creek Open	South Australia	US$700,000	(Australia) Euan Walters (1)	12	NWT	
18 Mar	New Zealand PGA Championship	New Zealand	US$700,000	(Australia) Gavin Coles (2)	12	NWT	
28 Nov	Hillross Australian Open	New South Wales	1,500,000	(Australia) Peter Lonard (7)	32		Flagship event
5 Dec	Cadbury Schweppes Australian PGA Championship	Queensland	1,000,000	(Australia) Peter Lonard (8)	22		
12 Dec	MasterCard Masters	Victoria	1,250,000	(Australia) Richard Green (1)	26		

== Order of Merit ==
The Order of Merit was based on prize money won during the season, calculated in Australian dollars.

Position	Player	Prize money (A$)
1	(Australia) Richard Green	365,017
2	(Australia) Euan Walters	287,070
3	(Australia) Gavin Coles	248,872
4	(Australia) Nick O'Hern	242,274
5	(Australia) Adam Scott	232,097

== Von Nida Tour ==
2004 Von Nida Tour season
- Duration: 23 January 2004 – 21 November 2004
- Number of official events: 11
- Most wins: (Australia) Kim Felton (3)
- Order of Merit: (Australia) Kim Felton

The 2004 Von Nida Tour was the second season of the Von Nida Tour, the official development tour to the PGA Tour of Australasia between 2003 and 2008.

=== Schedule ===
The following table lists official events during the 2004 season.

Date	Tournament	Location	Purse (A$)	Winner (Note: The number in brackets after each winner's name is the number of Von Nida Tour events they had won up to and including that tournament. It is rare for someone to accumulate many wins on the Von Nida Tour as success at this level usually leads to promotion to the PGA Tour of Australasia.)	Ref.
25 Jan	Mitsubishi Motors Victorian Open	Victoria	100,000	(New Zealand) Gareth Paddison (1)	
7 Mar	Scenic Circle Hotels Dunedin Classic	New Zealand	100,000	(New Zealand) Mahal Pearce (1)	
14 Mar	Bega Cheese NSW PGA Championship	New South Wales	105,000	(Australia) Matthew Ecob (1)	
21 Mar	Toyota Southern Classic	New South Wales	100,000	(Australia) Brad McIntosh (1)	
2 May	Schweppes SA PGA Championship	South Australia	100,000	(Australia) Martin Doyle (2)	
30 May	WA PGA Championship	Western Australia	100,000	(Australia) Kim Felton (2)	
27 Jun	Queensland Masters	Queensland	105,000	(Australia) Kim Felton (3)	
4 Jul	Cairns Classic	Queensland	105,000	(Australia) Kim Felton (4)	
7 Nov	QLD Group Queensland Open	Queensland	105,000	(Australia) Steven Bowditch (1)	
14 Nov	Toyota Queensland PGA Championship	Queensland	105,000	(Australia) Kurt Barnes (1)	
21 Nov	NSW Open	New South Wales	100,000	(Australia) Peter Lonard (1)	

=== Order of Merit ===
The Order of Merit was based on prize money won during the season, calculated in Australian dollars. The top 10 players on the Order of Merit earned status to play on the 2005 PGA Tour of Australasia.

Position	Player	Prize money (A$)
1	(Australia) Kim Felton	46,500
2	(Australia) Brad McIntosh	31,385
3	(Australia) Nigel Spence	
4	(Australia) Ricky Schmidt	
