= Terrey Hills Golf & Country Club =

Golf club in Terry Hills, New South Wales

- Interactive map of Terrey Hills Golf & Country Club

The Terrey Hills Golf & Country Club is a golf club in Terrey Hills, New South Wales, Australia. It hosted the Women's Australian Open in 2003 when the champion was Mhairi McKay of Scotland.

== See also ==
- List of golf courses in New South Wales
