= Peter Senior =

Australian professional golfer (born 1959)

Peter Senior OAM
Personal information
- Full name: Peter Albert Charles Senior
- Nationality: Australia
- Born: 31 July 1959 (age 67) Singapore
- Height: 1.70 m (5 ft 7 in)

Career
- Sport: Golf
- Turned professional: 1978
- Former tours: PGA Tour; European Tour; Japan Golf Tour; PGA Tour of Australasia; Champions Tour; European Senior Tour
- Professional wins: 67
- Highest ranking: 23 (28 November 1993)

Number of wins by tour
- European Tour: 4
- Japan Golf Tour: 3
- PGA Tour of Australasia: 21
- European Senior Tour: 1
- Other: 38

Best results in major championships
- Masters Tournament: T42: 1990
- PGA Championship: T44: 1995
- U.S. Open: CUT: 1990
- The Open Championship: T4: 1993

Achievements and awards
- PGA Tour of Australasia Order of Merit winner: 1987, 1989, 1993, 2012
- PGA Tour of Australasia Player of the Year: 1993

Peter Albert Charles Senior OAM (born 31 July 1959) is an Australian professional golfer who has won more than twenty tournaments around the world.

Senior has competed mainly on the PGA Tour of Australasia, where he has had the most success and won the Order of Merit on four occasions, and the European Tour. He has also played occasionally on the Japan Golf Tour and the United States–based PGA Tour.

Senior has represented Australia in international competitions several times, and was a member of the International Team at the first two stagings of the Presidents Cup. He has also represented Australia twice at the World Cup.

== Career ==
In 1959, Senior was born in Singapore.

In 1978, Senior turned professional. He joined the PGA Tour of Australasia shortly thereafter. During his career, he has won 21 tournaments on the tour, including the Australian PGA Championship in 1989, 2003 and 2010, the Australian Open in 1989 and 2012, and the Australian Masters in 1991, 1995, and 2015. Senior has won professional events on the main men's tour in five separate decades, a feat achieved by very few players previously anywhere in the world. He also has the distinction of winning the Australian PGA, Open and Masters tournaments after he turned 50. He also topped the tour's Order of Merit in 1987, 1989 and 1993. Even after reaching the age of fifty, he remained competitive on the tour, through until his retirement from golf in 2016.

Between 1984 and 1992, Senior competed on the European Tour full-time, winning four tournaments and finishing a career best of 7th on the Order of Merit in 1987. He also played regularly on the Japanese Tour, winning three tournaments before rejoining the European Tour in 1998. Through the 2007 season he continued to play in a small number of tournaments on the tour.

In 1985, Senior finished 5th at the PGA Tour Qualifying Tournament to earn his card for the following season. He did not have much success, making just two cuts in the first half of the season, before he elected to return to Europe. He did play in several PGA Tour events in other seasons, notably finishing tied for second in The International in 1990, but never tried to qualify for the tour again.

Senior made his debut on the over-50 circuit the Champions Tour in February 2010 at The ACE Group Classic. Senior has yet to win on the Champions Tour, but has finished as a runner up on six occasions, with three playoff defeats. One of these came in February 2012 at the Allianz Championship, when Senior birdied the final hole of regulation to make the playoff before losing to Corey Pavin with a birdie on the first playoff hole.

Senior announced his retirement during the second round of the 2016 Australian Open held at The Royal Sydney Golf Club. Senior suffered a hip injury on the sixth hole and announced his retirement from professional golf shortly after.

== Personal life ==
He lives in Hope Island, Queensland, with his wife June, whom he married in 1984. They have three children: Krystlle, Jasmine and Mitchell.

== Awards and honors ==
- Senior won the PGA Tour of Australasia's Order of Merit four times: in 1987, 1989, 1993, and 2012
- In 1993, Senior was the PGA Tour of Australasia's Player of the Year
- In 2024, Senior was awarded the Medal of the Order of Australia in the 2024 King's Birthday Honours for his service to golf

== Professional wins (67) ==
=== European Tour wins (4) ===
No.	Date	Tournament	Winning score	Margin of victory	Runner-up
1	10 Aug 1986	PLM Open	−11 (69-72-64-68=273)	2 strokes	(Sweden) Mats Lanner
2	27 Jun 1987	Johnnie Walker Monte Carlo Open	−16 (66-63-65-66=260)	1 stroke	(Australia) Rodger Davis
3	9 Sep 1990	Panasonic European Open	−13 (67-68-66-66=267)	1 stroke	(Wales) Ian Woosnam
4	10 May 1992	Benson & Hedges International Open	−1 (74-73-70-70=287)	Playoff	(Zimbabwe) Tony Johnstone

European Tour playoff record (1–0)

No.	Year	Tournament	Opponent	Result
1	1992	Benson & Hedges International Open	(Zimbabwe) Tony Johnstone	Won with par on first extra hole

=== PGA of Japan Tour wins (3) ===
No.	Date	Tournament	Winning score	Margin of victory	Runner(s)-up
1	19 Apr 1992	Bridgestone Aso Open	−7 (70-70-70-71=281)	1 stroke	(Canada) Rick Gibson
2	2 May 1993	The Crowns	−10 (68-67-69-66=270)	1 stroke	(United States) Gary Hallberg, (Japan) Masashi Ozaki
3	23 Apr 1995	Dunlop Open^{1}	−9 (69-70-67-73=279)	5 strokes	(United States) Brian Watts

^{1}Co-sanctioned by the Asia Golf Circuit

=== PGA Tour of Australasia wins (21) ===
Legend
Flagship events (1)
Other PGA Tour of Australasia (20)

No.	Date	Tournament	Winning score	Margin of victory	Runner(s)-up
1	25 Feb 1979	Dunhill South Australian Open	−6 (70-72-70-70=282)	Playoff	(Australia) Graham Stevens (a)
2	14 Oct 1984	Stefan Queensland Open	−6 (68-71-70-73=282)	7 strokes	(Australia) Wayne Grady
3	25 Nov 1984	Honeywell Classic (Note: incorporating the New South Wales PGA Championship)	−18 (71-70-67-66=274)	2 strokes	(Australia) Ossie Moore
4	25 Jan 1987	U-Bix Classic (2)	−19 (67-65-72-69=273)	1 stroke	(Australia) Gerry Taylor
5	1 Mar 1987	Rich River Classic	−15 (62-68-71-72=273)	2 strokes	(Australia) Mike Ferguson
6	18 Oct 1987	Queensland PGA Championship	−10 (67-72-71-68=278)	Playoff	(Australia) Jeff Woodland
7	12 Nov 1989	Australian PGA Championship	−14 (67-68-68-71=274)	1 stroke	(United States) Jim Benepe
8	3 Dec 1989	Australian Open	−17 (66-66-69-70=271)	7 strokes	(Australia) Peter Fowler
9	10 Dec 1989	Johnnie Walker Australian Classic	−12 (65-72-70-69=276)	5 strokes	(Australia) Greg Norman
10	17 Feb 1991	Pyramid Australian Masters	−14 (68-71-69-70=278)	1 stroke	(Australia) Greg Norman
11	8 Dec 1991	Johnnie Walker Australian Classic (2)	−10 (66-71-72-73=282)	1 stroke	(Australia) Rodger Davis, (New Zealand) Frank Nobilo
12	31 Jan 1993	Heineken Classic	−13 (65-71-67-72=275)	3 strokes	(New Zealand) Michael Campbell
13	27 Feb 1994	Canon Challenge	−12 (68-67-72-69=276)	Playoff	(Australia) Chris Gray
14	19 Feb 1995	Australian Masters (2)	−12 (69-70-72-69=280)	1 stroke	(Australia) Wayne Grady, (Australia) Lucas Parsons, (United States) Tom Watson
15	25 Feb 1996	Canon Challenge (2)	−10 (70-72-67-69=278)	2 strokes	(Australia) Robert Allenby, (Australia) Brad King, (Australia) Robert Willis
16	1 Dec 1996	Greg Norman's Holden Classic	−7 (69-73-69-70=281)	1 stroke	(Australia) Greg Norman
17	23 Feb 1997	Canon Challenge (3)	−14 (68-70-66-70=274)	Playoff	(New Zealand) Steven Alker
18	14 Dec 2003	Australian PGA Championship (2)	−17 (64-65-69-73=271)	1 stroke	(Australia) Rod Pampling
19	13 Dec 2010	Australian PGA Championship^{1} (Note: incorporating the Queensland PGA Championship) (3)	−12 (70-67-68-71=276)	Playoff	(Australia) Geoff Ogilvy
20	9 Dec 2012	Emirates Australian Open^{1} (2)	−4 (75-68-69-72=284)	1 stroke	(Australia) Brendan Jones
21	22 Nov 2015	Uniqlo Masters (3)	−8 (70-70-68-68=276)	2 strokes	(United States) Bryson DeChambeau (a), (Australia) Andrew Evans, (Australia) John Senden

^{1}Co-sanctioned by the OneAsia Tour

PGA Tour of Australasia playoff record (5–1)

No.	Year	Tournament	Opponent	Result
1	1979	Dunhill South Australian Open	(Australia) Graham Stevens (a)	Won with birdie on first extra hole
2	1987	Queensland PGA Championship	(Australia) Jeff Woodland	Won with bogey on first extra hole
3	1993	Microsoft Australian Masters	(Australia) Bradley Hughes	Lost to par on first extra hole
4	1994	Canon Challenge	(Australia) Chris Gray	Won with birdie on first extra hole
5	1997	Canon Challenge	(New Zealand) Steven Alker	Won with birdie on fourth extra hole
6	2010	Australian PGA Championship	(Australia) Geoff Ogilvy	Won with par on second extra hole

=== Von Nida Tour wins (1) ===
No.	Date	Tournament	Winning score	Margin of victory	Runner-up
1	20 Jul 2003	Queensland Masters	−17 (67-67-70-67=271)	Playoff	(Australia) Paul Marantz

=== Other wins (3) ===
- 1985 Western Australia PGA Championship
- 1987 Victorian PGA Championship (Non-tour event)
- 1995 Australian Skins Game

=== European Senior Tour wins (1) ===
No.	Date	Tournament	Winning score	Margin of victory	Runner-up
1	21 Nov 2010 (2011 season)	Handa Australian Senior Open	−9 (65-70-72=207)	3 strokes	(Scotland) Sandy Lyle

=== PGA of Australia Legends Tour wins (35) ===
note: this list is probably incomplete

No.	Date	Tournament	Winning score	Margin of victory	Runner(s)-up
1	20 Dec 2009	Australian PGA Seniors Championship	−9 (72-63-72=207)	9 strokes	(Australia) Larry Canning, (Australia) Mike Harwood
2	21 Nov 2010	Handa Australian Senior Open	−9 (65-70-72=207)	3 strokes	(Scotland) Sandy Lyle
3	20 Dec 2013	Australian Legends Nor East Drinks Tour Championship			
4	15 Dec 2015	Noosa Legends Pro-Am			
5	21 Dec 2015	Sunshine Coast Masters			
6	3 Feb 2017	Shepparton BMW Victorian Senior Open			
7	23 Aug 2017	Ulton, Ken's Plumbing Plus & Lindsay Australia Bargara Legends Pro-Am			
8	16 Sep 2017	South Pacific Classic New Caledonia			
9	24 Oct 2017	Bermagui Legends Pro-Am			
10	1 Mar 2018	The Bruce Green Legends Pro-Am			
11	7 Mar 2018	Portsea Legends Pro-Am			
12	18 Jul 2018	Ulton, Ken's Plumbing Plus & Lindsay Australia Bargara Legends Pro-Am			
13	10 Aug 2018	Royal QLD Cup			
14	1 Feb 2019	Yarrawonga Mulwala Resort Victorian Senior Open			
15	5 Mar 2019	Legends on the Legends Pro-Am			
16	27 Apr 2019	Brookwater Legends Pro-Am			
17	12 Jul 2019	Tropical Auto Group Yeppoon Legends Pro-Am			
18	6 Aug 2019	Bartons / BMD QLD Senior PGA Championship (with (Australia) Richard Backwell)			
19	7 Aug 2019	Global Hire Rowes Bay Legends Pro-Am			
20	23 Aug 2019	Reside Retirement Living Pacific Legends Pro-Am (with two others)			
21	27 Aug 2019	Gold Coast Senior PGA Championship			
22	20 Sep 2019	Dumbea Legends Pro-Am			
23	2 Nov 2019	Australian PGA Seniors Championship (2)	−9 (69-67-65=201)	1 stroke	(Australia) Peter Fowler, (Australia) Peter O'Malley
24	31 Jan 2020	Furphy Victorian Open			
25	3 Aug 2020	onPlatinum RACV Royal Pines Legends Sweepstakes			
26	22 Jul 2021	Elgin Valley Beerwah Legends Pro-Am (with (Australia) Mike Harwood)			
27	26 Jul 2021	QLD PGA Senior Foursomes Championship (with (Australia) Gregory Rix)			
28	17 Dec 2021	Sunshine Coast Masters (with (Australia) Andre Stolz)			
29	17 Dec 2021	Sunshine Coast Series			
30	1 Apr 2022	Advent One Legends Pro-Am			
31	17 Jul 2022	Urangan Smash Repairs Fraser Coast Classic			
32	3 Sep 2022	PNG Senior Open			
33	31 Oct 2022	Moss Vale Legends Pro-Am			
34	20 May 2023	Vuksich & Borich Fiji Legends Golf Classic			
35	20 Jul 2025	Urangan Smash Repairs Fraser Coast Classic			

== Playoff record ==
Champions Tour playoff record (0–3)

No.	Year	Tournament	Opponent(s)	Result
1	2011	Songdo IBD Championship	(United States) Jay Don Blake, (United States) John Cook, (United States) Mark O'Meara	Blake won with birdie on fifth extra hole O'Meara and Senior eliminated by par on third hole
2	2011	Regions Tradition	(United States) Tom Lehman	Lost to par on second extra hole
3	2012	Allianz Championship	(United States) Corey Pavin	Lost to par on first extra hole

== Results in major championships ==
Tournament	1979	1980	1981	1982	1983	1984	1985	1986	1987	1988	1989
Masters Tournament											
U.S. Open											
The Open Championship	CUT					T14	T44	CUT	CUT	6	CUT
PGA Championship										T58	

Tournament	1990	1991	1992	1993	1994	1995	1996	1997	1998	1999
Masters Tournament	T42									
U.S. Open	CUT									
The Open Championship	CUT	T17	T25	T4	T20	T58	CUT	T51	CUT	
PGA Championship	62	CUT	T48	T51	T71	T44	CUT			

Tournament	2000	2001	2002	2003	2004	2005	2006	2007	2008	2009
Masters Tournament										
U.S. Open										
The Open Championship	T72									
PGA Championship										

Tournament	2010	2011	2012	2013
Masters Tournament				
U.S. Open				
The Open Championship	T60			T79
PGA Championship				

Top 10
Did not play

CUT = missed the half-way cut (3rd round cut in 1979 Open Championship)
"T" = tied

=== Summary ===
Tournament	Wins	2nd	3rd	Top-5	Top-10	Top-25	Events	Cuts made
Masters Tournament	0	0	0	0	0	0	1	1
U.S. Open	0	0	0	0	0	0	1	0
The Open Championship	0	0	0	1	2	6	19	12
PGA Championship	0	0	0	0	0	0	8	6
Totals	0	0	0	1	2	6	29	19

- Most consecutive cuts made – 8 (1992 Open Championship – 1995 PGA)
- Longest streak of top-10s – 1 (twice)

== Results in The Players Championship ==
Tournament	1991	1992	1993	1994
The Players Championship	CUT			CUT

Did not play

CUT = missed the halfway cut

== Results in World Golf Championships ==
Tournament	2000	2001	2002	2003	2004	2005	2006	2007	2008	2009	2010	2011
Match Play												
Championship	T42	NT^{1}			T43							T64
Invitational					T72							
Champions												

^{1}Cancelled due to 9/11

Did not play

"T" = Tied
NT = No tournament
Note that the HSBC Champions did not become a WGC event until 2009.

== Team appearances ==
Amateur

- Australian Men's Interstate Teams Matches (representing Queensland): 1976, 1977, 1978

Professional

- Dunhill Cup (representing Australia): 1987, 1993
- Four Tours World Championship (representing Australasia): 1987, 1988, 1989, 1990 (winners)
- World Cup (representing Australia): 1988, 1990
- Presidents Cup (International Team): 1994, 1996
- UBS Cup (representing the Rest of the World): 2004

== See also ==
- 1985 PGA Tour Qualifying School graduates
