= Gavin Coles =

Australian professional golfer

Personal information
- Nationality: Australia
- Born: 19 October 1968 (age 58) Bathurst, New South Wales, Australia
- Height: 5 ft 4 in (1.63 m)
- Weight: 155 lb (70 kg; 11.1 st)

Career
- Sport: Golf
- Turned professional: 1992
- Former tours: PGA Tour; PGA Tour of Australasia; Web.com Tour
- Professional wins: 5

Number of wins by tour
- PGA Tour of Australasia: 2
- Korn Ferry Tour: 5 (Tied-7th all-time)

Gavin Coles (born 19 October 1968) is an Australian professional golfer.

== Career ==
Coles is currently a member of the Nationwide Tour, where he has won 5 events; including two co-sanctioned events with the PGA Tour of Australasia. He was a member of the Nationwide Tour in 2002, 2004 and 2006 and the PGA Tour in 2003, 2005 and 2007.

== Professional wins (5) ==
=== PGA Tour of Australasia wins (2) ===
No.	Date	Tournament	Winning score	Margin of victory	Runner(s)-up
1	10 Mar 2002	Jacob's Creek Open Championship^{1}	−9 (71-69-67-72=279)	2 strokes	(United States) Bryce Molder
2	29 Feb 2004	New Zealand PGA Championship^{1}	−6 (70-72-72-68=282)	3 strokes	(Australia) Bradley Hughes, (Australia) Brendan Jones, (United States) Bill Lunde

^{1}Co-sanctioned by the Nationwide Tour

PGA Tour of Australasia playoff record (0–1)

No.	Year	Tournament	Opponents	Result
1	2002	MasterCard Masters	(Australia) Peter Lonard, (Australia) Adam Scott	Lonard won with par on third extra hole Scott eliminated by par on first hole

=== Nationwide Tour wins (5) ===
No.	Date	Tournament	Winning score	Margin of victory	Runner(s)-up
1	10 Mar 2002	Jacob's Creek Open Championship^{1}	−9 (71-69-67-72=279)	2 strokes	(United States) Bryce Molder
2	29 Feb 2004	New Zealand PGA Championship^{1}	−6 (70-72-72-68=282)	3 strokes	(Australia) Bradley Hughes, (Australia) Brendan Jones, (United States) Bill Lunde
3	3 Sep 2006	Legend Financial Group Classic	−10 (67-71-68-68=274)	1 stroke	(Australia) Bradley Hughes
4	30 Mar 2008	Chitimacha Louisiana Open	−12 (70-66-66-70=272)	1 stroke	(United States) Kyle Thompson
5	23 Oct 2011	Winn-Dixie Jacksonville Open	−6 (70-64-69-71=274)	1 stroke	(Sweden) Jonas Blixt

^{1}Co-sanctioned by the PGA Tour of Australasia

Nationwide Tour playoff record (0–1)

No.	Year	Tournament	Opponent	Result
1	2006	Peek'n Peak Classic	(United States) John Merrick	Lost to par on third extra hole

== Results in World Golf Championships ==
Tournament	2005
Match Play	
Championship	59
Invitational	

Did not play

== See also ==
- 2002 Buy.com Tour graduates
- 2004 Nationwide Tour graduates
- 2006 Nationwide Tour graduates
- 2011 Nationwide Tour graduates
- List of golfers with most Web.com Tour wins
