= Nathan Green (golfer) =

Australian professional golfer (born 1975)

Personal information
- Full name: Nathan Andrew Green
- Nationality: Australia
- Born: 13 May 1975 (age 51) Newcastle, New South Wales, Australia
- Height: 1.75 m (5 ft 9 in)
- Weight: 76 kg (168 lb; 12.0 st)

Career
- Sport: Golf
- Turned professional: 1998
- Current tour: PGA Tour of Australasia
- Former tours: PGA Tour; Canadian Tour; European Tour
- Professional wins: 4
- Highest ranking: 77 (7 January 2007)

Number of wins by tour
- PGA Tour: 1
- European Tour: 1
- PGA Tour of Australasia: 1
- Other: 2

Best results in major championships
- Masters Tournament: 48th: 2010
- PGA Championship: T23: 2007
- U.S. Open: CUT: 2006, 2007
- The Open Championship: CUT: 2001, 2011

Nathan Andrew Green (born 13 May 1975) is an Australian professional golfer.

== Career ==
In 1975, Green was born in Newcastle, New South Wales, Australia.

In 1998, Green turned professional. During his early career, he played mostly on the PGA Tour of Australasia and the Canadian Tour during the Australian winter. In 2000, he won the Queensland PGA Championship in Australia, and the Benefit Partners/NRCS Classic in Canada.

Having failed to gain his PGA Tour card through the qualifying school, Green competed on its developmental tour in 2002, 2004, and 2005. He ended the 2005 season 18th on the money list, which enabled him to graduate directly to the PGA Tour for 2006. He finished 5th in his first event on the PGA Tour, and in his second, the Buick Invitational, he made his way into a playoff for the title against Tiger Woods and José María Olazábal, but was eliminated at the first extra hole. He finished the year ranked inside the top 50 on the money list.

Green's victory at the New Zealand Open in December 2006 raised him into the top 100 of the Official World Golf Ranking for the first time.

Green's first PGA Tour victory came at the 2009 RBC Canadian Open where he defeated Retief Goosen on the second hole of a sudden-death playoff. Green almost lost on the first hole but Goosen missed a six-foot birdie putt that would have won the tournament. On the second hole, Green missed a twelve-foot birdie putt to win the tournament but it would not matter. Goosen had to sink a nine-foot par putt to extend the playoff but he missed it, giving Green the victory.

After Green's exemption expired, he earned his PGA Tour card through Q School, but only finished 163rd on the 2012 money list. He split the 2013 season between the PGA Tour and Web.com Tour. Green has not played a PGA Tour-sanctioned event since 2015, instead choosing to compete on the PGA Tour of Australasia.

== Amateur wins ==
- 1996 New South Wales Medal, (tied with Scott Gardiner and Brendan Jones)

== Professional wins (4) ==
=== PGA Tour wins (1) ===
No.	Date	Tournament	Winning score	Margin of victory	Runner-up
1	27 Jul 2009	RBC Canadian Open	−18 (68-65-69-68=270)	Playoff	(South Africa) Retief Goosen

PGA Tour playoff record (1–1)

No.	Year	Tournament	Opponent(s)	Result
1	2006	Buick Invitational	(Spain) José María Olazábal, (United States) Tiger Woods	Woods won with par on second extra hole Green eliminated by par on first hole
2	2009	RBC Canadian Open	(South Africa) Retief Goosen	Won with par on second extra hole

=== European Tour wins (1) ===
No.	Date	Tournament	Winning score	Margin of victory	Runners-up
1	3 Dec 2006 (2007 season)	Blue Chip New Zealand Open^{1}	−5 (71-67-76-65=279)	2 strokes	(New Zealand) Michael Campbell, (England) Nick Dougherty, (Australia) Marcus Fraser, (Australia) Jarrod Moseley, (Australia) Wade Ormsby, (Australia) Brett Rumford

^{1}Co-sanctioned by the PGA Tour of Australasia

=== PGA Tour of Australasia wins (1) ===
No.	Date	Tournament	Winning score	Margin of victory	Runners-up
1	3 Dec 2006	Blue Chip New Zealand Open^{1}	−5 (71-67-76-65=279)	2 strokes	(New Zealand) Michael Campbell, (England) Nick Dougherty, (Australia) Marcus Fraser, (Australia) Jarrod Moseley, (Australia) Wade Ormsby, (Australia) Brett Rumford

^{1}Co-sanctioned by the European Tour

=== Canadian Tour wins (1) ===
No.	Date	Tournament	Winning score	Margin of victory	Runners-up
1	6 Aug 2000	Benefit Partners/NRCS Classic	−7 (67-74-68-72=281)	3 strokes	(United States) Doug LaBelle II, (United States) Grant Masson

=== Other wins (1) ===
- 2000 Queensland PGA Championship (Development Tour)

== Results in major championships ==
Tournament	2001	2002	2003	2004	2005	2006	2007	2008	2009	2010	2011
Masters Tournament										48	
U.S. Open						CUT	CUT				
The Open Championship	CUT										CUT
PGA Championship						T49	T23		T63		

Did not play

CUT = missed the half-way cut
"T" = tied

== Results in The Players Championship ==
Tournament	2006	2007	2008	2009	2010
The Players Championship	T66	T16	CUT	T71	CUT

CUT = missed the halfway cut
"T" indicates a tie for a place

== Results in World Golf Championships ==
Tournament	2007	2008	2009
Match Play			
Championship	T58		
Invitational			T64
Champions			T62

Did not play

"T" = Tied
Note that the HSBC Champions did not become a WGC event until 2009.

== Team appearances ==
Amateur

- Australian Men's Interstate Teams Matches (representing New South Wales): 1995 (winners), 1996 (winners), 1997, 1998 (winners)

Professional

- World Cup (representing Australia): 2007

== See also ==
- 2005 Nationwide Tour graduates
- 2011 PGA Tour Qualifying School graduates
