= 2002 PGA Tour of Australasia =

Golf tour season

2002 PGA Tour of Australasia season
- Duration: 15 November 2001 – 8 December 2002
- Number of official events: 21
- Most wins: (Australia) Peter Lonard (2) (Australia) Terry Price (2) (Australia) Andre Stolz (2)
- Order of Merit: (Australia) Craig Parry

The 2002 PGA Tour of Australasia was the 30th season on the PGA Tour of Australasia, the main professional golf tour in Australia and New Zealand since it was formed in 1973.

== Schedule ==
The following table lists official events during the 2002 season.

Date	Tournament	Location	Purse (A$)	Winner (Note: The number in brackets after each winner's name is the number of PGA Tour of Australasia events they had won up to and including that tournament. This information is only shown for PGA Tour of Australasia members.)	OWGR points	Other tours (Note: ASA − Asian PGA Tour; BUY − Buy.com Tour; EUR − European Tour.)	Notes
18 Nov	Australian PGA Championship	Queensland	1,000,000	(Australia) Robert Allenby (7)	16		
25 Nov	Holden Australian Open	Queensland	1,500,000	(Australia) Stuart Appleby (2)	32		Flagship event
13 Jan	TelstraSaturn Hyundai New Zealand Open	New Zealand	NZ$1,000,000	(Australia) Craig Parry (10)	24		
27 Jan	Johnnie Walker Classic	Western Australia	£1,000,000	(South Africa) Retief Goosen (n/a)	42	ASA, EUR	
3 Feb	Heineken Classic	Victoria	2,000,000	(South Africa) Ernie Els (n/a)	36	EUR	
10 Feb	ANZ Championship	New South Wales	1,750,000	(Sweden) Richard S. Johnson (n/a)	20	EUR	
3 Mar	NSW Masters	New South Wales	100,000	(Australia) Steve Collins (1)	16		New tournament
10 Mar	Jacob's Creek Open Championship	South Australia	US$500,000	(Australia) Gavin Coles (1)	12	BUY	
17 Mar	Holden Clearwater Classic	New Zealand	US$500,000	(Australia) Peter O'Malley (3)	12	BUY	
24 Mar	Scenic Circle Hotels Dunedin Classic	New Zealand	100,000	(New Zealand) Gareth Paddison (1)	16		
7 Apr	Volvo Trucks Golf Klassik	New South Wales	100,000	(Australia) Terry Price (3)	16		New tournament
28 Apr	Schweppes SA PGA Championship	South Australia	100,000	(Australia) Richard Ball (1)	16		
26 May	Western Australia PGA Championship	Western Australia	100,000	(Australia) Kim Felton (1)	16		
16 Jun	Queensland PGA Championship	Queensland	100,000	(Australia) Andre Stolz (2)	16		
13 Oct	Victorian PGA Championship	Victoria	100,000	(Australia) Craig Carmichael (1)	16		
27 Oct	ANZ Victorian Open Championship	Victoria	100,000	(Australia) Andre Stolz (2)	16		
3 Nov	Queensland Open	Queensland	100,000	(Australia) Andrew Buckle (1)	16		
10 Nov	New South Wales Open	New South Wales	200,000	(Australia) Terry Price (4)	16		
24 Nov	Holden Australian Open	Victoria	1,500,000	(Australia) Stephen Allan (1)	32		Flagship event
1 Dec	Australian PGA Championship	Western Australia	1,000,000	(Australia) Peter Lonard (4) (Australia) Jarrod Moseley (2)	13		Title shared (Note: Lonard and Moseley remained tied after one hole of a sudden-death playoff before darkness fell.)
8 Dec	MasterCard Masters	Victoria	1,250,000	(Australia) Peter Lonard (5)	20		

== Order of Merit ==
The Order of Merit was based on prize money won during the season, calculated in Australian dollars.

Position	Player	Prize money (A$)
1	(Australia) Craig Parry	641,789
2	(Australia) Peter Lonard	497,256
3	(Australia) Peter O'Malley	423,305
4	(Australia) Scott Laycock	401,219
5	(Australia) Gavin Coles	395,069
