= Robert Allenby =

Australian professional golfer (born 1971)

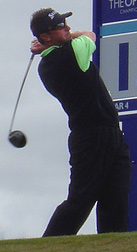
- Allenby in 2004

Personal information
- Nationality: Australia
- Born: 12 July 1971 (age 55) Melbourne, Australia
- Height: 6 ft 1 in (1.85 m)
- Weight: 185 lb (84 kg; 13.2 st)

Career
- Sport: Golf
- College: None
- Turned professional: 1991
- Current tour: PGA Tour Champions
- Former tours: European Tour; PGA Tour of Australasia; PGA Tour; Korn Ferry Tour
- Professional wins: 22
- Highest ranking: 12 (9 May 2010)

Number of wins by tour
- PGA Tour: 4
- European Tour: 4
- Sunshine Tour: 1
- PGA Tour of Australasia: 12
- Other: 1

Best results in major championships
- Masters Tournament: T22: 2006
- PGA Championship: T9: 2004
- U.S. Open: T7: 2004
- The Open Championship: T7: 2008

Achievements and awards
- PGA Tour of Australasia Order of Merit winner: 1992, 1994
- PGA Tour of Australasia Player of the Year: 1992
- PGA Tour of Australasia Rookie of the Year: 1992

Robert Allenby (born 12 July 1971) is an Australian professional golfer.

== Early life ==
Allenby was born in Melbourne on 12 July 1971. He is of English descent, with his father being a native of Leeds.

== Professional career ==
He turned professional in 1992 and was successful almost immediately, topping the PGA Tour of Australasia Order of Merit in his first season and again in 1994. He continues to play some events on his home tour and has won 13 times in Australasia, including the Victorian Open as an amateur. He also began to play on the European Tour and it was his principal tour until 1998. He won four tournaments on it, including three in 1996, when he finished third on the Order of Merit. He has featured in the top 20 of the Official World Golf Rankings.

Allenby now plays primarily in the U.S. on the PGA Tour. He earned exempt status for 1999 by finishing 17th at the 1998 Qualifying School. He had a disappointing first season in America, coming 126th on the money list, but came good in 2000 when he won the Shell Houston Open and the Advil Western Open. He claimed another pair of wins the following season. In both of those years he came 16th on the money list. He has not won since but finished in the top 50 each year from 2002 to 2004. His performances in the major championships have been somewhat disappointing; his highest placing in a major is tied seventh at the 2004 U.S. Open. In 2005 he became the first golfer to win the "triple crown" of the Australian Masters, Australian PGA and Australian Open in the same year.

Allenby played for the International Team in the Presidents Cup in 1994, 1996, 2000, 2003 and 2009. After posting a 2–2–1 record in the 2009 Presidents Cup, Allenby accused Anthony Kim of being ill-prepared for his Sunday singles match, in which Allenby lost 5 and 3. In December 2009 Allenby became the first Australian to win the Nedbank Golf Challenge in South Africa, defeating Henrik Stenson in a playoff. It was his first professional win in four years, but he did not have to wait long for the next as he returned home to claim his fourth Australian PGA Championship title the following week.

Allenby missed the cut in the 2011 Masters Tournament by one stroke after bogeying the 18th hole of the second round. In February 2012, Allenby missed an opportunity to end an eleven-year drought on the PGA Tour, when he took a two stroke advantage to the 72nd hole of the Mayakoba Golf Classic. He hit his tee shot into the trees on the right and proceeded to make double bogey to fall into a playoff with rookie John Huh. He lost out at the eighth extra hole when he could only bogey the par three 10th, leaving Huh with a tap in par for the tournament. Both players had made par on all seven previous holes throughout the playoff until this point.

== Controversies ==
Allenby fractured his sternum and suffered facial injuries when he was involved in a car accident when the vehicle he was driving struck an obstacle on a roundabout in Puerto Banús in September 1996. The incident occurred after he was forced to withdraw from the 1996 European Open tournament after suffering a foot injury during the Loch Lomond World Invitational the previous weekend.

Statements made by Allenby at the 2009 and 2011 Presidents Cups generated controversy. In 2009, following a loss to American Anthony Kim in the Sunday singles, Allenby accused Kim of partying all night on the eve of the Singles matches. That statement was vehemently denied by Kim and the members of the American team. In 2011, following a 0–4–0 record at the Presidents Cup where he failed to gain any points for the International team, he asserted that his record wasn't completely his fault and cited his partners' poor play as a reason. His partners, including Geoff Ogilvy, were displeased with Allenby's comments. The following week, at the Australian PGA Championship, Allenby got into contention which resulted in Ogilvy making a tweet that Allenby perceived as being sarcastic. After the tournament ended, Allenby exchanged heated words with Ogilvy and came close to having a physical altercation with Ogilvy.

In July 2015 at the RBC Canadian Open, Allenby had a verbal altercation with his caddie, Mick Middlemo, after playing four holes. While Allenby says that he was verbally abused and threatened by Middlemo, Middlemo says Allenby was verbally abusive. Middlemo walked off the course and Allenby selected a school principal from the gallery to carry his clubs the rest of the round. Later reports from another caddy in the group, Simon Clarke, seemed to indicate the problem was with Allenby. Clarke said, "I've known Rob for a long time and I've known Mick for a long time. It's disappointing that at age 42, or however old he [Allenby] is, he's still treating people that way and how many good caddies he's gone through."

== Personal life ==
Allenby resides in Jupiter, Florida.

Allenby is a patron of the Challenge Cancer Support Network, which has raised more than AU$9 million since 1993 for children with cancer and blood disorders. On 22 June 2000, he was awarded the Australian Sports Medal.

Allenby said he was kidnapped while drinking at a bar in Honolulu on 17 January 2015, with his kidnappers robbing and beating him before leaving him in a park several miles away. An arrest was made concerning the false use of his credit card when it was used to spend US$32,000 at a strip club, which was filed as a case of mistaken identity.

== Amateur wins ==
- 1989 (1) Australian Juniors Amateur Championship
- 1990 (2) Victorian Amateur Championship, Riversdale Cup
- 1991 (1) Riversdale Cup

== Professional wins (22) ==
=== PGA Tour wins (4) ===
No.	Date	Tournament	Winning score	Margin of victory	Runner(s)-up
1	30 Apr 2000	Shell Houston Open	−13 (68-67-68-72=275)	Playoff	(United States) Craig Stadler
2	9 Jul 2000	Advil Western Open	−14 (69-69-68-68=274)	Playoff	(Zimbabwe) Nick Price
3	25 Feb 2001	Nissan Open	−8 (73-64-69-70=276)	Playoff	(United States) Brandel Chamblee, (Japan) Toshimitsu Izawa, (United States) Dennis Paulson, (United States) Jeff Sluman, (United States) Bob Tway
4	23 Sep 2001	Marconi Pennsylvania Classic	−19 (70-65-66-68=269)	3 strokes	(United States) Larry Mize, (United States) Rocco Mediate

PGA Tour playoff record (3–2)

No.	Year	Tournament	Opponent(s)	Result
1	2000	Shell Houston Open	(United States) Craig Stadler	Won with par on fourth extra hole
2	2000	Advil Western Open	(Zimbabwe) Nick Price	Won with par on first extra hole
3	2001	Nissan Open	(United States) Brandel Chamblee, (Japan) Toshimitsu Izawa, (United States) Dennis Paulson, (United States) Jeff Sluman, (United States) Bob Tway	Won with birdie on first extra hole
4	2008	Stanford St. Jude Championship	(South Africa) Trevor Immelman, (United States) Justin Leonard	Leonard won with birdie on second extra hole
5	2012	Mayakoba Golf Classic	(United States) John Huh	Lost to par on eighth extra hole

=== European Tour wins (4) ===
No.	Date	Tournament	Winning score	Margin of victory	Runner(s)-up
1	12 Jun 1994	Honda Open	−12 (72-67-68-69=276)	Playoff	(Spain) Miguel Ángel Jiménez
2	9 Jun 1996	Alamo English Open	−10 (69-71-69-69=278)	1 stroke	(England) Ross McFarlane, (Scotland) Colin Montgomerie
3	30 Jun 1996	Peugeot Open de France	−16 (70-65-68-69=272)	Playoff	(Germany) Bernhard Langer
4	31 Aug 1996	One 2 One British Masters	−4 (69-71-71-73=284)	Playoff	(Spain) Miguel Ángel Martín

European Tour playoff record (3–0)

No.	Year	Tournament	Opponent	Result
1	1994	Honda Open	(Spain) Miguel Ángel Jiménez	Won with par on third extra hole
2	1996	Peugeot Open de France	(Germany) Bernhard Langer	Won with birdie on first extra hole
3	1996	One 2 One British Masters	(Spain) Miguel Ángel Martín	Won after concession on first extra hole

=== Sunshine Tour wins (1) ===
No.	Date	Tournament	Winning score	Margin of victory	Runner-up
1	6 Dec 2009	Nedbank Golf Challenge	−11 (68-70-68-71=277)	Playoff	(Sweden) Henrik Stenson

Sunshine Tour playoff record (1–0)

No.	Year	Tournament	Opponent	Result
1	2009	Nedbank Golf Challenge	(Sweden) Henrik Stenson	Won with par on third extra hole

=== PGA Tour of Australasia wins (12) ===
Legend
Flagship events (2)
Other PGA Tour of Australasia (10)

No.	Date	Tournament	Winning score	Margin of victory	Runner(s)-up
1	18 Oct 1992	Perak Masters	−13 (66-70-68-71=275)	2 strokes	(Australia) Stuart Bouvier, (Malaysia) Marimuthu Ramayah
2	6 Dec 1992	Johnnie Walker Australian Classic	−13 (66-68-69-72=275)	5 strokes	(Australia) Peter Senior
3	24 Jan 1993	Optus Players Championship	−14 (71-66-69-68=274)	Playoff	(Australia) Wayne Grady
4	27 Nov 1994	Heineken Australian Open	−8 (70-70-70-70=280)	1 stroke	(Australia) Brett Ogle
5	5 Feb 1995	Heineken Classic	−10 (73-66-67-72=278)	1 stroke	(Australia) Wayne Smith
6	3 Dec 2000	Australian PGA Championship	−13 (69-64-72-70=275)	1 stroke	(Australia) Steven Conran
7	18 Nov 2001 (2002 season)	Australian PGA Championship (2)	−15 (65-69-70-69=273)	1 stroke	(Australia) Geoff Ogilvy
8	7 Dec 2003	MasterCard Masters	−11 (67-67-72-71=277)	Playoff	(Australia) Jarrod Moseley, (Australia) Craig Parry, (Australia) Adam Scott
9	27 Nov 2005	Australian Open (2)	−4 (63-72-72-77=284)	1 stroke	(Australia) Nick O'Hern, (Australia) John Senden, (Australia) Paul Sheehan
10	4 Dec 2005	Cadbury Schweppes Centenary Australian PGA Championship (3)	−18 (68-71-64-67=270)	1 stroke	(Australia) Mathew Goggin
11	11 Dec 2005	MasterCard Masters (2)	−17 (67-68-68-68=271)	Playoff	(United States) Bubba Watson
12	13 Dec 2009	Australian PGA Championship^{1} (4)	−14 (70-68-66-66=270)	4 strokes	(Australia) John Senden, (Australia) Scott Strange

^{1}Co-sanctioned by the OneAsia Tour

PGA Tour of Australasia playoff record (3–1)

No.	Year	Tournament	Opponent(s)	Result
1	1993	Optus Players Championship	(Australia) Wayne Grady	Won with birdie on first extra hole
2	2003	MasterCard Masters	(Australia) Jarrod Moseley, (Australia) Craig Parry, (Australia) Adam Scott	Won with birdie on second extra hole Moseley and Parry eliminated by birdie on first hole
3	2005	MasterCard Masters	(United States) Bubba Watson	Won with par on first extra hole
4	2011	Australian PGA Championship	(Australia) Greg Chalmers, (Australia) Marcus Fraser	Chalmers won with par on first extra hole

=== Other wins (1) ===
No.	Date	Tournament	Winning score	Margin of victory	Runners-up
1	3 Nov 1991	Victorian Open (as an amateur)	−1 (76-70-66-75=287)	6 strokes	(Australia) David Armstrong, (Australia) Paul Moloney

== Results in major championships ==
Tournament	1991	1992	1993	1994	1995	1996	1997	1998	1999
Masters Tournament							CUT		
U.S. Open			T33				CUT		T46
The Open Championship	CUT		CUT	T60	T15	T56	T10	T19	
PGA Championship			CUT		CUT	CUT	T49	T13	CUT

Tournament	2000	2001	2002	2003	2004	2005	2006	2007	2008	2009
Masters Tournament		47	T29	T39	CUT	CUT	T22	CUT	T42	T38
U.S. Open		CUT	T12	CUT	T7	CUT	T16	CUT	T18	CUT
The Open Championship	T36	T47	CUT	T43	CUT	T52	T16	CUT	T7	T52
PGA Championship	T19	T16	T10	T39	T9	CUT	T20	CUT	T31	T24

Tournament	2010	2011	2012	2013	2014
Masters Tournament	T45	CUT			
U.S. Open	T29	CUT			CUT
The Open Championship	T27	T48	CUT		
PGA Championship		T26	CUT		

Top 10
Did not play

CUT = missed the half-way cut
"T" = tied

=== Summary ===
Tournament	Wins	2nd	3rd	Top-5	Top-10	Top-25	Events	Cuts made
Masters Tournament	0	0	0	0	0	1	12	7
U.S. Open	0	0	0	0	1	4	15	7
The Open Championship	0	0	0	0	2	5	20	14
PGA Championship	0	0	0	0	2	7	18	11
Totals	0	0	0	0	5	17	65	39

- Most consecutive cuts made – 7 (2000 Open Championship – 2002 U.S. Open)
- Longest streak of top-10s – 1 (five times)

== Results in The Players Championship ==
Tournament	1995	1996	1997	1998	1999
The Players Championship	73	CUT	CUT		

Tournament	2000	2001	2002	2003	2004	2005	2006	2007	2008	2009
The Players Championship	T53	T21	T11	T4	T33	CUT	T38	CUT	T42	T14

Tournament	2010	2011	2012	2013	2014	2015
The Players Championship	2	T50	T61	CUT		T56

Top 10
Did not play

CUT = missed the halfway cut
"T" indicates a tie for a place

== Results in World Golf Championships ==
Tournament	2000	2001	2002	2003	2004	2005	2006	2007	2008	2009	2010	2011	2012
Match Play		R32	R64	R16	R32	QF	R32	R64	R64	R64	R32	R64	
Championship	T25	NT^{1}	T31	T21	T54		T26	T3	T20	T28	T11	T15	
Invitational	T12	T23	T2	T6	T9		T22	81	T20	T2		T48	69
Champions										T23	T21		T56

^{1}Cancelled due to 9/11

Top 10
Did not play

QF, R16, R32, R64 = Round in which player lost in match play
"T" = tied
NT = No Tournament
Note that the HSBC Champions did not become a WGC event until 2009.

== Results in senior major championships ==
Tournament	2021	2022
The Tradition	–	62
Senior PGA Championship	–	CUT
U.S. Senior Open	–	CUT
Senior Players Championship	–	76
The Senior Open Championship	T64	CUT

Did not play

CUT = missed the halfway cut
"T" indicates a tie for a place

== Team appearances ==
Amateur

- Eisenhower Trophy (representing Australia): 1990
- Nomura Cup (representing Australia): 1991 (winners)
- Sloan Morpeth Trophy (representing Australia): 1990 (winners), 1991 (winners)
- Australian Men's Interstate Teams Matches (representing Victoria): 1989, 1990, 1991

Professional

- World Cup (representing Australia): 1993, 1995, 2009
- Dunhill Cup (representing Australia): 1994, 1997
- Presidents Cup (International Team): 1994, 1996, 2000, 2003 (tie), 2009, 2011
- Alfred Dunhill Challenge (representing Australasia): 1995

== See also ==
- 1998 PGA Tour Qualifying School graduates
