= Murray Crafter =

Australian professional golfer (1930–2017

Personal information
- Full name: Murray Richard Crafter
- Nationality: Australia
- Born: December 1930 Adelaide, Australia
- Died: 3 January 2017 (aged 86)
- Spouse: Sheila
- Children: 4

Career
- Sport: Golf
- Turned professional: 1946
- Professional wins: 28

Achievements and awards
- South Australian Golf Hall of Fame: 2011
- Glenegl Hall of Fame: 2011

Murray Richard Crafter (c. December 1930 − 3 January 2017) was an Australian professional golfer. In his mid-teens, Crafter turned professional and quickly got a job at Glenelg Golf Club. This was the beginning of a long relationship with Glenelg where he worked for several decades. In his free time, Crafter also played a number of significant tournaments, winning the South Australian PGA Championship eleven times and the South Australian Open six times. In 1960, Crafter travelled overseas to play in Europe where he had much success, posting a number of top tens in national opens. However he elected to not play in the continent again, returning to Australia where he worked as a club pro and golf course architect for the remainder of his career. In his spare time he still played significant events, notably winning the 1966 West End Tournament, sharing the title with Kel Nagle.

== Early life ==
In 1930, Crafter was born in Adelaide, South Australia. At the age of 10, Crafter began his career in the golf industry as a caddy at Kooyonga Golf Club. As a schoolchild, Crafter adhered to a diligent practice schedule. He would often wake up at 4:30am so he could play a full round of golf before school.

He was the older brother to Brian Crafter, a future professional golfer.

== Professional career ==
By the age of 15, Crafter had turned professional. He worked as an assistant at Kooyonga Golf Club. He was an apprentice to Rufus Stewart. He worked with Stewart for a year. His "next appointment" was at Glenelg Golf Club.

In his late teens, Crafter began receiving attention for his play in some minor South Australian events. In 1948, he was the "leading assistant" at South Australia's edition of the Dunlop Cup. Two years later, in July 1950, Crafter was the low professional at the Patron's Cup, a purse event at Glenelg. A couple months later, in October, he finished runner-up at the Dunlop Cup. Days later, he played the two-round Slazenger Cup. In the first round, he shot a 73 to put him in second place, two behind Bruce Auld. In the afternoon, playing against a "strong wind," Crafter produced another "great round" of 71 to defeat Auld by one. During this era, he received praise from legendary Welsh golfer Dai Rees. "I was impressed with the performance of Glenelg's young assistant professional, Murray Crafter," he said after a tournament they played together.

Soon thereafter, Crafter was receiving praise for his performance in more significant South Australian events. In November 1950, he played the South Australian PGA Championship. At the two-round semifinals, he played Royal Adelaide club pro Willie Harvey. Crafter was behind entering the afternoon's final nine but won a number of holes early on the back nine. He ultimately was victorious, 2 & 1. In the finals, again 36 holes, he played Gordon Westthorp, a professional out of The Grange. Crafter opened well, taking a three up lead after 5 holes. He led 4 up at the midway point. Crafter maintained good play in the afternoon round, ultimately recording eight consecutive one-putt greens. He won 5 & 4. At 20 years old, he was the youngest champion of the event. Days later, Crafter played the Penfold Purse at The Grange. He shot a 72 to finish joint third, only behind his brother, Brian Crafter, and the champion Bruce Auld, three back. In March 1951, Crafter played the four-round Adelaide Advertiser Tournament held at Kooyonga Golf Club. Crafter opened with rounds of 73 to put him in joint third at the midway point only behind leader Eric Cremin and Ossie Pickworth. According to The Advertiser, "it was his best showing in competitive golf" up to that point in his career. Crafter finished poorly with rounds of 76 and 82 but still finished in the top ten. Despite the weak close, Crafter received praise. Cremin, the champion of the event, was so impressed with his talent that he suggested that Crafter immediately begin looking for senior assistant club jobs in Sydney, New South Wales. At the conclusion of the tournament, Frank Besemeres of The News stated that he "and his 19-year-old brother Brian are regarded by interstate golfing stars as two of the most promising juniors in Australia."

Through 1951, Crafter continued with success at South Australian events, both minor and significant. In May, he played South Australia's edition of the Dunlop Cup again. The two-round tournament was held at Glenelg Golf Club. Crafter opened with a "brilliant" one-under-par 71 to take the lead. Despite shaky play around the greens, leading to a second round 78, he still won easily, defeating Fred Thomson by three. In July, he played the Patron's Cup, also held at Glenelg, once again. He closed with a 71, including a "breath-taking" 33 on the final nine, to finish solo third. In October, he played the South Australian PGA Championship as defending champion. At the qualifier he finished in second place, only behind his brother, Brian Crafter. He was scheduled to play Willie Harvey in the semifinals. In the middle of the semifinals, on the 11th hole, Harvey abruptly collapsed and died. He had a heart attack. Organizers thought about cancelling the event. However, they decided it would resume, delayed by a week. The semifinal match was conceded to Crafter. In the finals, played over 36 holes, he would play his brother. In the morning round, his brother took a 1 up lead. However, beginning on the 11th hole, Crafter went on a "devastating run," winning six of the final eight holes on the homeward half to take a 5 up lead. In the afternoon, a birdie on the par-4 13th hole assured a 6 & 5 win. According to The News, in the early 1950s he was "the state's top professional."

In January 1952, Crafter was appointed assistant professional at Wynnum Club in Brisbane, Queensland. In early February, he began work. In his free time, he played a number of significant events in Queensland. In mid-February, he committed to the McWilliam's Wines Tournament. He would be playing against a competitive, "world-wide field." Playing against 163 competitors, Crafter recorded five birdies for an opening round 71 (−1). He was "right with the leaders," in sixth place, three back of the lead held by Peter Thomson and Ossie Pickworth. He followed with rounds of 78 and 79 to fall out of contention though. In early May, he played the two-round Queensland Close Championship at Toowoomba Golf Links. Crafter opened with a 68 and "seemed set for a good win," taking a sizable lead. However, late in the final round, on the par-3 16th hole, he recorded a 7. He lost to Jack Coogan by one. Later in the month he recorded another runner-up finish, finishing joint second at the two-round Yeerongpilly Cup. Days later, on May 27, he played the Wynnum purse at his home club. He shot a 69 to finish joint third, seven shots behind champion Ossie Pickworth. In October, he played a number of two-round "Trading House" purses. Late in the month he played the two-round Spalding 100£ purse. Crafter opened with a 73 to put him one shot back. In the second round, he shot a 69, "five under scratch," to finish at 142. He won the event. The following day he played the Dunlop 100£ purse. He scored 72 in each round to finish joint fourth, five back of champion Reg Want. Days later he finished joint third at the two-round Slazenger 100£ purse. According to the Brisbane Telegraph, the consensus was that Crafter "featured well" in the purse events. In November, he played the Queensland PGA Championship. The Telegraph stated that Crafter "should be the most serious threat" to Reg Want, the defending champion. At the qualifier, Crafter finished joint second, two behind Want. Crafter won his first two matches. In the finals, he did indeed face Reg Want. Crafter was 4 down entering the 27th hole but "fought back magnificently." He won three holes on the back nine to reduce Want's lead to 1 up entering the 35th hole. However, Crafter missed a 3-foot putt on the 17th green to abruptly lose. He lost 2 & 1.

Despite the good play in Queensland, Crafter returned to South Australia in the middle of 1953. He got a job as an assistant pro at Kooyonga Golf Club. In August, he played the South Australian Open held at Kooyonga. He finished solo fourth and was also the low professional. In November, he played the South Australian PGA Championship. He reached the finals where he played Fred Thomson. "Windy conditions" made it difficult for any player to create separation for most of the morning round. However, "a brave finish" by Crafter, where he won the final three holes of the morning, gave him a 4 up lead at lunch. Both players won a number of holes on the afternoon's front nine and Crafter maintained a 4 up lead at the turn. However, Crafter "did not win another hole" thereafter. Starting at the 32nd hole, Thomson won four straight holes to take a 1 up lead entering the last. On the final hole, Thomson hit a chip shot within inches to assure the win. He won 2 up. Shortly thereafter, Crafter decided to retire as a golfer. He decided to work in the fruit business. He thought this industry was more financially rewarding.

However, Crafter returned to the golf industry in the middle of 1954. He got a job as a club professional at Glenelg Golf Club. In October, he played the South Australian PGA Championship again. At the two-round qualifier, Crafter finished joint medalist with Bruce Auld. In the semifinals, he played Jim Mills, a pro playing out of Kooyonga. They "battled" back and forth but Crafter "took the honors on the last green," 1 up. In the finals he played Bruce Auld. Auld held a 2 up at lunch. In the afternoon match, Crafter won a number of holes, briefly tying Auld but could never gain the lead. Auld won, 1 up. However, Crafter won the event the following two years. In addition, in 1956 he shared the title for the inaugural Grange Open with George Cussell. In April 1957, he played the Adelaide Advertiser Tournament. At the midway point he was at 139, holding a three shot lead over Ossie Pickworth and a five shot lead over Kel Nagle. Crafter, though, shot a 74 in the third round and the field was closing on him early in the final round. However, Crafter scored a hole-in-one at the par-3 7th hole to expand his lead. He ultimately shot a 69 to defeat Syd Cowling by four and Nagle by five. In the middle of the year, he won the South Australian Open for the first time. In October, he played the Victor Harbour Open. Crafter opened with a 69 to break Gary Player's course record and take the lead. He shot a 72 in the final round but was overtaken by Bob Tuohy's "sensational" 66. He lost to Tuohy by one. Because Tuohy was an amateur, however, Crafter won the 50£ professional purse. Crafter also won the best-ball tournament with amateur Arnold Brown. In addition, Crafter won the Grange Open again, sharing the title with Dick Foot. According to the Victor Harbor Times, Crafter "has dominated professional golf in S.A. during the last few years."

Around this time, Crafter began playing some significant national events. In November 1957, he played the Pelaco Tournament at Victoria Golf Club in Melbourne, Victoria. He finished in joint 13th place. The following week he played the Australian Open, also in Melbourne. In the second round, he shot an opening 33, challenging Kel Nagle and Gary Player for the lead. However, he scored a 6 on the 14th hole and a 7 on the 18th hole to fall back. He still finished the tournament in the top ten. In April 1958, he played the Adelaide Advertiser Tournament again, a significant event in his home state. He opened with rounds of 69 and 70 to hold joint second place, five behind leader Nagle. Nagle, meanwhile, "slipped over the last two rounds." Crafter put up a "severe challenge" to Nagle over the final day, with rounds of 71 and 70, but it was not enough. At 279, Nagle defeated him by one. A year later, Crafter played the tournament again. He was again behind Nagle during the final round but once again played well on the final day. Crafter picked up three shots on the front nine and then tied Nagle with a birdie on the 13th hole. He eagled the 15th hole to take the lead. He then birdied the next two holes to secure the title. With a final round 66, Crafter finished with a 279 aggregate to defeat Nagle by two. Crafter's win received international media attention and was widely reported across the United States by The Associated Press.

In May 1960, Crafter travelled to Europe to play on the British PGA circuit and continental events. He was financially sponsored by a group of members at Glenelg Golf Club, his home club. His first tournament was the four-round Swallows and Penfold Tournament. At the Penfold tournament, Crafter had one of the earlier tee times and his 69 put him one back of the clubhouse lead held by Henry Cotton. In the second round, he shot another 69 to tie Peter Thomson for the low Australian overall. He finished in joint 15th place. In July, he began the qualifying process for the 1960 Open Championship. In the first qualifying round, held at St. Andrews Golf Club, Crafter went out early and shot a 72. He had a chance to tie the course record but his 20-foot birdie putt on the last just missed. The Canberra Times reported that he "should qualify without much trouble." Though he shot a 76 in the second qualifying round, he did qualify for the tournament proper. A week later he played the French Open at St. Cloud Golf Club. Crafter shot a final round 63 (−9) to break the course record. He finished solo sixth. Days later, he finished fourth at the Dutch Open. In late July, he recorded another top ten, this time at the German Open.

Crafter returned to Australia where he continued with success in the early 1960s, winning a number of tournaments. In November 1960, he won the South Australian PGA Championship again, defeating John Sullivan 6 & 5 in the finals. In 1962, he won the South Australian Open and successfully repeated as champion. In June 1963, he played the Central Australian tournament at Alice Springs, Northern Territory. Crafter won the event, defeating Bobby Brown. In October, he won the Victor Harbour Open again, shooting rounds of 67 and 68, defeating John Sullivan by three. Days later, he began play at the Angove-Renmark 500£ golf tournament. He opened with a three-under-par 71 to put him one off the lead held by Peter Thomson, Bobby Brown, and Ron Howell. He then shot a final round 67 (−7) to take the clubhouse lead. Brown and Thomson still had chances to tie him though. Brown "dropped a 12-foot putt for a birdie at the last hole to tie." Thomson, however, missed his birdie putt. Crafter shared the win with Brown.

In 1964, Crafter had "his leanest year in top professional golf," however. He recorded a top ten finish at the Adelaide Advertiser Tournament. He also won the Grange Open again, a local event. But other than that he did not record many highlights. He later stated that the yips, an psychological affliction related to his putting, was interfering with his play.

In early 1965, Crafter's brother, Brian, advised him to return to his original putting form. This improved his play. In July, he played the South Australian Open at Kooyonga Golf Club. Crafter defeated his brother by one shot. In the middle of the year he also won the Grange Open again, for the fifth time. In early October, Crafter played the two-round Rosenthal Riverland golf tournament. After an "indifferent" even-par opening round he scored a course record 64 (−9) to finish joint second with his brother. The following year, in 1966, he won the South Australian PGA Championship for the final time. In October, Crafter played the four-round West End Tournament at Victor Harbour. In the third round, Crafter shot a 66 to take a three shot lead over Kel Nagle. Nagle, however, shot a final round 67 to take the clubhouse lead. Crafter, playing behind, was tied entering the final hole. However, he "pushed his tee shot into the rough" to lose any chance of outright victory. He recovered well, though, to secure par. He shared the win with Nagle. Crafter and Nagle finished four ahead of the next competitors and eight ahead of the rest of the field.

For the remainder of his career, Crafter largely worked as a club professional and golf course designer. Through the 1970s, Crafter continued to work at Glenelg. In the 1980s, Crafter began work as a club professional at Blackwood Golf Club in Cherry Gardens, South Australia. During this era, he also did some work as a golf course architect. While at Blackwood, he re-designed some holes. He also did architectural work at Tanunda Pines Golf Club and Mount Pleasant Golf Club. In the late 1980s, he began work at Port Lincoln Golf Club in Boston, South Australia. Crafter's advice precipitated the re-design of the course.

In 1993, Crafter largely retired from the golf industry. He still did some work as an independent golf coach though. Late in life, Crafter received a number of honors for his lifetime achievements. In 2011, he was inducted into the South Australian Golf Hall of Fame. That year, he was also inducted into the Glenelg's Hall of Fame.

== Personal life ==
Crafter was married in November 1951. He had four children. His niece is the professional golfer, Jane Crafter.

On 3 January 2017, Crafter died. He was 86 years old.

== Awards and honors ==
- In 2011, Crafter was inducted into the South Australian Golf Hall of Fame
- In 2011, Crafter was inducted into the Glenelg Hall of Fame

== Professional wins (28) ==
this list is incomplete

- 1950 South Australian PGA Championship
- 1951 South Australian PGA Championship
- 1955 South Australian PGA Championship
- 1956 South Australian PGA Championship, The Grange Open (tie with George Cussell)
- 1957 Adelaide Advertiser Tournament, South Australian Open, The Grange Open (tie with Dick Foot), South Australian PGA Championship
- 1958 South Australian Open, The Grange Open, South Australian PGA Championship
- 1959 Adelaide Advertiser Tournament, South Australian Open, South Australian PGA Championship, Victor Harbour Open
- 1960 South Australian PGA Championship
- 1962 South Australian Open
- 1963 South Australian Open, Central Australian tournament, Victor Harbour Open, Angove-Renmark golf tournament (tie with Bobby Brown)
- 1964 The Grange Open
- 1965 The Grange Open, South Australian Open
- 1966 South Australian PGA Championship, West End Tournament (tie with Kel Nagle)
- 1973 The Grange Open (tie with Wayne Simpson)

== Team appearances ==
- Vicars Shield (representing South Australia): 1950
