= Jack Harris (golfer) =

Australian professional golfer (1922–2014)

Personal information
- Full name: John Bruce Harris
- Nationality: Australia
- Born: 8 December 1922 West Footscray, Victoria, Australia
- Died: 22 August 2014 (aged 91) Melbourne, Australia
- Height: 1.70 m (5 ft 7 in)
- Spouse: Grace McGregor

Career
- Sport: Golf
- Turned professional: 1940
- Professional wins: 90

Number of wins by tour
- PGA Tour of Australasia: 8
- Other: 83

John Bruce Harris (8 December 1922 – 22 August 2014) was an Australian professional golfer. As a club professional he taught thousands of golfers and as a player he won 90 professional tournaments on the Australian golf circuit. Harris also served six years in the Australian Army during the Second World War. Harris won a record six Victorian PGA Championship titles from 1950 to 1963 and the Victorian PGA Championship trophy is named the "Jack Harris Cup" in his honour.

== Career ==
In 1940, before the age of 18, Harris turned pro. He became a junior PGA member under professional Colin Campbell at Long Island Golf Club.

His professional golfing career was then put on hold for the next six years when he was enlisted in the Australian Army during the Second World War. He spent this time serving as a sapper (a soldier of the engineer corps) in Darwin, Australia and later on Labuan Island in Borneo. Harris was discharged from the army in 1946, aged 24, to resume a golfing career after missing a critical development period.

Harris was reacquainted with Colin Campbell and Bob Spencer (Campbell's nephew) who were running a teaching school on top of the Manchester Unity Building in Melbourne CDB. Later they worked in Hartley's sports store on Flinders St. All of Harris's teaching and practice at this time was done by hitting into nets off rubber mats. Harris won his first Victorian PGA in 1950 at age 28 while he was still teaching golf at Hartley's sports store.

In the mid-1950s, Harris became club professional at Keysborough Golf Club where he stayed for most of his tournament playing career. Bob Spencer later followed as Harris's assistant. Throughout his time at Keysborough he earned his living as a typical club pro (by teaching, running the pro shop etc.) and just like many of his contemporaries practice time to sharpen up his game for tournament play was very limited. Despite this, Harris, throughout the 1950s and early 1960s was still ranked in the top handful of Australian golfers along with the likes of Peter Thomson, Jim Ferrier, Kel Nagle, Ossie Pickworth, Norman Von Nida, Eric Cremin, Frank Phillips, Bruce Crampton, Bruce Devlin.

In 1960, Harris travelled with fellow Australian pro Murray Crafter to Europe to play. He intended to play in 12 tournaments.

After his tournament playing days were over Harris also spent 13 years as the club and teaching professional at Sorrento Golf Club on the Mornington Peninsula. Harris also continued as a teaching professional at his own school in St Kilda. He will also be remembered for his golf segment on the Channel 7 TV World of Sport programme in the 1960s alongside AFL legend Lou Richards, following on in this role from his first golf teacher, Colin Campbell. Even into his 80s Harris continued to organise a series of pro-am events for senior professionals. Harris was always willing to teach anyone who was interested in the game and was still assisting with lessons at the Wattle Park GC into his 90s.

== Personal life ==
Harris died aged 91 in August 2014.

== Awards and honours ==
- In 2001, Harris was honored as a Life Member of PGA Australia.
- In 2011, Harris was an inaugural inductee into the Victorian Golf Hall of Fame.
- The trophy for Victorian PGA winners was named the "Jack Harris Cup" in his honor.

== Professional wins ==
this list may still be incomplete

- 1946 Victorian PGA Foursomes (with Colin Campbell)
- 1948 Yarra Yarra Open, Hartleys Easter Scratch
- 1949 Victoria Purse, Victorian PGA Foursomes (with Colin Campbell)
- 1950 Victorian PGA Championship, Victorian PGA Foursomes (with Colin Campbell), Spalding Bowl, Woodend Purse, Amstel Purse
- 1951 Penfold-Bromford Purse, Amstel Purse, Royal Canberra Fourball Purse
- 1952 Victorian Close Championship, Adelaide Advertiser Tournament, Slazenger Purse, Penfold-Bromford Purse, Don Walker Cup, Chesterfield, Amstel Purse
- 1953 West Victorian Open, Woodlands Coronation, Victorian Open Provincial, Keysborough GC Purse
- 1954 Albert Park Purse, Peter Scott Purse, Woodlands Open, Yarra Yarra Open, Williamstown Purse, Amstel Purse, Kew Purse
- 1955 Arthur Findlay Cup, Latrobe GC Purse, Liquor industry Purse, Keysborough Purse
- 1956 Peter Scott Purse, Woodlands Open, South West Victorian Open, Liquor Industry Purse, Williamstown Purse, Latrobe Purse
- 1957 Victorian PGA Championship, Liquor Industry Purse, Woodend Open, Victorian PGA Foursomes (with Bob Spencer), Yarra Yarra Open, Chesterfield Purse
- 1958 Liquor Industry Purse, Yarra Yarra Open, Woodlands Open, Keysborough Purse, Rossdale Testimonial, Northern Purse
- 1959 Victorian PGA Championship, Mount Lofty, Amstel, Victorian PGA Foursomes (with Bob Spencer), Woodlands Open, Yarrawonga Open, Green Acres Purse, Cranbourne Purse
- 1960 Victorian PGA Championship, Victorian Open, Yarra Yarra Easter Open, Victorian PGA Foursomes (with Bob Spencer), Yarrawonga Open, Keysborough Purse, Kooringal Purse, Northern Purse, 3AW Purse, Kingswood Purse
- 1961 Victorian PGA Championship, Henderson Purse, Victorian Close Championship, Woodlands Open, Liquor Industry Purse, Victoria Purse
- 1962 South West Victorian Open, Victorian Close Championship
- 1963 Victorian PGA Championship, NSW/Vic Border Open, Victoria GC Pro-am
- 1964 Woodlands Open, Van Cooth Celebrities, Liquor Industry Purse, Royal Melbourne Purse
- 1965 Woodlands Open, Keysborough Purse

== Team appearances ==
- Vicars Shield (representing Victoria): 1948, 1951 (winners), 1952 (winners), 1953 (winners), 1954, 1955
