= Vicars Shield =

Professional team golf tournament

Tournament information
- Established: 1930
- Format: Team match play
- Final year: 1956

Final champion
- New South Wales

The Vicars Shield was a professional team golf competition between the states of Australia. It was first played in 1930 and continued as an interstate event until 1956. It was the professional equivalent of the amateur Australian Men's Interstate Teams Matches, which had been held since 1904. The trophy was donated by Sir William Vicars.

In 1957 and 1958, the event was replaced with a "north" against "south" match before being abandoned. The shield was later reused for the interstate club professionals' competition, as part of the Australian Club Professional Championship.

== History ==
The first event was held at the Metropolitan Golf Club in 1930 between South Australia, Victoria and New South Wales. It was played as a triangular match with teams of eight playing singles in the morning and foursomes in the afternoon. Half of the team played each of the other two states. Matches were played over the full 18 holes, the result being decided by the sum of holes ahead in matches won. South Australia won with a total of 20 holes, with Victoria on 14 and New South Wales on 11. In 1931 at The Australian Golf Club the shield was played as a stroke-play event with teams of five, all five scores counting. New South Wales had three teams while Queensland and Tasmania playing as a combined team. South Australia won with a score of 373, 10 ahead of the combined Queensland and Tasmania team. The New South Wales teams came third, fourth and fifth with Victoria sixth. South Australian Willie Harvey had a round of 69, three better than anyone else. The format was revised in 1932 to be the same as the amateur event, teams of seven playing singles match-play. It was played at Royal Adelaide, three teams competing. Victoria beat New South Wales and then beat South Australia in the final.

In 1933, the team size was reduced to five, a format that was retained until the interstate event was dropped in 1956. New South Wales won the shield for the first time, beating Victoria 5–0 in the final. Although it was usually held the same day as the amateur interstate match, in 1934 it was held the day before. Queensland entered as a separate team for the first time and beat Victoria before losing 3–2 to New South Wales in the final. Queenslander Charlie Brown won both his matches. The 1935 event was played at Royal Adelaide and South Australia beat both New South Wales and Victoria 3–2 to regain the shield. Fergus McMahon beat both Billy Bolger and Ted Naismith. New South Wales regained the shield in 1936 but only after beating Victoria 3–2 in a close final. Four of the five matches went to the final hole, New South Wales winning two of these after extra holes. Billy Bolger won both of his matches after extra holes, with Bill Holder also twice on the day.

In 1937 four teams entered including Queensland and South Australia. These two teams didn't have enough player for a team and added players from other states, Queensland including a New South Wales player, while South Australia added two Tasmanians, the two teams playing each other in a morning match. However after the match was finished it was decided that the match involving these other players would not count. South Australia won two of the three matches, while Queensland, with four players to South Australia's three, were given another match to leave the match tied at two each. South Australia won a playoff but, with only three players, had little change in the final against New South Wales. They lost 4–1, Rufus Stewart having their only success. Royal Adelaide was the host course in 1938 but South Australia were unable to repeat their success of 1935, losing to New South Wales in the morning match. New South Wales beat Victoria 4–1 in the final to retain the shield. There were four team again in 1939, Western Australia entering for the first time, replacing Queensland. New South Wales met Victoria in the final and, although Norman Von Nida and Eric Cremin won the top two matches for New South Wales, Victoria won the last three to win the shield for the first time since 1932.

The organisation of Australian golf was changed after World War II with the open and amateur championships being separated, although they were often played in the same city at about the same time. The amateur interstate matches became a preliminary to the Australian Amateur while the Vicars Shield was a preliminary to the Australian Open. Five entered in 1946, meaning that the event spread over two days for the first time. Victoria beat South Australia and then Queensland to reach the final, but then lost 5–0 to New South Wales. There were only three teams at Royal Queensland in 1947 and one of those, Victoria, only had four players. A player short, Victoria beat Queensland in the morning but lost 4–1 to New South Wales in the afternoon, Ossie Pickworth winning their only point after beating Eric Cremin in the top match. There were five teams at Kingston Heath in 1948, although Queensland and Western Australia were a player short. New South Wales again beat Victoria in the final. Cremin reversed the result of the previous year against Pickworth, Martin Smith being the only Victorian winner. New South Wales won again in 1949, this time without losing a match, beating both Victoria and South Australia 5–0. The 1950 semi-final match between New South Wales and Victoria was very close. New South Wales won 3–2 with Jim Moran beating Martin Smith at the 19th hole. New South Wales went on to beat South Australia 5–0 in the final.

Victoria won in 1951, their first success since 1939, and won again in 1952 and 1953. They met New South Wales in all three finals, winning them all in close matches, 3–2. In 1951 Ossie Pickworth beat Norman Von Nida by 2 holes in the top match, with Martin Smith defeating Sid Cowling at the 19th hole. The 1952 event at Lake Karrinyup saw the top three Victorians, Peter Thomson, Pickworth and Jack Harris, all winning their matches. In 1953, Kel Nagle beat Thomson in the top match but Pickworth, Harris and Denis Denehey won their matches.

New South Wales regained the shield in 1954 with a narrow 3–2 win over Victoria. Ossie Pickworth beat Norman Von Nida but Kel Nagle, Eric Cremin and Jim McInnes won their matches. The 1955 event was held at Gailes in Queensland. Victoria had a narrow win over Queensland in the semi-final and met New South Wales in the final. Pickworth again beat Von Nida but wins by Nagle, Cremin and Len Woodward ensured that New South Wales retained the shield. Les Wilson and Len Boorer were still level after 20 holes but abandoned their match with the result decided. 1956 was the last time the shield was contested as an interstate contest. South Australia only had four players and didn't enter, leaving just two teams. Von Nida, Nagle, Cremin withdrew from the New South Wales team and, as a result, Pickworth and Harris withdrew from the Victorian team. New South Wales won the match 5–0.

In 1957 the shield was contested as a north versus south match at Kingston Heath Golf Club. The north consisted of New South Wales and Queensland with the south being the remaining states. There were teams of 10 playing singles and foursomes. As in 1956, some of the leading players decided not to play. In 1958 the shield was used for a match for young professionals. After a number of years the shield was reused for the interstate club professionals' competition, as part of the Australian Club Professional Championship.

== Results ==
Year	Winners	Runners-up	Teams	Venue	Ref.
1930	South Australia	Victoria	3	Metropolitan	
1931	South Australia	Queensland/Tasmania	6	The Australian	
1932	Victoria	South Australia	3	Royal Adelaide	
1933	New South Wales	Victoria	3	Royal Melbourne	
1934	New South Wales	Queensland	3	Royal Sydney	
1935	South Australia	Victoria	3	Royal Adelaide	
1936	New South Wales	Victoria	3	Metropolitan	
1937	New South Wales	South Australia	4	The Australian	
1938	New South Wales	Victoria	4	Royal Adelaide	
1939	Victoria	New South Wales	4	Royal Melbourne	
1940–1945: No tournament due to World War II
1946	New South Wales	Victoria	5	Royal Sydney	
1947	New South Wales	Victoria	3	Royal Queensland	
1948	New South Wales	Victoria	5	Kingston Heath	
1949	New South Wales	South Australia	3	The Australian	
1950	New South Wales	South Australia	3	Kooyonga	
1951	Victoria	New South Wales	3	Metropolitan	
1952	Victoria	New South Wales	4	Lake Karrinyup	
1953	Victoria	New South Wales	3	Royal Melbourne	
1954	New South Wales	Victoria	3	Kooyonga	
1955	New South Wales	Victoria	3	Gailes	
1956	New South Wales	Victoria	2	Royal Sydney	

== Teams ==
=== New South Wales ===
- 1930: Billy Bolger, Charlie Campbell, Will Corry, Arthur Downes, Frank Eyre, Tom Howard, Sandy Robertson, Don Spence
- 1931 Team 1: Billy Bolger, Walter Clark, Frank Eyre, Charlie Gray, Tom Howard
- 1931 Team 2: Will Corry, William Mackenzie, Fred Popplewell, Sam Richardson, Don Spence
- 1931 Team 3: Charlie Campbell, Arthur Downes, Arthur East, Vic James, Jim Petterson
- 1932: Bill Campbell, Charlie Campbell, Frank Eyre, Vic James, William Mackenzie, Sam Richardson, Don Spence
- 1933: Billy Bolger, Frank Eyre, Charlie Gray, Sam Richardson, Tom Heard
- 1934: Billy Bolger, Joe Cohen, Charlie Gray, Lou Kelly, Sam Richardson
- 1935: Billy Bolger, Joe Cohen, Charlie Gray, Lou Kelly, Sam Richardson
- 1936: Billy Bolger, Charlie Booth, Bill Holder, Sam Richardson, Don Spence
- 1937: Billy Bolger, Eric Cremin, Lou Kelly, Sam Richardson, Norman Von Nida
- 1938: Eric Cremin, William Mackenzie, Jim Petterson, Sam Richardson, Norman Von Nida
- 1939: Billy Bolger, Eric Cremin, Sam Richardson, Don Spence, Norman Von Nida
- 1946: Billy Bolger, Eric Cremin, Lou Kelly, Ossie Pickworth, Sam Richardson
- 1947: Billy Bolger, Fred Bolger, Dick Carr, Eric Cremin, Dan Cullen
- 1948: Billy Bolger, Eric Cremin, Bill Holder, Lou Kelly, Kel Nagle
- 1949: Eric Cremin, Bill Holder, Billy McWilliam, Kel Nagle, Norman Von Nida
- 1950: Sid Cowling, Eric Cremin, Jim Moran, Kel Nagle, Billy McWilliam
- 1951: Norman Berwick, Sid Cowling, Eric Cremin, Kel Nagle, Norman Von Nida
- 1952: Jimmy Adams, John Collins, Eric Cremin, Kel Nagle, Norman Von Nida
- 1953: Eric Cremin, Bill Holder, Kel Nagle, Les Wilson, Len Woodward
- 1954: Eric Cremin, Jim McInnes, Kel Nagle, Frank Phillips, Norman Von Nida
- 1955: Eric Cremin, Kel Nagle, Norman Von Nida, Les Wilson, Len Woodward
- 1956: Sid Cowling, Bruce Crampton, Frank Phillips, Les Wilson, Len Woodward

New South Wales had three teams in 1931.

=== Queensland ===
- 1931: Joe Cohen (Q), Alex Denholm (Q), Les McManus (T), Jock Robertson (T), Harry Sinclair (Q)
- 1934: Charlie Brown, Alex Denholm, Arthur Gazzard, Arch McArthur, Ossie Walker
- 1937: Charlie Brown, Arthur Gazzard, Arch McArthur, Ossie Walker
- 1938: Eddie Anderson, Doug Katterns, Ossie Stanley, Ossie Walker, Reg Want
- 1946: Arthur Gazzard, Joe Heath, Jim McInnes, Ossie Walker, Reg Want
- 1947: Eddie Anderson, Ken Jones, Jim McInnes, Ossie Walker, Reg Want
- 1948: Ken Jones, Jim McInnes, Ossie Walker, Reg Want
- 1955: Jack Brown, Doug Katterns, Ossie Walker, Reg Want, Darrell Welch

Queensland and Tasmania had a combined team in 1931.

=== South Australia ===
- 1930: Alex Denholm (Q), Willie Harvey, Jimmy McLachlan, Fergus McMahon, Les McManus (T), Jock Robertson (T), Harry Sinclair (Q), Rufus Stewart
- 1931: Ernie Bissett, Willie Harvey, Jimmy McLachlan, Fergus McMahon, Rufus Stewart
- 1932: Eric Alberts, Willie Harvey, Jimmy McLachlan, Fergus McMahon, Rufus Stewart, Fred Thompson, Alf Toogood
- 1933: Willie Harvey, Jimmy McLachlan, Fergus McMahon, Rufus Stewart, Fred Thompson
- 1935: Willie Harvey, Jimmy McLachlan, Fergus McMahon, Rufus Stewart, Alf Toogood
- 1936: Bruce Auld, Willie Harvey, Jimmy McLachlan, Fergus McMahon, Rufus Stewart
- 1937: Willie Harvey, Bill Robertson, Rufus Stewart
- 1938: Bruce Auld, Willie Harvey, Fergus McMahon, Bill Robertson, Rufus Stewart
- 1939: Bruce Auld, Willie Harvey, Bill Kenyon, Bill Robertson, Rufus Stewart
- 1946: Bruce Auld, Alex Bullock, Willie Harvey, Angus Polson, Rufus Stewart
- 1948: Bruce Auld, Denis Denehey, Willie Harvey, Jim Mills, Gordon Westthorp
- 1949: Bruce Auld, Alex Bullock, Denis Denehey, Jim Mills, Gordon Westthorp
- 1950: Bruce Auld, Murray Crafter, Willie Harvey, Fred Thompson, Gordon Westthorp
- 1951: Bruce Auld, Angus Polson, Fred Thompson, Gordon Westthorp
- 1952: Bruce Auld, Brian Crafter, Angus Polson, Fred Thompson, Gordon Westthorp
- 1953: George Cussell, Bob James, Jim Mills, Fred Thompson
- 1954: Bruce Auld, George Cussell, Jim Mills, Fred Thompson, Gordon Westthorp

The South Australian team included two players from Queensland and two from Tasmania in 1930.

=== Victoria ===
- 1930: Reg Jupp, Arthur Le Fevre, George Naismith, Ted Naismith, Arthur Spence, Don Thomson, Ernie Wood, Jock Young
- 1931: Charlie Conners, Bill Fowler, George Naismith, Arthur Spence, Jock Young
- 1932: Bill Fowler, George Jordan, Reg Jupp, George Naismith, Ted Naismith, Billy Smith, Ernie Wood
- 1933: Horace Boorer, Charlie Conners, Reg Jupp, George Naismith, Ted Naismith
- 1934: Horace Boorer, Charlie Conners, George Naismith, Ted Naismith, Ernie Wood
- 1935: Horace Boorer, George Naismith, Ted Naismith, Martin Smith, Ernie Wood
- 1936: Ron Harris, George Naismith, Ted Naismith, Martin Smith, Ernie Wood
- 1937: Horace Boorer, Charlie Conners, Ron Harris, George Naismith, Ted Naismith
- 1938: Ron Harris, George Naismith, Ted Naismith, Billy Smith, Martin Smith
- 1939: George Naismith, Ted Naismith, Martin Smith, Arthur Spence, Ernie Wood
- 1946: Horace Boorer, Bert Ferguson, Bill Fowler, George Naismith, Ted Naismith, Billy Smith, Martin Smith
- 1947: Len Boorer, Ted Naismith, Ossie Pickworth, Martin Smith
- 1948: Bill Clifford, Jack Harris, Ted Naismith, Ossie Pickworth, Martin Smith
- 1949: George Naismith, Ted Naismith, Ossie Pickworth, Al Whykes, Ray Wright
- 1950: Len Boorer, Colin Campbell, George Naismith, Ted Naismith, Martin Smith
- 1951: Denis Denehey, Jack Harris, Ted Naismith, Martin Smith, Ossie Pickworth, Peter Thomson
- 1952: Denis Denehey, Jack Harris, George Naismith, Ossie Pickworth, Peter Thomson, Ray Wright
- 1953: Jack Boorer, Denis Denehey, Jack Harris, Ossie Pickworth, Peter Thomson
- 1954: Bob Brown, Denis Denehey, Jack Harris, Ted Naismith, Ossie Pickworth
- 1955: Len Boorer, Bob Brown, Jack Harris, Ken Loy, Ted Naismith, Ossie Pickworth
- 1956: Bob Brown, Brian Huxtable, Ken Loy, John Sullivan, Brian Twite

=== Western Australia ===
- 1939: Harry Godden, Tom Howard, Nev Johnston, Charlie Snow, Fred Thompson
- 1946: Eric Alberts, Harry Godden, Nev Johnston, Charlie Snow, Fred Thompson
- 1948: Eric Alberts, Ossie Gallon, Harry Godden, Fred Thompson
- 1952: Jock Borthwick, Tom Howard, Charles Jackson, Charlie Newman, Les Nicholls

== See also ==
- Australian Men's Interstate Teams Matches
