= Martin Smith (golfer) =

Australian professional golfer (c.1915–1969)

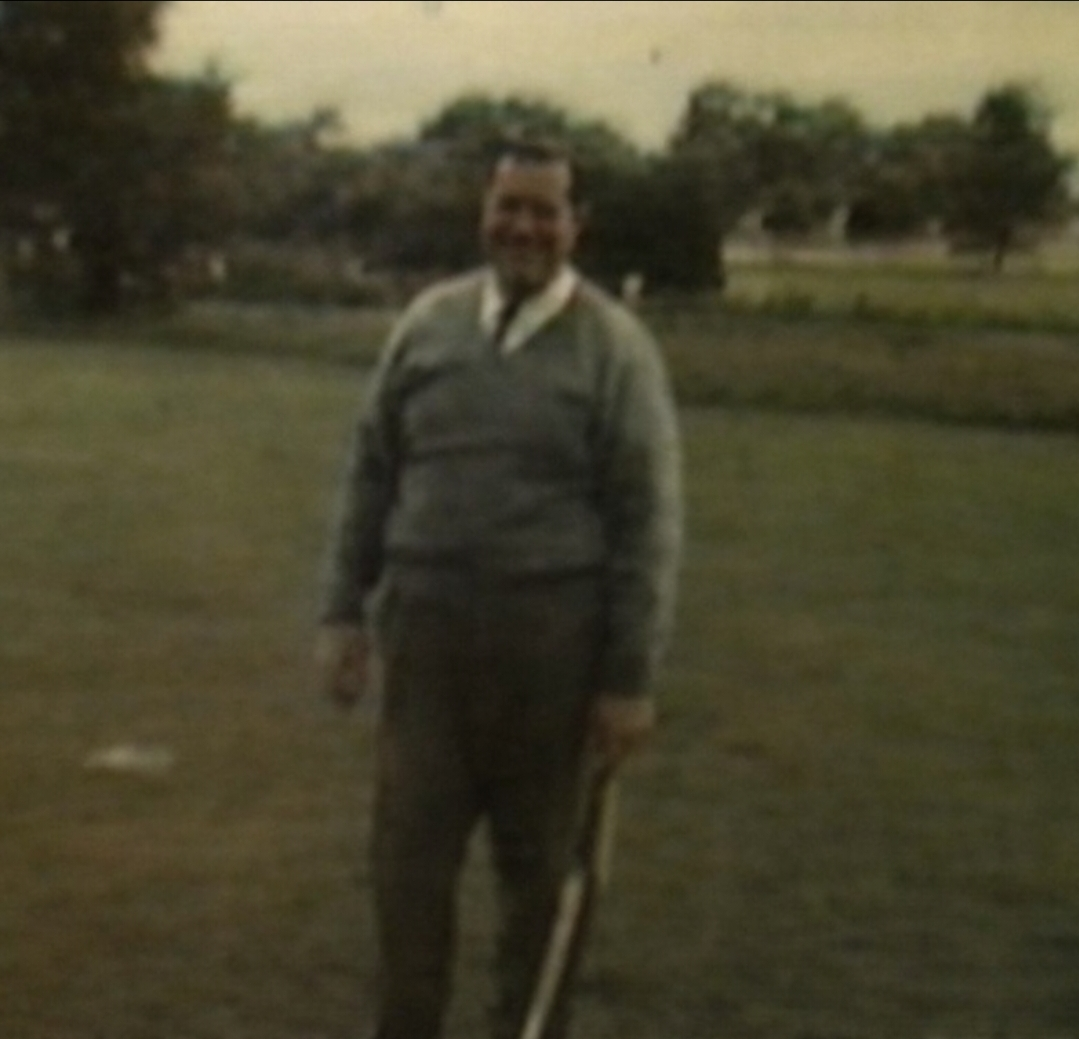
- Martin Smith at Spring Valley Golf Club

Personal information
- Full name: Martin Alloysius Smith
- Nationality: Australia
- Born: c. 1915 Heatherton, Victoria, Australia
- Died: 26 May 1969 Royal Melbourne Hospital, Melbourne, Australia
- Children: 3

Career
- Sport: Golf
- Turned professional: c. 1931

Martin Smith (c. 1915 – 26 May 1969) was an Australian professional golfer active from the 1930s to the 1950s. He won the Victorian Professional Championship twice, in 1939 and 1951 and was a runner-up in the 1939 Australian Open. He represented Victoria in the Vicars Shield interstate professional team competition 9 times between 1935 and 1951.

== Golf career ==
In 1931, Smith competed in assistant professionals' tournaments at Albert Park, where newspaper coverage described his play as steady and accurate, emphasising straight hitting and consistency rather than reliance on exceptional putting. By 1933, Smith was being mentioned regularly in golf columns as a rising Victorian professional. He set a course record of 64 at Croydon, a performance reported nationally and cited as evidence of his exceptional long-iron play.

In March 1939, Smith was appointed club professional at Northern, a position he held for approximately eleven years.

In 1939, Smith shot a course-record 67 at Royal Melbourne West to lead a strong open field.

Later that year, he set a new record on the Commonwealth course.

Smith won the Victorian PGA Championship for the first time in 1939. He led the qualifying rounds of the championship with a total score of 155, entering the match-play stages as the leading qualifier. He defeated Charlie Conner by 5 up and 4 in the final at Commonwealth Golf Club.

In May 1941 Smith won the Dunlop Cup at Metropolitan Golf Club with an aggregate score of 146 (73–73). In addition to tournament play, Smith regularly appeared in exhibition matches and instructional tours across Victoria and interstate, and was frequently described as one of the State's leading professional golfers in contemporary press coverage.

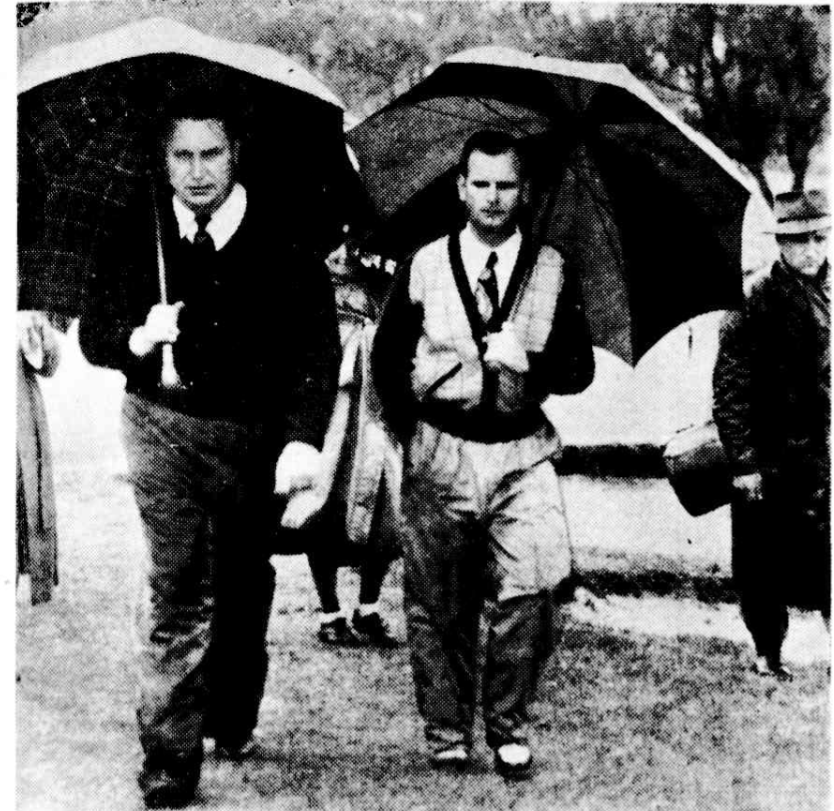
Martin Smith (Left) and Norman von Nida (Right) at the Victorian PGA championships, Victoria Golf Club

During the Second World War, Smith participated in patriotic exhibitions and challenge matches. In September 1941, he contested a 72-hole match against Norman Von Nida, played across Royal Melbourne and Northern. Mid-match reports recorded Smith holding a two-up lead over Von Nida after the opening stages of the contest. Von Nida ultimately won the match at the 71st hole, with newspapers noting large crowds and substantial funds raised for wartime causes. In pre-match commentary, Von Nida publicly described Smith as "the best Victoria has,".

After the war, Smith returned to high-level competition. In 1946, he achieved interstate success, including a professional purse victory at Manly, finishing ahead of Ossie Pickworth and Kel Nagle.

In 1947, Smith broke the course record at Torquay and defeated Pickworth. The following day, he tied with Pickworth at Northern, with reports noting that Smith had "regained the form which put him in the top flight of Australian golfers," despite playing with a persistent back injury that required the use of a steel corset.

Later that year, Smith partnered Bill Clifford to win the Victorian Foursomes Championship at Woodlands, securing the title by a single stroke.

Smith won his second Victorian PGA Championship in 1951, defeating Jack Boorer by 7 and 5 over 36 holes at Southern Golf Club (New Brighton).

In 1953, he won the Peter Scott professional purse at Kingswood, marking the closing phase of his tournament career.

Smith represented Victoria in the Vicars Shield, the interstate professional team competition of the period. He played 9 times between 1935 and 1951. He was twice on the winning team, in 1939 and 1951, with Victoria beating New South Wales 3–2 in the final on both occasions. Smith beat Billy Bolger by 1 hole in the 1939 final and beat Sid Cowling in the 1951 final. Smith was 3 down to Cowling after 7 holes but fought back to win at the 19th hole.

== Course records ==
During his professional career, Smith set or equalled multiple course records at leading golf clubs in Victoria and interstate. Contemporary newspaper reports described him as repeatedly producing record rounds in competitive play, including at Kingston Heath Golf Club, where he "improved on the long-standing course record", and at Royal Melbourne Golf Club (West Course), where he "set a course record of 67 to lead the field in the first round of the Australian Open". Further record rounds were reported at Croydon Golf Club, Commonwealth Golf Club, Long Island Country Club, Brisbane Golf Club and Torquay Golf Club, where he broke the existing course record previously held by George Naismith. These record-setting performances occurred across open championships, professional purse events and club open meetings, and spanned more than a decade.

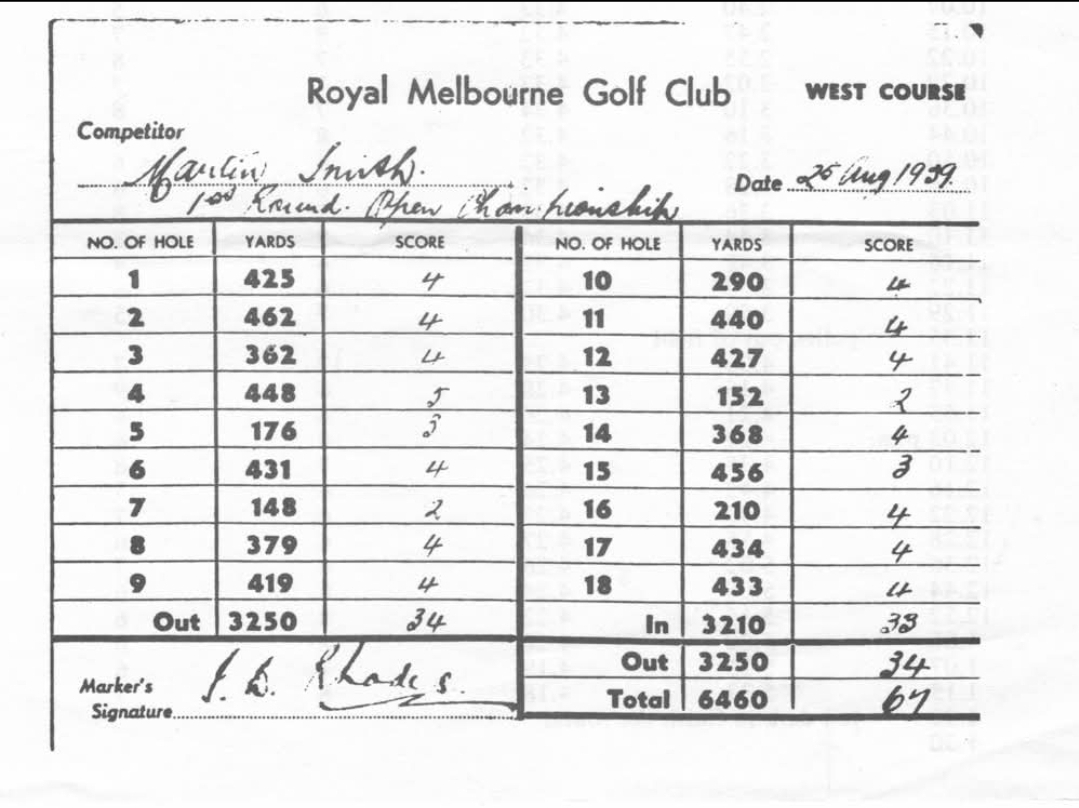
Martin Smith's 1939 scorecard at Royal Melbourne Golf Club

== Playing style ==
Contemporary newspaper accounts consistently described Smith as a powerful ball-striker and long hitter, particularly effective with long irons. His game was characterised by straight hitting and consistency rather than reliance on exceptional putting.Observers frequently noted his effectiveness in match play and his ability to apply sustained pressure over extended contests.

Tributes published following his death described him as a "very good iron player" and a "very tenacious competitor," attributes that defined his reputation among fellow professionals.

== Personal life ==
Smith lived in Caulfield and later Beaumaris, remaining close to Melbourne's Sandbelt golf courses throughout his life. In addition to his club duties, he operated a professional golf shop in the Metropole Arcade off Bourke Street in central Melbourne, advertising golf equipment and repair services during the 1940s.

Smith died on 26 May 1969 at the Royal Melbourne Hospital, aged 54. He was survived by his wife, two sons and a daughter. His eldest son, Bryan Smith, later became a professional golfer and served as a club professional at several Victorian golf clubs, and also competed in professional golf, including the Victorian Close Championship.

== Professional wins ==
- 1933 Assistant Professionals' Championship
- 1934 Bromford Purse
- 1936 Woodlands Open, Spalding Purse (Victoria)
- 1937 PGA–Ocobo Ball
- 1939 Victorian PGA Championship
- 1940 Findlay Cup, Brisbane Purse
- 1941 Dunlop Cup (Victoria)
- 1945 Victorian Professional Foursomes Championship (with Bill Clifford)
- 1946 Amstel Park Tournament, Manly purse
- 1947 Northern purse, Torquay Amateur-Professional, Victorian Professional Foursomes Championship (with Bill Clifford)
- 1951 Victorian PGA Championship, Victorian Professional Foursomes Championship (with Bill Clifford)
- 1953 Patterson River purse, Peter Scott purse, Victorian Professional Foursomes Championship (with Bill Clifford)

== Team appearances ==
- Vicars Shield (representing Victoria): 1935, 1936, 1938, 1939 (winners), 1946, 1947, 1948, 1950, 1951 (winners)
