= Dunlop Cup (Australia) =

Golf tournament

Tournament information
- Location: Australia
- Established: 1930
- Final year: 1952

The Dunlop Cup was a series of annual professional golf tournaments held in Australia from 1930 to 1952. Four separate events were held each year, in New South Wales, South Australia, Queensland and Victoria. The tournaments were sponsored by Dunlop Perdriau Rubber Co., later renamed Dunlop Rubber Australia.

== History ==
Initially all four tournaments were played as match-play events over four days. There was a 36-hole stroke-play stage with the leading 8 playing 36-hole match-play. Later some states changed the format to 72-hole stroke-play over two days and later to 36 holes in a single day. After World War II, all events were contested as 36 holes of stroke-play on one day.

Ossie Walker won the Queensland event six times, matched by Ossie Pickworth who won the South Australian event six times in succession, although once he was a joint winner. Bruce Auld, Eric Cremin and Reg Want each won the event four times.

== Winners ==
=== New South Wales ===
Year	Winner	Score	Margin of victory	Runner(s)-up	Venue	Ref
1930	(Australia) Tom Howard	1 up		(Australia) Billy Bolger	The Australian	
1931	(Australia) Dan Soutar	4 & 3		(Australia) Tom Howard	Royal Sydney	
1932	No tournament					
1933	(Australia) Frank Eyre	1 up		(Australia) Tom Heard	The Australian	
1934	(Australia) Dan Soutar (2)	298	1 stroke	(Australia) Billy Bolger	The Lakes	
1935	(Australia) Lou Kelly	285	1 stroke	(Australia) Billy Bolger (Australia) Tom Howard	The Australian	
1936	(Australia) Bill Holder	145	2 strokes	(Australia) Sam Richardson	The Lakes	
1937	(Australia) Norman Von Nida	148	2 strokes	(Australia) Billy Bolger (Australia) Sam Richardson	Bonnie Doon	
1938	(Australia) Norman Von Nida (2)	142	1 stroke	(Australia) Eric Cremin	Bonnie Doon	
1939	(Australia) Sam Richardson	147	Playoff (Note: Richardson won the 9-hole playoff by 2 strokes)	(Australia) Billy Bolger	New South Wales	
1940	(Australia) Charlie Booth	140	1 stroke	(Australia) Billy Bolger	The Lakes	
1941	(Australia) Fred Bolger	147	1 stroke	(Australia) Eric Cremin (Australia) Alex Thompson	Bonnie Doon	
1942–1945: No tournament due to World War II
1946	(Australia) Billy Bolger	146	1 stroke	(Australia) Lou Kelly (Australia) Ossie Pickworth	Concord	
1947	(Australia) Eric Cremin	144	3 strokes	(Australia) Sid Cowling	Bonnie Doon	
1948	(Australia) Eric Cremin (2)	143	4 strokes	(Australia) Lou Kelly	New South Wales	
1949	(Australia) Norman Von Nida (3)	145	1 stroke	(Australia) Bill Holder	Manly	
1950	(Australia) Eric Cremin (3)	143	3 strokes	(Australia) Reg Want	Pymble	
1951	(Australia) Eric Cremin (4)	142	6 strokes	(Australia) Kel Nagle	The Lakes	
1952	(Australia) Len Woodward	138	2 strokes	(Australia) Kel Nagle	Pennant Hills	

=== Queensland ===
Year	Winner	Score	Margin of victory	Runner(s)-up	Venue	Ref
1930	(Australia) Harry Sinclair	10 & 8		(Australia) Leo Corry	Brisbane	
1931	(Australia) Harry Sinclair (2)	3 & 2		(Australia) Tom Southcombe	Royal Queensland	
1932	(Australia) Jack Quarton	7 & 6		(Australia) Harry Sinclair	Goodna	
1933	(Australia) Ossie Walker	w/o		(Australia) Peter Porter	Brisbane	
1934	(Australia) Ossie Walker (2)	2 & 1		(Australia) Jack Quarton	Indooroopilly	
1935	(Australia) Ossie Walker (3)	1 up		(Australia) Eddie Anderson	Victoria Park	
1936	(Australia) Arch McArthur	3 & 2		(Australia) Alex Denholm	Royal Queensland	
1937	(Australia) Eddie Anderson	2 & 1		(Australia) Ossie Walker	Brisbane	
1938	(Australia) Eddie Anderson (2)	7 & 6		(Australia) Charlie Brown	Gailes	
1939	(Australia) Ossie Walker (4)	7 & 5		(Australia) Arthur Gazzard	Victoria Park	
1940	(Australia) Reg Want	7 & 5		(Australia) Ossie Stanley	Indooroopilly	
1941	(Australia) Ossie Walker (5)	9 & 8		(Australia) Eddie Anderson	Royal Queensland	
1942–1945: No tournament due to World War II
1946	(Australia) Reg Want (2)	146	1 stroke	(Australia) Ossie Walker	Indooroopilly	
1947	(Australia) Ossie Walker (6)	146	2 strokes	(Australia) Reg Want	Brisbane	
1948	(Australia) Reg Want (3)	147	1 stroke	(Australia) Ossie Walker	Peninsula	
1949	(Australia) Jack Brown	150	1 stroke	(Australia) Reg Want	Gailes	
1950	(Australia) Doug Katterns	154	Playoff (Note: Katterns won the 9-hole playoff by 1 stroke)	(Australia) Arthur Gazzard	Nudgee	
1951	(Australia) Doug Katterns (2)	141	2 strokes	(Australia) Jack Brown	Virginia	
1952	(Australia) Reg Want (4)	139	1 stroke	(Australia) John Summersgill	Victoria Park	

=== South Australia ===
Year	Winner	Score	Margin of victory	Runner(s)-up	Venue	Ref
1930	(Scotland) Willie Harvey	1 up		(Australia) Rufus Stewart	Royal Adelaide	
1931	(Scotland) Ernie Bissett	2 & 1		(Australia) Fergus McMahon	Royal Adelaide	
1932	(Australia) Alf Toogood	2 & 1		(Australia) Jimmy McLachlan	Glenelg	
1933	(Australia) Fred Thompson	306	2 strokes	(Australia) Fergus McMahon	Kooyonga	
1934	(Scotland) Willie Harvey (2)	5 & 4		(Australia) Rufus Stewart	Royal Adelaide	
1935	(Australia) Fergus McMahon	6 & 4		(Australia) Alf Toogood	Kooyonga	
1936	(Australia) Fergus McMahon (2)	7 & 6		(Australia) Rufus Stewart	Glenelg	
1937	(Australia) Fergus McMahon (3)	6 & 5		(Australia) Bill Robertson	Royal Adelaide	
1938	(Australia) Bill Robertson	2 & 1		(Australia) Fergus McMahon	Kooyonga	
1939	(Australia) Bruce Auld	3 & 1		(Australia) Rufus Stewart	Royal Adelaide	
1940	(Australia) Rufus Stewart	5 & 4		(Australia) Bruce Auld	Kooyonga	
1941	(Australia) Rufus Stewart (2)	1 up		(Scotland) Willie Harvey	Royal Adelaide	
1942–1945: No tournament due to World War II
1946	(Scotland) Willie Harvey (3)	150	2 strokes	(Australia) Bill Robertson	Royal Adelaide	
1947	(Australia) Bruce Auld (2)	150	1 stroke	(Australia) Denis Denehey	Glenelg	
1948	(Australia) Gordon Westthorp	156	2 strokes	(Scotland) Willie Harvey	Kooyonga	
1949	(Australia) Bruce Auld (3)	151	3 strokes	(Australia) Alex Bullock (Australia) Denis Denehey	Royal Adelaide	
1950	(Australia) Bruce Auld (4)	150	3 strokes	(Australia) Murray Crafter	Kooyonga	
1951	(Australia) Murray Crafter	149	3 strokes	(Australia) Fred Thompson	Glenelg	
1952	(Australia) Brian Crafter	156	3 strokes	(Australia) Jim Mills	The Grange	

=== Victoria ===
Year	Winner	Score	Margin of victory	Runner(s)-up	Venue	Ref
1930	(Australia) Reg Jupp	4 & 3		(Australia) Arthur Spence	Commonwealth	
1931	(Australia) Bill Fowler	11 & 10		(Australia) Don Thomson	Yarra Yarra	
1932	(Australia) Ted Naismith	5 & 4		(Australia) Don Thomson	Victoria	
1933	(Australia) Horace Boorer	7 & 6		(Australia) Hugh Thomson	Kingston Heath	
1934	(Australia) Ted Naismith (2)	294	7 strokes	(Australia) Ron Harris	Royal Melbourne	
1935	(Australia) Ted Naismith (3)	299	3 strokes	(Australia) Ron Harris (Australia) Reg Jupp	Metropolitan	
1936	(Australia) Ernie Wood	146	3 strokes	(Australia) George Naismith	Commonwealth	
1937	(Australia) Ernie Wood (2)	146	2 strokes	(Australia) Horace Boorer (Australia) Ron Harris	Kingston Heath	
1938	(Australia) Ron Harris	144	6 strokes	(Australia) Viv Billings (Australia) Ted Naismith	Metropolitan	
1939	(Australia) Charlie Conners				Kingston Heath	
1940	(Australia) Don Walker	147	1 stroke	(Australia) George Jordan	Royal Melbourne	
1941	(Australia) Martin Smith	146	1 stroke	(Australia) Ted Naismith	Metropolitan	
1942–1945: No tournament due to World War II
1946	No tournament					
1947	(Australia) Ossie Pickworth	294	4 strokes	(Australia) Ted Naismith	Commonwealth	
1948	(Australia) Ossie Pickworth (2)	144	1 stroke	(Australia) Bill Clifford	Kingswood	
1949	(Australia) Ossie Pickworth (3)	149	4 strokes	(Australia) Colin Campbell	Metropolitan	
1950	(Australia) Ossie Pickworth (4)	138	12 strokes	(Australia) Martin Smith	Yarra Yarra	
1951	(Australia) Ossie Pickworth (5)	150	2 strokes	(Australia) Jack Harris	Commonwealth	
1952	(Australia) Ossie Pickworth (6) (Australia) Peter Thomson	141	Tied		Kew	
