= Victorian PGA Championship =

Australian golf tournament

Coordinates: 38.405°S 144.850°E

Tournament information
- Location: Fingal, Victoria, Australia
- Established: 1922
- Courses: Moonah Links (Open and Legends Courses)
- Par: 72 (O); 71 (L)
- Length: 7,370 yards (6,740 m) (O); 6,858 yards (6,271 m) (L)
- Tours: PGA Tour of Australasia; Von Nida Tour; Australasian Development Tour
- Format: Stroke play
- Prize fund: A$250,000
- Month played: December

Tournament record score
- Aggregate: 266 Alistair Presnell (2010)
- To par: −22 as above
- Score: 12 and 11 Peter Thomson (1953)

Current champion
- (Australia) Marc Leishman

Location map
- Location in Australia Location in Victoria

The Victorian PGA Championship is a golf tournament played in Victoria, Australia. It has been part of the PGA Tour of Australasia each season since 2009. It is the oldest of the state professional championships, having been first held in 1922.

== History ==
The first Victorian Professional Championship was held in November 1922 and was open to any professional in Australia and New Zealand. It was a 72-hole stroke-play event with 36 holes played at Royal Melbourne on 6 November and 36 holes played at Victoria Golf Club two day later. It attracted a number of New South Wales players as well as the professionals from Victoria. Billy Iles and Dan Soutar, one of the NSW players, were tied on 158 after the first day's play. Soutar won after the second day with a score of 313, a stroke ahead of Tom Howard, another NSW professional, with Iles dropping back to third place.

The 1923 championship followed the same format as in 1922. Arthur Le Fevre, the Royal Melbourne professional. led by 3 strokes after the first day but, with two rounds of 74 of the second day, pulled away and won by 14 strokes. Rowley Banks and Charlie Campbell, from NSW, tied for second place. The only change in format in 1924 was the order of the courses, with the Victoria course played first. A number of NSW players were expected but none appeared. Rowley Banks won by a stroke, with a score of 310. In 1925, the first day's play was at Kingston Heath Golf Club, with the second day at Royal Melbourne. Ted Smith, from Tasmania, trailed after the first day, but with rounds of 73 and 76 at Royal Melbourne, won by 8 strokes.

From 1926 the championship was played at a single venue. Ted Smith, now a Victorian professional, won again in 1926, at Royal Melbourne, with some good scoring in difficult conditions on the second day. Smith was in the United States at the time of the 1927 championship and didn't defend his title at Metropolitan Golf Club. Horace Boorer won the title by two strokes. The 1928 championship at Kingston Heath was won by Rufus Stewart from South Australia in a close contest with Billy Bolger from New South Wales.

The championship became a match-play event in 1929. There was a 36-hole stroke-play qualifying day after which the leading 8 played 36-hole match-play. From 1933 the number of qualifiers was increased to 16, extending the event to 5 days. Defending champion, Rufus Stewart, reached final in 1929, but lost 6&5 to Reg Jupp. There were a number of two-time winners in the 1930s. George Naismith won in 1932 and 1934 beating Horace Boorer both times, Boorer losing three finals in a row. Ted Naismith won in 1935 and 1936, while Charlie Connors won in 1937 and 1938. Ted Naismith reached his third successive final in 1937, losing to Connors. In 1939, Connors himself reached his third final in a row, but lost to Martin Smith.

The 1946 and 1947 championships were played as 72-hole stroke-play events. Eric Cremin won them both, but my small margins. In 1946 he tied with another New South Wales professional, Norman Von Nida. There was an 18-hole playoff with Cremin winning by 3 strokes, 70 to 73. The following year he won by a stroke from Denis Denehey, having trailed by 3 shots after three rounds. In 1948 the event returned to its pre-war format, with 16 qualifiers on the first day, playing four days of match-play. Cremin did not compete, the event clashing with the New South Wales Close Championship. Ossie Pickworth led the qualifying by 9 strokes and won the championship, beating Sam Walsh 10&9 in the final. Cremin won his third title in 1949, beating Jack Harris in final. Harris had defeated Pickworth in the first match-play round. Harris reached the final again in 1950 beating Pickworth in the final. The match was decided at the 37th hole, the only match-play final that went to extra holes. Martin Smith won his second title in 1951, 12 years after his first. Peter Thomson won the championship in 1952 and 1953. In 1952 he beat Pickworth in a close final, but he won the 1953 final against Denis Denehey by a record score, 12 & 11. Pickworth had his second and third wins in 1954 and 1955, beating Harris on both occasions.

In 1956 the championship became a 72-hole stroke-play event. Ossie Pickworth won his third successive title and fourth in all, finishing two strokes ahead of Jack Harris. Harris won in 1957 and 1959 but was beaten by Peter Mills in 1958, who won by 6 strokes. For some years the prize money on offer had not attracted out-of-state professionals, but in 1960 three local businesses sponsored the event, which had prize money of £1,200, attracting a number of the leading New South Wales professionals. However, Harris retained his title and won the £400 first prize, with Kel Nagle a stroke behind in second place. Prize money dropped to £500 in 1961 but most of the leading Australians played, with the event played on the Monday and Tuesday after the Australian Open, which was played at Victoria Golf Club, finishing on the Saturday. Harris won for the fifth time, two ahead of the Australian Open winner, Frank Phillips. The prize money was maintained at £500 up to 1965. Three New South Wales professionals won this period, Kel Nagle in 1962, Bruce Devlin in 1964 and Alan Murray in 1965, with Harris winning for the sixth time in 1963.

From 1966 to 1976 the championship returned to being a largely domestic event. In 1969, Jack Harris came close to winning his seventh title. He was tied with Geoff Parslow but lost the 18-hole playoff by 8 strokes. In 1977 the championship was incorporated into the Albury-Wodonga Classic, which had prize money of A$15,000. It was won by Vaughan Somers from Queensland. In 1978 and 1979 the event was known as the Garden State Victorian PGA Championship and had prize money of A$50,000. The American Lanny Wadkins won in 1978, with Ian Stanley winning in 1979 after a playoff. Loss of sponsorship meant that prize money dropped to A$15,000 in 1980, below the minimum for a tour event. A full tour event was planned for 1981 but dropped because of lack of sponsorship, eventually being replaced by an event at Warrnambool, with smaller prize money. The 1982 event was also a non-tour event, reduced to 54 holes with prize money of A$10,000.

An event was planned at Woodlands in 1983 but was cancelled due to lack and sponsorship. The event was moved to Warrnambool, who had already secured enough prize money for a full tour event. The event, which eventually had prize money of A$40,000, was won by Vaughan Somers, his second win in the championship. The event remained at Warrnambool for a further three years. Prize money rose to A$50,000 in 1984, Wayne Riley winning after a playoff against Ian Baker-Finch. Rodger Davis won in 1985, 7 strokes ahead of the field. Prize money doubled to A$100,000 in 1986, with Wayne Smith winning by 2 strokes. The Warrnambool event was cancelled in 1987 because of the lack of TV coverage and the championship was played at the end of December, as part of the 36-hole Carpet Call pro-am. The event returned at Keysborough in January 1989 as a full tour event, with prize money of A$100,000. David Ecob won by a stroke from Peter Senior.

The event was played over 54 holes from 1991 to 1993 before returning to the 72-hole format in 1994 as part of the new second-tier Foundation Tour, Stuart Appleby winning the event after a playoff. The event later became part of the Von Nida Tour before the second-tier events were added to the main tour in 2009. Since 2000 both Gareth Paddison and Ashley Hall have won the championship twice. From 2002 to 2021 total prize money was in the range A$100,000 to A$137,500, but was increased to A$250,000 for the centenary championship in 2022.

== Winners ==
Year	Tour (Note: ANZ − PGA Tour of Australasia; ANZDT − Australasian Development Tour; FT − Foundation Tour; VNT − Von Nida Tour.)	Winner	Score	To par	Margin of victory	Runner(s)-up	Venue	Ref.
Victorian PGA Championship
2025	ANZ	(Australia) Marc Leishman (2)	282	−5	1 stroke	(Australia) Josh Younger	Moonah Links	
2024	ANZ	(Australia) Cory Crawford	273	−14	1 stroke	(United States) Tyler McCumber	Moonah Links	
2023	ANZ	(Australia) David Micheluzzi	274	−14	1 stroke	(Australia) Ben Eccles	Moonah Links	
2022	ANZ	(Australia) Andrew Martin	279	−9	Playoff	(Australia) Adam Bland (Australia) Brett Coletta (Australia) Lincoln Tighe	Moonah Links	
2021 (Dec)	ANZ	(Australia) Blake Windred	276	−12	1 stroke	(Australia) Brad Kennedy	Moonah Links	
2021 (Feb)	ANZ	(Australia) Christopher Wood	268	−20	1 stroke	(New Zealand) James Anstiss (Australia) Michael Sim	Moonah Links	
2020	ANZ	Cancelled due to the COVID-19 pandemic						
2019	ANZ	(New Zealand) Campbell Rawson	270	−10	1 stroke	(Australia) Marcus Fraser	RACV Cape Schanck	
2018	ANZ	(Australia) Aaron Pike	270	−10	1 stroke	(New Zealand) Ryan Chisnall	RACV Cape Schanck	
2017	ANZ	(Australia) Damien Jordan	272	−16	2 strokes	(Australia) Aron Price	Huntingdale	
Mercedes-Benz Truck and Bus Victorian PGA Championship
2016	ANZ	(Australia) Ashley Hall (2)	277	−11	Playoff (Note: Hall won at the first extra hole)	(Australia) David McKenzie	Huntingdale	
2015	ANZ	(Australia) Aaron Townsend	275	−13	1 stroke	(Australia) Scott Strange	Huntingdale	
Lexus of Blackburn Victorian PGA Championship
2014	ANZ	(New Zealand) Gareth Paddison (2)	272	−16	1 stroke	(New Zealand) Michael Hendry	Heritage (St. John)	
Turner Plumbing Victorian PGA Championship
2013	ANZ	(Australia) David McKenzie	275	−13	2 strokes	(Australia) Scott Laycock	Forest Resort Creswick	
Adroit Insurance Group Victorian PGA Championship
2012	ANZ	(New Zealand) Gareth Paddison	277	−7	1 stroke	(Australia) Leighton Lyle	Forest Resort Creswick	
Victorian PGA Championship
2011	ANZ	(Australia) James Nitties	198	−18	1 stroke	(Australia) Peter O'Malley	Sandhurst (North)	
Cellarbrations Victorian PGA Championship
2010	ANZ	(Australia) Alistair Presnell	266	−22	1 stroke	(Australia) Kurt Barnes (Australia) David Bransdon	Sandhurst (North)	
2009	ANZ	(Australia) Andre Stolz	271	−17	2 strokes	(Australia) Stuart Bouvier	Sanctuary Lakes	
NAB Victorian PGA Championship
2008	VNT	(Australia) Marc Leishman	269	−19	1 stroke	(Australia) Kurt Barnes (Australia) Cameron Percy	Sanctuary Lakes	
2007	VNT	(Australia) Ashley Hall	277	−11	Playoff	(Australia) Tristan Lambert	Sanctuary Lakes	
National Australia Bank Victorian PGA Championship
2006	VNT	(Australia) Steven Jeffress	272	−16	1 stroke	(Australia) Marc Leishman (Australia) Anthony Painter	Sanctuary Lakes	
2005	VNT	(Australia) Cameron Percy	273	−15	1 stroke	(Australia) Steven Bowditch	Sanctuary Lakes	
2004: No tournament
Links Group Victorian PGA Championship
2003	VNT	(Australia) Martin Doyle	277	−11	2 strokes	(Australia) Chris Downes	Kew	
Victorian PGA Championship
2002	ANZ	(Australia) Craig Carmichael	270	−10	Playoff (Note: Carmichael won with birdie on first extra hole)	(Australia) Craig Jones	Kew	
Crown Victorian PGA Championship
2001	ANZDT	(Australia) Nathan Gatehouse	273	−15	1 stroke	(Australia) Gavin Coles	Kew	
2000	ANZDT	(Australia) Matthew Habgood	274	−6	1 stroke	(Australia) Malcolm Baker (Australia) Michael Etherington	Albert Park	
Victorian PGA Championship
1999		(Australia) Chris Gaunt	202	−8	1 stroke	(Australia) Aaron Baddeley (a)	Albert Park	
1998		(Australia) Kevin Booker	203	−7	3 strokes	(Australia) David Bransdon	Albert Park	
1997		(Australia) Jason Dawes					Keysborough	
1996	FT	(Australia) Mike Harwood	208	−11	4 strokes	(Australia) Mark Allen	Keysborough	
1995	FT	(Australia) David Armstrong (2)	281	−11	Playoff (Note: Armstrong won at the fourth extra hole)	(Australia) Paul Gow	Keysborough	
1994	FT	(Australia) Stuart Appleby	281	−11	Playoff (Note: Appleby won at the first extra hole)	(Australia) Anthony Edwards	Keysborough	
1993	FT	(Australia) Michael Barry	210	−9	1 stroke	(Australia) Stuart Appleby (Australia) Paul Moloney	Keysborough	
1992		(Australia) David Armstrong	213	−6	3 strokes	(Australia) Darren Cole	Keysborough	
1991		(Australia) Andrew Labrooy	219	E	1 stroke	(Australia) David McKenzie	Keysborough	
1990: No tournament
Asthma Foundation Victorian PGA Championship
1989	ANZ	(Australia) David Ecob	279	−13	1 stroke	(Australia) Peter Senior	Keysborough	
1988: No tournament
Carpet Call PGA Championship
1987		(Australia) Peter Senior	126	−10	Playoff (Note: Senior won at the first extra hole)	(Australia) Glenn Joyner	Ivanhoe	
Black Magic Victorian PGA Championship
1986	ANZ	(Australia) Wayne Smith	275	−13	2 strokes	(Australia) Terry Gale	Warrnambool	
Victorian PGA Championship
1985	ANZ	(Australia) Rodger Davis	270	−18	7 strokes	(Australia) Ossie Moore	Warrnambool	
1984	ANZ	(Australia) Wayne Riley	274	−14	Playoff (Note: Riley won at the second extra hole)	(Australia) Ian Baker-Finch	Warrnambool	
1983	ANZ	(Australia) Vaughan Somers (2)	280	−8	1 stroke	(New Zealand) John Lister	Warrnambool	
1982		(Australia) Trevor McDonald	211	−5	5 strokes	(Australia) Ian Stanley	Yarrawonga and Border	
Nescafe Victorian PGA Championship
1981		(New Zealand) Alex Bonnington	282	−6	1 stroke	(United States) Pat Mateer (Australia) Glen McCully	Warrnambool	
Victorian PGA Championship
1980		(Australia) Bill Britten	280	−4	1 stroke	(Australia) Mike Cahill	Rosebud	
Garden State Victorian PGA Championship
1979	ANZ	(Australia) Ian Stanley	286	−2	Playoff (Note: Stanley won at the second hole of a sudden-death playoff)	(Australia) Stewart Ginn	Woodlands	
1978	ANZ	(United States) Lanny Wadkins	281	−7	3 strokes	(Australia) Bob Shearer	Woodlands	
Albury-Wodonga Classic
1977	ANZ	(Australia) Vaughan Somers	273	−11	1 stroke	(Australia) Chris Witcher	Wodonga	
Victorian PGA Championship
1976		(Australia) Glenn McCully	279	−9	4 strokes	(Australia) Bill Britten	Donnington Park	
1975		(England) Guy Wolstenholme	286	+2	3 strokes	(Australia) Rob McNaughton	Long Island	
1974		(Australia) Stewart Ginn	285	+2	6 strokes	(Australia) John Davis	Long Island	
1973		(Australia) Bruce Green (2)	291	+7	Playoff (Note: Green won the 18-hole playoff by 9 strokes)	(Australia) Rob McNaughton	Long Island	
1972		(Australia) John Davis	297	+13	4 strokes	(Australia) Charlie Oliver	Long Island	
1971		(Australia) Peter Mills (2)	288	+4	3 strokes	(Australia) Bob Jennings	Long Island	
1970		(Australia) Bob Jennings						
1969		(Australia) Geoff Parslow	292	+4	Playoff (Note: Parslow won the 18-hole playoff by 8 strokes)	(Australia) Jack Harris	Waverley	
1968		(Australia) Alan Heil	282	−6	7 strokes	(Australia) Jack Harris	Waverley	
1967		(Australia) Bruce Green	284	E	1 stroke	(Australia) Alan Heil	Waverley	
1966		(Australia) Geoff Flanagan	289	−11	4 strokes	(Australia) Brian Huxtable	Huntingdale	
1965		(Australia) Alan Murray	293		2 strokes	(Australia) Jack Harris (Australia) Peter Mills	Woodlands	
1964		(Australia) Bruce Devlin	277	−11	7 strokes	(Australia) Ted Ball	Latrobe	
1963		(Australia) Jack Harris (6)	273	−19	4 strokes	(United States) Ron Howell	Long Island	
1962		(Australia) Kel Nagle	286	−10	1 stroke	(Australia) Frank Phillips (Australia) Bob Tuohy	Patterson River	
1961		(Australia) Jack Harris (5)	276	−16	2 strokes	(Australia) Frank Phillips	Keysborough	
1960		(Australia) Jack Harris (4)	283		1 stroke	(Australia) Kel Nagle	Cranbourne	
1959		(Australia) Jack Harris (3)	285	+1	5 strokes	(Australia) Bob Brown	Medway	
1958		(Australia) Peter Mills	280	−4	6 strokes	(Australia) Jack Harris	Latrobe	
1957		(Australia) Jack Harris (2)	278	−2	7 strokes	(Australia) Bob Brown	Croydon	
1956		(Australia) Ossie Pickworth (4)	288		2 strokes	(Australia) Jack Harris	Long Island	
1955		(Australia) Ossie Pickworth (3)	2 and 1			(Australia) Jack Harris	Amstel	
1954		(Australia) Ossie Pickworth (2)	5 and 4			(Australia) Jack Harris	Rossdale	
1953		(Australia) Peter Thomson (2)	12 and 11			(Australia) Denis Denehey	Commonwealth	
1952		(Australia) Peter Thomson	2 and 1			(Australia) Ossie Pickworth	Victoria	
1951		(Australia) Martin Smith (2)	7 and 5			(Australia) Jack Boorer	Southern (New Brighton)	
1950		(Australia) Jack Harris	37 holes			(Australia) Ossie Pickworth	Kingston Heath	
1949		(Australia) Eric Cremin (3)	5 and 4			(Australia) Jack Harris	Yarra Yarra	
1948		(Australia) Ossie Pickworth	10 and 9			(Australia) Sam Walsh	Commonwealth	
1947		(Australia) Eric Cremin (2)	290		1 stroke	(Australia) Denis Denehey	Riversdale	
1946		(Australia) Eric Cremin	289		Playoff (Note: Cremin won the 18-hole playoff by 3 strokes)	(Australia) Norman Von Nida	Victoria	
1940–1945: No tournament due to World War II
1939		(Australia) Martin Smith	5 and 4			(Australia) Charlie Connors	Commonwealth	
1938		(Australia) Charlie Connors (2)	8 and 7			(Australia) Ron Harris	Metropolitan	
1937		(Australia) Charlie Connors	5 and 4			(Australia) Ted Naismith	Victoria	
1936		(Australia) Ted Naismith (2)	5 and 3			(Australia) Bert Ferguson	Metropolitan	
1935		(Australia) Ted Naismith	5 and 4			(Australia) Bill Fowler	Riversdale	
1934		(Australia) George Naismith (2)	9 and 8			(Australia) Horace Boorer	Kingston Heath	
1933		(Australia) Bert Ferguson	2 and 1			(Australia) Horace Boorer	Commonwealth	
1932		(Australia) George Naismith	5 and 4			(Australia) Horace Boorer	Royal Melbourne	
1931		(Australia) Bill Fowler	2 up			(Australia) Reg Jupp	Victoria	
1930		(Australia) Don Thomson	4 and 3			(Australia) Arthur Le Fevre	Kingston Heath	
1929		(Australia) Reg Jupp	6 and 5			(Australia) Rufus Stewart	Royal Melbourne	
1928		(Australia) Rufus Stewart	314		2 strokes	(Australia) Billy Bolger	Kingston Heath	
1927		(Australia) Horace Boorer	302		2 strokes	(Australia) Arthur Le Fevre	Metropolitan	
1926		(Australia) Ted Smith (2)	311		8 strokes	(Australia) Arthur Le Fevre (Australia) Rufus Stewart	Royal Melbourne	
1925		(Australia) Ted Smith	305		8 strokes	(Australia) John Young	Kingston Heath/ Royal Melbourne	
1924		(Australia) Rowley Banks	310		1 stroke	(Australia) John Young	Victoria/ Royal Melbourne	
1923		(Australia) Arthur Le Fevre	304		14 strokes	(Australia) Rowley Banks (Australia) Charlie Campbell	Royal Melbourne/ Victoria	
1922		(Australia) Dan Soutar	313		1 stroke	(Australia) Tom Howard	Royal Melbourne/ Victoria	
