= South Australian PGA Championship =

OG Roberts South Australian PGA Championship
Tournament information
- Location: Mount Gambier, South Australia, Australia
- Established: 1927
- Course: Blue Lake Golf Club
- Par: 67
- Length: 5,993 yards (5,480 m)
- Tours: PGA Tour of Australasia; Von Nida Tour; Australasian Development Tour
- Format: Stroke play
- Prize fund: A$110,000
- Month played: April
- Final year: 2008

Tournament record score
- Aggregate: 248 Heath Reed (2008)
- To par: −20 Richard Ball (2002) −20 Heath Reed (2008)
- Score: 8 and 7 Rufus Stewart (1939)

Final champion
- (Australia) Heath Reed

Location map
- Location in Australia Location in South Australia

The South Australian PGA Championship was a professional golf tournament played in South Australia. It was first held in 1927.

== History ==
The first South Australian Professional Championship was held in 1927 and was a 72-hole stroke-play event. It was won by Rufus Stewart, four ahead of Fergus McMahon. Stewart had recently won the Australian Open. McMahon won in 1928, 1929 and 1930, and as a three-time winner he permanently kept the trophy that had been presented in 1927. With only a small number of professional in the state, there were only four different winners in the first 15 championships. Stewart won 6 times and McMahon 5 times, while Alf Toogood won twice, before he moved to Tasmania, and Willie Harvey also won twice, in 1938 and 1940. The format changed to match-play in 1937, all matches being over 36 holes. In 1937 and 1938 there were just 8 entries and a straight knock-out format was used. However, there were 9 entries in 1939 and a 36-hole qualifying stage was used to reduce the field to 8. In 1940 the qualifying stage was retained but just four players advanced to the match-play stage. The 1941 event was reduced to a single day, with 36 holes of stroke-play.

The championship resumed in 1946, using the 1940 format with four players qualifying, and this format was retained for a number of years. From 1946 to 1950 only 16 players qualified for the Australian PGA Championship. Each state was allocated a specific number of places and organised their own qualifying event for those places. South Australia was allocated just one place. In 1946 there was a 36-hole qualifying event but from 1947 to 1950 the winner of the South Australian Professional Championship qualified.

In the early 1950s, there were a few notable tournaments. In 1951, in the semifinals, while playing against Murray Crafter, competitor Willie Harvey had a heart attack on the 11th hole and died. Administrators considered cancelling the event. However, they ultimately decided that the tournament would proceed though the finals would be delayed about a week. Crafter would go on to win, defeating his brother Brian Crafter 6 & 5. In 1952, there was a dispute between the two finalists, Brian Crafter and Fred Thompson. Crafter won the match at the 38th hole but at the 35th hole he had lifted and dropped his ball away from a staked tree. Thompson objected and the matter was not fully resolved until just before the 1953 event, confirming Crafter as the winner.

== Winners ==
Year	Tour (Note: ANZ − PGA Tour of Australasia; ANZDT − Australasian Development Tour; FT − Foundation Tour; VNT − Von Nida Tour.)	Winner	Score	To par	Margin of victory	Runner(s)-up	Venue	Ref.
OG Roberts South Australian PGA Championship
2008	VNT	(Australia) Heath Reed	248	−20	2 strokes	(Australia) Tristan Lambert (Australia) Peter Senior (Australia) Aaron Townsend	Blue Lake	
Hahn South Australian PGA Championship
2007	VNT	(Australia) Tim Wise	266	−14	Playoff	(Australia) Ashley Hall	Blue Lake	
South Australian PGA Championship
2006	VNT	(Australia) David Diaz	279	−9	1 stroke	(Australia) Dean Alaban	Tanunda Pines	
SA PGA Championship
2005	VNT	(Australia) Tony McFadyean	273	−15	1 stroke	(Australia) Andrew Duffin	The Grange	
Schweppes SA PGA Championship
2004	VNT	(Australia) Martin Doyle	282	−6	5 strokes	(Australia) Brad Lamb	The Grange	
2003	VNT	(Australia) Stuart Bouvier (2)	268	−16	1 stroke	(Australia) Scott Hend	The Vines	
2002	ANZ	(Australia) Richard Ball	264	−20	5 strokes	(Australia) Adrian Percey	The Vines	
2001	ANZDT	(Australia) Tony Carolan	282	−10	Playoff	(Australia) Chris Gray	Tea Tree Gully	
Schweppes South Australian PGA Championship
2000	ANZDT	(Australia) Chris Gray	279	−9	2 strokes	(Australia) Craig Carmichael	Glenelg	
South Australian PGA Championship
1998–1999: No information known
1997		(Australia) David Capaldo	205	−11	2 strokes	(Australia) Shane Robinson	McCracken	
1996	FT	(Australia) Lyndsay Stephen	278	−10	Playoff	(Australia) Craig Spence	McCracken	
1995	FT	(Australia) Stuart Bouvier	206	−10	Playoff	(Australia) David Bransdon	McCracken	
Lasseters SA and NT PGA Championship
1994	FT	(Australia) Stuart Appleby	201	−15	11 strokes	(Australia) Michael Barry	Alice Springs	
South Australian PGA Championship
1993		(Australia) Mark Officer	202		2 strokes	(United States) Mike Colandro	Wirrina Cove	
1990–1992: No information known
1989		(Australia) Roger Stephens	142	−2	1 stroke	(Australia) Peter Lonard	Wirrina	
1978–1988: No information known
1977		(Australia) David Galloway					Flagstaff Hill	
1976		(Australia) Bob Tuohy	285	−3	1 stroke	(Australia) Frank Phillips	Flagstaff Hill	
1975		(Australia) Vaughan Somers	287		2 strokes	(Australia) Vic Bennetts (Australia) Frank Phillips		
1974		(Australia) John Sheargold	288		1 stroke	(Australia) Stan Peach		
1973	ANZ	(Australia) Stan Peach						
1972: No information known
1971		(Australia) Vic Bennetts			9 strokes	(Australia) Barry Coxon (Australia) Bill Dunk (United States) Jerry Stolhand		
1970		(Australia) Glen McCully	290		3 strokes	(Australia) Murray Crafter (Australia) Dennis Ingram (Australia) Stan Peach	Kooyonga	
1962–1969: No information known
1961		(Australia) John Sullivan	2 and 1			(Australia) Murray Crafter		
1960		(Australia) Murray Crafter (8)	6 and 5			(Australia) John Sullivan	Royal Adelaide	
1959		(Australia) Murray Crafter (7)				(Australia) Brian Crafter	Kooyonga	
1958		(Australia) Murray Crafter (6)	3 and 2			(Australia) Brian Crafter	Royal Adelaide	
1957		(Australia) Murray Crafter (5)						
1956		(Australia) Murray Crafter (4)						
1955		(Australia) Murray Crafter (3)						
1954		(Australia) Bruce Auld (3)	1 up			(Australia) Murray Crafter	Royal Adelaide	
1953		(Australia) Fred Thompson	2 up			(Australia) Murray Crafter	Royal Adelaide	
1952		(Australia) Brian Crafter	38 holes			(Australia) Fred Thompson	Kooyonga	
1951		(Australia) Murray Crafter (2)	6 and 5			(Australia) Brian Crafter	Royal Adelaide	
1950		(Australia) Murray Crafter	5 and 4			(Australia) Gordon Westthorp	Kooyonga	
1949		(Australia) Bruce Auld (2)	37 holes			(Scotland) Willie Harvey	Royal Adelaide	
1948		(Australia) Gordon Westthorp	2 up			(Australia) Denis Denehey	Kooyonga	
1947		(Australia) Denis Denehey	6 and 5			(Scotland) Willie Harvey	Royal Adelaide	
1946		(Australia) Bruce Auld	4 and 3			(Scotland) Willie Harvey	Kooyonga	
1942–1945: No tournament due to World War II
1941		(Australia) Rufus Stewart (6)	159		4 strokes	(Australia) Sam Walsh	Kooyonga	
1940		(Scotland) Willie Harvey (2)	2 up			(Australia) Fergus McMahon	Kooyonga	
1939		(Australia) Rufus Stewart (5)	8 and 7			(Australia) Bill Robertson	Royal Adelaide	
1938		(Scotland) Willie Harvey	5 and 3			(Australia) Bruce Auld	Kooyonga	
1937		(Australia) Fergus McMahon (5)	5 and 4			(Australia) Rufus Stewart	Royal Adelaide	
1936		(Australia) Rufus Stewart (4)	301		4 strokes	(Australia) Fergus McMahon	Royal Adelaide	
1935		(Australia) Rufus Stewart (3)	294		4 strokes	(Australia) Fergus McMahon	Royal Adelaide	
1934		(Australia) Fergus McMahon (4)	297		14 strokes	(Australia) Alf Toogood	Kooyonga	
1933		(Australia) Alf Toogood (2)	296		2 strokes	(Australia) Fergus McMahon	Royal Adelaide	
1932		(Australia) Alf Toogood	302		2 strokes	(Australia) Rufus Stewart	Royal Adelaide	
1931		(Australia) Rufus Stewart (2)	303		5 strokes	(Scotland) Willie Harvey	Royal Adelaide	
1930		(Australia) Fergus McMahon (3)	307		Playoff	(Australia) Alf Toogood	Royal Adelaide	
1929		(Australia) Fergus McMahon (2)	296		4 strokes	(Australia) Rufus Stewart	Royal Adelaide	
1928		(Australia) Fergus McMahon	297		4 strokes	(Australia) Rufus Stewart	Royal Adelaide	
1927		(Australia) Rufus Stewart	299		5 strokes	(Australia) Fergus McMahon	Royal Adelaide	
