= Billy Bolger =

Australian professional golfer

Personal information
- Full name: William Joseph Bolger
- Nationality: Australia
- Born: 20 January 1910 Sydney, New South Wales, Australia
- Died: 27 May 1977 (aged 67) Sydney, New South Wales, Australia

Career
- Sport: Golf
- Status: Professional

William Joseph Bolger (20 January 1910 – 27 May 1977) was an Australian professional golfer. He won the Australian Open in 1934, finishing three strokes ahead of Gene Sarazen. He also won the New South Wales Professional Championship twice, in 1930 and 1939 and represented Australia in the Lakes International Cup in 1934 and 1936.

== Early life ==
Bolger was born in Mortlake, Sydney on 20 January 1910. He was one of a number of golfing brothers. Fred and Ted were professionals while Jim was an amateur. He was originally an assistant to Tom Howard at Concord Golf Club, before becoming the professional at Parramatta Golf Club in 1929 and later at the new course at Oatlands Golf Club in 1931. In early 1935 he left Oatlands to take up a teaching position at Mick Simmons sports store.

== Professional career ==
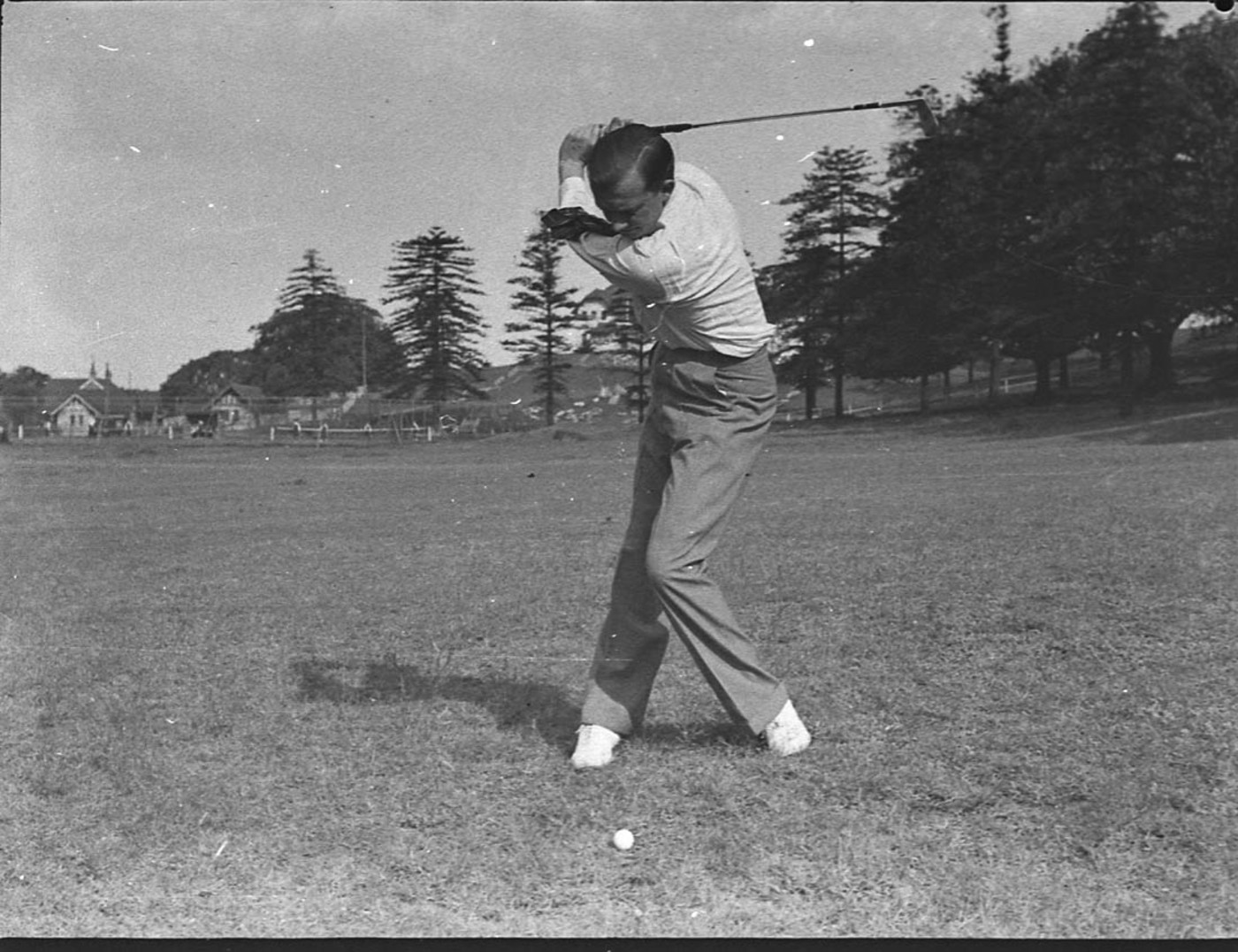
Bolger at Moore Park in 1939

Bolger first came to wide notice in 1928 when he finished fourth in the Australian Open at Royal Sydney and runner-up to Rufus Stewart in the Victorian Professional Championship at Kingston Heath. Bolger and Stewart were level after three rounds before Stewart won by two strokes in a close finish.

Bolger's first big win was in the 1930 New South Wales Professional Championship at Royal Sydney, where he beat Dan Soutar, 8 and 7, in the 36-hole final. Earlier in 1930 he had reached the final of the New South Wales Dunlop Cup but lost to his ex-boss Tom Howard in the final, by one hole. In 1931 Bolger reached the final of the Australian Professional Championship, losing, 2 and 1, to Don Spence. Bolger came close to winning the New South Wales Professional Championship again in 1933, but lost a close final against Charlie Gray by one hole. They were level playing the final hole, but Bolger missed a short putt to give Gray the title.

In 1934 Bolger had his biggest success, winning the Australian Open at Royal Sydney. The championship saw the first serious American challenger with Gene Sarazen competing. He was on a world tour with Joe Kirkwood Jr. However Bolger won the open with a new record score of 283, with Sarazen second and Kirkwood fourth. The following week, Bolger reached the final of the Australian Professional Championship, losing, 2 and 1, Lou Kelly. He was selected for the Australian team for the inaugural Lakes International Cup at The Lakes Golf Club. The United States won the match 9–0. Earlier in 1934 he had been runner-up to Dan Soutar in the New South Wales Dunlop Cup at The Lakes.

Between 1935 and World War II, Bolger's only significant win was in the 1939 New South Wales Professional Championship at Concord, where he beat Norman Von Nida, 5 and 4, in the final. He best finish in this period in the Australian Open was in the defence of his title in 1935. He had a poor first day and despite having the best score on the final day, only finished tied for third place. He was runner-up in a number of tournaments, in the Lakes Open in 1936 and 1939 and in the New South Wales Dunlop Cup in 1935, 1937, 1939 and 1940. In the 1936 Lakes Open he was the leading professional, behind Jim Ferrier, while in 1939 he lost an 18-hole playoff to Von Nida by one stroke. By 1940 Bolger had been runner-up six times in the Dunlop Cup without winning. In early 1936 Bolger was one of the six-man Australian team in the second Lakes International Cup at Lakewood Country Club, Long Beach, California. Bolger lost his singles match, 9 and 8, to Horton Smith.

Bolger continued to have some success after World War II. He finally won the New South Wales Dunlop Cup in 1946, by a stroke from Lou Kelly and Ossie Pickworth in the 36-hole event. He was tied for fifth place in the 1949 Australian Open, 14 strokes behind Eric Cremin, and he finished runner-up, a stroke behind Cremin, in the 1950 New South Wales Close Championship. As late as 1956 he was runner-up, with Cremin, in the Lakes Open. An amateur, Harry Berwick, won the event so Bolger and Cremin shared the first prize money.

== Later life ==
Bolger died on 27 May 1977 at his home in Concord, Sydney. He had had a heart attack in the late 1950s.

== Professional wins ==
- 1930 New South Wales Professional Championship
- 1934 Australian Open
- 1939 New South Wales Professional Championship
- 1946 Dunlop Cup (New South Wales)

== Team appearances ==
- Lakes International Cup (representing Australia): 1934, 1936
- Vicars Shield (representing New South Wales): 1930, 1931, 1933 (winners), 1934 (winners), 1935, 1936 (winners), 1937 (winners), 1939, 1946 (winners), 1947 (winners), 1948 (winners)
