= Ampol Tournament =

Tournament information
- Location: Australia
- Established: 1947
- Final year: 1959

Final champion
- Kel Nagle and Gary Player

The Ampol Tournament was the richest golf event of its time in Australia. From 1952 the sponsor, Ampol, offered great prize money to attract the leading American and European players to compete.

Total prize money was initially A£1,000, rising to A£1,300 in 1951. In 1952 and 1954, two tournaments were arranged a few weeks apart. Prize money was A£3,500 for each of the 1952 events while each of the 1954 events had prize money of A£1,500. The A£10,000 in 1956 was the biggest purse outside the United States. Prize money was A£2,500 in 1953 and 1955 and A£3,000 in 1957 and 1959. Prize money often exceeded the advertised figures since part of the proceeds from gate receipts was sometimes added.

The 1959 tournament was played the week before the 1959 Canada Cup.

== Winners ==
Year	Winner	Country	Venue	Score	Margin of victory	Runner(s)-up	Winner's share (A£)	Ref
1947	Ossie Pickworth	Australia	The Australian Golf Club	294	1 stroke	(Australia) Billy Bolger	300	
1948 (Apr)	Ossie Pickworth (2)	Australia	Huntingdale Golf Club	300	2 strokes	(Australia) Reg Want	250	
1948 (Nov)	Ossie Pickworth (3)	Australia	The Lakes Golf Club	293	5 strokes	(Australia) Kel Nagle	250	
1949	Ossie Pickworth (4)	Australia	Woodlands Golf Club	277	10 strokes	(Australia) Eric Cremin	250	
1950	Alex Murray	New Zealand	Glenelg Golf Club	283	3 strokes	(Australia) Eric Cremin	250	
1951	Ossie Pickworth (5)	Australia	The Brisbane Golf Club	276	8 strokes	(Australia) Eric Cremin	350	
1952 (Oct)	Norman Von Nida	Australia	The Lakes Golf Club	288	Playoff	(United States) Ed Oliver	625	
1952 (Nov)	Lloyd Mangrum	United States	Yarra Yarra Golf Club	281	1 stroke	(Australia) Peter Thomson	625	
1953	Ossie Pickworth (6)	Australia	The Lakes Golf Club	288	3 strokes	(Australia) Len Woodward	600	
1954 (Oct)	Dutch Harrison	United States	The Lakes Golf Club	292	1 stroke	(Australia) Ossie Pickworth	375	
1954 (Nov)	Peter Thomson	Australia	Yarra Yarra Golf Club	282	6 strokes	(Australia) Kel Nagle (Australia) Ossie Pickworth	375	
1955	Eric Cremin	Australia	The Lakes Golf Club	285	7 strokes	(Australia) Ossie Pickworth	1,000	
1956	Gary Player	South Africa	Yarra Yarra Golf Club	280	6 strokes	(United States) Bo Wininger	5,000	
1957	Gary Player (2)	South Africa	The Australian Golf Club	281	2 strokes	(Wales) Dave Thomas	800	
1958	No tournament							
1959	Kel Nagle; Gary Player (3)	Australia; South Africa	The Australian Golf Club	212	Tie	Shared title	Shared 800 and 400	

In October 1952 Von Nida beat Oliver 72 to 77 in the 18-hole playoff. In November 1954 the first round was played at Huntingdale Golf Club. The 1959 event was over 54 holes. Ampol sponsored a 36-hole tournament in 1958 with total prize money of A£500. This event was won by an amateur, Bob Stevens.
