= Lakes Open =

Golf tournament

The Lakes Open was a golf tournament played at The Lakes Golf Club in Sydney, New South Wales, Australia between 1934 and 1974.

== History ==
The inaugural event was organised in connection with the visit of a group of American professionals who had earlier played in the Lakes International Cup.

It was held annually until World War II with Jim Ferrier and Norman Von Nida both winning twice. It did not restart until 1947 and was held annually until 1967, except for 1965. The event was revived in 1974 as the Coca-Cola Lakes Open. Ferrier won for the third time in 1948, a feat later matched by Eric Cremin, Kel Nagle and Frank Phillips.

== Winners ==
Year	Winner	Country	Score	To par	Margin of victory	Runner(s)-up	Ref
1934	Craig Wood	United States	283	−5	4 strokes	(United States) Paul Runyan	
1935	Fred Bolger	Australia	284	−4	5 strokes	(Australia) Jim Ferrier (a)	
1936	Jim Ferrier (a)	Australia	281	−7	9 strokes	(Australia) Billy Bolger	
1937	Jim Ferrier (a)	Australia	297	+9	1 stroke	(Australia) Bill Holder	
1938	Norman Von Nida	Australia	277	−11	6 strokes	(Australia) Jim Ferrier (a)	
1939	Norman Von Nida	Australia	292	+4	Playoff	(Australia) Billy Bolger	
1940–1946: No tournament
1947	Ossie Pickworth	Australia	291	+3	2 strokes	(Australia) Eric Cremin	
1948	Jim Ferrier	Australia	283	−5	4 strokes	(Australia) Eric Cremin	
1949	Eric Cremin	Australia	287	−1	3 strokes	(Australia) Norman Von Nida	
1950	Eric Cremin	Australia	293	+5	4 strokes	(Australia) Kel Nagle	
1951	Ted Naismith	Australia	296	+8	4 strokes	(Australia) Jack Barkel (a) (Australia) Jim Moran	
1952	Jimmy Adams	Scotland	307	+19	4 strokes	(Australia) Eric Cremin (Australia) Kel Nagle	
1953	Eric Cremin	Australia	296	+8	3 strokes	(Australia) Dan Cullen (Australia) Frank Phillips	
1954	Kel Nagle	Australia	282	−6	8 strokes	(Australia) Ted Rigney (a)	
1955	Les Wilson	Australia	296	+8	1 strokes	(Australia) Mick Kelly (Australia) Jim McInnes	
1956	Harry Berwick (a)	Australia	305	+17	3 strokes	(Australia) Billy Bolger (Australia) Eric Cremin	
1957	Kel Nagle	Australia	289	+1	1 stroke	(Australia) Bill Holder	
1958	Kel Nagle	Australia	290	+2	1 stroke	(Australia) Bruce Devlin (a)	
1959	Frank Phillips	Australia	290	+2	3 strokes	(Australia) Kel Nagle (Australia) Len Woodward	
1960	Frank Phillips	Australia	291	+3	4 strokes	(Australia) Alan Murray	
1961	Phil Billings (a)	Australia	280	−8	8 strokes	(Australia) Bill See Hoe	
1962	Les Wilson	Australia	282	−6	3 strokes	(Australia) Phil Billings (a)	
1963	Peter Thomson	Australia	288	E	2 strokes	(Australia) Bob Swinbourne	
1964	Ted Ball	Australia	279	−9	2 strokes	(Australia) Les Wilson	
1965: No tournament
1966	Frank Phillips	Australia	280	−8	7 strokes	(Australia) Alan Murray	
1967	Bruce Devlin	Australia	287	−1	1 stroke	(Australia) Ted Ball (Australia) Jim Moran	
1968–1973: No tournament
Coca-Cola Lakes Open
1974	Bob Shearer	Australia	297	+5	Playoff	(Australia) Ted Ball (Australia) Paul Murray	

In 1939 there was an 18-hole playoff a week later. Von Nida scored to 74 to Bulger's 75. In 1974 Shearer won with a birdie at the first extra hole.
