= Hugh Ferguson =

Hugh Ferguson is the name of:

- Hugh Ferguson (footballer, born 1895), Scottish footballer for Motherwell and Dundee
- Hugh Ferguson (footballer, born 1926), Northern Irish footballer for Bradford City and Halifax Town
- Hugh Ferguson (politician), Scottish politician
