= Fergus McMahon =

Australian professional golfer

Personal information
- Full name: Fergus William McMahon
- Nationality: Australia
- Born: 1898 Adelaide, South Australia
- Died: 28 August 1941 (aged 42) Adelaide, South Australia

Career
- Sport: Golf
- Turned professional: 1926

Fergus William McMahon (1898 – 28 August 1941) was an Australian professional golfer. He won the 1935 Australian Open at Royal Adelaide, having been the runner-up there in 1932. He also won the 1932 Australian Professional Championship at Royal Adelaide. He died in 1941, aged 42.

== Professional career ==
McMahon was an amateur at Kooyonga Golf Club in Adelaide until early 1926, giving up a position as a government surveyor to become a professional golfer. He became the professional at the newly formed Marino Golf Club in Marino, a suburb of Adelaide, later becoming an instructor at the Myer Emporium in the city. The Australian Open in 1926 was played at Royal Adelaide and McMahon finished in fifth place. A professional event was organised immediately after the Open but McMahon failed to finish in the top 4 in the qualifying stage. Soon afterwards he played in the South Australian qualifying for the Sun-Herald Tournament. He led after the first round but dropped to fourth, failing to qualify.

The South Australian Professional Championship was first played in 1927 and McMahon finished second behind Rufus Stewart. However he won the championship in 1928, 1929 and 1930, gaining permanent possession of the trophy by winning three times in succession. He would eventually win the event five times, with further victories in 1934 and 1937. He was also runner-up five times, the last time in 1940.

The Australian Open was played at Royal Adelaide again in 1929 and McMahon improved on his previous best, finishing fourth. When it returned to Royal Adelaide in 1932 he improved again, finishing runner-up and leading professional, a stroke behind Mick Ryan. He then won the Australian Professional Championship which followed the Open, beating George Naismith 7&6 in the final. In 1935 he won the Australian Open, again when it was Royal Adelaide, beating Jim Ferrier by a stroke.

McMahon won the South Australian Close Championship four times, in 1933, 1936, 1937 and 1938 and the South Australian Dunlop Cup in 1935, 1936 and 1937.

== Later life ==
McMahon died in Royal Adelaide Hospital on 28 August 1941, aged 42, following an operation. A testimonial was organised for his family.

== Professional wins ==
- 1928 South Australian Professional Championship
- 1929 South Australian Professional Championship
- 1930 South Australian Professional Championship
- 1932 Australian Professional Championship
- 1933 South Australian Close Championship
- 1934 South Australian Professional Championship
- 1935 Dunlop Cup (South Australia), Australian Open
- 1936 Dunlop Cup (South Australia), South Australian Close Championship
- 1937 Dunlop Cup (South Australia), South Australian Close Championship, South Australian Professional Championship
- 1938 South Australian Close Championship

== Team appearances ==
- Vicars Shield (representing South Australia): 1930 (winners), 1931 (winners), 1932, 1933, 1935 (winners), 1936, 1938
