= Lou Kelly =

Australian professional golfer

Personal information
- Full name: Michael Louis Kelly
- Nationality: Australia
- Born: 30 July 1913 Wellington, New South Wales, Australia
- Died: 2 April 1971 (aged 57) Sydney, New South Wales, Australia

Career
- Sport: Golf
- Status: Professional

Michael Louis Kelly (30 July 1913 – 2 April 1971) was an Australian professional golfer. He won the Australian Open in 1933 and the Australian Professional Championship in 1934.

== Early life ==
Kelly was born in Wellington, New South Wales on 30 July 1913. After being a caddie in the Sydney area, the family moved to Canberra and Kelly became an assistant professional at Royal Canberra Golf Club. In 1931, after five years at Canberra, he left to become the professional at Goulburn Golf Club.

== Professional career ==
Kelly won the inaugural New South Wales Assistants' Championship at Concord in 1931, shortly before leaving Canberra. In 1932 he impressed by reaching the semi-final of the New South Wales Professional Championship.

Aged just 20, Kelly was a surprise winner of the 1933 Australian Open at Royal Melbourne. After the first day he led by 3 strokes after a round of 73, a lead he maintained after a second round of 76. A 73 on the final morning increased his lead to 6 strokes and he finished with a round of 80, to win by 3 strokes from the amateurs Jim Ferrier and Gus Jackson and professional Reg Jupp. The following week he reached the semi-finals of the Australian Professional Championship before losing to Sam Richardson. Kelly failed to successfully defend his Australian Open title in 1934, finishing 22 strokes behind the winner, Billy Bolger. He was, however, in the top 16 professionals that qualified for the Australian Professional Championship. He met Bolger in the final, winning a close match 2&1. Later in 1934 he was runner-up in the New South Wales Professional Championship, 6 strokes behind Sam Richardson.

Kelly had further success in 1935, winning the New South Wales Dunlop Cup. He had rounds of 70 and 71 on the final day to win by a stroke from Billy Bolger and Tom Howard.

In early 1936 Kelly was one of the six-man Australian team in the second Lakes International Cup at Lakewood Country Club, Long Beach, California. He was the only Australian to win a match, beating the reigning U.S. Open champion, Sam Parks Jr., in the singles. He had been selected for the 1934 team but had declined, having a previous arrangement.

== Later life ==
Kelly left Goulburn in early 1934, joining Alan Kippax's sports store in Sydney. In 1938 he was associated with St Michael's Golf Club and from 1939 with Bexley Golf Club, where he stayed until his death in 1971. Kelly's brother Pat was also a professional at Goulburn, from 1937.

== Professional wins ==
- 1933 Australian Open
- 1934 Australian Professional Championship
- 1935 Dunlop Cup (New South Wales)

== Team appearances ==
- Lakes International Cup (representing Australia): 1936
- Vicars Shield (representing New South Wales): 1934 (winners), 1935, 1937 (winners), 1946 (winners), 1948 (winners)
