= McWilliam's Wines Tournament =

Tournament information
- Location: Australia
- Established: 1949
- Course(s): The Australian Golf Club
- Final year: 1953

Final champion
- Kel Nagle

The McWilliam's Wines Tournament was a golf tournament held in Australia from 1949 to 1953, played at The Australian Golf Club. Norman Von Nida won the event three of the five times it was contested. Total prize money was £2,500, increasing to £5,000 for the final event in 1953. The sponsor was McWilliam's Wines, an Australian wine producer.

== Winners ==
Year	Winner	Country	Score	Margin of victory	Runner-up	Winner's share (A£)	Ref
1949	Norman Von Nida	Australia	281	6 strokes	(Australia) Ossie Pickworth	600	
1950	Eric Cremin	Australia	283	2 strokes	(Wales) Dai Rees	600	
1951	Norman Von Nida (2)	Australia	289	4 strokes	(Australia) Ossie Pickworth	600	
1952	Norman Von Nida (3)	Australia	281	2 strokes	(Australia) Ossie Pickworth	600	
1953	Kel Nagle	Australia	277	7 strokes	(Argentina) Roberto De Vicenzo	1,100	
