= Rufus Stewart =

Australian professional golfer

Personal information
- Full name: William Rufus Clyde Stewart
- Nationality: Australia
- Born: 27 September 1893 Alberton, South Australia
- Died: 23 April 1964 (aged 70) Adelaide, South Australia

Career
- Sport: Golf
- Status: Professional

Best results in major championships
- Masters Tournament: DNP
- PGA Championship: DNP
- U.S. Open: CUT: 1928
- The Open Championship: T37: 1928

William Rufus Clyde Stewart (27 September 1893 – 23 April 1964) was an Australian professional golfer. He won the 1927 Australian Open and the 1929 Australian Professional Championship. In 1928 he travelled to Britain and America, playing in the Open Championship and the U.S. Open. He also travelled to Europe in 1931, again playing in the Open Championship.

== Early life ==
Stewart was born in Alberton, South Australia but when he was young the family moved to Seaton. Adelaide Golf Club moved near to where he lived in 1906 and Stewart became a caddie at the club. Stewart was initially associated with Adelaide Golf Club but later became the professional at the old Glenelg Golf Club, at North Adelaide Golf Course and then the first professional at Kooyonga Golf Club, which opened in 1923.

== Professional career ==
Stewart played in his first Australian Open in September 1909, at Royal Melbourne. He finished 36 strokes behind the winner but was the second South Australian, 4 strokes behind James Scott, the Adelaide professional. The 1910 Open was held at Stewart's home club, Adelaide Golf Club, the first time it had been held in South Australia. A 36-hole event for professionals was held on the day before the Open started, Stewart finishing second behind Dan Soutar. In the Open itself he finished tied for 8th place, the third professional and the leading South Australian. Stewart didn't travel to Sydney for 1911 Open but played again at Royal Melbourne in 1912. He was third after the first day but finished in a tie for 7th place. The 1913 Open was again played at Royal Melbourne. Stewart was tied for second place after the first day. He needed a 5 at the final hole to finish third and take the £10 prize as the leading professional. However he took 9 and finished 6th, 3 strokes behind Dan Soutar. Two 36-hole professional events were played on the Royal Melbourne course after the Open, Stewart finishing joint runner-up in the first and runner-up in the second, behind Soutar on both occasions.

Stewart resumed his playing career after World War I. He finished tied for 6th place in the 1920 Australian Open, tied for 4th place in 1921, 6th in 1923 when it returned to Adelaide and 5th in 1925. He also reached the final of the professional tournament played after the 1923 Open, losing to Fred Popplewell. In 1924 he qualified as the South Australian representative in the Sun Tournament in Sydney, although he lost to Walter Clark in the first round. 1926 saw him come closer to success. He was runner-up and the leading professional in the Australian Open, and then lost in the semi-final of the professional tournament to Ted Smith, at the fifth extra hole. Later in the year he was joint runner-up, behind Smith, in the Victorian Professional Championship.

Stewart had his biggest success in 1927, winning the Australian Open at Royal Melbourne. Harry Sinclair led after the first day with Stewart one of four players in second place, 3 strokes behind. Stewart had a third round of 72, to Sinclair's 78, to lead the field, and a final round of 75 gave him victory by 2 strokes from Sinclair. Later in the year he won the inaugural South Australian Professional Championship, 5 strokes ahead of Fergus McMahon.

Following his Australian Open win, Stewart was sponsored to play in the 1928 Open Championship at Royal St George's. He was accompanied by Howard Brown who acted as his manager. Brown was the owner of Brown Brothers, a chair manufacturer. They arrived in Britain in early-April and left for America in early-June. Stewart's first event was the Roehampton Invitation Tournament, where he failed to reach the match-play stage. The Open Championship was played from 9 to 11 May with qualifying on 7 and 8 May. 113 players qualified with Stewart tying for 6th place. In the championship itself he had rounds of 79 and 75 to make the cut. However, on the final day he had rounds of 82 and 79 and finished tied for 37th place. He then played in the Yorkshire Evening News Tournament where he qualified for the match-play stage but lost in the last-16. He then played in the Irish Open at Royal County Down at the end of May, finishing with a score of 313. After travelling to the United States, he played in the 1928 U.S. Open at Olympia Fields near Chicago, scoring 80 and 83 and missing the cut. He then competed in the Mid-American Open at Lakewood Golf Club in Kansas City at the end of June, finishing in 13th place, and returned to Australia in mid-August.

The 1928 Australian Open was played in early-September at Royal Sydney. Stewart started with a 78 but recovered to finish runner-up, a stroke behind Fred Popplewell. Later in 1928 he lost in the final of the South Australian Professional Championship to Fergus McMahon but won the Victorian Professional Championship, two ahead of Billy Bolger. Stewart continued his good form in 1929. He reached the final of the Victorian Professional Championship, but lost 6&5 to Reg Jupp. He made a bad start in the Australian Open at Royal Adelaide, but recovered to finish joint runner-up behind Ivo Whitton, as he had been in 1926. The following week he won the Australian Professional Championship beating Ernie Bissett 8&7 in the final. Later in the year he again lost the final of the South Australian Professional Championship to McMahon. In 1930, Stewart was again runner-up in the Australian Open, the fifth year in a row that he was either winner or a runner-up. The following week he was again runner-up, losing in the final of the Australian Professional Championship.

In 1931 Stewart won the Spalding Australian Professional Overseas Championship, the main prize being an expenses-paid trip to play in the 1931 Open Championship at Carnoustie. He won the South Australian 72-hole qualifying stage at Kooyonga in late-February by 15 strokes with a score of 287. The final stage was at Victoria Golf Club in mid-March with the five state winners competing over 72 holes. Stewart won by 6 strokes from George Naismith, the Victorian representative. Stewart left Australia in early-April, arriving in England in early-May. He played in the Dunlop-Southport Tournament, where he finished with a score of 311, and then the Yorkshire Evening News Tournament, where failed to qualify for the match-play stage. He then played in an unusual "approaching and putting championship", finishing 9 strokes behind the winner. As in 1928, Stewart successfully qualified for the Open Championship and made the cut, finishing with a score of 315, in a tie for 47th place. He left England in mid-June after playing in the French Open and returned to Adelaide in late-July.

Stewart continued to win in South Australia, eventually winning the South Australian Professional Championship six times. He also won the South Australian Close Championship in 1934 and the South Australian Dunlop Cup twice. In 1934 he was selected as one of the six-man Australian team to play the United States in the inaugural Lakes International Cup. The Australians lost heavily, losing all 9 matches.

== Later life ==
Stewart retired as professional at Kooyonga in the late 1940s, being replaced by Jim Mills. A testimonial was organised for him in 1946 and 1947. He died on 23 April 1964.

== Professional wins ==
- 1927 Australian Open, South Australian Professional Championship
- 1928 Victorian Professional Championship
- 1929 Australian Professional Championship
- 1931 Spalding Australian Professional Overseas Championship, South Australian Professional Championship
- 1934 South Australian Close Championship
- 1935 South Australian Professional Championship
- 1936 South Australian Professional Championship
- 1939 South Australian Professional Championship
- 1940 Dunlop Cup (South Australia)
- 1941 Dunlop Cup (South Australia), South Australian Professional Championship

== Results in major championships ==
Tournament	1928	1929	1930	1931
U.S. Open	CUT			
The Open Championship	T37			T47

Note: Stewart only played in The Open Championship and the U.S. Open.

Did not play

CUT = missed the half-way cut
"T" indicates a tie for a place

== Team appearances ==
- Lakes International Cup (representing Australia): 1934
- Vicars Shield (representing South Australia): 1930 (winners), 1931 (winners), 1932, 1933, 1935 (winners), 1936, 1937, 1938, 1939, 1946
