= Adelaide Advertiser Tournament =

Golf tournament played in South Australia

Tournament information
- Location: Adelaide, Australia
- Established: 1948
- Final year: 1967

Final champion
- Bob Stanton

The Adelaide Advertiser Tournament was a golf event played in Adelaide, Australia, between 1948 and 1967. Up to 1960 the event was played in March or April but was later played in September or October. The venue generally alternated between Royal Adelaide Golf Club and Kooyonga Golf Club. Prize money was £500 from 1948 to 1952, £1,000 from 1953 to 1964, £1,500 in 1965 and A$3,000 in 1966 and 1967.

== Adelaide Advertiser Special Tournament ==
An extra event was played in October 1952 called the Adelaide Advertiser Special Tournament with prize money of £1,000. It was played at Kooyonga Golf Club with a first prize of £350. The tournament was organised because of the visit of a team of four American golfers; Jimmy Demaret, Lloyd Mangrum, Ed Oliver and Jim Turnesa. Mangrum won with a 36-hole score of 137, four strokes ahead of Oliver.

== Winners ==
Year	Winner	Country	Venue	Score	Margin of victory	Runner(s)-up	Winner's share (A£)	Ref
1948	Ossie Pickworth	Australia	Royal Adelaide Golf Club	287	2 strokes	(Australia) Eric Cremin		
1949	Norman Von Nida	Australia	Kooyonga Golf Club	284	4 strokes	(Australia) Eric Cremin		
1950	Eric Cremin	Australia	Royal Adelaide Golf Club	284	1 stroke	(Wales) Dai Rees		
1951	Eric Cremin (2)	Australia	Kooyonga Golf Club	281	1 stroke	(Australia) Ossie Pickworth		
1952	Jack Harris	Australia	Royal Adelaide Golf Club	285	2 strokes	(Australia) Kel Nagle		
1953	Kel Nagle	Australia	Royal Adelaide Golf Club	279	1 stroke	(Australia) Ossie Pickworth		
1954 and 1955: No tournament
1956	Bill Shephard (a)	Australia	Kooyonga Golf Club	211	5 strokes	(Australia) Sid Cowling (Australia) Eric Cremin (Australia) Ossie Pickworth (Australia) Len Woodward		
1957	Murray Crafter	Australia	Royal Adelaide Golf Club	282	4 strokes	(Australia) Sid Cowling		
1958	Kel Nagle (2)	Australia	Kooyonga Golf Club	279	1 stroke	(Australia) Murray Crafter		
1959	Murray Crafter (2)	Australia	Royal Adelaide Golf Club	281	2 strokes	(Australia) Kel Nagle		
1960	Eric Cremin (3)	Australia	Kooyonga Golf Club	288	1 stroke	(Australia) Frank Phillips		
1961	Peter Thomson	Australia	Royal Adelaide Golf Club	286	1 stroke	(Australia) Eric Cremin		
1962	Kel Nagle (3)	Australia	Kooyonga Golf Club	280	6 strokes	(Australia) Peter Thomson		
1963	Bruce Devlin; Frank Phillips	Australia; Australia	Royal Adelaide Golf Club	282	Tied			
1964	Frank Phillips (2)	Australia	Kooyonga Golf Club	285	1 stroke	(Australia) Brian Crafter (New Zealand) Walter Godfrey		
1965	Bob Stanton	Australia	Royal Adelaide Golf Club	291	1 stroke	(Australia) Frank Phillips (Australia) John Sullivan	350	
1966	Brian Crafter	Australia	Kooyonga Golf Club	275	4 strokes	(Australia) Kel Nagle (Australia) Frank Phillips	A$700	
1967	Bob Stanton (2)	Australia	Royal Adelaide Golf Club	291	9 strokes	(Australia) Bob Shaw	A$700	
