= West End Tournament =

Tournament information
- Location: Victor Harbor, South Australia
- Established: 1962
- Course(s): Victor Harbor Golf Club
- Final year: 1974

Final champion
- Kel Nagle

The West End Tournament was a golf tournament held in Australia from 1962 to 1974. The events were held at Victor Harbor Golf Club, Victor Harbor, South Australia. Kel Nagle won the event five times between 1966 and 1974. The event was sponsored by the South Australian Brewing Company, brewers of West End Draught. Total prize money was A£500 in 1962, A£1,000 in 1963 and 1964, A£1,500 in 1965, A$3,000 in 1966 and 1967, A$4,000 from 1968 to 1970, A$5,000 in 1971 and 1972 and A$7,000 in 1973 and 1974.

== Winners ==
Year	Winner	Country	Score	Margin of victory	Runner(s)-up	Ref
1962	Frank Phillips	Australia	138	3 strokes	(Australia) Len Woodward	
1963	Len Thomas	Australia	272	2 strokes	(Australia) John Sullivan (Australia) Peter Thomson	
1964	Walter Godfrey; Frank Phillips (2)	New Zealand; Australia	280	Tie		
1965	John Sullivan	Australia	278	2 strokes	(Australia) Ted Ball (Australia) Alan Murray (Australia) Bob Stanton	
1966	Murray Crafter; Kel Nagle	Australia; Australia	274	Tie		
1967	Kel Nagle (2)	Australia	274	3 strokes	(New Zealand) Walter Godfrey (Australia) Bob Stanton (Australia) Tim Woolbank	
1968	Kel Nagle (3)	Australia	279	1 stroke	(Australia) Peter Harvey (Australia) Stan Peach	
1969	Guy Wolstenholme	England	274	5 strokes	(New Zealand) Terry Kendall	
1970	Frank Phillips (3)	Australia	277	1 stroke	(United States) Jerry Stolhand	
1971	Walter Godfrey (2)	New Zealand	276	5 strokes	(Australia) Bob Tuohy (Australia) Randall Vines	
1972	Kel Nagle (4)	Australia	275	4 strokes	(New Zealand) Walter Godfrey	
1973	David Galloway	Australia	276	2 strokes	(Australia) Randall Vines	
1974	Kel Nagle (5)	Australia	281	1 stroke	(Australia) Tom Linskey (Australia) Rob McNaughton	

The 1962 event was played over 36 holes.
