= George Naismith =

Australian professional golfer

Personal information
- Full name: George William Naismith
- Nationality: Australia
- Born: 1909 Melbourne, Victoria, Australia
- Died: 23 May 1983 (aged 74) Melbourne, Victoria, Australia

Career
- Sport: Golf
- Status: Professional

George William Naismith (1909 – 23 May 1983) was an Australian professional golfer. He won the 1937 Australian Open.

== Early life ==
Naismith was initially an assistant professional at Kingston Heath Golf Club. In 1929 he was appointed the professional at Riversdale Golf Club.

== Professional career ==
Naismith first came to notice in the 1927 Australian Open when, after three mediocre rounds, he finished with a round of 72. In 1928 he reached the semi-finals of the Age and Leader purse, only losing at the 20th hole.

In 1931 Naismith qualified as the Victorian representative in the Spalding Australian Professional Overseas Championship, the main prize for which was an expenses-paid trip to play in the 1931 Open Championship at Carnoustie. In the Victorian qualifying event, Naismith and John Young were tied on 316 after 72 holes but Naismith won the 18-hole playoff the following day by 10 strokes. The final stage was at Victoria Golf Club in mid-March with the five state winners competing over 72 holes. Naismith was runner-up, 6 strokes behind South Australian, Rufus Stewart.

Naismith reached the final of the 1932 Australian Professional Championship at Royal Adelaide, losing 7&6 to Fergus McMahon. Two weeks later he won the Victorian Professional Championship at Royal Melbourne beating Horace Boorer 5&4 in the final. He won again in 1934 at Kingston Heath, beating Boorer again in the final, this time 9&8. In early 1936 Naismith was one of the six-man Australian team in the second Lakes International Cup at Lakewood Country Club, Long Beach, California. Playing with his cousin, Ted Naismith, they lost in the foursomes but George halved his singles against Paul Runyan.

Naismith's biggest success came in 1937 when he won the Australian Open at The Australian Golf Club. After two rounds Rufus Stewart led from Jim Ferrier with Naismith tied in third place. Both Stewart and Ferrier did badly on the final day and, with two rounds of 74, Naismith won with a score of 299, one ahead of amateurs, Doug Davies and Tom McKay, and professional Ossie Walker.

Naismith reached the final of the Australian Professional Championship for the second time in 1939, at Royal Melbourne, losing 7&5 to Ted Naismith. In 1947 the Victorian Golf Association ran a 36-hole "open scratch event", open to amateurs and professionals resident in Victoria, the forerunner of the Victorian Close Championship which started the following year. It was played on a single day at Victoria Golf Club. Naismith and amateur Bill Higgins tied with scores of 149.

== Later life ==
Naismith resigned from Riversdale Golf Club in late 1962, having been the professional there for over 33 years. He took up a position at the Melbourne Sports Depot in 1963. Naismith died in Melbourne, Victoria on 23 May 1983.

== Professional wins ==
- 1932 Victorian Professional Championship
- 1934 Victorian Professional Championship
- 1937 Australian Open

== Team appearances ==
- Lakes International Cup (representing Australia): 1936
- Vicars Shield (representing Victoria): 1930, 1931, 1932 (winners), 1933, 1934, 1935, 1936, 1937, 1938, 1939 (winners), 1946, 1949, 1950, 1952 (winners)
