= The Lakes Golf Club =

Golf course in Sydney, Australia

Club information
- Location: Eastlakes, Sydney, New South Wales, Australia
- Established: 1928
- Type: Private
- Tournaments: Australian Open
- Website: thelakesgolfclub.com.au

The Lakes Golf Club is an Australian golf course, located in the Sydney suburb of Eastlakes in New South Wales. Founded in 1928, this private golf course is approximately a 10-minute drive from Sydney central business district. The course, designed by Mike Clayton (now Ogilvy Clayton Cocking Mead) had a waiting list for full seven-day playing members and attracted a joining fee of A$33,000 in 2012.

The course has hosted the Australian Open seven times, most recently in 2018. The first two events were won by legends Jack Nicklaus and Greg Norman. The event also hosted the 1973 Chrysler Classic, an official event on the Australasian Tour, which was won by Lee Trevino.

== Tournaments hosted ==
The Lakes has hosted the Australian Open on seven occasions.

- 1964 (United States) Jack Nicklaus
- 1980 (Australia) Greg Norman
- 1992 (Australia) Steve Elkington
- 2010 (Australia) Geoff Ogilvy
- 2011 (Australia) Greg Chalmers
- 2012 (Australia) Peter Senior
- 2018 (Mexico) Abraham Ancer

It has hosted other events including the Australian PGA Championship, Ampol Tournament, Wills Classic, Wills Masters, Chrysler Classic, Johnnie Walker Australian Classic, Greg Norman Holden International and the ANZ Championship.

The club also organised the Lakes Open between 1934 and 1974 and hosted the Lakes International Cup between 1934 and 1954.

== See also ==
- List of links golf courses
