= Lakes International Cup =

Tournament information
- Established: 1934
- Format: Team match play
- Final year: 1954

Final champion
- Australia

The Lakes International Cup was a men's team golf competition between teams of professional golfers from Australia and the United States. It was played four times between 1934 and 1954. The United States won the first three matches with Australia winning the final match in 1954. The Lakes Golf Club in Sydney staged the inaugural contest in 1934, donating the trophy, and hosted the final stage of the 1952 and 1954 matches.

== Trophy ==
The original trophy had a inscribed silver base with a wooden plinth and a large bowl on top. Only the silver base survives but the bowl and plinth have been recreated.

== Format ==
The 1934 and 1936 matches were contested by teams of six players over two days with three 36-hole foursomes on the first day and six 36-hole singles matches on the second day. The 1952 and 1954 matches had teams of four players and the contest was played at two separate venues. Each half of the contest was over two days with two 36-hole foursomes on the first day and four 36-hole singles matches on the second day, the combined score over the two halves determining the winner.

== Results ==
Year	Dates	Venue	Winners	Score	Ref
1934	9–10 November	The Lakes Golf Club, Australia	United States	9–0	
1936	4–5 February	Lakewood Country Club, United States	United States	7½–1½	
1952	31 October – 1 November; 7–8 November	Huntingdale Golf Club, Australia; The Lakes Golf Club, Australia	United States	7–5	
1954	30–31 October; 5–6 November	Lake Karrinyup Country Club, Australia; The Lakes Golf Club, Australia	Australia	7–5	

== Appearances ==
The following are those who played in at least one of the four matches.

=== Australia ===
- Billy Bolger 1934, 1936
- Joe Cohen 1934, 1936
- Lou Kelly 1936
- Jim McInnes 1954
- Kel Nagle 1952, 1954
- George Naismith 1936
- Ted Naismith 1934, 1936
- Sam Richardson 1934, 1936
- Ossie Pickworth 1952, 1954
- Don Spence 1934
- Rufus Stewart 1934
- Peter Thomson 1952
- Norman Von Nida 1952, 1954

=== United States ===
- Tommy Bolt 1954
- Harry Cooper 1934, 1936
- Jimmy Demaret 1952
- Leo Diegel 1934
- Dave Douglas 1954
- Olin Dutra 1936
- Marty Furgol 1954
- Dutch Harrison 1954
- Ky Laffoon 1934
- Lloyd Mangrum 1952
- Ed Oliver 1952
- Sam Parks Jr. 1936
- Henry Picard 1936
- Paul Runyan 1934, 1936
- Denny Shute 1934
- Horton Smith 1936
- Jim Turnesa 1952
- Craig Wood 1934

In 1954 Ed Furgol was part of the original team of four but withdrew because an injured right arm. He was replaced by Dave Douglas, who flew out as a replacement, arriving in Sydney on 26 October.
