= Hugh Ferguson (footballer, born 1926) =

Northern Ireland footballer (1926–1994)

Personal information
- Full name: Hubert Ferguson
- Date of birth: 23 May 1926
- Place of birth: Belfast, Northern Ireland
- Date of death: July 1994 (aged 68)
- Place of death: Dewsbury, England
- Position: Full back

Senior career*
Years	Team	Apps	(Gls)
- Belfast Celtic
- Ballymena United
1948–1952	Bradford City	132	(0)
1952–1954	Frickley Colliery		
1954–1958	Halifax Town	95	(0)
Total		227+	(0+)
- * Club domestic league appearances and goals

Hubert Ferguson (23 May 1926 – July 1994) was a Northern Irish professional footballer who played as a full back.

== Career ==
After playing in his native Northern Ireland for Belfast Celtic and Ballymena United, Ferguson moved to England to play with Bradford City. After making 132 appearances in the Football League between 1948 and 1952, Ferguson then played non-league football with Frickley Colliery, but returned to league football in 1954 with Halifax Town. In total he made 227 appearances in the Football League.
