= Frank Phillips (golfer) =

Australian professional golfer (1932–2023)

Frank Phillips OAM
Personal information
- Full name: Frank Stafford Phillips
- Nationality: Australia
- Born: 24 July 1932 Moss Vale, New South Wales, Australia
- Died: 2 May 2023 (aged 90) Bowral, New South Wales, Australia

Career
- Sport: Golf
- Status: Professional
- Former tours: PGA Tour of Australasia; Asia Golf Circuit
- Professional wins: 38

Best results in major championships
- Masters Tournament: CUT: 1958, 1962
- PGA Championship: DNP
- U.S. Open: CUT: 1962
- The Open Championship: 12th: 1964

Frank Stafford Phillips OAM (24 July 1932 – 2 May 2023) was an Australian professional golfer.

== Career ==
Phillips was born in Moss Vale, New South Wales on 24 July 1932. In Jack Pollard's book, Australian Golf: The Game and the Players, Phillips is described as "a tall Sydney professional who built an outstanding record in Australian golf in the 1950s and 1960s."

He was rated one of the best ball strikers of his era winning the 1957 and 1961 Australian Opens.

== Personal life ==
Phillips died at a nursing home in Bowral on 2 May 2023, at the age of 90.

== Awards and honors ==
- In 2002, Phillips became a Life Member of the PGA of Australia.
- In 2017, Phillips was awarded the Medal of the Order of Australia (OAM) in the 2017 Queen's Birthday Honours for service to golf.

== Professional wins (38) ==
=== Asia Golf Circuit wins (5) ===
No.	Date	Tournament	Winning score	Margin of victory	Runner(s)-up
1	25 Feb 1962	Malayan Open	−20 (71-71-64-70=276)	1 stroke	(New Zealand) Bob Charles, (Australia) Peter Thomson
2	7 Mar 1965	Singapore Open	−13 (72-70-71-66=279)	2 strokes	(Japan) Tadashi Kitta
3	4 Apr 1965	Yomiuri International	E (72-73-74-69=288)	1 stroke	(Taiwan) Chen Ching-Po
4	27 Mar 1966	Hong Kong Open	−5 (69-66-68-72=275)	2 strokes	(Japan) Hideyo Sugimoto
5	4 Mar 1973	Hong Kong Open (2)	−6 (74-69-68-67=278)	1 stroke	(Philippines) Ben Arda

=== Australia and New Zealand wins (29) ===
- 1955 New Zealand PGA Championship
- 1956 New South Wales Close
- 1957 New South Wales PGA, Australian Open
- 1959 Lakes Open, ACT Open
- 1960 New South Wales Open, ACT Open, Lakes Open, Standard-Triumph Tournament, North Coast Open
- 1961 Australian Open
- 1962 New South Wales Open, Tasmanian Open, North Coast Open, West End Tournament
- 1963 Adelaide Advertiser Tournament (tie with Bruce Devlin)
- 1964 Victorian Open, Adelaide Advertiser Tournament, West End Tournament (tie with Walter Godfrey)
- 1966 New South Wales Open, Victorian Open, Lakes Open
- 1967 Aeron Tournament
- 1969 Aeron Tournament
- 1970 New South Wales Open, West End Tournament
- 1971 Tasmanian Open
- 1976 Ben Guzzardi Classic

=== European circuit wins (1) ===
- 1968 Woodlawn International Invitational

=== Other wins (3) ===
- 1960 Philippine Open
- 1961 Singapore Open
- 1975 Air New Zealand Fiji Open

== Results in major championships ==
Tournament	1956	1957	1958	1959	1960	1961	1962	1963	1964	1965	1966	1967	1968
Masters Tournament			CUT				CUT						
U.S. Open							CUT						
The Open Championship	CUT					T41		T18	12				CUT

Note: Phillips never played in the PGA Championship.

Did not play

CUT = missed the half-way cut (3rd round cut in 1968 Open Championship)
"T" = tied

== Team appearances ==
- Canada Cup (representing Australia): 1958
- Slazenger Trophy (representing British Commonwealth and Empire): 1956
- Vicars Shield (representing New South Wales): 1954 (winners), 1956 (winners)
