= Eric Cremin =

Australian professional golfer

Personal information
- Full name: Eric James Cremin
- Nationality: Australia
- Born: 15 June 1914 Mascot, New South Wales, Australia
- Died: 29 December 1973 (aged 59) Singapore

Career
- Sport: Golf
- Status: Professional
- Professional wins: 37

Best results in major championships
- Masters Tournament: DNP
- PGA Championship: DNP
- U.S. Open: DNP
- The Open Championship: 16th: 1951

Eric James Cremin (15 June 1914 – 29 December 1973) was an Australian professional golfer. Cremin won dozens of significant tournaments in Australia during his career. Later he was instrumental in the establishment of the Far East Circuit, later known as the Asia Golf Circuit.

== Career ==
Cremin was born in Mascot, New South Wales.

Cremin played mostly in Australasia, only occasionally travelling to Europe to compete, but enjoyed great success on the Australian circuit, including victories in the 1949 Australian Open and the 1937 and 1938 Australian PGA Championship. After World War II, Cremin was runner-up in the Australian PGA Championship a further seven times, including 1946 to 1948 consecutively.

In 1959, Cremin and a Welsh international golfer, Kim Hall, established a tournament in Hong Kong to provide an additional event for the Australian professionals who were travelling to play in the Philippine Open. The Hong Kong Open was a great success, and within a few years, similar tournaments had been founded in Singapore, Malaysia, Thailand, Taiwan and Japan, and the Far East Circuit had become firmly established.

== Death ==
In 1973, Cremin died of a heart attack while playing golf in Singapore.

== Professional wins (37) ==
- 1937 Australian PGA Championship, New South Wales PGA
- 1938 Australian PGA Championship, New South Wales PGA
- 1946 ACT Open, Queensland Open, Victorian PGA Championship
- 1947 Dunlop Cup (NSW), New South Wales PGA, Victorian PGA Championship
- 1948 ACT Open, Dunlop Cup (NSW), Queensland Open
- 1949 Australian Open, New South Wales Close, Victorian PGA Championship, Western Australia Open, Lakes Open
- 1950 ACT Open, Dunlop Cup (NSW), New South Wales Close, Queensland Open, Adelaide Advertiser Tournament, McWilliam's Wines Tournament, New South Wales PGA, Lakes Open
- 1951 Dunlop Cup (NSW), Adelaide Advertiser Tournament
- 1952 ACT Open
- 1953 Lakes Open
- 1954 New South Wales PGA, Western Australian Open
- 1955 Ampol Tournament
- 1956 ACT Open, Queensland Open
- 1957 Queensland Open
- 1960 Adelaide Advertiser Tournament

== Team appearances ==
- Vicars Shield (representing New South Wales): 1937 (winners), 1938 (winners), 1939, 1946 (winners), 1947 (winners), 1948 (winners), 1949 (winners), 1950 (winners), 1951, 1952, 1953, 1954 (winners), 1955 (winners)
