= Royal Adelaide Golf Club =

Golf club in Seaton, South Australia

- Location in Australia Location in South Australia
- 34.896°S 138.51°E

Club information
- Location: Tapleys Hill Road; Seaton, South Australia
- Established: 1906, 120 years ago 1892 (club)
- Type: Private
- Tota holes: 18
- Tournaments: Australian Open; Women's Australian Open; Jacob's Creek Open Championship; Australian Amateur
- Website: royaladelaidegolf.com.au
- Designed by: H.L. Rymill, C.L. Gardner, Dr. Alister MacKenzie
- Par: 72
- Length: 6,572 m (7,187 yd)
- Course rating: 74
- Slope rating: 133

The Royal Adelaide Golf Club (often referred to as Seaton) is a private Australian golf club located in the Adelaide suburb of Seaton, 9 kilometres (5.6 mi) northwest of the city centre.

The links at Seaton has been the venue for many international and interstate matches and championships. Royal Adelaide has hosted the Australian Open nine times, most recently in 1998 when Greg Chalmers took home the trophy, carding an even-par 288. The Women's Australian Open was first played at the course in December 1994, won by Annika Sörenstam, and returned in February 2017 where it was won by Jang Ha-na. It has also hosted the Australian Amateur 19 times, the South Australian Open 13 times, and the Adelaide Advertiser Tournament 10 times.

The course record was originally established by American Marty Bohen in 1977. Bohen shot a 63 (−10) during the final round of the 1977 South Australian Open.

== Scorecard ==
| Tee | Par | Distance | Scratch Rating | Slope Rating |
|---|---|---|---|---|
| Men's (Blue) | 72 | 6572 | 74 | 133 |
| Men's (White) | 72 | 6125 | 72 | 129 |
| Ladies (Red) | 73 | 5516 | 75 | 136 |

| | Men's (Blue) | | | Men's (White) | | | Ladies (Red) | | |
| Hole | Metres | Yards | Par | Metres | Yards | Par | Metres | Yards | Par |
|---|---|---|---|---|---|---|---|---|---|
| 1 | 348 | 381 | 4 | 342 | 374 | 4 | 329 | 360 | 4 |
| 2 | 507 | 554 | 5 | 468 | 512 | 5 | 407 | 445 | 5 |
| 3 | 266 | 291 | 4 | 265 | 290 | 4 | 250 | 273 | 4 |
| 4 | 410 | 448 | 4 | 369 | 404 | 4 | 344 | 376 | 4 |
| 5 | 420 | 459 | 4 | 374 | 409 | 4 | 350 | 383 | 4 |
| 6 | 420 | 459 | 4 | 393 | 430 | 4 | 371 | 406 | 5 |
| 7 | 167 | 183 | 3 | 148 | 162 | 3 | 119 | 130 | 3 |
| 8 | 358 | 392 | 4 | 322 | 352 | 4 | 271 | 296 | 4 |
| 9 | 495 | 541 | 5 | 483 | 528 | 5 | 448 | 490 | 5 |
| Out | 3391 | 3708 | 37 | 3164 | 3460 | 37 | 2889 | 3159 | 38 |
| 10 | 345 | 377 | 4 | 334 | 365 | 4 | 287 | 314 | 4 |
| 11 | 353 | 386 | 4 | 350 | 383 | 4 | 302 | 330 | 4 |
| 12 | 205 | 224 | 3 | 201 | 220 | 3 | 151 | 165 | 3 |
| 13 | 395 | 432 | 4 | 354 | 387 | 4 | 345 | 377 | 4 |
| 14 | 445 | 487 | 4 | 382 | 418 | 4 | 327 | 358 | 4 |
| 15 | 464 | 507 | 5 | 450 | 492 | 5 | 422 | 462 | 5 |
| 16 | 165 | 180 | 3 | 156 | 171 | 3 | 130 | 142 | 3 |
| 17 | 426 | 466 | 4 | 365 | 399 | 4 | 322 | 352 | 4 |
| 18 | 383 | 419 | 4 | 369 | 404 | 4 | 341 | 373 | 4 |
| In | 3181 | 3479 | 35 | 2961 | 3238 | 35 | 2627 | 2873 | 35 |
| Total | 6572 | 7187 | 72 | 6125 | 6698 | 72 | 5516 | 6032 | 73 |

== Club history ==
The first golf club in Adelaide was founded 156 years ago in 1870 by David Murray MP, John Lindsay MP, John Gordon, J. T. Turnbull, George and Joseph Boothby and around 15 others. The Governor, Sir James Fergusson was club patron. An inaugural game of 14 holes (7 holes played twice) was played on the Adelaide Racecourse (later renamed Victoria Racecourse) on 15 May 1870, when Lindsay and John Gordon tied for first place. A nine-hole course was laid out and a greenkeeper appointed, but when Fergusson was recalled in 1873, membership in the Adelaide Golf Club declined and folded around 1876.

Royal Adelaide Golf Club was founded in August 1892 on the North Parklands. In 1906, the Golf Club was moved to land in Seaton, a northwest suburb of Adelaide. The western boundary along Frederick Road is approximately a mile (1.6 km) east of the shore of Gulf St Vincent.

== Tournaments hosted ==
=== Australian Open ===
| Year | Winner | Nationality |
|---|---|---|
| 1998 | Greg Chalmers | Australia |
| 1962 | Gary Player | South Africa |
| 1938 | Jim Ferrier | Australia |
| 1935 | Fergus McMahon | Australia |
| 1932 | Mick Ryan | Australia |
| 1929 | Ivo Whitton | Australia |
| 1926 | Ivo Whitton | Australia |
| 1923 | Tom Howard | Australia |
| 1910 | Carnegie Clark | Australia |

=== Women's Australian Open ===
| Year | Winner | Nationality |
|---|---|---|
| 2020 | Inbee Park | South Korea |
| 2017 | Jang Ha-na | South Korea |
| 1994 | Annika Sörenstam | Sweden |

=== Other tournaments ===
- 1900 Australian Amateur
- 1903 Australian Amateur
- 1910 Australian Amateur
- 1923 Australian Amateur
- 1926 Australian Amateur
- 1929 Australian Amateur
- 1932 Australian Amateur
- 1935 Australian Amateur
- 1939 Australian Amateur
- 1947 Australian Amateur
- 1948 Adelaide Advertiser Tournament
- 1950 Australian Amateur
- 1950 Adelaide Advertiser Tournament
- 1952 Adelaide Advertiser Tournament
- 1953 Adelaide Advertiser Tournament
- 1954 Australian Amateur
- 1957 Adelaide Advertiser Tournament
- 1958 Australian Amateur
- 1959 Adelaide Advertiser Tournament
- 1960 South Australian Open
- 1961 Adelaide Advertiser Tournament
- 1963 Adelaide Advertiser Tournament
- 1964 South Australian Open
- 1965 Adelaide Advertiser Tournament
- 1967 Adelaide Advertiser Tournament
- 1968 South Australian Open
- 1969 Australian Amateur
- 1975 Australian Amateur
- 1977 South Australian Open
- 1981 Australian Amateur
- 1988–1993 South Australian Open
- 1992 Australian Amateur
- 1995 South Australian Open
- 2004 Australian Amateur
- 2005 South Australian Open
- 2006 South Australian Open
- 2008 Australian Amateur
- 2008 Eisenhower Trophy

== See also ==
- List of golf clubs granted Royal status
- List of Australian organisations with royal patronage
- List of links golf courses
