= Ossie Pickworth =

Australian professional golfer (1918–1969)

Personal information
- Full name: Horace Henry Alfred Pickworth
- Nickname: Ossie
- Nationality: Australia
- Born: 17 January 1918 Sydney, New South Wales, Australia
- Died: 23 September 1969 (aged 51)

Career
- Sport: Golf
- Turned professional: 1958
- Professional wins: 37

Best results in major championships
- Masters Tournament: DNP
- PGA Championship: DNP
- U.S. Open: DNP
- The Open Championship: CUT: 1950, 1953

Horace Henry Alfred "Ossie" Pickworth (17 January 1918 – 23 September 1969) was an Australian professional golfer. He won three successive Australian Open titles from 1946 to 1948, the last of which came in a playoff against Jim Ferrier.

== Career ==
In 1918, Pickworth was born in Sydney, New South Wales.

Unlike his contemporary Jim Ferrier, who would enjoy great success on the U.S. PGA Tour, Pickworth travelled to play only infrequently, but when he did it was with some success – he played the British circuit in 1950 and finished third in the Order of Merit after winning the Irish Open, losing a three-way playoff for the Daily Mail Tournament and being runner-up in the Silver King Tournament.

Pickworth would collect a fourth Australian Open title in 1954, and was also a three-time winner of the Australian PGA Championship, in 1947, 1953 and 1955, among numerous professional victories on the Australian circuit.

== Professional wins (37) ==
this list may be incomplete

- 1946 Australian Open
- 1947 Australian Open, Australian PGA Championship, Ampol Tournament, Lakes Open, Dunlop Cup (Victoria)
- 1948 Australian Open, Victorian PGA Championship, Ampol Tournament (Apr), Ampol Tournament (Nov), Western Australian Open, Adelaide Advertiser Tournament, Victorian Close Championship, Dunlop Cup (Victoria), Peninsula £100 Pro Purse
- 1949 Ampol Tournament, Victoria Park Pro Purse, Dunlop Cup (Victoria)
- 1950 Irish Open, Victorian Close Championship, Dunlop Cup (Victoria)
- 1951 Ampol Tournament, Queensland Open, Dunlop Cup (Victoria)
- 1952 Queensland Open, Dunlop Cup (Victoria) (tie with Peter Thomson)
- 1953 Australian PGA Championship, Ampol Tournament
- 1954 Australian Open, Victorian PGA Championship, Victorian Close Championship, Liquor Industry £100 Tournament
- 1955 Australian PGA Championship, Victorian PGA Championship, Victorian Close Championship
- 1956 Victorian PGA Championship
- 1957 Victorian Open

== Results in major championships ==
Tournament	1950	1951	1952	1953
The Open Championship	CUT			CUT

Note: Pickworth only played in The Open Championship.

Did not play

CUT = missed the half-way cut

== Team appearances ==
- Canada Cup (representing Australia): 1953
- Lakes International Cup (representing Australia): 1952, 1954 (winners)
- Vicars Shield (representing New South Wales): 1946 (winners)
- Vicars Shield (representing Victoria): 1947, 1948, 1949, 1951 (winners), 1952 (winners), 1953 (winners), 1954, 1955
