= Charlie Campbell (golfer) =

Australian professional golfer

Personal information
- Nationality: Australia
- Born: c. 1890 Sydney, New South Wales, Australia

Career
- Sport: Golf
- Status: Professional
- Professional wins: 4

Charlie Campbell (born c. 1890) was an Australian professional golfer. He won the Australian Open in 1922.

== Early life ==
Campbell was born in Sydney in about 1890, later becoming a caddie at Royal Sydney Golf Club. He was an assistant to Carnegie Clark at Royal Sydney for some years before becoming the professional at Leura Golf Club in 1910. In 1911 he moved to Brisbane Golf Club but left the following year, returning to Leura. He was at Leura until 1928 when he left to become the professional at the New South Wales Golf Club in Sydney.

== Professional career ==
Campbell played in the 1911 Australian Open at Royal Sydney, finishing tied for 10th place. There was a one-day 36-hole professional event the following Wednesday which Campbell won with a score of 154. He had rounds of 80 and 74 and won by three strokes from a group of four players.

In November 1919 a number of professional events were organised in Melbourne which attracted the leading players from New South Wales and South Australia. The main event was a 72-hole handicap tournament at Royal Melbourne. Joe Kirkwood Sr. had the best gross score of 293, 17 strokes better than Campbell who had the second best score of 310. However Campbell had a handicap of +3 while Kirkwood's was +8, resulting in a win for Campbell with a net score of 322, while Kirkwood on 325 took second place. Campbell had a good performance in the 1920 Australian Open, finishing 4th, although he was 16 strokes behind the winner, Joe Kirkwood.

Campbell's biggest success came when he won the 1922 Australian Open at Royal Sydney. He had rounds of 79 and 73 on the first day to lead by three strokes from amateur Eric Quirk, with defending champion Arthur Le Fevre a further three behind. There was a three-way tie for the lead after the third round, between Campbell, Quirk and Le Fevre, after Campbell had taken 80. Campbell finished with a 75 to win the championship by three strokes from Le Fevre and six from Quirk. The professional tournament was played on the course the following week. There was a 36-hole qualifying day with the leading four playing match-play on the second day. Tom Howard led the qualifying with Campbell one of the three players tied for second place, two strokes behind. Campbell beat Carnegie Clark in the morning and then Howard in the afternoon, to win the event.

Defending his Australian Open title in 1923, Campbell finished 7th. He was two strokes behind the leaders after the first day but a third round 83 dropped him down the field and he finished 10 strokes behind the winner, Tom Howard. Later in 1923 he was runner-up in the Victorian Professional Championship, tied with Rowley Banks, but a distant 14 strokes behind the winner, Arthur Le Fevre. Campbell qualified for the 1924 Sun Tournament at Royal Sydney. He qualified as one of the seven New South Wales players, finishing in second place behind Dan Soutar after a second round 75, the best round of the day. He met Banks in the first round but lost by one hole. In the 1924 Australian Open he finished third, three strokes behind the winner Alex Russell.

Campbell finished 6th in the 1925 Australian Open at The Australian Golf Club, nine strokes behind Fred Popplewell, despite an opening round of 81. In the subsequent professional tournament he led the qualifying after rounds of 72 and 71, four ahead of Popplewell, before losing 2&1 to him in the 18-hole semi-final on the following morning. After 1925 he continued to have some good performances in the Australian Open, finishing 7th in 1927, despite a first round 80, and 5th in 1929.

== Later life ==
Campbell's 18-year-old son Jimmy won the New South Wales Assistants' Championship at the New South Wales Golf Club in 1934.

== Professional wins ==
- 1911 Australian Professional tournament
- 1919 Royal Melbourne Professional Handicap Tournament
- 1922 Australian Open, Australian Professional tournament

== Team appearances ==
- Vicars Shield (representing New South Wales): 1930, 1931, 1932
