= Sun-Herald Tournament =

Tournament information
- Location: Australia
- Established: 1924
- Final year: 1926

Final champion
- Frank Eyre

The Sun-Herald Tournament was a golf tournament held in Australia from 1924 to 1926. It was the first Australian tournament with significant prize money and was run along the lines of the British News of the World Match Play. The first event in 1924 was sponsored by The Sun newspaper in Sydney and was called the Sun Tournament. In 1925 and 1926 the events were co-sponsored by The Herald newspaper in Melbourne. The 1925 event was held in Melbourne and was called the Herald-Sun tournament while 1926 the event returned to Sydney and was called the Sun-Herald Tournament. The 1926 event was combined with the Australian Professional Championship.

== Format ==
Qualification was by a series of 36-hole stroke-play competitions; one for each state. There were a pre-determined number of qualifiers from each event. A total of 16 players qualified for the final stage with the winner determined by a knock-out competition. The final stage lasted four days, with all matches over 36 holes. There were consolation events for players losing in the early rounds.

== Prize money ==
Total prize money for each event was £500. The winner received £195 and a £5 gold medal. The losing-finalist received £100 with the losing semi-finalist each getting £40. All 16 players reaching the final stage received a minimum of £5.

== Winners ==
Year	Winner	Country	Venue	Margin of victory	Runner-up	Ref
Sun Tournament
1924	Carnegie Clark	Australia	Royal Sydney	37 holes	(Australia) Walter Clark	
Herald-Sun Tournament
1925	Tom Howard	Australia	Royal Melbourne	3 & 2	(Australia) Walter Spicer	
Sun-Herald Tournament
1926	Frank Eyre	Australia	The Australian Golf Club	6 & 5	(Australia) Arthur Le Fevre	

== 1924 Sun Tournament ==
Qualifying

Four qualifying events were held. 1 place was allocated to South Australia, 7 to Victoria, 7 to New South Wales and 1 to Queensland. One Tasmanian golfer travelled to Victoria to try to qualify.

- South Australia (7 May at Royal Adelaide Golf Club): Rufus Stewart
- Victoria (29 May at Royal Melbourne Golf Club): Rowley Banks, Ted Cates, Reg Jupp, Barney Keating, Arthur Le Fevre, Walter Spicer, Jock Young
- Queensland (8 June at Brisbane Golf Club): Arthur Spence
- New South Wales (13 June at Royal Sydney Golf Club): Charlie Campbell, Carnegie Clark, Walter Clark, Tom Howard, Les McManus, Fred Popplewell, Dan Soutar

Final stage

The final stage was played from 7 to 10 July at Royal Sydney Golf Club. The complete draw was announced on 3 July.

First round 7 July
Arthur Le Fevre
Tom Howard	3&2
Jock Young
Dan Soutar	6&4
Walter Spicer	2 up
Arthur Spence
Reg Jupp
Carnegie Clark	6&5
Ted Cates
Fred Popplewell	11&10
Rowley Banks	1 up
Charlie Campbell
Rufus Stewart
Walter Clark	3&2
Barney Keating	2&1
Les McManus

Second round 8 July
Tom Howard
Dan Soutar	2&1
Walter Spicer
Carnegie Clark	10&8
Fred Popplewell	4&3
Rowley Banks
Walter Clark	11&10
Barney Keating

Semi-finals; 9 July
Dan Soutar
Carnegie Clark	3&2
Fred Popplewell
Walter Clark	8&7

Final; 10 July
Carnegie Clark	37h
Walter Clark

The final was tied after 36 holes and went to extra holes. At the first extra hole both players were about 10 feet from the hole in two. Walter putted first and finished 9 inches from the hole. Carnegie putted next, just having room to pass Walter's ball. The putt ended on the lip of the hole, directly between Walter's ball and the hole; a "dead stymie". Walter tried to chip over Carnegie's ball but he knocked Carnegie's ball into the hole, giving Carnegie a three and winning the match.

== 1925 Herald-Sun Tournament ==
Qualifying

Two qualifying events were held. 8 places were allocated to a qualifying event in Melbourne and 8 to another in Sydney. Professionals from Queensland were included in the Sydney event, while those from South Australia and Tasmania played in Melbourne.

- Victoria (16 June at Royal Melbourne Golf Club): Walter Baldwin, Rowley Banks, Billy Iles, Barney Keating, Arthur Le Fevre, Ted Smith (Tasmania), Walter Spicer, Ernie Wood
- New South Wales (16 June at The Australian Golf Club): Walter Clark, Will Corry, Frank Eyre, Steve Holder, Tom Howard, Fred Popplewell, Dan Soutar, Don Spence

Final stage

The final stage was played from 6 to 9 July at Royal Melbourne Golf Club. The complete draw was made on 29 June.

First round 6 July
Walter Baldwin	3&2
Barney Keating
Walter Clark	1 up
Ernie Wood
Fred Popplewell	w/o
Ted Smith
Walter Spicer	4&3
Billy Iles
Don Spence
Rowley Banks	37h
Dan Soutar	6&5
Steve Holder
Will Corry
Tom Howard	1 up
Arthur Le Fevre
Frank Eyre	5&4

Second round 7 July
Walter Baldwin
Walter Clark	4&3
Fred Popplewell
Walter Spicer	3&2
Rowley Banks	6&5
Dan Soutar
Tom Howard	37h
Frank Eyre

Semi-finals; 8 July
Walter Clark
Walter Spicer	9&8
Rowley Banks
Tom Howard	7&6

Final; 9 July
Walter Spicer
Tom Howard	3&2

== 1926 Sun-Herald Tournament ==
Qualifying

Four qualifying events were held. 2 place was allocated to South Australia, 6 to Victoria, 6 to New South Wales and 2 to Queensland. Tasmanians could play in the Victorian event.

- Queensland (25 September at Royal Queensland Golf Club): Dick Carr, Arthur Spence
- Victoria (27 September at Commonwealth Golf Club): Rowley Banks, Horace Boorer, Billy Iles, Arthur Le Fevre, Ted Smith, Don Thomson
- South Australia (27 September at Royal Adelaide Golf Club): Willie Harvey, Fred McDowall
- New South Wales (28 September at Royal Sydney Golf Club): Carnegie Clark, Will Corry, Frank Eyre, Vic James, Dan Soutar, Don Spence

Final stage

The final stage was played from 18 to 21 October at the Australian Golf Club. The complete draw was announced on 6 October.

First round 18 October
Billy Iles
Ted Smith	7&6
Arthur Spence
Arthur Le Fevre	6&5
Dick Carr
Don Thomson	11&9
Dan Soutar	4&3
Vic James
Don Spence	7&5
Rowley Banks
Carnegie Clark	6&5
Fred McDowall
Frank Eyre	6&5
Willie Harvey
Horace Boorer	3&2
Will Corry

Second round 19 October
Ted Smith
Arthur Le Fevre	1 up
Don Thomson
Dan Soutar	3&2
Don Spence
Carnegie Clark	2&1
Frank Eyre	5&4
Horace Boorer

Semi-finals; 20 October
Arthur Le Fevre	2 up
Dan Soutar
Carnegie Clark
Frank Eyre	3&2

Final; 21 October
Arthur Le Fevre
Frank Eyre	6&5
