= New South Wales PGA Championship =

NSW golf championship

NSW PGA Championship
Tournament information
- Location: Cattai, New South Wales, Australia
- Established: 1923
- Course: Riverside Oaks Golf Resort
- Par: 72
- Length: 6,823 yards (6,239 m)
- Tours: PGA Tour of Australasia; Von Nida Tour
- Format: Stroke play
- Prize fund: A$110,000
- Month played: December

Tournament record score
- Aggregate: 259 Aaron Townsend (2009)
- To par: −27 Chris Downes (2003)
- Score: 13 and 11 Tom Howard (1931)

Final champion
- (Australia) Jarryd Felton
- Location in Australia Location in New South Wales

The New South Wales PGA Championship was a professional golf tournament played in New South Wales, Australia between 1923 and 2015.

== History ==
The inaugural event was held in 1923 and was won by Fred Popplewell with a score of 311. Dan Soutar had led by two strokes after the first 36 holes at The Australian Golf Club but Popplewell took a three shot lead after a third round of 74 and held on in the final round to win by a stroke. The final 36 holes were played at Royal Sydney. It was a stroke-play event again in 1924 but thereafter it was generally match-play until World War II. After the war it was a match play event in 1946 and 1950 but otherwise it was a stroke-play tournament.

From the early 1980s the event was not played as a separate event, being incorporated into other tournaments. Later it was played as a non-tour event or as part of a second-tier tour. It became a PGA Tour of Australasia event from 2009 until 2015, except for 2013 when it was not played, but has not been held since.

Kel Nagle won the event 7 times while Eric Cremin won it 5 times.

== Winners ==
Year	Tour (Note: ANZ − PGA Tour of Australasia; FT − Foundation Tour; VNT − Von Nida Tour.)	Winner	Score	To par	Margin of victory	Runner(s)-up	Venue	Ref.
NSW PGA Championship
2015	ANZ	(Australia) Jarryd Felton	275	−13	2 strokes	(Australia) Geoff Drakeford (Australia) Rhein Gibson (Australia) Matthew Millar (Australia) James Nitties (Australia) Anthony Summers	Riverside Oaks	
Nanshan NSW PGA Championship
2014	ANZ	(Australia) Lincoln Tighe	265	−19	1 stroke	(Australia) Scott Arnold	Riverside Oaks	
NSW PGA Championship
2013: No tournament
2012	ANZ	(Australia) Matt Stieger	273	−15	3 strokes	(Australia) Daniel Nisbet	Mount Broughton	
2011	ANZ	(Australia) Matthew Guyatt	197	−13	1 stroke	(Australia) Kurt Barnes (Australia) Peter O'Malley	Wollongong	
Cellarbrations NSW PGA Championship
2010	ANZ	(Australia) Steven Bowditch	263	−17	2 strokes	(New Zealand) Gareth Paddison	Wollongong	
2009	ANZ	(Australia) Aaron Townsend	259	−21	3 strokes	(Australia) Scott Arnold (Australia) Michael Wright	Wollongong	
2008	VNT	(Australia) Tim Wood	272	−16	1 stroke	(New Zealand) Michael Long	Riverside Oaks	
Riverside Oaks NSW PGA Championship
2007	VNT	(Australia) Scott Draper	268	−20	1 stroke	(Australia) Andrew Bonhomme (Australia) Aaron Townsend	Riverside Oaks	
Bega Cheese NSW PGA Championship
2006	VNT	(Australia) Paul Marantz	267	−25	4 strokes	(Australia) Michael Sim	Tura Beach	
2005	VNT	(Australia) Gavin Flint	271	−21	1 stroke	(Australia) Robin Hodgetts (Australia) Andrew Johnson	Tura Beach	
2004	VNT	(Australia) Matthew Ecob	270	−22	1 stroke	(Australia) Nathan Green (Australia) Euan Walters	Tura Beach	
2003	VNT	(Australia) Chris Downes	265	−27	8 strokes	(Australia) Matthew Ecob	Pambula	
New South Wales PGA Championship
2000–2002: No tournament
1999	FT	(Australia) Euan Walters						
1997–98: No tournament
1996	FT	(Australia) Brad King	207		2 strokes	(Australia) Paul Gow (Australia) David Elliott (Australia) Leith Wastle (Australia) Jeff Woodland	Penrith	
1995: No tournament
1994	FT	(Australia) Jeff Wagner	266		12 strokes	(Australia) David Ecob (Australia) Robert Willis	Cromer	
1991–1993: No tournament
1990		(Australia) Brett Ogle	incorporated into the Australian PGA Championship					
1989		(Australia) Peter Senior	incorporated into the Australian PGA Championship					
1988		(Australia) Wayne Grady	incorporated into the Australian PGA Championship					
1987		(Australia) Peter Senior	incorporated into the U-Bix Classic					
1986: No tournament
1985		(Australia) Wayne Riley	incorporated into the U-Bix Classic					
1984		(Australia) Peter Senior	incorporated into the Honeywell Classic					
ABE Holdings–Jack Newton Classic
1983		(Australia) Bob Shearer	284	−4	1 stroke	(Australia) Wayne Grady (Australia) Ossie Moore	Belmont	
Reschs Pilsner New South Wales PGA Championship
1982	ANZ	(New Zealand) Frank Nobilo	279	−13	1 stroke	(Australia) Lyndsay Stephen	Federal	
National Panasonic New South Wales PGA Championship
1981	ANZ	(Australia) Mike Ferguson	278	−10	2 strokes	(Australia) Brian Jones	Penrith	
1980	ANZ	(Australia) Ted Ball (2)	285	−3	1 stroke	(Australia) Wayne Grady (Australia) Lyndsay Stephen	Penrith	
Joe Jansen New South Wales PGA Championship
1979	ANZ	(Australia) Stewart Ginn	275	−13	8 strokes	(New Zealand) Richard Coombes	Penrith	
1978	ANZ	(Australia) John Clifford	266	−2	Playoff	(Australia) Ted Ball (Australia) Mike Cahill	Leonay	
New South Wales PGA Championship
1977		(Australia) Ted Ball	281	−7	Playoff	(Australia) Paul Connell	Cumberland	
1976	ANZ	(Australia) Mark Tapper	281	−7	Playoff	(United States) Marty Bohen (Australia) Brian Jones	Liverpool	
1972–1975: No tournament
1971		(Australia) Kel Nagle (7)	287	−1	4 strokes	(Australia) Vic Bennetts (Australia) Jack Newton	Mona Vale	
1970		(Australia) Bill Dunk (4)	278	−10	8 strokes	(Australia) Jack Newton	Castle Hill	
1969		(Australia) Bill Dunk (3)	284	−4	1 stroke	(Australia) John Sullivan	Castle Hill	
1968		(Australia) Bill Dunk (2)	279	−9	11 strokes	(Australia) Alan Murray	Castle Hill	
1967		(Australia) Bob Stanton	276	−12	3 strokes	(South Africa) Alan Brookes	Rugby League	
1966		(Australia) Colin McGregor	288	−4	3 strokes	(Australia) Bill Dunk	Port Kembla	
1965		(Australia) Kel Nagle (6)	283	−1	1 stroke	(Australia) Bill Dunk (Australia) Alan Murray	Ashlar	
1964		(Australia) Les Wilson	273	−7	Playoff	(Australia) Graeme Abbott	Wollongong	
1963		(Australia) Col Johnston (2)	284	E	7 strokes	(Australia) Alec Mercer	Bathurst	
1962: No tournament
New South Wales PGA Jubilee Open
1961		(Australia) Alan Murray	285	−3	2 strokes	(Australia) John Sullivan (Australia) Len Woodward	New South Wales	
New South Wales PGA Championship
1960		(Australia) Bill Dunk	267	−17	1 stroke	(Australia) Bruce Crampton (Australia) Frank Phillips	Maitland	
1959		(Australia) Kel Nagle (5)	280	E	2 strokes	(Australia) John Sullivan	Tamworth	
1958		(Australia) Col Johnston	281	+1	4 strokes	(Australia) Ian Alexander (Australia) Les Wilson	Taree	
1957		(Australia) Frank Phillips	294	+10	1 stroke	(Australia) Mick Kelly	Moss Vale	
1956		(Australia) Kel Nagle (4)	274	+2	7 strokes	(Australia) Frank Phillips	Dubbo	
1955		(Australia) Kel Nagle (3)	280	−4	3 strokes	(Australia) Eric Cremin	Pennant Hills	
1954		(Australia) Eric Cremin (5)	290	+6	1 stroke	(Australia) Jim McInnes	Pennant Hills	
1953		(Australia) Kel Nagle (2)	280	E	5 strokes	(Australia) Sam Richardson	Ryde-Parramatta	
1952		(Australia) Kel Nagle	270	−14	11 strokes	(Australia) Sam Richardson	Pennant Hills	
1951		(Australia) Norman Von Nida (4)	268	−16	14 strokes	(Australia) Eric Cremin	Goulburn	
1950		(Australia) Eric Cremin (4)	5 and 3			(Australia) Norman Von Nida	Royal Sydney	
1949		(Australia) Bill Holder	291	+7	2 strokes	(Australia) Eric Cremin (Australia) Kel Nagle	Bonnie Doon	
1948		(Australia) Norman Von Nida (3)	275	−13	7 strokes	(Australia) Eric Cremin	Royal Sydney	
1947		(Australia) Eric Cremin (3)	278	−6	9 strokes	(Australia) Dan Cullen	Waratah	
1946		(Australia) Norman Von Nida (2)	8 and 7			(Australia) Ossie Pickworth	Royal Sydney	
1941–1945: No tournament due to World War II
1940		(Australia) Billy McWilliam						
1939		(Australia) Billy Bolger (2)	5 and 4			(Australia) Norman Von Nida	Concord	
1938		(Australia) Eric Cremin (2)	12 and 10			(Australia) Norman Von Nida	The Australian	
1937		(Australia) Eric Cremin	4 and 3			(Australia) Sam Richardson	Manly	
1936		(Australia) Norman Von Nida	9 and 8			(Australia) William Mackenzie	The Australian	
1935		(Australia) Charlie Booth	288		4 strokes	(Australia) Fred Bolger	New South Wales	
1934		(Australia) Sam Richardson (2)	289		6 strokes	(Australia) Lou Kelly	Bonnie Doon	
1933		(Australia) Charlie Gray	1 up			(Australia) Billy Bolger	New South Wales	
1932		(Australia) Sam Richardson	37 holes			(Australia) Charlie Gray	The Australian	
1931		(Australia) Tom Howard (2)	13 and 11			(Australia) Don Spence	Concord	
1930		(Australia) Billy Bolger	8 and 7			(Scotland) Dan Soutar	Royal Sydney	
1929		(Australia) Fred Popplewell (2)	37 holes			(Australia) Frank Eyre	Manly	
1928		(Australia) Don Spence	4 and 3			(Australia) Arthur Spence	The Australian	
1927		(Australia) Walter Clark	4 and 2			(Australia) Harry Sinclair	Royal Sydney	
1926		(Scotland) Dan Soutar	4 and 3			(Australia) Tom Howard	The Australian	
1925		(Australia) Will Corry	2 and 1			(Australia) Carnegie Clark	Royal Sydney	
1924		(Australia) Tom Howard	297		3 strokes	(Australia) Carnegie Clark	The Australian	
1923		(Australia) Fred Popplewell	311		1 stroke	(Scotland) Dan Soutar	The Australian; Royal Sydney	
