= Tom Howard (golfer) =

Australian professional golfer

Personal information
- Full name: Thomas Ewington Howard
- Nationality: Australia
- Born: 10 November 1888 Mascot, New South Wales, Australia
- Died: 1967 (aged 78) Perth, Western Australia

Career
- Sport: Golf
- Status: Professional

Best results in major championships
- Masters Tournament: DNP
- PGA Championship: DNP
- U.S. Open: DNP
- The Open Championship: 42nd: 1926

Thomas Ewington Howard (10 November 1888 – 1967) was an Australian professional golfer. He won the Australian Open in 1923.

== Early life ==
Howard was born on 10 November 1888 at Mascot, Sydney, the second son of George and Madeline Howard. George was a gardener. Howard lost part of each index finger in a machinery accident at a rope factory.

== Amateur career ==
Howard first came to notice in 1913. Playing off a handicap of 2 he finished tied for third place in a competition marking the opening of the municipal course at Moore Park, New South Wales. Two weeks later, playing for the Bonnie Doon Golf Club, he finished 4th in qualifying for the New South Wales Amateur Championship, and reached the semi-finals, losing to Eric Apperly at the 37th hole. It was reported that he had "not played for some years." In 1914 he reached the final of the NSW Amateur, losing to Jim Howden by one hole.

In 1919 Howard won the Queensland Amateur Championship by 8 strokes and later the NSW Amateur, beating Henry McClelland by two holes in the final. In the 1920 NSW Amateur, Howard met Eric Apperly in the first match-play round and lost by one hole. In the Australian Open he finished 5th, the leading amateur. He reached the final of the Australian Amateur, but lost again to Apperly, 4 and 3. In the 1921 NSW Amateur, Howard beat his main competitors, Apperly and Ivo Whitton to reach the final, and then he outplayed Edward Pope in the final, winning 9 and 7, to win his second title. In the Australian Open, Howard tied for 6th place, and then lost in the semi-final of the amateur championship to Legh Winser, 4 and 3.

== Professional career ==
At the start of 1922 Howard gave up his amateur status, becoming the professional at Concord Golf Club in Sydney. He made a good start as a professional, winning a 36-hole open event at Royal Sydney in June. He finished 6th in the Australian Open and then reached the final of the professional tournament that followed the open, losing by one hole to the open champion Charlie Campbell. Later in the year he played in the inaugural Victorian Professional Championship, finishing runner-up, a stroke behind Dan Soutar.

Howard has his biggest success in 1923, winning the Australian Open at Royal Adelaide. Tom's elder son Albert, then aged 10, caddied for him on those three days. Four steady rounds gave him a total of 301, three ahead of Arthur Ham, an Englishman who had recently been in New Zealand. Carnegie Clark finished third while Ivo Whitton had a poor first day but recovered to finish fourth. The following week Howard reached the semi-final of the professional tournament, losing 5 and 3 to Rufus Stewart.

Defending his Australian Open title in 1924, Howard had a good first day but dropped well down the field after rounds of 83 and 89 on the final day. However he won the subsequent professional tournament, beating Arthur Le Fevre, 4 and 2, in the final. Earlier in the year he had reached quarter-finals of the Sun Tournament, losing to Dan Soutar and the following week had won the New South Wales Professional Championship, three strokes ahead of Carnegie Clark, after rounds of 71 and 73 on the final day.

In early July 1925 Howard had his biggest financial success, winning the £500 Herald-Sun Tournament at Royal Melbourne. He beat Walter Spicer in the final and took the £195 first prize and gold medal. Later in the month Howard was runner-up in the Australian Open, two behind Fred Popplewell. However, he later beat Popplewell in the final of the professional tournament, to win it for second successive year. In September he reached the final of the New South Wales Professional Championship, losing 4 and 3 to Dan Soutar.

Howard was one of group of four Australian golfers that travelled to play in the 1926 Open Championship at Royal Lytham. He went with professionals Carnegie Clark, Fred Popplewell and amateur Harry Sinclair. Only Howard and Popplewell qualified, and only Howard made the cut after two rounds of 79. He finished in 42nd place. After an extensive tour he returned in mid-September in time to play in the New South Wales Professional Championship. He reached the final, losing 4 and 3 to Dan Soutar.

From 1927 to 1929 Howard had less success in the major tournaments, although he did win the Queensland Open in 1927. Between 1930 and 1932 he had more success. In 1930 he won the inaugural New South Wales Dunlop Cup with a one-hole win over Billy Bolger. In 1931 he won the New South Wales Professional Championship for the second time, beating Don Spence, 13 and 11, in the final at Concord. The following week he was runner-up in the inaugural New South Wales Close Championship, narrowly losing a three-man playoff to Charlie Gray. Gray won the 36-hole playoff with a score of 147 (70–77), one ahead of Howard's 148 (73–75). while Sam Richardson took 80 in his first round and didn't complete the 36 holes. In 1932 he was runner-up in the Queensland Open.

After moving to Western Australia Howard won the 1938 Western Australia PGA Championship beating Dan Cullen in the final. The previous year Cullen had beaten Howard by a stroke in a 36-hole playoff after the two had tied in the Western Australian Open.

== Later life ==
Howard resigned from his position at Concord Golf Club in early 1935. He played as an unattached professional until becoming the professional at Royal Fremantle Golf Club in early 1936. Howard died in Perth, Western Australia in 1967. His brother George was a professional golfer at Katoomba and Pennant Hills Golf Club, while his brother Syd was a prominent green-keeper and involved with Castle Hill and Belmont golf clubs. Tom's elder son Al was also a professional golfer, who later became a golf course designer, early TV golf commentator and writer. Tom's other son Tom was involved with Kogarah Golf Club for many years.

== Amateur wins ==
- 1919 Queensland Amateur Championship, New South Wales Amateur Championship
- 1921 New South Wales Amateur Championship

== Professional wins ==
- 1923 Australian Open
- 1924 New South Wales Professional Championship, Australian Professional tournament
- 1925 Australian Professional tournament, Herald-Sun Tournament
- 1927 Queensland Open
- 1930 Dunlop Cup (New South Wales)
- 1931 New South Wales Professional Championship
- 1938 Western Australia PGA Championship

== Team appearances ==
Amateur

- Australian Men's Interstate Teams Matches (representing New South Wales): 1920 (winners), 1921

Professional

- Vicars Shield (representing New South Wales): 1930, 1931
- Vicars Shield (representing Western Australia): 1939, 1952
