= Fred Popplewell =

Australian professional golfer

Personal information
- Full name: Frederick Popplewell
- Nationality: Australia
- Born: 12 June 1887 Sydney, New South Wales, Australia
- Died: 5 July 1966 (aged 79) Sydney, New South Wales, Australia

Career
- Sport: Golf
- Status: Professional

Best results in major championships
- Masters Tournament: DNP
- PGA Championship: DNP
- U.S. Open: DNP
- The Open Championship: CUT: 1926

Frederick Popplewell (12 June 1887 – 5 July 1966) was an Australian professional golfer. He won the Australian Open twice, in 1925 and 1928.

== Early life ==
Popplewell became as assistant at Royal Sydney Golf Club in about 1903. He was briefly employed in Tasmania in 1905, before returning to become the professional at Newcastle Golf Club. He then took a position in a sports shop before joining Victor East at The Australian Golf Club in 1909.

== Professional career ==
Popplewell won the inaugural New South Wales Professional Championship in 1923 with a score of 311. Dan Soutar had led by two strokes after the first 36 holes at The Australian Golf Club but Popplewell took a three shot lead after a third round of 74 and held on in the final round to win by a stroke. The final 36 holes were played at Royal Sydney. Later in 1923 he won the professional tournament at the championship meeting at Royal Adelaide, beating Rufus Stewart 2&1 in the final.

In 1925 Popplewell won the Australian Open for the first time, beating Tom Howard by 2 strokes. He had led by 5 strokes after three rounds and held on to win, despite a final round 79. He won again, at Royal Sydney in 1928, winning by a stroke from Rufus Stewart.

Popplewell was one of group of four Australian professionals that travelled to play in the 1926 Open Championship at Royal Lytham. He went with Carnegie Clark, Tom Howard and Harry Sinclair. Only Howard and Popplewell qualified, Popplewell missing the cut by 3 strokes, after rounds of 81 and 80.

Popplewell won the New South Wales Professional Championship for the second time in 1929 at Manly, beating Frank Eyre at the 37th hole. Eyre had been 5 holes ahead after the morning round.

== Later life ==
Popplewell became the professional at Royal Sydney Golf Club in October 1930, retiring from there at the end of 1951, having been the professional for over 21 years. He was replaced by Jimmy Adams. Popplewell died on 5 July 1966, aged 79.

== Professional wins ==
- 1923 New South Wales Professional Championship, Australian Professional tournament
- 1925 Australian Open
- 1928 Australian Open
- 1929 New South Wales Professional Championship

== Team appearances ==
- Vicars Shield (representing New South Wales): 1931
