= Australian PGA Championship =

Golf tournament

Coordinates: 28.003°S 153.373°E

BMW Australian PGA Championship
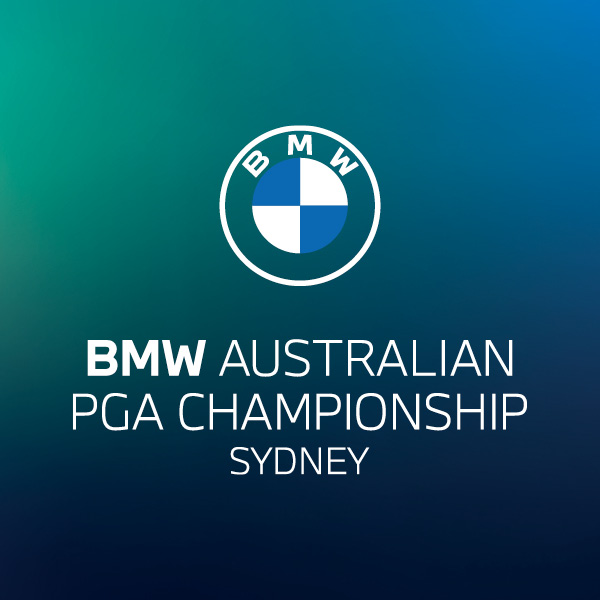

Tournament information
- Location: Sydney, New South Wales, Australia
- Established: 1929
- Course: The Lakes Golf Club
- Par: 72
- Length: 6,880 yards (6,290 m)
- Tours: European Tour; PGA Tour of Australasia; OneAsia Tour
- Format: Stroke play
- Prize fund: A$2,500,000
- Month played: November

Tournament record score
- Aggregate: 262 Jediah Morgan (2022)
- To par: −22 Peter Lonard (2006) −22 Nick O'Hern (2006) −22 Jediah Morgan (2022)
- Score: 9 and 7 Sam Richardson (1933)

Current champion
- (Spain) David Puig

Final champion
- Location in Australia Location in New South Wales

The Australian PGA Championship is a golf tournament on the PGA Tour of Australasia. It is the home tournament of the Australian PGA. From 2000 to 2025, it was held in the South East Queensland region. It is now based in Sydney, New South Wales.

The tournament was part of the OneAsia Tour from 2009 to 2014, and it has been co-sanctioned with the European Tour from 2015 to 2019 and again from 2022-2026.

The championship started in 1929, when the Australian Golf Union decided to hold the Australian Professional Championship during their annual championship meeting. The leading 16 professionals in the Open championship qualified for the match play event, with four rounds of matches over 36 holes. The winner, Rufus Stewart, received the Joe Kirkwood Cup, donated by Australian golfer Joe Kirkwood Sr. After World War II the PGA of Australia took over the organisation of the championship. It continued to be a match-play event until 1964, when it became a 72-hole stroke-play tournament. Kel Nagle holds the record for the most wins, with 6 wins, while Bill Dunk won the championship five times.

Before becoming a "championship" in 1929, a number of professional competitions were held at the Australian Golf Union championship meetings, the first being held in 1904. The Australian PGA treat some of these competitions, starting in 1905, as earlier editions of the same event. They also include the 1926 Sun-Herald Tournament as part of the same series.

== History ==
At the annual meeting of the Australian Golf Union, held during the 1928 championship meeting, it was decided to hold a professional championship, starting at Royal Adelaide in 1929, to add to the Australian Open Championship and the Australian Amateur Championship, which were already held during the meeting. Professional competitions had been held at the championship meeting since 1904 but had never been given the title of "championship". Winners of the Sun-Herald Tournament, held from 1924 to 1926, and which had a similar format to the new championship, had been reported as being the "professional championship of Australia" and the winners called the "professional champion of Australia", although these were not necessarily official titles. Joe Kirkwood, Sr., during a visit to Australia in late 1928, donated a trophy for the new championship. The Australian Professional Championship followed the format of the amateur event, with the leading 16 professionals in the Open championship qualifying for the match play event. All matches were over 36 holes, the first three rounds played from Monday to Wednesday with the final was played on the Saturday, three days after the semifinals. There was tie for 16th place which was resolved by the first round scores in a professional "purse" at Kooyonga, played on the Saturday between the end of the open on Friday and the start of the professional championship on Monday. Rufus Stewart beat Ernie Bissett 8&7 in the final.

The same format was used throughout the 1930s, the only variation being the day of the final. From 1930 to 1932 and in 1938 and 1939 the four rounds were played from Monday to Thursday, while from 1933 to 1937 the final was delayed until Friday to avoid clashing with the amateur final which was played on the Thursday. Rufus Stewart reached the final again 1930 but lost a close match to Jock Robertson. Sam Richardson won the championship twice, in 1933 and 1935. He reached the final again in 1937 but lost to Eric Cremin, who also won in 1938. Two cousins, Ted and George Naismith, reached the 1939 final, Ted winning 7&5.

The first championship organised by the PGA of Australia was in 1946. It retained the previous format with 16 players competing over four days of 36-hole match-play. A qualifying system was used, similar to that used for the earlier Sun-Herald Tournament, with each state having a fixed number of qualifying places, determined by the number of members. New South Wales was allocated six places, Victoria five, Queensland two with South Australia, Tasmania and Western Australia having one each. The states organised their own qualifying events. The championship was played at Manly from 11 to 14 December. The New South Wales qualifying event was a 36-hole stroke-play event played immediately before the championship, at Manly on 9 December. The final was between two of the New South Wales players, with Norman Von Nida beating Eric Cremin by one hole. Cremin reached the final five times between 1946 and 1952, losing them all. In 1947 he lost to Ossie Pickworth and in 1948 he lost to Von Nida again. With only 16 competitors it became practical to play the event in different locations, the 1948 championship being played in Tasmania and the 1949 event in Western Australia. The 1949 championship was won by Kel Nagle, the first of six wins in the event. The 1950 final was a repeat of the 1946 and 1948 finals and saw Von Nida beat Cremin for the third time.

In 1951 the qualifying system was changed, with the PGA Championship being played immediately after the Open. The leading 16 professionals in the Open qualified. Norman Von Nida won the championship, his fourth in six years. Qualification in 1952 was based on the leading professionals in the Sydney Ampol Tournament. Bill Holder beat Eric Cremin in the final. In 1953 the PGA Championship immediately followed the Open, with the Open acting as the qualifying event, as in 1951. Ossie Pickworth won his second championship, beating Peter Thomson in a close final. The Open again acted as the qualifying event in 1954, although the PGA Championship was not played until 6 weeks later, Kel Nagle winning his second title. From 1955 to 1961 the PGA Championship was played the week after the Open, which acted as the qualifying event. It was played in the same area as the Open, but not generally at the same club. In 1955 it was played in Queensland for the first time, Pickworth winning his third title. Les Wilson won in 1956, followed by Gary Player in 1957. Nagle won his third and fourth titles in 1958 and 1959, followed by John Sullivan in 1960 and Alan Murray in 1961. For scheduling reasons, only three days were allocated in 1961, with the first two rounds played over 18 holes on the first day.

In 1962, a 36-hole qualifying event was introduced, replacing qualification via the Open. As in 1961, there were two rounds on the first day of match-play, with 36-hole semi-finals and final on the following two days. The final was one-sided, with Bill Dunk beating Eric Cremin 8&7. Cremin was playing in his seventh final since World War II, but lost them all. A similar format was used in 1963, except that all match-play rounds were over 36 holes. Col Johnston beat the American Ron Howell in the final, which was played on a Sunday for the first time.

In 1964 the tournament changed its format to 72-hole stroke-play. It has been played in that format to the current day, with the exception of 1973 when it reverted to match-play for a single season. Initially it was played over three days, with the leading 40 and ties playing 36 holes on the final day. Col Johnston won for the second year in succession, a stroke ahead of Bruce Devlin. Kel Nagle won for the fifth time in 1965, a shot ahead of Frank Phillips. In 1966 Bill Dunk led by 9 strokes after two rounds. Peter Thomson had a third round 69, to reduce Dunk's lead to two but had a final round 73 to Dunk's 68. Dunk won by 7 from Thomson with Bob Stanton third, a further 6 strokes behind. Thomson had his only win in 1967, having been runner-up four times. Johnston and Phillips tied for second place, a shot behind, with Peter Townsend fourth. Townsend dropped shots at the 14th and 15th holes to fall behind, while Phillips missed a short putt at the final hole.

Arnold Palmer and Jack Nicklaus competed in the 1968 championship, which was extended to four days with a Sunday finish. However, 47-year-old Kel Nagle won the title for the sixth time, 6 ahead of Nicklaus with Bruce Devlin third, a further 5 strokes behind. Bruce Devlin won for the first time in 1969, played in Canberra for the first time, and won again in 1970, when it was played at Surfers Paradise on the Gold Coast. It was played at Surfers Paradise again in 1971, Bill Dunk winning by 3 shots. Dunk came close to winning again in 1972 but was eventually runner-up, two strokes behind Randall Vines. In 1973 the event returned to a match play format. There was a single stroke-play round with the leading 64 qualifying for six 18-hole rounds of match-play over the following three days. Vines repeated his 1972 success beating Stewart Ginn in the final. Dunk won in 1974 after an 18-hole playoff, and won again in 1976, his fifth and final win, also after a playoff.

The 1977 event was sponsored by Telecom and saw an increase in prize money from A$20,000 to A$100,000. Mike Cahill won by 4 strokes. Telecom dropped its sponsorship after a single event and Mayne Nickless became the sponsor from 1978 to 1982, all five tournaments being played at Royal Melbourne. Prize money rose to A$175,000 in 1982. There were three overseas winners in this period, Hale Irwin in 1978, Sam Torrance in 1980 and Seve Ballesteros in 1981. Australians Stewart Ginn and Graham Marsh won in 1979 and 1982. Prize money dropped to A$40,000 in 1983 but rose to A$150,000 in 1984 under new sponsors Toshiba. Greg Norman won in 1984 and 1985, both times by 8 strokes, and was runner-up in 1986, losing to Mike Harwood. ESP sponsored the 1987 event, played at The Lakes Golf Club. Roger Mackay won by a stroke from American Mike Colandro.

From 1988 to 1990 the championship was held at the Riverside Oaks club outside Sydney with prize increasing to A$500,000 in 1989 and 1990. In 1988 Wayne Grady beat Greg Norman after a sudden-death playoff, the first in the championship's history. Peter Senior won in 1989 followed by Brett Ogle, who won by five strokes in 1990. It was held at Concord from 1991 to 1993 with Ford sponsoring the event. Prize money dropped to A$250,000 in 1991 but increased to A$350,000 by 1993. Wayne Grady won for the second time in 1991, followed by Craig Parry in 1992. 1993 saw another playoff with Ian Baker-Finch beating Peter Fowler and Grant Waite. Reebok sponsored the event at the New South Wales club in 1994, prize money being reduced to A$200,000. Andrew Coltart became the first non-Australian to win since 1981. The 1995 event was cancelled because of the lack of a sponsor.

The event returned in 1996 sponsored by Mastercard who also sponsored the event in 1997 and 1998. Prize money was A$400,000 in 1996 rising to A$600,000 in 1998. Phil Tataurangi won in 1996, having started the last round eight strokes behind leader Chris Gray. Andrew Coltart won for the second time in 1997 with David Howell winning by seven strokes in 1998. The 1999 event was played at Victoria Golf Club with reduced prize money of A$300,000 and was won by Greg Turner.

Since 2000 the championship has been held in Queensland, initially at Royal Queensland in Brisbane, before being played 11 times in a row, from 2002 to 2012, at Hyatt Coolum on the Sunshine Coast, later renamed Palmer Coolum. From 2013 to 2019 it was held at Royal Pines on the Gold Coast. From 2009 to 2014 the event was co-sanctioned with the OneAsia tour while the European Tour co-sanctioned the event from 2015 to 2019. Prize money was A$1,000,000 from 2000 to 2004, rising to A$1,500,000 from 2008 to 2011 before falling back to A$1,000,000 in 2014. Under the European Tour co-sanctioning prize money was initially A$1,750,000 in 2015, reducing to A$1,500,000 from 2016 to 2019.

Robert Allenby won the championship in 2000 and successfully defended his title in 2001. He won again in 2005 and, for the fourth time, in 2009. In 2002, Peter Lonard and Jarrod Moseley were tied after 72 holes and after playing one hole of a sudden-death playoff, fading light meant that no further play was possible. They chose to share the title and not return the following day. After this joint win, Lonard won again in 2004 and 2007. He was also involved in a playoff against Nick O'Hern in 2006, O'Hern winning at the fourth extra hole. Peter Senior won in 2003, having previously won in 1989, and won for the third time in 2010 after a playoff against Geoff Ogilvy. Ogilvy was also a previous winner, having won in 2008.

Greg Chalmers won the championship twice, both times after a playoff. In 2011 he beat Robert Allenby and Marcus Fraser at the first extra hole, while in 2014 the playoff went to seven extra holes, before he beat Adam Scott. 2012 produced a surprise winner, with Daniel Popovic winning his only important tournament. Although Scott lost in a playoff in 2014, he won the event twice, in 2013 and 2019. Nathan Holman won in 2015 after a playoff against Dylan Frittelli and Harold Varner III. Varner returned the following year, 2016, and won the championship by two strokes. Cameron Smith won in 2017, after a playoff against Jordan Zunic, and regained the title in 2018.

The 2020 championship was cancelled because of the COVID-19 pandemic, while the 2021 event was rescheduled to January 2022, without European Tour co-sanctioning, at Royal Queensland with prize money of A$1,000,000. Jediah Morgan won the tournament by a record margin of 11 strokes, with a record low score of 262. A second event was held in 2022, at Royal Queensland in November, as part of the 2023 European Tour season. Cameron Smith won by three strokes, his third win in the event. Min Woo Lee won the event in 2023.

== Venues ==
The following venues have been used since the founding of the Australian Professional Championship in 1929.

Venue	Location	First	Last	Times
Royal Adelaide Golf Club	Adelaide, South Australia	1929	1938	4
Metropolitan Golf Club	Melbourne, Victoria	1930	1968	5
The Australian Golf Club	Sydney, New South Wales	1931	1937	2
Royal Melbourne Golf Club	Melbourne, Victoria	1933	1983	10
Royal Sydney Golf Club	Sydney, New South Wales	1934	1966	3
Manly Golf Club	Sydney, New South Wales	1946	1946	1
Kingston Beach Golf Club	Hobart, Tasmania	1948	1948	1
Royal Perth Golf Club	Perth, Western Australia	1949	1949	1
The Lakes Golf Club	Sydney, New South Wales	1950	1987	3
Roseville Golf Club	Sydney, New South Wales	1952	1952	1
Indooroopilly Golf Club	Brisbane, Queensland	1955	1955	1
St. Michael's Golf Club	Sydney, New South Wales	1956	1956	1
Huntingdale Golf Club	Melbourne, Victoria	1957	1957	1
Kooyonga Golf Club	Adelaide, South Australia	1958	1958	1
New South Wales Golf Club	Sydney, New South Wales	1959	1998	5
Royal Fremantle Golf Club	Fremantle, Western Australia	1960	1960	1
Rossdale Golf Club	Melbourne, Victoria	1961	1962	2
Oatlands Golf Club	Sydney, New South Wales	1963	1963	1
Monash Country Club	Sydney, New South Wales	1964	1984	2
Riversdale Golf Club	Melbourne, Victoria	1965	1965	1
Royal Canberra Golf Club	Canberra, Australian Capital Territory	1969	1969	1
Surfers Paradise Golf Club	Gold Coast, Queensland	1970	1971	2
Bonnie Doon Golf Club	Sydney, New South Wales	1973	1973	1
Liverpool Golf Club	Sydney, New South Wales	1974	1974	1
Burleigh Heads Golf Club	Gold Coast, Queensland	1975	1975	1
Rosebud Country Club	Melbourne, Victoria	1976	1976	1
Yarra Yarra Golf Club	Melbourne, Victoria	1977	1977	1
Castle Hill Country Club	Sydney, New South Wales	1985	1986	2
Riverside Oaks Golf Resort	Sydney, New South Wales	1988	1990	3
Concord Golf Club	Sydney, New South Wales	1991	1993	3
Victoria Golf Club	Melbourne, Victoria	1999	1999	1
Royal Queensland Golf Club	Brisbane, Queensland	2000	2025	6
Palmer Coolum Resort (Hyatt Regency Coolum)	Sunshine Coast, Queensland	2002	2012	11
RACV Royal Pines Resort	Gold Coast, Queensland	2013	2019	7

== Winners ==
PGA Tour of Australasia (Flagship event)	2022 (Jan)
PGA Tour of Australasia (Regular)	1973–2019, 2022 (Nov)–
Pre-PGA Tour of Australasia	1929–1972

#	Year	Tour(s) (Note: ANZ − PGA Tour of Australasia; EUR − European Tour; ONE − OneAsia Tour.)	Winner	Score	To par	Margin of victory	Runner(s)-up	Venue	Ref.
BMW Australian PGA Championship
89th	2025	ANZ, EUR	(Spain) David Puig	266	−18	2 strokes	(China) Ding Wenyi	Royal Queensland	
88th	2024	ANZ, EUR	(Australia) Elvis Smylie	199 (Note: Shortened to 54 holes due to rain.)	−14	2 strokes	(Australia) Cameron Smith	Royal Queensland	
Fortinet Australian PGA Championship
87th	2023	ANZ, EUR	(Australia) Min Woo Lee	264	−20	3 strokes	(Japan) Rikuya Hoshino	Royal Queensland	
86th	2022 (Nov)	ANZ, EUR	(Australia) Cameron Smith (3)	270	−14	3 strokes	(Japan) Ryo Hisatsune (Australia) Jason Scrivener	Royal Queensland	
85th	2022 (Jan)	ANZ	(Australia) Jediah Morgan	262	−22	11 strokes	(Australia) Andrew Dodt	Royal Queensland	
Australian PGA Championship
–	2021	ANZ	No tournament due to the COVID-19 pandemic						
–	2020	ANZ, EUR	Cancelled due to the COVID-19 pandemic						
84th	2019	ANZ, EUR	(Australia) Adam Scott (2)	275	−13	2 strokes	(New Zealand) Michael Hendry	Royal Pines	
83rd	2018	ANZ, EUR	(Australia) Cameron Smith (2)	272	−16	2 strokes	(Australia) Marc Leishman	Royal Pines	
82nd	2017	ANZ, EUR	(Australia) Cameron Smith	270	−18	Playoff (Note: Smith won with a par at the second playoff hole.)	(Australia) Jordan Zunic	Royal Pines	
81st	2016	ANZ, EUR	(United States) Harold Varner III	269	−19	2 strokes	(Australia) Andrew Dodt	Royal Pines	
80th	2015	ANZ, EUR	(Australia) Nathan Holman	288	E	Playoff (Note: Holman won with a par on the first playoff hole.)	(South Africa) Dylan Frittelli (United States) Harold Varner III	Royal Pines	
79th	2014	ANZ, ONE	(Australia) Greg Chalmers (2)	277	−11	Playoff (Note: Chalmers won with a par at the seventh extra hole. Ormsby was eliminated by birdies on the third extra hole.)	(Australia) Wade Ormsby (Australia) Adam Scott	Royal Pines	
78th	2013	ANZ, ONE	(Australia) Adam Scott	270	−14	4 strokes	(United States) Rickie Fowler	Royal Pines	
77th	2012	ANZ, ONE	(Australia) Daniel Popovic	272	−16	4 strokes	(Australia) Anthony Brown (Australia) Rod Pampling	Palmer Coolum	
76th	2011	ANZ, ONE	(Australia) Greg Chalmers	276	−12	Playoff (Note: Chalmers won with a par at the first extra hole.)	(Australia) Robert Allenby (Australia) Marcus Fraser	Hyatt Coolum	
75th	2010	ANZ, ONE	(Australia) Peter Senior (3)	276	−12	Playoff (Note: Senior won with a par at the second extra hole.)	(Australia) Geoff Ogilvy	Hyatt Coolum	
74th	2009	ANZ, ONE	(Australia) Robert Allenby (4)	270	−14	4 strokes	(Australia) John Senden (Australia) Scott Strange	Hyatt Coolum	
Cadbury Schweppes Australian PGA Championship
73rd	2008	ANZ	(Australia) Geoff Ogilvy	274	−14	2 strokes	(Australia) Mathew Goggin	Hyatt Coolum	
72nd	2007	ANZ	(Australia) Peter Lonard (3)	268	−20	3 strokes	(New Zealand) David Smail	Hyatt Coolum	
71st	2006	ANZ	(Australia) Nick O'Hern	266	−22	Playoff (Note: O'Hern won with a birdie at the fourth extra hole.)	(Australia) Peter Lonard	Hyatt Coolum	
Cadbury Schweppes Centenary Australian PGA Championship
70th	2005	ANZ	(Australia) Robert Allenby (3)	270	−18	1 stroke	(Australia) Mathew Goggin	Hyatt Coolum	
Cadbury Schweppes Australian PGA Championship
69th	2004	ANZ	(Australia) Peter Lonard (2)	270	−18	2 strokes	(Australia) James Nitties	Hyatt Coolum	
Australian PGA Championship
68th	2003	ANZ	(Australia) Peter Senior (2)	271	−17	1 stroke	(Australia) Rod Pampling	Hyatt Coolum	
67th	2002	ANZ	(Australia) Peter Lonard (Australia) Jarrod Moseley	271	−17	Title shared (Note: Title shared when darkness ended play with Lonard and Moseley still tied after one hole of a sudden-death playoff.)		Hyatt Coolum	
66th	2001	ANZ	(Australia) Robert Allenby (2)	273	−15	1 stroke	(Australia) Geoff Ogilvy	Royal Queensland	
65th	2000	ANZ	(Australia) Robert Allenby	275	−13	1 stroke	(Australia) Steven Conran	Royal Queensland	
64th	1999	ANZ	(New Zealand) Greg Turner	278	−10	2 strokes	(Australia) Shane Tait	Victoria	
MasterCard Australian PGA Championship
63rd	1998	ANZ	(England) David Howell	275	−13	7 strokes	(Trinidad and Tobago) Stephen Ames (Australia) Terry Price	New South Wales	
62nd	1997	ANZ	(Scotland) Andrew Coltart (2)	285	−3	4 strokes	(Australia) Stephen Allan (Australia) Stuart Appleby	New South Wales	
61st	1996	ANZ	(New Zealand) Phil Tataurangi	279	−9	1 stroke	(Australia) Rodger Davis (Australia) Peter Lonard	New South Wales	
Australian PGA Championship
–	1995	ANZ	Cancelled due to lack of sponsorship						
Reebok Australian PGA Championship
60th	1994	ANZ	(Scotland) Andrew Coltart	281	−7	2 strokes	(Australia) Terry Price	New South Wales	
Ford Australian PGA Championship
59th	1993	ANZ	(Australia) Ian Baker-Finch	275	−9	Playoff (Note: Baker-Finch won at the second extra hole.)	(Australia) Peter Fowler (New Zealand) Grant Waite	Concord	
58th	1992	ANZ	(Australia) Craig Parry	269	−15	3 strokes	(Australia) Peter McWhinney	Concord	
57th	1991	ANZ	(Australia) Wayne Grady (2)	271	−13	3 strokes	(Australia) Brett Ogle	Concord	
Australian PGA Championship
56th	1990	ANZ	(Australia) Brett Ogle	273	−11	5 strokes	(Australia) Rodger Davis (Australia) Wayne Grady	Riverside Oaks	
55th	1989	ANZ	(Australia) Peter Senior	274	−14	1 stroke	(United States) Jim Benepe	Riverside Oaks	
54th	1988	ANZ	(Australia) Wayne Grady	275	−13	Playoff (Note: Grady won with a par at the fourth extra hole.)	(Australia) Greg Norman	Riverside Oaks	
ESP Australian PGA Championship
53rd	1987	ANZ	(Australia) Roger Mackay	284	−8	1 stroke	(United States) Mike Colandro	The Lakes	
Toshiba Australian PGA Championship
52nd	1986	ANZ	(Australia) Mike Harwood	275	−13	2 strokes	(Australia) Greg Norman	Castle Hill	
51st	1985	ANZ	(Australia) Greg Norman (2)	273	−15	8 strokes	(Sweden) Magnus Persson	Castle Hill	
50th	1984	ANZ	(Australia) Greg Norman	277	−11	8 strokes	(Australia) Rodger Davis	Monash	
Yakka Australian PGA Championship
49th	1983	ANZ	(Australia) Bob Shearer	288	E	2 strokes	(Australia) Ossie Moore	Royal Melbourne	
Mayne Nickless Australian PGA Championship
48th	1982	ANZ	(Australia) Graham Marsh	282	−6	3 strokes	(Australia) John Clifford (United States) Ben Crenshaw (Australia) Bob Shearer	Royal Melbourne	
47th	1981	ANZ	(Spain) Seve Ballesteros	282	−6	3 strokes	(Australia) Bill Dunk	Royal Melbourne	
46th	1980	ANZ	(Scotland) Sam Torrance	282	−6	2 strokes	(Spain) Seve Ballesteros	Royal Melbourne	
45th	1979	ANZ	(Australia) Stewart Ginn	284	E	3 strokes	(New Zealand) Bob Charles (Australia) Bob Shearer	Royal Melbourne	
44th	1978	ANZ	(United States) Hale Irwin	278	−6	8 strokes	(Australia) Graham Marsh	Royal Melbourne	
Telecom Australia PGA Championship
43rd	1977	ANZ	(Australia) Mike Cahill	278	−10	4 strokes	(Australia) Mike Ferguson	Yarra Yarra	
Australian PGA Championship
42nd	1976	ANZ	(Australia) Bill Dunk (5)	281	−7	Playoff (Note: Dunk beat Croker 71 to 75 in the 18-hole playoff.)	(Australia) Peter Croker	Rosebud	
41st	1975	ANZ	(Australia) Vic Bennetts	287	+3	3 strokes	(Australia) Brian Moran (Australia) Kel Nagle (Australia) Robert Taylor	Burleigh Heads	
40th	1974	ANZ	(Australia) Bill Dunk (4)	279	−9	Playoff (Note: Dunk beat Stanley 71 to 72 in the 18-hole playoff.)	(Australia) Ian Stanley	Liverpool	
39th	1973	ANZ	(Australia) Randall Vines (2)	2 and 1			(Australia) Stewart Ginn	Bonnie Doon	
38th	1972		(Australia) Randall Vines	290	−2	2 strokes	(Australia) Bill Dunk	The Lakes	
37th	1971		(Australia) Bill Dunk (3)	273	−7	3 strokes	(Australia) Graham Marsh (Australia) Bob Shaw	Surfers Paradise	
36th	1970		(Australia) Bruce Devlin (2)	275	−5	3 strokes	(Australia) John Dyer (Australia) Peter Harvey (Australia) Tim Woolbank	Surfers Paradise	
35th	1969		(Australia) Bruce Devlin	277	−11	3 strokes	(Japan) Takashi Murakami	Royal Canberra	
34th	1968		(Australia) Kel Nagle (6)	276	−20	6 strokes	(United States) Jack Nicklaus	Metropolitan	
33rd	1967		(Australia) Peter Thomson	282	−14	1 stroke	(Australia) Col Johnston (Australia) Frank Phillips	Metropolitan	
32nd	1966		(Australia) Bill Dunk (2)	279	−9	7 strokes	(Australia) Peter Thomson	Royal Sydney	
Guinness Australian PGA Championship
31st	1965		(Australia) Kel Nagle (5)	276	−16	1 stroke	(Australia) Frank Phillips	Riversdale	
Australian PGA Championship
30th	1964		(Australia) Col Johnston (2)	275	−13	1 stroke	(Australia) Bruce Devlin	Monash	
29th	1963		(Australia) Col Johnston	3 and 2			(United States) Ron Howell	Oatlands	
28th	1962		(Australia) Bill Dunk	8 and 7			(Australia) Eric Cremin	Rossdale	
27th	1961		(Australia) Alan Murray	2 and 1			(Australia) Frank Phillips	Rossdale	
26th	1960		(Australia) John Sullivan	2 up			(Australia) Norman Von Nida	Royal Fremantle	
25th	1959		(Australia) Kel Nagle (4)	5 and 3			(Australia) Peter Thomson	New South Wales	
24th	1958		(Australia) Kel Nagle (3)	6 and 5			(Australia) Eric Cremin	Kooyonga	
23rd	1957		(South Africa) Gary Player	2 up			(Australia) Peter Thomson	Huntingdale	
22nd	1956		(Australia) Les Wilson	4 and 2			(Australia) Len Woodward	St Michael's	
21st	1955		(Australia) Ossie Pickworth (3)	8 and 7			(Australia) Frank Phillips	Indooroopilly	
20th	1954		(Australia) Kel Nagle (2)	1 up			(Australia) Jim McInnes	Royal Sydney	
19th	1953		(Australia) Ossie Pickworth (2)	1 up			(Australia) Peter Thomson	Royal Melbourne	
18th	1952		(Australia) Bill Holder	2 and 1			(Australia) Eric Cremin	Roseville	
17th	1951		(Australia) Norman Von Nida (4)	6 and 5			(Australia) Ossie Pickworth	Metropolitan	
16th	1950		(Australia) Norman Von Nida (3)	6 and 5			(Australia) Eric Cremin	The Lakes	
15th	1949		(Australia) Kel Nagle	7 and 5			(Australia) Ted Naismith	Royal Perth	
14th	1948		(Australia) Norman Von Nida (2)	2 and 1			(Australia) Eric Cremin	Kingston Beach	
13th	1947		(Australia) Ossie Pickworth	2 and 1			(Australia) Eric Cremin	Royal Melbourne	
12th	1946		(Australia) Norman Von Nida	1 up			(Australia) Eric Cremin	Manly	
1940–1945: No tournament due to World War II
Australian Professional Championship
11th	1939		(Australia) Ted Naismith	7 and 5			(Australia) George Naismith	Royal Melbourne	
10th	1938		(Australia) Eric Cremin (2)	2 and 1			(Australia) Charlie Booth	Royal Adelaide	
9th	1937		(Australia) Eric Cremin	4 and 2			(Australia) Sam Richardson	The Australian	
8th	1936		(Australia) Bill Clifford	4 and 2			(Australia) Ron Harris	Metropolitan	
7th	1935		(Australia) Sam Richardson (2)	2 and 1			(Australia) Horace Boorer	Royal Adelaide	
6th	1934		(Australia) Lou Kelly	2 and 1			(Australia) Billy Bolger	Royal Sydney	
5th	1933		(Australia) Sam Richardson	9 and 7			(Australia) Arthur Spence	Royal Melbourne	
4th	1932		(Australia) Fergus McMahon	7 and 6			(Australia) George Naismith	Royal Adelaide	
3rd	1931		(Australia) Don Spence	2 and 1			(Australia) Billy Bolger	The Australian	
2nd	1930		(Australia) Jock Robertson	2 and 1			(Australia) Rufus Stewart	Metropolitan	
1st	1929		(Australia) Rufus Stewart	8 and 7			(Australia) Ernie Bissett	Royal Adelaide	

=== Earlier competitions ===
Between the foundation of the Australian Open in 1904 and the creation of the Australian Professional Championship in 1929, the leading professionals attended the annual Australian Golf Union championship meeting and a number of professional competitions were organised at this time. Each year there was a professional competition organised by the club hosting the championship meeting and, in addition, other nearby clubs organised professional events.

From 1904 to 1907 a two-day professional event was organised by the host club. The first Australian Open finished on Saturday 3 September 1904, and the leading eight professionals in it played a knock-out competition on the following Monday and Tuesday. The first two rounds were played on the Monday, followed by a 36-hole final. Carnegie Clark beat Alex McLaren 5&4 in the final. In 1905 the professional event was played on the two days before the Open championship. After 36 holes of stroke-play on the first day, the leading four played match-play on the following day, matches being over 18 holes. Dan Soutar beat Gilbert Martin in the final. The 1906 tournament was played using the same format as in 1904 and resulted in another win for Soutar. Soutar won again in 1907, in a tournament with four rounds of match-play played over two days, with no qualification. The 1908 event was also match-play only but was extended to three days, the first round on Monday, two rounds on Tuesday and the final played on the Saturday. Carnegie Clark repeated his success of 1904.

From 1909 to 1913 there was no match-play event organised for the professionals, although a one-day 36-hole stroke-play event was organised each year on the championship course. In 1909 and 1910 it was played the day before the Australian Open. In 1909 there was a tie between Fred Popplewell and Willie Thomson, while Dan Soutar won by 8 strokes in 1910. From 1911 to 1913 the professional events were played after the Open. Charlie Campbell won in 1911, while Soutar won again in 1912. In 1913 the professionals had two events at the Royal Melbourne. The first, with prize money of £25, was played on the Monday following the Open and was won by Soutar, with Popplewell and Rufus Stewart runners-up. The professionals played at the Metropolitan Golf Club on the Wednesday and then a second event was played at Royal Melbourne on the Thursday, again with prize money of £25. The result was similar to the Monday event with Soutar winning, Stewart second and Popplewell third. Soutar set a new course record of 70 in his morning round. The second event was sponsored by Watson's No. 10 Whisky with the intention that it would be an annual event.

From 1920 to 1928, a two-day competition was arranged for the professionals after the Open. A 36-hole stroke-play qualifying stage was held on the Monday with the leading four playing match-play on the Tuesday. In 1928 the event was held a day later, on the Tuesday and Wednesday. The 1920 and 1921 events were handicapped. In 1920, Joe Kirkwood Sr., the open champion, was handicapped at plus-6 and failed to qualify. Walter Clark, receiving 3 strokes, beat Dan Soutar 2&1 in the final. In 1921, Billy Iles, receiving 2 strokes, beat Arthur Le Fevre by 2 holes in the final. The handicap element was dropped in 1922, Charlie Campbell winning. Fred Popplewell won in 1923 while Tom Howard won in 1924 and 1925 followed by Arthur Le Fevre in 1926. Harry Sinclair repeated Howard's achievement, winning in 1927 and 1928.

The following competitions were played on the championship course during this period.

Year	Winner	Score	Margin of victory	Runner-up	Venue	Ref
1928	(Australia) Harry Sinclair	1 up		(Australia) Vic James	Royal Sydney	
1927	(Australia) Harry Sinclair	4 and 3		(England) Alf Toogood	Royal Melbourne	
1926	(Australia) Arthur Le Fevre	4 and 3		(Australia) Ted Smith	Royal Adelaide	
1925	(Australia) Tom Howard	3 and 1		(Australia) Fred Popplewell	The Australian	
1924	(Australia) Tom Howard	4 and 2		(Australia) Arthur Le Fevre	Royal Melbourne	
1923	(Australia) Fred Popplewell	2 and 1		(Australia) Rufus Stewart	Royal Adelaide	
1922	(Australia) Charlie Campbell	1 up		(Australia) Tom Howard	Royal Sydney	
1921	(Australia) Billy Iles	2 up (Note: Iles received 2 strokes)		(Australia) Arthur Le Fevre	Royal Melbourne	
1920	(Australia) Walter Clark	2 and 1 (Note: Clark received 3 strokes)		(Australia) Dan Soutar	The Australian	
1914–19: No tournament due to World War I
1913	(Scotland) Dan Soutar	145	6 strokes	(Australia) Rufus Stewart	Royal Melbourne	
1913	(Scotland) Dan Soutar	154	2 strokes	(Australia) Fred Popplewell (Australia) Rufus Stewart	Royal Melbourne	
1912	(Scotland) Dan Soutar	163	4 strokes	(Australia) Rowley Banks	Royal Melbourne	
1911	(Australia) Charlie Campbell	154	3 strokes	(Australia) Carnegie Clark (Australia) Reg Clark (Scotland) Dan Soutar (Scotland) Willie Thomson	Royal Sydney	
1910	(Scotland) Dan Soutar	153	8 strokes	(Australia) Rufus Stewart	Royal Adelaide	
1909	(Australia) Fred Popplewell (Scotland) Willie Thomson	163	Tied		Royal Melbourne	
1908	(Australia) Carnegie Clark	4 and 3		(Australia) Victor East	The Australian	
1907	(Scotland) Dan Soutar	4 and 3		(Australia) Alex McLaren	Royal Melbourne	
1906	(Scotland) Dan Soutar	5 and 3		(New Zealand) Fred Hood	Royal Sydney	
1905	(Scotland) Dan Soutar	4 and 3		(Australia) Gilbert Martin	Royal Melbourne	
1904	(Australia) Carnegie Clark	5 and 4		(Australia) Alex McLaren	The Australian	
