= Arthur Le Fevre =

Australian professional golfer

Personal information
- Nationality: Australia
- Born: 1887 Rye, Sussex, England
- Died: 27 June 1957 (aged 69–70) Sandringham, Melbourne, Victoria, Australia

Career
- Sport: Golf
- Status: Professional

Arthur Le Fevre (1887 – 27 June 1957) was an Australian professional golfer and golf club maker. He won the 1921 Australian Open.

== Early life ==
Le Fevre was born in Rye, Sussex, England in 1887 as Arthur Feaver, the son of Henry Feaver and Caroline (née Wiffin). He was at Rye Golf Club and later at Henley. He emigrated to Australia in 1912. He served in the Australian Imperial Force during World War I, returning to Australia in 1919. His younger brother, Ernest (1893–1968), was also a professional golfer in Australia.

== Professional career ==
Le Fevre was initially an assistant to Dan Soutar at Manly Golf Club in Sydney. After World War I he moved to Royal Melbourne Golf Club as an assistant, becoming the acting professional there in 1921 during Victor East's absence in America with Joe Kirkwood Sr., and soon afterwards the full professional on East's resignation.

Le Fevre's biggest success as a player was winning the 1921 Australian Open at Royal Melbourne. He finished 10 strokes clear of Tom Rutledge, a local amateur. Le Fevre's first round of 71 and third round of 69 were the best of the tournament. He used just six clubs during the event. The following year he was runner-up to Charlie Campbell at Royal Sydney, 3 strokes behind. In 1923 he won the Victorian Professional Championship by 14 strokes from Rowley Banks and Campbell. He was runner-up in the event 3 times, in 1926, 1927 and 1930. Le Fevre qualified for the final stage of all three editions of the Sun-Herald Tournament. He lost in the first round in 1924 and 1925 but reached the final in 1926, losing 6&5 to Frank Eyre, taking the second prize of £100.

== Later life ==
Le Fevre retired from his position as the professional at Royal Melbourne Golf Club at the end of 1948, being replaced by Ossie Pickworth, although he continued to work as a club maker. He died at his home in Sandringham, Melbourne, Victoria on 27 June 1957.

== Professional wins ==
- 1921 Australian Open
- 1923 Age and Leader purse, Victorian Professional Championship
- 1925 Age and Leader purse
- 1926 Australian Professional tournament
- 1928 Age and Leader purse

== Team appearances ==
- Vicars Shield (representing Victoria): 1930
