= Royal Queensland Golf Club =

Golf club in Australia

Coordinates: 27.44130°S 153.09246°E

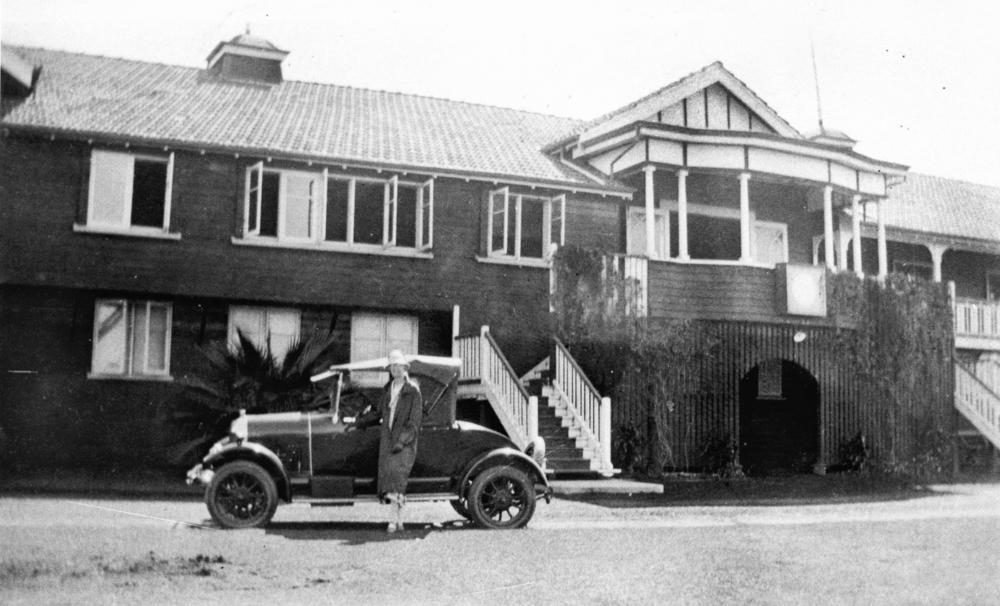
- Clubhouse of the Royal Queensland Golf Club, Hamilton, Brisbane, ca. 1925

Club information
- Location: Eagle Farm, Queensland
- Type: Private
- Tournaments: Australian Open; Australian PGA Championship; Queensland Open; Queensland PGA Championship
- Website: www.rqgolf.com.au

Original Course
- Designed by: Carnegie Clark (1920)

New Course
- Designed by: Mike Clayton (2007)

The Royal Queensland Golf Club is a golf club and course at the end of Curtin West Avenue, Eagle Farm, Brisbane, Queensland, Australia. Located beside the Brisbane River is a 10-minute drive from the Brisbane CBD. It has hosted the Australian Open three times: in 1947, 1966, and 1973.

== History ==
The Royal Queensland Golf Club was founded in 1920, initially as the Queensland Golf Club. The original course was designed by Carnegie Clark, the Australian Open Champion, and was opened by the Governor-General Lord Forster in 1921. King George V gave the club its Royal Charter in 1921; the King's official letter of notification to the Governor of Queensland was signed by Winston Churchill (then British Secretary of State). Construction of the new Championship course was completed in December 2007. In 2005, the Queensland Government decided to build a second Gateway Bridge over the Brisbane River, which impacted on the original course. The new Royal Queensland layout was designed by Mike Clayton.

== Geography ==
The course is on the northern bank of the Brisbane River. The course is flat with the front 9 working around the grounds in a clockwise fashion and the back 9 inside the front 9. The Gateway Motorway passes alongside the eastern boundary.

== Reciprocal Clubs ==
The Royal Queensland Golf Club has an extensive global and domestic club list. Clubs include The Australian, Hong Kong, New South Wales, Royal Adelaide, Royal Melbourne and Royal Sydney.

== Australian Open ==
The winners of these three Australian Open's are:

- 1973 J. C. Snead (USA)
- 1966 Arnold Palmer (USA)
- 1947 Ossie Pickworth (AUS)

== Notable members ==
Adam Scott, David Graham, Ian Baker-Finch, Cameron Smith and Greg Norman are current members of the club.

== See also ==
- List of golf clubs granted Royal status
- List of Australian organisations with royal patronage
