= Al Howard (golfer) =

Albert Howard (8 May 1913 – 10 January 2014) was an Australian golfer and golf course architect. He was a golf professional at many courses and designed many golf courses.

== Early life ==
Al Howard was born in Sydney on 8 May 1913, the son of golf champion Thomas Howard and his wife Ellen.

== Golf ==
Howard began his golfing career caddying for his father. He had a long career in professional golf, combining tournament competitions and serving as golf professional at numerous golf clubs. He became increasingly involved in golf course design, including Woollahra Golf Course, Cromer Golf Course, The Springs Golf Course at Peats Ridge, Corowa Golf Course, Forbes Golf Course, Rockhampton Golf Course, and Rosnay golf course.
