= Victoria Golf Club (Australia) =

- Interactive map of Victoria Golf Club
- 37.9667°S 145.0448°E

Club information
- Location: Cheltenham, Victoria
- Type: private
- Website: https://www.victoriagolf.com.au/

The Victoria Golf Club is a golf club in Cheltenham, Victoria, Australia. It is located in the Melbourne Sandbelt, and its course is consistently ranked amongst the best in Australia. It has hosted many events over the years including the Australian Open in 1961, 1981, 2002, 2022 and 2024, and the Women's Australian Open in 1974, 1976 and 2014.

== Tournaments hosted ==
- 1961 Australian Open
- 1964 Wills Masters
- 1964 Victorian Open
- 1966 Wills Masters
- 1968 Espirito Santo Trophy
- 1969 Wills Masters
- 1971 Wills Masters
- 1973 Wills Masters
- 1974 Women's Australian Open
- 1975 Wills Masters
- 1976 Colgate Champion of Champions
- 1976 Women's Australian Open
- 1977 Colgate Champion of Champions
- 1981 Australian Open
- 1994 Victorian Open
- 1995 Victorian Open
- 1997 Victorian Open
- 1998 Victorian Open
- 1999 Australian PGA Championship
- 1999 Victorian Open
- 2002 Australian Open
- 2010 Australian Masters
- 2011 Australian Masters
- 2014 Women's Australian Open
- 2022 Mixed Australian Open

== See also ==
- List of links golf courses
