= Age and Leader purse =

Golf tournament held in Australia

Tournament information
- Location: Victoria, Australia
- Established: 1923
- Format: Match play
- Final year: 1930

Final champion
- Ted Naismith

The Age and Leader purse was an annual professional golf tournament held in Victoria, Australia, from 1923 to 1930. It was sponsored by The Age and The Leader newspapers. Arthur Le Fevre won the event three times while Don Thomson won it twice.

== History ==
The event ran from 1923 to 1930 with the same format each year. On the first day there was a 36-hole stroke-play qualifying stage. The leading 8 then played match-play. The 18-hole quarter and semi-finals were played on the second day, with the 36-hole final on the third day. Generally the qualifying and match-play stages were played on different courses.

The first event was held in September 1923. The qualifying day was held at Riversdale Golf Club with the match-play being at Yarra Yarra Golf Club, starting two days later. Arthur Le Fevre met Allan Maiden in the final, although the two had only finished seventh and fifth in the qualifying. Maiden was 3 up after the morning round but Le Fevre was 4 up after 11 holes of the afternoon round, eventually winning 2&1. Maiden had been hit by a tram on the way to the final, suffering bruises and abrasions. The second event was in March 1924. Arthur Le Fevre led the qualifying at Elsternwick Golf Club by 7 strokes, after rounds of 71 and 68. However, Billy Iles and Harold Power reached the final at Commonwealth, Iles winning 9&8.

The 1925 qualifying was held Victoria Golf Club, Rowley Banks leading with a score of 147. Arthur Le Fevre met Banks in the final at Metropolitan, Le Fevre winning 3&2. 1926 qualifying was held at Metropolitan with the match-play at Commonwealth. Don Thomson led qualifying with a score of 151. Thomson beat Reg Jupp 7&5 in the final. 1927 qualifying was at Sandridge Golf Club with the match-play at Yarra Yarra. Thomson again led the qualifying, with a score of 148. The final was a repeat of 1926, with Thomson meeting Jupp. Thomson was 7 up at lunch and still 6 up with 7 holes to play. Jupp then won 3 holes in a row and the match was eventually won by Thomson, 2&1.

Reg Jupp led the 1928 qualifying at Commonwealth with a score of 168. The match-play was at Royal Melbourne, and the local professional, Arthur Le Fevre beat John Young 5&4 in the final, for his third victory in the event. Qualifying was at Woodlands in 1929, Young leading on 148. Jupp met Arthur Spence in the final at Victoria Golf Club. The match was all square at lunch, but Jupp won 4&3 in the afternoon. In 1930 all three days were played at Royal Melbourne. Ted Naismith, an assistant at the home club, led the qualifying on 150. Naismith met Don Thomson in the final. Thomas was 4 up after 10 holes but Naismith later levelled the match with 7 holes to play. Thomson led by one hole with two to play, but Naismith won the last two holes to win the match.

== Winners ==
Year	Winner	Margin of victory	Runner-up	Venue	Ref.
1923	(Australia) Arthur Le Fevre	2 & 1	(Australia) Allan Maiden	Yarra Yarra	
1924	(Australia) Billy Iles	9 & 8	(Australia) Harold Power	Commonwealth	
1925	(Australia) Arthur Le Fevre (2)	3 & 2	(Australia) Rowley Banks	Metropolitan	
1926	(Australia) Don Thomson	7 & 5	(Australia) Reg Jupp	Commonwealth	
1927	(Australia) Don Thomson (2)	2 & 1	(Australia) Reg Jupp	Yarra Yarra	
1928	(Australia) Arthur Le Fevre (3)	5 & 4	(Australia) John Young	Royal Melbourne	
1929	(Australia) Reg Jupp	4 & 3	(Australia) Arthur Spence	Victoria	
1930	(Australia) Ted Naismith	1 up	(Australia) Don Thomson	Royal Melbourne	
