= Frank Eyre =

Australian professional golfer

Personal information
- Full name: Francis Patrick Eyre
- Nationality: Australia
- Born: c. 1898 Sydney, New South Wales, Australia
- Died: 1 September 1974 (aged 76) Sydney, New South Wales, Australia

Career
- Sport: Golf
- Status: Professional

Francis Patrick Eyre (c. 1898 – 1 September 1974) was an Australian professional golfer. He won the 1926 Sun-Herald Tournament and the 1930 Australian Open.

== Early life ==
Eyre was the son of Edward "Happy" Eyre, a life-saver at Manly beach and rugby union player. Frank Eyre himself was also a rugby union player in the early 1920s. He became the professional at Long Reef Golf Club, Collaroy, New South Wales in 1922.

== Professional career ==
Eyre's first big success came in 1926 when he won the Sun-Herald Tournament at The Australian Golf Club, beat Arthur Le Fevre 6&5 in the final. He won the first prize of £195 and a gold medal valued at £5. The event was widely regarded as the professional championship of Australia. Eyre had qualified for the final stages in 1925 at Royal Melbourne Golf Club, losing to Tom Howard, the eventual winner, in the quarter-finals.

Eyre won the 1930 Queensland Open, beating Harry Sinclair in playoff at Royal Queensland. He had been runner-up in the event in 1926. Eyre won the 1930 Australian Open, finishing 7 strokes ahead of the runners-up, amateur George Fawcett and Rufus Stewart. It was the first to be held at the Metropolitan Golf Club and Eyre was the first to be presented with the Stonehaven Cup, presented by Lord Stonehaven, the Governor-General of Australia from 1925 to 1930. Eyre had been runner-up in 1929.

Eyre won the 1933 New South Wales Dunlop Cup, beating Tom Heard in the final.

== Later life ==
In 1963, Eyre retired as professional at Long Reef Golf Club, having been the professional there for over 40 years. He died on 1 September 1974, aged 76.

== Professional wins ==
- 1926 Sun-Herald Tournament
- 1930 Queensland Open, Australian Open
- 1933 Dunlop Cup (New South Wales)

== Team appearances ==
- Vicars Shield (representing New South Wales): 1930, 1931, 1932, 1933 (winners)
