= RACV Royal Pines Resort =

Royal Pines Resort
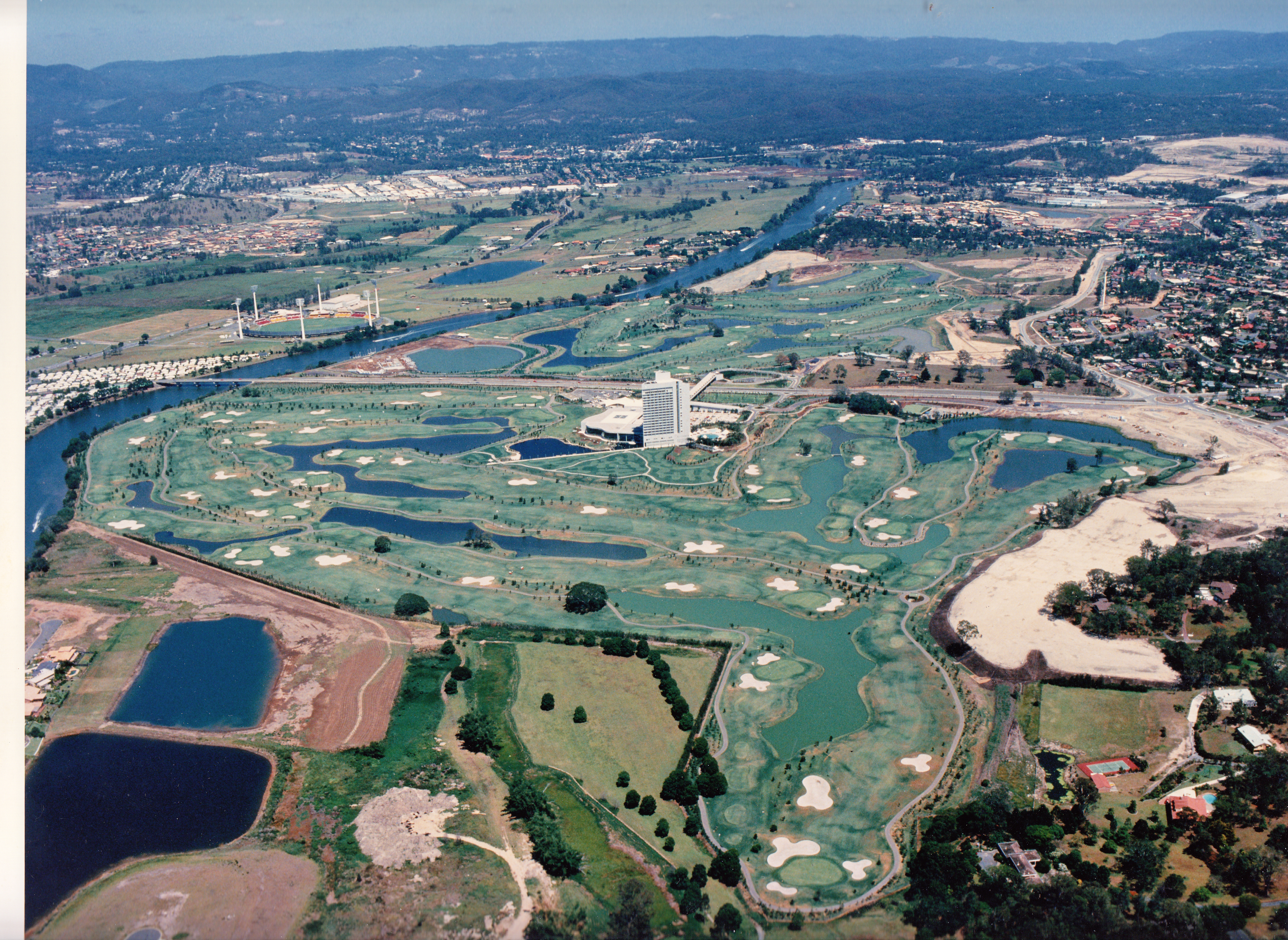
- Aerial view of the Royal Pines Resort in the Gold Coast, Australia
- Interactive map of the Royal Pines Resort area

General information
- Status: Operating
- Type: Resort and Conference Center
- Location: Ross St, Benowa QLD 4217, Australia
- Coordinates: 28.0045°S 153.37652°E
- Construction started: 1988
- Completed: 1991
- Opening: 1991
- Owner: RACV Resorts

Design and construction
- Architects: Edward Larrabee Barnes and John MY Lee Architects

The RACV Royal Pines Resort is located in Benowa, City of Gold Coast, Queensland, Australia. It is the host of the Australian PGA Championship and the Australian Ladies Masters. The resort contains a triangular tower hotel, conference center and a 27-hole golf course. It is the former host of the Mondial Australian Women's Hardcourts on the WTA Tour, which is now the Brisbane International in Brisbane, Australia.

== History ==
The Royal Pines Gold Coast Resort and conference center was designed by Edward Larrabee Barnes and John M.Y. Lee Architects and finished in 1991. The developers were MID (Matsushita Investment and Development Company) It is currently owned by the RACV Resorts Division (Royal Automobile Club of Victoria).

The golf course was designed by Tomojiro Maruyama, a Japanese Golfer and Course Architect.

The team members involved in the 2026 Defection of Iran's women's national football team were staying at this resort.

== See also ==
- List of golf clubs granted Royal status
- List of Australian organisations with royal patronage
