= Australian Open (golf) =

Australian golf tournament

Capital.com Australian Open
Tournament information
- Location: Heatherton, Victoria, Australia
- Established: 1904
- Course: Kingston Heath
- Par: 72
- Length: 6,946 yards (6,351 m)
- Organized by: Golf Australia
- Tours: European Tour; PGA Tour of Australasia; OneAsia Tour
- Format: Stroke play
- Prize fund: A$2,000,000
- Month played: December

Tournament record score
- Aggregate: 264 Gary Player (1965)
- To par: −28 as above

Current champion
- (Denmark) Rasmus Neergaard-Petersen

Final champion
- Location in Australia Location in Victoria

The Australian Open, owned and run by Golf Australia, is the oldest and most prestigious golf tournament on the PGA Tour of Australasia. The Open was first played in 1904 and takes place toward the end of each year.

The winner of the tournament receives the Stonehaven Cup, presented by Lord Stonehaven, the Governor-General of Australia from 1925 to 1930. It was first presented in 1930.

== Status ==
The Australian Open was the flagship tournament of the PGA Tour of Australasia from 1992 to 2019. It had a special status in the Official World Golf Ranking's points system, awarding a minimum 32 points to the winner regardless of the strength of the field.

The tournament was part of the OneAsia Tour from 2009 to 2016. The 2022–2026 editions were co-sanctioned by the European Tour.

Since the Open Qualifying Series was introduced for the 2014 Open Championship, the Australian Open has been the first of a number of qualifying tournaments, giving up to three non-exempt players entry into the Open Championship.

The Australian Open was once referred to as the "fifth major" by Jack Nicklaus and Rory McIlroy.

== History ==
The Australian Golf Union was formed in 1898 and from 1899 organised a championship meeting. From 1899 to 1902 this included the Australian Amateur championship contested over 72 holes of stroke play. In 1903 the format was revised, there being a 36-hole stroke-play stage after which the leading 8 played match-play with a 36-hole final. The 1904 championship meeting was held at The Australian Golf Club. In 1903, the club had hosted the New South Wales Amateur and had run the 36-hole stroke-play qualifying stage as an open event, with professionals as well as amateurs competing. The idea was used at the 1904 championship meeting. There was a 72-hole stroke-play event open to professionals, played over two days, after which the leading 16 amateurs competed for the amateur championship. The stroke-play event became the first Australian Open and was won by an English amateur, Michael Scott, with a score of 315. Two more amateurs Leslie Penfold Hyland and Dan Soutar finished second and third, while Carnegie Clark was the leading professional, tied for fourth place.

The 1905 championship meeting was played at Royal Melbourne and the open and amateur championship were decided by the same 72-hole tournament. Dan Soutar, now a professional, won the open with Michael Scott second, 10 strokes behind. As the leading amateur, Scott won the amateur championship. The 1906 open was won by Carnegie Clark, 5 ahead of Soutar. Soutar was to be runner-up in five successive opens, from 1906 to 1910. In 1907 Scott repeated his success of 1904, and further amateur wins came in the following two years, Clyde Pearce winning in 1908 and Claude Felstead in 1909. The 1910 open was held in South Australia for the first time and resulted in a second win for Clark, with a record score of 306, 11 strokes ahead of Soutar. Clark won for the third time the following year, although only by a single shot from Fred Popplewell. The 1912 open was won by an 18-year-old amateur, Ivo Whitton, 5 ahead of Popplewell and Soutar. Whitton won again the following year with a new record score of 302. Another amateur Audley Lemprière came second with Soutar third, a distant 15 strokes behind Whitton.

The open restarted in 1920 and was won by Joe Kirkwood Sr. with a score of 290, 12 strokes better than the previous record score. Dan Soutar was second, 5 shots behind, the seventh time he had been runner-up. Five of the nine opens between 1924 and 1932 were won by amateurs. In 1924 Alex Russell led from the start after an opening round of 68 and, with further rounds of 79, 78 and 78, won by two strokes from Carnegie Clark. Ivo Whitton won in 1926, 13 years after his last win, and won again in 1929 and 1931. Mick Ryan won in 1932, the third successive amateur winner at Royal Adelaide. Of the professionals, Fred Popplewell won twice, in 1925 and 1928, while Rufus Stewart won in 1927 and was runner-up in the other four opens between 1926 and 1930. 1928 was the first Open played over 3 days, with 36 holes on the final day. There was a cut after 36 holes with the leading 60 and ties playing on the final day. With the leading 16 amateurs in the Open qualifying for the match play stage of the amateur championship, there was also a proviso that at least 24 amateurs should make the cut. The 1930 open was the first to be held at the Metropolitan Golf Club and the winner, Frank Eyre, was the first to be presented with the Stonehaven Cup.

1931 saw the emergence of 16-year-old Jim Ferrier. Needing 5 at the last hole to tie Ivo Whitton, he took 6 and finished runner-up. He was also a runner-up in 1933 and 1935. He had another good change to win in 1935 but took 7 at the 71st hole and again finished a stroke behind the winner. He didn't win the open until 1938, when he won by a record 14 strokes from Norman Von Nida. He repeated his success in 1939. 1934 saw the first serious American challenger when Gene Sarazen played in the event. He was on a world tour with Joe Kirkwood Jr. However Billy Bolger won the open with a new record score of 283, with Sarazen second and Kirkwood fourth. Sarazen returned in 1936 and won with a score of 282, a new record.

The championship resumed in 1946 at Royal Sydney and was won by Ossie Pickworth, who finished two ahead of the amateur Alan Waterson. The Australian Amateur was also played at Royal Sydney, starting the following week. However, the Open no longer acted as a qualifying event for the amateur championship, which became match-play only. 1947 was the first year that the open and amateur were played at different venues, Royal Queensland hosting the open for the first time. It was also the first time it had been played as early as June. Billy McWilliam scored 65 in the first round and took an 8 stroke lead. He still led by 4 at the start of the final round but took 78, while Pickworth scored 69 to retain his title by 5 shots. From 1947 it was generally the case that the Open and the Amateur were played at separate venues. This naturally tended to reduce the number of amateurs playing in the open, since they no longer had to play it to qualify for the amateur championship. 1948 saw the first appearance of Jim Ferrier since 1939, creating much public interest in the event. Pickworth and Ferrier tied on 289, resulting in the first open playoff. Pickworth won the 18 hole playoff with a score of 71 to Ferrier's 74, to win his third successive title. Pickworth seemed likely to win his fourth title in 1949 as he led by 6 strokes after 3 rounds. However, Eric Cremin had a last round of 68 to Pickworth's 80 to win the title. Pickworth was later disqualified for recording an incorrect score at his final hole, so that Norman Von Nida, playing in his first open since 1939, became the runner-up.

Norman Von Nida was the leading player of the early-1950s, winning the open in 1950, 1952 and 1953 and being a runner-up in the other four opens between 1949 and 1955. Peter Thomson won in 1951 while Ossie Pickworth took his fourth title in 1954. 1952 was the first open held in Western Australia, being played at Lake Karrinyup. Von Nida won with a record score of 278. Von Nida equalled that record in 1953 and also equalled the record for the lowest round, with his final 65. Bobby Locke won in 1955, the first overseas winner since 1936. This was played at Gailes, near Brisbane, in late May, the earliest of any open. Kel Nagle seems a likely winner in 1956 but finished badly, for a final round 76, while Bruce Crampton finished with two birdies for a 68 and won by two strokes.

Gary Player made his first appearance in 1957, and would eventually win the title 7 times. He seemed a likely winner on his debut, but in the final round took 7 at the 13th and 6 at the 16th and lost by a stroke from Frank Phillips. Player returned in 1958, winning by 5 strokes. Kel Nagle had been close to winning a number of times and won his only open in 1959. The 1960 open was held at Lake Karrinyup for the second time, a week after the amateur championship. Bruce Devlin, still an amateur, won his only open. Amateurs took 8 of the first 9 places. Player returned in 1961 but only finished tied for third, Phillips winning by two strokes from Nagle. Player won in 1962, by two strokes from Nagle. Jack Nicklaus made his debut in 1962, finishing 5th. Player won again in 1963, his third win, by 5 shots from Bruce Devlin. Devlin came close to winning in 1964. Needing a par-5 at the 72nd hole he took 6, and then lost to Jack Nicklaus by 3 strokes in an 18-hole playoff. The playoff was played on a Sunday, the first Sunday play in the open's history. Player won his fourth title in 1965, setting a new record score of 264, despite taking a bogey-5 at the final hole. Player started with a record round of 62 and had another 62 in the third round. Nicklaus and Phillips tied for second place, 6 behind Player.

The 1966 open was the first to be held over four days and the first to finish on a Sunday. Arnold Palmer made his debut in the event and won by 5 strokes from Kel Nagle. Peter Thomson won his second open in 1967, the first Australian winner since 1961. He won by 7 strokes from Col Johnston. Jack Nicklaus won for the second time in 1968, beating Gary Player by a stroke after making a birdie-3 at the final hole. The 1968 open was sponsored by a local TV company, the first open to be sponsored. From 1969 the event was sponsored by Qantas. In difficult conditions, Player had a final round 77, but still won his 5th title in 1969, equalling Ivo Whitton's record. In 1970 Player led by 8 strokes after three rounds and, despite a last round 74, won by 3, for his 6th win in the event. In 1971 the open was held in Tasmania for the only time, at Royal Hobart. Nicklaus had a 9-stroke lead after three rounds and won by 8 shots. In 1972 there was an 18-hole playoff after a tie between Peter Thomson and David Graham. Graham drove out-of-bounds at the first hole and Thomson took a three-stroke lead after making a birdie. Thomson eventually won by 6 strokes for his third title. J. C. Snead won in 1973, by two strokes from Jerry Breaux, a little-known American. In 1974 Player won his 7th title. Leading by 5 strokes at the start of the final round, he scored 73 and won by 3.

From 1975 to 1978 the open was held at The Australian Golf Club. Kerry Packer had funded a redesign of the course by Jack Nicklaus. The event was broadcast through Packer's Channel Nine network. He also financed a large increase in the prize money. Nicklaus won three of the four events, in 1975, 1976 and 1978 while David Graham won in 1977. The 1979 and 1980 events were sponsored by Dunhill but with less prize money than in 1978. Jack Newton won in 1979 with Greg Norman winning in 1980. The 1981 event was multi-sponsored, without a title sponsor, and was won by Bill Rogers, beating Norman by a stroke.

Having not been played in 2020 or 2021 because of the COVID-19 pandemic. The event returned in 2022. It was announced that the 2022 tournament would feature the men's and women's Opens played on the same course at the same time. They would also share a prize fund of US$3,400,000. In addition to this announcement, it was also confirmed that the European Tour would sanction the men's event for the first time.

=== Venues ===
Venue	Location	First	Last	Times
The Australian Golf Club	Sydney	1904	2023	22
Royal Melbourne Golf Club	Melbourne	1905	2025	17
Royal Sydney Golf Club	Sydney	1906	2016	15
Royal Adelaide Golf Club	Adelaide, South Australia	1910	1998	9
Metropolitan Golf Club	Melbourne	1930	1997	7
Royal Queensland Golf Club	Brisbane, Queensland	1947	1973	3
Kingston Heath Golf Club	Melbourne	1948	2024	9
Kooyonga Golf Club	Adelaide, South Australia	1950	1972	5
Lake Karrinyup Country Club	Perth, Western Australia	1952	1974	4
Gailes Golf Club	Brisbane, Queensland	1955	1955	1
Victoria Golf Club	Melbourne	1961	2024	5
The Lakes Golf Club	Sydney	1964	2023	8
Commonwealth Golf Club	Melbourne	1967	1967	1
Royal Hobart Golf Club	Hobart, Tasmania	1971	1971	1
The Grand Golf Club	Gold Coast, Queensland	2001	2001	1
Moonah Links Golf Club	Rye, Victoria	2003	2005	2
New South Wales Golf Club	Sydney	2009	2009	1

== Winners ==
PGA Tour of Australasia (Flagship event)	1992–2019
PGA Tour of Australasia (Regular)	1973–1991, 2022–
Pre-PGA Tour of Australasia	1904–1972

#	Year	Tour(s) (Note: ANZ − PGA Tour of Australasia; EUR − European Tour; ONE − OneAsia Tour.)	Winner	Score	To par	Margin of victory	Runner(s)-up	Winner's share (A$)	Venue	Ref.
Crown Australian Open
108th	2025	ANZ, EUR	(Denmark) Rasmus Neergaard-Petersen	269	−15	1 stroke	(Australia) Cameron Smith	340,000	Royal Melbourne	
ISPS Handa Australian Open
107th	2024	ANZ, EUR	(United States) Ryggs Johnston	269	−18	3 strokes	(Australia) Curtis Luck	289,000	Kingston Heath; Victoria	
106th	2023	ANZ, EUR	(Chile) Joaquín Niemann	271	−14	Playoff	(Japan) Rikuya Hoshino	289,000	The Australian; The Lakes	
105th	2022	ANZ, EUR	(Poland) Adrian Meronk	268	−14	5 strokes	(Australia) Adam Scott	289,000	Kingston Heath; Victoria	
Australian Open
–	2021	ANZ	Cancelled due to the COVID-19 pandemic							
Emirates Australian Open
–	2020	ANZ	Cancelled due to the COVID-19 pandemic							
104th	2019	ANZ	(Australia) Matt Jones (2)	269	−15	1 stroke	(South Africa) Louis Oosthuizen	270,000	The Australian	
103rd	2018	ANZ	(Mexico) Abraham Ancer	272	−16	5 strokes	(Australia) Dimitrios Papadatos	225,000	The Lakes	
102nd	2017	ANZ	(Australia) Cameron Davis	273	−11	1 stroke	(Sweden) Jonas Blixt (Australia) Matt Jones	225,000	The Australian	
101st	2016	ANZ, ONE	(United States) Jordan Spieth (2)	276	−12	Playoff (Note: Spieth won with a birdie on the first hole of a sudden-death playoff.)	(Australia) Ashley Hall (Australia) Cameron Smith	225,000	Royal Sydney	
100th	2015	ANZ, ONE	(Australia) Matt Jones	276	−8	1 stroke	(Australia) Adam Scott (United States) Jordan Spieth	225,000	The Australian	
99th	2014	ANZ, ONE	(United States) Jordan Spieth	271	−13	6 strokes	(Australia) Rod Pampling	225,000	The Australian	
98th	2013	ANZ, ONE	(Northern Ireland) Rory McIlroy	270	−18	1 stroke	(Australia) Adam Scott	225,000	Royal Sydney	
97th	2012	ANZ, ONE	(Australia) Peter Senior (2)	284	−4	1 stroke	(Australia) Brendan Jones	225,000	The Lakes	
96th	2011	ANZ, ONE	(Australia) Greg Chalmers (2)	275	−13	1 stroke	(Australia) John Senden	270,000	The Lakes	
Australian Open
95th	2010	ANZ, ONE	(Australia) Geoff Ogilvy	269	−19	4 strokes	(Australia) Matt Jones (Australia) Alistair Presnell	270,000	The Lakes	
94th	2009	ANZ, ONE	(Australia) Adam Scott	273	−15	5 strokes	(Australia) Stuart Appleby	270,000	New South Wales	
93rd	2008	ANZ	(South Africa) Tim Clark	279	−9	Playoff (Note: Clark won with a par on the first hole of a sudden-death playoff.)	(Australia) Mathew Goggin	270,000	Royal Sydney	
MFS Australian Open
92nd	2007	ANZ	(Australia) Craig Parry	277	−11	1 stroke	(Australia) Won Joon Lee (Australia) Nick O'Hern (United States) Brandt Snedeker	315,000	The Australian	
91st	2006	ANZ	(Australia) John Senden	280	−8	1 stroke	(Australia) Geoff Ogilvy	270,000	Royal Sydney	
90th	2005	ANZ	(Australia) Robert Allenby (2)	284	−4	1 stroke	(Australia) Nick O'Hern (Australia) John Senden (Australia) Paul Sheehan	216,000	Moonah Links	
Hillross Australian Open
89th	2004	ANZ	(Australia) Peter Lonard (2)	281	−3	1 stroke	(Australia) Stuart Appleby	270,000	The Australian	
88th	2003	ANZ	(Australia) Peter Lonard	279	−9	1 stroke	(Australia) Chris Downes (Australia) Stephen Leaney	270,000	Moonah Links	
Holden Australian Open
87th	2002	ANZ	(Australia) Stephen Allan	198 (Note: Shortened to 54 holes due to weather.)	−12	1 stroke	(Australia) Aaron Baddeley (United States) Rich Beem (Australia) Craig Parry	270,000	Victoria	
86th	2001	ANZ	(Australia) Stuart Appleby	271	−13	3 strokes	(Australia) Scott Laycock	270,000	The Grand	
85th	2000	ANZ	(Australia) Aaron Baddeley (2)	278	−10	2 strokes	(Australia) Robert Allenby	250,000	Kingston Heath	
84th	1999	ANZ	(Australia) Aaron Baddeley (a)	274	−14	2 strokes	(Australia) Greg Norman (Australia) Nick O'Hern	180,000	Royal Sydney	
83rd	1998	ANZ	(Australia) Greg Chalmers	288	E	1 stroke	(Australia) Stuart Appleby (Australia) Peter Senior	115,200	Royal Adelaide	
82nd	1997	ANZ	(England) Lee Westwood	274	−14	Playoff (Note: Westwood won with a par on the fourth hole of a sudden-death playoff.)	(Australia) Greg Norman	180,000	Metropolitan	
81st	1996	ANZ	(Australia) Greg Norman (5)	280	−8	8 strokes	(Australia) Wayne Grady	153,000	The Australian	
Heineken Australian Open
80th	1995	ANZ	(Australia) Greg Norman (4)	278	−10	2 strokes	(Australia) Peter McWhinney	114,750	Kingston Heath	
79th	1994	ANZ	(Australia) Robert Allenby	280	−8	1 stroke	(Australia) Brett Ogle	115,000	Royal Sydney	
78th	1993	ANZ	(United States) Brad Faxon	275	−13	2 strokes	(Australia) Mike Clayton (Australia) Jeff Woodland	153,000	Metropolitan	
Australian Open
77th	1992	ANZ	(Australia) Steve Elkington	280	−8	2 strokes	(Australia) Peter McWhinney (United States) Duffy Waldorf	144,000	The Lakes	
76th	1991	ANZ	(Australia) Wayne Riley	285	−3	1 stroke	(Australia) Robert Allenby (a)	126,000	Royal Melbourne	
75th	1990	ANZ	(United States) John Morse	283	−5	Playoff (Note: Morse won with a par on the first hole of a sudden-death playoff.)	(Australia) Craig Parry	108,000	The Australian	
74th	1989	ANZ	(Australia) Peter Senior	271	−17	7 strokes	(Australia) Peter Fowler	90,000	Kingston Heath	
National Panasonic Australian Open
73rd	1988	ANZ	(United States) Mark Calcavecchia	269	−19	6 strokes	(United States) Mark McCumber	63,000	Royal Sydney	
72nd	1987	ANZ	(Australia) Greg Norman (3)	273	−15	10 strokes	(Scotland) Sandy Lyle	54,000	Royal Melbourne	
71st	1986	ANZ	(Australia) Rodger Davis	278	−10	1 stroke	(Australia) Ian Baker-Finch (Australia) Graham Marsh (Australia) Bob Shearer	49,500	Metropolitan	
70th	1985	ANZ	(Australia) Greg Norman (2)	212	−4	2 strokes	(Australia) Ossie Moore	45,000	Royal Melbourne	
69th	1984	ANZ	(United States) Tom Watson	281	−7	1 stroke	(Australia) Bob Stanton	36,000	Royal Melbourne	
Australian Open
68th	1983	ANZ	(Australia) Peter Fowler	285	−3	3 strokes	(Australia) Ian Baker-Finch	27,000	Kingston Heath	
67th	1982	ANZ	(Australia) Bob Shearer	287	−1	4 strokes	(United States) Jack Nicklaus (United States) Payne Stewart	40,500	The Australian	
66th	1981	ANZ	(United States) Bill Rogers	282	−6	1 stroke	(Australia) Greg Norman	27,000	Victoria	
Dunhill Australian Open
65th	1980	ANZ	(Australia) Greg Norman	284	−4	1 stroke	(Australia) Brian Jones	35,000	The Lakes	
64th	1979	ANZ	(Australia) Jack Newton	288	E	1 stroke	(Australia) Graham Marsh (Australia) Greg Norman	30,000	Metropolitan	
Australian Open
63rd	1978	ANZ	(United States) Jack Nicklaus (6)	284	−4	6 strokes	(United States) Ben Crenshaw	44,000	The Australian	
62nd	1977	ANZ	(Australia) David Graham	284	−4	3 strokes	(United States) Don January (United States) Bruce Lietzke (New Zealand) John Lister	36,000	The Australian	
61st	1976	ANZ	(United States) Jack Nicklaus (5)	286	−2	4 strokes	(United States) Curtis Strange	32,000	The Australian	
60th	1975	ANZ	(United States) Jack Nicklaus (4)	279	−9	3 strokes	(United States) Bill Brask	8,820	The Australian	
Qantas Australian Open
59th	1974	ANZ	(South Africa) Gary Player (7)	277	−11	3 strokes	(Scotland) Norman Wood		Lake Karrinyup	
58th	1973	ANZ	(United States) J. C. Snead	280	−8	2 strokes	(United States) Jerry Breaux	4,000	Royal Queensland	
57th	1972		(Australia) Peter Thomson (3)	281	−7	Playoff (Note: Thomson won the title following an 18-hole playoff; Thomson 68, Graham 74.)	(Australia) David Graham	3,600	Kooyonga	
56th	1971		(United States) Jack Nicklaus (3)	269	−19	8 strokes	(Australia) Bruce Crampton	3,600	Royal Hobart	
55th	1970		(South Africa) Gary Player (6)	280	−8	3 strokes	(Australia) Bruce Devlin	3,000	Kingston Heath	
54th	1969		(South Africa) Gary Player (5)	288	E	1 stroke	(England) Guy Wolstenholme	2,500	Royal Sydney	
Australian Open
53rd	1968		(United States) Jack Nicklaus (2)	270	−18	1 stroke	(South Africa) Gary Player	2,500	Lake Karrinyup	
52nd	1967		(Australia) Peter Thomson (2)	281	−11	7 strokes	(Australia) Col Johnston	1,600	Commonwealth	
51st	1966		(United States) Arnold Palmer	276	−20	5 strokes	(Australia) Kel Nagle	1,600	Royal Queensland	
50th	1965		(South Africa) Gary Player (4)	264	−28	6 strokes	(United States) Jack Nicklaus (Australia) Frank Phillips		Kooyonga	
49th	1964		(United States) Jack Nicklaus	287	−1	Playoff (Note: Nicklaus won the title following an 18-hole playoff; Nicklaus 67, Devlin 70.)	(Australia) Bruce Devlin		The Lakes	
48th	1963		(South Africa) Gary Player (3)	278	−18	7 strokes	(Australia) Bruce Devlin		Royal Melbourne	
47th	1962		(South Africa) Gary Player (2)	281		2 strokes	(Australia) Kel Nagle		Royal Adelaide	
46th	1961		(Australia) Frank Phillips (2)	275		2 strokes	(Australia) Kel Nagle		Victoria	
45th	1960		(Australia) Bruce Devlin (a)	282		1 stroke	(Australia) Ted Ball (a)		Lake Karrinyup	
44th	1959		(Australia) Kel Nagle	284		5 strokes	(Australia) Vic Bulgin (a) (Australia) John Sullivan		The Australian	
43rd	1958		(South Africa) Gary Player	271		5 strokes	(Australia) Kel Nagle		Kooyonga	
42nd	1957		(Australia) Frank Phillips	287		1 stroke	(Australia) Ossie Pickworth (South Africa) Gary Player		Kingston Heath	
41st	1956		(Australia) Bruce Crampton	289		2 strokes	(Australia) Kel Nagle		Royal Sydney	
40th	1955		(South Africa) Bobby Locke	290		1 stroke	(Australia) Kel Nagle (Australia) Norman Von Nida		Gailes	
39th	1954		(Australia) Ossie Pickworth (4)	280		8 strokes	(Australia) Norman Von Nida		Kooyonga	
38th	1953		(Australia) Norman Von Nida (3)	278		2 strokes	(Australia) Peter Thomson		Royal Melbourne	
37th	1952		(Australia) Norman Von Nida (2)	278		5 strokes	(Australia) Ossie Pickworth		Lake Karrinyup	
36th	1951		(Australia) Peter Thomson	283		4 strokes	(Australia) Norman Von Nida		Metropolitan	
35th	1950		(Australia) Norman Von Nida	286		1 stroke	(Australia) Peter Thomson		Kooyonga	
34th	1949		(Australia) Eric Cremin	287		7 strokes	(Australia) Norman Von Nida		The Australian	
33rd	1948		(Australia) Ossie Pickworth (3)	289		Playoff (Note: Pickworth won the title following an 18-hole playoff; Pickworth 71, Ferrier 74)	(Australia) Jim Ferrier		Kingston Heath	
32nd	1947		(Australia) Ossie Pickworth (2)	285		5 strokes	(Australia) Billy McWilliam		Royal Queensland	
31st	1946		(Australia) Ossie Pickworth	289		2 strokes	(Australia) Alan Waterson (a)		Royal Sydney	
1940–1945: No tournament due to World War II
30th	1939		(Australia) Jim Ferrier (a) (2)	285		2 strokes	(Australia) Norman Von Nida (Australia) Martin Smith		Royal Melbourne	
29th	1938		(Australia) Jim Ferrier (a)	283		14 strokes	(Australia) Norman Von Nida		Royal Adelaide	
28th	1937		(Australia) George Naismith	299		1 stroke	(Australia) Doug Davies (a) (Australia) Tom McKay (a) (Australia) Ossie Walker		The Australian	
27th	1936		(United States) Gene Sarazen	282		4 strokes	(Australia) Harry Williams (a)		Metropolitan	
26th	1935		(Australia) Fergus McMahon	293		1 stroke	(Australia) Jim Ferrier (a)		Royal Adelaide	
25th	1934		(Australia) Billy Bolger	283		3 strokes	(United States) Gene Sarazen		Royal Sydney	
24th	1933		(Australia) Lou Kelly	302		3 strokes	(Australia) Jim Ferrier (a) (Australia) Gus Jackson (a) (Australia) Reg Jupp		Royal Melbourne	
23rd	1932		(Australia) Mick Ryan (a)	296		1 stroke	(Australia) Fergus McMahon		Royal Adelaide	
22nd	1931		(Australia) Ivo Whitton (a) (5)	301		1 stroke	(Australia) Jim Ferrier (a)		The Australian	
21st	1930		(Australia) Frank Eyre	306		7 strokes	(Australia) George Fawcett (a) (Australia) Rufus Stewart		Metropolitan	
20th	1929		(Australia) Ivo Whitton (a) (4)	309		5 strokes	(Australia) Frank Eyre (Australia) Rufus Stewart		Royal Adelaide	
19th	1928		(Australia) Fred Popplewell (2)	295		1 stroke	(Australia) Rufus Stewart		Royal Sydney	
18th	1927		(Australia) Rufus Stewart	297		2 strokes	(Australia) Harry Sinclair		Royal Melbourne	
17th	1926		(Australia) Ivo Whitton (a) (3)	297		3 strokes	(Australia) Rufus Stewart		Royal Adelaide	
16th	1925		(Australia) Fred Popplewell	299		2 strokes	(Australia) Tom Howard		The Australian	
15th	1924		(Australia) Alex Russell (a)	303		2 strokes	(Australia) Carnegie Clark		Royal Melbourne	
14th	1923		(Australia) Tom Howard	301		3 strokes	(England) Arthur Ham		Royal Adelaide	
13th	1922		(Australia) Charlie Campbell	307		3 strokes	(Australia) Arthur Le Fevre		Royal Sydney	
12th	1921		(Australia) Arthur Le Fevre	295		10 strokes	(Australia) Tom Rutledge (a)		Royal Melbourne	
11th	1920		(Australia) Joe Kirkwood Sr.	290		5 strokes	(Scotland) Dan Soutar		The Australian	
1914–1919: No tournament due to World War I
10th	1913		(Australia) Ivo Whitton (a) (2)	302		3 strokes	(Australia) Audley Lemprière (a)		Royal Melbourne	
9th	1912		(Australia) Ivo Whitton (a)	321		5 strokes	(Scotland) Dan Soutar (Australia) Fred Popplewell		Royal Melbourne	
8th	1911		(Australia) Carnegie Clark (3)	321		1 stroke	(Australia) Fred Popplewell		Royal Sydney	
7th	1910		(Australia) Carnegie Clark (2)	306		11 strokes	(Scotland) Dan Soutar		Royal Adelaide	
6th	1909		(Australia) Claude Felstead (a)	316		2 strokes	(Scotland) Dan Soutar		Royal Melbourne	
5th	1908		(Australia) Clyde Pearce (a)	311		3 strokes	(Scotland) Dan Soutar		The Australian	
4th	1907		(England) Michael Scott (a) (2)	318		8 strokes	(Scotland) Dan Soutar		Royal Melbourne	
3rd	1906		(Australia) Carnegie Clark	322		5 strokes	(Scotland) Dan Soutar		Royal Sydney	
2nd	1905		(Scotland) Dan Soutar	337		10 strokes	(England) Michael Scott (a)		Royal Melbourne	
1st	1904		(England) Michael Scott (a)	315		8 strokes	(Australia) Leslie Penfold Hyland (a)		The Australian	

== Future sites ==
Year	Course	Location	Dates
2026	Kingston Heath Golf Club	Cheltenham	3-6 December 2026
2027	Peninsula Kingswood Country Golf Club	Frankston	TBC

== See also ==
- Women's Australian Open
- Australian Amateur
- Australian Boys' Amateur
- Open golf tournament
