= Metropolitan Golf Club =

Coordinates: 37.9119°S 145.0902°E

Club information
- Location: South Oakleigh, Victoria, Australia
- Established: 1908
- Type: Private
- Tota holes: 18
- Tournaments: Australian Open; Australian PGA Championship; Australian Masters; Victorian Open; Women's Australian Open; Australian Amateur; Australian Women's Amateur
- Website: www.metropolitangolf.com.au
- Par: 72
- Length: 6,556 metres (7,170 yd)
- Course rating: 74.0
- Slope rating: 131

The Metropolitan Golf Club is one of the renowned sandbelt courses of Melbourne and is widely recognised as one of the finest championship courses in Australia. It is located in Oakleigh South, in the city's south-eastern suburbs, approximately twenty minutes' drive from the CBD.

== History ==
Metropolitan Golf Club shares its origins with Royal Melbourne Golf Club, which was founded in 1891 as Melbourne Golf Club, with the Royal title being granted in 1895. When the original course at Caulfield was turned over to housing, Royal Melbourne moved to a new course at Sandringham. Members who remained formed the Caulfield Golf Club, and in 1906 purchased a farm in Oakleigh with a two-storey house. In 1908 they moved to the new course, designed by club member J B MacKenzie, renaming their club as The Metropolitan Golf Club. In 1960, several holes were lost in order to build a school, with replacement holes designed by Dick Wilson being built on adjacent land.

== Course ==
Metropolitan enjoys a reputation as one of the best conditioned year-round courses in Australia. Prior to the 1997 Australian Open, Greg Norman described Metropolitan's pure couch grass fairways as the best he had played on anywhere in the world. During the 2001 WGC-Accenture Match Play Championship, a number of the world's top-ranked players compared the condition of the course to Augusta National. The bentgrass greens are large, firm and fast and are hand-mown right to the edge of the greenside bunkers. In total, there are 103 bunkers on the course and almost every hole is flanked by huge stands of Australian native trees which provide sanctuary to many species of native birds, including the noisy but beautiful sulphur-crested cockatoo and the multi-coloured rainbow lorikeet.

== Tournament history ==
The Metropolitan hosted the Kirk-Windeyer Cup in 1929, the Australian Open in 1930, and the Melbourne Centenary Open in 1934. The Australian Open returned in 1934 when it was won by Gene Sarazen, and again in 1951, when Peter Thomson was victorious.

In 1968, Metropolitan hosted the Australian PGA Championship; the tournament was won by Kel Nagle, who defeated a strong field that included Arnold Palmer, Jack Nicklaus and Gary Player. In 1979, Jack Newton won the Australian Open at Metropolitan by one stroke from a young Greg Norman, who three-putted the final green. The Australian Open returned in 1986, with Rodger Davis celebrating a popular win, in 1993, when American Brad Faxon triumphed with a four-round score of 275 (13 under par), and in 1997, when English Ryder Cup star Lee Westwood defeated Norman on the fourth hole of a sudden-death playoff after Norman once again three-putted the final green.

In addition to the Australian Open (7 times) and the Australian PGA Championship (5 times), Metropolitan has hosted many other elite professional and amateur tournaments, including the Australian Amateur (5 times) and the Victorian Open, for which it was the regular venue in the early 1980s.

Metropolitan celebrated its centenary year in 2001 and hosted the 2001 WGC-Accenture Match Play Championship in the first week of January. Sixty-four of the highest ranked golfers in the world competed in elimination format for US$5 million and the Walter Hagen Cup, on the course Hagen described in 1930 as "by far the finest course I have played in Australia". Pre-tournament favorite and world number 2 Ernie Els was knocked out in the semi-final by little known Swede Pierre Fulke, who couldn't repeat his effort in the 36-hole final the next day in losing to American Steve Stricker 2 & 1.

In February 2009, Metropolitan hosted the Women's Australian Open, which marked 100 years of play on the course at Oakleigh. The event was won by England's Laura Davies

Metropolitan hosted the World Cup in November 2018.

Year	Tournament	Winner	Country (State)
1930	Australian Open	Frank Eyre	New South Wales
1930	Australian PGA Championship	Jock Robertson	New South Wales
1930	Australian Amateur	Harry Hattersley	New South Wales
1934	Melbourne Centenary Tournament	Jimmy Thomson	United States
1936	Australian Open	Gene Sarazen	United States
1936	Australian PGA Championship	Bill Clifford	Victoria
1936	Australian Amateur	Jim Ferrier	New South Wales
1937	Australian Women's Amateur	B. Kernot	Victoria
1948	Australian Amateur	Doug Bachli	Victoria
1951	Australian Open	Peter Thomson	Victoria
1951	Australian PGA Championship	Norman Von Nida	New South Wales
1960	Victorian Open	Jack Harris	Victoria
1967	Australian PGA Championship	Peter Thomson	Victoria
1968	Australian PGA Championship	Kel Nagle	New South Wales
1971	Australian Amateur	Randall Hicks	Victoria
1973	Australian Women's Amateur	Maisie Mooney	Ireland
1975	Victorian Open	Stewart Ginn	Victoria
1978	Victorian Open	Guy Wolstenholme	England
1979	Australian Open	Jack Newton	New South Wales
1980	Victorian Open	Guy Wolstenholme	England
1981	Victorian Open	Bill Dunk	New South Wales
1982	Victorian Open	Mike Clayton	Victoria
1983	Victorian Open	Bob Shearer	Victoria
1984	Victorian Open	Greg Norman	Queensland
1986	Australian Open	Rodger Davis	New South Wales
1993	Australian Open	Brad Faxon	United States
1997	Australian Open	Lee Westwood	England
2001	WGC-Accenture Match Play Championship	Steve Stricker	United States
2001	Australian Amateur	Andrew Buckle	Queensland
2001	Australian Women's Amateur	Helen Beatty	Western Australia
2009	Women's Australian Open	Laura Davies	England
2014	Australian Masters	Nick Cullen	South Australia
2016	Australian Amateur	Connor Syme	Scotland
2016	Australian Women's Amateur	Park Min-ji	South Korea
2018	World Cup	Belgium	

== See also ==
- List of links golf courses
