= New South Wales Golf Club =

Golf course in La Perouse, New South Wales

New South Wales Golf Course
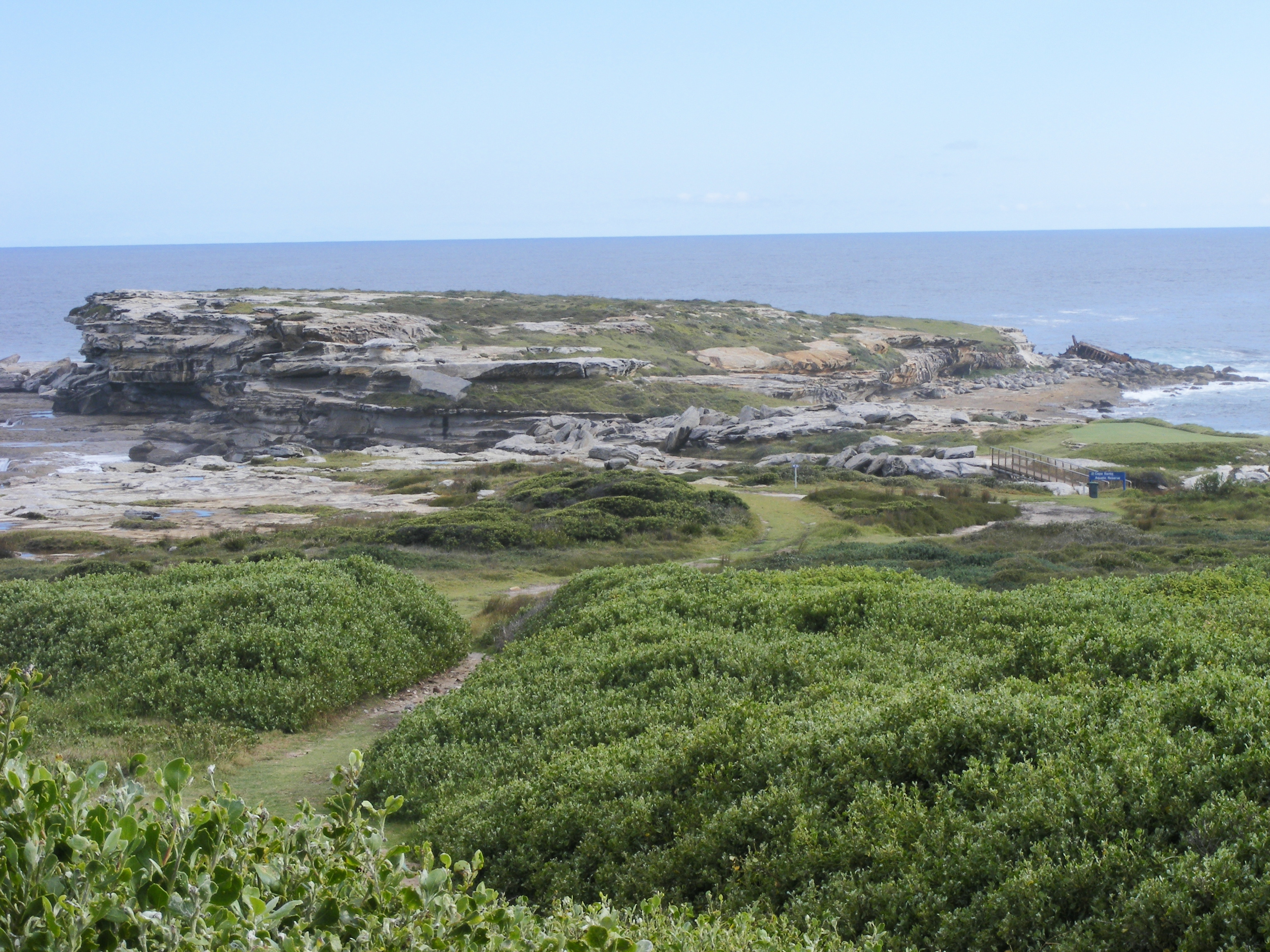
- Cape Banks in the distance on the edge of the Tasman Sea, with the 6th hole pictured, far right, with coastal heath in the foreground.

- Location in New South Wales
- 33°59′41″S 151°14′38″E

Club information
- Location: La Perouse, Sydney, New South Wales, Australia
- Established: December 1926
- Type: Private
- Owner: New South Wales Golf Club
- Tota holes: 18
- Tournaments: Australian Open
- Greens: Bent
- Fairways: Couch
- Website: http://www.nswgolfclub.com.au
- Designed by: Carnegie Clark & Alister MacKenzie
- Par: 72
- Length: 6,245 metres (20,489 ft)
- Course rating: ACR/USGA 74
- Slope rating: 135
- Course record: Amateur: Scott Arnold - 64 (2009); Professional: Elliot Boult - 64 (1994)

The New South Wales Golf Club is a links-style golf course designed by Alister MacKenzie and Carnegie Clark in December 1926. It consists of 18 holes, two of which are beside the Tasman Sea and Botany Bay. The course is situated in La Perouse, New South Wales, a suburb of Sydney, and regularly rates in the top 50 golf courses in the world.

MacKenzie, on designing the course, stated:

"At Sydney, I made an entirely new course for the New South Wales Golf Club at a place called La Perouse. This presents, I think, more spectacular views than any place I know with the possible exception of the new Cypress Point golf course in California."

— Alister MacKenzie, May 1927

A unique feature of the course design is that it has four par-five holes and four par-three holes and each of these is oriented north, south, east and west.

It has hosted numerous professional tournaments, including the 2009 Australian Open; won by Adam Scott.

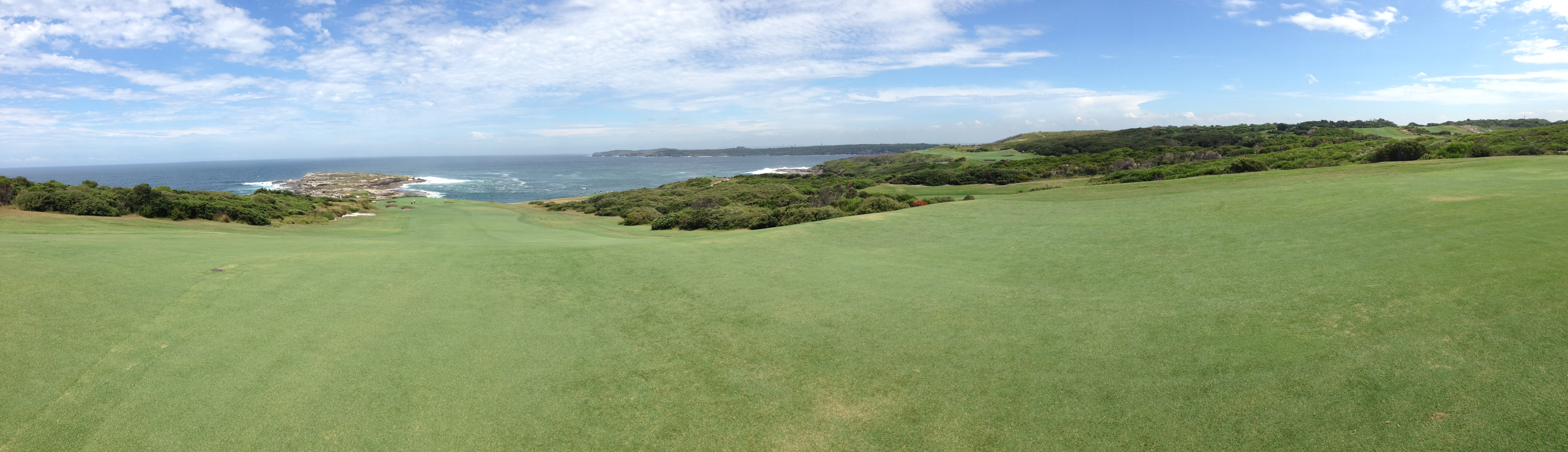
A panorama taken from the fifth fairway. In the distance is the fifth green, the sixth hole, the seventh tee, and the Tasman Sea. Holes on the back nine are off to the far right.

== See also ==
- List of links golf courses
- List of golf courses designed by Greg Norman
- Golf in Australia
