= Carnegie Clark =

Australian golfer and golf course architect

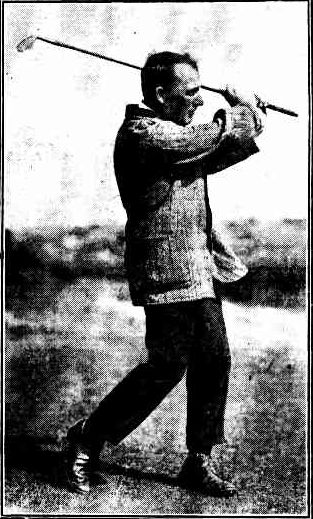
Carnegie Clark, the Australian Golfing Champion, 1911

Carnegie (Neg) Clark (1881–1959) was a champion golfer, golf club manufacturer, a golf course architect and an organiser of professional golf in Australia.

== Early life ==
Clark was born on 27 July 1881 in Carnoustie, Scotland. He was a member of The Carnoustie Golf Club. Clark's mother was the sister of Andrew Carnegie.

== Professional career ==
Clark began his career as a golf course designer. In 1904, he designed The Australian Golf Club with Jock Hutchison and Gilbert Martin. He also won a number of significant tournaments during this era including the Australian Open and Australian PGA Championship.

In 1911, Carnegie Clark organised a workshop at Royal Sydney Golf Club which resulted in the foundation of the Professional Golfers Association of Australia. Clark was its founding treasurer and served as president in 1920–1921.

Later on in his career, he designed many more courses in Australia. These include Royal Queensland Golf Club, Moore Park Golf Course, New South Wales Golf Club, and Moss Vale Golf Club. Clark retired in May 1930.

== Death ==
He died on 3 February 1959 aged 77 years.

== Tournament wins ==
- 1906 Australian Open
- 1908 Australian PGA Championship
- 1909 Australian PGA Championship
- 1910 Australian Open
- 1911 Australian Open
- 1924 Sun Tournament
