= Dan Soutar =

Daniel Gordon Soutar (3 December 1882 – 30 November 1937) was a professional golfer who played a significant role in the development of Australian golf. He was a native of Scotland who brought his expertise and dedication to the sport, impacting various aspects of the game in Australia, including playing, teaching, clubmaking, and course design.

== Writings ==
In 1906, Soutar wrote The Australian Golfer in which he described the country's best golfers and golf courses, his teaching methods and much more.

Jack Pollard's writing in his 1990 book Australian Golf – the Game and the Players described the photographs of Soutar swinging in The Australian Golfer: "Soutar had a long, sweeping swing, his supple wrists enabling him to take the club a long way back over his left shoulder before he hit the ball freely and gave it a full follow through. There was no jerk or hindrance in his swing and body turn, just a lovely free-flowing movement of the club. He was tall and fit, and usually wore a peaked cap or tam o’shanter."

== Amateur wins ==
- 1903 Australian Amateur, New South Wales Amateur
- 1904 New South Wales Amateur

== Professional wins ==
- 1905 Australian Open, Australian PGA Championship
- 1906 Australian PGA Championship
- 1907 Australian PGA Championship
- 1910 Australian PGA Championship
- 1922 Victorian PGA Championship
- 1926 New South Wales PGA Championship
- 1931 Dunlop Cup (New South Wales)
- 1934 Dunlop Cup (New South Wales)

== Team appearances ==
Amateur

- Australian Men's Interstate Teams Matches (representing New South Wales): 1904 (winners)
