= Royal Sydney Golf Club =

Golf club in Sydney, New South Wales

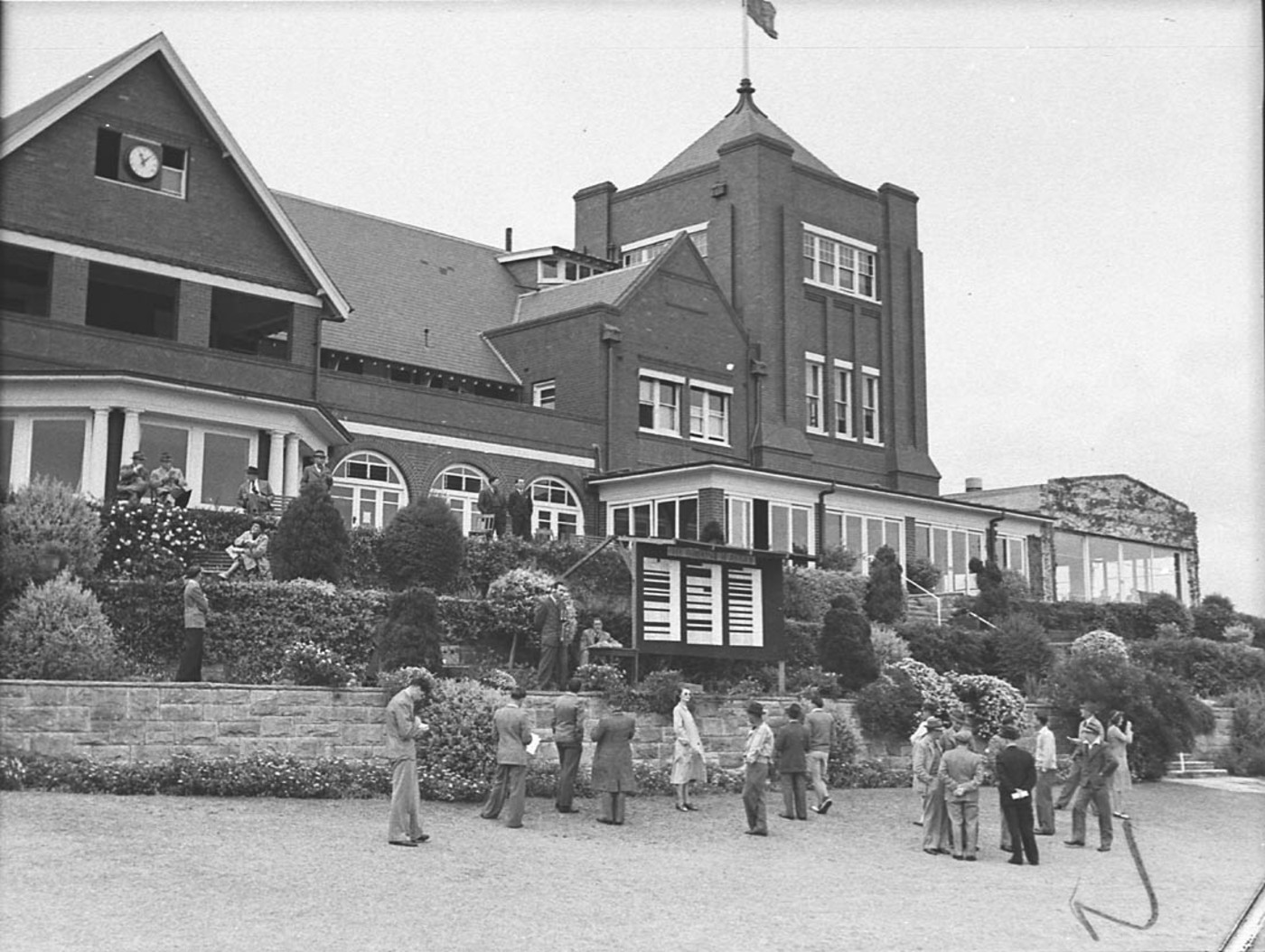
- Interactive map of Royal Sydney Golf Club
- 33°52′23″S 151°15′58″E

Club information
- Location: Kent Road, Rose Bay
- Established: 1893
- Type: Private
- Tournaments: Australian Open (golf), Australian PGA Championship (golf), Davis Cup (tennis)
- Website: The Royal Sydney Golf Club

Royal Sydney Golf Club is a golf club in Rose Bay, New South Wales, Australia, a suburb of Sydney.

Founded in 1893, Royal Sydney is one of Australia's premier sporting and social clubs. It features an 18-hole Championship Course, a 9-hole Centenary Course, golf practice areas, a golf teaching studio, 18 tennis courts, bowling greens, roquet lawns, a squash court, a Fitness Centre as well as a Clubhouse.

It has hosted the Australian Open on 15 occasions between 1906 and 2016.

== History ==
Royal Sydney was one of the earliest golf clubs founded in Australia, initially as 'Sydney Golf Club' in 1893, in Concord, New South Wales. Four years later, in 1897, Queen Victoria granted the Club its ‘Royal’ prefix. Tennis, billiards and croquet have been played since 1905 and bowls was introduced in 1929. The current Clubhouse was built in 1922 and, in 2003, was extensively renovated. In 2011, a fitness centre and swimming pool was built.

== Golf Courses ==
=== Championship Course ===
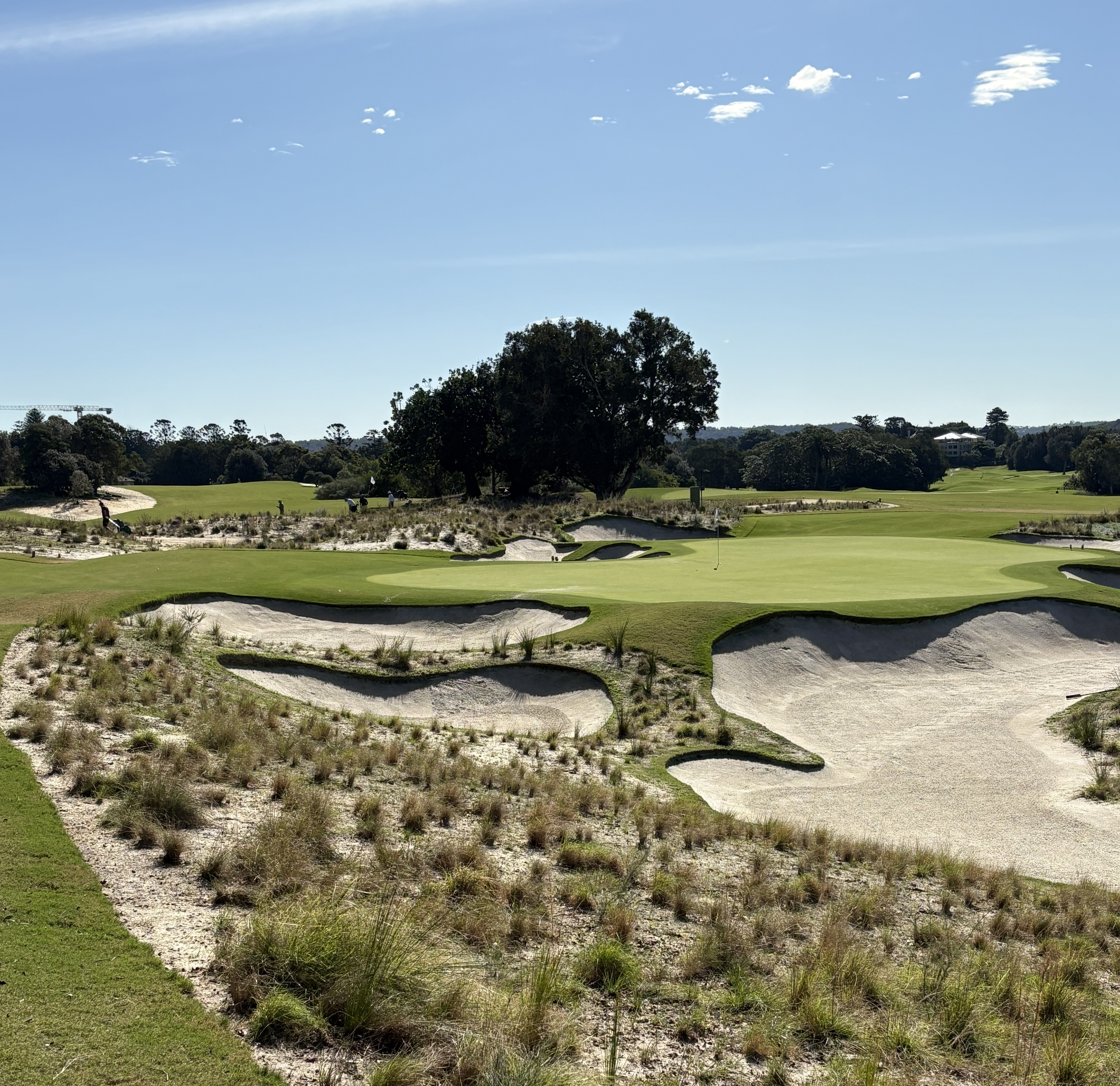
The 6th hole at the Bay Course (2025)

The Championship Course was described as "an ‘old-fashioned’, traditional, heavily bunkered, tough test of golf, especially in any wind. There are no gimmicks, no tricks, chasms or watery caverns". Its undulating fairways and treacherous bunkers (of which there are more than 120) ensure that the Championship Course is a challenge, even for the most avid golfer. A major renovation to the Championship course, led by Gil Hanse, was completed in 2025. The new course has been renamed the Bay Course.

=== Centenary Course ===
Royal Sydney also offers a 9-hole course called the Centenary Course. It was completely rebuilt to celebrate the 100th anniversary of the Club in 1997. The course was designed to utilise every golf club in the bag for the competent golfer with dynamic terrain, featuring tight fairways and small contoured greens. Water comes into play on six of the nine holes, presenting a further challenge for golfers.

== Australian Open Championships ==
Royal Sydney has hosted the Australian Open on 15 occasions.

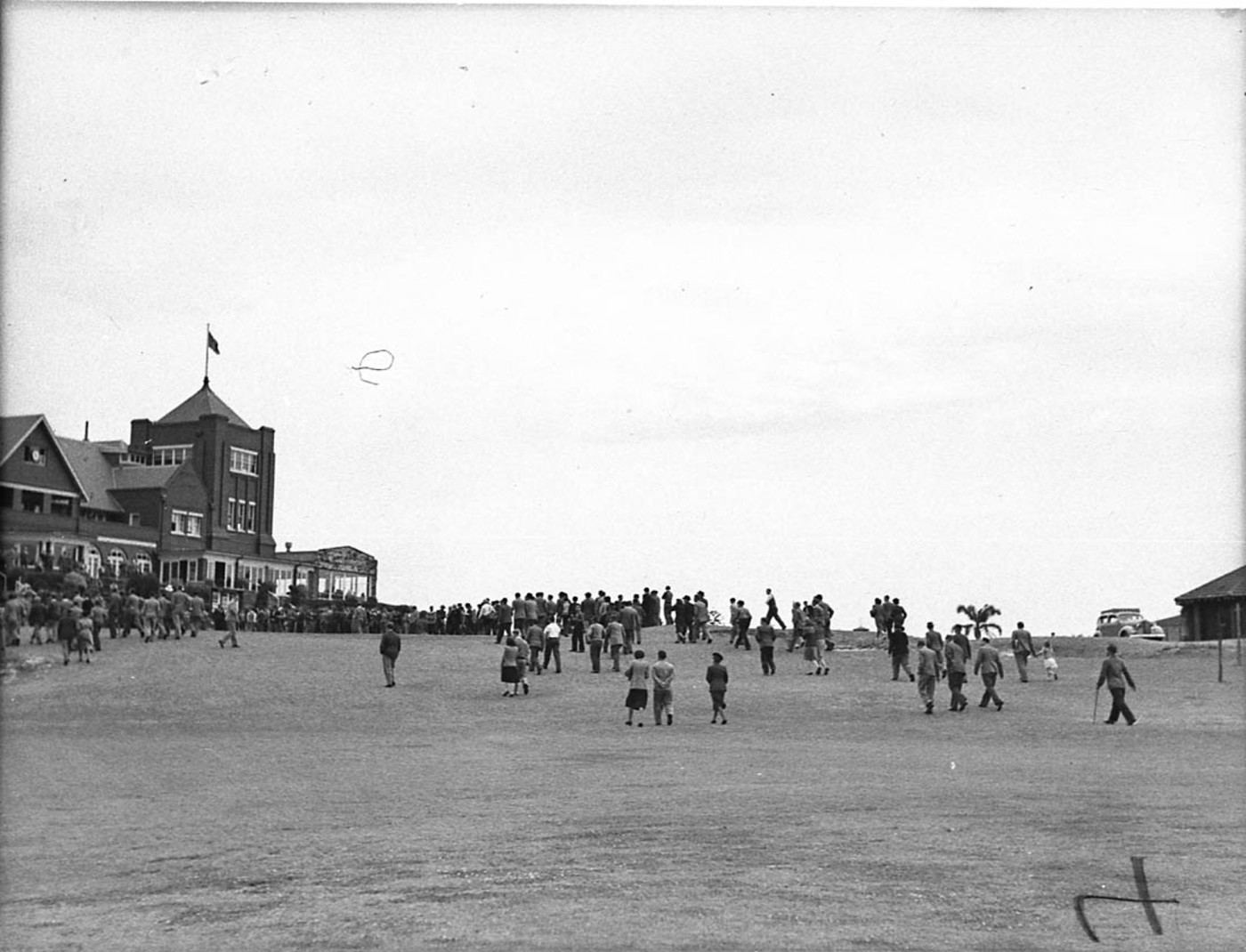
The 1946 Australian Open, held at Royal Sydney.

It has also hosted one Women's Australian Open, in 2007, won by Karrie Webb.

== Other Sports ==
=== Snooker ===
The Royal Sydney Golf Club maintains three Championship quality, full-size tables, which are some of the last remaining among Sydney's private clubs. The Club holds annual singles, doubles and handicap tournaments for snooker, along with a monthly "Lightning Snooker" competition, which takes place on the first Thursday of each month. The snooker room enjoys a strong patronage, with a dedicated Women's evening on Wednesdays and is a popular location following a round of golf or as a book-end to a dining reservation.

=== Tennis ===
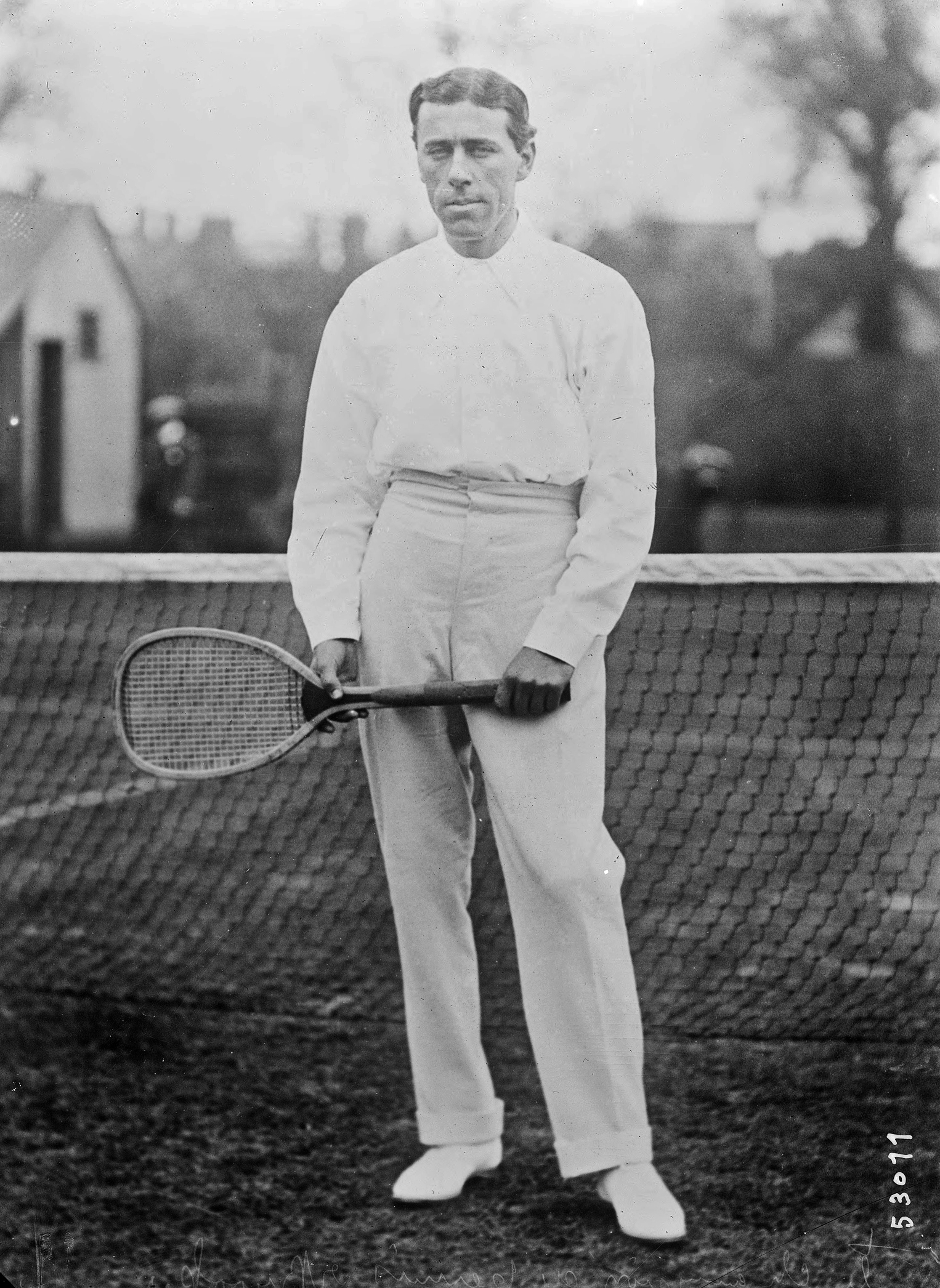
Sir Norman Brookes, winner of three Grand Slams, was a member of Royal Sydney.

Royal Sydney also possesses 18 tennis courts - 11 lawn courts and seven hard courts.

The Club has hosted many tournaments (most recently the 2011 Davis Cup tie between Australia and Switzerland) and produced a number of internationally successful players including Sir Norman Brookes and Gerald Patterson.

Although the starting date of tennis at Royal Sydney is unknown, historical records first indicate the existence of courts in 1905. The popularity of tennis grew and in 1913 another nine courts were laid. By 1920 there were twenty-five courts in play.

In July 2003, Royal Sydney hosted a ladies Federation Cup tie.

=== Croquet ===
The Royal Sydney Golf Club features two croquet lawns which are available for the use of members and their guests all year round. Croquet is a popular sport for many Royal Sydney members with competitions and social days held on a regular basis throughout the year. In March 2009, Royal Sydney hosted the Australian Croquet Championships, and in March 2015 welcomed the Eire Cup (Australian Association Croquet Championships).

=== Bowls ===
Bowls has been played at Royal Sydney since 1929. The Club currently has two bowling greens which are available for the use of members and their guests all year round. The greens are used both for competitive and social play.

=== Squash ===
Squash courts were first constructed at Royal Sydney in 1912. The Club was host to the New South Wales and Australian Championships several times during the 1930s when the game was riding a wave of popularity. Although the popularity of squash waned slightly in the latter part of the 1980s and 1990s, the Club still has a squash court for use by members all year round.

== See also ==
- List of golf clubs granted Royal status
- List of Australian organisations with royal patronage
