= Australian Amateur =

Amateur golf tournament

Tournament information
- Location: Australia
- Established: 1894
- Format: Stroke play (from 2021)

Current champion
- (Australia) Billy Dowling

The Australian Amateur is the national amateur golf championship of Australia. It has been played annually since 1894, except for the war years, and is organised by Golf Australia. Having traditionally been a match play event, from 2021 it has been a 72-hole stroke play event, having last been played as a stroke play event in 1907.

Originally played as the "Victorian Golf Cup" at Melbourne Golf Club, the championship was taken over by the Australian Golf Union in 1899. In its early years, a variety of formats were used but from 1908 to 2020 it was a match play event, generally with a stroke play qualifying stage. The winner receives the Challenge Cup, donated by Lord Forster, the Governor-General of Australia, and first presented to Legh Winser, the 1921 winner.

Three players have won the championship four times: Harry Howden between 1896 and 1901, Michael Scott between 1905 and 1910 and Jim Ferrier between 1935 and 1939. The last repeat winner was Doug Bachli who won his second title in 1962.

== History ==
The championship is reckoned to start in 1894 when the Royal Melbourne Golf Club founded the "Victorian Golf Cup", open to all amateurs in Australasia. The 1894 contest was played on 5, 7 and 9 November with the result decided by a bogey competition over three rounds. Louis Whyte won with a score of 6 holes down on bogey, 6 holes ahead of Mark Anderson. The same format was used for the 1895 event, which was played on 4, 6 and 8 November. Robert Balfour-Melville was even with bogey, 10 holes ahead of Thomas Hope. The Victorian Golf Cup had rapidly established itself as the main golf tournament in Australia, and was regarded as the amateur championship of Australia. The 1896 contest was held from 23 to 25 September and was decided by match-play with the final over 36 holes. Defending champion, Robert Balfour-Melville, met Harry Howden in the final. Howden was 4 up with 5 to play before Balfour-Melville levelled the match at the 35th. However Howden won the last to win by 1 hole. The match play format was not popular and the 1897 event was decided by 72 holes of stroke-play, played on 13 and 15 October. Harry Howden retained the trophy with a score of 348, 33 strokes ahead of William McIntyre. Howden led by 12 after the first day and extended this by a further 21 on the final day. The 1898 event was again decided by stroke-play. Harry Howden was three behind the leaders after the first day but pulled away on the final day and won with a score of 360, 13 ahead of his brother Jim.

The Australian Golf Union was formed in 1898 and organised their first championship meeting at Royal Sydney Golf Club, the main event being the amateur championship on 26 and 27 May 1899. Harry Howden and New Zealander Charles Gillies were level after the first day on 157. Howden led by a stroke after three rounds after Gillies had taken 11 at the fourth hole. The pair were still level with nine holes to play but Gillies came home in 37 to Howden's 48 to win with a total of 314, 11 ahead of Howden, who still took second place. The Victorian Golf Cup continued in 1899 and later, and despite some initial confusion, became established as the Victorian Amateur Championship. Unlike the earlier Victorian Golf Cup, the AGU championship meeting moved each year and in 1900 it was held at Adelaide Golf Club on 28 and 29 June. Louis Whyte won with a score of 382, four ahead of Walter Carre Riddell. The championship returned to the Sydney area in 1901, being played at The Australian Golf Club on 11 and 12 July. Harry Howden won with a score of 352, 7 strokes ahead of Hugh MacNeil, although he had trailed by 5 after the first day. The 1902 championship was played at Royal Melbourne on 22 and 23 October. Hugh MacNeil won with a score of 328, six ahead of Peter Anderson and Walter Carre Riddell. In 1903 the event returned to Adelaide Golf Club, played from 25 to 27 June. The format was revised, there being a 36-hole stroke-play qualification stage after which the leading 8 played match-play with a 36-hole final. Dan Soutar led the qualifying and went on to beat Jim Howden 3&1 in the final.

The first Australian Open was held in 1904 and acted as qualifying for the amateur championship. The leading 16 amateurs played in the match-play stage, over three days, with two 18-hole matches on the first day, followed by 36-hole semi-finals and final. Jim Howden beat Michael Scott 3&2 in the final, despite having finished 23 strokes behind him in the Open. The first Interstate team match was held in 1904, with New South Wales beating Victoria by five matches to two, with one match halved. When the meeting was held at Royal Melbourne in 1905 and 1907 there was no separate match-play stage, the amateur championship being won by the leading amateur in the Open. In 1905 Dan Soutar, a professional, won the Open with a score of 337, 10 strokes ahead of the runner-up, Scott, who therefore became the amateur champion. In 1907 Scott won the Open championship with a score of 318 becoming both open and amateur champion. Scott had to survive a protest, having accidentally driven from outside the teeing ground at one hole. The 1906 event had followed the same format as that in 1904. As in 1904. it was won by a player who had performed relatively poorly in the Open, Ernest Gill beating Clyde Pearce 5&4 in the final.

From 1908 only the leading 8 amateurs qualified for the match-play, with all three rounds played over 36 holes. Generally, the Open finished on a Saturday and the three rounds were played from Monday to Wednesday. In 1908, for scheduling reasons, the final was not played until the Saturday. The Tasmanian Clyde Pearce, having already won the Open, beat Neptune Christoe 10&8 in the final. In 1909 Pearce reached the final again but lost at the 37th hole to Michael Scott. Scott won his fourth title in 1910, beating Jim Howden 10&8 in the final. In 1911 the three match-play rounds were scheduled for Monday, Wednesday and Saturday. Scott had returned to Britain and Jim Howden won his second title, beating Claude Felstead 4&3 in the final. In 1912 the event was won by Hector Morrison, who beat Gordon Burnham, a member of the Governor-General's staff, 3&1 in the final. The 1913 tournament was originally planned to be played at The Australian, but was moved to Royal Melbourne because of a smallpox outbreak and the poor condition of the course, caused by wet weather. It was won by Audley Lemprière who beat Ivo Whitton 2&1 in the final, reversing the result in the Open, in which Whitton had won with Lemprière second.

The championship restarted in 1920 using the pre-war format. Eric Apperly beat Tom Howard 4&3 in the final, while in 1921 Legh Winser beat Bruce Pearce 6&5 in the final. In late 1921 it was announced that Lord Forster, the Governor-General of Australia, had given a Challenge Cup, to be held by the winner until the following championship. The cup was presented to Legh Winser, the 1921 champion, by Archibald Weigall, the Governor of South Australia, at a ceremony at Adelaide Golf Club in April 1922. Ivo Whitton had won the Open in 1912 and 1913 but it was not until 1922 that he won the amateur championship, beating Henry McClelland 3&2 in the final. He repeated his success in 1923 beating Harry Sinclair by the same score. There were 16 qualifiers in 1922, with four 36-hole matches, but the number reverted to 8 in 1923, before expanding again to 16 in 1924 where it stayed until 1939. Alex Russell had won the Open in 1924, beating Whitton on the way to the final, but lost 2&1 to Sinclair, the runner-up in 1923. Sinclair retained the title in 1925 beating George Thompson 12&10 in a one-sided final. Whitton won the Open for the third time in 1926 and then reached the final of the amateur, but was beaten by Len Nettlefold, 2 up. Nettlefold won again in 1928 but otherwise there no multiple winners up to 1934. In the 1920s there had been some variation in the days of the week when the Open and amateur were played but from 1930 they became standardised with the Open finishing on a Saturday and the Amateur being played from Monday to Thursday of the following week. The period from 1935 to 1939 was dominated by Jim Ferrier who won four times in the five years, 1935, 1936, 1938 and 1939. In 1938 he became the first player since Clyde Pearce in 1908 to win both the Open and amateur, a feat he repeated in 1939. His only defeat in this period came in the 1937 quarter-finals where he lost 2&1 to Doug Davies. Harry Williams, the 1931 winner, won again in 1937.

When the championship resumed in 1946 it was played at Royal Sydney, after the Australian Open that had been played there. However, the Open no longer acted as a qualifying event and the amateur championship became match-play only with 18-hole matches except for the final. Alan Waterson beat Jim Pendergast 2&1 in the final. From 1947 the Open and amateur were generally played at different clubs, although they were often played in the same city with the amateur either immediately before or after the Open. Harry Hattersley won his second championship in 1947, 17 years after his first. In 1952 both Open and Amateur championships were held at Lake Karrinyup, the first time either had been held in Western Australia. The format for the amateur championship was revised with a 36-hole stroke-play qualifying event with the leading 32 players playing in the match-play stage. Bob Stevens led the qualifiers with a score of 141 and went on to win the title, beating Bill Higgins 7&6 in the final. Peter Heard won in 1953, having previously won in 1951. The format was revised for 1954 with the event taking place immediately after the Open. The leading 32 amateurs after the first two rounds of the Open qualified, all matches being over 36 holes. The six members of the Australian team that won the Commonwealth Tournament returned in time to play in the amateur championship but too late to play in the Open, and were excluded. The Toogood brothers met in the 1954 final, with Peter beating his brother John, leading to the famous headline "Toogood Was Too Good For Toogood". Harry Berwick was another two-time winner, in 1950 and 1956, beating Bill Edgar in the final on both occasions.

1958 had seen a return to the earlier match-play-only format with 18-hole matches except for the final, but it had not proved popular. In 1959, 36-hole stroke-play qualifying was introduced with the leading 64 players playing in the match-play stage. In 1959 Jack Coogan led the qualifying but lost in the final to Bruce Devlin. Doug Bachli won in 1962, having previously won in 1948. The 1963 event was played soon after the 1963 Commonwealth Tournament in Sydney, resulting in an unusually large number of overseas entries. Two South Africans reached the final, with John Hayes winning a one-sided final. New Zealander Ross Murray reached the final in 1969 but lost 6&5 to Bob Shearer.

There had been some criticism that the existing format was not producing a high calibre of winners, and the format was revised. In 1971 the number of qualifiers was reduced to 16, with all the match-play contests over 36 holes. The change was not immediately successful since only one of the six members of the Australian team for the upcoming Commonwealth Tournament qualified for the match-play stage. For 1972 the number of qualifiers was increased to 32, with all matches still over 36 holes. Colin Kaye won in 1972, the first time a medallist had gone on to win the event since stroke-play qualifying had been introduced in 1959. 18-hole matches were reintroduced in 1973, with only the final over 36 holes. The number of qualifiers remained at 32. The experienced Tony Gresham reached four finals in the 1970s, although he only won once. He beat Chris Bonython at the 40th hole in 1977 but lost to Ray Jenner in 1973, Peter Sweeney in 1976 and Mike Clayton in 1978. Bonython and Terry Gale were other multiple finalists in the 1970s, Gale winning in 1974 and losing to Bonython in 1975.

New Zealander Brent Paterson reached the final in 1983 but lost to Wayne Smith, and it was not until 1985 that there was another overseas winner when Boonchu Ruangkit from Thailand beat Peter O'Malley in the final. Another New Zealander, Phil Aickin, reached the final in 1987 but lost to Brett Johns. In the 1990s there were a number of winners who went on to have successful professional career. Lucas Parsons won in 1991 and was followed by New Zealander, Michael Campbell, in 1992 and Greg Chalmers in 1993. The centenary championship in 1994 was held at Royal Sydney. The event was moved to March, having traditionally been held in the second half of the year, and was won by Englishman Warren Bennett. Mathew Goggin won in 1995, beating the US-based Jamie Crow in the final.

In 1996 the qualifying rounds were extended from 36 to 72 holes, although the number of qualifiers remained at 32. David Gleeson won in 1996 and was followed by Kim Felton, Brett Rumford and Brendan Jones from 1997 to 1999. The early 2000s saw two Scottish winners, Jack Doherty in 2003 and Eric Ramsay in 2005. In 2006 the stroke play stage was turned into a separate tournament, the Australian Amateur Stroke Play Championship. The main difference was that there was a playoff in the event of a tie, whereas previously medalist honours were shared. There was a playoff in four of the six years the events was held. Danny Willett was the only overseas winner of the Stroke Play Championship, winning in 2008, while Norwegian Anders Kristiansen won the Amateur Championship that year. Matt Jager was the only winner of the stroke play who went on to win the Amateur Championship, winning both in 2009. In 2012 the format returned to that used from 1959 to 1970, with the leading 64 players qualifying after 36 holes of stroke-play. Match-play rounds were over 18 holes except for the final, which was over 36 holes. Two courses were used for the stroke play stage, each player playing one round on each course. The 2010s saw a number of overseas winners, Marcel Schneider won in 2012, Tae Koh in 2014, Connor Syme in 2016, Keita Nakajima in 2018 and Conor Purcell in 2019.

From 2021 the event has been played as a 72-hole stroke play event. The 2021 championship was originally planned to be played in Melbourne in January but was rescheduled to February at Kooyonga Golf Club. Louis Dobbelaar won the championship by two strokes from Jeffrey Guan. Jack Thompson led by 5 shots at the start of the final round but took 82 and was later disqualified for signing for an incorrect score. The 2022 title was won by Connor McKinney who holed a long birdie putt at the first extra hole in a three-way playoff.

== Winners ==
Year	Winner	Score	To par	Margin of victory	Runner(s)-up	Venue	Ref.
2026	(Australia) Billy Dowling	264	−18	5 strokes	(Australia) Joshua Fuller	Western Australian & Wanneroo	
2025	(Australia) Jye Halls	275	−15	7 strokes	(Australia) Hamish Farquharson	Commonwealth & Cranbourne	
2024	(Australia) Quinnton Croker	268	−14	5 strokes	(Australia) Phoenix Campbell	Yarra Yarra & Keysborough	
2023	(New Zealand) Kazuma Kobori	273	−15	2 strokes	(England) Arron Edwards-Hill (Japan) Taishi Moto	New South Wales & St Michael's	
2022	(Australia) Connor McKinney	274	−10	Playoff (Note: McKinney won with a birdie on the first hole of a sudden-death playoff.)	(Australia) Jack Buchanan (New Zealand) James Hydes	Cranbourne	
2021	(Australia) Louis Dobbelaar	278	−10	2 strokes	(Australia) Jeffrey Guan	Kooyonga	

Year	Winner	Score	Runner-up	Venue	Ref.
2020	(Australia) Jediah Morgan	5 & 3	(Northern Ireland) Tom McKibbin	Royal Queensland	
2019	(Republic of Ireland) Conor Purcell	37 holes	(Australia) Nathan Barbieri	Woodlands & Spring Valley	
2018	(Japan) Keita Nakajima	4 & 3	(Australia) David Micheluzzi	Lake Karrinyup & Wanneroo	
2017	(Australia) Matias Sanchez	1 up	(Australia) Min Woo Lee	Yarra Yarra & Peninsula Kingswood	
2016	(Scotland) Connor Syme	3 & 2	(Australia) Travis Smyth	Metropolitan & Peninsula Kingswood	
2015	(Australia) Cameron Davis	37 holes	(New Zealand) Tyler Hodge	The Australian & The Lakes	
2014	(New Zealand) Tae Koh	6 & 5	(Australia) Curtis Luck	The Grange	
2013	(Australia) Cameron Smith	3 & 2	(Australia) Geoff Drakeford	Commonwealth & Woodlands	
2012	(Germany) Marcel Schneider	37 holes	(Australia) Daniel Nisbet	Woodlands & Huntingdale	
2011	(Australia) Matt Stieger	1 up	(New Zealand) Ben Campbell	Victoria & Woodlands	
2010	(Australia) Matt Jager	8 & 7	(New Zealand) Ben Campbell	Lake Karrinyup & Mount Lawley	
2009	(Australia) Scott Arnold	3 & 1	(Australia) Daniel Beckmann	Royal Queensland & Virginia	
2008	(Norway) Anders Kristiansen	7 & 6	(Australia) Michael Foster	Royal Adelaide & The Grange	
2007	(Australia) Rohan Blizard	3 & 2	(Australia) Justin Roach	New South Wales	
2006	(Australia) Tim Stewart	1 up	(Australia) Mitchell Brown	Royal Hobart & Tasmania	
2005	(Scotland) Eric Ramsay	6 & 5	(Australia) Andrew Tampion	Royal Melbourne & Woodlands	
2004	(Australia) Andrew Martin	2 & 1	(Australia) Jarrod Lyle	Royal Adelaide & Glenelg	
2003	(Scotland) Jack Doherty	5 & 4	(New Zealand) Bradley Iles	Mount Lawley & Royal Perth	
2002	(Australia) Kurt Barnes	2 & 1	(Australia) Michael Sim	Indooroopilly	
2001	(Australia) Andrew Buckle	7 & 6	(Australia) Marcus Both	Metropolitan & Kingston Heath	
2000	(Australia) Brad Lamb	2 up	(Australia) John Sutherland	Tasmania & Royal Hobart	
1999	(Australia) Brendan Jones	2 & 1	(New Zealand) Mahal Pearce	The Australian & The Lakes	
1998	(Australia) Brett Rumford	1 up	(Australia) Matthew Costigan	The Grange	
1997	(Australia) Kim Felton	8 & 7	(Australia) Derrin Morgan	Lake Karrinyup & Cottesloe	
1996	(Australia) David Gleeson	1 up	(Australia) Lester Peterson	Brisbane & Indooroopilly	
1995	(Australia) Mathew Goggin	3 & 2	(Australia) Jamie Crow	Huntingdale & Metropolitan	
1994	(England) Warren Bennett	2 & 1	(Australia) Jamie McCallum	Royal Sydney & The Australian	
1993	(Australia) Greg Chalmers	6 & 5	(Australia) Matthew Ecob	Royal Hobart & Tasmania	
1992	(New Zealand) Michael Campbell	4 & 3	(Australia) Jarrod Moseley	Royal Adelaide & Kooyonga	
1991	(Australia) Lucas Parsons	2 & 1	(Australia) Steve Collins	Lake Karrinyup & Royal Perth	
1990	(Australia) Chris Gray	3 & 2	(Australia) Robert Willis	Royal Queensland & Brisbane	
1989	(Australia) Steven Conran	2 up	(Australia) Paul Moloney	Victoria & Keysborough	
1988	(Australia) Stuart Bouvier	2 & 1	(Australia) David Ecob	Royal Canberra & Yowani	
1987	(Australia) Brett Johns	3 & 2	(New Zealand) Phil Aickin	Royal Hobart & Tasmania	
1986	(Australia) David Ecob	37 holes	(Australia) Lester Peterson	Glenelg & Kooyonga	
1985	(Thailand) Boonchu Ruangkit	2 & 1	(Australia) Peter O'Malley	Royal Perth	
1984	(Australia) Brad King	1 up	(Australia) Bill Guy	Royal Queensland	
1983	(Australia) Wayne Smith	37 holes	(New Zealand) Brent Paterson	Commonwealth	
1982	(Australia) Eric Couper	8 & 6	(Australia) Dave Bromley	The Australian	
1981	(Australia) Ossie Moore	8 & 7	(Australia) Col Lindsay	Royal Adelaide	
1980	(Australia) Roger Mackay	3 & 1	(Australia) Gerard Power	Tasmania	
1979	(Australia) John Kelly	37 holes	(Australia) Peter Sweeney	Royal Perth	
1978	(Australia) Mike Clayton	1 up	(Australia) Tony Gresham	Royal Queensland	
1977	(Australia) Tony Gresham	40 holes	(Australia) Chris Bonython	Victoria	
1976	(Australia) Peter Sweeney	5 & 4	(Australia) Tony Gresham	New South Wales	
1975	(Australia) Chris Bonython	1 up	(Australia) Terry Gale	Royal Adelaide	
1974	(Australia) Terry Gale	8 & 7	(Australia) Peter Wardrop	Royal Hobart	
1973	(Australia) Ray Jenner	4 & 2	(Australia) Tony Gresham	Lake Karrinyup	
1972	(Australia) Colin Kaye	37 holes	(Australia) Peter Headland	Gailes	
1971	(Australia) Randall Hicks	5 & 4	(Australia) Bill Wellington	Metropolitan	
1970	(Australia) Peter Bennett	2 up	(Australia) Paul Jones	The Australian	
1969	(Australia) Bob Shearer	6 & 5	(New Zealand) Ross Murray	Royal Adelaide	
1968	(Australia) Roy Stott	3 & 1	(Australia) Dennis Bell	Royal Hobart	
1967	(Australia) John Muller	1 up	(Australia) Graham Marsh	Royal Perth	
1966	(Australia) Bill Britten	2 & 1	(Australia) Vic Bulgin	Brisbane	
1965	(Australia) Kevin Donohoe	4 & 2	(Australia) Harry McGain	Royal Melbourne	
1964	(Australia) Barrie Baker	2 & 1	(Australia) Tom Crow	The Australian	
1963	(South Africa) John Hayes	8 & 7	(South Africa) Derek Kemp	Kingston Heath	
1962	(Australia) Doug Bachli (2)	7 & 6	(Australia) John Hood	Kooyonga	
1961	(Australia) Tom Crow	3 & 2	(Australia) Eric Routley	Royal Melbourne	
1960	(Australia) Ted Ball	5 & 4	(Australia) Harold Digney	Lake Karrinyup	
1959	(Australia) Bruce Devlin	2 up	(Australia) Jack Coogan	Royal Sydney	
1958	(Australia) Kevin Hartley	39 holes	(Australia) Noel Bartell	Royal Adelaide	
1957	(Australia) Barry Warren	3 & 1	(Australia) Bruce Devlin	Commonwealth	
1956	(Australia) Harry Berwick (2)	1 up	(Australia) Bill Edgar	The Australian	
1955	(Australia) Jack Rayner	4 & 2	(Australia) Barry Warren	Royal Queensland	
1954	(Australia) Peter Toogood	5 & 4	(Australia) John Toogood	Royal Adelaide	
1953	(Australia) Peter Heard (2)	8 & 7	(Australia) Jack Coogan	New South Wales	
1952	(Australia) Bob Stevens	7 & 6	(Australia) Bill Higgins	Lake Karrinyup	
1951	(Australia) Peter Heard	3 & 2	(Australia) Bill Higgins	Royal Melbourne	
1950	(Australia) Harry Berwick	4 & 3	(Australia) Bill Edgar	Royal Adelaide	
1949	(Australia) Bill Ackland-Horman	38 holes	(Australia) Bill Edgar	Royal Sydney	
1948	(Australia) Doug Bachli	7 & 6	(Australia) Peter Heard	Metropolitan	
1947	(Australia) Harry Hattersley (2)	1 up	(Australia) Bill Gluth	Royal Adelaide	
1946	(Australia) Alan Waterson	2 & 1	(Australia) Jim Pendergast	Royal Sydney	
1940–1945 No tournament due to World War II
1939	(Australia) Jim Ferrier (4)	6 & 5	(Australia) Harry Williams	Royal Melbourne	
1938	(Australia) Jim Ferrier (3)	8 & 6	(Australia) Dick Payne	Royal Adelaide	
1937	(Australia) Harry Williams (2)	1 up	(Australia) Tom Tanner	The Australian	
1936	(Australia) Jim Ferrier (2)	9 & 8	(Australia) Alex Rae	Metropolitan	
1935	(Australia) Jim Ferrier	2 & 1	(Australia) Harry Hattersley	Royal Adelaide	
1934	(Australia) Tom McKay	5 & 4	(Australia) Eric Apperly	Royal Sydney	
1933	(Scotland) William Hope	6 & 5	(Australia) Gus Jackson	Royal Melbourne	
1932	(Australia) Reg Bettington	2 & 1	(Australia) Harry Williams	Royal Adelaide	
1931	(Australia) Harry Williams	3 & 2	(Australia) George Thompson	The Australian	
1930	(Australia) Harry Hattersley	3 & 1	(Australia) Alex Russell	Metropolitan	
1929	(Australia) Mick Ryan	2 & 1	(Australia) Sloan Morpeth	Royal Adelaide	
1928	(Australia) Len Nettlefold (2)	4 & 2	(Australia) Stan Keane	Royal Sydney	
1927	(Australia) William Nankivell	38 holes	(Australia) Legh Winser	Royal Melbourne	
1926	(Australia) Len Nettlefold	2 up	(Australia) Ivo Whitton	Royal Adelaide	
1925	(Australia) Harry Sinclair (2)	12 & 10	(Australia) George Thompson	The Australian	
1924	(Australia) Harry Sinclair	2 & 1	(Australia) Alex Russell	Royal Melbourne	
1923	(Australia) Ivo Whitton (2)	3 & 2	(Australia) Harry Sinclair	Royal Adelaide	
1922	(Australia) Ivo Whitton	3 & 2	(Australia) Henry McClelland	Royal Sydney	
1921	(Australia) Legh Winser	6 & 5	(Australia) Bruce Pearce	Royal Melbourne	
1920	(Australia) Eric Apperly	4 & 3	(Australia) Tom Howard	The Australian	
1914–1919 No tournament due to World War I
1913	(Australia) Audley Lemprière	2 & 1	(Australia) Ivo Whitton	Royal Melbourne	
1912	(Australia) Hector Morrison	3 & 1	(England) Gordon Burnham	Royal Melbourne	
1911	(Scotland) Jim Howden (2)	4 & 3	(Australia) Claude Felstead	Royal Sydney	
1910	(England) Michael Scott (4)	10 & 8	(Scotland) Jim Howden	Adelaide	
1909	(England) Michael Scott (3)	37 holes	(Australia) Clyde Pearce	Royal Melbourne	
1908	(Australia) Clyde Pearce	10 & 8	(Australia) Neptune Christoe	The Australian	

Year	Winner	Score	Margin of victory	Runner(s)-up	Venue	Ref.
1907	(England) Michael Scott (2)	318	12 strokes	(Australia) Clyde Pearce	Royal Melbourne	
1906	(Australia) Ernest Gill	5 & 4		(Australia) Clyde Pearce	Royal Sydney	
1905	(England) Michael Scott	347	6 strokes	(Scotland) Jim Howden	Royal Melbourne	
1904	(Scotland) Jim Howden	3 & 2		(England) Michael Scott	The Australian	
1903	(Scotland) Dan Soutar	3 & 1		(Scotland) Jim Howden	Adelaide	
1902	(New Zealand) Hugh MacNeil	328	6 strokes	(Scotland) Peter Anderson (Australia) Walter Carre Riddell	Royal Melbourne	
1901	(Scotland) Harry Howden (4)	352	7 strokes	(New Zealand) Hugh MacNeil	The Australian	
1900	(Australia) Louis Whyte (2)	382	4 strokes	(Australia) Walter Carre Riddell	Adelaide	
1899	(New Zealand) Charles Gillies	314	11 strokes	(Scotland) Harry Howden	Royal Sydney	
Victorian Golf Cup
1898	(Scotland) Harry Howden (3)	360	13 strokes	(Scotland) Jim Howden	Royal Melbourne	
1897	(Scotland) Harry Howden (2)	348	33 strokes	(Australia) William McIntyre	Royal Melbourne	
1896	(Scotland) Harry Howden	1 up		(Australia) Robert Balfour-Melville	Royal Melbourne	
1895	(Australia) Robert Balfour-Melville	even	10 holes	(Australia) Thomas Hope	Royal Melbourne	
1894	(Australia) Louis Whyte	6 down	6 holes	(Australia) Mark Anderson	Melbourne	

All match-play finals have been over 36 holes. A number of early events used different formats. The 1894 and 1895 events were bogey competitions, decided over 3 rounds. From 1897 to 1902 and in 1905 and 1907 the championship was decided by 72 holes of stroke play.

Additional source:

== Medallists ==
From 1959 to 2020 the winner of the stroke play stage was the Australian Medallist. Qualifying was generally over 36 holes. However, from 1996 to 2005 it was played over 72 holes. Two courses were used from 1986.

- 2020 - Andre Lautee (134)
- 2019 - David Micheluzzi (127)
- 2018 - Darcy Boyd, Connor McKinney (135)
- 2017 - Kevin Yuan (138)
- 2016 - Charles Pilon (138)
- 2015 - Nick Marsh (136)
- 2014 - Ryan Evans (135)
- 2013 - Brady Watt (136)
- 2012 - Cameron Smith (141)
- 2006 to 2011 - replaced by the Australian Amateur Stroke Play Championship
- 2005 - Kang Sung-hoon (273)
- 2004 - Bradley Iles (282)
- 2003 - Mitchell Brown (280)
- 2002 - Andrew Buckle (277)
- 2001 - Steven Bowditch (283)
- 2000 - Warwick Dews (287)
- 1999 - Bradley Bone, Brendan Jones (288)
- 1998 - Kim Felton (284)
- 1997 - Daniel Gaunt, Terry Pilkadaris (281)
- 1996 - Jamie Crow (279)
- 1995 - Darren Anderson, Marcus Wheelhouse (142)
- 1994 - Jason Dawes (142)
- 1993 - Steve Collins, Anthony Toogood (138)
- 1992 - Stephen Leaney (138)
- 1991 - Lucas Parsons (140)
- 1990 - Shane Tait (140)
- 1989 - Tony Mills, John Wade (145)
- 1988 - John Wade, Robert Willis (145)
- 1987 - Glenn Joyner (145)
- 1986 - Craig Warren (142)
- 1985 - Brett Ogle (138)
- 1984 - John Hay (147)
- 1983 - Wayne Smith (142)
- 1982 - Ian Hood, Wayne Smith (149)
- 1981 - Tony Gresham (146)
- 1980 - Colin Kaye (145)
- 1979 - Colin Kaye (144)
- 1978 - Elliott Booth (146)
- 1977 - Tony Gresham, Colin Kaye (143)
- 1976 - Chris Bonython, Bruce Cook, Peter Sweeney, Doug Witham (148)
- 1975 - Tony Gresham (140)
- 1974 - Elliott Booth, Terry Gale (142)
- 1973 - Peter Headland (140)
- 1972 - Keith Drage, Colin Kaye, Sommy Mackay (144)
- 1971 - Mike Cahill (142)
- 1970 - Barry Warren (143)
- 1969 - David Good (141)
- 1968 - Barry Burgess, Duncan Grant, Bob Shearer (142)
- 1967 - Tony Gresham (140)
- 1966 - Vic Bulgin (143)
- 1965 - Kevin Hartley (140)
- 1964 - Noel Bartell (143)
- 1963 - Harry Berwick, Eric Routley (144)
- 1962 - Tony Hutton (147)
- 1961 - Phil Billings (139)
- 1960 - Les O'Shea (141)
- 1959 - Jack Coogan (141)

In 1960, Les O'Shea and Eric Routley tied for first place. There was an 18-hole playoff to determine the winner of the medal, O'Shea winning with a 74 to Routley's 76. The next tie was in 1963, when Routley was again involved, this time with Harry Berwick. On this occasion both players received medals.

== Australian Amateur Stroke Play Championship ==
From 2006 to 2011, the stroke play stage was a separate championship, the Australian Amateur Stroke Play Championship, although it also acted as the qualification for the Australian Amateur.

Year	Winner	Score	To par	Margin of victory	Runner(s)-up	Venue(s)	Ref.
Srixon Australian Men's Amateur Stroke Play Championship
2011	(Australia) Cameron Smith	275	−13	Playoff (Note: Smith won with a birdie on the first hole of a sudden-death playoff.)	(England) Dave Coupland	Victoria & Woodlands	
2010	(Australia) Matt Jager	276	−12	5 strokes	(Australia) Luke Bleumink (South Korea) Jin Jeong	Lake Karrinyup & Mount Lawley	
2009	(Australia) Bryden Macpherson	280	−7	Playoff (Note: Macpherson won with a birdie on the first hole of a sudden-death playoff.)	(South Korea) Jin Jeong	Royal Queensland & Virginia	
2008	(England) Danny Willett	285	−6	1 stroke	(Australia) Grant Scott (Australia) Josh Younger	Royal Adelaide & Grange	
Australian Men's Amateur Stroke Play Championship
2007	(Australia) Andrew Dodt	276	−4	Playoff (Note: Dodt won on the fourth hole of a sudden-death playoff.)	(Australia) Scott Arnold	New South Wales	
2006	(Australia) Jason Day	275	−16	Playoff (Note: Day won on the second hole of a sudden-death playoff.)	(Australia) Leighton Lyle	Royal Hobart & Tasmania	

Additional source:

== See also ==
- Australian Women's Amateur
