= Western Australian Open =

Golf tournament

WA Open
Tournament information
- Location: Inglewood, Western Australia, Australia
- Established: 1913
- Course: Secret Harbour Golf Links
- Par: 72
- Length: 6,799 yards (6,217 m)
- Tours: PGA Tour of Australasia; Von Nida Tour; Australasian Development Tour
- Format: Stroke play
- Prize fund: A$200,000
- Month played: October

Tournament record score
- Aggregate: 260 Deyen Lawson (2022)
- To par: −23 Ryan Fox (2014)

Current champion
- (Australia) James Marchesani

Location map
- Location in Australia Location in Western Australia

The Western Australian Open, also known as the WA Open, is a golf tournament on the PGA Tour of Australasia. It had been a tour event every year since 2009 with the exception of 2019.

== History ==
The first Western Australian Amateur Championship was held in 1911. This consisted of a 36-hole stroke-play qualification stage, played in a single day, followed by match-play to determine the champion. The leading four players in the stroke-play qualified in 1911, increasing to 8 in 1912. In 1913 the stroke-play stage was opened up to professionals, becoming the first Western Australian Open Championship. It was played at the Fremantle links on 28 August, nearly 30 players competing. In both 1911 and 1912, Norman Fowlie had led the stroke-play stage but in 1913 he was challenged by Clyde Pearce, who had won both the Australian Open and Australian Amateur in 1908, as well as losing the final three times in the amateur. Pearce won the Open with rounds of 77 and 78, three ahead of Fowlie who had rounds of 83 and 75. P. C. Anderson came third. The leading professional, David Dakers, came seventh. Pearce would go on to win the amateur championship as well.

The 1914 championship was again played on the Fremantle links in late August. Norman Fowlie reversed the 1913 result, winning by three strokes from Clyde Pearce, with rounds of 80 and 77. Two professionals entered but were well down the field.

Although the state amateur championship resumed in 1919, it was until not 1921 that the open championship was played again. Reg Forbes won with a score of 160. Three players tied for second place on 161, Arthur Geere, Percy Maunder and John Walker. Maunder won a prize of 5 guineas as leading professional, although a £10 prize was available for a professional winner. 1922 saw the first professional winner, Maunder's score of 161 beating Geere by a stroke. Maunder took the £10 first prize.

== Winners ==
Year	Tour (Note: ANZ − PGA Tour of Australasia; ANZDT − Australasian Development Tour; FT − Foundation Tour; VNT − Von Nida Tour.)	Winner	Score	To par	Margin of victory	Runner(s)-up	Venue	Ref.
WA Open
2026	ANZ	(Australia) James Marchesani	271	−17	1 stroke	(Australia) Jasper Stubbs	Secret Harbour	
Nexus Advisernet Bowra & O'Dea WA Open
2025	ANZ	(South Africa) Oliver Bekker	281	−7	1 stroke	(Australia) Cameron John	Mount Lawley	
Bowra & O'Dea Nexus Advisernet WA Open
2024	ANZ	(Australia) Elvis Smylie	265	−19	Playoff	(Australia) Jak Carter	Mandurah	
Nexus Advisernet/Bowra & O'Dea WA Open
2023	ANZ	(Australia) Simon Hawkes	271	−17	2 strokes	(Australia) Connor McKinney (Australia) Jason Norris	Joondalup	
Nexus Advisernet WA Open
2022 (Oct)	ANZ	(Australia) Deyen Lawson	260	−20	2 strokes	(Australia) Michael Sim	Western Australian	
2022 (May)	ANZ	(Australia) Braden Becker	269	−19	1 stroke	(Australia) Hayden Hopewell (a)	Royal Fremantle	
Nexus Risk WA Open
2021	ANZ	No tournament due to the COVID-19 pandemic						
2020		(Australia) Hayden Hopewell (a)	209	−7	1 stroke	(Australia) Haydn Barron (a)	Royal Fremantle	
2019		(Australia) Michael Sim	273	−15	1 stroke	(Australia) Hayden Hopewell (a)	Cottesloe	
Nexus Risk TSA Group WA Open
2018	ANZ	(Australia) Zach Murray (a)	272	−16	2 strokes	(Australia) David Micheluzzi (a)	Mount Lawley	
2017	ANZ	(Australia) Stephen Leaney (4)	273	−15	1 stroke	(Australia) Callan O'Reilly	Royal Perth	
2016	ANZ	(Australia) Curtis Luck (a)	261	−19	2 strokes	(Australia) Travis Smyth (a)	Western Australian	
2015	ANZ	(Australia) Daniel Fox	277	−11	3 strokes	(Australia) Curtis Luck (a)	Royal Fremantle	
John Hughes/Nexus Risk Services WA Open
2014	ANZ	(New Zealand) Ryan Fox	265	−23	6 strokes	(Australia) Stephen Dartnall	Cottesloe	
2013	ANZ	(New Zealand) Josh Geary	273	−15	5 strokes	(Australia) Kristopher Mueck	Mount Lawley	
John Hughes Geely/Nexus Risk Services WA Open
2012	ANZ	(Australia) Oliver Goss (a)	272	−16	Playoff (Note: Goss won at the fifth extra hole.)	(Australia) Brady Watt (a)	Royal Perth	
WA Open Championship
2011	ANZ	(Australia) Rohan Blizard	278	−10	2 strokes	(Australia) Ashley Hall (Australia) Matt Jager (Australia) David McKenzie	Royal Fremantle	
John Hughes Geely Nexus Risk Services WA Open
2010	ANZ	(Australia) Brad Kennedy	270	−10	1 stroke	(Australia) Rohan Blizard	Western Australian	
John Hughes Geely WA Open
2009	ANZ	(Australia) Michael Curtain	272	−16	4 strokes	(Australia) Kim Felton	Cottesloe	
Aspen Group WA Open Championship
2008	~~VNT~~	(Australia) James Nitties	135	−9	2 strokes	(Australia) Michael Dennis (a)	Cottesloe	
DJ Carmichael WA Open Championship
2007		(Australia) Simon Pope	142	−2	1 stroke	(Australia) Michael Foster (a) (Australia) Brady Watt (a)	Cottesloe	
Western Australian Open
2006		(Australia) Kim Felton	incorporated into the Nedlands Masters					
2005		(Australia) Brett Rumford	incorporated into the Nedlands Masters					
2004		(Australia) Stephen Leaney	incorporated into the Nedlands Masters					
2003		(Australia) Kim Felton	incorporated into the Nedlands Masters					
2002		(Australia) Stephen Leaney	incorporated into the Nedlands Masters					
2001	ANZDT	(Australia) Kim Felton	263	−17	Playoff	(Australia) David Diaz	Western Australian	
Heineken Western Australian Open
2000	ANZDT	(Australia) Paul Sheehan	283	−5	5 strokes	(Australia) Craig Carmichael (Australia) David Diaz	Lake Karrinyup	
Western Australian Open
1999	FT	(Australia) Brad King (2)	284	−4	2 strokes	(Australia) Mark Allen	Lake Karrinyup	
1998		(Australia) Tim Elliott	278		4 strokes	(Australia) Jarrod Moseley	Royal Perth	
1997		(Australia) Stephen Leaney (3)	273		3 strokes	(New Zealand) Elliot Boult	Mount Lawley	
1996	FT	(Australia) Brad King	276	−12	2 strokes	(New Zealand) Grant Moorhead	Lake Karrinyup	
1995	FT	(England) Ben Jackson	270		Playoff	(New Zealand) Grant Moorhead	Meadow Springs	
1994	FT	(Australia) Stephen Leaney (2)	276		2 strokes	(Australia) Greg Chalmers (a) (New Zealand) Michael Long (Australia) George Serhan	Meadow Springs	
1993		(New Zealand) Grant Moorhead	269		3 strokes	(Australia) Terry Price	Meadow Springs	
1992		(Australia) Leith Wastle	274		8 strokes	(Australia) Brad King	Meadow Springs	
1991		(Australia) Stephen Leaney (a)	271		2 strokes	(Australia) Glen Joyner	Meadow Springs	
1990		(Australia) Terry Gale (6)	208		5 strokes	(Australia) Brad Park (a)	Meadow Springs	
1989		(Australia) Ross Metherell (2)	145		1 stroke	(Australia) Stephen Leaney (a)	Meadow Springs	
Town and Country Western Australian Open
1988	ANZ	(Australia) Bradley Hughes	284	−4	1 stroke	(Australia) Ken Trimble	Lake Karrinyup	
National Panasonic Western Australian Open
1987	ANZ	(Australia) Gerry Taylor	290	+2	Playoff (Note: Taylor won at the second extra hole.)	(Australia) Brad King	Joondalup	
1986	ANZ	(Australia) Greg Norman	276	−12	1 stroke	(Australia) Terry Gale	Lake Karrinyup	
1985	ANZ	(Australia) Ian Stanley	276	−12	1 stroke	(Australia) Paul Foley	Royal Perth	
Town and Country WA-RAC Western Australian Open
1984	ANZ	(Australia) Ian Baker-Finch	272	−16	4 strokes	(Australia) Terry Gale	Royal Perth	
Town and Country Western Australian Open
1983	ANZ	(Australia) Terry Gale (5)	280	−8	Playoff (Note: Gale won at the second extra hole.)	(Australia) Jack Newton	Lake Karrinyup	
1982	ANZ	(Australia) Terry Gale (4)	275	−13	Playoff (Note: Gale won at the first extra hole.)	(Australia) Vaughan Somers	Mount Lawley	
Western Australian Open
1981		(Australia) Glenn Carbon (a)	146		1 stroke	(Australia) Graham Johnson	Melville Glades	
1980	ANZ	(Australia) Terry Gale (3)	286	−2	3 strokes	(Australia) Peter Randall	Royal Fremantle	
1979	ANZ	(United States) Peter Jacobsen	279	−9	5 strokes	(Australia) David Graham	Lake Karrinyup	
1978		(Australia) David Galloway	279	−9	3 strokes	(Australia) Peter Croker (Australia) Mike Ferguson (Australia) Ross Metherell	Mount Lawley	
1977		(Australia) Mike Ferguson	281	−7	3 strokes	(Australia) Barry Burgess (Australia) Vaughan Somers	Mount Lawley	
1976		(Australia) Graham Marsh (2)	274		10 strokes	(Australia) David Galloway	Lake Karrinyup	
1975		(Australia) Terry Gale (a) (2)	288		1 stroke	(Australia) Graham Johnson	Western Australian	
1974		(Australia) Ross Metherell	285		4 strokes	(Australia) Terry Gale (a)	Gosnells	
1973		(Australia) Graham Johnson	300		1 stroke	(Australia) Barry Fry	Lake Karrinyup	
1972		(Australia) Terry Gale (a)	289		4 strokes	(Australia) Ross Metherell	Lake Karrinyup	
1971		(Australia) John Muller (a)	295		2 strokes	(Australia) John Ewing (a) (Australia) Len Thomas	Cottesloe	
1970		(Australia) Barry Jones (a)	284		1 stroke	(Australia) Terry Gale (a)	Royal Perth	
1969		(Australia) Stan Peach	286		4 strokes	(Australia) John Ewing (a)	Lake Karrinyup	
1968		(Australia) Graham Marsh	286		4 strokes	(Australia) John Muller (a)	Western Australian	
1967		(Australia) Len Tidy (a)	295		1 stroke	(Australia) Len Thomas	Mount Lawley	
1966		(Australia) Dennis Bell (a) (3)	279		6 strokes	(Australia) Harold Digney (a) (Australia) Graham Marsh (a)	Cottesloe	
1965		(Australia) Len Thomas (3)	287		5 strokes	(Australia) Dennis Bell (a)	Western Australian	
1964		(Australia) Len Thomas (2)	287		5 strokes	(Australia) Dennis Bell (a)	Royal Perth	
1963		(Australia) Dennis Bell (a) (2)	284		6 strokes	(Australia) Jock Borthwick	Lake Karrinyup	
1962		(Australia) Trevor Osborn	295		Playoff	(Australia) Brian Grey (a)	Cottesloe	
1961		(Australia) Dennis Bell (a)	282		4 strokes	(Australia) Harold Digney (a) (Australia) Justin Seward (a)	Royal Fremantle	
1960		(Australia) Bob Tuohy	291		1 stroke	(South Africa) Brian Henning	Mount Lawley	
1959		(Australia) Len Thomas	290		9 strokes	(Australia) Bill McPherson (a)	Royal Perth	
1958		(Australia) Bill McPherson (a) (2)	292		1 stroke	(Australia) Les Nicholls (Australia) Justin Seward (a)	Western Australian	
1957		(Australia) Bill McPherson (a)	290		5 strokes	(Australia) Bob Stevens (a)	Lake Karrinyup	
1956		(South Africa) Gary Player	289		5 strokes	(Australia) Len Thomas (a)	Mount Lawley	
1955		(Australia) Ted Taylor (a)	300		1 stroke	(Australia) Justin Seward (a)	Royal Fremantle	
1954		(Australia) Eric Cremin (2)	292		3 strokes	(Australia) Brian Crafter	Royal Fremantle	
1953		(Australia) Kelly Rogers (a)	282		10 strokes	(Australia) Brian Crafter	Cottesloe	
1952		(Australia) Kel Nagle (3)	286		6 strokes	(Australia) Larry Harke (a)	Royal Perth	
1951		(Australia) Kel Nagle (2)	286		11 strokes	(Australia) Eric Cremin	Lake Karrinyup	
1950		(Australia) Kel Nagle	283		6 strokes	(Australia) Eric Cremin	Western Australian	
1949		(Australia) Eric Cremin	291		2 strokes	(Australia) Kelly Rogers (a)	Royal Fremantle	
1948		(Australia) Ossie Pickworth	282		4 strokes	(Australia) Eric Cremin	Mount Lawley	
1947		(Australia) Les Nicholls	304		6 strokes	(Australia) Charles Jackson	Cottesloe	
1946		(Australia) Keith Pix (a)	314		1 stroke	(Australia) Bob Hall (a) (Australia) Nev Johnston	Royal Perth	
1940–1945: No tournament due to World War II
1939		(Australia) Fred Thompson	299		3 strokes	(Australia) Harry Godden	Royal Perth	
1938		(Australia) Dan Cullen (2)	298		1 stroke	(Australia) Charlie Snow	Lake Karrinyup	
1937		(Australia) Dan Cullen	295		Playoff	(Australia) Tom Howard	Royal Fremantle	
1936		(Australia) Tom Cassidy (4)	307		Playoff	(Australia) Keith Pix (a)	Western Australian	
1935		(Australia) Harry Godden (2)	296		2 strokes	(Australia) Charlie Snow	Perth	
1934		(Australia) Charlie Snow	300		5 strokes	(Australia) Geoff Hill (a)	Lake Karrinyup	
1933		(Australia) Tom Cassidy (3)	295		1 stroke	(Australia) Charlie Snow	Royal Fremantle	
1932		(Australia) Ernie Bissett	299		4 strokes	(Australia) Tom Cassidy	Perth	
1931		(Australia) Eric Alberts	311		1 stroke	(Australia) Walter Baldwin	Royal Fremantle	
1930		(Australia) Harry Godden (a)	329		2 strokes	(Australia) Reg Forbes (a)	Lake Karrinyup	
1929		(Australia) Tom Cassidy (a) (2)	309		1 stroke	(Australia) J. J. O'Hara (a)	Perth	
1928		(Australia) Tom Cassidy (a)	312		5 strokes	(Australia) Eddie Cassidy (a)	Fremantle	
1927		(Australia) Eddie Cassidy (a) (5)	311		1 stroke	(Australia) Eric Alberts	Fremantle	
1926		(Australia) Eddie Cassidy (a) (4)	310		5 strokes	(Australia) Reg Forbes (a) (Australia) Bill Rees (a)	Fremantle	
1925		(Australia) Eddie Cassidy (a) (3)	315		5 strokes	(Australia) Percy Maunder	Fremantle	
1924		(Australia) Eddie Cassidy (a) (2)	317		5 strokes	(Australia) Reg Forbes (a)	Fremantle	
1923		(Australia) Eddie Cassidy (a)	156		5 strokes	(Australia) Reg Forbes (a) (Australia) Arthur Geere (a)	Fremantle	
1922		(Australia) Percy Maunder	161		1 stroke	(Australia) Arthur Geere (a)	Fremantle	
1921		(Australia) Reg Forbes (a)	160		1 stroke	(Australia) Arthur Geere (a) (Australia) Percy Maunder (Australia) John Walker (a)	Fremantle	
1915–1920: No tournament due to World War I
1914		(Australia) Norman Fowlie (a)	157		3 strokes	(Australia) Clyde Pearce (a)	Fremantle	
1913		(Australia) Clyde Pearce (a)	155		3 strokes	(Australia) Norman Fowlie (a)	Fremantle	
