= Claude Felstead =

Australian amateur golfer

Personal information
- Full name: Claude Fay Felstead
- Nationality: Australia
- Born: 30 October 1889 St Kilda, Victoria, Australia
- Died: 9 March 1964 (aged 74) Nedlands, Western Australia

Career
- Sport: Golf
- Status: Amateur

Claude Fay Felstead (30 October 1889 – 9 March 1964) was an Australian amateur golfer. He won the 1909 Australian Open and was runner-up in the 1911 Australian Amateur.

== Early life ==
Felstead was born on 30 October 1889 in St Kilda, a suburb of Melbourne, the son of William Henry Felstead, a Melbourne businessman. William Felstead was later a partner in the firm of "Beath, Schiess & Felstead".

== Golf career ==
Felstead first competed in the Australian championship meeting in 1905, which was played at Royal Melbourne. Described as "a boy from Greenvale School", he finished third in a handicap event on the first day, scoring a gross 91 off a handicap of 8. He played in the Australian Open later in the week but took 107 in the first round and dropped out.

Felstead finished third in the 1906 Victorian Amateur Championship at Royal Melbourne, behind Walter Carre Riddell and Norman Brookes. The following day he won a 36-hole handicap bogey competition finishing 7 up, off a handicap of 2. In October he travelled to Sydney to play in the championship meeting. He didn't challenge in the open, but was in the top-16 amateurs that contested the amateur championship, losing in the first round to Oscar O'Brien, the current New South Wales Amateur Champion.

Felstead didn't play in any important events in 1907 and 1908. In June 1909 he won the Victoria Golf Club's 54-hole championship by 17 strokes. In August he played in the Victorian Amateur Championship but only finished 9th. The championship meeting was held at Royal Melbourne in September. In the Australian Open Felstead started badly with in 82 but had a 77 in the afternoon, the best round of the day, to be tied for second place behind Dan Soutar. After the third round, Felstead was third, 3 behind Carnegie Clark and two behind Soutar. However, Felstead's afternoon round of 76 was again the best of the day, and with Soutar taking 80 and Clark 85, Felstead won by two strokes. Michael Scott finished fourth, having taken 87 in his first round. The Australian Amateur followed, the first time that Felstead had qualified. He reached the semi-finals, losing 6&4 to Scott. In November, Felstead won the Victoria club's open scratch event.

The Victoria Golf Club's 1910 championship was played as a match-play event, in April. Felstead won the title again, winning the 36-hole final 15&13, having been 13 up after the first round. Felstead played in the New South Wales Amateur Championship at The Australian Golf Club in June. He led the qualifying with Michael Scott second. Felstead and Scott reached the final, Scott winning 4&3. In August Felstead travelled to Adelaide to defend his open title. He was in second place after the opening day, 4 behind Carnegie Clark, but had a bad second day and finished 6th. In the amateur championship he reached the semi-final, losing again to Scott, this time 6&5. Felstead missed the Victorian Amateur Championship through illness.

Felstead played in the 1911 Victorian Amateur Championship, finishing tied for 5th place. In September he played in the championship meeting at Royal Sydney. He finished tied for 12th place in the open, high enough to qualify for the amateur championship. Felstead reached the final but lost 4&3 to Jim Howden.

== Later life ==
in early 1912 Felstead, together with fellow golfer Clyde Pearce, left Victoria to start farming near Pingelly, Western Australia. The move effectively put an end to his golfing career at the highest level, his future golfing activities being largely in Western Australia. They bought the Chybarlis farm, between the townships of Pingelly and Mooterdine, south east of Perth.

Felstead married Ethel Hart in 1915 and soon afterwards joined the Australian Flying Corps. He survived the war, although his partner Clyde Pearce was killed. Felstead resumed farming after the war. His first wife died in 1924 and he remarried. He later sold the farms he owned and retired to Perth, where he died in 1964. He left the clubs that he had used to win the 1909 Australian Open to Pingelly Golf Club.
