= Howden (disambiguation) =

Howden is a town and civil parish in the East Riding of Yorkshire, England.

Howden may also refer to:

== Places ==
- Howden (UK Parliament constituency), a former constituency in Yorkshire, England
- Howden, Tasmania, Australia
- Howden, Manitoba, a settlement in Canada
- Howden, Livingston, an area of Livingston, West Lothian, Scotland
  - Howden House (West Lothian)
- Howden Edge, a peak in the Peak District National Park, England
- Howden Reservoir, England
- Howden-le-Wear, County Durham, England
- RNAS Howden, airship station, England

== People ==
- Baron Howden, an Irish and British Peerage title
- Brett Howden (born 1998), Canadian ice hockey player
- Harry Howden (1876–1922), Australian golfer
- James Howden (1832–1913), Scottish engineer
- James H. Howden (1860–1938), Canadian politician
- James Howden (rugby union) (1900–1978), New Zealand rugby union player
- Jim Howden (golfer) (1878–1921), Australian golfer
- Jim Howden (rower) (1934–1993), Australian rower
- John Power Howden (1879–1959), Canadian MP
- Jordan Howden (born 2000), American football player
- Peter Howden (1911–2003), New Zealand cricketer
- Quinton Howden (born 1992), Canadian ice hockey player
- Robert Howden (1917–2004), South African cricketer
- Roger of Howden (fl. 1174–1201), 12th-century English chronicler
- Ron Howden (skier) (born 1967), British Nordic skier

== Other ==
- Howden, a manufacturer of heavy-duty air and gas handling equipment that merged with Charter Consolidated

== See also ==
- Howdon, Tyne and Wear, England
- Howdenshire, East Riding of Yorkshire, England
