= Clyde Pearce =

Australian amateur golfer

Personal information
- Full name: Clyde Bowman Pearce
- Nationality: Australia
- Born: 24 February 1888 Hobart, Tasmania, Australia
- Died: 10 June 1917 (aged 29) Mesen, Belgium

Career
- Sport: Golf
- Status: Amateur

Best results in major championships
- Masters Tournament: DNP
- PGA Championship: DNP
- U.S. Open: DNP
- The Open Championship: CUT: 1911

Clyde Bowman Pearce (24 February 1888 – 10 June 1917) was an Australian amateur golfer. He won both the Australian Open and the Australian Amateur in 1908 and was runner-up in the Australian Amateur three times. He was killed in Belgium during World War I.

== Early life ==
Pearce was born on 24 February 1888 in Hampden road, Hobart, Tasmania, the son of Edward and Emmeline Pearce, née Bowman. He had an older brother, Roy, and a younger brother, Bruce.

== Golf career ==
As a 15-year-old Pearce played at the 1903 championship meeting at Adelaide. In the Australian Amateur he scored 103 and 95 and was last of those who completed the two qualifying rounds. He also competed in the 1903 Tasmanian Amateur, finishing tied for sixth place, with rounds of 101 and 99. In 1904 he improved to fourth place in the Tasmanian amateur. He played in the inaugural Australian Open at The Australian Golf Club. He finished down the field but was in the top 16 amateurs who qualified for the Australian Amateur. His opponent forfeited in the first round and in the quarter-finals he lost a close match against Jim Howden, the eventual winner, by one hole. In October he played in the Victorian Amateur Championship at Royal Melbourne. He led after a first round 76 but faded, and finished the 72-hole event tied for fifth place.

Pearce came close to winning the 1905 Tasmanian Amateur at Launceston. He led by three strokes after a morning score of 84 and came to the final hole needing 5 to win. However he took 7, for an afternoon score of 90, one behind the winner Howard Giblin who took the title for the third time. The 1905 championship meeting was held at Royal Melbourne. There was no separate match-play competition, the amateur championship being won by the leading amateur in the Open. Pearce's 87 was the best amateur score of the first morning, although he dropped 9 strokes behind Michael Scott after an afternoon 93. However he was then disqualified for incorrectly placing his ball, after getting relief from casual water.

Pearce moved to New South Wales in 1906 and didn't play in the Tasmanian Amateur in September. The 1906 championship meeting was held at Royal Sydney. Pearce didn't challenge for the open but finished high enough to qualify easily for the amateur championship, as one of the leading 16 amateurs. He reached the final, losing, 5 and 4, to Ernest Gill from Queensland, who had finished 11 strokes behind him in the open. In September 1907 Pearce returned to Tasmania to compete in the amateur championship. He had rounds of 75 and 84 to win by 7 strokes, his first big championship success. The 1907 championship meeting was held at Royal Melbourne and, as in 1905, the amateur championship was won by the leading amateur in the Open. An amateur, Michael Scott, won both events, with Pearce finishing fifth in the open and runner-up amongst the amateurs. Tasmania played in the interstate competition for the first time. They met Victoria in the semi-finals, losing all six matches. Pearce lost heavily to Scott in the top match, finishing 9 down over the 18 holes.

The 1908 Australian championship meeting at The Australian Golf Club in Sydney was Pearce's only major meeting of the year. The Australian Open was the first important event, played on Friday 10 and Saturday 11 July. Pearce led by 7 strokes after the first day, with two rounds of 75. New Zealand amateur Arthur Duncan was second, with Dan Soutar the leading professional a further two strokes behind. Pearce took 86 on the final morning and dropped three behind Duncan, who had a 76. In the final round Pearce took 75 to win the championship with a score of 311. Soutar had rounds of 79 and 76 to finish runner-up, three behind Pearce, while Duncan had a final round 86 to drop to third place. Pearce's rounds of 75 were the best of the event until Michael Scott scored 74 in the final round. The leading 8 amateurs in the open qualified for the Australian Amateur, the first two rounds being played on Monday and Tuesday of the following week with the final on the Saturday. All matches were over 36 holes. Pearce had a 10 and 8 win over Leslie Penfold Hyland in the quarter-final, scoring an approximate 73 in his morning round. He met Scott in the semi-final, Scott having beaten Duncan at the 37th hole in the first round. Pearce led Scott by four holes after the morning round and won the match, 6 and 5. On the Thursday, before the final, Pearce played for New South Wales in the interstate competition. Playing Victoria, he played in the top match against Scott and lost by two holes, Victoria winning the match. In the final of the amateur championship Pearce met Neptune Christoe. Pearce was five up after the morning round and won the match, 10 and 8.

Pearce played in the Victorian Amateur Championship in August 1909 at Royal Melbourne. The event was over 72 holes of stroke-play. Pearce was tied with Michael Scott after the first day, and still tied after three rounds. However Scott scored 83 to Pearce's 91 in the final round, to win the championship, Pearce finishing runner-up. The championship meeting was held at Royal Melbourne in September. Pearce played for Tasmania in the interstate competition. Playing in the top match against New South Wales he beat Oscar O'Brien, Tasmania winning by 5 matches to 1. In the final against Victoria he beat Scott. His brother Bruce also won, but Victoria won the remaining four matches to retain the title. In the Australian Open Pearce finished fifth, 17 strokes behind Claude Felstead. He beat his brother in the semi-finals of the Australian Amateur and met Scott in the final. In the final Pearce won the last two holes to level the match but Scott won the 37th hole to take the title.

In July 1910, Pearce and his brother Bruce played in the South Australian Amateur at Royal Adelaide, the venue for the championship meeting the following month. Bruce led the qualifying with Clyde third. Pearce beat his brother in the semi-final and went on to win the championship, beating Bill Gunson, 6 and 4, in the final. In the Australian Open, Pearce finished fifth, behind his brother who finished in third place. He reached the semi-finals of the amateur championship, losing to Jim Howden, 4 and 3, Howden having beaten his brother Bruce in the previous round.

Pearce and his brother Bruce spent most of 1911 on a trip to Britain, leaving Melbourne at the end of February and returning there in mid-November. Their first big event was The Amateur Championship at Prestwick Golf Club. Pearce lost to Bernard Darwin at the last-32 stage. He finished in a tie for 6th place in Golf Illustrated Gold Vase after rounds of 73 and 83 at Stoke Poges. The 1911 Open Championship was held at Royal St George's at the end of June. There was no qualifying and the first two rounds were played over three days. Pearce scored 81 and 84 and missed the cut by three strokes. Pearce won a three-day amateur event at Peterhead Golf Club in July, beating James Shaw in the final. His brother Bruce had won another Aberdeenshire event at Cruden Bay the previous week. They brothers played in the Irish Amateur Open Championship at Portmarnock at the end of August, both losing at the last-16 stage.

In 1913 the stroke-play qualification stage of the Western Australian Amateur was opened up to professionals, becoming the first Western Australian Open Championship. It was played at the Fremantle links on 28 August, nearly 30 players competing. In both 1911 and 1912, Norman Fowlie had led the stroke-play stage but in 1913 he was challenged by Pearce. Pearce won the Open with rounds of 77 and 78, three ahead of Fowlie who had rounds of 83 and 75. Pearce would go on to win the Western Australian Amateur as well. Played two days later, he beat Fowlie, 4 and 2, in the 36-hole final.

The 1914 Western Australian championship meeting was again played on the Fremantle links in late August. Norman Fowlie reversed the result of the 1913 Western Australian Open, winning by three strokes from Pearce, with rounds of 80 and 77. Pearce and Fowlie also contested the final of the Western Australian Amateur, Fowlie winning again by 4 and 3.

== Later life ==
In 1906 Pearce left Tasmania for his brother Roy's sheep farm near Corowa in the south of New South Wales. He became a member of Corowa Golf Club.

in early 1912 Pearce, together with fellow golfer Claude Felstead, started farming near Pingelly, Western Australia. They bought the Chybarlis farm, between the townships of Pingelly and Mooterdine, south east of Perth.

Pearce enlisted in May 1915. He was killed in Belgium on 10 June 1917 during the Battle of Messines. His remains were not recovered and his name is recorded on the Menin Gate memorial nearby.

== Tournament wins ==
- 1907 Tasmanian Amateur
- 1908 Australian Open, Australian Amateur
- 1910 South Australian Amateur
- 1911 Peterhead Amateur Tournament (Scotland)
- 1913 Western Australian Open, Western Australian Amateur

== Team appearances ==
- Australian Men's Interstate Teams Matches (representing Tasmania): 1907, 1909
- Australian Men's Interstate Teams Matches (representing New South Wales): 1908
