= Harry Howden =

Scottish-born Australian amateur golfer (1876–1922)

Personal information
- Full name: Henry Anderson Howden
- Nationality: Scotland; Australia
- Born: 31 May 1876 North Berwick, East Lothian, Scotland
- Died: 21 May 1922 (aged 45) Pennant Hills, New South Wales, Australia

Career
- Sport: Golf
- Status: Amateur

Henry Anderson Howden (31 May 1876 – 21 May 1922) was a Scottish-born Australian amateur golfer. He won the Victorian Golf Cup in 1896, 1897 and 1898 and the Australian Amateur in 1901.

== Early life ==
Howden was born on 31 May 1876, near North Berwick, to tenant farmer Charles Howden. He started playing golf at the age of five. His father died in early 1895 and he emigrated to Australia soon afterwards.

== Golf career ==
By May 1896, Howden was a member of Royal Melbourne Golf Club and played in the inaugural Surrey Hills Gentlemen's Championship. The following week played in a match for the Bankers against the University. In September, Howden won the Victorian Golf Cup, which was only in its third year, but had rapidly established itself as the main tournament in Australia, and was regarded as the amateur championship of Australia. The first two editions had been bogey competitions, but the 1896 contest was decided by match-play with the final over 36 holes. Howden won three matches to reach the final where he met defending champion, Robert Balfour-Melville. Howden was 4 up after the morning round and was still 4 up with 5 to play before Balfour-Melville won four holes in a row to level the match at the 35th hole. Howden won the last hole with a 5 to win by 1 hole.

Howden continued his success in 1897, winning the Royal Melbourne club championship in April, beating Louis Whyte in the final. The match play format used for the 1896 Victorian Golf Cup was not popular and the 1897 event was decided by 72 holes of stroke-play, played on over two days in October. Howden retained the trophy with a score of 348, 33 strokes ahead of William McIntyre. Howden led by 12 after the first day and extended this by a further 21 on the final day.

In May 1898, Howden was runner-up in the Surrey Hills Gentlemen's Championship, two holes behind P. C. Anderson. He won the championship at Essendon Golf Club after a 4-hole playoff against Anderson and Louis Whyte. In October Howden won the Victorian Golf Cup for the third time. He was three behind the leaders after the first day but pulled away on the final day and won with a score of 360, 13 ahead of his brother Jim.

Howden won the Royal Melbourne club championship for the second time in April 1899, beating Robert Balfour-Melville in the final. The Australian Golf Union was formed in 1898 and organised their first championship meeting at Royal Sydney Golf Club, the main event being the amateur championship on 26 and 27 May 1899. Howden and New Zealander Charles Gillies were level after the first day on 157. Howden led by a stroke after three rounds after Gillies had taken 11 at the fourth hole. The pair were still level with nine holes to play but Gillies came home in 37 to Howden's 48 to win with a total of 314, 11 ahead of Howden, who still took second place. The singles event was preceded by the inaugural foursomes championship of Australia, a 36-hole bogey competition. Howden paired up with Louis Whyte and they won the event by 7 holes. Howden played in the 1899 Victorian Golf Cup but had been ill and broke down on the second day.

Howden won the Surrey Hills Gentlemen's Championship in 1900, three holes ahead of Louis Whyte. The amateur championship returned to the Sydney area in 1901, being played at The Australian Golf Club on 11 and 12 July. Howden won with a score of 352, 7 strokes ahead of Hugh MacNeil, although he had trailed by 5 after the first day. In 1902, he again won the championship of the Royal Melbourne club.

== Later life ==
Howden, an official with the London Bank of Australia, transferred from Melbourne to Sydney in 1910. He joined Royal Sydney Golf Club but only played a limited amount of golf. Howden died on 21 May 1922, aged 45, in Pennant Hills. He had been ill with tuberculosis for some time and had moved to Pennant Hills for health reasons. His brother Jim—also a golfer—had also died of tuberculosis five months earlier.
