= James Howden (disambiguation) =

James Howden (1832–1913) was a Scottish engineer

James or Jim Howden may also refer to:

- James H. Howden (1860–1938), Canadian politician
- James Howden (rugby union) (1900–1978), New Zealand rugby union player
- Jim Howden (golfer) (1878–1921), Australian golfer
- Jim Howden (rower) (1934–1993), Australian rower
