= Jim Howden (golfer) =

Australian amateur golfer (1878–1921)

Personal information
- Full name: James Dalrymple Howden
- Nationality: Scotland; Australia
- Born: 1 February 1878 North Berwick, East Lothian, Scotland
- Died: 11 December 1921 (aged 43) Leura, New South Wales, Australia

Career
- Sport: Golf
- Status: Amateur

James Dalrymple Howden (1 February 1878 – 11 December 1921) was an Australian amateur golfer. He won the Australian Amateur in 1904 and 1911 and was runner-up four times. He also won the Victorian Amateur Championship twice and the New South Wales Amateur Championship.

== Early life ==
Howden was born on 1 February 1878 near North Berwick in Scotland, the son of Charles Howden, a tenant farmer. His father died in early 1895 and he later emigrated to Australia. His older brother Harry also emigrated to Australia.

== Golf career ==
Howden is first noted in the Australian newspapers when he played in the 1898 Victorian Golf Cup as a member of Royal Melbourne Golf Club. The championship was decided by stroke-play and was won by his brother, Harry. Jim was runner-up, 13 strokes behind, with a score of 373, a shot ahead of Hugh MacNeil. The Age reported that he "secures the handsome second award, gives every promise of becoming a player of the foremost rank, and he has made an excellent beginning ...". Howden didn't play in the inaugural Australian Amateur in Sydney in 1899 but he played in the 1899 Victorian Golf Cup, which had become the inaugural Victorian Amateur Championship. Howden won with a score of 354, 3 strokes ahead of Frank Stewart. Howden travelled to Adelaide to play in the 1900 Australian Amateur. He finished third, a stroke behind the runner-up Walter Carre Riddell. Later in the year he retained the Victorian Golf Cup and Victorian Amateur Championship, with a score of 361, 7 ahead of Riddell. It was the fifth year in a row that one of the Howden brothers had won the Victorian Golf Cup.

In early 1901 Howden left Melbourne and it was reported that he had won the championship of Nhill golf club in western Victoria. The following year he was a member of Stawell golf team. In 1903 he made a return to playing in the championship meeting. In 1903 the Australian Amateur was played in Adelaide. It was a match-play event with a 36-hole stroke-play qualifying stage with the leading 8 qualifying. Howden tied for 8th place but won a 5-hole playoff to qualify. He then won two matches to reach the final. Playing Dan Soutar he lost 3&1 in the 36-hole final. Later in the year he was runner-up in the Victorian Amateur, although 23 strokes behind the winner, Walter Carre Riddell.

Howden played in the first Australian Open was held in 1904, which acted as qualifying for the amateur championship. He performed badly in the open but was in the leading 16 amateurs that played in the match-play stage of the amateur championship, over three days, with two 18-hole matches on the first day, followed by 36-hole semi-finals and final. Howden beat Michael Scott in the final, a rare defeat for Scott during his spell in Australia. Howden led by one hole after the morning round and increased this to 5 with 9 holes remaining. Despite a comeback from Scott, Howden won 3&2. The 1905 championship meeting was played at Royal Melbourne and the open and amateur championship were decided by the same 72-hole tournament. Dan Soutar, now a professional, won the open with Michael Scott second, 10 strokes behind. As the leading amateur, Scott won the amateur championship. Howden finished fifth but was the second amateur, 6 behind Scott.

In early 1906 Howden was seriously injured falling off a horse, breaking a leg. Although he returned to playing later in 1906 he didn't make a return to the important events until the 1908 championship meeting. In the Australian Open he dropped out after the first day and so failed to qualify for the amateur championship. In 1909 at Royal Melbourne he finished tied for 8th in the open but was drawn against Michael Scott in the first round of the amateur, losing 4&3. In 1910 at Adelaide he was again tied for 8th in the Open and reached the final of the Australian Amateur, losing again to Scott 10&8. In 1911 at Royal Sydney he finished tied for 6th in the open and then went on the win the amateur championship, beating Claude Felstead 4&3 in the final. At the 1912 championship meeting Howden finished 4th in the Open, the second amateur, and lost in the semi-final of the amateur championship to Gordon Burnham.

In 1914 Howden won the New South Wales Amateur Championship. He had been tied for 6th after the qualifying stage but in the first round he beat Henry McClelland, who had led the qualifying. He then beat the defending champion Walter Sturrock in the semi-final and Tom Howard in the final, by one hole. Howden also won the NSW Country championship, for golfers from outside Sydney, finishing 11 strokes clear in the 36-hole event.

== Later life ==
Howden lived in the Stawell area for about 10 years where he was an accountant on the Kirkella estate. In late 1912 he moved to New South Wales, becoming the secretary at The Australian Golf Club in Sydney. Howden was in poor health with tuberculosis and in the middle of 1913 he took up a similar position at Leura Golf Club in the Blue Mountains. Howden tried to join the army at the start of World War I but was refused. He was, however, accepted in early 1916. He spent some time in France but was invalided home. He died at Leura, New South Wales on 11 December 1921, aged 43.
