= Daniel Popovic =

Daniel Popovic may refer to:

- Daniel (Montenegrin singer) (born 1955), Montenegro-born Croatian singer
- Daniel Popovic (golfer) (born 1986), Australian golfer
