= Gordon Barry =

English golfer

Personal information
- Full name: Arthur Gordon Barry
- Nationality: England
- Born: 6 September 1885 Torpoint, Cornwall, England
- Died: 21 August 1942 (aged 56) Edinburgh, Scotland

Career
- Sport: Golf
- Status: Amateur

Best results in major championships (wins: 1)
- Masters Tournament: DNP
- PGA Championship: DNP
- U.S. Open: DNP
- The Open Championship: CUT: 1905
- British Amateur: Won: 1905

Arthur Gordon Barry CBE DSO MC (6 September 1885 – 21 August 1942) was a professional soldier and an English amateur golfer. He won the Amateur Championship in 1905.

== Golf career ==
Barry was just 19 years old when he won the Amateur Championship in 1905, beating Osmund Scott, 3 and 2, in the final. At the time this made him the youngest player to win the title. He was studying at the University of St Andrews. He then studied at Cambridge University, playing against Oxford in 1906 and 1907. In 1914 he studied at Oxford and played for Oxford against Cambridge. He represented England against Scotland in the annual amateur international in 1906 and 1907. He was the army champion in 1922 and 1925.

== Military career ==
An officer of the Royal Tank Regiment, Barry was, from 1935 to 1938, an instructor at the Staff College, Camberley. He was then specially employed from September−December 1938, and again from January−April 1939 before briefly becoming an Assistant Adjutant and Quartermaster-General (AA&QMG) and then a temporary AA&QMG. By October 1941 he was serving in Scottish Command as a Deputy Adjutant and Quartermaster-General. He died suddenly on 21 August 1942.

== Amateur wins ==
- 1905 Amateur Championship
- 1922 Army Championship
- 1925 Army Championship

== Major championships ==
=== Wins (1) ===
Year	Championship	Winning score	Runner-up
1905	Amateur Championship	3 & 2	(England) Osmund Scott

== Team appearances ==
- England–Scotland Amateur Match (representing England): 1906, 1907
