= Ben Jackson (golfer) =

English professional golfer (born 1967)

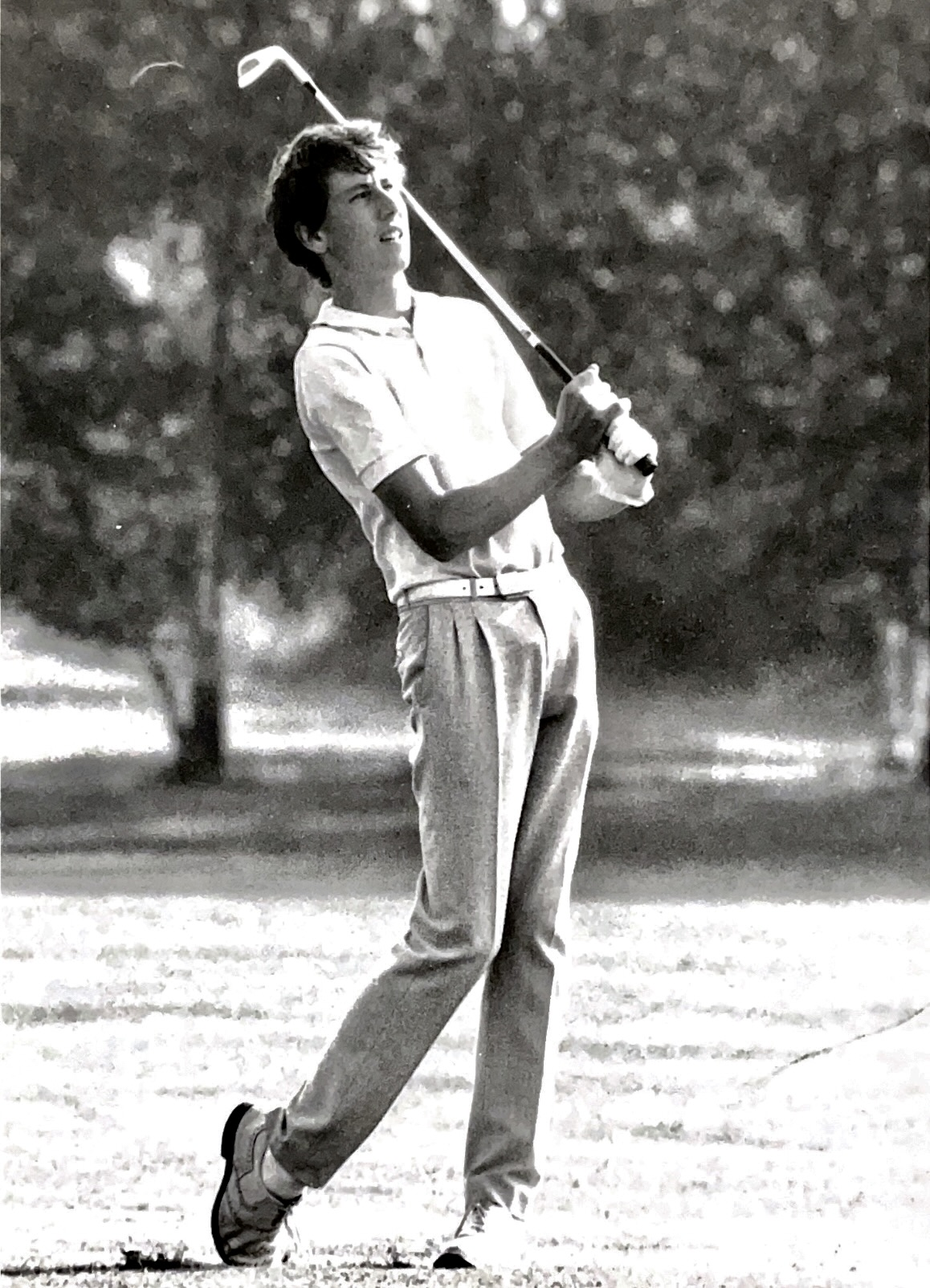

Personal information
- Full name: Benedict Jackson
- Nationality: England
- Born: 23 May 1967 (age 59) Helperby, North Yorkshire, England
- Height: 1.82 m (5 ft 11 1/2 in)

Career
- Sport: Golf
- Turned professional: 1989
- Current tour: PGA Legends Tour
- Former tour: PGA Tour of Australasia
- Professional wins: 10

Benedict Jackson (born 23 May 1967) is an English-born professional golfer who has lived in Australia for his adult life. During the course of his career he has won several major golf tournaments, most notably the 1995 Western Australian Open.

== Early life and amateur career ==
Jackson was born on 23 May 1967 in the village of Helperby, North Yorkshire. He was educated at the private school King's Ely in Ely, Cambridgeshire.

As a young amateur, Jackson represented the England Boys team in 1984.

== Professional career ==
In 1987, at the age of 19, Jackson immigrated to Australia. He went on to win numerous pro-am events throughout the late 1980s and 1990s. Jackson played in the 1995 Western Australia PGA Championship at Joondalup, finishing second by one stroke. Weeks later, Jackson won the 1995 Western Australian Open in a sudden-death playoff, becoming the first European-born champion in the tournament's history. He temporarily retired from professional play in 1999.

In 2018, Jackson gained a place on the Australian PGA Legends Tour through qualifying school. He won five official events during his first two years on the tour. In addition, he won three times in 2021 and once more in 2022.

== Professional wins (10) ==
=== Australasian Foundation Tour wins (1) ===
No.	Date	Tournament	Winning score	Margin of victory	Runner-up
1	21 May 1995	Western Australian Open	70-64-68-68=270	Playoff	(New Zealand) Grant Moorhead

=== PGA of Australia Legends Tour (9) ===
- 2018 (1) Live Life Group Maleny Legends Pro-Am
- 2019 (4) Club Mandalay Legends Pro-Am (tied with Peter Fowler), Bribie Island Legends Pro-Am, Furphy Murrumbidgee Legends Pro-Am (tied with Douglas Maiden and Simon Tooman), Minder Secure Cloud Services Legends Pro-Am for Maitland Palliative Care (tied with Steven Aisbett)
- 2021 (3) Pacific Harbour Legends Pro-Am, Reside Communities Pacific Legends Pro-Am, Fidelity Capital Group Charity Legends Pro-Am
- 2022 (1) Mike Carney Toyota Townsville Legends Pro-Am
