= Brady Watt =

Australian professional golfer

Personal information
- Nationality: Australia
- Born: 9 May 1990 (age 36) Perth, Australia
- Height: 6 ft 1 in (1.85 m)
- Weight: 180 lb (82 kg; 13 st)

Career
- Sport: Golf
- Turned professional: 2013
- Current tour: PGA Tour of Australasia
- Professional wins: 1

Best results in major championships
- Masters Tournament: DNP
- PGA Championship: DNP
- U.S. Open: CUT: 2014
- The Open Championship: DNP

Brady Watt (born 9 May 1990) is an Australian professional golfer from Perth, Western Australia. He was the number one ranked golfer in the World Amateur Golf Ranking for one week in June 2013.

Watt was the medalist in the 2013 Australian Amateur held at Woodlands, Victoria. He was also on the winning Ten Nations Cup team earlier that year.

Watt won his first professional event in 2021 at the inaugural Sandbelt Invitational played in Melbourne, Australia.

== Amateur wins ==
- 2011 Lake Macquarie Amateur
- 2012 Riversdale Cup
- 2013 Australian Amateur Stroke Play

== Professional wins (1) ==
=== Other wins (1) ===
No.	Date	Tournament	Winning score	Margin of victory	Runner-up
1	23 Dec 2021	Sandbelt Invitational	−10 (67-70-66-70=273)	6 strokes	(Australia) Jediah Morgan

== Playoff record ==
PGA Tour of Australasia playoff record (0–1)

No.	Year	Tournament	Opponent	Result
1	2012	John Hughes Geely/Nexus Risk Services WA Open (as an amateur)	(Australia) Oliver Goss (a)	Lost to birdie on fifth extra hole

== Results in major championships ==
Tournament	2014
U.S. Open	CUT

CUT = missed the halfway cut
Note: Watt only played in the U.S. Open.
