= Rohan Blizard =

Australian professional golfer

Personal information
- Nationality: Australia
- Born: 20 May 1984 (age 42)

Career
- Sport: Golf
- Turned professional: 2008
- Current tour: PGA Tour of Australasia
- Former tour: Asian Tour
- Professional wins: 3

Number of wins by tour
- PGA Tour of Australasia: 1
- Other: 2

Best results in major championships
- Masters Tournament: DNP
- PGA Championship: DNP
- U.S. Open: DNP
- The Open Championship: CUT: 2008

Rohan Blizard (born 20 May 1984) is an Australian professional golfer, who currently plays on the Asian Tour.

== Early life and amateur career ==
Blizard was born in New South Wales and plays golf at New South Wales Golf Club. The highlight of his amateur career came in March 2007 when he claimed the Australian Amateur at his home course. He used local knowledge to his advantage, progressing to the final where he defeated fellow New South Welshman Justin Roach 3 & 2. Blizard was also a member of the Golf Australia National Squad.

== Professional career ==
In 2008, Blizard turned pro. His career highlight came in 2011 when he claimed the John Hughes Geely Nexus Risk Services Western Australia Open Championship, shooting a 5-under-par 67 in the final round for a 10-under-par total. This was a two stroke victory over Ashley Hall, David McKenzie and Matt Jager.

== Amateur wins ==
- 2007 Australian Amateur, SBS Invitational
- 2008 New South Wales Medal, East of Scotland Open Amateur

== Professional wins (3) ==
=== PGA Tour of Australasia wins (1) ===
| No. | Date | Tournament | Winning score | Margin of victory | Runners-up |
|---|---|---|---|---|---|
| 1 | 30 Oct 2011 | WA Open Championship | −10 (67-70-74-67=278) | 2 strokes | (Australia) Ashley Hall, (Australia) Matt Jager, (Australia) David McKenzie |

PGA Tour of Australasia playoff record (0–1)

| No. | Year | Tournament | Opponent | Result |
|---|---|---|---|---|
| 1 | 2015 | Isuzu Queensland Open | (Australia) David Bransdon | Lost to birdie on third extra hole |

=== PGA Tour China wins (1) ===
| No. | Date | Tournament | Winning score | Margin of victory | Runners-up |
|---|---|---|---|---|---|
| 1 | 12 Jun 2016 | Lanhai Open | −10 (70-67-69=206) | 1 stroke | (China) Dou Zecheng, (United States) Jarin Todd |

=== Other wins (1) ===
- 2007 Tasmanian Open (as an amateur)

== Results in major championships ==
| Tournament | 2008 |
|---|---|
| The Open Championship | CUT |

Note: Blizard only played in The Open Championship.
CUT = missed the half-way cut

== Team appearances ==
Amateur

- Nomura Cup (representing Australia): 2007 (winners)
- Eisenhower Trophy (representing Australia): 2008
- Bonallack Trophy (representing Asia/Pacific): 2008
- Australian Men's Interstate Teams Matches (representing New South Wales): 2005 (winners), 2006 (winners), 2007 (winners), 2008
