= Louis Whyte =

Australian amateur sportsman

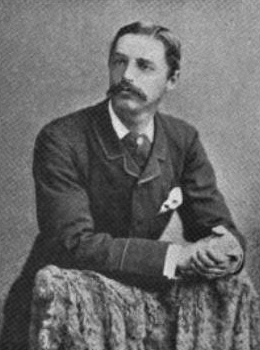

Personal information
- Full name: Louis Australia Whyte
- Nationality: Australia
- Born: 1852 Hobart, Van Diemen's Land
- Died: 3 April 1911 (aged 59) Geelong, Victoria, Australia

Career
- Sport: Golf
- Status: Amateur

Louis Australia Whyte (1852 – 3 April 1911) was an Australian amateur tennis player and golfer. He won the Intercolonial Lawn Tennis Championships twice, in 1881 and 1883. In golf he won the Victorian Golf Cup in 1894 and the Australian Amateur in 1900.

== Early life ==
Louis Whyte was born in Hobart in 1852, the son of Charles James Whyte. He first married Margaret Skene, the daughter of late Hon. William Skene on 30 April 1879. However Margaret died in London less than three months later, aged 26. He was married again in 1889, in London, to Minna Burnett. Minna, a widow, was the daughter of Charles Ibbotson. Louis and Minna had a son, Louis Melville Whyte who was born in London in 1890.

== Tennis career ==
White won the "Intercolonial Lawn Tennis Championships", twice, in 1881 and 1883. The 1881 championship was played on grass at the Melbourne Cricket Ground. Frank Highett, the defending champion, reached the final again but lost to Whyte. The 1882 championship was played on the asphalt courts. Whyte reached the final and met Arthur Keyser, a member of HMS Nelson. Whyte won the first set, but Keyser took the next three to win the championship. Whyte reached his third successive final in 1883 where he beat Walter Carre Riddell in three straight sets. 1885 saw a repeat of the 1883 final between Riddell and Whyte. A different scoring system was in use that year. There were no sets, the winner being the first to reach 25 games. Riddell took a 12 games to 1 lead and eventually won by 25 games to 13.

Whyte represented Victoria in their intercolonial matches against New South Wales, which started in 1885. He played in the inaugural match in Sydney in 1885 and in both matches in 1886.

== Golf career ==
In 1894 the Melbourne Golf Club founded the "Victorian Golf Cup" open to all amateurs in Australasia. It was played on 5, 7 and 9 November with the result decided by a bogey competition over three rounds. Whyte won with a score of 6 holes down on bogey, 6 holes ahead of Mark Anderson. The Victorian Golf Cup rapidly established itself as the main golf tournament in Australia, and was regarded as the amateur championship of Australia. From 1899, the Australian Golf Union ran their own Australian Amateur. The 1899 championship was preceded by the inaugural foursomes championship of Australia, a 36-hole bogey competition. Whyte paired up with Harry Howden and they won the event by 7 holes. In 1900 it was held at Adelaide Golf Club on 28 and 29 June. Whyte won with a score of 382, four ahead of Walter Carre Riddell. None of the leading players from New South Wales played. In 1903 Whyte won the Surrey Hills Gentlemen's Championship, beating William McIntyre by one hole in an 18-hole playoff. They had both finished two down in the 36-hole bogey competition.

== Later life ==
On 3 April 1911, Whyte killed himself with a pistol, at his house, "The Heights", in Geelong. He had been suffering from insomnia and neurasthenia and was depressed. He left an estate valued at £38,700. "The Heights" was prefabricated in Germany and assembled in 1855 for Charles Ibbotson, Minna's father. Minna inherited the house and it later passed to Louis Melville Whyte. Louis junior married but had no children and, after his death in 1975, the house was left to the National Trust of Australia.
