= Curtis Luck =

Australian professional golfer (born 1996)

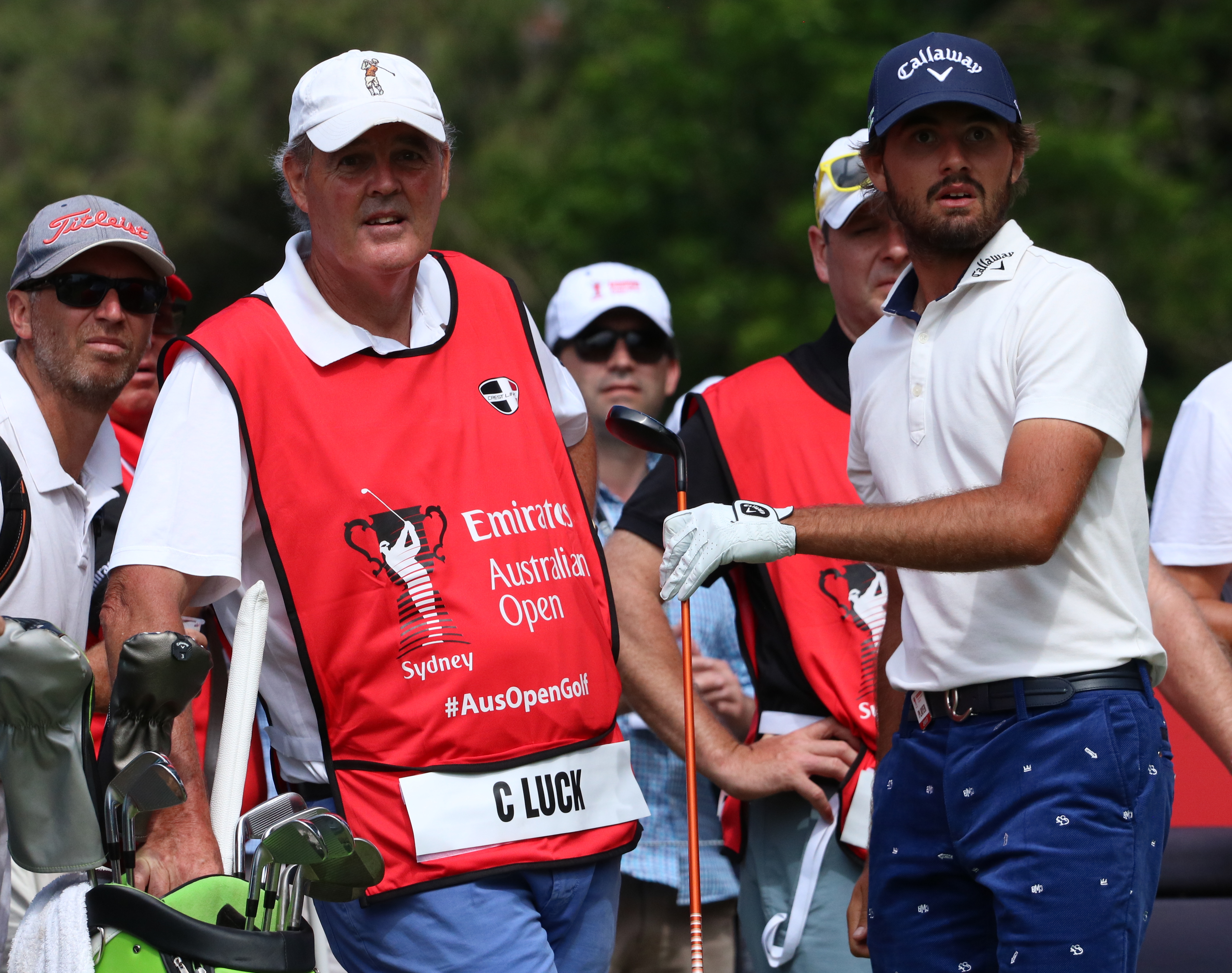
- Luck at the 2017 Emirates Australian Open

Personal information
- Full name: Curtis John Luck
- Nationality: Australia
- Born: 9 August 1996 (age 30) Perth, Western Australia

Career
- Sport: Golf
- Turned professional: 2017
- Current tours: Korn Ferry Tour; PGA Tour of Australasia
- Former tour: PGA Tour
- Professional wins: 2

Number of wins by tour
- PGA Tour of Australasia: 1
- Korn Ferry Tour: 1

Best results in major championships
- Masters Tournament: T46: 2017
- PGA Championship: DNP
- U.S. Open: CUT: 2020
- The Open Championship: CUT: 2025

Curtis John Luck (born 9 August 1996) is an Australian professional golfer from Cottesloe, Western Australia. In March 2017 he became the number one ranked amateur golfer in the world, heading the World Amateur Golf Ranking. He held that ranking before turning professional in April.

== Golf career ==
Luck was runner-up at the 2014 Australian Amateur. He also won the 2016 Western Australian Open on the PGA Tour of Australasia.

Luck won the 2016 U.S. Amateur. He had previously planned to turn professional in October 2016, but decided to wait in order to retain his invitations in the 2017 Masters, U.S. Open and Open Championship. He moved from seventh in the World Amateur Golf Ranking to third with the win.

Luck was awarded the Emerging Athlete of the Year at the 2016 Australian Institute of Sport Performance Awards.

Luck later decided to turn professional at the 2017 Valero Texas Open, meaning he forfeited his U.S. Open and Open Championship exemptions.

In August 2020, Luck won the Nationwide Children's Hospital Championship in Ohio on the Korn Ferry Tour.

== Amateur wins ==
- 2012 Newman and Brooks Junior Championship
- 2014 Victorian Junior Masters, New South Wales Medal, Western Australian Amateur
- 2016 U.S. Amateur, Asia-Pacific Amateur Championship

== Professional wins (2) ==
=== PGA Tour of Australasia wins (1) ===
No.	Date	Tournament	Winning score	Margin of victory	Runner-up
1	1 May 2016	Nexus Risk TSA Group WA Open (as an amateur)	−19 (67-64-62-68=261)	2 strokes	(Australia) Travis Smyth (a)

=== Korn Ferry Tour wins (1) ===
Legend
Championship Series (1)
Other Korn Ferry Tour (0)

No.	Date	Tournament	Winning score	Margin of victory	Runners-up
1	23 Aug 2020	Nationwide Children's Hospital Championship	−11 (68-66-68-71=273)	1 stroke	(United States) Theo Humphrey, (United States) Taylor Montgomery, (United States) Cameron Young

== Results in major championships ==
Results not in chronological order in 2020.

Tournament	2017	2018
Masters Tournament	T46	
U.S. Open		
The Open Championship		
PGA Championship		

Tournament	2019	2020	2021	2022	2023	2024	2025
Masters Tournament							
PGA Championship							
U.S. Open		CUT					
The Open Championship		NT					CUT

Did not play

CUT = missed the half-way cut
"T" = tied for place
NT = no tournament due to COVID-19 pandemic

== Team appearances ==
Amateur

- Eisenhower Trophy (representing Australia): 2016 (winners)

== See also ==
- 2018 Web.com Tour Finals graduates
