= Scott Arnold (golfer) =

Australian professional golfer (born 1985)

Personal information
- Nationality: Australia
- Born: 13 September 1985 (age 41)
- Height: 6 ft 0 in (1.83 m)
- Weight: 143 lb (65 kg; 10.2 st)

Career
- Sport: Golf
- Turned professional: 2009
- Former tours: European Tour; Challenge Tour; PGA Tour of Australasia; OneAsia Tour
- Professional wins: 2

Number of wins by tour
- PGA Tour of Australasia: 1
- Challenge Tour: 1

Best results in major championships
- Masters Tournament: DNP
- PGA Championship: DNP
- U.S. Open: DNP
- The Open Championship: T40: 2015

Scott Arnold (born 13 September 1985) is an Australian professional golfer.

== Amateur career ==
Arnold was a top amateur golfer, winning several events in Australia. He was the number one ranked golfer in the World Amateur Golf Ranking for five weeks in early 2009.

== Professional career ==
In 2009, Arnold turned professional. He has played on the European Tour, Challenge Tour, OneAsia Tour, and the PGA Tour of Australasia. He won his first professional tournament in January 2012 at the Victorian Open.

== Amateur wins ==
this list may be incomplete

- 2006 Hong Kong Amateur
- 2008 Riversdale Cup
- 2009 Australian Amateur, Lake Macquarie Amateur

== Professional wins (2) ==
=== PGA Tour of Australasia wins (1) ===
No.	Date	Tournament	Winning score	Margin of victory	Runner-up
1	8 Jan 2012	Victorian Open	−12 (71-66-67-68=272)	1 stroke	(Australia) Kurt Barnes

PGA Tour of Australasia playoff record (0–1)

No.	Year	Tournament	Opponent	Result
1	2020	Coca-Cola Queensland PGA Championship	(Australia) Michael Sim	Lost to par on fourth extra hole

=== Challenge Tour wins (1) ===
No.	Date	Tournament	Winning score	Margin of victory	Runners-up
1	6 Sep 2015	Cordon Golf Open	−9 (71-65-67-68=271)	2 strokes	(Netherlands) Daan Huizing, (England) James Robinson

== Results in major championships ==
Tournament	2015
Masters Tournament	
U.S. Open	
The Open Championship	T40
PGA Championship	

Did not play

CUT = missed the half-way cut
"T" = tied

== Team appearances ==
Amateur

- Sloan Morpeth Trophy (representing Australia): 2008 (winners)
- Australian Men's Interstate Teams Matches (representing New South Wales): 2007 (winners), 2008

== See also ==
- 2012 European Tour Qualifying School graduates
