= Matt Stieger =

Australian professional golfer

Personal information
- Full name: Matthew Stieger
- Nationality: Australia
- Born: 14 February 1991 (age 35)

Career
- Sport: Golf
- Turned professional: 2012
- Current tours: PGA Tour of Australasia; Asian Tour
- Professional wins: 2

Number of wins by tour
- PGA Tour of Australasia: 1
- Other: 1

Matthew Stieger (born 14 February 1991) is an Australian professional golfer.

== Career ==
Stieger won the Australian Amateur in 2011. He also won the Tasmanian Open in 2011.

Stieger turned professional in late 2012 and won the 2012 New South Wales PGA Championship on the PGA Tour of Australasia.

== Amateur wins ==
- 2009 Handa Junior Masters
- 2011 Australian Amateur

== Professional wins (2) ==
=== PGA Tour of Australasia wins (1) ===
No.	Date	Tournament	Winning score	Margin of victory	Runner-up
1	2 Dec 2012	NSW PGA Championship	−15 (67-67-71-68=273)	3 strokes	(Australia) Daniel Nisbet

PGA Tour of Australasia playoff record (0–1)

No.	Year	Tournament	Opponent	Result
1	2014	Oates Victorian Open Championship	(Australia) Matthew Griffin	Lost to birdie on third extra hole

=== Other wins (1) ===
- 2011 Tasmanian Open (as an amateur)

== Team appearances ==
Amateur

- Eisenhower Trophy (representing Australia): 2012
- Australian Men's Interstate Teams Matches (representing New South Wales): 2010, 2011
