= Oliver Goss =

Australian professional golfer

Personal information
- Nationality: Australia
- Born: 12 April 1994 (age 32) Frimley, Surrey, England

Career
- Sport: Golf
- College: Tennessee
- Turned professional: 2014
- Current tour: Web.com Tour
- Professional wins: 1

Number of wins by tour
- PGA Tour of Australasia: 1

Best results in major championships
- Masters Tournament: 49th: 2014
- PGA Championship: DNP
- U.S. Open: CUT: 2014
- The Open Championship: DNP

Oliver Goss (born 12 April 1994) is an Australian professional golfer. He is from Fremantle, Western Australia.

Goss won the 2012 Western Australian Open on the PGA Tour of Australasia while still an amateur.

Goss was runner-up in the 2013 U.S. Amateur. He was the only amateur golfer to make the cut at the 2014 Masters Tournament and thus received low amateur honors.

Goss turned professional after the 2014 U.S. Open and made his professional debut at the next week's Travelers Championship.

== Amateur wins ==
- 2011 Handa Australia Cup
- 2012 WA Amateur

== Professional wins (1) ==
=== PGA Tour of Australasia wins (1) ===
No.	Date	Tournament	Winning score	Margin of victory	Runner-up
1	28 Oct 2012	John Hughes Geely/Nexus Risk Services WA Open (as an amateur)	−16 (72-66-68-66=272)	Playoff	(Australia) Brady Watt (a)

PGA Tour of Australasia playoff record (1–0)

No.	Year	Tournament	Opponent	Result
1	2012	John Hughes Geely/Nexus Risk Services WA Open (as an amateur)	(Australia) Brady Watt (a)	Won with birdie on fifth extra hole
