= Jack Hayward (cricketer) =

Rhodesian cricketer (1910–1976)

Personal information
- Full name: Cecil John Rhodes Hayward
- Born: 23 August 1910; Bulawayo, Rhodesia
- Died: 6 November 1976 (aged 66); Durban, South Africa
- Source: Cricinfo, 6 December 2020

Jack Hayward (23 August 1910 – 6 November 1976) was a Rhodesian cricketer. He played in eighteen first-class matches from 1927/28 to 1938/39.
