= Lake Karrinyup Bowl =

Golf tournament

Tournament information
- Location: Karrinyup, Western Australia
- Established: 1963
- Course(s): Lake Karrinyup Country Club
- Final year: 1964

Final champion
- Cobie Legrange

The Lake Karrinyup Bowl was a golf tournament held in Australia in 1963 and 1964. The events were held at Lake Karrinyup Country Club, Karrinyup, Western Australia. Total prize money was A£3,000.

== Winners ==
Year	Winner	Country	Score	Margin of victory	Runner-up	Winner's share (A£)	Ref
1963	Kel Nagle	Australia	280	3 strokes	(Japan) Hideyo Sugimoto	1,000	
1964	Cobie Legrange	South Africa	279	1 stroke	(Australia) Kel Nagle		
