= Legh Winser =

Anglo–Australian cricketer, golfer, colonial secretary and orchardist

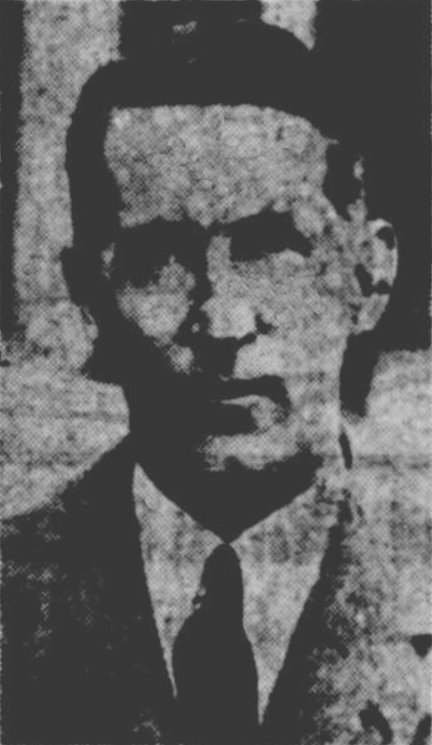

Personal information
- Full name: Cyril Legh Winser
- Born: 27 November 1884; High Legh, Cheshire, England
- Died: 20 December 1983 (aged 99); Barwon Heads, Victoria, Australia
- Batting: Right-handed
- Role: Wicket-keeper

Domestic team information
- Years: Team
- 1913/14–1920/21: South Australia
- 1906–1909: Staffordshire

Career statistics
Competition	First-class
Matches	5
Runs scored	64
Batting average	8.00
100s/50s	–/–
Top score	23
Catches/stumpings	8/6
- Source: Cricinfo, 22 March 2015

Cyril Legh Winser MVO CMG (27 November 1884 — 20 December 1983) was an Anglo–Australian cricketer, golfer, colonial secretary and orchardist. Born in England, Winser briefly played minor counties cricket for Staffordshire, before emigrating to Australia, where he played Sheffield Shield cricket for South Australia. He also excelled as an amateur golfer, winning several tournaments in Australia, and was the secretary to the Governor of South Australia.

== Early life in England ==
Born at High Legh, Cheshire, Winser was educated at Oundle School. He made his debut in minor counties cricket for Staffordshire against the Lancashire Second XI in the 1906 Minor Counties Championship, playing a total of 21 Minor Counties Championship matches from 1906 to 1909. He was a part of the Staffordshire team which won the Minor Counties Championship in 1908. In his capacity as wicket-keeper, Winser would have kept wicket to one of the best bowlers in the world at the time, Sydney Barnes, who played much of his domestic career at minor counties level.

== Move to Australia ==
Winser emigrated to Australia in 1909, becoming an orchardist at Blackwood, South Australia. He soon began playing cricket for South Australia, making his debut in first-class cricket in the 1913/14 Sheffield Shield against New South Wales. He played in three Shield matches that season and was a strong candidate to be a part of the Australia team to tour South Africa, which was cancelled due to the onset of World War I. He became the Private Secretary to Sir Henry Galway, the Governor of South Australia, in 1915. He would serve in his capacity as Private Secretary to a succession of governors.

He made his final appearances in first-class cricket in 1920, playing two matches for South Australia in the 1920–21 Sheffield Shield. He was the Australian Amateur golf champion in 1921. By the time of the infamous bodyline tour of 1932-33, Wisner was serving as the Private Secretary to Alexander Hore-Ruthven, who was in England at the time. Following the third Test match at Adelaide and the controversy that arose from it, Winser arranged for an urgent cable to be sent to Hore-Ruthven in England, urging him to make contact with the Dominions Office in order to avoid a full-scale diplomatic incident. He later retired to Barwon Heads, Victoria, where he died on 20 December 1983. At the time of his death he was the oldest living Sheffield Shield cricketer.
