= Daniel Popovic (golfer) =

Australian professional golfer

Personal information
- Nationality: Australia
- Born: 1 March 1986 (age 40)
- Height: 6 ft 2 in (1.88 m)

Career
- Sport: Golf
- Turned professional: 2010
- Current tour: PGA Tour of Australasia
- Professional wins: 1

Number of wins by tour
- PGA Tour of Australasia: 1

Daniel Popovic (born 1 March 1986) is an Australian professional golfer.

== Career ==
Popovic began playing on the PGA Tour of Australasia in 2012 and won the final event of the season, the Australian PGA Championship.

== Professional wins (1) ==
=== PGA Tour of Australasia wins (1) ===
No.	Date	Tournament	Winning score	Margin of victory	Runners-up
1	16 Dec 2012	Australian PGA Championship^{1}	−16 (64-70-69-69=272)	4 strokes	(Australia) Anthony Brown, (Australia) Rod Pampling

^{1}Co-sanctioned by the OneAsia Tour

== Results in World Golf Championships ==
Tournament	2013
Match Play	
Championship	
Invitational	73
Champions	T66

Did not play

"T" = Tied
