= Jamie McCallum =

American sociologist and author

Jamie K. McCallum is an American sociologist. He is associate professor of sociology at Middlebury College. McCallum won the 2014 Labor and Labor Movements Distinguished Scholarly Book Award of the American Sociological Association for Global Unions, Local Power.

== Books ==
- Essential: How the Pandemic Transformed the Long Struggle for Worker Justice (Basic Books, 2022)
- Worked Over: How Round-The-Clock-Work Is Killing the American Dream (Basic Books, 2020)
- Global Unions, Local Power: The New Spirit of Transnational Labor Organizing (Cornell, 2013)
