= Osmund Scott =

English cricketer and golfer

Personal information
- Born: 24 March 1876; Wareham, Dorset
- Died: 9 September 1948 (aged 72); Marylebone, London
- Batting: Right-handed

Domestic team information
- Years: Team
- 1905: Gloucestershire
- Source: Cricinfo, 30 March 2014

The Hon. Osmund Scott (24 March 1876 – 9 September 1948) was an English cricketer.

== Early life ==
In 1876, Scott was born in Wareham, Dorset. He was the son of John Scott, 3rd Earl of Eldon, and the fifth of seven children. He attended Winchester College. Among his siblings were Lady Margaret Scott, an early women's golf champion, and Michael Scott, who won The Amateur Championship in 1933.

== Career ==
In 1905, Scott played cricket for Gloucestershire. Scott was also a golfer; he was runner-up at the 1905 Amateur Championship.

Scott served in World War I between 1916 and 1918 with the Royal Army Service Corps.

== Personal life ==
Scott married Mary Cecilia Stuart. They had seven children.

== Results in major championships ==
This timeline may be incomplete.

Tournament	1898	1899	1900	1901	1902	1903	1904	1905	1906	1907	1908	1909	1910	1911	1912
The Open Championship								CUT							
The Amateur Championship	R128			R128	R64	R128		2	R128	R128	R128		R128	R256	R128

Top 10
Did not play

R256, R128, R64, R32, R16, QF, SF = round in which player lost in match play

== Team appearances ==
- England–Scotland Amateur Match (representing England): 1902, 1905, 1906
