= Peterhead Golf Club =

Golf club in Peterhead, Aberdeenshire, Scotland

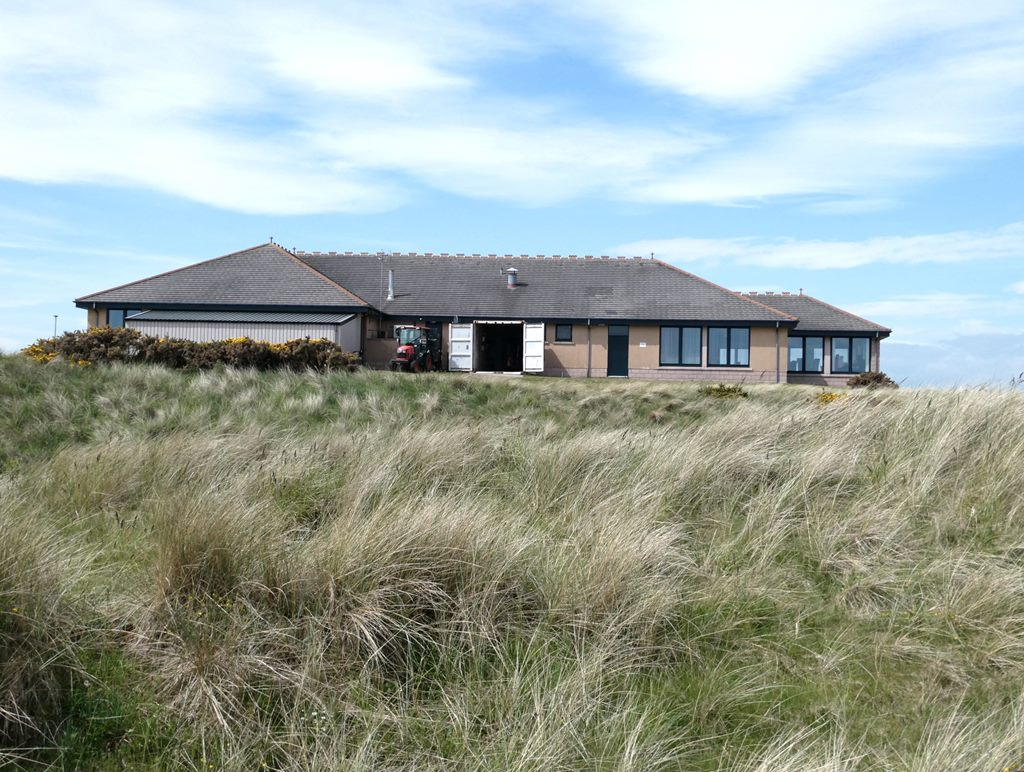
- The eastern façade of Peterhead Golf Club's clubhouse, pictured in 2021

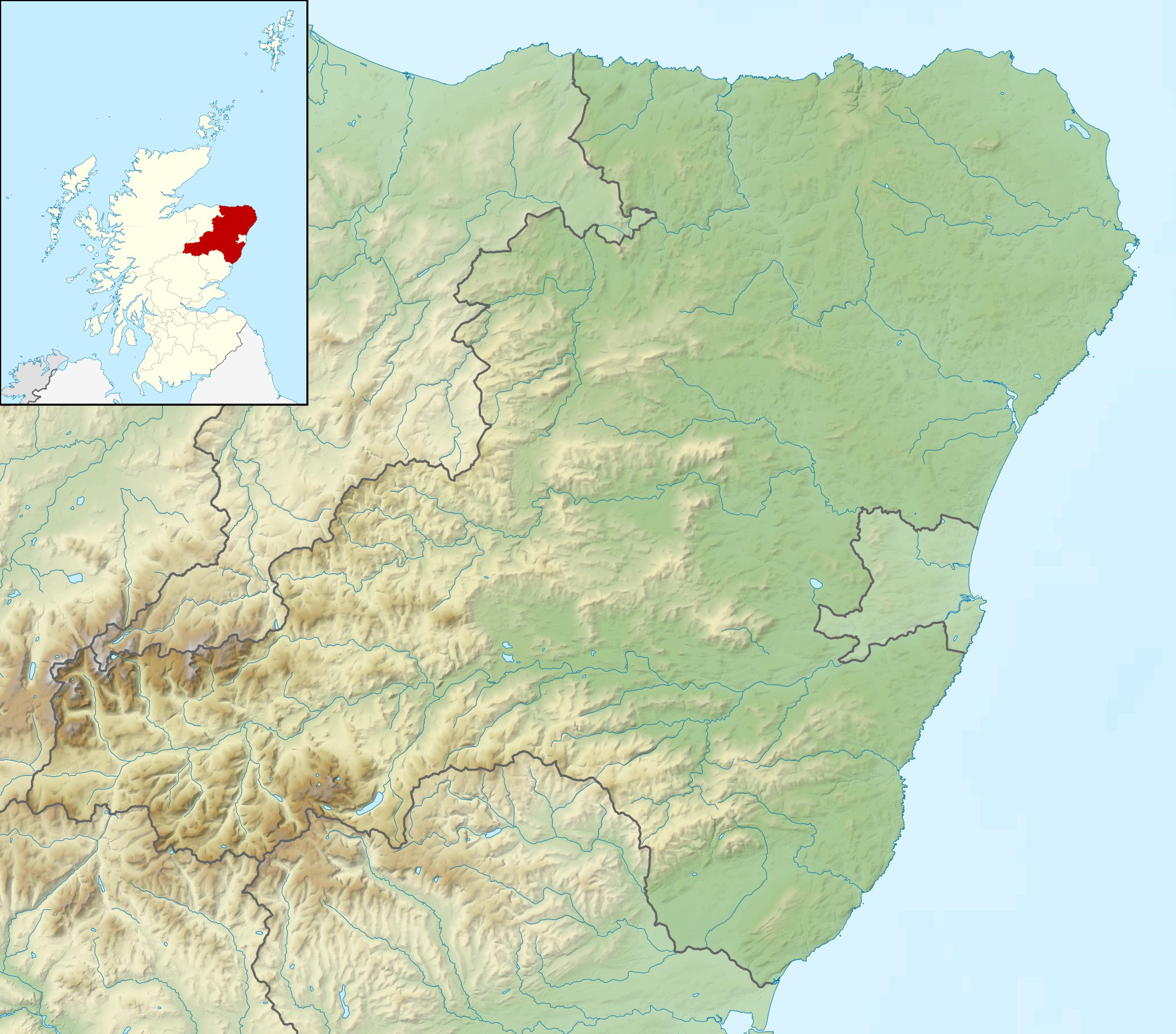
- Location in Scotland Location in Aberdeenshire, Scotland
- 57.518185°N 1.800852°W

Club information
- Location: Craigewan Links, Peterhead, Scotland
- Established: 1841 (185 years ago)
- Type: Private
- Tota holes: 18
- Website: https://www.peterheadgolfclub.co.uk/

Course
- Designed by: Willie Park Jr
- Par: 70
- Length: 6,147 yards (5,621 m)

Peterhead Golf Club, in Peterhead, Aberdeenshire, Scotland, was founded in 1841, making it, by its own claim, the 18th-oldest golf club in the world. Located on the River Ugie, near its mouth at the North Sea, it began in its current Craigewan Links home, which is just over a mile northwest of Peterhead town centre, as a nine-hole course in 1892, designed by Willie Park Jr, dual winner of The Open Championship. Known colloquially as the "Old Course", it was extended to eighteen holes in 1908. A second 18-hole course was established in 1923; however, due to the intervention of World War II, it became neglected about twenty years later and today exists as the nine-hole "New Course".

Today's 18-hole course is par 70 and 6,147 yards. Members and guests who arrive at the club by car park their vehicles on the southern side of the River Ugie on Golf Road, itself off Riverside Drive, Blackhouse Terrace or Ugie Road, depending on the direction of approach. A pedestrian bridge, around 140 feet (47 yards) in length, takes them to the dunes on the northern side of the river. From there, it is about a 450 ft (150 yd) walk due north to the club house.

== Old Course details ==
Peterhead Golf Club (White Tees)
Hole	Name	Par	SSI	Yards	Hole	Name	Par	SSI	Yards
1	Ugie	4	9	339	10	Cottage	3	18	136
2	Ravenscraig	3	17	138	11	Mains	4	6	383
3	Aden	4	11	362	12	Mt. Pleasant	4	12	350
4	Pitfour	4	7	400	13	Scotstown	4	8	409
5	Mount Zion	4	5	385	14	Burn	4	2	413
6	Inverugie	3	15	176	15	Castle	4	10	373
7	Valley	4	13	349	16	Target	3	16	171
8	Rattray	5	3	486	17	Craigewan	4	14	313
9	St. Fergus	4	1	457	18	Home	5	4	498
Out		35		3,103		In		35	3,044
							Out	35	3,103
							Total	70	6,147

== History ==
For about 25 years after the move to Craigewan Links, the only access across the River Ugie to the golf course was by ferry-boat.

In 1894, a dispute began between the club and the landowner on the town side of the river, Colonel Ferguson. He wanted to have control of the ferry and to employ his own ferry-man. Ferguson threatened to withdraw permission for the club to use the golf course, even destroying one of its greens with a plough. A compromise was finally reached, however.

The original clubhouse burned down in the early 1890s. Its replacement, built at the cost of £200, was opened in 1897.

In 1905, a discussion took place regarding the possibility of extending the course along the riverside in the opposite direction. The following year, an agreement was made to purchase part of the adjacent St Fergus Links. By 1908 the course had been extended to eighteen holes.

The ferry lasted until 1925, when a pedestrian bridge (the George Birnie Memorial Bridge) was built across the river. The bridge was replaced again in 1990.

In 1926, a shelter and tea-room were erected near the 16th green. The following year, an extension to the clubhouse was approved, as well as a shop and a workshop for the green keeper.

In 1969, a new clubhouse was opened. It was expanded nine years later, and rebuilt in 1996.

== Gallery ==
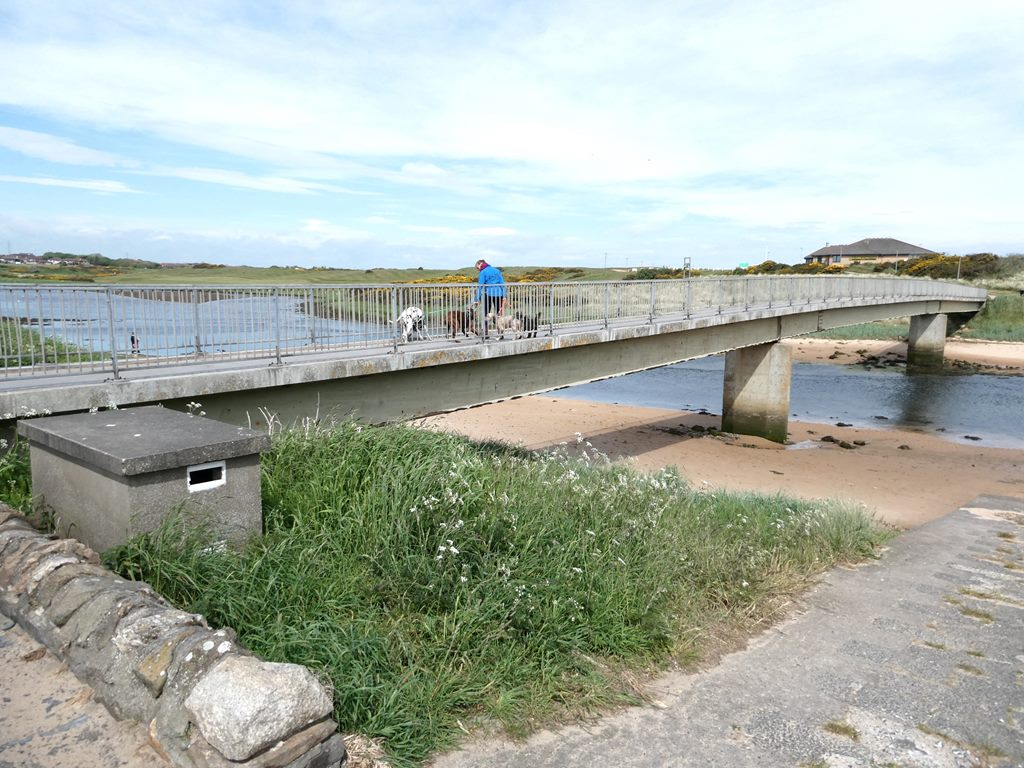
George Birnie Memorial Bridge
