= Gordon Burnham =

American-born English cricketer (1886–1964)

Personal information
- Full name: Gordon le Roy Burnham
- Born: 18 December 1886; New York City, New York, United States
- Died: 1 September 1964 (aged 77); Gessenay, Bern, Switzerland
- Batting: Unknown
- Bowling: Unknown

Domestic team information
- Years: Team
- 1914: Sussex
- 1910/11: Europeans (India)

Career statistics
Competition	First-class
Matches	3
Runs scored	42
Batting average	10.50
100s/50s	–/–
Top score	18
Balls bowled	120
Wickets	3
Bowling average	20.00
5 wickets in innings	–
10 wickets in match	–
Best bowling	2/48
Catches/stumpings	2/–
- Source: ESPNcricinfo, 26 February 2012

Gordon le Roy Burnham (18 December 1886 – 1 September 1964) was an American born English cricketer. Burnham's batting and bowling styles are unknown. He was born in New York City.

Burnham served in the British Army, graduating from the Royal Military College in October 1906 with the rank of 2nd Lieutenant, with him entering service with the 6th (Inniskilling) Dragoons. While serving in India in 1910, Burnham made his first-class debut for the Europeans, making two appearances against the Parsees and the Hindus. He scored 42 runs in his two matches, which came at an average of 14.00, with a high score of 18. With the ball, he took 3 wickets at a bowling average of 20.00, with best figures of 2/48. He later played a single first-class match back in England for Sussex against Lancashire in the 1914 County Championship. He batted once in this match, with Burnham being dismissed for a duck by Ralph Whitehead. The start of World War I midway through the 1914 season brought his cricketing career to an end.

In early 1912, Burnham, then a captain, was appointed an Aide-de-Camp to the Governor-General of Australia. He had some success in golf tournaments during his time in Australia. In 1912 he finished 5th in the Australian Open and was runner-up in the Australian Amateur a few days later. In 1913 he reached the semi-final of the Australian Amateur and won the Victorian Amateur Championship.

By November 1914, Burnham was again serving with the 6th (Inniskilling) Dragoons, this time with the rank of Captain. Burnham survived the First World War, but did not resume his cricketing career after it. He died at Gessenay, Bern, Switzerland, on 1 September 1964.
