= 2012 PGA Tour of Australasia =

Golf tour season

2012 PGA Tour of Australasia season
- Duration: 5 January 2012 – 16 December 2012
- Number of official events: 13
- Order of Merit: (Australia) Peter Senior

The 2012 PGA Tour of Australasia was the 39th season on the PGA Tour of Australasia, the main professional golf tour in Australia and New Zealand since it was formed in 1973.

== Schedule ==
The following table lists official events during the 2012 season.

Date	Tournament	Location	Purse (A$)	Winner (Note: The number in brackets after each winner's name is the number of PGA Tour of Australasia events they had won up to and including that tournament. This information is only shown for PGA Tour of Australasia members.)	OWGR points	Other tours (Note: EUR − European Tour; ONE − OneAsia Tour.)	Notes
8 Jan	Victorian Open	Victoria	125,000	(Australia) Scott Arnold (1)	6		
19 Feb	Adroit Insurance Group Victorian PGA Championship	Victoria	120,000	(New Zealand) Gareth Paddison (3)	6		
26 Feb	Coca-Cola Queensland PGA Championship	Queensland	115,000	(Australia) Andrew Tschudin (1)	6		
1 Apr	New Zealand PGA Pro-Am Championship	New Zealand	NZ$450,000	(New Zealand) Michael Hendry (1)	6		
29 Sep	South Pacific Golf Open Championship	New Caledonia	120,000	(New Zealand) Brad Shilton (1)	6		
14 Oct	WA Goldfields PGA Championship	Western Australia	110,000	(Australia) Peter Wilson (1)	6		
21 Oct	ISPS Handa Perth International	Western Australia	US$2,000,000	(United States) Bo Van Pelt (n/a)	22	EUR	New tournament
28 Oct	John Hughes Geely/Nexus Risk Services WA Open	Western Australia	110,000	(Australia) Oliver Goss (a) (1)	6		
18 Nov	Talisker Masters	Victoria	1,000,000	(Australia) Adam Scott (3)	20		
25 Nov	BMW New Zealand Open	New Zealand	NZ$400,000	(Australia) Jake Higginbottom (a) (1)	16		
2 Dec	NSW PGA Championship	New South Wales	100,000	(Australia) Matt Stieger (1)	6		
9 Dec	Emirates Australian Open	New South Wales	1,250,000	(Australia) Peter Senior (20)	32	ONE	Flagship event
16 Dec	Australian PGA Championship	Queensland	1,500,000	(Australia) Daniel Popovic (1)	18	ONE	

== Order of Merit ==
The Order of Merit was based on prize money won during the season, calculated in Australian dollars.

Position	Player	Prize money (A$)
1	(Australia) Peter Senior	268,292
2	(New Zealand) Michael Hendry	249,625
3	(Australia) Daniel Popovic	238,858
4	(Australia) Adam Scott	199,750
5	(New Zealand) Mark Brown	144,439
