= Matt Jager =

Australian golfer

Matt Jager (born 11 August 1988) is an Australian golfer who won the Australian Amateur in 2010. He also won the New Zealand Amateur in 2009 and 2010.

Jager turned professional and played on the Canadian Tour in 2012.

== Team appearances ==
Amateur

- Nomura Cup (representing Australia): 2009
- Eisenhower Trophy (representing Australia): 2010
- Sloan Morpeth Trophy (representing Australia): 2009 (winners)
