= Royal Perth Golf Club =

Golf club in Perth, Western Australia

- Interactive map of Royal Perth Golf Club

Club information
- Established: 1895; 131 years ago
- Type: private
- Website: https://www.rpgc.com.au/

Royal Perth Golf Club is a golf club in South Perth, Western Australia.

The club started in the 1895 and was established in South Perth in 1909. It was granted permission to use the appellation "Royal" in 1937.

== See also ==
- List of golf clubs granted Royal status
- List of Australian organisations with royal patronage
