= Hugh MacNeil =

New Zealand cricketer (1860–1924)

- Hugh MacNeil (left) and the Rev. W. Maconochie, Sydney golf champions, 1898

Personal information
- Born: 26 October 1860; Glasgow, Scotland
- Died: 14 September 1924 (aged 63); Townsville, Australia
- Batting: Right-handed

Domestic team information
- Years: Team
- 1877/78–1893/94: Otago

Career statistics
Competition	First-class
Matches	8
Runs scored	167
Batting average	10.43
100s/50s	0/1
Top score	58
Balls bowled	717
Wickets	17
Bowling average	13.53
5 wickets in innings	1
10 wickets in match	0
Best bowling	6/25
Catches/stumpings	7/–
- Source: ESPNcricinfo, 15 January 2018

Hugh MacNeil (26 October 1860 – 14 September 1924) was a New Zealand cricketer, golfer and businessman.

== Life and business career ==
Hugh MacNeil was born at Glasgow in 1860, his parents' second son. The family migrated to Dunedin in New Zealand in 1865. He was educated at Otago Boys' High School and Christ's College, Christchurch.

His father, also Hugh MacNeil, founded the retail company Briscoe and Co. Young Hugh spent his working career with the company, eventually becoming the governing director for Australia and New Zealand. He married Ellie Rutherford in Sydney in November 1884.

== Cricket career ==
MacNeil played eight first-class matches for Otago between the 1877–78 and 1893–94 seasons. He made his highest score in the match against Canterbury in 1882–83, when he top-scored in each innings for Otago with 58 and 24, as well as taking four wickets. Otago nevertheless lost by four runs. He took his best first-class bowling figures of 6 for 25 to dismiss the visiting Tasmanians for 40 in 1883–84 and set up Otago's victory.

MacNeil achieved his greatest performances in two non-first-class matches against touring Australian teams, when Otago fielded 22 players against the Australians' 11. Against the 1877–78 Australians, when he was 17 years old, he made the highest score on either side with 28 in a low-scoring draw. He repeated the feat in 1880-81, this time with 44 in the second innings, and also took 5 for 28 with the ball in the Australians' first innings. This time the Australians won, by 44 runs. For making the highest score in the match he received a trophy valued at ten guineas.

== Golf career ==
MacNeil won the New Zealand Amateur golf championship in 1894 and was runner-up in 1896 and 1900. After moving to Australia he won the New South Wales Amateur Championship in 1898 and 1899. In 1902 he won the Australian Amateur championship. The 1902 Victorian Amateur Championship was played concurrently with the Australian Amateur, so that he also became the Victorian Amateur Champion. He represented New South Wales in the Australian Men's Interstate Teams Matches in 1904, 1905 and 1908. He was a life member of Royal Sydney Golf Club.

== Death ==
After suffering from bronchial ailments for some time, MacNeil took a trip to Queensland in the hope the climate would help him recuperate, but he died in Townsville at the age of 63. He had been retired for several years.

He and his wife had two daughters and two sons.
