= Lake Karrinyup Country Club =

Golf club in Perth, Western Australia

- Interactive map of Lake Karrinyup Country Club
- 31.8616°S 115.7853°E

Club information
- Location: Karrinyup, Western Australia
- Established: 1928; 98 years ago
- Type: Private
- Tota holes: 27
- Tournaments: Australian Open (1952, 1960, 1968, 1974); Lake Karrinyup Bowl (1962-63); Johnnie Walker Classic (2002–03); Perth International (2012–19)
- Website: Lake Karrinyup Country Club

Championship Course
- Designed by: Alex Russell
- Par: 72
- Length: 6,531 metres (7,142 yards)
- Course rating: 75
- Course record: 63 (Retief Goosen, 2002; Craig Spence, 2003)

Lake Karrinyup Country Club is a private golf club located in Karrinyup, Western Australia. The golf club consists of an 18-hole championship golf course, and a 9-hole "short course". The championship layout at Lake Karrinyup was founded in 1928, designed by Alex Russell who was the Australian partner of the famed golf course architect, Alister MacKenzie.

== Course ==
=== Overview ===
The championship course is a par-72 layout that winds its way through undulating ground, native gum-trees, and indigenous vegetation. Designed by Alex Russell in 1928 and opened for play in 1930, the course has seen a number of changes in its lifetime. The most significant changes occurred between 2007 and 2008, when Michael Clayton Golf Design was enlisted to undertake a significant overhaul of the golf course to return it, aesthetically and architecturally, to Alex Russell's principles.

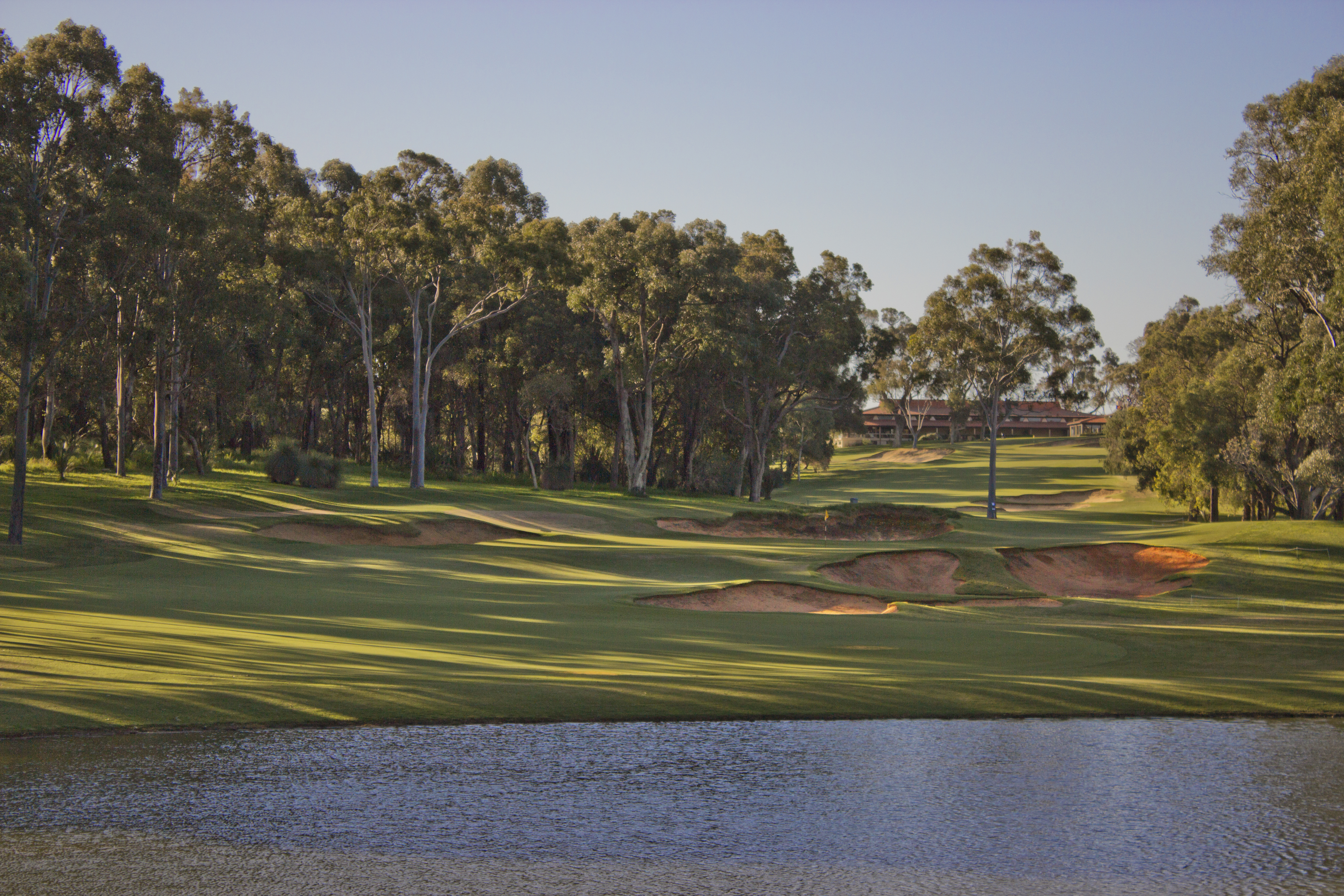
The signature 8th hole from the tee

Dominated by the lake from which the course gets its name, the most memorable holes are ones which run adjacent to and over this natural feature. The signature 8th hole is a 201-metre par 3 which requires a shot that carries the lake onto a raised green. Also notable is the 507-metre (554 yd) par-5 3rd hole which is flanked along its length by the lake, and the short 302-metre (330 yd) par-4 14th which, due to clever bunkering, presents a number of options off the tee.

=== Scorecard ===
The championship course scorecard is as follows. Please note that all measurements are from the Black (Championship) tees.

Hole #	Par	Meters	Yards
1	4	294	322
2	4	428	468
3	5	507	554
4	4	388	424
5	3	179	196
6	4	415	454
7	5	560	612
8	3	201	220
9	4	344	376
Out	36	3316	3626

Hole #	Par	Meters	Yards
10	4	337	369
11	5	506	553
12	3	135	148
13	4	414	453
14	4	302	330
15	5	487	533
16	4	428	468
17	3	200	219
18	4	406	444
In	36	3215	3516
Total	72	6531	7142

=== Course Record ===
The course record of 63 is shared and was initially achieved by South African, Retief Goosen, playing in the 2002 Johnnie Walker Classic. The record was then equalled in the same event the following year by Australian golfer Craig Spence.

=== Rankings ===
Lake Karrinyup is consistently ranked as one of the top 20 courses in Australia. A slip in its ranking early in the 2000s was part of the motive for the Clayton redesign.

== Events ==
Lake Karrinyup has played host to four Australian Opens (1952, 1960, 1968, 1974), two Lake Karrinyup Bowls (1963, 1964), two Johnnie Walker Classics (2002, 2003), and was the venue for the Perth International since 2012.
