= James Howden (rugby union) =

New Zealand rugby union player

- Born: 25 August 1900 Glasgow, Scotland
- Died: 12 March 1978 (aged 77) Waimate, New Zealand
- Weight: 78 kg (172 lb)

Rugby union career
- Position: Hooker
Provincial / State sides
Years	Team	Apps	(Points)
1926–28	Southland	12	
International career
Years	Team	Apps	(Points)
1928	New Zealand	(0)	(0)

James Howden (25 August 1900 – 12 March 1978) was a New Zealand rugby union player. A hooker, Howden represented Southland in 12 games at the provincial level between 1926 and 1928. He played just one match for the New Zealand national side, the All Blacks, against a combined West Coast-Buller side at Greymouth in 1928. He did not appear in any Test matches.
