= The Australian Golf Club =

Golf club in Sydney, Australia

- Interactive map of The Australian Golf Club
- 33°55′4″S 151°12′54″E

Club information
- Location: Sydney, Australia
- Established: 1882; 144 years ago
- Type: Private
- Total holes: 18
- Tournaments: Australian Open
- Website: www.australiangolfclub.com
- Designed by: Clark, Hutchison & Martin (1903) / Jack Nicklaus (1976) / Jack Nicklaus (2013)
- Par: 72
- Length: 6610m
- Course rating: 76
- Course record: 61 (Rod Pampling)

The Australian Golf Club is a golf club located in Rosebery, a suburb of Sydney, Australia. Although it survived numerous course location changes, it is arguably the oldest golf club in Australia. To date, the course has held 22 Australian Open events, and most recently in 2023, the event was won by Chilean Joaquín Niemann. The course has been rated the 9th best in the country.

== Course ==
=== Early history ===
The Australian Golf Club was founded in 1882, which makes it the oldest golf club in Australia followed by Royal Melbourne Golf Club (founded 1891). However, The Australian did not have a golf course between the years of 1888 and 1895, which has led to debate as to which golf club is the oldest.

The club's first golf course was situated in Moore Park, a suburb of Sydney, but due to a new road the course had to be abandoned six years later in 1888. In 1895 a second, eleven-hole course was built in Waverley, which was used until 1898, when the club's lease expired. The course then moved to Botany, Sydney. It was this course that hosted the 1901 Australian Amateur Championship, and the first Australian Open in 1904.

=== Present day course ===
The present day location of the course was inspected in 1903, while a year later plans were put forward for the new course by Carnegie Clark, Jock Hutchison and Gilbert Martin. In 1926, Alister MacKenzie, designer of courses such as Royal Melbourne Golf Club and Augusta National Golf Club, was asked to update holes on the course. Due to the popularity of the course, members approved a new layout in 1949 which supplied the club with two starting holes. In 1967, the proposal of a new road threatened the land on which the course was laid out on. As a result, a redesign by Sloane Morpeth was needed, which was completed in 1973. Between 1977 and 1980, Jack Nicklaus made significant alterations to the course, which included adding length and water hazards, which transformed the course into what it is today.

Present works are under way to improve the course, including the re-routing of a number of holes. The changes will create a more contemporary feel. The club has again commissioned Jack Nicklaus to design the changes, and the course is set to re-open in autumn of 2013.

== Course scorecard ==
The Australian Golf Club
Tee	Rating/Slope	1	2	3	4	5	6	7	8	9	Out	10	11	12	13	14	15	16	17	18	In	Total
Par		5	3	4	3	5	4	4	4	4	36	4	3	4	4	5	3	4	4	5	36	72
Championship	76	455	194	343	186	551	386	382	405	422	3324	378	175	385	349	510	188	431	392	478	3286	6610
Blue	75	455	168	343	159	542	386	382	405	405	3245	378	175	370	349	510	188	387	392	478	3227	6454
Men's	73	442	162	325	141	492	379	358	392	396	3087	363	155	356	344	487	174	375	371	463	3088	6175
Ladies	75	403	146	291	102	453	366	307	374	305	2747	309	120	278	323	463	155	353	309	430	2740	5487

== Tournaments ==
The Australian Golf Club has held 20 Australian Opens, with the most recent being from the 23–26 November 2017, which was won by Cameron Davis with a score of 11 under par. The various winners of Australian Opens at The Australian are as follows:

Year	Winner	Year	Winner
1904	(England) Michael Scott (a)	1977	(Australia) David Graham
1908	(Australia) Clyde Pearce	1978	(United States) Jack Nicklaus
1920	(Australia) Joe Kirkwood Sr.	1982	(Australia) Bob Shearer
1925	(Australia) Fred Popplewell	1990	(United States) John Morse
1931	(Australia) Ivo Whitton (a)	1996	(Australia) Greg Norman
1937	(Australia) George Naismith	2004	(Australia) Peter Lonard
1949	(Australia) Eric Cremin	2007	(Australia) Craig Parry
1959	(Australia) Kel Nagle	2014	(United States) Jordan Spieth
1975	(United States) Jack Nicklaus	2015	(Australia) Matt Jones
1976	(United States) Jack Nicklaus	2017	(Australia) Cameron Davis

The Australian has also hosted 13 Australian Amateur Championships – the first in 1901, and the most recent in 2015.

== See also ==
- List of golf courses designed by Jack Nicklaus
- Golf in Australia
