= Stroke play =

Scoring system in golf

Stroke play is a scoring system in the sport of golf. In the regular form of stroke play, also known as medal play, the total number of strokes is counted over one or more rounds of 18 holes. In a regular stroke play competition, the winner is the player who has taken the fewest strokes over the course of the round, or rounds. Other forms of stroke play include Stableford, whereby points are gained based on hole scores, maximum score, in which there is a limit to the number of strokes that may be taken on each hole, and par (or bogey), where holes are won or lost against a target score on each hole.

Although most professional tournaments are played using the regular stroke play scoring system, some notable exceptions exist. In match play, the player, or team, earns a point for each hole in which they have bested their opponents. Match play scoring is used in the WGC Match Play, the Volvo World Match Play Championship, and most team events, for example the Ryder Cup. A few tournaments such as the Barracuda Championship have used a modified Stableford system.

== Scoring ==
In stroke play scoring, players record the number of strokes taken at each hole and total them up at the end of a given round, or rounds. The player with the lowest total is the winner. In handicap competitions, the players would subtract their handicaps from the total (gross) score to generate their net scores, and the player with the lowest net score is the winner.

Scores may be reported in relation to par for easy comparison with other golfers' scores. For example, a player whose score is three strokes over par after a given hole would appear as "+3" on the scoreboard.

If two or more players have the same number of strokes, it may be desired to determine an outright winner. Two of the more common methods are a playoff and scorecard count back.

=== Cut ===
Multi-round tournaments may enforce a "cut" to reduce the size of the field for later rounds. In a typical 72-hole elite tournament, played over one or two courses, there is a cut after 36 holes; tournaments played over three courses have a cut after 54 holes. The number of players who make the cut depends on the tournament rules – in a typical PGA Tour event, the top 65 (formerly the top 70) professionals (plus ties) after 36 holes. Any player who returns a score higher than the cut mark takes no further part in the tournament.

Tournaments may also employ another cut after 54 holes if a large number of players make the 36-hole cut. Players missing this cut are designated as "made cut, did not finish" (MDF). The PGA Tour employed a secondary cut prior to reducing the cut line to the top 65 for the 2020–21 season.

=== Playoff ===
One of the most common methods for settling ties is by means of a playoff, whereby those players who have tied for the lead replay a set number of holes.If still tied after those holes, then further sudden-death holes may also be played until a winner emerges.

Ties in professional golf are generally settled by means of a playoff. Different tournaments have various formats for their playoffs, ranging from another full round, as employed in the U.S. Open, through to a three- or four-hole playoff as used in the PGA Championship and the Open Championship (British Open), to straightforward sudden death, which is used in most tournaments including the Masters Tournament and all other regular PGA Tour and European Tour events. In a sudden-death playoff with more than two players, any player who fails to at least tie for the best score after each hole is eliminated and (if applicable) the playoff continues with only those players who are still tied for the best score. In the longer playoff formats, if at least two players remain tied after such a playoff then play generally continues in sudden-death format.

==== Count back ====
One method of breaking ties commonly used in amateur competitions, especially when a playoff is not practical, and used in professional tournaments to seed players in knockout rounds (such as the World Super 6 in Perth, Australia) is a scorecard "count back", whereby the player with the lowest cumulative score over the last 18, 9, 6, 3, or 1 hole(s) is declared the winner.

== See also ==
- Variations of golf
