= Michael Scott (golfer) =

English amateur golfer (1878–1959)

Personal information
- Nationality: England
- Born: 31 August 1878
- Died: 9 January 1959 (aged 80)

Career
- Sport: Golf
- Status: Amateur
- Professional wins: 2

Best results in major championships (wins: 1)
- Masters Tournament: DNP
- U.S. Open: DNP
- The Open Championship: T20: 1922
- U.S. Amateur: DNQ
- British Amateur: Won: 1933

The Hon. Michael Scott OBE (31 August 1878 – 9 January 1959) was an English amateur golfer, most famous for being the oldest winner of The Amateur Championship.

== Early life ==
Scott was the son of John Scott, 3rd Earl of Eldon, and the youngest of seven children. He attended Winchester College.

Several of Scott's siblings were also golfers. The most famous was Lady Margaret Scott, a dominant player in early women's golf who won the first three British Ladies Championships from 1893 to 1895 before retiring from tournament play. Osmund Scott was the runner-up at the 1905 Amateur Championship, and Denys Scott also competed.

== Golf career ==
Scott emigrated to Australia in about 1900 but returned to the United Kingdom between July 1906 and early 1907, missing the main Australian golf events of 1906. Scott won a number of important amateur tournaments in Australia, including four Australian Amateur titles (1905, 1907, 1909, and 1910), six Victorian Amateur Championship titles (all between 1904 and 1910), and several others. He won the inaugural Australian Open in 1904, and again in 1907. He returned to England in 1911.

Scott fought in World War I, and was decorated with the Order of Aviz of Portugal and the Order of the Black Star of France. In 1918, he was invested as an Officer of the Order of the British Empire.

While he won the French Amateur in 1912 and 1922, Scott was not able to win in England itself, though he was a member of Great Britain's 1924 Walker Cup team. Finally, in 1933 when he was nearly 55 years old, he won The Amateur Championship by beating Thomas A. Bourn 4 & 3 at Hoylake. The following year, Scott played for and captained the 1934 Walker Cup team, setting the record for the oldest player in that event as well (which still stands). He later won a West of England Amateur title at the age of 57, and was the Captain at Royal St George's Golf Club.

== Personal life ==
Scott was married three times, had at least one daughter, and died at the age of 80 in 1959.

== Tournament wins ==
- 1904 Australian Open, Victorian Amateur
- 1905 Australian Amateur, Victorian Amateur, Surrey Hills Gentlemen's Championship
- 1907 Australian Amateur, Australian Open, Victorian Amateur
- 1908 Victorian Amateur
- 1909 Australian Amateur, Victorian Amateur, New South Wales Amateur
- 1910 Australian Amateur, Victorian Amateur, New South Wales Amateur
- 1912 French Amateur
- 1913 West of England Amateur
- 1919 West of England Amateur
- 1922 French Amateur, West of England Amateur
- 1933 **The Amateur Championship**
- 1934 West of England Amateur

Note: major championship win in bold

== Major championships ==
=== Amateur wins (1) ===
Year	Championship	Winning score	Runner-up
1933	The Amateur Championship	4 & 3	(England) Dale Bourn

=== Results timeline ===
Tournament	1911	1912	1913	1914	1915	1916	1917	1918	1919
The Open Championship	T41	T37 LA			NT	NT	NT	NT	NT
The Amateur Championship	R128	QF	R64	R16	NT	NT	NT	NT	NT
U.S. Amateur							NT	NT	

Tournament	1920	1921	1922	1923	1924	1925	1926	1927	1928	1929
The Open Championship	60		T20 LA							
The Amateur Championship	SF			R64	R128	R16	R16	R128	R256	QF
U.S. Amateur					DNQ					

Tournament	1930	1931	1932	1933	1934	1935	1936	1937	1938	1939
The Open Championship			WD							
The Amateur Championship	R16	R256	R128	**1**	R256	R128	R256	R128	R256	R256
U.S. Amateur										

Tournament	1940	1941	1942	1943	1944	1945	1946	1947
The Open Championship	NT	NT	NT	NT	NT	NT		
The Amateur Championship	NT	NT	NT	NT	NT	NT	R256	R128
U.S. Amateur			NT	NT	NT	NT		

Note: Scott played in only The Open Championship, the U.S. Amateur, and The Amateur Championship.

Win
Top 10
Did not play

LA = Low amateur
NT = No tournament
DNQ = Did not qualify for match play portion
R256, R128, R64, R32, R16, QF, SF = Round in which player lost in match play
"T" indicates a tie for a place

Source for British Open: www.opengolf.com

Source for 1911 British Amateur: The American Golfer, July 1911, p. 180.

Source for 1912 British Amateur: The American Golfer, July 1912, p. 199.

Source for 1913 British Amateur: The American Golfer, July 1913, p. 224.

Source for 1914 British Amateur: Golf Illustrated, July 1914, p. 29.

Source for 1920 British Amateur: The American Golfer, 19 June 1920, p. 9.

Source for 1923 British Amateur: The Glasgow Herald, 10 May 1923, p. 15.

Source for 1924 British Amateur: The Glasgow Herald, 29 May 1924, p. 13.

Source for 1924 U.S. Amateur: USGA Championship Database

Source for 1925 British Amateur: The Glasgow Herald, 28 May 1925, p. 9.

Source for 1926 British Amateur: The Glasgow Herald, 28 May 1926, p. 8.

Source for 1927 British Amateur: The Glasgow Herald, 25 May 1927, p. 4.

Source for 1928 British Amateur: The Glasgow Herald, 22 May 1928, p. 4.

Source for 1929 British Amateur: The Glasgow Herald, 15 June 1929, p. 8.

Source for 1930 British Amateur: The Glasgow Herald, 30 May 1930, p. 13.

Source for 1931 British Amateur: The Glasgow Herald, 19 May 1931, p. 17.

Source for 1932 British Amateur: The Glasgow Herald, 25 May 1932, p. 6.

Source for 1934 British Amateur: The Glasgow Herald, 22 May 1934, p. 10.

Source for 1935 British Amateur: The Glasgow Herald, 22 May 1935, p. 7.

Source for 1936 British Amateur: The Glasgow Herald, 27 May 1936, p. 6.

Source for 1937 British Amateur: The Glasgow Herald, 26 May 1937, p. 23.

Source for 1938 British Amateur: The Glasgow Herald, 24 May 1938, p. 3.

Source for 1939 British Amateur: The Glasgow Herald, 23 May 1939, p. 17.

Source for 1946 British Amateur: The Glasgow Herald, 29 May 1946, p. 2.

Source for 1947 British Amateur: The Glasgow Herald, 28 May 1947, p. 6.

== Team appearances ==
- Walker Cup (representing Great Britain & Ireland): 1924, 1934 (playing captain)
- England–Scotland Amateur Match (representing England): 1911, 1912, 1923, 1924 (winners), 1925 (winners), 1926 (winners)
- Coronation Match (representing the Amateurs): 1911
- Australian Men's Interstate Teams Matches (representing Victoria): 1904, 1905 (winners), 1907 (winners), 1908 (winners), 1909 (winners)
