= Par (golf scoring format) =

Scoring system used in the sport of golf

Par, or bogey, is a scoring system used mostly in amateur and club golf. It is a stroke play format played against the course, with match play scoring based on the number of strokes taken on each hole compared to a fixed score, usually the par or bogey; in this context, bogey is meant in the traditional sense as the score a good player would expect on the hole, usually par but occasionally one stroke more. The winner of the competition is the player with the highest differential of holes "won" to holes "lost", with the result on each hole normally based on the players handicap-adjusted score.

Par has similarities to the popular Stableford scoring system in that competition is against the course on a hole-by-hole basis, and the occasional very bad hole does not massively affect the overall result. Because of this it also has the same advantage of improving pace of play in large club competitions as holing out is not required once the hole is lost. Unlike Stableford however, there is no reward for a handicap-adjusted eagle (or better).
