= Australian Men's Interstate Teams Matches =

Amateur team golf tournament

Tournament information
- Established: 1904
- Course: Tasmania Golf Club (2019)
- Format: Team match play
- Final year: 2019

Final champion
- Victoria

The Australian Men's Interstate Teams Matches were an amateur team golf competition for men between the states and territories of Australia.

The event started in 1904 when New South Wales played Victoria. Until World War II the event was played as part of the championship meeting which included the Australian Amateur. It was not until 1947 that all six states, New South Wales, Queensland, South Australia, Tasmania, Victoria, and Western Australia, contested the event together. Northern Territory first played in 2015 increasing the number of teams to seven. The final format was a round-robin tournament, each team playing the other six teams, after which the top two teams play a final. Each team consisted of eight players. Seven competed in each round-robin match with all eight playing in the final. Only singles matches were played.

In 2020 the format for interstate team matches was changed so that the men's and women's event were combined into a single mixed-team event, the Australian Interstate Teams Matches.

== History ==
The first match was played between New South Wales and Victoria at The Australian Golf Club on the afternoon of 1 September 1904, the day before the inaugural Australian Open started on the same course. Eight 18-hole singles matches were played. All matches were played out over the full 18 holes. Dan Soutar and Jim Howden halved the top match but New South Wales won 5 of the remaining 7 matches, winning by 11 holes to 6.

The first tournament was arranged in 1905 at Royal Melbourne, two days before the Australian Open there. It was hoped that Tasmania would enter but they were unable to raise a team. Victoria and South Australia were drawn in the morning semi-final, the winner meeting New South Wales in the final in the afternoon. There were teams of 6, playing singles. Victoria won the semi-final 6–0 and went on to beat New South Wales 4–1 with one match halved. Victoria won by 7 holes to 1. In 1906 at Royal Sydney only New South Wales and Victoria competed, the match being played the day after the final of the Australian Amateur. Victoria won 3–2 with one match halved, winning by 13 holes to 4. Three players each from Tasmania and Queensland played a match against a team of Royal Sydney members. The two finalists in the Australian Amateur, Ernest Gill, from Queensland, and Tasmanian Clyde Pearce both lost their matches.

Four teams contested the 1907 tournament at Royal Melbourne. The two semi-finals were very one-sided with Victoria winning all six matches against Tasmania and New South Wales only losing one match against South Australia, Bill Gunson beating Neptune Christoe. Victoria won the final 4–2, while Tasmania won a consolation match against South Australia. Only three teams entered at The Australian in 1908, South Australia getting a bye to the final. Victoria beat New South Wales 4–2 and went on to beat South Australia 6–0 in the final. Both Australian Amateur finalists, Clyde Pearce and Neptune Christoe, representing New South Wales, lost their matches against Victoria. Tasmania was able to raise a team in 1909 when the championship meeting returned to Royal Melbourne. In the morning semi-finals Victoria beat South Australia 6–0 while Tasmania beat New South Wales 5–1. Victoria beat Tasmania 4–2 in the final despite Clyde Pearce beating Michael Scott and his brother, Bruce, beating Jim Howden in the top two matches.

From 1910 the format was revised with teams of seven, the result being decided solely by the number of matches won. Extra holes were played to ensure a result in each match. In 1910 the championship meeting was held in Adelaide for the first time with the interstate tournament being played after the amateur championship. There were only a limited number of New South Wales players at the meeting and, with some having already left for home, they were unable to raise a team. Tasmania were also unable to field a side so there were only two teams, Victoria and South Australia, Victoria were without the amateur champion Michael Scott but still won 5–2. There were also only two teams at Royal Sydney in 1911, New South Wales beating Victoria 6–1, their first tournament win since 1904. Jim Howden beat Eric Apperly by one hole in the top match but Victoria lost all the remaining matches.

There were four teams when the event returned to Royal Melbourne in 1912. Victoria and New South Wales were drawn together in the semi-finals. Victoria won 4–3, winning two of their matches after extra holes. They went on to win the final against Tasmania, losing just one match. Tasmania had beaten South Australia 5–2 earlier in the day. The 1913 championship meeting was originally planned to be played at The Australian, but was moved to Royal Melbourne because of a smallpox outbreak and the poor condition of the course, caused by wet weather. There were less players from outside Victoria and only two teams, Victoria and South Australia, could raise a team. Victoria won by 6 matches to 1.

The format for the event was maintained between 1920 and 1939, as it continued to be played as part of the championship meeting. New South Wales and Victoria had a team each year. South Australia generally entered a team, although missing sometimes when it was held in Sydney. Queensland first entered a team in 1925 and occasionally entered afterwards when the event was in Sydney. The number of team was never more than four in this period, meaning that the event was always completed in a single day with semi-finals in the morning and the final in the afternoon. In 1924, Tasmania beat a weak New South Wales team, before losing to Victoria in the final. The 1926 event was in Adelaide and South Australia won a close semi-final against New South Wales before losing to Victoria. South Australia beat Victoria in 1932, again at Royal Adelaide, but lost to New South Wales in the final. South Australia won for the first time in 1935 at Royal Adelaide. They had a bye to the final and beat New South Wales 4–3 in a close contest. Queensland beat South Australia in 1937, their first win, but lost to New South Wales in the final. South Australia won again in 1938, when the meeting returning to Adelaide, beating both Victoria and New South Wales. In 1939, at Royal Melbourne, Western Australia entered a team for the first time and beat South Australia before losing to New South Wales in the final.

Five team entered when the event resumed at Royal Sydney in 1946. This meant that the tournament was extended to a second day for the first time, Queensland beating Victoria on the first day. Queensland then beat South Australia and New South Wales to win the tournament for the first time. There was a major change to the event for 1947. The event changed from a knock-out to a round-robin tournament with all six states playing each other, although there were still seven 18-hole singles matches in each contest between two states. There were five rounds of matches played over three days. It was played before the Australian Amateur, on the same course. New South Wales seemed the likely winner in 1947, after winning their first four matches. However they lost 5–2 to South Australia in their final match. Victoria, New South Wales and South Australia all won four of their five contests but Victoria won the event, having won 27 of their 35 individual matches, compared to the 23 won by the other two teams. Victoria retained the title in 1948, winning all their five matches with. New South Wales winning four.

In 1949 New South Wales won for the first time since 1937. They reversed the result of the previous year, winning all their matches, beating Victoria on the final day, who also won their other four matches. New South Wales retained the title in 1950, despite losing a close match to Victoria. Both New South Wales and Victoria won four matches but New South Wales had won 24 of the individual matches while Victoria had only won 23. New South Wales won again in 1951 winning all their matches. Victoria and Tasmania won three matches each, Victoria winning 21 individual matches to the 18 won by Tasmania. New South Wales won for the fourth successive year in 1952 winning all their matches. Victoria and Queensland each won three matches but Victoria won 21 individual matches to the 19 won by Queensland. The Western Australian Golf Association presented a perpetual trophy to commemorate the first event held in the state.

Victoria won from 1953 to 1955. In 1953 they beat New South Wales in the final match. Victoria won four matches while New South Wales and Queensland won three each. New South Wales won 22 individual matches to Queensland's 21. There was a small change in the format in 1954 when extra holes were dropped, matches being halved. The change was not popular and extra holes returned in 1955. Victoria won again in 1954 despite losing heavily to New South Wales on the final day. New South Wales were runner-up with three wins and a tied match against Tasmania. Queensland hosted for the first time in 1955 and finished runner-up behind Victoria, who won all their matches.

New South Wales won each year from 1956 to 1960, winning 24 of their 25 matches. Their only loss was to Western Australia in 1959. Although beaten by New South Wales each year in this period, Victoria won all their other matches and finished runner-up each time. They tied with New South Wales with four wins each in 1959 but New South Wales won with 24 individual wins to Victoria's 21.

In 1961 Victoria regained the title, beating New South Wales for the first time since 1955. they won all their matches and did so again in 1963. 1962 saw the first tie in the event with New South Wales and South Australia both having four wins and winning 22 individual matches. New South Wales beat South Australia but had earlier lost to Western Australia. The teams were level at the start of the final set of matches, both teams winning their matches 5–2. New South Wales won in 1964 and 1965, winning all their matches both times. There was another tie in 1966 when Queensland and Victoria finished level with four wins and 21 individual match wins. Queensland beat New South Wales 4–3 in the final set of matches while Victoria beat South Australia 5–2. New South Wales won in 1967, despite losing their last match 5–2 to Victoria. Victoria had earlier lost to Western Australia, finishing with 22 individual wins to the 24 of New South Wales.

In 1968 the event was held in Tasmania for the first time and the hosts won all their matches to win the title for the first time. New South Wales won in 1969 and 1970, being undefeated in both years. Western Australia won for the first time in 1971, with Tasmania runners-up, the first time that neither New South Wales or Victoria had been in the top two. New South Wales had further wins in 1972 and 1973 but Tasmania won for a second time when the event return to Tasmania in 1974. There was another home winner in 1975 when South Australia had their first outright win since 1938. New South Wales continued to be the most successful state but after 1973 they wouldn't beat all the other five teams again until 1996. Tasmania won in 1977, their first success outside their home state, while Queensland won in 1979, their first outright win since 1948. From 1979, extra holes were dropped, matches level after 18 holes being halved. Victoria won in 1982, their first outright win since 1963, while South Australia won in 1983.

Foursomes matches were added in 1984. There were 4 foursomes matches in the morning with 7 singles in the afternoon, extending the event to 5 days. Western Australia won for the second time in 1984, finishing level with New South Wales with four wins out of five but with half a point more. They won again in 1988, after the final round of matches were abandoned because of rain. Between 1985 and 1996 the event was won by New South Wales 7 times and Victoria 4 times. Western Australia had further wins in 1997 and 1999 while Queensland won in 2001, 2004 and 2010.

The format was changed in 2011. The foursomes matches were dropped from the round-robin stage. There were 7 singles matches, meaning that two contests could be played each day. After the round-robin the top two teams played a final. In 2011 the final consisted of 4 foursomes and 8 singles. Queensland beat Victoria in the final, although Victoria had led the round-robin stage. In 2012 the foursomes were dropped completely, the final being just 8 singles matches. Northern Territory joined in 2015, increasing the number of rounds to seven, one team having a bye in each round. In 2017 New South Wales won all their round-robinmatches but lost to Victoria in the final. In 2018 the final between Victoria and Queensland was tied, Victoria winning the event as they had led the round-robin stage. Victoria won five times in six years from 2014 to 2019.

== Results ==
Year	Winners	Final	RR	Runners-up	RR	Teams	Venue	Ref.
2019	Victoria	4–4	5–28.5	New South Wales	5–28.5	7	Tasmania	
2018	Victoria	4–4	5–28	Queensland	4.5–27.5	7	The Grange	
2017	Victoria	4.5–3.5	5–26.5	New South Wales	6–32.5	7	Melville Glades	
2016	New South Wales	4.5–3.5	6–31	Queensland	5–31	7	The Brisbane	
2015	Victoria	5–3	5.5–30.5	Queensland	4.5–25.5	7	Huntingdale	
2014	Victoria	4.5–3.5	5–25	New South Wales	3–17	6	Federal	
2013	Queensland	4.5–3.5	3.5–21.5	New South Wales	3.5–21	6	Tasmania	
2012	New South Wales	5.5–2.5	4–20	Tasmania	3.5–18.5	6	Royal Adelaide	
2011	Queensland	7.5–4.5	3.5–20	Victoria	4–25	6	Royal Perth	
2010	Queensland		4–38.5	Victoria	4–34	6	Oxley	
2009	Victoria		5–39	South Australia	4–30.5	6	Peninsula	
2008	Victoria		4.5–36.5	New South Wales	4–30.5	6	Monash	
2007	New South Wales		5–38.5	Queensland	3–29	6	Launceston	
2006	New South Wales		4–34	Victoria	4–31	6	McCracken	
2005	New South Wales		4–36.5	Victoria	3.5–32	6	Royal Fremantle	
2004	Queensland		4–37.5	Victoria	4–34.5	6	Royal Queensland	
2003	Victoria		4.5–37.5	Queensland	3–31	6	Portsea	
2002	New South Wales		3.5–36.5	Queensland	3.5–31.5	6	Concord	
2001	Queensland		4–27.5	New South Wales	3.5–26	6	Ulverstone	
2000	Victoria		4–38.5	Queensland	3–30.5	6	Glenelg	
1999	Western Australia		4.5–38.5	Victoria	3.5–31	6	Mount Lawley	
1998	New South Wales		4–34.5	Western Australia	4–33.5	6	Pacific	
1997	Western Australia		4.5–33.5	Victoria	3.5–33	6	Commonwealth	
1996	New South Wales		5–42.5	Western Australia	3.5–30.5	6	The Lakes	
1995	New South Wales		3.5–32.5	Western Australia	3–29.5	6	Royal Perth	
1994	Victoria		4–33.5	Western Australia	4–31	6	Victoria	
1993	Victoria		4–33	New South Wales & Western Australia	4–32.5	6	Tasmania	
1992	New South Wales		3.5–25	Western Australia	3–26	6	Kooyonga	
1991	New South Wales		4.5–34	Victoria	3.5–36	6	Royal Perth	
1990	New South Wales		4–31	Queensland	3–33	6	Brisbane	
1989	New South Wales		4–36.5	Queensland & Victoria	3–31.5	6	Keysborough	
1988	Western Australia		3.5–29.5	Queensland	3–27.5	6	Royal Canberra	
1987	Victoria		3.5–33	Tasmania	3.5–29	6	Tasmania	
1986	Victoria		4–31.5	Queensland	3.5–29.5	6	Kooyonga	
1985	New South Wales		4–38	Western Australia	4–31.5	6	Mount Lawley	
1984	Western Australia		4–40	New South Wales	4–39.5	6	Pacific	
1983	South Australia		4–20.5	New South Wales	3–21	6	Peninsula	
1982	Victoria		4.5–21	Queensland	3.5–22	6	Royal Sydney	
1981	New South Wales		3.5–20.5	South Australia	3.5–20	6	Grange	
1980	New South Wales		4–19.5	Tasmania	3–21	6	Royal Hobart	
1979	Queensland		4–20	South Australia	3–18	6	Royal Perth	
1978	New South Wales		4–24	Tasmania	4–21	6	Royal Queensland	
1977	Tasmania		5–25	Victoria	3–20	6	Woodlands	
1976	New South Wales		4–21	South Australia	3–19	6	Pymble	
1975	South Australia		4–21	New South Wales	3–18	6	Kooyonga	
1974	Tasmania		5–25	New South Wales	3–20	6	Tasmanian	
1973	New South Wales		5–22	Queensland	3–21	6	Lake Karrinyup	
1972	New South Wales		4–23	Victoria	3–21	6	Brisbane	
1971	Western Australia		4–23	Tasmania	3–22	6	Metropolitan	
1970	New South Wales		5–26	Victoria	4–20	6	The Australian	
1969	New South Wales		5–26	Victoria	3–21	6	Royal Adelaide	
1968	Tasmania		5–29	New South Wales	3–18	6	Royal Hobart	
1967	New South Wales		4–24	Victoria	4–22	6	Royal Perth	
1966	Queensland & Victoria		4–21	Tie		6	Brisbane	
1965	New South Wales		5–29	Victoria	4–24	6	Royal Melbourne	
1964	New South Wales		5–29	Victoria	3–19	6	The Australian	
1963	Victoria		5–28	New South Wales	4–24	6	Kingston Heath	
1962	New South Wales & South Australia		4–22	Tie		6	Kooyonga	
1961	Victoria		5–28	New South Wales	4–22	6	Royal Melbourne	
1960	New South Wales		5–24	Victoria	4–23	6	Lake Karrinyup	
1959	New South Wales		4–24	Victoria	4–21	6	Royal Sydney	
1958	New South Wales		4–24	Victoria	3–22	6	Royal Adelaide	
1957	New South Wales		5–26	Victoria	4–25	6	Commonwealth	
1956	New South Wales		5–25	Victoria	4–22	6	The Australian	
1955	Victoria		5–27	Queensland	4–26	6	Royal Queensland	
1954	Victoria		4–22	New South Wales	3.5–22	6	Royal Adelaide	
1953	Victoria		4–24	New South Wales	3–22	6	New South Wales	
1952	New South Wales		5–27	Victoria	3–21	6	Lake Karrinyup	
1951	New South Wales		5–23	Victoria	3–21	6	Royal Melbourne	
1950	New South Wales		4–24	Victoria	4–23	6	Royal Adelaide	
1949	New South Wales		5–24	Victoria	4–21	6	Royal Sydney	
1948	Victoria		5–28	New South Wales	4–21	6	Metropolitan	
1947	Victoria		4–27	New South Wales & South Australia	4–23	6	Royal Adelaide	
1946	Queensland	4–3		New South Wales		5	Royal Sydney	
1940–1945: No tournament due to World War II
1939	Victoria	5.5–1.5		Western Australia		4	Royal Melbourne	
1938	South Australia	5–2		New South Wales		4	Royal Adelaide	
1937	New South Wales	5.5–1.5		Queensland		4	The Australian	
1936	Victoria	6–1		New South Wales		4	Metropolitan	
1935	South Australia	4–3		New South Wales		3	Royal Adelaide	
1934	New South Wales	6–1		Victoria		2	Royal Sydney	
1933	Victoria	5–2		New South Wales		3	Royal Melbourne	
1932	New South Wales	5–2		South Australia		3	Royal Adelaide	
1931	Victoria	6–1		Queensland		3	The Australian	
1930	Victoria	5–2		New South Wales		4	Metropolitan	
1929	Victoria	5–2		South Australia		3	Royal Adelaide	
1928	New South Wales	5–2		Victoria		4	Royal Sydney	
1927	Victoria	5–2		New South Wales		3	Royal Melbourne	
1926	Victoria	6–1		South Australia		3	Royal Adelaide	
1925	New South Wales	4–3		Victoria		4	The Australian	
1924	Victoria	6–1		Tasmania		4	Royal Melbourne	
1923	Victoria	4–3		New South Wales		3	Royal Adelaide	
1922	New South Wales	4–3		Victoria		2	Royal Sydney	
1921	Victoria	5–2		New South Wales		4	Royal Melbourne	
1920	New South Wales	4–3		Victoria		2	The Australian	
1914–1919: No tournament due to World War I
1913	Victoria	6–1		South Australia		2	Royal Melbourne	
1912	Victoria	6–1		Tasmania		4	Royal Melbourne	
1911	New South Wales	6–1		Victoria		2	Royal Sydney	
1910	Victoria	5–2		South Australia		2	Royal Adelaide	
1909	Victoria	4–2		Tasmania		4	Royal Melbourne	
1908	Victoria	6–0		South Australia		3	The Australian	
1907	Victoria	4–2		New South Wales		4	Royal Melbourne	
1906	Victoria	3.5–2.5		New South Wales		2	Royal Sydney	
1905	Victoria	4.5–1.5		New South Wales		3	Royal Melbourne	
1904	New South Wales	5.5–2.5		Victoria		2	The Australian	

RR– Team's score in the round-robin stage. Positions were determined by the number of team points and where that was equal by the number of individual match points.

From 1947 to 1983 each team match consisted of 7 singles matches, so that each team played a total of 35 individual matches. From 1984 to 2010 there were an additional 4 foursomes matches, increasing the number of individual matches to 55. In 1988 and 1992 one set of matches was not played because of rain, so that each team only played 4 other teams, with the number of individual matches reduced to 44. In 2001, two sets of foursomes matches were not played, reducing the number of individual matches to 47. In 2008, one set of foursomes matches was not played, reducing the number of individual matches to 51. In 2011 the foursomes were dropped, returning to the format used before 1984. However, a final was introduced between the leading two teams in the round-robin, to decide the winner of the event. Northern Territory joined in 2015, increasing the number of matches played by each team to 6, and individual matches to 42.

== Appearances ==
The following are those who played in at least one of the matches.

=== New South Wales ===
- Kevin Abrahamsen 1961
- John Allerton 1947
- Darin Anderson 2003
- Eric Apperly 1906, 1911, 1912, 1920, 1921, 1922, 1923, 1924, 1925, 1926, 1927, 1928, 1929, 1930, 1931, 1932, 1933, 1935
- Joshua Armstrong 2017, 2018, 2019
- RT Armstrong 1920, 1921, 1925, 1927
- Jamie Arnold 2005, 2006, 2007
- Scott Arnold 2007, 2008
- Jason Ashcroft 1995, 1996, 1997
- RE Bailey 1912
- Barry Baker 1964, 1965, 1966
- Gordon Balcombe 1911, 1921, 1923, 1925, 1927, 1928
- Ted Ball 1960
- Nathan Barbieri 2018, 2019
- Jack Barkel 1935, 1938, 1939, 1948, 1949, 1950, 1951, 1954, 1955
- Kurt Barnes 2002, 2003
- Chris Barrett 1987
- Noel Bartell 1956, 1957, 1958, 1962, 1963, 1964, 1965, 1966
- Geoff Barwick 1972
- Lucas Bates 2002
- Austin Bautista 2016
- Darren Beck 2004
- Maurice Behringer 1954, 1955
- Owen Beldham 1973, 1974, 1975, 1976
- George Bell 1971, 1972, 1975
- Peter Bennett 1971
- Vic Bennetts 1963, 1964, 1965, 1966
- Wayne Berry 2004
- Harry Berwick 1949, 1950, 1951, 1952, 1953, 1955, 1956, 1957, 1958, 1959, 1960, 1961, 1963, 1965, 1967, 1968, 1969, 1973
- Reg Bettington 1926, 1928, 1931, 1932, 1934
- Rudi Bezuidenhout 2005, 2006, 2007
- Phil Billings 1957, 1958, 1959, 1960, 1961, 1962, 1963, 1964, 1965, 1967, 1968, 1969, 1970, 1971, 1972, 1974, 1982
- Colin Bishop 1976, 1977
- Paul Blake 2008, 2009
- Rohan Blizard 2005, 2006, 2007, 2008
- Arthur Bosch 1976, 1977, 1978, 1979, 1980, 1982
- Bruce Boyle 1975
- Clive Boyce 1921
- Ian Bradley 1994, 1995
- Stuart Bradshaw 1947
- Dale Brandt-Richards 2013, 2014, 2015
- David Bransdon 1993, 1994
- Daniel Bringolf 2010, 2011, 2012
- Dave Bromley 1974, 1982
- Arthur N. Brown 1927
- John Brown 1926
- Mitchell Brown 2003, 2004, 2005
- Robert Lee Brown 1928, 1933
- Vic Bulgin 1959, 1960, 1961, 1962, 1965, 1966, 1967
- Barry Burgess 1967, 1968, 1969
- Chris Campbell 1999, 2000, 2001, 2002
- Neptune Christoe 1905, 1906, 1907, 1908, 1909, 1912
- Ben Clementson 2012
- Dal Cockerill 1951
- Lou Cohen 1938
- Robert Colquhoun 1907
- James Conran 2019
- Steven Conran 1988, 1990
- Bruce Cook 1973
- Alan Cooper 1927
- Eric Couper 1974, 1975, 1976, 1978, 1980, 1981, 1982, 1983
- Gordon Craig 1904
- Bruce Crampton 1953
- Tony Crow 1964, 1965
- Harrison Crowe 2018, 2019
- Glen Cunneen 1954, 1955
- John Curtis 1952
- Roger Dannock 1987, 1988, 1989
- Doug Davies 1937, 1939, 1946
- Cameron Davis 2013, 2014, 2015, 2016
- Bruce Devlin 1957, 1958, 1959, 1960
- Warwick Dews 2000, 2001, 2002
- Dick Dickson 1936
- Tony Dight 1983, 1984
- Bill Dobson 1931, 1933, 1934
- Kevin Donohoe 1960, 1961, 1962, 1963, 1964, 1967, 1968, 1969, 1970, 1971
- Adam Downton 2009
- Brett Drewitt 2010, 2011, 2012, 2013
- David Ecob 1986, 1987, 1988
- Matthew Ecob 1989, 1990, 1991, 1992, 1993
- Sam Egger 1993, 1997
- Rob Elkington 1988, 1989, 1991, 1992, 1993, 1994
- Brendan Ellam 1998, 1999, 2000
- Kep Enderby 1946, 1947, 1948, 1949
- Harrison Endycott 2015, 2016, 2017
- Don Esplin 1939
- Geoff Everett 1971, 1972
- George Fawcett 1930, 1931, 1933
- Ben Ferguson 1995, 1996
- Jim Ferrier 1931, 1933, 1934, 1935, 1936, 1937, 1939
- Nick Flanagan 2003
- Jarrod Freeman 2014
- Simon Furneaux 2003
- Joshua Gadd 2018
- Daniel Gale 2016
- Richie Gallichan 2004, 2005, 2006, 2007
- Scott Gardiner 1998, 1999
- Jordie Garner 2018, 2019
- Martin Geraghty 1979
- Howard Giblin 1912
- Matt Giles 2008
- AO Gilles 1906
- Ross Gore 1923
- Paul Gow 1989, 1990, 1991, 1992, 1993
- Jim Grant 1950, 1951
- Kyle Grant 2009, 2011
- Nathan Green 1995, 1996, 1997, 1998
- Tony Gresham 1963, 1964, 1966, 1967, 1968, 1969, 1970, 1971, 1973, 1974, 1975, 1976, 1977, 1978, 1979, 1980, 1981, 1982
- Joshua Grierson 2017, 2018
- Henry Gritton 1923, 1924
- Adam Groom 2000, 2001, 2002
- Ron Hall 1972
- Harry Hattersley 1929, 1930, 1931, 1932, 1933, 1935, 1936, 1937, 1946, 1947, 1948, 1949, 1950, 1951, 1952, 1953, 1954, 1955, 1957
- Peter Headlam 1937, 1938
- Peter Headland 1972, 1973, 1974, 1975
- Peter Heard 1946, 1947, 1948, 1949, 1950, 1951, 1952, 1953, 1955, 1956, 1957, 1958, 1959
- Jake Higginbottom 2010, 2011, 2012
- Lucas Higgins 2019
- George Holdship 1904, 1907
- Mark Holland 1990, 1991, 1992
- Ian Hood 1978, 1979, 1980, 1981, 1982
- Colin Houghton 1977
- Tom Howard 1920, 1921
- Frank Hughes 1934
- Luke Humphries 2009, 2011
- Brendan Jones 1993, 1994, 1995, 1996, 1997, 1998
- Philip Sydney Jones Jr. 1909, 1921, 1924, 1927, 1929
- Philip Sydney Jones III 1929
- Shannon Jones 2000, 2001, 2002
- Ricky Kato 2012, 2013, 2014
- Colin Kaye 1972, 1973, 1974, 1975, 1976, 1977, 1978, 1979, 1980, 1981, 1982, 1983
- Stan Keane 1928, 1930
- Jason King 1998, 1999, 2000, 2001
- William Laidley 1911, 1912
- Tristan Lambert 2005, 2006
- Peter Langham 1954, 1956, 1958, 1959, 1960, 1961, 1962, 1964
- Richard Lee 1977
- Won Jon Lee 2004, 2005, 2006
- Brad Lincoln 1985, 1986, 1993
- Kurt Linde 1996, 1997, 1998
- Col Lindsay 1979, 1981
- Chris Longley 1978, 1981, 1983, 1984, 1987, 1988
- Bryce MacDonald 1994, 1995, 1996, 1997
- Hugh MacNeil 1904, 1905, 1908
- Edward Bayly Macarthur 1904, 1905, 1909
- Charles Mackenzie 1906, 1907, 1908, 1911
- Lance Mason 1970
- Jack McCarthy 1953, 1956, 1957
- Henry McClelland 1920, 1922, 1924, 1925
- Rhys McGovern 2010
- Frank McGuinness 1929
- Scott McGuinness 2003
- Jack McIntosh 1936
- Tom McKay 1932, 1934, 1935, 1937
- Andrew McKenzie 2003, 2004
- Ossie Meares 1920, 1922
- Travis Merritt 2000
- Stephen Moriarty 1994
- Hector Morrison 1925, 1926, 1928, 1929, 1930, 1931, 1932, 1933, 1938
- Troy Moses 2013, 2014, 2015
- Frank Murdoch 1923, 1925, 1926
- Bruce Nairn 1962
- Mark Nash 1984, 1985
- Jack Newton 1968, 1969
- James Nitties 2002, 2003, 2004
- Isaac Noh 2017
- Oscar O'Brien 1905, 1906, 1907, 1908, 1909, 1911, 1912
- Brett Ogle 1984, 1985
- Peter O'Malley 1985, 1986
- Callan O'Reilly 2012, 2013
- Albert Padfield 1909
- Dimitrios Papadatos 2011, 2012
- Lucas Parsons 1989, 1990, 1991, 1992
- Lee Patterson 1956
- Robert Payne 2001
- Clyde Pearce 1908
- Jim Pendergast 1946, 1947, 1948
- Dylan Perry 2016, 2017
- Brayden Petersen 2014, 2015
- Lester Peterson 1984, 1985, 1986, 1987, 1988, 1989, 1990, 1991, 1992, 1993, 1994, 1995, 1996, 1997, 1998, 1999, 2005
- Ray Picker 1984, 1985, 1986
- Jye Pickin 2019
- Keith Pix 1951, 1952, 1953, 1954, 1955, 1958
- Edward Pope 1921
- Ewan Porter 2001
- John Powell 1953, 1955
- Gerry Power 1980, 1981, 1982, 1983, 1984, 1985, 1986, 1987
- George Proud 1932
- Michael Raseta 2008, 2009, 2010
- Barry Ratcliffe 1954
- Noel Ratcliffe 1970, 1971, 1973
- Claude Reading 1909, 1911, 1922
- Andrew Richards 2018
- Ted Rigney 1946, 1956
- John Rixon 1987
- Justin Roach 2006, 2007
- Charles Rundle 1911, 1920, 1922, 1923, 1926, 1930, 1932, 1935, 1936
- Grant Scott 2007, 2008
- JRD Scott 1924
- Don Sharp 1966, 1968, 1969
- Paul Sheehan 1996, 1997, 1998, 1999
- Ted Simpson 1904, 1905, 1906, 1907, 1908
- Harry Sinclair 1922, 1923, 1924, 1925
- Rory Slade 1978, 1979, 1983
- Brendan Smith 2008, 2009
- Clive Nigel Smith 1924, 1926, 1927, 1929, 1930, 1935, 1936
- Matthew Smith 1999
- Thomas Smith 1912
- Michael Smyth 2009, 2010
- Travis Smyth 2014, 2015, 2016, 2017
- Ruben Sondjaja 2013
- Dan Soutar 1904
- Arthur Spooner 1938
- Edward Stedman 1999
- Henry Stephen 1924
- Tim Stewart 2006, 2007, 2008
- Wayne Stewart 1987, 1988, 1989, 1990, 1991, 1992
- Matt Stieger 2010, 2011
- Les Stuart 1939
- Walter Sturrock 1920, 1922, 1928
- Brad Sullivan 1983
- Richard Swift 2000, 2001, 2002
- Tom Tanner 1938, 1939, 1948, 1949
- Gordon Thomson 1937, 1950, 1952, 1953
- Mark Thomson 2004
- Lincoln Tighe 2009, 2010, 2011
- Bill Tobin 1966, 1967
- DM Tooth 1927
- Des Turner 1961, 1962, 1965, 1966, 1967, 1968, 1969, 1970
- Danny Vera 1994
- Noel Wade 1959, 1961, 1963
- Jeff Wagner 1983, 1986
- Bob Wallace 1970
- LG Warren 1927
- Barry Warren 1954, 1956, 1957, 1958, 1959, 1960
- Craig Warren 1984, 1985, 1986
- Justin Warren 2015
- Alan Waterson 1934, 1937, 1939, 1946, 1947, 1948, 1951
- PC Watson 1936
- Norman Weeks 1949, 1950, 1952, 1953
- Charles White 1904
- Rob Whitlock 1991, 1992
- Richmond Whytt 1904, 1905
- Rob Willis 1988, 1989, 1990
- Blake Windred 2016, 2017, 2018, 2019
- Doug Witham 1976, 1977
- Bob Withycombe 1934, 1938
- Phil Wood 1970, 1972, 1973, 1974, 1975, 1976, 1977, 1978, 1979, 1980
- Trevor Wood 1971
- Graydon Woolridge 1995
- William Wright 1962, 1963
- Kevin Yuan 2015, 2016, 2017
- Jordan Zunic 2012, 2013, 2014

=== Northern Territory ===
Northern Territory first competed in 2015.

- Alex Brennan 2017, 2018, 2019
- Daniel Brown 2015
- John Croker 2018
- Jaryd Grant 2017
- Mitchell Gridley 2015, 2016, 2017
- Peter Hargreaves 2015, 2019
- Thomas Harold 2018
- Kerryn Heaver 2015, 2016, 2017, 2018, 2019
- William Hetherington 2015
- Jake Hughes 2015, 2016, 2017, 2018, 2019
- Robert Miller 2016, 2017, 2018
- Lachlan Morgan 2019
- Malcolm Roney 2018, 2019
- Terence Serventy 2017, 2018
- Leigh Shacklady 2015, 2016, 2019
- Brad Stankiewicz 2016
- Mark Steven 2015
- Benjamin Steven 2019
- Rex Williamson 2016
- George Worrall 2016, 2017

=== Queensland ===
Queensland first competed in 1925 and played again in 1928, 1931, 1936, 1937 and 1938. They played in all events from 1946.

- D Anderson 1996
- Eric Anning 1925, 1928
- Maverick Antcliff 2011
- Tom Arnott 1999, 2000
- Richard Backwell 1984, 1985
- Viraat Badhwar 2013
- Matt Ballard 1999, 2000, 2001
- D Barnes 1989, 1990
- J Barton 1970, 1972, 1973
- Marika Batibasaga 2007, 2010
- Ray Beaufils 2005, 2006, 2007, 2008
- Rowan Beste 2003
- Kunal Bhasin 2006
- Ben Bloomfield 2003, 2004
- Adam Blyth 2003, 2004
- Stuart Bouvier 1987, 1988, 1989
- Steven Bowditch 2000, 2001
- Clive Boyce 1925, 1928, 1931
- William Boyce 1925, 1928, 1931
- Adam Boyer 2009, 2010
- J Brook 1925, 1928
- Robbie Brook 1992, 1993, 1994, 1995
- L Brown 1975
- Stuart Brown 1993, 1994, 1995, 1996, 1997, 1998
- Andrew Buckle 2001, 2002
- Richard Buczynsky 1991, 1992, 1993, 1994
- Marcus Cain 1994
- Kurt Carlson 2005
- A Carrick 1959
- Keith Cashman 1965, 1966
- Glen Cogill 1972, 1974, 1975, 1976, 1977, 1978, 1979, 1980, 1981, 1982, 1983, 1984
- Lochie Coleborn 2019
- Alex Colledge 1936, 1937, 1938, 1946, 1947, 1948, 1949, 1952, 1953, 1955, 1956, 1957, 1958
- Jared Consoli 2009
- Dick Coogan 1946, 1948, 1949, 1952, 1953, 1954, 1955, 1960, 1961, 1964, 1966, 1967, 1968, 1969
- Jack Coogan 1946, 1948, 1949, 1951, 1952, 1953, 1955, 1959, 1960
- Steven Cox 2016
- Christopher Crabtree 2017, 2019
- Doug Cranstoun 1958, 1960
- Cory Crawford 2014, 2015
- Robert Cumming 1928, 1931
- Peter Dagan 1983, 1984
- Charlie Dann 2016, 2017, 2018
- Brett Davies 1992
- Peter Davies 1952, 1953, 1954, 1955, 1957, 1958, 1959, 1960, 1961, 1962, 1963, 1964, 1965, 1966, 1968, 1969
- Ian Davis 1974, 1975, 1976
- Tom Davis 2002, 2003, 2004, 2005
- Jason Day 2004, 2005
- Louis Dobbelaar 2017, 2018, 2019
- Andrew Dodt 2003, 2004, 2005, 2006, 2007
- Paul Donahoo 2005, 2006
- Chris Downes 1999, 2000
- Keith Drage 1948, 1954, 1956, 1957, 1958, 1959, 1960, 1962, 1963, 1964, 1965, 1966, 1967, 1968, 1969, 1970, 1971, 1972
- Andrew Duffin 2001, 2002
- Roley Duncan 1946, 1947
- Lee Eagleton 1991, 1992, 1993, 1994, 1995
- Alan Eaves 1975, 1981, 1982
- John Ebenston 1970, 1971, 1972, 1973, 1974, 1975, 1976
- Henry Epstein 2000
- Colin Esdaile 1931
- Gavin Fairfax 2008, 2009, 2010
- Don Fardon Sr 1983
- Don Fardon Jr 1983
- Don Fardon (Note: Both father and son played in 1983 but in other years it is not clear which one played.) 1982, 1984, 1986, 1987, 1988, 1989, 1990
- Edward Fitzpatrick 1928
- Gavin Flint 2002, 2003, 2004
- Lawry Flynn 2017, 2018, 2019
- Paul Foley 1976
- Stan Francis 1928, 1937
- Chris Fraser 1985
- Doug Gardner 1988, 1989, 1990, 1991, 1992, 1993, 1994
- Dylan Gardner 2018, 2019
- Adam Gemmell 2007, 2010
- James Gibellini 2011, 2012, 2013
- Budge Gill 1936, 1947, 1950
- Len Gillander 1954
- David Gleeson 1995, 1996, 1997, 1998
- Theo Godsell 1949
- Wayne Grady 1977
- David Grenfell 1995
- Matthew Guyatt 1996, 1997, 1998, 1999
- Peter Hall 2008
- Ryan Haller 1998, 1999
- Ian Handley 1954, 1955, 1956, 1957
- Peter Harrington 1991
- Chris Harrop 2012
- Tim Hart 2008, 2009, 2010, 2011
- John Hay 1965, 1966, 1967, 1968, 1969, 1970, 1971, 1978, 1979
- Claude Henry 1936
- Doug Hertrick 1964
- Ron Hertrick 1966, 1967, 1968, 1969, 1970, 1971, 1972, 1973, 1974
- Lucas Higgins 2017
- Lewis Hoath 2019
- David Hoger 1973, 1975
- L Holmes 1983
- Ray Howarth 1938, 1948, 1949, 1950, 1951, 1952, 1953, 1954, 1956
- Harry Howes 1947
- Thomas Brown Hunter 1931
- Paul Jackman 1961, 1962, 1963, 1964, 1965
- D Jenkins 1977, 1978, 1983
- Ross Jenkinson 1936, 1937, 1938
- Travis Johns 1997, 1998
- Garth Johnstone 1962, 1963, 1964
- Chris Jones 1991, 1992, 1993, 1994
- L Jones 1925
- C Joyce 1987, 1988
- G Joyce 1936
- Jody Kaggelis 1996
- Stan Keane 1937, 1946, 1948
- Troy Kennedy 2000
- Joe Kiernan 1970
- Matthew King 1985, 1986, 1987, 1988, 1989
- Douglas Klein 2016, 2017, 2018
- Kelvin Kroh 1985
- Bronson La'Cassie 2002
- Col Lindsay 1982, 1984
- J Lynch 1993
- Taylor MacDonald 2011, 2012, 2013, 2014, 2015
- Sommie Mackay 1957, 1958, 1959, 1960, 1961, 1963, 1964, 1965, 1966, 1967, 1968, 1969, 1970
- T MacLean 1980
- Justin Maker 2003, 2004, 2005, 2006
- L Maker 1959
- Kevin Marques 2011, 2012, 2013
- Matthew McBain 2007, 2008
- Kade McBride 2014
- Daniel McGraw 2012
- Blake McGrory 2007, 2009, 2010
- Jake McLeod 2013, 2014, 2015
- John Miller 1938
- Richard Moir 1999, 2000, 2001, 2002, 2003
- C Moore 1925
- Ossie Moore 1977, 1978, 1979, 1981, 1982
- Derrin Morgan 1995, 1996, 1997, 1998, 1999
- Jediah Morgan 2017, 2018, 2019
- Alan Morrow 1938
- B Munn 1958
- Mark Nash 1979, 1980, 1981
- Simon Nash 2000
- Daniel Nisbet 2007, 2008, 2009, 2011, 2012
- Greg Norman 1973, 1974
- Bernie O'Sullivan 1950, 1951, 1952, 1953
- Jon O'Sullivan 2001, 2002
- Harry Oberg 1947
- M Officer 1984
- Dylan Perry 2018
- Wayne Perske 1997, 1998, 1999
- Aaron Pike 2006
- Charles Pilon 2016
- Ben Pisani 2004, 2005
- David Podlich 1989, 1990
- Trevor Poetschka 1986
- Barney Porter 1956, 1957, 1958, 1960, 1961, 1962, 1963, 1964, 1967, 1968, 1971
- T Power 1982
- Blake Proverbs 2015, 2016
- Anthony Quayle 2014, 2015, 2016
- Jack Radcliffe 1925, 1936
- Brett Rankin 2006, 2007, 2008, 2009, 2010
- Jack Rayner 1951, 1954, 1955, 1956, 1957, 1961, 1966
- D Richards 1992
- J Riley 1997, 1998
- M Roberts 1988, 1989, 1990
- J Rogers 1993
- Greg Rowe 1985, 1986
- Mark Sanford 1984
- Alf Scanlan 1950
- V Scott 1971
- Jeff Senior 1976, 1977, 1978, 1979, 1980, 1981, 1982
- Peter Senior 1976, 1977, 1978
- Derek Shirlaw 1990, 1991
- Cameron Smith 2010, 2011, 2012, 2013
- Mitchell Smith 2016
- Scott Smith 2008
- Phil Soegaard 1991
- Bill Somers 1949
- Danny Spencer 1974, 1975, 1976, 1977, 1978, 1979, 1980, 1981
- Joel Stahlhut 2019
- Bill Stanley 1938, 1946, 1950, 1956
- Jack Sullivan 2014, 2015
- W Sullivan 1931
- Shane Tait 1987, 1990
- Stephen Taylor 1985, 1986, 1987
- Steve Thompson 2009
- Mark Tickle 1980, 1981, 1983, 1986, 1987
- Graham Tippett 1962, 1967, 1969, 1970, 1972, 1973, 1979, 1980
- Drew Tovey 1971
- Geoff Townson 1947, 1949, 1950, 1951
- Ian Triggs 1972
- Gerry Trude 1937
- George Twemlow 1936, 1937
- Nathan Uebergang 2006
- Randall Vines 1961, 1962
- Simon Viitakangas 2013, 2014, 2015
- Dudley von Nida 1937, 1938, 1946, 1950, 1959
- Ian Walker 2001, 2002
- Peter Wardrop 1971, 1972, 1973, 1974, 1975, 1976, 1977, 1978, 1979, 1980
- Mick Weston 1955, 1963
- Noel Weston 1947, 1948, 1949, 1951, 1952, 1953, 1954, 1955, 1956, 1957, 1959, 1960, 1961, 1963, 1969
- R Weston 1965
- George Whatmore 1931
- Roy White 1947, 1948, 1950, 1951, 1952, 1953
- Shaun Wiggett 1993, 1994, 1995, 1996
- Aaron Wilkin 2012, 2013, 2014
- Alan Wilson 1981
- Bill Wishart 1951, 1958, 1965
- Chris Witcher 1973, 1974
- Chris Wood 2010, 2011
- Kyle Woodbine 1995, 1996, 1997
- Shae Wools-Cobb 2015, 2016, 2017, 2018
- Gary Wright 1967
- T Wright 1991, 1992
- Mark Wuersching 2001
- Peter Wuoti 1982, 1983, 1984, 1985
- Peter Zidar 1986, 1987, 1988, 1989, 1990
- Zoran Zorkic 1985, 1986, 1988

=== South Australia ===
- Bill Ackland-Horman 1932, 1935, 1937, 1938, 1939, 1947, 1948, 1949, 1950, 1951, 1952, 1953, 1954, 1955, 1956, 1957, 1958, 1959, 1962
- William Ackland-Horman Sr. 1921
- Luke Altschwager 1997, 1998
- Max Anderson 1907
- Colin Angel 1968, 1969, 1970, 1971
- George Anstey 1905, 1907
- Leigh Attenborough 1996, 1998
- Chris Austin 2005, 2006, 2007, 2008, 2009, 2010, 2011, 2013
- Julian Ayers 1905
- John Baker 1910, 1912, 1913
- Timothy Baker 2012, 2013
- Lachlan Barker 2015, 2016, 2017
- Earn Barritt 1909, 1910, 1913
- Kevin Bartsch 1975
- Shane Baxter 2003, 2004, 2005
- Hugh Bell 1912, 1913
- Hugh Bell 1970, 1972, 1973
- Ben Bert 1996, 1997, 1998, 1999, 2000, 2001, 2002
- Adam Bland 2002, 2003, 2004
- Greg Blewett 2012
- Tom Bond 2009, 2010, 2011, 2012
- Chris Bonython 1971, 1972, 1973, 1974, 1975, 1976, 1977, 1978
- Geoff Brennan 1999
- Wayne Bridgman 1970
- Chris Brown 2007, 2008, 2009, 2010, 2011, 2012, 2013
- E Bruce 1913
- Jack Buchanan 2018, 2019
- Kevin Bulbeck 1982, 1983, 1984
- G Burns 1994
- Samuel Burton 2017
- Darrell Cahill 1967, 1968, 1969, 1989
- Billy Cawthorne 2017, 2018, 2019
- Brendan Chant 1995, 1996, 1997, 1998
- Phillip Chapman 1990, 1991, 1992, 1993, 1994, 1995, 1996
- Tom Cheadle 1908, 1923, 1926, 1929, 1932
- David Cherry 1966, 1967, 1968, 1969, 1971, 1973, 1974, 1975, 1976, 1977, 1978, 1979, 1980, 1981, 1982, 1983, 1987
- Bob Christie 1936, 1937, 1938, 1939, 1947, 1949
- Sam Christie 1975, 1976, 1979
- Dave Cleland 1950, 1951, 1957, 1958, 1959, 1960, 1961, 1962, 1963, 1966, 1967
- Jamie Clutterham 2000, 2001
- Colin Coleman 2018
- Peter Cooke 2002, 2003, 2004, 2005, 2006, 2007
- Justin Cooper 1992, 1993, 1994, 1995
- James Coulson 1987, 1988, 1989, 1992, 1993, 1994
- William Cowell 1909, 1910
- Neil Crafter 1980, 1981, 1982, 1983, 1984, 1985, 1986, 1987, 1988, 1989, 1990, 1991, 1992
- Roy Crook 1935, 1937, 1939
- Brett Crosby 1991, 1993, 1994, 1995, 1996, 1997, 1998
- Justin Crowder 2014
- Nick Cullen 2006, 2007, 2008
- Max Dale 1959, 1962, 1968, 1970
- W Davies 1908
- Craig Davis 2003
- Dick Destree 1948, 1949, 1950, 1951, 1952, 1954, 1955
- Gordon Dick 1967
- James Dudley 2001
- Bob Duval 1953, 1954, 1958, 1959, 1960, 1965, 1968
- Alan Dye 1929
- Sam Earl 2015, 2016
- Brian Ferris 1954, 1956, 1961, 1962
- Rod Follett 1971
- Dick Foot 1950, 1951, 1953, 1954, 1955, 1957, 1958, 1959, 1960, 1961
- Bob Forbes 1921, 1923, 1926, 1927
- Louis Fuller 2004, 2005, 2006
- CL Gardiner 1907
- Liam Georgiadis 2016, 2018, 2019
- Digby Giles 1923, 1924, 1930
- Tony Gover 1972
- Andrew Grzybowski 2009
- Bill Gunson 1905, 1907, 1908, 1910, 1912, 1924
- Bill Guy 1983, 1984, 1985, 1990, 1991
- Ben Hallam 2004, 2007
- Herbert Hambleton 1924
- Robert Hammer 2000, 2001
- Deane Harris 1982, 1983, 1984, 1986
- Michael Harris 1999
- SD Harris 1946
- Mike Haslett 1981, 1982, 1983, 1984, 1985, 1986, 1994
- D Hatwell 1966
- Les Haupt 1957
- RJ Hawkes 1909
- Joshua Hayes 2015, 2018
- Ian Hayward 1927, 1930
- Kari Heikkonen 1979, 1980, 1981, 1982
- Ian Henderson 1984, 1985, 1986, 1987, 1988
- Alex Hendrick 2008, 2010, 2011
- Joseph Hodgson 2017
- Peter Howard 1964, 1965, 1966, 1968, 1969, 1970, 1971, 1972, 1973, 1974, 1975, 1976, 1977, 1978, 1981
- Ryan Hunter 2000
- Glen Hutton 1936
- Tony Hutton 1962, 1963, 1964, 1965, 1966, 1967, 1968, 1969
- D Jay 1964, 1965
- Glenn Jewell 1999
- Andrew Johnson 1999, 2000, 2001, 2002, 2003, 2004
- Edmund Britten Jones 1924
- Glenn Joyner 1985, 1986, 1987
- Jackson Kalz 2017, 2018
- Graham Keane 1954, 1955, 1956, 1957, 1959, 1967
- W Kelly 1930
- Nathan Kent 2000, 2001, 2002
- Vern Kingshott 1959, 1960, 1961, 1962, 1963, 1965, 1966, 1967
- Stuart Kopania 1999, 2005
- Matt Lane 1996, 1997, 1998
- Ben Layton 2016, 2019
- Edward Leaver 1913, 1921
- Matthew Lisk 2014, 2015, 2016, 2017
- David Lutterus 2002, 2003, 2004, 2005
- JA Macdonald 1910, 1912, 1913
- John Maddern 1959, 1960
- Troy Manhire 2001
- Sam Masters 2011
- Max McCardle 2008, 2009, 2010
- Andrew McCarthy 2006
- Paul McDonald 1995
- J McDowall 1974
- Glen McGough 1997
- Dick McKay 1963, 1964
- Alec McLachlan 1932, 1933, 1935
- Ian McLachlan 1930, 1949
- Campbell McLuckie 1991, 1992, 1993
- Bob Mesnil 1962, 1963, 1964
- Mark Milbank 1980
- Douglas Moody 1933
- Brad Moules 2010, 2011, 2012
- John Muller 1974, 1975, 1976, 1977, 1978, 1979
- Anthony Murdaca 2010, 2011, 2012, 2013, 2014, 2015
- John Myers 1963, 1964, 1965, 1968, 1969
- Andrew Nakone 2017
- Noel Neumann 1952
- S Nichol 1993
- Bryan Nolte 1956
- Harry Nott 1923, 1924, 1926, 1927, 1932, 1933, 1939
- Jordan Ormsby 1996
- Wade Ormsby 1997
- Cyril Ostler 1958, 1960, 1961, 1962, 1963
- Bill Parsons 1923, 1926, 1927
- Leslie Penfold Hyland 1905, 1907, 1908, 1910
- Adrian Percey 1990, 1991, 1992, 1993, 1994, 1995
- Henry Perks 2002, 2003
- Sylv Phelan 1946
- Don Phillis 1946
- R Pope 1987, 1989, 1990
- Scott Ready 2014, 2016
- Peter Reid 1946
- Michael Richards 1976, 1977, 1978
- Andrew Richardson 1995, 1996, 1997, 1998, 1999, 2000, 2001, 2002
- Jack Richardson 1947
- Heath Riches 2012, 2013, 2014, 2015, 2016
- Jacob Rillotta 2019
- Phil Roberts 1979, 1980, 1981, 1982, 1983, 1984, 1985, 1986, 1987, 1988, 1990, 1991, 1992
- Shane Robinson 1985, 1986, 1987, 1988, 1989
- Jarrad Roxby 2005, 2006, 2007, 2011
- Don Rutherford 1952, 1955, 1965, 1966
- Bill Rymill 1929, 1930, 1932, 1933, 1935, 1936, 1937, 1938, 1948, 1949, 1951, 1952, 1953, 1954, 1956
- Herbert Rymill 1905, 1912, 1921
- Ross Sawers 1926, 1927, 1929, 1930, 1932, 1933, 1935, 1936, 1938, 1939
- Alfred Scarfe 1907, 1908, 1909, 1912
- Andreas Schleicher 1988, 1989, 1990
- Peter Scovell 1964, 1965, 1966, 1970
- Gordon Seddon 1939, 1947, 1948, 1950, 1951
- Darryl Sellar 1989, 1990
- Don Sharp 1971
- Charles Shaw 2013
- Bill Shephard 1947, 1948, 1950, 1951, 1953, 1955, 1957, 1958, 1960, 1961, 1962
- Cody Sherratt 2004
- Jordan Sherratt 2005, 2006, 2007, 2008, 2009, 2010
- Gary Simpson 1991, 1992, 1993, 1994
- W Simpson 1971, 1972, 1973
- Stanley Skipper 1924
- Brad Smith 2003
- Jamie Smith 2019
- Walter Law Smith 1912, 1913, 1921
- William Somerfield 2014, 2015, 2016, 2017
- Paul Spargo 1999
- Daniel Speirs 2009
- Stephen Speirs 2006, 2007, 2008, 2009
- Nigel Spence 2000
- Rex Spong 1937
- Mike Sprengel 1985, 1986
- Bob Stevens 1946, 1947, 1948, 1949, 1950, 1951, 1952, 1953, 1955, 1956, 1958, 1960, 1961, 1962, 1963
- Graham Stevens 1972, 1973, 1974, 1978, 1979, 1980, 1981, 1988, 1989
- Robert Still 1964, 1967
- Guy Stirling 1909, 1910
- Benjamin Stowe 2013, 2014
- Brian Swift 1921, 1923, 1924
- Harry Swift 1905, 1908, 1909
- Jack Tanner 2019
- Jack Thompson 2018, 2019
- L Thompson 1973, 1974
- Harry Thredgold 1935, 1938, 1951, 1953
- David Threlfall 1972, 1973, 1974, 1977, 1978, 1979
- Lindsay Toms 1927, 1929
- Alf Toogood 1926
- Rupert Tucker 1929
- Ben Tuohy 1995, 1998
- Bob Tuohy 1956, 1957, 1958
- Dudley Turner 1933, 1936, 1937
- Frank Vucic 2018
- Mel Warner 1956
- Chris Whitford 1969, 1970, 1975, 1976, 1977, 1978, 1979, 1980, 1988, 2002
- Adrian Wickstein 2008
- Dean Wiles 1969, 1970, 1971, 1972, 1975, 1976, 1977, 1980, 1981, 1982, 1983, 1984
- John Wilkin 1948, 1949, 1950, 1952, 1953, 1954, 1955, 1957
- Jack Williams 2012, 2013, 2014, 2015
- Legh Winser 1921, 1923, 1926, 1927, 1929, 1930, 1932, 1933, 1936, 1938, 1946
- Harold Wright 1935, 1936, 1937, 1938, 1939, 1946, 1947, 1948, 1949

=== Tasmania ===
Tasmania first entered in 1907 and competed a number of times up to 1930, generally when it was held in Melbourne. After 1930 they didn't enter a team again until 1947.

- David Allanby 1996, 1997, 1998, 1999, 2000, 2001, 2002, 2003
- J Allen 1959, 1962
- Henry Allport 1925
- Thomas Archer Jr. 1909, 1912, 1924
- Thomas Archer Sr. 1907, 1909
- Raynor Arthur 1912
- Reg Ashbarry 1947, 1948, 1949, 1950, 1951, 1952, 1955, 1956
- Tony Bailey 1983
- Rex Barnes 1959, 1960, 1961
- Lance Baynton 1950, 1953
- Paul Beard 1977, 1978, 1979, 1980, 1981, 1982
- Cameron Bell 2014, 2015
- Allan Birchmore 1963
- Roy Bishop 1950
- Matthew Blackburn 1988, 1989, 1995, 1996
- Bradley Bone 1994, 1995, 1996, 1997, 1998, 1999, 2000
- Andrew Bonsey 2000
- Elliott Booth 1962, 1963, 1964, 1965, 1966, 1968, 1970, 1972, 1973, 1974, 1975, 1976, 1977, 1978, 1979, 1980, 1981, 1982, 1983, 1984, 1985, 1986, 1987, 1988, 1989, 1990, 1991, 1992
- Lionel Bowditch 1947, 1948, 1949, 1950, 1951, 1952, 1953, 1954, 1955, 1956, 1957, 1958
- Joey Bower 2019
- Kevin Brain 1984, 1986
- Peter Brown 1930, 1947, 1948, 1949, 1950, 1951, 1952, 1953, 1954, 1955, 1956, 1957
- Terence Brown 1928, 1930
- R Bull 1925
- Don Cameron 1960, 1961, 1963, 1964, 1965, 1966, 1967, 1969, 1970, 1971, 1972, 1974, 1975, 1976, 1977, 1978, 1979, 1980, 1981, 1982, 1983, 1984, 1985, 1986, 1987, 1988
- Jack Carswell 2007
- Phil Cartledge 1954
- John Cassidy 1999, 2000, 2001, 2002, 2003, 2004, 2005, 2006, 2007, 2008, 2009, 2010, 2011, 2012, 2013
- Craig Christie 1999
- David Constable 1925, 1930
- Michael Craw 1982
- Cory Crawford 2011, 2012
- Leonard Cuff 1907, 1909, 1912, 1921
- Ellis Davies 1928
- Tim D'Emden 1980, 1981, 1982
- Aaron Dobson 2014
- George Fawcett 1912
- Tom Field 1928
- Shane French 1988, 1989, 1990
- J Gardiner 1961
- Nathan Gatehouse 2010, 2011, 2012, 2013, 2014, 2015, 2016, 2017, 2018
- Phillip Glass 1981, 1988
- Mathew Goggin 1993, 1994, 1995
- David Good 1966, 1967, 1968, 1969
- Duncan Grant 1963, 1964, 1965, 1966, 1967, 1968, 1969, 1970, 1974
- Herbert Grant 1925
- Stuart Gray 2002, 2003
- Ian Grimsey 1965, 1971, 1972
- Don Halliwell 1963, 1964
- Alex Hamilton 2011
- Craig Hancock 2003, 2004, 2005, 2006, 2007, 2008, 2009, 2017, 2018, 2019
- Garry Harper 1980
- Sean Harris 2004, 2005, 2006
- Eustace Headlam 1912, 1924
- Felix Headlam 1924, 1925, 1928, 1930
- Anthony Heazlewood 2001
- Andrew Hill 1978, 1981, 1982, 1983, 1984, 1985, 1987, 1990, 1991, 1992, 1993, 1994
- Robin Hodgetts 1995, 1996, 1997, 1999, 2001, 2002, 2003, 2004
- Jonathan Isles 1993, 1994, 1995, 1996, 1997, 1998, 1999, 2000, 2001, 2002
- Brett Johns 1981, 1982, 1983, 1984, 1985, 1986, 1987, 1988, 1990, 1991, 1992, 1993
- M Johns 1984
- William Johnstone 1907
- Dudley Jones 1953
- Andrew Kamaric 2004, 2005, 2006
- Mervyn Kay 1970, 1971, 1976, 1977
- Richard Kube 2010, 2013, 2017, 2018
- Michael Leedham 1974, 1975, 1976, 1979, 1983, 1984, 1985, 1986, 1987, 1988, 1989, 1990, 1991, 1992, 1993, 1994
- Norman Lockhart 1924
- Errol Lohrey 1989, 1990, 1991, 1992, 1993, 1994, 1995, 1996, 1997
- Greg Longmore 2008, 2009, 2013, 2015, 2016, 2019
- Steven Lucas 1991, 1992
- Ken Maroney 1949, 1950, 1951, 1952, 1953, 1954
- Paul Marshall 1992, 1994, 1995, 1996, 1998, 2007, 2008
- Steven Mathew 2005
- Noel Matthews 1947, 1948, 1949
- P Matthews 1972, 1973
- Harry May 1960, 1961
- Andrew McCarthy 2003, 2004, 2005, 2013, 2014
- Ryan McCarthy 2007, 2008, 2009, 2010, 2011, 2012
- Bruce McClure 1964, 1965, 1966, 1967
- W McPherson 1965
- Josh Molendyk 2015
- Dennis Mulcahy 1958, 1962
- John Munnings 1956
- Len Nettlefold 1921, 1924, 1925, 1928, 1930, 1947, 1948, 1949
- Robert Nettlefold 1921, 1924, 1925, 1928, 1930
- Arthur O'Connor 1907
- Roy O'Connor 1907, 1909
- Warwick Page 2000, 2001
- Brett Partridge 1991, 1992, 1993, 1994, 1995, 1996
- Rupert Paton 1921, 1930
- Bruce Pearce 1909, 1912
- Clyde Pearce 1907, 1909
- Duane Penney 1997, 1998
- Andrew Phillips 1998, 1999, 2000, 2010, 2011, 2012, 2013, 2014, 2015, 2016, 2017, 2018, 2019
- Gerald Potter 1921, 1924
- David Pretyman 1989, 1990
- Gary Purdon 1975
- James Pyke 2003, 2004, 2005, 2006, 2007, 2009
- James Ramsay 2002
- John Ramsay 1921
- Sam Rawlings 2012, 2013, 2014, 2015, 2016
- Paul Read 2016, 2017, 2018, 2019
- Jason Reynolds 2006
- Clint Rice 2001, 2002
- Kalem Richardson 2008, 2009, 2010
- Jonathan Ricks 1997
- Adam Ring 2006, 2007, 2008, 2009, 2010
- Max Robison 1970, 1971, 1972, 1973, 1974, 1975, 1976, 1977, 1978, 1979, 1980, 1983
- Matthew Rose 2011, 2012
- Bruce Saunders 1952, 1953, 1955
- Mark Schulze 2004, 2005, 2006, 2007, 2008, 2009, 2010, 2011, 2012, 2013, 2014, 2015, 2016, 2017, 2018, 2019
- Athol Shephard 1957, 1958, 1959, 1960, 1962, 1965, 1966
- John Shield 1957, 1958
- Gary Smith 1987, 1988
- Hugh Smith 1921, 1928
- Elijah Stanley 2017
- Colin Stott 1972, 1973, 1974, 1975, 1976, 1977
- Roy Stott 1951, 1952, 1953, 1954, 1955, 1956, 1957, 1958, 1959, 1961, 1962, 1963, 1968, 1969
- M Sullivan 1989
- Ryan Thomas 2018, 2019
- Reginald Thorold 1912
- Doug Thorp 1967, 1968, 1969, 1970, 1971, 1972, 1973, 1975, 1978, 1979, 1980, 1985, 1986
- Laurie Thyne 1947
- Anthony Toogood 1997, 1998
- John Toogood 1951, 1952, 1953, 1954, 1955, 1956, 1957, 1958, 1959, 1960, 1961, 1962, 1963, 1964, 1967, 1968, 1969, 1971
- Peter Toogood 1948, 1949, 1950, 1951, 1952, 1954, 1955, 1956, 1957, 1958, 1959, 1960, 1962, 1964, 1966, 1967, 1968, 1969, 1970, 1971, 1972, 1973, 1974, 1976, 1977, 1978, 1979, 1980
- Jack Tregaskisjago 2014, 2016
- Des Turner 1957, 1958, 1959, 1960
- Mitch Van Noord 2015, 2016, 2017, 2018, 2019
- Jason Wagner 1998, 1999, 2000, 2001, 2002, 2003
- Phillip Watson 1985, 1986, 1987
- Mike Wellington 1961, 1962, 1963
- Bill Wellington 1964, 1965, 1966, 1967, 1968, 1969, 1970, 1971, 1973, 1974, 1975, 1976, 1977, 1978, 1979, 1981, 1982, 1983, 1984, 1985, 1986, 1987
- Neil Wells 1973
- Peter Westfield 1989, 1990
- John Willing 1947, 1948, 1949, 1950, 1951, 1954
- David Willis 1991, 1993
- Ron Winnett 1959, 1960

=== Victoria ===
- Jon Abbott 2003, 2005
- Barton Adams 1925, 1934
- Greg Alexander 1979
- Stephen Allan 1993, 1994, 1995
- Robert Allenby 1989, 1990, 1991
- HB Anderson 1934, 1938
- Stuart Appleby 1991, 1992
- David Armstrong 1991, 1992, 1993
- Doug Bachli 1946, 1947, 1948, 1949, 1950, 1951, 1952, 1953, 1955, 1956, 1957, 1958, 1959, 1960, 1962, 1963, 1964
- Aaron Baddeley 1998, 1999
- William Bailey 1926
- John Baillieu 1938, 1946, 1947
- Glenn Beckett 1998
- Daniel Beckmann 2007, 2008, 2009, 2010
- John Beveridge 1990, 1991, 1992
- Luke Bleumink 2007, 2008, 2009, 2010
- Bill Bosley 1969
- Marcus Both 2000, 2001, 2002
- Rory Bourke 2009, 2010, 2011, 2012
- Ken Boyd 1984
- Clyde Boyer 1975, 1976, 1977, 1978, 1979, 1980, 1982, 1984, 1985
- Paul Bray 1981
- S Brentnall 1910
- Darcy Brereton 2018, 2019
- David Briggs 1984
- Bill Britten 1964, 1965, 1966, 1967, 1968, 1969, 1970, 1971, 1972, 1973, 1974, 1975
- Norman Brookes 1904, 1906, 1908, 1911, 1912, 1913
- Anthony Brown 2001, 2002
- Bob Brown 1946, 1947, 1948
- William Bruce 1905, 1907
- Bob Bull 1952, 1953, 1954, 1956, 1957, 1959
- Fred Bulte 1927, 1928, 1929, 1930, 1933
- Ben Bunny 2002, 2003
- Lachlan Cain 2010, 2011
- Henry Callaway 1904, 1905, 1907, 1908
- Matt Carver 1992
- Rob Castles 1982, 1983, 1984, 1985
- Konrad Ciupek 2019
- Mike Clayton 1976, 1977, 1978, 1979, 1980
- Darren Cole 1980
- Brett Coletta 2015, 2016
- Blake Collyer 2017, 2018, 2019
- Matthew Costigan 1999
- Roger Cowan 1965, 1966, 1967, 1968, 1969, 1970, 1971, 1972
- Darryl Cox 1953
- L Craig 1925
- Jamie Crow 2005, 2006
- Tom Crow 1952, 1953, 1954, 1955, 1957, 1959, 1960, 1961, 1962, 1963
- Sydney Dalrymple 1932, 1935
- Jason Dawes 1993, 1994
- Leigh Deagan 2007
- David Diaz 1987, 1989
- Aiden Didone 2019
- CE Dodge 1913
- Kevin Donohoe 1965
- David Doughton 1948
- FM Douglass 1904
- Geoff Drakeford 2011, 2012, 2013, 2014
- Frazer Droop 2015
- Laurie Duffy 1935, 1936, 1939, 1948, 1949, 1951
- Lee Eagleton 1996
- Ben Eccles 2013, 2014, 2015
- Bill Edgar 1927, 1928, 1930, 1932, 1933, 1935, 1936, 1937, 1939, 1946, 1947, 1948, 1949, 1950, 1951, 1952, 1953, 1956, 1957
- Frederick Fairbairn 1905, 1906
- George Fawcett 1920, 1921, 1922, 1923, 1924, 1928
- Claude Felstead 1906, 1909, 1910, 1911
- Paul Fitzgibbon 1993, 1994
- Bill Fowler 1929
- Marcus Fraser 1999, 2000, 2001
- Daniel Gaunt 1996, 1997, 1998
- Andrew Getson 1997
- Terry Gilmore 1974, 1976
- FJ Glover 1912
- Bill Gluth 1947, 1950, 1951, 1953, 1954, 1955
- Richard Green 1990, 1991, 1992
- Matthew Griffin 2006, 2007, 2008
- Craig Haase 1989, 1990, 1991
- Ashley Hall 2005, 2006
- Stephen Hanson 1982
- David Harding 1986, 1987, 1988, 1989
- Frank Hargreaves 1904
- Kevin Hartley 1958, 1959, 1960, 1961, 1963, 1964, 1965, 1967, 1968, 1969, 1970, 1971, 1972, 1973
- Craig Hasthorpe 2009
- Ryan Haywood 2000, 2001
- Peter Headlam 1926
- Will Heffernan 2016, 2017, 2018
- Grahame Hellessey 1995
- Trevor Henley 1977, 1978, 1980, 1981
- Adam Henwood 1992, 1993
- Lucas Herbert 2013, 2014, 2015
- Luke Hickmott 2001, 2002, 2003, 2004
- Randall Hicks 1969, 1970, 1971, 1972, 1973, 1977
- Bill Higgins 1938, 1939, 1946, 1947, 1952, 1957
- Nathan Holman 2010, 2011, 2012, 2013
- John Hood 1958, 1959, 1960, 1961, 1962, 1963, 1964, 1968, 1969
- Tom Power Horan 2013, 2014, 2015
- Anthony Houston 2011, 2012, 2013
- Jim Howden 1904, 1905, 1908, 1909, 1910, 1911, 1912
- Cameron Howell 1986, 1987, 1988
- Bradley Hughes 1986, 1987, 1988
- Leslie Penfold Hyland 1904
- Gus Jackson 1922, 1925, 1926, 1927, 1928, 1930, 1933, 1934, 1935, 1936, 1937, 1938
- Ray Jenner 1973, 1974, 1975, 1976, 1977, 1978, 1979, 1982, 1983
- Cameron John 2016, 2017
- Phillip Johns 1989, 1990
- Steven Jones 2005
- Martin Joyce 1998, 2000
- Ralph Judd 1958, 1961, 1962, 1963, 1964
- Andrew Kelly 2006
- John Kelly 1977, 1978, 1979, 1980
- Ken Kilburn 1965, 1966, 1969, 1974, 1975
- Jim Kirby 1981, 1982, 1983, 1984
- Andrew Labrooy 1986, 1987
- Brad Lamb 1996, 1997, 1998, 1999
- Andre Lautee 2019
- Marc Leishman 2003, 2004
- K Lewis 1976
- Tony Limon 1970, 1971
- John Lindsay 1970, 1971, 1972, 1973, 1974, 1975, 1976, 1977, 1978, 1981, 1982, 1983, 1984, 1985
- Norman Lockhart 1927, 1930
- Jeremy Loomes 2007
- Jarrod Lyle 2002, 2003, 2004
- Leighton Lyle 2006, 2008
- Richard Macafee 2000
- Bryden Macpherson 2008, 2009
- Keith Macpherson 1954, 1955, 1956, 1957, 1958, 1959, 1960, 1962
- LM MacPherson 1931, 1934
- FS Mann 1910
- Andrew Martin 2004, 2005
- Jamie McCallum 1993, 1994, 1995, 1996
- Stephen McCraw 1988, 1989
- Trevor McDonald 1971, 1972
- Harry McGain 1965, 1966, 1967, 1968
- James McMillan 2012
- Ben Meyers 1998
- Kyle Michel 2016, 2017, 2018, 2019
- Lukas Michel 2016, 2017, 2018, 2019
- David Micheluzzi 2015, 2016, 2017, 2018
- Hartley Mitchell 1948, 1949, 1950, 1955
- Paul Moloney 1986, 1987, 1988, 1989, 1990
- DM Morgan 1909, 1910
- Sloan Morpeth 1932, 1933
- George Morrison 1910, 1911
- Hector Morrison 1907, 1912, 1920, 1921, 1922, 1924
- Frank Murdoch 1909, 1911, 1912, 1913, 1921, 1922
- Zach Murray 2014, 2016, 2017, 2018
- William Nankivell 1928
- Max Nunn 1956
- Geoff Ogilvy 1995, 1996, 1997
- Matthew Oldham 1995
- Dick O'Shea 1961
- Les O'Shea 1960, 1961, 1962, 1963, 1964, 1965, 1967
- A Patterson 1913
- Dick Payne 1935, 1936, 1937, 1938, 1939, 1946, 1947, 1948, 1949
- Bruce Pearce 1920, 1921, 1924
- Cameron Percy 1996, 1997
- Doug Perry 1975, 1978, 1983
- Jason Perry 2006
- Charles Petley 1911, 1912
- Adam Porker 2004
- Kieran Pratt 2009, 2010
- Alistair Presnell 2003
- B Price 1988
- Tom Prowse 2006, 2007, 2008
- Graeme Quinlan 1994, 1995
- Eric Quirk 1913, 1920, 1922, 1923, 1924, 1925, 1929
- Alex Rae 1933, 1936, 1937, 1939
- Alan Reiter 1967, 1968, 1973, 1974, 1975
- Don Reiter 1966, 1967, 1968, 1969, 1970, 1972, 1973, 1974
- I Rhodes 1937
- Walter Carre Riddell 1905, 1906, 1907, 1908, 1909, 1910, 1911, 1913
- R Robson 1904, 1906
- Eric Routley 1949, 1950, 1951, 1952, 1953, 1954, 1955, 1956, 1958, 1959, 1960, 1961, 1962, 1963, 1964, 1966, 1968
- Ryan Ruffels 2013, 2014, 2015
- Alex Russell 1920, 1921, 1922, 1925, 1926, 1927, 1928, 1929, 1930, 1931
- Tom Rutledge 1920, 1921, 1923
- Mick Ryan 1929, 1930, 1931, 1932, 1933, 1934, 1935, 1936, 1937, 1939, 1946
- Michael Sammells 1985, 1986, 1987
- Matias Sanchez 2017, 2018, 2019
- Abe Schlapp 1923, 1924, 1925, 1926, 1928, 1929
- Henry Schlapp 1923, 1925, 1931, 1934
- Andrew Schonewille 2014, 2015, 2016
- LE Schwarz 1926
- Craig Scott 2001, 2003
- Michael Scott 1904, 1905, 1907, 1908, 1909
- Stuart Seear 1985
- James Sharp 1923, 1924, 1927
- Bob Shearer 1970
- Todd Sinnott 2011, 2012, 2013, 2014
- Vic Sleigh 1958
- C Smith 1931, 1932
- David Smith 1980, 1981, 1982, 1983, 1984, 1985
- Paul Spargo 2001, 2002
- Craig Spence 1994, 1995
- Doug Stephens 1956
- Kane Streat 2004, 2005
- John Sutherland 1997, 1998, 1999, 2000
- Peter Sweeney 1976, 1977, 1978, 1979, 1980, 1981, 1983
- Stephen Symons 1992, 1993, 1994
- Andrew Tampion 2002, 2003, 2004, 2005
- Chris Tatt 1979, 1980, 1981, 1982, 1983, 1984
- Jamie Taylor 1990, 1991, 1992
- Paul Thompson 1985
- Peter Thomson 1948
- Neil Titheridge 1961, 1962, 1963, 1964, 1965, 1966, 1967
- Alan Toe 1959, 1960
- Ashley Umbers 2007, 2008, 2009, 2010
- Gavin Vearing 1991, 1993, 1994, 1995
- Terry Vogel 2009, 2010, 2011, 2012
- John Wade 1986, 1988, 1989, 1990
- David Walker 2004, 2005
- Jason Wallis 2001, 2002
- Fred Waters 1906, 1907, 1908
- Andrew Webster 1996, 1997, 1998, 1999, 2000
- Barry West 1949, 1950, 1951, 1952, 1954, 1955, 1956, 1957
- Ivo Whitton 1912, 1913, 1920, 1921, 1922, 1923, 1924, 1926, 1927, 1929, 1930, 1931, 1932, 1933, 1935, 1938
- Harry Williams 1931, 1932, 1934, 1936, 1937, 1938, 1939
- Mark Williamson 1996, 1997, 1999
- Graham Wilson 1950, 1951, 1952, 1954, 1955
- Rick Wines 1971, 1972, 1973, 1974, 1975, 1976
- Tim Wise 1999, 2000
- Eric Wishart 1953, 1954, 1956, 1957, 1958
- Mark Wishart 1985, 1986, 1987, 1988
- Ryan Woodward 2011, 2012
- Josh Younger 2006, 2007, 2008

=== Western Australia ===
Western Australia first competed in 1939 and played in all subsequent events.

- R Abbott 1962
- Dean Alaban 1991, 1992, 1993, 1994, 1995, 1999, 2000, 2001
- Brendon Allanby 2019
- Fritz Arnold 2013
- Warren Baker 1965, 1966, 1970, 1971, 1972, 1973, 1974
- John Banting 1947, 1948, 1953
- John Banting 1981
- Haydn Barron 2016, 2017, 2018, 2019
- Dennis Bell 1957, 1958, 1959, 1960, 1961, 1962, 1963, 1964, 1965, 1966, 1967, 1968, 1969, 1970, 1971, 1972, 1973, 1974, 1975
- Craig Bishop 1998
- Ted Blackman 1952
- Peter Blake 1961, 1962, 1963, 1964, 1965, 1967, 1976
- Garry Briggs 1974, 1975, 1977, 1978, 1979, 1980
- Chris Bright 1987, 1989, 1991, 1992
- David Broadhurst 1947, 1949, 1956
- Ryan Bulloch 2001, 2002, 2003
- Gavin Bunning 1946, 1951
- Glenn Carbon 1976, 1977, 1978, 1979, 1981, 1982, 1983, 1984, 1985, 1986, 1987, 1988, 1989, 1990, 1993
- Peter Carbon 1969, 1972, 1973, 1974, 1976, 1977, 1978, 1979, 1981, 1984, 1985, 1986, 1987
- James Carr 2006
- Greg Carroll 1984
- T Catling 1970, 1973
- Greg Chalmers 1992, 1993, 1994
- Paul Chappell 2014
- Ray Chow 2011, 2012
- Sherman Chua 2013
- D Clarke 1957, 1959, 1960
- Steve Collins 1990, 1991, 1992, 1993
- J Conway 1959, 1961, 1969
- Nick Crundall 1992, 1994, 1995, 1996, 1997, 1998, 1999, 2000
- Nicholas Curnow 2015, 2016
- Charlie Currall 1946, 1947, 1948, 1949, 1950, 1951, 1952, 1953
- Myles Cuthbert 1987, 1988, 1989, 1990
- Stephen Dartnall 2004, 2005, 2006
- Adam Davey 1997, 1998
- Kiran Day 2014, 2015, 2016, 2017, 2018
- Michael Dennis 2002, 2003, 2004, 2005, 2006, 2007, 2008, 2009, 2011, 2012, 2013, 2014
- Harold Digney 1954, 1955, 1956, 1957, 1958, 1960, 1961, 1962, 1963
- Jordan Doull 2017
- Trevor Downing 1970, 1971, 1972, 1974, 1975
- Bill Eddy 1958, 1959, 1960, 1961
- D Elliott 1988
- Tim Elliott 1982, 1983, 1984
- Jon Evans 1985, 1986
- D Ewart 1975, 1976
- John Ewing 1964, 1965, 1966, 1967, 1968, 1969, 1970, 1971, 1972, 1973, 1974, 1975, 1976, 1977, 1978, 1979, 1980
- Shane Feldman 2019
- Jarryd Felton 2012, 2013, 2014, 2015
- Kim Felton 1994, 1995, 1996, 1997, 1998
- Ben Ferguson 2014, 2015, 2016, 2017, 2018
- Connor Fewkes 2018, 2019
- Don Flavel 1963, 1964, 1965, 1966, 1967, 1968, 1972
- Michael Foster 2005, 2006, 2007, 2008
- Daniel Fox 1996, 2002
- Terry Gale 1966, 1967, 1968, 1969, 1970, 1971, 1973, 1974, 1975
- Darren Garrett 1999, 2000
- Cooper Geddes 2017, 2018
- Marco Gemignani 1988
- Stephen Gibbs 2000
- Tom Glendinning 1956, 1958, 1960
- Oliver Goss 2010, 2011, 2012
- Andrew Gott 1987
- Des Grantham 1955
- Chris Gray 1987, 1988, 1989, 1990
- P Green 1977, 1978
- Joshua Greer 2018, 2019
- D Grey 1962
- Brenton Haines 2004, 2006, 2007, 2009, 2010
- Bob Hall 1939, 1946, 1947, 1948, 1949, 1950, 1952
- Colin Hallam 1986
- Larry Harke 1948, 1949, 1950, 1951, 1952, 1955
- Pat Harness 1975, 1979, 1980, 1981
- Ogilvie Harrington 1939
- Adam Hatch 2017
- Joshua Herrero 2019
- Daniel Hoeve 2010, 2011, 2012, 2013
- Hayden Hopewell 2019
- Scott Hunter 2005, 2006, 2007, 2008
- Matt Jager 2007, 2008, 2009
- Clarence Jayatilaka 1984, 1985
- Phil Johnson 1981, 1982, 1983, 1984, 1985, 1986
- Barry Jones 1957, 1958, 1959, 1960, 1972, 1979
- Cameron Jones 2015, 2016
- Jordan Jung 2019
- Calum Juniper 2017
- Brad King 1983, 1984, 1985, 1986
- L Korn 1993
- Rick Kulacz 2000, 2001, 2002, 2003, 2004, 2005, 2006, 2007
- Simon Lacey 1995, 1997
- Stephen Leaney 1988, 1989, 1990, 1991, 1992
- Don Leary 1980, 1981, 1982
- Fred Lee 2016, 2018
- Min Woo Lee 2013, 2014, 2015, 2016, 2017, 2018
- Norm Lewis 1949, 1950, 1951, 1952, 1953
- Brady Lord 2001, 2002
- Curtis Luck 2012, 2013, 2014, 2015, 2016
- Roger Mackay 1977, 1978, 1979, 1980, 1981, 1982
- Shaun Malone 2009
- Craig Mann 1985, 1986
- Graham Marsh 1962, 1963, 1964, 1965, 1966, 1967
- John Martino 2008
- Gordon McAlpine 1939, 1946
- Tony McFadyean 2002, 2003
- Dave McMullan 1961, 1962, 1963, 1964, 1965
- Bill McPherson 1950, 1951, 1952, 1953, 1955, 1957, 1958, 1960
- Alister Miles 2003
- Tony Mills 1987, 1988, 1989
- Brett Mollison 1987, 1988, 1989, 1990, 1991
- Michael Montgomery 2014
- Grant Morgan 1990, 1991, 1995, 1996, 1997, 1998, 1999
- Jarrod Moseley 1992, 1993, 1994, 1995, 1996
- Andy Mowatt 1982, 1983, 1986
- John Muller 1967, 1968, 1969, 1970, 1971, 1973
- Brendon Nazar 2004
- Stan Nicholas 1959
- Brody Ninyette 2007, 2008, 2009, 2010, 2011
- Paul Norcliffe 1980
- Bob Norton 1951, 1954, 1955
- Brad Park 1989, 1990, 1991, 1992, 1993, 1994, 1995, 1996
- DJ Parker 1968
- R Parker 1959, 1960, 1963, 1968, 1969
- Craig Parry 1983, 1984, 1985
- Roy Paxton 1949, 1950, 1951
- Ryan Peake 2010, 2011, 2012
- R Petersen 1977, 1978
- Terry Pilkadaris 1997
- Keith Pix 1939, 1946, 1947
- Pat Prendiville 1953, 1954, 1956, 1960
- Cameron Prentice 1994
- Peter Randall 1969, 1970, 1971, 1972, 1973, 1974, 1975, 1976
- Gavin Reed 2008, 2009, 2010
- Lincoln Reemeyer 1999, 2000, 2001
- Bill Reid 1980, 1981, 1982, 1983
- Norman Robinson 1939
- Kelly Rogers 1947, 1948, 1950, 1952, 1957
- Brett Rumford 1994, 1995, 1996, 1997, 1998, 1999
- Lionel Sangster 1962, 1964
- Jason Scrivener 2007, 2008, 2009
- Benjamin Seward 2015
- Doug Sewell 1946
- Justin Seward 1947, 1949, 1950, 1951, 1952, 1953, 1954, 1955, 1956, 1957, 1958, 1959, 1960, 1961
- Vernon Sexton-Finck 1999, 2000, 2001, 2002, 2003, 2004
- David Shaw 1980
- Michael Sim 2001, 2002, 2003, 2004, 2005
- Glen Slatter 1991
- Gordon Smith 1939
- M Smith 1998
- Wayne Smith 1982, 1983
- B Soulsby 1976, 1977, 1978
- Gary Spinks 1966, 1968
- Cruze Strange 2011
- Scott Strange 1996, 1997, 1998, 1999, 2000, 2001
- Ken Stronach 1953, 1954, 1955, 1956, 1961
- Bob Strutton 1954
- Darren Tan 2003, 2004, 2005
- Ted Taylor 1939, 1946, 1948, 1952, 1954, 1955, 1956, 1958
- Len Thomas 1956
- Len Tidy 1963, 1964, 1965, 1966, 1967
- Tigh Van Leeuwen 2005, 2006
- Ray Wark 1948
- Jamie Warman 2010
- Brady Watt 2009, 2010, 2011, 2012, 2013
- G Wilson 1976
- Ross Woolf 1993, 1994

== See also ==
- Vicars Shield
- Australian Women's Interstate Teams Matches
