= Bob Stevens (golfer) =

Australian amateur golfer

Personal information
- Full name: Robert Francis Stevens
- Nationality: Australia
- Born: 2 October 1928 Adelaide, South Australia
- Died: 3 October 2008 (aged 80) Sydney, New South Wales, Australia

Career
- Sport: Golf
- Status: Amateur

Robert Francis Stevens (2 October 1928 – 3 October 2008) was an Australian amateur golfer. He won the 1952 Australian Amateur. He was a member of the Australian team that won the first Commonwealth Tournament in 1954 and was also in the team that won the inaugural Eisenhower Trophy in 1958.

== Early life ==
Stevens was born in Adelaide on 2 October 1928, the son of Frank Stevens, an on-course bookmaker. At about the age of 8 he started playing golf at Glenelg Golf Club. His younger brother Gavin was also an amateur golfer, and later played Test cricket for Australia.

== Golf career ==
In 1946 Stevens won the South Australian boys championship. There were only 5 entries and his 36-hole score of 151 was 51 strokes ahead of the runner-up, his younger brother Gavin. In 1948 he won the South Australian Close Championship at Royal Adelaide, beating professional Jim Mills in an 18-hole playoff, after the two had tied on 153 in the 36-hole event. The same month he reached the final of the South Australian amateur championship, but lost 6&5 to Victorian Bill Edgar. The following year, 1949, he reached the semi-final of the Australian Amateur, before losing 2&1 to another South Australian, Bill Ackland-Horman. In 1950, Stevens again reached the final of the South Australian amateur championship, but lost to Bill Shephard by 1 hole. In 1951 Stevens suffered from some ill-health and played less golf.

The years from 1952 to 1954 were his most successful. In August 1952 he reached the final of the South Australian amateur at Kooyonga, losing by one hole to Bill Ackland-Horman and then won the South Australian Open title, winning by 5 strokes with a score of 151 at Royal Adelaide. In 1952 both the Australian Open and Australian Amateur championships were held at Lake Karrinyup, the first time either had been held in Western Australia. Stevens finished tied for 12th place in the open. The amateur championship had a 36-hole stroke-play qualifying event with the leading 32 players playing in the match-play stage. Stevens led the qualifiers with a score of 141 and went on to win the title, beating Bill Higgins 7&6 in the final. At the end of 1952 Stevens was a late replacement in the Australian team to tour New Zealand, playing in a number of events including the Sloan Morpeth Trophy.

In 1953, Stevens won the South Australian amateur title for the first time, beating Bill Rymill 5&4 in the final. Soon afterwards he won the South Australian Open title with a score of 147, four strokes ahead of Rymill and Bill Ackland-Horman. In September he played in the Sloan Morpeth Trophy, Australia beating New Zealand in Sydney. However, his mother died and he travelled back to Adelaide, returning to Sydney a few days later to defend his Australian Amateur title. He lost in the third round. In 1954, Stevens was selected as one of the six-man Australian team to play in the inaugural Commonwealth Tournament on the Old Course at St Andrews. The Australians first played in the Amateur Championship, Stevens losing to William C. Campbell at the last-32 stage. The Australian team won the five-team Commonwealth event, with three wins and a tied match against Great Britain. He missed the South Australian Amateur but returned in time to win the South Australian Open title for the third time in a row, with a score of 142, 3 ahead of Bill Ackland-Horman.

In 1958, Ampol sponsored a 36-hole tournament at The Grange in Adelaide, with total prize money of £500, just before the Australian Open at Kooyonga. Stevens won the event with a score of 138, six ahead of Eric Cremin, Harold Henning and Kel Nagle who tied as runners-up. Three members of the team of four for the inaugural Eisenhower Trophy had already been selected and the fourth was to be chosen after the open. Stevens was chosen, with Eric Routley as reserve, despite the fact that Routley had finished 8 strokes ahead of Stevens in the open. Stevens was also made captain of the team. In the Eisenhower Trophy, Australia finished level with the United States after the four rounds. There was an 18-hole playoff with the same format as the main event, the best three scores counting. For Australia, Stevens scored 75, Bruce Devlin 72, and Peter Toogood 75 for a total of 222. For the United States, Charles Coe scored 73, Billy Joe Patton 75 and Bud Taylor 76 for a total of 224, giving Australia a two stroke win.

Stevens played in the 1961 Sloan Morpeth Trophy at Kingston Heath Golf Club. New Zealand won the match, with Stevens losing his singles match to Walter Godfrey. He won the South Australian amateur championship in 1959 and 1961, completing three wins.

Just before his 50th birthday, Stevens reached the quarter-finals of the 1978 Australian Amateur, losing to the eventual winner, Mike Clayton.

== Later life ==
Stevens moved to Sydney in 1966, running a business in the packaging industry. He died on 3 October 2008 after a fatal stroke.

== Tournament wins ==
- 1948 South Australian Close Championship
- 1952 South Australian Open, Australian Amateur
- 1953 South Australian Amateur Championship, South Australian Open
- 1954 South Australian Open
- 1958 Ampol Tournament
- 1959 South Australian Amateur Championship
- 1961 South Australian Amateur Championship

== Team appearances ==
- Eisenhower Trophy (representing Australia): 1958 (winners)
- Commonwealth Tournament (representing Australia): 1954 (winners)
- Sloan Morpeth Trophy (representing Australia): 1952 (tied), 1953 (winners), 1961
- Australian Men's Interstate Teams Matches (representing South Australia): 1946, 1947, 1948, 1949, 1950, 1951, 1952, 1953, 1955, 1956, 1958, 1960, 1961, 1962 (joint winners), 1963
