= South Australian Open (golf) =

Jacob's Creek Open Championship

Tournament information
- Location: Lockleys, South Australia, Australia
- Established: 1933
- Course: Kooyonga Golf Club
- Par: 72
- Length: 6,795 yards (6,213 m)
- Tours: PGA Tour of Australasia; Nationwide Tour
- Format: Stroke play
- Prize fund: US$600,000
- Month played: February
- Final year: 2007

Tournament record score
- Aggregate: 267 Gordon Brand Jnr (1988)
- To par: −19 Peter Lonard (2000)

Final champion
- (United States) Scott Sterling

Location map
- Location in Australia Location in South Australia

The South Australian Open was a golf tournament on the PGA Tour of Australasia and the Nationwide Tour.

== History ==
The event started in 1933 as the South Australian Close Championship. In 1950 it was renamed the South Australian Open, although it was only in 1952 that it was opened up to players from outside the state.

In the late 1960s, there was no sponsor for the tournament; therefore, only local club professionals competed." In 1975 the problem recurred when the South Australian Brewing Company did not renew its sponsorship. An economic downturn discouraged other companies from sponsoring, and the event did not take place that year.

The event was retitled the Jacob's Creek Open Championship from 2002 to 2007, sponsored by the Jacob's Creek wine brand, and was co-sanctioned during that period by the United States–based Nationwide Tour. It was played annually in Adelaide. In 2007, the last time the tournament was held, it was one of three tournaments on the Nationwide Tour held outside the United States. After Jacob's Creek withdrew their support following the 2007 event, the search for a new sponsor proved fruitless and the tournament was cancelled.

== Winners ==
Year	Tour(s) (Note: ANZ − PGA Tour of Australasia; BUY/NWT − Buy.com Tour/Nationwide Tour)	Winner	Score	To par	Margin of victory	Runner(s)-up	Venue	Ref.
Jacob's Creek Open Championship
2007	ANZ, NWT	(United States) Scott Sterling (Note: Gained promotion to the PGA Tour at the end of the Nationwide Tour season.)	276	−12	1 stroke	(Australia) David Lutterus	Kooyonga	
2006	ANZ, NWT	(Australia) Paul Sheehan	281	−7	Playoff	(Australia) Michael Sim	Royal Adelaide	
2005	ANZ, NWT	(Australia) Steven Bowditch	277	−11	5 strokes	(United States) Ryan Armour (Australia) Nathan Green	Royal Adelaide	
Jacob's Creek Open
2004	ANZ, NWT	(Australia) Euan Walters	275	−9	5 strokes	(Australia) Wayne Grady (Australia) Brendan Jones (Australia) Anthony Painter	Kooyonga	
2003	ANZ, NWT	(United States) Joe Ogilvie	279	−5	1 stroke	(Australia) Shane Tait	Kooyonga	
Jacob's Creek Open Championship
2002	ANZ, BUY	(Australia) Gavin Coles	279	−9	2 strokes	(United States) Bryce Molder	Kooyonga	
Ford South Australian Open
2001: No tournament due to scheduling changes								
2000	ANZ	(Australia) Peter Lonard	269	−19	6 strokes	(Australia) Paul Gow	Kooyonga	
1999	ANZ	(Australia) Craig Parry	274	−14	5 strokes	(Scotland) Raymond Russell	Kooyonga	
1998	ANZ	(Australia) Stuart Bouvier	282	−6	2 strokes	(Australia) Stephen Allan (Australia) Craig Parry	Kooyonga	
1997	ANZ	(New Zealand) Steven Alker	273	−15	1 stroke	(Australia) Wayne Grady	Kooyonga	
1996	ANZ	(Australia) Greg Norman (2)	284	−4	1 stroke	(France) Jean-Louis Guépy	Kooyonga	
1995	ANZ	(Australia) Tim Elliott	275	−17	3 strokes	(United States) Jack O'Keefe (Australia) Anthony Painter	Royal Adelaide	
Eagle Blue Open
1994: No tournament due to scheduling changes								
1993	ANZ	(Australia) Wayne Smith	210 (Note: Shortened to 54 holes due to weather.)	−9	Playoff	(Australia) Jim Kennedy (United States) Kevin Miskimins	Royal Adelaide	
1992	ANZ	(Australia) Brett Ogle (2)	280	−12	1 stroke	(Australia) Craig Warren	Royal Adelaide	
West End South Australian Open
1991	ANZ	(Australia) Brett Ogle	279	−13	2 strokes	(Australia) Mike Harwood	Royal Adelaide	
1990	ANZ	(Australia) Mike Harwood	278	−14	5 strokes	(Australia) Paul Moloney (New Zealand) Simon Owen	Royal Adelaide	
1989	ANZ	(Zimbabwe) Nick Price	277	−15	5 strokes	(Australia) Lucien Tinkler (Australia) Paul Foley	Royal Adelaide	
1988	ANZ	(Scotland) Gordon Brand Jnr	267	−13	7 strokes	(Australia) Greg Alexander (Australia) Wayne Grady	The Grange	
1987	ANZ	(Northern Ireland) Ronan Rafferty	280	−8	1 stroke	(Australia) Peter Fowler	The Grange	
West End Jubilee South Australian Open
1986	ANZ	(Australia) Greg Norman	283	−5	3 strokes	(Australia) David Graham	Kooyonga	
Ford Dealers South Australian Open
1985	ANZ	(Australia) Vaughan Somers	284	−4	2 strokes	(Australia) Gerry Taylor	Kooyonga	
1984	ANZ	(Australia) Bob Shearer	286	−2	1 stroke	(Australia) Terry Gale	Kooyonga	
1983	ANZ	(Australia) Terry Gale	281	−7	1 stroke	(Australia) Wayne Grady	Kooyonga	
1982	ANZ	(Australia) Graham Marsh	275	−13	8 strokes	(Australia) Bill Dunk	Kooyonga	
South Australian Open
1981	ANZ	(Australia) Lyndsay Stephen	282	−6	3 strokes	(Australia) Rodger Davis	Glenelg	
Dunhill South Australian Open
1980	ANZ	(New Zealand) Simon Owen	291	+3	1 stroke	(Australia) Rodger Davis (Australia) Greg Norman	Kooyonga	
1979	ANZ	(Australia) Peter Senior	282	−6	Playoff	(Australia) Graham Stevens (a)	Glenelg	
South Australian Open
1978	ANZ	(Australia) Tony Gresham (a)	282	−6	6 strokes	(Australia) Chris Bonython (a)	Glenelg	
1977	ANZ	(Australia) Noel Ratcliffe	287	−5	Playoff	(Australia) David Galloway	Royal Adelaide	
1976	ANZ	(Australia) David Galloway	285	−3	2 strokes	(Australia) Frank Phillips (England) Guy Wolstenholme	Kooyonga	
1975: No tournament								
1974	ANZ	(Australia) Ray Hore	288	E	1 stroke	(Australia) David Galloway (Australia) Randall Vines	Glenelg	
1973	ANZ	(Australia) Ted Ball (2)	286	−2	1 stroke	(New Zealand) Terry Kendall	The Grange	
1972		(Australia) Ted Ball	294	+2	3 strokes	(Australia) Bill Dunk (Australia) Stan Peach	The Grange	
1971		(England) Guy Wolstenholme	288	E	2 strokes	(Australia) Bob Tuohy	Kooyonga	
1970		(Australia) Bill Dunk	275	−13	8 strokes	(Australia) Frank Phillips	Glenelg	
1969		(New Zealand) Brian Boys	222	+6	Playoff	(Australia) Ted Ball (Australia) Frank Phillips	The Grange	
1968		(Australia) Peter Thomson	293	+1	9 strokes	(New Zealand) Walter Godfrey	Royal Adelaide	
1967		(Australia) John Sullivan	144	E			Glenelg	
1966		(Australia) Brian Crafter	141	−3			The Grange	
1965		(Australia) Murray Crafter (3)	144	E	1 stroke	(Australia) Brian Crafter	Kooyonga	
1964		(Australia) Bob Mesnil (a)	145	−1			Royal Adelaide	
1963		(Australia) Murray Crafter (2)	148	+4			Glenelg	
1962		(Australia) Murray Crafter	143	−1			The Grange	
1961		(Australia) Harry Thredgold (a)	148	+4			Kooyonga	
1960		(Australia) Bill Shephard (a) (2)	141	−5			Royal Adelaide	
1955–1959: No information known
1954		(Australia) Bob Stevens (a) (4)	142		3 strokes	(Australia) Bill Ackland-Horman (a)	Royal Adelaide	
1953		(Australia) Bob Stevens (a) (3)	147		4 strokes	(Australia) Bill Ackland-Horman (a) (Australia) Bill Rymill (a)	Kooyonga	
1952		(Australia) Bob Stevens (a) (2)	141		5 strokes	(Australia) Harry Thredgold (a)	Royal Adelaide	
1951		(Australia) John Wilkin (a)	149		5 strokes	(Australia) Bill Ackland-Horman (a)	Kooyonga	
1950		(Australia) Bill Shephard (a)	145		3 strokes	(Australia) Bill Ackland-Horman (a)	Royal Adelaide	
South Australian Close Championship
1949		(Australia) Bill Ackland-Horman (a) (3)	148		2 strokes	(Australia) John Wilkin (a)	Kooyonga	
1948		(Australia) Bob Stevens (a)	153		Playoff	(Australia) Jim Mills	Royal Adelaide	
1947		(Australia) Bill Ackland-Horman (a) (2)	152		Playoff	(Australia) Denis Denehey	Kooyonga	
1946		(Australia) Bill Ackland-Horman (a)	148		2 strokes	(Australia) Jack Richardson (a)	Royal Adelaide	
1940–1945: No tournament due to World War II
1939		(Australia) Bill Rymill (a)	143		3 strokes	(Australia) Rufus Stewart	Kooyonga	
1938		(Australia) Fergus McMahon (4)	145		2 strokes	(Australia) Bill Ackland-Horman (a)	Royal Adelaide	
1937		(Australia) Fergus McMahon (3)	142		4 strokes	(Australia) Dallas Crook (a)	Kooyonga	
1936		(Australia) Fergus McMahon (2)	146		2 strokes	(Australia) Ross Sawers (a)	Royal Adelaide	
1935		(Australia) Jimmy McLachlan	144		3 strokes	(Australia) Bill Rymill (a)	Kooyonga	
1934		(Australia) Rufus Stewart	145		3 strokes	(Australia) Fred Thompson	Royal Adelaide	
1933		(Australia) Fergus McMahon	151		Playoff	(Australia) Bill Ackland-Horman (a)	Kooyonga	
