= 2007 PGA Tour of Australasia =

Golf tour season

2007 PGA Tour of Australasia season
- Duration: 15 February 2007 – 16 December 2007
- Number of official events: 7
- Order of Merit: (Australia) Craig Parry

The 2007 PGA Tour of Australasia was the 35th season on the PGA Tour of Australasia, the main professional golf tour in Australia and New Zealand since it was formed in 1973.

== Schedule ==
The following table lists official events during the 2007 season.

Date	Tournament	Location	Purse (A$)	Winner (Note: The number in brackets after each winner's name is the number of PGA Tour of Australasia events they had won up to and including that tournament. This information is only shown for PGA Tour of Australasia members.)	OWGR points	Other tours (Note: AFR − Sunshine Tour; ASA − Asian Tour; EUR − European Tour; NWT − Nationwide Tour.)	Notes
18 Feb	Jacob's Creek Open Championship	South Australia	US$600,000	(United States) Scott Sterling (1)	16	NWT	
25 Feb	HSBC New Zealand PGA Championship	New Zealand	US$600,000	(United States) Nicholas Thompson (n/a)	16	NWT	
4 Mar	Johnnie Walker Classic	Thailand	£1,250,000	(South Africa) Anton Haig (n/a)	40	ASA, EUR	
25 Nov	MasterCard Masters	Victoria	1,500,000	(Australia) Aaron Baddeley (4)	24	EUR	
2 Dec	Michael Hill New Zealand Open	New Zealand	NZ$1,500,000	(England) Richard Finch (n/a)	20	EUR	
9 Dec	Cadbury Schweppes Australian PGA Championship	Queensland	1,200,000	(Australia) Peter Lonard (9)	32		
16 Dec	MFS Australian Open	New South Wales	1,750,000	(Australia) Craig Parry (12)	34		Flagship event

=== Unofficial events ===
The following events were sanctioned by the PGA Tour of Australasia, but did not carry official money, nor were wins official.

Date	Tournament	Location	Purse (A$)	Winner	OWGR points	Other tours	Notes
11 Nov	HSBC Champions	China	US$5,000,000	(United States) Phil Mickelson	52	AFR, (Note: Sunshine Tour unofficial event) ASA, (Note: Asian Tour unofficial event) EUR	Limited-field event

== Order of Merit ==
The Order of Merit was based on prize money won during the season, calculated in Australian dollars.

Position	Player	Prize money (A$)
1	(Australia) Craig Parry	442,004
2	(New Zealand) David Smail	168,461
3	(Australia) Paul Sheehan	154,440
4	(United States) Scott Sterling	150,747
5	(Australia) Greg Chalmers	150,342

== Von Nida Tour ==
2007 Von Nida Tour season
- Duration: 25 January 2007 – 11 November 2007
- Number of official events: 10
- Most wins: (Australia) Jason Norris (2)
- Order of Merit: (Australia) Andrew Bonhomme

The 2007 Von Nida Tour was the fifth season of the Von Nida Tour, the official development tour to the PGA Tour of Australasia between 2003 and 2008.

=== Schedule ===
The following table lists official events during the 2007 season.

Date	Tournament	Location	Purse (A$)	Winner (Note: The number in brackets after each winner's name is the number of Von Nida Tour events they had won up to and including that tournament. It is rare for someone to accumulate many wins on the Von Nida Tour as success at this level usually leads to promotion to the PGA Tour of Australasia.)	Ref.
28 Jan	NAB Victorian PGA Championship	Victoria	105,000	(Australia) Ashley Hall (1)	
4 Feb	Victorian Open	Victoria	110,000	(Australia) Kim Felton (5)	
11 Feb	Riverside Oaks NSW PGA Championship	New South Wales	110,000	(Australia) Scott Draper (1)	
25 Mar	Toyota Southern Classic	New South Wales	100,000	(Australia) Marc Leishman (3)	
22 Apr	Hahn South Australian PGA Championship	South Australia	105,000	(Australia) Tim Wise (1)	
27 May	Oceanique WA PGA Championship	Western Australia	105,000	(Australia) Jason Norris (1)	
21 Oct	North Queensland X-Ray Services Cairns Classic	Queensland	105,000	(Australia) Paul Donahoo (1)	
28 Oct	City Pacific-Mirvac Queensland Open	Queensland	105,000	(Australia) Ryan Haller (1)	
4 Nov	Greater Building Society Queensland PGA Championship	Queensland	105,000	(Australia) Andrew Bonhomme (1)	
11 Nov	Vintage NSW Open	New South Wales	115,000	(Australia) Jason Norris (2)	

=== Order of Merit ===
The Order of Merit was based on prize money won during the season, calculated in Australian dollars. The top 10 players on the Order of Merit earned status to play on the 2008 PGA Tour of Australasia.

Position	Player	Prize money (A$)
1	(Australia) Andrew Bonhomme	41,497
2	(Australia) Jason Norris	41,339
3	(Australia) Marc Leishman	36,265
4	(Australia) Ashley Hall	30,781
5	(Australia) Ryan Haller	29,929
6	(Australia) Tim Wise	26,605
7	(Australia) Ed Stedman	25,821
8	(Australia) Aaron Townsend	23,955
9	(Australia) Paul Donahoo	22,943
10	(Australia) Kim Felton	20,988
