= Leedham =

Leedham is a surname. Notable people with the surname include:

- Johannah Leedham (born 1987), British basketballer
- John Leedham (born 1928), Australian footballer
- Michael Leedham (born 1950), Australian cricketer

== See also ==
- Leedham Bantock (1870–1928), British singer, actor, and screenwriter
- Charles Leedham-Green
