= Gavin Stevens =

Australian cricketer

Personal information
- Full name: Gavin Byron Stevens
- Born: 29 February 1932 (age 94); Glenelg, Adelaide, South Australia
- Batting: Right-handed

International information
- National side: Australia
- Test debut (cap 214): 21 November 1959 v Pakistan
- Last Test: 1 January 1960 v India

Domestic team information
- Years: Team
- 1952–53 to 1958–59: South Australia

Career statistics
Competition	Tests	First-class
Matches	4	47
Runs scored	112	3061
Batting average	16.00	38.26
100s/50s	0/0	7/11
Top score	28	259*
Balls bowled	0	224
Wickets	–	3
Bowling average	–	41.00
5 wickets in innings	–	0
10 wickets in match	–	0
Best bowling	–	2/16
Catches/stumpings	2/–	34/–
- Source: Cricinfo

Gavin Byron Stevens (born 29 February 1932) is a former Australian cricketer who played in four Tests in the 1959–60 season. He played first-class cricket for South Australia from 1952–53 to 1958–59.

Stevens was born in Adelaide and educated there at St Peter's College.

A tall, strongly-built opening batsman, Stevens made his debut for South Australia in 1952–53. He scored consistently in the Sheffield Shield in 1956–57, 1957–58, and in 1958–59, when he made 951 runs in the season at 59.43 with three centuries. In December 1958, against New South Wales in Sydney, he made 57 and 259 not out.

Stevens was selected for Australia's tour to Pakistan and India in 1959–60 and played two Tests in each country with a top score of 28 against Pakistan in Karachi, before contracting a severe case of hepatitis. Although he recovered, he never played first-class cricket again.

His older brother Bob was an amateur golfer who won the Australian Amateur in 1952.

Stevens had a successful business career. A biography, Near Death on the Sub-Continent: The Gavin Stevens Story by David Jenkins, was published in 2012. As of 2023 he lives in southern Queensland.
