= Kooyonga Golf Club =

Golf club in Lockleys, South Australia

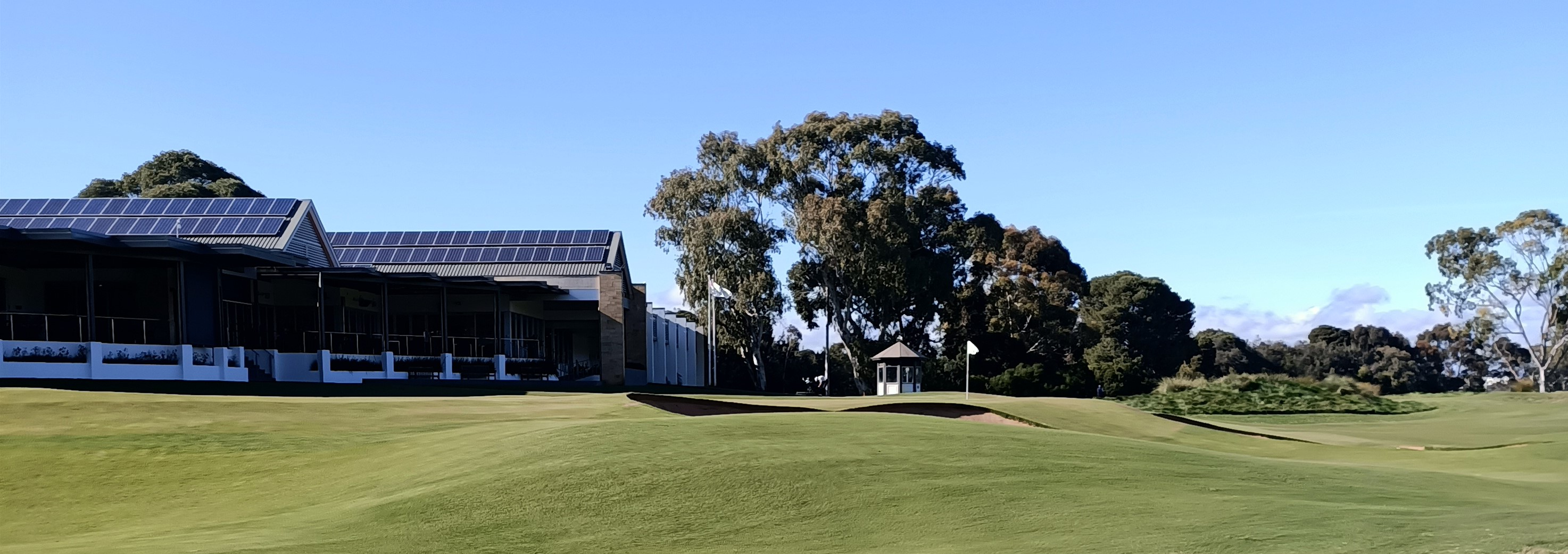

- Location in Australia
- 34.928°S 138.533°E

Club information
- Location: Lockleys, South Australia, Australia
- Established: 1923; 103 years ago
- Type: Private
- Total holes: 18
- Tournaments: Australian Open
- Website: kooyongagolf.com.au
- Designed by: H.C. Rymill
- Par: 72
- Length: 6,308 m (6,899 yd)

Kooyonga Golf Club is a private golf club in Australia, located in South Australia at Lockleys, a suburb west of Adelaide. Members entry is off May Terrace, Brooklyn Park.

== History ==
Work on the course started in 1922 and the first nine holes opened on 19 May 1923. In August, the course hosted a country championship, for players from outside Adelaide, won by Mr. Haehrmann from Ambleside. The same month the Australian Open was played at Royal Adelaide and the opportunity was taken to organise a 36-hole professional event at the club, on the day after the open. Arthur Ham won the event with a score of 161, a stroke ahead of Arthur Le Fevre. the course was extended to 18 holes in 1924.

The Simpson Cup was originally for competition between The Kooyonga Golf Club & The Royal Adelaide Golf Club from 1927 to 1938. Post World War 2 The Grange & Glenelg Golf Clubs joined the annual competition and in 2008 Southern District and Mid-North District entered teams also. As at 2022 Kooyonga has won 33 Simpson Cups and Royal Adelaide has won 10

Kooyonga has hosted seven Australian Opens (five men's and two women's), twenty South Australian Opens and two Australian Amateur Championships.

- Golf icon Walter Hagen played the Kooyonga Golf Course in the 1930s. Sensationally, the Kooyonga Golf Club Secretary of the time was arrested and remanded for embezzling 131 pounds that was to be paid to Walter Hagen and J Kirkwood. However a few years later when asked about Australian Golf Courses, Hagen mentioned Kooyonga as the one he rated extremely highly, describing the course as a "hard test".
- In 1950 Harry Vardon Trophy winner Norman Von Nida won the Australian Open at Kooyonga
- In 1961 American Golf Great, The King Arnold Palmer defeated Gary Player by 4 strokes at Kooyonga
- The Black Knight Gary Player has won two Australian Opens there and in 1965, the Golden Bear, Jack Nicklaus was runner up to Player in the Australian Open at Kooyonga.
- Five times British Open winner, and Presidents Cup winning Captain, Peter Thomson won the Australian Open at Kooyonga in 1972.
- LIV Golf CEO, the Great White Shark, Greg Norman has played at Kooyonga on a number of occasions, winning the South Australian Open there twice Greg Norman regarded winning the 1996 South Australian Open at Kooyonga as particularly important for him
- In 2018 the world number 1 female golfer, Ko Jin-Young won the Women's Australian Open at Kooyonga

The Women's Australian Open was scheduled to return to Kooyonga in February 2022, however Covid travel restrictions have caused that event to be cancelled for the year.

The Women's Australian Open returned to the Kooyonga Golf Club in March 2026 and was won by Australian Golfer Hannah Green (golfer).

The golf course also has a history of high-profile members, including Sir Donald Bradman, Australian Test Cricket player and media personality Greg Blewett, Tennis legend Mark Woodforde, Cricket legend Rod Marsh, Australian Cricketer Callum Ferguson, and State Footballer Andrew Payze among other captains of South Australian and Australian Industry

Kooyonga Golf Course, albeit exclusive is noted as a significant attraction for interstate and international visitors by the South Australian Government Tourism Commission

In 2024 the Australian Golf Digest Magazine ranked the top 100 Golf Courses in Australia, and Kooyonga was elevated to the number 18 position on that list.

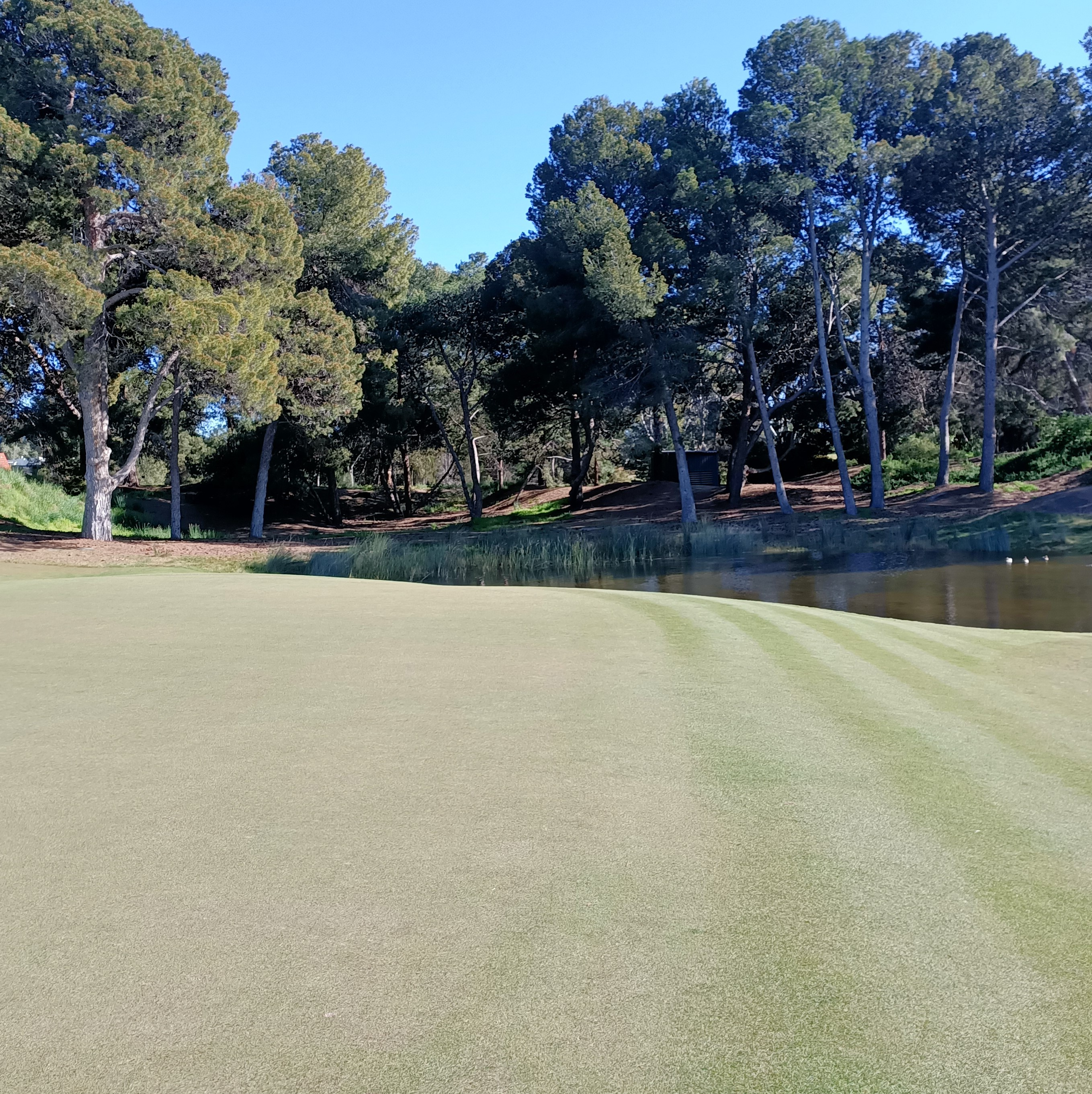
A green at Kooyonga Golf Club

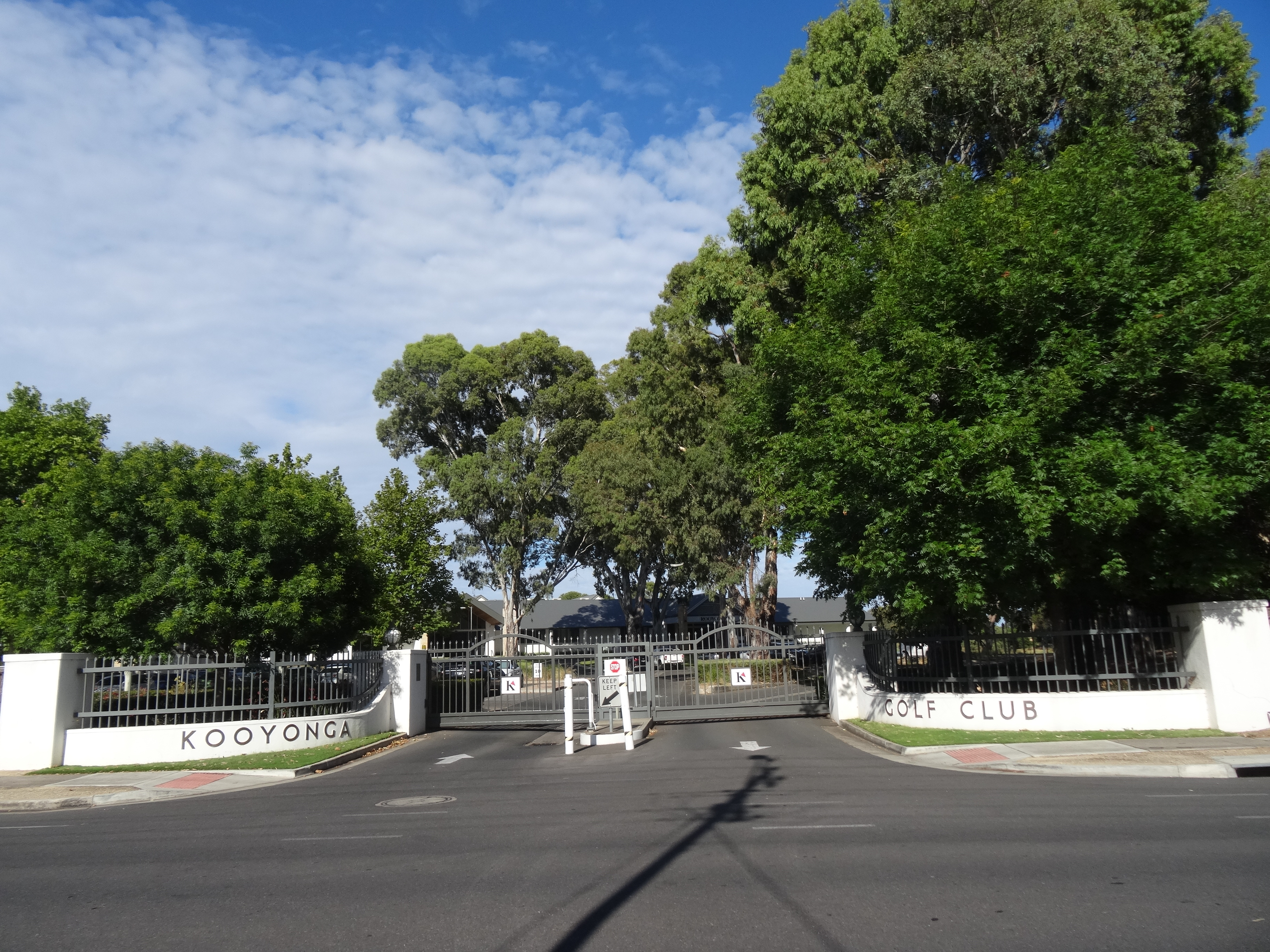
Kooyonga Golf Club main entrance

== Tournaments hosted ==
- 2026 Women's Australian Open
- 2021 Australian Amateur
- 2018 Women's Australian Open
- 2007 South Australian Open
- 1996-2004 South Australian Open
- 1982-86 South Australian Open
- 1980 South Australian Open
- 1976 South Australian Open
- 1972 Australian Open
- 1971 South Australian Open
- 1966 Adelaide Advertiser Tournament
- 1965 South Australian Open
- 1964 Adelaide Advertiser Tournament
- 1965 Australian Open
- 1962 Adelaide Advertiser Tournament
- 1962 Australian Amateur
- 1961 South Australian Open
- 1960 Adelaide Advertiser Tournament
- 1958 Adelaide Advertiser Tournament
- 1958 Australian PGA Championship
- 1958 Australian Open
- 1956 Adelaide Advertiser Tournament
- 1954 Australian Open
- 1951 Adelaide Advertiser Tournament
- 1950 Australian Open
- 1949 Adelaide Advertiser Tournament
