= Jason Norris =

Australian professional golfer (born 1972)

Personal information
- Nationality: Australia
- Born: 7 September 1972 (age 54) Melbourne, Victoria, Australia
- Height: 6 ft 3 in (1.91 m)
- Weight: 175 lb (79 kg; 12.5 st)

Career
- Sport: Golf
- Status: Professional
- Current tours: PGA Tour of Australasia; European Senior Tour
- Former tour: European Tour
- Professional wins: 9

Number of wins by tour
- European Tour: 1
- Asian Tour: 1
- PGA Tour of Australasia: 2
- Other: 7

Jason Norris (born 7 September 1972) is an Australian professional golfer.

== Career ==
In 2007, Norris won the New South Wales Open and the Western Australia PGA Championship; both were part of the developmental Von Nida Tour.

Norris also won the 2010 Victorian Open. He was runner-up at the 2012 New Zealand Open. In 2015, he was runner-up at the Maekyung Open.

Norris won the 2017 Fiji International by four strokes. The event was multi-sanctioned by the European Tour, Asian Tour, and PGA Tour of Australasia. In the final round, he had eight birdies against three bogeys. He entered the tournament ranked 1238th in the world.

== Professional wins (9) ==
=== European Tour wins (1) ===
No.	Date	Tournament	Winning score	Margin of victory	Runners-up
1	20 Aug 2017	Fiji International^{1}	−14 (69-68-70-67=274)	4 strokes	(Thailand) Jazz Janewattananond, (Australia) David McKenzie, (Australia) James Marchesani

^{1}Co-sanctioned by the Asian Tour and the PGA Tour of Australasia

=== PGA Tour of Australasia wins (2) ===
No.	Date	Tournament	Winning score	Margin of victory	Runner(s)-up
1	10 Jan 2010	Subaru Victorian Open	−10 (68-70-67-69=274)	2 strokes	(Australia) Chris Campbell
2	20 Aug 2017	Fiji International^{1}	−14 (69-68-70-67=274)	4 strokes	(Thailand) Jazz Janewattananond, (Australia) David McKenzie, (Australia) James Marchesani

^{1}Co-sanctioned by the European Tour and the Asian Tour

PGA Tour of Australasia playoff record (0–1)

No.	Year	Tournament	Opponent	Result
1	2025	Webex Players Series Murray River	(Australia) Blake Proverbs	Lost to par on third extra hole

=== Von Nida Tour wins (2) ===
No.	Date	Tournament	Winning score	Margin of victory	Runner-up
1	27 May 2007	Oceanique WA PGA Championship	−7 (71-66-70-74=281)	1 stroke	(Australia) Aaron Townsend
2	11 Nov 2007	Vintage NSW Open	−7 (70-69-69-69=277)	1 stroke	(Australia) Jarrod Lyle

=== PGA of Australia Legends Tour wins (6) ===
- 2025 Murray Bridge GC Legends Pro-Am, Ray White Yamba Legends Pro-Am (with Andre Stolz), Sharp EIT Solutions Australian PGA Senior Championship, The Australian Golf Club Legends Pro-Am (with Brendan Jones)

=== Other senior wins (1) ===
- 2024 Lyndsay Stephen Cottesloe Invitational

== Results in World Golf Championships ==
Tournament	2018
Championship	
Match Play	
Invitational	
Champions	T50

Did not play

"T" = Tied
