= 1958 Eisenhower Trophy =

Coordinates: 56.343°N 2.803°W

Tournament information
- Dates: 8–11, 13 October
- Location: St Andrews, Scotland
- Course: Old Course
- Format: 72 holes stroke play

Statistics
- Par: 72
- Length: 6,996 yards (6,397 m)
- Field: 29 teams 115 players

Champion
- Australia; Doug Bachli, Bruce Devlin, Bob Stevens & Peter Toogood
- 918 (+54), playoff

The 1958 Eisenhower Trophy took place 8–11 and 13 October on the Old Course in St Andrews, Scotland. It was the first World Amateur Team Championship for the Eisenhower Trophy. The tournament was a 72-hole stroke play team event with 29 four-man teams. The best three scores for each round counted towards the team total.

Australia won the Eisenhower Trophy, beating the United States by 222 to 224 in a playoff after both teams had finished on 918. The United States took the silver medal. Great Britain and Ireland finished a stroke behind and took the bronze medal while New Zealand, who led after 54 holes, finished fourth.

The playoff took place on Monday 13 October and followed the same format as the main event with the leading three scores counting. For Australia, Doug Bachli scored 77, Bruce Devlin 72, Bob Stevens 75 and Peter Toogood 75 for a total of 222. For the United States, Charles Coe scored 73, Bill Hyndman 78, Billy Joe Patton 75 and Bud Taylor 76 for a total of 224.

== Teams ==
29 teams contested the event. Each team had four players with the exception of team Republic of China, which were represented by only three players.

| Country | Players |
|---|---|
| Argentina | Carlos Bracht, Oscar Cella, Jorge Ledesma, Hugo Nicora |
| Australia | Doug Bachli, Bruce Devlin, Bob Stevens, Peter Toogood |
| Austria | Heinrich Harrer, Hugo Hild, Alexander Maculan, Attilio Conte de Smecchia |
| Belgium | Jacky Moerman, Freddy Rodesch, Paul Rolin, Eric Tavernier |
| Bermuda | Ronald A. Dwyer, C.H. Ford Hutchings, Richard S.L. Pearlman, George E. Wardman |
| Brazil | Humberto C. De Almeida, Raul Borges, Joao Barbosa Correa, Silvio Pinto Freire |
| Canada | Doug Bajus, Bruce Castator, Eric Hanson, Bob Kidd |
| China | Chang Tung-chang, Jeffrey Koo, Richard Koo |
| Finland | Jalo Grönlund, Eero Hänninen, Taavi Pohjanpalo, Mauri Vikström |
| France | Henri de Lamaze, Marius Bardana, Roger Lagarde, Jean-Pierre Hirigoyen |
| Great Britain & Ireland | Joe Carr, Reid Jack, Arthur Perowne, Guy Wolstenholme |
| Iceland | Sveinn Arsaeksson, Magnus Gudmundsson, Hermann Ingimarsson, Ólafur August Ólafsson |
| India | A.S. Malik, C-I. S. Malik, R.K. Pitamber, P. G. Sethi |
| Italy | Nadi Berruti, Franco Bevione, Angelo Croce, Alberto Schiaffino |
| Japan | Kiyoshi Ishimoto, Naoyasu Nabeshima, Ichizo Oguri, Junzo Shibamoto |
| Kenya | William N.B. Loudon, Alistair J. Robertson, Christopher L.D. Sykes, Peter G. Tait |
| Malaya | W.J. Gibb, J.C. Hutcheson, J.W.R. Muraille, K.C. MacNair |
| Netherlands | J.F. Dudok, A.F. Knappert, W. van Moorsel, W.F. Smit |
| Norway | John Johansen, Kåre Kittilsen, Erik Osland, Einar Wahlstøm |
| New Zealand | Bob Charles, John Durry, Stuart Jones, Ted McDougall |
| Philippines | Mel Gana, Alex Prieto, Francisco Reyes Jr, Luis Silverio |
| Portugal | Manuel de Brito e Cunha, Visconde de Pereira Machado, Duarte Espirito Santo Silva, José de Sousa e Melo |
| South Africa | Jimmy Boyd, Denis Hutchinson, Arthur Stewart, Arthur Walker |
| Spain | Juan Antonio Andreu, Duke de Fernán-Núñez, Iván Maura, Luis Rezola |
| Sweden | Gustaf Adolf Bielke, Gunnar Carlander, Rune Karlfeldt, Bengt Möller |
| Switzerland | André Barras, Oliviér Barras, Peter Gutermann, John Panchaud |
| United States | Charles Coe, Bill Hyndman, Billy Joe Patton, Bud Taylor |
| Venezuela | Jack Alexander Jr, Guillermo Behrens, Jack Corrie, Fernan Frias |
| West Germany | Werner Götz, Hans Lampert, Jean Phillipps, Erik Sellschopp |

== Results ==
| Place | Country | Score | To par |
|---|---|---|---|
| 1st place, gold medalist(s) | Australia | 244-226-221-227=918 | +54 |
| 2nd place, silver medalist(s) | United States | 233-232-225-228=918 | +54 |
| 3rd place, bronze medalist(s) | Great Britain & Ireland | 227-234-230-228=919 | +55 |
| 4 | New Zealand | 236-226-225-234=921 | +57 |
| 5 | Argentina | 236-242-232-230=940 | +76 |
| T6 | Canada | 240-241-228-236=945 | +81 |
| T6 | South Africa | 246-231-229-239=945 | +81 |
| 8 | France | 242-240-231-236=949 | +85 |
| 9 | Sweden | 251-242-227-237=957 | +93 |
| 10 | Italy | 246-239-237-241=963 | +99 |
| 11 | Belgium | 245-250-229-240=964 | +100 |
| 12 | Philippines | 248-245-239-238=970 | +106 |
| 13 | Spain | 249-254-234-237=974 | +110 |
| T14 | India | 244-251-237-249=981 | +117 |
| T14 | Switzerland | 249-244-243-245=981 | +117 |
| 16 | Bermuda | 249-251-240-245=985 | +121 |
| T17 | West Germany | 260-260-241-237=998 | +134 |
| T17 | Kenya | 253-259-239-247=998 | +134 |
| 19 | Netherlands | 250-256-253-246=1005 | +141 |
| 20 | Japan | 250-255-244-257=1006 | +142 |
| 21 | Brazil | 253-262-249-245=1009 | +145 |
| 22 | Venezuela | 264-261-242-248=1015 | +151 |
| 23 | Finland | 265-255-242-255=1017 | +153 |
| 24 | Malaya | 262-257-252-258=1029 | +165 |
| 25 | Norway | 261-262-263-254=1040 | +176 |
| T26 | China | 269-268-260-252=1049 | +185 |
| T26 | Portugal | 259-269-265-256=1049 | +185 |
| 28 | Austria | 268-272-269-262=1071 | +207 |
| 29 | Iceland | 273-277-263-271=1084 | +220 |

Playoff scores: Australia: 222 (+6), United States: 224 (+8)

== Individual leaders ==
There was no official recognition for the lowest individual scores.

| Place | Player | Country | Score | To par |
|---|---|---|---|---|
| T1 | Bruce Devlin | Australia | 81-73-74-73=301 | +13 |
| T1 | Bill Hyndman | United States | 79-77-73-72=301 | +13 |
| T1 | Reid Jack | Great Britain & Ireland | 72-77-74-78=301 | +13 |
| T4 | Bob Charles | New Zealand | 74-74-76-81=305 | +17 |
| T4 | Charles Coe | United States | 74-77-76-78=305 | +17 |
| 6 | Henri de Lamaze | France | 77-77-75-78=307 | +19 |
| 7 | Luis Silverio | Philippines | 75-81-77-75=308 | +20 |
| T8 | Bob Stevens | Australia | 82-77-76-75=310 | +22 |
| T8 | Peter Toogood | Australia | 84-76-71-79=310 | +22 |
| T8 | Arthur Walker | South Africa | 83-74-74-79=310 | +22 |
| T8 | Guy Wolstenholme | Great Britain & Ireland | 76-79-78-77=310 | +22 |
