= Bill Ackland-Horman =

Australian amateur golfer (1914–1979)

Personal information
- Full name: William Dinwoodie Ackland-Horman
- Nationality: Australia
- Born: 4 January 1914 Adelaide, South Australia
- Died: 19 November 1979 (aged 65) Melbourne, Victoria, Australia

Career
- Sport: Golf
- Status: Amateur

William Dinwoodie Ackland-Horman (4 January 1914 – 19 November 1979) was an Australian amateur golfer. He won the 1949 Australian Amateur, becoming the first South Australian-born player to win the title.

== Early life ==
Ackland-Horman was born in Adelaide on 4 January 1914. He was the son of William Dinwoodie Ackland-Horman, who was born in Scotland and was an engineer and surveyor for Lloyd's Register of Shipping. Ackland-Horman was medical doctor.

== Golf career ==
Ackland-Horman first came to notice in 1933 when he lost to Fergus McMahon in a playoff for the South Australian Close Championship and then won the South Australian Amateur Championship, beating Bill Rymill 4&3 in the final. He won the Australian Universities championship four times in succession, from 1936 to 1939.

After World War II, Ackland-Horman won the South Australian Close Championship three times, in 1946, 1947 and 1949. His biggest success came later in 1949, at Royal Sydney, when he beat Bill Edgar at the 38th hole to win the Australian Amateur, becoming the first South Australian-born player to win the title. He had beaten fellow South Australian Bob Stevens in the semi-final.

At the end of 1952 Ackland-Horman was in the Australian team to tour New Zealand, playing in a number of events including the Sloan Morpeth Trophy. He won the South Australian Amateur Championship again, in 1952 and 1955.

== Later life ==
In 1945 Ackland-Horman was sentenced to three months in prison, after he was convicted of causing death by dangerous driver. He was involved in an accident in which a 16-year-old cyclist died. His only son and his son's wife died in a road-traffic accident in 1968, when their car was in a collision with a semi-trailer as they were returning to Adelaide from their honeymoon. Ackland-Horman died suddenly on 19 November 1979, in Melbourne where he had been attending the Australian Open.

== Tournament wins ==
- 1933 South Australian Amateur Championship
- 1946 South Australian Close Championship
- 1947 South Australian Close Championship
- 1949 South Australian Close Championship, Australian Amateur
- 1952 South Australian Amateur Championship
- 1955 South Australian Amateur Championship

== Team appearances ==
- Sloan Morpeth Trophy (representing Australia): 1952 (tied)
- Australian Men's Interstate Teams Matches (representing South Australia): 1932, 1935 (winners), 1937, 1938 (winners), 1939, 1947, 1948, 1949, 1950, 1951, 1952, 1953, 1954, 1955, 1956, 1957, 1958, 1959, 1962 (joint winners)
