= Scott Sterling (golfer) =

American professional golfer (born 1972)

Personal information
- Nationality: United States
- Born: February 2, 1972 (age 54) Beaumont, Texas, U.S.
- Height: 5 ft 9 in (1.75 m)
- Weight: 150 lb (68 kg; 11 st)

Career
- Sport: Golf
- College: Louisiana State University
- Turned professional: 1995
- Former tours: PGA Tour; Nationwide Tour; NGA Hooters Tour
- Professional wins: 2

Number of wins by tour
- PGA Tour of Australasia: 1
- Korn Ferry Tour: 1
- Other: 1

Best results in major championships
- Masters Tournament: DNP
- PGA Championship: DNP
- U.S. Open: CUT: 2008
- The Open Championship: DNP

Scott Sterling (born February 2, 1972) is an American professional golfer.

== Early life and amateur career ==
Sterling was born in Beaumont, Texas. He played college golf at Louisiana State University where he was an All-American in 1994.

== Professional career ==
In 1995, Sterling turned professional. In 1999, Sterling started playing on the Nike Tour. He did not have much success and returned to the minitours, playing on the NGA Hooters Tour, winning the 2001 NGA Hooters Tour Championship.

In 2002, Sterling returned to the PGA Tour's developmental tour. In 2007, he won the Jacob's Creek Open Championship, an event in Australia, co-sanctioned by the Nationwide Tour and the PGA Tour of Australasia. He received a promotion to the PGA Tour where his best finish was a T-6 at the 2008 Children's Miracle Network Classic.

== Professional wins (2) ==
=== Nationwide Tour wins (1) ===
No.	Date	Tournament	Winning score	Margin of victory	Runner-up
1	Feb 18, 2007	Jacob's Creek Open Championship^{1}	−12 (70-69-66-71=276)	1 stroke	(Australia) David Lutterus

^{1}Co-sanctioned by the PGA Tour of Australasia

=== NGA Hooters Tour wins (1) ===
No.	Date	Tournament	Winning score	Margin of victory	Runner-up
1	Sep 30, 2001	Tour Championship	−16 (68-69-68-67=272)	1 stroke	(United States) Peter Dyson

== See also ==
- 2007 Nationwide Tour graduates
