= William Bailey (cricketer, born 1898) =

Australian cricketer (1898–1983)

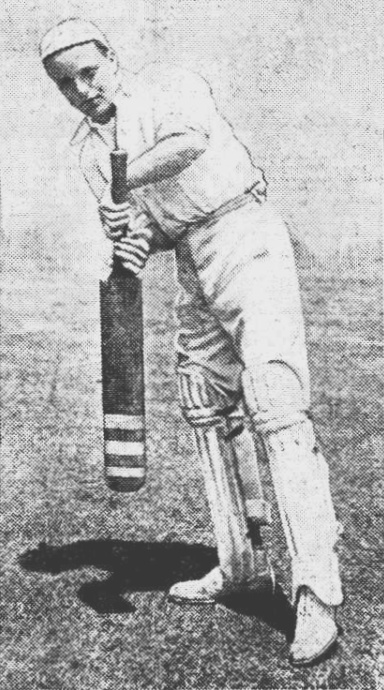

Personal information
- Born: 20 July 1898; Condobolin, Australia
- Died: 27 February 1983 (aged 84); Geelong, Australia

Domestic team information
- Years: Team
- 1923-1927: Victoria
- Source: Cricinfo, 20 November 2015

William Bailey (20 July 1898 – 27 February 1983) was an Australian cricketer. He played three first-class cricket matches for Victoria between 1923 and 1927.

He began his cricket career while at Geelong Grammar School, captaining the side by 1917, and then played for the University XI in district cricket where he became known as a dashing batsman. He also became a notable golfer by the mid-1920's.

== See also ==
- List of Victoria first-class cricketers
