= Craig Warren =

Australian professional golfer

Personal information
- Nationality: Australia
- Born: 8 March 1964 (age 62)
- Height: 1.91 m (6 ft 3 in)
- Weight: 80 kg (180 lb; 13 st)
- Children: 2

Career
- Sport: Golf
- Status: Professional
- Former tour: Japan Golf Tour
- Professional wins: 1

Number of wins by tour
- Japan Golf Tour: 1

Craig Warren (born 8 March 1964) is an Australian professional golfer.

== Professional career ==
Warren played on the Japan Golf Tour, winning once.

Warren worked in golf services at Sanctuary Cove on the Gold Coast.

== Professional wins (1) ==
=== PGA of Japan Tour wins (1) ===
No.	Date	Tournament	Winning score	Margin of victory	Runner-up
1	13 Mar 1994	Token Cup	−8 (70-68-70=208) (Note: Shortened to 54 holes due to weather.)	1 stroke	(Japan) Masashi Ozaki

== Team appearances ==
Amateur

- Australian Men's Interstate Teams Matches (representing New South Wales): 1984, 1985 (winners), 1986
