= Felix Headlam =

Australian cricketer

Personal information
- Born: 20 June 1897; Bothwell, Tasmania, Australia
- Died: 5 October 1965 (aged 68); Bothwell, Tasmania, Australia

Domestic team information
- Years: Team
- 1913-1915: Tasmania
- Source: Cricinfo, 24 January 2016

Felix Headlam (20 June 1897 – 5 October 1965) was an Australian cricketer. He played two first-class matches for Tasmania between 1913 and 1915.

== See also ==
- List of Tasmanian representative cricketers
