= Peter Toogood =

Australian amateur golfer (1930–2019)

Personal information
- Full name: Peter Alfred Toogood
- Nationality: Australia
- Born: 11 April 1930 North Adelaide, South Australia
- Died: 5 June 2019 (aged 89) Tasmania

Career
- Sport: Golf
- Status: Amateur

Best results in major championships
- Masters Tournament: DNP
- PGA Championship: DNP
- U.S. Open: DNP
- The Open Championship: T15: 1954

Peter Alfred Toogood, AM, MBE (11 April 1930 – 5 June 2019) was an Australian amateur golfer from Tasmania. He won the Australian Amateur in 1954 and the Tasmanian Open eight times. He was the leading amateur in the 1954 Open Championship and was part of the team that won the inaugural Eisenhower Trophy in 1958.

== Early life ==
His father, Alf Toogood, son of Alfred Toogood, Sr., was born in England in 1895 and had arrived in Australia in about 1919. He was also the grandson of Alfred Toogood, Sr.

Toogood was born in North Adelaide, South Australia on 11 April 1930. His father, Alf Toogood, had recently been appointed professional at The Grange Golf Club in Adelaide. In 1936, when Toogood was six, the family moved from Tasmania to South Australia so his father could become a professional at Kingston Beach Club. As an 8-year-old he made a hole-in-one at the 7th hole at Kingston Beach.

== Golf career ==
Toogood was the leading amateur in the 1950, 1952, 1955, and 1957 Australian Opens, and in 1954 was leading amateur in The Open Championship. Earlier in 1954 he reached the last-16 of the Amateur Championship before losing to Joe Carr at the 20th hole. He defeated his brother John in the final of the 1954 Australian Amateur, leading to the famous headline "Toogood Was Too Good For Toogood". He was selected in 1958 for Australia's team for the first Eisenhower Trophy at St Andrews, where they beat the United States by two strokes in a playoff. His third round of 71 was the only sub-par round of the competition.

Toogood won the Tasmanian Open eight times: in 1949, 1951, and six years in succession from 1954 to 1959. He also won the New Zealand Amateur in 1956, beating Bob Charles 3&2 in the 36-hole final.

== Personal life ==
His father won two Tasmanian Opens, in 1938 and 1950. Peter Toogood finished runner-up behind his father in the 1950 event.

== Awards and honors ==
- In 1980, Toogood was awarded the Member of the Most Excellent Order of the British Empire
- In 1993, the Australasian Golf Museum, located at Bothwell, Tasmania, was founded in his memory
- In 2006, Toogood was appointed Member of the Order of Australia

== Team appearances ==
- Eisenhower Trophy (representing Australia): 1958 (winners)
- Commonwealth Tournament (representing Australia): 1959
- Sloan Morpeth Trophy (representing Australia): 1956 (winners), 1969 (winners)
- Australian Men's Interstate Teams Matches (representing Tasmania): 1948, 1949, 1950, 1951, 1952, 1954, 1955, 1956, 1957, 1958, 1959, 1960, 1962, 1964, 1966, 1967, 1968 (winners), 1969, 1970, 1971, 1972, 1973, 1974 (winners), 1976, 1977 (winners), 1978, 1979, 1980
