= Michael Leedham =

Australian cricketer (born 1950)

Personal information
- Born: 22 February 1950 (age 76); Campbell Town, Tasmania, Australia

Domestic team information
- Years: Team
- 1973-1982: Tasmania
- Source: Cricinfo, 13 March 2016

Michael Leedham (born 22 February 1950) is an Australian former cricketer. He played three first-class matches for Tasmania between 1973 and 1982.

== See also ==
- List of Tasmanian representative cricketers
