= John Wilkin (cricketer) =

Australian cricketer

Personal information
- Born: 28 April 1924; Adelaide, Australia
- Died: 27 December 2017 (aged 93)
- Source: Cricinfo, 30 September 2020

John Wilkin (28 April 1924 – 27 December 2017) was an Australian cricketer. He played in one first-class match for South Australia in 1949/50.

== See also ==
- List of South Australian representative cricketers
