= Glenelg Golf Club =

Private golf club in Adelaide

- Interactive map of Glenelg Golf Club
- 34.961°S 138.527°E

Club information
- Location: Adelaide, Australia
- Established: 1927; 99 years ago
- Type: Private
- Tota holes: 18
- Tournaments: SA Open, Australian Amateur Championships
- Website: www.glenelggolf.com
- Designed by: Herbert 'Cargie' Rymill (1927), Vern Morcom (1954), Neil Crafter/Bob Tuohy (1998)
- Par: 71
- Length: 6,267 metres
- Course rating: 74
- Course record: 64 Brett Drewitt (Men), 65 Minjee Lee (Women)

Glenelg Golf Club is a private golf club located in the Adelaide suburb of Novar Gardens, also near the seaside suburb of Glenelg. It is located adjacent the southern boundary of Adelaide International Airport and within easy access of the Adelaide CBD.

In January 2016 the course was ranked 25th among the top 100 Australian courses by Golf Australia Magazine.

The 18-hole golf course is a par 71 and measures 6,267 metres. It possesses couch grass fairways, bent grass greens, and revetted-edge style bunkering. It is reminiscent of the traditional Scottish links courses.

Glenelg has played host to numerous state and national championships, including the South Australian Open. It also hosted the 1986 Australian Amateur and co-hosted qualifying for the 2004 Australian Amateur with Royal Adelaide Golf Club.

== Course scorecard ==
Glenelg Golf Club
Tee	Rating/Slope	1	2	3	4	5	6	7	8	9	Out	10	11	12	13	14	15	16	17	18	In	Total
Par		4	4	3	4	5	4	4	4	4	36	4	3	5	4	3	4	3	4	5	35	71
Black Tees	74	301	418	202	315	490	430	394	407	376	3,333	382	168	460	369	164	365	144	386	496	2,934	6,267
Blue Tees	72	301	410	178	296	490	400	394	384	376	3,229	366	168	460	349	164	347	144	368	496	2,862	6,091
Par		4	5	3	4	5	5	4	5	4	39	4	3	5	4	3	4	3	4	5	35	74
Red Tees	75	289	410	140	275	443	400	349	370	310	2,986	325	135	430	318	121	324	120	340	430	2,543	5,529

== Tournaments hosted ==
- 2004 Australian Amateur qualifying (with Royal Adelaide Golf Club)
- 1986 Australian Amateur
- 1981 South Australian Open
- 1979 South Australian Open
- 1978 South Australian Open
- 1974 South Australian Open
- 1970 South Australian Open
- 1967 South Australian Open
- 1963 South Australian Open
