= Chen Chien-chin =

Taiwanese professional golfer

Personal information
- Nationality: Taiwan
- Born: 19 June 1940 (age 86)
- Height: 1.70 m (5 ft 7 in)
- Weight: 62 kg (137 lb; 9.8 st)

Career
- Sport: Golf
- Status: Professional
- Former tour: Japan Golf Tour
- Professional wins: 2

Number of wins by tour
- Japan Golf Tour: 1
- Other: 1

Chen Chien-chin (born 19 June 1940) is a Taiwanese professional golfer.

== Professional career ==
Chen played on the Japan Golf Tour, winning once.

== Professional wins (2) ==
=== PGA of Japan Tour wins (1) ===
- 1976 Chubu Open

=== Other wins (1) ===
- 1967 Okinawa Open (as an amateur)

== Team appearances ==
Amateur

- Eisenhower Trophy (representing Taiwan): 1960, 1962, 1964, 1966, 1968, 1970, 1972
