= Jarrod Lyle =

Australian professional golfer (1981–2018)

Personal information
- Nationality: Australia
- Born: 21 August 1981 Shepparton, Victoria, Australia
- Died: 8 August 2018 (aged 36) Torquay, Victoria, Australia
- Height: 6 ft 2 in (1.88 m)
- Weight: 235 lb (107 kg; 16.8 st)
- Spouse: Briony Harper (m. 2011)
- Children: 2

Career
- Sport: Golf
- Turned professional: 2004
- Former tours: PGA Tour; PGA Tour of Australasia; Nationwide Tour
- Professional wins: 2

Number of wins by tour
- Korn Ferry Tour: 2

Best results in major championships
- Masters Tournament: DNP
- PGA Championship: DNP
- U.S. Open: T48: 2008
- The Open Championship: CUT: 2006

Achievements and awards
- PGA Tour Courage Award: 2014–15

Jarrod Lyle (21 August 1981 – 8 August 2018) was an Australian professional golfer. He won twice on the 2008 Nationwide Tour. He played a number of seasons on the PGA Tour; his best finish being tied for 4th place in the 2012 Northern Trust Open. Soon after this performance, Lyle was diagnosed with a recurrence of leukemia, with which he was diagnosed as a teenager. Subsequent treatment limited his playing time and in July 2018, Lyle decided to stop treatment. Lyle died on 8 August 2018 at the age of 36.

== Early life ==
Lyle was born in Shepparton, Victoria, Australia. He got his start in golf at age six when he caddied for his father.

At the age of 17, Lyle was diagnosed with acute myeloid leukemia and was confined to his bed for nine months while undergoing chemotherapy treatments at the Royal Children's Hospital. It took another 12 months before he had the energy to walk a golf course again. He began a friendship during that time with PGA Tour member and fellow Australian Robert Allenby. He was diagnosed with a recurrence of the disease in March 2012.

== Professional career ==
Lyle turned professional in 2004. He played a number of tournaments on the 2005 Asian Tour and was runner-up twice, in the Macau Open and the Brunei Open. He was runner-up in the 2006 ING New Zealand PGA Championship, an early season event co-sanctioned by the Nationwide Tour. He played on the remainder of 2006 Nationwide Tour and finished 18th on the money list and earning his PGA Tour card for 2007. He made only three top-25 finishes on the PGA Tour in 2007 and finished 164th on the money list and lost his Tour card. Back on the Nationwide Tour in 2008, he won twice, at the Mexican Open and the Knoxville Open, and was runner-up in the Xerox Classic. He finished 4th on the money list and earned his 2009 PGA Tour card.

2009 was another disappointing season on the PGA Tour, his only top-10 finish being in the Mayakoba Golf Classic at Riviera Maya-Cancun, an alternate event on the tour. In 2010 Lyle played tournaments on the PGA Tour and the Nationwide Tour but finished 5th in the 2010 Q-School to earn his full card on the PGA Tour for 2011. Lyle scored a hole-in-one at the Waste Management Phoenix Open in 2011 on the par-3 16th 'Stadium Hole' winning $25,000 for a charity of his choice. This was the first hole-in-one on the 16th in the Phoenix Open for nine years. He regained his card with another good performance in the Q-School and played on the PGA Tour again 2012. He had his best finish in a PGA Tour event in February 2012 when he tied for 4th place in the Northern Trust Open. The following week, in the Mayakoba Golf Classic he was infected by an insect bite. Subsequent tests resulted in the diagnosis of the recurrence of leukemia.

After his second remission, Lyle made his return to competition at the Talisker Masters in late 2013 and made the cut. In 2014, he played his first PGA Tour-sanctioned round in 29 months at the Web.com Tour's Midwest Classic and finished T11. Once Lyle made his allotted rehab Web.com Tour starts, he was able to return to the PGA Tour where he had 20 starts and had to earn $283,825 to match Kevin Chappell, the golfer who finished 125th on the 2012 PGA Tour money list. Lyle made his first PGA Tour start since 2012 after Monday qualifying for the Frys.com Open in October 2014, where he made the cut and finished T31. Lyle was unable to meet the terms of his medical exemption and his leukemia returned in July 2017.

== Personal life ==
Lyle married his long-time partner Briony Harper in December 2011. They had two daughters.

== Death ==
In July 2017, Lyle began treatment for another recurrence of the leukemia, but a year later decided to end treatment and begin palliative care. He died on 8 August 2018, at age 36.

In 2021, the PGA Tour of Australasia added the TPS Murray River to their schedule as part of The Players Series. The tournament was played at Cobram Barooga Golf Club, near his home town, being named in memorial of Lyle.

== Amateur wins ==
- 2003 Lake Macquarie Amateur
- 2004 Lake Macquarie Amateur

== Professional wins (2) ==
=== Nationwide Tour wins (2) ===
No.	Date	Tournament	Winning score	Margin of victory	Runner-up
1	3 Feb 2008	Mexico Open	−17 (68-69-67-63=267)	4 strokes	(United States) Matt Every
2	22 Jun 2008	Knoxville Open	−19 (68-66-69-66=269)	Playoff	(United States) Chris Kirk

Nationwide Tour playoff record (1–0)

No.	Year	Tournament	Opponent	Result
1	2008	Knoxville Open	(United States) Chris Kirk	Won with birdie on first extra hole

== Results in major championships ==
Tournament	2006	2007	2008
U.S. Open			T48
The Open Championship	CUT		

Did not play

CUT = missed the half-way cut
"T" = tied
Note: Lyle never played in the Masters Tournament or the PGA Championship.

== Team appearances ==
Amateur

- Eisenhower Trophy (representing Australia): 2004
- Australian Men's Interstate Teams Matches (representing Victoria): 2002, 2003 (winners), 2004

== See also ==
- 2006 Nationwide Tour graduates
- 2008 Nationwide Tour graduates
- 2010 PGA Tour Qualifying School graduates
- 2011 PGA Tour Qualifying School graduates
