= 1968 Eisenhower Trophy =

Coordinates: 37.968°S 145.025°E

Tournament information
- Dates: 9–12 October
- Location: Black Rock, Victoria, Australia
- Course: Royal Melbourne Golf Club
- Format: 72 holes stroke play

Statistics
- Par: 73
- Length: 6,946 yards (6,351 m)
- Field: 26 teams 103 players

Champion
- United States; Bruce Fleisher, Vinny Giles, Jack Lewis Jr. & Dick Siderowf
- 868 (−8)

Location map
- Location in Australia Location in Victoria Location in greater Melbourne

The 1968 Eisenhower Trophy took place 9 to 12 October at the Royal Melbourne Golf Club in Black Rock, Victoria, Australia. It was the sixth World Amateur Team Championship for the Eisenhower Trophy. The tournament was a 72-hole stroke play team event with 26 four-man teams. The best three scores for each round counted towards the team total.

The United States won the Eisenhower Trophy for the third time, finishing a strokes ahead of the silver medalists, Great Britain and Ireland. Canada took the bronze medal while Australia finished fourth. Michael Bonallack and Vinny Giles had the lowest individual scores, six-under-par 286.

Great Britain and Ireland led by 7 strokes after three rounds but the Americans scored 73, 73 and 75 in the final round to Great Britain and Irelands 76, 76, and 77 to win by a stroke. At the last hole, Ronnie Shade missed a 6-foot putt, after which Dick Siderowf holed from 3 feet to give the United States the victory.

== Teams ==
26 teams contested the event. Each team had four players with the exception of Venuezela who were represented by only three players.

Country	Players
Argentina	Jorge de Azcuenaga, Jorge C. Ledesma, Roberto Monguzzi, Alberto E. Texier
Australia	Harry Berwick, Kevin Donohoe, Tony Gresham, Kevin Hartley
Bermuda	Brendam Ingham, Lois Moniz, Llewellyn Tucker, George E. Wardman
Brazil	Robert Falkenburg, Robert Falkenburg II, Lee Smith, Carlos A. Sozio
Canada	Gary Cowan, Jim Doyle, John Johnston, Bob Wylie
Chile	Guy Barroilhet, Francisco Condon, Mauricio Galeno, Eric van der Valk
Republic of China	Chen Chien-chin, Ho Ming-chung, Hsu Sheng-san, Shay Yee-shone
France	Didier Charmat, Herve Frayssineau, Alex Godillot, Gaëtan Mourgue D'Algue
Great Britain & Ireland	Michael Bonallack, Gordon Cosh, Peter Oosterhuis, Ronnie Shade
Hong Kong	K.G. Finlayson, C.R. Cribben, A.W.J. Kim Hall, J.D. Mackie
India	Vikram Chopra, Ashok S. Malik, R.K. Pitamber, P. G. Sethi
Italy	Franco Bevione, Stefano Cimatti, Angelo Croce, Alberto Schiaffino, Lorenzo Silva
Japan	Shoichiro Maeda, Shinji Morikawa, Ginjiro Nakabe, Kenichi Yamada
Libya	Milad Gamudi, Abdul Afi Sadek, Hadi Sasi, Abdalla Zguzi
Malaysia	Zainal Abidin, Kwan C. Choo, Darwis Deren, Jalal Deran
Mexico	Juan Antonio Estrada, Tomás Lehmann, Ernesto Perez Acosta, Victor Regalado
New Zealand	John Durry, Ted McDougall, Ross Murray, Bruce Stevens
Papua New Guinea	Wayne Brittain, John Keating, Ian Trevena, John Wilkinson
Philippines	Emil G. Gaston, Nini Lizares, José M. Santos, Luis F. Silverio
South Africa	Hugh Baiocchi, Comrie du Toit, John Fourie, Dave Symons
South Korea	Yuong Chang Kim, Kyo Won Lee, Moon Koo Lee, Yung Jun Park
Spain	Santiago Fernandez, José Gancedo, Alvaro Muro, Roman Taya
Switzerland	Gilles Bagnoud, Peter Gutermann, Anton Matti, Peter Müller
United States	Bruce Fleisher, Vinny Giles, Jack Lewis Jr., Dick Siderowf
Venezuela	Gustavo Kalen, Carlos Raza, Rafael Vaamonde
West Germany	Walter Brühne, Gerhard Koenig, Christian Strenger, Jürgen Weghmann

== Scores ==
Place	Country	Score	To par
1st place, gold medalist(s)	United States	220-211-216-221=868	−8
2nd place, silver medalist(s)	Great Britain & Ireland	218-215-207-229=869	−7
3rd place, bronze medalist(s)	Canada	225-215-222-223=885	+9
4	Australia	216-222-222-226=886	+10
5	South Africa	225-218-220-226=889	+13
6	Mexico	222-211-232-228=893	+17
7	New Zealand	224-223-223-225=895	+19
8	Chinese Taipei	226-224-223-227=900	+24
9	Japan	228-219-227-234=908	+32
10	West Germany	229-229-224-228=910	+34
11	France	227-229-223-233=912	+36
12	Argentina	226-221-233-236=916	+40
13	India	231-222-233-239=925	+49
14	Malaysia	239-224-233-234=930	+54
15	Spain	232-232-236-239=939	+63
16	Italy	230-242-229-246=947	+71
17	Philippines	236-233-233-248=950	+74
18	Switzerland	234-233-242-245=954	+78
19	South Korea	238-230-245-243=956	+80
20	Papua New Guinea	243-235-241-239=958	+82
21	Bermuda	241-244-237-249=971	+95
22	Brazil	257-239-239-241=976	+100
23	Hong Kong	250-244-246-241=981	+105
24	Chile	247-243-248-245=983	+107
25	Libya	264-249-251-257=1021	+145
26	Venezuela	261-276-263-267=1067	+191

== Individual leaders ==
There was no official recognition for the lowest individual scores.

Place	Player	Country	Score	To par
T1	Michael Bonallack	Great Britain & Ireland	72-72-66-76=286	−6
T1	Vinny Giles	United States	74-68-71-73=286	−6
T3	Peter Oosterhuis	Great Britain & Ireland	70-71-72-76=289	−3
T3	Dick Siderowf	United States	74-69-73-73=289	−3
T5	Kevin Donohoe	Australia	68-75-72-76=291	−1
T5	Ernesto Perez Acosta	Mexico	72-69-72-78=291	−1
7	Gary Cowan	Canada	73-69-72-79=293	+1
8	Ross Murray	New Zealand	75-74-72-73=294	+2
9	Ronnie Shade	Great Britain & Ireland	76-72-70-77=295	+3
T10	Ho Ming-chung	Chinese Taipei	75-74-72-75=296	+4
T10	Jack Lewis Jr.	United States	72-74-72-78=296	+4
T10	Ginjiro Nakabe	Japan	76-73-71-76=296	+4
