= Thomas McKay (Australian politician) =

Politician, golfer and barrister in New South Wales, Australia

member of the New South Wales Legislative Council
- In office 1966–1978

Chairman of Committees
- In office 1969–1978

Personal details
- Born: 1 October 1909 Mosman, New South Wales, Australia
- Died: 5 January 2004 (aged 94) Exeter, New South Wales, Australia
- Party: Liberal
- Spouse(s): Odette Anita Madeline Lefebvre; Peggy Burleigh
- Children: 3
- Education: University of Sydney
- Occupation: barrister

Military service
- Branch/service: Royal Australian Air Force
- Rank: wing commander
- Golf career
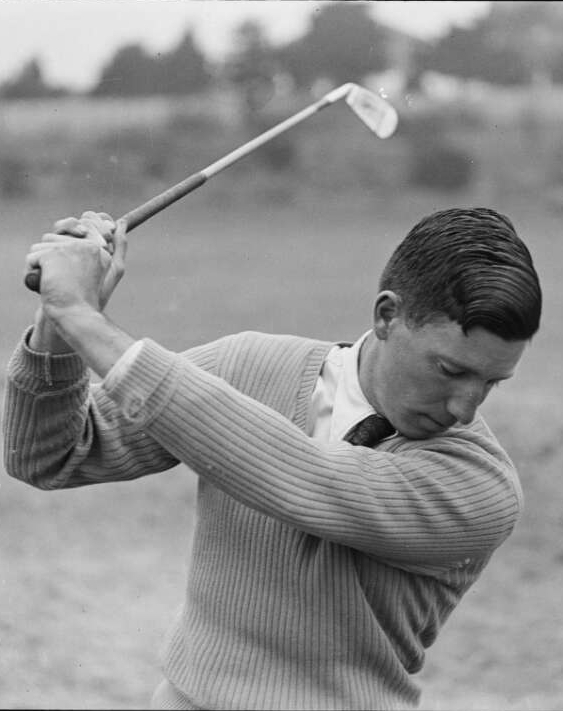
- Sport: Golf
- Professional wins: Australian Amateur (1934); New South Wales Amateur Championship (1936)

Thomas Sidney McKay (1 October 1909 – 5 January 2004) was an Australian golfer, barrister and politician.

== Early life ==
McKay was born in Mosman to journalist Claude Eric Ferguson McKay and Dorothy Hope née Sidney. He went to the Shore School before studying at the University of Sydney where he graduated with a Bachelor of Arts in 1931 and a Bachelor of Laws in 1934. He was an amateur golfer and on 2 August 1934 he married Odette Anita Madeline Lefebvre, who was also a golf champion, having won the NSW State championship in 1931 and 1933. They had two children before divorcing in 1946. He married a second time to Peggy Burleigh on 28 October 1949, and they had a daughter.

== Golfing career ==
He was a member of the successful NSW golf team in the Men's Interstate Teams Matches in 1932, 1934, and 1937, and runners-up in 1935. He won his first major golf title in October 1934, the Australian Amateur at Royal Sydney. He won the New South Wales Amateur Championship in July 1936 at The Australian, and in 1937 he was runner-up to professional George Naismith at the Australian Open at The Australian. In 1938 McKay travelled to Britain as part of a four-man Australian team which included Harry Hattersley, Len Nettlefold and Mick Ryan. The team arrived in mid-May and played in The Amateur Championship at Troon. McKay won in the first two rounds, before being defeated in the third. The team played various matches in Britain, including at Stoke Poges where McKay hit a course record 66. He qualified for the 1938 Open Championship at Royal St George's, but in the first round he hit a disastrous 14 on the 14th hole, which put him out of contention for making the cut.

== Barrister and farmer ==
He was called to the bar in 1934, and retired from championship golf at the end of 1938 to concentrate on his practice as a barrister. From 1940 to 1945 he served in the Royal Australian Air Force, achieving the rank of wing commander. He was a prosecutor at the Rabaul war crimes trial in 1947. From 1950 to 1960 he was a dairy farmer around Berrima, and he served on Wingecarribee Shire Council from 1950 to 1953. He returned to legal practice in 1960 at Moss Vale.

== Political career ==
In 1966, he was elected as a Liberal member of the New South Wales Legislative Council. He was re-elected in 1967, and in 1969 was elected Chairman of Committees, serving until 1978 when he did not seek re-election.

== Later life and death ==
McKay died at Exeter on 5 January 2004 (aged 94).

New South Wales Legislative Council
Preceded by Stanley Eskell	Chairman of Committees; 1969–1978	Succeeded by Clive Healey
