= Steven Conran =

Australian professional golfer

Personal information
- Full name: Steven James Conran
- Nationality: Australia
- Born: 12 May 1966 (age 60) Lithgow, New South Wales, Australia
- Height: 1.70 m (5 ft 7 in)
- Weight: 62 kg (137 lb; 9.8 st)

Career
- Sport: Golf
- Turned professional: 1990
- Former tours: Japan Golf Tour; PGA Tour of Australasia
- Professional wins: 4
- Highest ranking: 94 (22 May 2005)

Number of wins by tour
- Japan Golf Tour: 1
- PGA Tour of Australasia: 1
- Other: 2

Best results in major championships
- Masters Tournament: DNP
- PGA Championship: DNP
- U.S. Open: CUT: 2005
- The Open Championship: DNP

Steven James Conran (born 12 May 1966) is an Australian professional golfer, who played on the Japan Golf Tour and the PGA Tour of Australasia.

== Professional career ==
Conran won four times during his career; including the Epson Singapore Open in 1995 and the Hisamitsu-KBC Augusta in 2004.

== Amateur wins ==
- 1989 Australian Amateur
- 1990 New South Wales Medal (tied with Matthew Ecob), New South Wales Amateur

== Professional wins (4) ==
=== Japan Golf Tour wins (1) ===
No.	Date	Tournament	Winning score	Margin of victory	Runners-up
1	29 Aug 2004	Hisamitsu-KBC Augusta	−7 (68-70-70-69=277)	1 stroke	(Japan) Takashi Kamiyama, (Japan) Toru Taniguchi

Japan Golf Tour playoff record (0–1)

No.	Year	Tournament	Opponent	Result
1	2005	The Crowns	(Japan) Naomichi Ozaki	Lost to par on second extra hole

=== PGA Tour of Australasia wins (1) ===
No.	Date	Tournament	Winning score	Margin of victory	Runner-up
1	12 Nov 1995	Epson Singapore Open	−14 (70-68-66-66=270)	3 strokes	(Australia) Andrew Bonhomme

=== Other wins (2) ===
- 1993 Nedlands Masters
- 1995 Vanuatu Open

== Results in major championships ==
Tournament	2005
U.S. Open	CUT

CUT = missed the halfway cut
Note: Conran only played in the U.S. Open.

== Team appearances ==
Amateur

- Sloan Morpeth Trophy (representing Australia): 1990 (winners)
- Australian Men's Interstate Teams Matches (representing New South Wales): 1988, 1990 (winners)
