= Phil Billings =

Australian golfer (born 1939)

Personal information
- Full name: Phillip K. Billings
- Nationality: Australia
- Born: 1939 (age 86–87) Belmont, New South Wales, Australia

Career
- Sport: Golf
- Status: Amateur

Phillip K. Billings (born 1939) is a former Australian amateur golfer.

== Golfing career ==
He was part of the winning Australian team at the 1966 Eisenhower Trophy in Mexico City. As national captain, he led his country to a tie with Great Britain at the Commonwealth Tournament in 1963. He has won the Lake Macquarie Amateur the most times, winning on seven occasions (1959, 1960, 1961, 1964, 1965, 1966, 1974). He was the medallist in the 1961 Australian Amateur and won the New South Wales Amateur the same year.

Billings also competed in professional events. He won the 1961 Lakes Open and was a runner-up in the 1971 New South Wales Open.

== Personal life ==
For his career, Billings worked as a schoolteacher.

== Tournament wins ==
- 1959 Lake Macquarie Amateur
- 1960 Lake Macquarie Amateur
- 1961 New South Wales Amateur Championship, Lake Macquarie Amateur, Lakes Open
- 1964 Lake Macquarie Amateur
- 1965 Lake Macquarie Amateur
- 1966 Lake Macquarie Amateur
- 1974 Lake Macquarie Amateur

== Team appearances ==
- Eisenhower Trophy (representing Australia): 1962, 1964, 1966 (winners)
- Commonwealth Tournament (representing Australia): 1963 (joint winners), 1967
- Sloan Morpeth Trophy (representing Australia): 1961, 1964 (winners), 1965, 1966 (winners), 1967 (winners)
- Australian Men's Interstate Teams Matches (representing New South Wales): 1957 (winners), 1958 (winners), 1959 (winners), 1960 (winners), 1961, 1962 (joint winners), 1963, 1964 (winners), 1965 (winners), 1967 (winners), 1968, 1969 (winners), 1970 (winners), 1971, 1972 (winners), 1974, 1982
