= Sloan Morpeth Trophy =

The Sloan Morpeth Trophy was an amateur team golf tournament, played between Australia and New Zealand. It was contested irregularly from 1947 to 2016. The trophy was presented by Sloan Morpeth in 1956. From 1993 to 2005 the two countries played each other as part of the Four Nations Team Championship, a competition which also involved Canada and Japan, while from 2007 to 2012 it was played as part of the Trans Tasman Cup. In 2016 the trophy was contested using scores from the two qualifying rounds of the Australian Amateur.

== Format ==
Except for the final event in 2016, the tournament was match-play. The size of the teams and the format varied but consisted of a combination of foursomes and singles matches. In 2016 the teams had four players with the best three scores from two stroke-play rounds counting towards the team total.

== Results ==
Year	Venue	Winning team	Score		Losing team	Ref
1947	Wellington Golf Club	Tied	3	3		
1948	Royal Melbourne Golf Club	New Zealand	4½	1½	Australia	
1952	Christchurch Golf Club	Tied	3	3		
1953	The Australian Golf Club	Australia	5	1	New Zealand	
1956	Wanganui Golf Club	Australia	3½	2½	New Zealand	
1961	Kingston Heath Golf Club	New Zealand	5½	3½	Australia	
1964	Pennant Hills Golf Club	Australia	5½	½	New Zealand	
1965	Christchurch Golf Club	New Zealand	5½	3½	Australia	
1966	Manukau Golf Club	Australia	6	0	New Zealand	
1967	Hamilton Golf Club	Australia	5	4	New Zealand	
1969	The Grange Golf Club	Australia	7	5	New Zealand	
1976	Muriwai Golf Club	New Zealand	3½	2½	Australia	
1977	Victoria Golf Club	Australia	4	2	New Zealand	
1980	Muriwai Golf Club	New Zealand	7½	2½	Australia	
1982	Manawatu Golf Club	Tied	5	5		
1983	Commonwealth Golf Club	Australia	9	3	New Zealand	
1984	St. Clair Golf Club	New Zealand	8½	3½	Australia	
1986	Hutt Golf Club	Australia	7½	4½	New Zealand	
1987	Royal Hobart Golf Club	New Zealand	10½	1½	Australia	
1988	North Shore Golf Club	Australia	7	5	New Zealand	
1990	Sanctuary Cove Golf Club	Australia	9	3	New Zealand	
1991	Hastings Golf Club	Australia	7	5	New Zealand	
1992	Russley Golf Club	New Zealand	12	6	Australia	
2007	Royal Canberra Golf Club	New Zealand	8	4	Australia	
2008	Royal Wellington Golf Club	Australia	5½	4½	New Zealand	
2009	Royal Canberra Golf Club	Australia	8	4	New Zealand	
2010	Royal Wellington Golf Club	Australia	7½	4½	New Zealand	
2012	Peninsula Golf Club	New Zealand	6½	5½	Australia	
2016	Metropolitan Golf Club & Peninsula Kingswood CGC	Australia	436	446	New Zealand	

== Teams ==
=== Australia ===
- 1947 Bob Brown, Alex Colledge, Bill Edgar, Keith Pix
- 1948 Doug Bachli, Bill Edgar, Harry Hattersley, Alan Waterson
- 1952 Bill Ackland-Horman, Harry Berwick, Jack Coogan, Bob Stevens
- 1953 Harry Berwick, Jack Coogan, Peter Heard, Bob Stevens
- 1956 Harry Berwick, Bill Edgar, Justin Seward, Peter Toogood
- 1961 Phil Billings, Vic Bulgin, Tom Crow, John Hood, Eric Routley, Bob Stevens
- 1964 Barrie Baker, Phil Billings, Tom Crow, Kevin Hartley
- 1965 Dennis Bell, Phil Billings, Tom Crow, Kevin Donohoe, Kevin Hartley, Neil Titheridge
- 1966 Harry Berwick, Phil Billings, Kevin Donohoe, Kevin Hartley
- 1967 Dennis Bell, Phil Billings, Bill Britten, Vic Bulgin, Kevin Donohoe, Kevin Hartley
- 1969 Barry Burgess, Kevin Donohoe, Terry Gale, Tony Gresham, Kevin Hartley, Sommie Mackay, Jack Newton, Peter Toogood
- 1976 Chris Bonython, Tony Gresham, Colin Kaye, Phil Wood
- 1977 Clyde Boyer, Tony Gresham, Peter Sweeney, Phil Wood
- 1980 Tony Gresham, John Kelly, Jeff Senior, Peter Sweeney
- 1982 Eric Couper, Roger Mackay, Ossie Moore, Peter Sweeney
- 1983 Eric Couper, Wayne Smith, Peter Sweeney, Chris Tatt
- 1984 Neil Crafter, Tony Dight, Chris Tatt, Jeff Wagner
- 1986 Brad King, Peter O'Malley, Ray Picker, Gerard Power
- 1987 David Ecob, Brett Johns, Mike Sammells, Stephen Taylor
- 1988 David Ecob, Bradley Hughes, Brett Johns, Lester Peterson
- 1990 Robert Allenby, Steven Conran, Chris Gray, Lester Peterson
- 1991 Robert Allenby, Stephen Leaney, Lester Peterson, John Wade
- 1992 Stuart Appleby, David Armstrong, Steve Collins, Stephen Leaney, Lucas Parsons, Lester Peterson
- 2007 Andrew Dodt, Richie Gallichan, Rick Kulacz, Tim Stewart
- 2008 Scott Arnold, Matthew Griffin, Jason Scrivener, John Younger
- 2009 Luke Bleumink, Matt Jager, Ryan McCarthy, Brendan Smith
- 2010 Daniel Beckmann, Kieran Pratt, Jason Scrivener, Jordan Sherratt
- 2012 Jake Higginbottom, Nathan Holman, Ryan McCarthy, Cameron Smith
- 2016 Brett Coletta, Cameron John, Min Woo Lee, Zach Murray

=== New Zealand ===
- 1947 Bob Glading, Guy Horne, Bryan Silk, Tim Woon
- 1948 Bob Glading, John Hornabrook, Bryan Silk, Tim Woon
- 1952 Tony Gibbs, Guy Horne, Bryan Silk, Tim Woon
- 1953 Tom Jeffery, Stuart Jones, Sid McDonald, Tim Woon
- 1956 Bob Charles, Stuart Jones, Bryan Silk, Tim Woon
- 1961 Walter Godfrey, Frank Gordon, Stuart Jones, Ross Murray, Ross Newdick, Ian Woodbury
- 1964 John Durry, Stuart Jones, Ted McDougall, Ross Murray
- 1965 John Durry, Stuart Jones, John Means, Ted McDougall, Ross Murray, Ian Woodbury
- 1966 John Durry, Stuart Jones, Ross Murray, Bruce Stevens
- 1967 Geoff Clarke, John Durry, Stuart Jones, Ross Murray, Bruce Stevens, Boris Vezich
- 1969 G.D. Brown, Geoff Clarke, John Durry, Stuart Jones, Ted McDougall, Ross Murray, Bruce Rafferty, Bruce Stevens
- 1976 Alex Bonnington, Peter Burney, Geoff Clarke, Ted McDougall
- 1977 Alex Bonnington, Geoff Clarke, Paul Hartstone, Mike Nicholson
- 1980 Michael Barltrop, Geoff Clarke, Paul Hartstone, Colin Taylor
- 1982 Michael Barltrop, Paul Hartstone, Colin Taylor, Tony Treen
- 1983 Michael Barltrop, Terry Cochrane, Jim Lapsley, Colin Taylor
- 1984 Michael Barltrop, Terry Cochrane, Brent Paterson, Colin Taylor
- 1986 Michael Barltrop, Terry Cochrane, Owen Kendall, Brent Paterson
- 1987 Phil Aickin, Michael Barltrop, Owen Kendall, Brent Paterson
- 1988 Phil Aickin, Michael Barltrop, Owen Kendall, Brent Paterson
- 1990 Phil Aickin, Steven Alker, Michael Long, Grant Moorhead
- 1991 Steven Alker, Tony Christie, Grant Moorhead, Stephen Scahill
- 1992 Steven Alker, Michael Campbell, Tony Christie, Saali Herewini, Grant Moorhead, Stephen Scahill
- 2007 James Gill, Danny Lee, Troy Ropiha, Andrew Searle
- 2008 Nick Gillespie, Danny Lee, Daniel Pearce, Jared Pender
- 2009 Ryan Fox, Daniel Pearce, Sean Riordan, Peter Spearman-Burn
- 2010 Ben Campbell, Ryan Fox, Nick Gillespie, Andy Stewart
- 2012 Ben Campbell, Vaughn McCall, Mathew Perry, Blair Riordan
- 2016 Ryan Chisnall, Nick Coxon, Daniel Hillier, Luke Toomey

== See also ==
- Tasman Cup
- Trans Tasman Cup
