= Lake Macquarie Amateur =

Tournament information
- Location: Marks Point, New South Wales
- Established: 1958
- Course(s): Belmont Golf Course
- Organised by: Belmont Golf Club
- Format: 72-hole stroke play
- Month played: January
- Final year: 2016

Final champion
- Harrison Endycott

The Lake Macquarie Amateur was an amateur golf tournament in Australia. It was first played in 1958 and was organised by and played at the Belmont Golf Club in nearby Marks Point, New South Wales. It was a 72-hole stroke play tournament (54 holes in 1958).

It was a Golf Australia national ranking event and a "Category B" tournament in the World Amateur Golf Ranking.

== Winners ==
- 2016 Harrison Endycott
- 2015 Corey Conners
- 2014 Ryan Evans
- 2013 Josh Munn
- 2012 Daniel Nisbet
- 2011 Brady Watt
- 2010 Kieran Pratt
- 2009 Scott Arnold
- 2008 Danny Lee
- 2007 Blake McGrory
- 2006 Adam Gee
- 2005 Marc Leishman
- 2004 Jarrod Lyle
- 2003 Jarrod Lyle
- 2002 Chris Campbell
- 2001 Nick Dougherty
- 2000 Scott Strange
- 1999 John Sutherland
- 1998 Brett Rumford
- 1997 Geoff Ogilvy
- 1996 Stephen Allan
- 1995 Lester Peterson
- 1994 Marcus Wheelhouse
- 1993 Steve Collins
- 1992 Stephen Leaney
- 1991 Shane Tait
- 1990 Ricky Willison
- 1989 Russell Claydon
- 1988 David Ecob
- 1987 Shane Robinson
- 1986 Peter O'Malley
- 1985 Ray Picker
- 1984 Jamie Crowe
- 1983 Colin Dalgleish
- 1982 Curt Byrum
- 1981 Roger Chapman
- 1980 Gerard Power
- 1979 Colin Kaye
- 1978 Ray Carlin
- 1977 Don Sharp
- 1976 Colin Kaye
- 1975 Colin Kaye
- 1974 Phil Billings
- 1973 Rodger Davis
- 1972 Bruce Boyle
- 1971 Don Sharp
- 1970 Don Sharp
- 1969 Jack Newton
- 1968 John Bennett
- 1967 Tony Jones
- 1966 Phil Billings
- 1965 Phil Billings
- 1964 Phil Billings
- 1963 Kevin Donohue
- 1962 Ken Johnston
- 1961 Phil Billings
- 1960 Phil Billings
- 1959 Phil Billings
- 1958 Bruce Devlin
