= Harry Berwick =

Australian golfer (1923–1988)

Harry Berwick MBE
Personal information
- Full name: Harry Williamson Berwick
- Nationality: Australia
- Born: 23 April 1923 Erskineville, Sydney, New South Wales, Australia
- Died: 3 April 1988 (aged 64) Concord, Sydney, New South Wales, Australia

Career
- Sport: Golf
- Turned professional: 1975

Harry Williamson Berwick MBE (23 April 1923 – 3 April 1988) was an Australian golfer. He won the Australian Amateur twice, in 1950 and 1956, and won the 1952 New Zealand Amateur. He won two open titles in 1956, the Lakes Open and the New Zealand Open. He was part of the Australian teams that won the 1954 Commonwealth Tournament at St Andrews and the 1966 Eisenhower Trophy in Mexico City. He turned professional at the age of 52.

== Early life ==
Berwick was born in Erskineville, Sydney, on 23 April 1923. He served in the Royal Australian Air Force in 1944 and 1945. He was a bricklayer.

== Golf career ==
In 1949 Berwick won the trophy as the leading amateur in the Australian Open at The Australian Golf Club. He had tied with Peter Heard, despite a final round of 80. Berwick won the award after a second 18-hole playoff, the two having been level after the first one. In 1950 Berwick won the Australian Amateur at Royal Adelaide, beating Bill Edgar 4&3 in the final. He was four-up after the morning round and won with an eagle-3 at the 33rd hole.

In 1952 Berwick was part of the four-man Australian team that toured New Zealand. The Sloan Morpeth Trophy match against New Zealand was tied, Berwick winning his singles match against Bryan Silk. Later in the tour Berwick finished runner-up in the New Zealand Open at Wanganui, a stroke behind Alex Murray, taking the Bledisloe Cup as the leading amateur. The following week he won the New Zealand Amateur, beating Jack Coogan 7&6 in the final.

Berwick won the New South Wales Amateur Championship at Concord in 1953, beating Bruce Crampton 5&4 in the final. He won the title again in 1955, beating Ted Rigney by one hole at Long Reef. He reached the final again in 1958, but lost 4&3 to Bruce Devlin. In 1953 he was again in the Australian team for the Sloan Morpeth Trophy at The Australian Golf Club. The Australian team won by 5 matches to 1, Berwick being the only Australian to lose a match, beaten 2&1 by Tim Woon. In 1954, Berwick was part of the six-man Australian team that played in the inaugural Commonwealth Tournament on the Old Course at St Andrews. The Australian players also competed in the Amateur Championship at Muirfield, Berwick losing in the second round after beating New Zealander Bryan Silk in the first round. The Australian team won the five-team Commonwealth event, with three wins and a tied match against Great Britain.

In 1956 Berwick won the Australian Amateur for the second time. As in 1950 he met Bill Edgar in the final, holing a 12-foot putt at the 36th hole to win the match. The following week he won the Lakes Open, three strokes ahead of Billy Bolger and Eric Cremin. He was the first amateur winner of the event since 1937, when Jim Ferrier won. He was again selected for the Australian Sloan Morpeth Trophy match, at Wanganui. Australia won the match 3½ to 2½. Later in the tour he won the New Zealand Open, ahead of runner-up Bob Charles. The following week he reached the semi-final of the New Zealand Amateur, before losing to Charles by two holes.

Berwick was part of the four-man Australian team that won the 1966 Eisenhower Trophy in Mexico City, finishing two strokes ahead of the United States. He also played in 1968 at Royal Melbourne Golf Club, where the Australian team finished fourth.

Berwick was a co-medallist, with Eric Routley, in the 1963 Australian Amateur. In 1967 he was joint third, and leading amateur, in the Australian Open at Commonwealth Golf Club, despite a final round of 76. In the early 1970s he had two more wins in the New South Wales Amateur Championship. In 1971, 16 years after his previous win, he beat Trevor Wood 5&4 in the final, while in 1973 he had a 6&5 win over Bruce Cook in the final.

In December 1975, at the age of 52, Berwick turned professional. His decision followed a change in the Australian PGA rules which meant that some new professionals no longer needed to serve an apprenticeship before receiving prize money.

== Later life ==
Berwick was appointed Member of the Order of the British Empire (MBE) in the 1977 New Year Honours for service to sport. He died of cancer on 3 April 1988 in Concord Hospital.

== Tournament wins ==
- 1950 Australian Amateur
- 1952 New Zealand Amateur
- 1953 New South Wales Amateur Championship
- 1955 New South Wales Amateur Championship
- 1956 Australian Amateur, Lakes Open, New Zealand Open
- 1971 New South Wales Amateur Championship
- 1973 New South Wales Amateur Championship

== Team appearances ==
- Eisenhower Trophy (representing Australia): 1966 (winners), 1968
- Commonwealth Tournament (representing Australia): 1954 (winners)
- Sloan Morpeth Trophy (representing Australia): 1952 (tied), 1953 (winners), 1956 (winners), 1966 (winners)
- Australian Men's Interstate Teams Matches (representing New South Wales): 1949 (winners), 1950 (winners), 1951 (winners), 1952 (winners), 1953, 1955, 1956 (winners), 1957 (winners), 1958 (winners), 1959 (winners), 1960 (winners), 1961, 1963, 1965 (winners), 1967 (winners), 1968, 1969 (winners), 1973 (winners)
