= Ronnie Shade =

Scottish golfer

Personal information
- Full name: Ronald David Bell Mitchell Shade
- Nationality: Scotland
- Born: 18 October 1938 Edinburgh, Scotland
- Died: 10 September 1986 (aged 47) Edinburgh, Scotland

Career
- Sport: Golf
- Turned professional: 1968
- Professional wins: 7

Best results in major championships
- Masters Tournament: DNP
- PGA Championship: DNP
- U.S. Open: DNP
- The Open Championship: T16: 1966

Achievements and awards
- Member of the Order of the British Empire (MBE): 1968

Ronald David Bell Mitchell Shade, MBE (18 October 1938 – 10 September 1986) was a Scottish professional golfer.

== Early life ==
In 1938, Shade was born in Edinburgh. He grew up playing golf at Duddingston Golf Club in that city.

== Amateur career ==
Shade enjoyed unrivalled success as an amateur player in the 1960s, winning five consecutive Scottish Amateur Championships from 1963 to 1967. (He also lost in the final in 1962.) In 1966, he also finished as leading individual player at the Eisenhower Trophy, low amateur in the Open Championship, and reached the final of the British Amateur Championship, losing to Bobby Cole. He represented Britain and Ireland in the Walker Cup on four occasions (1961 to 1967 inclusive) and was three times winner of the English Amateur Open Strokeplay Championship (the Brabazon Trophy). Shade's amateur golf success was all the more noteworthy, since he came from a working-class background, and during that era British amateur golf was the preserve of the well-to-do.

Shade was awarded the MBE as an amateur. He was often referred to by fellow players as "Right Down the Bloody Middle," a nickname based on his initials and his exceptional accuracy.

== Professional career ==
In 1968, at the relatively late age of 30, he turned pro. Shade did not enjoy as many victories as a professional that his amateur record might have foretold, although he won the Ben Sayers–Sunderland Tournament and the Carroll's International in 1969, in his rookie season. He also represented Scotland at the World Cup in 1970, 1971 and 1972. His strength at match play golf remained proven, however; he was runner-up at the 1970 British PGA Matchplay Championship and was a semi-finalist on two further occasions.

== Death ==
Shade died in Edinburgh after a long illness.

== Amateur wins ==
- 1954 British Youths Open Championship (under-18 section)
- 1956 Scottish Boys Amateur
- 1961 Brabazon Trophy
- 1963 Scottish Amateur, Brabazon Trophy
- 1964 Scottish Amateur
- 1965 Scottish Amateur
- 1966 Scottish Amateur
- 1967 Scottish Amateur, Brabazon Trophy
- 1968 Scottish Amateur Stroke Play Championship

== Professional wins (7) ==
- 1969 Ben Sayers–Sunderland Tournament, Carroll's International
- 1970 Scottish Professional Championship
- 1972 Skol Tournament
- 1973 Skol Tournament
- 1975 Mufulira Open, Skol Tournament

== Results in major championships ==
Tournament	1960	1961	1962	1963	1964	1965	1966	1967	1968	1969	1970	1971	1972	1973	1974	1975	1976	1977
The Open Championship	T43		CUT		CUT	CUT	T16LA		CUT	CUT	T25	CUT	CUT	T51	T22	CUT		CUT

Note: Shade only played in The Open Championship.

Did not play

LA = Low amateur
CUT = missed the half-way cut (3rd round cut in 1969, 1971, 1972, 1975 and 1977 Open Championships)
"T" = tied

== Team appearances ==
this list may be incomplete

Amateur

- Walker Cup (representing Great Britain and Ireland): 1961, 1963, 1965 (tied), 1967
- Eisenhower Trophy (representing Great Britain and Ireland): 1962, 1964 (winners), 1966 (individual leader), 1968
- St Andrews Trophy (representing Great Britain & Ireland): 1962 (winners), 1964 (winners), 1966 (winners), 1968 (winners)
- Commonwealth Tournament (representing Great Britain): 1963 (joint winners), 1967 (joint winners)
- European Amateur Team Championship (representing Scotland): 1965, 1967
- Men's Home Internationals (representing Scotland): 1957, 1960, 1961, 1962, 1963, 1964, 1965, 1966, 1967, 1968

Professional

- World Cup (representing Scotland): 1970, 1971, 1972
- Double Diamond International (representing Scotland): 1971, 1972, 1973 (winners), 1974, 1975
