= New South Wales Amateur Championship =

Amateur golf tournament

Tournament information
- Location: New South Wales, Australia
- Established: 1898
- Format: Match play

Current champion
- (Australia) Declan O'Donovan

The New South Wales Amateur Championship is the state amateur golf championship of New South Wales, Australia. It was first played in 1898.

== History ==
In early 1898 Lord Hampden, the Governor of New South Wales, presented a solid silver cup to the Royal Sydney and The Australian golf clubs. The two clubs agreed that the cup would be presented to the winner of a 72-hole bogey competition, with 36 holes played on each of the two courses, and be regarded as the amateur championship of New South Wales. Entry was restricted to members of New South Wales clubs. The 1898 championship was won by Hugh MacNeil who finished 14 holes ahead of the runner-up Ted Simpson. MacNeil won again in 1899, this time by an even wider margin, 19 holes, over Simpson. MacNeil was absent in 1900 and the championship was won by Edward Bayly Macarthur by a single hole from Simpson. Simpson won for the first time in 1901, 5 holes ahead of MacNeil, and retained the title in 1902, by 3 holes from Macarthur.

In early 1903 it was decided to separate the Hampden Cup from the New South Wales Amateur Championship. The Hampden Cup would remain a scratch bogey competition for members of the two clubs, while the NSW Amateur Championship would be organised later in the year, as a match-play event. It was agreed that the 1903 NSW Amateur would be played at The Australian Golf Club in October. There would be a 36-hole stroke-play stage after which the leading 8 amateurs would play 36-hole match-play. The stroke-play stage would be run as a separate competition with entry open to professionals as well as amateurs. Amateurs and professionals from outside New South Wales were able to compete. The open event was seen as a preliminary to the establishment of an Australian Open. An amateur, Dan Soutar, won the open competition by two strokes from Carnegie Clark, followed by five other professionals. Soutar finished 15 strokes ahead of the other amateurs. He went on to win the NSW Amateur, beating Henry Gritton 10&8 in the final.

Dan Soutar retained the title in 1904, beating Richmond Whytt 12&11 in the final, having dominated the event. The qualifying stage was for amateurs only and was played in very difficult conditions, with the Saturday afternoon round postponed to the following Monday. Soutar led the qualifying, having scored 91 in the first round, the only player to break 100. He beat Hugh MacNeil 6&4 in the first round and then Frank Hargreaves 15&14 in the semi-final. There was no championship in 1905, with The Australian Golf Club, which had hosted the event in 1903 and 1904, in the process of moving from Botany to Kensington. The organisation of golf in the state was in a period of change with the New South Wales Golf Council being formed in late 1905, initially without Royal Sydney, who joined in 1906. Royal Sydney was then chosen to host the 1906 championship, the first under the control of the NSW Golf Council. The format from 1904 was retained with 8 qualifiers. Soutar having turned professional, the championship saw two new finalists, Oscar O'Brien and Tom Cheadle, O'Brien winning 5&3.

The 1907 championship was at Royal Sydney, the number of qualifiers being increased to 16. A trophy was given to the leading player in qualifying, although if that player went on to win the championship, the trophy was given to the runner-up in the qualifying. Oscar O'Brien led the qualifying, but the final was contested between Ted Simpson and 18-year-old Eric Apperly. Simpson won at the 37th hole. The 1908 event was held on the new course of The Australian Golf Club at Kensington and resulted in a second success for O'Brien. A new format was tried in 1909 with a 72-hole qualifying event, 36 holes at Royal Sydney and 36 at The Australian. Just four players qualified for the match play, which was at Royal Sydney. Michael Scott qualified second and went on to win the championship. From 1910 the format returned to an earlier format with 8 players qualifying the 36-hole stroke play. Scott retained his title, beating Claude Felstead 4&3 in the final. O'Brien won for the third time in 1911, while Eric Apperly won for the first time in 1912. Apperly reached the final again in 1913 but lost to Walter Sturrock, a recent arrival from Scotland. Jim Howden won in 1914, beating Tom Howard in the final.

After World War I the format remained the same until 1926, when the number of qualifiers was increased from 8 to 16. Tom Howard, the 1914 runner-up won the event in 1919 and 1921 before turning professional. Eric Apperly, who had won in 1912, won the championship four more times between 1920 and 1930. Henry McClelland and Harry Sinclair each reached three final in the 1920s, winning once each. Sinclair, like Howard, would have a successive professional career. Ivo Whitton, from Victoria, who won the Australian Open five times, became the champion in 1929.

In 1931 the stroke-play qualifying was dropped and the event was match-play only, early rounds being over 18 holes. In 1936 the 36-hole qualifying was reintroduced but with 32 qualifiers, all match-play rounds being over 36 holes. Jim Ferrier won in 1931, as a 16-year-old, and won three more times in the 1930s. Harry Hattersley won twice, in 1933 and 1935, and was also runner-up twice. Alan Waterson won the first time in 1939, beating Ferrier in the final and won again in 1940.

When the championship resumed in 1946, defending champion Alan Waterson lost in the semi-final to the eventual winner, Kep Enderby. However Waterson won again in 1947 and 1948, completing a run of four wins in five editions. Peter Heard had his only win in 1949 while Harry Hattersley had his third win in 1950, 15 years after his previous success. Keith Pix also won the championship three times, in 1951, 1952 and 1954. Harry Berwick was another multiple winner in the 1950s, winning in 1953 and 1955, and he also reached the final in 1958, losing to Bruce Devlin. Kevin Donohoe reached five successive finals from 1960 to 1964, winning twice, in 1962 and 1963. 1965 saw a success for Vic Bulgin, an ex-Rugby League player.

1968 saw the first major revision to the format since the 1930s. The qualifying was extended to 72 holes, becoming a separate event, the winner being the state medallist. At the same time the number of qualifiers was reduced to 16. Tony Gresham became the first medallist, finishing a stroke ahead of Barry Burgess. Gresham reached the final of the championship but lost 6&5 to Jack Newton. Gresham reached the final again in 1969, losing to Don Sharp, before winning in 1970, beating Barry Burgess in the final.

From 1971 the NSW Medal was generally played at a different venue to the amateur championship. In 1971 the number of qualifiers was increased again to 32. Harry Berwick won the championship for a third time, 16 years after his previous win. Two years later, in 1973, he won for the fourth time, with Tony Gresham winning for the second time in 1972. Colin Kaye won three times in four years, in 1974, 1976 and 1977, with Phil Wood another repeat winner, in 1975 and 1978. Gresham won for a third time in 1982 and he is the last repeat winner.

== Winners ==
Year	Winner	Score	Runner-up	Venue	Ref.
2024	(Australia) Declan O'Donovan	4 & 3	(Australia) Andrew Kirkman	Belmont	
2023	(Australia) Abel Eduard	3 & 1	(Australia) Harrison Crowe	Pennant Hills	
2022	(Australia) Harrison Crowe	6 & 4	(Australia) Jye Halls	Shell Cove	
2021	(Australia) Andrew Richards	4 & 3	(Australia) Jeffrey Guan	Magenta Shores	
2020	(England) Ben Schmidt	7 & 5	(England) Callum Farr	St. Michael's	
2019	(India) Kartik Sharma	2 & 1	(Australia) Nathan Barbieri	Terrey Hills	
2018	(England) Gian-Marco Petrozzi	37 holes	(Australia) Jediah Morgan	Royal Canberra	
2017	(England) Scott Gregory	1 up	(England) Marco Penge	Terrey Hills	
2016	(Australia) Austin Bautista	6 & 5	(Australia) Troy Moses	Riverside Oaks	
2015	(England) Paul Howard	37 holes	(Australia) David Micheluzzi	Avondale	
2014	(Australia) Jarryd Felton	3 & 1	(Australia) James Bannan	Concord	
2013	(Australia) Ben Eccles	2 & 1	(Australia) Troy Moses	Royal Sydney	
2012	(Australia) Brett Drewitt	1 up	(Australia) Michael Lambert	Elanora	
2011	(England) Jack Senior	3 & 2	(England) Andy Sullivan	New South Wales	
2010	(Australia) Jake Higginbottom	3 & 2	(England) Tommy Fleetwood	Royal Sydney	
2009	(Australia) Michael Smyth	2 & 1	(Scotland) Ross Kellett	The Australian	
2008	(Australia) Michael Raseta		(Australia) Tim Hart	Ryde Parramatta	
2007	(England) Gary Wolstenholme	2 & 1	(Australia) Tim Stewart	Terrey Hills	
2006	(Australia) Won Joon Lee	37 holes	(England) Gary Wolstenholme	Concord	
2005	(Australia) Mitchell Brown		(Australia) Won Joon Lee	Elanora	
2004	(Australia) Gavin Flint			Royal Sydney	
2003	(Republic of Ireland) Colm Moriarty	7 & 5	(Australia) James Nitties	The Lakes	
2002	(Australia) Richard Swift				
2001	(Australia) Robert Payne	1 up	(Australia) Chris Campbell	Duntryleague	
2000	(Australia) Warwick Dews	5 & 4	(Australia) Shannon Jones	Liverpool	
1999	(Australia) Chris Campbell	1 up	(Australia) Simon Furneaux	Killara	
1998	(Australia) Darren Mackay	2 & 1	(Australia) Nathan Green	Pennant Hills	
1997	(Australia) Bryce MacDonald	5 & 3	(Australia) Brendan Jones	Horizons	
1996	(Australia) Brad Lamb	3 & 2	(Australia) Nathan Green	Castle Hill	
1995	(Australia) Brendan Jones	3 & 2	(Australia) Graydon Woolridge	Elanora	
1994	(Australia) David Bransdon	4 & 2	(New Zealand) Steven Alker	Liverpool	
1993	(Australia) Matthew Ecob	1 up	(Australia) Paul Gow	St. Michael's	
1992	(New Zealand) Michael Campbell	37 holes	(New Zealand) Phil Tataurangi	Mollymook	
1991	(Australia) Lucas Parsons	5 & 4	(Australia) Wayne Stewart	Monash	
1990	(Australia) Steven Conran	5 & 4	(Australia) Len Wade	Kogarah	
1989	(Australia) Roger Dannock	5 & 3	(Australia) Lucas Parsons	Bonnie Doon	
1988	(Australia) Robert Willis	5 & 3	(Australia) Wayne Stewart	Elanora	
1987	(Australia) Ray Picker	7 & 6	(Australia) David Ecob	Liverpool	
1986	(Australia) Peter O'Malley	5 & 4	(Australia) Mark Nash	Pymble	
1985	(Australia) Brett Ogle	3 & 2	(Australia) Gerard Power	Bonnie Doon	
1984	(Australia) Lester Peterson	4 & 3	(Australia) Tony Dight	Elanora	
1983	(Australia) Tony Dight	4 & 3	(Australia) Tony Gresham	Avondale	
1982	(Australia) Tony Gresham (3)	5 & 3	(Australia) Dave Bromley	St. Michael's	
1981	(Australia) Eric Couper	5 & 4	(Australia) Chris Longley	Cromer	
1980	(Australia) Ian Hood	2 & 1	(Australia) Brad Sullivan	Ryde-Parramatta	
1979	(Australia) Arthur Bosch	2 & 1	(Australia) Col Lindsay	Royal Sydney	
1978	(Australia) Phil Wood (2)	6 & 5	(Australia) Rory Slade	Killara	
1977	(Australia) Colin Kaye (3)	4 & 3	(Australia) Phil Wood	Bonnie Doon	
1976	(Australia) Colin Kaye (2)	3 & 2	(Australia) Phil Wood	Avondale	
1975	(Australia) Phil Wood	3 & 2	(Australia) Bruce Boyle	Monash	
1974	(Australia) Colin Kaye	10 & 9	(Australia) Eric Couper	Royal Sydney	
1973	(Australia) Harry Berwick (4)	6 & 5	(Australia) Bruce Cook	The Lakes	
1972	(Australia) Tony Gresham (2)	5 & 4	(Australia) George Bell	Pennant Hills	
1971	(Australia) Harry Berwick (3)	5 & 4	(Australia) Trevor Wood	New South Wales	
1970	(Australia) Tony Gresham	6 & 5	(Australia) Barry Burgess	Monash	
1969	(Australia) Don Sharp	6 & 5	(Australia) Tony Gresham	Bonnie Doon	
1968	(Australia) Jack Newton	6 & 5	(Australia) Tony Gresham	Concord	
1967	(Australia) Steven Brown	1 up	(Australia) Barry Burgess	St. Michael's	
1966	(Australia) Bill Tobin	4 & 3	(Australia) Doug Witham	Pymble	
1965	(Australia) Vic Bulgin	4 & 3	(Australia) Des Turner	Manly	
1964	(Australia) Barrie Baker	3 & 2	(Australia) Kevin Donohoe	Pennant Hills	
1963	(Australia) Kevin Donohoe (2)	3 & 2	(Australia) Noel Wade	The Lakes	
1962	(Australia) Kevin Donohoe	8 & 7	(Australia) Noel Bartell	The Australian	
1961	(Australia) Phil Billings	5 & 4	(Australia) Kevin Donohoe	Royal Sydney	
1960	(Australia) Ted Ball	4 & 3	(Australia) Kevin Donohoe	Bonnie Doon	
1959	(Australia) Peter Langham	4 & 2	(Australia) Keith Pix	Manly	
1958	(Australia) Bruce Devlin	4 & 3	(Australia) Harry Berwick	New South Wales	
1957	(Australia) Noel Bartell	5 & 4	(Australia) Barry Warren	The Australian	
1956	(Australia) Jack McCarthy	37 holes	(Australia) Lee Patterson	The Lakes	
1955	(Australia) Harry Berwick (2)	1 up	(Australia) Ted Rigney	Long Reef	
1954	(Australia) Keith Pix (3)	4 & 3	(Australia) Maurice Behringer	Royal Sydney	
1953	(Australia) Harry Berwick	5 & 4	(Australia) Bruce Crampton	Concord	
1952	(Australia) Keith Pix (2)	3 & 1	(Australia) Peter Heard	The Australian	
1951	(Australia) Keith Pix	6 & 4	(Australia) Harry Hattersley	Manly	
1950	(Australia) Harry Hattersley (3)	5 & 3	(Australia) Peter Heard	The Lakes	
1949	(Australia) Peter Heard	5 & 4	(Australia) Tom Tanner	Manly	
1948	(Australia) Alan Waterson (4)	6 & 4	(Australia) Jack Barkel	New South Wales	
1947	(Australia) Alan Waterson (3)	7 & 6	(England) Stuart Bradshaw	Royal Sydney	
1946	(Australia) Kep Enderby	3 & 2	(Australia) John Allerton	The Australian	
1941–1945 No tournament due to World War II
1940	(Australia) Alan Waterson (2)	3 & 2	(Australia) Doug Davies	The Lakes	
1939	(Australia) Alan Waterson	4 & 3	(Australia) Jim Ferrier	The Australian	
1938	(Australia) Jim Ferrier (4)	8 & 6	(Australia) Doug Davies	New South Wales	
1937	(Australia) Jim Ferrier (3)	1 up	(Australia) Harry Hattersley	Royal Sydney	
1936	(Australia) Tom McKay	2 up	(Australia) Peter Headlam	The Australian	
1935	(Australia) Harry Hattersley (2)	3 & 2	(Australia) Stan Keane	Royal Sydney	
1934	(Australia) Jim Ferrier (2)	9 & 8	(Australia) Jack Radcliffe	The Australian	
1933	(Australia) Harry Hattersley	3 & 1	(Australia) Alan Waterson	The Australian	
1932	(Australia) Reg Bettington	7 & 5	(Australia) Bill Dobson	Royal Sydney	
1931	(Australia) Jim Ferrier	1 up	(Australia) Eric Apperly	Royal Sydney	
1930	(Australia) Eric Apperly (5)	7 & 6	(Australia) Harry Hattersley	The Australian	
1929	(Australia) Ivo Whitton	5 & 3	(Australia) Hector Morrison	Royal Sydney	
1928	(Australia) George Fawcett	1 up	(Australia) Robert Lee Brown	The Australian	
1927	(Australia) Eric Apperly (4)	4 & 3	(Australia) Wally Smith	Royal Sydney	
1926	(Australia) Hector Morrison	3 & 2	(Australia) Peter Headlam	The Australian	
1925	(Australia) Harry Sinclair	6 & 5	(Australia) Henry McClelland	Royal Sydney	
1924	(Australia) Henry McClelland	37 holes	(Australia) Harry Sinclair	The Australian	
1923	(Australia) Frank Murdoch	2 up	(Australia) Harry Sinclair	Royal Sydney	
1922	(Australia) Eric Apperly (3)	38 holes	(Australia) Henry McClelland	The Australian	
1921	(Australia) Tom Howard (2)	9 & 7	(Australia) Edward Pope	Royal Sydney	
1920	(Australia) Eric Apperly (2)	10 & 8	(Australia) Clive Boyce	The Australian	
1919	(Australia) Tom Howard	2 up	(Australia) Henry McClelland	Royal Sydney	
1915–1918 No tournament due to World War I
1914	(Scotland) Jim Howden	1 up	(Australia) Tom Howard	The Australian	
1913	(Scotland) Walter Sturrock	5 & 4	(Australia) Eric Apperly	Royal Sydney	
1912	(Australia) Eric Apperly	6 & 5	(Australia) Claude Reading	The Australian	
1911	(Australia) Oscar O'Brien (3)	1 up	(Australia) Claude Reading	Royal Sydney	
1910	(England) Michael Scott (2)	4 & 3	(Australia) Claude Felstead	The Australian	
1909	(England) Michael Scott	11 & 10	(Australia) Charles Mackenzie	Royal Sydney	
1908	(Australia) Oscar O'Brien (2)	6 & 5	(Australia) Charles Mackenzie	The Australian	
1907	(Australia) Ted Simpson (3)	37 holes	(Australia) Eric Apperly	Royal Sydney	
1906	(Australia) Oscar O'Brien	5 & 3	(Australia) Tom Cheadle	Royal Sydney	
1905	No tournament				
1904	(Australia) Dan Soutar (2)	12 & 11	(Australia) Richmond Whytt	The Australian	
1903	(Australia) Dan Soutar	10 & 8	(Australia) Henry Gritton	The Australian	

Year	Winner	Score	Margin of victory	Runner-up	Venues	Ref.
Hampden Cup
1902	(Australia) Ted Simpson (2)	16 down	3 holes	(Australia) Edward Bayly Macarthur	The Australian & Royal Sydney	
1901	(Australia) Ted Simpson	9 down	5 holes	(New Zealand) Hugh MacNeil	Royal Sydney & The Australian	
1900	(Australia) Edward Bayly Macarthur	6 down	1 hole	(Australia) Ted Simpson	Royal Sydney & The Australian	
1899	(New Zealand) Hugh MacNeil (2)	12 up	19 holes	(Australia) Ted Simpson	Royal Sydney & The Australian	
1898	(New Zealand) Hugh MacNeil	8 up	14 holes	(Australia) Ted Simpson	Royal Sydney & The Australian	

Additional source:

== New South Wales Medal ==
When the first match-play championship was played in 1903 there was a 36-hole stroke-play qualifying stage. The same system was used in subsequent years, the exceptions being in 1908, when the qualifying was over 72 holes, and from 1931 to 1935, when the event was match-play only. In 1968 the stroke-play stage was extended to 72 holes and became a separate competition, the New South Wales Medal, although it continued to be used as qualification for the amateur championship. Initially the Medal was played immediately before the amateur championship, on the same course, but from 1971 the two were separated. In 1971 the Medal was played at Avondale, with the amateur played at the New South Wales club, starting three weeks later. In 2017 the event was reduced to 36 holes.

=== Winners ===
- 2024 Declan O'Donovan
- 2023 Chris Fan
- 2022 Joshua Greer
- 2021 Jeffrey Guan
- 2020 Jediah Morgan
- 2019 Joey Savoie
- 2018 Nathan Barbieri
- 2017 Travis Smyth
- 2016 Jang Seung-bo
- 2015 Cameron Davis
- 2014 Curtis Luck
- 2013 Tom Power Horan
- 2012 Neil Raymond
- 2011 Andy Sullivan
- 2010 Michael Williams
- 2009 Kyle Grant, Jason Scrivener, Lincoln Tighe
- 2008 Rohan Blizard
- 2007 Stephen Lewton
- 2006 Won Joon Lee
- 2005 Gary Wolstenholme
- 2004 Richie Gallichan
- 2003 Colm Moriarty
- 2002 Kurt Barnes, Adam Groom
- 2001 Ewan Porter
- 2000 Jason King
- 1999 Adam Groom, Andrew Partridge
- 1998 David Gleeson, Mark Thomson, Graydon Woolridge
- 1997 Brendan Jones
- 1996 Scott Gardiner, Nathan Green, Brendan Jones
- 1995 Stephen Allan
- 1994 Ian Bradley
- 1993 Chris Jones
- 1992 Phil Tataurangi
- 1991 Wayne Stewart
- 1990 Steven Conran, Matthew Ecob
- 1989 Robert Willis
- 1988 Gerard Power
- 1987 Chris Longley
- 1986 Tony Gresham, Ray Picker
- 1985 Peter O'Malley
- 1984 Brad Lincoln, Ray Picker
- 1983 Eric Couper
- 1982 Gerard Power
- 1981 Col Lindsay
- 1980 Phil Aickin
- 1979 Greg Bush
- 1978 Tony Gresham
- 1977 Tony Gresham
- 1976 Tony Gresham
- 1975 Phil Wood
- 1974 Tony Gresham
- 1973 Phil Wood
- 1972 Tony Gresham
- 1971 Noel Ratcliffe
- 1970 Eric Couper
- 1969 Noel Ratcliffe
- 1968 Tony Gresham

Additional source:

== See also ==
- New South Wales Women's Amateur Championship
- Australian Men's Interstate Teams Matches
