= Tony Gresham =

Australian amateur golfer (1940–2025)

Tony Gresham OAM
Personal information
- Full name: Anthony Yale Gresham
- Nationality: Australia
- Born: 4 December 1940 Sydney, New South Wales, Australia
- Died: 13 January 2025 (aged 84)

Career
- Sport: Golf
- Status: Amateur
- Professional wins: 2

Number of wins by tour
- PGA Tour of Australasia: 2

Anthony Yale Gresham, OAM (4 December 1940 – 13 January 2025) was an Australian amateur golfer. He won the 1977 Australian Amateur and represented Australia in seven successive Eisenhower Trophy events between 1968 and 1980. He also won two professional events, the 1975 New South Wales Open and the 1978 South Australian Open.

Gresham died after a long illness on 13 January 2025, at the age of 84.

== Golf career ==
Gresham reached four finals of the Australian Amateur, although he only won once, beating Chris Bonython at the 40th hole in 1977. He lost to Ray Jenner in 1973, Peter Sweeney in 1976 and Mike Clayton in 1978. He was also a medalist four times, in 1967, 1975, 1977 and 1981. Gresham won the New South Wales Amateur Championship three times, in 1970, 1972 and 1982. He won the New South Wales Medal six times in the first 11 times the event was contested, winning in 1968, 1972, 1974, 1977, 1977 and 1978. He was also a joint winner, with Ray Picker, in 1986. Before the founding of the NSW Medal, in 1968, he had led the 36-hole qualifying for the NSW amateur twice, in 1964 and 1967.

In 1979, 1980 and 1981, Gresham travelled to Europe to play in the Amateur Championship. In 1979 he reached the semi-finals before losing 3&2 to Scott Hoch. In 1980 he won the French Amateur Championship, beating fellow Australian John Kelly 4&2 in the final, but lost at the 20th hole to Jamie Moffat in a second round match in the Amateur Championship. He reached the semi-final of the Amateur Championship again in 1981, losing 2&1 to American Joel Hirsch.

Gresham won two professional events, the 1975 New South Wales Open at Manly, where he finished a stroke ahead of Bill Dunk, and the 1978 South Australian Open at Glenelg, which he won by 6 strokes from fellow amateur Chris Bonython, Rodger Davis taking the first prize as the leading professional.

Gresham played in seven successive Eisenhower Trophy contests from 1968 to 1980. The Australian team took the silver medal in 1972 and the bronze medal in 1976 and 1978. In 1972 in Buenos Aires, he was leading individual scorer, two strokes ahead of Ben Crenshaw and Vinny Giles. He also represented Australia in the 1971 Commonwealth Tournament in Auckland, and four times in the Sloan Morpeth Trophy against New Zealand.

== Awards ==
Gresham was awarded the Medal of the Order of Australia in the 1988 Australia Day Honours for services to golf.

== Amateur wins ==
- 1968 New South Wales Medal
- 1970 New South Wales Amateur Championship
- 1972 New South Wales Medal, New South Wales Amateur Championship
- 1974 New South Wales Medal
- 1976 New South Wales Medal
- 1977 New South Wales Medal, Australian Amateur
- 1978 New South Wales Medal
- 1980 French Open Amateur Championship, New South Wales Amateur Championship
- 1986 New South Wales Medal (tied with Ray Picker)

== Professional wins (2) ==
=== PGA Tour of Australasia wins (2) ===
No.	Date	Tournament	Winning score	Margin of victory	Runner-up
1	19 Oct 1975	New South Wales Open (as an amateur)	−13 (66-69-69-71=275)	1 stroke	(Australia) Bill Dunk
2	31 May 1978	South Australian Open (as an amateur)	−6 (71-70-68-73=282)	6 strokes	(Australia) Chris Bonython (a)

== Team appearances ==
- Eisenhower Trophy (representing Australia): 1968, 1970, 1972, 1974, 1976, 1978, 1980
- Commonwealth Tournament (representing Australia): 1971
- Sloan Morpeth Trophy (representing Australia): 1969 (winners), 1976, 1977 (winners), 1980
- Australian Men's Interstate Teams Matches (representing New South Wales): 1963, 1964 (winners), 1966, 1967 (winners), 1968, 1969 (winners), 1970 (winners), 1971, 1973 (winners), 1974, 1975, 1976 (winners), 1977, 1978 (winners), 1979, 1980 (winners), 1981 (winners), 1982
