= Ross Murray (golfer) =

New Zealand amateur golfer (1933–2023)

Personal information
- Full name: Ross Cheyne Murray
- Nationality: New Zealand
- Born: 25 July 1933 Invercargill, New Zealand
- Died: 5 April 2023 (aged 89)

Career
- Sport: Golf
- Status: Amateur

Ross Cheyne Murray (25 July 1933 – 5 April 2023) was a New Zealand amateur golfer.

== Golf career ==
Murray won the 1972 New Zealand Amateur. He was runner-up in the Canadian Amateur Championship in 1967, losing to fellow New Zealander Stuart Jones in the final, the two being part of the New Zealand team that had just competed in the Commonwealth Tournament. He was also runner-up in the 1969 Australian Amateur, losing to Bob Shearer.

Murray represented New Zealand at international level from 1959 to 1974. He played in the Eisenhower Trophy seven consecutive times between 1962 and 1974. In 1964, the team took the bronze medal, with Murray tied for the third best individual score. In 1970, the team won the silver medal. He played in four Commonwealth Tournament matches between 1959 and 1971 and also six times against Australia in the Sloan Morpeth Trophy.

== Tournament wins ==
- 1972 New Zealand Amateur

== Team appearances ==
- Commonwealth Tournament (representing New Zealand): 1959, 1963, 1967 (tied), 1971
- Eisenhower Trophy (representing New Zealand): 1962, 1964, 1966, 1968, 1970, 1972, 1974
- Sloan Morpeth Trophy (representing New Zealand): 1961 (winners), 1964, 1965 (winners), 1966, 1967, 1969
