= Alan Waterson =

Australian amateur golfer

Personal information
- Full name: Alan Norman Waterson
- Nationality: Australia
- Born: 18 October 1915 New South Wales, Australia
- Died: 1 May 2003 (aged 87) New South Wales, Australia

Career
- Sport: Golf
- Status: Amateur

Alan Norman Waterson (18 October 1915 – 1 May 2003) was an Australian amateur golfer. In 1946 he was runner-up in the Australian Open and the winner of the Australian Amateur. He won the New South Wales Amateur Championship four times, and represented Australia in the Sloan Morpeth Trophy.

== Golf career ==
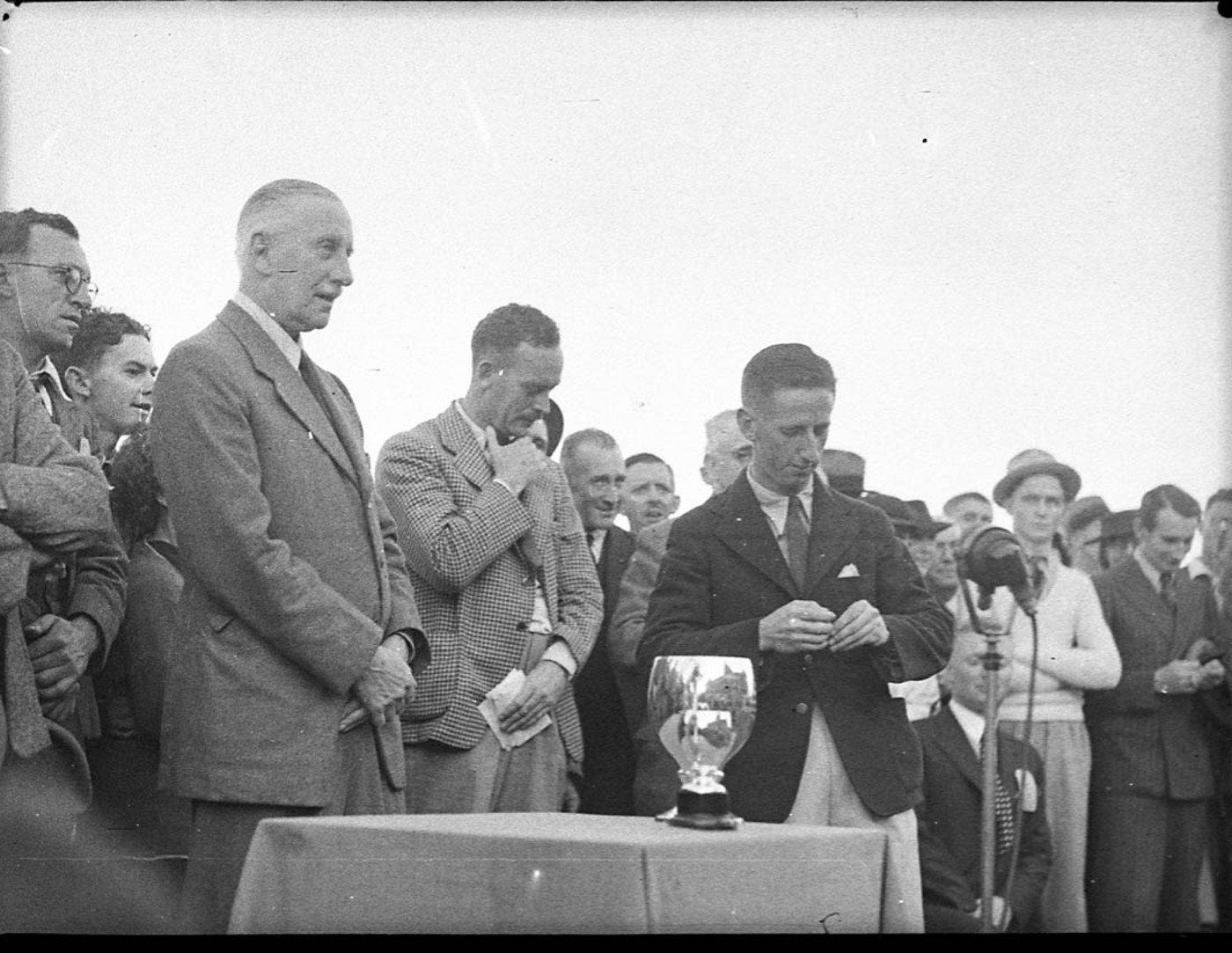
Waterson (right) at the 1939 NSW Amateur

In 1946 Waterson was runner-up in the Australian Open at Royal Sydney. After the first day he was tied for second place with Ossie Pickworth, two behind Kep Enderby, after rounds of 71 and 73. Enderby faded on the final day and Waterson's rounds of 73 and 74 were enough for second place, two strokes behind Pickworth, who had rounds of 69 and 76. The Australian Amateur was also played at Royal Sydney, after the open. Waterson beat Jim Pendergast in the final, to win the title. Waterson was 3 up after the morning round, but Pendergast levelled the match after seven holes of the afternoon round. Waterson again took a three-hole lead and, despite losing the 16th, won the match 2&1.

Waterson won the New South Wales Amateur Championship four times in five editions between 1939 and 1948, only losing in the 1946 semi-final to the eventual winner, Kep Enderby. As a 17-year-old, he had reached the final in 1933, but lost to Harry Hattersley. He won for the first time in 1939, beating Jim Ferrier 4&3 in the final. He won again in 1940, 1947 and 1948.

Waterson was twice runner-up in the New South Wales Close Championship. At Killara in 1935 he tied with Don Spence, the pair being 16 strokes behind the winner, Jim Ferrier. In 1947 he finished two strokes behind Norman Von Nida at Manly. He had also finished second, 6 strokes behind Von Nida, in the 1936 Queensland Open at Royal Queensland, and won the Queensland Amateur a few days later, beating Mick Ryan 7&6 in the final.

In 1948 Waterson represented Australia in the Sloan Morpeth Trophy at Royal Melbourne Golf Club, New Zealand winning 4½ to 1½. He lost his singles match to Bryan Silk.

== Personal life ==
Waterson was born on 18 October 1915 and died on 1 May 2003. He was a buyer at Gowings, a Sydney department store chain.

== Tournament wins ==
- 1936 Queensland Amateur
- 1939 New South Wales Amateur Championship
- 1940 New South Wales Amateur Championship
- 1946 Australian Amateur
- 1947 New South Wales Amateur Championship
- 1948 New South Wales Amateur Championship

== Team appearances ==
- Sloan Morpeth Trophy (representing Australia): 1948
- Australian Men's Interstate Teams Matches (representing New South Wales): 1934 (winners), 1937 (winners), 1939, 1946, 1947, 1948, 1951 (winners)
