= Harry Hattersley =

Australian amateur golfer

Personal information
- Full name: Harry William Hattersley
- Nationality: Australia
- Born: 15 March 1908 New South Wales, Australia
- Died: 17 February 1970 (aged 61) New South Wales, Australia

Career
- Sport: Golf
- Status: Amateur

Best results in major championships
- Masters Tournament: DNP
- PGA Championship: DNP
- U.S. Open: DNP
- The Open Championship: CUT: 1938

Harry William Hattersley (15 March 1908 – 17 February 1970) was an Australian amateur golfer. He won the Australian Amateur in 1930 and 1947, and the New South Wales Amateur Championship in 1933, 1935 and 1950. He was part of an Australian team that went to Britain in 1938 and he later represented Australia in the Sloan Morpeth Trophy.

== Golf career ==
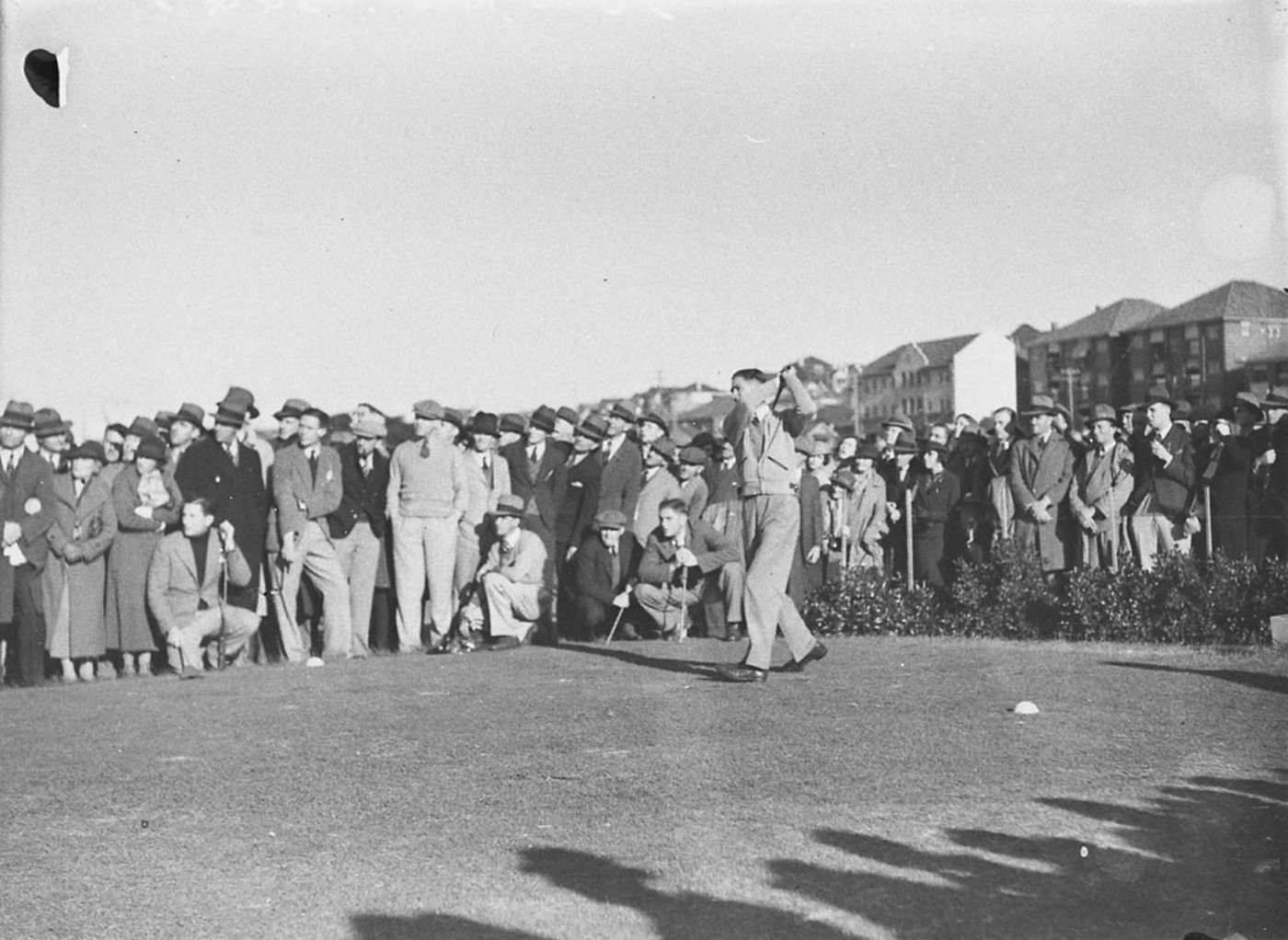
Harry Hattersley

Hattersley won the Australian Amateur twice, in 1930 and 1947, and also reached the final in 1935. The 1930 championship was played ta Metropolitan Golf Club and Hattersley won, beating Alex Russell 3&1 in the final. His second win was 17 years later, in 1947, when he beat Bill Gluth by one hole in the final at Royal Adelaide Golf Club. In 1935 he had reached the final at Royal Adelaide, but lost 2&1 to Jim Ferrier.

Hattersley reached the final of the New South Wales Amateur Championship in 1930, but lost 7&6 to Eric Apperly. He won the championship for the first time in 1933, beating Alan Waterson in the final, and won again in 1935, beating Stan Keane in the final. He reached the final again in 1937 but lost a close match to Jim Ferrier, by a single hole. He had his third win in the event in 1950, beating Peter Heard in the final, and reached the final again the following year, losing to Keith Pix.

In 1930 Hattersley represented New South Wales in the Kirk-Windeyer Cup against New Zealand at Christchurch Golf Club. New South Wales lost the match, but he was their only player to win a match, beating Jack Black. In 1948 he represented Australia in the Sloan Morpeth Trophy at Royal Melbourne Golf Club, New Zealand winning 4½ to 1½. He lost his singles match to Tim Woon.

In 1938 Hattersley travelled to Britain as part of a four-man Australian team which included Tom McKay, Len Nettlefold and Mick Ryan. The team arrived in mid-May and played in The Amateur Championship at Troon. Hattersley reached the quarter-finals before losing to the Canadian Ross Somerville. He was one up after 15 holes but lost the last three holes. The team stayed for the 1938 Open Championship in early July. Nettlefold failed to qualify, while the other three missed the cut, which was limited to the top 40 players after two rounds. Hattersley was the best of the Australians, scoring 150 and missing the cut by two strokes. Hattersley returned via the United States and played in the United States Amateur in September. However he withdrew after 14 holes of the first qualifying round, having injured his back during the Atlantic crossing. He returned to Sydney at the end of October.

== Personal life ==
Hattersley died of a heart attack on 17 February 1970, aged 61. He had had a previous heart attack in 1966. He was a stockbroker and company director and left an estate valued at nearly A$1.9 million. His sister Alison was a noted tennis player.

== Tournament wins ==
- 1930 Australian Amateur
- 1933 New South Wales Amateur Championship
- 1935 New South Wales Amateur Championship
- 1947 Australian Amateur
- 1950 New South Wales Amateur Championship

== Team appearances ==
- Kirk-Windeyer Cup (representing New South Wales): 1930
- Sloan Morpeth Trophy (representing Australia): 1948
- Australian Men's Interstate Teams Matches (representing New South Wales): 1929, 1930, 1931, 1932 (winners), 1933, 1935, 1936, 1937 (winners), 1946, 1947, 1948, 1949 (winners), 1950 (winners), 1951 (winners), 1952 (winners), 1953, 1954, 1955, 1957 (winners)
