= 1964 Eisenhower Trophy =

Coordinates: 42.039°N 12.368°E

Tournament information
- Dates: 7–10 October
- Location: Rome, Italy
- Course: Olgiata Golf Club
- Format: 72 holes stroke play

Statistics
- Par: 72
- Field: 33 teams 132 players

Champion
- Great Britain & Ireland; Michael Bonallack, Rodney Foster, Michael Lunt & Ronnie Shade
- 895 (+31)
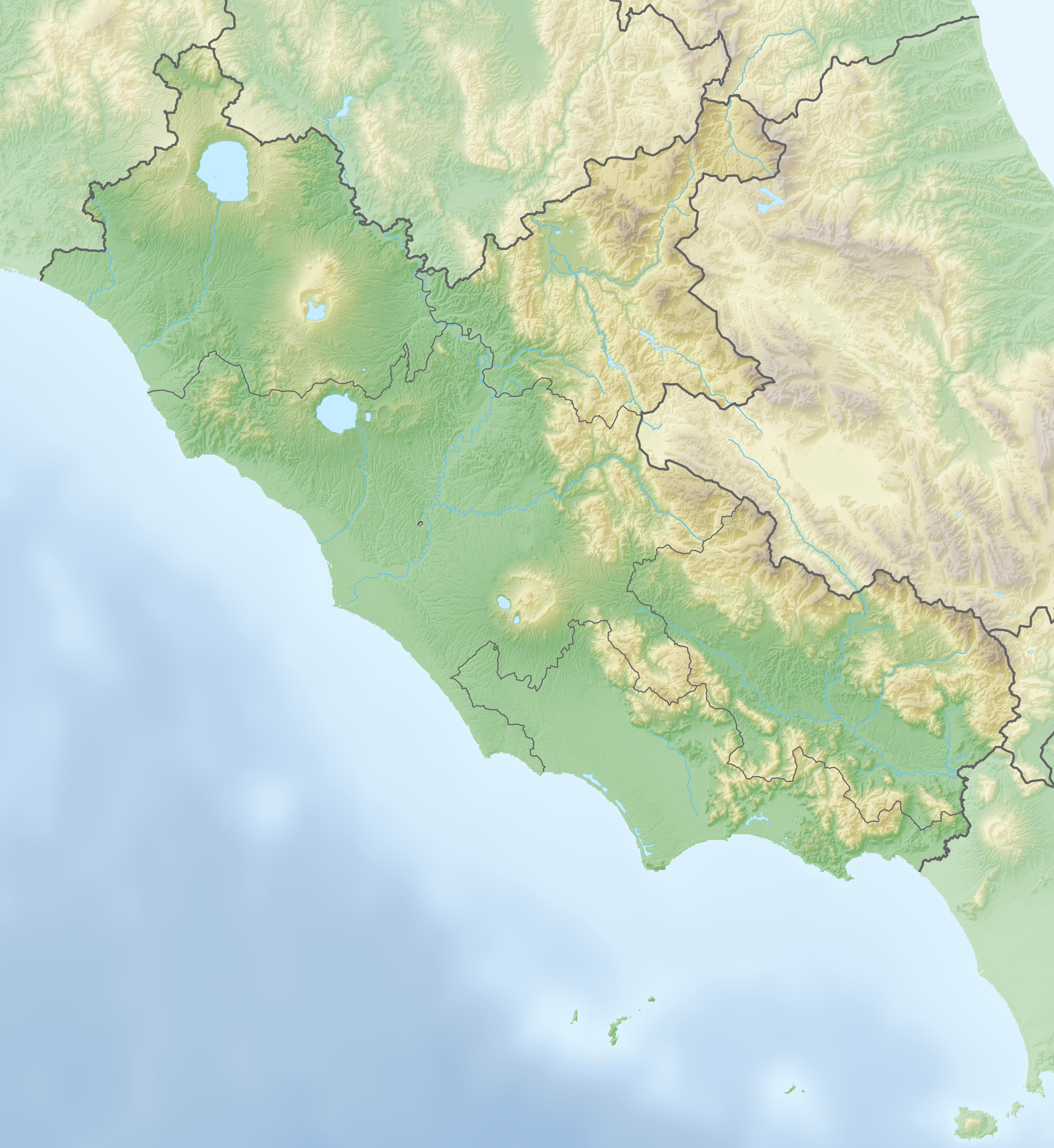
- Location in Italy Location in Lazio

The 1964 Eisenhower Trophy took place 7–10 October at the Olgiata Golf Club in Olgiata, north of Rome, Italy. It was the fourth World Amateur Team Championship for the Eisenhower Trophy. The tournament was a 72-hole stroke play team event with 33 four-man teams. The best three scores for each round counted towards the team total.

Great Britain and Ireland won the Eisenhower Trophy, beating Canada by two strokes. Canada took the silver medal while New Zealand, a further three strokes behind, took the bronze. The defending champions, the United States, finished fourth.

== Teams ==
33 teams contested the event. Each team had four players.

The following table lists the players on the leading teams.

Country	Players
Argentina	Hernan Fernandez, Jorge Ledesma, Angel Monguzzi, Raul Travieso
Australia	Barrie Baker, Phil Billings, Tom Crow, Kevin Hartley
Austria	Fritz Jonak, Alexander Maculan, Klaus Nierlich, Wolfganf Pollak
Belgium	Jaques Moerman, Paul Rolin, Fredric Rodesch, Philippe Washer
Bermuda	Ford Hutchings, Brendam Ingham, Lois Moniz, George E. Wardman
Brazil	Fernando Chaves Barcellos, Robert Falkenburg, Carlos Sozio, Nestor L. Sozio Jr
Canada	Keith Alexander, Gary Cowan, Douglas Silverberg, Nick Weslock
Chile	Arturo Mori, Christian Prieto, Eric van der Valk, Jaime R. Vergara
Republic of China	Chen Chien-chin, Hsieh Min-Nan, Hsu Sheng-san, Kuo Chie-Hsiung
Denmark	John Jacobsen, Nils Elsøe Jensen, Niels Thygesen, Ole Wilberg-Jørgensen
France	Patrick Cros, Hervé Frayssineau, Alexis Godillot, Gaëtan Mourgue D'Algue
Great Britain & Ireland	Michael Bonallack, Rodney Foster, Michael Lunt, Ronnie Shade
Iceland	Petur Bjornsson, Magnus Gudmundsson, Gunnar Solnes, Ottar Yngvasson
India	Ashok S. Malik, S.S. Malik, R.K. Pitamber, P. G. Sethi
Italy	Carlo Bordogna, Angelo Croce, Alberto Schiaffino, Lorenzo Silva
Japan	Yoshikane Hirose, Kiyoshi Ishimoto, Hiroshi Morimoto, Ginjiro Nakabe
Malaysia	Sulaiman Bin Bluah, Darwis Deren, Rashid Mallal, Brian R. Marks
Mexico	Juan Antonio Estrada, Tomás Lehmann, Rafael Quiroz, Enrique Sterling
Netherlands	Robbie E. van Erven Dorens, Joan F. Dudok van Heel, Jani A.R. Roland Holst, Ajef F. Knappert
New Zealand	John Durry, Stuart Jones, Ted McDougall, Ross Murray
Northern Rhodesia	John Drysdale, Phil Dunne, Jackie Muir, Ken Treloar
Peru	Maxwell Cooper, Miguel Grau, Ricardo Hernandez, Guillermo Salazar
Philippines	Alejandro Prieto, Alberto Silverio, Luis F. Silverio, Dick Villalon
Portugal	Fernando P. Coelho, Jorge J. de Figueiredo, Daniel B. Lane, Manuel Leao
South Africa	Murray Grindrod, David Symons, Reginald C. Taylor, Dorian Wharton-Hood
Southern Rhodesia	R.A. Cahl, Gordon Owen, M.J. Reinders, R.W. White
Spain	Luis Alvarez de Bohorques, Duke of Fernán-Núñez, Iván Maura, Francisco Sanchiz
Sweden	Gunnar Carlander, Claes Jöhncke, Lennart Leinborn, Bengt Möller
Switzerland	Olivier Barras, Otto Dillier, Peter Gutermann, Rudolf Müller
United States	Deane Beman, William C. Campbell, Dale Morey, Ed Tutwiler
Uruguay	Francisco Etchecerry, Carlos Giambruno, Pablo Paullier, Fernando Valdez
Venezuela	Manuel Bernandez, Fernan Frias R. Keith Guise, José M. Stuyck
West Germany	Klaus R Bez, Walter Brühne, Peter Möller, Nils Wirichs

== Scores ==
Place	Country	Score	To par
1st place, gold medalist(s)	Great Britain & Ireland	214-231-226-224=895	+31
2nd place, silver medalist(s)	Canada	224-227-225-221=897	+33
3rd place, bronze medalist(s)	New Zealand	225-223-229-223=900	+36
4	United States	221-225-230-232=908	+44
5	Australia	223-230-229-228=910	+46
T6	Italy	218-231-233-229=911	+47
T6	Chinese Taipei	219-233-227-232=911	+47
8	Argentina	220-236-229-228=913	+49
9	Mexico	219-234-231-233=917	+53
10	France	228-233-229-232=922	+58
11	South Africa	223-225-243-238=929	+65
12	Spain	228-237-241-236=942	+78
13	Southern Rhodesia	230-237-237-239=943	+79
14	Sweden	237-237-237-235=946	+82
T15	Northern Rhodesia	223-241-246-239=949	+85
T15	India	231-233-242-243=949	+85
17	Denmark	230-249-238-235=952	+88
18	Venezuela	231-245-235-243=954	+90
19	Belgium	232-248-238-237=955	+91
20	Switzerland	232-234-249-244=959	+95
21	Austria	239-247-231-243=960	+96
22	Bermuda	233-247-241-243=964	+100
T23	Chile	238-240-242-245=965	+101
T23	Japan	227-248-245-245=965	+101
25	Philippines	236-248-244-239=967	+103
26	West Germany	236-247-238-250=971	+107
27	Brazil	229-254-245-249=977	+113
28	Netherlands	237-248-245-248=978	+114
29	Peru	242-260-252-252=1006	+142
30	Malaysia	255-252-263-249=1019	+155
31	Portugal	251-257-256-261=1025	+161
32	Iceland	253-265-266-259=1043	+179
33	Uruguay	257-271-269-262=1059	+195

== Individual leaders ==
There was no official recognition for the lowest individual scores.

Place	Player	Country	Score	To par
1	Hsieh Min-Nan	Chinese Taipei	72-77-72-73=294	+6
2	Raul Travieso	Argentina	73-74-73-75=295	+7
T3	Keith Alexander	Canada	76-75-72-74=297	+9
T3	Ross Murray	New Zealand	77-70-76-74=297	+9
T5	Juan Antonio Estrada	Mexico	72-74-75-77=298	+10
T5	Nick Weslock	Canada	74-72-75-77=298	+10
T7	Angelo Croce	Italy	70-75-75-79=299	+11
T7	Ted McDougall	New Zealand	72-76-77-74=299	+11
9	Ronnie Shade	Great Britain & Ireland	70-81-74-75=300	+12
T10	Rodney Foster	Great Britain & Ireland	72-79-75-75=301	+13
T10	Michael Lunt	Great Britain & Ireland	72-76-79-74=301	+13
