= Vic Bulgin =

Australian RL coach and former Australia international rugby league footballer

Personal information
- Full name: Victor John Bulgin
- Born: 8 November 1927 Sydney, New South Wales, Australia
- Died: 19 January 2007 (aged 79) Sydney, New South Wales, Australia

Playing information
- Position: Fullback, Centre
Club
Years	Team	Pld	T	G	FG	P
1947–49	Eastern Suburbs	33	4	32	0	76
1949	Bourke
1950–51	Canterbury-Bankstown	10	0	3	0	6
	Total	43	4	35	0	82
Representative
Years	Team	Pld	T	G	FG	P
1948	New South Wales
1949	Country NSW	1	0	0	0	0
1948–49	Australia

Coaching information
Club
Years	Team	Gms	W	D	L	W%
1951	Canterbury-Bankstown	18	7	0	11	39
1955	Canterbury-Bankstown	0	0	0	0
	Total	18	7	0	11	39

Victor John Bulgin (8 November 1927 – 19 January 2007) was an Australian rugby league footballer who played in the 1940s and 50s. An Australia national and New South Wales state representative fullback, he played for Sydney's Eastern Suburbs and Canterbury-Bankstown clubs. Bulgin also represented his country as an amateur golfer.

== Rugby league career ==
Bulgin, a fullback, began his career with the Eastern Suburbs club as a 19-year-old in 1947. The following year he was selected for the New South Wales team's tour of New Zealand and later that year was selected to go on the 1948–49 Kangaroo tour, becoming Kangaroo No 254. He appeared in 16 matches on tour, – no tests. In 1949 Bulgin again went away with the Australian rugby league team on its tour of New Zealand, once again though he never played in any of the test matches.

In 1950, he joined the Canterbury-Bankstown club where he played for two seasons. In 1951 he captain-coached the club.

While playing football, Bulgin also served in the New South Wales Police Force and in 2008, rugby league's centennial year in Australia, he was named at fullback in a NSW Police team of the century.

== Amateur golf career ==
At the end of his rugby league career he represented Australia as an amateur golfer in the Commonwealth Tournament in 1959 and 1967 and in the Sloan Morpeth Trophy in 1961 and 1967. In 1959 he was runner up to Kel Nagle in the Australian Open. In 1965 he won the New South Wales Amateur Championship. He represented New South Wales in the Australian Men's Interstate Teams Matches seven times between 1959 and 1967.

== Sources ==
- Whiticker, Alan; Hudson, Glen (2007). The Encyclopedia of Rugby League Players. Wetherill Park, New South Wales: Gary Allen Pty Ltd. p. 609. ISBN 978-1-877082-93-1.
