= Handa Junior Masters =

The Handa Junior Masters was an international junior golf tournament on the Golf Australia at The Vines Resort & Country Club in Perth. It was founded in 2004. The tournament was previously known as the Mastercard Junior Masters.

== Winner ==
Year	Boy	Girl	Source
Handa Junior Masters
2011	(Australia) Jake Higginbottom	(Australia) Minjee Lee	
2010	(Australia) Ryan Peake	(Thailand) Thidipa Suwannapura	
2009	(Australia) Matt Stieger	(Australia) Jacki Marshall	
Mastercard Junior Masters
2008	(Australia) Daniel Nisbet	(Australia) Jessica Noh	
2007	(Australia) Jason Scrivener	(Australia) Stephanie Na	
2006	(Australia) Kevin Lee	(England) Sarah Oh	
2005	(Australia) Samuel Shin	(South Korea) Mi-Sun Cho	
2004	(Australia) Ben Pisani	(South Korea) Mi-Sun Cho	
