= Gary Cowan =

Canadian golfer

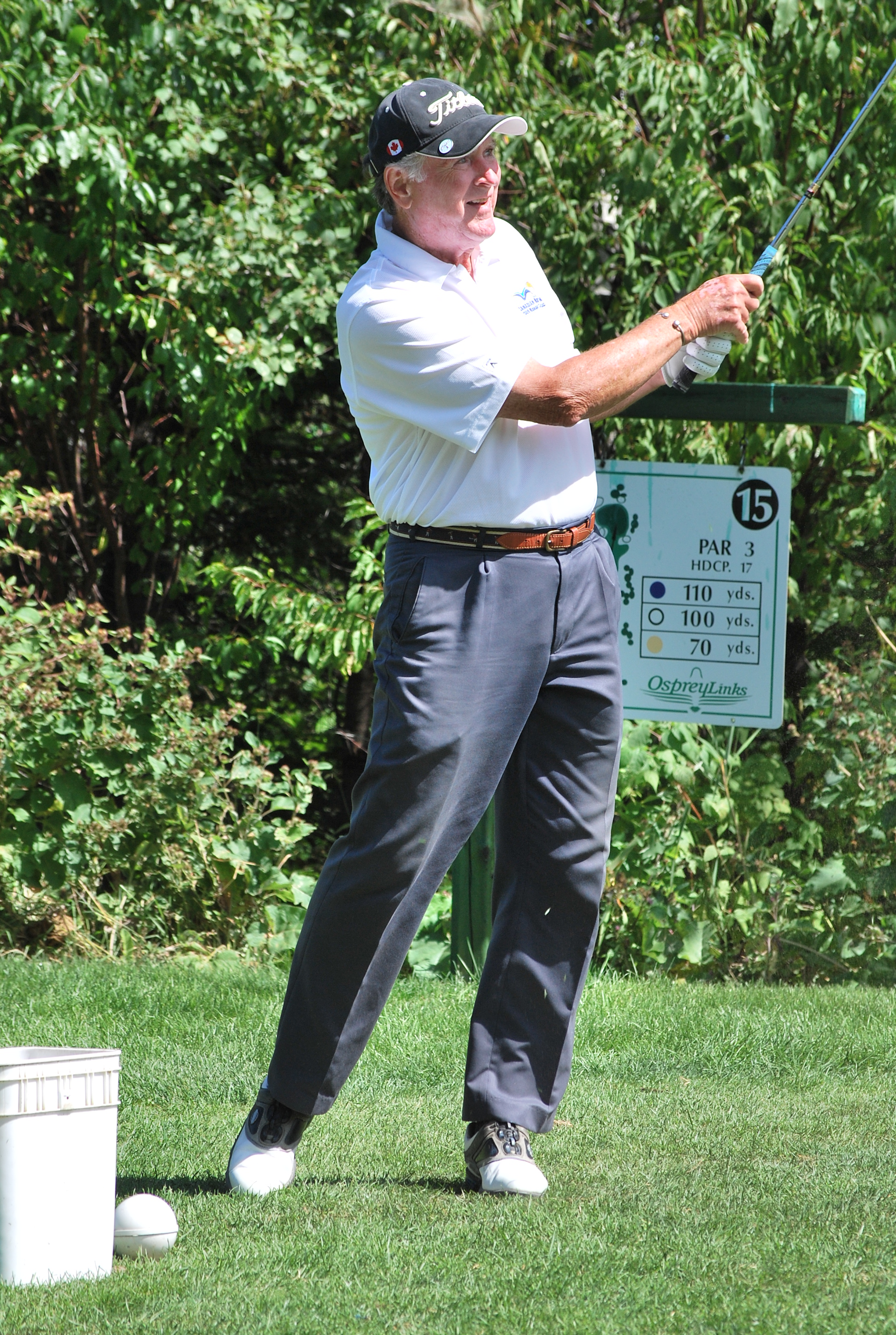
- Cowan in 2009

Personal information
- Nationality: Canada
- Born: October 28, 1938 (age 88) Kitchener, Ontario
- Height: 6 ft 0 in (183 cm)
- Weight: 185 lb (84 kg; 13.2 st)

Career
- Sport: Golf
- Turned professional: 1990
- Former tour: Senior PGA Tour

Best results in major championships
- Masters Tournament: T25: 1964
- PGA Championship: DNP
- U.S. Open: DNP
- The Open Championship: DNP

Achievements and awards
- Canada's Sports Hall of Fame: 1967
- Canadian Golf Hall of Fame: 1972
- Canadian Male Golfer of the 20th Century: 2000

Gary Cowan (born October 28, 1938) is a Canadian amateur golfer.

== Early life ==
Cowan was born in Kitchener, Ontario, Canada. He began to play golf at the municipal golf course, Rockway, alongside other local players such as Moe Norman and Gerry Kesselring. The three were coached by Lloyd Tucker.

In 1956, Cowan reached the semifinals of the Ontario Amateur Championship at a record-low age of 17.

== Amateur career ==
Cowan won the 1961 Canadian Amateur Championship, and reached the finals on four other occasions (1959, 1960, 1964, 1968), and finished second at stroke play twice more (1974, 1978). Cowan finished as the low individual scorer at the 1962 Eisenhower Trophy, an international amateur team event, in Japan.

Cowan won the United States Amateur Championship on two occasions. In 1966, he was victorious at the Merion Golf Club in suburban Philadelphia, after defeating Deane Beman in an 18-hole playoff. Then in 1971, he won at the Wilmington Country Club in Wilmington, Delaware, by sinking his approach shot on the final hole with a nine-iron for an eagle two. Cowan remains one of only two Canadians to win the U.S. Amateur.

Cowan also won the Sunnehanna Amateur in 1964 and the Porter Cup in 1969.

Between 1964 and 1984 Cowan won nine Ontario Amateur championships, and this is the record for that event.

== Professional career ==
In 1990, at the age of 52, Cowan turned professional and played on the Senior PGA Tour, earning three top-10 finishes.

== Awards and honors ==
- In 1967, Cowan was inducted into Canada's Sports Hall of Fame
- In 1972, he was inducted to the Canadian Golf Hall of Fame at the age of 33, the youngest inductee at the time
- In 1999, he was named the Canadian Male Golfer of the Century by the Royal Canadian Golf Association.
- Cowan is also a member of the Ontario Golf Hall of Fame.
- In 2003, he was inducted into the Ontario Sports Hall of Fame.

== Amateur wins (17) ==
- 1956 Canadian Junior Amateur
- 1961 Canadian Amateur
- 1964 Ontario Amateur, Sunnehanna Amateur
- 1966 U.S. Amateur
- 1968 Ontario Amateur
- 1969 Porter Cup
- 1970 North and South Amateur
- 1971 U.S. Amateur, Ontario Amateur
- 1974 Ontario Amateur
- 1975 Ontario Amateur
- 1977 Ontario Amateur
- 1978 Ontario Amateur
- 1981 Ontario Amateur
- 1984 Ontario Amateur

== Professional wins ==
- 1968 Ontario Open (as an amateur)

== Team appearances ==
- Commonwealth Tournament (representing Canada): 1959, 1963, 1967, 1971 (winners)
- Eisenhower Trophy (representing Canada): 1960, 1962 (individual leader), 1964, 1966, 1968, 1970, 1978
- Americas Cup (representing Canada): 1958, 1960, 1961, 1963, 1965 (winners), 1967
