= Commonwealth Tournament =

Tournament information
- Established: 1954
- Format: Team match play
- Final year: 1975

Final champion
- Canada

The Commonwealth Tournament was a men's team golf tournament between teams of amateurs golfers from Great Britain, Australia, Canada, New Zealand and South Africa. It was played roughly every four years, in 1954, 1959, 1963, 1967, 1971 and 1975. In 1971 and 1975 there were only four teams, South Africa did not compete in 1971 while Australia missed the 1975 event.

== Format ==
Each team played the others. Each match was contested over one day with foursomes in the morning and singles matches in the afternoon. There were 3 foursomes and 6 singles in each match.

== Results ==
| Year | Dates | Venue | Winners | Points | Ref |
|---|---|---|---|---|---|
| 1954 | 1–5 June | Old Course at St Andrews | Australia | 7 | |
| 1959 | 3–7 November | Royal Johannesburg Golf Club | South Africa | 6 | |
| 1963 | 15–19 October | Royal Sydney Golf Club | Australia; Great Britain | 6 | |
| 1967 | 9–13 August | Victoria Golf Club | Great Britain; New Zealand | 5 | |
| 1971 | 20–24 October | Auckland Golf Club | Canada | 6 | |
| 1975 | 20–22 November | Royal Durban Golf Club | Canada | 4 | |

== 1954 ==
The first tournament was organised to celebrate the bicentenary of the Royal and Ancient Golf Club of St Andrews. It was played on the Old Course at St Andrews from 1 to 5 June.

The teams were:

- Great Britain: David Blair, Ian Caldwell, Frank Deighton, Gerald Micklem, Alan Thirlwell, James Wilson
- Australia: Doug Bachli, Harry Berwick, Jack Coogan, Peter Heard, Bill Shephard, Bob Stevens
- Canada: Don Doe, Phil Farley, Bob Fleming, Walter McElroy, Douglas Silverberg, Nick Weslock
- New Zealand: Tony Gibbs, Tom Jeffery, Stuart Jones, Bryan Silk, Ron Timms, Tim Woon
- South Africa: Jimmy Boyd, Roger Brews, Eric Dalton, Denis Hutchinson, A D Jackson, Reg Taylor

=== Final table ===
| Team | Matches | | | Points | Games |
| Team | Won | Lost | Tie | Points | Games |
|---|---|---|---|---|---|
| Australia | 3 | 0 | 1 | 7 | 21 |
| Canada | 2 | 2 | 0 | 4 | 18 |
| Great Britain | 1 | 1 | 2 | 4 | 17½ |
| South Africa | 1 | 2 | 1 | 3 | 15 |
| New Zealand | 1 | 3 | 0 | 2 | 18½ |

== 1959 ==
The second tournament was held at the Royal Johannesburg Golf Club from 3 to 7 November.

The teams were:

- Great Britain: Michael Bonallack, Frank Deighton, Reid Jack, Sandy Saddler, Doug Sewell, Guy Wolstenholme
- Australia: Doug Bachli, Vic Bulgin, Jack Coogan, Bruce Devlin, Kevin Hartley, Justin Seward, Peter Toogood
- Canada: Gary Cowan, John Johnston, Douglas Silverberg, Bert Ticehurst, Nick Weslock, Ron Willey
- New Zealand: Bob Charles, John Durry, Bob Glading, Stuart Jones, Ross Murray, Ross Newdick
- South Africa: Jimmy Boyd, Denis Hutchinson, Jannie le Roux, Reg Taylor, Arthur Walker, R C Williams

=== Final table ===
| Team | Matches | | | Points | Games |
| Team | Won | Lost | Tie | Points | Games |
|---|---|---|---|---|---|
| South Africa | 3 | 1 | 0 | 6 | 22 |
| Australia | 2 | 2 | 0 | 4 | 20 |
| New Zealand | 2 | 2 | 0 | 4 | 19 |
| Great Britain | 2 | 2 | 0 | 4 | 15½ |
| Canada | 1 | 3 | 0 | 2 | 13½ |

== 1963 ==
The third tournament was held at the Royal Sydney Golf Club from 15 to 19 October.

The teams were:

- Great Britain: Michael Bonallack, Peter Green, Michael Lunt, Sandy Saddler, Ronnie Shade, Alan Thirlwell
- Australia: Dennis Bell, Phil Billings, Tom Crow, Kevin Donohoe, Kevin Hartley, John Hood
- Canada: Keith Alexander, Gary Cowan, Douglas Silverberg, Bert Ticehurst, Bill Wakeham, Nick Weslock
- New Zealand: Brian Boys, Peter Creighton, Terry Leech, Stuart Jones, Ross Murray, Ross Newdick
- South Africa: B Franklin, John Hayes, Derek Kemp, Jannie le Roux, Dave Symons, Reg Taylor

=== Final table ===
| Team | Matches | | | Points | Games |
| Team | Won | Lost | Tie | Points | Games |
|---|---|---|---|---|---|
| Australia | 2 | 0 | 2 | 6 | 20½ |
| Great Britain | 3 | 1 | 0 | 6 | 20½ |
| Canada | 1 | 2 | 1 | 3 | 17½ |
| South Africa | 1 | 2 | 1 | 3 | 16½ |
| New Zealand | 1 | 3 | 0 | 2 | 15 |

== 1967 ==
The fourth tournament was held at the Victoria Golf Club, British Columbia, Canada from 9 to 13 August.

The teams were:

- Great Britain: Michael Bonallack, Gordon Cosh, Rodney Foster, Dudley Millensted, Sandy Saddler, Ronnie Shade
- Australia: Dennis Bell, Phil Billings, Bill Britten, Vic Bulgin, Kevin Donohoe, Kevin Hartley
- Canada: Keith Alexander, Gary Cowan, John Johnston, Douglas Silverberg, Wayne Vollmer, Nick Weslock
- New Zealand: Geoff Clarke, John Durry, Stuart Jones, Ross Murray, Bruce Stevens, Boris Vezich
- South Africa: Hugh Baiocchi, Comrie du Toit, John Fourie, Derek Kemp, Rod Mullan, Dave Symons

=== Final table ===
| Team | Matches | | | Points | Games |
| Team | Won | Lost | Tie | Points | Games |
|---|---|---|---|---|---|
| Great Britain | 2 | 1 | 1 | 5 | 18 |
| New Zealand | 2 | 1 | 1 | 5 | 18 |
| South Africa | 2 | 2 | 0 | 4 | 21 |
| Canada | 2 | 2 | 0 | 4 | 18½ |
| Australia | 1 | 3 | 0 | 2 | 14½ |

== 1971 ==
The fifth tournament was held at the Auckland Golf Club from 20 to 24 October. There were only four teams, South Africa withdrawing because of threats of anti-apartheid demonstrations. With only three rounds of matches, the tournament was originally planned to be played on 20, 21 and 23 October. Rain on the first day meant that the first round of matches was not completed until 21 October, the second round being moved to the following day. Further bad weather caused the final round of matches to be delayed by a day. The event was called the New Zealand Golf Centennial Tournament, celebrating the centenary of golf in New Zealand.

The teams were:

- Great Britain: Michael Bonallack, Charlie Green, Rodney Foster, Michael King, George Macgregor, Hugh Stuart
- Australia: Peter Bennett, Bill Britten, Kevin Donohoe, Terry Gale, Tony Gresham, Noel Ratcliffe
- Canada: Keith Alexander, Gary Cowan, Stu Hamilton, Doug Roxburgh, Douglas Silverberg, Nick Weslock
- New Zealand: Rodney Barltrop, Geoff Clarke, Stuart Jones, Ian MacDonald, Paul Shadlock, Ross Murray

=== Final table ===
| Team | Matches | | | Points | Games |
| Team | Won | Lost | Tie | Points | Games |
|---|---|---|---|---|---|
| Canada | 3 | 0 | 0 | 6 | 17½ |
| Australia | 2 | 1 | 0 | 4 | 14½ |
| Great Britain | 1 | 2 | 0 | 2 | 13½ |
| New Zealand | 0 | 3 | 0 | 0 | 8½ |

== 1975 ==
The sixth tournament was held at the Royal Durban Golf Club from 20 to 22 November. There were only four teams, Australia did not compete.

The teams were:

- Great Britain: Nick Faldo, David Greig, Ian Hutcheon, Sandy Lyle, George Macgregor, Geoff Marks
- Canada: Cec Ferguson, Robbie Jackson, Jim Nelford, Doug Roxburgh, Ken Tamke, Dave Webber
- New Zealand: Rodney Barltrop, Geoff Clarke, Stuart Jones, Ted McDougall, Mike Nicholson, Stuart Reese
- South Africa: Coen Dreyer, Chris Heyneman, Gavan Levenson, Robbie Stewart, David Suddards, Peter Todt

=== Final table ===
| Team | Matches | | | Points | Games |
| Team | Won | Lost | Tie | Points | Games |
|---|---|---|---|---|---|
| Canada | 2 | 1 | 0 | 4 | 16 |
| Great Britain | 2 | 1 | 0 | 4 | 13 |
| South Africa | 1 | 2 | 0 | 2 | 14½ |
| New Zealand | 1 | 2 | 0 | 2 | 10½ |
