= 1962 Eisenhower Trophy =

Coordinates: 34.939°N 139.141°E

Tournament information
- Dates: 10–13 October
- Location: Itō, Shizuoka, Japan
- Course: Kawana Hotel (Fuji Golf Course)
- Format: 72 holes stroke play

Statistics
- Par: 70
- Length: 6,587 yards (6,023 m)
- Field: 23 teams 92 players

Champion
- United States; Deane Beman, Labron Harris Jr., Billy Joe Patton & R. H. Sikes
- 854 (+14)

The 1962 Eisenhower Trophy took place 10 to 13 October on the Fuji Golf Course at the Kawana Resort in Itō, Shizuoka, Japan. It was the third World Amateur Team Championship for the Eisenhower Trophy. The tournament was a 72-hole stroke play team event with 23 four-man teams. The best three scores for each round counted towards the team total.

United States retained the Eisenhower Trophy, finishing 8 strokes ahead of the silver medalists, Canada. Great Britain and Ireland finished 12 strokes behind Canada and took the bronze medal for the third successive time while New Zealand finished fourth. Canadian Gary Cowan had the best aggregate for the 72 holes with a level-par 280.

== Teams ==
23 four-man teams contested the event.

| Country | Players |
|---|---|
| Argentina | Oscar Cella, Jorge Ledesma, Hugo Nicora, Raul Travieso |
| Australia | Doug Bachli, Phil Billings, Tom Crow, Kevin Donohoe |
| Bermuda | George McLachlan, James A. Pearman, Richard S.L. Pearman, George E. Wardman |
| Brazil | Humberto de Almeida, Joao Barbosa, Carlos Sozio, Nestor L. Sozio Jr |
| Canada | Gary Cowan, Bill Wakeham, Nick Weslock, Bob Wylie |
| Republic of China | Chang Tung-chan, Chen Chien-chin, Hsieh Min-Nan, Kuo Chie-Hsiung |
| Great Britain & Ireland | Michael Bonallack, Martin Christmas, Sandy Saddler, Ronnie Shade |
| Hong Kong | George G.D. Carter, Kim Hall, John Mackie, Alan F. Sutcliffe |
| India | J.H. Forman, Ashok S. Malik, R.K. Pitamber, P. G. Sethi |
| Italy | Franco Bevione, Carlo Cobianchi, Angelo Croce, Lorenzo Silva |
| Japan | Yoshikane Hirose, Kiyoshi Ishimoto, Naomoto Nabeshima, Ginjiro Nakabe |
| Malaya | Choong Ewe Seong, Too Joon Loke, Patrick Lim, Henry W. Liu |
| Mexico | Hector Alvarez, Juan Antonio Estrada, Roberto Halpern, Tomás Lehman |
| New Zealand | Walter Godfrey, Stuart Jones, Ross Murray, Ross Newdick |
| Pakistan | R.D. Habib, M.M. Hashim Khan, M. Ibrahim Musa, Tajuddin Salimi |
| Peru | Maxwell Cooper, Miguel Grau, Ricardo Hernandez, Arnie Lidback |
| Philippines | Alex Montelibano, Alejandro Prieto, Luis F. Silverio, Dick Villalon |
| South Africa | Barry Franklin, John Hayes, Jannie le Roux, Reg Taylor |
| Spain | Duke of Fernán-Núñez, Iván Maura, Francisco Sanchiz, Juan de Sentmenat |
| Sweden | G.A. Bielke, P-O Johansson, Claes Jöhncke, Rune Karlfeldt |
| Switzerland | Olivier Barras, Otto Dillier, Peter Gutermann, Rudolf Müller |
| United States | Deane Beman, Labron Harris Jr., Billy Joe Patton, R. H. Sikes |
| West Germany | Walter Brühne, Peter Müller, Helge Rademacher, Erik Sellschopp |

== Scores ==
| Place | Country | Score | To par |
|---|---|---|---|
| 1st place, gold medalist(s) | United States | 212-226-211-205=854 | +14 |
| 2nd place, silver medalist(s) | Canada | 215-217-219-211=862 | +22 |
| 3rd place, bronze medalist(s) | Great Britain & Ireland | 222-222-214-216=874 | +34 |
| 4 | New Zealand | 218-224-218-222=882 | +42 |
| 5 | Mexico | 225-232-215-215=887 | +47 |
| 6 | Chinese Taipei | 225-228-222-217=892 | +52 |
| 7 | Australia | 230-225-220-218=893 | +53 |
| 8 | South Africa | 223-233-222-218=896 | +56 |
| 9 | Japan | 227-230-221-224=902 | +62 |
| 10 | Argentina | 225-233-222-225=905 | +65 |
| 11 | Italy | 228-233-227-224=912 | +72 |
| 12 | West Germany | 231-245-223-227=926 | +86 |
| 13 | Philippines | 232-238-226-233=929 | +89 |
| 14 | India | 233-240-227-231=931 | +91 |
| 15 | Hong Kong | 236-237-242-227=942 | +102 |
| 16 | Sweden | 242-239-232-230=943 | +103 |
| 17 | Switzerland | 235-243-237-232=947 | +107 |
| 18 | Spain | 240-242-239-240=961 | +121 |
| 19 | Brazil | 240-246-249-229=964 | +124 |
| 20 | Bermuda | 245-255-239-241=980 | +140 |
| 21 | Peru | 245-252-243-245=985 | +145 |
| 22 | Malaya | 268-260-257-251=1036 | +196 |
| 23 | Pakistan | 265-264-268-259=1056 | +216 |

== Individual leaders ==
There was no official recognition for the lowest individual scores.

| Place | Player | Country | Score | To par |
|---|---|---|---|---|
| 1 | Gary Cowan | Canada | 68-71-72-69=280 | E |
| 2 | R. H. Sikes | United States | 69-76-69-69=283 | +3 |
| 3 | Deane Beman | United States | 70-80-70-66=286 | +6 |
| 4 | Juan Antonio Estrada | Mexico | 73-79-69-66=287 | +7 |
| 5 | Ronnie Shade | Great Britain & Ireland | 75-66-74-76=291 | +11 |
| T6 | Labron Harris Jr. | United States | 73-77-72-70=292 | +12 |
| T6 | Nick Weslock | Canada | 71-73-75-73=292 | +12 |
| 8 | Michael Bonallack | Great Britain & Ireland | 74-80-69-70=293 | +13 |
| T9 | Hector Alvarez | Mexico | 73-78-72-71=294 | +14 |
| T9 | Reg Taylor | South Africa | 73-81-70-70=294 | +14 |
