= Jason Scrivener =

Australian professional golfer

Personal information
- Nationality: Australia
- Born: 18 April 1989 (age 37) Cape Town, South Africa
- Height: 1.82 m (6 ft 0 in)

Career
- Sport: Golf
- Turned professional: 2013
- Current tour: European Tour
- Former tours: PGA Tour of Australasia; PGA Tour Canada; OneAsia Tour
- Professional wins: 1
- Highest ranking: 95 (13 June 2021) (as of 25 October 2026)

Number of wins by tour
- PGA Tour of Australasia: 1

Best results in major championships
- Masters Tournament: DNP
- PGA Championship: T23: 2021
- U.S. Open: CUT: 2018, 2024
- The Open Championship: T53: 2022

Jason Scrivener (born 18 April 1989) is an Australian professional golfer who plays on the European Tour. Born in South Africa, he started playing aged eight and moved to Perth, Australia when he was 10.

== Amateur career ==
Scrivener had a successful amateur career, winning the Australian Boys' Amateur in 2007 to put his name alongside those of Jason Day and Adam Scott. He ranked in the top five in the Australian amateur ranking and was also ranked in the top thirty in the World Amateur Golf Ranking. He competed in the 2010 U.S. Amateur before turning professional later that year.

== Professional career ==
After turning professional, Scrivener played mostly on the PGA Tour of Australasia. In 2013, he managed to qualify for four tour cards in the Australasian, Canadian, OneAsia and Challenge Tours.

He was inspired by former European Tour winner and club-mate at Mandurah Country Club, Western Australia, Jarrod Moseley, to target a career in Europe and twice progressed from the European Tour Qualifying School in 2014 and 2015. In 2015 he finished tied 3rd in Hong Kong Open and in 2016 he finished 3rd in the ISPS Handa Perth International, both co-sanctioned by the European Tour, and tied 4th in the Australian Open. After his first professional victory, the NSW Open Championship in November 2017 at Twin Creeks Golf & Country Club, New South Wales, Australia, he advanced to 183rd on the Official World Golf Ranking and finished 6th on the 2017–18 Australasia Order of Merit.

In February 2019, he advanced to a career best 125th on the Official World Golf Ranking. After seven top-10s, he finished the 2019 European Tour Race to Dubai in 32nd position with €1,018,789 in prize money.

Scrivener's best result on the European Tour came in 2021 at the Abu Dhabi HSBC Championship. A final round 66 saw him jump up the leaderboard on the final day into solo second place. He pocketed €710,175 in prize money with this result.

After a tied 23rd finish at the PGA Championship in May 2021, Scrivener advanced to a career best at the time; 111th on the Official World Golf Ranking.

== Amateur wins ==
- 2007 Australian Boys' Amateur, Mastercard Junior Masters
- 2009 New South Wales Medal (tied with Kyle Grant and Lincoln Tighe), Western Australian Amateur
- 2010 Mandurah Easter Amateur (Australia)

== Professional wins (1) ==
=== PGA Tour of Australasia wins (1) ===
No.	Date	Tournament	Winning score	Margin of victory	Runner-up
1	19 Nov 2017	NSW Open	−24 (64-69-66-65=264)	6 strokes	(Australia) Lucas Herbert

== Results in major championships ==
Tournament	2018	2019	2020	2021	2022	2023	2024
Masters Tournament							
PGA Championship				T23			
U.S. Open	CUT						CUT
The Open Championship			NT	CUT	T53		

Did not play

CUT = missed the half-way cut
"T" = tied
NT = no tournament due to COVID-19 pandemic

== Results in World Golf Championships ==
Tournament	2018	2019	2020	2021
Championship				T41
Match Play			NT^{1}	
Invitational				
Champions	T54		NT^{1}	NT^{1}

^{1}Cancelled due to COVID-19 pandemic

Did not play

NT = No tournament
"T" = Tied

== Team appearances ==
Amateur

- Sloan Morpeth Trophy (representing Australia): 2008 (winners), 2010 (winners)

== See also ==
- 2014 European Tour Qualifying School graduates
- 2015 European Tour Qualifying School graduates
