= Jake Higginbottom =

Australian professional golfer (born 1993)

Personal information
- Nationality: Australia
- Born: 15 October 1993 (age 33)

Career
- Sport: Golf
- Turned professional: 2012
- Current tours: Asian Tour; PGA Tour of Australasia
- Former tours: OneAsia Tour eGolf Professional Tour
- Professional wins: 2

Number of wins by tour
- PGA Tour of Australasia: 1
- Other: 1

Jake Higginbottom (born 15 October 1993) is an Australian professional golfer.

== Career ==
In 2012, Higginbottom won Australia's second-oldest amateur golf tournament, the Riversdale Cup.

On 25 November 2012, Higginbottom became the first amateur in more than half a century to win the BMW New Zealand Open. He turned professional two days later.

== Amateur wins ==
- 2010 New South Wales Amateur, China Amateur Open
- 2011 Queensland Amateur, Keperra Bowl, Handa Junior Masters
- 2012 Riversdale Cup

== Professional wins (2) ==
=== PGA Tour of Australasia wins (1) ===
No.	Date	Tournament	Winning score	Margin of victory	Runners-up
1	25 Nov 2012	BMW New Zealand Open (as an amateur)	−7 (72-70-72-67=281)	1 stroke	(Australia) Jason Norris, (Australia) Peter Wilson

=== eGolf Professional Tour wins (1) ===
No.	Date	Tournament	Winning score	Margin of victory	Runner-up
1	18 Jul 2014	Cabarrus Classic	−17 (71-63-65=199)	1 stroke	(United States) Jesse Hutchins

== Team appearances ==
Amateur

- Nomura Cup (representing Australia): 2011 (winners)
- Bonallack Trophy (representing Asia/Pacific): 2012
- Sloan Morpeth Trophy (representing Australia): 2012
- Australian Men's Interstate Teams Matches (representing New South Wales): 2010, 2011, 2012 (winners)
