= 1966 Eisenhower Trophy =

Coordinates: 19.278°N 99.159°W

Tournament information
- Dates: October 27–30
- Location: Mexico City, Mexico
- Course: Club de Golf Mexico
- Format: 72 holes stroke play

Statistics
- Par: 72
- Length: 7,125 yards (6,515 m)
- Field: 32 teams 128 players

Champion
- Australia; Harry Berwick, Phil Billings, Kevin Donohoe & Kevin Hartley
- 877 (+13)

The 1966 Eisenhower Trophy took place October 27 to 30 at the Club de Golf Mexico in Mexico City, Mexico. It was the fifth World Amateur Team Championship for the Eisenhower Trophy. The tournament was a 72-hole stroke play team event with 32 four-man teams. The best three scores for each round counted towards the team total.

Australia won the Eisenhower Trophy for the second time, finishing two strokes ahead of the silver medalists, United States. Great Britain and Ireland finished four strokes behind the United States and took the bronze medal while South Africa finished fourth. Ronnie Shade, representing Great Britain and Ireland, was the leading individual with a score of 283, 5 under par, seven strokes better than Patrick Cros from France.

== Teams ==
32 four-man teams contested the event.

Country	Players
Australia	Harry Berwick, Phil Billings, Kevin Donohoe, Kevin Hartley
Belgium	Jaques Moerman, Paul Rolin, Fredric Rodesch, Philippe Toussaint
Bermuda	Ford Hutchings, Brendam Ingham, Lois Moniz, Richard S.L. Pearman
Brazil	Humberto C. de Ameida, Robert Falkenburg, Mario Gonzalez Jr, Carlos A. Sozio
Canada	Keith Alexander, Gary Cowan, Douglas Silverberg, Nick Weslock
Chile	Guy Barroilhet, Mauricio Galeno, Eric van der Valk, Jaime R. Vergara
Republic of China	Chen Chien-chin, Ho Ming-chung, Hsu Sheng-san, Shay Yee-shone
Denmark	Klaus Hove, John Jacobsen, Nils Elsøe Jensen, Niels Thygesen, Ole Pfeiffer
Dominican Republic	Ramon Baez, Dionisio Bernal, Jack Corrie, Bernardo Pichardo
France	Patrick Cros, Herve Frayssineau, Alex Godillot, Gaëtan Mourgue D'Algue
Great Britain & Ireland	Michael Bonallack, Gordon Cosh, Ronnie Shade, Peter Townsend
Guatemala	Angel Arturo Casellas, Juan José Hermosilla, Mario Perez, Adolfo Rios
Iceland	Magnus Gudmundsson, Th Kjerbo, O.B. Ragnarsson, Ottar Yngvasson
India	Ashok S. Malik, S.S. Malik, Ashok Mehra, P. G. Sethi
Italy	Franco Bevione, Angelo Croce, Alberto Schiaffino, Lorenzo Silva
Jamaica	Lindy Delapenha, M.S. Elder, H.E.T. McDonald Jr, I. Sturdy
Japan	Yoshikane Hirose, Ginjiro Nakabe, Shohei Nishida, Akihiro Teramoto
Mexico	Juan Antonio Estrada, Roberto Halpern, Tomás Lehmann, Agustin Silveyra
New Zealand	John Durry, Stuart Jones, Ross Murray, Bruce Stevens
Peru	Maxwell Cooper, Miguel Grau, Ricardo Hernandez, Fernando de Osma
Philippines	Emil G. Gaston, Manuel J. Gonzalez, Alejandro Montelibano, Luis F. Silverio
Puerto Rico	Richard Bernhard, John Keith Clark, Fred W. Thon, Juan N. Torruella
Rhodesia	Douglas Black, Peter J. Matkovich, Michael J. Reinders, Robert W. White
South Africa	Bobby Cole, Comrie du Toit, John Fourie, Dave Symons
Spain	Duke of Fernán-Núñez, Alvaro Rezola, José Gancedo, Alvaro Muro
Sweden	Hans Hedjerson, Thure Holmström, Claes Jöhncke, Magnus Lindberg
Switzerland	Otto F. Dillier, Peter Gutermann, Rudolf Müller, Michael Rey
United States	Deane Beman, Ron Cerrudo, Downing Gray, Bob Murphy
Uruguay	Orlin Jacobson, Victor Paullier, Pablo Paullier, Peter Stanham
Venezuela	Jacques Alexander Jr, Fernan Frias Jack Strange, Alirio Yanes
West Germany	Walter Brühne, Friedrich-Carl Janssen, Peter Jochums, Christian Strenger
Zambia	Malcolm Cordukes, John F. Drysdale, Simon Hobday, Ken Treloar

== Scores ==
Place	Country	Score	To par
1st place, gold medalist(s)	Australia	214-221-223-219=877	+13
2nd place, silver medalist(s)	United States	226-217-220-216=879	+15
3rd place, bronze medalist(s)	Great Britain & Ireland	228-215-223-217=883	+19
4	South Africa	220-222-215-227=884	+20
5	Mexico	230-216-221-222=889	+25
6	Canada	223-222-225-220=890	+26
7	Chinese Taipei	225-224-221-222=892	+28
8	Japan	228-224-226-216=894	+30
9	West Germany	224-228-223-225=900	+36
T10	Italy	230-221-228-226=905	+41
T10	New Zealand	222-224-229-230=905	+41
T12	France	229-224-225-230=908	+44
T12	Sweden	226-226-229-227=908	+44
14	Chile	225-230-227-227=909	+45
15	Belgium	232-221-232-227=912	+48
16	Rhodesia	223-234-226-232=915	+51
17	India	221-227-229-239=916	+52
18	Zambia	228-242-227-232=929	+65
19	Brazil	235-230-233-234=932	+68
20	Philippines	229-239-234-236=938	+74
21	Guatemala	231-240-229-239=939	+75
22	Spain	234-230-240-236=940	+76
23	Bermuda	236-239-234-238=947	+83
24	Venezuela	232-239-241-238=950	+86
25	Switzerland	239-240-239-234=952	+88
26	Jamaica	242-236-246-232=956	+92
27	Denmark	237-243-234-243=957	+93
28	Uruguay	242-239-243-234=958	+94
29	Peru	246-239-254-244=983	+119
30	Iceland	262-251-258-253=1024	+160
31	Dominican Republic	268-260-254-251=1033	+169
32	Puerto Rico	272-272-273-253=1070	+206

== Individual leaders ==
There was no official recognition for the lowest individual scores.

Place	Player	Country	Score	To par
1	Ronnie Shade	Great Britain & Ireland	74-69-72-68=283	−5
2	Patrick Cros	France	71-71-72-76=290	+2
T3	Deane Beman	United States	76-73-73-69=291	+3
T3	Ginjiro Nakabe	Japan	76-73-73-69=291	+3
5	Bob Murphy	United States	74-71-74-73=292	+4
6	P. G. Sethi	India	75-70-73-75=293	+5
T7	Phil Billings	Australia	72-74-74-74=294	+6
T7	Angelo Croce	Italy	76-70-74-74=294	+6
T9	Harry Berwick	Australia	74-75-74-72=295	+7
T9	Walter Brühne	West Germany	74-73-73-75=295	+7
T9	Gary Cowan	Canada	75-73-75-72=295	+7
T9	Roberto Halpern	Mexico	76-71-73-75=295	+7
T9	Dave Symons	South Africa	75-75-70-75=295	+7
T9	Bob White	Rhodesia	73-75-75-72=295	+7
