= Eisenhower Trophy =

Amateur team golf tournament

The Eisenhower Trophy (World Men's Amateur Team Championships) is the biennial World Amateur Team Championship for men organized by the International Golf Federation. Since the tournament was first played in 1958, it is named after Dwight D. Eisenhower, the President of the United States at the time, who was a keen amateur golfer. From 2023, the field has been restricted to 36 teams, qualified through different criteria.

The equivalent competition for women is the Espirito Santo Trophy.

== Results ==
Year	Location	Venue(s)	Winners	Silver medalists	Bronze medalists	Teams
1958	St Andrews, Fife, Scotland	Old Course at St Andrews	Australia (918); Doug Bachli; Bruce Devlin; Bob Stevens; Peter Toogood	United States (918); Charles Coe; Bill Hyndman; Billy Joe Patton; Bud Taylor	Great Britain & Ireland (919); Joe Carr; Reid Jack; Arthur Perowne; Guy Wolstenholme	29
1960	Ardmore, Pennsylvania	Merion Golf Club	United States (834); Deane Beman; Robert W. Gardner; Bill Hyndman; Jack Nicklaus	Australia (876); Ted Ball; Jack Coogan; Bruce Devlin; Eric Routley	Great Britain & Ireland (881); Michael Bonallack; Joe Carr; Doug Sewell; Guy Wolstenholme	32
1962	Itō, Shizuoka, Japan	Kawana Hotel	United States (854); Deane Beman; Labron Harris Jr. Billy Joe Patton; R. H. Sikes	Canada (862); Gary Cowan; Bill Wakeham; Nick Weslock; Bob Wylie	Great Britain & Ireland (874); Michael Bonallack; Martin Christmas; Sandy Saddler; Ronnie Shade	23
1964	Rome, Italy	Olgiata Golf Club	Great Britain & Ireland (895); Michael Bonallack; Rodney Foster; Michael Lunt; Ronnie Shade	Canada (897); Keith Alexander; Gary Cowan; Douglas Silverberg; Nick Weslock	New Zealand (900); John Durry; Stuart Jones; Ted McDougall; Ross Murray	33
1966	Mexico City, Mexico	Club de Golf Mexico	Australia (877); Harry Berwick; Phil Billings; Kevin Donohoe; Kevin Hartley	United States (879); Deane Beman; Ron Cerrudo; Downing Gray; Bob Murphy	Great Britain & Ireland (883); Michael Bonallack; Gordon Cosh; Ronnie Shade; Peter Townsend	32
1968	Black Rock, Victoria, Australia	Royal Melbourne Golf Club	United States (868); Bruce Fleisher; Vinny Giles; Jack Lewis Jr. Dick Siderowf	Great Britain & Ireland (869); Michael Bonallack; Gordon Cosh; Peter Oosterhuis; Ronnie Shade	Canada (885); Gary Cowan; Jim Doyle; John Johnston; Bob Wylie	26
1970	Madrid, Spain	Real Club de la Puerta de Hierro	United States (857); Vinny Giles; Tom Kite; Allen Miller; Lanny Wadkins	New Zealand (869); Geoff Clarke; Stuart Jones; Ted McDougall; Ross Murray	South Africa (870); Hugh Baiocchi; John Fourie; Dale Hayes; Dave Symons	36
1972	Buenos Aires, Argentina	Olivos Golf Club	United States (865); Ben Crenshaw; Vinny Giles; Mark Hayes; Marty West	Australia (870); Mike Cahill; Terry Gale; Tony Gresham; Noel Ratcliffe	South Africa (878); Coen Dreyer; Johann Murray; Kevin Suddards; Neville Sundelson	32
1974	La Romana, Dominican Republic	Casa de Campo	United States (888); George Burns; Gary Koch; Jerry Pate; Curtis Strange	Japan (898); Ginjiro Nakabe; Tsutomu Irie; Tetsuo Sakata; Satoshi Yamazaki	Brazil (901); Priscillo Diniz; Jaime Gonzalez; Rafael Navarro; Ricardo Rossi	35
1976	Portimão, Algarve, Portugal	Penina Golf Club	Great Britain & Ireland (892); John Davies; Ian Hutcheon; Michael Kelley; Steve Martin	Japan (894); Ginjiro Nakabe; Micho Mori; Tetsuo Sakata; Masahiro Kuramoto	Australia (897); Chris Bonython; Tony Gresham; Colin Kaye; Phil Wood	38
1978	Navua, Viti Levu, Fiji	Pacific Harbour Golf & Country Club	United States (873); Bobby Clampett; John Cook; Scott Hoch; Jay Sigel	Canada (886); Gary Cowan; Dave Mick; Doug Roxburgh; Yves Tremblay	Australia (891); Chris Bonython; Tony Gresham; Peter Sweeney; Phil Wood	24
1980	Pinehurst, North Carolina	Pinehurst Country Club	United States (848); Jim Holtgrieve; Jay Sigel; Hal Sutton; Bob Tway	South Africa (875); Etienne Groenewald; Duncan Lindsay-Smith; Wayne Player; David Suddards	Chinese Taipei (884); Chang Dong-liang; Chen Tze-chung; Wu Chun-lung; Yuan Ching-chi	39
1982	Lausanne, Switzerland	Golf Club de Lausanne	United States (859); Nathaniel Crosby; Jim Holtgrieve; Bob Lewis; Jay Sigel	Japan (866); Kazuhiko Kato; Masayuki Naito; Kiyotaka Oie; Tetsuo Sakata; Sweden (866); Per Andersson; Krister Kinell; Magnus Persson; Ove Sellberg	(No bronze medals awarded)	30
1984	Fanling, Hong Kong	Royal Hong Kong Golf Club	Japan (870); Kazuhiko Kato; Noriaki Kimura; Kiyotaka Oie; Tetsuo Sakata	United States (877); John Inman; Jay Sigel; Randy Sonnier; Scott Verplank	Philippines (879); Guillermo Ababa; Antolin Fernando; Robert Pactolerin; Carito Villaroman	38
1986	Caracas, Venezuela	Lagunita Country Club	Canada (838); Mark Brewer; Brent Franklin; Jack Kay Jr. Warren Sye	United States (841); Buddy Alexander; Billy Andrade; Bob Lewis; Jay Sigel	Chinese Taipei (849); Chen Yun-mao; Hsieh Chin-sheng; Lin Chie-hsiang; Lin Chin-cheng	39
1988	Stockholm, Sweden	Ullna Golf Club	Great Britain & Ireland (882); Peter McEvoy; Garth McGimpsey; Jim Milligan; Eoghan O'Connell	United States (887); Kevin Johnson; Eric Meeks; Jay Sigel; Danny Yates	Australia (895); David Ecob; Bradley Hughes; Lester Peterson; Shane Robinson	39
1990	Christchurch, New Zealand	Christchurch Golf Club	Sweden (879); Klas Eriksson; Mathias Grönberg; Gabriel Hjertstedt; Per Nyman	New Zealand (892); Steven Alker; Michael Long; Grant Moorhead; Brent Paterson; United States (892); Allen Doyle; David Duval; David Eger; Phil Mickelson	(No bronze medals awarded)	33
1992	Vancouver, Canada	Capilano Golf & Country Club; Marine Drive Golf Club	New Zealand (823); Michael Campbell; Grant Moorhead; Stephen Scahill; Phil Tataurangi	United States (830); Allen Doyle; David Duval; Justin Leonard; Jay Sigel	Australia (842); David Armstrong; Steve Collins; Stephen Leaney; Lucas Parsons; France (842); Grégoire Brizay; Christian Cévaër; Sébastien Delagrange; Frédéric Cupillard	49
1994	Versailles, France	Le Golf National (Albatros course); La Boulie (La Vallée course)	United States (838); Todd Demsey; Allen Doyle; John Harris; Tiger Woods	Great Britain & Ireland (849); Warren Bennett; Stephen Gallacher; Lee S. James; Gordon Sherry	Sweden (855); Kalle Brink; Eric Carlberg; Freddie Jacobson; Mikael Lundberg	44
1996	Carmona, Philippines	Manila Southwoods Golf & Country Club; Masters and Legends courses	Australia (838); Jamie Crow; David Gleeson; Jarrod Moseley; Brett Partridge	Sweden (849); Martin Erlandsson; Chris Hanell; Daniel Olsson; Leif Westerberg	Spain (851); Sergio García; Ivó Giner; José Manuel Lara; Álvaro Salto	47
1998	Santiago, Chile	Club de Golf Los Leones; Club de Golf La Dehesa	Great Britain & Ireland (852); Luke Donald; Paddy Gribben; Lorne Kelly; Gary Wolstenholme	Australia (856); Aaron Baddeley; Kim Felton; Brendan Jones; Brett Rumford	Chinese Taipei (858); Chan Yih-shin; Hong Chia-yuh; Lee Cho-chuan; Su Chin-jung	52
2000	Bad Saarow, Germany	Sporting Club Berlin; Faldo and Palmer courses	United States (841); Ben Curtis; David Eger; Bryce Molder; Jeff Quinney	Great Britain & Ireland (857); Paul Casey; Luke Donald; Jamie Donaldson; Steven O'Hara	Australia (858); Aaron Baddeley; Scott Gardiner; Brad Lamb; Andrew Webster	59
2002	Kuala Lumpur, Malaysia	Saujana Golf and Country Club; Palm and Bunga Raya courses	United States (568); Ricky Barnes; Hunter Mahan; D. J. Trahan	France (571); Grégory Bourdy; Eric Chaudouet; Raphaël Pellicioli	Australia (574); Andrew Buckle; Marcus Fraser; Adam Groom; Philippines (574); Jerome Delariarte; Juvic Pagunsan; Angelo Que	63
2004	Río Grande, Puerto Rico	Rio Mar Country Club; River and Ocean courses	United States (407); Spencer Levin; Ryan Moore; Lee Williams	Spain (416); Rafa Cabrera-Bello; Alfredo García-Heredia; Álvaro Quirós	Sweden (417); Kalle Edberg; Oscar Florén; Alex Norén	66
2006	Stellenbosch, South Africa	De Zalze Golf Club; Stellenbosch Golf Club	Netherlands (554); Wil Besseling; Joost Luiten; Tim Sluiter	Canada (556); James Love; Andrew Parr; Richard Scott	United States (557); Chris Kirk; Jonathan Moore; Trip Kuehne	70
2008	Adelaide, Australia	Royal Adelaide Golf Club; The Grange Golf Club (West course)	Scotland (560); Wallace Booth; Gavin Dear; Callum Macaulay	United States (569); Rickie Fowler; Billy Horschel; Jamie Lovemark	Sweden (574); Jesper Kennegård; Henrik Norlander; Pontus Widegren	65
2010	Buenos Aires, Argentina	Buenos Aires Golf Club; Olivos Golf Club	France (423); Alexander Lévy; Johann Lopez-Lazaro; Romain Wattel	Denmark (427); Lucas Bjerregaard; Joachim B. Hansen; Morten Ørum Madsen	United States (428); David Chung; Scott Langley; Peter Uihlein	69
2012	Antalya, Turkey	Antalya Golf Club (PGA Sultan course); Cornelia Golf Club (Faldo course)	United States (404); Steven Fox; Justin Thomas; Chris Williams	Mexico (409); Rodolfo Cazaubón; Carlos Ortiz; Sebastián Vázquez	France (413); Paul Barjon; Julien Brun; Édouard España; Germany (413); Moritz Lampert; Max Rottluff; Marcel Schneider; South Korea (413); Kim Si-woo; Lee Chang-woo; Lee Soo-min	72
2014	Karuizawa, Japan	Karuizawa 72 Golf East; Iriyama and Oshitate courses	United States (534); Bryson DeChambeau; Beau Hossler; Denny McCarthy	Canada (536); Corey Conners; Taylor Pendrith; Adam Svensson	Spain (537); Daniel Berna; Mario Galiano; Jon Rahm	67
2016	Riviera Maya, Mexico	Mayakoba El Camaleón Golf Club; Iberostar Playa Paraiso Golf Club	Australia (534); Cameron Davis; Harrison Endycott; Curtis Luck	England (553); Jamie Bower; Scott Gregory; Alfie Plant	Austria (554); Michael Ludwig; Markus Maukner; Matthias Schwab; Ireland (554); Stuart Grehan; Jack Hume; Paul McBride	71
2018	Kildare, Ireland	Carton House Golf Club; Montgomerie and O'Meara courses	Denmark (541); John Axelsen; Nicolai Højgaard; Rasmus Højgaard	United States (542); Cole Hammer; Collin Morikawa; Justin Suh	Spain (544); Alejandro del Rey; Ángel Hidalgo; Víctor Pastor	72
2020	Singapore originally Hong Kong	Tanah Merah Country Club; Sentosa Golf Club originally Hong Kong Golf Club	Canceled due to COVID-19 pandemic			
2022	Paris, France	Le Golf National; Golf de Saint-Nom-la-Bretèche	Italy (541); Pietro Bovari; Filippo Celli; Marco Florioli	Sweden (542); Ludvig Åberg; Tobias Jonsson; Adam Wallin	United States (545); Austin Greaser; Gordon Sargent; Michael Thorbjornsen	71
2023	Abu Dhabi, UAE	Abu Dhabi Golf Club	United States (540); Nick Dunlap; David Ford; Gordon Sargent	Norway (551); Mats Ege; Michael Mjaaseth; Herman Sekne; Australia (551); Jack Buchanan; Jeffrey Guan; Karl Vilips	(No bronze medals awarded)	36
2025	Singapore	Tanah Merah Country Club (Tampines Course)	South Africa (547); Charl Barnard; Daniel Bennett; Christiaan Maas	Australia (555); Harry Takis; Billy Dowling; Declan O'Donovan	England (557); Eliot Baker; Tyler Weaver; Charlie Forster	36

The 1958 championship resulted in a tie. There was an 18-hole playoff which Australia won with a score of 222 to the United States 224.

From 1958 to 2000 the teams had four players with the best three scores counting for each round. From 2002 the teams have been three players with two counting. The 2004, 2010 and 2012 championships were reduced to 54 holes because of bad weather.

Players who have featured in a winning Eisenhower Trophy team and later became leading professional golfers include: Jack Nicklaus, Bruce Fleisher, Tom Kite, Lanny Wadkins, Ben Crenshaw, Curtis Strange, Scott Hoch, Hal Sutton, Michael Campbell, Tiger Woods, Ben Curtis, Luke Donald, Justin Thomas and Bryson DeChambeau.

== Results summary ==
Country	Win	2nd	3rd	Total	Competed
United States	16	9	3	27	33
Australia	4	4	6	14	33
Great Britain & Ireland	4	3	4	11	22
Canada	1	5	1	7	32
Sweden	1	3	3	7	32
Japan	1	3		4	33
New Zealand	1	2	1	4	33
France	1	1	2	4	32
South Africa	1	1	2	4	28
Denmark	1	1		2	27
Italy	1			1	33
Netherlands	1			1	30
Scotland	1			1	10
Spain		1	3	4	32
England		1	1	2	11
Mexico		1		1	31
Chinese Taipei			3	3	31
Philippines			2	2	24
Austria			1	1	28
Brazil			1	1	32
Germany			1	1	33
Ireland			1	1	11
South Korea			1	1	27
Totals	34	35	36	104	33

There were joint silver medalists (and no bronze medalists) in 1982 and 1990. There were joint bronze medalists in 1992, 2002, 2012 (3) and 2016.

The "Great Britain and Ireland" team represented the two separate independent countries of the United Kingdom and the Republic of Ireland from 1958 to 2000. From 2002, England, Scotland, Wales, and Ireland (a combined Republic of Ireland and Northern Ireland team) have competed as separate teams.

== Individual leader ==
Year	Individual leader	Country	Score	To par	Margin of victory	Runner(s)-up
1958	Bruce Devlin; Bill Hyndman; Reid Jack	Australia; United States; Great Britain & Ireland	81-73-74-73=301; 79-77-73-72=301; 72-77-74-78=301	+13	Tie	
1960	Jack Nicklaus	United States	66-67-68-68=269	−11	13 strokes	(United States) Deane Beman
1962	Gary Cowan	Canada	68-71-72-69=280	E	3 strokes	(United States) R. H. Sikes
1964	Hsieh Min-Nan	Chinese Taipei	72-77-72-73=294	+6	1 stroke	(Argentina) Raul Travieso
1966	Ronnie Shade	Great Britain & Ireland	74-69-72-68=283	−5	7 strokes	(France) Patrick Cros
1968	Michael Bonallack; Vinny Giles	Great Britain & Ireland; United States	72-72-66-76=286; 74-68-71-73=286	−6	Tie	
1970	Victor Regalado	Mexico	72-67-71-70=280	−8	3 strokes	(South Africa) Dale Hayes
1972	Tony Gresham	Australia	70-69-73-73=285	+1	2 strokes	(United States) Ben Crenshaw (United States) Vinny Giles
1974	Jaime Gonzalez; Jerry Pate	Brazil; United States	73-74-74-73=294; 73-77-73-71=294	+6	Tie	
1976	Chen Tze-ming; Ian Hutcheon	Chinese Taipei; Great Britain & Ireland	75-69-73-76=293; 73-73-76-71=293	+1	Tie	
1978	Bobby Clampett	United States	69-71-71-76=287	−1	2 strokes	(Canada) Doug Roxburgh
1980	Hal Sutton	United States	68-69-71-68=276	−12	6 strokes	(Chinese Taipei) Chen Tze-chung
1982	Luis Carbonetti	Argentina	69-69-74-72=284	−4	1 stroke	(United States) Jay Sigel
1984	Luis Carbonetti; Tetsuo Sakata	Argentina; Japan	68-74-70-74=286; 68-72-74-72=286	−2	Tie	
1986	Eduardo Herrera	Colombia	75-67-68-65=275	−5	2 strokes	(Canada) Mark Brewer (United States) Jay Sigel
1988	Peter McEvoy	Great Britain & Ireland	72-71-70-71=284	−4	6 strokes	(Australia) David Ecob
1990	Mathias Grönberg	Sweden	70-67-77-72=286	−2	6 strokes	(Sweden) Gabriel Hjertstedt
1992	Phil Tataurangi	New Zealand	67-67-68-69=271	−9	1 stroke	(New Zealand) Michael Campbell
1994	Allen Doyle	United States	68-70-69-70=277	−10	4 strokes	(United Kingdom) & (Republic of Ireland) Warren Bennett
1996	Kalle Aitala	Finland	67-68-72-69=276	−12	2 strokes	(Japan) Takahiro Nakagawa (Australia) Brett Partridge (South Korea) Seo Jong-hyun
1998	Kim Felton	Australia	70-67-69-69=275	−11	2 strokes	(Finland) Mikko Ilonen
2000	Bryce Molder	United States	69-71-65-68=273	−15	4 strokes	(United Kingdom) & (Republic of Ireland) Paul Casey
2002	Marcus Fraser	Australia	74-70-67-70=281	−7	1 stroke	(France) Grégory Bourdy
2004	Ryan Moore	United States	65-67-72=204	−12	2 strokes	(United States) Spencer Levin
2006	Wil Besseling	Netherlands	69-70-66-70=275	−13	1 stroke	(France) Julien Grillon (United States) Chris Kirk (Canada) Richard Scott
2008	Rickie Fowler	United States	68-67-70-75=280	−10	2 strokes	(Scotland) Callum Macaulay (Canada) Nick Taylor
2010	Joachim B. Hansen	Denmark	67-69-73=209	−6	3 strokes	(France) Alexander Lévy
2012	Sebastián Vázquez	Mexico	66-67-66=199	−15	1 stroke	(United States) Chris Williams
2014	Jon Rahm	Spain	70-64-62-67=263	−23	3 strokes	(Australia) Lucas Herbert (France) Victor Perez (Argentina) Alejandro Tosti
2016	Cameron Davis	Australia	67-66-68-68=269	−17	2 strokes	(Australia) Curtis Luck
2018	Alejandro del Rey	Spain	70-64-68-65=267	−23	1 stroke	(Japan) Takumi Kanaya
2022	Tobias Jonsson	Sweden	67-72-64-66=269	−17	1 stroke	(Japan) Taiga Semikawa
2023	Kazuma Kobori	New Zealand	70-70-67-65=272	−16	1 stroke	(United States) Nick Dunlap
2025	Christiaan Maas	South Africa	66-66-65-69=266	−22	10 strokes	(Australia) Declan O'Donovan

== Future site ==
- 2027 Royal Golf Dar Es Salam, Morocco
