= Bob Tuohy =

Australian professional golfer

Personal information
- Nationality: Australia
- Born: 1 August 1940 (age 86)

Career
- Sport: Golf
- Turned professional: 1958
- Current tour: PGA Tour of Australia
- Professional wins: 7

Bob Tuohy (born c. August 1940) is a former Australian professional golfer and current tournament director.

== Early life ==
At the age of 11, Tuohy became a junior member of Glenelg Golf Club. He was the youngest member at the time. He first received media attention shortly after turning 13. He qualified for the Legacy Golf Governor's Cup held at Glenelg Golf Club. That year he also began representing South Australia at schoolboy championships in Sydney. By April he had cut his handicap to 12. In June, he made the C grade competition at Glenelg. He was the youngest player ever to reach the final. By August, his handicap dropped to 8. Later in the month, he won the B grade competition. The following two years, in 1955 and 1956, he was South Australia's state schoolboy champion.

== Amateur career ==
In 1957, he began playing in bigger events across South Australia. That year, Tuohy won the South Australian Amateur. Late in the year, he played the Victor Harbour Open Championship. It was a two-round event played over the course of one day, Monday 14 October. In the morning round, Tuohy shot a 74 to put him five behind leader Murray Crafter. In the afternoon, however, he fired a "sensational" final round 66, including seven birdies. It broke the tournament record and he defeated Crafter by one. Tuohy won the Barr-Smith Cup for his victory.

Though still an amateur, Tuohy played in several significant professional events in 1958. In April, he played the Adelaide Advertiser Tournament. Tuohy was in joint second place, five behind Kel Nagle, after the second round. In the third round, he shot a "brilliant" 67 to tie Nagle for the lead. However, Tuohy shot a 75 in the final round to finish two back, in solo third. Two months later Tuohy played the Great Southern Golf Championship at Victor Harbour Golf Club. In the morning round, "he played excellent golf," firing a 71. He putted poorly in the afternoon round, shooting a 76, but he managed a one-stroke win. In November, he played the five-round Pelaco Tournament at The Australian Golf Club. Well-known golfers like Peter Thomson, Gary Player, and Bruce Crampton played the event. Tuohy finished at 360 (+5), one behind the leading amateur Barry Warren.

Tuohy also had some success at amateur events in 1958. He successfully defended his South Australian Amateur Championship that year. In June, he also won Glengl's club championship at the age of 17.

== Professional career ==
On 9 November 1958, Tuohy turned professional. In 1960, he had much success in Western Australia. During the year he won the Western Australian Open by one stroke over Brian Henning at 291. He also won the Western Australia PGA Championship that year. In mid-August, he also had success in the state, winning a pairs event with Len Thomas at Lake Karrinyup Country Club. A few days later he began play at the Australian Open, also held at Lake Karrinyup. He opened with a 71 (−1), in a tie for fifth, leading the professionals. He shot over-par for the remainder of the tournament to finish in a tie for 21st. The following week Tuohy played the Australian PGA Championship held at Royal Fremantle Golf Club, also in Western Australia. He reached the quarterfinals, losing to Norman Von Nida. In November he played well at the Victorian Open. After three rounds he was at 213 (−3), in second place. Against "unrelenting heavy rain," however, he shot a final round 77 (+5) finished in a four-way tie for fourth, eight shots back.

In 1961, Tuohy played in tournaments across several continents. In January, he finished joint third at the East Rand Open in South Africa, three behind champion Jimmy Hitchcock at 282. Later in the year, Tuohy started playing in Europe. His first appearance on British PGA circuit was at the Northern Open in April. Tuohy played in Europe through the northern hemisphere summer.

By September he had returned to Australia. In October, he opened with a 76 (+4) at the Wills Classic. Though a high score, against "boisterous winds," he was in joint fourth place. He shot a second round 70 to move up to joint third. He closed with a 76, however, to finish solo ninth at 295 (+7), several shots behind champion Gary Player and one behind Arnold Palmer. The following month, he opened with a 72, even-par, at the 54-hole North Coast Open to put himself in contention, three back. He ultimately finished in joint third place, two back of champion Len Woodward. During the season, he was temporarily suspended by the Victorian PGA with fellow pro Colin McGregor. According to The Straits Times, they were suspended "for playing in exhibition matches and making sports stores appearances allegedly without permission." However, the ban was quickly lifted when several prominent players, including Peter Thomson and Kel Nagle, threatened to boycott the Victorian PGA Championship.

In January 1962, it was announced that Tuohy would play the inaugural season of the Far East Circuit. His top performance on the circuit was a fifth-place finish at the Hong Kong Open. In April, he moved on to Europe. Very quickly he seriously contended at a tournament, taking the first round lead at the Northern Open. In the second round, he shot an 80 but on the "wild and windy course" he still had the lead. He shot a third round 74 to maintain the solo lead. In the final round, playing well ahead of Tuohy, Scotsman John Panton scored a "magnificent" 69, the course record, to take the clubhouse lead. Tuohy, meanwhile, shot a 37 on the front nine and ultimately fell two behind Panton with two holes left. Playing severely downwind, Tuohy managed to birdie the par-5 17th to get within one. On the 72nd hole Tuohy had a chance to tie. His 12-yard birdie putt "hit the back of the hole and stayed out," however. With a final round 75, Tuohy finished at 301, one behind champion Panton. For the remainder of his tour of Europe, however, Tuohy would not have the same success. In June, at the one-day, two-round West of England event, he noticed at the end of the tournament he had an extra club in his bag. He was penalized two strokes per hole, 72 strokes in total, to ultimately finish nearly one hundred strokes behind champion Peter Alliss. In early July, he attempted to qualify for the 1962 Open Championship but did not succeed.

Shortly thereafter he returned to Australia. His erratic play continued. He often opened tournaments well but was unable to recording high placings. He opened the Australian Open with a 70 to put him one back of Gary Player's lead then a 71 to remain close. He struggled during the two-round final day, however, with rounds of 77 and 76 to finish in 15th place. Two weeks later, he attempted to qualify for the Australian PGA Championship. In the first qualifying round, he shot a "brilliant" 66, breaking the course record of Rossdale Golf Club, to ultimately lead the qualifiers. However, in the tournament proper, which was played as a match play event, he lost in the first round. Later in the month, he opened with a 69 (−3) at the North Coast Open to position himself one back of the lead. He did not seriously challenge during the final round, however.

Tuohy best performance of the 1962–63 season was at the Victorian PGA Championship in December. He entered the final round at 216 (−8), six back of the lead. He played the front nine well with an even-par 36, three better than leader Frank Phillips. He continued to play "great golf" on the back nine with a 35 (−3) to take the clubhouse lead at 287 (−9). On the 72nd hole, however, it looked to be over as he was two behind leader Kel Nagle and one behind his playing partner Frank Phillips. However, Phillips hit his tee shot on the par-3 hole in a flower bed. He made bogey to finish at 287 (−9) with Tuohy. Nagle, meanwhile, hit his first two shots in greenside bunkers. He ultimately had a 15-foot putt for bogey; if he missed there would be a three-way playoff between himself and Tuohy and Phillips. However, Nagle made the putt for a one-stroke win. Tuohy earlier missed a one-foot putt on the 16th which proved to be crucial.

In late 1962, it was announced that Tuohy would play the Far East Circuit again with nine other Australian golfers. In March 1963, he tied the course record at the Malaysian Open with a second round 66 (−8). He was in the joint lead with Bill Dunk at 137 (−11). In the third round, however, he "did not look at all impressive" with even-par 74; he ultimately finished in a tie for sixth, well behind champion Dunk. The following week, he played the Hong Kong Open. Among the players who made the cut, Tuohy "finished down the list" at 141 (−1), nine behind leader Hsieh Min-Nan. During the third round, however, he shot a 64 (−7), with five birdies and one eagle, to get within one of Hsieh's lead. He closed with a 73 (+2), though, to finish in a tie for seventh.

In late 1963, Tuohy had much success in New Zealand. In mid-September, he played the Roslyn Tournament in Dunedin. He entered the third and final round at 139 (−5), one back of Bruce Devlin and two back of leader Barry Coxon. The three players were "locked in a terrific struggle" and Coxon, though outplayed by Tuohy, was able to "hold on" and win. Tuohy, with a 70 (−2), finished one behind Coxon and one ahead of Devlin. In early October, he reached the finals of the New Zealand PGA Championship. There Tuohy defeated Walter Godfrey, 6 and 5, to win the event. In December, he started playing extensively in South Africa.

Tuohy had much success during the 1964–65 season in the Australasian region. In September, Tuohy opened with a 70 at the Victorian Open to hold the joint lead. He finished in the top ten. The following month, he played the Wagga City Open. He played poorly in the first three rounds and was not in contention entering the final round. However, he shot a final round 63 (−7), breaking the course record, to finish seventh. In November, he had success in the first round of the Australian PGA Championship shooting a 68 (−4) putting him two back of Eric Cremin's lead. He ultimately finished in solo fourth at 282 (−6). In November, he returned to New Zealand. While preparing for the New Zealand Open he shot a "spectacular" 65 (−8) in practice including his first hole-in-one. The good play continued in the first round as he shot a 35 (−2) on the front nine to take the early lead and ultimately finished with a 71 (−2). He was in joint second place at this point. However, he was not near the lead as the tournament concluded. In December, he played excellently at the Wills Masters. He opened with an even-par 70, however, putting him in a tie for 17th, seven behind leader Ted Ball. However, he shot a second round 63 (−7) to tie the course record and take a one shot lead over Ball. "It's the best I've putted in years," Tuohy said afterwards. His round include seven birdies and an eagle. In the third round, he "struggled" to a 70 (E) and fell five shots behind Ball. During the final round, Tuohy was unable to make a comeback – shooting a 68, matching Ball's score – but still managed joint second with Barry Coxon. The next week, he played the BP Tournament at Titirangi Golf Course in Auckland, New Zealand. Tuohy again set a course record, shooting an opening round 66 (−6), breaking the mark established by Peter Thomson nine years ago. He held a two stroke lead over John Sullivan. In the second round, he "slumped" to a 72 (E) but was only one back. He ultimately closed with an 81 (+9) and finished 20 shots behind Bill Dunk. Three weeks later, he nearly successfully defended his New Zealand PGA Championship, again finishing behind Barry Coxon in solo second.

As of 1966, Tuohy had moved to South Africa. During the late 1960s, he primarily played events in Africa though he occasionally played elsewhere. In August 1966, he finished in 7th place at the Engadine Open in St. Moritz, Switzerland. The following month, he played in the British Isles and Commonwealth verses Rest of the World matchplay event in Newcastle, England. Tuohy represented the Rest of the World. In a "surprise," Tuohy lost to 54-year-old Welshman Dai Rees in his singles match. Overall, his team lost to the Commonwealth team 15–9. As of early 1969, Tuohy still lived in South Africa. He lived in Durban during this time. In January 1969, Tuohy opened with a 70 (−4) at the South African Masters to put him near the lead. He "faltered" with a second round 72, however, putting him five shots behind Bobby Cole. He ultimately finished in joint second place, six behind Cole, tied with Tienie Britz. In April, he finished in joint fourth at the Kenya Open with Christy O'Connor Snr and Russel Meek. Tuohy earned 230 pounds for his efforts. In June, it was announced that he would be working with British golf manager Derrick Pillage. Tuohy would serve as a "liaison" for British golfers who intended to play in South Africa during the offseason. Tuohy would make arrangements for Brian Barnes, Bernard Gallacher, and Nick Job. The following year, Tuohy again placed high at the Kenya Open, finishing joint second in the 1970 edition.

In the early 1970s, Tuohy returned to Australia. During this era, he recorded several runner-up finishes in the Australasian region. In December 1970, he played excellently at the Garden City Classic at Russley Golf Club. In the third round, Tuohy shot a 69 (−4) to reach 211 (−8) to move from joint fourth to solo second place. Despite the good play, he was nine shots behind runaway leader Peter Harvey. However, Harvey "crashed" with several bogeys on the final day and Tuohy had a chance to win on the back nine. However, Tuohy's "undoing" was on the par-3 15th as he made bogey. Overall he finished at 281 (−11), in joint second with Bob Charles, two behind champion Harvey. In September 1971, he played the South Australian Open. Over the course of three rounds, Tuohy was at 216, just even par, but at the difficult Kooyonga Golf Club that was good for the joint lead with England's Guy Wolstenholme. During the final round's front nine, Tuohy outplayed Wolstenholme by two shots to take the solo lead. Shortly thereafter, however, Tuohy "blew up" with four dropped shots at the 10th, 11th, and 12th holes to fall behind Wolstenholme. Tuohy ultimately finished solo second, two behind.

During the 1972–73 season, Tuohy continued to record runner-up finishes. In October, at the New South Wales Open, he shot a second round 70 (−2) to put himself in joint second, two back of the lead held by Owen Beldham. In the third round, Tuohy shot even-par and, against Beldham's two-over par performance, was now tied. By the 10th hole of the final round, Tuohy had a two-stroke lead over Beldham and Sydney professional Tim Woolbank. The back nine would be a "neck-to-neck struggle" between the three golfers. Tuohy double-bogeyed the 14th hole to lose the lead. Beldham, meanwhile, "sealed the victory" with a 40-yard chip in on the 17th hole. Tuohy, with a 73 (+1), was ultimately outshot by three by Beldham and finished solo second, one ahead of Woolbank. Despite the loss, Tuohy collected the $A2,000 first prize because Beldham was an amateur. Later in the year, in December, Tuohy recorded another high finish, this time at the City of Auckland Classic. Entering the final round, Tuohy was tied for the lead with American George Archer, recent Masters champion. Australian Jack Newton played excellently on the front nine, however, and the final round would turn out to be a "three-man struggle" between these competitors. Newton made four consecutive birdies in the middle of the back nine – among nine he made in the round – to take the solo lead. Tuohy played "consistently" over the course of the round, with only one bogey against four birdies, but it wasn't enough as he again finished solo second, one back of Newton. In February 1973, Tuohy again held the 54-hole lead at a tournament. He was at 213 (−3) entering Sunday at the Victorian Open, two ahead of Stewart Ginn. He maintained the lead after nine holes but "the pressure of leadership finally cracked Tuohy's game" after the turn. He closed with bogeys on four of his final eight holes to finish joint second with Ginn, two back of champion Peter Thomson.

For the remainder of the mid-1970s, Tuohy recorded a handful of high finishes in notable international tournaments. A week after his 1973 runner-up in Victoria, he recorded a tie for fifth at the Tasmanian Open, three behind champion Stewart Ginn. In September 1973, he finished joint third at the West End Tournament, four back of champion David Galloway. The following May, at the two-round Kuzuha International in Japan, he opened with the lead and finished third. In August 1974, at the Air New Zealand Fiji Open, he shot a final round 68 (−4) to tie the course record and win. The following month, in a warm-up for the South Australian Open, he and David Galloway scored matching 70s (−2) to tie for the victory at the Rothman's pro-am. Tuohy ultimately finished in the top ten at the event proper.

=== Tournament director ===
During this era, Tuohy regarded himself as "only a 50 percent playing professional." He began working a variety of other jobs in the golf industry. As of August 1974, he worked as a co-ordinator for Trans Australia Airlines (TAA). Tuohy worked as a "sporting liaison" between the TAA and certain golf organizations to enhance these companies services. As of 1975, he was also doing work as a tournament organizer.

He still occasionally worked as a touring professional and recorded a few top performances in minor Australian events. In January 1975, he played a fourball event with Frank Phillips at Young Golf Club in Young, New South Wales. Their team held the lead entering the final round at 196 (−14). They shot a 67 (−3) in the fourth round but were caught by the teams of Noel Ratcliffe and Rodger Davis and Duncan Park and David Galloway. Park made a birdie putt on the second playoff hole to win it for his team. In 1976, he played excellently at the South Australian PGA Championship. He opened the first three rounds with 213 (−3) to take the lead entering the final round. He played poorly during the final round's front nine, with a 39, to fall back to the field. However, he shot a 33 on the back nine to win by one over Frank Phillips.

In the late 1970s, he started working exclusively in other golf-related jobs. His work with Trans Australia Airlines and as a tournament organizer took up much of his time. As of October 1976, he was the spokesman for the Australian PGA. In 1977, he formed Tuohy Associates, a tournament organizing business. The first tournament he organized was the West Lakes Classic. Over the course of the late 1970s, he began promoting other tournaments including the Australian PGA Championship, South Australian Open, and the Queensland Open. In the early 1980s, Tuohy remained director of the West Lakes Classic. During this era, he also started working as the tournament director of the New South Wales Open, Resch's Pilsner Tweed Classic, and Nedlands Masters. In 1984, he became tournament director the Australian Open for the first time. In 1987, he began preparations to host the ESP Open at Royal Canberra Golf Club for the following year. The intention was to have a prominent golf tournament at the nation's capital for the country's bicentennial celebrations. According to Tuohy, it had potential to "be the biggest tournament in Australia and one which can challenge the best in the world."

In the early 1990s, Tuohy started organizing for women's tournaments for the first time. In 1990, his business began organizing for the Australian Ladies Masters and, as of 1994, continued to host the event. In 1994, he also served as tournament director of the Women's Australian Open for the first time.

In the 21st century, Tuohy and Associates continued to host significant tournaments for both men and women. Most recently, in 2017, they hosted the ISPS Handa New Zealand Open.

== Personal life ==
As of 1975, Tuohy was married to Sue and has a son, Ben and daughter, Peppa. He lived in Adelaide at the time.

== Amateur wins ==
- 1957 South Australian Amateur
- 1958 South Australian Amateur

== Professional wins (7) ==
- 1957 Victor Harbour Open Championship
- 1958 Great Southern Golf Championship
- 1960 Western Australian Open, Western Australia PGA Championship
- 1965 New Zealand PGA Championship
- 1974 Air New Zealand Fiji Open
- 1976 South Australian PGA Championship

== Team appearances ==
Amateur

- Australian Men's Interstate Teams Matches (representing South Australia): 1956, 1957, 1958

Professional

- Rest of the World verses British Isles and Commonwealth matchplay (representing Rest of World): 1964
