= Barry Coxon =

Australian professional golfer (born 1940)

Personal information
- Nationality: Australia
- Born: 1940 (age 85–86) Lambton, New South Wales

Career
- Sport: Golf
- Turned professional: 1958
- Former tour: PGA Tour of Australia
- Professional wins: 8

Best results in major championships
- Masters Tournament: DNP
- PGA Championship: DNP
- U.S. Open: DNP
- The Open Championship: T18: 1967

Barry Coxon (born 1940) is an Australian professional golfer.

== Amateur career ==
Coxon grew up in Lambton, New South Wales. In the middle of 1954 Coxon started playing golf under the tutelage of his father Jim. He soon became a junior member at Muree Golf Club. Coxon first received media attention at the age of 14. He shot a 91 gross score at Muree's long-markers championship. He was noted for his "easy, graceful style." The Newcastle Sun reported that "more can be expected from him in the future." Later in the month he shot a net 90 to win the Muree Early Birds' Cup.

== Professional career ==
In the late 1950s Coxon turned professional. During this early stage of his career he was an apprentice of Norman Von Nida. In 1958, Coxon won an apprenticeship championship at St. Michael's Golf Club in Sydney, Australia. In June 1959 he became a junior member of the Australian PGA. Around this time he also started working at a driving range in Newcastle, New South Wales.

In December 1959 he media received attention for one of the first times as a professional. Coxon played the 1,000 pound Coca-Cola tournament at Royal Hobart Country Club in Tasmania. Coxon played excellently for the first three rounds and took a seven-stroke lead entering the final round. However, he played poorly in the final round and finished at 284, tied for second with Frank Phillips and Len Woodward, two back of champion Jack Sullivan. In February 1960, he played the pro purse at Monash Golf Club. It was among the first tournaments he played with top-notch professionals. He opened well with a 50-foot birdie chip at the 3rd hole. He then made an 8-foot birdie putt on the 5th hole. He three-putted the 6th hole for bogey but that was his "only mistake." He made two more birdies for a 69 (−3). He defeated Len Woodward, Frank Phillips, Colin McGregor, and John Sullivan by a stroke. He also defeated Kel Nagle by two strokes. He won 44 pounds. It was a surprise win as Coxon was "comparatively unknown." It was "his first success in a major tournament," according to The Sydney Morning Herald. In March 1961 he again received media coverage for his play at a notable tournament, this time at the New South Wales Open. He shot an opening round 70 (−2) to tie four other players for the lead, including Peter Thomson and Norman Von Nida. In the second round, however, he had "putter trouble," missing a number of short putts on the back nine. He shot a 77 (+5) to fall into a tie for fifteenth place, seven behind leader Thomson. He ultimately finished in solo 12th place.

Shortly thereafter he moved to New Zealand. In 1961 he became the club professional at Manuwatu Golf Club in Palmerston North, New Zealand. He still played in some notable tournaments, however. In late 1963, he played the Roslyn Tournament at Balmacewen Golf Course in Dunedin, New Zealand. He opened with rounds of 69 and 68 to take a one-stroke lead over Bruce Devlin. One round was cancelled due to rain. The third round would be the final round. Coxon was "locked in a terrific struggle" with Devlin and Bob Tuohy for the championship. Coxon, however, "was able to hold on" and win. With his 71 he finished at 208 (−8) to defeat Tuohy by one and Devlin by two. The following season he recorded two high results in notable New Zealand tournaments. In December 1964 he finished joint second at the Wills Classic with Tuohy, five behind champion Ted Ball. The following month he played the New Zealand PGA Championship. He won the tournament at 209, two better than runner-up Tuohy. By virtue of his good play he was selected to represent New Zealand at the 1965 Canada Cup to be held in Spain later in the year. He also earned entry into the Carling World Open, an elite international tournament held in the United States.

In September 1965 he gave up his club professional job to focus on tournament golf exclusively. He also moved back to Australia during this period. Because he moved back to Australia he was not able to represent New Zealand in the Canada Cup. He was "bitterly disappointed" by this setback. Nonetheless, he had much success during the 1965-66 golf season in Australia and New Zealand. In October he had much success at the two-round Rosenthal Riverland golf tournament in Adelaide, Australia. He opened with a 68 (−5) to tie a number of players for the lead. Entering the second round's back nine he remained tied for the lead with Brian Crafter. He then birdied four of the first six holes of the back nine "to ensure first prize," defeating Crafter and his brother Murray Crafter by four shots. He earned 150 pounds for the win. Later in the month he finished in solo 5th place at the Australian PGA Championship. In November he played the Metalcraft Tournament in Hamilton, New Zealand. He opened with a "mediocre" 74 (+2) to put him several shots back. However, he was in "fine form" during the two-round final day shooting a 69 (−3) followed by a "magnificent" 68 (−4). With his five-under-par 211 total he finished joint runner-up with Alan Murray, three behind champion Peter Thomson. The following week he played the two-day, four-round Wattie's Tournament in Hastings, New Zealand. Coxon played excellently in the first round, taking the lead. However he played poorly in the second round to fall to 139 (−1), in a tie for fifth place, four back of amateur Stuart Jones. In the third round Coxon shot an even-par 70 to fall further behind. However, in the final round he shot a "brilliant" 64 (−6) to move into solo third place, three behind champion Jones. It was the lowest round of the tournament and only one off the course record. In December he played the New Zealand Wills Masters at Russely Golf Club in Christchurch, New Zealand. He started well, making an eagle at the par-5 2nd hole. He played well thereafter and finished with a 69 (−4) to tie Geoff Donald for the lead. In the second round, however, he shot a 76 (+3) to fall significantly behind. He ultimately finished in a tie for twelfth. In January he continued his good play in New Zealand at the New Zealand PGA Championship at Mount Maunganui Golf Course. In the first round he scored seven birdies in a bogey-free round. His 66 (−7) set the course record and he took a two stroke lead over Frank Buckler. In the second round, however, he could only manage an even-par 73. He fell into a tie with Martin Roesink. He shot four-under-par for the remainder of tournament but was overtaken by Ross Newdick's final round 64 (−9), itself breaking Coxon's course record. Coxon finished at 281 (−11), one back of Newdick. By virtue of his good performances he earned entry into the Carling World Open, an elite international golf tournament held at Royal Birkdale Golf Club in England later in the year.

Shortly thereafter he moved on to the Asia Golf Circuit. Coxon opened well at the Philippine Open. Other than that, however, he did not receive much media attention. However, Coxon would play extensively in Asia for the remainder of the 1960s.

In May he moved onto the British PGA. It was his first experience playing the European circuit. The first tournament he played was the Penfold and Swallow Tournament. Despite "rain and chilly winds" Coxon played "magnificent golf" in the first round to shoot a 68 (−4). He was tied with Welshman Dave Thomas for the lead. He shot another 68 (−4) to move into the solo lead. In the third round, however, he shot a 73 (+1) to fall one stroke behind Englishman Bernard Hunt. In the final round, playing with Hunt, he "could not make his putter work." He shot a 78 (+6) and fell into a tie for seventh place. Despite the loss he garnered some interest from the press. After the tournament Bob Ferrier of The Observer stated, "...in the long-term much of the interest in a fine tournament lies perhaps in Coxon." The following week he played the Agfa-Gevaert Tournament in Stoke Park, England. In the first round he made the turn in 32 and had a "great chance" to match Daniel Talbot's lead. However, he scored a six at the 12th hole, "dashing his hopes" for the lead, and finished with a 68, four behind Talbot. He shot a 75 in the second round, however, to fall back. He ultimately finished in a tie for 17th. Later in the month he played the Martini International. He opened poorly with "5s" on the 3rd and 4th holes. However, he "played great golf" thereafter and finished with a 70 to put him in the top ten, two back. In the second round Coxon shot a 32 on the outward nine. Coming in "was a mixture of good and bad." He bogeyed the par-4 11th and 12th holes. He came back with birdie 2s at the par-3 13th and 17th. On the par-5 18th hole Coxon had a chance to break the course record of 68. However, he "hooked his approach into the deep rough" and made a bogey. Still his three-under-par 69 gave him a 139 (−5) total and tied him for the lead with Tony Jacklin. He closed with rounds of 71 and 72 to finish in a tie for seventh place. Later in the May he played the Blaxnit (Ulster) Tournament in Belfast, Northern Ireland. He opened with a 71 to tie for fourth place, three behind the lead. He had a "disastrous" second round, however, shooting a 78 and putting him nine behind the lead. On Saturday he closed with rounds of 74 and 72 to finish in a tie for 12th. For the next few weeks he struggled. The week after the event in Northern Ireland he played the Daks Tournament. There he missed the cut by a wide margin. Later in the month he produced "mediocre golf" at the Pringle of Scotland Tournament and missed the cut. During the first week of July he attempted to qualify for the 1966 Open Championship. In the first round of the two-round qualifying event at Gullane Golf Club he shot a "reasonable" 74. However, he was ultimately "eliminated in the qualifying round." Shortly thereafter he began to play better however. In mid-July he played the French Open. He shot a 67 in the second round, tying the round of the day. He ultimately recorded a high finish. The following week he played the Esso Round Robin tournament. In the third round he "had an unexpected win" over Englishman Peter Alliss. In early September he played the Carling World Open, "the richest tournament in Britain," the tournament he earned entry into back in May. Playing against an international field with a number of big names, Coxon finished at 293 (+1), in a tie for eighth place. Overall, it was considered a "promising tour" of Europe.

Shortly thereafter, he returned to Australia. In late September he played the Victorian Open. He recorded "a brilliant display" of golf, shooting three-under on each nine, for a 67 (−6). He held a three-shot lead over amateur Eric Wishart. However, he did not open well during the second round. He shot a 39 during the second round's front nine and ended up "fading" to a 75 (+2). He fell into a tie for the lead with Alan Murray. He shot even-par for the remainder of the tournament to finish solo second, four behind champion Frank Phillips. The following month, in October, he played the Adelaide Advertiser Tournament. Coxon took the first round lead with Brian Crafter after a 69. He eventually finished in a tie for ninth. A few days later he played the Rosenthal Riverland $1500 tournament, again in Adelaide. He opened with a 67 to tie a number of players for the lead. He then shot a 69 in the second round, including a birdie on the last hole, to tie Ted Ball for the win. In November he opened well at the Australian PGA Championship. In the first round he shot a 71 (−1) to position himself in a tie for third. However, he shot over-par in each round for the remainder of the tournament and finished in a tie for 13th. In late November he played the New Zealand Wills Masters at Russley Golf Course. After two rounds he was at 139 (−7) to put him in a tie for fourth place, six back of leader Tim Woolbank. In rounds three and four he again shot consecutive rounds of 69 and 70. He finished in solo third place at 278 (−14), three back of co-champions Woolbank and Peter Thomson. A few weeks later he recorded a tie for fifth at the Metalcraft Tournament in New Zealand. Encouraged by his recent good play, Coxon stated that he might try out for the PGA Tour the following year at 1967 PGA Tour Qualifying School.

In January it was announced that Coxon would tour the Far East Circuit. He did not record many high finishes, however. As of April, he started playing events in Europe. His poor play continued during the beginning of the season. In the middle of the season he began to play better however. At the Martini International in the middle of June he finished in fourth place, two back of the champion. In mid-July, he qualified for the 1967 Open Championship. He shot an opening round 73 to put him five back of the lead. He played poorly in the second round, however. He missed putts within four putts at the 2nd and 3rd holes. On the par-4 6th hole he hit a shot out of bounds leading a triple bogey. He would go on to miss short putts on the 8th hole, 13th hole, and 18th hole. "You wouldn't believe how badly I putted," he said after the round. "You can't afford to do that and still hope to do well." He shot a 76 (+4). He made the cut on the number, however. In the third round Coxon improved to 71 (−1), his best round so far. He then closed with a 70 (−2). He finished in a tie for 18th place. Because he finished in the top 20 and was exempt for the following year's British Open. Roughly a week later he started play at the Dutch Open. In the second round he shot a 68, the lowest of the tournament so far, to move into a tie for second place, one behind leader Guy Wolstenholme. He finished in a tie for 8th place with Brian Boys of New Zealand, seven back of champion Peter Townsend. Late in the year he played in the Alcan International at St. Andrews Golf Club. During the third round, playing against a "near gale," he fired a 69, a "major achievement" given the weather. It advanced him into a tie for sixth. He finished in a tie for eighth. Overall, according to The Age, the general assessment was that Coxon "did well in Britain" for the season.

Shortly thereafter Coxon returned to Australia. In late October he played the Australian Open at Commonwealth Golf Course in Melbourne. He opened with a 72 (−1) to put him in a tie for third, three back of Peter Thomson's lead. In the second round Coxon shot an even-par round to remain in contention, now in a tie for fourth. However, he played poorly in the third and fourth rounds, shooting 77 and 79 respectively, to finish in a tie for 15th. The following month he opened well at the New Zealand Open. He shot a 70 (−1) that, like his Australian Open first round performance, put him in a tie for third place, again three back of Thomson. In the second round he shot a 73 (+2) to fall into a tie for sixth. In the final two rounds he again shot slightly over par to finish in a tie for eighth place. The following week, on Monday November 27, he played the one-day, two-round Land Rover Tournament in Wanganui, New Zealand. In the morning round he shot a 69 (−1) followed by a 65 (−5) for an "easy victory" over runner-ups Bob Charles and Frank Phillips. A few days later he began play at the New Zealand Wills Masters at Russley Golf Course in Christchurch, New Zealand. He opened in the top ten with a 72 (−1). After the second round he moved into a tie for sixth with a 70 (−3). He slipped back a little with a third round 74 (+1) but a final round 69 (−4) gave him a tie for eighth place. Late in the season, in February 1968, he had an erratic though notable performance at the Victorian Open. He had "a mixture of good and bad holes" in the first round. At the par-5 561-yard 6th hole he hit his two-iron approach to 2 1/2 feet to assure eagle. However, on the next hole, the par-5 7th hole, he hit his first two shots into the woods and made double-bogey. Other than these two holes, however, he generally had success, making six birdies and one bogey. His 70 (-5) put him one behind amateur Bill Simpson. His performance in the second round was again erratic. Coxon "didn't look likely to be one of the joint leaders" at the beginning of the second round as he shot two-over-par for the first four holes. However, he birdied the 5th and 6th holes to get back to level par. On the back nine Coxon continued to play erratically. He recorded five birdies, two pars, one bogey, and one double-bogey on the final nine. However, his 73 (−2) was good enough to tie Stan Peach for the lead. In the third round he played slightly worse, shooting a one-under-par 74, and fell a stroke behind leader Peter Thomson. However, Coxon failed to contend seriously during the fourth round, falling four strokes behind Thomson by Sunday's front nine. He finished in solo fourth place at 291 (−4), three back of champion Thomson.

Like the previous years, he again turned to Asia once the Australian season concluded. He did not have much success on the Far East Circuit, however. Coxon finished well behind at the Malaysian Open and Taiwan Open. Shortly thereafter he had some success early in tournaments but failed to follow through. The week after Taiwan Open he played the Yomiuri International. Over the course of two-rounds he was at three-under-par, at 141, tied with Randall Vines. However, he "had trouble with his tee shots" in the third round and "slumped" to a 74 (+2). In the final round he again shot over-par "and finished well down." The following week he played the Indian Open. He was briefly in contention, holding second place after the first round. However, he shot a second round 80 (+7) to fall out of contention.

By May, Coxon was back in Europe. He played in a number of tournaments, including the Sumrie Tournament and Daks Tournament, but did not record many highlights. However, he did receive some media attention for his play at the 1968 Open Championship in July. Coxon opened the tournament well. However, he "blew up" during the second round's front nine with a 42 (+6). He was at 149 (+5) after two rounds. He still made the cut, however. He ultimately finished at 311 (+23), dozens of strokes behind the leaders.

As of September he had returned to Australia. The poorly play continued. Though he could perform well at some isolated rounds, according to The Age, "Coxon has not been able to string together four low rounds." His greatest success during the 1968–69 season was at the New South Wales Open. He opened with consecutive rounds of 71 (−1) to put him in solo second place, three back of leader Frank Phillips. Despite a third round 74 (+2) he was now only one behind leaders Phillips and Bill Dunk. After the final round's front nine he was now two back of leader Dunk and one back of Tim Woolbank. Coxon continued to play with "consistency" on the back nine and by the 15th hole remained one back, now one behind leader Kel Nagle. At the 18th hole Coxon had a 16-foot putt to potentially tie Nagle for the lead. He made the birdie putt drawing "roars from the crowd." Dunk had "a long-range putt" on the last to win but it lipped out. Nagle, Coxon, and Dunk would play in an 18-hole playoff the next day. The playoff "was something of an anti-climax," however. Coxon started the day shooting three-over-par during the first four holes and "never seriously challenged" for the championship. He ultimately recorded an 80 (+8) to finish seven behind champion Nagle and four behind Dunk. In the following month, in November, Coxon had success at the Sax Altman Tournament in New Zealand. In the opening round he shot a 75 to put him eight shots behind leader Guy Wolstenholme. In the second round, however, he played much better. Despite the "40 mile-an-hour wind" he birdied the 3rd and 5th holes. In the words of Peter Thomson, "he continued to the end without mistake," with three more birdies. His 67 (−5) tied the course record and put him only two behind Wolstenholme. He struggled during the final two rounds, however, and ended up in a tie for eighth, six back of co-champions Wolstenholme and Thomson. Coxon also had some success at the Victorian Open purse, late in the season. The event was held a day before the tournament proper on 5 February 1969. Coxon putted well, making four putts 10 feet or longer, and shot a 68 (−6). He won the $A500 purse. The Australian golf season soon ended. Usually Coxon returned to Asia and then Europe at this time. However, his wife was expecting their first child so he decided to stay in Australia.

Coxon returned to work as a touring professional by June. That month he played the two-round Yarrawonga Open. Coxon opened with a 69 (−2) to put him one back of the lead held by Peter Mills and Jerry Stolhand. Coxon began the final round "brilliantly" with birdies on the first and third holes. It was a back and forth battle between Mills and Coxon for the remainder of the round. On the par-5 18th hole, Coxon was tied with Mills. However, he surprisingly bogeyed the "birdie hole" giving Mills the tournament. Coxon finished at 140 (−2), one back of Mills for solo second. In August, Coxon played the two-round Bankstown purse. Coxon caught fire in the middle of the back nine, eagling the 12th hole and then birdieing the 14th and 15th. He ultimately shot a 67 (−4) to take a two-stroke lead over Vic Bennetts and Bob Swinbourne. However, Bennetts would defeat him the next day. The following month, in September, he played the New South Wales PGA Championship at Castle Hill Country Club in Sydney. He shot 146 (+2) over the first two rounds to put himself in the top ten, five back. In the third round he shot a 73 (+1) to stay five back. In the fourth round Coxon shot a 68 (−4), the round of the day, to move into solo third, three back of champion Bill Dunk. In October he had some success at the Wills Masters at Victoria Golf Club in Melbourne. He opened with a 70 (−3) to put him two back of the lead, in a tie for third. He ultimately tied for sixth place at 286 (−6). He defeated a number of notable golfers by several shots including Billy Casper, Peter Oosterhuis, and David Graham. In November he played a pro-am event at Royal Canberra Golf Club. He teamed up with the club's former treasurer, Tom Johnson, for a fourball handicap event played under the Stableford scoring system. The duo won the event with 44 points. Late in the month he played the North Coast Open at Coffs Harbour Golf Club. He opened with a 71 (−1) to put him one back of the lead held by Englishman Clive Clark and Australian Alan Murray. In the second round he scored higher, a 74 (+2), but "most of the leading professionals crashed" so he moved into the top spot, tied with two others. However, he continued to play poorly, with subsequent rounds in the mid-70s, and finished significantly behind champion Tony Mangan. The following week he played the New Zealand Open. In the first two rounds he shot an aggregate of 139 (−1) to put himself in the top ten, three back of Kel Nagle's lead. However, he closed again closed badly with rounds over-par to finish well back. A few weeks later he played the Spalding Masters, again in New Zealand. He finished solo second, one behind New Zealand amateur Stuart Jones.

In the early 1970s Coxon had much success in pro-ams and smaller tournaments. In mid-May he played the Southwark $1,000 tournament at Mount Gambier Golf Course. He shot a 66, tying the course record, to defeat Bill Dunk by a shot. The following day, on May 20, he played the South Australian Open's pro-am at Glenelg Golf Club. He shot a 67, another course record, to again defeat Dunk by one. In addition, he won the pro-am's fourball tournament shooting a 63 (−9) with teammate Doug Omond. In September he again played excellently at another pro-am. At Penrith Golf Club's pro-am he shot a 68 (−4) to finish in joint second, three behind champion Bill Dunk. Later in the month he played the Rothman's $2,000 Pro-Am at Oatlands Golf Course in Sydney. Coxon finished with "a string of birdies" at the last three holes to record a 67 and tie the course record. Coxon "looked set to win" until Colin Porter "stormed home" on the back nine. Porter ultimately finished with a 66 to defeat Coxon by one. A few days later he began play at the New South Wales PGA Championship. He recorded a tie for fifth place. A few weeks later, in late October, he played the Australian Open. He opened with a 71 (−1) to put him in joint second, one behind leader Frank Phillips, tied with, among others, Gary Player and Peter Thomson for second place. The following week he played the Rothman's $2,000 pro-am at Federal Golf Club. He shot a 71 (−2) to finish joint second, three behind champion Vic Bennetts. In November he again played well at a pro-am. At the Wills pro-am golf tournament he shot a bogey-free 64 (−6) to tie Alan Murray for the win. In the middle of 1971 he would continue with success. In May he played the South Australian PGA Championship. He finished joint second at the event, tied with Dunk and American Jerry Stolhand, nine shots behind champion Bennetts. In June he played the Blue Lake Classic at Mount Gambier Golf Club, also in South Australia. He shared the championship with Bennetts.

As of July 1971, Coxon was the head club professional at Fox Hills Golf Club in Prospect, New South Wales. He replaced Bill Dunk at the job. He did not play much as a touring professional for the remainder of his career. However, he still recorded a few highlights. In October 1971 he opened well at the Australian Open held at Royal Hobart Golf Club in Tasmania. His 69 (−3) to put him in a tie for second place with Dave Hill, one behind leaders Graham Johnson and Jack Nicklaus. He shot one-under-par for the remainder of the tournament to finish in a tie for eighth. In March 1973 he had success at the Ampol Liverpool $5,100 National Pro-Am. His fourball team of Colin McGregor, Kel Nagle, and Ian Alexander shot a 60 (−12) at the Liverpool Golf Course. They finished in second place, one behind a team led by Ron Braitwaite. Coxon continued to play in some events on the PGA Tour of Australia through the decade but did not record many notable results. One of his few highlights during this era was tying the course record at The Grange Golf Club's West Course in 1976.

As a senior, Coxon played in some events, including the Australian PGA Seniors Championship, but did not record many high finishes.

== Personal life ==
As of the late 1960s, Coxon was married to Judy. She was expecting their first child in March 1969.

== Professional wins (8) ==
=== New Zealand Golf Circuit wins (2) ===
No.	Date	Tournament	Winning score	Margin of victory	Runner(s)-up
1	14 Sep 1963	Roslyn Tournament	−8 (69-68-71=208) (Note: Shortened to 54 holes due to weather.)	1 stroke	(Australia) Bob Tuohy
2	27 Nov 1967	Land Rover Tournament	−6 (69-65=134)	6 strokes	(New Zealand) Bob Charles, (Australia) Frank Phillips

=== Other wins (6) ===
- 1965 New Zealand PGA Championship, Rosenthal Riverland tournament
- 1966 Rosenthal Riverland tournament (tie with Ted Ball)
- 1970 Amoco Forbes Open, Southwark $1,000 tournament
- 1971 Blue Lake Classic (tie with Vic Bennetts)

== Results in major championships ==
Tournament	1967	1968
The Open Championship	T18	T42

Note: The Open Championship was the only major Coxon played.
"T" indicates a tie for a place
