= Metalcraft Tournament =

New Zealand golf tournament

Tournament information
- Location: Wellington, New Zealand
- Established: 1963
- Course: Miramir Links
- Par: 71
- Tour: New Zealand Golf Circuit
- Format: Stroke play
- Prize fund: NZ$4,000
- Month played: December
- Final year: 1967

Tournament record score
- Aggregate: 273 Bob Charles (1966)
- To par: −15 as above

Final champion
- (New Zealand) Walter Godfrey

Location map
- Location in New Zealand

The Metalcraft Tournament was a golf tournament held in New Zealand from 1963 to 1967. Peter Thomson won the event twice, tying in 1963 and winning outright in 1965. The event was part of the New Zealand Golf Circuit.

== Winners ==
Year	Winner	Score	To par	Margin of victory	Runner(s)-up	Venue	Ref.
1967	(New Zealand) Walter Godfrey	282	−2	1 stroke	(Australia) Frank Phillips	Miramar Links	
1966	(New Zealand) Bob Charles	273	−15	3 strokes	(England) Clive Clark	Hamilton	
1965	(Australia) Peter Thomson (2)	208	−8	3 strokes	(Australia) Barry Coxon (New Zealand) Walter Godfrey (Australia) Alan Murray (New Zealand) Ross Newdick	Hamilton	
1964	(Australia) Bill Dunk	274	−14	5 strokes	(Australia) Kel Nagle	Manawatu	
1963	(Australia) Ted Ball (Australia) Peter Thomson	287	−5	Title shared		Palmerston North	
