= Wattie's Tournament =

Tournament information
- Location: Bridge Pa, New Zealand
- Established: 1963
- Course: Hastings Golf Club
- Par: 70
- Tour: New Zealand Golf Circuit
- Format: Stroke play
- Prize fund: NZ$7,000
- Month played: December
- Final year: 1970

Tournament record score
- Aggregate: 262 Graham Marsh (1970)
- To par: −18 as above

Final champion
- (Australia) Graham Marsh

Location map
- Location in New Zealand

The Wattie's Tournament was a golf tournament held in New Zealand from 1963 to 1970.

== History ==
The event was generally hosted by Hastings Golf Club in Bridge Pa, except the 1969 event which was held at Gisborne. The 1963 tournament was held in September but later it was played in late November or in December. Bob Charles won the event four times. The event was sponsored by Wattie's. The event was part of the New Zealand Golf Circuit.

== Winners ==
Year	Winner	Score	To par	Margin of victory	Runner(s)-up	Ref.
1970	(Australia) Graham Marsh	262	−18	3 strokes	(Australia) Kel Nagle	
1969	(Australia) Glenn McCully	274	−14	3 strokes	(New Zealand) Bob Charles (Australia) Bill Dunk	
1968	(New Zealand) Bob Charles (4)	274	−6	2 strokes	(New Zealand) Walter Godfrey	
1967	(New Zealand) Bob Charles (3)	272	−8	2 strokes	(New Zealand) Stuart Jones (a)	
1966	(New Zealand) Bob Charles (2)	265	−15	6 strokes	(England) Tony Jacklin	
1965	(New Zealand) Stuart Jones (a)	270	−10	2 strokes	(Australia) John Sullivan	
1964	(Australia) Bill Dunk (South Africa) Cobie Legrange	274	−6	Title shared		
1963	(New Zealand) Bob Charles	271	−9	3 strokes	(Australia) Bill Dunk	
