= Wills Classic =

Tournament information
- Location: Wellington, New Zealand
- Established: 1960
- Course: Royal Wellington Golf Club
- Par: 70
- Tour: New Zealand Golf Circuit
- Format: Stroke play
- Prize fund: £NZ2,000
- Month played: September
- Final year: 1964

Tournament record score
- Aggregate: 266 Ted Ball (1964)
- To par: −14 as above

Final champion
- (Australia) Ted Ball
- Location in New Zealand

The Wills Classic was a series of golf tournaments held in Australia and New Zealand from 1960 to 1964. The first event in 1960 was contested by four players over nine different courses between 17 September and 2 October; the winner was determined by the aggregate score. Total prize money was A£5,100. The players were Stan Leonard, Gary Player, Mike Souchak and Peter Thomson. In 1961, the event became a 72-hole tournament with prize money of A£3,000. From 1963, the Australian tournament was replaced by the Wills Masters and the Classic event was moved to New Zealand. The New Zealand tournaments were part of the New Zealand Golf Circuit and had prize money of NZ£2,000. The sponsor was W.D. & H.O. Wills, a cigarette manufacturer.

== Winners ==
Year	Winner	Score	To par	Margin of victory	Runner(s)-up	Venue	Ref.
1964	(Australia) Ted Ball	266	−14	5 strokes	(Australia) Barry Coxon (Australia) Bob Tuohy	Wellington	
1963	(Australia) Bruce Devlin (2)	287	−5	4 strokes	(Australia) Ted Ball (Australia) Kel Nagle	Russley	
1962	(Australia) Bruce Devlin	281	−7	6 strokes	(Australia) Ted Ball	The Australian	
1961	(South Africa) Gary Player	286	−2	3 strokes	(Australia) Eric Cremin	The Lakes	
1960	(Australia) Peter Thomson	633	−15	3 strokes	(South Africa) Gary Player	Various	
