= Roslyn Tournament =

Tournament information
- Location: Dunedin, New Zealand
- Established: 1963
- Courses: Balmacewen Course; Otago Golf Club
- Par: 72
- Tour: New Zealand Golf Circuit
- Format: Stroke play
- Prize fund: £NZ1,500
- Month played: September
- Final year: 1963

Tournament record score
- Aggregate: 208 Barry Coxon (1963)
- To par: −8 as above

Final champion
- (Australia) Barry Coxon

Location map
- Location in New Zealand

The Roslyn Tournament was a golf tournament held in New Zealand in 1963. The event was played on the Balmacewen course at Otago Golf Club in Dunedin, New Zealand. The tournament was reduced to 54 holes by heavy rain on the final day. Barry Coxon won the event by 1 stroke from Bob Tuohy. The event was part of the New Zealand Golf Circuit.

== Winners ==
Year	Winner	Score	To par	Margin of victory	Runner-up	Ref.
1963	(Australia) Barry Coxon	208 (Note: Shortened to 54 holes due to rain.)	−8	1 stroke	(Australia) Bob Tuohy	
