= NBN-3 Tournament =

Golf tournament

The NBN-3 Tournament was a professional golf tournament held in 1970 at the Merewether Golf Club in Newcastle, New South Wales, Australia. Total prize money was A$10,000. The event was sponsored by NBN-3, a television station based in Newcastle.

Kel Nagle won by a stroke from Walter Godfrey and Peter Thomson. Bill Dunk had a final round of 60, making birdies at the last 7 holes.

== Winners ==
| Year | Winner | Country | Score | To par | Margin of victory | Runners-up | Ref |
|---|---|---|---|---|---|---|---|
| 1970 | Kel Nagle | Australia | 269 | −11 | 1 stroke | (New Zealand) Walter Godfrey (Australia) Peter Thomson | |
