= BP Tournament =

Tournament information
- Location: Auckland, New Zealand
- Established: 1964
- Course: Grange Golf Club
- Par: 70
- Tour: New Zealand Golf Circuit
- Format: Stroke play
- Prize fund: NZ$5,000
- Month played: December
- Final year: 1968

Tournament record score
- Aggregate: 272 Bill Dunk (1964); 272 Kel Nagle (1968)
- To par: −16 Bill Dunk (1964)

Final champion
- (Australia) Kel Nagle

Location map
- Location in New Zealand

The BP Tournament was a golf tournament held in New Zealand from 1964 to 1968. Four of the five events were held at Titirangi Golf Club, Auckland. Kel Nagle won the event three times, including a tie. In the other two events he was runner-up and third. The event was part of the New Zealand Golf Circuit.

== Winners ==
Year	Winner	Score	To par	Margin of victory	Runner(s)-up	Venue	Ref.
1968	(Australia) Kel Nagle (3)	272	−8	1 stroke	(New Zealand) Bob Charles (England) Guy Wolstenholme	Grange	
1967	(New Zealand) Walter Godfrey	273	−15	1 stroke	(Australia) Peter Thomson	Titirangi	
1966	(Australia) Kel Nagle (2)	276	−12	3 strokes	(England) Clive Clark (Netherlands) Martin Roesink	Titirangi	
1965	(Australia) Kel Nagle (Australia) Peter Thomson	278	−10	Title shared		Titirangi	
1964	(Australia) Bill Dunk	272	−16	4 strokes	(Australia) Ted Ball (Australia) Kel Nagle	Titirangi	
