= Sax Altman Tournament =

Golf tournament

Tournament information
- Location: Hamilton, New Zealand
- Established: 1968
- Course: Lochiel Course
- Par: 72
- Tour: New Zealand Golf Circuit
- Format: Stroke play
- Prize fund: NZ$5,000
- Month played: November
- Final year: 1968

Tournament record score
- Aggregate: 285 Peter Thomson (1968); 285 Guy Wolstenholme (1968)
- To par: −3 as above

Final champion
- (Australia) Peter Thomson and (England) Guy Wolstenholme

Location map
- Location in New Zealand

The Sax Altman Tournament was a golf tournament held in New Zealand in late November 1968.

== History ==
The event was played on the Lochiel course near Hamilton, New Zealand. It was the first event of the New Zealand's summer golf circuit. The event resulted in a tie between Peter Thomson and Guy Wolstenholme. Kel Nagle finished a stroke behind. Wolstenholme missed a 14-foot putt on the final green that would have given him an outright victory. The event was part of the New Zealand Golf Circuit.

== Winners ==
Year	Winners	Score	To par	Margin of victory	Runner-up	Ref.
1968	(Australia) Peter Thomson (England) Guy Wolstenholme	285	−3	Title shared		
