= Wiseman's Tournament =

Tournament information
- Location: Auckland, New Zealand
- Established: 1952
- Course: Chamberlain Park Golf Club
- Par: 72
- Tour: New Zealand Golf Circuit
- Format: Stroke play
- Prize fund: £NZ2,000
- Month played: August
- Final year: 1964

Tournament record score
- Aggregate: 275 Bill Dunk (1964)
- To par: −13 as above

Final champion
- (Australia) Bill Dunk

Location map
- Location in New Zealand

The Wiseman's Tournament was a golf tournament held irregularly in Auckland, New Zealand from 1952 to 1964. From 1963 the event was part of the New Zealand Golf Circuit.

== Winners ==
Year	Winner	Score	To par	Margin of victory	Runner(s)-up	Venue	Ref.
1964	(Australia) Bill Dunk	275	−13	3 strokes	(Australia) Len Thomas	Chamberlain Park	
1963	(Australia) Kel Nagle	281	−7	2 strokes	(Australia) Ted Ball	Chamberlain Park	
1959–1962: No tournament
1958	(South Africa) Harold Henning	278	−10	5 strokes	(South Africa) Gary Player (Australia) Peter Thomson	Chamberlain Park	
1956–57: No tournament
1955	(Australia) Peter Thomson	281		7 strokes	(New Zealand) Stuart Jones (a)		
1953–54: No tournament
1952	(Wales) Dai Rees	281		4 strokes	(England) Harry Weetman	Titirangi	
