= Spalding Masters =

Tournament information
- Location: Tauranga, New Zealand
- Established: 1967
- Course: Tauranga Golf Club
- Par: 70
- Tour: New Zealand Golf Circuit
- Format: Stroke play
- Prize fund: NZ$5,000
- Month played: January
- Final year: 1972

Tournament record score
- Aggregate: 260 Bob Charles (1969)
- To par: −20 as above

Final champion
- (New Zealand) Bob Charles

Location map
- Location in New Zealand

The Spalding Masters was a golf tournament held in New Zealand from 1967 to 1972. The event was generally hosted by Tauranga Golf Club in Tauranga, although the 1968 event was held at Mount Manganui, and the 1967 event at Rotarua. The tournament was held in early January, although the 1972 event started on 30 December 1971.

== History ==
From 1969 the tournament was part of the New Zealand golf circuit. Bob Charles won the event twice. His 1969 total of 260 tied Kel Nagle for the lowest 72-hole score ever in a tournament played outside of the United States.

== Winners ==
Year	Winner	Score	To par	Margin of victory	Runner(s)-up	Ref.
1972	(New Zealand) Bob Charles (2)	200 (Note: Shortened to 54 holes due to weather.)	−10	2 strokes	(England) Guy Wolstenholme	
1971	(Australia) Graham Marsh	266	−14	2 strokes	(England) Guy Wolstenholme	
1970	(New Zealand) Stuart Jones (a)	274	−6	1 stroke	(Australia) Barry Coxon	
1969	(New Zealand) Bob Charles	260	−20	10 strokes	(New Zealand) John Lister	
1968	(Australia) Bill Dunk	198	−15	2 strokes	(New Zealand) Ted McDougall (a) (Australia) Bob Shaw	
1967	(New Zealand) Walter Godfrey	266		10 strokes	(New Zealand) Don Boone (a)	
