= Victorian Open =

Golf tournament

Coordinates: 38.2779°S 144.4577°E

Vic Open
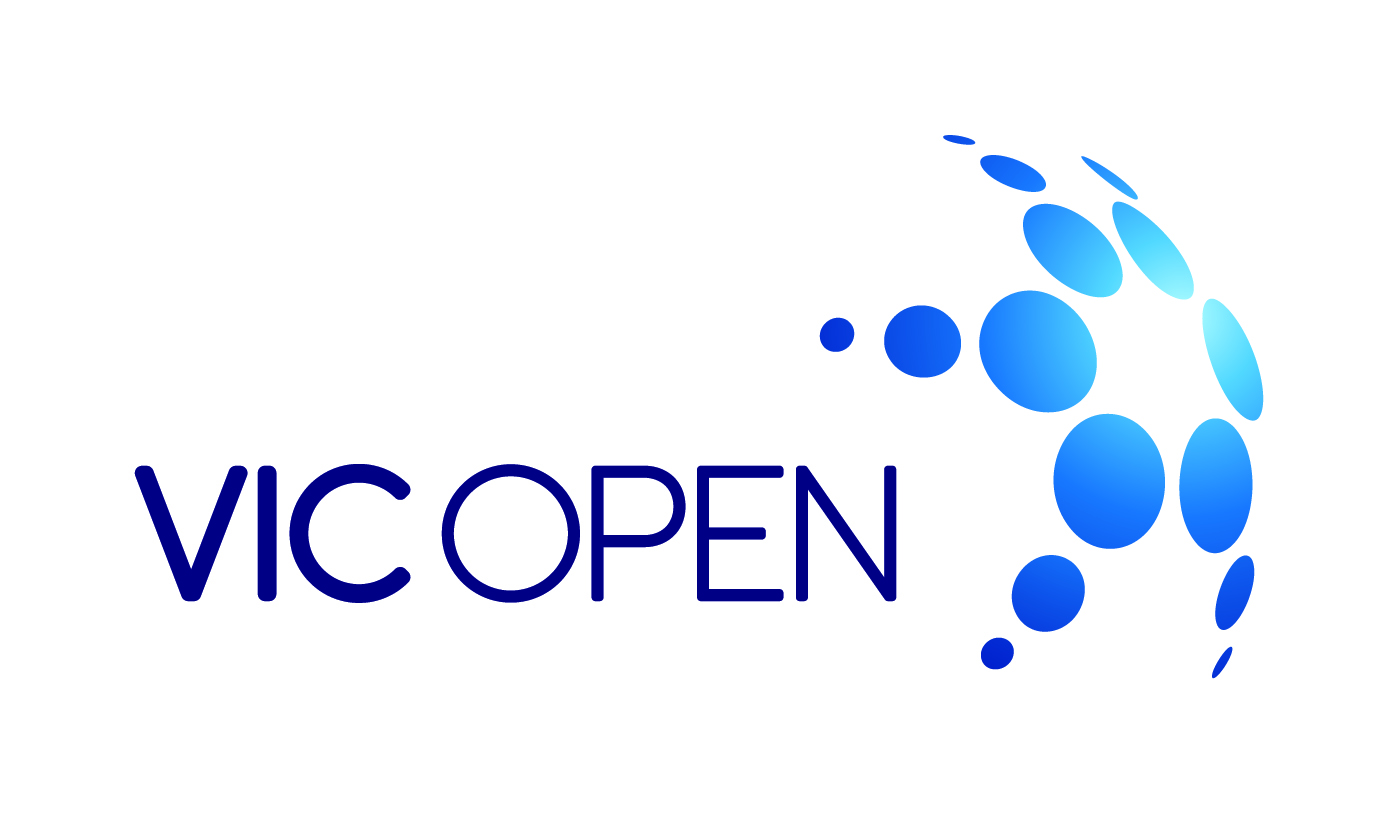

Tournament information
- Location: Barwon Heads, Australia
- Established: 1957
- Courses: 13th Beach Golf Links (Beach and Creek Courses)
- Par: 72 (B); 72 (C)
- Length: 6,838 yards (6,253 m) (B); 6,940 yards (6,350 m) (C)
- Tours: European Tour; PGA Tour of Australasia; Von Nida Tour
- Format: Stroke play
- Prize fund: A$200,000
- Month played: February

Tournament record score
- Aggregate: 267 Dimitrios Papadatos (2022); 267 Michael Hendry (2023)
- To par: −21 as above

Current champion
- (Australia) Cameron John

Location map
- Location in Australia Location in Victoria

The Victorian Open is an annual golf tournament held in Australia. It was founded in 1957 and is the Victoria state open championship for men. It is run by Golf Victoria and is a Golf Australia national ranking event.

The event is held concurrently with the Women's Victorian Open and offers equal prize pool for the two events. The tournament's tag line is: "Men and women. On the same course. At the same time. For equal prize money." The men and women play on the same course at the same time in alternating groups.

== History ==
The first Victorian Open was played at Riversdale in 1957, replacing the Victorian Close Championship which had been first held in 1948. It was won by Ossie Pickworth who finished 10 strokes ahead of the field. Prize money was £250 but only one competitor, amateur Harry Hattersley, was from outside the state.

Three of the first four editions were won by Victorians with Gary Player winning 1959. However professionals from New South Wales won 9 of the 10 events from 1961 to 1970 with only Peter Thomson from Victoria breaking their run of success in 1968.

From 2004 to 2007 the tournament was part of the second-tier Von Nida Tour. It was not played in 2008 but from 2009 to 2016 it was a Tier 2 event on the PGA Tour of Australasia schedule. In 2017 it became a Tier 1 event.

Since 2012, it has been held concurrently with the Women's Victorian Open, being held at 13th Beach Golf Links in Barwon Heads, Victoria since 2013. When the tournament moved to 13th Beach Golf Links in 2013 the combined prize pool was $300,000, with $150,000 on offer for each of the men's and women's fields. In six years, the total prize pool has increased ten-fold. In 2019, the men's and women's Victorian Open fields played for a total purse of $3 million, $1.5 million for each event.

In 2019 and 2020, the event was co-sanctioned by the European Tour. The event continues to be played alongside the Women's Victorian Open, now co-sanctioned by the LPGA Tour. The event features a double cut, 65 players will remain after the first cut, then 35 players after the Saturday cut. In February 2019, James Nitties matched the world record of nine consecutive birdies in the Victorian Open. His birdie run from the 15th to the fifth in the first round set a European Tour record and matched Mark Calcavecchia's feat in the 2009 Canadian Open. David Law won the first co-sanctioned European Tour edition of the event. He won by a one stroke margin after entering the final three holes three strokes behind. Law birdied the 16th and eagled the final hole, this coupled with Wade Ormsby double bogeying his penultimate hole, led to Law claiming victory.

No event was played in 2021 due to the COVID-19 pandemic. The event returned in 2022 as a sole-sanctioned PGA Tour of Australasia event and had a reduced prize fund.

== Winners ==
Year	Tour(s) (Note: ANZ − PGA Tour of Australasia; EUR − European Tour; VNT − Von Nida Tour.)	Winner	Score	To par	Margin of victory	Runner(s)-up	Venue	Ref.
Vic Open
2026	ANZ	(Australia) Cameron John	280	−8	Playoff	(Australia) Nathan Barbieri	13th Beach	
2025	ANZ	(New Zealand) Josh Geary	275	−13	4 strokes	(Australia) Connor McKinney	13th Beach	
2024	ANZ	(Australia) Brett Coletta	270	−18	2 strokes	(Australia) Andrew Martin (Australia) Jordan Zunic	13th Beach	
2023	ANZ	(New Zealand) Michael Hendry	267	−21	4 strokes	(Australia) David Micheluzzi	13th Beach	
2022	ANZ	(Australia) Dimitrios Papadatos (2)	267	−21	1 stroke	(New Zealand) Ben Campbell	13th Beach	
2021: No tournament due to the COVID-19 pandemic								
ISPS Handa Vic Open
2020	ANZ, EUR	(Australia) Min Woo Lee	269	−19	2 strokes	(New Zealand) Ryan Fox	13th Beach	
2019	ANZ, EUR	(Scotland) David Law	270	−18	1 stroke	(Australia) Brad Kennedy (Australia) Wade Ormsby	13th Beach	
Oates Vic Open
2018	ANZ	(Australia) Simon Hawkes	274	−14	Playoff (Note: Hawkes won with birdie on first extra hole)	(Australia) Harrison Endycott	13th Beach	
2017	ANZ	(Australia) Dimitrios Papadatos	272	−16	2 strokes	(Australia) Adam Bland (Australia) Jake McLeod	13th Beach	
2016	ANZ	(New Zealand) Michael Long	275	−13	Playoff (Note: Long won with birdie on first extra hole)	(Australia) Matthew Millar	13th Beach	
2015	ANZ	(Australia) Richard Green	272	−16	Playoff (Note: Green won with birdie on second extra hole)	(Australia) Nick Cullen	13th Beach	
Oates Victorian Open Championship
2014	ANZ	(Australia) Matthew Griffin	281	−7	Playoff (Note: Griffin won with birdie on third extra hole)	(Australia) Matt Stieger	13th Beach	
Victorian Open
2013	ANZ	(Australia) Matthew Giles	275	−13	1 stroke	(Australia) Nathan Holman (a) (Australia) Ryan Lynch	13th Beach	
2012	ANZ	(Australia) Scott Arnold	272	−12	1 stroke	(Australia) Kurt Barnes	Spring Valley	
2011	ANZ	(Australia) Paul Sheehan	276	−8	2 strokes	(Australia) Matthew Griffin	Spring Valley	
Subaru Victorian Open
2010	ANZ	(Australia) Jason Norris	274	−10	2 strokes	(Australia) Chris Campbell	Spring Valley	
2009	ANZ	(Australia) Ashley Hall	278	−10	2 strokes	(Australia) Scott Laycock (Australia) Craig Scott	Spring Valley	
Victorian Open
2008: No tournament
2007	VNT	(Australia) Kim Felton	280	−8	1 stroke	(Australia) Steve Collins (Australia) Marc Leishman (Australia) Aron Price	Woodlands	
2006	VNT	(Australia) David Diaz	202	−14	2 strokes	(Australia) Marcus Cain (Australia) Aron Price	Woodlands	
Mitsubishi Motors Victorian Open
2005	VNT	(Australia) Kurt Barnes	204	−12	Playoff	(Australia) Nathan Green	Woodlands	
2004	VNT	(New Zealand) Gareth Paddison	204	−12	5 strokes	(Australia) Richard Green (Australia) Paul Sheehan	Woodlands	
Victorian Open
2003	VNT	Cancelled						
ANZ Victorian Open Championship
2002	ANZ	(Australia) Andre Stolz	274	−8	Playoff (Note: Stolz won with par on second extra hole)	(Australia) David Bransdon	Sorrento/Portsea	
2001	ANZ	(Australia) Scott Laycock	270	−18	3 strokes	(Australia) Richard Green	Cranbourne	
Victorian Open
2000		(Australia) Brad Lamb (a)	278	−14	Playoff (Note: Lamb won with par on first extra hole)	(Sweden) Jens Nilsson	Cranbourne	
1999	ANZ	(Australia) Kenny Druce	275	−13	3 strokes	(Australia) Lucas Parsons	Victoria	
1998	ANZ	(Australia) Brad King	272	−16	5 strokes	(Australia) Greg Chalmers (Sweden) Daniel Chopra (Australia) Terry Price	Victoria	
1997	ANZ	(Australia) Stephen Leaney (2)	280	−8	1 stroke	(Australia) Darren Cole (Australia) Euan Walters	Victoria	
1996: No tournament
1995	ANZ	(Australia) Stephen Leaney	283	−5	1 stroke	(Australia) Robert Allenby (Australia) Mike Clayton	Victoria	
1994	ANZ	(United States) Patrick Burke	278	−10	2 strokes	(Australia) Tim Elliott (Australia) Robert Willis	Victoria	
1993	ANZ	(Australia) Lucas Parsons	276	−12	3 strokes	(Australia) Bradley Hughes	Woodlands	
1992		(Australia) Ian Stanley	284	−4	1 stroke	(Australia) Jeff Senior	Woodlands	
1991		(Australia) Robert Allenby (a)	287	−1	6 strokes	(Australia) David Armstrong (Australia) Paul Moloney	Woodlands	
1990	ANZ	Cancelled						
1989	ANZ	(Australia) Mike Clayton (2)	285	−3	2 strokes	(Australia) Ossie Moore	Kingston Heath	
1988	ANZ	(United States) Jim Benepe	282	−6	3 strokes	(Australia) Ian Baker-Finch (Australia) Peter McWhinney	Kingston Heath	
Robert Boyd Transport Victorian Open
1987	ANZ	(Australia) Roger Mackay	277	−11	1 stroke	(Australia) Greg Norman	Kingston Heath	
1986	ANZ	(Australia) Ossie Moore	280	−8	1 stroke	(Australia) Vaughan Somers (New Zealand) Greg Turner	Yarra Yarra	
Victorian Open
1985	ANZ	(Australia) Ian Baker-Finch	279	−9	2 strokes	(Australia) Rodger Davis	Yarra Yarra	
1984	ANZ	(Australia) Greg Norman	281	−7	2 strokes	(Australia) Bob Shearer	Metropolitan	
1983	ANZ	(Australia) Bob Shearer	282	−6	1 stroke	(Australia) Greg Norman	Metropolitan	
1982	ANZ	(Australia) Mike Clayton	281	−7	3 strokes	(Australia) Bob Shearer	Metropolitan	
1981	ANZ	(Australia) Bill Dunk	277	−11	5 strokes	(Australia) Wayne Grady	Metropolitan	
1980	ANZ	(England) Guy Wolstenholme (4)	282	−6	4 strokes	(Australia) Graham Marsh	Metropolitan	
1979	ANZ	(Australia) Rodger Davis	291	+3	Playoff (Note: Davis won with birdie on second extra hole)	(Australia) Geoff Parslow (South Africa) Gary Player	Kingston Heath	
1978	ANZ	(England) Guy Wolstenholme (3)	284	−4	Playoff (Note: Wolstenholme won with par on third extra hole)	(United States) Arnold Palmer	Metropolitan	
1977	ANZ	(Australia) Geoff Parslow	275	−13	4 strokes	(Australia) Greg Norman	Yarra Yarra	
1976	ANZ	(England) Guy Wolstenholme (2)	281	−7	Playoff (Note: Wolstenholme won with birdie on third extra hole)	(Australia) Graham Marsh	Kingston Heath	
1975	ANZ	(Australia) Stewart Ginn	283	−5	3 strokes	(Australia) Ian Stanley	Metropolitan	
1974	ANZ	(Australia) John Davis	287	−5	1 stroke	(Australia) Ted Ball (Australia) Bill Dunk (Australia) Ian Stanley (Australia) Randall Vines	Huntingdale	
1973	ANZ	(Australia) Peter Thomson (3)	284	−4	2 strokes	(Australia) Stewart Ginn (Australia) Bob Tuohy	Yarra Yarra	
1972		(New Zealand) Walter Godfrey	283	−9	7 strokes	(Japan) Isao Aoki (Australia) Peter Mills (Australia) Kel Nagle	Commonwealth	
1971		(England) Guy Wolstenholme	289	+1	2 strokes	(Australia) Peter Thomson	Woodlands	
1970		(Australia) David Graham	273	−19	4 strokes	(Australia) Kevin Hartley (a) (Australia) Kel Nagle (England) Guy Wolstenholme	Riversdale	
1969		(Australia) Kel Nagle (2)	279	−17	3 strokes	(Australia) Bill Dunk (Australia) Peter Thomson	Kingston Heath	
1968		(Australia) Peter Thomson (2)	288	−12	1 stroke	(Australia) Stan Peach	Huntingdale	
1967		(Australia) Kel Nagle	283	−9	1 stroke	(England) Guy Wolstenholme	Yarra Yarra	
1966		(Australia) Frank Phillips (2)	284	−8	4 strokes	(Australia) Barry Coxon	Riversdale	
1965		(Australia) Alan Murray (2)	291	−1	4 strokes	(Australia) Eric Cremin	Royal Melbourne	
1964		(Australia) Frank Phillips	278	−14	3 strokes	(Australia) Kel Nagle	Victoria	
1963		(Australia) Bruce Devlin (2)	286	−10	5 strokes	(Australia) Peter Mills	Kingswood	
1962		(Australia) Bruce Devlin	293	−7	2 strokes	(Australia) Bill Dunk	Huntingdale	
1961		(Australia) Alan Murray	290	−6	4 strokes	(Australia) Peter Thomson	Commonwealth	
1960		(Australia) Jack Harris	282	−6	4 strokes	(Australia) Bill Dunk	Metropolitan	
1959		(South Africa) Gary Player	275	−17	5 strokes	(South Africa) Harold Henning	Yarra Yarra	
1958		(Australia) Peter Thomson	289	−7	3 strokes	(Australia) Barry West	Kingston Heath	
1957		(Australia) Ossie Pickworth	282	−10	10 strokes	(Australia) Barry West (a)	Riversdale	
