= 1979–80 New Zealand Golf Circuit =

Golf tour season

1979–80 New Zealand Golf Circuit season
- Duration: 29 November 1979 – 2 January 1980
- Number of official events: 3
- Money list: (Australia) Rodger Davis

The 1979–80 New Zealand Golf Circuit was the 17th and final season of the New Zealand Golf Circuit, the main professional golf tour in New Zealand since it was established in 1963.

== Final season ==
The 1979–80 season proved to be the last season of the New Zealand Golf Circuit, as from 1980 the New Zealand events were incorporated into the PGA Tour of Australia schedule and a combined Order of Merit was produced.

== Schedule ==
The following table lists official events during the 1979–80 season.

Date	Tournament	Location	Purse (NZ$)	Winner (Note: The number in brackets after each winner's name is the number of New Zealand Golf Circuit events they had won up to and including that tournament. This information is only shown for New Zealand Golf Circuit members.)	Notes
2 Dec	Air New Zealand Shell Open	Wellington	75,000	(Australia) David Graham (1)	
9 Dec	New Zealand Open	Otago	50,000	(Australia) Stewart Ginn (1)	
2 Jan	New Zealand PGA Championship	Bay of Plenty	32,000	(New Zealand) Bob Charles (20)	

== Money list ==
The money list was based on tournament results during the season, calculated in New Zealand dollars.

Position	Player	Prize money (NZ$)
1	(Australia) Rodger Davis	15,932
2	(Australia) David Graham	12,500
3	(New Zealand) Simon Owen	10,215
4	(New Zealand) Bob Charles	9,858
5	(Australia) Stewart Ginn	8,270
