= City of Sydney Open =

Golf tournament

The City of Sydney Open was a golf tournament played at Moore Park Golf Course in Sydney, New South Wales, Australia between 1963 and 1970. The inaugural event was part of the celebrations of the 175th anniversary of the founding of Sydney. The 1969 event was played over 54 holes.

== Winners ==
Year	Winner	Country	Score	To par	Margin of victory	Runner(s)-up	Ref
1963	Peter Mills	Australia	288	+4	2 strokes	(Australia) Frank Phillips	
1964	Ted Ball	Australia	276	−8	4 strokes	(Australia) Col Johnston	
1965	Bob Stanton	Australia	276	−8	1 stroke	(Australia) Frank Phillips	
1966	Alan Murray	Australia	275	−9	2 strokes	(Australia) Don Sharp (a)	
1967	Walter Godfrey	New Zealand	271	−13	6 strokes	(Australia) Wally Gale (Australia) Col Johnston (Australia) Darrell Welch	
1968	Alan Murray	Australia	273	−11	2 strokes	(New Zealand) Dennis Clark (Australia) Frank Phillips	
1969	Bruce Devlin	Australia	200	−13	1 stroke	(Japan) Takashi Murakami	
1970	Ted Ball	Australia	270	−14	4 strokes	(Australia) Graham Marsh	
