= 1971–72 New Zealand Golf Circuit =

Golf tour season

1971–72 New Zealand Golf Circuit season
- Duration: 18 November 1971 – 8 January 1972
- Number of official events: 7
- Most wins: (New Zealand) Bob Charles (3)
- Money list: (New Zealand) Bob Charles

The 1971–72 New Zealand Golf Circuit was the ninth season of the New Zealand Golf Circuit, the main professional golf tour in New Zealand since it was established in 1963.

== Schedule ==
The following table lists official events during the 1971–72 season.

| Date | Tournament | Location | Purse (NZ$) | Winner (Note: The number in brackets after each winner's name is the number of New Zealand Golf Circuit events they had won up to and including that tournament. This information is only shown for New Zealand Golf Circuit members.) | Notes |
|---|---|---|---|---|---|
| 21 Nov | Garden City Classic | Canterbury | 15,000 | (United States) Jerry Heard (n/a) | |
| 28 Nov | New Zealand Open | Otago | 15,000 | (Australia) Peter Thomson (11) | |
| 5 Dec | Otago Charity Classic | Otago | 15,000 | (New Zealand) Bob Charles (13) | |
| 12 Dec | Caltex Tournament | Wellington | 8,000 | (New Zealand) Bob Charles (14) | |
| 19 Dec | City of Auckland Classic | Auckland | 15,000 | (England) Guy Wolstenholme (2) | New tournament |
| 1 Jan | Spalding Masters | Bay of Plenty | 5,000 | (New Zealand) Bob Charles (15) | |
| 8 Jan | New Zealand PGA Championship | Bay of Plenty | 15,000 | (Japan) Masashi Ozaki (n/a) | |

== Money list ==
The money list was based on tournament results during the season, calculated in New Zealand dollars.

| Position | Player | Prize money (NZ$) |
|---|---|---|
| 1 | (New Zealand) Bob Charles | 10,588 |
