= Bruce Devlin =

Australian professional golfer, sportscaster and golf course designer

Personal information
- Full name: Bruce William Devlin
- Nationality: Australia
- Born: 10 October 1937 (age 89) Armidale, New South Wales, Australia
- Height: 6 ft 1 in (1.85 m)
- Weight: 158 lb (72 kg; 11.3 st)
- Spouse: Gloria

Career
- Sport: Golf
- Turned professional: 1961
- Former tours: PGA Tour; Champions Tour
- Professional wins: 32

Number of wins by tour
- PGA Tour: 8
- PGA Tour of Australasia: 1
- PGA Tour Champions: 1
- Other: 22

Best results in major championships
- Masters Tournament: 4th: 1964, 1968
- PGA Championship: T6: 1965
- U.S. Open: T6: 1965
- The Open Championship: 5th: 1964

Achievements and awards
- New Zealand Golf Circuit money list winner: 1963

Bruce William Devlin (born 10 October 1937) is an Australian professional golfer, sportscaster and golf course designer.

== Early life ==
In 1937, Devlin was born in Armidale, New South Wales, Australia. His parents, Jess and Artie, moved to Goulburn with Bruce, 6 months later, in 1938. Bruce went to school and technical college in Goulburn and played hockey, basketball and golf in and around Goulburn. Bruce married Gloria Gale in Goulburn on the 11 July 1959.

In 1952, Devlin won the Southern Tablelands Open Junior Championship. A title he successfully defended in 1953, at the Tully Park Golf Course. In 1953 he and Perce Tyrie won the Open Foursomes Championship at the Goulburn Golf Club. Then Bruce won his first Goulburn Golf Club Open Championship in 1956. Devlin won the Australian Amateur in 1959.

Devlin's determination to play professional golf, came, in short, from an ultimatum he was given, by a teacher at St Patrick's College in Goulburn: 'It's school or golf Devlin'.

== Professional career ==
In 1961, Devlin turned pro and joined the PGA Tour the following year. During his PGA Tour career, he had eight victories all of which occurred between 1964 and 1972. In 1972, he earned $119,768 and finished eighth on the money list.

In 1970 Devlin teamed with David Graham to represent Australia in the 18th World Cup in Buenos Aires, Argentina. The Australian team held a record advantage of 19 strokes going into the final round. After each of the two Australians shot one-over-par-scores of 73 in the last round, they still won, with a record aggregate of 32-under-par 544 over 144 holes, by eight strokes and finished second and third individually. Devlin and Graham again represented Australia in the 1971 World Cup, but when Devlin was not selected for the event the year after, Graham refused to play and neither Graham nor Devlin participated in any World Cup events again.

At the 72nd hole of the 1975 Andy Williams-San Diego Open Invitational, Devlin shot a 10 after hitting multiple shots into the water in front of the 18th green of the Torrey Pines South Course. The pond was thereafter nicknamed "Devlin’s Billabong".

Devlin is one of only four golfers to have scored a double eagle (three-under-par) at the Masters Tournament. He achieved this in the first round of the 1967 Masters, holing a 4-wood from 248 yards on the par-5 8th hole.

He was briefly featured on the famous Australian television series, Kath and Kim as Sharon's boyfriend. His feature was short-lived, as his character was killed off after only twenty minutes, leaving Sharon in tears once again.

=== Later career ===
On the Senior PGA Tour, Devlin won one tournament, the 1995 FHP Health Care Classic. At the end of the 1998 golf season, Devlin decided to retire from the Senior PGA Tour to concentrate on his Golf Course Architecture and Design business and his commitment to ESPN's golf telecasts.

The main focus of Devlin's career in the past 30 years has been his work as a Golf Course Architect and Designer. Devlin has designed and built more than 150 golf courses throughout the world including Australia, Japan, Scotland, the Bahamas, and the United States. About two-thirds of the golf courses he designed have been in Florida and Texas. Many of these courses have hosted all of the professional golf tours, including: The Houston Open, HealthSouth LPGA Classic, Key Biscayne Golf Classic, and The Nike Cleveland Open. His golf design business is based in Scottsdale, Arizona.

Devlin has also worked as a television commentator. He worked for NBC from 1977 to 1982; ESPN from 1983 to 1987; and since 1999 has occasionally covered professional golf for ESPN.

== Personal life ==
Bruce and Gloria have three children, Kelvin, Kerrie and Kurt, eight grandchildren and seven great-grandchildren. Gloria died in 2022.

== Amateur wins ==
this list may be incomplete

- 1958 Lake Macquarie Amateur, New South Wales Amateur
- 1959 Australian Amateur

== Professional wins (32) ==
=== PGA Tour wins (8) ===
No.	Date	Tournament	Winning score	Margin of victory	Runner(s)-up
1	15 Mar 1964	St. Petersburg Open Invitational	−16 (69-64-69-70=272)	4 strokes	(United States) Dan Sikes
2	22 May 1966	Colonial National Invitation	E (67-68-70-75=280)	1 stroke	(United States) R. H. Sikes
3	3 Sep 1966	Carling World Open	−6 (73-70-74-69=286)	1 stroke	(United States) Billy Casper
4	27 Apr 1969	Byron Nelson Golf Classic	−3 (71-66-70-70=277)	1 stroke	(United States) Frank Beard, (Australia) Bruce Crampton
5	8 Feb 1970	Bob Hope Desert Classic	−21 (67-68-68-70-66=339)	4 strokes	(United States) Larry Ziegler
6	28 Jun 1970	Cleveland Open	−12 (69-69-66-64=268)	4 strokes	(United States) Steve Eichstaedt
7	8 May 1972	Houston Open	−10 (69-70-67-72=278)	2 strokes	(United States) Tommy Aaron, (United States) Lou Graham, (United States) Doug Sanders
8	20 Aug 1972	USI Classic	−13 (69-68-69-69=275)	3 strokes	(United States) Lee Elder

PGA Tour playoff record (0–3)

No.	Year	Tournament	Opponent(s)	Result
1	1968	Bing Crosby National Pro-Am	(United States) Billy Casper, (United States) Johnny Pott	Pott won with birdie on first extra hole
2	1969	Atlanta Classic	(United States) Bert Yancey	Lost to birdie on second extra hole
3	1972	Cleveland Open	(Australia) David Graham	Lost to birdie on second extra hole

=== PGA Tour of Australia wins (1) ===
No.	Date	Tournament	Winning score	Margin of victory	Runner-up
1	4 Dec 1983	Air New Zealand Shell Open	−10 (67-67-66=200) (Note: Shortened to 36/54 holes due to weather.)	1 stroke	(United States) Bobby Clampett

=== New Zealand Golf Circuit wins (3) ===
No.	Date	Tournament	Winning score	Margin of victory	Runner(s)-up
1	7 Sep 1963	Wills Classic	−6 (69-74-71-71=287)	4 strokes	(Australia) Ted Ball, (Australia) Kel Nagle
2	21 Sep 1963	Caltex Tournament	−18 (68-68-69-69=274)	3 strokes	(Australia) Darrell Welch
3	28 Sep 1963	New Zealand Open	−11 (68-70-66-69=273)	1 stroke	(Australia) Peter Thomson

=== Other Australian wins (16) ===
- 1959 Victorian Close Championship (as an amateur)
- 1960 Australian Open (as an amateur)
- 1962 Wills Classic, Victorian Open
- 1963 Queensland Open, Victorian Open, Adelaide Advertiser Tournament (tie with Frank Phillips)
- 1964 Victorian PGA Championship
- 1965 Wills Masters, Dunlop International
- 1967 Lakes Open
- 1968 Dunlop International
- 1969 Australian PGA Championship, Dunlop International, City of Sydney Open
- 1970 Australian PGA Championship

=== Other wins (3) ===
- 1963 French Open
- 1970 Alcan Golfer of the Year Championship, World Cup (team with David Graham)

=== Senior PGA Tour wins (1) ===
No.	Date	Tournament	Winning score	Margin of victory	Runner-up
1	5 Mar 1995	FHP Health Care Classic	−10 (64-66=130)	Playoff	(United States) Dave Eichelberger

Senior PGA Tour playoff record (1–0)

No.	Year	Tournament	Opponent	Result
1	1995	FHP Health Care Classic	(United States) Dave Eichelberger	Won with birdie on second extra hole

== Results in major championships ==
Tournament	1962	1963	1964	1965	1966	1967	1968	1969
Masters Tournament	CUT		4	T15	T28	T10	4	T19
U.S. Open	CUT		CUT	T6	T26	T23	T9	T10
The Open Championship	CUT	T33	5	T8	T4	T8	T10	T16
PGA Championship			T39	T6	T28	WD		T32

Tournament	1970	1971	1972	1973	1974	1975	1976	1977	1978	1979
Masters Tournament	T31	T13	T5	T8	T31	T15	T19	T42		
U.S. Open	T8	T27	T65	CUT			T60	CUT		
The Open Championship	T25	T37	T26	T18	T39					
PGA Championship	T18	T13	CUT	T24	T22	T50		T51		

Tournament	1980	1981	1982	1983
Masters Tournament		T31		CUT
U.S. Open	T12	T26	T10	T65
The Open Championship				
PGA Championship	T30	CUT		

Top 10
Did not play

WD = withdrew
CUT = missed the half-way cut
"T" indicates a tie for a place

=== Summary ===
Tournament	Wins	2nd	3rd	Top-5	Top-10	Top-25	Events	Cuts made
Masters Tournament	0	0	0	3	5	10	17	15
U.S. Open	0	0	0	0	5	7	17	13
The Open Championship	0	0	0	2	5	8	13	12
PGA Championship	0	0	0	0	1	5	14	11
Totals	0	0	0	5	16	30	61	51

- Most consecutive cuts made – 18 (1968 Masters – 1972 Open Championship)
- Longest streak of top-10s – 3 (twice)

== Team appearances ==
these lists may be incomplete

Amateur

- Eisenhower Trophy (representing Australia): 1958 (team winners and individual leader, tie), 1960
- Commonwealth Tournament (representing Australia): 1959
- Australian Men's Interstate Teams Matches (representing New South Wales): 1957 (winners), 1958 (winners), 1959 (winners), 1960 (winners)

Professional

- World Cup (representing Australia): 1963, 1964, 1966, 1970 (winners), 1971
