= New Zealand PGA Championship =

Golf tournament

Quinovic New Zealand PGA Championship
Tournament information
- Location: Paraparaumu Beach, New Zealand
- Established: 1909
- Course: Paraparaumu Beach Golf Club
- Par: 70
- Length: 6,654 yards (6,084 m)
- Tours: PGA Tour of Australasia; New Zealand Golf Circuit; Nationwide Tour; Charles Tour
- Format: Stroke play Match play
- Prize fund: A$200,000
- Month played: February

Tournament record score
- Aggregate: 262 John Lister (1971)
- To par: −30 as above
- Score: 12 and 10 Andrew Shaw (1931)

Current champion
- (United States) Austen Truslow

Final champion
- Location in New Zealand

The New Zealand PGA Championship is an annual golf tournament held by the New Zealand PGA. It is generally an event on the PGA Tour of Australasia but in some years has been held as a non-tour event. In 2024, it was held on the Charles Tour for the first time.

== History ==
The tournament been played since 1909, with some gap periods. It was originally a match play event and switched to stroke play in 1965. Major championship winners who have claimed the New Zealand PGA title include Sir Bob Charles, Peter Thomson, Kel Nagle, and Tony Jacklin. The event is also notable for Masashi Ozaki's lone international win.

Sponsorship problems caused the tournament to be terminated after the 1987 event. In 2002, a PGA Tour of Australasia and U.S.-based Nationwide Tour co-sanctioned event, called the Holden Clearwater Classic was started at the Clearwater Resort in Christchurch, New Zealand. It was played again in 2003 and in 2004 the event resumed the name New Zealand PGA Championship. Co-sanctioning with the Nationwide Tour ended after 2009. The event was not held in 2020 and was run in 2021 as a non-tour event. The event was cancelled in 2022 and returned as a tour event in 2023. However it was again a non-tour event in 2024.

== Winners ==
Year	Tour(s) (Note: ANZ − PGA Tour of Australasia; BUY/NWT − Buy.com Tour/Nationwide Tour; CHAR − Charles Tour; NZGC − New Zealand Golf Circuit.)	Winner	Score	To par	Margin of victory	Runner(s)-up	Venue	Ref.
Quinovic New Zealand PGA Championship
2026	ANZ	(United States) Austen Truslow	274	−6	3 strokes	(New Zealand) Cooper Moore (a)	Paraparaumu Beach	
Wallace Development New Zealand PGA Championship
2025	ANZ	(New Zealand) Tyler Hodge	272	−16	1 stroke	(Australia) Tim Hart (New Zealand) Kerry Mountcastle	Hastings	
2024	CHAR	(New Zealand) Pieter Zwart	273	−15	1 stroke	(New Zealand) Mason Lee	Hastings	
NZ PGA Championship
2023	ANZ	(Australia) Louis Dobbelaar	268	−20	3 strokes	(New Zealand) Sung Jin Yeo	Gulf Harbour	
2022	ANZ	Cancelled due to the COVID-19 pandemic						
New Zealand PGA Championship
2021		(New Zealand) Tae Koh	265	−23	1 stroke	(New Zealand) Josh Geary	Te Puke	
2020: No tournament
SEC NZ PGA Championship
2019	ANZ	(New Zealand) Kazuma Kobori (a)	267	−21	4 strokes	(New Zealand) David Smail	Pegasus	
Horizon Golf New Zealand PGA Championship
2018	ANZ	(New Zealand) Ben Campbell	266	−18	2 strokes	(Australia) Ashley Hall (Australia) Deyen Lawson	Manawatu	
Lawnmaster Horizon Golf New Zealand PGA Championship
2017	ANZ	(Australia) Jarryd Felton	270	−14	Playoff	(New Zealand) Ben Campbell (Australia) Josh Younger	Manawatu	
Holden New Zealand PGA Championship
2016	ANZ	(Australia) Brad Kennedy	266	−22	2 strokes	(Australia) Neven Basic (New Zealand) Josh Geary	Remuera	
2015	ANZ	(Australia) Matthew Millar	270	−18	3 strokes	(Australia) Geoff Drakeford (New Zealand) Josh Geary (Australia) Kristopher Mueck	Remuera	
New Zealand PGA Championship
2014: No tournament
2013	ANZ	(New Zealand) Michael Hendry (2)	269	−19	Playoff	(Australia) Scott Strange	The Hills	
New Zealand PGA Pro-Am Championship
2012	ANZ	(New Zealand) Michael Hendry	272	−16	2 strokes	(New Zealand) Mark Brown (Australia) Andrew Martin	The Hills	
New Zealand PGA Championship
2011: No tournament
2010	ANZ	(Australia) Mitchell Brown	281	−7	Playoff	(Australia) Ashley Hall	Clearwater	
HSBC New Zealand PGA Championship
2009	ANZ, NWT	(New Zealand) Steven Alker	273	−15	2 strokes	(New Zealand) Josh Geary (New Zealand) David Smail	Clearwater	
2008	ANZ, NWT	(United States) Darron Stiles (Note: Player graduated to the PGA Tour via the final Nationwide Tour money list.)	134 (Note: Shortened to 36 holes due to rain. Due to the event's length, this win is not officially recognized as a Nationwide Tour victory.)	−10	1 stroke	(New Zealand) David Smail	Clearwater	
2007	ANZ, NWT	(United States) Nicholas Thompson	280	−8	Playoff	(Canada) David Morland IV	Clearwater	
ING New Zealand PGA Championship
2006	ANZ, NWT	(Canada) Jim Rutledge	279	−9	1 stroke	(Australia) Jarrod Lyle (Australia) Brett Rumford	Clearwater	
2005	ANZ, NWT	(Australia) Peter O'Malley (2)	274	−14	Playoff	(Australia) Steven Bowditch	Clearwater	
New Zealand PGA Championship
2004	ANZ, NWT	(Australia) Gavin Coles	282	−6	3 strokes	(Australia) Bradley Hughes (Australia) Brendan Jones (United States) Bill Lunde	Clearwater	
Clearwater Classic
2003	ANZ, NWT	(United States) Ryan Palmer	271	−17	3 strokes	(Australia) Andre Stolz	Clearwater	
Holden Clearwater Classic
2002	ANZ, BUY	(Australia) Peter O'Malley	271	−17	5 strokes	(United States) Brad Ott	Clearwater	
New Zealand PGA Championship
1988–2001: No tournament
1987		(New Zealand) Frank Nobilo (2)						
1986: No tournament
Nissan-Mobil New Zealand PGA Championship
1985	ANZ	(New Zealand) Frank Nobilo	280	−8	2 strokes	(Australia) Brett Ogle	Mount Maunganui	
New Zealand PGA Championship
1984	ANZ	(New Zealand) Greg Turner	282	−6	3 strokes	(Australia) Frank Nobilo	Mount Maunganui	
1983	ANZ	(Australia) Graham Marsh	277	−11	2 strokes	(Australia) Vaughan Somers	Mount Maunganui	
1982	ANZ	(New Zealand) Stuart Reese	277	−11	1 stroke	(Australia) Jack Newton	Mount Maunganui	
1981 (Nov)	ANZ	(Australia) Terry Gale	269	−11	Playoff	(New Zealand) Bob Charles	Tauranga	
1981 (Jan)	ANZ	(Australia) Brian Jones	280	−4	Playoff	(New Zealand) Dennis Clark (New Zealand) John Lister	Mount Maunganui	
1980	NZGC	(New Zealand) Bob Charles (3)	261	−19	6 strokes	(Australia) Rodger Davis	Tauranga	
1979	NZGC	(New Zealand) Bob Charles (2)	277	−7	3 strokes	(England) Guy Wolstenholme	Mount Maunganui	
1978	NZGC	(New Zealand) Simon Owen	274	−6	1 stroke	(England) Guy Wolstenholme	Tauranga	
1977	NZGC	(New Zealand) John Lister (3)	274	−10	1 stroke	(New Zealand) Bob Charles (England) John Downie	Mount Maunganui	
1976	NZGC	(New Zealand) John Lister (2)	263	−17	Playoff	(United States) Bill Brask	Tauranga	
1975	NZGC	(Australia) Kel Nagle (7)	267	−17	5 strokes	(Australia) Lindsay Sharp	Mount Maunganui	
1974	NZGC	(Australia) Kel Nagle (6)	264	−16	2 strokes	(New Zealand) Walter Godfrey	Tauranga	
1973	NZGC	(Australia) Kel Nagle (5)	275	−9	4 strokes	(New Zealand) John Carter	Mount Maunganui	
1972	NZGC	(Japan) Masashi Ozaki	269	−15	7 strokes	(New Zealand) Bob Charles (Japan) Takashi Murakami	Mount Maunganui	
Forest Products Stars Travel New Zealand PGA Championship
1971	NZGC	(New Zealand) John Lister	262	−30	8 strokes	(Australia) Vic Bennetts (Australia) Graham Marsh	Mount Maunganui	
1970	NZGC	(Australia) Kel Nagle (4)	268	−24	3 strokes	(New Zealand) John Lister	Mount Maunganui	
Stars Travel New Zealand PGA Championship
1969	NZGC	(New Zealand) Terry Kendall	274	−18	1 stroke	(New Zealand) Bob Charles (New Zealand) John Lister	Mount Maunganui	
1968		(Australia) Bob Shaw	278	−14	1 stroke	(New Zealand) Walter Godfrey (Australia) Bob Stanton	Mount Maunganui	
New Zealand PGA Championship
1967		(England) Tony Jacklin	274	−18	Playoff	(Netherlands) Martin Roesink	Mount Maunganui	
1966		(New Zealand) Ross Newdick	280	−12	1 stroke	(Australia) Barry Coxon	Mount Maunganui	
1965		(Australia) Barry Coxon	209	−4	2 strokes	(Australia) Bob Tuohy	Mount Maunganui	
1964: No tournament
1963		(Australia) Bob Tuohy	6 and 5			(New Zealand) Walter Godfrey	Wanganui	
1962		(New Zealand) Ernie Southerden (3)	1 up			(New Zealand) Frank Buckler	Titirangi	
1961		(New Zealand) Bob Charles	10 and 9			(New Zealand) Joe Paterson	New Plymouth	
1960		(Australia) Kel Nagle (3)	5 and 4			(New Zealand) Bob Charles	Invergarcill	
1959		(New Zealand) Ernie Southerden (2)	37 holes			(New Zealand) Michael Busk	Paraparaumu Beach	
1958		(Australia) Kel Nagle (2)	6 and 5			(New Zealand) John Kelly	Hamilton	
1957		(Australia) Kel Nagle	2 and 1			(New Zealand) Alex Murray	Manawatu	
1956		(New Zealand) John Kelly	1 up			(New Zealand) Ernie Southerden	Christchurch	
1955		(Australia) Frank Phillips	1 up			(Australia) Bruce Crampton	Auckland	
1954		(Australia) Bruce Crampton	2 and 1			(New Zealand) Jimmy Tunnell	Wellington	
1953		(Australia) Peter Thomson	9 and 7			(New Zealand) Alex Murray	Otago	
1952		(New Zealand) George Hudson	1 up			(New Zealand) Jimmy Tunnell	Wanganui	
1951		(New Zealand) Bob Jackson	5 and 3			(New Zealand) Alex Murray	Titirangi	
1950		(New Zealand) Ernie Southerden	1 up			(New Zealand) Alex Murray	Christchurch	
1949		(New Zealand) Bob Glading	2 up			(New Zealand) Jim Galloway	Hastings	
1948		(New Zealand) Alex Murray (4)	1 up			(New Zealand) Andrew Shaw	Otago	
1947		(New Zealand) Alex Murray (3)	7 and 6			(New Zealand) Alf Guy	New Plymouth	
1946		(New Zealand) Andrew Shaw (7)	6 and 5			(New Zealand) Alex Murray	Manawatu	
1940–1945: No tournament due to World War II
1939		(New Zealand) Alex Murray (2)	8 and 6			(New Zealand) Tom Galloway	Miramar	
1938		(New Zealand) Norman Fuller	4 and 3			(New Zealand) Alf Guy	Otago	
1937		(Scotland) Ted Douglas (3)	3 and 2			(New Zealand) Basil Smith Jr.	Hamilton	
1936		(New Zealand) Charlie Clements	3 and 2			(New Zealand) Andrew Shaw	New Plymouth	
1935		(New Zealand) Alex Murray	2 and 1			(New Zealand) Andrew Shaw	Christchurch	
1934		(New Zealand) Andrew Shaw (6)	1 up			(Scotland) Ted Douglas	Wanganui	
1933		(New Zealand) Andrew Shaw (5)	6 and 5			(New Zealand) Aubrey Dyke	Titirangi	
1932		(New Zealand) Andrew Shaw (4)	4 and 3			(Scotland) Ted Douglas	Wellington	
1931		(New Zealand) Andrew Shaw (3)	12 and 10			(New Zealand) James Forrest	Christchurch	
1930		(New Zealand) Fred Rutter	6 and 4			(New Zealand) Jock McIntosh	Manawatu	
1929		(New Zealand) Andrew Shaw (2)	2 and 1			(New Zealand) Ernie Moss	Wanganui	
1928		(New Zealand) Andrew Shaw	6 and 5			(New Zealand) Jock McIntosh	Otago	
1927		(New Zealand) Jock McIntosh (2)	5 and 4			(New Zealand) Reg Butters	Hamilton	
1926		(New Zealand) Jock McIntosh	9 and 7			(New Zealand) Andrew Shaw	Miramar	
1925		(New Zealand) Ernie Moss (3)	4 and 3			(New Zealand) Harry Blair	Christchurch	
1924		(New Zealand) Ernie Moss (2)	5 and 3			(New Zealand) Jock McIntosh	Auckland	
1923		(New Zealand) Ernie Moss	4 and 2			(New Zealand) Arthur Brooks	Wanganui	
1922		(England) Arthur Ham	2 and 1			(New Zealand) Andrew Shaw	Manawatu	
1921		(Scotland) Ted Douglas (2)	2 up			(New Zealand) Ernie Moss	Christchurch	
1920		(New Zealand) Joe Kirkwood Sr.	3 and 2			(Australia) Arthur East	Hamilton	
1919		(New Zealand) Willie McEwan	4 and 3			(New Zealand) Reg Butters	Napier	
1915–1918: No tournament due to World War I
1914		(Scotland) Ted Douglas	1 up			(Scotland) Willie McEwan	Auckland	
1913		(Australia) W Iles	1 up			(New Zealand) Joe Clements	Otago	
1912		(New Zealand) Reg Butters	4 and 2			(Scotland) W B Simpson	Otago	
1911		(New Zealand) Joe Clements (2)	3 and 2			(Scotland) Willie McEwan	Wanganui	
1910		(Scotland) James Herd	6 and 5			(New Zealand) Joe Clements	Christchurch	
1909		(New Zealand) Joe Clements	3 and 2			(Scotland) Fred Hood	Auckland	

== See also ==
- New Zealand Open
- Golf in New Zealand
