= Stuart Jones (golfer) =

New Zealand amateur golfer

Personal information
- Full name: Stuart Gwyn Jones
- Nationality: New Zealand
- Born: 15 July 1925 Hastings, New Zealand
- Died: 18 July 2012 (aged 87)

Career
- Sport: Golf
- Status: Amateur

Stuart Gwyn Jones MBE (15 July 1925 – 18 July 2012) was a leading amateur golfer from New Zealand.

== Golf career ==
Jones won the New Zealand Amateur seven times between 1955 and 1971. He also won the Canadian Amateur Championship in 1967, beating fellow New Zealander Ross Murray in the final, the two being part of the New Zealand team that had just competed in the Commonwealth Tournament. Jones was runner-up in the 1970 Spanish International Amateur Championship. He also won two professional tournaments in New Zealand, the 1965 Wattie's Tournament and the 1970 Spalding Masters. In 1955 he was runner-up to Peter Thomson in the Wiseman's Tournament.

Jones represented New Zealand at international level from 1953 to 1975. He played in the Eisenhower Trophy seven times between 1958 and 1972. He played in all six Commonwealth Tournament matches and also eight times against Australia in the Sloan Morpeth Trophy.

== Amateur wins ==
- 1955 New Zealand Amateur
- 1959 New Zealand Amateur
- 1961 New Zealand Amateur
- 1962 New Zealand Amateur
- 1964 New Zealand Amateur
- 1966 New Zealand Amateur
- 1967 Canadian Amateur Championship
- 1971 New Zealand Amateur

== Professional wins (2) ==
=== New Zealand Golf Circuit wins (2) ===
No.	Date	Tournament	Winning score	Margin of victory	Runner-up
1	30 Nov 1965	Wattie's Tournament (as an amateur)	−10 (69-65-67-69=270)	2 strokes	(Australia) John Sullivan
2	5 Jan 1970	Spalding Masters (as an amateur)	−6 (68-71-70-65=274)	1 stroke	(Australia) Barry Coxon

== Awards and honors ==
- Jones was appointed a Member of the Order of the British Empire, for services to golf, in the 1977 New Year Honours.
- In 1995, Jones was inducted into the New Zealand Sports Hall of Fame.
- Jones has been inducted into the New Zealand Golf Hall of Fame.

== Team appearances ==
- Commonwealth Tournament (representing New Zealand): 1954, 1959, 1963, 1967 (tied), 1971, 1975
- Eisenhower Trophy (representing New Zealand): 1958, 1960, 1962, 1964, 1966, 1970, 1972
- Sloan Morpeth Trophy (representing New Zealand): 1953, 1956, 1961 (winners), 1964, 1965 (winners), 1966, 1967, 1969
