= Caltex Tournament =

Golf tournament in New Zealand

Tournament information
- Location: Paraparaumu, New Zealand
- Established: 1955
- Course: Paraparaumu Beach Golf Club
- Par: 71
- Tour: New Zealand Golf Circuit
- Format: Stroke play
- Prize fund: NZ$10,000
- Month played: December
- Final year: 1972

Tournament record score
- Aggregate: 273 Bill Dunk (1972)
- To par: −18 Bruce Devlin (1963)

Final champion
- (Australia) Bill Dunk

Location map
- Location in New Zealand

The Caltex Tournament was a golf tournament held at Paraparaumu Beach Golf Club in Paraparaumu, New Zealand, from 1955 to 1972.

== History ==
Bob Charles and Peter Thomson each won the event five times, while Kel Nagle won it four times and Dave Thomas won it twice. There were no playoffs and three of the tournaments ended in a tie.

From 1963 the tournament was part of the New Zealand Golf Circuit.

== Winners ==
Year	Winner	Score	To par	Margin of victory	Runner(s)-up	Ref.
1972	(Australia) Bill Dunk	273	−11	3 strokes	(Australia) Jack Newton	
1971	(New Zealand) Bob Charles (5)	274	−10	2 strokes	(England) Guy Wolstenholme	
1970	(England) Maurice Bembridge (New Zealand) Terry Kendall	286	+2	Title shared		
1969	(Australia) Kel Nagle (4)	275	−9	7 strokes	(Australia) Bill Dunk (New Zealand) John Lister	
1968	(New Zealand) Bob Charles (4)	197 (Note: Shortened to 54 holes due to weather.)	−13	10 strokes	(Australia) Tony Mangan (Australia) Randall Vines	
1967	(New Zealand) Bob Charles (3) (Australia) Peter Thomson (5)	278	−14	Title shared		
1966	(Australia) Kel Nagle (3) (Australia) Peter Thomson (4)	276	−4	Title shared		
1965	(Australia) Peter Thomson (3)	282	−10	2 strokes	(South Africa) Cedric Amm (Australia) John Sullivan	
1964	(Australia) Kel Nagle (2)	285	−7	1 stroke	(Australia) John Sullivan	
1963	(Australia) Bruce Devlin	274	−18	3 strokes	(Australia) Darrell Welch	
1962	(New Zealand) Bob Charles (2)	277		5 strokes	(Australia) Kel Nagle	
1961	(New Zealand) Bob Charles	289		4 strokes	(Australia) Kel Nagle	
1960	(Australia) Kel Nagle	277		8 strokes	(Australia) Peter Thomson	
1959	(Australia) Peter Thomson (2)	278		5 strokes	(Spain) Ángel Miguel	
1958	(Wales) Dave Thomas (2)	290		4 strokes	(South Africa) Gary Player	
1957	(Wales) Dave Thomas	295		3 strokes	(Australia) Peter Thomson	
1956	(New Zealand) Bryan Silk (a)	299		1 stroke	(New Zealand) Ernie Southerden	
1955	(Australia) Peter Thomson	283		3 strokes	(Australia) Kel Nagle	
