= Subang National Golf Club =

Golf course in Kelana Jaya, Selangor, Malaysia

Coordinates: 3.087959°N 101.596312°E

Subang National Golf Club (Malay: Kelab Golf Negara Subang) is a golf courses in Kelana Jaya, Selangor, Malaysia and consists of two 18-hole courses.

Opened in 1968, it has hosted several significant golf tournaments in its history. It hosted the Malaysian Dunlop Masters several times in the 1970s and 1980s. It also hosted the Malaysian Open in 1983, 1987, and 1991.

== History ==
The golf club was opened on 1 September 1968 as the Subang Golf Course. Its clubhouse was temporarily based at a bungalow nearby before moving to a permanent one in September 1971.

In 1977 Walter Godfrey started working as the club pro. He worked at the club for five years. During his tenure at Subang National he won the 1979 Dunlop Masters.

== Tournaments hosted ==
- 1991 Malaysian Open, Asia Golf Circuit event
- 1987 Malaysian Open, Asia Golf Circuit event
- 1983 Malaysian Open, Asia Golf Circuit event
- 1982 Malaysian Dunlop Masters
- 1979 Malaysian Dunlop Masters
- 1978 Malaysian Dunlop Masters
- 1975 Malaysian Dunlop Masters
