= Andrew Shaw (golfer) =

New Zealand golfer

Andrew Jenkins Shaw (b. 19 December 1898 – 1983) was a professional golfer from Scotland who played extensively in New Zealand.

== Early life ==
In 1898, Shaw was born in Scotland. Shaw learnt his golf at Troon in Scotland.

== Career ==
In 1920, Shaw arrived in Christchurch, New Zealand and was a member of Avondale Golf Club. He left in 1921 to take up a professional coaching position at Hamilton Golf Club. However, he was only briefly at Hamilton, returning to Christchurch in 1922 as professional at Hagley Golf Club before taking a position at a golf school in Wellington in 1924.

Shaw was a seven-time winner of the New Zealand PGA Championship (1928, 1929, 1931–1934, 1946). He was also a seven-time winner of the New Zealand Open (1926, 1929–1932, 1934, 1936).

== Personal life ==
In 1932, it was reported by The Sydney Morning Herald that Shaw was forced to pay "maintenance" to his wife and child due to "persistent cruelty."

In 1983, Shaw died in New Zealand.

== Professional wins (14) ==
- 1926 New Zealand Open
- 1928 New Zealand PGA Championship
- 1929 New Zealand PGA Championship, New Zealand Open
- 1930 New Zealand Open
- 1931 New Zealand PGA Championship, New Zealand Open
- 1932 New Zealand PGA Championship, New Zealand Open
- 1933 New Zealand PGA Championship
- 1934 New Zealand PGA Championship, New Zealand Open
- 1936 New Zealand Open
- 1946 New Zealand PGA Championship
