= 1968–69 New Zealand Golf Circuit =

Golf tour season

1968–69 New Zealand Golf Circuit season
- Duration: 21 November 1968 – 8 January 1969
- Number of official events: 7
- Most wins: (New Zealand) Bob Charles (3)
- Money list: (New Zealand) Bob Charles

The 1968–69 New Zealand Golf Circuit was the sixth season of the New Zealand Golf Circuit, the main professional golf tour in New Zealand since it was established in 1963.

== Schedule ==
The following table lists official events during the 1968–69 season.

Date	Tournament	Location	Purse (NZ$)	Winner (Note: The number in brackets after each winner's name is the number of New Zealand Golf Circuit events they had won up to and including that tournament. This information is only shown for New Zealand Golf Circuit members.)	Notes
23 Nov	Sax Altman Tournament	Waikato	5,000	(Australia) Peter Thomson (10) (England) Guy Wolstenholme (1)	New tournament Title shared
30 Nov	New Zealand Open	Canterbury	5,000	(Australia) Kel Nagle (9)	
7 Dec	Caltex Tournament	Wellington	5,000	(New Zealand) Bob Charles (9)	
10 Dec	Wattie's Tournament	Hawke's Bay	4,000	(New Zealand) Bob Charles (10)	
15 Dec	BP Tournament	Auckland	5,000	(Australia) Kel Nagle (10)	
4 Jan	Spalding Masters	Bay of Plenty	4,000	(New Zealand) Bob Charles (11)	New to New Zealand Golf Circuit
8 Jan	Stars Travel New Zealand PGA Championship	Bay of Plenty	5,000	(New Zealand) Terry Kendall (1)	New to New Zealand Golf Circuit

== Money list ==
The money list was based on tournament results during the season, calculated in New Zealand dollars.

Position	Player	Prize money (NZ$)
1	(New Zealand) Bob Charles	
