= 1964 New Zealand Golf Circuit =

Golf tour season

1964 New Zealand Golf Circuit season
- Duration: 19 November 1964 – 19 December 1964
- Number of official events: 8
- Most wins: (Australia) Bill Dunk (4)
- Money list: (Australia) Kel Nagle

The 1964 New Zealand Golf Circuit was the second season of the New Zealand Golf Circuit, the main professional golf tour in New Zealand since it was established in 1963.

== Schedule ==
The following table lists official events during the 1964 season.

Date	Tournament	Location	Purse (£NZ)	Winner (Note: The number in brackets after each winner's name is the number of New Zealand Golf Circuit events they had won up to and including that tournament. This information is only shown for New Zealand Golf Circuit members.)	Notes
21 Nov	New Zealand Open	Canterbury	1,200	(Australia) Kel Nagle (2)	
24 Nov	Metalcraft Tournament	Manawatu-Wanganui	1,000	(Australia) Bill Dunk (1)	
28 Nov	Caltex Tournament	Wellington	2,000	(Australia) Kel Nagle (3)	
1 Dec	Forest Products Tournament	Waikato	1,200	(Australia) Peter Thomson (2)	New tournament
5 Dec	Wiseman's Tournament	Auckland	2,000	(Australia) Bill Dunk (2)	
8 Dec	Wattie's Tournament	Hawke's Bay	1,500	(Australia) Bill Dunk (3) (South Africa) Cobie Legrange (n/a)	Title shared
12 Dec	Wills Classic	Wellington	2,000	(Australia) Ted Ball (2)	
19 Dec	BP Tournament	Auckland	2,000	(Australia) Bill Dunk (4)	New tournament

== Money list ==
The money list was based on tournament results during the season, calculated in New Zealand pounds.

Position	Player	Prize money (£NZ)
1	(Australia) Kel Nagle	1,741
2	(Australia) Bill Dunk	1,482
3	(Australia) Ted Ball	1,016
4	(South Africa) Cobie Legrange	970
5	(Australia) John Sullivan	874
