= 1967 New Zealand Golf Circuit =

Golf tour season

1967 New Zealand Golf Circuit season
- Duration: 15 November 1967 – 16 December 1967
- Number of official events: 7
- Most wins: (New Zealand) Bob Charles (3)
- Money list: (New Zealand) Bob Charles

The 1967 New Zealand Golf Circuit was the fifth season of the New Zealand Golf Circuit, the main professional golf tour in New Zealand since it was established in 1963.

== Schedule ==
The following table lists official events during the 1967 season.

Date	Tournament	Location	Purse (NZ$)	Winner (Note: The number in brackets after each winner's name is the number of New Zealand Golf Circuit events they had won up to and including that tournament. This information is only shown for New Zealand Golf Circuit members.)	Notes
18 Nov	New Zealand Open	Waikato	3,600	(Australia) Kel Nagle (8)	
21 Nov	Wattie's Tournament	Hawke's Bay	3,000	(New Zealand) Bob Charles (6)	
26 Nov	Caltex Tournament	Wellington	4,000	(New Zealand) Bob Charles (7) (Australia) Peter Thomson (9)	Title shared
27 Nov	Land Rover Tournament	Manawatu-Wanganui	2,000	(Australia) Barry Coxon (2)	New tournament
2 Dec	New Zealand Wills Masters	Canterbury	4,000	(New Zealand) Bob Charles (8) (Netherlands) Martin Roesink (1)	Title shared
9 Dec	BP Tournament	Auckland	4,000	(New Zealand) Walter Godfrey (1)	
9 Dec	Metalcraft Tournament	Wellington	4,000	(New Zealand) Walter Godfrey (2)	

== Money list ==
The money list was based on tournament results during the season, calculated in New Zealand dollars.

Position	Player	Prize money (NZ$)
1	(New Zealand) Bob Charles	3,040
2	(New Zealand) Walter Godfrey	2,378
3	(Australia) Kel Nagle	2,120
4	(Australia) Peter Thomson	1,815
5	(England) Guy Wolstenholme	1,360
