= 1978–79 New Zealand Golf Circuit =

Golf tour season

1978–79 New Zealand Golf Circuit season
- Duration: 23 November 1978 – 2 January 1979
- Number of official events: 4
- Most wins: (New Zealand) Bob Charles (2)
- Money list: (New Zealand) Bob Charles

The 1978–79 New Zealand Golf Circuit was the 16th season of the New Zealand Golf Circuit, the main professional golf tour in New Zealand since it was established in 1963.

== Schedule ==
The following table lists official events during the 1978–79 season.

Date	Tournament	Location	Purse (NZ$)	Winner (Note: The number in brackets after each winner's name is the number of New Zealand Golf Circuit events they had won up to and including that tournament. This information is only shown for New Zealand Golf Circuit members.)	Notes
26 Nov	Otago Charity Classic	Otago	40,000	(United States) Mike Krantz (1)	
3 Dec	Air New Zealand Shell Open	Auckland	75,000	(New Zealand) Bob Charles (18)	
10 Dec	New Zealand Open	Manawatu-Wanganui	50,000	(Australia) Bob Shearer (2)	
2 Jan	New Zealand PGA Championship	Bay of Plenty	30,000	(New Zealand) Bob Charles (19)	

== Money list ==
The money list was based on tournament results during the season, calculated in New Zealand dollars.

Position	Player	Prize money (NZ$)
1	(New Zealand) Bob Charles	21,548
2	(United States) Mike Krantz	9,403
3	(Australia) Bob Shearer	9,225
4	(Australia) Graham Marsh	9,000
5	(Australia) Rodger Davis	7,395
