= Wagga City Open =

Golf tournament

The Wagga City Open was a golf tournament played in Wagga Wagga, New South Wales, Australia in the 1960s.

Prize money was £750 in 1962, £1,000 in 1964 and 1965, A$2,000 in 1966 and 1967, and A$3,000 in 1968 and 1969.

== Winners ==
This list is incomplete

Year	Winner	Country	Score	To par	Margin of victory	Runner(s)-up	Ref
1962	Bob Swinbourne; Darrell Welch	Australia; Australia	203	−7	Tied		
1963	John Davis	Australia	207	−3			
1964	Ted Ball	Australia	273	−7	2 strokes	(Australia) Kel Nagle	
1965	Kel Nagle	Australia	265	−15	3 strokes	(Australia) Alan Murray	
1966	Alan Murray	Australia	278	−2	1 stroke	(Australia) Ted Ball	
1967	Alan Murray	Australia	276	−4	3 strokes	(Australia) Alan Brookes (New Zealand) Walter Godfrey	
1968	Walter Godfrey	New Zealand	197	−12	2 strokes	(Australia) Randall Vines	
1969							
