= Walter Godfrey (golfer) =

New Zealand golfer (born 1941)

Personal information
- Full name: Walter John Ihaka Godfrey
- Nationality: New Zealand
- Born: October 1941 (age 85)

Career
- Sport: Golf
- Status: Professional
- Professional wins: 11

Best results in major championships
- Masters Tournament: DNP
- PGA Championship: DNP
- U.S. Open: DNP
- The Open Championship: T22: 1970

Walter John Ihaka Godfrey (born October 1941) is a professional golfer from New Zealand.

== Early life ==
Godfrey is from Matamata, New Zealand. He was a star golfer in his youth. Godfrey won a number of school championships in his youth before reaching the finals of the Auckland Schoolboys' Championship at the age of 13, losing to a student named JB Williams (caddie Steve Williams' father).

== Amateur career ==
Godfrey won the New Zealand Amateur in 1958 while only 16 years old. He remains the youngest winner of this tournament with current PGA Tour professional Danny Lee. Two years later, Godfrey represented New Zealand in the Eisenhower Trophy, playing with Bob Charles. Their team finished 5th out of 32 teams. Godfrey also participated at the 1962 Eisenhower Trophy, leading his team to a 4th-place finish. During this era he was also invited to play in amateur tournaments in South Africa but, because he is Maori, he decided not to travel, circumspect of how he would be treated in the apartheid country. As an amateur, he also finished runner-up in the 1962 New Zealand Open behind Kel Nagle.

== Professional career ==
In 1963, Godfrey turned professional. He sporadically played in Europe in his first year as a pro, participating in the 1963 Open Championship, but the weather did not appeal to him and he returned to New Zealand. The following year, he won his first important professional tournament, tying Frank Phillips at the West End Tournament in Victor Harbor, Australia. Godfrey missed a 3 1/2-foot putt on the 18th hole to win outright. The following year, he tied for second at the Metalcraft Tournament in his home country of New Zealand, three behind Australian legend Peter Thomson. During this era, he moved permanently to Australia.

In 1967, Godfrey scored his greatest successes. At the beginning of the 1967–68 season Godfrey nearly won again at the West End Tournament. Godfrey shot a course record 65 on Friday to get into contention and could have won if it were not for Kel Nagle's 64 – usurping Godfrey's own course record – on Sunday. Godfrey finished in a tie for second, three back of Nagle. Two months later, on 10 December, he entered the final round of the BP Tournament, held near his hometown in Auckland, New Zealand, tied with Peter Thomson. The two players alternated the lead several times down the stretch. On the 15th hole, Thomson missed a six-foot putt and Godfrey took the lead. However Thomson regained the solo lead two holes later. On the final hole, however, Thomson drove into the trees and made bogey while Godfrey birdied, exchanging the lead once more, giving the New Zealander the win. The following week he won the Metalcraft Tournament, held in Wellington. It was another dramatic win as Godfrey was tied for the lead entering the final hole. He hit a "magnificent" two-iron on the 516 yard, par-5 18th to five feet assuring his victory. He describes these victories as his greatest successes because he defeated legendary golfers Kel Nagle and Peter Thomson at both of them.

Godfrey's excellent play continued into 1968. In January, he nearly won again. He held the clubhouse lead at the New Zealand PGA Championship before Bob Shaw birdied the 72nd hole to win outright. The following month he recorded another runner-up finish, this time at the Tasmanian Open, albeit 17 strokes behind Randall Vines. In May 1968 he recorded another runner-up finish. Godfrey was tied for the lead with Peter Thomson after two rounds at the South Australian Open. They remained tied after the third round's front nine. Amidst poor weather, however, Godfrey lost "four valuable strokes" on the back nine and, against Thomson's even par performance, was four back entering the final round. Godfrey made a slight comeback at beginning of the third round. Against "wind and cold rain" it took him three wood shots to reach the par-5 second hole but he was able to birdie it. The lead was down to three and, Thomson wrote in The Age, "it looked like he might catch me." However, Godfrey made a number mistakes on the back nine again, ultimately shooting a 42 for a 79 (+6). He lost to Thomson by nine though still finished in solo second.

Godfrey had much success in 1971. In October, he won the West End Tournament again. His final total of 276 was only two off the course record and even more impressive given the "atrocious weather." He won by five shots. The following month, he won the Cumberland Classic in Sydney by one stroke over American Marty Bohen. Two weeks after that, on 28 November 1971, he finished third in the New Zealand Open. It was Godfrey's best finish in his national open since his amateur days.

Godfrey good play continued in 1972. In February he won the Victorian Open. Possessing a 3-shot lead over Kel Nagle on the 11th hole, Godfrey hit his drive into the trees. Rather than pitching out to the fairway he decided to gamble, hitting a 5-iron approach over a "menacingly low overhanging bough" towards the green. It worked out perfectly, as the ball stopped a foot from the cup for an easy birdie. Coupled with a bogey from Nagle, Godfrey built a 5-shot lead and cruised to a 7-shot win. He also had some success on the Asian circuit that fall. Early in 1972, he finished one behind Japan's Takashi Murakami at the Malaysian Open. In April, he finally won on the Asian circuit, winning the Hong Kong Open. Godfrey shot a final round 67 (−3) at the Fanling Golf Course to avenge his loss to Murakami, defeating Japanese star by two shots. It was his first win on the Asian circuit after eight years of effort. In October 1972 he nearly defended his West End title. Like the previous year, he shot a course record in the second round, this time being a seven-under par 63, tying Kel Nagle for the lead. Both players were neck and neck through the weekend but Nagle ultimately outshot Godfrey by three on Sunday to win.

In late 1973 he seriously contented at a number of tournaments. In September 1973 he had another chance to win the South Australian Open. Godfrey started the round six shots behind Ted Ball. However, in the "high winds and biting cold" Ball came back to the field. Godfrey shot a final round 71 (–1) to give himself a chance. However, Ball made a "magnificent" birdie on the 15th and got up and down from a bunker on the 16th. He defeated Godfrey by two. Godfrey finished in solo third, a shot behind runner-up Terry Kendall and five shots ahead of the remainder of the field. In October he was the 54-hole leader going into the final round of the North Coast Open. However, Stewart Ginn caught him with a birdie on the first hole. From thereafter, it was a struggle for Godfrey, especially on the greens, as he had 38 putts, including four three-putts. He shot several over par and finished eight strokes behind Ginn in solo sixth place at 287. In November he seriously competed once more, finishing only one behind Bob Charles at the 1973 City of Auckland Classic.

In January 1974, he had one more duel with Nagle, this time at the New Zealand PGA Championship. Godfrey came from behind to tie Nagle in the final round however he bogeyed the 18th hole while Nagle birdied it providing the deciding two shot differential. During this era, a young Steve Williams was briefly his caddie.

In 1977, Godfrey retired from working as a touring professional. Although he did not state it at the time, the major reason was because his eyesight was severely diminishing. He later stated, "I was just playing on memory, but by the end I couldn't judge hills or breaks on the greens. I got to the stage where I couldn't see [anything]." He took a job as a club professional at Subang National Golf Club in Kuala Lumpur, Malaysia. He worked there for five years. During this time he won an event held at Subang National, the 1979 Malaysian Dunlop Masters. In 1982 he returned to Australia and got a job at Fox Hills Golf Club in Sydney. He worked there for 10 years. In 1992 he left the golf industry permanently and bought a news agency that he owned until 2002.

In 2007 he had laser surgery performed on his eyes. The operations, however, have not been completely successful.

Godfrey estimates he has won well over 20 global tournaments.

== Personal life ==
As of 1971, he was married with a daughter and a son. He got remarried while living in Malaysia.

== Amateur wins ==
- 1958 New Zealand Amateur

== Professional wins (11) ==
=== Asia Golf Circuit win (1) ===
No.	Date	Tournament	Winning score	Margin of victory	Runner-up
1	2 Apr 1972	Hong Kong Open	−8 (66-71-68-67=272)	2 strokes	(Japan) Takashi Murakami

=== New Zealand Golf Circuit wins (2) ===
No.	Date	Tournament	Winning score	Margin of victory	Runner-up
1	9 Dec 1967	BP Tournament	−15 (66-68-69-70=273)	1 stroke	(Australia) Peter Thomson
2	16 Dec 1967	Metalcraft Tournament	−2 (75-70-69-68=282)	1 stroke	(Australia) Frank Phillips

=== Other wins (8) ===
- 1964 West End Tournament (tie with Frank Phillips)
- 1967 Spalding Masters, City of Sydney Open
- 1968 Wagga City Open
- 1971 West End Tournament, Cumberland Classic
- 1972 Victorian Open
- 1979 Malaysian Dunlop Masters

== Results in major championships ==
Tournament	1963	1964	1965	1966	1967	1968	1969	1970	1971	1972
The Open Championship	T36							T22	T40	CUT

Note: Godfrey only played in The Open Championship.

Did not play

CUT = missed the half-way cut
"T" indicates a tie for a place

== Team appearances ==
Amateur

- Eisenhower Trophy (representing New Zealand): 1960, 1962
- Sloan Morpeth Trophy (representing New Zealand): 1961 (winners)

Professional

- World Cup (representing New Zealand): 1967, 1968, 1972, 1975
