= Bill Dunk =

Australian professional golfer

Personal information
- Full name: William Edgar Dunk
- Nationality: Australia
- Born: 10 December 1938 (age 87)
- Height: 1.69 m (5 ft 7 in)
- Weight: 68 kg (150 lb; 10.7 st)

Career
- Sport: Golf
- Status: Professional
- Former tours: PGA of Japan Tour; Far East Circuit; PGA Tour of Australia; New Zealand Golf Circuit
- Professional wins: 51

Number of wins by tour
- Japan Golf Tour: 2
- PGA Tour of Australasia: 8
- Other: 41

Best results in major championships
- Masters Tournament: DNP
- PGA Championship: DNP
- U.S. Open: CUT: 1962, 1964
- The Open Championship: T35: 1981

Achievements and awards
- New Zealand Golf Circuit money list winner: 1972–73

William Edgar Dunk (born 10 December 1938) is an Australian professional golfer.

== Early life ==
Dunk is the son of a greenkeeper at Gosford Golf Club on the NSW Central Coast.

== Professional career ==
Dunk won five Australian PGA Championships. In addition, he won the New Zealand Open. He won over 100 tournaments and broke over 80 course records, more than any other golfer in Australia. In 1970, he led the world's scoring averages from Jack Nicklaus with 70.21 for 110 rounds.

In 1970, Dunk set an Australian lowest-score record of 10 under par 60 at Merewether in the NBN-3 Tournament. His course records include 61 at Maitland, NSW, 63 at Hastings New Zealand, 64 at Victoria Golf Club (9 birdies, 9 pars), then the lowest score ever played in the Australian Open - 64 in the Texas Open, 65 at Royal Selangor, 66 at Royal Sydney Golf Club and 66 at Kingston Heath Golf Club. In 1971, at Coffs Harbour he surged to 11 under after only 12 holes. He finished with 63, nine under par on the card. In a span of 30 months between 1967 and 1969, he won 25 tournaments and set 25 course records. Dunk also won the Malaysian Open and the New Zealand Open.

== Personal life ==
Dunk and his wife Annette have three children. He settled on the New South Wales central coast.

== Professional wins (51) ==
=== PGA of Japan Tour wins (2) ===
No.	Date	Tournament	Winning score	Margin of victory	Runner(s)-up
1	14 Sep 1975	Sanpo Classic	−15 (67-69-69-68=273)	2 strokes	(United States) Lon Hinkle
2	13 Jun 1976	Sapporo Tokyu Open	−10 (72-67-69-70=278)	2 strokes	(Taiwan) Hsieh Min-Nan, (Australia) Graham Marsh

=== Far East Circuit wins (1) ===
No.	Date	Tournament	Winning score	Margin of victory	Runners-up
1	3 Mar 1963	Malayan Open	−20 (66-71-74-65=276)	4 strokes	(Japan) Tadashi Kitta, (Taiwan) Hsieh Yung-yo

=== PGA Tour of Australia wins (8) ===
No.	Date	Tournament	Winning score	Margin of victory	Runner-up
1	23 Jun 1974	Queensland Open	+1 (74-76-69-70=289)	1 stroke	(Australia) John Sheargold
2	13 Oct 1974	Australian PGA Championship	−9 (73-68-68-70=279)	Playoff	(Australia) Ian Stanley
3	9 Nov 1975	Chrysler Classic	−3 (70-70-73-68=281)	1 stroke	(Australia) David Graham
4	18 Jan 1976	Australian PGA Championship (2)	−7 (68-70-72-71=281)	Playoff	(Australia) Peter Croker
5	13 Feb 1977	Tattersall's Tasmanian Open	−12 (67-67-70-68=272)	4 strokes	(Australia) Mike Cahill
6	19 Mar 1978	Illawarra Open	−5 (69-66=135) (Note: Shortened to 36 holes due to weather.)	1 stroke	(Australia) Colin McGregor
7	12 Oct 1980	Queensland Open (2)	−9 (69-69-71-70=279)	1 stroke	(New Zealand) Richard Coombes
8	15 Feb 1981	Victorian Open	−11 (69-74-67-67=277)	5 strokes	(Australia) Wayne Grady

PGA Tour of Australasia playoff record (2–2)

No.	Year	Tournament	Opponent	Result
1	1974	Australian PGA Championship	(Australia) Ian Stanley	Won 18 hole playoff; Dunk: −1 (71), Stanley: E (72)
2	1976	Australian PGA Championship	(Australia) Peter Croker	Won 18 hole playoff; Dunk: −1 (71), Croker: +3 (75)
3	1977	Forbes Classic	(Australia) Terry Gale	Lost to birdie on second extra hole
4	1977	New South Wales Open	(Australia) Trevor McDonald	Lost to birdie on second extra hole

=== Other Australian wins (22) ===
this list is incomplete

- 1960 New South Wales PGA
- 1962 Australian PGA Championship
- 1966 Australian PGA Championship, North Coast Open
- 1967 New South Wales Open, North Coast Open, Forbes Open
- 1968 New South Wales PGA
- 1969 New South Wales PGA, Brisbane Water Tournament
- 1970 New South Wales PGA, South Australian Open, North Coast Open, South Pacific Open
- 1971 Australian PGA Championship, New South Wales Open, North Coast Open, New South Wales PGA Foursomes Championship (with Graham Abbott)
- 1972 Queensland Open, Tasmanian Open
- 1973 Queensland Open
- 1975 Royal Fremantle Open

=== New Zealand Golf Circuit wins (7) ===
No.	Date	Tournament	Winning score	Margin of victory	Runner(s)-up
1	24 Nov 1964	Metalcraft Tournament	−14 (69-65-67-73=274)	5 strokes	(Australia) Kel Nagle
2	5 Dec 1964	Wiseman's Tournament	−13 (71-70-71-63=275)	3 strokes	(Australia) Len Thomas
3	8 Dec 1964	Wattie's Tournament	−6 (68-69-68-69=274)	Shared title with (South Africa) Cobie Legrange	
4	19 Dec 1964	BP Tournament	−16 (70-69-64-69=272)	4 strokes	(Australia) Kel Nagle, (Australia) Len Thomas
5	26 Nov 1972	New Zealand Open	−5 (70-70-71-68=279)	1 stroke	(England) Maurice Bembridge
6	10 Dec 1972	Caltex Tournament	−11 (71-69-68-65=273)	3 strokes	(Australia) Jack Newton
7	24 Nov 1975	New Zealand Open (2)	−16 (64-72-70-66=272)	4 strokes	(United States) Bill Brask, (United States) Bruce Fleisher

New Zealand Golf Circuit playoff record (0–2)

No.	Year	Tournament	Opponent(s)	Result
1	1969	Vonnel International	(New Zealand) Terry Kendall, (New Zealand) John Lister, (Australia) Randall Vines	Lister won with birdie on second extra hole Kendall and Vines eliminated by par on first hole
2	1977	Air New Zealand Shell Open	(Australia) David Good	Lost to par on first extra hole

=== Other New Zealand wins (1) ===
- 1968 Spalding Masters

=== Senior wins (10) ===
this list is incomplete

- 1989 Australian PGA Seniors Championship, New South Wales Seniors
- 1990 New South Wales Seniors, Mitsukoshi Seniors (Japan)
- 1991 JAS Cup Senior (Japan), Misawa Resort Senior Open (Japan), Ho-Oh Cup (Japan)
- 1995 Australian PGA Seniors Championship
- 1993 Mizuno Senior Classic (Japan), HTB Hokkaido Senior (Japan)

== Awards and honors ==
- Dunk was inducted as a life member of the PGA Tour of Australasia in 1996.

== Team appearances ==
- World Cup (representing Australia): 1968, 1969, 1972
