= Ted Ball =

Australian professional golfer

Personal information
- Full name: Edward A. Ball
- Nationality: Australia
- Born: 4 November 1939 Hornsby, New South Wales, Australia
- Died: 17 April 1995 (aged 55)
- Height: 1.74 m (5 ft 9 in)
- Weight: 73 kg (161 lb; 11.5 st)

Career
- Sport: Golf
- Status: Professional
- Former tours: PGA Tour; PGA Tour of Australasia
- Professional wins: 21

Number of wins by tour
- PGA Tour of Australasia: 4
- Other: 17

Best results in major championships
- Masters Tournament: DNP
- PGA Championship: DNP
- U.S. Open: DNP
- The Open Championship: CUT: 1964, 1975

Edward A. Ball (4 November 1939 – 17 April 1995) was an Australian professional golfer. He won several dozen significant tournaments in his career.

== Early life ==
Ball was born in Hornsby, New South Wales. He had a decorated amateur career, including a win at the Australian Amateur in 1960, along with several other victories.

== Professional career ==
Ball turned professional in the early 1960s and found immediate success. He won his first title in 1962 at the Queensland Open. He added numerous wins after that internationally. He staged one of Australian golf's greatest comebacks to win the Wills Masters in 1973. In 1974, he became the first player to successfully defend the Wills title. He shot rounds of 70, 69, 72 and 70 at The Australian Golf Club in Sydney to win by two strokes; this is said to be the greatest achievement in his career.

== Amateur wins ==
- 1960 Australian Amateur, New South Wales Champion of Champions, New South Wales Amateur

== Professional wins (21) ==
=== Asia Golf Circuit wins (2) ===
No.	Date	Tournament	Winning score	Margin of victory	Runner(s)-up
1	8 Mar 1964	Singapore Open	−1 (70-77-72-72=291)	1 stroke	(Australia) Eric Cremin, (Japan) Tadashi Kitta
2	30 Mar 1975	Indian Open	−10 (75-70-67-70=282)	Playoff	(Taiwan) Kuo Chie-Hsiung

Asia Golf Circuit playoff record (1–0)

No.	Year	Tournament	Opponent	Result
1	1975	Indian Open	(Taiwan) Kuo Chie-Hsiung	Won with birdie on first extra hole

=== PGA Tour of Australia wins (5) ===
No.	Date	Tournament	Winning score	Margin of victory	Runner(s)-up
1	30 Sep 1973	South Australian Open	−2 (72-66-73-75)	1 stroke	(New Zealand) Terry Kendall
2	21 Oct 1973	Wills Masters	−6 (71-71-72-68=282)	2 strokes	(United States) Jerry Heard
3	20 Oct 1974	New South Wales Open	−8 (70-71-70-69=280)	7 strokes	(Australia) Kel Nagle
4	27 Oct 1974	Wills Masters (2)	−6 (70-69-72-70=281)	2 strokes	(South Africa) Gary Player, (Australia) Ian Stanley
5	28 Sep 1980	National Panasonic New South Wales PGA Championship	−3 (67-70-76-72=285)	1 stroke	(Australia) Wayne Grady, (Australia) Lyndsay Stephen

PGA Tour of Australia playoff record (0–3)

No.	Year	Tournament	Opponent(s)	Result
1	1974	Coca-Cola Lakes Open	(Australia) Paul Murray, (Australia) Bob Shearer	Shearer won with birdie on first extra hole
2	1974	Tasmanian Open	(Australia) Bob Shearer	
3	1978	Joe Jansen New South Wales PGA Championship	(Australia) Mike Cahill, (Australia) John Clifford	Clifford won with birdie on first extra hole

=== New Zealand Golf Circuit wins (2) ===
No.	Date	Tournament	Winning score	Margin of victory	Runner(s)-up
1	3 Sep 1963	Metalcraft Tournament	−5 (72-69-74-72=287)	Shared title with (Australia) Peter Thomson	
2	12 Dec 1964	Wills Classic	−14 (63-71-64-68=266)	5 strokes	(Australia) Barry Coxon, (Australia) Bob Tuohy

=== Other Australian wins (11) ===
- 1962 Queensland Open
- 1964 Wagga City Open, City of Sydney Open, Tasmanian Open, New South Wales Open
- 1965 Lakes Open, Johnston Motors Tournament
- 1968 Queensland PGA Championship
- 1970 City of Sydney Open
- 1972 South Australian Open
- 1977 New South Wales PGA Championship

=== Other wins (1) ===
- 1977 Papua New Guinea Open

== Team appearances ==
Amateur

- Eisenhower Trophy (representing Australia): 1960
- Australian Men's Interstate Teams Matches (representing New South Wales): 1960 (winners)

Professional

- World Cup (representing Australia): 1974
