= New Zealand Golf Circuit =

Professional golf tour

- Sport: Golf
- Founded: 1963
- Founder: New Zealand Golf Association
- First season: 1963
- Folded: 1980
- Countries: Based in New Zealand
- Most titles: Money list titles: (New Zealand) Bob Charles (6); Tournament wins: (New Zealand) Bob Charles (20)
- Related competitions: Charles Tour; Golf Tour of New Zealand

The New Zealand Golf Circuit was an annual series of professional tournaments held in New Zealand between 1963 and early 1980.

== History ==
A small number of professional tournaments had been held in New Zealand before 1963, the Caltex Tournament had been held annually since 1955 and the Wiseman's Tournament had been held in 1952, 1955 and 1958. However it was not until 1963 that a formal "circuit" was organised. In its first season it was held in late August and September but from 1964 it was moved to a later date, generally starting in mid-November. Initially the New Zealand PGA Championship, was not included in the circuit but from 1968-69 it was added, together with the Spalding Masters, extending the circuit into January.

The circuit enjoyed considerable success for a number of years, but by 1979–80 it had been reduced to just three events. From 1980 the New Zealand events were incorporated into the PGA Tour of Australia schedule and a combined Order of Merit was produced.

== Money list winners ==
Season	Winner	Prize money (NZ$)
1979–80	(Australia) Rodger Davis	15,932
1978–79	(New Zealand) Bob Charles (6)	21,548
1977–78	(Australia) David Good	18,853
1976–77	(New Zealand) John Lister (2)	15,737
1975–76	(United States) Bill Brask	15,894
1974–75	(New Zealand) John Lister	12,075
1973–74	(New Zealand) Bob Charles (5)	10,100
1972–73	(Australia) Bill Dunk	7,759
1971–72	(New Zealand) Bob Charles (4)	10,588
1970–71	(Australia) Graham Marsh	8,400
1969–70	(Australia) Kel Nagle (2)	8,925
1968–69	(New Zealand) Bob Charles (3)	
1967	(New Zealand) Bob Charles (2)	3,040
Season	Winner	Prize money (£NZ)
1966	(New Zealand) Bob Charles	1,595
1965	(Australia) Peter Thomson	1,568
1964	(Australia) Kel Nagle	1,741
Season	Winner	Points
1963	(Australia) Bruce Devlin	55

=== Multiple winners ===
Rank	Player	Wins	Years won
1	(New Zealand) Bob Charles	6	1966, 1967, 1968–69, 1971–72, 1973–74, 1978–79
T2	(New Zealand) John Lister	2	1974–75, 1976–77
T2	(Australia) Kel Nagle	2	1964, 1969–70

== See also ==
- New Zealand Open
- Charles Tour
