= Kel Nagle =

Australian professional golfer (1920–2015)

Personal information
- Full name: Kelvin David George Nagle
- Nickname: The Pymble Crusher
- Nationality: Australia
- Born: 21 December 1920 North Sydney, Australia
- Died: 29 January 2015 (aged 94) Sydney, Australia
- Height: 5 ft 10.5 in (1.79 m)
- Weight: 190 lb (86 kg; 14 st)

Career
- Sport: Golf
- Turned professional: 1946
- Former tours: PGA Tour of Australasia; European Tour; Champions Tour
- Professional wins: 95

Number of wins by tour
- PGA Tour: 2
- PGA Tour of Australasia: 7
- Other: 86

Best results in major championships (wins: 1)
- Masters Tournament: T15: 1965
- PGA Championship: T20: 1965
- U.S. Open: 2nd: 1965
- The Open Championship: Won: 1960

Achievements and awards
- World Golf Hall of Fame: 2007 (member page)
- Far East Circuit Order of Merit winner: 1963
- New Zealand Golf Circuit money list winner: 1964, 1969–70

Kelvin David George Nagle AM (21 December 1920 – 29 January 2015) was an Australian professional golfer best known for winning The Open Championship in 1960. He won at least one tournament each year from 1949 to 1975.

== Early life ==
Nagle was born in North Sydney. Because of five-and-a-half years of World War II military service (1939–45), Nagle got a late start on pro golf, as he played no golf between ages 19 and 24, and turned pro at age 25 (1946). He made up for lost time by winning at least one tournament each year from 1949 to 1975.

== Professional career ==
During his early career, he had a long swing and was regarded as the longest hitter on the Australasia tour, as evidenced by the Australian press dubbing him as "the Pymble Crusher". By age 39 (in 1960, when he won The Open Championship), Nagle had shortened his swing and become a straight hitter with what Gary Player described as "the best short game out here".

Although he had won over 30 tournaments in Australia, and had won the Canada Cup for Australia in partnership with five-time Open champion Peter Thomson in 1954 and 1959, Nagle was a shock winner of The Open, as he was 39 years old but had never finished in the top-10 at a major championship before. Thomson told Nagle a few weeks prior to the 1960 Open championship that he "had the game" to win and that "you can beat me". He beat the rising star of American golf Arnold Palmer into second place, and it was Palmer who deprived him of his title in 1961.

Although he never regained The Open title, Kel Nagle had six top-five finishes at the Open between 1960 and 1966 (ages 39 to 45). His best result in a United States major was second in the 1965 U.S. Open—the year after he won the Canadian Open—when he and Gary Player finished the 72-hole tournament in a tie. Nagle lost to Player the next day in an 18-hole playoff, during which Nagle hit a female spectator in the forehead on the fifth hole and was visibly affected to the point that he hit another spectator on the same hole. Player won the playoff by 3 strokes.

As late as 1970, the year he turned 50, Nagle was ranked among the top ten players in the world on the McCormack's World Golf Rankings, the forerunner of the modern world ranking system. Nagle played on the Senior PGA Tour (now PGA Tour Champions) in the U.S. in the 1980s, when he was in his 60s and early 70s. His best finishes were a pair of T-3s: at the 1981 Eureka Federal Savings Classic and the 1982 Peter Jackson Champions. In July 2007, Nagle was elected to the World Golf Hall of Fame, and was inducted in November 2007.

== Death ==
Nagle died in Sydney on 29 January 2015 at the age of 94.

== Award and honors ==
- In 1980, he was awarded Member of the Order of Australia for the service to the sport of golf.
- In 1986, he was awarded Sport Australia Hall of Fame inductee.
- In 2001, Nagle was awarded Australian Sports Medal.
- In 2005, Kel Nagle Plate, presented annually to the best performing rookie in the Australian PGA Championship.
- In 2007, he was inducted into the World Golf Hall of Fame.

== Professional wins (95) ==
=== PGA Tour wins (2) ===
Legend
Major championships (1)
Other PGA Tour (1)

No.	Date	Tournament	Winning score	Margin of victory	Runner-up
1	9 Jul 1960	The Open Championship	−10 (69-67-71-71=278)	1 stroke	(United States) Arnold Palmer
2	2 Aug 1964	Canadian Open	−11 (73-71-66-67=277)	2 strokes	(United States) Arnold Palmer

PGA Tour playoff record (0–1)

No.	Year	Tournament	Opponent	Result
1	1965	U.S. Open	(South Africa) Gary Player	Lost 18-hole playoff; Player: +1 (71), Nagle: +4 (74)

=== PGA Tour of Australia wins (3) ===
No.	Date	Tournament	Winning score	Margin of victory	Runner(s)-up
1	22 Sep 1974	West End Tournament	−7 (70-70-68-73=281)	1 stroke	(Australia) Tom Linskey, (Australia) Rob McNaughton
2	16 Feb 1975	South Coast Open	−8 (72-67-68-69=276)	1 stroke	(Australia) Bob Shearer
3	10 Apr 1977	Western Australia PGA Championship	−5 (73-71-69-70=283)	1 stroke	(New Zealand) Barry Vivian

=== Other Australian wins (47) ===
- 1949 (1) Australian PGA Championship
- 1950 (1) WA Open
- 1951 (4) North Coast Open, New South Wales Close, WA Open, ACT Open
- 1952 (3) North Coast Open, WA Open, NSW PGA Championship
- 1953 (3) NSW PGA Championship, Adelaide Advertiser Tournament, McWilliam's Wines Tournament
- 1954 (5) Australian PGA Championship, North Coast Open, Lakes Open, ACT Open, Riverside and Tasmanian Tyre Services £500 Tournament
- 1955 (2) North Coast Open, NSW PGA Championship
- 1956 (1) NSW PGA Championship
- 1957 (2) New South Wales Close, Lakes Open
- 1958 (3) Australian PGA Championship, Lakes Open, Adelaide Advertiser Tournament
- 1959 (5) Australian Open, Australian PGA Championship, Queensland Open, NSW PGA Championship, Ampol Tournament (tie with Gary Player)
- 1962 (2) Victorian PGA Championship, Adelaide Advertiser Tournament
- 1963 (1) Lake Karrinyup Bowl
- 1964 (1) Queensland Open
- 1965 (2) Australian PGA Championship, NSW PGA Championship
- 1966 (2) Wills Masters, West End Tournament (tie with Murray Crafter),
- 1967 (2) Victorian Open, West End Tournament
- 1968 (3) New South Wales Open, Australian PGA Championship, West End Tournament
- 1969 (1) Victorian Open
- 1970 (1) NBN-3 Tournament
- 1971 (1) NSW PGA Championship
- 1972 (1) West End Tournament
- 1975 (1) Forbes Open

=== New Zealand Golf Circuit wins (19) ===
No.	Date	Tournament	Winning score	Margin of victory	Runner(s)-up
1	31 Aug 1963	Wiseman's Tournament	−7 (65-68-75-73=281)	2 strokes	(Australia) Ted Ball
2	21 Nov 1964	New Zealand Open	−26 (67-69-66-64=266)	12 strokes	(Australia) Frank Phillips
3	28 Nov 1964	Caltex Tournament	−7 (69-72-70-74=285)	1 stroke	(Australia) John Sullivan
4	4 Dec 1965	Forest Products Tournament	−19 (65-67-69-68=269)	1 stroke	(South Africa) Cedric Amm
5	11 Dec 1965	BP Tournament	−10 (69-72-73-74=278)	Shared title with (Australia) Peter Thomson	
6	3 Dec 1966	BP Tournament (2)	−12 (68-70-69-69=276)	3 strokes	(England) Clive Clark, (Netherlands) Martin Roesink
7	17 Dec 1966	Caltex Tournament (2)	−4 (71-69-68-68=276)	Shared title with (Australia) Peter Thomson	
8	18 Nov 1967	New Zealand Open (2)	−9 (70-64-70-71=275)	4 strokes	(Australia) Ted Ball
9	30 Nov 1968	New Zealand Open (3)	−8 (69-68-66-69=272)	7 strokes	(Australia) Frank Phillips
10	15 Dec 1968	BP Tournament (3)	−8 (64-69-69-70=272)	1 stroke	(New Zealand) Bob Charles, (England) Guy Wolstenholme
11	29 Nov 1969	New Zealand Open (4)	−7 (69-67-69-68=273)	2 strokes	(New Zealand) John Lister
12	7 Dec 1969	Garden City Classic	−20 (64-70-66-72=272)	2 strokes	(New Zealand) John Lister
13	13 Dec 1969	Caltex Tournament (3)	−9 (70-69-67-69=275)	7 strokes	(Australia) Bill Dunk, (New Zealand) John Lister
14	11 Jan 1970	Forest Products Stars Travel New Zealand PGA Championship	−24 (69-66-66-67=268)	3 strokes	(New Zealand) John Lister
15	13 Dec 1970	Otago Charity Classic	−16 (69-68-72-63=272)	2 strokes	(Australia) Vic Bennetts
16	7 Jan 1973	New Zealand PGA Championship (2)	−9 (66-73-70-66=275)	4 strokes	(New Zealand) John Carter
17	6 Jan 1974	New Zealand PGA Championship (3)	−16 (67-64-64-69=264)	2 strokes	(New Zealand) Walter Godfrey
18	5 Jan 1975	New Zealand PGA Championship (4)	−17 (65-67-65-70=267)	5 strokes	(Australia) Lindsay Sharp
19	28 Nov 1976	Otago Charity Classic (2)	−14 (66-69-66-63=274)	4 strokes	(New Zealand) Bob Charles

=== Other New Zealand wins (7) ===
- 1957 (2) New Zealand Open, New Zealand PGA Championship,
- 1958 (2) New Zealand Open, New Zealand PGA Championship
- 1960 (2) New Zealand PGA Championship, Caltex Tournament
- 1962 (1) New Zealand Open

=== European wins (11) ===
- 1960 Open Championship
- 1961 French Open, Swiss Open, Irish Hospitals Tournament, Dunlop Tournament
- 1962 Bowmaker Tournament, Carling-Lancastrian Tournament
- 1963 Esso Golden Tournament
- 1965 Bowmaker Tournament
- 1967 Esso Golden Tournament (tie with Peter Thomson)
- 1971 Volvo Open

=== Other wins (3) ===
- 1954 Canada Cup (with Peter Thomson)
- 1959 Canada Cup (with Peter Thomson)
- 1961 Hong Kong Open

=== Senior wins (5) ===
this list may be incomplete

- 1971 Pringle of Scotland Seniors Championship, World Senior Championship
- 1973 Pringle of Scotland Seniors Championship
- 1975 PGA Seniors Championship, World Senior Championship

== Major championships ==
=== Wins (1) ===
Year	Championship	54 holes	Winning score	Margin	Runner-up
1960	The Open Championship	2 shot lead	−10 (69-67-71-71=278)	1 stroke	(United States) Arnold Palmer

=== Results timeline ===
Tournament	1951	1952	1953	1954	1955	1956	1957	1958	1959
Masters Tournament									
U.S. Open									
The Open Championship	T19				T19				
PGA Championship									

Tournament	1960	1961	1962	1963	1964	1965	1966	1967	1968	1969
Masters Tournament	CUT	CUT	CUT	T35	T21	T15	CUT	T31	T30	
U.S. Open		T17		CUT	CUT	2	T34	T9	T52	CUT
The Open Championship	1	T5	2	4	45	T5	T4	T22	T13	9
PGA Championship						T20	CUT			

Tournament	1970	1971	1972	1973	1974	1975	1976	1977	1978	1979
Masters Tournament										
U.S. Open	T30									
The Open Championship	T32	T11	T31	T39	CUT	T40	CUT		CUT	
PGA Championship										

Tournament	1980	1981	1982	1983	1984
Masters Tournament					
U.S. Open					
The Open Championship					CUT
PGA Championship					

Win
Top 10
Did not play

CUT = missed the half-way cut (3rd round cut in 1974 Open Championship)
"T" = tied

=== Summary ===
Tournament	Wins	2nd	3rd	Top-5	Top-10	Top-25	Events	Cuts made
Masters Tournament	0	0	0	0	0	2	9	5
U.S. Open	0	1	0	1	2	3	9	6
The Open Championship	1	1	0	6	7	12	21	17
PGA Championship	0	0	0	0	0	1	2	1
Totals	1	2	0	7	9	18	41	29

- Most consecutive cuts made – 6 (twice)
- Longest streak of top-10s – 2 (1965 U.S. Open – 1965 Open Championship)

== Team appearances ==
- Canada Cup (representing Australia): 1954 (winners), 1955, 1958, 1959 (winners), 1960, 1961, 1962, 1965, 1966
- Lakes International Cup (representing Australia): 1952, 1954 (winners)
- Vicars Shield (representing New South Wales): 1948 (winners), 1949 (winners), 1950 (winners), 1951, 1952, 1953, 1954 (winners), 1955 (winners)

== See also ==
- List of men's major championships winning golfers
