= Malaysian Masters (disambiguation) =

Several sporting events have been titled as the Malaysian Masters or similar:

- Malaysia Masters, a badminton tournament held since 2009.
- Malaysian Dunlop Masters, a golf tournament held from 1974 to 1984.
- Malaysian Masters, a golf tournament held from 1988 to 1992, and an Australasian Tour event from 1991.
- Pulai Springs Malaysian Masters, an Asian Tour golf tournament held in 2006.
- Volvo Masters of Asia, an Asian Tour golf tournament held from 2002 to 2008, hosted in Malaysia in 2002 and 2004.
- Volvo Masters of Malaysia, a golf tournament held from 1994 to 2001, and an Asian Tour event from 1997.
