= 1976–77 New Zealand Golf Circuit =

Golf tour season

1976–77 New Zealand Golf Circuit season
- Duration: 11 November 1976 – 9 January 1977
- Number of official events: 7
- Most wins: (New Zealand) John Lister (3)
- Money list: (New Zealand) John Lister

The 1976–77 New Zealand Golf Circuit was the 14th season of the New Zealand Golf Circuit, the main professional golf tour in New Zealand since it was established in 1963.

== Schedule ==
The following table lists official events during the 1976–77 season.

Date	Tournament	Location	Purse (NZ$)	Winner (Note: The number in brackets after each winner's name is the number of New Zealand Golf Circuit events they had won up to and including that tournament. This information is only shown for New Zealand Golf Circuit members.)	Notes
14 Nov	Southland Charity Golf Classic	Southland	20,000	(Scotland) Bill Longmuir (n/a)	
21 Nov	New Zealand Airlines Classic	Canterbury	35,000	(Australia) Bob Shearer (1)	
28 Nov	Otago Charity Classic	Otago	25,000	(Australia) Kel Nagle (19)	
5 Dec	New Zealand Open	Wellington	25,000	(New Zealand) Simon Owen (1)	
12 Dec	City of Auckland Classic	Auckland	25,000	(New Zealand) John Lister (10)	
19 Dec	Meadowsfreight Waikato Charity Classic	Waikato	14,000	(New Zealand) John Lister (11)	New tournament
9 Jan	New Zealand PGA Championship	Bay of Plenty	20,000	(New Zealand) John Lister (12)	

== Money list ==
The money list was based on tournament results during the season, calculated in New Zealand dollars.

Position	Player	Prize money (NZ$)
1	(New Zealand) John Lister	15,737
2	(New Zealand) Bob Charles	9,413
3	(Australia) Kel Nagle	7,912
4	(United States) Bill Brask	7,502
5	(Australia) Bob Shearer	7,000
