= John Lister (golfer) =

New Zealand golfer

Personal information
- Full name: John Malcolm Lister
- Nationality: New Zealand
- Born: 9 March 1947 (age 79) Temuka, New Zealand

Career
- Sport: Golf
- Status: Professional
- Former tours: PGA Tour; New Zealand Golf Circuit
- Professional wins: 15

Number of wins by tour
- PGA Tour: 1
- Other: 14

Best results in major championships
- Masters Tournament: T42: 1971
- PGA Championship: T43: 1976
- U.S. Open: T27: 1977
- The Open Championship: T25: 1971

Achievements and awards
- New Zealand Golf Circuit money list winner: 1974–75, 1976–77

John Malcolm Lister (born 9 March 1947) is a professional golfer from New Zealand.

== Career ==
In 1947, Lister was born in Temuka, New Zealand. Lister's older brother, Tom Lister, was a professional rugby player and represented New Zealand internationally.

Lister was one of the leading players on the Australia and New Zealand circuits during the 1970s. Between 1972 and 1977, he was the leading player on the New Zealand golf circuit winning ten of twenty-five events. He won the Garden City Classic four consecutive times (1972–1975). His four consecutive wins in a professional tour event is a record that he shares with Tiger Woods, who won the Bay Hill Invitational from 2000 to 2003.

Lister also enjoyed success around the world. In 1970, he won twice on the British PGA circuit and finished the season in fourth place on the Order of Merit. At the end of the year he qualified for the PGA Tour. He played on the PGA Tour from 1971 until 1982, where he had 15 top-10 finishes in 12 seasons, including a win at the 1976 Ed McMahon-Jaycees Quad Cities Open, the first international player to win this tournament. His best finish in a major championship was in the 1971 Open Championship, where he tied for 25th place.

== Professional wins (15) ==
=== PGA Tour wins (1) ===
No.	Date	Tournament	Winning score	Margin of victory	Runner-up
1	11 Jul 1976	Ed McMahon-Jaycees Quad Cities Open	−16 (68-68-65-67=268)	2 strokes	(United States) Fuzzy Zoeller

=== British PGA circuit wins (2) ===
Date	Tournament	Winning score	Margin of victory	Runner-up	Ref.
1 Aug 1970	Piccadilly Medal	68-66=134	3 strokes	(England) Tommy Horton	
8 Aug 1970	Gallaher Ulster Open	64-65-65-70=264	3 strokes	(England) Tommy Horton	

=== New Zealand Golf Circuit wins (12) ===
No.	Date	Tournament	Winning score	Margin of victory	Runner(s)-up
1	21 Dec 1969	Vonnel International	−4 (70-70=140)	Playoff	(Australia) Bill Dunk, (New Zealand) Terry Kendall, (Australia) Randall Vines
2	9 Jan 1971	Forest Products Stars Travel New Zealand PGA Championship	−30 (65-66-65-66=262)	8 strokes	(Australia) Vic Bennetts, (Australia) Graham Marsh
3	3 Dec 1972	Garden City Classic	−12 (68-72-69-71=280)	1 stroke	(New Zealand) Bob Charles
4	2 Dec 1973	Otago Charity Classic	−10 (68-69-70-71=278)	5 strokes	(Australia) Robert Taylor
5	9 Dec 1973	Garden City Classic (2)	−15 (68-73-68-67=277)	1 stroke	(Australia) David Good, (Australia) Bob Shearer
6	1 Dec 1974	Otago Charity Classic (2)	−16 (69-68-67-68=272)	1 stroke	(Australia) Kel Nagle
7	8 Dec 1974	Garden City Classic (3)	−18 (69-74-65-66=274)	6 strokes	(Australia) Bob Shearer, (Australia) Ian Stanley
8	7 Dec 1975	Garden City Classic (4)	−9 (68-74-71-70=283)	3 strokes	(Australia) Stewart Ginn
9	4 Jan 1976	New Zealand PGA Championship (2)	−17 (66-65-67-65=263)	Playoff	(United States) Bill Brask
10	12 Dec 1976	City of Auckland Classic	−11 (64-73-68-68=273)	4 strokes	(Australia) Vaughan Somers
11	19 Dec 1976	Meadowsfreight Waikato Charity Classic	−17 (67-66-69-69=271)	7 strokes	(Australia) David Good
12	9 Jan 1977	New Zealand PGA Championship (3)	−10 (64-70-69-71=274)	1 stroke	(New Zealand) Bob Charles, (England) John Downie

New Zealand Golf Circuit playoff record (2–0)

No.	Year	Tournament	Opponent(s)	Result
1	1969	Vonnel International	(Australia) Bill Dunk, (New Zealand) Terry Kendall, (Australia) Randall Vines	Won with birdie on second extra hole Kendall and Vines eliminated by par on first hole
2	1976	New Zealand PGA Championship	(United States) Bill Brask	Won with par on second extra hole

== Playoff record ==
PGA Tour of Australia playoff record (0–1)

No.	Year	Tournament	Opponents	Result
1	1981	New Zealand PGA Championship	(New Zealand) Dennis Clark, (Australia) Brian Jones	Jones won with birdie on fourth extra hole Clark eliminated by par on second hole

== Results in major championships ==
Tournament	1970	1971	1972	1973	1974	1975	1976	1977	1978
Masters Tournament		T42						CUT	
U.S. Open		T37		T58				T27	
The Open Championship	CUT	T25	CUT						
PGA Championship							T43	T62	CUT

Did not play

CUT = missed the halfway cut
"T" indicates a tie for a place.

== Team appearances ==
- World Cup (representing New Zealand): 1969, 1970, 1971

== See also ==
- 1970 PGA Tour Qualifying School graduates
