= 1972–73 New Zealand Golf Circuit =

Golf tour season

1972–73 New Zealand Golf Circuit season
- Duration: 16 November 1972 – 7 January 1973
- Number of official events: 6
- Most wins: (Australia) Bill Dunk (2)
- Money list: (Australia) Bill Dunk

The 1972–73 New Zealand Golf Circuit was the 10th season of the New Zealand Golf Circuit, the main professional golf tour in New Zealand since it was established in 1963.

== Schedule ==
The following table lists official events during the 1972–73 season.

Date	Tournament	Location	Purse (NZ$)	Winner (Note: The number in brackets after each winner's name is the number of New Zealand Golf Circuit events they had won up to and including that tournament. This information is only shown for New Zealand Golf Circuit members.)	Notes
19 Nov	Otago Charity Classic	Otago	20,000	(United States) Johnny Miller (n/a)	
26 Nov	New Zealand Open	Wellington	15,000	(Australia) Bill Dunk (5)	
3 Dec	Garden City Classic	Canterbury	15,000	(New Zealand) John Lister (3)	
10 Dec	Caltex Tournament	Wellington	10,000	(Australia) Bill Dunk (6)	
17 Dec	City of Auckland Classic	Auckland	20,000	(Australia) Jack Newton (1)	
7 Jan	New Zealand PGA Championship	Bay of Plenty	13,000	(Australia) Kel Nagle (16)	

== Money list ==
The money list was based on tournament results during the season, calculated in New Zealand dollars.

Position	Player	Prize money (NZ$)
1	(Australia) Bill Dunk	7,759
2	(Australia) Jack Newton	7,450
3	(Australia) Kel Nagle	5,858
4	(New Zealand) John Lister	4,819
5	(New Zealand) Bob Charles	4,014
