= Garden City Classic =

Tournament information
- Location: Christchurch, New Zealand
- Established: 1969
- Course: Russley Golf Club
- Par: 73
- Tour: New Zealand Golf Circuit
- Format: Stroke play
- Prize fund: NZ$25,000
- Month played: December
- Final year: 1975

Tournament record score
- Aggregate: 269 Jerry Heard (1971)
- To par: −23 as above

Final champion
- (New Zealand) John Lister

Location map
- Location in New Zealand

The Garden City Classic was a golf tournament held in New Zealand from 1969 to 1975. The event was hosted by Russley Golf Club in Christchurch. Russley hosted the New Zealand Airlines Classic in 1976.

== History ==
The event was part of the New Zealand Golf Circuit. John Lister won the event in four successive years, from 1972 to 1975.

== Winners ==
Year	Winner	Score	To par	Margin of victory	Runner(s)-up	Ref.
1975	(New Zealand) John Lister (4)	283	−9	3 strokes	(Australia) Stewart Ginn	
1974	(New Zealand) John Lister (3)	274	−18	6 strokes	(Australia) Bob Shearer (Australia) Ian Stanley	
1973	(New Zealand) John Lister (2)	277	−15	1 stroke	(Australia) David Good (Australia) Bob Shearer	
1972	(New Zealand) John Lister	280	−12	1 stroke	(New Zealand) Bob Charles	
1971	(United States) Jerry Heard	269	−23	5 strokes	(New Zealand) Bob Charles	
1970	(Australia) Peter Harvey	281	−11	2 strokes	(New Zealand) Bob Charles (Australia) Bob Tuohy	
1969	(Australia) Kel Nagle	272	−20	2 strokes	(New Zealand) John Lister	
