= Yutaka Suzuki =

Japanese professional golfer

Yutaka Suzuki (1 July 1946) is a Japanese professional golfer.

== Professional career ==
Suzuki played most of his career on the Japan Golf Tour. However, his greatest successes came outside of his home country. Suzuki won the Singapore Open in 1975. In 1976, he won the Malaysian Dunlop Masters over American Hal Underwood and Malaysian Bobby Lim. He won the same event in 1977, held at Inhore Bahru in Malaysia.

In the 1980s, Suzuki continued to play in Japan, but with little success. His best finish during his later years was a T-4 at the 1988 Chubu Open.

== Professional wins (3) ==
=== Asia Golf Circuit wins (1) ===
No.	Date	Tournament	Winning score	Margin of victory	Runners-up
1	23 Mar 1975	Singapore Open	−4 (74-73-71-66=284)	1 stroke	(Taiwan) Hsieh Min-Nan, (Taiwan) Kuo Chie-Hsiung

=== Other wins (2) ===
- 1976 Malaysian Dunlop Masters
- 1977 Malaysian Dunlop Masters
