= Southland Charity Golf Classic =

Golf tournament

Tournament information
- Location: Invercargill, New Zealand
- Established: 1975
- Course: Invercargill Golf Club
- Par: 72
- Tour: New Zealand Golf Circuit
- Format: Stroke play
- Prize fund: NZ$20,000
- Month played: November
- Final year: 1976

Tournament record score
- Aggregate: 280 Bill Longmuir (1976)
- To par: −8 as above

Final champion
- (Scotland) Bill Longmuir

Location map
- Location in New Zealand

The Southland Charity Golf Classic was a professional golf tournament played at Invercargill Golf Club near Invercargill in South Island, New Zealand. It was played in 1975 and 1976. The 1976 event was played at the same time as the Colgate Champion of Champions in Australia.

== Winners ==
Year	Winner	Score	To par	Margin of victory	Runner-up	Ref.
1976	(Scotland) Bill Longmuir	280	−8	3 strokes	(United States) Pat McCleary	
1975	(United States) Bill Brask	284	−4	4 strokes	(Australia) Geoff Parslow	
