= 1975–76 New Zealand Golf Circuit =

Golf tour season

1975–76 New Zealand Golf Circuit season
- Duration: 13 November 1975 – 4 January 1976
- Number of official events: 6
- Most wins: (United States) Bill Brask (2) (New Zealand) John Lister (2)
- Money list: (United States) Bill Brask

The 1975–76 New Zealand Golf Circuit was the 13th season of the New Zealand Golf Circuit, the main professional golf tour in New Zealand since it was established in 1963.

== Schedule ==
The following table lists official events during the 1975–76 season.

| Date | Tournament | Location | Purse (NZ$) | Winner (Note: The number in brackets after each winner's name is the number of New Zealand Golf Circuit events they had won up to and including that tournament. This information is only shown for New Zealand Golf Circuit members.) | Notes |
|---|---|---|---|---|---|
| 16 Nov | New Zealand Airlines Classic | Auckland | 35,000 | (United States) Bill Brask (1) | New tournament |
| 24 Nov | New Zealand Open | Waikato | 20,000 | (Australia) Bill Dunk (7) | |
| 30 Nov | Otago Charity Classic | Otago | 25,000 | (United States) Hal Underwood (n/a) | |
| 7 Dec | Garden City Classic | Canterbury | 25,000 | (New Zealand) John Lister (8) | |
| 14 Dec | Southland Charity Golf Classic | Southland | 10,000 | (United States) Bill Brask (2) | New tournament |
| 4 Jan | New Zealand PGA Championship | Bay of Plenty | 20,000 | (New Zealand) John Lister (9) | |

== Money list ==
The money list was based on tournament results during the season, calculated in New Zealand dollars.

| Position | Player | Prize money (NZ$) |
|---|---|---|
| 1 | (United States) Bill Brask | 15,894 |
| 2 | (New Zealand) John Lister | 10,553 |
| 3 | (United States) Hal Underwood | 5,952 |
| 4 | (Australia) Brian Jones | 5,532 |
| 5 | (Australia) Bill Dunk | 4,480 |
