= 1969–70 New Zealand Golf Circuit =

Golf tour season

1969–70 New Zealand Golf Circuit season
- Duration: 27 November 1969 – 11 January 1970
- Number of official events: 7
- Most wins: (Australia) Kel Nagle (4)
- Money list: (Australia) Kel Nagle

The 1969–70 New Zealand Golf Circuit was the seventh season of the New Zealand Golf Circuit, the main professional golf tour in New Zealand since it was established in 1963.

== Schedule ==
The following table lists official events during the 1969–70 season.

Date	Tournament	Location	Purse (NZ$)	Winner (Note: The number in brackets after each winner's name is the number of New Zealand Golf Circuit events they had won up to and including that tournament. This information is only shown for New Zealand Golf Circuit members.)	Notes
29 Nov	New Zealand Open	Manawatu-Wanganui	12,500	(Australia) Kel Nagle (11)	
7 Dec	Garden City Classic	Canterbury	15,000	(Australia) Kel Nagle (12)	New tournament
13 Dec	Caltex Tournament	Wellington	5,000	(Australia) Kel Nagle (13)	
18 Dec	Wattie's Tournament	Gisborne	5,000	(Australia) Glenn McCully (1)	
21 Dec	Vonnel International	Auckland	5,000	(New Zealand) John Lister (1)	New tournament
5 Jan	Spalding Masters	Bay of Plenty	5,000	(New Zealand) Stuart Jones (a) (2)	
11 Jan	Forest Products Stars Travel New Zealand PGA Championship	Bay of Plenty	13,500	(Australia) Kel Nagle (14)	

== Money list ==
The money list was based on tournament results during the season, calculated in New Zealand dollars.

Position	Player	Prize money (NZ$)
1	(Australia) Kel Nagle	8,925
2	(New Zealand) John Lister	7,588
3	(Australia) Randall Vines	3,997
4	(Australia) Glenn McCully	2,586
5	(Australia) Bill Dunk	2,540
