= North Coast Open =

Golf tournament

The North Coast Open was a professional golf tournament in Australia from 1951 to 1975.

== History ==
It was always held at Coffs Harbour Golf Club in Coffs Harbour, New South Wales. It was a PGA Tour of Australia event from 1973 to 1975.

The name "North Coast Open" was not used until the 1953 championship, the first two events being referred to as Coffs Harbour Golf Club £200 Professional Purse. Initially the event was played over 36 holes, increasing to 54 holes in 1959, and 72 holes in 1962.

The 1974 event was the largest with 188 players; 119 professionals and 69 amateurs. It also had its highest hitherto purse at $A8,000.

== Winners ==
Year	Winner	Country	Score	To par	Margin of victory	Runner(s)-up	Ref
North Coast Open
1975	Vaughan Somers	Australia	279	−9	2 strokes	(Australia) Noel Ratcliffe	
1974	Allan Cooper	Australia	278	−10	5 strokes	(Australia) Rob McNaughton	
1973	Stewart Ginn	Australia	279	−9	5 strokes	(Australia) Tom Linskey	
1972	Terry Kendall	New Zealand	282	−6	1 stroke	(Australia) Bill Dunk	
1971	Bill Dunk (4)	Australia	269	−19	10 strokes	(Australia) Randall Vines	
1970	Bill Dunk (3)	Australia	212	−4	5 strokes	(Australia) Peter Harvey (Australia) Randall Vines	
1969	Tony Mangan	Australia	291	+3	3 strokes	(Australia) David Graham	
1968	Vic Bennetts	Australia	283	−5	2 strokes	(Australia) Les Wilson	
1967	Bill Dunk (2)	Australia	288	E	5 strokes	(Australia) Bob Swinbourne	
1966	Bill Dunk	Australia	276	−12	1 stroke	(Australia) Col Johnston	
1965	Norman Von Nida	Australia	284	−2	Playoff	(Australia) Jack Donald	
1964	Ron Howell	United States	278	−10	1 stroke	(Australia) Bill Dunk	
1963	Alan Murray	Australia	278	−10	4 strokes	(Australia) Col Johnston	
1962	Frank Phillips (2)	Australia	272	−16	8 strokes	(Australia) Stan Peach	
1961	Len Woodward	Australia	211	−5	2 strokes	(Canada) Stan Leonard	
North Coast Open Championship and Ampol Purse
1960	Frank Phillips	Australia	211	−5	1 stroke	(Australia) Peter Thomson	
1959	John Sullivan	Australia	212	+2	1 stroke	(Australia) Frank Phillips (Australia) Les Wilson	
1958	Bruce Crampton	Australia	138	−2	2 strokes	(Australia) Eric Cremin (Australia) Frank Phillips (Australia) Darrell Welch	
1957	Gary Player (2)	South Africa	135	−5	1 stroke	(Australia) Eric Cremin	
1956	Gary Player	South Africa	136	−4	Playoff	(Australia) Norm Berwick	
North Coast Open Championship
1955	Kel Nagle (4)	Australia	138		6 strokes	(Australia) Eric Cremin (Australia) Jim McInnes	
1954	Kel Nagle (3)	Australia	136		4 strokes	(Australia) Frank Phillips	
1953	Allan Myers	Australia	135		1 stroke	(Australia) Eric Cremin	
Coffs Harbour Professional Purse
1952	Kel Nagle (2)	Australia	141		1 stroke	(Australia) Jim McInnes	
1951	Kel Nagle	Australia	134		5 strokes	(Australia) Eric Cremin	

The 1970 event was reduced to 54 holes by bad weather. In 1956 Player beat Berwick in a playoff for the championship but they were tied when determining the prize money.
