= Waikato Charity Classic =

Meadowsfreight Waikato Charity Classic
Tournament information
- Location: Hamilton, New Zealand
- Established: 1976
- Course: Lochiel course
- Par: 72
- Tour: New Zealand Golf Circuit
- Format: Stroke play
- Prize fund: NZ$14,000
- Month played: December
- Final year: 1976

Tournament record score
- Aggregate: 271 John Lister (1976)
- To par: −17 as above

Final champion
- (New Zealand) John Lister

Location map
- Location in New Zealand

The Waikato Charity Classic was a golf tournament held in New Zealand in 1976. The event was played on the Lochiel course near Hamilton, New Zealand. John Lister won the event by 7 strokes. The event was part of the New Zealand Golf Circuit.

== Winners ==
Year	Winner	Score	To par	Margin of victory	Runner-up	Ref.
Meadowsfreight Waikato Charity Classic
1976	(New Zealand) John Lister	271	−17	7 strokes	(Australia) David Good	
