= Malaysian Masters =

Dunhill Malaysian Masters
Tournament information
- Location: Kuala Lumpur, Malaysia
- Established: 1988
- Course: Royal Selangor Golf Club
- Par: 72
- Tour: PGA Tour of Australasia
- Format: Stroke play
- Prize fund: US$320,000
- Month played: October
- Final year: 1992

Tournament record score
- Aggregate: 268 Frankie Miñoza (1989)
- To par: −20 as above

Final champion
- (Australia) Stewart Ginn

Location map
- Location in Malaysia

The Malaysian Masters was a golf tournament that was held in Malaysia from 1988 until 1992. In 1991 and 1992, it was part of the PGA Tour of Australasia schedule as the tour sought to expand into Southeast Asia, and as a result carried world ranking points in those years.

The tournament was founded in 1988 and had the richest purse in the region for an event outside of the Asia Golf Circuit, with hopes that it would become one of the biggest tournaments in Asia. In 1993, having been part of the Australasian Tour for two seasons, the tournament was cancelled as the tour worked towards closer ties with the Asia Golf Circuit.

== Winners ==
Year	Tour (Note: ANZ − PGA Tour of Australasia.)	Winner	Score	To par	Margin of victory	Runner(s)-up	Ref.
Dunhill Malaysian Masters
1993	ANZ	Cancelled					
1992	ANZ	(Australia) Terry Price	277	−11	2 strokes	(Australia) Anthony Gilligan (Taiwan) Hsieh Yu-shu	
Rothmans Malaysian Masters
1991	ANZ	(Australia) Stewart Ginn	278	−10	3 strokes	(Sri Lanka) Nandasena Perera	
1990		(Philippines) Frankie Miñoza (2)	278	−10	1 stroke	(United States) Michael Blewett	
1989		(Philippines) Frankie Miñoza	268	−20	8 strokes	(Malaysia) Sufian Tan	
Fairway Malaysian Masters
1988		(Taiwan) Chen Liang-hsi	279	−9	2 strokes	(Myanmar) Kyi Hla Han (Philippines) Frankie Miñoza	

== See also ==
- Malaysian Dunlop Masters
- Pulai Springs Malaysian Masters
- Volvo Masters of Malaysia
