= Pulai Springs Malaysian Masters =

Tournament information
- Location: Johor Bahru, Malaysia
- Established: 2006
- Course: Pulai Springs Resort
- Par: 72
- Length: 6,906 yards (6,315 m)
- Tour: Asian Tour
- Format: Stroke play
- Prize fund: US$300,000
- Month played: August/September
- Final year: 2006

Tournament record score
- Aggregate: 266 Anton Haig (2006)
- To par: −22 as above

Final champion
- (South Africa) Anton Haig

Location map
- Location in Malaysia

The Pulai Springs Malaysian Masters was a golf tournament on the Asian Tour that was held at the Pulai Springs Resort in Johor, Malaysia. It was played only once, in 2006, and was won by South African Anton Haig. The tournament was scheduled to return in 2007, but it was later removed from the tour schedule.

== Winners ==
Year	Winner	Score	To par	Margin of victory	Runner-up	Ref.
2006	(South Africa) Anton Haig	266	−22	1 stroke	(Scotland) Barry Hume	

== See also ==
- Malaysian Dunlop Masters
- Malaysian Masters
- Volvo Masters of Malaysia
