= Otago Charity Classic =

Tournament information
- Location: St Clair, New Zealand
- Established: 1970
- Course: St Clair Golf Club
- Par: 72
- Tour: New Zealand Golf Circuit
- Format: Stroke play
- Prize fund: NZ$40,000
- Month played: November
- Final year: 1978

Tournament record score
- Aggregate: 271 Seve Ballesteros (1977)
- To par: −17 as above

Final champion
- (United States) Mike Krantz

Location map
- Location in New Zealand

The Otago Charity Classic was a golf tournament held in New Zealand from 1970 to 1978. The event was hosted by St Clair Golf Club in Dunedin.

== History ==
The event was part of the New Zealand Golf Circuit. John Lister won the event in successive years, 1973 and 1974. Kel Nagle also won the tournament twice, in 1970 and 1976. Gaylord Burrows won A$9,200 for a hole-in-one in the final event in 1978.

== Winners ==
| Year | Winner | Score | To par | Margin of victory | Runner-up | Ref. |
|---|---|---|---|---|---|---|
| 1978 | (United States) Mike Krantz | 278 | −10 | 3 strokes | (Australia) Rodger Davis | |
| 1977 | (Spain) Seve Ballesteros | 271 | −17 | 3 strokes | (United States) Bob Byman | |
| 1976 | (Australia) Kel Nagle (2) | 274 | −14 | 4 strokes | (New Zealand) Bob Charles | |
| 1975 | (United States) Hal Underwood | 282 | −6 | Playoff | (United States) Bob Clark | |
| 1974 | (New Zealand) John Lister (2) | 272 | −16 | 1 stroke | (Australia) Kel Nagle | |
| 1973 | (New Zealand) John Lister | 278 | −10 | 5 strokes | (Australia) Robert Taylor | |
| 1972 | (United States) Johnny Miller | 281 | −7 | Playoff | (Taiwan) Lu Liang-Huan | |
| 1971 | (New Zealand) Bob Charles | 273 | −15 | 6 strokes | (United States) Marty Bohen | |
| 1970 | (Australia) Kel Nagle | 272 | −16 | 2 strokes | (Australia) Vic Bennetts | |
