= Forbes Open =

Australian golf tournament

Tournament information
- Location: Forbes, New South Wales, Australia
- Established: 1967
- Course: Forbes Golf Club
- Par: 72
- Tour: PGA Tour of Australia (1976–1977)
- Format: Stroke play
- Month played: February or March
- Final year: 1977

Tournament record score
- Aggregate: 279 Allan Cooper (1976)
- To par: −9 Allan Cooper (1976)

Final champion
- (Australia) Terry Gale

The Forbes Open, or Forbes Classic, was an Australian golf tournament. The event was founded in 1967 by Forbes Golf Club. The inaugural event attracted a strong field, led by legend Kel Nagle, as veteran Bill Dunk defeated Alan Murray by a stroke. In the early 1970s, the tournament evolved into a 54-hole event which included victories by golfers like Nagle and Jack Newton. Later in the decade the Forbes Open was upgraded into a full 72-hole tournament, earning the sanction of the PGA Tour of Australia. The event punctuated the "Golden Era" of the Forbes Golf Club of the mid-late 20th century.

== History ==
In early February 1967, the Forbes Golf Club, located in Forbes, New South Wales, made an announcement that they would be hosting their "first professional purse tournament." The purse was A$1,500. The tournament would open with a pro-am followed by the professional tournament. Over 90 "top golfers from New South Wales and overseas" committed the event. This included golfers from the state like Bob Stanton, Bill Dunk, and Ted Ball. Top Australian Kel Nagle also committed. In addition, overseas players like Martin Roesink, Andreas van Pixton, and Walter Godfrey elected to play. At the inaugural event Alan Murray "had the tournament within his grasp several times" over the course of the weekend but was unable to create separation. During the first round, he was two-under-par entering the final hole, leading the tournament, but "sliced his drive." He made double bogey to fall into second place. In the final round, Murray again was in the lead for much of the day. However, he once more "slumped" on the final hole. Bill Dunk took advantage, playing with "grim determination" to defeat Murray by one. Nearly 2,000 people attended the event.

In the early 1970s, there were significant advances to the event. A women's, "associates" tournament was played concurrent with the men's tournament. In addition, the men's event evolved into a 54-hole tournament. In 1971, Maria Parsons won the women's tournament by three strokes over Jan Stephenson and Heather Bleek. Alan Murray was able to win the men's event that year, by four strokes over a number of players. 4,000 spectators attended the event. The following year, Jack Newton shot a final round 69 to win at 213. It was the future star's "[b]iggest win" of his career to this point. The next year, in 1973, Penny Pulz, a future LPGA golfer, won the associate's tournament. At the men's tournament, Paul Firmstone took early control. In the opening round he shot a 69 (−3) to take the lead. In the second round, he "held his lead" with a one-under-par 71. He led by one over Bill Dunk, Brian Moran, and Tim Woolbank. Firmstone played poorly in the final round, however, ultimately shooting a 77 (+5) to fall out of the picture. It turned out to be a two-man race between Dunk and Woolbank. Both shot 35 on the front nine and held the joint lead at the turn. However, Dunk bogeyed the 10th and Woolbank eagled the par-5 11th; at this point "it was no longer a race." Woolbank defeated Dunk by four. The following year, Firmstone again contended. He was well behind Kel Nagle entering the final round; however, he shot several under-par to match Nagle by the end of regulation. However, he once again struggled in crunch time, losing to Nagle in the sudden-death playoff.

By the mid-1970s, the tournament had evolved into a full 72-hole event. The purse increased to A$10,000. At the 1976 tournament, after three rounds, Randall Vines had the lead with a 208 total. In the final round, however, Allan Cooper ascended into contention, birdieing four of the first six holes. Vines still "shared the lead" for most of the day "until he three-putted the 17th hole." Cooper, with a final round 67 (−5), defeated Vines by one. The following year, in the third round, Bill Dunk recorded a 66 in the third round, tying the course record. He held a two stroke lead over Kel Garner and led by one more over Tom Linksey, Terry Gale, and Barry Burgess. In the final round, however, Dunk "slumped" to a one-over-par 73. Gale, meanwhile, shot a two-under-par 70 to tie him. In the playoff, on the second extra hole, Gale made a "curling" birdie putt of 12 feet to win.

== Winners ==
Year	Winner	Score	To par	Margin of victory	Runner(s)-up	Purse	Ref.
Amoco Forbes Open
1967	Bill Dunk	145	+1	1 stroke	Alan Murray; Paul Hart	A$1,500	
1968							
1969	Tony Mangan	139	−5	2 strokes	John Sullivan	A$3,500	
1970	Barry Coxon	143	−1	Playoff	Rick L'Estrange	A$4,000	
1971	Alan Murray	208	−8	4 strokes	Jeff Watts; Jesse Vaughn; Lindsay Sharpe; Peter Jackson	A$5,000	
Amoco Forbes Golf Classic
1972	Jack Newton	213	−3	1 stroke	Bill Dunk; Paul Murray	A$5,000	
1973	Tim Woolbank	210	−6	4 strokes	Bill Dunk; Randall Vines	A$2,700	
Forbes Classic
1974							
1975	Kel Nagle	211	−5	Playoff	Paul Firmstone		
1976	Allan Cooper	279	−9	1 stroke	Randall Vines; Paul Murray	A$10,000	
1977	Terry Gale	285	−3	Playoff	Bill Dunk	A$15,000	
