= City of Auckland Classic =

Golf tournament held in New Zealand

Tournament information
- Location: Auckland, New Zealand
- Established: 1971
- Course: The Grange Golf Club
- Par: 71
- Tour: New Zealand Golf Circuit
- Format: Stroke play
- Prize fund: NZ$25,000
- Month played: December
- Final year: 1976

Tournament record score
- Aggregate: 268 Tom Kite (1974)
- To par: −16 as above

Final champion
- (New Zealand) John Lister

Location map
- Location in New Zealand

The City of Auckland Classic was a golf tournament held in New Zealand from 1971 to 1976.

== History ==
The tournament was part of the New Zealand Golf Circuit. The event was hosted by The Grange Golf Club in Auckland. In 1975, however, the New Zealand Airlines Classic was played at The Grange and the City of Auckland Classic was not held that year.

== Winners ==
Year	Winner	Score	To par	Margin of victory	Runner-up	Ref.
1976	(New Zealand) John Lister	273	−11	4 strokes	(Australia) Vaughan Somers	
1975: No tournament
1974	(United States) Tom Kite	268	−16	7 strokes	(Australia) Stewart Ginn	
1973	(New Zealand) Bob Charles	206 (Note: Shortened to 54 holes due to rain.)	−7	1 stroke	(New Zealand) Walter Godfrey	
1972	(Australia) Jack Newton	277	−7	1 stroke	(Australia) Bob Tuohy	
1971	(England) Guy Wolstenholme	275	−9	3 strokes	(Australia) Frank Phillips	
