= Jack Newton =

Australian professional golfer (1950–2022)

Personal information
- Nationality: Australia
- Born: 30 January 1950 Cessnock, New South Wales, Australia
- Died: 14 April 2022 (aged 72)
- Spouse: Jackie
- Children: 2

Career
- Sport: Golf
- Turned professional: 1969
- Former tours: PGA Tour of Australasia; European Tour; PGA Tour
- Professional wins: 13

Number of wins by tour
- PGA Tour: 1
- European Tour: 3
- PGA Tour of Australasia: 3
- Other: 6

Best results in major championships
- Masters Tournament: T2: 1980
- PGA Championship: T20: 1980
- U.S. Open: T32: 1980
- The Open Championship: 2nd: 1975

Achievements and awards
- PGA Tour of Australia Order of Merit winner: 1979

Jack Newton OAM (30 January 1950 – 14 April 2022) was an Australian professional golfer. Newton had early success in Australia, winning the 1972 Amoco Forbes Classic. He soon moved on to the British PGA where he won three times and finished runner-up at the 1975 Open Championship. Shortly thereafter, Newton started playing on the PGA Tour where he won one event, the 1978 Buick-Goodwrench Open. During the era, Newton still played extensively in his home country culminating with a win at the 1979 Australian Open. Four years later, in 1983, Newton had a near-fatal accident when he accidentally walked into the spinning propeller of an aeroplane, losing his right arm and right eye. Despite the tragedy Newton managed to survive and, though unable to continue as a professional golfer, was able to work a number of golf-related jobs for the remainder of his life.

== Career ==
In 1950, Newton was born in Cessnock, New South Wales.

In 1969, he turned professional. He was one of Australia's most successful golfers in the 1970s and early 1980s. In 1972, he won the Dutch Open and the Benson & Hedges Festival of Golf in successive weeks. In 1974, he won the Benson & Hedges Match Play Championship, beating Cesar Sanudo in the final. Later in 1974, he lost in a playoff for the New Zealand Open. In 1978, Newton won the Buick-Goodwrench Open on the PGA Tour. In Australia, he won the New South Wales Open in 1976 and 1979 and the Australian Open Championship in 1979.

At the 1975 Open Championship at Carnoustie in Scotland, Newton lost in a playoff to Tom Watson. In the third round, Newton set a course record of 65, despite having injured an ankle so severely on the practice tee prior to the start of the championship, that he had it professionally wrapped each day, and was subjected to pain-killing injections. In the final round, Newton was the leader during the back-nine but dropped shots in three of the last four holes. Watson holed a 20-foot putt for a birdie on the 72nd hole to tie Newton. In the 18-hole playoff on the following day, Watson defeated Newton by one stroke (71−72). Newton later said that the turning point in the playoff was when Watson chipped in for an eagle at the 14th hole.

Newton won the PGA Tour of Australia's Order of Merit in 1979. He finished tied for second at the 1980 Masters Tournament, four strokes behind the winner Seve Ballesteros. In May 1983, Newton lost to Terry Gale in a playoff for the Western Australian Open.

=== Propeller accident ===
On 24 July 1983, during the height of his professional career, Newton had a near-fatal accident when he walked into the spinning propeller of a Cessna aeroplane from which he was getting off at Sydney Airport. He lost his right arm and eye, and sustained severe abdominal injuries. A severe rainstorm was in progress at the time, and in addition, safety aspects near the plane were deficient.

The Bureau of Air Safety Investigation summary of the accident reads:

When two passengers had not arrived at the aircraft by a pre-arranged time, the pilot commenced to taxi for departure. After the aircraft had travelled a short distance, one of the missing passengers approached the right hand door. The pilot stopped the aircraft, and shortly afterwards the other passenger was seen moving along the left side of the aircraft towards the nose. The pilot shouted a warning and moved to shut down the engine, but the passenger was struck by the propeller.

Immediately after the accident, doctors gave Newton a 50–50 chance of surviving. He spent several days in a coma and eight weeks in intensive care. After a prolonged rehabilitation from his injuries, Newton returned to public life as a television and radio golf commentator, newspaper reporter, golf course designer, public speaker and chairman of the Jack Newton Junior Golf Foundation. He taught himself to play golf one-handed, swinging the club with his left hand in a right-handed stance. He typically scored in the mid-80s.

== Personal life ==
Newton married his wife Jackie in 1974; they had two children, Kristie and Clint. Clint Newton played rugby league, while Kristie is also a professional golfer. In 2003, Newton was diagnosed with meningococcal meningitis, and was rushed to hospital.

He died on 14 April 2022 at the age of 72 due to health complications, after being diagnosed with Alzheimer's disease in 2020.

== Awards and honors ==
- In 1973, the New South Wales PGA bestowed upon him its Most Improved Golfer Award.
- In 1979, Newton earned the PGA Tour of Australia's Order of Merit.
- In 2007, he was awarded the Medal of the Order of Australia for services to golf, particularly through a range of executive, youth development, and fundraising roles.
- In 2016, Newton was inducted as a general member of the Sport Australia Hall of Fame.

== Amateur wins ==
This list may be incomplete

- 1968 New South Wales Amateur
- 1969 Lake Macquarie Amateur

== Professional wins (13) ==
=== PGA Tour wins (1) ===
No.	Date	Tournament	Winning score	Margin of victory	Runner-up
1	18 Jun 1978	Buick-Goodwrench Open	−8 (72-67-70-71=280)	Playoff	(United States) Mike Sullivan

PGA Tour playoff record (1–1)

No.	Year	Tournament	Opponent	Result
1	1975	The Open Championship	(United States) Tom Watson	Lost 18-hole playoff; Watson: −1 (71), Newton: E (72)
2	1978	Buick-Goodwrench Open	(United States) Mike Sullivan	Won with birdie on first extra hole

=== European Tour wins (3) ===
No.	Date	Tournament	Winning score	Margin of victory	Runner(s)-up
1	13 Aug 1972	Dutch Open	−11 (64-75-69-69=277)	1 stroke	(England) Malcolm Gregson, (England) Peter Oosterhuis
2	19 Aug 1972	Benson & Hedges Festival of Golf	−3 (73-70-67-71=281)	1 stroke	(Scotland) Harry Bannerman
3	15 Sep 1974	Benson & Hedges Match Play Championship	2 and 1		(Mexico) Cesar Sanudo

European Tour playoff record (0–1)

No.	Year	Tournament	Opponent	Result
1	1975	The Open Championship	(United States) Tom Watson	Lost 18-hole playoff; Watson: −1 (71), Newton: E (72)

=== PGA Tour of Australia wins (3) ===
No.	Date	Tournament	Winning score	Margin of victory	Runners-up
1	17 Oct 1976	New South Wales Open	−19 (67-68-68-66=269)	10 strokes	(Australia) Ted Ball, (Australia) David Good
2	4 Nov 1979	New South Wales Open (2)	−11 (69-70-70-72=281)	9 strokes	(Australia) Wayne Grady, (England) Jeff Hall, (United States) Gary Vanier
3	18 Nov 1979	Dunhill Australian Open	E (74-72-70-72=288)	1 stroke	(Australia) Graham Marsh, (Australia) Greg Norman

PGA Tour of Australia playoff record (0–1)

No.	Year	Tournament	Opponent	Result
1	1983	Town and Country Western Australian Open	(Australia) Terry Gale	Lost to birdie on first extra hole

=== New Zealand Golf Circuit wins (1) ===
No.	Date	Tournament	Winning score	Margin of victory	Runner-up
1	17 Dec 1972	City of Auckland Classic	−7 (75-71-67-64=277)	1 stroke	(Australia) Bob Tuohy

New Zealand Golf Circuit playoff record (0–1)

No.	Year	Tournament	Opponent	Result
1	1974	New Zealand Open	(New Zealand) Bob Charles, (United States) Bob Gilder	Gilder won with birdie on third extra hole Newton eliminated by par on second hole

=== Other wins (5) ===
This list may be incomplete

- 1972 Amoco Forbes Classic
- 1974 Nigerian Open
- 1975 Sumrie-Bournemouth Better-Ball (with John O'Leary)
- 1976 Cock of the North, Mufulira Open

== Results in major championships ==
Tournament	1971	1972	1973	1974	1975	1976	1977	1978	1979	1980	1981
Masters Tournament						CUT	CUT		T12	T2	CUT
U.S. Open										T32	
The Open Championship	T49	T40	CUT	CUT	2	T17	CUT	T24	T57	T10	
PGA Championship								T50		T20	

Top 10
Did not play

CUT = missed the half-way cut (3rd round cut in 1973 and 1974 Open Championships)
"T" indicates a tie for a place

=== Summary ===
Tournament	Wins	2nd	3rd	Top-5	Top-10	Top-25	Events	Cuts made
Masters Tournament	0	1	0	1	1	2	5	2
U.S. Open	0	0	0	0	0	0	1	1
The Open Championship	0	1	0	1	2	4	10	7
PGA Championship	0	0	0	0	0	1	2	2
Totals	0	2	0	2	3	7	18	12

== Team appearances ==
Amateur

- Sloan Morpeth Trophy (representing Australia): 1969 (winners)
- Australian Men's Interstate Teams Matches (representing New South Wales): 1968, 1969 (winners)

== See also ==
- Fall 1976 PGA Tour Qualifying School graduates
