= 1993 Senior British Open =

Tournament information
- Dates: 22–25 July 1993
- Location: Lytham St Annes, England, United Kingdom; 53.7496°N 3.0178°W
- Course: Royal Lytham & St Annes Golf Club
- Organised by: The R&A
- Tours: European Seniors Tour; Senior PGA Tour
- Format: 72 holes stroke play

Statistics
- Par: 71
- Field: 123 players, 66 after cut
- Cut: 155 (+13)
- Prize fund: €220,000
- Winner's share: €51,310

Champion
- (New Zealand) Bob Charles (golfer)
- 291 (+7)
- Location in Europe Location in the United Kingdom Location in England Location in the Borough of Fylde Location in Lytham St Annes

The 1993 Senior British Open was a professional golf tournament for players aged 50 and above and the seventh Senior British Open, held from 22 to 25 July at Royal Lytham & St Annes Golf Club in Lytham St Annes, Lancashire, England, United Kingdom.

In 2018, the tournament was, as all Senior British Open Championships played 1987–2002, retroactively recognized as a senior major golf championship and a PGA Tour Champions (at the time named the Senior PGA Tour) event.

Bob Charles, with a birdie on the last hole, won by one stroke over Tommy Horton and Gary Player, to win his second Senior British Open title and second senior major championship. Charles won The Open Championship on the same course 30 years earlier, in 1963.

== Venue ==
The event was the third Senior Open Championship in a row held at Royal Lytham & St Annes Golf Club.

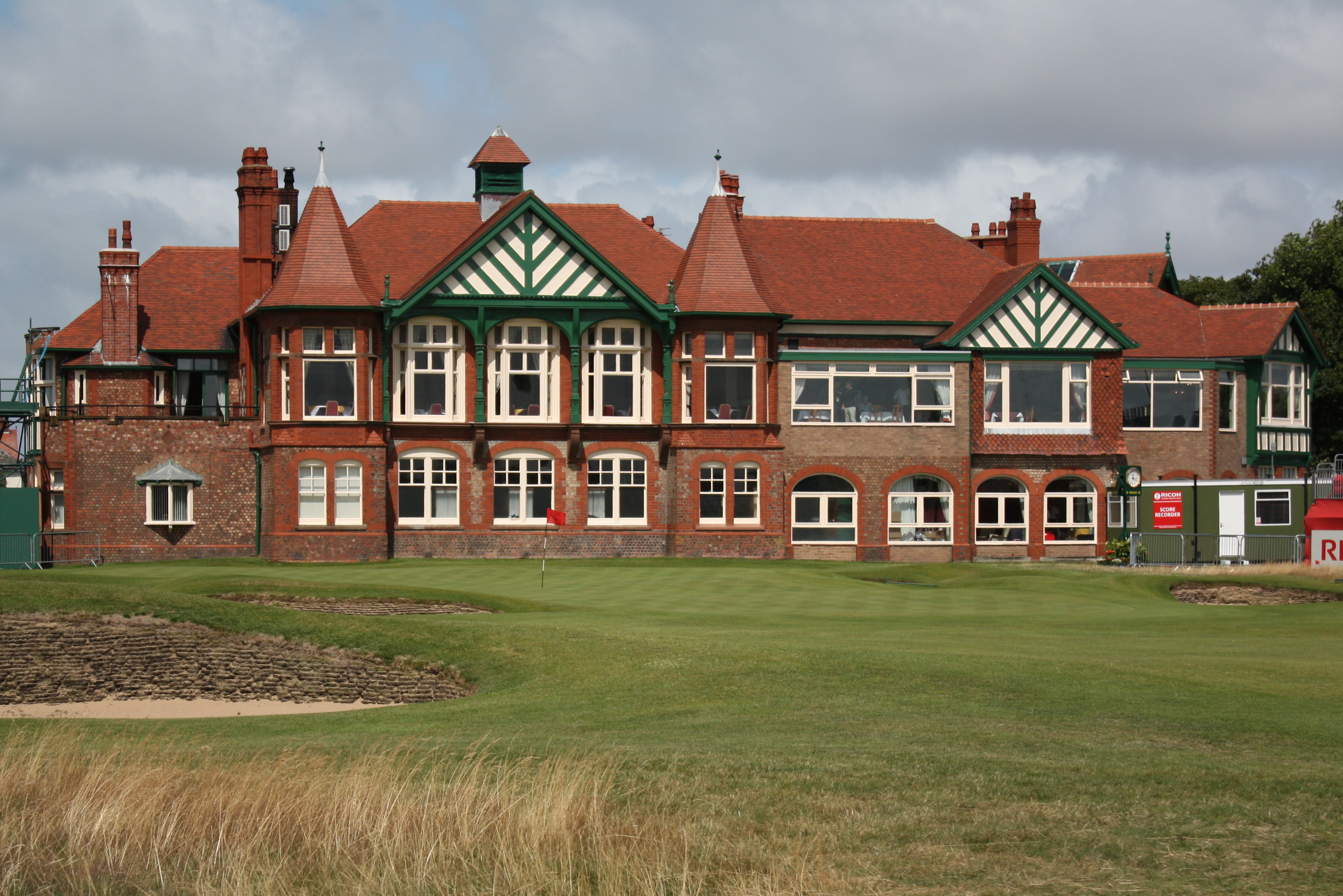
Royal Lytham & St Annes GC clubhouse

== Field ==
123 players entered the competition. Two of them withdraw and one was disqualified. 66 players, 56 professionals and ten amateurs, made the 36-hole cut.

Joel Hirsch, United States, finished leading amateur on fifth place.

=== Past champions in the field ===
Four past Senior British Open champions participated. All of them made the 36-hole cut, Bob Charles (won), Gary Player (tied 2nd), John Fourie (8th) and Bobby Verway (tied 25th). 1987 champion Neil Coles did not play.

=== Past winners and runners-up at The Open Championship in the field ===
The field included three former winners of The Open Championship. All of them made the cut, Bob Charles (won), Gary Player (tied 2nd) and Arnold Palmer (tied 13th).

The field also included two former runners-up at The Open Championship; Brian Huggett (tied 5th) and Christy O'Connor Snr (tied 9th).

== Final results ==
Sunday, 25 July 1993

Place	Player	Score	To par	Money (€)
1	(New Zealand) Bob Charles	73-73-71-74=291	+7	51,310
T2	(England) Tommy Horton	73-72-73-74=292	+8	26,467
T2	(South Africa) Gary Player	73-74-72-73=292	+8	26,467
4	(England) Tony Grubb	77-73-71-72=293	+9	15,400
5	(United States) Joel Hirsch (a)	73-71-74-77=295	+11	–
T6	(Republic of Ireland) Liam Higgins	70-71-76-79=296	+12	11,921
T6	(Wales) Brian Huggett	72-73-75-76=296	+12	11,921
8	(United States) Art Proctor	73-76-73-75=297	+13	9,240
9	(South Africa) John Fourie	72-77-75-74=298	+14	7,695
T10	(Northern Ireland) Norman Drew	73-73-73-80=299	+15	6,009
T10	(Republic of Ireland) Christy O'Connor Snr	72-77-72-78=299	+15	6,009
T10	(Spain) José Maria Roca	75-72-75-77=299	+15	6,009
T10	(England) David Snell	74-78-69-78=299	+15	6,009

(a) denotes amateur, who did not receive any prize money.

Preceded by 1993 U.S. Senior Open	Senior Major Championships	Succeeded by 1994 The Tradition
