= Tony Mangan (golfer) =

Australian professional golfer (born c 1947

Personal information
- Full name: Anthony Mangan
- Nickname: "Champagne"
- Nationality: Australia
- Born: circa 1947

Career
- Sport: Golf
- Turned professional: 1964
- Former tours: PGA Tour of Australasia; Asia Golf Circuit
- Professional wins: 5

Anthony Mangan (circa 1947) is an Australian professional golfer. Mangan turned pro as a teenager and had early success as a pro, winning the Forbes Open and North Coast Open in 1969. Tendonitis issues, however, quickly arrested his progress and he took a club job in the country of Brunei in the early 1970s. In the 1980s, Mangan returned to Australia where he continued to work as a club pro while still occasionally playing significant events, notably winning the 1985 New South Wales PGA Foursomes Championship with partner Vic Bennetts.

== Professional career ==
By 1964, Mangan had turned professional. He began work as an assistant professional at the Merewether Golf Club in Adamstown, New South Wales. In the mid-1960s, Mangan first received media attention. At the 1964 New South Wales Assistant Professionals Championship, he had a "whirlwind" tournament; he opened the two-round event with a 73 but "crashed" with an 80 to lose. The following year, he opened with a 76 to take the lead. The final round was reduced to nine holes due to rain. Against "miserable conditions," Mangan shot a front nine 38. He won by three.

The 1968–69 season included Mangan's first era of regular high performances. Late in 1968, Mangan played on the New Zealand Golf Circuit. At the Sax Altman Tournament, Mangan opened with a two-under-par 70 to put him in a tie for second place, three back of Guy Wolstenholme. He eventually finished in fifth place, five behind co-champions Wolstenholme and Peter Thomson. Two weeks later, at the Caltex Tournament, held at Paraparaumu Beach Golf Club, Mangan opened with a three-under-par 68 to put him three behind Bob Charles. Mangan eventually finished in joint second. Returning to Australia in the New Year, Mangan won the two-round Amoco Forbes Open. In June, he played the Southwark $1,000 purse at Mount Gambier Golf Club. He opened with a 68 to break the course record and take the lead. He would go on to win the event.

Mangan had a number of high finishes in the early 1969–1970 season. In August, he finished joint second at the Roseville Purse, one behind Vic Bennetts. A month later, he played the West End Tournament at Victor Harbour Golf Links. The Victor Harbour Times referred to Mangan as one of the favorites. Mangan indeed played well, opening with a 69 to hold the joint lead. He failed to break 70 in the final three rounds but still finished in the top ten. In October, he played the Australian Open. In the second round, on Friday, he received a significant amount of media attention. On the front nine, he "had the best early nine-holes figure of 32" and finished the round in the top ten. Though he faded with a third round 79 he closed with an even-par 72 to finish in the top 20 at the star-studded event.

Mangan's career is best known for his performance at the 1969 North Coast Open. He came into the tournament with 100-1 odds to win. Mangan opened with a one-over-par 73 to put himself outside of the top ten. His following round was not much more impressive, an even-par 72, but it moved him into the joint lead. Most of the top players "crashed" in the round facilitating his lead. Mangan was astonished he was in the lead given his mediocre scores. "I'm in front? Surely there's somebody better than me," he told The Sydney Morning Herald after the round. In the third round, Mangan struggled with poor driving but excellent chipping made up for it. After another even-par 72 he remained tied for the lead, this time with David Graham. In joint third were Randall Vines and Vic Bennetts, three behind. In the final round Mangan again struggled with driving but once again "his magnificent chipping saved him." Meanwhile, his competitors collapsed. Overnight leader Graham "had little to offer" and wound up with a five-over-par 77. Vines briefly took the lead but "crashed" on the back nine to fall out of the picture. Mangan's two-over-par 74 was enough to defeat Graham by three. Mangan was "genuinely surprised he was able to win." He told the Herald after the tournament: "It's just not possible to play like I did and still get up." Mangan finished with a three-over-par 291 total. He earned A$1,200.

Mangan had an up and down 1970 season. Late in the year he referred to season as "playing well without scoring well." In January, he played the Cronulla Masters. He "was the early leader" with a 65. However, he was not near the lead down the stretch. Late in the month, he played the Golden Crumpet purse, a precursor to the Tasmanian Open. He won the event, shooting a seven-under-par 66, defeating Terry Kendall and David Graham by two. Mangan's win was reported by The New York Times. Later in the month, he began playing on the Asia Golf Circuit. At the Philippine Open he was in joint second after the first round. However, he finished well outside the top ten. In August, he finished third at the South Pacific Open, only behind Bill Dunk and Brian Moran. The following month he played the New South Wales Amateurs versus Professional Matchplay. "Everything hung on the last match" between Mangan and amateur Phil Wood. However, Mangan was unable to birdie the final hole; Wood defeated him 1 up and the professionals lost 4.5 to 3.5. Late in the month, Mangan played the New South Wales PGA Championship. He was one of the favorites according to The Sydney Morning Herald. Mangan opened with a three-under-par 69 to put himself in joint second, one back. He shot a second round 76 to fall out of contention though matched par on the weekend to finish fourth. In October, he recorded another top five at the West End Tournament. In November, he attempted to defend his North Coast Open championship. However, he opened the tournament with a "disastrous" quadruple-bogey to immediately fall out of the picture.

In the early 1970s, Mangan's career was disrupted by tendonitis. In 1971, he became afflicted by the condition. Due to the condition Mangan was unable to play on the Australian circuit or New Zealand Golf Circuit. In May 1972, he began work at Panaga Golf Club in the country of Brunei. Mangan intended to work there for three or four months. "While I'm there I'll be able to give my hand a good rest, and hope to be right again for the major tournaments at the end of the year," he said. Mangan returned to the Australian circuit late in the year. At the North Coast Open he actually led after the second and third rounds. However, a "recurring arm injury" disrupted his play in the final round and he finished fourth. The following week he withdrew from the New South Wales Open due to the arm injury. Late in the year he began work as a golf coach for the New South Wales Golf Association, coaching junior golfers. In 1974, Mangan returned to Brunei to work at Panaga. He also worked at a nine-hole course called Miri Golf Club. Both clubs were operated by Shell Oil Company. In addition, Mangan would give golf lessons to Shell employees. Mangan still occasionally returned to Australia to play significant tournaments. In 1974, he played the North Coast Open, the site of his big win. In 1975, he won the Queensland PGA Foursomes, a pairs event, with partner Vic Bennetts.

In the 1980s, Mangan began working at Steelworks Club in Newcastle, New South Wales. Mangan still occasionally played professional golf during his time at Steelworks. In 1985, he won the New South Wales PGA Foursomes Championship, playing with regular partner Bennetts. In the 1990s, Mangan continued working at Steelworks.

== Professional wins (5) ==
- 1965 New South Wales Assistant Professionals Championship
- 1969 Amoco Forbes Open, North Coast Open
- 1975 Queensland PGA Foursomes Championship (with Vic Bennetts)
- 1985 New South Wales PGA Foursomes Championship (with Vic Bennetts)
