= 1969 Piccadilly World Match Play Championship =

Coordinates: 51°23′48″N 0°35′45″W

Tournament information
- Dates: 9–11 October 1969
- Location: Virginia Water, Surrey, England
- Course(s): West Course, Wentworth
- Format: Match play – 36 holes

Statistics
- Par: 74
- Length: 6,997 yards (6,398 m)
- Field: 8 players
- Prize fund: £18,400
- Winner's share: £5,750

Champion
- (New Zealand) Bob Charles
- def. Gene Littler after 37 holes

The 1969 Piccadilly World Match Play Championship was the sixth World Match Play Championship. It was played from Thursday 9 to Saturday 11 October on the West Course at Wentworth. Eight players competed in a straight knock-out competition, with each match contested over 36 holes. The champion received £5,750 out of a total prize fund of £18,400. In the final, Bob Charles beat Gene Littler with an eagle at the 37th hole.

For the first time all tickets had to be bought in advance. Tickets cost £2 and were restricted to 8,000 on the first day, 5,000 on the second and 3,000 for the final.

The tournament that had, in previous years, been played on the East Course immediately before the World Match Play Championship was replaced by the Piccadilly Medal played at Prince's Golf Club from 16 to 19 July. 64 players competed in the knock-out stroke play competition with early rounds being over 18 holes and a 36-hole final. The winner was Peter Alliss who won £1,500.

== Course ==
Hole	1	2	3	4	5	6	7	8	9	Out	10	11	12	13	14	15	16	17	18	In	Total
Yards	476	157	457	497	192	347	403	400	460	3,389	190	408	480	437	183	480	380	555	495	3,608	6,997
Par	5	3	4	5	3	4	4	4	4	36	3	4	5	4	3	5	4	5	5	38	74

== Scores ==
Quarter-finals; 9 October
(South Africa) Gary Player	10 & 8
(France) Jean Garaïalde
(United States) Gene Littler	6 & 5
(United States) Raymond Floyd
(England) Maurice Bembridge
(New Zealand) Bob Charles	6 & 5
(England) Tony Jacklin
(United States) Tommy Aaron	6 & 4

Semi-finals; 10 October
(South Africa) Gary Player
(United States) Gene Littler	4 & 3
(New Zealand) Bob Charles	9 & 7
(United States) Tommy Aaron

Final; 11 October
(United States) Gene Littler
(New Zealand) Bob Charles	37 h

== Prize money ==
Prize money was increased by 15% for previous years with the winner receiving £5,750 out of a total prize fund of £18,400.
