= 1973–74 New Zealand Golf Circuit =

Golf tour season

1973–74 New Zealand Golf Circuit season
- Duration: 15 November 1973 – 6 January 1974
- Number of official events: 5
- Most wins: (New Zealand) Bob Charles (2) (New Zealand) John Lister (2)
- Money list: (New Zealand) Bob Charles

The 1973–74 New Zealand Golf Circuit was the 11th season of the New Zealand Golf Circuit, the main professional golf tour in New Zealand since it was established in 1963.

== Schedule ==
The following table lists official events during the 1973–74 season.

Date	Tournament	Location	Purse (NZ$)	Winner (Note: The number in brackets after each winner's name is the number of New Zealand Golf Circuit events they had won up to and including that tournament. This information is only shown for New Zealand Golf Circuit members.)	Notes
18 Nov	City of Auckland Classic	Auckland	24,000	(New Zealand) Bob Charles (16)	
25 Nov	New Zealand Open	Manawatu-Wanganui	16,000	(New Zealand) Bob Charles (17)	
2 Dec	Otago Charity Classic	Otago	25,000	(New Zealand) John Lister (4)	
9 Dec	Garden City Classic	Canterbury	15,000	(New Zealand) John Lister (5)	
6 Jan	New Zealand PGA Championship	Bay of Plenty	15,000	(Australia) Kel Nagle (17)	

== Money list ==
The money list was based on tournament results during the season, calculated in New Zealand dollars.

Position	Player	Prize money (NZ$)
1	(New Zealand) Bob Charles	10,100
2	(New Zealand) John Lister	8,997
3	(Australia) Robert Taylor	
