= Vic Bennetts =

Australian professional golfer

Personal information
- Nationality: Australia
- Born: May 1944 (age 82)

Career
- Sport: Golf
- Turned professional: 1968
- Former tours: PGA Tour of Australasia, Asia Golf Circuit, European Tour
- Professional wins: at least 17

Number of wins by tour
- PGA Tour of Australasia: 1
- Other: 16

Vic Bennetts (born May 1944) is an Australian professional golfer. Bennetts had an excellent amateur career through the 1960s, becoming the first golfer to win the New South Wales Junior Championship three times. Bennetts turned pro in 1968 and quickly had much success, culminating with his "golden year" of 1971 where he won 12 events. Injuries and poor discipline over the next few years, however, arrested his progress. In the mid-1970s, Bennetts teamed up with fitness trainer Ray Anderson who significantly improved his performance, highlighted by a victory at the 1975 Australian PGA Championship, his biggest win. For the remainder of his career, Bennetts primarily worked as a driving range owner, director of golf at Moore Park Golf Course in Sydney, and club professional.

== Early life ==
Bennetts started playing golf at the age of five. At the age of 12, he won his first club championship. As a teenager, he attended Maroubra Bay High School in Maroubra, New South Wales, a suburb of Sydney. Bennetts largely learned to play golf at Moore Park Golf Club and St. Michael's Golf Course, both near Sydney.

== Amateur career ==
In the middle of 1959, he received media attention for one of the first times. On May 14, it was reported by The Sydney Morning Herald that he won the St. George's schoolboys' championship with rounds of 73 and 68. A few days later he recorded a solo second-place finish at the New South Wales schoolboys championship held at Ryde-Parramatta Golf Club.

In the early 1960s, he received much media attention. Early in 1961, he won the junior title of the St. Michael's Cup. In April, it was announced that he was selected to represent New South Wales for the Australian Junior Interstate Matches for the first time. Also during the year, Bennetts also won the New South Wales Junior Championship. It was his first win in the event. In early 1962, he played the two-round South Coast Amateur Championship in Sydney, Australia. At the par-70 course, Bennetts shot rounds of 69 and 68 to win the event by three strokes. In the long history of the event, he became its youngest-ever winner. In May, he played the inaugural New South Wales Junior Mixed Foursomes tournament at Bonnie Doon Golf Club. His partner was Jill Higinbotham. The pair won the event with a 77 (+5), defeating the nearest competitors by six strokes. During this era, he was strongly associated with Moore Park Golf Course.

Over the next two years Bennetts received more media attention. In June 1963, he played the one-round Winter Cup. Bennetts shot an even-par round of 72 to win the event. He was the youngest-ever winner of the event. In late August, it was announced that Bennetts earned entry into the Australian Men's Interstate Teams Matches representing New South Wales. In December, he played the Australian Cup, a scratch fourball vs. par event, held at The Australian Golf Club in Sydney. Bennetts paired with Wayne McIntosh. Their team "staged a brilliant finish" with birdies at the final three holes to tie Vic Bulgin and Reginald Dunn at the end of regulation. In March 1964, he played the New South Wales Junior Championship. Due to poor weather the tournament was reduced to 27 holes. Bennetts opened the tournament with two double-bogeys but "settled down" from there. With scores of 82 and 39, Bennetts won by one over George Bell. Later in March, he captained Moore Park's team at the Eric Apperly Golf Shield. Bennetts led Moore Park to its first victory in the event. In July, he was selected to play the Carnarvon Cup again. Bennetts shot a 73 (+2) to win the cup. In November, he played the two-round Champion of Champions tournament at Ryde-Parramatta. Bennetts tied Peter Lungham at the end of regulation at two-over-par 144. The two played an 18-hole playoff to determine the champion. In the playoff, Bennetts recorded five birdies on the front nine on the way to a 32 (−4) and a seven stroke lead. He eventually won it by six, 68 to 74. He became the first golf to win the New South Wales Junior Championship and Champions of Champions in the same year.

Early in 1965, he was referred to as New South Wales' "outstanding junior golfer" by The Sydney Morning Herald. He had much success over the course of the year. In March, he played the New South Wales Junior Championship. Bennetts shot rounds of 71 and 70 to defeat Terry Beaver and Barry Burgess by four strokes. His aggregate was one off Phil Billings record. He became the first player to win the event three times. Shortly thereafter, he was selected to be the captain of New South Wales's team at the Australian Junior Interstate Team Matches. Held in Western Australia, New South Wales won the event for the first time in three years. He was also selected to represent New South Wales in an amateur competition against the Southern Tablelands district that fall. In July, he won the Carnarvon Cup with a 70 (−1). The following week he finished in joint second place with teammate Trevor Wood at the New South Wales Foursomes Championship, two behind the leading pair of John Barras and John Bennetts. In late August, he played the City of Sydney Open, a professional tournament. In the second round, Bennetts shot a "brilliant" 68 (−3) to tie Barry Burgess for the low amateur score. In November, he played the two-round Champions of Champions tournament at Royal Sydney Golf Club. Bennetts was well back during most of the final round. However, leader Peter Headland "dropped four shots over the last four holes to give Bennetts a chance to beat him." At the last, though, Bennetts "took three from the edge at the 18th to lose by a shot." Later in the month, Bennetts played the Australian Men's Interstate Teams Matches. The matches were held at Royal Melbourne Golf Club. Bennetts went undefeated in his early matches. In his team's final match, New South Wales played Western Australia. Bennetts played John Ewings in his individual match. Bennetts was never behind on his way to a 3 & 2 victory. He was considered to be the "hero" of New South Wales' team by The Sydney Morning Herald. During this era, Bennetts was also considered by The Canberra Times to be "one of Sydney's and NSW's leading amateurs."

In 1966, Bennetts recorded a number of highlights, "generally" holding his "form this season." In April, he was slated to play the three-round Australia Capital Territory (ACT) Amateur. He was considered one of the favorites. Bennetts opened with rounds of 78 and 77 but closed with an even-par 72. At the end of regulation, he was tied for the lead with Bill Donohoe, also out of Moore Park, and Gerald Focken. In the six-hole playoff, Focken "coasted home" to defeat Bennetts and Donohoe by three. Later, there was a playoff between Bennetts and Donohoe to decide second place. Bennetts won the playoff. A month later, he played the Concord Cup for the fourth time. He shot rounds of 71–72 to win by one. In September, it was announced he would represent the New South Wales at Australian Men's Interstate Teams Matches later in the year. In October, he played the New South Wales Mixed Foursomes Golf Championship at Ryde-Parramatta with partner Carol Blair. The pair "combined brilliantly" with a first round 71. On the par-3 final hole of the tournament they looked sure to win. However, the pair recorded a quadruple-bogey 7 to fall into a tie with team of Don Sharp and Ann Kenny. However, Bennetts and Blair defeated Sharp and Kenny by a shot in a six-hole playoff to win the event. In October, he played the Australian National Foursome Championship with partner Des Turner. The team opened "consistently" with a 69 (−4) and then closed with a 72 (−1). They won by a shot over Denis Bell and Don Flave.

As of February 1967, he had earned rights to play for New South Wales' team once again at the Australian Men's Interstate Teams Matches. Late in the month he played in the St. Michael's Cup. He finished in a tie for second place with Des Turner, only behind champion Don Sharp. In March, he started playing pennant matches for St. Michael's. In May, he defeated Pennant Hills' Tony Gresham in a match. Later in the month, St. Michael's defeated Bankstown to move into the finals. Bennetts defeated Vic Bulgin in his individual match. In May, he also finished in second place at the Concord Cup, one back of champion Barry Burgess, in a tie for second with Bulgin. Later in the year, he successfully defended his New South Wales Mixed Foursomes Golf Championship with Carol Blair.

== Professional career ==
In 1968, Bennetts did not earn membership for Australia's 1968 Eisenhower Trophy team. Influenced by this rejection, Bennetts decided to turn professional. He decided to turn pro as a "playing professional" rather than pursuing the club pro apprenticeship path. Bennetts made his professional debut on 29 April 1968 at the Monash Masters.

Bennetts first received significant media attention as a professional for his performance at the New South Wales PGA Championship. The event was played in August 1968. Bennetts was in the top three during the first three rounds. He finished in a tie for fourth. In November, Bennetts began playing the North Coast Open. He was considered one of the favorites by The Sydney Morning Herald. Bennetts opened with rounds of 71 and 70 to put him in solo sixth place. In the third round, despite "blustery conditions," Bennetts scored six birdies to shoot a 69 (−3) and tie Les Wilson for the lead. Bennetts had a "nervous" final round, however, scoring erratically. He bogeyed the second hole and eagled the par-5 5th hole. He then recorded a number of bogeys in the middle of the round to fall over par for the day. However, his primary competitor, Wilson, "could not get his putter to work" and shot a 75 (+3). Bob Stanton and Stan Peach and were also briefly in the lead but did not play well down the stretch. On the par-5 17th hole, meanwhile, Bennetts hit a five-foot putt that "hung on the lip of the cup then dropped in for a birdie four." This "clinch[ed]" the title. With a one-over-par 73, he finished at 283 (−5) and defeated Wilson by two shots. Because he held "probationary" professional status, however, Bennetts could not earn any prize money. In December, he played the New South Wales PGA Foursomes Championship with Vic Richardson, a club pro from Moore Park. The event was at Monash Golf Club. With rounds of 71 and 73, their team won the event. Like his experience at Coffs Harbour, however, Bennetts was not allowed to collect any prize money. Later in the season, Bennetts recorded top ten finishes at the Brisbane Water Tournament and Aeron Golf Classic. In April 1969, Bennetts completed his "12-month probationary period" to become a fully-fledged touring professional.

Later in 1969, around the time of the southern hemisphere spring, Bennetts won a number of minor events. In early August, he won the Bankstown purse. Two weeks later he won the Roseville purse with a bogey-free 62 (−2), defeating David Graham, Doug Maggs, and Tony Mangan by a shot. In early October, Bennetts played the Rothman's pro-am at Fox Hills. He tied for the win with Avondale professional Malcolm Wills, with a 65 (−5). Overall, Bennetts won six tournaments during the year. During this era, Bennetts was receiving much praise for his performance. The legendary golfer Peter Thomson referred to Bennetts as one of the top new Australian pros "fresh from the amateur ranks" along with Jack Newton. According to John Hourigan, golf writer for The Canberra Times, Bennetts was among the top Australian golfers to have turned pro in the 1960s along with Bruce Devlin, Ted Ball, Bob Mesnil, and Graham Marsh.

In early 1970, Bennetts had much success at minor golf tournaments in the Australasian region. During the first week of the year, he played the Spalding Masters at Tauranga Golf Course in Tauranga, New Zealand. At the par-70 course, Bennetts opened with rounds of 67-69-70 to tie for the lead with Paul Morgan. Bennetts, however, closed with a 72 (+2) to finish in solo third, two back of champion Stuart Jones. Two weeks later, he played the Endeavour Masters at Cronulla Golf Club in Sydney, Australia. Bennetts was "steadily among the leaders from start to finish" and finished in a tie for second with Kel Nagle and Ted Ball. Later in the season, Bennetts recorded top ten finishes at the New South Wales Open and South Australian Open. He also started playing on he Asia Golf Circuit during this era.

In late 1970, Bennetts began playing on the Australian circuit once again. He had much success at minor tournaments during this era. In August, he finished in joint second place at the Roseville Gold Mashie, one behind champion Mike Kelly. Shortly thereafter, he won the Deliliquin Open, an event held in rural New South Wales. In September, he played the New South Wales Pros verses Amateurs matchplay in Killara. He "trounced" Lance Manson in the finals to win the event. In October, he played the Rothman's pro-am held at Federal Golf Club in Canberra. He shot a 68 (−5) to win the event by three shots and broke the course record. He defeated notable golfers like Kel Nagle and Jack Newton by several shots. At more "major" tournaments held later in the year, however, he had mixed results. In late September, he played the New South Wales PGA Championship. He was considered one of the favorites. However, Bennetts failed to break par in the tournament and finished outside of the top ten. Two weeks later, in October, he played the West End Tournament. Bennetts failed to break par the first two days. However, in the two-round finale, Bennetts shot rounds of 70 to finish in a tie for sixth. Later in October, Bennetts played the Australian Open. He opened with a 71 (−1) to put him in tie for second, one back of leader Frank Phillips. However, he shot a second round 74 (+2) to put him "far behind." He ultimately finished in a tie for 17th, well back of champion Gary Player. Later in the month he began play at the Dunlop International. Bennetts opened with a three-over-par 75 and was never in contention thereafter. However, he responded with three consecutive under-par rounds to finish in a tie for 12th with America's Arnold Palmer and Spain's Ángel Gallardo. In November, he played the North Coast Open, the site of his first professional victory. In the first round, Bennetts "had trouble in the boisterous conditions" and shot a 76 (+4) putting him eight shots back. In the second round, despite "impossible conditions," Bennetts was two-under-par after 14 holes to move into contention. However, the second round was "abandoned" due to "torrential rain." Bennetts good round was expunged. This turned out to be one of the "hard luck stories" of the tournament. Bennetts shot over par for the remainder of the tournament and was not in contention.

Later in the season, like the previous year, Bennetts played on the New Zealand Golf Circuit. He again had success in the country. In December, he played the Otago Charity Classic. The event was held at the par-72 St. Clair Golf Course. Bennetts opened with rounds of 66 and 71 to tie Thailand's Sukree Onsham and Australia's Kel Nagle for the lead. In the third round, he shot a two-under-par 70 to take the solo lead. Bennetts was in "top form" on Sunday, shooting a 67 (−5). However, he turned out to be "unlucky" as Nagle "unleashed a sensational round of 63" which broke the course record. Nagle won the tournament defeating Bennetts by two strokes. Shortly thereafter, he began play at the New Zealand PGA Championship. In the second and third rounds, despite "rain, thunder and lightning," Bennetts shot consecutive rounds in 60s to move into contention, in a tie for third with Peter Thomson. Bennetts again played well in the final round, this time shooting a seven-under-par 66 to finish in a tie for second with Graham Marsh.

In 1971, Bennetts had much success. In the middle of the year he started playing on Australia's "winter circuit" in South Australia. In May, he won the South Australian PGA Championship by nine shots over Jerry Stolhand and Barry Coxon. The following month, in June, he tied Coxon for the win at the Blue Lake Classic. Overall, he won three event on the South Australian circuit. He also finished in second place at three events. Shortly thereafter, he moved onto the "northern circuit" in Queensland. In July, he won the Greater Townsville Open. Later in the month, he began play at the City of Cairns Open. After two rounds he was at 138, three ahead of Duncan Park. He would go on to win the event. During the last week of July, he began play at the Queensland Open. Bennetts opened with rounds of 69 (−3) to take the lead with Geoff Smart. In the third round, Bennetts shot a 70 (−2), maintaining the lead, now with Ted Ball. In the final round, Bennetts "withstood all challengers," shooting a 69 (−3), to win easily. By August, he had won eight tournaments on the winter circuit. In the middle of the month he played the two-round Yass pro-am. He opened with a course record 63 (−5) and went on to win. He earned A$380. This brought his seasonal earnings up to A$3,500. With the win Bennetts "picked up the winner's purse for the ninth time in three months." By the end of August, he had won 12 tournaments through the year. 1971 was later deemed to be his "golden year" by The Sydney Morning Herald.

However, his play "slipped sadly" over the ensuring years. Injuries contributed to poor play. In September 1971, he "damaged a muscle in his left arm" which affected the use of his left thumb. He did not play golf for a month. Bennetts returned to play golf in early October at the North Coast Open. Bennetts was unable to complete the tournament, however. The following week he played the Australian PGA Championship. Despite continued thumb trouble, Bennetts played well in the first two rounds and was near the lead. Once again, however, Bennetts was unable to complete the tournament. The tendonitis issues manifested themselves once more. Bennetts was unable to play again, this time for several months. By February 1972, however, he was playing again. During the first week of the month he played the Victorian Open. Bennetts received daily cortisone injections during the tournament to mitigate the pain. Bennetts had some early success, opening with a 70 (−3) to put him near the lead. In the second round he shot an even-par 73 to remain near the lead, in solo second, four back of Guy Wolstenholme. Bennetts shot over-par for the remainder of the tournament, however, to finish nine shots back, in solo sixth.

For the remainder of 1972, Bennetts played primarily overseas. Bennetts started playing again on the Asia Golf Circuit in February. In March, he recorded a 9th-place finish at the Singapore Open. Overall, however, Bennetts made "little impression" on the Asian circuit. By May, Bennetts was playing in Europe. Late in the month he played the Sumrie Better-Ball, a pairs event, with South African Terry Westbrook. In the third round the pair shot a five-under-par 67, putting themselves at an aggregate of 199, one back of the lead. During the final round's front nine, Bennetts and Westbrook shot a 33 (−3) during the front nine to stay near the lead. Bennetts and Westbrook remained in contention at the par-4, 470-yard, 16th hole. However, both "disastrously" hit their approaches out of bounds. This led to a triple bogey and the end of their hopes. The team finished in solo fourth place, four back. A few weeks later, in June, Bennetts recorded another top ten at the Martini International. Due to his recent good performances, Bennetts was convinced he had turned things around. Later in the month he played the Carroll's International in Ireland. He opened in tie for second place with fellow Australian Stewart Ginn after a 73 (−1), one shot behind leader Tertius Claassens. Bennetts followed it up with an even-par-74 to remain in contention. However, he was up to his "old faults" during the final two rounds and was not in contention. "I decided then and there that I was wasting my time staying in Britain any longer," he later said. Frustrated with his play, he abruptly cancelled his entry into British Open qualifying process.

Bennetts returned to Australia shortly thereafter. For the remainder of the early 1970s, Bennetts had the chance to win several events but failed to follow through down the stretch. In October 1972, he played the New South Wales Open. Bennetts was in contention for the first three rounds. However, he shot an 83 (+11) during the final round and finished outside the top 25. It was "his worst-ever score as a professional." The following week he played the Wills Masters. Bennetts was in the top three through the first three rounds. However, in the final round he "failed to maintain his sub-par rounds," shooting a 76 (+4), to finish well back. In November, he played the New Zealand Open. Bennetts was tied for the lead entering the final round. However, he shot over-par in the final round and was not in contention down the stretch. The following year, in September 1973, Bennetts played the South Australian Open. Bennetts opened with a 70, tying for the lead. Bennetts shot even-par the following round to stay in contention. However, he scored rounds in the mid-70s during the final two rounds to finish well back. During this period of struggle, Bennetts also worked as a waiter, laborer, and strapper at a racehorse stable to help make ends meet. Bennetts later cited poor discipline as a major factor for his weak performances during this era. He later told The Sydney Morning Herald, "I know haven't had enough dedication... I admit I haven't worked as hard as I could."

In the mid-1970s, however, Bennetts had more success. In 1974, he met physical fitness trainer Ray Anderson. Anderson encouraged him to work out and advised him on his workouts in an effort to improve his game. In January 1974, he played the Coca-Cola Lakes Open. Bennetts finished at 298 (+6), in a tie for fourth place, one out of a playoff. In February, he finished in a tie for second at the Cumberland pro-am with a 69 (−3), again one back. Later in the month he played the inaugural Catalina Country Club pro-am. Bennetts opened with a four-under-par 67 to break the course record and went on to win the event. Much later in the year, Bennetts won a tournament at Bundaberg. He also won a tournament at Bergara during the year. At the beginning on the 1974–75 season, Bennetts recorded top ten finishes at West End Tournament and New South Wales Open. In January 1975, he played the two-round New Britain Open in Papua New Guinea. Bennetts played well and had the tournament "almost in the bag" until Ian Stanley tied him late. Stanley then defeated him in a sudden-death playoff. In March, Bennetts won the Taree pro-am golf tournament in a playoff over Bill Dunk. In May, he recorded a joint runner-up at the South Australian PGA Championship, two behind champion Vaughan Somers. In August, he played the two-round Tuggerah Lakes Open in Wyong, New South Wales. Bennetts was in eighth place late in the tournament. However, he birdied the final three holes to leapfrog a number of players and tie for the win. He tied Rob McNaughton at 141.

In September 1975, Bennetts played the Australian PGA Championship at Burleigh Heads. After two rounds he was at 144, two-over-par, near the lead. In the third round, Bennetts "had only two birdies," missing a number of "possible birdie putts," but his even-par 71 was enough to take the solo lead. Bennetts was "astounded" that he was in the lead given his high score. He led by one over a number of players. In the final round, Bennetts shot two-over par on the front nine to fall into a tie for the lead. He then bogeyed the 10th hole but birdied the 11th and 13th holes to regain the solo lead. However, "the real turning point" occurred at the par-5 14th hole. He played most of the hole poorly. He hit his drive into a grove of trees. His second shot was obscured by the trees so "he elected to hit up an adjoining fairway." He then hit his approach – his third shot – into a bunker. However, he recorded a "miraculous" sand shot, holing it for birdie. This "clinched the title." Bennetts finished with 72 (+1) for a 287 (+3) total and won by three strokes. He said later he would not have won without the advice from his physical fitness trainer, Anderson. Bennetts' victory received international media attention and was reported by The New York Times and Los Angeles Times. It was deemed his "most important success in six years on the circuit." Despite this success, after the tournament it was reported that his "future tournament performances would be restricted." According to The Canberra Times, Bennetts "had an interest in a Sydney golf-driving range and would be devoting much of his time to this." The driving range would be held at Moore Park, New South Wales, near where he learned to play golf.

In the late 1970s Bennetts still played in some tournaments, mainly minor events in the Pacific islands on their "Tropical Tour." In January 1976, he elected to play in the New Britain Open in Papua New Guinea rather than defend his Australian PGA Championship. This decision caused some controversy. The Australian PGA "refused permission" for him to play the event. Bennetts, however, "fulfilled his controversial commitment" by winning the event. In 1978, he again played the New Britain Open. Bennetts was considered one of the favorites. He was in contention late but three-putted the 17th hole of the final round "to throw away any chance." Bennetts finished in joint second place at 220, two behind champion Brian Moran. In early 1979, Bennetts began his "fourth tour" of the Pacific islands circuit. In February, he played the two-round Port Moresby Golf Classic. Bennetts opened poorly over the first 27 holes to put him several shots back. However, he closed with a back nine 31 to finish joint second, three back. Two years later, Bennetts also recorded a joint runner-up finish at the same event, again three back.

In the middle of 1981, Bennetts sold his Moore Park driving range to fellow professional golfer Geoff Scott. Shortly thereafter began work as a club professional at Randwick Golf Club. He also was a committee member for the New South Wales PGA during this era. In the mid-1980s, Bennetts also began playing more on the PGA Tour of Australia. In November 1984, he recorded back-to-back top ten finishes at the Australian PGA Championship and Victorian PGA Championship. In 1985, Bennetts won the New South Wales PGA Foursomes with partner Tony Mangan. In early 1986, Bennetts decided to leave Randwick to work at Royal Sydney Golf Club. He continued to play in some PGA Tour of Australia events. However, he did not record many high results. Bennetts stopped playing events on the PGA Tour of Australia after the 1987–88 season. In the early 1990s, he became Director of Golf at Moore Park Golf Course. He continued to work as a club professional at Royal Sydney Golf Club, however, through the early 2000s. He then took a job at Grafton Golf Club. As of 2018, he had retired from the golf industry. However, late in life, he worked as a horse strapper, as he had briefly during his golf career.

== Personal life ==
As of 1975, Bennetts was married with two young children. During this era he lived in Burleigh Heads, Queensland.

== Amateur wins ==
- 1961 New South Wales Junior Championship
- 1962 South Coast Amateur Championship, New South Wales Junior Mixed Foursomes tournament (with Jill Higinbotham)
- 1964 New South Wales Junior Championship, Champion of Champions tournament
- 1965 New South Wales Junior Championship,
- 1966 New South Wales Mixed Foursomes Golf Championship (with Carol Blair), Australian National Foursome Championship (with Des Turner)
- 1967 New South Wales Mixed Foursomes Golf Championship (with Carol Blair)

== Professional wins ==
=== PGA Tour of Australia wins (1) ===
No.	Date	Tournament	Winning score	Margin of victory	Runners-up
1	22 Sep 1975	Australian PGA Championship	+3 (74-70-71-72=287)	3 strokes	(Australia) Brian Moran, (Australia) Kel Nagle, (Australia) Robert Taylor

=== Other wins (16) ===
note: this list is incomplete

- 1968 North Coast Open, New South Wales PGA Foursomes Championship (with Vic Richardson)
- 1970 New South Wales Pros verses Amateurs matchplay, Deliliquin Open
- 1971 South Australian PGA Championship, Blue Lake Classic (tie with Barry Coxon), Cootamundra tournament, City of Cairns Open, Greater Townsville Open, Queensland Open
- 1974 Bundaberg tournament, Bergara tournament
- 1975 Tuggerah Lakes Open (tie with Rob McNaughton), Queensland PGA Foursomes Championship (with Tony Mangan)
- 1976 New Britain Open
- 1985 New South Wales PGA Foursomes Championship (with Tony Mangan)

== Team appearances ==
Amateur

- Australian Junior Interstate Team Matches (representing New South Wales): 1961, 1962, 1963, 1964, 1965
- Australian Men's Interstate Teams Matches (representing New South Wales): 1963, 1964, 1965, 1966,
- St. Michael's Cup (representing Sydney): 1963
- City verses Country junior competition (representing the City): 1964, 1965
- New South Wales Golf Association verses Southern Tablelands district teams competition (representing New South Wales): 1965
