= Anton Haig =

South African professional golfer

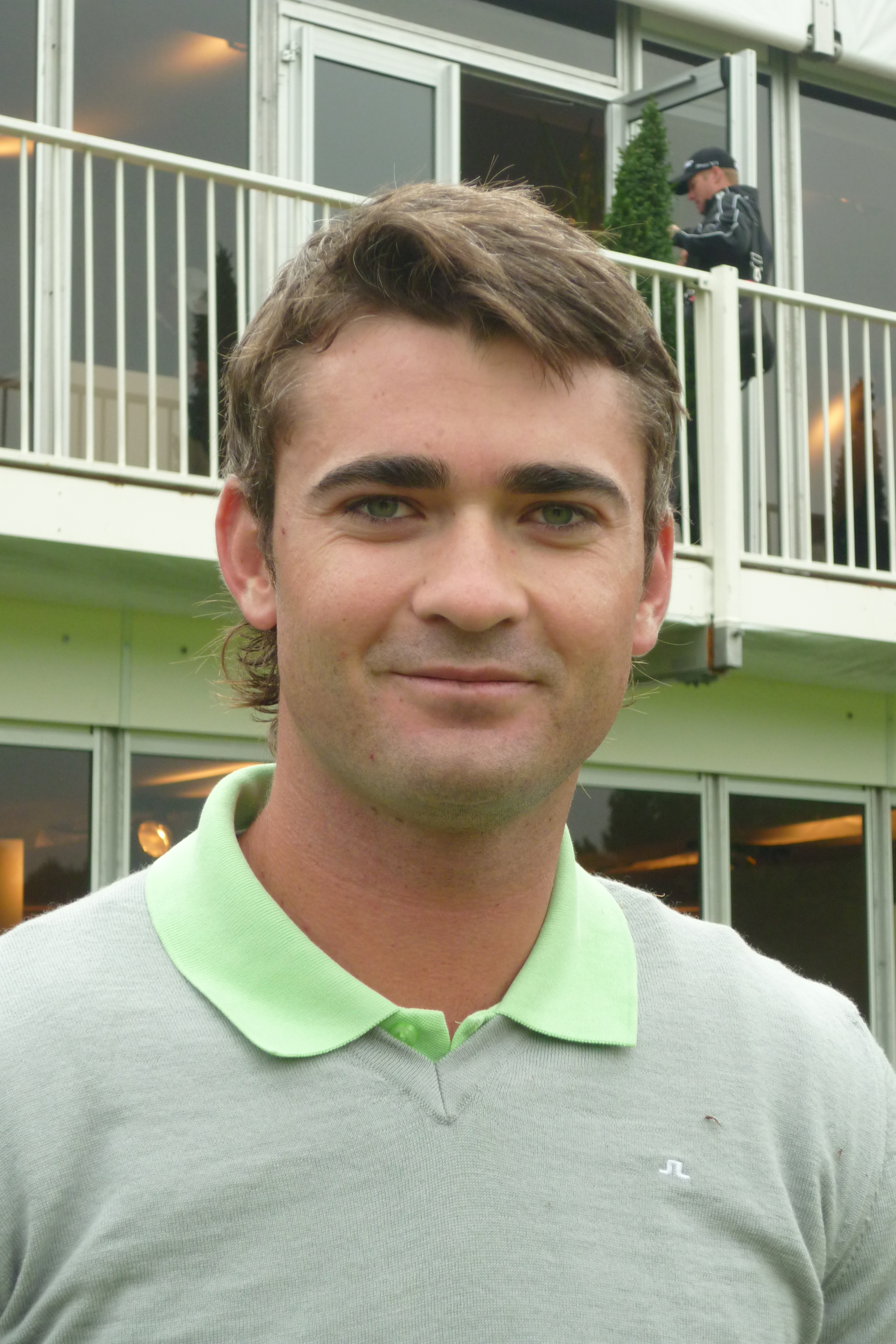

Personal information
- Full name: Anton Jason Haig
- Nationality: South Africa
- Born: 8 May 1986 (age 40) Nelspruit, South Africa
- Height: 6 ft 4 in (1.93 m)
- Weight: 183 lb (83 kg; 13.1 st)

Career
- Sport: Golf
- Turned professional: 2004
- Current tour: Sunshine Tour
- Former tours: European Tour; Asian Tour; Big Easy Tour eGolf Professional Tour
- Professional wins: 11
- Highest ranking: 81 (1 April 2007)

Number of wins by tour
- European Tour: 1
- Asian Tour: 2
- Sunshine Tour: 2
- PGA Tour of Australasia: 1
- Other: 7

Anton Jason Haig (born 8 May 1986) is a South African professional golfer.

== Career ==
Haig was born in Nelspruit. He turned professional on 1 September 2004 and plays on the Sunshine Tour and the Asian Tour. He has won four times worldwide with his biggest win to date occurring at the multi-tour sanctioned Johnnie Walker Classic in March 2007. This victory earned him full European Tour membership and propelled Haig into the top 100 of the Official World Golf Rankings.

After a poor 2009 season, Haig had to regain his European Tour card at qualifying school. Haig fared no better in 2010 and lost his card at the end of the season. Haig announced his retirement from professional golf in November 2011 due to back injuries. In March 2012, Haig announced he would be returning to professional golf and finished T-18 at the Handa Faldo Cambodian Classic on the Asian Tour.

== Amateur wins ==
- 2001 Vodacom Champions (South Africa)
- 2003 South African Amateur, South African Boys Championship

== Professional wins (11) ==
=== European Tour wins (1) ===
No.	Date	Tournament	Winning score	Margin of victory	Runners-up
1	4 Mar 2007	Johnnie Walker Classic^{1}	−13 (71-64-70-70=275)	Playoff	(South Africa) Richard Sterne, (England) Oliver Wilson

^{1}Co-sanctioned by the Asian Tour and the PGA Tour of Australasia

European Tour playoff record (1–0)

No.	Year	Tournament	Opponents	Result
1	2007	Johnnie Walker Classic	(South Africa) Richard Sterne, (England) Oliver Wilson	Won with birdie on first extra hole

=== Asian Tour wins (2) ===
No.	Date	Tournament	Winning score	Margin of victory	Runner(s)-up
1	3 Sep 2006	Pulai Springs Malaysian Masters	−22 (63-66-69-68=266)	1 stroke	(Scotland) Barry Hume
2	4 Mar 2007	Johnnie Walker Classic^{1}	−13 (71-64-70-70=275)	Playoff	(South Africa) Richard Sterne, (England) Oliver Wilson

^{1}Co-sanctioned by the European Tour and the PGA Tour of Australasia

Asian Tour playoff record (1–0)

No.	Year	Tournament	Opponents	Result
1	2007	Johnnie Walker Classic	(South Africa) Richard Sterne, (England) Oliver Wilson	Won with birdie on first extra hole

=== Sunshine Tour wins (2) ===
No.	Date	Tournament	Winning score	Margin of victory	Runner-up
1	1 Oct 2005	Seekers Travel Pro-Am	−12 (70-66-68=204)	Playoff	(South Africa) Nic Henning
2	21 Oct 2006	MTC Namibia PGA Championship	−17 (62-69-65=196)	1 stroke	(South Africa) Thomas Aiken

Sunshine Tour playoff record (1–0)

No.	Year	Tournament	Opponent	Result
1	2005	Seekers Travel Pro-Am	(South Africa) Nic Henning	Won with par on first extra hole

=== Big Easy Tour wins (1) ===
No.	Date	Tournament	Winning score	Margin of victory	Runners-up
1	7 Jun 2013	Irene CC	−10 (64-70=134)	4 strokes	(South Africa) Michael Downes, (South Africa) Kevin Stone

=== eGolf Professional Tour wins (1) ===
No.	Date	Tournament	Winning score	Margin of victory	Runner-up
1	14 Sep 2012	The Championship at Star Fort	−17 (68-66-65=199)	2 strokes	(United States) Jonathan Fricke

=== IGT Pro Tour wins (5) ===
No.	Date	Tournament	Winning score	Margin of victory	Runner(s)-up
1	20 Apr 2016	ERPM Challenge	−21 (64-69-62=195)	4 strokes	(South Africa) Carrie Park
2	11 May 2016	Houghton Challenge	−10 (74-63-69=206)	3 strokes	(South Africa) Leján Lewthwaite
3	18 May 2016	Ruimsig Challenge	−17 (67-65-67=199)	7 strokes	(South Africa) Damian Naicker, (South Africa) Ryan Wingrove
4	26 Apr 2017	Killarney Challenge	−4 (65-72-69=206)	3 strokes	(South Africa) Arno Pretorius (a)
5	10 May 2017	State Mines Challenge	−16 (71-64-65=200)	4 strokes	(South Africa) Breyten Meyer

== Results in World Golf Championships ==
Tournament	2007	2008
Match Play		
Championship	T32	T65
Invitational	T77	

Did not play

"T" = Tied

== See also ==
- 2009 European Tour Qualifying School graduates
