= Endeavour Masters =

Golf tournament

The Endeavour Masters was a professional golf tournament held in 1970 at the Cronulla Golf Club in Sydney, New South Wales, Australia. Total prize money was A$10,000.

Guy Wolstenholme shot a final round 67 (−2) to finish at 263. He won by eight strokes over Ted Ball, Vic Bennetts and Kel Nagle.

== Winners ==
Year	Winner	Country	Score	To par	Margin of victory	Runners-up	Ref
1970	Guy Wolstenholme	England	263	−13	8 strokes	(Australia) Ted Ball (Australia) Vic Bennetts (Australia) Kel Nagle	
