= 1970–71 New Zealand Golf Circuit =

Golf tour season

1970–71 New Zealand Golf Circuit season
- Duration: 19 November 1970 – 9 January 1971
- Number of official events: 7
- Most wins: (Australia) Graham Marsh (2)
- Money list: (Australia) Graham Marsh

The 1970–71 New Zealand Golf Circuit was the eighth season of the New Zealand Golf Circuit, the main professional golf tour in New Zealand since it was established in 1963.

== Schedule ==
The following table lists official events during the 1970–71 season.

Date	Tournament	Location	Purse (NZ$)	Winner (Note: The number in brackets after each winner's name is the number of New Zealand Golf Circuit events they had won up to and including that tournament. This information is only shown for New Zealand Golf Circuit members.)	Notes
21 Nov	Caltex Tournament	Wellington	7,000	(England) Maurice Bembridge (n/a) (New Zealand) Terry Kendall (2)	Title shared
28 Nov	New Zealand Open	Auckland	12,500	(New Zealand) Bob Charles (12)	
6 Dec	Garden City Classic	Canterbury	15,000	(Australia) Peter Harvey (1)	
13 Dec	Otago Charity Classic	Otago	15,000	(Australia) Kel Nagle (15)	New tournament
19 Dec	Wattie's Tournament	Hawke's Bay	7,000	(Australia) Graham Marsh (1)	
2 Jan	Spalding Masters	Bay of Plenty	5,000	(Australia) Graham Marsh (2)	
9 Jan	Forest Products Stars Travel New Zealand PGA Championship	Bay of Plenty	13,500	(New Zealand) John Lister (2)	

== Money list ==
The money list was based on tournament results during the season, calculated in New Zealand dollars.

Position	Player	Prize money (NZ$)
1	(Australia) Graham Marsh	8,400
