= Kyi Hla Han =

Burmese golfer and administrator (1961–2022)

Personal information
- Nationality: Burma; Myanmar
- Born: 13 February 1961 Yangon, Burma
- Died: 19 February 2022 (aged 61) Singapore

Career
- Sport: Golf
- Turned professional: 1980
- Former tours: Asian Tour; PGA Tour of Australasia
- Professional wins: 12

Number of wins by tour
- Asian Tour: 1
- PGA Tour of Australasia: 1
- Other: 10

Best results in major championships
- Masters Tournament: DNP
- PGA Championship: DNP
- U.S. Open: DNP
- The Open Championship: CUT: 2000

Achievements and awards
- Asian PGA Tour Order of Merit winner: 1999
- Asian PGA Tour Players' Player of the Year: 1999

Kyi Hla Han (Burmese: ကြည်လှဟန်, pronounced [tɕì l̥a̰ hàɰ̃]; 13 February 1961 – 19 February 2022) was a professional golfer from Myanmar who served as executive chairman of the Asian Tour.

== Career ==
In 1980, Han turned professional. In 1982, he finished runner-up to Payne Stewart at the Resch's Pilsner Tweed Classic, an event on the PGA Tour of Australia, defeating Greg Norman by several shots.

He recorded his first professional wins in 1983 at the Malaysian Dunlop Masters and the Malaysian PGA Championship. He played on the Asian Tour from its debut season in 1995 until 2004. In 1999, he was the top money winner on the tour and that year he collected his only win in an official money Asian Tour tournament at the Volvo China Open.

In 2006, Han was appointed Chairman of the Asian Tour, upon the tour having been reconstituted in 2004 after having been taken over by the players themselves. He is given credit for having overseen the rapid growth of the Asian Tour.

== Death ==
Han died in Singapore on 19 February 2022, at the age of 61.

== Awards and honors ==
- In 1999, Han won the Asian Tour Order of Merit
- In 1999, Han was voted by fellow players as the Asian Tour Player of the Year

== Professional wins (12) ==
=== Asian PGA Tour wins (1) ===
No.	Date	Tournament	Winning score	Margin of victory	Runner-up
1	23 May 1999	Volvo China Open	−15 (68-70-67-68=273)	7 strokes	(United States) Christian Peña

Asian PGA Tour playoff record (0–1)

No.	Year	Tournament	Opponent	Result
1	1999	Maekyung Daks Open	(South Africa) James Kingston	Lost to birdie on fourth extra hole

=== Asia Golf Circuit wins (1) ===
No.	Date	Tournament	Winning score	Margin of victory	Runners-up
1	23 Mar 1997	Rolex Masters	−20 (67-68-65-68=268)	2 strokes	(England) Ed Fryatt, (Taiwan) Yeh Chang-ting

Asia Golf Circuit playoff record (0–1)

No.	Year	Tournament	Opponent	Result
1	1994	Sabah Masters	(United States) Craig McClellan	Lost to birdie on second extra hole

=== PGA Tour of Australasia wins (1) ===
No.	Date	Tournament	Winning score	Margin of victory	Runner-up
1	30 Oct 1994	Epson Singapore Open	−13 (67-69-68-71=275)	1 stroke	(Australia) Wayne Grady

=== Other wins (9) ===
- 1983 Malaysian Dunlop Masters, Malaysian PGA Championship
- 1984 Malaysian Dunlop Masters
- 1985 Malaysian PGA Championship
- 1989 Thai PGA Championship
- 1993 Hong Kong PGA Championship
- 1994 Hong Kong PGA Championship, Johor Masters (Malaysia)
- 2003 Nations Cup (with Aung Win)

== Results in major championships ==
Tournament	2000
The Open Championship	CUT

CUT = missed the half-way cut
Note: Han only played in The Open Championship.

== Results in World Golf Championships ==
Tournament	2000
Match Play	
Championship	52
Invitational	

Did not play

== Team appearances ==
- World Cup (representing Burma/Myanmar): 1980, 1999, 2002, 2003, 2004
