= Hal Underwood =

American golfer (born 1945)

Personal information
- Full name: Hal Mac Underwood
- Nationality: United States
- Born: November 9, 1945 (age 80) Ballinger, Texas, U.S.

Career
- Sport: Golf
- College: University of Houston
- Status: Professional
- Former tours: PGA Tour; European Tour
- Professional wins: 3

Number of wins by tour
- European Tour: 1
- PGA Tour of Australasia: 2

Hal Mac Underwood (born November 9, 1945) is an American professional golfer.

== Amateur career ==
Underwood played college golf at the University of Houston. He played on two NCAA Championship teams (1966 and 1967), was an All-American in 1966 and 1967, and won several college tournaments.

== Professional career ==
Underwood never won on the PGA Tour but finished runner-up to Gary Player in the 1971 Greater Jacksonville Open. He had a little more success internationally, winning the 1975 Portuguese Open on the European Tour and the two events on the Australian/New Zealand circuit. He also recorded a runner-up at the 1977 Malaysian Dunlop Masters.

== Awards and honors ==
In 1991, Underwood was inducted into the Texas Golf Hall of Fame.

== Amateur wins ==
- 1967 Eastern Amateur, Trans-Mississippi Amateur

== Professional wins (3) ==
=== European Tour wins (1) ===
No.	Date	Tournament	Winning score	Margin of victory	Runner-up
1	Apr 11, 1975	Portuguese Open	E (73-72-71-76=292)	3 strokes	(Argentina) Vicente Fernández

=== PGA Tour of Australia wins (1) ===
No.	Date	Tournament	Winning score	Margin of victory	Runners-up
1	Oct 2, 1977	Queensland Open	−7 (71-69-71-70=281)	2 strokes	(Australia) Mike Ferguson, (Australia) Peter Headland

=== New Zealand Golf Circuit wins (1) ===
No.	Date	Tournament	Winning score	Margin of victory	Runner-up
1	Nov 30, 1975	Otago Charity Classic	−6 (67-73-72-70=282)	Playoff	(United States) Bob Clark

New Zealand Golf Circuit playoff record (1–0)

No.	Year	Tournament	Opponent	Result
1	1975	Otago Charity Classic	(United States) Bob Clark	Won with par on first extra hole

== Playoff record ==
PGA Tour playoff record (0–1)

No.	Year	Tournament	Opponent	Result
1	1971	Greater Jacksonville Open	(South Africa) Gary Player	Lost to par on second extra hole

== See also ==
- Spring 1969 PGA Tour Qualifying School graduates
