= Bill Brask =

American professional golfer (born 1946)

Personal information
- Full name: William Jennings Brask Jr.
- Nationality: United States
- Born: December 12, 1946 (age 79) Annapolis, Maryland, U.S.
- Height: 5 ft 10 in (1.78 m)
- Weight: 209 lb (95 kg; 14.9 st)

Career
- Sport: Golf
- College: University of Minnesota
- Turned professional: 1969
- Former tours: PGA Tour; PGA Tour of Australasia; New Zealand Golf Circuit; Senior PGA Tour; European Seniors Tour
- Professional wins: 11

Number of wins by tour
- Sunshine Tour: 1
- PGA Tour of Australasia: 3
- Other: 7

Best results in major championships
- Masters Tournament: DNP
- PGA Championship: DNP
- U.S. Open: T57: 1978
- The Open Championship: T38: 1980

Achievements and awards
- New Zealand Golf Circuit money list winner: 1975–76

William Jennings Brask Jr. (born December 12, 1946) is an American professional golfer. Although he did not have much success on the PGA Tour he won a number of minor international tournaments. Due to this success overseas – where they used a smaller golf ball – he was referred to as "the king of the small ball" by Lee Trevino.

== Early life ==
Brask grew up in San Diego, California. He attended the University of Minnesota for college and played on the golf team. He was an All-American in 1967 and 1968. He won the Big Ten Championship in 1968 and finished third in the 1968 NCAA Championships.

== Professional career ==
Brask successfully got through PGA Tour Qualifying School and played full-time on tour in 1970. He was paired with Arnold Palmer at the first event of the year, the Los Angeles Open. Despite being "nervous as a cat" he played relatively well, finishing T-24. He would record five more top-25s on tour in 1970 and kept his card. In 1971, he made the cut in 7 of his 14 PGA Tour events but with no high finishes he lost his card. He would not play full-time on the PGA Tour again.

Brask would have much better luck overseas. At the 1970 Dunlop International in Canberra, Australia he was tied for the lead in the final round and ultimately finished a shot back of Gary Player. He tied Lee Trevino and Kel Nagle for second. Brask was elated with his performance, stating "I'm so excited it is just like winning." Later in the month he recorded a solo fourth at New Zealand's Caltex Tournament, three behind. Four years later he won his first professional event at the Western Province Open on the South African Tour with a score of 280 (−4).

Brask would have great success during the PGA Tour of Australia's 1975 season. In October he finished solo 4th at the New South Wales Open. His first victory down under was in November 1975, winning the New Zealand Airlines Classic by a shot over Peter Thomson and four shots over Tom Kite who finished 3rd. At the New Zealand Open he and fellow American Bruce Fleisher finished four shots back to Australian Bill Dunk. At the Australian Open he finished runner-up, three shots back of American Jack Nicklaus. This extraordinary play down under would help Brask a second place finish on the 1975 Australian Tour's Order of Merit.

This good play continued in 1976. On January 1, 1976 Brask fired a nine-under-par 61 at the opening round of the New Zealand PGA Championship. He held the lead through much of the tournament but New Zealand's John Lister caught him at the end of regulation. Lister would defeat Brask in a playoff. Later in the month, he recorded a third place finish at the BP South African Open, three out of a playoff. Much later in the year he finished a distant runner-up to Bob Shearer in defense of his New Zealand Airlines Classic title.

His good international continued through the 1970s. He also seriously contended at the European Tour's 1977 Callers of Newcastle tournament, finishing two out of a playoff. Brask won the South Seas Classic in Fiji in September 1977, five shots ahead of Guy Wolstenholme. In March 1978 he won the Indian Open, shooting a final round 67 to defeat defending champion Brian Jones, Taiwan's Kuo Chie-Hsiung, and Australia's Stewart Ginn by four shots. Brask out-shot the trio of second-place finishers by 9 shots over the final round. Three months later he was on the first page of the U.S. Open leaderboard. Brask shot an opening round 71 (E) to find himself in a tie for 5th, two back of Hale Irwin. He stumbled with a second round 76, however, and was not near the lead after that.

In 1978, with his touring career largely over, Brask took a job at Pauma Valley Country Club in San Diego. He moved back to Minnesota in 1980 and worked at Olympic Hills Golf Course until 1998. In the winter, however, he continued to play overseas. He finished runner-up at the 1983 Singapore Open, losing in a playoff to Taiwan's Lu Chien-soon. A year later he won the Hong Kong Open over defending champion Greg Norman. After 1985 season, however, he would only record one more top-10 in an official regular event.

In 1998, shortly after during 50, Brask gave up his job at Olympic Hills to compete on the European Seniors Tour. In 1999 he had his three runner-up finishes in 16 events. He also played full-time on the Senior PGA Tour in the United States from 2000 to 2002. His best finish was a runner-up to Larry Nelson at the Bank One Senior Championship in 2000.

In 2002 he returned to Minnesota to work at Edina Country Club. As of 2018, he still works there.

== Professional wins (11) ==
=== Asia Golf Circuit wins (2) ===
No.	Date	Tournament	Winning score	Margin of victory	Runner(s)-up
1	Mar 12, 1978	Indian Open	−8 (69-73-75-67=284)	4 strokes	(Australia) Stewart Ginn, (Australia) Brian Jones, (Taiwan) Kuo Chie-Hsiung
2	Feb 26, 1984	Cathay Pacific Hong Kong Open	−12 (66-64-68-70=268)	7 strokes	(Australia) Greg Norman

Asia Golf Circuit playoff record (0–1)

No.	Year	Tournament	Opponent	Result
1	1983	Singapore Open	(Taiwan) Lu Chien-soon	Lost to birdie on second extra hole

=== Southern Africa Tour wins (1) ===
No.	Date	Tournament	Winning score	Margin of victory	Runners-up
1	Nov 30, 1974	NCR Western Province Open	−4 (70-73-68-69=280)	1 stroke	(South Africa) John Fourie, (South Africa) Allan Henning

=== New Zealand Golf Circuit wins (2) ===
No.	Date	Tournament	Winning score	Margin of victory	Runner-up
1	Nov 16, 1975	New Zealand Airlines Classic	−8 (70-68-67-71=276)	1 stroke	(Australia) Peter Thomson
2	Dec 14, 1975	Southland Charity Golf Classic	−4 (71-67-72-74=284)	4 strokes	(Australia) Geoff Parslow

New Zealand Golf Circuit playoff record (0–1)

No.	Year	Tournament	Opponent	Result
1	1976	New Zealand PGA Championship	(New Zealand) John Lister	Lost to par on second extra hole

=== Other wins (6) ===
- 1976 California State Open
- 1977 Gilbey's Gin South Seas Classic
- 1978 Air New Zealand Fiji Open
- 1983 Minnesota PGA Championship
- 1985 Minnesota PGA Championship
- 1987 Minnesota PGA Championship

== Results in major championships ==
Tournament	1973	1974	1975	1976	1977	1978	1979	1980
U.S. Open	CUT	CUT				T57		
The Open Championship			T47	CUT				T38

Note: Brask only played in The U.S. Open and The Open Championship.

Did not play

CUT = missed the half-way cut (3rd round cut in 1976 Open Championship)
"T" indicates a tie for a place

== Team appearances ==
- Praia d'El Rey European Cup: 1999

== See also ==
- Fall 1969 PGA Tour Qualifying School graduates
- Spring 1976 PGA Tour Qualifying School graduates
