= Bob Charles (golfer) =

New Zealand professional golfer (born 1936)

Sir Bob Charles ONZ KNZM CBE
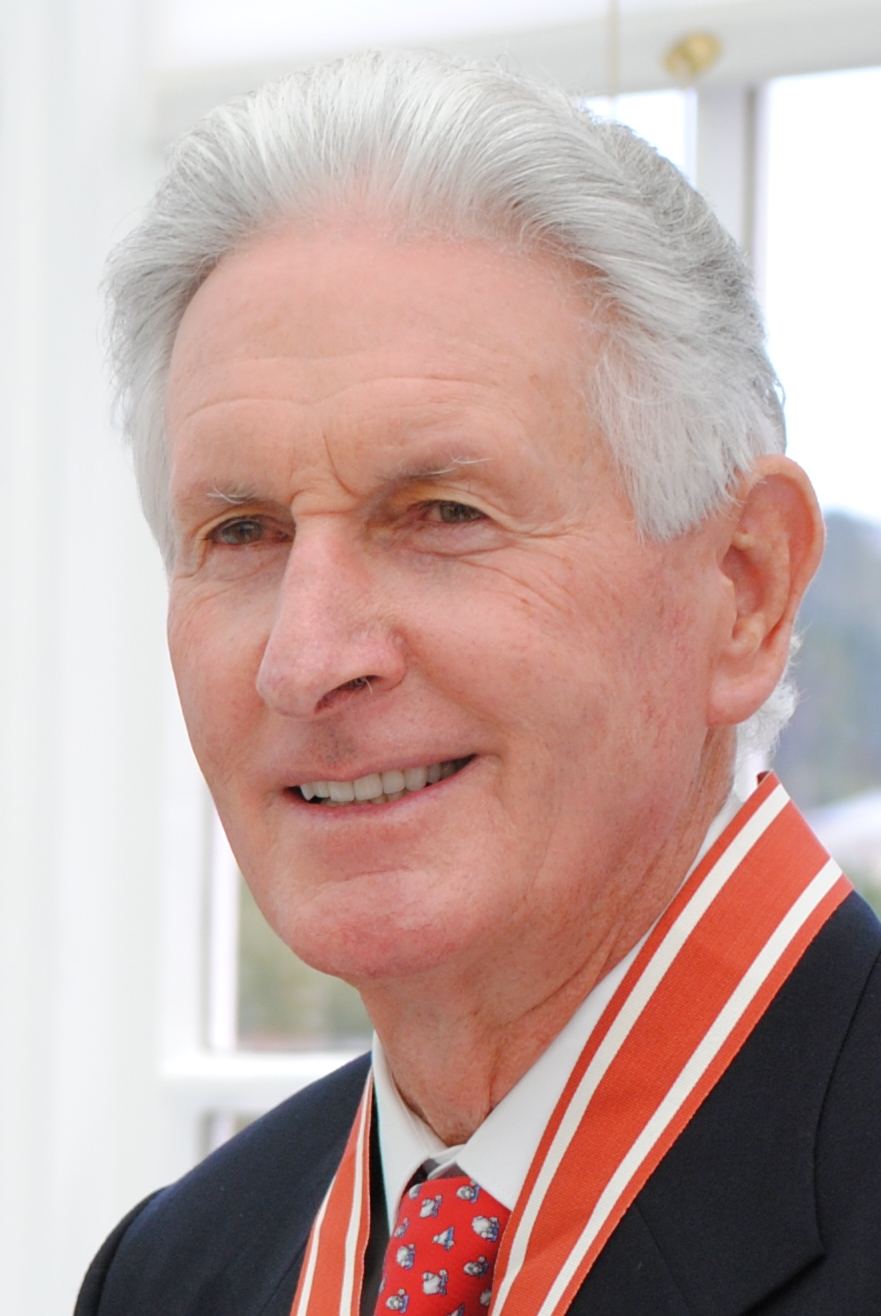
- Charles in 2011

Personal information
- Full name: Robert James Charles
- Nationality: New Zealand
- Born: 14 March 1936 (age 90) Carterton, New Zealand
- Height: 1.85 m (6 ft 1 in)
- Weight: 79 kg (174 lb; 12.4 st)
- Spouse: Verity Aldridge (m. 1962)
- Children: 2

Career
- Sport: Golf
- Turned professional: 1960
- Former tours: PGA Tour; European Tour; PGA Tour of Australia; New Zealand Golf Circuit; Champions Tour; European Seniors Tour
- Professional wins: 80

Number of wins by tour
- PGA Tour: 6
- European Tour: 4
- PGA Tour Champions: 25 (Tied-4th all-time)
- European Senior Tour: 1
- Other: 32 (regular); 13 (senior)

Best results in major championships (wins: 1)
- Masters Tournament: T15: 1963
- PGA Championship: T2: 1968
- U.S. Open: 3rd/T3: 1964, 1970
- The Open Championship: Won: 1963

Achievements and awards
- World Golf Hall of Fame: 2008 (member page)
- New Zealand Golf Circuit money list winner: 1966, 1967, 1968–69, 1971–72, 1973–74, 1978–79
- Senior PGA Tour money list winner: 1988, 1989
- Senior PGA Tour Byron Nelson Award: 1988, 1989, 1993

Sir Robert James Charles (born 14 March 1936) is a New Zealand professional golfer who won the 1963 Open Championship, the first left-handed player to win a major championship. He won the 1954 New Zealand Open as an 18-year-old amateur and made the cut in the same event in 2007, at the age of 71. His achievements over that period, in which he won 80 tournaments, rank him as one of the most successful New Zealand golfers of all time. Along with Michael Campbell and Ryan Fox, he is one of only three New Zealanders to win a men's major golf championship.

Charles turned professional in late 1960 and for the next two years had some success in tournaments around the world. From 1963 until the mid-1970s he played mostly on the PGA Tour. He won five times on the tour and finished in the top-60 on the money list each year from 1963 to 1971, except 1966, and again in 1974. Later he played more on the European Tour before joining the Senior PGA Tour when he reached 50. He was very successful on the Senior PGA Tour with 23 titles between 1987 and 1996, and winning over $9 million between 1986 and 2008. In Britain, Charles won the 1963 Open Championship and the Senior British Open twice, in 1989 and 1993. These were later added as official wins on the PGA Tour and the Senior PGA Tour. In addition to his PGA Tour and the Senior PGA Tour wins, Charles won nine times in Europe, including the 1969 Piccadilly World Match Play Championship, and 25 times in domestic New Zealand tournaments. He also won a number of other seniors events around the world, including in South Africa, Japan and Australia.

== Early life ==
Born in Carterton, a small town in the Wairarapa district in New Zealand's North Island, Charles lived in Masterton, where he worked as a bank teller, before moving to Christchurch in mid-1956.

== Amateur career ==
Charles came to prominence when he won the New Zealand Open at Wellington Golf Club in November 1954, as an 18-year-old amateur, finishing two strokes ahead of Bruce Crampton and four ahead of Peter Thomson. The event acted as qualification for the New Zealand Amateur which followed immediately after the Open. Charles reached the final but lost 3&2 to Tim Woon, the defending champion, in the 36 hole match. Charles also reached the final of the New Zealand Amateur in October 1956 at Christchurch Golf Club, but lost again, 3&2 to the Tasmanian Peter Toogood. In September 1956 Charles had been a member of the 4-man New Zealand team in the Sloan Morpeth Trophy match against Australia at Wanganui. Australia won the contest but Charles won his singles match.

Charles left New Zealand in January 1958 for a tour of the United States and Britain, travelling with Ian Cromb, and returning in August. They spent the early part of year in America, playing in a number of professional events, ending with the Masters for which Charles had received an invitation. He missed the cut by 8 strokes after rounds of 77 and 80. In Britain, he also played in some professional tournaments. Charles reached the quarter-finals of the Amateur Championship on the Old Course at St Andrews, before losing to Alan Thirlwell, and later finished tied for 9th place in the Brabazon Trophy at Royal Birkdale. He also played in the 1958 Open Championship at Royal Lytham where he qualified after rounds of 74 and 73. He started well in the Championship with a 71 but missed the cut after a second round 79.

Charles was selected for the 4-man New Zealand team for the inaugural Eisenhower Trophy competition on the Old Course at St Andrews in October 1958. New Zealand led by three strokes after 3 of the 4 rounds. However a poor last day left then in fourth place. John Durry took 83, including a 10 at the 14th hole. Charles took 81 and with three of the four scores counting, New Zealand finished three strokes behind the leaders. Despite his poor last round Charles had the best four-round aggregate among the New Zealand team.

Charles played in the 1959 Commonwealth Tournament in Johannesburg. New Zealand finished third of the five teams. Charles was the best of the team with three wins in foursomes matches and three wins in the singles, losing only in the match against South Africa. Charles also played in the 1960 Eisenhower Trophy in the United States. The contest was dominated by the Americans who won by 42 strokes. New Zealand finished fifth, with Charles again the best of the team.

== Professional career ==
In October 1960, Charles turned professional. Soon after turning professional, Charles won a 36-hole event at Queens Park, Invercargill, eight strokes ahead of Kel Nagle. Although he disappointed in the New Zealand Open, he reached the final of the New Zealand PGA Championship losing 5&4 to Nagle. In early 1961, Charles played on the South African circuit. Had a number of good finishes and was runner-up in the Dunlop South African Masters behind Denis Hutchinson. Charles then travelled to Europe. He won the 36-hole Bowmaker Tournament, two strokes ahead of Hutchinson and Nagle, and had a number of top finishes including a tied for 4th place in the Martini International. He led the qualifiers for the 1961 Open Championship at Royal Birkdale after rounds of 66 and 70. He started with a 72 but missed the cut after a second round 84, played in difficult conditions. Returning to New Zealand, in October he won the Caltex Tournament, by 4 strokes from Nagle, and then the New Zealand PGA Championship.

Charles played on the 1962 Far East Circuit in February and March. His best performance with joint runner-up in the Malayan Open behind Frank Phillips. He received an invitation for the 1962 Masters Tournament in April. He made the cut and tied for 25th place. Charles then travelled to Europe to play in the British/Irish and Continental circuits, where he had considerable success. He finished third in the Martini International at St Andrews and tied for the win, with Dai Rees, in the Daks Tournament. In the 1962 Open Championship he finished in 5th place, although a distant 14 strokes behind the winner, Arnold Palmer. He was then joint runner-up in the French Open, runner-up in the Irish Hospitals Tournament and joint runner-up in the Royal Gold Tournament, a 12-man round-robin tournament. Returning to the continent he won the Engadine Open in Switzerland, lost a playoff to Max Faulkner in the Woodlawn International Invitational in West Germany, and won the Swiss Open in successive weeks. Returning to New Zealand, he again won the Caltex Tournament ahead of Kel Nagle. Towards the end of the year he played in the Australian Open, finishing tied for third, and then played in the 1962 Canada Cup in Argentina.

From 1963, Charles played mostly on the American PGA Tour. He won his first PGA Tour event in April 1963, the Houston Classic, the first PGA Tour event won by a left-handed golfer. He had three other top-5 finishes and finished the year 27th in the money list with $23,636. In late June he travelled to Britain and was third in the Dunlop Masters. Two weeks later, he won The Open Championship at Royal Lytham and St. Annes. After four rounds (68-72-66-71) his 277 was level with American Phil Rodgers. Charles won the 36-hole playoff by eight shots. Later in the year he played on the New Zealand Golf Circuit, winning the Wattie's Tournament, and competing in the 1963 Canada Cup in Paris.

Charles didn't win on the 1964 PGA Tour but had five top-5 finishes, including a third place finish at the U.S. Open. He finished 17th in the official money list with $28,451. He played relatively few other event but did defend his Open Championship title, finishing tied for 17th, and he played in the Canada Cup in Hawaii. Charles made a good start to the 1965 season. He lost in a playoff for the Lucky International Open, won the Tucson Open and was a runner-up in the Jacksonville Open. Later in the season he had less success and finished 34th in the money list with $28,360. Later in the year he played in some events in Europe, including the Canada Cup in Madrid, and in New Zealand, where he was a runner-up in the New Zealand Open. Charles had a very poor season on the 1966 PGA Tour. His only top-10 finish came towards the end of the season and he only won $8,472, to finish 87th in the official money list. He showed a return to form late in the year, playing well at the 1966 Canada Cup in Japan, and winning four events out of seven on the New Zealand Golf Circuit, including the New Zealand Open which he won by 13 strokes.

Charles showed a return to form in 1967, with eight top-10 finishes on the 1967 PGA Tour, including winning the Atlanta Classic. He finished 11th in the money list with $72,468. He played in the 1967 World Cup in Mexico, the New Zealand pair finishing second behind the United States with Charles finishing joint runner-up in the individual standings, level with Jack Nicklaus and behind Arnold Palmer. He again played on the New Zealand circuit towards the end of year, winning three events, and again being the leading money winner. Charles had another successful season on the 1968 PGA Tour, with a win in the Canadian Open, and six other top-10s in official events. He finished 18th in the money list with $70,926. Two of his top-10 finishes came in the U.S. Open and the PGA Championship, and he also finished a joint runner-up in the Open Championship. He made his debut in the Piccadilly World Match Play Championship, losing in the final to Gary Player. He played in the 1968 World Cup in Italy, where the New Zealand pair finished seventh. He had three more tournament wins on the 1968–69 New Zealand circuit, including the Spalding Masters which he won by 10 strokes with a score of 260.

Charles didn't win on the PGA in 1969, 1970 or 1971 but continued to have a number of high finishes including 11 top-10 finishes in 1969, 9 in 1970 and 8 in 1971. He finished 30th in money list in 1969 with $59,734, 25th in 1970 with $70,854 and 41st in 1971 with $58,016. Charles won the 1969 Piccadilly World Match Play Championship beating Gene Littler with an eagle at the 37th hole in the final. He lost in playoff for the 1970 Greater New Orleans Open. He had more tournament wins on the New Zealand Golf Circuit, the New Zealand Open in late 1970 and three in the 1971–72 season.

1972 and 1973 were relatively poor years on the PGA Tour with just one top-10 finish each season. He finished 97th in the money list in 1972 with $21,809, and 108th in 1973 with $19,499. Despite his lack of success in America, he won a number of tournaments around the world. He won the John Player Classic and the Dunlop Masters on the 1972 European Tour and the Scandinavian Enterprise Open on the tour in 1973. He won the South African Open in early 1973 and the City of Auckland Classic and the New Zealand Open at the end of the year. In 1972 he made his final appearance in the World Cup in Australia. Charles had a better year on the 1974 PGA Tour, winning the Greater Greensboro Open and having three other top-10 finishes. He finished 36th in the money list with $65,226, although $44,000 of that came from his win. He also won the 1974 Swiss Open.

After his relatively successful season on the 1974 PGA Tour, Charles had poor 1975 and 1976 seasons winning $7,226 and $3,769. From 1977 he only played a few events on the tour, leaving the tour in 1984. In 1983 he won the Tallahassee Open, an event on the Tournament Players Series. From 1977 to 1985 he played more frequently on the European Tour. His best year was 1978 when he finished 14th in the Order of Merit. He didn't win on the tour in this period but was runner-up in the 1977 Benson and Hedges International Open, the 1978 Greater Manchester Open and the 1982 Benson and Hedges International Open. Charles also won three events on the New Zealand Golf Circuit, the Air New Zealand Shell Open in late 1978 and the New Zealand PGA Championship in early 1979 and in early 1980.

In 2007, at the age of 71, Charles became the oldest golfer to make the cut in a European Tour event, at the Michael Hill New Zealand Open. Charles shot a 68 in the second round, beating his age by three strokes. He had a final round 70 to finish in a tie for 23rd place.

=== Senior golf ===
Charles's played on the Senior PGA Tour (now called PGA Tour Champions) after turning 50. He was very successful on the tour with 23 titles between 1987 and 1996, and winning over $9 million on the tour between 1986 and 2008. He was the leading money winner in 1988 and 1989 and led the scoring average in 1988, 1989 and 1993. He won the Senior British Open in 1989 and 1993. From 2002 the Senior British Open was an official event on the PGA Tour Champions but it was only in 2018 that earlier wins were recognised by the PGA Tour Champions as official wins on the tour, increasing Charles's total to 25.

Charles was a regular competitor in the Senior British Open from its founding in 1987. As well as winning twice, he was a runner-up 6 times between 1987 and 2001. During this period he rarely played in European Seniors Tour events but as he had less success in America he played more in European tournaments. Apart from his Senior British Open wins he never won a European senior event, although he finished runner-up in the 2007 Wentworth Senior Masters at the age of 71. In addition to his senior wins in America, Charles won a number of other senior events around the world, including South Africa, Japan and Australia.

=== Golfing awards ===
Charles was the first left-handed golfer to be inducted into the World Golf Hall of Fame, in the veterans category. He was inducted in 2008.

== Personal life ==
In December 1962, Charles married Verity Joan Aldridge in Johannesburg, South Africa. They met three years previously at the Commonwealth Golf tournament when it was held in South Africa. The golfers Denis Hutchinson and Bobby Verwey served as groomsmen. They had two children, Beverly and David. David is a golf director in the United States. He is a successful golf course designer having had major input into the Formosa Country Club east of Auckland, Millbrook at the resort town of Queenstown, and The Dunes course at Matarangi on the Coromandel Peninsula. He was also consultant to the Clearwater course, near Christchurch, designed by golf architect John Darby.

Although Charles plays golf left-handed, he is naturally right-handed.

== Awards and honors ==
- In the 1971 Queen's Birthday Honours, Charles was appointed an Officer of the Order of the British Empire, for services to sport.
- In the 1992 New Year Honours, he was promoted to Commander of the Order of the British Empire, for services to golf.
- In the 1999 New Year Honours, Charles was appointed a Knight Companion of the New Zealand Order of Merit, for services to golf.
- In the 2011 New Year Honours, Charles was appointed as a Member of the Order of New Zealand, New Zealand's highest civilian honour, for services to New Zealand.

== Professional wins (80) ==
=== PGA Tour wins (6) ===
Legend
Major championships (1)
Other PGA Tour (5)

No.	Date	Tournament	Winning score	Margin of victory	Runner(s)-up
1	21 Apr 1963	Houston Classic	−12 (67-66-66-69=268)	1 stroke	(United States) Fred Hawkins
2	13 Jul 1963	The Open Championship	−3 (68-72-66-71=277)	Playoff	(United States) Phil Rodgers
3	21 Feb 1965	Tucson Open Invitational	−17 (65-69-67-70=271)	4 strokes	(United States) Al Geiberger
4	1 Oct 1967	Atlanta Classic	−6 (72-71-69-70=282)	2 strokes	(United States) Tommy Bolt, (United States) Richard Crawford, (United States) Gardner Dickinson
5	23 Jun 1968	Canadian Open	−6 (70-68-70-66=274)	2 strokes	(United States) Jack Nicklaus
6	7 Apr 1974	Greater Greensboro Open	−14 (65-70-67-68=270)	1 stroke	(United States) Raymond Floyd, (United States) Lee Trevino

PGA Tour playoff record (1–2)

No.	Year	Tournament	Opponent(s)	Result
1	1963	The Open Championship	(United States) Phil Rodgers	Won 36-hole playoff; Charles: E (69-71=140), Rodgers: +8 (72-76=148)
2	1965	Lucky International Open	(United States) George Archer	Lost to birdie on second extra hole
3	1970	Greater New Orleans Open	(United States) Miller Barber, (United States) Howie Johnson	Barber won with birdie on second extra hole

=== European Tour wins (4) ===
No.	Date	Tournament	Winning score	Margin of victory	Runner(s)-up
1	30 Sep 1972	John Player Classic	+1 (69-69-71-76=285)	1 stroke	(United States) Gay Brewer, (England) Peter Oosterhuis
2	7 Oct 1972	Dunlop Masters	−11 (70-68-71-68=277)	2 strokes	(England) Tony Jacklin
3	22 Jul 1973	Scandinavian Enterprise Open	−10 (69-69-70-70=278)	2 strokes	(South Africa) Vin Baker, (England) Tony Jacklin, (England) Hedley Muscroft
4	27 Jul 1974	Swiss Open	−5 (70-70-67-68=275)	1 stroke	(England) Tony Jacklin

European Tour playoff record (0–1)

No.	Year	Tournament	Opponents	Result
1	1978	Greater Manchester Open	(Scotland) Brian Barnes, (England) Denis Durnian, (England) Nick Job	Barnes won with birdie on first extra hole

=== Southern Africa Tour wins (1) ===
No.	Date	Tournament	Winning score	Margin of victory	Runners-up
1	3 Feb 1973	BP South African Open	−6 (73-67-72-70=282)	3 strokes	(South Africa) Vin Baker, (South Africa) Bobby Cole, (Australia) Graham Marsh

=== New Zealand Golf Circuit wins (20) ===
No.	Date	Tournament	Winning score	Margin of victory	Runner(s)-up
1	17 Sep 1963	Wattie's Tournament	−9 (66-68-67-70=271)	3 strokes	(Australia) Bill Dunk
2	19 Nov 1966	New Zealand Open	−19 (67-71-65-70=273)	13 strokes	(England) Guy Wolstenholme
3	22 Nov 1966	Wattie's Tournament (2)	−15 (67-66-69-63=265)	6 strokes	(England) Tony Jacklin
4	6 Dec 1966	Metalcraft Tournament	−15 (73-69-66-65=273)	3 strokes	(England) Clive Clark
5	11 Dec 1966	Forest Products Tournament	−16 (72-68-66-66=272)	Shared title with (England) Tony Jacklin	
6	21 Nov 1967	Wattie's Tournament (3)	−8 (70-67-68-67=272)	2 strokes	(New Zealand) Stuart Jones (a)
7	26 Nov 1967	Caltex Tournament	−14 (74-67-68-69=278)	Shared title with (Australia) Peter Thomson	
8	2 Dec 1967	New Zealand Wills Masters	−14 (68-69-69-72=278)	Shared title with (Netherlands) Martin Roesink	
9	7 Dec 1968	Caltex Tournament (2)	−16 (65-70-62=197) (Note: Shortened to 36/54 holes due to weather.)	10 strokes	(Australia) Tony Mangan, (Australia) Randall Vines
10	10 Dec 1968	Wattie's Tournament (4)	−6 (68-70-65-71=274)	2 strokes	(New Zealand) Walter Godfrey
11	4 Jan 1969	Spalding Masters	−20 (66-62-69-63=260)	10 strokes	(New Zealand) John Lister
12	28 Nov 1970	New Zealand Open (2)	−13 (65-65-71-70=271)	10 strokes	(Australia) Graham Marsh
13	5 Dec 1971	Otago Charity Classic	−15 (70-67-67-69=273)	6 strokes	(United States) Marty Bohen
14	12 Dec 1971	Caltex Tournament (3)	−10 (68-68-67-71=274)	2 strokes	(England) Guy Wolstenholme
15	1 Jan 1972	Spalding Masters (2)	−10 (67-68-65=200)	2 strokes	(England) Guy Wolstenholme
16	18 Nov 1973	City of Auckland Classic	−7 (69-66-71=206)	1 stroke	(New Zealand) Walter Godfrey
17	25 Nov 1973	New Zealand Open (3)	−5 (72-69-73-69=283)	4 strokes	(Australia) Ian Stanley
18	3 Dec 1978	Air New Zealand Shell Open	−7 (72-69-73-69=273)	1 stroke	(Australia) Graham Marsh
19	2 Jan 1979	New Zealand PGA Championship	−3 (72-67-67-71=277)	3 strokes	(England) Guy Wolstenholme
20	2 Jan 1980	New Zealand PGA Championship (2)	−19 (67-63-64-67=261)	6 strokes	(Australia) Rodger Davis

New Zealand Golf Circuit playoff record (0–1)

No.	Year	Tournament	Opponents	Result
1	1974	New Zealand Open	(United States) Bob Gilder, (Australia) Jack Newton	Gilder won with birdie on third extra hole Newton eliminated by par on second hole

=== Tournament Players Series wins (1) ===
No.	Date	Tournament	Winning score	Margin of victory	Runner-up
1	24 Apr 1983	Tallahassee Open	−6 (74-68-67-73=282)	Playoff	(United States) Greg Powers

Tournament Players Series playoff record (1–0)

No.	Year	Tournament	Opponent	Result
1	1983	Tallahassee Open	(United States) Greg Powers	Won with birdie on first extra hole

=== Other European wins (6) ===
Date	Tournament	Winning score	Margin of victory	Runner(s)-up	Ref.
27 Jun 1961	Bowmaker Tournament	66-66=132	2 strokes	(South Africa) Denis Hutchinson, (Australia) Kel Nagle	
9 Jun 1962	Daks Tournament	68-68-72-70=278	Tied	(Wales) Dai Rees	
19 Aug 1962	Engadine Open	?-?-72-66=271	1 stroke	(South Africa) Bobby Verwey	
1 Sep 1962	Swiss Open	71-67-67-67=272	Playoff	(England) Peter Butler, (Belgium) Flory Van Donck	
13 Jul 1963	The Open Championship	68-72-66-71=277	Playoff	(United States) Phil Rodgers	
11 Oct 1969	Piccadilly World Match Play Championship	37 holes		(United States) Gene Littler	

=== Other New Zealand wins (5) ===
Date	Tournament	Winning score	Margin of victory	Runner-up	Ref.
6 Nov 1954	New Zealand Open (as an amateur)	69-72-68-71=280	2 strokes	(Australia) Bruce Crampton	
20 Nov 1960	Queens Park Invitation	66-67=133	8 strokes	(Australia) Kel Nagle	
7 Oct 1961	Caltex Tournament	71-71-72-75=289	4 strokes	(Australia) Kel Nagle	
18 Oct 1961	New Zealand PGA Championship	10 and 9		(New Zealand) Joe Paterson	
20 Oct 1962	Caltex Tournament	69-70-69-69=277	5 strokes	(Australia) Kel Nagle	

=== Senior PGA Tour wins (25) ===
Legend
Senior major championships (2)
Other Senior PGA Tour (23)

No.	Date	Tournament	Winning score	Margin of victory	Runner(s)-up
1	22 Mar 1987	Vintage Chrysler Invitational	−3 (72-70-73-70=285)	4 strokes	(United States) Butch Baird, (Australia) Bruce Crampton, (United States) Dale Douglass, (United States) Howie Johnson, (United States) Bobby Nichols, (South Africa) Gary Player, (United States) Chi-Chi Rodríguez
2	29 Mar 1987	GTE Classic	−8 (67-67-74=208)	4 strokes	(Australia) Bruce Crampton
3	3 May 1987	Sunwest Bank Charley Pride Senior Golf Classic	−8 (70-70-68=208)	1 stroke	(United States) Dale Douglass
4	22 May 1988	NYNEX/Golf Digest Commemorative	−14 (63-67-66=196)	4 strokes	(South Africa) Harold Henning, (United States) Don Massengale
5	29 May 1988	Sunwest Bank Charley Pride Senior Golf Classic (2)	−10 (69-68-69=206)	2 strokes	(United States) Orville Moody
6	4 Jul 1988	Rancho Murieta Senior Gold Rush	−9 (69-69-69=207)	2 strokes	(South Africa) Gary Player
7	28 Aug 1988	Bank One Senior Golf Classic	−10 (63-66-71=200)	1 stroke	(United States) Dick Hendrickson
8	2 Oct 1988	Pepsi Senior Challenge	−5 (70-69=139)	1 stroke	(United States) Dick Hendrickson, (South Africa) Harold Henning, (United States) Bert Yancey
9	19 Feb 1989	GTE Suncoast Classic	−9 (68-70-69=207)	Playoff	(United States) Jim Ferree, (United States) Dave Hill, (South Africa) Harold Henning
10	21 May 1989	NYNEX/Golf Digest Commemorative (2)	−17 (63-65-65=193)	5 strokes	(United States) Don Bies, (Australia) Bruce Crampton
11	9 Jul 1989	Digital Seniors Classic	-16 (65-70-65=200)	3 strokes	(United States) Mike Hill
12	30 Jul 1989	Volvo Seniors' British Open	−11 (70-68-65-66=269)	7 strokes	(United States) Billy Casper
13	27 Aug 1989	Sunwest Bank Charley Pride Senior Golf Classic (3)	−13 (66-69-68=203)	1 stroke	(United States) Charles Coody
14	1 Oct 1989	Fairfield Barnett Space Coast Classic	−13 (66-70-67=203)	6 strokes	(United States) Butch Baird
15	24 Jun 1990	Digital Seniors Classic (2)	−13 (69-67-67=203)	2 strokes	(United States) Lee Trevino
16	9 Dec 1990	GTE Kaanapali Classic	−4 (65-71-70=206)	4 strokes	(United States) George Archer, (United States) Lee Trevino
17	10 Feb 1991	GTE Suncoast Classic (2)	−6 (68-72-70=210)	4 strokes	(United States) George Archer, (United States) Lee Trevino
18	11 Oct 1992	Raley's Senior Gold Rush (2)	−15 (71-65-65=201)	7 strokes	(South Africa) Gary Player, (United States) Chi-Chi Rodríguez
19	18 Oct 1992	Transamerica Senior Golf Championship	−16 (70-67-63=200)	1 stroke	(United States) Dave Stockton
20	28 Mar 1993	Doug Sanders Celebrity Classic	−8 (69-70-69=208)	1 stroke	(United States) Jim Ferree
21	23 May 1993	Bell Atlantic Classic	−6 (67-67-70=204)	1 stroke	(United States) Dave Stockton
22	25 Jul 1993	Senior British Open (2)	+3 (73-73-71-74=291)	1 stroke	(England) Tommy Horton, (South Africa) Gary Player
23	5 Sep 1993	Quicksilver Classic	−9 (74-65-68=207)	4 strokes	(United States) Dave Stockton
24	29 Oct 1995	Hyatt Regency Maui Kaanapali Classic (2)	−9 (69-67-68=204)	Playoff	(United States) Dave Stockton
25	27 Oct 1996	Hyatt Regency Maui Kaanapali Classic (3)	−15 (64-65-69=198)	1 stroke	(United States) Hale Irwin

Senior PGA Tour playoff record (2–8)

No.	Year	Tournament	Opponent(s)	Result
1	1987	PaineWebber World Seniors Invitational	(South Africa) Gary Player	Lost to birdie on first extra hole
2	1988	Senior Players Reunion Pro-Am	(United States) Don Massengale, (United States) Orville Moody, (United States) Bobby Nichols	Moody won with birdie on first extra hole
3	1988	U.S. Senior Open	(South Africa) Gary Player	Lost 18-hole playoff; Player: −4 (68), Charles: −2 (70)
4	1989	GTE Suncoast Classic	(United States) Jim Ferree, (United States) Dave Hill, (South Africa) Harold Henning	Won with birdie on third extra hole Ferree and Hill eliminated by birdie on first hole
5	1989	General Tire Las Vegas Classic	(United States) Charles Coody, (United States) Chi-Chi Rodríguez	Coody won with birdie on second extra hole
6	1995	Hyatt Regency Maui Kaanapali Classic	(United States) Dave Stockton	Won with birdie on third extra hole
7	1996	Las Vegas Senior Classic	(United States) Jim Colbert, (United States) Dave Stockton	Colbert won with par on fourth extra hole Charles eliminated by par on first hole
8	1998	Home Depot Invitational	(United States) Jim Dent	Lost to par on third extra hole
9	1998	Kroger Senior Classic	(South Africa) Hugh Baiocchi, (United States) Frank Conner, (United States) Larry Nelson, (United States) Bruce Summerhays	Baiocchi won with birdie on second extra hole
10	2001	Senior British Open	(Australia) Ian Stanley	Lost to par on first extra hole

=== European Seniors Tour wins (1) ===
Legend
Senior major championships (1)
Other European Seniors Tour (0)

No.	Date	Tournament	Winning score	Margin of victory	Runners-up
1	25 Jul 1993	Senior British Open	+3 (73-73-71-74=291)	1 stroke	(England) Tommy Horton, (South Africa) Gary Player

European Seniors Tour playoff record (0–1)

No.	Year	Tournament	Opponent	Result
1	2001	Senior British Open	(Australia) Ian Stanley	Lost to par on first extra hole

=== Other senior wins (13) ===
- 1986 Mazda Champions (with Amy Alcott)
- 1987 Mauna Lani Seniors Challenge
- 1988 First National Bank Seniors Classic, Fuji Electric Grand Slam
- 1989 Fuji Electric Grand Slam
- 1990 Fuji Electric Grand Slam, Kintetsu Home Senior, Daikyo Legends of Golf
- 1991 Kintetsu Home Senior
- 1998 Office Depot Father/Son Challenge (with son David)
- 2004 Liberty Mutual Legends of Golf – Raphael Division (with Stewart Ginn)
- 2009 Liberty Mutual Legends of Golf – Demaret Division (with Gary Player)
- 2010 Liberty Mutual Legends of Golf – Demaret Division (with Gary Player)

== Playoff record ==
PGA Tour of Australia playoff record (0–1)

No.	Year	Tournament	Opponent	Result
1	1981	New Zealand PGA Championship	(Australia) Terry Gale	Lost to birdie on first extra hole

== Major championships ==
=== Wins (1) ===
Year	Championship	54 holes	Winning score	Margin	Runner-up
1963	The Open Championship	1 shot lead	−7 (68-72-66-71=277)	Playoff^{1}	(United States) Phil Rodgers

^{1}Defeated Phil Rodgers in a 36-hole playoff (Charles 69-71=140, Rodgers 72-76=148).

=== Results timeline ===
Amateur

Tournament	1958	1959
Masters Tournament	CUT	
U.S. Open		
The Open Championship	CUT	
The Amateur Championship	QF	

Professional

Tournament	1960	1961	1962	1963	1964	1965	1966	1967	1968	1969
Masters Tournament			T25	T15	T40	T45	CUT	CUT	19	T29
U.S. Open				T19	3	CUT	CUT	CUT	T7	CUT
The Open Championship		CUT	5	1	T17	CUT	T37	CUT	T2	2
PGA Championship				T13	T19	T41			T2	T35

Tournament	1970	1971	1972	1973	1974	1975	1976	1977	1978	1979
Masters Tournament	17	CUT	T22	T29	CUT	CUT				
U.S. Open	T3	T13	CUT	11	CUT					
The Open Championship	T13	T18	T15	T7	CUT	T12	CUT	T43	T48	T10
PGA Championship	T26	T13	T58		T73					

Tournament	1980	1981	1982	1983	1984	1985	1986	1987	1988	1989
Masters Tournament										
U.S. Open										
The Open Championship	T60	T35	CUT		T47	WD	T19		T20	
PGA Championship										

Tournament	1990	1991	1992	1993	1994	1995	1996	1997	1998	1999
Masters Tournament										
U.S. Open										
The Open Championship	CUT				CUT	CUT	71			CUT
PGA Championship										

Tournament	2000	2001
Masters Tournament		
U.S. Open		
The Open Championship	CUT	CUT
PGA Championship		

Win
Top 10
Did not play

CUT = missed the halfway cut (3rd round cut in 1976 Open Championship)
WD = withdrew
QF, SF = Round in which player lost in match play
"T" indicates a tie for a place.

=== Summary ===
Tournament	Wins	2nd	3rd	Top-5	Top-10	Top-25	Events	Cuts made
Masters Tournament	0	0	0	0	0	5	15	9
U.S. Open	0	0	2	2	3	6	12	6
The Open Championship	1	2	0	4	6	13	34	20
PGA Championship	0	1	0	1	2	5	9	9
Totals	1	3	2	7	11	29	70	44

- Most consecutive cuts made – 11 (1962 Masters – 1965 Masters)

== Senior major championships ==
=== Wins (2) ===
Year	Championship	Winning score	Margin	Runner(s)-up
1989	Volvo Seniors' British Open	−11 (70-68-65-66=269)	7 strokes	(United States) Billy Casper
1993	Senior British Open (2)	+3 (73-73-71-74=291)	1 stroke	(England) Tommy Horton, (South Africa) Gary Player

== Team appearances ==
Amateur

- Eisenhower Trophy (representing New Zealand): 1958, 1960
- Commonwealth Tournament (representing New Zealand): 1959
- Sloan Morpeth Trophy (representing New Zealand): 1956

Professional

- World Cup (representing New Zealand): 1962, 1963, 1964, 1965, 1966, 1967, 1968, 1971, 1972
- Hennessy Cognac Cup (representing the Rest of the World): 1982
- Dunhill Cup (representing New Zealand): 1985, 1986

== See also ==
- List of golfers with most Champions Tour wins
- List of men's major championships winning golfers
