= Malaysian Dunlop Masters =

Golf tournament

The Malaysian Dunlop Masters was a golf tournament in Malaysia in the 1970s and 1980s. Taiwanese golfer Chen Tze-ming won the 1978 event by a record 15 strokes. Despite his record-breaking win runner-up Simon Owen took the first prize money as Chen was still an amateur.

== Winners ==
This list may be incomplete

Date	Winner	Country	Venue	Score	Margin of victory	Runner(s)-up	Winner's share	Ref
1974	Sukree Onsham	Thailand	Ayer Keroh Golf Course, Malacca City	296 (+8)	2 strokes	(Australia) Ted Ball (Malaysia) Bobby Lim	A$1,340	
1975	Hsu Chi-san	Taiwan	Subang	289 (+1)	1 stroke	(Malaysia) Zainal Abidin Yusof		
1976	Yutaka Suzuki	Japan	Royal Selengor Golf Club	285 (−3)	1 stroke	(United States) Hal Underwood (Malaysia) Bobby Lim		
1977	Yutaka Suzuki	Japan	Tasek Utara Golf Club	291 (+3)	1 stroke	(Malaysia) Zainal Abidin Yusof		
1978	Chen Tze-ming (a)	Taiwan	Subang National Golf Club	267 (−21)	15 strokes	(New Zealand) Simon Owen	US$1,600	
1979	Walter Godfrey	New Zealand	Subang National Golf Club	283 (−5)	2 strokes	(Philippines) Ireneo Legaspi		
1980	Rudy Lavares; Tomomi Suzuki	Philippines; Japan	Seremban Golf Club	290 (+2)	Tied		US$4,500	
1981	Mario Siodina	Philippines	Seremban Golf Club	286 (−2)	1 stroke	(Philippines) Eleuterio Nival		
1982	Zainal Abidin Yusof	Malaysia	Subang National Golf Club	287 (−1)	Playoff	(Philippines) Ben Arda (Taiwan) Hung Fa		
1983	Kyi Hla Han	Burma	Seremban Golf Club	283 (−5)	2 strokes	(Malaysia) Marimuthu Ramayah		
1984	Kyi Hla Han	Burma	Seremban International Golf Club	274 (−14)	4 strokes	(Philippines) Paterno Braza		

== See also ==
- Malaysian Masters
- Volvo Masters of Malaysia
