= 1974–75 New Zealand Golf Circuit =

Golf tour season

1974–75 New Zealand Golf Circuit season
- Duration: 14 November 1974 – 5 January 1975
- Number of official events: 5
- Most wins: (New Zealand) John Lister (2)
- Money list: (New Zealand) John Lister

The 1974–75 New Zealand Golf Circuit was the 12th season of the New Zealand Golf Circuit, the main professional golf tour in New Zealand since it was established in 1963.

== Schedule ==
The following table lists official events during the 1974–75 season.

Date	Tournament	Location	Purse (NZ$)	Winner (Note: The number in brackets after each winner's name is the number of New Zealand Golf Circuit events they had won up to and including that tournament. This information is only shown for New Zealand Golf Circuit members.)	Notes
17 Nov	City of Auckland Classic	Auckland	25,000	(United States) Tom Kite (n/a)	
24 Nov	New Zealand Open	Canterbury	20,000	(United States) Bob Gilder (n/a)	
1 Dec	Otago Charity Classic	Otago	25,000	(New Zealand) John Lister (6)	
8 Dec	Garden City Classic	Canterbury	20,000	(New Zealand) John Lister (7)	
5 Jan	New Zealand PGA Championship	Bay of Plenty	20,000	(Australia) Kel Nagle (18)	

== Money list ==
The money list was based on tournament results during the season, calculated in New Zealand dollars.

Position	Player	Prize money (NZ$)
1	(New Zealand) John Lister	12,075
2	(Australia) Kel Nagle	7,876
3	(Australia) Stewart Ginn	6,701
4	(United States) Tom Kite	5,000
5	(United States) Bob Gilder	4,246
