= New Zealand Amateur =

Amateur golf tournament

Tournament information
- Location: New Zealand
- Established: 1893
- Format: Stroke play and match play

Current champion
- (New Zealand) Mitchell Kale

The New Zealand Amateur is the national amateur golf championship of New Zealand. It has been played annually since 1893, except for the war years and the COVID-19 pandemic, and is organised by New Zealand Golf.

Currently the event is played over five days and consists of a 36-hole stroke-play qualifying stage after which the leading 32 play five rounds of match-play. The final is over 36 holes.

== History ==
The first tournament was organised by Otago Golf Club "open to members of any recognised New Zealand club" held on 30 November and 1 and 2 December 1893, "for the amateur championship of the colony." 16 players entered, primarily from the home club. Two rounds were played on the first day, with the semi-finals on the second morning. The final was played on the third morning between two members of the Otago club, James Somerville and Henry Rose. Somerville won the first four holes but Rose won the next three. Somerville then won five of the next seven to win 6&4. Somerville had only recently arrived in New Zealand, having graduated from Edinburgh University in 1891.

The first championship meeting was held at Christchurch Golf Club in July 1894, with the amateur championship being the main event. The championship was played from 24 to 26 July with two rounds on each of the first two days and the final on the third afternoon. The final was between Hugh MacNeil and James Scott, both from the Otago club, and resulted in an easy win for MacNeil by a score of 7&6.

The 1895 championship meeting was held in the North Island for the first time, at Hutt Golf Club near Wellington, although there were suggestions that it should be played at the newly-opened Wellington Golf Club at Miramar. Until World War I, the venue generally alternated between the north and south islands.

In 1900, Arthur Duncan became the first multiple winner, having also won in 1899. He beat Hugh MacNeil, also a previous winner, in the final. In 1901, Duncan won for the third successive year, winning the final by a score of 9 & 7, the first final to be played over 36 holes. Duncan won again in 1905, while Spencer Gollan became the second multiple winner in 1906, having previously won in 1902. The inaugural New Zealand Open was played in 1907 and the 36-hole event was won by Arthur Duncan who won his fifth Amateur Championship a few days later.

Up to 1907 the event was a pure match-play event. However, with the expansion of the New Zealand Open to 72 holes and the increasing number of entries, a change was made in 1908. The final two rounds of the Open acted as qualifying rounds for the Amateur Championship, after which the leading 32 players played 5 rounds of match-play.

in the period before World War I, Arthur Duncan continued his success in the event, winning in 1909, 1911 and 1914, and he remained undefeated in the final, having won all 8 of those he had reached. He won by a record margin of 11 & 10 in 1911 and repeated the feat in 1914. The other successful player in this period was Bernard Wood who was runner-up in 1910 and then won twice in succession, 1912 and 1913.

Up to 1963, the amateur championship continued as part of the championship meeting, with the New Zealand Open acting as the qualifying event. However, from 1964 the amateur championship, open champion and New Zealand PGA Championship were separated. From 1964, the amateur championship had it own 36-hole qualification stage, the winner receiving the St Andrews Salver. From 1983 until 2011 the qualification was extended to 72 holes and became the New Zealand Stroke Play Championship. From 2012 the New Zealand Stroke Play Championship was run as a separate 72-hole event, while the amateur championship returned to having a 36-hole qualification stage.

== Winners ==
Year	Winner	Score	Runner-up	Venue	Ref.
2025	(New Zealand) Mitchell Kale	1 up	(New Zealand) Isaac Steel	Invercargill GC	
2024	(New Zealand) Cooper Moore	1 up	(New Zealand) Robby Turnbull	Titirangi GC	
2023	(New Zealand) Sebastian May	6 & 5	(New Zealand) Steven Van Heerden	Hamilton GC	
2022	(Australia) Jasper Stubbs	6 & 5	(New Zealand) Mitchell Kale	Otago GC	
2021	Cancelled due to the COVID-19 pandemic				
2020	(New Zealand) James Hydes	3 & 2	(New Zealand) Charlie Smail	Poverty Bay GC	
2019	(New Zealand) Sam Jones	4 & 3	(New Zealand) Mitchell Kale	Remuera GC	
2018	(New Zealand) Charlie Smail	5 & 4	(New Zealand) Kerry Mountcastle	Wairakei GC	
2017	(New Zealand) Daniel Hillier (2)	10 & 9	(New Zealand) Tom Parker	Russley GC	
2016	(Australia) Louis Dobbelaar	2 & 1	(New Zealand) Peter Spearman-Burn	Royal Wellington GC	
2015	(New Zealand) Daniel Hillier	6 & 5	(New Zealand) Sam Vincent	Titirangi GC	
2014	(New Zealand) Joshua Munn	37 holes	(New Zealand) Tae Koh	Nelson GC	
2013	(New Zealand) Kadin Neho	3 & 2	(New Zealand) Ryan Chisnall	Manawatu GC	
2012	(New Zealand) Vaughan McCall	6 & 5	(New Zealand) Peter Lee	Mount Maunganui GC	
2011	(New Zealand) Mathew Perry	4 & 2	(New Zealand) Steven Heyes	Russley GC	
2010	(Australia) Matt Jager (2)	7 & 6	(New Zealand) Brad Kendall	Hastings GC	
2009	(Australia) Matt Jager	6 & 5	(South Africa) Nicol van Wyk	Titirangi GC	
2008	(New Zealand) Thomas Spearman-Burn	4 & 2	(New Zealand) Kevin Smith	Paraparaumu Beach GC	
2007	(New Zealand) Danny Lee	7 & 5	(New Zealand) Nick Gillespie	Hamilton GC	
2006	(New Zealand) Andrew Green	1 up	(Australia) Mitchell Brown	Coringa CC	
2005	(Australia) Mitchell Brown	1 up	(Australia) Andrew Dodt	Manawatu GC	
2004	(Australia) Gavin Flint	5 & 4	(Australia) Jarrod Lyle	Taupo GC	
2003	(Australia) James Nitties	3 & 2	(New Zealand) Hamish Robertson	Chisholm Park GC	
2002	(Australia) Marcus Fraser	2 & 1	(New Zealand) Eddie Lee	Auckland GC	
2001	(New Zealand) Ben Gallie	37 holes	(New Zealand) Matthew Peter	Mount Maunganui GC	
2000	(New Zealand) Eddie Burgess	5 & 3	(Australia) Andrew Webster	Christchurch GC	
1999	(Australia) Andrew Duffin	8 & 7	(New Zealand) Carl Brooking	Remuera GC	
1998	(Australia) Bryce MacDonald	4 & 2	(South Africa) Trevor Immelman	Paraparaumu Beach GC	
1997	(New Zealand) Chris Johns		(New Zealand) Reon Sayers	Harewood GC	
1996	(New Zealand) David Somervaille		(New Zealand) Karl Kitchingham	Napier GC	
1995	(New Zealand) Simon Bittle			Manawatu GC	
1994	(Australia) Paul Fitzgibbon	3 & 1	(New Zealand) Richard Best	Hamilton GC	
1993	(New Zealand) Phil Tataurangi	6 & 4	(Australia) Rob Elkington	New Plymouth GC	
1992	(New Zealand) Richard Lee			Otago GC	
1991	(Australia) Lucas Parsons	2 & 1	(New Zealand) Grant Moorhead	Poverty Bay GC	
1990	(New Zealand) Michael Long		(Australia) David Podlich	Nelson GC	
1989	(Australia) Lester Peterson	6 & 4	(New Zealand) Tony Christie	Taupo GC	
1988	(Australia) Bradley Hughes	2 up	(Australia) Lester Peterson	North Shore GC	
1987	(New Zealand) Owen Kendall	3 & 2	(New Zealand) Geoff Stephens	Waitikiri GC	
1986	(Australia) Peter O'Malley	3 & 1	(Australia) Stephen Taylor	Hutt GC	
1985	(Australia) Gerard Power	7 & 6	(New Zealand) Michael Barltrop	Mount Maunganui GC	
1984	(Australia) Jeff Wagner	2 & 1	(Australia) Tony Dight	St. Clair GC	
1983	(New Zealand) Colin Taylor	2 & 1	(New Zealand) Ted McDougall	Titirangi GC	
1982	(New Zealand) Ian Peters	2 & 1	(Australia) Roger Mackay	Manawatu GC	
1981	(New Zealand) Terry Cochrane	39 holes	(New Zealand) Phil Aickin	Timaru GC	
1980	(New Zealand) Paul Hartstone	38 holes	(New Zealand) Colin Taylor	Lochiel GC	
1979	(New Zealand) John Durry (4)	1 up	(New Zealand) John Finn	Paraparaumu Beach GC	
1978	(New Zealand) Frank Nobilo	9 & 8	(New Zealand) Peter Maude	Hastings GC	
1977	(New Zealand) Terry Pulman (2)	9 & 8	(New Zealand) Bruce Taylor	Russley GC	
1976	(New Zealand) Terry Pulman	4 & 3	(New Zealand) Stuart Reid	New Plymouth GC	
1975	(New Zealand) Stuart Reese	10 & 9	(New Zealand) Stephen Barron	Nelson GC	
1974	(New Zealand) Rodney Barltrop	3 & 1	(New Zealand) Ken Hankin	Manukau GC	
1973	(New Zealand) Mike Nicholson	7 & 6	(New Zealand) Owen Kendall	Springfield GC	
1972	(New Zealand) Ross Murray	4 & 3	(New Zealand) Michael Barltrop	Waitikiri GC	
1971	(New Zealand) Stuart Jones (7)	38 holes	(New Zealand) Ian MacDonald	Hutt GC	
1970	(New Zealand) Ted McDougall (2)	5 & 4	(New Zealand) Robin Dailey	Manawatu GC	
1969	(New Zealand) Graham Stevenson	2 & 1	(New Zealand) Ted McDougall	Nelson GC	
1968	(New Zealand) Bruce Stevens	4 & 3	(New Zealand) A L Day	Titirangi GC	
1967	(New Zealand) John Durry (3)	37 holes	(New Zealand) Stuart Jones	Hastings GC	
1966	(New Zealand) Stuart Jones (6)	8 & 7	(New Zealand) Toby Richards	Russley GC	
1965	(New Zealand) John Durry (2)	7 & 5	(New Zealand) Ray Atkinson	Miramar GC	
1964	(New Zealand) Stuart Jones (5)	37 holes	(New Zealand) Ted McDougall	Hamilton GC	
1963	(New Zealand) John Durry	6 & 5	(New Zealand) Ross Murray	Wanganui GC	
1962	(New Zealand) Stuart Jones (4)	6 & 4	(New Zealand) John Stern	Titirangi GC	
1961	(New Zealand) Stuart Jones (3)	2 & 1	(New Zealand) Ross Newdick	New Plymouth GC	
1960	(New Zealand) Ross Newdick	8 & 7	(New Zealand) Ian Woodbury	Invercargill GC	
1959	(New Zealand) Stuart Jones (2)	5 & 4	(New Zealand) John Durry	Paraparaumu Beach GC	
1958	(New Zealand) Walter Godfrey	2 & 1	(New Zealand) Guy Horne	Hamilton GC	
1957	(New Zealand) Ted McDougall	5 & 4	(New Zealand) W. W. Smith	Manawatu GC	
1956	(Australia) Peter Toogood	3 & 2	(New Zealand) Bob Charles	Christchurch GC	
1955	(New Zealand) Stuart Jones	3 & 2	(New Zealand) Tim Woon	Auckland GC	
1954	(New Zealand) Tim Woon (4)	3 & 2	(New Zealand) Bob Charles	Wellington GC	
1953	(New Zealand) Tim Woon (3)	6 & 4	(New Zealand) Ron Timms	Otago GC	
1952	(Australia) Harry Berwick	7 & 6	(Australia) Jack Coogan	Wanganui GC	
1951	(New Zealand) Tim Woon (2)	7 & 6	(New Zealand) M J Thornton	Titirangi GC	
1950	(New Zealand) Tim Woon	9 & 7	(New Zealand) Tony Gibbs	Christchurch GC	
1949	(New Zealand) Joe Holden	6 & 5	(New Zealand) Denny Sutherland	Hastings GC	
1948	(New Zealand) Tony Gibbs	2 & 1	(New Zealand) Bob Glading	Otago GC	
1947	(New Zealand) Bryan Silk (3)	2 & 1	(Australia) Bill Edgar	New Plymouth GC	
1946	(New Zealand) Guy Horne	4 & 3	(New Zealand) Bert Reilly	Manawatu GC	
1940–1945 No tournament due to World War II					
1939	(New Zealand) John Hornabrook (3)	2 & 1	(New Zealand) Arthur Kitto	Miramar GC	
1938	(New Zealand) Pax Smith	4 & 3	(New Zealand) Bert Reilly	Otago GC	
1937	(New Zealand) Bryan Silk (2)	9 & 8	(New Zealand) Arthur Kitto	Hamilton GC	
1936	(New Zealand) John Hornabrook (2)	6 & 5	(New Zealand) Leslie Cathro	New Plymouth GC	
1935	(New Zealand) John Hornabrook	5 & 4	(New Zealand) Bryan Silk	Christchurch GC	
1934	(New Zealand) Bryan Silk	5 & 4	(New Zealand) Jack Mortland	Wanganui GC	
1933	(New Zealand) Pip Wright	12 & 11	(New Zealand) Harold Black	Titirangi GC	
1932	(New Zealand) Rana Wagg (2)	37 holes	(New Zealand) Bill Horton	Wellington GC	
1931	(New Zealand) Rana Wagg	2 & 1	(New Zealand) Arthur Duncan	Christchurch GC	
1930	(New Zealand) Harold Black	6 & 4	(New Zealand) Jack Black	Manawatu GC	
1929	(New Zealand) Sloan Morpeth (3)	37 holes	(New Zealand) Jack Black	Wanganui GC	
1928	(New Zealand) Bill Horton (2)	1 up	(New Zealand) Jack Black	Otago GC	
1927	(New Zealand) Sloan Morpeth (2)	6 & 5	(New Zealand) Bill Horton	Hamilton GC	
1926	(New Zealand) Arthur Duncan (10)	6 & 5	(New Zealand) Leo Quin	Miramar GC	
1925	(New Zealand) Bill Horton	9 & 8	(New Zealand) Arthur Duncan	Christchurch GC	
1924	(New Zealand) Leo Quin	8 & 7	(New Zealand) Jack Goss	Auckland GC	
1923	(New Zealand) Jack Goss	1 up	(New Zealand) Arthur Duncan	Wanganui GC	
1922	(New Zealand) Arthur Duncan (9)	10 & 9	(New Zealand) Bill Horton	Manawatu GC	
1921	(New Zealand) Alex Sime	5 & 4	(New Zealand) Jack Black	Christchurch GC	
1920	(New Zealand) Sloan Morpeth	8 & 6	(New Zealand) Kenneth Ross	Hamilton GC	
1919	(New Zealand) Hugh Crosse	38 holes	(New Zealand) Arthur Duncan	Napier GC	
1915–1918 No tournament due to World War I					
1914	(New Zealand) Arthur Duncan (8)	11 & 10	(New Zealand) Jack Harold	Auckland GC	
1913	(New Zealand) Bernard Wood (2)	5 & 4	(New Zealand) Kenneth Ross	Otago GC	
1912	(New Zealand) Bernard Wood	6 & 5	(New Zealand) Harold Wright	Wellington GC	
1911	(New Zealand) Arthur Duncan (7)	11 & 10	(New Zealand) Gordon Dodgshun	Wanganui GC	
1910	(New Zealand) Harold Lusk	2 up	(New Zealand) Bernard Wood	Christchurch GC	
1909	(New Zealand) Arthur Duncan (6)	3 & 1	(New Zealand) John Burns	Auckland GC	
1908	(New Zealand) Hamilton Smith	3 & 1	(New Zealand) Harold Lusk	Otago GC	
1907	(New Zealand) Arthur Duncan (5)	10 & 9	(New Zealand) Harold Lusk	Napier GC	
1906	(New Zealand) Spencer Gollan (2)	8 & 7	(New Zealand) William Harman	Christchurch GC	
1905	(New Zealand) Arthur Duncan (4)	5 & 4	(New Zealand) Kenneth Duncan	Auckland GC	
1904	(New Zealand) Arthur Fisher	3 & 2	(New Zealand) George MacEwan	Otago GC	
1903	(New Zealand) Kurupo Tareha	3 & 1	(New Zealand) Edward Nicolaus	Napier GC	
1902	(New Zealand) Spencer Gollan	3 & 1	(New Zealand) Charles Gillies	Christchurch GC	
1901	(New Zealand) Arthur Duncan (3)	9 & 7	(New Zealand) Wilfred Colbeck	Auckland GC	
1900	(New Zealand) Arthur Duncan (2)	3 & 1	(New Zealand) Hugh MacNeil	Otago GC	
1899	(New Zealand) Arthur Duncan	5 & 4	(New Zealand) Norman Perston	Wellington GC	
1898	(New Zealand) William Pryde	5 & 4	(New Zealand) Edmond Wilder	Christchurch GC	
1897	(New Zealand) David Pryde	4 & 2	(New Zealand) Ross Gore	Auckland GC	
1896	(New Zealand) Stanley Todd	2 up	(New Zealand) Hugh MacNeil	Otago GC	
1895	(New Zealand) George Gosset	5 & 3	(New Zealand) Edmond Wilder	Hutt GC	
1894	(New Zealand) Hugh MacNeil	7 & 6	(New Zealand) James Scott	Christchurch GC	
1893	(Scotland) James Somerville	6 & 4	(New Zealand) Henry Rose	Otago GC	

Early finals were over 18 holes but all finals since 1901 have been over 36 holes.

== See also ==
- New Zealand Open
- Golf in New Zealand
