= New Zealand Open =

Men's golf tournament in New Zealand

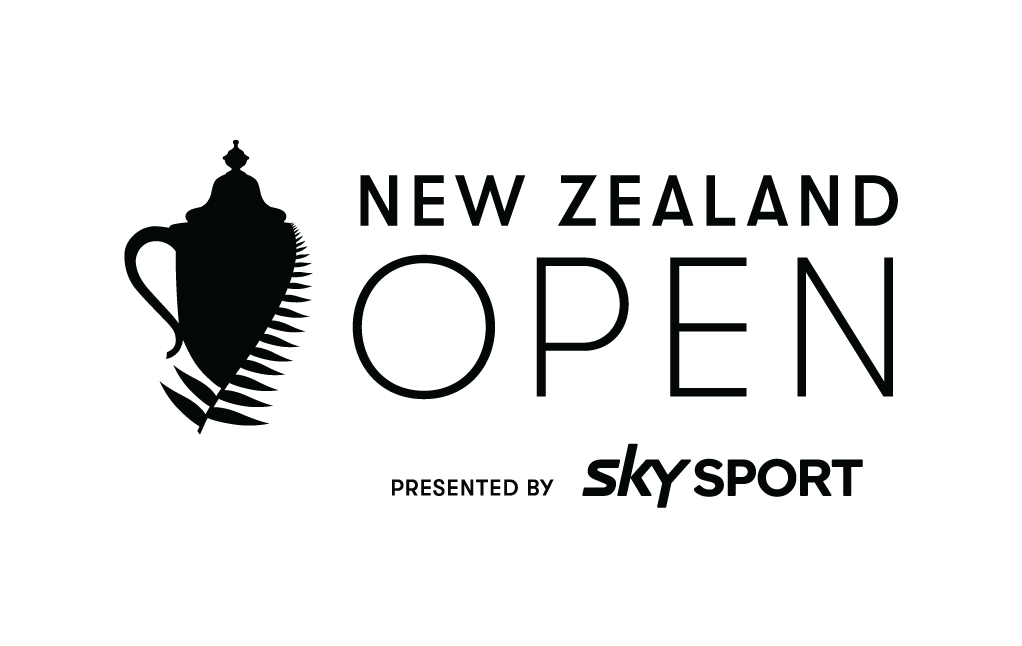

Tournament information
- Location: Arrowtown, New Zealand
- Established: 1907
- Course: Millbrook Resort
- Par: 71
- Length: 6,961 yards (6,365 m)
- Tours: European Tour; Asian Tour; PGA Tour of Australasia; Nationwide Tour; New Zealand Golf Circuit
- Format: Stroke play
- Prize fund: NZ$2,000,000
- Month played: February/March

Tournament record score
- Aggregate: 258 Daniel Nisbet (2018)
- To par: −27 as above

Current champion
- (New Zealand) Daniel Hillier

Location map
- Location in New Zealand

The New Zealand Open is the premier men's golf tournament in New Zealand. It has been a regular fixture on the PGA Tour of Australasia tournament schedule since the 1970s. The 2019 event was the 100th edition of the tournament. Since 2014 it has been held as a pro-am in February or March.

Prize money for the 2020 event was NZ$1.4 million, with an additional NZ$50,000 for the pro-am; the tournament winner received NZ$252,000.

The reigning champion is Daniel Hillier, who won the 2026 event.

== History ==
The New Zealand Amateur Championship had been played since 1893 and at the 1906 championship meeting in Christchurch it was decided to hold a 36-hole Open Championship at the championship meeting in 1907, "open to any professional or amateur in any part of the world" with prizes of £25 and £10 for the leading professionals. The 1907 championship meeting was held at Napier Golf Club. The first round of the Open was played on the morning of 10 September, the amateurs also competing in a club team event. The professional David Hood and amateur J. Carne Bidwell led with rounds of 80. A handicap event was held on the following day and the second round of the Open was played on the morning of 12 September. The amateur Arthur Duncan had a second round of 76 to win with a score of 159, seven ahead of J. Carne Bidwell. The Scottish professional, Jack McLaren, finished third on 167 with David Hood fourth on 168. McLaren and Hood took the cash prizes of £25 and £10.

In 1908 the tournament was extended to 72 holes, and was won by Joe Clements, the first notable New Zealand-born professional golfer. There were no Opens from 1915 to 1918 due to World War I and the championship was again cancelled from 1940 to 1945 due to World War II.

In early 1923, G. Brodie Breeze, a golf club maker in Glasgow offered a trophy for the event, an offer that was accepted by the New Zealand Golf Association. The trophy was first presented to the 1923 winner, Arthur Brooks, and is held "from year to year" by the winner of the Open. The Jellicoe Cup was presented by Viscount Jellicoe, the second Governor-General of New Zealand, in 1924 and is awarded for the lowest round in the championship. The Bledisloe Cup was presented by Lord Bledisloe, the fourth Governor-General, in 1934 and is awarded to the leading amateur.

The 1937 event was thought to be won by Alex Murray. However, shortly after the tournament ended it was discovered that Murray hit a putt while his playing partner was also putting. Though unintentional, this was a rule violation. Murray was therefore disqualified. John Hornabrook, the reigning New Zealand Amateur champion, Andrew Shaw, the defending New Zealand Open champion, and Ernie Moss played off for title the following day. Hornabrook won the 18-hole playoff.

In 1954 Bob Charles, who was later to become the only New Zealander to win a major championship in the 20th century, won as an 18-year-old amateur. He won again in 1966, 1971 and 1973, as a professional, and he and the two Australian major champions Peter Thomson and Kel Nagle dominated the event from the early 1950s to the mid-1970s. Thomson won the event nine times while Nagle won it seven times.

In 1966 Australian professionals were banned from playing in the tournament by the Australian PGA. The intention of the Australian PGA was to protect the North Coast Open tournament at Coffs Harbour, Australia and ensure that all of the best Australian players entered that event. Despite the ban, Kel Nagle and Len Thomas played in the event.

Other well known winners have included the American Corey Pavin in 1984 and 1985, and Michael Campbell in 2000. Campbell joined Charles as a major champion when he won the 2005 U.S. Open.

In 2002, Tiger Woods took part as a thank you to his New Zealand caddie Steve Williams, but he did not win. His participation caused some controversy when ticket prices were raised sharply that year.

The New Zealand Open is a PGA Tour of Australasia tournament, and in 2005 was co-sanctioned for the first time by the European Tour, which led to a doubling of the prize fund to 1.5 million New Zealand Dollars. The European Tour had co-sanctioned PGA Tour of Australasia events before, but they had all been in Australia, making this the tour's first ever visit to New Zealand. In 2006 the event was moved to November, taking its place on the European Tour schedule for the following calendar year. The 2007 event was the last to be co-sanctioned by the European Tour, and with the tournament being rescheduled to March, there was also no New Zealand Open on the 2008 Australasian Tour. The 2009 and 2010 tournaments were also co-sanctioned by the Nationwide Tour, the official development tour of the PGA Tour. From 2011 to 2017 it was solely sanctioned by the PGA Tour of Australasia while since 2018 it has been co-sanctioned by the Asian Tour. Since 2014 it has also been run in partnership with the Japan Golf Tour, an arrangement whereby a number of golfers from that tour compete in the event, although it is not an official event on the Japanese tour.

Since 2014 the Championship has been a pro-am event. A professional field of 156 play with an amateur partner for the first two rounds, alternately at The Hills and Millbrook Resort before the second round cut of 60 and ties. From 2014 to 2016 and in 2019 the final two rounds of the championship were played at The Hills. In 2017, 2018 and 2020 they were played at Millbrook Resort. The New Zealand Pro-Am Championship runs alongside the main tournament in a best-ball format. After a second round cut, the top 40 pro-am pairs progress to the third round, with a further cut to the top 10 pairs who play in the final round.

The New Zealand Open was cancelled in 2021 and 2022 due to the global COVID-19 pandemic.

== Venues ==
Venue	Location	First	Last	Times
Napier Golf Club	Waiohiki, Napier	1907	1919	2
Otago Golf Club	Maori Hill, Dunedin	1908	1971	7
Royal Auckland Golf Club	Middlemore, Auckland	1909	2003	9
Christchurch Golf Club	Shirley, Christchurch	1910	1982	11
Wanganui Golf Club	Belmont links, Wanganui	1911	1978	8
Royal Wellington Golf Club	Heretaunga, Wellington	1912	1995	7
Hamilton Golf Club	St Andrews, Hamilton	1920	1975	6
Manawatu Golf Club	Hokowhitu, Palmerston North	1922	1973	5
Miramar Golf Club	Miramar, Wellington	1926	1939	2
Titirangi Golf Club	Titirangi, Auckland	1933	1962	3
New Plymouth Golf Club	Fitzroy, New Plymouth	1936	1980	4
Hastings Golf Club	Maraekakaho, Hastings	1949	1949	1
Paraparaumu Beach Golf Club	Paraparaumu Beach, Paraparaumu	1959	2002	12
Invercargill Golf Club	Otatara, Invercargill	1960	1960	1
The Grange Golf Club	Papatoetoe, Auckland	1970	2004	5
St Clair Golf Club	St Clair, Dunedin	1979	1979	1
Russley Golf Club	Burnside, Christchurch	1985	1985	1
Remuera Golf Club	Remuera, Auckland	1994	1994	1
Formosa Golf Club	Beachlands, Auckland	1998	1998	1
Gulf Harbour Country Club	Gulf Harbour, Whangaparaoa	2005	2006	2
The Hills Golf Club	Arrowtown, near Queenstown	2007	2020	7 (+3)
Clearwater Golf Club	Belfast, Christchurch	2011	2012	2
Millbrook Resort	Arrowtown, near Queenstown	2014	2026	7 (+4)

Since 2014 the first two rounds have been played on two different courses, everyone playing one round on each course. After the cut, one of the courses is then used for the final two rounds. The number in brackets refers to the occasions where the course was just used for the first two rounds.

== Winners ==
Year	Tour(s) (Note: ANZ − PGA Tour of Australasia; ASA − Asian Tour; EUR − European Tour; NWT − Nationwide Tour; NZGC − New Zealand Golf Circuit.)	Winner	Score	To par	Margin of victory	Runner(s)-up	Venue(s)	Ref.
New Zealand Open
2026	ANZ, ASA	(New Zealand) Daniel Hillier	262	−22	2 strokes	(Australia) Lucas Herbert	Millbrook	
2025	ANZ, ASA	(Australia) Ryan Peake	261	−23	1 stroke	(Japan) Kazuki Higa (South Africa) Ian Snyman (Australia) Jack Thompson	Millbrook	
2024	ANZ, ASA	(Japan) Takahiro Hataji	267	−17	1 stroke	(Australia) Scott Hend	Millbrook	
2023	ANZ, ASA	(Australia) Brendan Jones	266	−18	3 strokes	(New Zealand) Ben Campbell (South Korea) Eom Jae-woong (Japan) Tomoyo Ikemura (Australia) John Lyras	Millbrook	
2022	ANZ, ASA	Cancelled due to the COVID-19 pandemic						
2021		Cancelled due to the COVID-19 pandemic						
2020	ANZ, ASA	(Australia) Brad Kennedy (2)	264	−21	2 strokes	(Australia) Lucas Herbert	Millbrook; The Hills	
2019	ANZ, ASA	(Australia) Zach Murray	266	−21	2 strokes	(New Zealand) Josh Geary (Australia) Ashley Hall	The Hills; Millbrook	
ISPS Handa New Zealand Open
2018	ANZ, ASA	(Australia) Daniel Nisbet	258	−27	2 strokes	(Australia) Terry Pilkadaris	Millbrook; The Hills	
2017	ANZ	(New Zealand) Michael Hendry	266	−19	Playoff (Note: Hendry won with a par at the first hole of a sudden death playoff.)	(New Zealand) Ben Campbell (Australia) Brad Kennedy	Millbrook; The Hills	
BMW ISPS Handa New Zealand Open
2016	ANZ	(Australia) Matthew Griffin	267	−20	1 stroke	(Japan) Hideto Tanihara	The Hills; Millbrook	
BMW New Zealand Open
2015	ANZ	(Australia) Jordan Zunic	266	−21	1 stroke	(Australia) David Bransdon	The Hills; Millbrook	
New Zealand Open
2014	ANZ	(Australia) Dimitrios Papadatos	270	−18	4 strokes	(New Zealand) Mark Brown	The Hills; Millbrook	
BMW New Zealand Open
2013: No tournament
2012	ANZ	(Australia) Jake Higginbottom (a)	281	−7	1 stroke	(Australia) Jason Norris (Australia) Peter Wilson	Clearwater	
2011	ANZ	(Australia) Brad Kennedy	281	−7	Playoff (Note: Kennedy won with a birdie on the first hole of a sudden death playoff.)	(Australia) Craig Parry	Clearwater	
Michael Hill New Zealand Open
2010	ANZ, NWT	(United States) Bobby Gates	274	−14	1 stroke	(Australia) Andrew Dodt	The Hills	
2009	ANZ, NWT	(United States) Alex Prugh	269	−19	3 strokes	(United States) Martin Piller	The Hills	
2008: No tournament
2007	ANZ, EUR	(England) Richard Finch	274	−14	3 strokes	(Australia) Steven Bowditch (Australia) Paul Sheehan	The Hills	
Blue Chip New Zealand Open
2006	ANZ, EUR	(Australia) Nathan Green	279	−5	2 strokes	(New Zealand) Michael Campbell (England) Nick Dougherty (Australia) Marcus Fraser (Australia) Jarrod Moseley (Australia) Wade Ormsby (Australia) Brett Rumford	Gulf Harbour	
Holden New Zealand Open
2005	ANZ, EUR	(Sweden) Niclas Fasth	266	−22	Playoff (Note: Fasth won with a birdie on the second hole of a sudden-death playoff.)	(England) Miles Tunnicliff	Gulf Harbour	
2004	ANZ	(Australia) Terry Price	271	−9	1 stroke	(New Zealand) Brad Heaven (a)	The Grange	
2003	ANZ	(New Zealand) Mahal Pearce	278	−10	2 strokes	(Australia) Brett Rumford	Auckland	
TelstraSaturn Hyundai New Zealand Open
2002	ANZ	(Australia) Craig Parry	273	−11	1 stroke	(New Zealand) Steven Alker (New Zealand) Michael Campbell (Australia) Stephen Leaney	Paraparaumu Beach	
New Zealand Open
2001	ANZ	(New Zealand) David Smail	273	−7	2 strokes	(New Zealand) Steven Alker (New Zealand) Michael Campbell (England) Roger Chapman (Australia) Nathan Gatehouse	The Grange	
Crown Lager New Zealand Open
2000	ANZ	(New Zealand) Michael Campbell	269	−15	Playoff (Note: Campbell won with an eagle on the second hole of a sudden-death playoff.)	(New Zealand) Craig Perks	Paraparaumu Beach	
New Zealand Open
1999: No tournament
1998	ANZ	(New Zealand) Matthew Lane	279	−9	3 strokes	(Australia) Rod Pampling	Formosa	
AMP Air New Zealand Open
1997	ANZ	(New Zealand) Greg Turner (2)	278	−10	7 strokes	(Scotland) Andrew Coltart (France) Jean-Louis Guépy (Australia) Lucas Parsons	Auckland	
1996	ANZ	(New Zealand) Michael Long	275	−9	4 strokes	(Australia) Peter O'Malley	Paraparaumu Beach	
1995 (Dec)	ANZ	(Australia) Peter O'Malley	272	−8	3 strokes	(United States) Scott Hoch	The Grange	
1995 (Jan)	ANZ	(Australia) Lucas Parsons	282	−6	1 stroke	(Australia) Mike Clayton	Wellington	
AMP New Zealand Open
1994	ANZ	(Australia) Craig Jones	277	−7	1 stroke	(New Zealand) Frank Nobilo	Remuera	
1993	ANZ	(Australia) Peter Fowler	274	−10	2 strokes	(New Zealand) Elliot Boult	Paraparaumu Beach	
1992	ANZ	(New Zealand) Grant Waite	268	−16	2 strokes	(Australia) Peter Fowler (Australia) Grant Kenny	Paraparaumu Beach	
1991	ANZ	(Australia) Rodger Davis (2)	273	−11	2 strokes	(New Zealand) Frank Nobilo	Paraparaumu Beach	
1990: No tournament
1989	ANZ	(New Zealand) Greg Turner	277	−7	6 strokes	(United States) Richard Gilkey	Paraparaumu Beach	
Nissan-Mobil New Zealand Open
1988	ANZ	(Australia) Ian Stanley	273	−11	3 strokes	(Australia) Mike Clayton	Paraparaumu Beach	
1987	ANZ	(Northern Ireland) Ronan Rafferty	279	−9	Playoff (Note: Rafferty won with a par on the seventh hole of a sudden-death playoff.)	(United States) Larry Nelson	Wellington	
1986	ANZ	(Australia) Rodger Davis	262	−18	8 strokes	(Australia) Bob Shearer	The Grange	
New Zealand Open
1985	ANZ	(United States) Corey Pavin (2)	277	−15	4 strokes	(Australia) Jeff Senior	Russley	
1984	ANZ	(United States) Corey Pavin	269	−19	4 strokes	(Australia) Terry Gale	Paraparaumu Beach	
1983	ANZ	(Australia) Ian Baker-Finch	280	E	3 strokes	(New Zealand) Stuart Reese	Auckland	
New Zealand BP Open
1982	ANZ	(Australia) Terry Gale	284	−4	2 strokes	(New Zealand) Bob Charles	Christchurch	
1981	ANZ	(Australia) Bob Shearer (2)	285	−3	3 strokes	(Australia) Terry Gale	Wellington	
New Zealand Open
1980	ANZ	(United States) Buddy Allin	274	−14	1 stroke	(Republic of Ireland) Eamonn Darcy	New Plymouth	
1979	NZGC	(Australia) Stewart Ginn	278	−6	3 strokes	(New Zealand) Simon Owen	St Clair	
1978	NZGC	(Australia) Bob Shearer	277	−3	1 stroke	(Scotland) Brian Barnes	Wanganui	
1977	NZGC	(United States) Bob Byman	290	+6	1 stroke	(Australia) Terry Gale	Auckland	
1976	NZGC	(New Zealand) Simon Owen	284	−8	7 strokes	(England) Doug McClelland	Wellington	
1975	NZGC	(Australia) Bill Dunk (2)	272	−16	4 strokes	(United States) Bill Brask (United States) Bruce Fleisher	Hamilton	
1974	NZGC	(United States) Bob Gilder	283	−5	Playoff (Note: Gilder won with a birdie on the third hole of a sudden-death playoff. Newton had been eliminated by at the second extra hole when he failed to make par.)	(New Zealand) Bob Charles (Australia) Jack Newton	Christchurch	
1973	NZGC	(New Zealand) Bob Charles (4)	283	−5	4 strokes	(Australia) Ian Stanley	Manawatu	
1972	NZGC	(Australia) Bill Dunk	279	−5	1 stroke	(England) Maurice Bembridge	Paraparaumu Beach	
1971	NZGC	(Australia) Peter Thomson (9)	276	−8	2 strokes	(England) Maurice Bembridge	Otago	
1970	NZGC	(New Zealand) Bob Charles (3)	271	−13	1 stroke	(Australia) Graham Marsh	The Grange	
1969	NZGC	(Australia) Kel Nagle (7)	273	−7	2 strokes	(New Zealand) John Lister	Wanganui	
1968	NZGC	(Australia) Kel Nagle (6)	272	−8	7 strokes	(Australia) Frank Phillips	Christchurch	
1967	NZGC	(Australia) Kel Nagle (5)	275	−9	4 strokes	(Australia) Ted Ball	Hamilton	
1966	NZGC	(New Zealand) Bob Charles (2)	273	−19	13 strokes	(England) Guy Wolstenholme	Paraparaumu Beach	
1965	NZGC	(Australia) Peter Thomson (8)	278	−2	8 strokes	(New Zealand) Bob Charles (Australia) Kel Nagle	Auckland	
1964	NZGC	(Australia) Kel Nagle (4)	266	−26	12 strokes	(Australia) Frank Phillips	Christchurch	
1963	NZGC	(Australia) Bruce Devlin	273	−11	1 stroke	(Australia) Peter Thomson	Wanganui	
1962		(Australia) Kel Nagle (3)	281		2 strokes	(New Zealand) Walter Godfrey (a)	Titirangi	
1961		(Australia) Peter Thomson (7)	267		9 strokes	(Australia) Kel Nagle	New Plymouth	
1960		(Australia) Peter Thomson (6)	281	−3	1 stroke	(Australia) Kel Nagle	Invercargill	
1959		(Australia) Peter Thomson (5)	287	−5	Playoff (Note: Thomson beat Nagle 67 to 73 in an 18-hole playoff.)	(Australia) Kel Nagle	Paraparaumu Beach	
1958		(Australia) Kel Nagle (2)	278		2 strokes	(Australia) Peter Thomson	Hamilton	
1957		(Australia) Kel Nagle	294		4 strokes	(Australia) Peter Thomson	Manawatu	
1956		(Australia) Harry Berwick (a)	292		2 strokes	(New Zealand) Bob Charles (a)	Christchurch	
1955		(Australia) Peter Thomson (4)	280	−8	10 strokes	(Australia) Kel Nagle	Auckland	
1954		(New Zealand) Bob Charles (a)	280		2 strokes	(Australia) Bruce Crampton	Wellington	
1953		(Australia) Peter Thomson (3)	295	+7	5 strokes	(New Zealand) Frank Buckler	Otago	
1952		(New Zealand) Alex Murray (3)	293		1 stroke	(Australia) Harry Berwick (a)	Wanganui	
1951		(Australia) Peter Thomson (2)	288		4 strokes	(New Zealand) Frank Buckler (New Zealand) Tim Woon (a)	Titirangi	
1950		(Australia) Peter Thomson	280		9 strokes	(New Zealand) Alf Guy	Christchurch	
1949		(New Zealand) Jim Galloway	283		1 stroke	(New Zealand) Bob Glading (New Zealand) L B Johnston (a)	Hastings	
1948		(New Zealand) Alex Murray (2)	294		1 stroke	(New Zealand) Bryan Silk (a)	Otago	
1947		(New Zealand) Bob Glading (a) (2)	291		3 strokes	(New Zealand) Alex Murray	New Plymouth	
1946		(New Zealand) Bob Glading (a)	306		Playoff (Note: Glading beat Moss 73 to 75 in an 18-hole playoff.)	(New Zealand) Norman Fuller	Manawatu	
1940–1945: No tournament due to World War II
1939		(New Zealand) John Hornabrook (a) (2)	291		3 strokes	(New Zealand) Alex Murray	Miramar	
1938		(South Africa) Bobby Locke	288		3 strokes	(New Zealand) Andrew Shaw (New Zealand) Basil Smith, Jr.	Otago	
1937		(New Zealand) John Hornabrook (a)	299		Playoff (Note: Hornabrook scored 73 in the 18-hole playoff, beating Moss (75) and Shaw (76).)	(New Zealand) Ernie Moss (New Zealand) Andrew Shaw	Hamilton	
1936		(New Zealand) Andrew Shaw (7)	292		5 strokes	(New Zealand) Tom Galloway (New Zealand) Alf Guy	New Plymouth	
1935		(New Zealand) Alex Murray	286		2 strokes	(New Zealand) Andrew Shaw	Christchurch	
1934		(New Zealand) Andrew Shaw (6)	288		5 strokes	(New Zealand) Norrie Bell	Wanganui	
1933		(New Zealand) Ernie Moss (3)	300		Playoff (Note: Moss beat Douglas 146 to 155 in a 36-hole playoff.)	(Scotland) Ted Douglas	Titirangi	
1932		(New Zealand) Andrew Shaw (5)	289		5 strokes	(New Zealand) Arthur Duncan (a)	Wellington	
1931		(New Zealand) Andrew Shaw (4)	287		1 stroke	(New Zealand) Ewen Macfarlane (a)	Christchurch	
1930		(New Zealand) Andrew Shaw (3)	284		18 strokes	(New Zealand) D C Collins (a) (New Zealand) Jock McIntosh (New Zealand) Fred Rutter	Manawatu	
1929		(New Zealand) Andrew Shaw (2)	299		3 strokes	(New Zealand) Bill Horton (a)	Wanganui	
1928		(New Zealand) Sloan Morpeth (a)	303		2 strokes	(New Zealand) Andrew Shaw	Otago	
1927		(New Zealand) Ernie Moss (2)	300		4 strokes	(New Zealand) Norrie Bell (a) (New Zealand) Andrew Shaw	Hamilton	
1926		(New Zealand) Andrew Shaw	307		Playoff (Note: Shaw beat Moss 76 to 80 in an 18-hole playoff.)	(New Zealand) Ernie Moss	Miramar	
1925		(New Zealand) Ewen Macfarlane (a)	308		2 strokes	(New Zealand) Jock McIntosh (New Zealand) Andrew Shaw	Christchurch	
1924		(New Zealand) Ernie Moss	301		10 strokes	(New Zealand) Arthur Duncan (a)	Auckland	
1923		(New Zealand) Arthur Brooks (2)	312		2 strokes	(New Zealand) Jack Black (a) (New Zealand) Joe Clements (New Zealand) Arthur Duncan (a) (New Zealand) Fred Hood	Wanganui	
1922		(New Zealand) Arthur Brooks	308		1 stroke	(New Zealand) Jack Black (a)	Manawatu	
1921		(Scotland) Ted Douglas (4)	302		9 strokes	(New Zealand) Ernie Moss	Christchurch	
1920		(Australia) Joe Kirkwood Sr.	304		11 strokes	(Australia) Arthur East (New Zealand) Sloan Morpeth (a)	Hamilton	
1919		(Scotland) Ted Douglas (3)	327		Playoff (Note: Douglas beat Morpeth 82 to 85 in an 18-hole playoff.)	(New Zealand) Sloan Morpeth (a)	Napier	
1915–1918: No tournament due to World War I
1914		(Scotland) Ted Douglas (2)	313		2 strokes	(New Zealand) Arthur Duncan (a)	Auckland	
1913		(Scotland) Ted Douglas	303		9 strokes	(New Zealand) Reg Butters	Otago	
1912		(New Zealand) Joe Clements (3)	322		3 strokes	(New Zealand) Bernard Wood (a)	Wellington	
1911		(New Zealand) Arthur Duncan (a) (3)	319		3 strokes	(New Zealand) J C Johnson	Wanganui	
1910		(New Zealand) Arthur Duncan (a) (2)	295		11 strokes	(New Zealand) Joe Clements	Christchurch	
1909		(New Zealand) Joe Clements (2)	324		6 strokes	(New Zealand) John Carne Bidwill (a)	Auckland	
1908		(New Zealand) Joe Clements	335		1 stroke	(New Zealand) David Hood	Otago	
1907		(New Zealand) Arthur Duncan (a)	159		7 strokes	(New Zealand) John Carne Bidwill (a)	Napier	

== Bledisloe Cup winners ==
The Bledisloe Cup was presented by Lord Bledisloe, the fourth Governor-General, in 1934 and is awarded to the leading amateur.

- 1934 Bryan Silk
- 1935 Arthur Duncan
- 1936 Bryan Silk
- 1937 John Hornabrook
- 1938 Tony Gibbs
- 1939 John Hornabrook
- 1946 Bob Glading
- 1947 Bob Glading
- 1948 Bryan Silk
- 1949 L.B. Johnston
- 1950 Tim Woon
- 1951 Tim Woon
- 1952 Harry Berwick
- 1953 Tim Woon
- 1954 Bob Charles
- 1955 Stuart Jones
- 1956 Harry Berwick
- 1957 Bob Charles
- 1958 Ross Murray
- 1959 Stuart Jones
- 1960 Stuart Jones
- 1961 John Durry
- 1962 Walter Godfrey
- 1963 Bryan Silk
- 1964 Peter Rankin
- 1965 Ross Murray
- 1966 John Durry
- 1967 Ted McDougall
- 1968 R.M. Farrant
- 1969 J.M. Lacy
- 1970 Ted McDougall
- 1971 Geoff Clarke
- 1972 Chris Alldred
- 1973 Stuart Jones
- 1974 D.L. Beggs, Stuart Reese
- 1975 Rick Barker
- 1976 Geoff Saunders
- 1977 David Meredith
- 1978 Phil Mosley
- 1979 Michael Atkinson, Phil Aickin
- 1980 Phil Aickin
- 1981 Phil Aickin
- 1982 John Williamson
- 1983 Peter Creighton
- 1984 Paul Devenport
- 1985 Owen Kendall
- 1986 Michael Barltrop, Glen Goldfinch
- 1987 P. Fox
- 1988 Phil Tataurangi
- 1989 Steven Alker
- 1991 Tony Christie
- 1992 Grant Moorhead
- 1993 Richard Lee, Phil Tataurangi
- 1994 Glen Goldfinch
- 1995 (Jan) Mark Brown
- 1995 (Dec) Mark Brown
- 1996 Brad Heaven
- 1997 David Somervaille
- 1998 Reon Sayer
- 2000 Aaron Baddeley
- 2001 Eddie Lee
- 2002 Adam Groom
- 2003 Chris Johns
- 2004 Brad Heaven
- 2005 Josh Geary
- 2006 James Gill, Troy Ropina
- 2007 Danny Lee
- 2009 Thomas Spearman-Burn
- 2010 Matt Jager
- 2011 Jake Higginbottom
- 2012 Jake Higginbottom
- 2014 Jordan Bakermans
- 2015 Joshua Munn
- 2016 Daniel Hillier
- 2017 Ryan Chisnall
- 2018 Daniel Hillier
- 2019 Lee Jang-hyun
- 2020 Jimmy Zheng
- 2023 Kazuma Kobori
- 2024 Zack Swanwick
- 2025 Cooper Moore
- 2026 Yuki Miya

== See also ==
- New Zealand Women's Open
- Golf in New Zealand
- Open golf tournament
