= Wakatipu =

Wakatipu is the name of a district in inland Otago, New Zealand.

- The best known geographical feature with that name is Lake Wakatipu.
- The Wakatipu Basin is a flat area to the North East of Lake Wakatipu surrounded by mountains.
- There was once a Wakatipu electoral district.
- Numerous organisations and clubs have Wakatipu as part of their names, e.g. the Wakatipu Aero Club.
