= Bob Glading =

New Zealand golfer

Personal information
- Full name: Robert Henry Glading
- Nationality: New Zealand
- Born: 10 March 1920
- Died: 19 August 2014 (aged 94)

Career
- Sport: Golf
- Turned professional: 1949
- Professional wins: 3

Achievements and awards
- Distinguished Service Cross: 1945
- Member of the New Zealand Order of Merit: 2007

Robert Henry Glading MNZM DSC (10 March 1920 – 19 August 2014) was a New Zealand golfer. He won consecutive New Zealand Open championships in 1946 and 1947.

== Biography ==
Growing up in Lower Hutt, Glading earned pocket money as a golf caddy, and he caddied at the 1932 New Zealand Open at the Wellington Golf Club at Heretaunga.

As a 17-year-old amateur player, he entered the 1937 New Zealand Open in Hamilton, where he tied for 28th place. In the national amateur match-play championship that year he lost in the first round to Australian Harry Hattersley 4 and 3. The next year, Glading contested the 1938 New Zealand Open at Balmacewen in Dunedin, carding a 72-hole aggregate of 298, to finish 10 shots behind the champion, Bobby Locke, and reached the third round of the amateur match-play contest.

After finishing second in the 1939 North Island championship, losing on the second extra hole, Glading finished seventh in that year's New Zealand Open at Miramar, having been tied for the lead after the first round. He then once again reached the third round of the national amateur match-play.

In 1940, Glading won the North Island amateur championships, and in October that year he set a course record of 65, 9 under par, at the Hamilton Golf Club. He won the New Zealand amateur championship in 1942.

During World War II, Glading was an officer in the Royal New Zealand Naval Volunteer Reserve and served with the Royal Navy Fleet Air Arm, flying missions in Corsairs over Norway and in the Pacific. In November 1945 he was awarded the Distinguished Service Cross, for outstanding skill and courage while serving in air operations against the Japanese during July and August 1945.

In 1946, he played as an amateur in the New Zealand Open at the Manawatu Golf Club, using clubs that he had made himself, and won the event in a play-off after a four-round total of 306. He repeated the win the following year at New Plymouth with a three-shot victory over Alex Murray, carding rounds of 70, 68, 77 and 76.

At the Australian Open at Kingston Heath in 1948, Glading finished tied for eighth with Kel Nagle.

In 1949, Glading won the New Zealand PGA Championship at Hastings, defeating 1948 New Zealand Open champion Jim Galloway, 2 up.

Glading went to England in 1951 to follow a flying career. He entered The Open Championship in 1952, but was posted to HMS Indomitable and was unable to compete.

Partnered with D.L. Woon, Glading won the 1955 New Zealand amateur foursomes championship.

Glading and his family moved to South Africa in the early 1960s after he was offered a job while playing in the Commonwealth Tournament there in 1959. They later returned to New Zealand.

In 1999 Glading made his only hole-in-one, on the eighth hole at Muriwai. In the 2007 New Year Honours he was appointed a Member of the New Zealand Order of Merit, for services to golf.

As well as being a caddy, player and club maker, Glading wrote a column for golf magazine The Cut, did television commentary work and served on the board of The First Tee of New Zealand, a golfing charity.

Glading died at his home in the Auckland suburb of Northcross in 2014. At the time of his death he was the oldest surviving New Zealand Open champion.
