= Lake Hayes =

- Te Whakaata a Hakitekura
- Te Whakaata a Hakitekura (Māori)
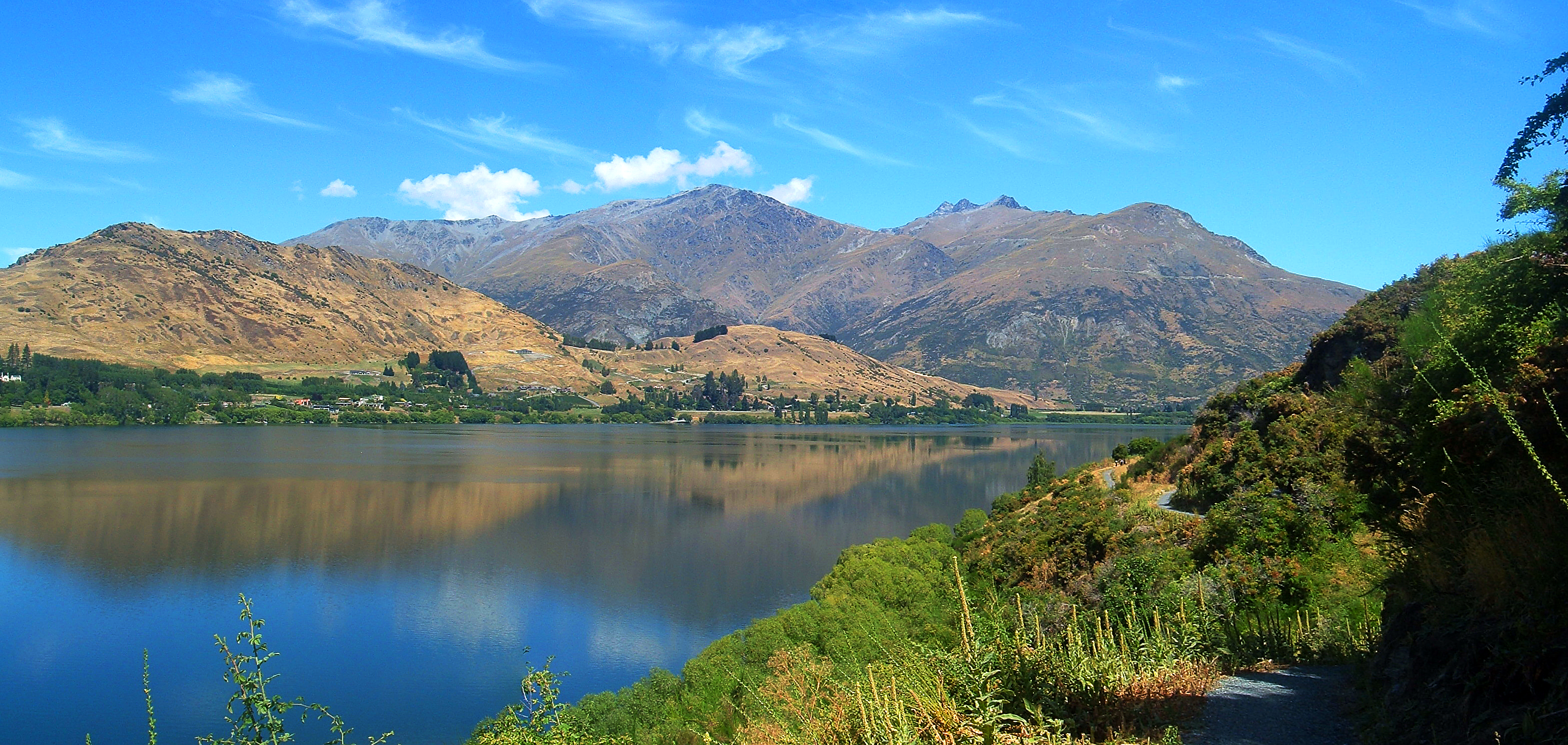
- Lake Hayes from the Queenstown Trail

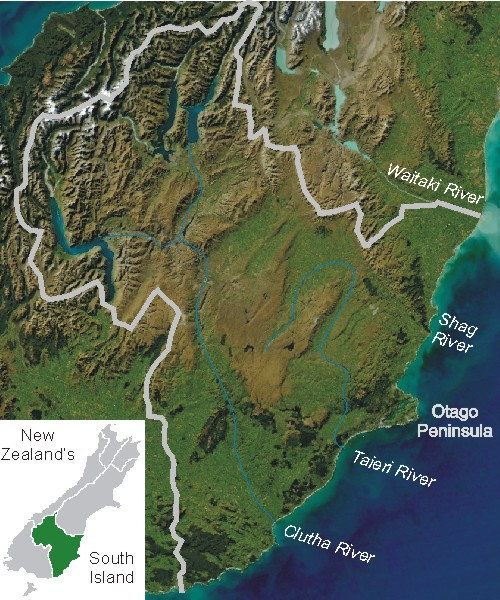
- Location within Otago peninsula
- Interactive map of Lake Hayes
- Location: Central Otago, South Island
- Coordinates: 44°59′S 168°48′E
- Lake type: Glacial lake
- Primary inflows: Mill Creek
- Primary outflows: Hayes Creek
- Catchment area: 44 km^{2} (17 sq mi)
- Basin countries: New Zealand
- Surface area: 2.76 km^{2} (1.07 sq mi)
- Max. depth: 33 m (108 ft)
- Surface elevation: 315 m (1,033 ft)

Lake Hayes (Māori: Waiwhakaata) is a small lake in the Wakatipu Basin in Central Otago, in New Zealand's South Island. It is located close to the towns of Arrowtown and Queenstown.

The southern end of the lake is close to State Highway 6, while the western side is bordered by Slope Hill. The main area for access to the lake is the northern end which has a large grassed area for recreation activities.

The Lake Hayes Showgrounds which have a pavilion and parking area has an annual show called The Lake Hayes A&P Show.

The nearby large residential sub-division of Lake Hayes Estate is just across the main highway and takes its name from Lake Hayes.

A track called the Lake Hayes Circuit runs around the lake and forms part of The Queenstown Trail and is popular for use by walkers, runners and cyclists.

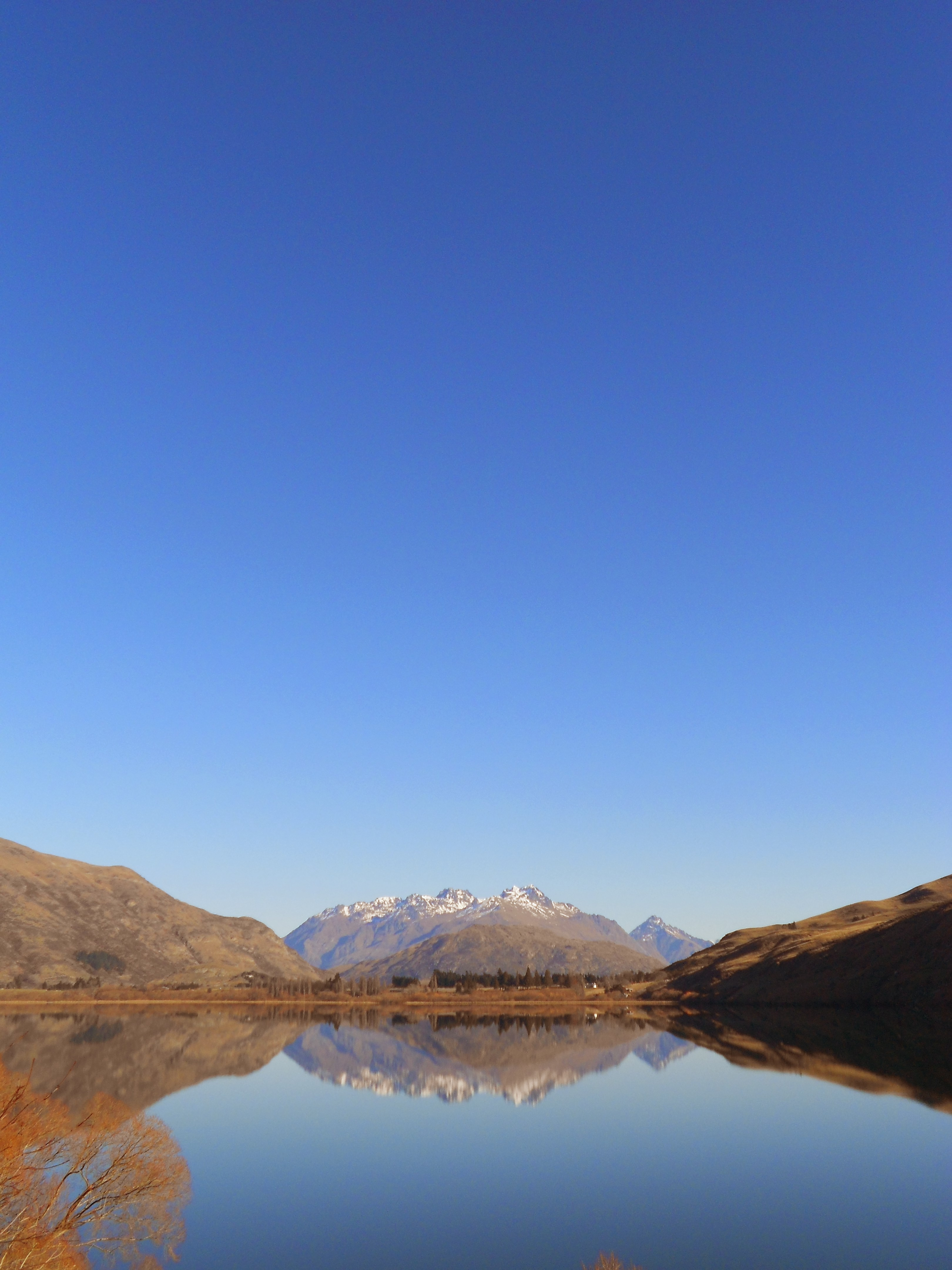
View from the north shore looking southwest across Lake Hayes towards Cecil Peak

== History ==
The local Māori iwi (tribe) of Ngāi Tahu originally named the lake Te Whaka-ata or Te Whaka-ata a Haki-te-kura after an ancestress called Haki-te-kura whose image was said to be reflected in the lake.

Settlers originally knew the lake as Hays Lake after D. Hay, an Australian who came to the district looking for sheep country in 1859. Its name gradually changed to Lake Hayes, as its discovery was credited erroneously to Captain "Bully" Hayes, an early local character of the district.

== Fauna ==
Birdlife that can be seen on the lake include the introduced mallard, feral goose, the native New Zealand scaup, Australasian crested grebe and the black shag.

Exotic fish in the lake that can be taken recreationally include brown trout and perch, while native fish include upland bully, koaro and long-finned eel.
