= Shotover Country =

- Suburb
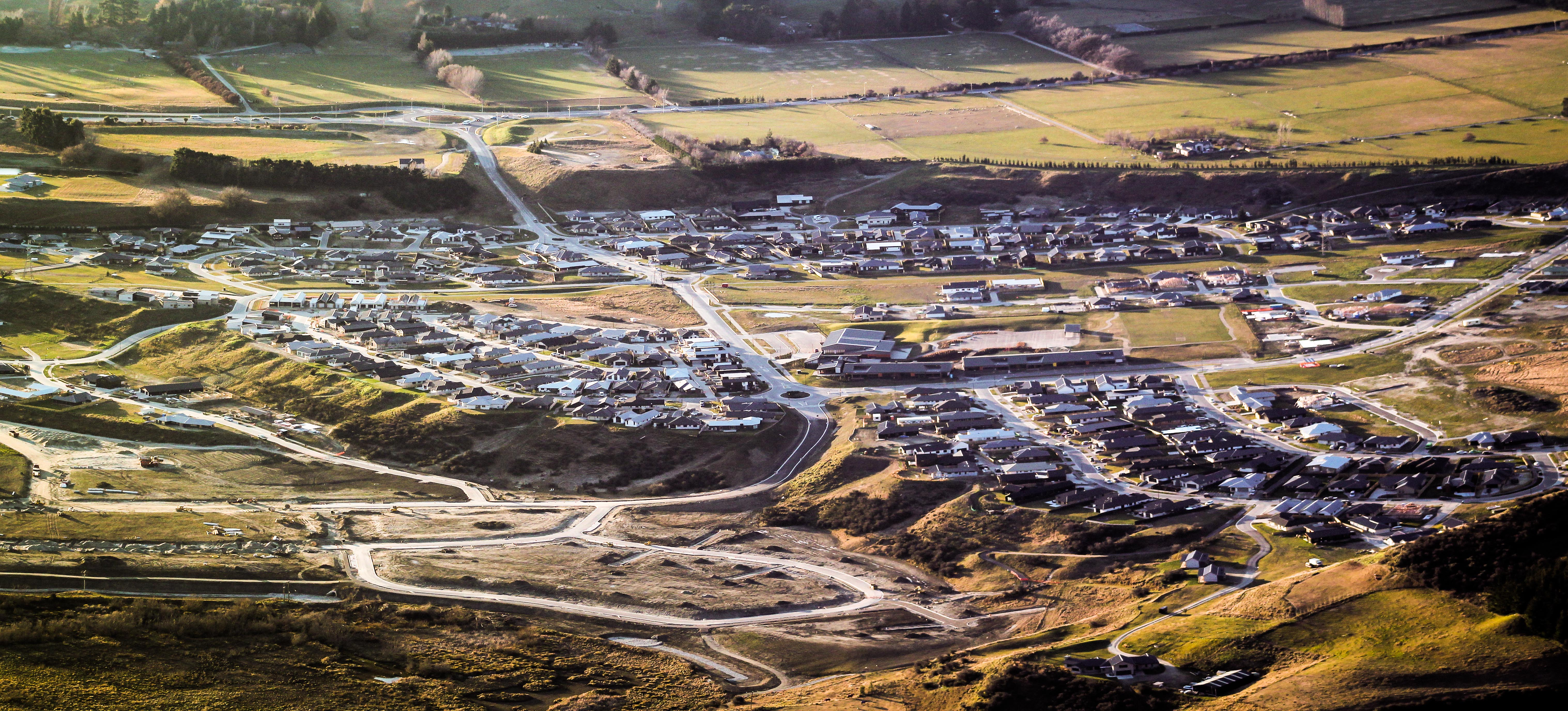
- Shotover Country
- Interactive map of Shotover Country
- Coordinates: 45.007°S 168.772°E
- Country: New Zealand
- City: Queenstown
- Local authority: Queenstown-Lakes District Council
- Electoral ward: Arrowtown-Kawarau Ward

Area
  - Land: 304 ha (750 acres)

Population (June 2025)
  - Total: 4,270
  - Density: 1,400/km^{2} (3,640/sq mi)

Shotover River	Shotover Country	(Lake Hayes Estate)
Shotover Delta	(Kawarau River)

Shotover Country is a suburb of Queenstown in the South Island of New Zealand. It has around 810 sections and was originally 202 hectares (500 acres) when first rezoned from rural to residential. The suburb began in 2012 when sections first came up for sale. The postcode of Shotover Country is listed as Lower Shotover.

It is bordered by the older sub division of Lake Hayes Estate and the Kawarau and Shotover Rivers. The main access point is via the main highway of State Highway 6.

== History ==
The area was originally known as Islay Farm before being named Shotover Country which is inspired from the names of the nearby Shotover River and Lower Shotover area.

Fourteen stages of sections came up for sale in November 2012 with the final stage released in June 2016. By 2019 additional stages had been released and a total of more than 20 had come to market by that time, all marketed by the original owners Grant and Sharyn Stalker. In October 2019 the last of the residential sections went unconditional bringing to an end seven years of development, although some commercial and medium density unit development as still to occur.

In 2016 forty-four homes were built by the Queenstown Lakes Community Housing Trust as affordable houses in the sub-division of Shotover Country. Three quarters of the homes were sold to families under the trust's Shared Ownership programme with the remainder going into the rental scheme.

== Demographics ==
Shotover Country covers 3.04 km^{2} (1.17 sq mi) and had an estimated population of 4,270 as of June 2025, with a population density of 1,405 people per km^{2}.

Historical population
Year	Pop.	±% p.a.
2006	45	—
2013	42	−0.98%
2018	2,187	+120.45%

Shotover Country had a population of 2,187 at the 2018 New Zealand census, an increase of 2,145 people (5107.1%) since the 2013 census, and an increase of 2,142 people (4760.0%) since the 2006 census. There were 633 households, comprising 1,110 males and 1,077 females, giving a sex ratio of 1.03 males per female. The median age was 30.3 years (compared with 37.4 years nationally), with 525 people (24.0%) aged under 15 years, 546 (25.0%) aged 15 to 29, 1,071 (49.0%) aged 30 to 64, and 42 (1.9%) aged 65 or older.

Ethnicities were 74.5% European/Pākehā, 6.4% Māori, 2.3% Pasifika, 14.8% Asian, and 8.8% other ethnicities. People may identify with more than one ethnicity.

The percentage of people born overseas was 44.7, compared with 27.1% nationally.

Although some people chose not to answer the census's question about religious affiliation, 64.6% had no religion, 26.7% were Christian, 1.5% were Hindu, 0.8% were Muslim, 0.8% were Buddhist and 2.5% had other religions.

Of those at least 15 years old, 510 (30.7%) people had a bachelor's or higher degree, and 96 (5.8%) people had no formal qualifications. The median income was $45,700, compared with $31,800 nationally. 378 people (22.7%) earned over $70,000 compared to 17.2% nationally. The employment status of those at least 15 was that 1,242 (74.7%) people were employed full-time, 189 (11.4%) were part-time, and 24 (1.4%) were unemployed.

== Education ==
Shotover Primary School is a co-educational state primary school for Year 1 to 8 students, with a roll of 559 as of March 2026.
