= Mike Cowan =

Professional golf caddie (born 1948)

Michael Thomas "Fluff" Cowan (born February 7, 1948) is a professional golf caddie on the PGA Tour. He is a 40-year tour veteran and one of its best-known caddies. Cowan has caddied for Ed Sabo (1976–1978), Peter Jacobsen (1978–1996), Tiger Woods (1996–1999), Jim Furyk (1999–2024) and Pan Cheng-tsung (2024–present). In 2003, he caddied for then-13-year-old amateur ladies' golfing sensation Michelle Wie for one tournament while Furyk was off due to injury. The Ryder Cup in 2012 was Cowan's 11th, carrying for four different players: Jacobsen, Fred Couples, Woods, and Furyk. Cowan earned his nickname "Fluff" from his resemblance to professional golfer and broadcaster Steve Melnyk, also nicknamed "Fluff."

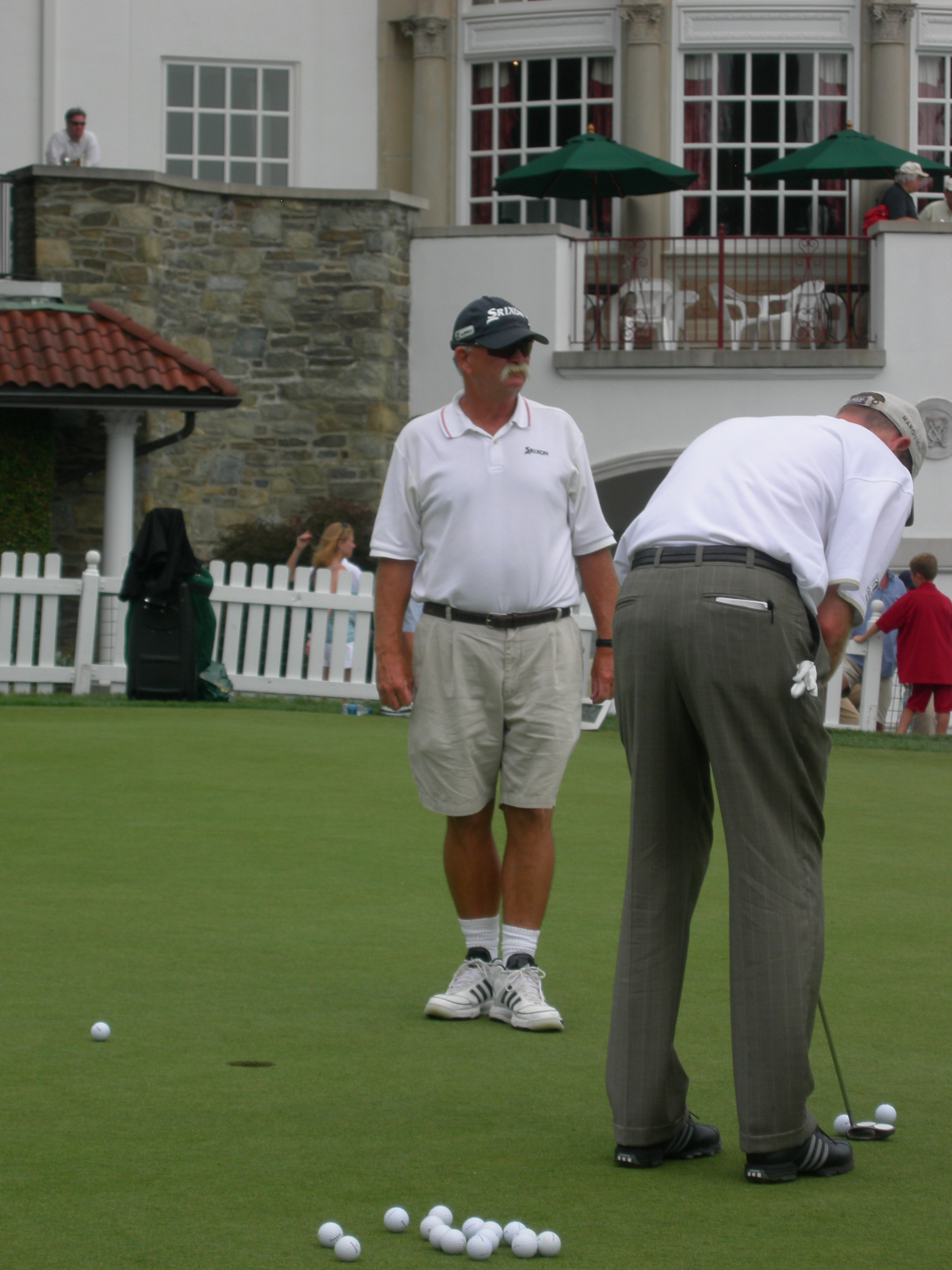
Cowan and Jim Furyk at Congressional Country Club in 2007.

Although he worked with Jacobsen for over 18 years, Cowan's public profile reached its peak while partnered with emerging superstar Woods as his first PGA Tour caddie. Their first tournament together was Woods' professional debut at the Greater Milwaukee Open in September 1996. Cowan was also on Woods' bag for his first major title at the Masters Tournament in 1997, their only major victory working together.

Following the Nissan Open in Los Angeles in February 1999, Cowan was released by Woods in early March for undisclosed reasons, replaced by Steve Williams of New Zealand. However, according to The Washington Post, Cowan was fired by Woods because of a 1999 Golf Magazine interview in which he publicly revealed his salary ($1,000 a week and bonuses up to 10 percent of Woods's winnings). After Woods and Cowan parted ways, he was hired by Furyk, who had just dismissed his previous caddie. Their first tournament working together was the 1999 Masters, and Cowan was Furyk's caddie for his major tournament win at the 2003 U.S. Open. Cowan caddied for Furyk during the 2021 U.S. Senior Open which Furyk won.

In May 2024, it was announced that Cowan would be on Pan's bag full-time on the PGA Tour.

== Personal ==
Born in Winslow, Maine, Cowan was a multi-sport athlete at Lawrence High School in Fairfield and graduated in 1966, then attended William Penn College in Oskaloosa, Iowa, and played for its golf team. He was an assistant pro at a country club in Maine prior to becoming a caddie, and was inducted in the Maine Golf Hall of Fame in 2005.

Cowan is an avowed "Deadhead" (ardent fan of the American rock and roll band The Grateful Dead), and is a member of Congressional Country Club in Bethesda, Maryland, and resides in nearby Rockville with his wife Jennifer and their daughter, Bobbie. He previously lived in Columbus, Ohio.
