= Lake Hayes Estate =

- Town
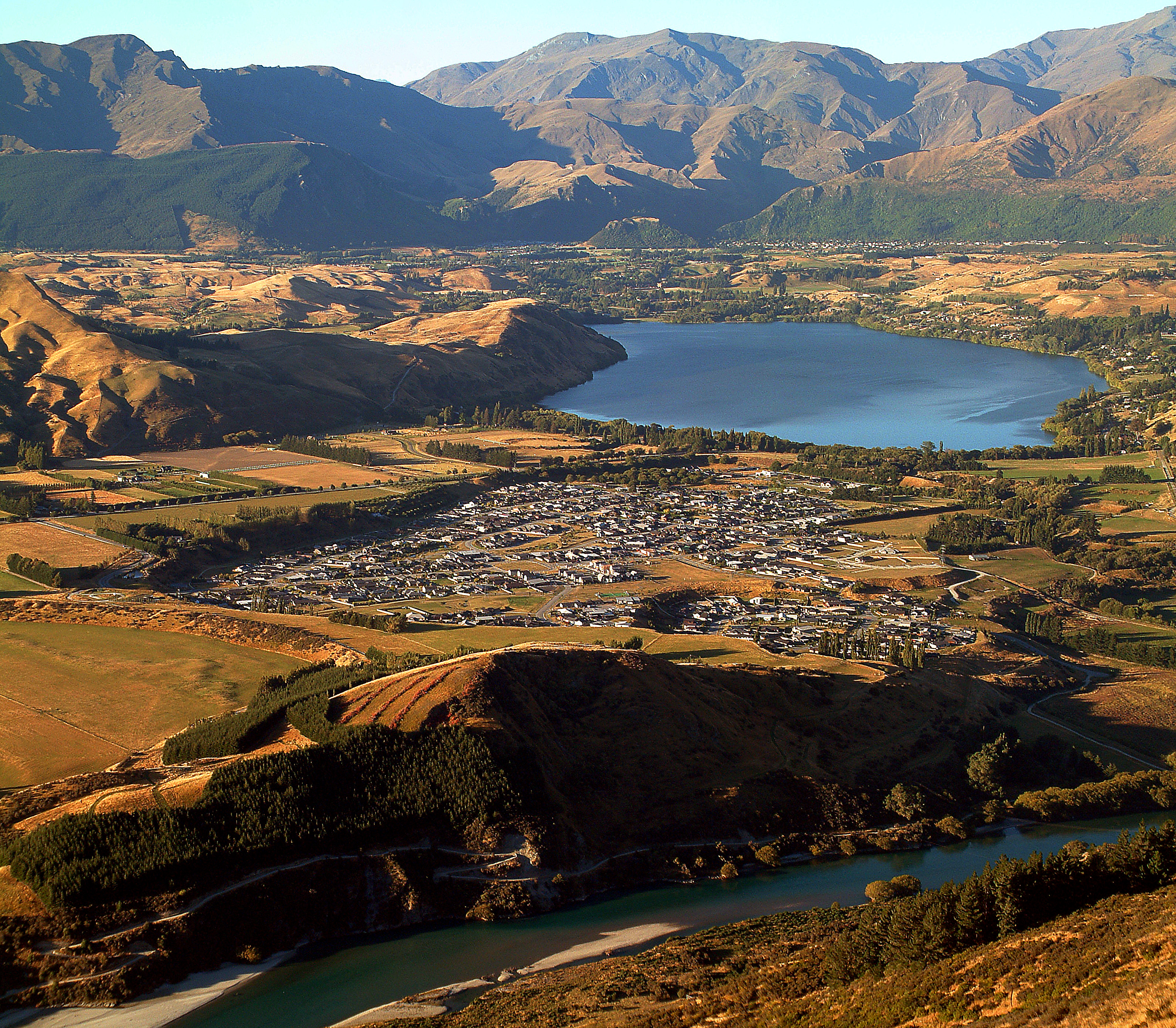
- Lakes Hayes Estate from The Remarkables
- Interactive map of Lake Hayes Estate
- Coordinates: 45.000542°S 168.783592°E
- Country: New Zealand
- Region: Otago
- Territorial authority: Queenstown Lakes District
- Ward: Arrowtown-Kawarau Ward
- Electorates: Southland; Te Tai Tonga (Māori)

Government
  - Territorial authority: Queenstown-Lakes District Council
  - Regional council: Otago Regional Council
  - Mayor of Queenstown-Lakes: John Glover
  - Southland MP: Joseph Mooney
  - Te Tai Tonga MP: Tākuta Ferris

Area
  - Total: 2.74 km^{2} (1.06 sq mi)
- Elevation: 332 m (1,089 ft)

Population (June 2025)
  - Total: 2,860
  - Density: 1,040/km^{2} (2,700/sq mi)
- Time zone: UTC+12 (NZST)
  - Summer (DST): UTC+13 (NZDT)
- Postal Code: 9304
- Area code: 03
- Local iwi: Ngāi Tahu

Lake Hayes Estate (often shortened to LHE) is a town nearby to Queenstown in the South Island of New Zealand. It is named after and situated near Lake Hayes; however, the lake is not visible from most parts of the estate. The population of the town was 2,860 as of June 2025. The main access to Lake Hayes Estate is off State Highway 6. To the west is the newer sub division of Shotover Country which can be accessed via Jones Road.

Lake Hayes Estate was one of the first residential areas of a large scale involving quite flat land near Queenstown, meaning sections were quite sought after. The original 700 sections have virtually all been built on. In 2012 work began on a sub division bordering Lake Hayes Estate called Hayes Creek and by 2016 all of these sections had been sold.

== History ==
For a long time, the area was known as Douglasvale but once residential development began around 1990 by Lake Hayes Estate Ltd it was officially given its current name.

== Demographics ==
Between 2018 and 2023, Statistics New Zealand described Lake Hayes as a small urban area comprising Shotover Country, Lake Hayes Estate and Lake Hayes statistical area. The urban area covered 10.90 km^{2} (4.21 sq mi). Since 2023, Lake Hayes has been included in the Queenstown urban area.

=== Lake Hayes Estate ===
Lake Hayes Estate covers 2.74 km^{2} (1.06 sq mi) and had an estimated population of 2,860 as of June 2025, with a population density of 1,044 people per km^{2}.

Historical population of Lake Hayes Estate
Year	Pop.	±% p.a.
2006	570	—
2013	1,599	+15.88%
2018	2,139	+5.99%

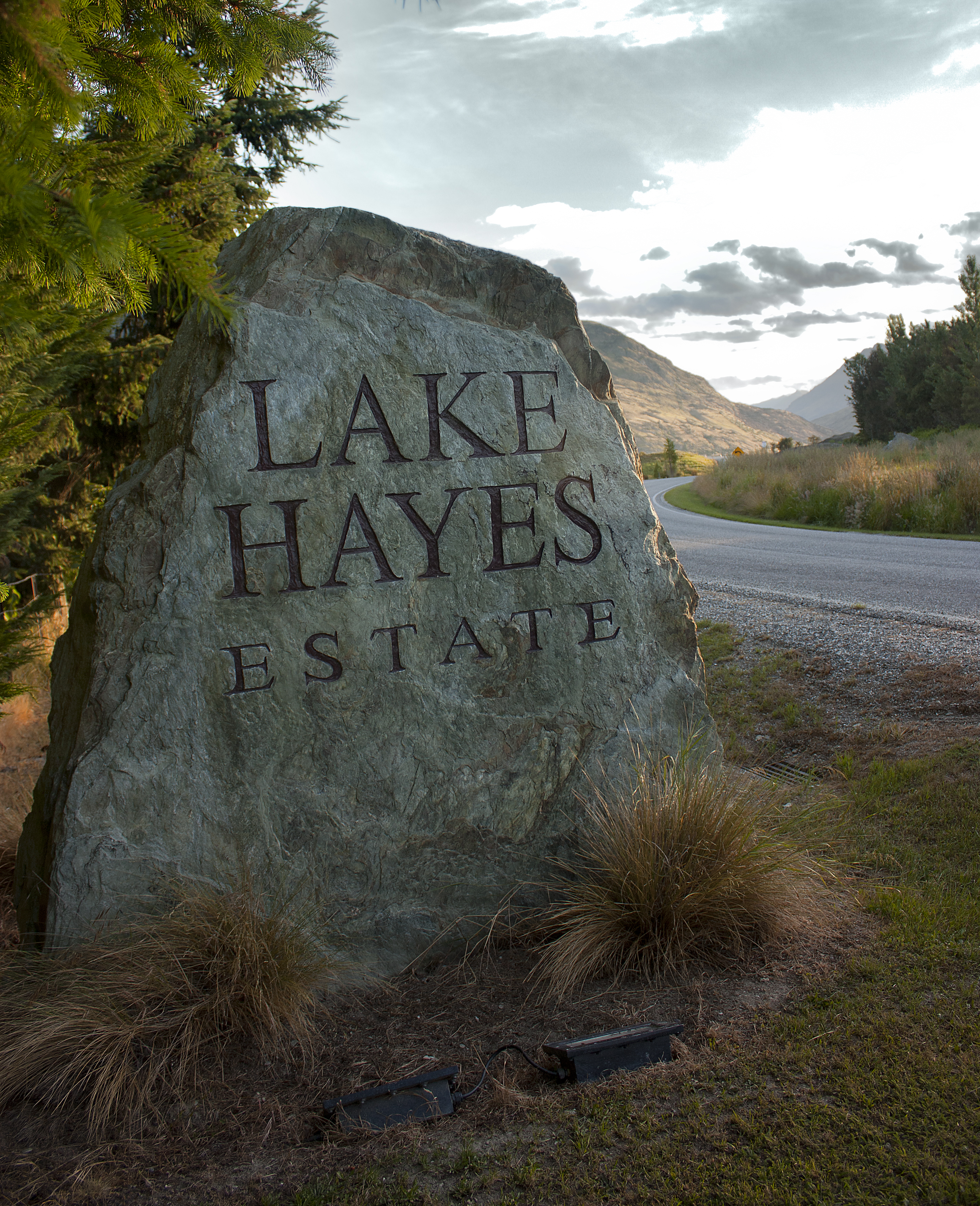
Stone sign at the entrance

Before the 2023 census, Lake Hayes Estate had a smaller boundary, covering 1.94 km^{2} (0.75 sq mi). Using that boundary, Lake Hayes Estate had a population of 2,139 at the 2018 New Zealand census, an increase of 540 people (33.8%) since the 2013 census, and an increase of 1,569 people (275.3%) since the 2006 census. There were 585 households, comprising 1,077 males and 1,062 females, giving a sex ratio of 1.01 males per female. The median age was 32.4 years (compared with 37.4 years nationally), with 573 people (26.8%) aged under 15 years, 417 (19.5%) aged 15 to 29, 1,071 (50.1%) aged 30 to 64, and 78 (3.6%) aged 65 or older.

Ethnicities were 82.9% European/Pākehā, 6.6% Māori, 1.7% Pasifika, 12.3% Asian, and 4.8% other ethnicities. People may identify with more than one ethnicity.

The percentage of people born overseas was 32.0, compared with 27.1% nationally.

Although some people chose not to answer the census's question about religious affiliation, 63.7% had no religion, 26.6% were Christian, 1.8% were Hindu, 0.7% were Muslim, 0.8% were Buddhist and 2.4% had other religions.

Of those at least 15 years old, 411 (26.2%) people had a bachelor's or higher degree, and 126 (8.0%) people had no formal qualifications. The median income was $45,200, compared with $31,800 nationally. 399 people (25.5%) earned over $70,000 compared to 17.2% nationally. The employment status of those at least 15 was that 1,089 (69.5%) people were employed full-time, 255 (16.3%) were part-time, and 24 (1.5%) were unemployed.

=== Lake Hayes ===
The Lake Hayes statistical area covers 5.92 km^{2} (2.29 sq mi) of rural area to the north, east and south of the eponymous Lake Hayes. It had an estimated population of 380 as of June 2025, with a population density of 64 people per km^{2}.

Historical population of Lake Hayes statistical area
Year	Pop.	±% p.a.
2006	252	—
2013	318	+3.38%
2018	354	+2.17%

Lake Hayes had a population of 354 at the 2018 New Zealand census, an increase of 36 people (11.3%) since the 2013 census, and an increase of 102 people (40.5%) since the 2006 census. There were 132 households, comprising 180 males and 174 females, giving a sex ratio of 1.03 males per female. The median age was 49.0 years (compared with 37.4 years nationally), with 57 people (16.1%) aged under 15 years, 36 (10.2%) aged 15 to 29, 198 (55.9%) aged 30 to 64, and 63 (17.8%) aged 65 or older.

Ethnicities were 93.2% European/Pākehā, 5.9% Māori, 2.5% Asian, and 1.7% other ethnicities. People may identify with more than one ethnicity.

The percentage of people born overseas was 23.7, compared with 27.1% nationally.

Although some people chose not to answer the census's question about religious affiliation, 51.7% had no religion, 44.1% were Christian and 2.5% had other religions.

Of those at least 15 years old, 99 (33.3%) people had a bachelor's or higher degree, and 15 (5.1%) people had no formal qualifications. The median income was $52,400, compared with $31,800 nationally. 111 people (37.4%) earned over $70,000 compared to 17.2% nationally. The employment status of those at least 15 was that 156 (52.5%) people were employed full-time, 45 (15.2%) were part-time, and 3 (1.0%) were unemployed.

== Shops and Affordable Housing ==
Nerin Square is a large roundabout situated in the centre of the estate.

In 2014 the first shops appeared in Lake Hayes Estate within Nerin Square which consisted of a restaurant, bar and general store.

A large affordable housing development called Nerin Square is next to McBride Park. It was set up by the Queenstown Lakes Community Housing Trust to help locals into their own homes due to the general affordability of housing in the Queenstown region. Nerin Square was the first major development for the trust, which built 27 homes in the centre of Lake Hayes Estate.

In October 2022, Environment Minister David Parker announced that the New Zealand Government had fast-tracked the Te Pūtahi project at Lake Hayes to build 748 more homes, a public transport area, and a possible school.

== McBride Park ==
McBride Park is one of the central points of the estate and was named after a family of industrious settlers who first lived on the land. In the centre of the estate is a large grassed park which is surrounded by a bike park and bike pump track made of asphalt. There is a mini multi-purpose turf near Onslow Road which is used for basketball, hockey, tennis and football. There is also a large children's playground next to Hope Avenue which includes a variety of activities available including a flying fox and a climbing rock. There is also a public barbecue incorporated with the playground.

== Public Tracks ==
There are a large number of public trails that circle the estate and allow good access throughout the suburb. They are used by walkers, runners and cyclists and connect to the much larger Queenstown Trail. The Lake Hayes Circuit track connects with Lake Hayes to the north via Ada Place. The Twin Rivers Ride to the south connects to Frankton and Gibbston and is accessed via Widgeon Place. The nearby subdivision of Shotover Country to the is linked via the trail network to Lake Hayes Estate.
