= The Clearwater Resort =

Golf course in Christchurch, New Zealand

Coordinates: 43.4464°S 172.5969°E

The Clearwater Golf Club at Clearwater Resort in Christchurch is a par-72 championship course that was most recently the home to the ISPS Handa NZ Women's Open from 2013 to 2016. It was also the former home to both the BMW New Zealand Open and the New Zealand PGA Championship that was staged on the Nationwide Tour. Designed by John Darby in consultation with New Zealand golfing legend, Sir Bob Charles, the course combines elements of links golf inspired by the great Scottish courses with parkland golf, more reminiscent of Florida.

Clearwater hosted the inaugural New Zealand Women's Open in 2009 that was won by Frenchwoman Gwladys Nocera, and at the time, the number-one player in Europe. She won by six shots from four players on eight under par.

The ISPS Handa NZ Women's Open returned to Clearwater in 2013 and was won by Lydia Ko who was playing as an amateur. Lydia became not only the first New Zealand woman to win her national tournament, but also the youngest player to ever win a Ladies European Tour event.

In 2014 South Korean Mi Hyang Lee scored a course record final round of 63 (9 under par) to win the championship by 1 shot from Lydia Ko.

The 2015 ISPS Handa NZ Women's Open featured Lydia Ko, then ranked as the World number 1 player, and Charley Hull who topped the Ladies European Tour Order of Merit in 2014. Record crowds witnessed Lydia Ko set a new course record in the second round, and a career low score for herself, of 61. The three ball of Lydia Ko (61), Charley Hull (64) and Su-Hyun Oh (66) recorded a combined score of 25 under par. Lydia Ko won the tournament to claim the title for the first time as a professional.

In 2016 Lydia Ko returned to claim her 3rd ISPS Handa New Zealand Women's Open title, and maintained her record of never having shot a round over par at Clearwater.
