= 1963 New Zealand Golf Circuit =

Golf tour season

1963 New Zealand Golf Circuit season
- Duration: 29 August 1963 – 28 September 1963
- Number of official events: 7
- Most wins: (Australia) Bruce Devlin (3)
- Money list: (Australia) Bruce Devlin

The 1963 New Zealand Golf Circuit was the inaugural season of the New Zealand Golf Circuit, the main professional golf tour in New Zealand since it was established in 1963.

== Season outline ==
The initial circuit was organised by the New Zealand Golf Association and was held over a five-week period from late August to late September. It consisted of 7 tournaments, 6 sponsored events followed by the New Zealand Open. Two events were held mid-week. There was additional prize money of £300 for the leading players in a points based system, based on performances over the whole series. 10 points were given to the winner, down to 1 for 10th place.

== Schedule ==
The following table lists official events during the 1963 season.

| Date | Tournament | Location | Purse (£NZ) | Winner (Note: The number in brackets after each winner's name is the number of New Zealand Golf Circuit events they had won up to and including that tournament. This information is only shown for New Zealand Golf Circuit members.) | Notes |
|---|---|---|---|---|---|
| 31 Aug | Wiseman's Tournament | Auckland | 2,000 | (Australia) Kel Nagle (1) | |
| 3 Sep | Metalcraft Tournament | Manawatu-Wanganui | 1,000 | (Australia) Ted Ball (1) (Australia) Peter Thomson (1) | New tournament Title shared |
| 7 Sep | Wills Classic | Canterbury | 2,000 | (Australia) Bruce Devlin (1) | |
| 14 Sep | Roslyn Tournament | Otago | 1,500 | (Australia) Barry Coxon (1) | New tournament |
| 17 Sep | Wattie's Tournament | Hawke's Bay | 1,500 | (New Zealand) Bob Charles (1) | New tournament |
| 21 Sep | Caltex Tournament | Wellington | 2,000 | (Australia) Bruce Devlin (2) | |
| 28 Sep | New Zealand Open | Manawatu-Wanganui | 1,000 | (Australia) Bruce Devlin (3) | |

== Money list ==
The money list was based on tournament results during the season, calculated using a points-based system.

| Position | Player | Points |
|---|---|---|
| 1 | (Australia) Bruce Devlin | 55 |
| 2 | (Australia) Peter Thomson | 44 |
| T3 | (Australia) Ted Ball | 38 |
| T3 | (Australia) Kel Nagle | 38 |
| 5 | (Australia) Frank Phillips | 26 |
