= The Cut (magazine) =

New Zealand golf magazine

The Cut is a bi-monthly New Zealand golf magazine. It has become a multiple award winner since launching in August 1999 and focuses on golf features, news and columns along with lifestyle content such as fashion, travel and motoring. Recent changes have included the introduction of a challenging new tuition package. Writers include experienced broadcasters Peter Williams and Brendon Telfer, Tiger Woods’ Kiwi caddie Steve Williams and journalist Marc Hinton.

The magazine was owned by Fairfax Media until December 2015 when Hope Publishing acquired it.
