= Henry Rose (cricketer) =

New Zealand cricketer

Personal information
- Born: 3 September 1853; Hampstead, London, England
- Died: 9 June 1895 (aged 41); Dunedin, New Zealand
- Source: Cricinfo, 22 May 2016

Henry Rose (3 September 1853 – 9 June 1895) was a New Zealand cricketer and golfer.

== Life and career ==
Rose was born in England and attended Repton School and Trinity College, Cambridge, where he won Blues for association football and rugby union. He left England in 1873 and arrived in New Zealand in 1874. He was a businessman who held directorships in several companies in New Zealand.

Rose played five first-class matches for Otago between 1876 and 1884. He was a batsman with an awkward batting style but an effective defence. He also umpired nine first-class matches between 1879 and 1894. He was an office bearer of the Otago Cricketers' Association, whose chairman stated after Rose's death that Rose "had done more financially than any other man to help cricket forward in Otago".

He was runner-up in the inaugural New Zealand Amateur golf championship, played in late 1893, losing to James Somerville in the final. He also represented Otago at rugby.

Rose married Grace Martin in Roslyn, Dunedin, in September 1883. They had five children. He died in June 1895, at the age of 41, from a combination of influenza, tuberculosis and meningitis.
