= Spencer Gollan =

New Zealand sportsman

Spencer Herbert Gollan (22 January 1860 – 27 January 1934) was a New Zealand sportsman who excelled in rowing and golf, and who was also a race horse owner.

Gollan was born at Napier, the son of Donald Gollan, an engineer and surveyor, and Frederica, the widow of Count Charles de Pelichet. He received his education in New Zealand, Switzerland, and at the University of Oxford. He became a racehorse owner in Australia and New Zealand. He was also a golfer who twice won the New Zealand Amateur championship, and was a well-known figure at St. Andrews.

In the spring of 1901, with two professional oarsmen, Tom Sullivan and George Towns, he broke the record for rowing between Oxford and Putney along the River Thames. The distance of a little over 104 miles was covered in 13 hours 57 minutes. The previous record was set in 1889 at (22hrs and 28 minutes). They had the advantage of a good flow on the river and all the locks were in their favour. In 1904 his horse, Moifaa won the Grand National.

Gollan won the New Zealand Amateur championship in 1902 and 1906. In 1902 he beat Charles Gillies 3&1 in the 36-hole final. In 1906 he beat William Harman 8&7 in the final, having been 6 up after the first round.

Gollan was the umpire in the World Sculling Championship match held between New Zealander Richard Arnst, the then Champion and challenger Ernest Barry of England. The match was raced on the Zambezi River near the Victoria Falls on 18 August 1910. Arnst won.

Gollan was a member of Thames Rowing Club and became a vice president of the club in 1914. He was a capable rowing coach to his son Donald Gollan, who rowed in the 1928 Summer Olympics.

On 27 January 1934, Gollan was knocked down and killed by a bus in London. The coroner found that he had stepped out in front of the bus without seeing it, and noted that he was blind in one eye. He was aged 74.
