= Millbrook Resort =

- Location within New Zealand

General information
- Location: Queenstown, New Zealand, 1124 Malaghans Rd, Arrowtown 9371
- Coordinates: 44.9428038°S 168.8180444°E

Website
- Official website

Millbrook Resort is a luxury resort near Queenstown, New Zealand. It is located 4 kilometres to the west of the historic gold-mining town of Arrowtown. The resort covers 650 acres of the Wakatipu Basin - a glacial valley bordered by the Crown Range, The Remarkables and Lake Wakatipu.

The resort includes five restaurants, a bar/café, a spa and a 36 hole golf course.

Millbrook is privately owned by the Ishii family, though individual residences within the resort are owned by a diverse group of investors, largely from New Zealand but also from Australia and around the world.

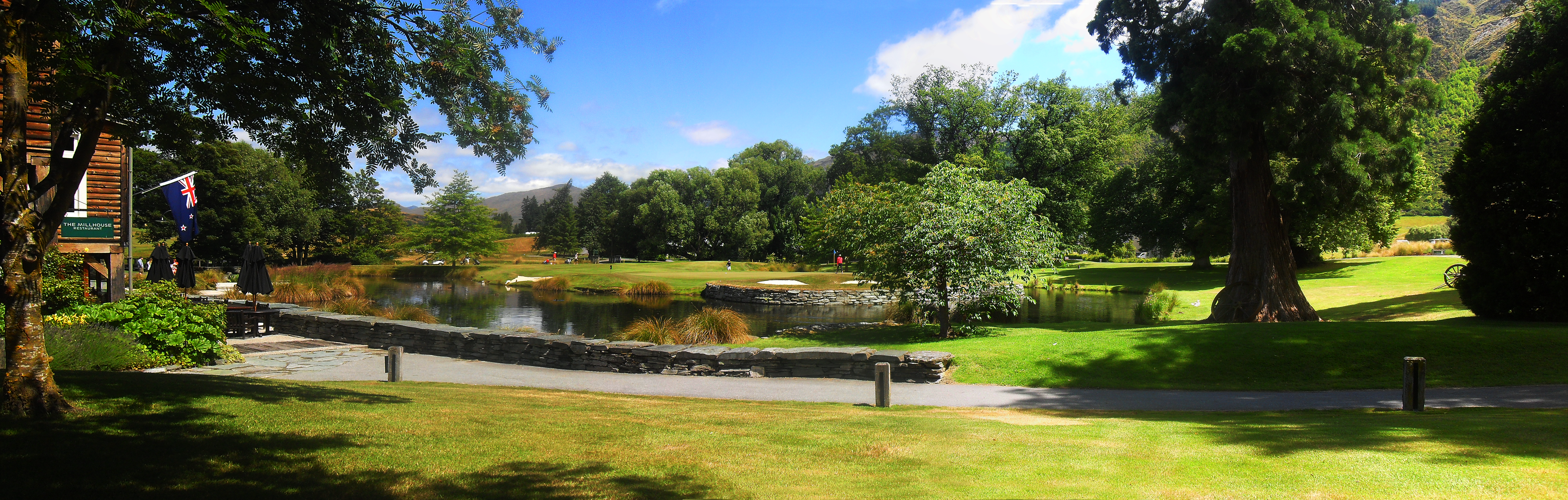
View of part of Millbrook

== Millbrook Declaration ==
In 1995, Millbrook was the venue for a top-level meeting of Commonwealth heads of government, meeting to design a policy programme of the Commonwealth of Nations, designed to ratify the basic political membership criteria of the Commonwealth. The programme was agreed and announced on 12 November 1995.

== Demographics ==
Millbrook is described by Statistics New Zealand as a rural settlement. It covers 3.25 km^{2} (1.25 sq mi) and had an estimated population of 170 as of June 2025, with a population density of 52 people per km^{2}. It is part of the Wakatipu Basin statistical area.

Historical population
Year	Pop.	±% p.a.
2006	84	—
2013	87	+0.50%
2018	123	+7.17%

Before the 2023 census, Millbrook had a different boundary, covering 3.29 km^{2} (1.27 sq mi). Using that boundary, Millbrook had a population of 123 at the 2018 New Zealand census, an increase of 36 people (41.4%) since the 2013 census, and an increase of 39 people (46.4%) since the 2006 census. There were 57 households, comprising 63 males and 63 females, giving a sex ratio of 1.0 males per female, with 12 people (9.8%) aged under 15 years, 9 (7.3%) aged 15 to 29, 57 (46.3%) aged 30 to 64, and 45 (36.6%) aged 65 or older.

Ethnicities were 97.6% European/Pākehā, 4.9% Māori, 2.4% Pasifika, and 2.4% other ethnicities. People may identify with more than one ethnicity.

Although some people chose not to answer the census's question about religious affiliation, 53.7% had no religion, and 46.3% were Christian.

Of those at least 15 years old, 45 (40.5%) people had a bachelor's or higher degree, and 6 (5.4%) people had no formal qualifications. 48 people (43.2%) earned over $70,000 compared to 17.2% nationally. The employment status of those at least 15 was that 39 (35.1%) people were employed full-time, and 21 (18.9%) were part-time.
