= Steve Williams (caddie) =

New Zealand caddy

Steve Williams MNZM
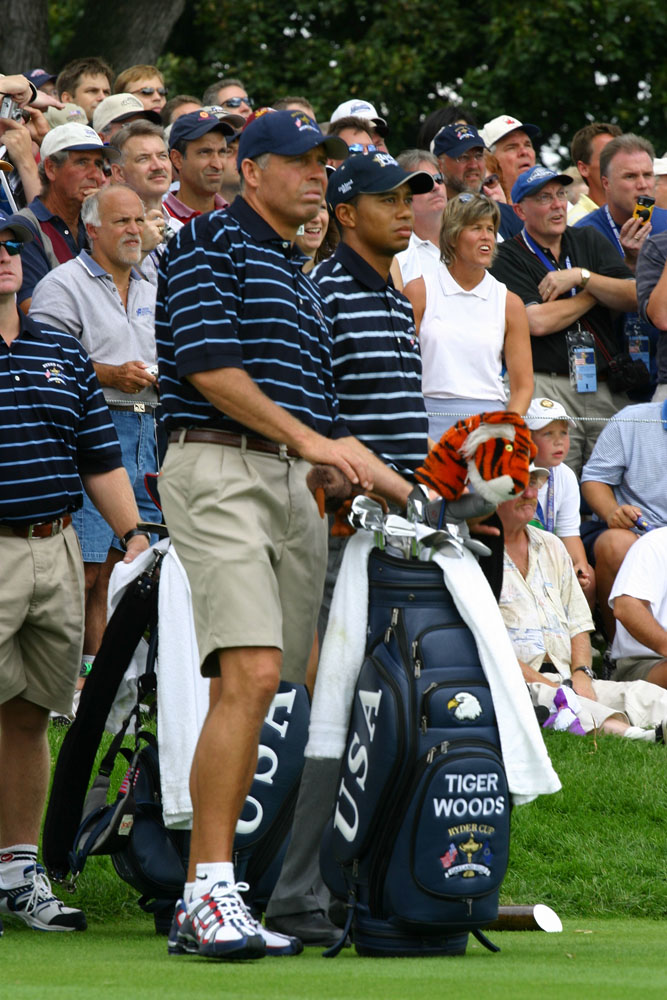
- Williams with Tiger Woods at a 2004 Ryder Cup practice session
- Born: November 29, 1963 (age 62)
- Occupation: Caddie
- Employer(s): Greg Norman (1982–1989); Raymond Floyd (1989–1999); Tiger Woods (1999–2011); Adam Scott (2011–2017, 2022–2023); Danielle Kang (2017); Jason Day (2019)

Steve Williams MNZM (born 29 December 1963) is a New Zealander who has served as a caddie for several top professional golfers, most recently with Jason Day. Williams is best known for working as Tiger Woods' caddie from 1999 to 2011. Woods was the top-ranked golfer in the world for much of Williams' tenure as his caddie.

== Career ==
Williams was born in Wellington. He began caddying at his home club at age 6. By age 10, he was frequently caddying 36 holes on Saturday and Sunday and then practicing his golf game until dark, becoming a two-handicap by age 13. He has said "by the age of thirteen I found myself enjoying caddying more than playing."

In 1976 his father arranged for him to carry the bags of five-time Open Championship winner Peter Thomson in the New Zealand Open. Thomson, who finished third, was impressed with the young Williams, who became his regular caddie when he played in New Zealand. The teenaged Williams also traveled to Australia on school breaks to caddie in tournaments there. In 1979, before he turned 16, he left school and moved to Europe to become a caddie on the European Tour.

Williams spent much of the next decade caddying on almost all of the world's major professional tours. He got steady work with several Australian pros, among them Ian Baker-Finch. During this time, he met Greg Norman, and in 1982 became Norman's regular caddie in all his events in Asia and Australia, as well as some European events. In 1988, Williams moved to the United States to become Norman's full-time caddie. Norman fired him in 1989, and Williams said later that he had gotten too close personally to Norman. Nonetheless, the two remained good friends. Norman later said he had made a mistake and tried to rehire him several years later. Williams had not long stayed unemployed, as Raymond Floyd hired him shortly after. He continued to carry Floyd's bag on both the regular and senior U.S. tours until 1999.

=== Tiger Woods ===
Early in the 1999 season at the Doral - Ryder Open, Tiger Woods' then-coach Butch Harmon approached Williams, asking if he would be interested in caddying for Woods, who had just fired his original tour caddie, Mike "Fluff" Cowan. Harmon had previously asked Raymond Floyd's permission to talk with Williams. After the event, Williams drove to Orlando to interview with Woods, who hired him on the spot. Woods and Williams' relationship extended beyond the golf course, as Woods attended Williams' wedding in New Zealand in 2005 and attended many of Williams' dirt track races. Williams was known to aggressively defend Woods from overbearing fans on the course. At one event, he wrestled a $7,000 camera from a fan who clicked a picture of Woods during his backswing and threw it into a pond.

Woods fired Williams and announced this publicly on 20 July 2011. Williams had caddied for Adam Scott in the 2011 U.S. Open and 2011 Open Championship. Williams released a statement on his website:

Following the completion of the AT&T National I am no longer caddying for Tiger after he informed me that he needed to make a change. After 13 years of loyal service needless to say this came as a shock. Given the circumstances of the past 18 months working through Tiger's scandal, a new coach and with it a major swing change and Tiger battling through injuries I am very disappointed to end our very successful partnership at this time. I have had the opportunity to work of late for Australian Adam Scott and will now caddy for him on a permanent basis. Having started my caddying career with Australian great Peter Thompson and working for Greg Norman in the '80s I am excited about the future working for another Australian.

After his win alongside Adam Scott at the 2011 WGC-Bridgestone Invitational, Williams, in an interview with David Feherty on CBS, said "I've caddied for 33 years — 145 wins now — and that's the best win I've ever had." The following day he expressed regret for the remarks, noting they were "over the top" and saying, "I had a lot of anger in me about what happened (with Woods) and it all came out." It is estimated he earned $12 million working for Woods.

=== Adam Scott ===
With Williams as his caddie, Scott finished runner-up at the 2012 Open Championship, having led by four strokes with four holes to play before bogeying them all to lose the title by one stroke to Ernie Els. The following year Scott won the Masters, defeating Ángel Cabrera on the second playoff hole. It was Scott's first major championship and the first time that an Australian golfer won the Masters.

In September 2017, Williams announced that he would no longer be working in his part-time role with Scott, saying Scott wanted to go back to having a full-time caddie from the start of 2018 onwards. He spent the 2017 New Zealand Women's Open on the bag of Danielle Kang.

Williams ended a semi-retirement and caddied again for Scott in 2022 and 2023, including at the Genesis Invitational in February 2023, where Scott finished tied for 12th. He again caddied for Scott at the 2023 Masters, with Williams saying that it would likely be his final Masters as a caddy; Scott finished tied for 39th in the tournament. Dylan Dethier of Golf.com wrote that Scott used Williams like a "big-game hunter" in the final years of both of their careers, as Scott would ask Williams to carry the bag for only the most-significant tournaments rather than work as an everyday caddy.

== Controversy ==
During an event in New Zealand in December 2008, Williams made news for comments about Phil Mickelson. According to The Guardian, he said, "I wouldn't call Mickelson a great player, 'cause I hate the prick". In a next-day interview with the New Zealand-based Star Times, Williams also said, "I don't particularly like the guy. He pays me no respect at all and hence I don't pay him any respect. It's no secret we don't get along either."

On 4 November 2011, Williams made a comment that was perceived by some as being racist towards Tiger Woods. When asked about the comments he made after Adam Scott's win at Bridgestone, he replied: "It was my aim to shove it right up that black arsehole". Williams made an apology soon after. Tiger Woods then said Steve Williams is "certainly not racist."

== Other interests ==
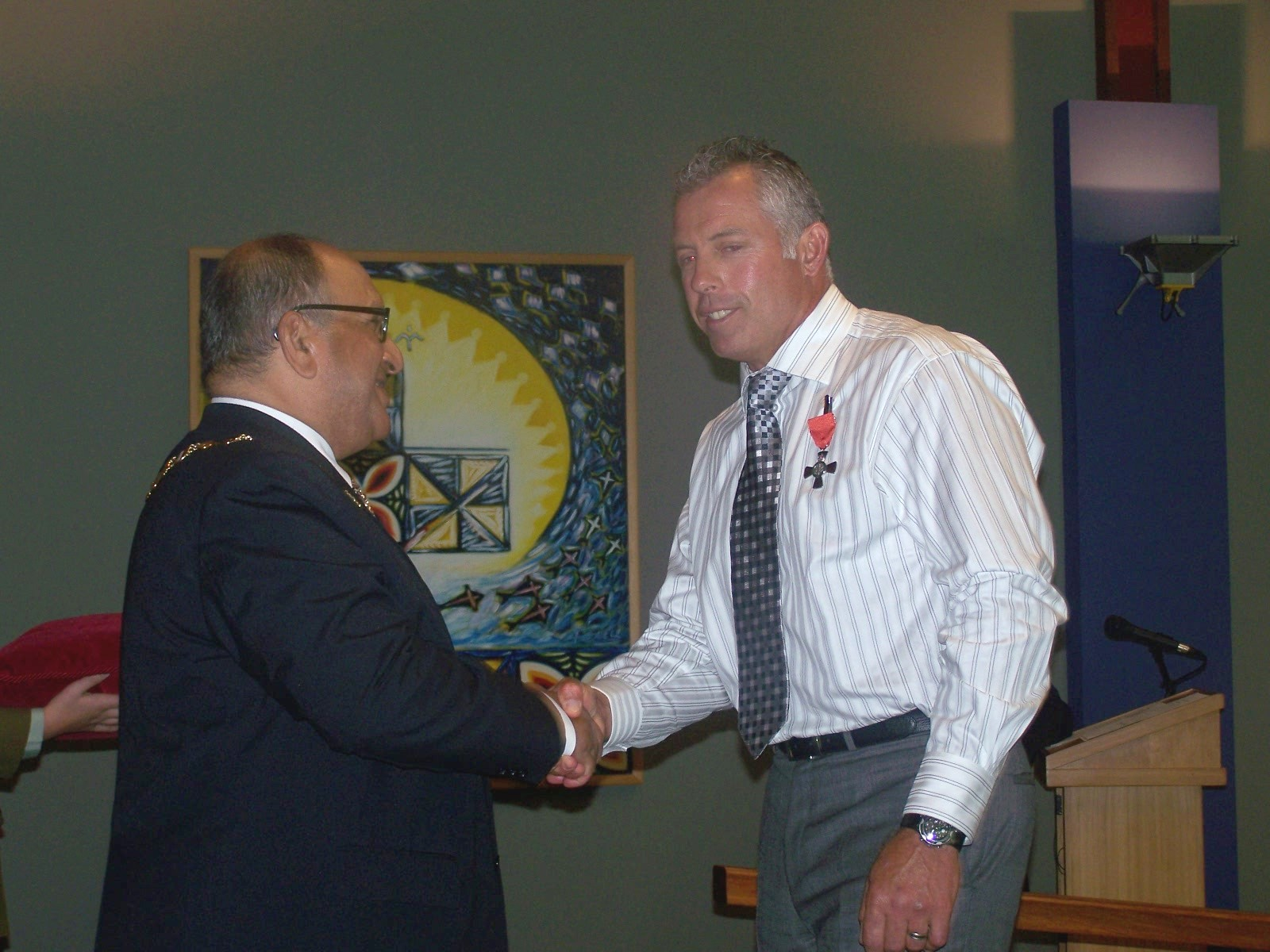
Williams' investiture as a Member of the New Zealand Order of Merit by the governor-general, Anand Satyanand, in April 2008

In 2001, Williams started a charitable foundation to assist junior golfers in his homeland. This charitable involvement was cited in his appointment as a Member of the New Zealand Order of Merit, for services to youth sport and recreation, announced on 4 June 2007 in the 2007 Queen's Birthday Honours. In his free time, Williams also indulges a long-time passion for Speedway Racing, and races a Saloon car and a Super Saloon regularly during the speedway season. He was the national Super Saloon car champion for 2005/2006. He won the coveted Saloon Car title for the 2009/2010 season.

Williams gave NZ$1 million to a cancer ward at Starship Children's Health in 2008.
