= Wakatipu Basin =

- Basin
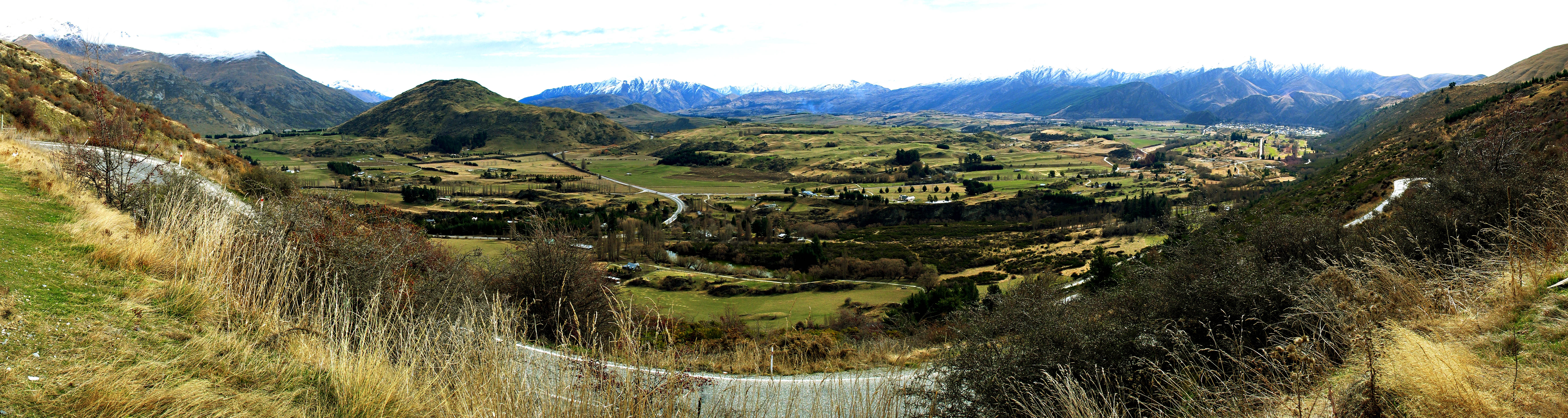
- View from Crown Range looking over the Wakatipu Basin
- Interactive map of Wakatipu Basin
- Coordinates: 44.961°S 168.798°E
- Location: Queenstown-Lakes District

The Wakatipu Basin is a plain surrounded by mountains in Queenstown Lakes District, in the southern South Island of New Zealand.

At the south west corner is found the Queenstown suburb of Frankton and Queenstown Airport. This is where the basin abuts the Frankton arm of Lake Wakatipu. At the northeast corner of the basin is Arrowtown and at the NW corner is Arthur's Point. To the south is found the Remarkables mountain range; to the North is Coronet Peak. The Crown Range forms the eastern boundary of the basin. Located centrally in the basin is Lake Hayes. Much of the basin is drained by the Kawarau River.

The economy of the basin and surrounding areas is largely supported by tourism, though the importance of the vineyards of the Gibbston Valley and Central Otago wine regions has increased since the 1990s.

== Demographics ==
Wakatipu Basin statistical area, which includes Millbrook Resort, covers 57.72 km^{2} (22.29 sq mi) and had an estimated population of 1,460 as of June 2025, with a population density of 25 people per km^{2}.

Historical population
Year	Pop.	±% p.a.
2006	1,020	—
2013	1,158	+1.83%
2018	1,356	+3.21%

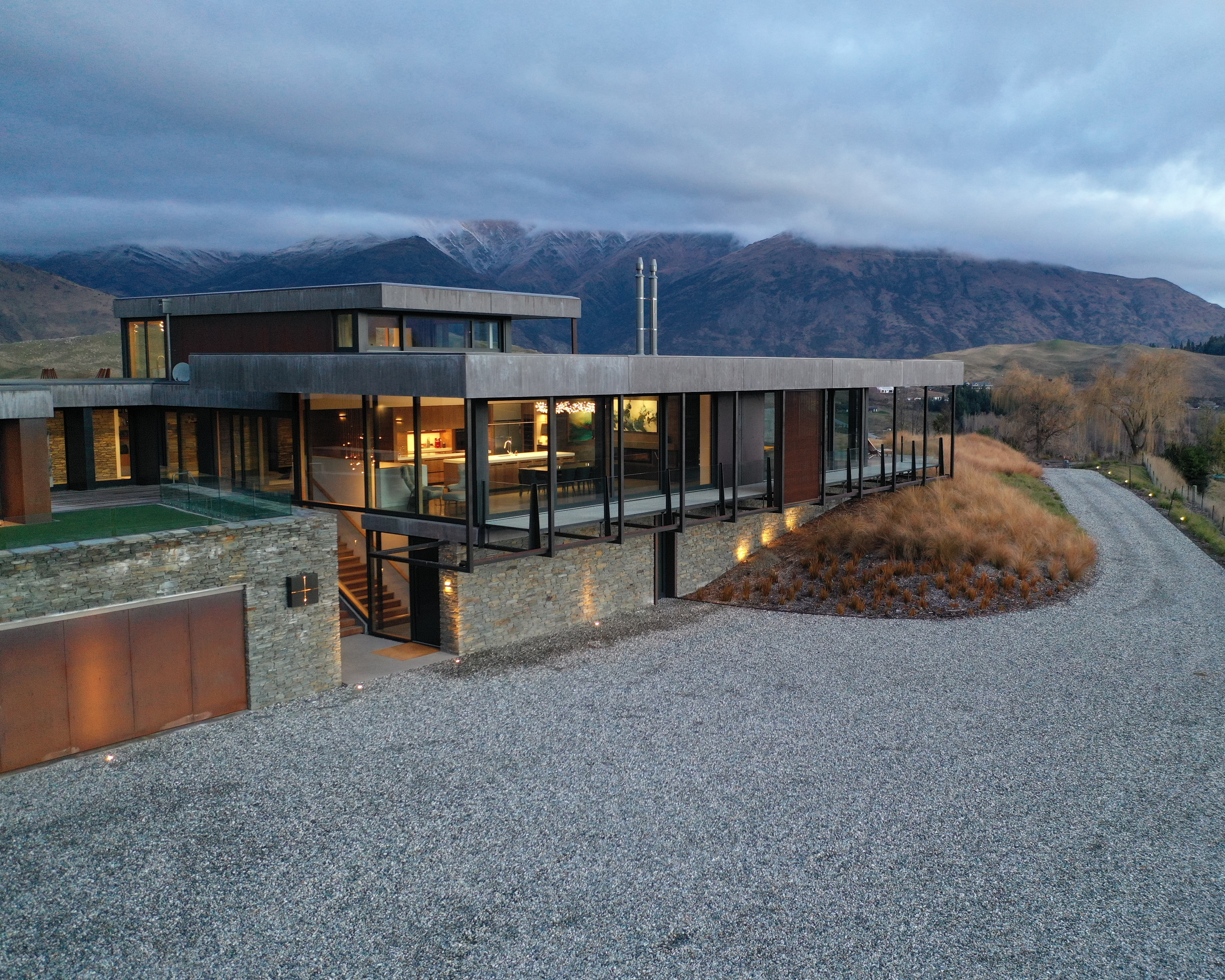
A passive house at Oliver's Ridge

Before the 2023 census, Wakatipu Basin had a larger boundary, covering 59.51 km^{2} (22.98 sq mi). Using that boundary, Wakatipu Basin had a population of 1,356 at the 2018 New Zealand census, an increase of 198 people (17.1%) since the 2013 census, and an increase of 336 people (32.9%) since the 2006 census. There were 483 households, comprising 702 males and 654 females, giving a sex ratio of 1.07 males per female. The median age was 45.7 years (compared with 37.4 years nationally), with 258 people (19.0%) aged under 15 years, 192 (14.2%) aged 15 to 29, 690 (50.9%) aged 30 to 64, and 216 (15.9%) aged 65 or older.

Ethnicities were 92.7% European/Pākehā, 3.5% Māori, 0.2% Pasifika, 2.9% Asian, and 4.6% other ethnicities. People may identify with more than one ethnicity.

The percentage of people born overseas was 26.8, compared with 27.1% nationally.

Although some people chose not to answer the census's question about religious affiliation, 59.1% had no religion, 33.4% were Christian, 0.4% had Māori religious beliefs, 0.2% were Hindu, 0.2% were Buddhist and 1.8% had other religions.

Of those at least 15 years old, 381 (34.7%) people had a bachelor's or higher degree, and 81 (7.4%) people had no formal qualifications. The median income was $52,500, compared with $31,800 nationally. 402 people (36.6%) earned over $70,000 compared to 17.2% nationally. The employment status of those at least 15 was that 594 (54.1%) people were employed full-time, 186 (16.9%) were part-time, and 9 (0.8%) were unemployed.
