= Bernard Wood (cricketer) =

New Zealand cricketer and golfer

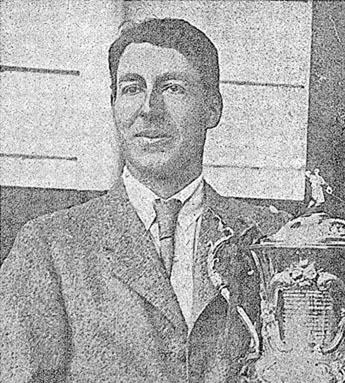
- Wood in 1913, as New Zealand amateur golf champion

Personal information
- Full name: Bernard Bedingfield Wood
- Born: 25 February 1886; Christchurch, New Zealand
- Died: 8 July 1974 (aged 88); Christchurch, New Zealand
- Batting: Right-handed
- Relatives: Joseph Ward (father-in-law)

Domestic team information
- Years: Team
- 1907-08 to 1918-19: Canterbury

Career statistics
| Competition | First-class |
|---|---|
| Matches | 10 |
| Runs scored | 423 |
| Batting average | 22.26 |
| 100s/50s | 1/1 |
| Top score | 108 |
| Catches/stumpings | 4/– |
- Source: Cricinfo, 20 September 2018

Bernard Bedingfield Wood (25 February 1886 – 8 July 1974) was a New Zealand cricketer, golfer and businessman.

== Life and family ==
Bernard Wood was born into a prominent Christchurch business family. His grandfather, William Derisley Wood (1824–1904), founded Wood Bros flour mills in Christchurch. Bernard’s father, William Wood (1858–1921), one of six brothers, founded William Wood and Company in the 1890s, which Bernard took over after his father’s death. William Wood and Company was a trading and manufacturing company dealing mostly in agricultural produce and machinery.

Bernard Wood attended Christ's College, Christchurch. In December 1913 he married Eileen Ward (1886–1952), daughter of Sir Joseph Ward, who had been New Zealand's Prime Minister from 1906 to 1912. The wedding took place at the Basilica, Wellington. The MP Tom Seddon was best man, and the reception was held at the house of his mother, the widow of the former Prime Minister Richard Seddon.

Bernard and Eileen had four children, of whom two boys died of illness in March 1925. When her mother, Lady Ward, died in 1927, Eileen became Sir Joseph’s hostess during his final years in politics, including his return to the premiership from 1928 to 1930.

His second wife, Grace, survived him when he died in Christchurch in July 1974, aged 88.

== Cricket career ==
After successful seasons with St Albans in the Christchurch competition, Wood played his first first-class match for Canterbury on 1 January 1908, scoring a century on debut against Wellington. In the first innings, opening the Canterbury batting, he put on a partnership of 141 for the first wicket with Billy Patrick and 112 for the second wicket with Dan Reese, and finished with 108. It was the only century of the match. A contemporary account noted his mastery over the bowling and the strength of his driving. The Canterbury Cricket Association presented him with a bat in recognition of his innings, which was Canterbury’s only first-class century of the season.

However, he had little further success at first-class level until his last match, 11 years later, when he scored 95 (the highest score of the match) and 25 against Auckland to help Canterbury retain the Plunket Shield in 1918-19. This time he played "orthodox strokes all round the wicket" while his teammates had trouble countering the spin bowling of Sydney Smith. He played his later club cricket with East Christchurch.

== Golf career ==
For a few years Wood gave up playing cricket to concentrate on golf. He won the New Zealand Amateur in 1912 and 1913. He had been runner-up in the amateur championship in 1910 and was also runner-up in the 1912 New Zealand Open. He was a member of the Christchurch Golf Club teams that won the nationally contested O'Rorke Challenge Vase in 1910, 1912 and 1921. The B B Wood Memorial Trophy is contested annually at the Christchurch Golf Club.

Wood was also a prominent polo player in the Canterbury Region.
