= Royal Wellington Golf Club =

Golf course in Heretaunga, New Zealand

Coordinates: 41°08′23.30″S 175°1′15.16″E

The Royal Wellington Golf Club, (formerly Wellington Golf Club) founded on 30 April 1895 is one of New Zealand's golf courses. The Golf Club is situated in Heretaunga, Upper Hutt, just north of Wellington and alongside the Hutt River between Silverstream and Trentham.

== History ==
The Wellington Golf Club was first established in 1895 at Miramar by David Howden (younger brother of Charles Ritchie Howden founder of Otago Golf Club) and Ethel Duncan. It experienced difficulties in renewing its lease in 1904. The Barton family of Trentham and Wairarapa owned extensive land in the Heretaunga area in the Upper Hutt Valley and offered to sell club 48.5 hectares of their estate. This offer was accepted in a Club meeting on 20 November 1906 and subsequently much of the land was cleared and marshes drained to construct the rudimentary course. Some club members donated trees and shrubs in these early years.

By 1908 the club had completed its move to Heretaunga and an 18-hole course had been completed along with a tennis court, croquet and putting green. Its historic and elegant clubhouse was designed by architects Crichton and MacKay. The club was opened in a ceremony on 25 April 1908, by Joseph Ward, Prime Minister and president of the club. In 2004, it was granted a Royal title by the Queen of New Zealand, Elizabeth II.

== Course ==
The course was expanded from 18 to 27 holes in 1972–73. The present championship course was redesigned by Greg Turner and Scott Macpherson and opened in 2013. There is also a nine-hole Terrace course, which takes in some of the most scenic parts of the club's property. Royal Wellington Golf Course is the host venue for the 2017 Asia-Pacific Amateur Championship.

== Championships ==
Seven New Zealand Opens have been held at Heretaunga, the first in 1912, followed by 1932, 1954, 1976, 1981, 1987 and most recently in 1995, when Australian Lucas Parsons was the winner of the sixth and last open held at the club.

== See also ==
- List of golf clubs granted Royal status
- List of New Zealand organisations with royal patronage
