= David McKenzie (golfer) =

Australian professional golfer (born 1967)

Personal information
- Nationality: Australia
- Born: 26 July 1967 (age 59) Melbourne, Australia
- Height: 5 ft 9 in (1.75 m)
- Weight: 170 lb (77 kg; 12 st)

Career
- Sport: Golf
- Turned professional: 1990
- Current tours: PGA Tour Champions; PGA Tour of Australasia; PGA Tour China
- Former tours: PGA Tour; Nationwide Tour; Canadian Tour
- Professional wins: 19

Number of wins by tour
- PGA Tour of Australasia: 1
- Korn Ferry Tour: 1
- Other: 17

David McKenzie (born 26 July 1967) is an Australian professional golfer.

== Career ==
In 1967, McKenzie was born in Melbourne, Australia.

In 1990, McKenzie turned professional. He has played on the PGA Tour of Australasia since then. After twice finishing second, at the 1994 Air New Zealand Shell Open and a playoff loss at the 2004 MasterCard Masters, he won his first Tour event at the 2013 Turner Plumbing Victorian PGA Championship.

McKenzie also played on the U.S.-based Nationwide Tour (2001, 2003–05, 2007–10), winning once, at the 2005 Gila River Golf Classic. He played one season on the PGA Tour (2006), where his best finish was 7th at the Valero Texas Open.

== Professional wins (19) ==
=== PGA Tour of Australasia wins (1) ===
No.	Date	Tournament	Winning score	Margin of victory	Runner-up
1	20 Jan 2013	Turner Plumbing Victorian PGA Championship	−13 (71-69-65-70=275)	2 strokes	(Australia) Scott Laycock

PGA Tour of Australasia playoff record (0–2)

No.	Year	Tournament	Opponent(s)	Result
1	2004	MasterCard Masters	(Australia) Greg Chalmers, (Australia) Richard Green	Green won with birdie on first extra hole
2	2016	Mercedes-Benz Truck and Bus Victorian PGA Championship	(Australia) Ashley Hall	Lost to birdie on first extra hole

=== Nationwide Tour wins (1) ===
No.	Date	Tournament	Winning score	Margin of victory	Runner-up
1	9 Oct 2005	Gila River Golf Classic	−20 (64-67-67-70=268)	1 stroke	(Canada) Jon Mills

=== PGA Tour China wins (2) ===
No.	Date	Tournament	Winning score	Margin of victory	Runner-up
1	8 Jun 2014	Lanhai Open	−16 (68-67-68-69=272)	5 strokes	(Australia) Stephen Dartnall
2	14 Sep 2014	Cadillac Championship	−16 (67-71-65-69=272)	2 strokes	(Australia) Bryden Macpherson

=== Other wins (1) ===
- 2011 Meriton Sydney Invitational

=== PGA of Australia Legends Tour wins (14) ===
No.	Date	Tournament	Winning score	Margin of victory	Runner-up
1	15 Dec 2017	Sunshine Coast Masters (Note: incorporating the Australian PGA Seniors Championship)	−14 (65-67-70=202)	6 strokes	(Australia) Peter Senior
2	3 Mar 2021	Higgins Coatings Legends Pro-Am			
3	5 Mar 2021	Australian Valve Group - Watts Legends Pro Am			
4	7 Nov 2022	Seamless Pymble Legends Pro-Am			
5	9 Nov 2022	Coca-Cola Shelly Beach Legends Pro-Am			
6	9 Aug 2024	Centenary Legends Pro-Am (with Roland Baglin)			
7	3 Oct 2024	Magenta Shores Legends Pro-Am (with Grahame Stinson)			
8	3 Nov 2024	NSW Senior Open			
9	12 Nov 2024	The Australian Golf Club Legends Pro-Am			
10	7 Mar 2025	Gardiners Run Legends Pro-Am (with Michael Long)			
11	29 Sep 2025	New Era Technology East's Legends Charity Pro Am (with Murray Lott)			
12	1 Oct 2025	Austbrokers Wyong Legends Pro-Am			
13	20 Feb 2026	Inner East Community Bank Box Hill Golf Club Legends Pro-Am			
14	23 Feb 2026	Southern Golf Club Legends Pro-Am			

== Results in senior major championships ==
Tournament	2017	2018	2019	2020	2021	2022	2023	2024
The Tradition	–	T34	T39	NT	T6	T26	T36	
Senior PGA Championship	–	T64	T48	NT	CUT	T50	T37	T39
U.S. Senior Open	–	T28		NT	CUT			
Senior Players Championship	–	T54	T30	T48	T52	T50	T53	
Senior British Open Championship	T9	T14	T5	NT	T53		T25	T68

Top 10
Did not play

CUT = missed the halfway cut
"T" indicates a tie for a place
NT = No tournament due to COVID-19 pandemic

== See also ==
- 2005 Nationwide Tour graduates
