= Nick Voke =

New Zealand professional golfer (born 1994)

Personal information
- Nationality: New Zealand
- Born: 15 October 1994 (age 32) Auckland, New Zealand
- Height: 5 ft 11 in (180 cm)
- Weight: 180 lb (82 kg)

Career
- Sport: Golf
- College: Iowa State University
- Turned professional: 2018
- Current tours: PGA Tour of Australasia; Asian Tour
- Former tours: Korn Ferry Tour; PGA Tour China
- Professional wins: 4

Number of wins by tour
- PGA Tour of Australasia: 1
- Other: 3

Nick Voke (born 15 October 1994) is a professional golfer from New Zealand who plays on the PGA Tour of Australasia and Asian Tour. In 2018, his first year as a professional, he won three tournaments on the PGA Tour China and graduated to the Korn Ferry Tour.

== Early life and amateur career ==
Voke was born in Auckland. He represented New Zealand at the 2016 Eisenhower Trophy in Mexico, where his team tied for 6th alongside the United States.

He attended Iowa State University from 2013 to 2017, and played with the Iowa State Cyclones men's golf team where he was an All-American and led the team in stroke average.

== Professional career ==
Voke turned professional in 2018 and joined the PGA Tour of Australasia. He also made his first starts on the Asian Tour, where he finished 3rd at the Shinhan Donghae Open, behind Park Sang-hyun and Scott Vincent.

Starting in September Voke made five starts on the PGA Tour China, where he won three events and finished 3rd in the Order of Merit to graduate to the Korn Ferry Tour, where he spent four seasons from 2019 to 2022. He was runner-up at the Pinnacle Bank Championship in Nebraska.

Back in his native hemisphere, Voke was runner-up at the 2023 Queensland PGA Championship and won the 2025 Webex Players Series Sydney.

In late 2025, he tied for 3rd with Marc Leishman at the BMW Australian PGA Championship behind David Puig and Ding Wenyi, his best finish in a European Tour event.

== Amateur wins ==
- 2012 North Harbour Stroke Play Championship
- 2014 Janney VCU Shootout
- 2016 National Invitational Tournament
- 2017 Hawkeye Invitational, NCAA Austin Regional, Herman Sani Open Tournament

== Professional wins (4) ==
=== PGA Tour of Australasia wins (1) ===
No.	Date	Tournament	Winning score	Margin of victory	Runner-up
1	23 Feb 2025	Webex Players Series Sydney^{1}	−18 (64-63-67-69=263)	1 stroke	(Australia) Jake McLeod

^{1}Mixed event with the WPGA Tour of Australasia

=== PGA Tour China wins (3) ===
No.	Date	Tournament	Winning score	Margin of victory	Runner-up
1	9 Sep 2018	Qinhuangdao Championship	−12 (71-70-69-66=276)	Playoff	(England) Steve Lewton
2	30 Sep 2018	Macau Championship	−19 (66-72-65-66=269)	2 strokes	(United States) Trevor Sluman
3	14 Oct 2018	Clearwater Bay Open	−22 (65-67-67-67=266)	3 strokes	(England) Callum Tarren

== Team appearances ==
Amateur

- Eisenhower Trophy (representing New Zealand): 2016
