= Cory Crawford =

Australian professional golfer (born 1992)

Personal information
- Nationality: Australia
- Born: 11 September 1992 (age 34) Tasmania, Australia

Career
- Sport: Golf
- Turned professional: 2016
- Current tours: Asian Tour; PGA Tour of Australasia
- Former tour: PGA Tour Canada
- Professional wins: 3

Number of wins by tour
- PGA Tour of Australasia: 3

Cory Crawford (born 11 September 1992) is an Australian professional golfer. He won the 2024 Victorian PGA Championship and has won the Papua New Guinea Open twice.

== Early life and amateur career ==
Crawford was born in Tasmania and educated at Hills International College in Queensland, where they have a golf academy, and passed through the Queensland Academy of Sport golf program. He made Sanctuary Cove Golf Club in Gold Coast, Queensland his new base.

Crawford performed well in amateur golf winning the Malaysian Amateur, making the quarter finals of the 2014 Western Amateur in Chicago where he lost to Brian Campbell, finishing runner-up at the 2015 Australian Master of the Amateurs at Royal Melbourne Golf Club two strokes behind Zach Murray, and finishing 3rd at the Keperra Bowl in Brisbane.

== Professional career ==
Crawford turned professional in 2016 and joined the PGA Tour of Australasia, where he won his first title at the 2017 SP Brewery PNG Golf Open. He tied for 3rd at the 2018 Oates Vic Open and the 2021 Victorian PGA Championship. Playing in China, he tied for 4th at the 2018 Xiamen Open and 2019 Hangzhou International Championship.

Crawford then lost several seasons due to back injury, which turned out to be a fracture of the T10 vertebrae. After a stint in the PGA Tour Canada in 2023, Crawford staged a comeback in Australia and won the 2024 Victorian PGA Championship.

In 2026, Crawford earned status for the International Series on the Asian Tour at the LIV Golf Promotions event in Florida.

== Amateur wins ==
- 2014 Malaysian Amateur Championship

== Professional wins (3) ==
=== PGA Tour of Australasia wins (3) ===
No.	Date	Tournament	Winning score	Margin of victory	Runner(s)-up
1	7 May 2017	SP Brewery PNG Golf Open	−10 (71-65-73-69=278)	Playoff	(Australia) Brett Rankin
2	8 Dec 2024	Victorian PGA Championship	−15 (66-67-72-68=273)	1 stroke	(United States) Tyler McCumber
3	17 Aug 2025	PNG Open (2)	−11 (72-72-68-65=277)	4 strokes	(Australia) Will Florimo, (Australia) Ben Henkel, (Australia) Zach Ion, (Australia) Jake McLeod, (Australia) Lincoln Tighe

PGA Tour of Australasia playoff record (1–0)

No.	Year	Tournament	Opponent	Result
1	2017	SP Brewery PNG Golf Open	(Australia) Brett Rankin	Won with par on sixth extra hole

== Team appearances ==
Amateur

- Australian Men's Interstate Teams Matches (representing Queensland): 2014, 2015
