= Todd Sinnott =

Australian professional golfer

Personal information
- Nationality: Australia
- Born: 19 February 1992 (age 34) Melbourne, Victoria, Australia
- Height: 1.91 m (6 ft 3 in)
- Weight: 91 kg (201 lb; 14.3 st)

Career
- Sport: Golf
- Turned professional: 2015
- Current tours: PGA Tour of Australasia; Asian Development Tour
- Former tours: Japan Golf Tour; Asian Tour
- Professional wins: 2

Number of wins by tour
- Japan Golf Tour: 1
- Asian Tour: 1
- PGA Tour of Australasia: 1

Best results in major championships
- Masters Tournament: DNP
- PGA Championship: DNP
- U.S. Open: T31: 2022
- The Open Championship: DNP

Todd Sinnott (born 19 February 1992) is an Australian professional golfer. He won the 2017 Leopalace21 Myanmar Open, his first win on the Asian Tour, winning the first prize of US$135,000. The win came just two weeks after Sinnott finished second in the 2017 Asian Tour qualifying school, losing to fellow-Australian Richard Green at the first hole of a sudden-death playoff.

== Professional wins (2) ==
=== Japan Golf Tour wins (1) ===
No.	Date	Tournament	Winning score	Margin of victory	Runner-up
1	29 Jan 2017	Leopalace21 Myanmar Open^{1}	−14 (72-69-64-65=270)	3 strokes	(Spain) Carlos Pigem

^{1}Co-sanctioned by the Asian Tour

=== Asian Tour wins (1) ===
No.	Date	Tournament	Winning score	Margin of victory	Runner-up
1	29 Jan 2017	Leopalace21 Myanmar Open^{1}	−14 (72-69-64-65=270)	3 strokes	(Spain) Carlos Pigem

^{1}Co-sanctioned by the Japan Golf Tour

=== PGA Tour of Australasia wins (1) ===
No.	Date	Tournament	Winning score	Margin of victory	Runners-up
1	6 Feb 2022	TPS Victoria^{1}	−20 (68-65-65-66=264)	1 stroke	(Australia) Daniel Gale, (Australia) Anthony Quayle

^{1}Mixed event with the WPGA Tour of Australasia

== Results in major championships ==
Tournament	2022
Masters Tournament	
PGA Championship	
U.S. Open	T31
The Open Championship	

Did not play

"T" = tied

== Team appearances ==
Amateur

- Australian Men's Interstate Teams Matches (representing Victoria): 2011, 2012, 2013, 2014 (winners)
