= Paul Sheehan (golfer) =

Australian professional golfer (born 1977)

Personal information
- Nationality: Australia
- Born: 26 January 1977 (age 49) Wollongong, New South Wales, Australia
- Height: 1.86 m (6 ft 1 in)
- Weight: 82 kg (181 lb; 12.9 st)

Career
- Sport: Golf
- Turned professional: 1999
- Current tours: Japan Golf Tour; PGA Tour of Australasia
- Former tour: PGA Tour
- Professional wins: 8
- Highest ranking: 79 (19 February 2006)

Number of wins by tour
- Japan Golf Tour: 3
- PGA Tour of Australasia: 2
- Korn Ferry Tour: 1
- Other: 3

Best results in major championships
- Masters Tournament: DNP
- PGA Championship: DNP
- U.S. Open: CUT: 2010
- The Open Championship: CUT: 2004, 2007

Paul Sheehan (born 26 January 1977) is an Australian professional golfer.

== Early life ==
As a child, Sheehan was a junior tennis champion. At the age of 13, he took up golf. At the age of 16, he broke par for the first time.

== Professional career ==
In 1999, Sheehan joined the PGA Tour of Australasia. He has played consistently on his home tour ever since.

Sheehan plays mainly on the PGA Tour of Australasia and the Japan Golf Tour. He has featured in the top 100 of the Official World Golf Ranking. He has three wins in Japan, including the 2006 Japan Open, and one win in Australia. He has also played on the PGA Tour.

Sheehan finished 20th on the Nationwide Tour money list in 2006, giving him his first start on the PGA Tour.

== Personal life ==
Sheehan lives in Melbourne. He plays at the Victoria Golf Club as a member.

== Professional wins (8) ==
=== Japan Golf Tour wins (3) ===
Legend
Flagship events (1)
Japan majors (2) (Note: The 2006 Japan Open Golf Championship was also a Japan major championship.)
Other Japan Golf Tour (1)

No.	Date	Tournament	Winning score	Margin of victory	Runner(s)-up
1	9 May 2004	Fujisankei Classic	−17 (68-70-62-67=267)	4 strokes	(Japan) Kaname Yokoo
2	5 Dec 2004	Golf Nippon Series JT Cup	−14 (69-65-66-66=266)	4 strokes	(Japan) Katsumasa Miyamoto, (South Korea) Yang Yong-eun
3	15 Oct 2006	Japan Open Golf Championship	−7 (68-70-68-71=277)	3 strokes	(Japan) Azuma Yano

Japan Golf Tour playoff record (0–1)

No.	Year	Tournament	Opponent	Result
1	2003	Bridgestone Open	(Japan) Naomichi Ozaki	Lost to birdie on second extra hole

=== PGA Tour of Australasia wins (2) ===
No.	Date	Tournament	Winning score	Margin of victory	Runner-up
1	19 Feb 2006	Jacob's Creek Open Championship^{1}	−7 (73-70-69-69=281)	Playoff	(Australia) Michael Sim
2	10 Jan 2011	Victorian Open	−8 (69-68-67-72=276)	2 strokes	(Australia) Matthew Griffin

^{1}Co-sanctioned by the Nationwide Tour

PGA Tour of Australasia playoff record (1–0)

No.	Year	Tournament	Opponent	Result
1	2006	Jacob's Creek Open Championship	(Australia) Michael Sim	Won with bogey on second extra hole

=== Japan Challenge Tour wins (2) ===
No.	Date	Tournament	Winning score	Margin of victory	Runners-up
1	11 Jul 2002	Kourakuen Cup (2nd)	−12 (66-66=132)	5 strokes	(Japan) Tatsuya Ohata, (Japan) Hajime Tanaka, (Japan) Ryuichi Tayasu
2	19 Apr 2013	Heiwa PGM Challenge I Road to Championship	−9 (63-72=135)	2 strokes	(Japan) Haruo Fujishima, (Japan) Shoichi Ideguchi, (Japan) Katsumi Kubo, (Japan) Toru Suzuki

=== Australasian Development Tour wins (1) ===
No.	Date	Tournament	Winning score	Margin of victory	Runners-up
1	21 May 2000	Heineken Western Australian Open	−5 (69-70-70-74=283)	5 strokes	(Australia) Craig Carmichael, (Australia) David Diaz

== Results in major championships ==
Tournament	2004	2005	2006	2007	2008	2009	2010
U.S. Open							CUT
The Open Championship	CUT			CUT			

Note: Sheehan never played in the Masters Tournament or the PGA Championship.

Did not play

CUT = missed the half-way cut

== Results in World Golf Championships ==
Tournament	2008
Match Play	
Championship	T61
Invitational	

Did not play

"T" = Tied

== Team appearances ==
Amateur

- Australian Men's Interstate Teams Matches (representing New South Wales): 1996 (winners), 1997, 1998 (winners), 1999

== See also ==
- 2006 Nationwide Tour graduates
