= Perth International =

Coordinates: 31.8616°S 115.7853°E

World Super 6 Perth

Tournament information
- Location: Perth, Western Australia, Australia
- Established: 2012
- Course: Lake Karrinyup Country Club
- Par: 72
- Length: 7,143 yards (6,532 m)
- Organized by: European Tour; PGA Tour of Australasia
- Tours: European Tour; PGA Tour of Australasia; Asian Tour
- Format: Stroke play and Match play
- Prize fund: A$1,600,000
- Month played: February
- Final year: 2019

Tournament record score
- Aggregate: 271 Thorbjørn Olesen (2014)
- To par: −17 as above
- Score: 3 and 2 Ryan Fox (2019)

Final champion
- (New Zealand) Ryan Fox
- Location in Australia Location in Western Australia

The World Super 6 Perth is a golf tournament that was played for the first time in October 2012 as the ISPS Handa Perth International. It is played at Lake Karrinyup Country Club in Perth, Western Australia. It is co-sanctioned by the European Tour and the PGA Tour of Australasia. From 2016 it has also been co-sanctioned by the Asian Tour. It is one of the richest golf tournaments in Australia, with a A$1.6 million purse.

Originally owned by WME-IMG, the tournament, from 2017, switched from a traditional 72-hole event to a 54-hole tournament with two cuts followed by match play.

== Format from 2017 ==
The format used since 2017 is similar to that used for the 2011 Surf Coast Knockout. It retains the 156-player field, with the cut being made at the top-65 and ties after 36 holes. After 54 holes, the field is cut to a fixed 24. The top eight players receive byes, with the tiebreaker being the overall third round score, then the last nine, then six, then three, and then the final hole to break ties. Ties for 24th place are determined by a sudden-death playoff.

On the final day, only six-hole match play contests are played. For matches all-square after the sixth hole, the players returned to a tee near the 18th fairway to play that one hole until a winner is determined. The first round includes the 16 players not receiving byes, randomly paired. In the second round, the eight winners play the eight players that did not play in the first round. There are then quarterfinals, semifinals and a final to determine the winner. Consolation matches are played to determine third through eighth place.

In 2017, the holes used on the final day were the 10th (par 4), 2nd (4), 8th (3), 11th (5), 12th (3), and 18th (4).

== Winners ==
Year	Tours (Note: ANZ − PGA Tour of Australasia; ASA − Asian Tour; EUR − European Tour.)	Winner	Score	To par	Margin of victory	Runner-up
ISPS Handa World Super 6 Perth
2019	ANZ, ASA, EUR	(New Zealand) Ryan Fox	3 and 2			(Spain) Adrián Otaegui
2018	ANZ, ASA, EUR	(Thailand) Kiradech Aphibarnrat	2 and 1			(Australia) James Nitties
2017	ANZ, ASA, EUR	(Australia) Brett Rumford	2 and 1			(Thailand) Phachara Khongwatmai
ISPS Handa Perth International
2016	ANZ, ASA, EUR	(South Africa) Louis Oosthuizen	272	−16	1 stroke	(France) Alexander Lévy
2015: No tournament
2014	ANZ, EUR	(Denmark) Thorbjørn Olesen	271	−17	3 strokes	(France) Victor Dubuisson
2013	ANZ, EUR	(South Korea) Jin Jeong	278	−10	Playoff	(England) Ross Fisher
2012	ANZ, EUR	(United States) Bo Van Pelt	272	−16	2 strokes	(United States) Jason Dufner
