= Peter Campbell (golfer) =

Canadian professional golfer

Personal information
- Nationality: Canada
- Born: January 31, 1983 (age 43) Baddeck, Nova Scotia, Canada
- Height: 5 ft 10 in (178 cm)
- Weight: 160 lb (73 kg)
- Spouse: Jeanne
- Children: 1

Career
- Sport: Golf
- College: Southern Wesleyan University
- Turned professional: 2006
- Current tour: PGA Tour China
- Former tours: PGA Tour Canada; PGA Tour Latinoamérica
- Professional wins: 1

Peter Campbell (born January 31, 1983) is a Canadian professional golfer.

Campbell played collegiate golf at Southern Wesleyan University, turning professional in 2007.

In July 2018, Campbell won the Beijing Championship on the 2018 PGA Tour China by a stroke from Zhang Huilin.

== Professional wins (1) ==
=== PGA Tour China wins (1) ===
No.	Date	Tournament	Winning score	To par	Margin of victory	Runner-up
1	Jul 29, 2018	Beijing Championship	67-64-70-70=271	−17	1 stroke	(China) Zhang Huilin
