= Brad Kennedy =

Australian professional golfer (born 1974)

Personal information
- Full name: Brad Kennedy
- Nationality: Australia
- Born: 18 June 1974 (age 52) Sydney, New South Wales, Australia
- Height: 1.80 m (5 ft 11 in)
- Weight: 80 kg (176 lb; 12 st 8 lb)

Career
- Sport: Golf
- Turned professional: 1994
- Current tours: Japan Golf Tour; PGA Tour of Australasia
- Former tour: European Tour
- Professional wins: 15

Number of wins by tour
- Japan Golf Tour: 3
- Asian Tour: 1
- PGA Tour of Australasia: 6
- Other: 6

Best results in major championships
- Masters Tournament: DNP
- PGA Championship: DNP
- U.S. Open: CUT: 2021
- The Open Championship: T53: 2022

Achievements and awards
- PGA Tour of Australasia Order of Merit winner: 2020–21
- PGA Tour of Australasia Player of the Year: 2020–21

Brad Kennedy (born 18 June 1974) is an Australian professional golfer. He has won three times on the Japan Golf Tour and five times on the PGA Tour of Australasia.

== Professional career ==
In 1994, Kennedy turned professional. He won several minor tournaments in Queensland. In 2003 and 2004 he had a trio of second-place finishes on the European Tour: the 2003 and 2004 Carlsberg Malaysian Opens and the 2004 Madeira Island Open; the first two being co-sanctioned with the Asian Tour, where he was also runner-up in the 2002 Volvo China Open. In 2006 he was third in the Barclays Singapore Open, an important event on the Asian Tour.

Since 2011 Kennedy has played primarily on the Japan Golf Tour where he has won three times. He has also been successful on the PGA Tour of Australasia, winning five times. His most important wins on the tour have been in the New Zealand Open, which he won in 2011 and 2020.

== Personal life ==
Kennedy is married and has two children.

== Awards and honors ==
- Kennedy won the PGA Tour of Australasia's Order of Merit for the 2020–21 season.
- He also earned PGA Tour of Australasia's Player of the Year that season.

== Professional wins (15) ==
=== Japan Golf Tour wins (3) ===
No.	Date	Tournament	Winning score	Margin of victory	Runner(s)-up
1	24 Jun 2012	Gateway to The Open Mizuno Open	−17 (72-68-65-66=271)	3 strokes	(Japan) Toshinori Muto, (Japan) Toru Taniguchi
2	25 Aug 2013	Kansai Open Golf Championship	−10 (69-70-67=206) (Note: Shortened to 54 holes due to weather.)	1 stroke	(South Korea) Park Sung-joon
3	8 Jul 2018	Shigeo Nagashima Invitational Sega Sammy Cup	−12 (71-69-64=204)	3 strokes	(South Korea) Kim Hyung-sung

Japan Golf Tour playoff record (0–1)

No.	Year	Tournament	Opponent	Result
1	2019	Golf Nippon Series JT Cup	(Japan) Ryo Ishikawa	Lost to birdie on third extra hole

=== PGA Tour of Australasia wins (6) ===
No.	Date	Tournament	Winning score	Margin of victory	Runner(s)-up
1	31 Oct 2010	John Hughes Geely Nexus Risk Services WA Open	−10 (69-67-69-65=270)	1 stroke	(Australia) Rohan Blizard
2	4 Dec 2011	BMW New Zealand Open	−7 (68-71-68-74=281)	Playoff	(Australia) Craig Parry
3	17 Feb 2013	Coca-Cola Queensland PGA Championship	−18 (64-62-65-63=254)	2 strokes	(New Zealand) Michael Hendry
4	6 Mar 2016	Holden New Zealand PGA Championship	−22 (70-65-64-67=266)	2 strokes	(Australia) Neven Basic, (New Zealand) Josh Geary
5	1 Mar 2020	New Zealand Open^{1} (2)	−21 (66-69-66-63=264)	2 strokes	(Australia) Lucas Herbert
6	31 Jan 2021	TPS Victoria^{2}	−17 (69-68-62-68=267)	1 stroke	(Australia) Elvis Smylie (a)

^{1}Co-sanctioned by the Asian Tour
^{2}Mixed event with the ALPG Tour

PGA Tour of Australasia playoff record (1–1)

No.	Year	Tournament	Opponent(s)	Result
1	2011	BMW New Zealand Open	(Australia) Craig Parry	Won with birdie on first extra hole
2	2017	ISPS Handa New Zealand Open	(New Zealand) Ben Campbell, (New Zealand) Michael Hendry	Hendry won with par on first extra hole

=== Other wins (4) ===
- 1999 Wynnum Open (Queensland)
- 2000 Bargara Classic (Queensland), Wynnum Open (Queensland)
- 2001 Bargara Classic (Queensland)

=== PGA of Australia Legends Tour wins (2) ===
- 2024 Golf Car Parts & Repairs Brookwater Legends Pro-Am, Sanctuary Cove G&CC Legends Pro-Am hosted by Adam Scott & Peter Senior (with Scott Barr)

== Results in major championships ==
Tournament	2011	2012	2013	2014	2015	2016	2017	2018	2019
U.S. Open									
The Open Championship	CUT	CUT							

Tournament	2020	2021	2022
U.S. Open		CUT	
The Open Championship	NT	CUT	T53

CUT = missed the half-way cut
"T" = Tied
NT = No tournament due to the COVID-19 pandemic
Note: Kennedy only played in the U.S. Open and The Open Championship.

== Results in World Golf Championships ==
Results not in chronological order before 2015.

Tournament	2012	2013	2014	2015	2016	2017	2018	2019	2020	2021
Championship										T61
Match Play									NT^{1}	
Invitational										T43
Champions	T51								NT^{1}	NT^{1}

^{1}Cancelled due to COVID-19 pandemic

Did not play

NT = No tournament
"T" = Tied
