= Kevin Techakanokboon =

American professional golfer

Personal information
- Full name: Kevin Techakanokboon
- Nickname: Tech
- Nationality: United States
- Born: October 26, 1992 (age 34) Artesia, California
- Height: 6 ft 1 in (1.85 m)
- Weight: 218 lb (99 kg; 15.6 st)

Career
- Sport: Golf
- College: Long Beach State University
- Turned professional: 2015
- Current tour: PGA Tour China
- Former tours: Asian Tour; China Tour; Asian Development Tour
- Professional wins: 2

Kevin Techakanokboon (born October 26, 1992), commonly known as Tech, is an American professional golfer of Thai descent who plays on the PGA Tour China.

== Professional career ==
In October 2018, Techakanokboon won the Zhuhai Championship on the PGA Tour China. Winning this event, played at the Zhuhai Orient Golf Club in the city of Zhuhai just north of Macao in the Guangdong province of China, secured his card for the 2019 season. He finished in 19th position in the 2018 Order of Merit.

In May 2019, Techakanokboon won for a second time on the PGA Tour China. In the final round on the Nantong Yangtze River Golf Club, he came from a shot behind at the beginning of the final day, winning a playoff against Steve Lewton with a birdie on the second extra hole.

== Personal ==
To support friends, bolster income and gain additional experience, Techakanokboon has at times caddied for other touring professionals including Chang Yi-Keun and Xander Schauffele.

On April 7, 2019, Arie Irawan, a close friend of Techakanokboon, died suddenly in their shared hotel room during the Sanya Championship on the Island of Hainan. To honor the professionalism and the very positive memory of Irawan, Techakanokboon vowed to improve on self-discipline, focus and dedication to his career.

== Professional wins (2) ==
=== PGA Tour China wins (2) ===
No.	Date	Tournament	Winning score	Margin of victory	Runner-up
1	Oct 7, 2018	Zhuhai Championship	−4 (71-70-66-73=280)	1 stroke	(Japan) Yuwa Kosaihira
2	May 26, 2019	Nantong Championship	−17 (66-73-65-67=271)	Playoff	(England) Steve Lewton
