= Terry Pilkadaris =

Australian professional golfer (born 1973)

Personal information
- Full name: Terry Peter Pilkadaris
- Nationality: Australia
- Born: 30 October 1973 (age 53) Perth, Western Australia
- Height: 1.73 m (5 ft 8 in)
- Weight: 73 kg (161 lb; 11.5 st)
- Spouse: Victoria Moloney

Career
- Sport: Golf
- Turned professional: 1998
- Former tours: PGA Tour of Australasia; European Tour; Asian Tour; Challenge Tour
- Professional wins: 8

Number of wins by tour
- Asian Tour: 3
- Other: 5

Best results in major championships
- Masters Tournament: DNP
- PGA Championship: DNP
- U.S. Open: CUT: 2010
- The Open Championship: CUT: 2007, 2009

Terry Peter Pilkadaris (born 30 October 1973) is an Australian professional golfer.

== Career ==
Pilkadaris was born in Perth, Western Australia. He turned professional in 1998, joining the PGA Tour of Australasia. Since 2002 he has played on the Asian Tour, where he has won three tournaments. He was fifth on the Asian Tour Order of Merit in both 2004 and 2005. He has also played on the European Tour since 2005.

== Amateur wins ==
- 1996 Western Australian Amateur
- 1997 Australian Amateur Medal (tied with Daniel Gaunt)

== Professional wins (8) ==
=== Asian Tour wins (3) ===
No.	Date	Tournament	Winning score	Margin of victory	Runner-up
1	24 Oct 2004	Crowne Plaza Open	−8 (67-69-72-72=280)	1 stroke	(Thailand) Boonchu Ruangkit
2	31 Oct 2004	Sanya Open	−18 (68-66-66-70=270)	Playoff	(United States) Clay Devers
3	26 Jun 2005	Brunei Open	−19 (67-63-68-67=265)	5 strokes	(Australia) Jarrod Lyle

Asian Tour playoff record (1–1)

No.	Year	Tournament	Opponent	Result
1	2004	Sanya Open	(United States) Clay Devers	Won with birdie on second extra hole
2	2004	Volvo Masters of Asia	(India) Jyoti Randhawa	Lost to birdie on second extra hole

=== PGA of Australia Legends Tour wins (5) ===
- 2025 Moama Masters Rich River, Sheen Panel Service Legends Pro-Am, PNG Senior Open, Vuksich & Borich Fiji Legends Golf Classic (with Murray Lott)
- 2026 TLC Healthcare Point Nepean Legends Pro-Am

== Playoff record ==
PGA Tour of Australasia playoff record (0–1)

No.	Year	Tournament	Opponent	Result
1	2011	South Pacific Open	(Australia) Matthew Griffin	Lost to birdie on second extra hole

== Results in major championships ==
Tournament	2007	2008	2009	2010
U.S. Open				CUT
The Open Championship	CUT		CUT	

Note: Pilkadaris never played in the Masters Tournament or the PGA Championship.

Did not play

CUT = missed the half-way cut
