= Papua New Guinea Open =

Golf tournament

PNG Open
Tournament information
- Location: Port Moresby, Papua New Guinea
- Established: 1977
- Course: Royal Port Moresby Golf Club
- Par: 72
- Length: 6,947 yards (6,352 m)
- Tour: PGA Tour of Australasia
- Format: Stroke play
- Prize fund: A$225,000
- Month played: August

Tournament record score
- Aggregate: 265 Daniel Gale (2018)
- To par: −23 as above

Current champion
- (Australia) Josh Armstrong

Location map
- Location in Papua New Guinea

The Papua New Guinea Open is a golf tournament on the PGA Tour of Australasia. The event is held at Royal Port Moresby Golf Club, Port Moresby, Papua New Guinea. It has been a tour event since 2016.

== History ==
In 1978, Papua New Guinea joined the Asia-Pacific Golf Confederation with the intention of adding the Papua New Guinea Open to the Asia Golf Circuit, but attempts were ultimately aborted. That year, the PNG Open had a field of 144 competitors, including 40 professionals, 37 of whom were from Australia.

After a three-year hiatus from 2020 to 2022, the tournament returned in 2023, featuring as the season-opening event on the 2023–24 PGA Tour of Australasia season.

== Tournament conditions ==
In September 2024, an article was released by Monday Q Info, outlining the extremities of the conditions that the players have participated in Papua New Guinea during the PNG Open. It had been noted that the course had been fenced off and guarded by corrupt security guards, as well as caddies being paid $20 a day; with reports suggesting that many players experienced theft of personal items from some caddies during tournaments.

The tournament in recent years has also invited the Prime Minister of Papua New Guinea, James Marape to participate in the tournament.

== Winners ==
| Year | Winner | Score | To par | Margin of victory | Runner(s)-up |
PNG Open
| 2026 | (Australia) Josh Armstrong | 274 | −14 | 2 strokes | (Australia) Lachlan Aylen (Australia) Louis Dobbelaar |
| 2025 | (Australia) Cory Crawford (2) | 277 | −11 | 4 strokes | (Australia) Will Florimo (Australia) Ben Henkel (Australia) Zach Ion (Australia) Jake McLeod (Australia) Lincoln Tighe |
| 2024 | (Australia) William Bruyeres | 271 | −17 | 2 strokes | (Australia) James Conran |
| 2023 | (Australia) Lachlan Barker | 274 | −14 | 4 strokes | (Australia) Jack Murdoch |
2021–22: No tournament
SP Export PNG Golf Open
| 2020 | Cancelled due to COVID-19 pandemic | | | | |
SP PNG Golf Open
| 2019 | (Australia) Peter Cooke | 270 | −18 | 2 strokes | (Australia) Jack Wilson |
| 2018 | (Australia) Daniel Gale | 265 | −23 | 9 strokes | (Australia) Braden Becker (Australia) Tim Stewart |
SP Brewery PNG Golf Open
| 2017 | (Australia) Cory Crawford | 278 | −10 | Playoff | (Australia) Brett Rankin |
South Pacific Export Radler PNG Open
| 2016 | (Australia) Brad Moules | 277 | −11 | Playoff | (Australia) Anthony Quayle (a) (Australia) Aaron Wilkin |

Prior to PGA Tour of Australasia sanctioning

This list is incomplete

- 2015 Josh Cabban
- 2014 Kalem Richardson
- 2013 Pieter Zwart
- 2012 Paul Spargo
- 2011 Matthew Ballard
- 2010 Leigh Deagan
- 2009 Michael Wright
- 2008 Joshua Carmichael
- 2007 Andrew Bonhomme
- 2006 Pat Giles
- 2005 Eddie Barr
- 2004 Troy Kennedy
- 2003 Dean Alaban
- 2002 Chris Downes
- 2001 David Grenfell
- 2000 Kyle Woodbine
- 1999 Eddie Barr
- 1998 Lucas Bimbo
- 1997 Anthony Musgrave
- 1996 Neal Kerry
- 1995 Dale Walsh
- 1994 Mark Officer
- 1979 Gerard Taylor
- 1978 Mike Ferguson
- 1977 Ted Ball

== See also ==
- Open golf tournament
