= Dimitrios Papadatos =

Greek-Australian professional golfer (born 1991)

Personal information
- Nationality: Australia
- Born: 4 June 1991 (age 35) Sydney, Australia

Career
- Sport: Golf
- Turned professional: 2012
- Current tour: PGA Tour of Australasia
- Former tours: European Tour; Asian Tour; Korn Ferry Tour; Challenge Tour; OneAsia Tour
- Professional wins: 5

Number of wins by tour
- PGA Tour of Australasia: 4
- Challenge Tour: 1

Best results in major championships
- Masters Tournament: DNP
- PGA Championship: DNP
- U.S. Open: DNP
- The Open Championship: CUT: 2019, 2022

Achievements and awards
- PGA Tour of Australasia Player of the Year: 2017, 2021–22

Dimitrios "Dimi" Papadatos (born 4 June 1991) is a Greek-Australian professional golfer currently playing on the Korn Ferry Tour.

== Professional career ==
Papadatos turned professional in late 2012. He won his first professional event at the New Zealand Open on the PGA Tour of Australasia in March 2014.

Papadatos has established himself as one of the leading players on the PGA Tour of Australasia with two further victories, the Oates Victorian Open and the TX Civil & Logistics WA PGA Championship seeing him named the 2017 PGA Tour of Australasia Player of the Year.

In 2018, he won the Open de Portugal, his first win on the Challenge Tour. Papadatos would finish 21st on the Challenge Tour's Order of Merit, earning him conditional playing status on the 2019 European Tour.

Papadatos finished runner-up to Mexico's Abraham Ancer in the 2018 Emirates Australian Open, which saw Papadatos qualify for the 2019 Open Championship at Royal Portrush in what was his debut major championship appearance. "I'm ecstatic to have qualified for The Open," Papadatos said. "To get to play with the world's best players is going to be a great experience. I dreamt about playing in The Open growing up."

Papadatos is managed by former NRL star Braith Anasta.

== Professional wins (5) ==
=== PGA Tour of Australasia wins (4) ===
No.	Date	Tournament	Winning score	Margin of victory	Runner(s)-up
1	2 Mar 2014	New Zealand Open	−18 (68-69-67-66=270)	4 strokes	(New Zealand) Mark Brown
2	12 Feb 2017	Oates Vic Open	−16 (68-64-69-71=272)	2 strokes	(Australia) Adam Bland, (Australia) Jake McLeod
3	21 May 2017	TX Civil & Logistics WA PGA Championship	−12 (70-68-70-68=276)	1 stroke	(Australia) Rory Bourke
4	13 Feb 2022	Vic Open (2)	−21 (65-68-68-66=267)	1 stroke	(New Zealand) Ben Campbell

=== Challenge Tour wins (1) ===
No.	Date	Tournament	Winning score	Margin of victory	Runners-up
1	13 May 2018	Open de Portugal	−7 (73-66-73-69=281)	2 strokes	(Portugal) José-Filipe Lima, (France) Antoine Rozner

== Playoff record ==
Korn Ferry Tour playoff record (0–1)

No.	Year	Tournament	Opponent	Result
1	2023	Astara Chile Classic	(United States) Ben Kohles	Lost to birdie on second extra hole

== Results in major championships ==
Results not in chronological order in 2020.

Tournament	2019	2020	2021	2022
Masters Tournament				
PGA Championship				
U.S. Open				
The Open Championship	CUT	NT		CUT

Did not play

CUT = missed the half-way cut
NT = No tournament due to the COVID-19 pandemic

== Team appearances ==
Amateur

- Australian Men's Interstate Teams Matches (representing New South Wales): 2011, 2012 (winners)
