= Fiji International =

Golf tournament in Fiji

Coordinates: 18.1044°S 177.3211°E

Tournament information
- Location: Sigatoka, Fiji
- Established: 2014
- Course: Natadola Bay Championship Golf Course
- Par: 72
- Length: 7,597 yards (6,947 m)
- Tours: European Tour; Asian Tour; PGA Tour of Australasia; OneAsia Tour
- Format: Stroke play
- Prize fund: A$1,250,000
- Month played: August
- Final year: 2018

Tournament record score
- Aggregate: 272 Brandt Snedeker (2016)
- To par: −16 as above

Final champion
- (India) Gaganjeet Bhullar

Location map
- Location in Fiji

The Fiji International was a men's golf tournament in Fiji, originally sanctioned by the PGA Tour of Australasia. The event was Fiji's first internationally broadcast golf tournament to a worldwide audience across more than 30 countries in over 400 million homes, a first for a single sporting event in Fiji.

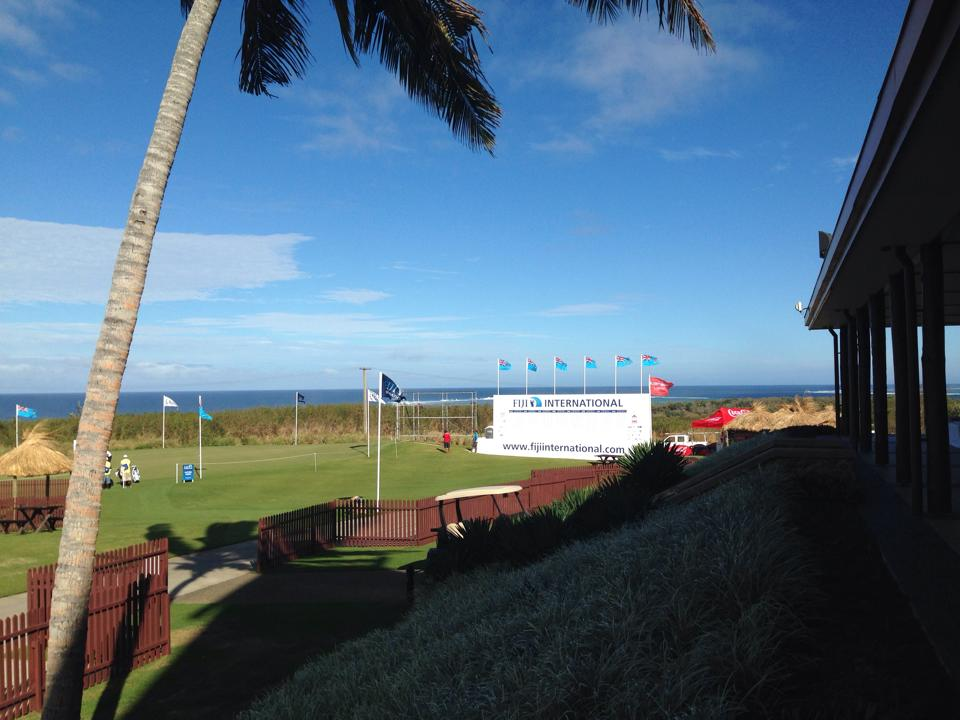
Fiji International at Natadola Golf Course

The inaugural tournament was held from 14–17 August 2014 at Natadola Bay Championship Golf Course. It was a tier one event on the PGA Tour of Australasia and was co-sanctioned with OneAsia. The purse for the event was US$1,000,000. The 2015 event was played in October with a A$1,125,000 purse and was again co-sanctioned by OneAsia.

Beginning in 2016, the event was co-sanctioned with the European Tour. From 2017 it was also co-sanctioned by the Asian Tour. Prize money was A$1,500,000 in 2016 and 2017 and A$1,250,000 in 2018.

== Winners ==
Year	Tours (Note: ANZ − PGA Tour of Australasia; ASA − Asian Tour; EUR − European Tour; ONE − OneAsia Tour.)	Winner	Score	To par	Margin of victory	Runner(s)-up
2018	ANZ, ASA, EUR	(India) Gaganjeet Bhullar	274	−14	1 stroke	(Australia) Anthony Quayle
2017	ANZ, ASA, EUR	(Australia) Jason Norris	274	−14	4 strokes	(Thailand) Jazz Janewattananond (Australia) James Marchesani (Australia) David McKenzie
2016	ANZ, EUR	(United States) Brandt Snedeker	272	−16	9 strokes	(New Zealand) Michael Hendry
2015	ANZ, ONE	(United States) Matt Kuchar	284	−4	4 strokes	(Australia) Aron Price
2014	ANZ, ONE	(Australia) Steven Jeffress	278	−10	4 strokes	(Australia) Jake Higginbottom
