= Anthony Quayle (golfer) =

Australian professional golfer (born 1994)

Personal information
- Nationality: Australia
- Born: 25 August 1994 (age 32) Port Macquarie, Australia
- Height: 193 cm (6 ft 4 in)
- Weight: 82 kg (181 lb)

Career
- Sport: Golf
- Turned professional: 2017
- Current tours: PGA Tour of Australasia; European Tour
- Former tour: Japan Golf Tour
- Professional wins: 2

Number of wins by tour
- PGA Tour of Australasia: 2

Best results in major championships
- Masters Tournament: DNP
- PGA Championship: DNP
- U.S. Open: DNP
- The Open Championship: T15: 2022

Anthony Quayle (born 25 August 1994) is an Australian professional golfer. He plays on the PGA Tour of Australasia, where he has two wins. He finished tied 15th in the 2022 Open Championship at the Old Course at St Andrews.

== Early life and amateur career ==
Quayle was born in 1994 in Port Macquarie, New South Wales. He was raised in Nhulunbuy in the Northern Territory, before attending Hills International College in Jimboomba near Brisbane.

Quayle was runner-up at the 2013 Queensland Stoke Play & Amateur Championship. In 2015, he won the Tasmanian Open, and the Pacific Northwest Amateur in the United States. In 2016, Quayle reached the semi-finals of the Australian Amateur and lost a playoff for the Papua New Guinea Open, a PGA Tour of Australasia event.

He reached a high of 34th in the World Amateur Golf Ranking, and second in Australia's men's rankings.

== Professional career ==
Quayle turned professional in January 2017 and joined the PGA Tour of Australasia where his best result in his rookie season was a 3rd-place finish at the SP Brewery PNG Golf Open. In 2018, he finished T3 at the Oates Vic Open and joined the Japan Golf Tour, where he was runner-up at The Crowns. He was also runner-up at the Fiji International, a European Tour and Asian Tour co-sanctioned event, a stroke behind Gaganjeet Bhullar. On the back of these results, he rose into the top-250 in the Official World Golf Ranking for the first time.

In 2019, Quayle recorded three top-5 finishes in Japan, and in 2020 he won his first professional event, the Isuzu Queensland Open. In 2022, he won the Queensland PGA Championship and was runner-up at TPS Victoria. He was on course for a first Japan Golf Tour victory when he led 2022 Gateway to The Open Mizuno Open by four strokes ahead of the final round. He still held a one-shot advantage playing the 17th, but he was caught by Scott Vincent and then lost the playoff. The runner-up finish gained him an exemption into the 2022 Open Championship at the Old Course at St Andrews, where he tied for 15th.

In 2023, Quayle was runner-up at the Shigeo Nagashima Invitational Sega Sammy Cup, three strokes behind Jbe' Kruger, and tied for third at the Shinhan Donghae Open in Korea. In 2024, he tied for 3rd at the New Zealand Open.

In December 2024, Quayle suffered a seven-shot penalty in the first round of the Victorian PGA Championship at Moonah Links. He was six-under-par for his round with preferred lies being in place on only one hole (hole 3) and not the rest. Quayle was penalised seven shots for every time he lifted his ball on the other holes. He signed for a 73 rather than a 66 after the round. He went on to finish third in the tournament.

== Amateur wins ==
- 2015 Tasmanian Open, Pacific Northwest Amateur, Keperra Bowl

== Professional wins (2) ==
=== PGA Tour of Australasia wins (2) ===
No.	Date	Tournament	Winning score	Margin of victory	Runner-up
1	23 Feb 2020	Isuzu Queensland Open	−15 (67-69-67-70=273)	Playoff	(Australia) Jack Thompson (a)
2	23 Jan 2022	Queensland PGA Championship	−12 (66-72-65-73=276)	2 strokes	(Australia) Daniel Gale

PGA Tour of Australasia playoff record (1–1)

No.	Year	Tournament	Opponent(s)	Result
1	2016	South Pacific Export Radler PNG Open (as an amateur)	(Australia) Brad Moules, (Australia) Aaron Wilkin	Moules won with birdie on second extra hole Quayle eliminated by par on first hole
2	2020	Isuzu Queensland Open	(Australia) Jack Thompson (a)	Won with par on first extra hole

== Playoff record ==
Japan Golf Tour playoff record (0–1)

No.	Year	Tournament	Opponent	Result
1	2022	Gateway to The Open Mizuno Open	(Zimbabwe) Scott Vincent	Lost to par on second extra hole

== Results in major championships ==
Tournament	2022
Masters Tournament	
PGA Championship	
U.S. Open	
The Open Championship	T15

Did not play

"T" = tied
