= Dunes Medal =

The Dunes Medal is a men's and women's Australian amateur ranking event administered by The Dunes Golf Club on the Mornington Peninsula in Victoria. It is contested over 72-holes stroke play.

The first event was played in 1999.

Jason Day, Marcus Fraser and Brett Rumford are player that have competed in this event, with the course record of 9 under 63 being set by Bryden McPherson in the 2008 Dunes Medal.
