= Ken Duke =

American professional golfer (born 1969)

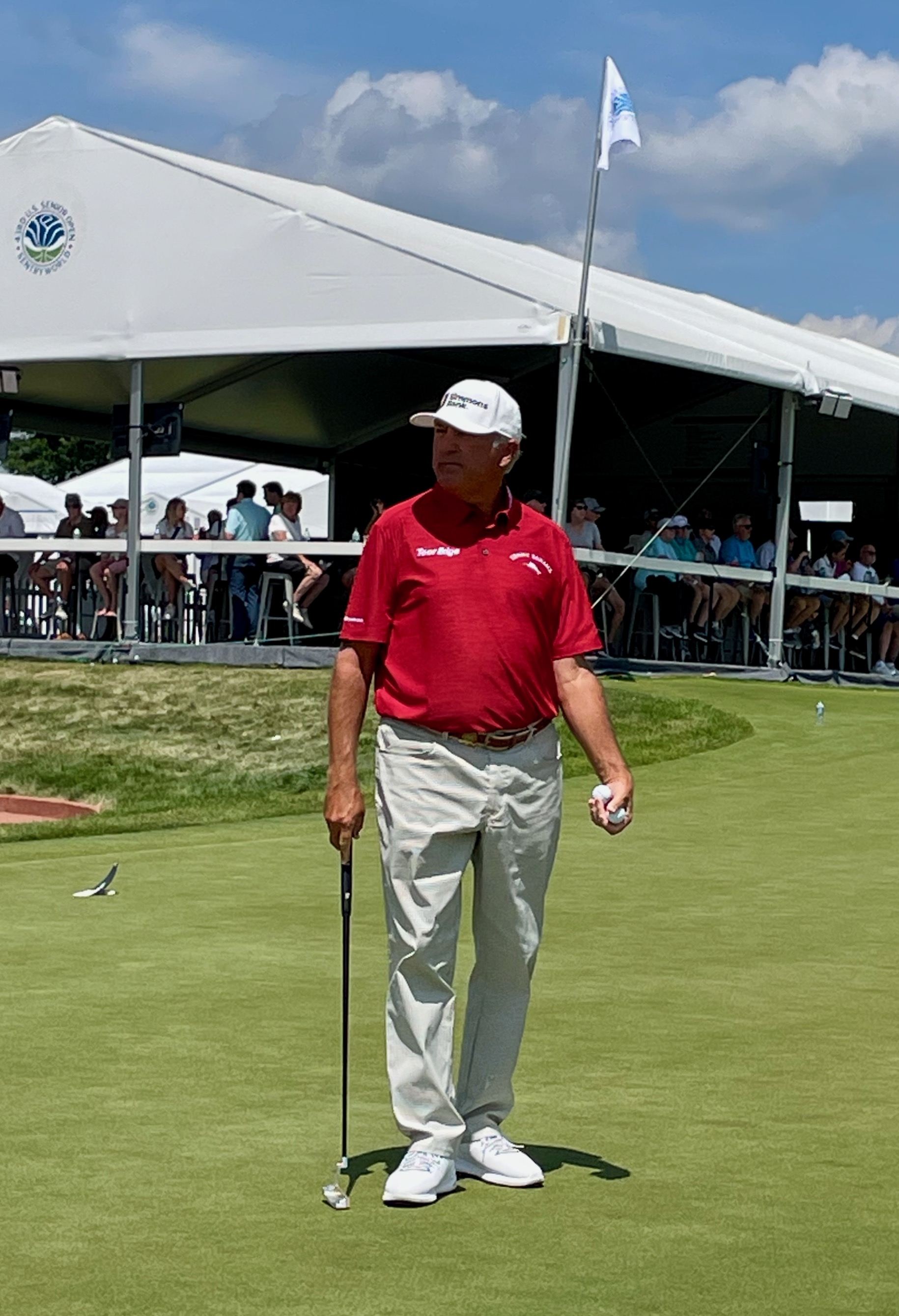
- Duke at the 2023 U.S. Senior Open

Personal information
- Full name: Kenneth Wootson Duke
- Nationality: United States
- Born: January 29, 1969 (age 57) Hope, Arkansas, U.S.
- Height: 6 ft 1 in (1.85 m)
- Weight: 205 lb (93 kg; 14.6 st)
- Spouse: Michelle
- Children: 2

Career
- Sport: Golf
- College: Henderson State University
- Turned professional: 1994
- Current tour: PGA Tour Champions
- Former tours: PGA Tour; Nationwide Tour; Canadian Tour; Golden Bear Tour
- Professional wins: 7
- Highest ranking: 70 (June 23, 2013)

Number of wins by tour
- PGA Tour: 1
- Korn Ferry Tour: 2
- PGA Tour Champions: 1
- Other: 3

Best results in major championships
- Masters Tournament: T35: 2009
- PGA Championship: T13: 2008
- U.S. Open: T23: 2007
- The Open Championship: T64: 2013

Achievements and awards
- Canadian Tour Order of Merit winner: 1999
- Nationwide Tour money list winner: 2006
- Nationwide Tour Player of the Year: 2006

Kenneth Wootson Duke (born January 29, 1969) is an American professional golfer who plays on the PGA Tour Champions. He formerly played on the PGA Tour, with his sole victory coming at the 2013 Travelers Championship.

== Early life ==
Duke was born in Hope, Arkansas, the son of Ray and Bettie Duke. As a seventh grader in Arkadelphia, Arkansas, he was diagnosed with scoliosis; it was determined that his spine had a curvature of over 26 percent, and he wore a back brace 23 hours a day. Duke had surgery two years later after it was determined that his spine had a 51 percent curvature. At Arkansas Children's Hospital in Little Rock, on February 25, 1985, the day of the surgery, Duke's spine was at 72 degrees and worsening. Once a 16-inch metal rod was attached to his spine, the curve of Duke's back was set at 38 degrees, within the range of normal, and that's where it has stayed ever since. Months later, back playing for Arkadelphia High School, he won medalist honors in a high school district golf tournament while wearing a back brace. In 1987, he was the Arkansas High School Medalist at Pleasant Valley Country Club in Little Rock.

== Amateur career ==
Duke played his college golf at Division II Henderson State University. Duke led the Reddies to four straight Arkansas Intercollegiate Conference titles and was a four-time AIC Golfer of the Year. In 1992, he earned NAIA All-American honors

== Professional career ==
After turning professional in 1994, Duke bounced around the world playing mini-tours and on the Asian Tour, South American Tour, and the Canadian Tour. In 1999, he won twice on the Canadian Tour and led their Order of Merit. Duke first played on what was then the Nike Tour in 1995 and qualified for the PGA Tour in 2004, but failed to keep his card and returned to the Nationwide Tour. In 2006 he finished at the top of the Nationwide Tour money list and won the BMW Charity Pro-Am at The Cliffs, which regained his playing rights on the PGA Tour for 2007.

After a slow start to the 2007 season, Duke hit a run of good form in the spring, with four consecutive top 10 finishes, elevating Duke into the top 100 of the Official World Golf Rankings.

At the 2011 Nationwide Tour Championship, Duke secured his PGA Tour card with a win. He jumped from 36th on the Tour's money list to seventh.

On June 23, 2013, in his 187th start and after three runner-up finishes in his career, Duke broke through to win his first event on the PGA Tour at the Travelers Championship. He beat Chris Stroud with a birdie on the second extra hole of a sudden-death playoff. He entered the final round two shots back of the leaders, but shot a final round 66 to take the lead in the clubhouse before Stroud chipped in on the final green to force a playoff. In the playoff, after both players made par on the first extra hole, Duke played his approach to within three feet. Stroud, who was about 30 feet away, could not make a birdie, leaving Duke to convert from three feet for his first PGA Tour victory. He also reached a career-best world ranking of 70th after his win.

In the 2016 Players Championship, Duke shot a 65 during the third round on Saturday May 14, 2016. Conditions were very difficult that day and this round was subsequently viewed as one of the best rounds ever played at TPC Sawgrass. “What course was Ken Duke playing today? Can anyone tell me? Was he playing across the road?” said Jason Day after his third-round 73. “I think that should be the course record.” "The greens were the fastest I've ever putted," said Russell Knox. "I looked up on the board and saw Ken Duke shot 65 and was like, what? That's the best round of golf ever, probably." He finished tied for third in the tournament, winning $504,000.

Duke was one of the last players to retain his Tour card via earnings, an exemption the PGA Tour ended prior to the 2017–18 season. Duke was unable to retain full Tour status after the season and became eligible for PGA Tour Champions in January 2019.

== Professional wins (7) ==
=== PGA Tour wins (1) ===
No.	Date	Tournament	Winning score	Margin of victory	Runner-up
1	Jun 23, 2013	Travelers Championship	−12 (69-68-65-66=268)	Playoff	(United States) Chris Stroud

PGA Tour playoff record (1–0)

No.	Year	Tournament	Opponent	Result
1	2013	Travelers Championship	(United States) Chris Stroud	Won with birdie on second extra hole

=== Nationwide Tour wins (2) ===
Legend
Tour Championships (1)
Other Nationwide Tour (1)

No.	Date	Tournament	Winning score	Margin of victory	Runner-up
1	Apr 30, 2006	BMW Charity Pro-Am	−13 (69-68-68-68=273)	1 stroke	(United States) Jess Daley
2	Oct 30, 2011	Nationwide Tour Championship	−10 (72-68-70-68=278)	2 strokes	(United States) Scott Brown

Nationwide Tour playoff record (0–1)

No.	Year	Tournament	Opponent	Result
1	2006	PalmettoPride Classic	(Australia) Michael Sim	Lost to birdie on first extra hole

=== Canadian Tour wins (2) ===
No.	Date	Tournament	Winning score	Margin of victory	Runner-up
1	May 30, 1999	Shell Payless Open	−16 (64-65-66-69=264)	5 strokes	(United States) Ray Freeman
2	Sep 19, 1999	Bayer Championship	−16 (69-66-69-67=273)	1 stroke	(United States) Arron Oberholser

=== Golden Bear Tour wins (1) ===
No.	Date	Tournament	Winning score	Margin of victory	Runners-up
1	Apr 7, 2005	Champion	−4 (71-67-74=212)	1 stroke	(United States) Adam Fox, (United States) Justin Hicks

=== PGA Tour Champions wins (1) ===
No.	Date	Tournament	Winning score	Margin of victory	Runners-up
1	Aug 20, 2023	Shaw Charity Classic	−14 (66-64-66=196)	1 stroke	(Thailand) Thongchai Jaidee, (United States) Tim Petrovic

== Results in major championships ==
Tournament	1997	1998	1999
Masters Tournament			
U.S. Open			
The Open Championship	CUT		
PGA Championship			

Tournament	2000	2001	2002	2003	2004	2005	2006	2007	2008	2009
Masters Tournament										T35
U.S. Open			CUT					T23		CUT
The Open Championship										CUT
PGA Championship								T18	T13	CUT

Tournament	2010	2011	2012	2013	2014
Masters Tournament					CUT
U.S. Open					CUT
The Open Championship				T64	
PGA Championship			T62	T57	

Did not play

CUT = missed the half-way cut
"T" = tied

=== Summary ===
Tournament	Wins	2nd	3rd	Top-5	Top-10	Top-25	Events	Cuts made
Masters Tournament	0	0	0	0	0	0	2	1
U.S. Open	0	0	0	0	0	1	4	1
The Open Championship	0	0	0	0	0	0	3	1
PGA Championship	0	0	0	0	0	2	5	4
Totals	0	0	0	0	0	3	14	7

- Most consecutive cuts made – 4 (2007 U.S. Open – 2009 Masters)
- Longest streak of top-10s – 0

== Results in The Players Championship ==
Tournament	2007	2008	2009	2010	2011	2012	2013	2014	2015	2016
The Players Championship	T37	T54	CUT			CUT	CUT	CUT		T3

Top 10
Did not play

CUT = missed the halfway cut
"T" indicates a tie for a place

== Results in World Golf Championships ==
Tournament	2009	2010	2011	2012	2013
Match Play					
Championship	T40				
Invitational					T65
Champions					T46

Did not play

"T" = Tied

== Results in senior major championships ==
Results not in chronological order

Tournament	2019	2020	2021	2022	2023	2024	2025	2026
Senior PGA Championship	CUT	NT	CUT	CUT	T55	T57	CUT	CUT
The Tradition		NT	T66	T26	T28	T14	70	T39
U.S. Senior Open	T17	NT	CUT	T18	CUT	T22	T28	
Senior Players Championship	T13	T45	T12	T5	T44	T60	T33	T60
Senior British Open Championship	T10	NT	T35	T20	T14		CUT	

Top 10
Did not play

"T" indicates a tie for a place
CUT = missed the halfway cut
NT = no tournament due to COVID-19 pandemic

== See also ==
- 2003 PGA Tour Qualifying School graduates
- 2006 Nationwide Tour graduates
- 2011 Nationwide Tour graduates
