= South Pacific Open Championship =

Golf tournament

Tournament information
- Location: Nouméa, New Caledonia
- Established: 2011
- Course: Tina Golf Club
- Par: 71
- Length: 6,406 yards (5,858 m)
- Tour: PGA Tour of Australasia
- Format: Stroke play
- Month played: September
- Final year: 2016

Tournament record score
- Aggregate: 268 Andre Stolz (2013); 268 Michael Wright (2013); 268 James Nitties (2015)
- To par: −16 as above

Final champion
- (Australia) Adam Blyth
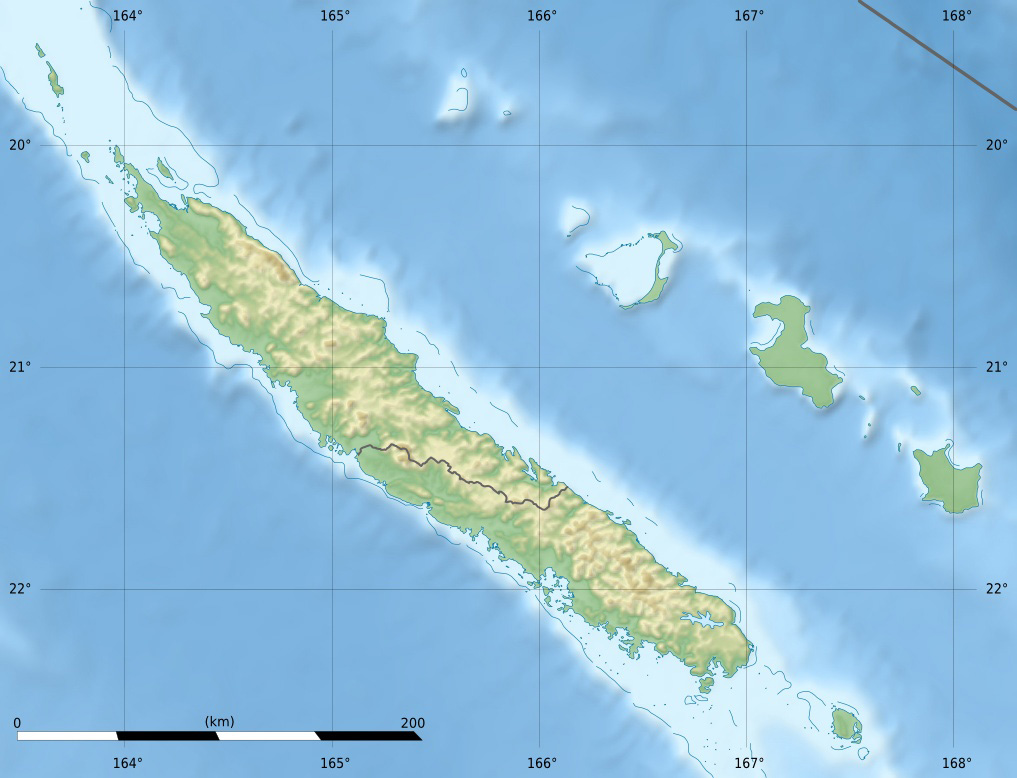
- Location in New Caledonia

The South Pacific Open Championship was a golf tournament held at Tina Golf Club, Nouméa, New Caledonia from 2011 to 2016. It was a Tier 2 event on the Australasian Tour. In 2011, the first year of the event, Tier 2 events did not receive Official World Golf Ranking points. Total prize money was A$110,000 in 2011, A$120,000 in 2012, A$130,000 in 2013, A$140,000 in 2014 and 2016 and A$150,000 in 2015.

== Winners ==
| Year | Winner | Score | To par | Margin of victory | Runner(s)-up | Ref. |
South Pacific Open Championship
| 2016 | (Australia) Adam Blyth | 272 | −12 | Playoff | (Australia) Jake McLeod | |
| 2015 | (Australia) James Nitties | 268 | −16 | 6 strokes | (Australia) Matthew Millar | |
| 2014 | (Australia) Adam Stephens | 269 | −15 | 5 strokes | (Australia) Kota Kagasaki (Australia) Andrew Kelly (New Zealand) Luke Toomey (a) | |
| 2013 | (Australia) Andre Stolz | 268 | −16 | Playoff | (Australia) Michael Wright | |
South Pacific Golf Open Championship
| 2012 | (New Zealand) Brad Shilton | 271 | −13 | 1 stroke | (Australia) Matthew Griffin | |
South Pacific Open
| 2011 | (Australia) Matthew Griffin | 273 | −15 | Playoff | (Australia) Terry Pilkadaris | |
