= Adam Blyth =

Australian professional golfer

Personal information
- Nationality: Australia
- Born: 24 October 1981 (age 45)

Career
- Sport: Golf
- Turned professional: 2004
- Current tour: PGA Tour of Australasia
- Former tour: Asian Tour
- Professional wins: 2

Number of wins by tour
- PGA Tour of Australasia: 2

Best results in major championships
- Masters Tournament: DNP
- PGA Championship: DNP
- U.S. Open: DNP
- The Open Championship: CUT: 2008

Achievements and awards
- PGA Tour of Australasia Player of the Year: 2016

Adam Blyth (born 24 October 1981) is an Australian professional golfer.

Blyth turned professional in 2004. He plays on the PGA Tour of Australasia and also played on the Asian Tour from 2005 to 2013. On the PGA Tour of Australasia, he won twice in 2016: the South Pacific Open Championship and the New South Wales Open. On the Asian Tour, he has three runner-up finishes: 2007 Pine Valley Beijing Open, 2009 Pertamina Indonesia President Invitational, and the 2012 Zaykabar Myanmar Open; where he was defeated in a three-man playoff.

== Professional wins (2) ==
=== PGA Tour of Australasia wins (2) ===
No.	Date	Tournament	Winning score	Margin of victory	Runner(s)-up
1	24 Sep 2016	South Pacific Open Championship	−12 (67-69-65-71=272)	Playoff	(Australia) Jake McLeod
2	13 Nov 2016	NSW Open	−23 (65-63-66-71=265)	3 strokes	(Australia) Brett Coletta (a), (Australia) Jarryd Felton

PGA Tour of Australasia playoff record (1–0)

No.	Year	Tournament	Opponent	Result
1	2016	South Pacific Open Championship	(Australia) Jake McLeod	Won with par on third extra hole

== Playoff record ==
Asian Tour playoff record (0–1)

No.	Year	Tournament	Opponents	Result
1	2012	Zaykabar Myanmar Open	(Thailand) Kiradech Aphibarnrat, (Australia) Kieran Pratt	Pratt won with birdie on second extra hole Aphibarnrat eliminated by birdie on first hole

== Results in major championships ==
Tournament	2008
The Open Championship	CUT

CUT = missed the halfway cut
Note: Blyth only played in The Open Championship.

== Team appearances ==
Amateur

- Australian Men's Interstate Teams Matches (representing Queensland): 2003, 2004 (winners)
