= Surf Coast Knockout =

Golf tournament held in Australia in January 2011

Tournament information
- Location: Torquay, Victoria, Australia
- Established: 2011
- Course: The Sands Torquay
- Par: 72
- Length: 6,691 yards (6,118 m)
- Tour: PGA Tour of Australasia
- Format: Stroke play and Match play
- Month played: January
- Final year: 2011

Tournament record score
- Score: 1 up Scott Laycock (2011)

Final champion
- (Australia) Scott Laycock
- Location in Australia Location in Victoria

The Surf Coast Knockout was a golf tournament held in Australia in January 2011 at The Sands Torquay, Torquay, Victoria, Australia. Prize money was A$135,000.

== Format ==
There were 54 holes of stroke-play over three days with a cut being made at the top-50 and ties after 36 holes. After 54 holes, the field was reduced again to a fixed 32. Ties for 32nd place were determined by a sudden-death playoff.

On the final day a knockout match-play format was used with rounds over just six holes. For matches all-square after the sixth hole, the players returned to a purpose-built tee on the 18th hole to play a 90-metre hole until a winner was determined.

The format was later used for the 2017 ISPS Handa World Super 6 Perth when it switched from a traditional tournament to this format, except that the Super 6 used a fixed 24-player cut with the top eight receiving byes.

== Result ==
Peter O'Malley led the stroke-play part of the event with a score of 200 (−16), four strokes ahead of Andrew Buckle and Daniel Fox. Nine players were tied on 213 (−3) and played-off for the final two places. Ashley Hall and Scott Laycock were the two successful players in the playoff. Laycock was the 32nd seed and met and beat the 1st seed, Peter O’Malley, in the first round. Andrew Buckle beat Leigh McKechnie in one semi-final and Scott Laycock beat Adam Bland in the other. Laycock beat Buckle in the final by one hole.

== Winners ==
Year	Winner	Score	Runner-up	Winner's share (A$)
2011	(Australia) Scott Laycock	1 up	(Australia) Andrew Buckle	18,000
