= Steven Jeffress =

Australian professional golfer

Personal information
- Nationality: Australia
- Born: 25 November 1975 (age 50) Taree, New South Wales, Australia
- Height: 1.81 m (5 ft 11 in)
- Weight: 84 kg (185 lb; 13.2 st)

Career
- Sport: Golf
- Turned professional: 1999
- Current tours: PGA Tour of Australasia; Asian Tour
- Former tour: Japan Golf Tour
- Professional wins: 2

Number of wins by tour
- PGA Tour of Australasia: 1
- Other: 1

Best results in major championships
- Masters Tournament: DNP
- PGA Championship: DNP
- U.S. Open: DNP
- The Open Championship: CUT: 2013

Steven Jeffress (born 25 November 1975) is an Australian professional golfer.

== Career ==
Jeffress was born in Taree, New South Wales, Australia. He turned professional in 1999.

Jeffress has played on the PGA Tour of Australasia, Japan Golf Tour (2009 and 2014), and Asian Tour. He won his first PGA Tour of Australasia event in 2014 at the Fiji International. He is one of the few professional golfers to ever record a hole-in-one on a par 4 in a professional tournament at the 2007 New Zealand Open.

== Professional wins (2) ==
=== PGA Tour of Australasia wins (1) ===
No.	Date	Tournament	Winning score	Margin of victory	Runner-up
1	17 Aug 2014	Fiji International^{1}	−10 (69-70-69-70=278)	4 strokes	(Australia) Jake Higginbottom

^{1}Co-sanctioned by the OneAsia Tour

=== Von Nida Tour wins (1) ===
No.	Date	Tournament	Winning score	Margin of victory	Runners-up
1	29 Jan 2006	National Australia Bank Victorian PGA Championship	−16 (71-68-67-66=272)	1 stroke	(Australia) Marc Leishman, (Australia) Anthony Painter

== Results in major championships ==
Tournament	2013
Masters Tournament	
U.S. Open	
The Open Championship	CUT
PGA Championship	

Did not play

CUT = missed the halfway cut

== Results in World Golf Championships ==
Tournament	2015
Championship	T62
Match Play	
Invitational	
Champions	75

Did not play

"T" = Tied
