= Bryden Macpherson =

Australian professional golfer

Personal information
- Nationality: Australia
- Born: 7 August 1990 (age 36) Melbourne, Australia
- Height: 5 ft 10 in (1.78 m)
- Weight: 150 lb (68 kg; 11 st)

Career
- Sport: Golf
- College: University of Georgia
- Turned professional: 2012
- Current tours: Web.com Tour; PGA Tour of Australasia
- Former tours: OneAsia Tour; PGA Tour China
- Professional wins: 5

Number of wins by tour
- PGA Tour of Australasia: 2
- Other: 3

Best results in major championships
- Masters Tournament: CUT: 2012
- PGA Championship: DNP
- U.S. Open: DNP
- The Open Championship: CUT: 2011, 2014

Achievements and awards
- PGA Tour China Order of Merit winner: 2015

Bryden Macpherson (born 7 August 1990) is an Australian professional golfer best known for winning The Amateur Championship in 2011.

== Amateur career ==
Macpherson was born in Melbourne, Australia. He won the Dunes Medal in 2008, an amateur event in Australia, and set two course records in the process, shooting a 64 and then bettering it with a 63. He enrolled at the University of Georgia in 2009 and was named Southeastern Conference Freshman of the Year and was also named to the second All-SEC team. He also won the Australian Amateur Stroke Play and the New Zealand Amateur Stroke Play in 2009. In 2010, he represented his country for the Eisenhower Trophy, the premier world amateur team golf championship. Macpherson won The Amateur Championship in 2011. This victory earned him a spot in the 2011 Open Championship and the 2012 Masters Tournament. He missed the cut at the Open by a stroke.

== Professional career ==
Macpherson turned professional following the 2012 Masters Tournament. By doing so, he forfeited his invitation to the 2012 U.S. Open.

He qualified for the 2014 Open Championship after a T-4 finish at the 2013 Australian Open. (The Australian Open was an International Qualifying Tournament for The Open.) He missed the cut after rounds of 90 and 80, leaving him 26-over-par. His round of 90 was the highest score in the opening round for 15 years.

Macpherson had status on three different professional tours for 2014 (PGA Tour China, PGA Tour of Australasia, OneAsia Tour). He was the first active PGA Tour China member to play in a major. Macpherson qualified for the Web.com Tour for the 2015 season. After failing to retain his Web.com Tour privileges, he returned to PGA Tour China where he won twice and finished the season leading the Order of Merit, earning him a return to the Web.com Tour for 2016. Macpherson had a disappointing 2016 season, lost his Web.com Tour card and played on the China Tour in 2017, winning the Fragrant Hills Beijing Open and finishing second in the Order of Merit.

== Amateur wins ==
- 2008 Dunes Medal
- 2009 Australian Amateur Stroke Play, New Zealand Amateur Stroke Play
- 2011 The Amateur Championship
- 2012 Georgia Cup

== Professional wins (5) ==
=== PGA Tour of Australasia wins (2) ===
No.	Date	Tournament	Winning score	Margin of victory	Runner(s)-up
1	11 Feb 2021	Moonah Links PGA Classic	−18 (69-69-68-64=270)	1 stroke	(Australia) Justin Warren
2	28 Mar 2021	Golf Challenge NSW Open	−18 (66-67-65-68=266)	3 strokes	(Australia) Elvis Smylie, (Australia) Jack Thompson

=== China Tour wins (3) ===
No.	Date	Tournament	Winning score	Margin of victory	Runner(s)-up
1	27 Sep 2015	Cadillac Championship	−16 (72-63-69-68=272)	3 strokes	(South Korea) Cho Byung-min
2	11 Oct 2015	Lushan Open	−8 (68-68-68-68=272)	3 strokes	(United States) T. K. Kim, (United States) Sejun Yoon
3	25 Jun 2017	Fragrant Hills Beijing Open	−14 (71-66-69-64=270)	Playoff	(South Korea) Cho Rak-hyun

== Playoff record ==
Asian Tour playoff record (0–1)

No.	Year	Tournament	Opponent	Result
1	2017	KG S&H City Asian Golf Championship	(China) Xiao Bowen	Lost to birdie on second extra hole

== Results in major championships ==
Tournament	2011	2012	2013	2014
Masters Tournament		CUT		
U.S. Open				
The Open Championship	CUT			CUT
PGA Championship				

Did not play

CUT = missed the half-way cut
"T" = tied

== Team appearances ==
Amateur

- Nomura Cup (representing Australia): 2009
- Eisenhower Trophy (representing Australia): 2010
- Australian Men's Interstate Teams Matches (representing Victoria): 2008 (winners), 2009 (winners)
