= 2014 PGA Tour of Australasia =

Golf tour season

2014 PGA Tour of Australasia season
- Duration: 6 January 2014 – 14 December 2014
- Number of official events: 15
- Order of Merit: (Australia) Greg Chalmers

The 2014 PGA Tour of Australasia was the 41st season on the PGA Tour of Australasia, the main professional golf tour in Australia and New Zealand since it was formed in 1973.

== Schedule ==
The following table lists official events during the 2014 season.

Date	Tournament	Location	Purse (A$)	Winner (Note: The number in brackets after each winner's name is the number of PGA Tour of Australasia events they had won up to and including that tournament. This information is only shown for PGA Tour of Australasia members.)	OWGR points	Other tours (Note: EUR − European Tour; ONE − OneAsia Tour.)	Notes
9 Feb	Lexus of Blackburn Victorian PGA Championship	Victoria	100,000	(New Zealand) Gareth Paddison (4)	6		
16 Feb	Coca-Cola Queensland PGA Championship	Queensland	120,000	(Australia) Anthony Summers (1)	6		
23 Feb	Oates Victorian Open Championship	Victoria	150,000	(Australia) Matthew Griffin (2)	6		
2 Mar	New Zealand Open	New Zealand	NZ$900,000	(Australia) Dimitrios Papadatos (1)	16		
17 Aug	Fiji International	Fiji	US$1,000,000	(Australia) Steven Jeffress (1)	12	ONE	New tournament
31 Aug	Isuzu Queensland Open	Queensland	110,000	(Australia) Andrew Dodt (1)	6		
13 Sep	South Pacific Open Championship	New Caledonia	140,000	(Australia) Adam Stephens (1)	6		
19 Oct	John Hughes/Nexus Risk Services WA Open	Western Australia	110,000	(New Zealand) Ryan Fox (1)	6		
26 Oct	ISPS Handa Perth International	Western Australia	1,750,000	(Denmark) Thorbjørn Olesen (n/a)	22	EUR	
2 Nov	WA Goldfields PGA Championship	Western Australia	110,000	(Australia) Ryan Lynch (1)	6		
16 Nov	Mazda NSW Open	New South Wales	100,000	(Australia) Anthony Brown (1)	6		
23 Nov	BetEasy Masters	Victoria	1,000,000	(Australia) Nick Cullen (2)	21		
30 Nov	Emirates Australian Open	New South Wales	1,250,000	(United States) Jordan Spieth (n/a)	34	ONE	Flagship event
7 Dec	Nanshan NSW PGA Championship	New South Wales	120,000	(Australia) Lincoln Tighe (1)	6		
14 Dec	Australian PGA Championship	Queensland	1,000,000	(Australia) Greg Chalmers (5)	24	ONE	

== Order of Merit ==
The Order of Merit was based on prize money won during the season, calculated in Australian dollars.

Position	Player	Prize money (A$)
1	(Australia) Greg Chalmers	254,525
2	(Australia) Steven Jeffress	213,652
3	(Australia) Nick Cullen	208,256
4	(Australia) Adam Scott	207,250
5	(New Zealand) Ryan Fox	183,785
