= 2020–21 PGA Tour of Australasia =

Golf tour season

2020–21 PGA Tour of Australasia season
- Duration: 6 February 2020 – 28 March 2021
- Number of official events: 11 (Note: A further four tournaments were scheduled but were cancelled.)
- Most wins: (Australia) Brad Kennedy (2) (Australia) Bryden Macpherson (2)
- Order of Merit: (Australia) Brad Kennedy
- Player of the Year: (Australia) Brad Kennedy

The 2020–21 PGA Tour of Australasia, titled as the 2020–21 ISPS Handa PGA Tour of Australasia for sponsorship reasons, was the 47th season on the PGA Tour of Australasia, the main professional golf tour in Australia and New Zealand since it was formed in 1973.

== In-season changes ==
The season was impacted by the COVID-19 pandemic with several tournaments being postponed or cancelled. In response, the tour announced that the season would be extended through to March 2021, with subsequent seasons being seasonal rather than calendar based.

== Schedule ==
The following table lists official events during the 2020–21 season.

Date	Tournament	Location	Purse (A$)	Winner (Note: The number in brackets after each winner's name is the number of PGA Tour of Australasia events they had won up to and including that tournament. This information is only shown for PGA Tour of Australasia members.)	OWGR points	Other tours (Note: ALPG − ALPG Tour; ASA − Asian Tour; EUR − European Tour.)	Notes
9 Feb	ISPS Handa Vic Open	Victoria	1,500,000	(Australia) Min Woo Lee (1)	20	EUR	
16 Feb	Coca-Cola Queensland PGA Championship	Queensland	150,000	(Australia) Michael Sim (2)	7		
23 Feb	Isuzu Queensland Open	Queensland	137,500	(Australia) Anthony Quayle (1)	7		
1 Mar	New Zealand Open	New Zealand	NZ$1,400,000	(Australia) Brad Kennedy (5)	15	ASA	
~~27 Sep~~; ~~3 May~~	SP Export PNG Golf Open	Papua New Guinea	–	Cancelled	–		
~~22 Nov~~	Victorian PGA Championship	Victoria	–	Cancelled	–		
24 Jan; ~~15 Nov~~	Gippsland Super 6	Victoria	125,000	(Australia) Marcus Fraser (1)	6		
31 Jan	TPS Victoria	Victoria	150,000	(Australia) Brad Kennedy (6)	7	ALPG	New tournament series Mixed event
7 Feb	Victorian PGA Championship	Victoria	137,500	(Australia) Christopher Wood (1)	7		
11 Feb	Moonah Links PGA Classic	Victoria	150,000	(Australia) Bryden Macpherson (1)	7		New tournament
~~21 Feb~~; ~~6 Dec~~	Australian PGA Championship	Queensland	–	Cancelled	–	EUR	
7 Mar	TPS Sydney	New South Wales	150,000	(Australia) Andrew Martin (1)	6	ALPG	Mixed event
14 Mar	Isuzu Queensland Open	Queensland	125,000	(Australia) Andrew Evans (1)	6		
28 Mar	Golf Challenge NSW Open	New South Wales	400,000	(Australia) Bryden Macpherson (2)	7		
–	Emirates Australian Open	Victoria	–	Cancelled	–		Flagship event

=== Unofficial events ===
The following events were sanctioned by the PGA Tour of Australasia, but did not carry official money, nor were wins official.

Date	Tournament	Location	Purse (A$)	Winner	OWGR points	Other tours	Notes
10 Oct	TX Civil & Logistics WA PGA Championship	Western Australia	80,000	(Australia) Jarryd Felton	4		
18 Oct	Nexus Risk WA Open	Western Australia	60,000	(Australia) Hayden Hopewell (a)	4		
25 Oct; ~~23 Aug~~	Tailor-made Building Services NT PGA Championship	Northern Territory	70,000	(Australia) Aaron Pike	4		

== Order of Merit ==
The Order of Merit was based on prize money won during the season, calculated in Australian dollars. The leading player on the Order of Merit earned status to play on the 2022 European Tour (DP World Tour).

Position	Player	Prize money (A$)	Status earned
1	(Australia) Brad Kennedy	302,480	Promoted to European Tour
2	(Australia) Min Woo Lee	253,327	Already exempt (Note: Lee and Herbert were already exempt due to being tournament winners on the 2021 European Tour.)
3	(New Zealand) Ryan Fox	168,882	Already exempt (Note: Fox was already exempt due to finishing inside the Top 121 of the 2021 Race to Dubai.)
4	(Australia) Lucas Herbert	162,841	Already exempt
5	(Australia) Nick Flanagan	116,710	

== Awards ==
Award	Winner	Ref.
Player of the Year	(Australia) Brad Kennedy	
