= Kieran Pratt =

Australian professional golfer

Personal information
- Nationality: Australia
- Born: 14 May 1988 (age 38) Melbourne, Australia

Career
- Sport: Golf
- Turned professional: 2010
- Current tours: Asian Tour; PGA Tour of Australasia
- Professional wins: 1

Number of wins by tour
- Asian Tour: 1

Kieran Pratt (born 15 May 1988) is an Australian professional golfer.

== Career ==
Pratt was born in Melbourne. He won several amateur events in Australia before turning professional in 2010.

Pratt joined the Asian Tour in 2011 and won his first title at the start of the 2012 season, the Zaykabar Myanmar Open. He also plays on the PGA Tour of Australasia.

== Amateur wins ==
- 2009 Dunes Medal, Port Phillip Amateur, Victorian Amateur Championship
- 2010 Lake Macquarie Amateur

== Professional wins (1) ==
=== Asian Tour wins (1) ===
No.	Date	Tournament	Winning score	Margin of victory	Runners-up
1	2 Feb 2012	Zaykabar Myanmar Open	−15 (70-69-66-68=273)	Playoff	(Thailand) Kiradech Aphibarnrat, (Australia) Adam Blyth

Asian Tour playoff record (1–0)

No.	Year	Tournament	Opponents	Result
1	2012	Zaykabar Myanmar Open	(Thailand) Kiradech Aphibarnrat, (Australia) Adam Blyth	Won with birdie on second extra hole Aphibarnrat eliminated by birdie on first hole

== Team appearances ==
Amateur

- Eisenhower Trophy (representing Australia): 2010
- Sloan Morpeth Trophy (representing Australia): 2010 (winners)
- Australian Men's Interstate Teams Matches (representing Victoria): 2009 (winners), 2010
