= PalmettoPride Classic =

Golf tournament

Tournament information
- Location: Charleston, South Carolina
- Established: 2006
- Course: Daniel Island Club
- Par: 72
- Length: 7,446 yards (6,809 m)
- Tour: Nationwide Tour
- Format: Stroke play
- Prize fund: $500,000
- Month played: October
- Final year: 2006

Tournament record score
- Aggregate: 276 Ken Duke (2006); 276 Michael Sim (2006)
- To par: −12 as above

Final champion
- (Australia) Michael Sim
- Location in the United States Location in South Carolina

The PalmettoPride Classic was a golf tournament on the Nationwide Tour. It was only played in 2006. It was played at the Daniel Island Club in Charleston, South Carolina, United States.

The purse was $500,000, with $90,000 going to the winner.

== Winners ==
Year	Winner	Score	To par	Margin of victory	Runner-up
2006	(Australia) Michael Sim	276	−12	Playoff	(United States) Ken Duke
