= PGA Tour China seasons =

This page lists all PGA Tour China seasons from its inaugural season in 2014.

Since its inception, most tournaments on PGA Tour China have been played in China.

== 2014 season ==
=== Schedule ===
The following table lists official events during the 2014 season.

Date	Tournament	Location	Purse (CN¥)	Winner (Note: The number in brackets after each winner's name is the number of PGA Tour China events they had won up to and including that tournament. This information is only shown for PGA Tour China members. It is rare for someone to accumulate many wins on PGA Tour China as success at this level usually leads to promotion to the Web.com Tour.)	OWGR points
20 Apr	Mission Hills Haikou Open	Hainan	1,200,000	(South Korea) Wang Jeung-hun (1)	6
4 May	Buick Open	Guangdong	1,200,000	(United States) Sam Chien (1)	6
18 May	United Investment Real Estate Wuhan Open	Hubei	1,200,000	(Australia) Brett Drewitt (1)	6
8 Jun	Lanhai Open	Shanghai	1,200,000	(Australia) David McKenzie (1)	6
15 Jun	Earls Beijing Open	Beijing	1,200,000	(China) Zhang Xinjun (1)	6
10 Aug	Yulongwan Yunnan Open	Yunnan	1,200,000	(Thailand) Gunn Charoenkul (1)	6
7 Sep	Chateau Junding Penglai Open	Shandong	1,200,000	(South Korea) Todd Baek (1)	6
14 Sep	Cadillac Championship	Beijing	1,200,000	(Australia) David McKenzie (2)	6
28 Sep	Jianye Tianzhu Henan Open	Henan	1,200,000	(China) Li Haotong (1)	6
16 Nov	Nine Dragons Open	Zhejiang	1,200,000	(China) Jin Cheng (a) (1)	6
23 Nov	Hainan Open	Hainan	1,200,000	(China) Li Haotong (2)	6
30 Nov	CTS Tycoon Championship	Guangdong	1,200,000	(China) Li Haotong (3)	6

=== Order of Merit ===
The Order of Merit was based on prize money won during the season, calculated in Renminbi. The top five players on the tour earned status to play on the 2015 Web.com Tour.

Position	Player	Prize money (CN¥)
1	(China) Li Haotong	967,788
2	(China) Zhang Xinjun	650,600
3	(Australia) Brett Drewitt	585,196
4	(United States) Sam Chien	573,951
5	(South Korea) Todd Baek	535,920

== 2015 season ==
=== Schedule ===
The following table lists official events during the 2015 season.

Date	Tournament	Location	Purse (CN¥)	Winner	OWGR points
5 Apr	Buick Open	Hainan	1,200,000	(New Zealand) Josh Geary (1)	6
17 May	Eternal Courtyard Open	Henan	1,200,000	(Taiwan) Chan Shih-chang (1)	6
24 May	United Investment Real Estate Wuhan Open	Hubei	1,200,000	(Canada) Shin Yong-gu (1)	6
31 May	Lanhai Open	Shanghai	1,200,000	(New Zealand) Josh Geary (2)	6
13 Sep	Pingan Bank Open	Beijing	1,200,000	(Canada) Eugene Wong (1)	6
27 Sep	Cadillac Championship	Beijing	1,200,000	(Australia) Bryden Macpherson (1)	6
4 Oct	Yulongwan Yunnan Open	Yunnan	1,200,000	(New Zealand) Josh Geary (3)	6
11 Oct	Lushan Open	Jiangxi	1,200,000	(Australia) Bryden Macpherson (2)	6
18 Oct	Chongqing Jiangnan NewTown KingRun Open	Chongqing	1,200,000	(China) Zhang Xinjun (2)	6
22 Nov	Nine Dragons Open	Zhejiang	1,200,000	(China) Chao Haimeng (1)	6
29 Nov	Hainan Open	Hainan	1,200,000	(China) Zhang Huilin (1)	6
6 Dec	Capital Airline – HNA Real Estate Championship	Guangdong	1,200,000	(China) He Zeyu (1)	7

=== Order of Merit ===
The Order of Merit was based on prize money won during the season, calculated in Renminbi. The top five players on the tour earned status to play on the 2016 Web.com Tour.

Position	Player	Prize money (CN¥)
1	(Australia) Bryden Macpherson	769,960
2	(New Zealand) Josh Geary	747,230
3	(China) Zhang Xinjun	545,046
4	(China) Dou Zecheng	483,813
5	(Canada) Eugene Wong	454,768

== 2016 season ==
=== Schedule ===
The following table lists official events during the 2016 season.

Date	Tournament	Location	Purse (CN¥)	Winner	OWGR points
15 May	St. Andrews Henan Open	Henan	1,200,000	(China) Dou Zecheng (1)	6
29 May	United Investment Real Estate Wuhan Open	Hubei	1,200,000	(China) Dou Zecheng (2)	6
5 Jun	Cadillac Championship	Sichuan	1,200,000	(United States) Alexander Kang (1)	6
12 Jun	Lanhai Open	Shanghai	1,200,000	(Australia) Rohan Blizard (1)	6
26 Jun	Sunning Estate Nanjing Zhongshan Open	Jiangsu	1,200,000	(China) Dou Zecheng (3)	6
3 Jul	Ping An Private Bank Wanda Open	Jilin	1,200,000	(South Korea) Kim Tae-woo (1)	6
4 Sep	Yulongwan Yunnan Open	Yunnan	1,200,000	(China) Dou Zecheng (4)	6
11 Sep	Chongqing Jiangnan NewTown KingRun Open	Chongqing	1,200,000	(Thailand) Gunn Charoenkul (2)	7
18 Sep	Pingan Bank Open	Beijing	1,200,000	(United States) Charlie Saxon (1)	7
6 Nov	Clearwater Bay Open	Hong Kong	1,200,000	(Australia) Daniel Nisbet (1)	7
13 Nov	Putian Open	Fujian	1,200,000	(South Korea) Kim Tae-woo (2)	7
20 Nov	Zhuhai Hengqin Phoenix Tree Open	Guangdong	1,200,000	(United States) Charlie Saxon (2)	7
27 Nov	Buick Open	Guangdong	1,200,000	(China) Zhang Huilin (2)	7

=== Order of Merit ===
The Order of Merit was based on prize money won during the season, calculated in Renminbi. The top five players on the tour earned status to play on the 2017 Web.com Tour.

Position	Player	Prize money (CN¥)
1	(China) Dou Zecheng	1,144,350
2	(United States) Charlie Saxon	871,395
3	(United States) Alexander Kang	597,575
4	(South Korea) Kim Tae-woo	578,886
5	(China) Zhang Xinjun	504,675

== 2018 season ==
=== Schedule ===
The following table lists official events during the 2018 season.

Date	Tournament	Location	Purse (CN¥)	Winner	OWGR points
18 Mar	Chengdu Championship	Sichuan	1,500,000	(United States) Jeffrey Kang (1)	6
25 Mar	Chongqing Championship	Chongqing	1,500,000	(China) Cao Yi (1)	6
6 May	Changsha Championship	Hunan	1,500,000	(United States) Charlie Saxon (3)	6
13 May	Haikou Championship	Hainan	1,500,000	(South Korea) Todd Baek (2)	6
10 Jun	Guilin Championship	Guangxi	1,500,000	(United States) Charlie Saxon (4)	6
17 Jun	Kunming Championship	Yunnan	1,500,000	(Hong Kong) Yeung Motin (1)	6
15 Jul	Yantai Championship	Shandong	1,500,000	(United States) Joseph Winslow (1)	6
22 Jul	Qingdao Championship	Shandong	1,500,000	(China) Yuan Yechun (1)	6
29 Jul	Beijing Championship	Beijing	1,500,000	(Canada) Peter Campbell (1)	6
2 Sep	Suzhou Open	Jiangsu	1,500,000	(Canada) Richard Jung (1)	6
9 Sep	Qinhuangdao Championship	Hebei	1,500,000	(New Zealand) Nick Voke (1)	6
30 Sep	Macau Championship	Macau	1,500,000	(New Zealand) Nick Voke (2)	6
7 Oct	Zhuhai Championship	Guangdong	1,500,000	(United States) Kevin Techakanokboon (1)	6
14 Oct	Clearwater Bay Open	Hong Kong	2,000,000	(New Zealand) Nick Voke (3)	6

=== Order of Merit ===
The Order of Merit was based on prize money won during the season, calculated in Renminbi. The top five players on the tour earned status to play on the 2019 Korn Ferry Tour.

Position	Player	Prize money (CN¥)
1	(England) Callum Tarren	1,094,600
2	(United States) Charlie Saxon	1,092,224
3	(New Zealand) Nick Voke	987,500
4	(Japan) Yuwa Kosaihira	732,832
5	(South Korea) Todd Baek	660,700

== 2019 season ==
=== Schedule ===
The following table lists official events during the 2019 season.

Date	Tournament	Location	Purse (CN¥)	Winner (Note: The number in brackets after each winner's name is the number of PGA Tour China events they had won up to and including that tournament. It is rare for someone to accumulate many wins on PGA Tour China as success at this level usually leads to promotion to the Korn Ferry Tour.)	OWGR points
31 Mar	Chongqing Championship	Chongqing	1,500,000	(Japan) Taihei Sato (1)	6
7 Apr	Sanya Championship	Hainan	1,500,000	(United States) Trevor Sluman (1)	6
14 Apr	Haikou Championship	Hainan	1,500,000	(United States) David Kocher (1)	6
12 May	Beijing Championship	Beijing	1,500,000	(Canada) Richard Jung (2)	6
19 May	Qinhuangdao Championship	Hebei	1,500,000	(South Korea) Luke Kwon (1)	6
26 May	Nantong Championship	Jiangsu	1,500,000	(United States) Kevin Techakanokboon (2)	6
16 Jun	Suzhou Open	Jiangsu	1,500,000	(France) Cyril Bouniol (1)	6
23 Jun	Huangshan Championship	Anhui	1,500,000	(China) Bai Zhengkai (1)	6
21 Jul	Guangzhou Open	Guangdong	1,500,000	(United States) Max McGreevy (1)	6
28 Jul	Dongguan Open	Guangdong	1,500,000	(United States) Joey Lane (1)	6
15 Sep	Haikou Classic	Hainan	1,500,000	(Singapore) Quincy Quek (1)	6
22 Sep	Zhuzhou Classic	Hunan	1,500,000	(Hong Kong) Yeung Motin (2)	6
13 Oct	Macau Championship	Macau	1,500,000	(Canada) Shin Yong-gu (2)	6
~~20 Oct~~	Clearwater Bay Open	Hong Kong	–	Cancelled (Note: Cancelled due to the 2019–20 Hong Kong protests.)	–

=== Order of Merit ===
The Order of Merit was based on prize money won during the season, calculated in Renminbi. The top five players on the tour earned status to play on the 2020–21 Korn Ferry Tour.

Position	Player	Prize money (CN¥)
1	(United States) Max McGreevy	974,153
2	(United States) Trevor Sluman	787,865
3	(United States) David Kocher	771,337
4	(France) Cyril Bouniol	674,968
5	(South Korea) Luke Kwon	668,359

== 2020 season ==
The 2020 season was announced in January with a 14 tournament schedule which ventured outside Greater China for the first time with the Phuket Championship in Thailand. Due to the COVID-19 pandemic, the season was initially postponed, before being cancelled in late July, with all exemptions being carried forward to 2021. Earlier in July, China had announced the cancellation all international sporting events for the year. All players who qualified for PGA Tour China during the 2020 season were eligible for the LocaliQ Series.

=== Schedule ===
The following table lists intended official events during the 2020 season.

Date	Tournament	Location
29 Mar	Sanya Championship	Hainan
5 Apr	Haikou Classic	Hainan
12 Apr	Chongqing Championship	Chongqing
19 Apr	Guangzhou Open	Guangdong
10 May	Clearwater Bay Open	Hong Kong
17 May	Phuket Championship	Thailand
24 May	Beijing Championship	Beijing
13 Sep	Suzhou Championship	Jiangsu
20 Sep	Shanghai Open	Shanghai
27 Sep	Macau Championship	Macau
