= Michael Sim =

Australian professional golfer (born 1984)

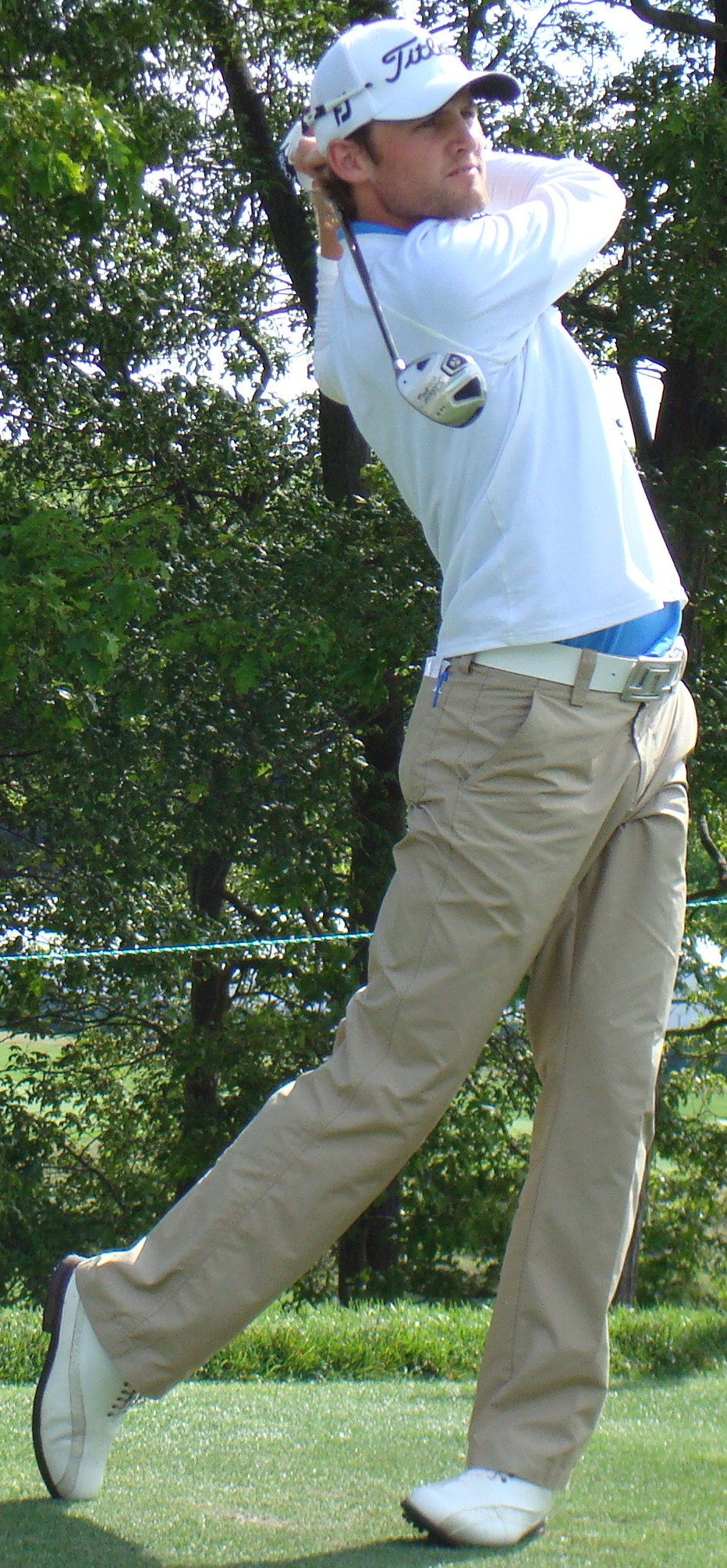

Personal information
- Nationality: Australia
- Born: 23 October 1984 (age 42) Aberdeen, Scotland
- Height: 6 ft 0 in (1.83 m)
- Weight: 150 lb (68 kg; 11 st)

Career
- Sport: Golf
- Turned professional: 2005
- Current tour: PGA Tour of Australasia
- Former tours: PGA Tour; Web.com Tour
- Professional wins: 7
- Highest ranking: 34 (31 January 2010)

Number of wins by tour
- PGA Tour of Australasia: 2
- Korn Ferry Tour: 4
- Other: 1

Best results in major championships
- Masters Tournament: DNP
- PGA Championship: T51: 2009
- U.S. Open: T18: 2009
- The Open Championship: CUT: 2010

Achievements and awards
- Nationwide Tour money list winner: 2009
- Nationwide Tour Player of the Year: 2009
- PGA Tour of Australasia Order of Merit winner: 2009

Michael Sim (born 23 October 1984) is an Australian professional golfer.

== Early life ==
Sim was born in Aberdeen, Scotland. He moved to Australia when he was five years old. Sim was an Australian Institute of Sport scholarship holder in 2002.

== Amateur career ==
In 2005, Sim was the top ranked amateur in the world having won four titles during the year including the Sunnehanna Amateur and the Monroe Invitational.

== Professional career ==
In 2005, Sim turned professional at the end of the year. He played on the Nationwide Tour in 2006, and qualified for the PGA Tour by virtue of a 19th-place finish on the end of season money list, aided by a win at PalmettoPride Classic. After a late start to the 2007 season, caused by a stress fracture of the spine, he finished 169th on the PGA Tour money list. He was granted a medical extension for 2008, but failed to win enough money in five events to retain his place on the PGA Tour, and he returned to the second tier Nationwide Tour. In April 2009, Sim's bid to return to the elite tour got off to a good start when he secured his second career victory at the Stonebrae Classic, finishing six strokes clear of the field. The following week he finished in second after losing in a playoff to Patrick Sheehan, and then in May he won the BMW Charity Pro-Am in a playoff over Fabián Gómez.

Sim played with Tiger Woods during the final round of the 2009 U. S. Open and finished in at tie for 18th. He was invited a month later by the PGA to play in the 2009 PGA Championship at Hazeltine National Golf Club where he finished T51.

Sim won the Christmas in October Classic to earn an automatic "battlefield promotion" to the PGA Tour. The victory was his third Nationwide Tour win of 2009 and his fourth overall. With the win he also set the Nationwide Tour single season money title, earning well over half a million dollars. He was one of the top 50 players in the Official World Golf Rankings in 2009, which earned him entry into the 2010 Masters Tournament; he later withdrew from the tournament due to injury. He also won the PGA Tour of Australasia Order of Merit in 2009.

Sim performed moderately on the PGA Tour in 2010, with the highlight of his season being a T-2 at the Farmers Insurance Open. He comfortably retained his card by finishing 65th on the money list. In 2011 Sim could not follow up his PGA Tour rookie season and went back to the Web.com Tour in 2012. A string of injuries limited Sim after the 2011 season and he played sparingly on the PGA Tour of Australasia, Korean Tour, OneAsia Tour, and Web.com Tour.

== Amateur wins ==
- 2002 Western Australia Amateur Championship, Victorian Junior Masters
- 2004 Riversdale Cup, Southern Amateur
- 2005 New Zealand Amateur Stroke-Play Championship, Western Australia Amateur Matchplay Championship, Sunnehanna Amateur, Monroe Invitational

== Professional wins (7) ==
=== PGA Tour of Australasia wins (2) ===
No.	Date	Tournament	Winning score	Margin of victory	Runner(s)-up
1	29 Oct 2017	Isuzu Queensland Open	−9 (69-66-71-69=275)	1 stroke	(Australia) Oliver Goss, (New Zealand) Kieran Muir
2	16 Feb 2020	Coca-Cola Queensland PGA Championship	−12 (68-67-63-70=268)	Playoff	(Australia) Scott Arnold

PGA Tour of Australasia playoff record (1–1)

No.	Year	Tournament	Opponent	Result
1	2006	Jacob's Creek Open Championship	(Australia) Paul Sheehan	Lost to bogey on second extra hole
2	2020	Coca-Cola Queensland PGA Championship	(Australia) Scott Arnold	Won with par on fourth extra hole

=== Nationwide Tour wins (4) ===
No.	Date	Tournament	Winning score	Margin of victory	Runner(s)-up
1	22 Oct 2006	PalmettoPride Classic	−12 (67-69-69-71=276)	Playoff	(United States) Ken Duke
2	5 Apr 2009	Stonebrae Classic	−18 (71-64-67-64=266)	6 strokes	(United States) John Kimbell, (Australia) Cameron Percy
3	17 May 2009	BMW Charity Pro-Am	−22 (68-65-62-69=264)	Playoff	(Argentina) Fabián Gómez
4	23 Aug 2009	Christmas in October Classic	−20 (65-67-65-67=264)	2 strokes	(United States) Josh Teater

Nationwide Tour playoff record (2–2)

No.	Year	Tournament	Opponent	Result
1	2006	Jacob's Creek Open Championship	(Australia) Paul Sheehan	Lost to bogey on second extra hole
2	2006	PalmettoPride Classic	(United States) Ken Duke	Won with birdie on first extra hole
3	2009	Athens Regional Foundation Classic	(United States) Patrick Sheehan	Lost to birdie on first extra hole
4	2009	BMW Charity Pro-Am	(Argentina) Fabián Gómez	Won with par on first extra hole

=== Other wins (1) ===
No.	Date	Tournament	Winning score	Margin of victory	Runner-up
1	20 Oct 2019	Nexus Risk WA Open	−15 (68-70-67-68=273)	1 stroke	(Australia) Hayden Hopewell (a)

Other playoff record (0–1)

No.	Year	Tournament	Opponent	Result
1	2020	Tailor-made Building Services NT PGA Championship	(Australia) Aaron Pike	Lost to par on first extra hole

== Results in major championships ==
Tournament	2009	2010
U.S. Open	T18	CUT
The Open Championship		CUT
PGA Championship	T51	CUT

Note: Sim never played in the Masters Tournament.

Did not play

CUT = missed the half-way cut
"T" = tied

== Results in The Players Championship ==
Tournament	2011
The Players Championship	CUT

CUT = missed the halfway cut

== Results in World Golf Championships ==
Tournament	2010
Match Play	R64
Championship	68
Invitational	
Champions	T58

Did not play

QF, R16, R32, R64 = Round in which player lost in match play
"T" = Tied

== Team appearances ==
Amateur

- Nomura Cup (representing Australia): 2003 (winners), 2005 (winners)
- Eisenhower Trophy (representing Australia): 2004

== See also ==
- 2006 Nationwide Tour graduates
- 2009 Nationwide Tour graduates
- List of golfers with most Web.com Tour wins
