= Cho Byung-min =

South Korean golfer

Personal information
- Nationality: South Korea
- Born: 4 September 1989 (age 37)
- Height: 1.78 m (5 ft 10 in)
- Weight: 80 kg (180 lb; 13 st)

Career
- Sport: Golf
- Status: Professional
- Current tours: Japan Golf Tour; Korean Tour
- Former tour: PGA Tour China
- Professional wins: 1

Number of wins by tour
- Japan Golf Tour: 1

Cho Byung-min (Korean: 조병민; born 4 September 1989) is a South Korean professional golfer.

Cho played on the Korean Tour in 2014 and 2016 and PGA Tour China in 2015. He earned a 2016 Japan Golf Tour card through qualifying school and won the Kansai Open Golf Championship in his first start on that tour. It was Cho's first professional win.

== Professional wins (1) ==
=== Japan Golf Tour wins (1) ===
No.	Date	Tournament	Winning score	Margin of victory	Runners-up
1	22 May 2016	Kansai Open Golf Championship	−6 (69-70-69-70=278)	1 stroke	(Japan) Tomohiro Kondo, (Australia) Scott Strange
