= 2006 Nationwide Tour graduates =

This is a list of players who graduated from the Nationwide Tour in 2006. The top 22 players on the Nationwide Tour's money list in 2006 earned their PGA Tour card for 2007.

	2006 Nationwide Tour		2007 PGA Tour				
Player	Money list rank	Earnings ($)	Starts	Cuts made	Best finish	Money list rank	Earnings ($)
(United States) Ken Duke	1	382,443	31	24	2	37	1,927,102
(United States) Johnson Wagner*	2	372,069	33	15	2	98	1,013,024
(United States) Cliff Kresge	3	339,763	30	23	T6	113	901,549
(United States) Craig Bowden	4	334,671	25	13	T9	172	333,970
(United States) Tripp Isenhour	5	321,996	32	14	T5	152	471,980
(United States) Jeff Quinney*	6	317,802	29	18	3	57	1,612,056
(United States) Boo Weekley	7	312,843	29	20	Win	23	2,613,211
(United States) Jason Dufner	8	310,666	32	18	T6	140	574,992
(United States) Brandt Snedeker*	9	300,918	29	23	Win	17	2,836,643
(United States) Matt Kuchar	10	300,867	26	16	T3	115	886,146
(United States) Craig Kanada	11	297,744	34	20	T10	128	743,305
(United States) Kevin Stadler	12	294,657	31	16	T2	124	810,876
(Australia) Andrew Buckle*	13	277,976	26	12	T4	146	513,630
(Canada) Jim Rutledge*	14	257,979	23	5	T31	226	62,242
(United States) Doug LaBelle II*	15	240,174	33	18	T4	138	604,633
(Australia) Gavin Coles	16	239,141	28	16	T9	147	511,353
(United States) Michael Putnam*	17	230,049	29	19	T16	158	422,359
(Australia) Jarrod Lyle*	18	227,909	24	14	T12 (twice)	164	390,303
(Australia) Michael Sim*	19	220,432	17	9	T9	162	399,900
(Australia) Paul Sheehan*	20	216,407	11	1	T64	253	10,143
(United States) John Merrick*	21	208,506	29	16	T4	135	649,438
(United States) Bryce Molder^{†}	22	205,413	21	7	T6	185	257,593

*PGA Tour rookie for 2007.
^{†}First-time PGA Tour member, but not a rookie due to having accepted Special Temporary Membership and played 22 tournaments during the 2002 PGA Tour season
T = Tied
Green background indicates the player retained his PGA Tour card for 2008 (won or finished inside the top 125).
Yellow background indicates the player did not retain his PGA Tour card for 2008, but retained conditional status (finished between 126–150).
Red background indicates the player did not retain his PGA Tour card for 2008 (finished outside the top 150).

== Winners on the PGA Tour in 2007 ==
No.	Date	Player	Tournament	Winning score	Margin of victory	Runner(s)-up
1	Apr 16	(United States) Boo Weekley	Verizon Heritage	−14 (67-69-66-68=270)	1 stroke	(South Africa) Ernie Els
2	Aug 19	(United States) Brandt Snedeker	Wyndham Championship	−22 (70-67-66-63=266)	2 strokes	(United States) Billy Mayfair, (United States) Jeff Overton, (United States) Tim Petrovic

== Runners-up on the PGA Tour in 2007 ==
No.	Date	Player	Tournament	Winner	Winning score	Runner-up score
1	Mar 5	(United States) Boo Weekley; Lost in four-man playoff	Honda Classic	(United States) Mark Wilson	−5 (72-66-66-71=275)	−5 (71-68-66-70=275)
2	Apr 22	(United States) Ken Duke	Zurich Classic of New Orleans	(United States) Nick Watney	−15 (69-67-68-69=273)	−12 (69-71-66-70=276)
3	Aug 5	(United States) Kevin Stadler	Reno-Tahoe Open	(United States) Steve Flesch	−15 (63-69-69-72=273)	−10 (74-67-67-70=278)
4	Sep 30	(United States) Johnson Wagner	Viking Classic	(United States) Chad Campbell	−13 (70-72-64-69=275)	−12 (73-65-68-70=276)

== See also ==
- 2006 PGA Tour Qualifying School graduates
