= Jin Jeong =

South Korean golfer (born 1990)

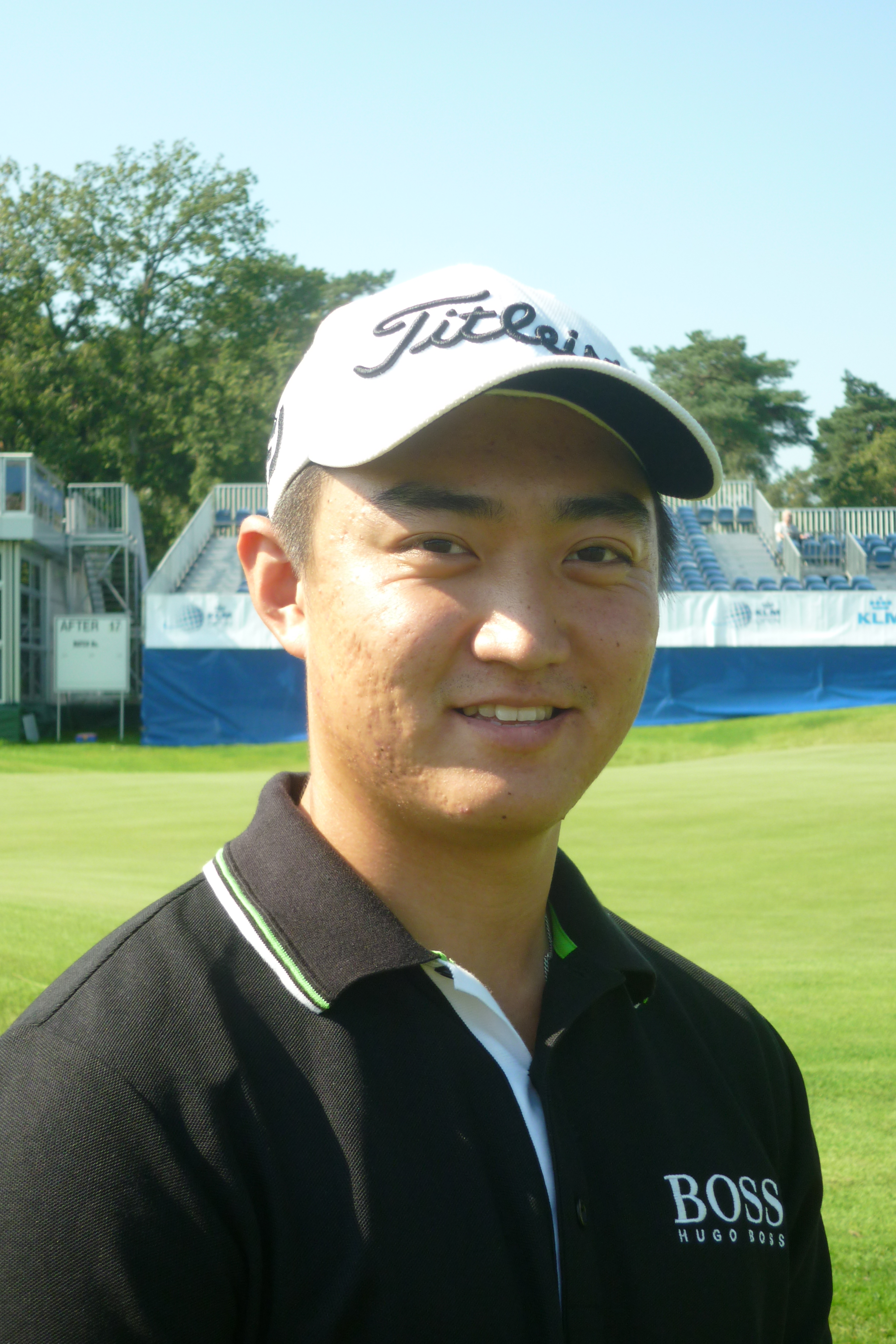

Personal information
- Full name: Jeong Yeon-jin
- Nationality: South Korea
- Born: 2 February 1990 (age 36) Busan, South Korea

Career
- Sport: Golf
- Turned professional: 2011
- Current tour: PGA Tour of Australasia
- Former tour: European Tour
- Professional wins: 2

Number of wins by tour
- European Tour: 1
- PGA Tour of Australasia: 1
- Other: 1

Best results in major championships
- Masters Tournament: CUT: 2011
- PGA Championship: DNP
- U.S. Open: DNP
- The Open Championship: T14: 2010

Jeong Yeon-jin (Korean: 정연진; born 2 February 1990), better known as Jin Jeong, is a South Korean professional golfer.

== Early life and amateur career ==
Jeong was born in Busan, South Korea. He moved to Melbourne, Australia in 2006. Jeong has enjoyed a highly successful amateur career. In 2010, he had two spells as the number one ranked amateur golfer on the back of four wins including The Amateur Championship, the first Asian to win that championship, and finishing as low amateur in a tie for 14th place in The Open Championship.

== Professional career ==
In April 2011, Jeong turned professional. In December 2011, he finished 16th in the PGA Tour of Australasia qualifying school, winning a place on tour for 2012.

In 2012, Jeong played in all three stages of the European Tour qualifying school, obtaining a place in some Challenge Tour events for 2013. In early October 2013, he competed in the first stage of the qualifying schools for the European Tour (successfully) and the Web.com Tour (unsuccessfully).

Jeong won his first championship as a professional on 20 October 2013, winning the ISPS Handa Perth International on the European Tour in a playoff over Ross Fisher. He was one of three players who had earned a place in that tournament from his position in the PGA Tour of Australasia's Tier 2 Money List for 2012, finishing 55th in the 2012 Order of Merit. This win gave him an exemption on the European Tour until the end of 2015.

== Amateur wins ==
- 2008 Port Phillip Amateur, Victorian Junior Masters
- 2010 The Amateur Championship, Riversdale Cup, Boroondara Cup

== Professional wins (2) ==
=== European Tour wins (1) ===
No.	Date	Tournament	Winning score	Margin of victory	Runner-up
1	20 Oct 2013	ISPS Handa Perth International^{1}	−10 (68-72-69-69=278)	Playoff	(England) Ross Fisher

^{1}Co-sanctioned by the PGA Tour of Australasia

European Tour playoff record (1–0)

No.	Year	Tournament	Opponent	Result
1	2013	ISPS Handa Perth International	(England) Ross Fisher	Won with par on first extra hole

=== PGA Tour of Australasia wins (1) ===
No.	Date	Tournament	Winning score	Margin of victory	Runner-up
1	20 Oct 2013	ISPS Handa Perth International^{1}	−10 (68-72-69-69=278)	Playoff	(England) Ross Fisher

^{1}Co-sanctioned by the European Tour

PGA Tour of Australasia playoff record (1–0)

No.	Year	Tournament	Opponent	Result
1	2013	ISPS Handa Perth International	(England) Ross Fisher	Won with par on first extra hole

=== Other wins (1) ===
- 2010 Tasmanian Open (as an amateur)

== Results in major championships ==
Tournament	2010	2011	2012	2013	2014
Masters Tournament		CUT			
U.S. Open					
The Open Championship	T14_{LA}				CUT
PGA Championship					

Did not play

LA = Low amateur
CUT = missed the half-way cut
"T" = tied

== Results in World Golf Championships ==
Tournament	2013	2014
Match Play		
Championship		T60
Invitational	T64	
Champions	T18	76

Did not play

"T" = Tied
