= 2004 Asian Tour =

Golf tour season

2004 Asian Tour season
- Duration: 18 December 2003 – 12 December 2004
- Number of official events: 22
- Most wins: (Thailand) Thongchai Jaidee (2) (Note: Miguel Ángel Jiménez won three events, but was not an Asian Tour member.) (Australia) Terry Pilkadaris (2)
- Order of Merit: (Thailand) Thongchai Jaidee
- Players' Player of the Year: (Thailand) Thongchai Jaidee
- Rookie of the Year: (Australia) Adam Groom

The 2004 Asian Tour was the 10th season of the modern Asian Tour (formerly the Asian PGA Tour), the main professional golf tour in Asia (outside of Japan) since it was established in 1995.

== Changes for 2004 ==
The season marked the first year in which the Asian Tour had separated from the Asian PGA. The tour was now to be run by an organisation established by the players.

== Schedule ==
The following table lists official events during the 2004 season.

Date	Tournament	Host country	Purse (US$)	Winner (Note: The number in brackets after each winner's name is the number of Asian Tour events they had won up to and including that tournament. This information is only shown for Asian Tour members.)	OWGR points	Other tours (Note: ANZ − PGA Tour of Australasia; EUR − European Tour; JPN − Japan Golf Tour; KOR − Korean Tour.)	Notes
21 Dec	Asia Japan Okinawa Open	Japan	¥100,000,000	(Japan) Hideto Tanihara (n/a)	12	JPN	
25 Jan	Thailand Open	Thailand	300,000	(Thailand) Boonchu Ruangkit (5)	6		
1 Feb	Johnnie Walker Classic	Thailand	£1,000,000	(Spain) Miguel Ángel Jiménez (n/a)	38	ANZ, EUR	
15 Feb	London Myanmar Open	Myanmar	200,000	(Thailand) Thongchai Jaidee (5)	6		
22 Feb	Carlsberg Malaysian Open	Malaysia	1,210,000	(Thailand) Thongchai Jaidee (6)	16	EUR	
29 Feb	DHL Philippine Open	Philippine	175,000	(United States) Edward Michaels (1)	6		
21 Mar	Caltex Masters	Singapore	900,000	(Scotland) Colin Montgomerie (n/a)	16	EUR	
28 Mar	Royal Challenge Indian Open	India	300,000	(Singapore) Mardan Mamat (1)	6		
2 May	Volkswagen Masters-China	China	300,000	(India) Rahil Gangjee (1)	6		New tournament
9 May	Macau Open	Macau	275,000	(United States) Jason Knutzon (1)	10		
16 May	BMW Asian Open	China	1,500,000	(Spain) Miguel Ángel Jiménez (n/a)	18	EUR	
23 May	SK Telecom Open	South Korea	₩500,000,000	(Scotland) Simon Yates (2)	10	KOR	
22 Aug	Tianjin TEDA Open	China	200,000	(Thailand) Thammanoon Sriroj (5)	6		
12 Sep	Kolon Korea Open	South Korea	₩500,000,000	(United States) Edward Loar (2)	14	KOR	
19 Sep	Mercuries Taiwan Masters	Taiwan	390,000	(Thailand) Thaworn Wiratchant (4)	6		
26 Sep	Taiwan Open	Taiwan	300,000	(South Korea) Charlie Wi (6)	6		
24 Oct	Crowne Plaza Open	China	200,000	(Australia) Terry Pilkadaris (1)	6		New tournament
31 Oct	Sanya Open	China	250,000	(Australia) Terry Pilkadaris (2)	6		
7 Nov	Carlsberg Masters Vietnam	Vietnam	200,000	(Philippines) Angelo Que (1)	6		New tournament
28 Nov	Volvo China Open	China	1,000,000	(Wales) Stephen Dodd (n/a)	16	EUR	
5 Dec	Omega Hong Kong Open	Hong Kong	800,000	(Spain) Miguel Ángel Jiménez (n/a)	24	EUR	
12 Dec	Volvo Masters of Asia	Malaysia	550,000	(India) Jyoti Randhawa (5)	20		

== Order of Merit ==
The Order of Merit was based on prize money won during the season, calculated in U.S. dollars.

Position	Player	Prize money ($)
1	(Thailand) Thongchai Jaidee	381,930
2	(India) Jyoti Randhawa	351,710
3	(Scotland) Simon Yates	310,988
4	(Thailand) Thaworn Wiratchant	260,637
5	(Australia) Terry Pilkadaris	252,858

== Awards ==
Award	Winner	Ref.
Players' Player of the Year	(Thailand) Thongchai Jaidee	
Rookie of the Year	(Australia) Adam Groom	
