= 2017 PGA Tour of Australasia =

Golf tour season

2017 PGA Tour of Australasia season
- Duration: 1 February 2017 – 3 December 2017
- Number of official events: 15
- Most wins: (Australia) Dimitrios Papadatos (2)
- Order of Merit: (Australia) Brett Rumford
- Player of the Year: (Australia) Dimitrios Papadatos

The 2017 PGA Tour of Australasia, titled as the 2017 ISPS Handa PGA Tour of Australasia for sponsorship reasons, was the 44th season on the PGA Tour of Australasia, the main professional golf tour in Australia and New Zealand since it was formed in 1973.

== European Tour strategic alliance ==
In February, it was announced by the European Tour that they had entered into a strategic alliance with the PGA Tour of Australasia. As part of the alliance, it saw the leading player (not otherwise exempt) on the PGA Tour of Australasia Order of Merit gain European Tour status for the following season.

== Schedule ==
The following table lists official events during the 2019 season.

Date	Tournament	Location	Purse (A$)	Winner (Note: The number in brackets after each winner's name is the number of PGA Tour of Australasia events they had won up to and including that tournament. This information is only shown for PGA Tour of Australasia members.)	OWGR points	Other tours (Note: ASA − Asian Tour; EUR − European Tour.)	Notes
4 Feb	Victorian PGA Championship	Victoria	100,000	(Australia) Damien Jordan (1)	7		
12 Feb	Oates Vic Open	Victoria	500,000	(Australia) Dimitrios Papadatos (2)	16		
19 Feb	ISPS Handa World Super 6 Perth	Western Australia	1,750,000	(Australia) Brett Rumford (3)	23	ASA, EUR	
5 Mar	Lawnmaster Horizon Golf New Zealand PGA Championship	New Zealand	NZ$125,000	(Australia) Jarryd Felton (2)	7		
12 Mar	ISPS Handa New Zealand Open	New Zealand	NZ$1,000,000	(New Zealand) Michael Hendry (3)	16		
19 Mar	Coca-Cola Queensland PGA Championship	Queensland	125,000	(New Zealand) Daniel Pearce (1)	7		
7 May	SP Brewery PNG Golf Open	Papua New Guinea	142,000	(Australia) Cory Crawford (1)	6		
21 May	TX Civil & Logistics WA PGA Championship	Western Australia	110,000	(Australia) Dimitrios Papadatos (3)	6		
20 Aug	Fiji International	Fiji	1,500,000	(Australia) Jason Norris (2)	15	ASA, EUR	
3 Sep	Northern Territory PGA Championship	Northern Territory	150,000	(Australia) Travis Smyth (a) (1)	6		
22 Oct	Nexus Risk TSA Group WA Open	Western Australia	100,000	(Australia) Stephen Leaney (8)	6		
29 Oct	Isuzu Queensland Open	Queensland	110,000	(Australia) Michael Sim (1)	6		
19 Nov	NSW Open	New South Wales	400,000	(Australia) Jason Scrivener (1)	16		
26 Nov	Emirates Australian Open	New South Wales	1,250,000	(Australia) Cameron Davis (1)	32		Flagship event
3 Dec	Australian PGA Championship	Queensland	1,500,000	(Australia) Cameron Smith (1)	23	EUR	

== Order of Merit ==
The Order of Merit was based on prize money won during the season, calculated in Australian dollars. The leading player on the Order of Merit (not otherwise exempt) earned status to play on the 2018 European Tour.

Position	Player	Prize money (A$)	Status earned
1	(Australia) Brett Rumford	313,094	Already exempt (Note: Rumford and Norris were already exempt due to being tournament winners on the 2017 European Tour.)
2	(Australia) Adam Bland	292,571	Promoted to European Tour
3	(Australia) Jason Norris	273,306	Already exempt
4	(Australia) Cameron Davis	225,000	
5	(New Zealand) Michael Hendry	201,916	

== Awards ==
Award	Winner	Ref.
Player of the Year	(Australia) Dimitrios Papadatos	
