= Scott Laycock =

Australian professional golfer (born 1971)

Personal information
- Nationality: Australia
- Born: 15 September 1971 (age 55)
- Height: 1.80 m (5 ft 11 in)
- Weight: 92 kg (203 lb; 14.5 st)

Career
- Sport: Golf
- Turned professional: 1992
- Former tours: PGA Tour; Japan Golf Tour; PGA Tour of Australasia
- Professional wins: 5
- Highest ranking: 67 (17 February 2002)

Number of wins by tour
- Japan Golf Tour: 1
- PGA Tour of Australasia: 2
- Other: 2

Best results in major championships
- Masters Tournament: DNP
- PGA Championship: CUT: 2002
- U.S. Open: DNP
- The Open Championship: CUT: 2002, 2007

Achievements and awards
- Japan Golf Tour Rookie of the Year: 2001

Scott Laycock (born 15 September 1971) is an Australian professional golfer.

== Career ==
Laycock won the Victorian Open in 2001 in Australia. He shot an aggregate of 270, 18 under par. This was a tournament record, but has since been broken by Min Woo Lee at the 2020 ISPS Handa Vic Open, when he shot an aggregate of 269, 19 under par.

Laycock joined the Japan Golf Tour in 2000, and won Bridgestone Open in 2002. In 2003 he played on the PGA Tour but failed to maintain his playing rights. He has featured in the top 100 of the Official World Golf Rankings.

Laycock played in the PGA Championship once and The Open Championship twice between 2002–2007; missing the cut in all three of his major championship appearances.

== Professional wins (5) ==
=== Japan Golf Tour wins (1) ===
| No. | Date | Tournament | Winning score | Margin of victory | Runners-up |
|---|---|---|---|---|---|
| 1 | 27 Oct 2002 | Bridgestone Open | −16 (66-66-69-71=272) | 1 stroke | (Japan) Shingo Katayama, (Japan) Toru Taniguchi |

Japan Golf Tour playoff record (0–1)

| No. | Year | Tournament | Opponent | Result |
|---|---|---|---|---|
| 1 | 2002 | Fujisankei Classic | (Japan) Nobuhito Sato | Lost to par on second extra hole |

=== PGA Tour of Australasia wins (2) ===
| No. | Date | Tournament | Winning score | Margin of victory | Runner-up |
|---|---|---|---|---|---|
| 1 | 14 Jan 2001 | ANZ Victorian Open Championship | −18 (67-68-70-65=270) | 3 strokes | (Australia) Richard Green |
| 2 | 23 Jan 2011 | Surf Coast Knockout | 1 up | | (Australia) Andrew Buckle |

=== Other wins (1) ===
- 1997 Hugo Boss Foursomes

=== PGA of Australian Legends Tour wins (1) ===
- 2022 Gold Coast Senior PGA Championship

== Playoff record ==
Asian PGA Tour playoff record (0–1)

| No. | Year | Tournament | Opponent | Result |
|---|---|---|---|---|
| 1 | 1997 | ABN-AMRO Pakistan Masters | (Thailand) Thammanoon Sriroj | Lost to birdie on second extra hole |

OneAsia Tour playoff record (0–1)

| No. | Year | Tournament | Opponents | Result |
|---|---|---|---|---|
| 1 | 2011 | Nanshan China Masters | (Australia) Craig Hancock, (South Korea) Kim Bi-o, (New Zealand) Michael Long | Kim won with birdie on third extra hole Hancock eliminated by par on second hole Laycock eliminated by par on first hole |

== Results in major championships ==
| Tournament | 2002 | 2003 | 2004 | 2005 | 2006 | 2007 |
|---|---|---|---|---|---|---|
| The Open Championship | CUT | | | | | CUT |
| PGA Championship | CUT | | | | | |

Did not play

CUT = missed the halfway cut
Note: Laycock only played in The Open Championship and the PGA Championship.

== Results in World Golf Championships ==
| Tournament | 2002 |
|---|---|
| Match Play | |
| Championship | 60 |
| Invitational | |

Did not play

== See also ==
- 2002 PGA Tour Qualifying School graduates
