= James Nitties =

Australian professional golfer (born 1982)

Personal information
- Full name: James Evangelo Nitties
- Nationality: Australia
- Born: 23 October 1982 (age 44) Melbourne, Australia
- Height: 6 ft 1 in (1.85 m)
- Weight: 185 lb (84 kg; 13.2 st)

Career
- Sport: Golf
- Turned professional: 2004
- Current tours: PGA Tour of Australasia; Web.com Tour
- Former tour: PGA Tour
- Professional wins: 5

Number of wins by tour
- PGA Tour of Australasia: 2
- Korn Ferry Tour: 1
- Other: 2

Best results in major championships
- Masters Tournament: DNP
- PGA Championship: DNP
- U.S. Open: CUT: 2009
- The Open Championship: DNP

James Evangelo Nitties (born 23 October 1982) is an Australian professional golfer who has played on the PGA Tour and now plays on the PGA Tour of Australasia.

== Amateur career ==
Nitties was born in Melbourne, Australia. He suffered from juvenile arthritis as a child and young adult, which restricted his flexibility. This caused him to have to take pain killers to restrict the pain from his back. In 2003, he won the New Zealand Amateur and finished second at the Western Amateur to Ryan Moore in 19 holes.

== Professional career ==
In 2004, Nitties turned professional. That year he joined the NGA Hooters Tour where he played for three years, winning once. While he played the Hooters Tour, he played a select few of events on the Nationwide Tour and the PGA Tour of Australasia.

Nitties took part on the Golf Channel's series The Big Break: Mesquite where he was eliminated during the 7th episode.

Nitties qualified for the PGA Tour in 2009 by finishing in a tie for second at Q-school with Derek Fathauer, behind Harrison Frazar. He had success in his rookie season on the PGA Tour in 2009, with two top ten finishes early at the FBR Open, where he held the first round lead and the Mayakoba Golf Classic at Riviera Maya-Cancun. He also shared the opening round lead at the HP Byron Nelson Championship. He retained his tour card, finishing 96th on the money list.

Nitties won the 2011 Midwest Classic on the Nationwide Tour. He finished 26th on the Nationwide Tour's money list, one spot short of a promotion to the PGA Tour.

On 8 February 2019, Nitties matched the world record of nine consecutive birdies in the ISPS Handa Vic Open. His birdie run from the 15th to the fifth in the first round set a European Tour record and matched Mark Calcavecchia's feat in the 2009 Canadian Open.

== Professional wins (5) ==
=== PGA Tour of Australasia wins (2) ===
| No. | Date | Tournament | Winning score | Margin of victory | Runner-up |
|---|---|---|---|---|---|
| 1 | 16 Jan 2011 | Victorian PGA Championship | −18 (63-66-69=198) | 1 stroke | (Australia) Peter O'Malley |
| 2 | 3 Oct 2015 | South Pacific Open Championship | −16 (65-67-67-69=268) | 6 strokes | (Australia) Matthew Millar |

=== Nationwide Tour wins (1) ===
| No. | Date | Tournament | Winning score | Margin of victory | Runners-up |
|---|---|---|---|---|---|
| 1 | 21 Aug 2011 | Midwest Classic | −26 (65-63-65-65=258) | 5 strokes | (Sweden) Jonas Blixt, (Australia) Nick Flanagan |

=== NGA Hooters Tour wins (1) ===
| No. | Date | Tournament | Winning score | Margin of victory | Runners-up |
|---|---|---|---|---|---|
| 1 | 18 Jun 2006 | Base Camp Realty/Chesdin Landing Open | −16 (71-68-65-68=272) | 2 strokes | (United States) John Kimbell, (Australia) Aron Price |

=== Other wins (1) ===
| No. | Date | Tournament | Winning score | Margin of victory | Runner-up |
|---|---|---|---|---|---|
| 1 | 24 Oct 2008 | Aspen Group WA Open Championship | −9 (67-68=135) | 2 strokes | (Australia) Michael Dennis (a) |

== Results in major championships ==
| Tournament | 2009 |
|---|---|
| U.S. Open | CUT |

Note: Nitties only played in the U.S. Open.
CUT = missed the half-way cut

== Team appearances ==
Amateur

- Nomura Cup (representing Australia): 2003 (winners)
- Eisenhower Trophy (representing Australia): 2004
- Bonallack Trophy (representing Asia/Pacific): 2004 (winners)
- Australian Men's Interstate Teams Matches (representing New South Wales): 2002 (winners), 2003, 2004

== See also ==
- 2008 PGA Tour Qualifying School graduates
