= Matthew Griffin (golfer) =

Australian professional golfer

Personal information
- Nationality: Australia
- Born: 26 July 1983 (age 43)
- Height: 1.76 m (5 ft 9 in)
- Weight: 76 kg (168 lb; 12.0 st)

Career
- Sport: Golf
- College: Monash University
- Turned professional: 2008
- Current tour: PGA Tour of Australasia
- Former tours: Japan Golf Tour; OneAsia Tour; Korean Tour
- Professional wins: 8

Number of wins by tour
- PGA Tour of Australasia: 4
- Other: 4

Best results in major championships
- Masters Tournament: DNP
- PGA Championship: DNP
- U.S. Open: DNP
- The Open Championship: CUT: 2017, 2022

Achievements and awards
- OneAsia Tour Order of Merit winner: 2013
- PGA Tour of Australasia Order of Merit winner: 2016

Matthew Griffin (born 26 July 1983) is an Australian professional golfer.

== Career ==
In 1983, Griffin was born in Melbourne, Australia. He attended Monash University.

In 2008, Griffin turned professional. He plays on the PGA Tour of Australasia where he has won four times. Griffin formerly played on the OneAsia Tour where he won twice and won the Order of Merit in 2013. On 14 July 2014, Griffin won the Yamaha Hankyung KPGA Championship on the Korean Tour.

== Awards and honors ==
- In 2013, Griffin earned Order of Merit honors on the OneAsia Tour.
- In 2016, he earned Order of Merit honors on the PGA Tour of Australasia.

== Professional wins (8) ==
=== PGA Tour of Australasia wins (4) ===
No.	Date	Tournament	Winning score	Margin of victory	Runner(s)-up
1	17 Sep 2011	South Pacific Open	−15 (70-69-67-67=273)	Playoff	(Australia) Terry Pilkadaris
2	23 Feb 2014	Oates Victorian Open Championship	−7 (74-71-68-68=281)	Playoff	(Australia) Matt Stieger
3	13 Mar 2016	BMW ISPS Handa New Zealand Open	−20 (70-65-65-67=267)	1 stroke	(Japan) Hideto Tanihara
4	14 Jan 2024	Heritage Classic	−24 (61-65-69-69=264)	6 strokes	(Australia) Jak Carter, (Australia) Quinnton Croker

PGA Tour of Australasia playoff record (2–0)

No.	Year	Tournament	Opponent	Result
1	2011	South Pacific Open	(Australia) Terry Pilkadaris	Won with birdie on second extra hole
2	2014	Oates Victorian Open Championship	(Australia) Matt Stieger	Won with birdie on third extra hole

=== OneAsia Tour wins (3) ===
No.	Date	Tournament	Winning score	Margin of victory	Runner(s)-up
1	9 Sep 2012	Charity High 1 Open^{1}	−10 (67-70-69-72=278)	1 stroke	(South Korea) Park Sang-hyun, (South Korea) Kang Kyung-nam
2	19 May 2013	SK Telecom Open^{1}	−13 (64-67-72=203) (Note: Shortened to 54 holes due to weather.)	1 stroke	(South Korea) Kang Wook-soon

^{1}Co-sanctioned by the Korean Tour

=== Korean Tour wins (3) ===
No.	Date	Tournament	Winning score	Margin of victory	Runner(s)-up
1	9 Sep 2012	Charity High 1 Open^{1}	−10 (67-70-69-72=278)	1 stroke	(South Korea) Park Sang-hyun, (South Korea) Kang Kyung-nam
2	19 May 2013	SK Telecom Open^{1}	−13 (64-67-72=203)	1 stroke	(South Korea) Kang Wook-soon
3	13 Jul 2014	Yamaha Hankyung KPGA Championship	−20 (69-67-66-66=268)	3 strokes	(South Korea) Moon Kyong-jun

^{1}Co-sanctioned by the OneAsia Tour

=== Other wins (1) ===
- 2009 Fiji Open

== Results in major championships ==
Tournament	2017	2018	2019	2020	2021	2022
The Open Championship	CUT			NT		CUT

Did not play

CUT = missed the half-way cut
NT = No tournament due to the COVID-19 pandemic
Note: Griffin only played in The Open Championship.

== Results in World Golf Championships ==
Tournament	2017
Championship	75
Match Play	
Invitational	
Champions	T67

Did not play

== Team appearances ==
Amateur

- Eisenhower Trophy (representing Australia): 2008
- Sloan Morpeth Trophy (representing Australia): 2008 (winners)
- Australian Men's Interstate Teams Matches (representing Victoria): 2006, 2007, 2008 (winners)
