= 2011 PGA Tour of Australasia =

Golf tour season

2011 PGA Tour of Australasia season
- Duration: 7 January 2011 – 18 December 2011
- Number of official events: 13
- Most wins: (Australia) Greg Chalmers (2)
- Order of Merit: (Australia) Greg Chalmers

The 2011 PGA Tour of Australasia was the 38th season on the PGA Tour of Australasia, the main professional golf tour in Australia and New Zealand since it was formed in 1973.

== Schedule ==
The following table lists official events during the 2011 season.

Date	Tournament	Location	Purse (A$)	Winner (Note: The number in brackets after each winner's name is the number of PGA Tour of Australasia events they had won up to and including that tournament. This information is only shown for PGA Tour of Australasia members.)	OWGR points	Other tours (Note: ONE − OneAsia Tour.)	Notes
10 Jan	Victorian Open	Victoria	120,000	(Australia) Paul Sheehan (2)	n/a		
16 Jan	Victorian PGA Championship	Victoria	110,000	(Australia) James Nitties (1)	n/a		
23 Jan	Surf Coast Knockout	Victoria	135,000	(Australia) Scott Laycock (2)	n/a		New tournament
27 Jan	Cellarbrations Queensland PGA Championship	Queensland	115,000	(New Zealand) Gareth Paddison (2)	n/a		
17 Oct	South Pacific Open	New Caledonia	110,000	(Australia) Matthew Griffin (1)	n/a		New tournament
23 Oct	Brunel WA PGA Championship	Western Australia	110,000	(Australia) Michael Wright (1)	n/a		
30 Oct	WA Open Championship	Western Australia	110,000	(Australia) Rohan Blizard (1)	n/a		
6 Nov	NSW PGA Championship	New South Wales	120,000	(Australia) Matthew Guyatt (1)	n/a		
13 Nov	Emirates Australian Open	New South Wales	1,500,000	(Australia) Greg Chalmers (3)	42	ONE	Flagship event
20 Nov	NSW Open	New South Wales	135,000	(Australia) Adam Crawford (1)	n/a		
27 Nov	Australian PGA Championship	Queensland	1,500,000	(Australia) Greg Chalmers (4)	34	ONE	
4 Dec	BMW New Zealand Open	New Zealand	NZ$400,000	(Australia) Brad Kennedy (2)	16		
18 Dec	JBWere Masters	Victoria	1,000,000	(England) Ian Poulter (n/a)	32		

== Order of Merit ==
The Order of Merit was based on prize money won during the season, calculated in Australian dollars.

Position	Player	Prize money (A$)
1	(Australia) Greg Chalmers	554,285
2	(Australia) Marcus Fraser	229,125
3	(Australia) John Senden	204,285
4	(Australia) Robert Allenby	141,410
5	(Australia) Brad Kennedy	134,833
