= Jake McLeod =

Australian professional golfer (born 1994)

Personal information
- Full name: Jake Ian McLeod
- Nationality: Australia
- Born: 13 August 1994 (age 32) Townsville, Queensland, Australia
- Weight: 178 lb (81 kg; 12.7 st)

Career
- Sport: Golf
- Turned professional: 2015
- Current tours: PGA Tour of Australasia; European Tour
- Professional wins: 1

Best results in major championships
- Masters Tournament: DNP
- PGA Championship: DNP
- U.S. Open: DNP
- The Open Championship: CUT: 2019

Achievements and awards
- PGA Tour of Australasia Order of Merit winner: 2018

Jake Ian McLeod (born 13 August 1994) is an Australian professional golfer currently playing on the PGA Tour of Australasia. In 2018, he won the tour's Order of Merit, the same year he received his first professional win.

== Career ==
McLeod turned professional in 2015. His first professional win came in 2018 at the New South Wales Open, beating Cameron John by two strokes. His 62 in the third round of the tournament beat the course record at Twin Creeks Golf and Country Club.

McLeod won the Order of Merit on the PGA Tour of Australasia in 2018, earning a one-year exemption to the PGA European Tour in 2019 and an invitation to the 2019 Open Championship.

== Professional wins (1) ==
=== PGA Tour of Australasia wins (1) ===
No.	Date	Tournament	Winning score	Margin of victory	Runner-up
1	11 Nov 2018	AVJennings NSW Open	−20 (67-68-62-71=268)	2 strokes	(Australia) Cameron John

PGA Tour of Australasia playoff record (0–1)

No.	Year	Tournament	Opponent	Result
1	2016	South Pacific Open Championship	(Australia) Adam Blyth	Lost to par on third extra hole

== Results in major championships ==
Tournament	2019
Masters Tournament	
PGA Championship	
U.S. Open	
The Open Championship	CUT

Did not play

CUT = missed the halfway cut

== Results in World Golf Championships ==
Tournament	2019
Championship	T45
Match Play	
Invitational	
Champions	T57

Did not play

"T" = Tied

== Team appearances ==
Amateur

- Australian Men's Interstate Teams Matches (representing Queensland): 2013 (winners), 2014, 2015

== See also ==
- 2019 European Tour Qualifying School graduates
