= 2016 PGA Tour of Australasia =

Golf tour season

2016 PGA Tour of Australasia season
- Duration: 4 February 2016 – 4 December 2016
- Number of official events: 16
- Most wins: (Australia) Adam Blyth (2)
- Order of Merit: (Australia) Matthew Griffin
- Player of the Year: (Australia) Adam Blyth

The 2016 PGA Tour of Australasia, titled as the 2016 ISPS Handa PGA Tour of Australasia for sponsorship reasons, was the 43rd season on the PGA Tour of Australasia, the main professional golf tour in Australia and New Zealand since it was formed in 1973.

== ISPS Handa title sponsorship ==
In June, it was announced that the tour had signed a title sponsorship agreement with ISPS Handa, being renamed as the ISPS Handa PGA Tour of Australasia.

== Schedule ==
The following table lists official events during the 2016 season.

Date	Tournament	Location	Purse (A$)	Winner (Note: The number in brackets after each winner's name is the number of PGA Tour of Australasia events they had won up to and including that tournament. This information is only shown for PGA Tour of Australasia members.)	OWGR points	Other tours (Note: ASA − Asian Tour; EUR − European Tour; ONE − OneAsia Tour.)	Notes
7 Feb	Oates Vic Open	Victoria	300,000	(New Zealand) Michael Long (3)	7		
12 Feb	Mercedes-Benz Truck and Bus Victorian PGA Championship	Victoria	110,000	(Australia) Ashley Hall (3)	6		
28 Feb	ISPS Handa Perth International	Western Australia	1,750,000	(South Africa) Louis Oosthuizen (n/a)	23	ASA, EUR	
6 Mar	Holden New Zealand PGA Championship	New Zealand	NZ$125,000	(Australia) Brad Kennedy (4)	7		
13 Mar	BMW ISPS Handa New Zealand Open	New Zealand	NZ$1,000,000	(Australia) Matthew Griffin (3)	16		
20 Mar	Coca-Cola Queensland PGA Championship	Queensland	125,000	(Germany) David Klein (1)	6		
24 Apr	South Pacific Export Radler PNG Open	Papua New Guinea	140,000	(Australia) Brad Moules (1)	6		New to PGA Tour of Australasia
1 May	Nexus Risk TSA Group WA Open	Western Australia	100,000	(Australia) Curtis Luck (a) (1)	6		
15 May	TX Civil & Logistics WA PGA Championship	Western Australia	120,000	(Australia) Stephen Dartnall (1)	6		
14 Aug	Northern Territory PGA Championship	Northern Territory	150,000	(Australia) Jordan Zunic (2)	6		New to PGA Tour of Australasia
24 Sep	South Pacific Open Championship	New Caledonia	140,000	(Australia) Adam Blyth (1)	6		
9 Oct	Fiji International	Fiji	1,500,000	(United States) Brandt Snedeker (n/a)	16	EUR	
23 Oct	Isuzu Queensland Open	Queensland	110,000	(Australia) Brett Coletta (a) (1)	6		
13 Nov	NSW Open	New South Wales	400,000	(Australia) Adam Blyth (2)	16		
20 Nov	Emirates Australian Open	New South Wales	1,250,000	(United States) Jordan Spieth (n/a)	32	ONE	Flagship event
4 Dec	Australian PGA Championship	Queensland	1,500,000	(United States) Harold Varner III (n/a)	22	EUR	

== Order of Merit ==
The Order of Merit was based on prize money won during the season, calculated in Australian dollars.

Position	Player	Prize money (A$)
1	(Australia) Matthew Griffin	239,445
2	(New Zealand) Michael Hendry	223,364
3	(Australia) Ashley Hall	216,513
4	(Australia) Andrew Dodt	168,660
5	(Australia) Jason Scrivener	160,086

== Awards ==
Award	Winner	Ref.
Player of the Year	(Australia) Adam Blyth	
