= PGA Tour China =

Professional golf tour

- Formerly: Ping An Bank China Tour-PGA Tour China Series
- Sport: Golf
- Founded: 2014
- Founder: PGA Tour
- First season: 2014
- Folded: 2020
- Country: Based in China (Note: Schedules have included events in Hong Kong, Macau and Thailand.)
- Most titles: Tournament wins: (China) Dou Zecheng (4) (United States) Charlie Saxon (4)
- Related competitions: China Tour; PGA Tour Canada; PGA Tour Latinoamérica

PGA Tour China was a third level professional golf tour formed in 2014 and operated by the PGA Tour. After a hiatus in 2017, the tour resumed in 2018. After canceling its entire 2020 season due to the COVID-19 pandemic, the tour effectively ceased operation.

== History ==
The United States–based PGA Tour formed the tour in 2014, joining PGA Tour Canada and PGA Tour Latinoamérica as their international developmental tours. Similar to the Canadian and Latinoamérica tours, PGA Tour China offered a path to the Korn Ferry Tour for top finishers. It also offered Official World Golf Ranking points to the top-six finishers at each tournament. The top five finishers on the Order of Merit at the end of the season received promotion to the Korn Ferry Tour.

In January 2014, PGA Tour China announced qualifying procedures and a 12-event season to begin in April. Two 72-hole qualifying tournaments were played in March. Each event awarded 20 full-time Tour cards, and conditional cards to the next 20 players plus those tied. For its inaugural season, PGA Tour China gave exemptions to the top 70 according to the China Golf Association rankings. After the 40 qualifiers and 70 from the rankings, the balance of the fields were filled through sponsor exemptions, Monday qualifiers and eligible players from the Web.com Tour, PGA Tour Latinoamérica, and PGA Tour Canada. Zhang Lianwei hit the first tee shot in PGA Tour China history.

In April 2015, Ping An Bank became the title sponsor of the tour, being renamed as the Ping An Bank China Tour-PGA Tour China Series.

== Order of Merit winners ==
Year	Winner	Prize money (CN¥)
2020	Cancelled due to the COVID-19 pandemic	
2019	(United States) Max McGreevy	974,153
2018	(England) Callum Tarren	1,094,600
2016	(China) Dou Zecheng	1,144,350
2015	(Australia) Bryden Macpherson	769,960
2014	(China) Li Haotong	967,788
