= WPGA Tour of Australasia =

Women's professional golf tour

The WPGA Tour of Australasia, formerly known as the ALPG Tour, is a professional golf tour for women which is based in Australia. WPGA stands for Women's Professional Golfers' Association.

The tour was founded as the Ladies Professional Golf Association of Australia (LPGAA) in 1972 by Alan Gillott, who also later on founded The Golfer newspaper, a free publication provided to golfers and golf clubs, Australia-wide. The LPGAA switched to ALPG Tour in 1991. The first events featured twelve competitors, and the early years were a struggle. However the long-term trend was of gradual expansion and by 2004 there were over 150 members.

The season features about a dozen tournaments, usually played over the Australian summer between November and March. The Women's Australian Open havs long been the leading events on the tour, being co-sanctioned with the more prestigious Ladies European Tour (LET) which helps attract a higher quality field. In 2010 the New Zealand Women's Open became the third tournament to be co-sanctioned by the LET. The Women's Australian Open has also previously been co-sanctioned by the U.S. LPGA Tour.

Australian Karrie Webb, who was one of the leading players in global women's golf, had a background on the tour, and continued to play in its two main events several seasons. However Webb, as well as other leading members of the ALPG, did spend most of the year competing outside Australia, principally on the LPGA Tour and the Ladies European Tour.

In January 2012, New Zealand's Lydia Ko became the youngest person ever to win a professional golf tour event by winning the ALPG-sanctioned Bing Lee Samsung Women's NSW Open.

In 2021, the ALPG Tour switched to its current name – WPGA Tour of Australasia.

== 2009 Schedule and results ==
| Dates | Tournament | Location | Winner | Other tours (Note: AUS - PGA Tour of Australasia, CLPGA − China LPGA Tour, JLPGA − LPGA of Japan Tour, LET − Ladies European Tour, LPGA − LPGA Tour, ThaiLPGA Thai LPGA Tour, TGT - TrustGolf Tour.)! |
|---|---|---|---|---|
| Nov 21, 2008 | Aristocrat Mollymook Women's Classic | Mollymook Hilltop Golf Club | (Australia) Kate Little (1) | |
| Nov 27–28, 2008 | St Georges Basin Country Club Pro-Am | St Georges Basin Country Club | (Australia) Rachel L. Bailey (1) | |
| Dec 4–5, 2008 | Moss Vale Ladies Classic | Moss Vale Golf Club | (New Zealand) Stacey Tate (n/a) | |
| Dec 8, 2008 | Castle Hill Country Club Pro-Am | Castle Hill Country Club | (Australia) Angela Tatt (n/a) | |
| Jan 12–13 | Peugeot Kangaroo Valley ALPG Classic | Kangaroo Valley Resort | (Australia) Karen Lunn (3) | |
| Jan 15 | ActewAGL Royal Canberra Pro-Am | Royal Canberra Golf Club | (Australia) Sarah Kemp (5) | |
| Jan 17–18 | Xstrata Coal Branxton Golf Club Pro-Am | Branxton Golf Club | (Australia) Rachel L. Bailey (2) | |
| Jan 23–25 | LG Bing Lee Women's NSW Open | Oatlands Golf Club | (South Korea) Sarah Oh (2) | |
| Jan 30 – Feb 1 | New Zealand Women's Open | Clearwater Resort | (France) Gwladys Nocera (n/a) | |
| Feb 5–8 | ANZ Ladies Masters | RACV Royal Pines Resort | (Australia) Katherine Hull (4) | LET |
| Feb 12–15 | Women's Australian Open | Metropolitan Golf Club | (England) Laura Davies (n/a) | LET |

== 2010 Schedule and results ==
| Dates | Tournament | Location | Winner | Other tours |
|---|---|---|---|---|
| Dec 3–4, 2009 | St Georges Basin Country Club Pro-Am | St Georges Basin Country Club | (Australia) Kate Little (2) | |
| Dec 7, 2009 | Castle Hill Country Club Pro-Am | Castle Hill Country Club | (Australia) Tamara Johns (4) | |
| Dec 8, 2009 | Lady Anne Funerals ALPG Pro-Am | Ryde-Parramatta Golf Club | (Australia) Sarah Kemp (6) | |
| Dec 12–13, 2009 | Xstrata Coal Branxton Golf Club Pro-Am | Branxton Golf Club | (Australia) Sarah Kemp (7) | |
| Jan 21–22 | Moss Vale Ladies Classic | Moss Vale Golf Club | (Australia) Vicky Thomas (3) | |
| Jan 25 | Kangaroo Valley Resort ALPG Classic | Kangaroo Valley Resort | (England) Laura Davies (n/a) | |
| Jan 29–31 | ActewAGL Royal Canberra Ladies Classic | Royal Canberra Golf Club | (Australia) Kristie Smith (2) | |
| Feb 25–28 | Pegasus New Zealand Women's Open | Pegasus Golf Course | (England) Laura Davies (n/a) | LET |
| Mar 4–7 | ANZ Ladies Masters | RACV Royal Pines Resort | (Australia) Karrie Webb (11) | LET |
| Mar 11–14 | Women's Australian Open | Commonwealth Golf Club | (Taiwan) Yani Tseng (n/a) | LET |
| Jul 5–7 | Bing Lee Samsung NSW Women's Open | Oatlands Golf Club | (South Korea) Sarah Oh (3) | |

== 2011 Schedule and results ==
| Dates | Tournament | Location | Winner | Other tours |
|---|---|---|---|---|
| Dec 2–3, 2010 | St Georges Basin Country Club Pro-Am | St Georges Basin Country Club | (Australia) Joanne Mills (7) | |
| Jan 8–9 | Xstrata Coal Branxton Golf Club Pro-Am | Branxton Golf Club | (Australia) Rachel L. Bailey (2) | |
| Jan 12 | NRE Gujarat Russell Vale Challenge Cup | Russell Vale Golf Club | (United States) Ryann O'Toole (n/a) | |
| Jan 13–14 | Moss Vale Ladies Classic | Moss Vale Golf Club | (Australia) Katherine Hull (5) | |
| Jan 16–17 | Mount Broughton Classic | Mount Broughton Golf and Country Club | (Australia) Katherine Hull (6) | |
| Jan 21–23 | Bing Lee Samsung NSW Women's Open | Oatlands Golf Club | (Sweden) Caroline Hedwall (n/a) | |
| Jan 28–30 | ActewAGL Royal Canberra Ladies Classic | Royal Canberra Golf Club | (Australia) Ashley Ona (n/a) | |
| Feb 3–6 | Women's Australian Open | Commonwealth Golf Club | (Taiwan) Yani Tseng (n/a) | LET |
| Feb 10–13 | ANZ RACV Ladies Masters | RACV Royal Pines Resort | (Taiwan) Yani Tseng (n/a) | LET |
| Feb 17–20 | Pegasus New Zealand Women's Open | Pegasus Golf and Sports Club | (Australia) Kristie Smith (2) | LET |
| Feb 24 | Lady Anne Funerals Ryde Parramatta Pro-Am | Ryde Parramatta Golf Club | (Australia) Sarah Kemp (8) | |

== 2012 Schedule and results ==
| Dates | Tournament | Location | Winner | WWGR points | Other tours |
|---|---|---|---|---|---|
| Nov 24, 2011 | Hahn Premium Light & Konami Port Kembla Golf Club Pro-Am | Pork Kembla Golf Club | (Australia) Stacey Keating (1) | | |
| Nov 25, 2011 | Power Ford Castle Hill Country Club Pro-Am | Castle Hill Country Club | (Australia) Bree Arthur (1) | | |
| Nov 27–28, 2011 | Mount Broughton Ladies Classic | Mount Broughton Golf and Country Club | (Australia) Stacey Keating (2) | | |
| Nov 29, 2011 | Lady Anne Funerals ALPG Pro-Am | Ryde-Parramatta Golf Club | (Australia) Bree Arthur (2) | | |
| Dec 3–4, 2011 | Xstrata Coal Branxton Golf Club Pro-Am | Branxton Golf Club | (Australia) Tamara Johns (5) | | |
| Jan 6–8 | Women's Victorian Open | Woodlands/Spring Valley Golf Club | (France) Joanna Klatten (1) | | |
| Jan 20–22 | ActewAGL Royal Canberra Ladies Classic | Royal Canberra Golf Club | (Australia) Karen Lunn (4) | | |
| Jan 27–29 | Bing Lee Samsung Women's NSW Open | Oatlands Golf Club | (New Zealand) Lydia Ko (a, n/a) | | |
| Feb 2–5 | Gold Coast RACV Australian Ladies Masters | RACV Royal Pines Resort | (Netherlands) Christel Boeljon (n/a) | 15.5 | LET |
| Feb 9–12 | ISPS Handa Women's Australian Open | Royal Melbourne Golf Club | (United States) Jessica Korda (n/a) | 43 | LET, LPGA |
| Feb 17–19 | ISPS Handa New Zealand Women's Open | Pegasus Golf Course | (Australia) Lindsey Wright (2) | 16 | LET |

== 2013 Schedule and results ==
| Dates | Tournament | Location | Winner | WWGR points | Other tours |
|---|---|---|---|---|---|
| Jan 14–15 | The Vintage Golf Club Pro-Am | The Vintage Golf Club | (Australia) Stacey Keating (3) | | |
| Jan 17 | Ingham Antill Park Ladies Pro-Am | Antill Park Country Golf Club | (Australia) Emma De Groot (1) | | |
| Jan 19–20 | Mount Broughton Classic | Mount Broughton Golf and Country Club | (Sweden) Caroline Hedwall (n/a) | | |
| Jan 25–27 | Bing Lee Samsung Women's New South Wales Open | Oatlands Golf Club | (Sweden) Caroline Hedwall (n/a) | | |
| Feb 1–3 | Volvik RACV Ladies Masters | RACV Royal Pines Resort | (Australia) Karrie Webb (12) | 15 | LET |
| Feb 8–10 | ISPS Handa New Zealand Women's Open | Clearwater Golf Club | (New Zealand) Lydia Ko (a, n/a) | 15 | LET |
| Feb 14–17 | ISPS Handa Women's Australian Open | Royal Canberra Golf Club | (South Korea) Jiyai Shin (n/a) | 37 | LET, LPGA |
| Feb 21–24 | Women's Victorian Open | Thirteenth Beach Golf Links | (Australia) Stacey Keating (4) | | |

== 2014 Schedule and results ==
| Dates | Tournament | Location | Winner | WWGR points | Other tours |
|---|---|---|---|---|---|
| Oct 31, 2013 | Anita Boon Pro-Am | North Shore Golf Club | (Australia) Karen Pearce (1) | – | |
| Jan 7 | BWAC Regional Employment & Community Services ALPG Pro-Am | Yamba Golf and Country Club | (France) Joanna Klatten (2) | – | |
| Jan 10 | Ingham's Antill Park Pro-Am | Antill Park Country Golf Club | (France) Joanna Klatten (3) | – | |
| Jan 13–14 | Moss Vale Ladies Classic | Moss Vale Golf Club | (Australia) Bree Arthur (3) | – | |
| Jan 17–18 | Mount Broughton Classic | Mount Broughton Golf and Country Club | (Sweden) Daniela Holmqvist (n/a) | – | |
| Jan 20 | Renault Ladies Pro-Am | Castle Hill Country Club | (Scotland) Kylie Walker (n/a) | – | |
| Jan 24–26 | Bing Lee Fujitsu General Women's New South Wales Open | Oatlands Golf Club | (France) Joanna Klatten (4) | 15 | |
| Jan 31 – Feb 2 | ISPS Handa New Zealand Women's Open | Clearwater Golf Club | (South Korea) Mi Hyang Lee (n/a) | 16.5 | LET |
| Feb 6–9 | Volvik RACV Ladies Masters | RACV Royal Pines Resort | (United States) Cheyenne Woods (n/a) | 19 | LET |
| Feb 13–16 | ISPS Handa Women's Australian Open | Victoria Golf Club | (Australia) Karrie Webb (13) | 43 | LET, LPGA |
| Feb 20–23 | Oates Women's Victorian Open | Thirteenth Beach Golf Club | (Australia) Minjee Lee (a, n/a) | 15 | |

== 2015 Schedule and results ==
| Dates | Tournament | Location | Winner | WWGR points | Other tours |
|---|---|---|---|---|---|
| Nov 13–14, 2014 | Anita Boon Pro-Am | North Shore Golf Club | (Australia) Cherie Alison (1) | – | |
| Jan 9 | BWAC Regional Employment & Community Services ALPG Pro-Am | Yamba Golf and Country Club | (Australia) Nikki Garrett (2) | – | |
| Jan 12–13 | McLeod ALPG Pro-Am | McLeod Country Golf Club | (New Zealand) Liv Cheng (1) (tie) (Australia) Sarah Kemp (9) | – | |
| Jan 22–23 | Moss Vale Ladies Classic | Moss Vale Golf Club | (South Korea) Sarah Oh (4) | – | |
| Jan 29 | Renault Ladies Pro-Am | Castle Hill Country Club | (France) Marion Ricordeau (n/a) | – | |
| Jan 30 | Pennant Hills ALPG Pro-Am | Pennant Hills Golf Club | (United States) Beth Allen (n/a) | – | |
| Feb 5–8 | Oates Women's Victorian Open | 13th Beach Golf | (Norway) Marianne Skarpnord (n/a) | 15 | |
| Feb 12–15 | Volvik RACV Ladies Masters | RACV Royal Pines Resort | (Australia) Su-Hyun Oh (1) | 15 | LET |
| Feb 19–22 | ISPS Handa Women's Australian Open | Royal Melbourne Golf Club | (New Zealand) Lydia Ko (3) | 37 | LET, LPGA |
| Feb 27 – Mar 1 | ISPS Handa New Zealand Women's Open | Clearwater Golf Club | (New Zealand) Lydia Ko (4) | 19 | LET |
| Mar 6–8 | Bing Lee Fujitsu NSW Women's Open | Oatlands Golf Club | (England) Holly Clyburn (1) | 15 | |
| Apr 17–19 | Australia Classic | Twin Creeks Golf and Country Club | (China) Pan Yan-hong (1) | 6 | |

== 2016 Schedule and results ==
| Dates | Tournament | Location | Winner | WWGR points | Other tours | Notes |
|---|---|---|---|---|---|---|
| Nov 12–13, 2015 | Anita Boon Pro Am | North Shore Golf Club, New Zealand | (Australia) Stacey Keating (5) | – | | |
| Dec 4–6, 2015 | The Queens | Miyoshi Country Club, Aichi, Japan | LPGA of Japan | – | JLPGA, KLPGA, LET | Unofficial team event (Note: Unofficial money, not counted towards the Order of Merit) |
| Jan 7–8 | Moss Vale Ladies Classic | Moss Vale Golf Club | (Brazil) Miriam Nagl (1) | – | | |
| Jan 9–10 | Mt Broughton Ladies Classic | Mount Broughton Golf and Country Club | (England) Felicity Johnson (n/a) | – | | |
| Jan 14–15 | Bing Lee Fujitsu General Pro Am | Oatlands Golf Club | (Australia) Stacey Keating (6) | – | | |
| Jan 19–19 | Mulpha Norwest Ladies Pro Am | Castle Hill Golf and Country Club | (New Zealand) Cathryn Bristow (2) | – | | |
| Jan 21–22 | Gold Key Financial Ladies Pro Am | Pennant Hills Golf Club | (Latvia) Laura Jansone (1) | – | | |
| Jan 25 | North Shore Ladies Pro Am | Long Reef Golf Club | (New Zealand) Cathryn Bristow (3) | – | | |
| Feb 4–7 | Oates Victorian Open | 13th Beach Golf Links | (England) Georgia Hall (n/a) | 8 | | |
| Feb 11–14 | ISPS Handa New Zealand Women's Open | Clearwater Golf Club, Christchurch | (New Zealand) Lydia Ko (5) | 16 | LET | |
| Feb 18–21 | ISPS Handa Women's Australian Open | The Grange Golf Club (West Course) | (Japan) Haru Nomura (n/a) | 26 | LET, LPGA | |
| Feb 25–28 | RACV Ladies Masters | Royal Pines Resort | (South Korea) Jiyai Shin (n/a) | 17.5 | LET | |
| Mar 1–2 | Brisbane Invitational | McLeod Country Golf Club | (Australia) Stacey Keating (7) | – | | |
| Mar 4 | BWAC Regional Services ALPG Pro Am | Yamba Golf and Country Club | (Australia) Katelyn Must (1) | – | | |

== 2017 Schedule and results ==
| Dates | Tournament | Location | Winner | WWGR points | Purse ($) | Other tours | Notes |
|---|---|---|---|---|---|---|---|
| Sep 21–23, 2016 | Thailand LPGA Masters | Panya Indra Golf Club, Bangkok, Thailand | (Thailand) Pannarat Thanapolboonyaras (n/a) | – | 150,000 | ThaiLPGA | Unofficial money event |
| Nov 17–18, 2016 | Anita Boon Pro Am | North Shore Golf Club, New Zealand | (New Zealand) Jenna Hunter (1) | – | 37,587 | | |
| Dec 2–4, 2016 | The Queens | Miyoshi Country Club, Aichi, Japan | (South Korea) LPGA of Korea | – | €750,000 | JLPGA, KLPGA, LET | Unofficial team event |
| Jan 17 | Mulpha Norwest Ladies Pro Am | Castle Hill Country Club, NSW | (Australia) Emily McLennan (1) | – | 25,000 | | |
| Jan 19–20 | GoldKey Financial Pro Am | Pennant Hills Golf Club, NSW | (Australia) Hannah Green | – | 30,000 | | |
| Jan 23–24 | Oatlands Ladies Pro Am | Oatlands Golf Club, NSW | (Scotland) Gemma Dryburgh (1) | – | 30,000 | | |
| Jan 30 | Hope Island Pro Am | Links Hope Island, Queensland | (Australia) Rebecca Artis (Australia) Hannah Green | – | 25,000 | | |
| Feb 2–4 | RACV Gold Coast Challenge | RACV Royal Pines Resort, Queensland | (Thailand) Prima Thammaraks | 6 | 150,000 | | |
| Feb 9–12 | Oates Vic Open | 13th Beach Golf Links, Victoria | (England) Melissa Reid (n/a) | 16 | 500,000 | LET | |
| Feb 16–19 | ISPS Handa Women's Australian Open | Royal Adelaide Golf Club, South Australia | (South Korea) Jang Ha-na (n/a) | 34 | US$1,300,000 | LPGA | |
| Feb 21–22 | Brisbane Invitational | McLeod Country Golf Club, Queensland | (Australia) Ellen Davies-Graham (1) | – | 30,000 | | |
| Feb 24 | BWAC Regional Employment Services Pro Am | Yamba Golf and Country Club, NSW | (Australia) Sarah Kemp (10) | – | 20,000 | | |

== 2018 Schedule and results ==
| Dates | Tournament | Location | Winner | WWGR points | Purse ($) | Other tours | Notes |
|---|---|---|---|---|---|---|---|
| Sep 13–15, 2017 | PTT Thailand LPGA Masters | Panya Indra Golf Club, Bangkok, Thailand | (Thailand) Saranporn Langkulgasettrin (n/a) | 2 | 150,000 | CLPGA, ThaiLPGA | |
| Sep 21–22, 2017 | Anita Boon Pro Am | North Shore Golf Club, Auckland, New Zealand | (Australia) Sarah Kemp (11) | – | 30,000 | | |
| Sep 28 – Oct 1, 2017 | McKayson New Zealand Women's Open | Windross Farm GC, Auckland, New Zealand | (Canada) Brooke Henderson (n/a) | 19 | US$1,300,000 | LPGA | |
| Dec 1–3, 2017 | The Queens | Miyoshi Country Club, Aichi, Japan | LPGA of Japan | – | €750,000 | JLPGA, KLPGA, LET | Unofficial team event |
| Jan 28 | ALPG Ballarat Icons Pro Am | Ballarat Golf Club, Ballarat, Victoria | (China) Lin Xiyu (n/a) | – | 25,000 | | |
| Feb 1–4 | Oates Vic Open | 13th Beach Golf Links, Victoria | (Australia) Minjee Lee (n/a) | 15 | 650,000 | LET | |
| Feb 9–11 | ActewAGL Canberra Classic | Royal Canberra Golf Club, ACT | (South Korea) Jiyai Shin (n/a) | 16.5 | 150,000 | LET | |
| Feb 15–18 | ISPS Handa Women's Australian Open | Kooyonga Golf Club, South Australia | (South Korea) Ko Jin-young (n/a) | 34 | US$1,300,000 | LPGA | |
| Feb 22–25 | Australian Ladies Classic | Bonville Golf Resort, NSW | (France) Céline Boutier (n/a) | 8 | 350,000 | LET | |
| Mar 1–4 | Women's NSW Open | Coffs Harbour Golf Club, NSW | (England) Meghan MacLaren (n/a) | 6 | 150,000 | LET | |
| Mar 6 | BWAC Regional Employment Services Pro Am | Yamba Golf and Country Club, NSW | (Canada) Kyla Inaba (1) | – | 20,000 | | |
| Mar 8–9 | Seasons Aged Care Brisbane Invitational | McLeod Country Golf Club, Queensland | (England) Felicity Johnson (2) | – | 30,000 | | |
| Mar 12–13 | Qantas Golf Club Gold Coast Challenge | Links Hope Island, Queensland | (Australia) Breanna Gill (1) | – | 30,000 | | |
| May 23–24 | Sheraton Deva New Caledonia Women's International Pro-Am | Sheraton Deva Resort and Spa, New Caledonia | (Australia) Breanna Gill (2) | – | 40,000 | | |

== 2019 Schedule and results ==
| Dates | Tournament | Location | Winner | WWGR points | Purse ($) | Other tours |
|---|---|---|---|---|---|---|
| Sep 19–21, 2018 | PTT Thailand LPGA Masters | Panya Indra Golf Club, Bangkok, Thailand | (Thailand) Parinda Phokan (n/a) | 4 | 150,000 | CLPGA , ThaiLPGA |
| Oct 14–15, 2018 | NZPWG Women's Pro Am in Memory of Anita Boon | Remuera Golf Club, Auckland, New Zealand | (New Zealand) Hanee Song (1) | – | 36,500 | |
| Jan 4 | Blitzgolf Curlewis | Curlewis Golf Club, Victoria | (Australia) Montana Strauss (1) | – | 20,000 | |
| Feb 2–3 | Ballarat Icons ALPG Pro Am | Ballarat Golf Club, Victoria | (Norway) Marianne Skarpnord (2) | – | 30,000 | |
| Feb 7–10 | ISPS Handa Vic Open | 13th Beach Golf Links, Victoria | (France) Céline Boutier (n/a) | 20.5 | US$1,100,000 | LPGA |
| Feb 14–17 | ISPS Handa Women's Australian Open | The Grange Golf Club, South Australia | (United States) Nelly Korda (n/a) | 37 | US$1,300,000 | LPGA |
| Feb 21–24 | Australian Ladies Classic Bonville | Bonville Golf Resort, NSW | (Norway) Marianne Skarpnord (n/a) | 10 | 350,000 | LET |
| Mar 1–3 | ActewAGL Canberra Classic | Royal Canberra Golf Club, ACT | (Netherlands) Anne van Dam (n/a) | 10 | 150,000 | LET |
| Mar 5 | Aoyuan International Moss Vale Pro Am | Moss Vale Golf Club, NSW | (Australia) Sarah Kemp (12) (tie) (Australia) Tahnia Ravnjak (1) | – | 20,000 | |
| Mar 7–10 | NSW Women's Open | Queanbeyan Golf Club, NSW | (England) Meghan MacLaren (n/a) | 6 | 150,000 | LET |
| Mar 14–15 | Sheraton Deva New Caledonia Womens International Pro Am | Sheraton Deva Resort and Spa, New Caledonia | (United States) Brooke Baker (1) | – | 40,000 | |
| Mar 18–19 | Aveo Brisbane Invitational | McLeod Country Golf Club, Queensland | (Australia) Whitney Hillier (1) | – | 30,000 | |
| Mar 22 | Findex Yamba ALPG Pro Am | Yamba Golf and Country Club, NSW | (Australia) Tahnia Ravnjak (2) | – | 20,000 | |

== 2020 Schedule and results ==
| Dates | Tournament | Location | Winner | WWGR points | Purse ($) | Other tours |
|---|---|---|---|---|---|---|
| Sep 4–6, 2019 | Trust Golf Thailand LPGA Masters | Panya Indra Golf Club, Bangkok, Thailand | (China) Zhang Weiwei (n/a) | 4 | 175,000 | CLPGA, ThaiLPGA |
| Oct 13–14, 2019 | NZPWG Women's Pro Am in Memory of Anita Boon | Remuera Golf Club, Auckland, New Zealand | (Australia) Breanna Gill (3) | – | 36,500 | |
| Jan 22 | Windaroo Lakes ALPG Pro-Am | Windaroo Lakes Golf Club, Queensland | (Germany) Laura Fuenfstueck (n/a) | – | 20,000 | |
| Jan 24 | Findex Yamba Pro-Am | Yamba Golf and Country Club, NSW | (England) Holly Clyburn (2) | – | 20,000 | |
| Jan 28–29 | Aoyuan International Moss Vale Pro-Am | Moss Vale Golf Club, NSW | (Belgium) Manon De Roey (1) | – | 20,000 | |
| Feb 1–2 | Ballarat Icons Pro-Am | Ballarat Golf Club, Victoria | (Philippines) Dottie Ardina (1) | – | 30,000 | |
| Feb 6–9 | ISPS Handa Vic Open | 13th Beach Golf Links, Victoria | (South Korea) Park Hee-young (n/a) | 20.5 | US$1,100,000 | LPGA |
| Feb 13–16 | ISPS Handa Women's Australian Open | Royal Adelaide Golf Club, South Australia | (South Korea) Inbee Park (n/a) | 37 | US$1,300,000 | LPGA |
| Feb 20–23 | Australian Ladies Classic Bonville | Bonville Golf Resort, NSW | (Australia) Stephanie Kyriacou (a, n/a) | 10 | €240,000 | LET |
| Feb 27 – Mar 1 | Women's NSW Open | Dubbo Golf Club, NSW | (Sweden) Julia Engström (n/a) | 6 | €210,000 | LET |

== 2021 Schedule and results ==
| Dates | Tournament | Location | Winner | WWGR points | Purse ($) | Other tours | Notes |
|---|---|---|---|---|---|---|---|
| Jan 28–31 | TPS Victoria | Rosebud Golf Club, Victoria | (Australia) Su-Hyun Oh (n/a) (Note: Low woman. In mixed events, the low woman is credited with first-place points for World Ranking, as it is based among the women only) | 3 | 150,000 | ANZ | Mixed event |
| Feb 20–21 | The Athena | Coolangatta & Tweed Heads Golf Club, NSW | (Australia) Kristalle Blum (n/a) | – | 50,000 | | Unofficial money event |
| Mar 4–7 | TPS Sydney | Bonnie Doon Golf Club, NSW | (Australia) Grace Kim (a, n/a) | 3 | 150,000 | ANZ | Mixed event |

== 2022 Schedule and results ==
| Dates | Tournament | Location | Winner | WWGR points | Purse ($) | Other tours | Notes |
|---|---|---|---|---|---|---|---|
| Jan 13–16 | Australian WPGA Championship | Royal Queensland Golf Club, Queensland | (Australia) Su-Hyun Oh (n/a) | 4 | 300,000 | | Unofficial money event |
| Jan 24–25 | WPGA Melbourne International | Latrobe Golf Club, Victoria | (Australia) Karis Davidson (n/a) | – | 50,000 | | |
| Feb 3–6 | TPS Victoria | Rosebud Golf Club, Victoria | (Wales) Lydia Hall (n/a) | 4 | 200,000 | ANZ | Mixed event |
| Feb 10–13 | Vic Open | 13th Beach Golf Links, Victoria | (Australia) Hannah Green (3) | 5 | 410,000 | | Played alongside Victorian Open |
| Feb 17–20 | TPS Murray River | Barooga, NSW | (Australia) Hannah Green (4) | 4 | 200,000 | ANZ | Mixed event |
| Feb 26–27 | The Athena | Sandringham Links Golf Club, Victoria | (Australia) Kirsten Rudgeley (a, n/a) | – | 50,000 | | Unofficial money event |
| Mar 3–6 | TPS Sydney | Bonnie Doon Golf Club, NSW | (Australia) Grace Kim (n/a) | 4 | 200,000 | ANZ | Mixed event |
| Mar 10–13 | TPS Hunter Valley | Oaks Cypress Lakes Resort, NSW | (New Zealand) Momoka Kobori (n/a) | 4 | 200,000 | ANZ | Mixed event |
| Apr 21–24 | Australian Ladies Classic – Bonville | Bonville Golf Resort, NSW | (England) Meghan MacLaren (n/a) | 5 | €240,000 | LET | |
| Apr 28 – May 1 | Women's NSW Open | Coolangatta & Tweed Heads Golf Club, NSW | (Sweden) Maja Stark (n/a) | 5 | €210,000 | LET | |
| Dec 1–4 | ISPS Handa Women's Australian Open | Victoria Golf Club & Kingston Heath Golf Club, Melbourne | (South Africa) Ashleigh Buhai (n/a) | 16.5 | 1,700,000 | | Played alongside Australian Open |

== 2023 Schedule and results ==
| Dates | Tournament | Location | Winner | WWGR points | Purse ($) | Other tours | Notes |
|---|---|---|---|---|---|---|---|
| Jan 20–22 | WPGA Melbourne International | Latrobe Golf Club, Victoria | (Australia) Cassie Porter (1) | – | 50,000 | | |
| Jan 26–29 | Webex Players Series Victoria | Rosebud Country Club, Victoria | (South Korea) Yoon Min-a (1) | 4 | 250,000 | ANZ | Mixed event |
| Feb 2–5 | Webex Players Series Murray River | Cobram Barooga Golf Club, Victoria | (Australia) Sarah Jane Smith (1) | 4 | 250,000 | ANZ | Mixed event |
| Feb 9–12 | Vic Open | 13th Beach Golf Links, Victoria | (South Korea) Jiyai Shin (n/a) | 4 | 420,000 | | Played alongside Victorian Open |
| Feb 16–19 | Webex Players Series Sydney | Bonnie Doon Golf Club, NSW | (Australia) Sarah Kemp (n/a) | 4 | 250,000 | ANZ | Mixed event |
| Feb 23–26 | Webex Players Series Hunter Valley | Oaks Cypress Lakes Resort, NSW | (Japan) Yuna Takagi (n/a) | 4 | 250,000 | ANZ | Mixed event |
| Mar 4–5 | The Athena | Sandringham Links Golf Club, Victoria | (Australia) Grace Lennon (1) | – | 50,000 | | Unofficial money event |
| Mar 7 | Moss Vale Women's Classic Pro-Am | Moss Vale Golf Club, NSW | (Australia) Karen Pearce (5) | – | 20,000 | | |
| Mar 9–10 | Navigate Advisors Wagga Wagga Women's Pro-Am | Wagga Wagga Country Club, NSW | (Australia) Jordan O'Brien (1) | – | 50,000 | | |
| ~~Mar 13~~ | Southport WPGA Tour Pro-Am | Southport Golf Club, Queensland | Cancelled | – | | | |
| Mar 24–26 | Women's NSW Open | Tuncurry Golf Club, NSW | (New Zealand) Momoka Kobori (2) | – | 150,000 | | |
| Mar 31–Apr 2 | Australian Women's Classic | Bonville Golf Resort, Queensland | (Australia) Breanna Gill (1) | 4 | 150,000 | | |
| May 11–14 | Thailand Mixed Cup #1 | St.Andrews 2000 Golf Course, Rayong, Thailand | (Thailand) Aunchisa Utama (n/a) | – | 150,000 | TGT | Mixed event |
| May 16–19 | Thailand Mixed Stableford Challenge #2 | St.Andrews 2000 Golf Course, Rayong, Thailand | (Thailand) Peerada Piddon (n/a) | – | 150,000 | TGT | Mixed event |
| Jun 15–18 | Thailand Mixed Cup #3 | Gassan Khuntan Golf & Resort, Thailand | (Thailand) Charng-Tai Sudsom (n/a) | – | 150,000 | TGT | Mixed event |
| Jun 21–24 | Thailand Mixed Stableford Challenge #4 | Gassan Khuntan Golf & Resort, Thailand | (Thailand) Suteepat Prateepteinchai (n/a) | – | 150,000 | TGT | Mixed event |
| Sep 21–24 | Thailand Mixed Final #5 | Lakeview Golf and Country Club, Thailand | (Thailand) Newport Laparojkit (n/a) | – | 220,000 | TGT | Mixed event |
| Oct 16–22 | Webex Players Series South Australia | Willunga, South Australia | (Australia) Robyn Choi (n/a) | 4 | 200,000 | ANZ | Mixed event |
| Nov 30 – Dec 3 | ISPS Handa Women's Australian Open | The Australian Golf Club & The Lakes Golf Club | (South Africa) Ashleigh Buhai | 17 | 1,700,000 | | Played alongside Australian Open |

== 2024 Schedule and results ==
| Dates | Tournament | Location | Winner(s) | WWGR points | Purse ($) | Other tours | Notes |
|---|---|---|---|---|---|---|---|
| Jan 13–14 | WPGA Melbourne International | Latrobe Golf Club, Victoria | (Australia) Emma Ash (n/a) | – | 50,000 | | Unofficial event (Note: Flooding made course unplayable, tournament replaced by a skills challenge.) |
| Jan 18–21 | Webex Players Series Murray River | Cobram Barooga Golf Club, Victoria | (Singapore) Shannon Tan (n/a) | 4 | 250,000 | ANZ | Mixed event |
| Jan 25–28 | Webex Players Series Victoria | Rosebud Country Club, Victoria | (Malaysia) Ashley Lau (n/a) | 4 | 250,000 | ANZ | Mixed event |
| Feb 1–4 | Vic Open | 13th Beach Golf Links, Victoria | (Malaysia) Ashley Lau (1) | 5 | 420,000 | | Played alongside Victorian Open |
| Feb 8–11 | Webex Players Series Sydney | Pagewood Golf Club, NSW | (South Korea) Jenny Shin (n/a) | 4 | 250,000 | ANZ | Mixed event |
| Feb 15–18 | Webex Players Series Hunter Valley | Oaks Cypress Lakes Resort, NSW | (Australia) Justice Bosio (a, n/a) (Japan) Kotono Fukaya (n/a) | 4 (Note: Bosio and Fukaya tied for low woman and were allocated 3.2 ranking points each.) | 250,000 | ANZ | Mixed event |
| Feb 24–25 | The Athena | Peninsula Kingswood GC, Victoria | (Australia) Kelsey Bennett (1) | – | 50,000 | | Unofficial money event |
| Feb 29–Mar 1 | Navigate Advisors Wagga Wagga Women's Pro-Am | Wagga Wagga Country Club, NSW | (South Korea) Cho Jeong-min (1) | – | 50,000 | | |
| Mar 29–31 | Women's NSW Open | Magenta Shores Golf Club, NSW | (Colombia) Mariajo Uribe (n/a) | 12 | €300,000 | LET | |
| Apr 5–7 | Australian Women's Classic | Bonville Golf Resort, Queensland | (Denmark) Nicole Broch Estrup (n/a) (Chinese Taipei) Tsai Pei-ying (n/a) (Australia) Jess Whitting (n/a) | – | €300,000 | LET | Unofficial event (Note: Tournament terminated after 18 holes due to heavy rain. As a result, title shared and classed as unofficial with no Women's World Golf Ranking points awarded.) |
| Apr 10–11 | World Sand Greens Championship | Walcha Golf Club, NSW | (Wales) Lydia Hall (2) | – | 140,000 | | |
| Oct 24–27 | Webex Players Series South Australia | Willunga, South Australia | (Australia) Kathryn Norris (n/a) | 4 | 200,000 | ANZ | Mixed event |
| Nov 28 – Dec 1 | ISPS Handa Women's Australian Open | Kingston Heath & Victoria Golf Club | (South Korea) Jiyai Shin (n/a) | 16 | 1,700,000 | | Played alongside Australian Open |

== 2025 Schedule and results ==
| Dates | Tournament | Location | Winner | WWGR points | Purse ($) | Other tours | Notes |
|---|---|---|---|---|---|---|---|
| Jan 9–12 | Webex Players Series Perth | Royal Fremantle Golf Club, WA | (Australia) Kirsten Rudgeley (n/a) | 4 | 250,000 | ANZ | Mixed event |
| Jan 15–16 | WPGA Melbourne International | Latrobe Golf Club, Victoria | (Australia) Abbie Teasdale (1) | – | 30,000 | | |
| Jan 23–26 | Webex Players Series Victoria | Rosebud Country Club, Victoria | (Malaysia) Ashley Lau (n/a) | 4 | 250,000 | ANZ | Mixed event |
| Jan 30–Feb 2 | Webex Players Series Murray River | Cobram Barooga Golf Club, NSW | (Thailand) Cholcheva Wongras (n/a) | 4 | 250,000 | ANZ | Mixed event |
| Feb 6–9 | Vic Open | 13th Beach Golf Links, Victoria | (Australia) Su-Hyun Oh (3) | 5 | 200,000 | | |
| Feb 20–23 | Webex Players Series Sydney | Castle Hill Country Club, NSW | (Australia) Cassie Porter (n/a) | 4 | 250,000 | ANZ | Mixed event |
| Mar 1–2 | The Athena | Peninsula Kingswood GC, Victoria | (New Zealand) Claire Shin (1) | – | 50,000 | | Unofficial money event |
| ~~Mar 6–9~~ | Australian WPGA Championship | Sanctuary Cove G&CC, Queensland | Cancelled due to Cylcone Alfred | | 600,000 | LET | |
| Mar 13–16 | Australian Women's Classic | Coffs Harbour Golf Club, NSW | (Belgium) Manon De Roey (2) | 14 | 500,000 | LET | |
| Mar 20–23 | Women's NSW Open | Wollongong Golf Club, NSW | (England) Mimi Rhodes (1) | 12 | 500,000 | LET | |
| Mar 27–29 | World Sand Greens Championship | Binalong Golf Club, NSW | (South Korea) Yoon Min-a (2) | 4 | 175,000 | | |
| Apr 3–4 | Navigate Advisors Wagga Wagga Pro-Am | Wagga Wagga Country Club, NSW | (Thailand) Cholcheva Wongras (n/a) | – | 50,000 | | |
| Oct 23–26 | Webex Players Series South Australia | Willunga Golf Club, SA | (Australia) Justice Bosio (n/a) | 4 | 250,000 | ANZ | Mixed event |

== 2026 Schedule and results ==
| Dates | Tournament | Location | Winner | WWGR points | Purse ($) | Other tours | Notes |
|---|---|---|---|---|---|---|---|
| Jan 8–11 | Webex Players Series Perth | Royal Fremantle Golf Club, WA | (Australia) Kirsten Rudgeley (n/a) (Australia) Abbie Teasdale (n/a) | 2.00 | 250,000 | ANZ | Mixed event |
| Jan 15–18 | Vic Open | 13th Beach Golf Links, Victoria | (Wales) Lydia Hall (3) | 3.30 | 200,000 | | |
| Jan 22–25 | Webex Players Series Victoria | Rosebud Country Club, Victoria | (Australia) Amelia Mehmet-Grohn (n/a) (Australia) Jazy Roberts (n/a) | 2.30 | 250,000 | ANZ | Mixed event |
| Jan 29 – Feb 1 | Webex Players Series Murray River | Cobram Barooga Golf Club, NSW | (Wales) Lydia Hall (n/a) | 1.90 | 250,000 | ANZ | Mixed event |
| Febr 5–8 | Webex Players Series Sydney | Castle Hill Country Club, NSW | (Australia) Stephanie Kyriacou (n/a) | 3.00 | 250,000 | ANZ | Mixed event |
| Feb 26 – Mar 1 | Ford Women's NSW Open | Wollongong Golf Club, NSW | (France) Agathe Laisné | 9.00 | 600,000 | LET | |
| Mar 5–8 | Australian Women's Classic | Magenta Shores G&CC, NSW | (Australia) Kelsey Bennett (2) | 12.40 | 600,000 | LET | |
| Mar 12–15 | Women's Australian Open | Kooyonga Golf Club, Adelaide, SA | (Australia) Hannah Green (5) | 18.67 | 1,700,000 | LET | |
| Mar 19–22 | Australian WPGA Championship | Sanctuary Cove G&CC, Queensland | (Australia) Hannah Green (6) | 16.30 | 600,000 | LET | |
| Mar 26–27 | Sunnyside Estate Wagga Wagga CC Pro-Am | Wagga Wagga Country Club, NSW | (Australia) Steffanie Vogel (n/a) | – | 50,000 | | |
| Mar 28–30 | World Sand Greens Championship | Holbrook Golf Club, NSW | (Malaysia) Liyana Azizan Durisic (n/a) | – | 125,000 | | |
| Oct 23–25 | Players Series SA | Willunga Golf Course, SA | (Australia) Jazy Roberts (n/a) | 1.60 | 200,000 | ANZ | Mixed event |

== 2027 Schedule and results ==
| Dates | Tournament | Location | Winner | WWGR points | Purse ($) | Other tours | Notes |
|---|---|---|---|---|---|---|---|
| Jan 8–10 | Players Series Perth | Royal Fremantle Golf Club, WA | | | 250,000 | ANZ | Mixed event |
| Jan 15–17 | Players Series Victoria | Peninsula Kingswood Country GC | | | 250,000 | ANZ | Mixed event |
| Jan 22–24 | Vic Open | 13th Beach Golf Links, Victoria | | | 200,000 | | |
| Jan 29–31 | Players Series Murray River | Cobram Barooga GC, NSW | | | 250,000 | ANZ | Mixed event |
| Feb 5–7 | Players Series Sydney | Castle Hill Country Club, NSW | | | 250,000 | ANZ | Mixed event |
| Mar 5–7 | Australian WPGA Championship | Sanctuary Cove G&CC, Queensland | | | | | |
| Mar 11–14 | Women's Australian Open | Royal Adelaide Golf Club, SA | | | 1,700,000 | LET | |
| Mar 19–21 | New Zealand Women's Open | Wainui Golf Course, Auckland | | | NZ$800,000 | LET | Last played 2017 |

== Order of Merit winners ==
The Order of Merit is awarded to the leading money winner on the tour, though since 2024 a points system is used.

| Year | Winner |
|---|---|
| 2017 | (Australia) Sarah Jane Smith |
| 2018 | (Australia) Minjee Lee |
| 2019 | (Australia) Sarah Kemp |
| 2020 | (Australia) Minjee Lee |
| 2021 | (Australia) Su Oh |
| 2022 | (Australia) Hannah Green |
| 2023 | (Australia) Minjee Lee |
| 2024 | (South Korea) Jiyai Shin |
| 2025 | (Thailand) Cholcheva Wongras |
| 2026 | (Australia) Hannah Green |

== See also ==
- Women's World Golf Rankings
