= Kirsten Rudgeley =

Australian golfer (born 2001)

Personal information
- Nationality: Australia
- Born: 2001 (age 24–25) London, England
- Height: 5 ft 5 in (165 cm)

Career
- Sport: Golf
- Turned professional: 2022
- Current tours: LET (joined 2023); WPGA Tour of Australasia
- Professional wins: 1

Number of wins by tour
- WPGA Tour of Australasia: 1

Best results in LPGA major championships
- Chevron Championship: DNP
- Women's PGA C'ship: DNP
- U.S. Women's Open: DNP
- Women's British Open: CUT: 2021, 2025
- Evian Championship: DNP

Achievements and awards
- Golf Australia Women’s Order of Merit: 2021
- Karrie Webb Scholarship: 2021, 2022

Kirsten Rudgeley (born 2001) is an Australian professional golfer who plays on the Ladies European Tour. She was runner-up at the 2024 Lacoste Ladies Open de France and the 2025 Women's NSW Open. In 2022, she won The Athena Golf Challenge on the WPGA Tour of Australasia.

== Early life and amateur career ==
Rudgeley was born in London, England and relocated with her family to Perth, Western Australia when she was four. Her father introduced her to golf when she was 7 years old, but she didn't consider herself a serious golfer until she represented Western Australia at age 14.

Domestically, Rudgeley was runner-up at the 2020 Riversdale Cup and won the Port Phillip Open Amateur, Victorian Amateur, North Shore Classic and the Rene Erichsen Salver, plus the Western Australia Amateur three times.

In 2021, she won the Helen Holm Scottish Women's Open Championship and the English Women's Amateur Championship, before qualifying for the 2021 Women's British Open at Carnoustie Golf Links in Scotland, her first major. She was also runner-up at the Australian Women's Amateur and finished second behind Su Oh at the TPS Victoria, a WPGA Tour of Australasia event. She finished in a tie for seventh at the Women's Victorian Open, a Ladies European Tour event, and received the Golf Australia Women's Order of Merit award for 2021.

Rudgeley beat Grace Kim in the final to win The Athena Golf Challenge amongst a field of professionals on the 2022 WPGA Tour of Australasia.

She was Australia's sole representative at the 2022 Augusta National Women's Amateur, where she finished 8th. She received the Karrie Webb Scholarship for the second straight year, as Australia's leading female amateur.

She recorded a career high of 24th in the World Amateur Golf Rankings.

== Professional career ==
Rudgeley turned professional after earning her Ladies European Tour card for 2023 by finishing T9 at Q-School.

In her rookie season, she was runner-up at the 2024 Lacoste Ladies Open de France after she lost a playoff to Chiara Tamburlini.

In 2025, she was runner-up at the Women's NSW Open, 2 strokes behind Mimi Rhodes.

== Amateur wins ==
- 2017 Western Australia Amateur
- 2019 Western Australia Amateur
- 2020 Western Australia Amateur, Port Phillip Open Amateur and Victorian Women's Amateur Championship
- 2021 Rene Erichsen Salver, North Shore Classic, Helen Holm Scottish Women's Open Championship, English Women's Amateur Championship
- 2022 Avondale Amateur

== Professional wins (1) ==
=== WPGA Tour of Australasia wins (1) ===
No.	Date	Tournament	Winning score	To par	Margin of victory	Runner-up
1	27 Feb 2022	The Athena (as an amateur)	Playoff			(Australia) Grace Kim

== Playoff record ==
Ladies European Tour playoff record (0–2)

No.	Year	Tournament	Opponent(s)	Result
1	2024	Lacoste Ladies Open de France	(Switzerland) Chiara Tamburlini	Lost to birdie on first extra hole
2	2026	Joburg Ladies Open	(France) Agathe Laisné (South Africa) Casandra Alexander	Lost to birdie on fifth extra hole. Alexander eliminated by birdie on first extra hole.

== Team appearances ==
Amateur

- Australian Girls' Interstate Teams Matches (representing Western Australia): 2017, 2018
- Australian Women's Interstate Teams Matches (representing Western Australia): 2017, 2018, 2019, 2022
- Junior Golf World Cup (representing Australia): 2019
- Espirito Santo Trophy (representing Australia): 2022
- Queen Sirikit Cup (representing Australia): 2022
