= Cassie Porter =

Australian professional golfer

Personal information
- Nationality: Australia
- Born: 14 September 2002 (age 24) Sydney, New South Wales, Australia
- Height: 5 ft 10 in (178 cm)

Career
- Sport: Golf
- Turned professional: 2021
- Current tours: WPGA Tour of Australasia (joined 2022); LPGA Tour (joined 2025)
- Former tour: Epson Tour (joined 2023)
- Professional wins: 2

Number of wins by tour
- WPGA Tour of Australasia: 1
- Epson Tour: 1

Best results in LPGA major championships
- Chevron Championship: T34: 2026
- Women's PGA C'ship: CUT: 2025, 2026
- U.S. Women's Open: DNP
- Women's British Open: CUT: 2025, 2026
- Evian Championship: T26: 2026

Cassie Porter (born 14 September 2002) is an Australian professional golfer who plays on the WPGA Tour of Australasia and the LPGA Tour. She won the 2024 FireKeepers Casino Hotel Championship.

== Early life and amateur career ==
Porter was born in Sydney in New South Wales and grew up in the Sunshine Coast, Queensland. She had a successful amateur career and won the Northern Territory Women's Amateur twice. In 2020, she was runner-up at the Australian Master of the Amateurs following a playoff, and in 2021 she won the Keperra Bowl and finished 10th at the Women's Amateur Asia-Pacific. She represented Australia internationally at the Junior Golf World Cup in Japan and the Spirit International Amateur Golf Championship in Texas.

== Professional career ==
Porter turned professional in 2021 and joined the WPGA Tour of Australasia in 2022. In her rookie season, she finished second lowest female at the TPS Hunter Valley and TPS Sydney, and tied for 4th at the Women's NSW Open, a Ladies European Tour co-sanctioned event. She secured her maiden professional title at the WPGA Melbourne International in 2023, beating her friend Kelsey Bennett on the fourth hole of a playoff, with Momoka Kobori and Karis Davidson a stroke behind in tied third.

Porter joined the Epson Tour in 2023, where her best finish in her rookie season was a tie for 4th at the Champions Fore Change Invitational. In 2024, she finished 3rd at the Florida's Natural Charity Classic before winning her maiden Epson Tour victory at the FireKeepers Casino Hotel Championship in Battle Creek, Michigan.

== Amateur wins ==
- 2016 The Invincibles IGA Sunshine Junior Masters Championship
- 2017 Katherine Kirk Classic, The Invincibles IGA Sunshine Junior Masters Championship
- 2018 Northern Territory Women's Amateur
- 2019 Northern Territory Women's Amateur, Junior Golf World Cup (individual), Jack Newton International Junior Classic, Greg Norman Junior Masters, Victorian Junior Open
- 2021 Keperra Bowl

== Professional wins (2) ==
=== Epson Tour (1) ===
No.	Date	Tournament	Winning score	To par	Margin of victory	Runners-up
1	9 Jun 2024	FireKeepers Casino Hotel Championship	73-68-69=210	−6	1 stroke	(New Zealand) Amelia Garvey (Chinese Taipei) Hung Jo-Hua (United States) Brooke Matthews (England) Anita Uwadia

=== WPGA Tour of Australasia wins (1) ===
No.	Date	Tournament	Winning score	To par	Margin of victory	Runner-up
1	22 Jan 2023	WPGA Melbourne International	70-70=140	−4	Playoff	(Australia) Kelsey Bennett

WPGA Tour of Australasia playoff record (1–0)

No.	Year	Tournament	Opponent	Result
1	2023	WPGA Melbourne International	(Australia) Kelsey Bennett	Won with par on fourth extra hole

== Results in LPGA majors ==
Tournament	2025	2026
Chevron Championship	T40	T34
U.S. Women's Open		
Women's PGA Championship	CUT	CUT
The Evian Championship	CUT	T26
Women's British Open	CUT	CUT

Did not play

CUT = missed the half-way cut
T = tied

== Team appearances ==
Amateur

- Australian Girl's Interstate Teams Matches (representing Queensland): 2017, 2018, 2019
- Australian Women's Interstate Teams Matches (representing Queensland): 2018, 2019
- Junior Golf World Cup (representing Australia): 2019
- Spirit International (representing Australia): 2019
