= Lydia Hall =

Welsh golfer (born 1987)

Personal information
- Full name: Lydia Gail Hall
- Nationality: Wales
- Born: 14 December 1987 (age 38) Bridgend, Wales
- Height: 1.57 m (5 ft 2 in)

Career
- Sport: Golf
- Turned professional: 2007
- Current tour: Ladies European Tour (joined 2008)
- Professional wins: 5

Number of wins by tour
- Ladies European Tour: 1
- WPGA Tour of Australasia: 2
- Other: 2

Best results in LPGA major championships
- Chevron Championship: DNP
- Women's PGA C'ship: DNP
- U.S. Women's Open: CUT: 2022
- Women's British Open: T57: 2018
- Evian Championship: DNP

Lydia Gail Hall (born 14 December 1987) is a Welsh professional golfer and Ladies European Tour player. She won the 2012 ISPS Handa Ladies British Masters and the 2016 Welsh National PGA Championship, the first woman to win a PGA national tournament.

== Early life, family, and amateur career ==
Hall is the daughter of Wayne Hall, a rugby union player, who played one match for Wales in 1988. She started to play golf at the age of 11 and was on the Welsh National team between 2001 and 2007, and helped win the silver medal at the 2004 European Lady Junior's Team Championship at Royal Cinque Ports Golf Club.

== Professional career ==
Hall turned professional in November 2007 and joined the 2008 Ladies European Tour. She represented Wales at the 2009 European Nations Cup with Becky Brewerton.

In 2012, she won the ISPS Handa Ladies British Masters at Buckinghamshire Golf Club, and finished 16th in the season rankings. In 2016, she was runner-up at the Qatar Ladies Open and won the Welsh National PGA Championship, the first woman to win a PGA national tournament.

In 2017, she also played in two LET Access Series events and won the WPGA International Challenge in Stoke-by-Nayland. Defending her title in 2018, she lost a playoff to Manon De Roey.

Hall tied for 3rd at the 2021 Aramco Team Series - Jeddah, where she captained a team with Becky Brewerton and Luiza Altmann that lost a playoff to Emily Kristine Pedersen's team, who scored an eagle on the second playoff hole to secure their victory.

She was runner-up at the 2023 Dutch Ladies Open, a stroke behind Trichat Cheenglab.

== Professional wins (5) ==
=== Ladies European Tour (1) ===
No.	Date	Tournament	Winning score	To par	Margin of victory	Runner-up
1	2012	ISPS Handa Ladies British Masters	66-71-72=209	−7	1 stroke	(United States) Beth Allen

=== WPGA Tour of Australasia wins (2) ===
No.	Date	Tournament	Winning score	To par	Margin of victory	Runner(s)-up	Ref
1	2024	World Sand Greens Championship	72-68=140	−2	1 stroke	(Thailand) Cholcheva Wongras	
2	2026	Vic Open	70-75-72-72=289	Par	4 strokes	(Australia) Kelsey Bennett (Australia) Kathryn Norris	

=== LET Access Series wins (1) ===
No.	Date	Tournament	Winning score	To par	Margin of victory	Runner-up	Ref
1	2017	WPGA International Challenge	65-72-70=207	−9	Playoff	(France) Inès Lescudier	

=== Other wins (1) ===
- 2016 Welsh National PGA Championship

== Team appearances ==
Amateur

- European Girls' Team Championship (representing Wales): 2003
- Women's Home Internationals (representing Wales): 2004, 2005, 2007
- European Lady Junior's Team Championship (representing Wales): 2004, 2006
- European Ladies' Team Championship (representing Wales): 2005, 2007

Professional

- European Nations Cup (representing Wales): 2009
