= Australian WPGA Championship =

Women's professional golf tournament

Coordinates: 27.857°S 153.375°E

Tournament information
- Location: Sanctuary Cove, Queensland, Australia
- Established: 2022
- Courses: Sanctuary Cove Golf & Country Club
- Par: 72
- Tours: WPGA Tour of Australasia; Ladies European Tour
- Format: Stroke play
- Prize fund: A$600,000
- Month played: March

Current champion
- (Australia) Hannah Green

Location map
- Location in Australia Location in Queensland

The Australian WPGA Championship is a women's professional golf tournament on the WPGA Tour of Australasia held in Queensland, Australia.

First held at Royal Queensland Golf Club in 2022, it later moved to Sanctuary Cove Golf & Country Club. Players compete to lift the Karrie Webb Cup.

Beginning in 2025, the tournament is co-sanctioned by the Ladies European Tour, as part of its Australian swing alongside the Women's NSW Open and Australian Women's Classic.

== Winners ==
Year	Tour(s) (Note: LET − Ladies European Tour; WPGA − WPGA Tour of Australasia.)	Winner	Score	Margin of victory	Runner(s)-up	Purse ($)	Venue
2026	WPGA · LET	(Australia) Hannah Green	−16 (65-67-67-69=268)	4 strokes	(South Africa) Casandra Alexander (Germany) Alexandra Försterling	600,000	Sanctuary Cove
2025	WPGA · LET	Cancelled due to Cyclone Alfred				600,000	Sanctuary Cove
2023–24: No tournament
2022	WPGA	(Australia) Su-Hyun Oh	−10 (66-72-68-68=274)	4 strokes	(Australia) Grace Kim	285,000	Royal Queensland
