= ActewAGL Canberra Classic =

Coordinates: 35.304°S 149.088°E

Tournament information
- Location: Canberra, ACT, Australia
- Established: 2009
- Course: Royal Canberra Golf Club
- Par: 73
- Tours: ALPG Tour; Ladies European Tour (since 2018)
- Format: Stroke play
- Prize fund: A$150,000
- Month played: February / March

Final champion
- (Netherlands) Anne van Dam

Location in Australia

The ActewAGL Canberra Classic was a golf tournament co-sanctioned by the Australian Ladies Professional Golf Tour and the Ladies European Tour. First played in 2009 as a pro-am, it was always held at the Royal Canberra Golf Club in Canberra, ACT, Australia. It was a 54-hole tournament played over three days, with a pro-am taking place the day before.

== History ==
Sarah Kemp won the pro-am in 2009, and Kristie Smith won the inaugural title in 2010 by two strokes ahead of Katherine Hull. In 2011, Queensland amateur Ashley Ona won the title, and in 2012 Karen Lunn won, for her first major tournament victory in 22 years on home soil in Australia.

== Winners ==
Year	Tours (Note: ALPG − ALPG Tour; LET − Ladies European Tour.)	Winner	Country	Score	Margin of victory	Runner-up
ActewAGL Canberra Classic
2019	ALPG, LET	Anne van Dam	Netherlands	−17 (68-63-65=196)	3 strokes	(Slovenia) Katja Pogačar
2018	ALPG, LET	Jiyai Shin	South Korea	−19 (65-68-64=197)	6 strokes	(Australia) Minjee Lee
2013−2017: No tournament
ActewAGL Royal Canberra Ladies Classic
2012	ALPG	Karen Lunn	Australia	207 (−12)	4 strokes	(Australia) Vicky Thomas
2011	ALPG	Ashley Ona (a)	Australia	207 (−12)	1 stroke	(United States) Alison Walshe
2010	ALPG	Kristie Smith	Australia	203 (−16)	2 strokes	(Australia) Katherine Hull
ActewAGL Royal Canberra Pro-Am
2009	ALPG	Sarah Kemp	Australia	69 (−3) (Note: A pro-am played over one round)		
