= Moss Vale Ladies Classic =

Women's professional golf tournament

Coordinates: 34.557°S 150.372°E

Tournament information
- Location: Moss Vale, NSW, Australia
- Established: 2008
- Course: Moss Vale Golf Club
- Par: 73
- Tour: WPGA Tour of Australasia
- Format: Stroke play
- Month played: January
- Final year: 2023

Final champion
- (Brazil) Miriam Nagl (official event)

Location map
- Location in Australia Location in New South Wales

The Moss Vale Ladies Classic was a women's professional golf tournament on the WPGA Tour of Australasia held in Moss Vale in the Southern Highlands of New South Wales, Australia.

== Winners ==
| Year | Tour | Winner | Score | To par | Margin of victory | Runner(s)-up | Ref |
Moss Vale Women's Classic Pro-Am
| 2023 | WPGA | (Australia) Karen Pearce | 70 | −3 | 4 strokes | (Australia) Nikki Garrett | |
2021–2022: No tournament
Aoyuan International Moss Vale Pro-Am
| 2020 | ALPG | (Belgium) Manon De Roey | 70 | −3 | Playoff (Note: De Roey won with a birdie on the second playoff hole) | (Philippines) Dottie Ardina | |
| 2019 | ALPG | (Australia) Sarah Kemp (tie) (Australia) Tahnia Ravnjak | 68 | −5 | —N/a | —N/a | |
2017–2018: No tournament
Moss Vale Ladies Classic
| 2016 | ALPG | (Brazil) Miriam Nagl | 71-69=140 | −6 | Playoff (Note: Nagl won on the third playoff hole) | (Mexico) Ana Menéndez | |
| 2015 | ALPG | (South Korea) Sarah Oh | 70-64=134 | −12 | 1 stroke | (Australia) Sarah Kemp | |
| 2014 | ALPG | (Australia) Bree Arthur | 71-67=138 | −8 | 1 stroke | (England) Laura Davies (South Africa) Stacy Lee Bregman | |
2012–2013: No tournament
| 2011 | ALPG | (Australia) Katherine Hull | 65-66=131 | −10 | 2 strokes | (Australia) Stephanie Na | |
| 2010 | ALPG | (Australia) Vicky Thomas | 65-73=138 | −8 | 3 strokes | (Australia) Joanne Mills | |
| 2008 | ALPG | (New Zealand) Stacey Tate | 70-69=139 | −7 | 1 stroke | (Australia) Wendy Berger | |
