= Klatten =

Klatten is a surname. Notable people with the surname include:

- Joanna Klatten (born 1985), French golfer
- Susanne Klatten (born 1962), German billionaire heiress
