= WPGA Melbourne International =

Women's professional golf tournament

Coordinates: 37.785°S 145.0378°E

Tournament information
- Location: Melbourne, Australia
- Established: 2022
- Course: Latrobe Golf Club
- Par: 72
- Tour: WPGA Tour of Australasia
- Format: Stroke play
- Prize fund: A$30,000
- Month played: January

Current champion
- (Australia) Abbie Teasdale

Location map
- Location in Australia Location in Victoria

The WPGA Melbourne International is a women's professional golf tournament on the WPGA Tour of Australasia held in Melbourne, Australia.

== History ==
Karis Davidson won the inaugural tournament in 2022. In 2023, Cassie Porter won in a playoff against Kelsey Bennett with par on the fourth extra hole. In 2024, torrential rain in Melbourne caused flooding from the adjacent Yarra River and made the course unplayable. The tournament was replaced by a skills challenge.

== Winners ==
Year	Winner	Score	Margin of victory	Runner-up	Purse ($)
Drummond Golf Melbourne International
2025	(Australia) Abbie Teasdale	−4 (72-71=143)	Playoff	(Australia) Jordan O'Brien	30,000
WPGA Melbourne International
2024	(Australia) Emma Ash	25 (Note: Flooding made course unplayable, tournament replaced by a skills challenge.)	1.5	(Australia) Elmay Viking	50,000
2023	(Australia) Cassie Porter	−4 (70-70=140)	Playoff	(Australia) Kelsey Bennett	50,000
2022	(Australia) Karis Davidson	−7 (68-69=137)	2 strokes	(Australia) Breanna Gill	50,000
