= Brisbane Invitational =

Coordinates: 27.5509°S 152.924°E

Tournament information
- Location: Brisbane, Queensland, Australia
- Established: 2015
- Course: McLeod Country Golf Club
- Par: 74
- Tour: ALPG Tour
- Format: Stroke play
- Prize fund: A$30,000
- Month played: March
- Final year: 2019

Final champion
- (Australia) Whitney Hillier

Location map
- Location in Australia Location in Queensland

The Brisbane Invitational was an annual women's golf tournament held at McLeod Country Golf Club in Brisbane, Australia. It was part of the ALPG Tour between 2015 and 2019.

When the tournament started in 2015 it was the first professional women's golf tournament held in Brisbane for over 35 years.

In 2016, Stacey Keating needed a par at the par-3 18th hole to force a playoff with Kyla Inaba of Canada and Norwegian Tonje Daffinrud, but holed a putt from 15 meters to claim the victory outright.

== Winners ==
Year	Winner	Country	Score	Margin of victory	Runners-up	Purse (A$)	Notes
Aveo Brisbane Invitational
2019	Whitney Hillier	Australia	69 (−5)			30,000	
Seasons Aged Care Brisbane Invitational
2018	Felicity Johnson	England	72 (−2)	Playoff (Note: Song and Gill were eliminated with bogeys on the first extra hole. Johnson won with par on second extra hole.)	(Australia) Breanna Gill (Belgium) Manon De Roey (New Zealand) Hanee Song	30,000	
Brisbane Invitational
2017	Ellen Davies-Graham	Australia	68 (−6)	3 strokes	(Australia) Jessica Cowie (Australia) Whitney Hillier (Australia) Emily McLennan (Norway) Tonje Daffinrud	30,000	
2016	Stacey Keating	Australia		1 stroke	(Canada) Kyla Inaba (Norway) Tonje Daffinrud	30,000	
McLeod ALPG Pro-Am
2015	Liv Cheng; Sarah Kemp	New Zealand; Australia	70 (−4)	n/a (Note: No playoff was held, Cheng and Kemp tied for first place shared the win.)		25,000	
