= Pogačar =

Pogačar is a Slovene surname. Notable people with the surname include:

- Katja Pogačar (born 1994), Slovene golfer
- Tadej Pogačar (born 1998), Slovene cyclist
