= 2024–25 PGA Tour of Australasia =

Golf tour season

2024–25 PGA Tour of Australasia season
- Duration: 15 August 2024 – 30 March 2025
- Number of official events: 19
- Most wins: (Australia) Jack Buchanan (2) (Australia) Elvis Smylie (2)
- Order of Merit: (Australia) Elvis Smylie
- Player of the Year: (Australia) Elvis Smylie
- Rookie of the Year: (Australia) Ryan Peake

The 2024–25 PGA Tour of Australasia, titled as the 2024–25 Challenger PGA Tour of Australasia for sponsorship reasons, was the 51st season on the PGA Tour of Australasia, the main professional golf tour in Australia and New Zealand since it was formed in 1973.

== Schedule ==
The following table lists official events during the 2024–25 season.

Date	Tournament	Location	Purse (A$)	Winner (Note: The number in brackets after each winner's name is the number of PGA Tour of Australasia events they had won up to and including that tournament. This information is only shown for PGA Tour of Australasia members.)	OWGR points	Other tours (Note: ASA − Asian Tour; EUR − European Tour; WANZ − WPGA Tour of Australasia.)	Notes
18 Aug	PNG Open	Papua New Guinea	200,000	(Australia) William Bruyeres (1)	0.83		
13 Oct	CKB WA PGA Championship	Western Australia	250,000	(Australia) Jack Buchanan (1)	1.44		
20 Oct	Bowra & O'Dea Nexus Advisernet WA Open	Western Australia	175,000	(Australia) Elvis Smylie (1)	2.14		
27 Oct	Webex Players Series SA	South Australia	200,000	(Australia) Jack Buchanan (2)	1.65	WANZ	Mixed event
3 Nov	Queensland PGA Championship	Queensland	250,000	(Australia) Phoenix Campbell (2)	2.21		
17 Nov	Ford NSW Open	New South Wales	800,000	(Australia) Lucas Herbert (1)	3.17		
24 Nov	BMW Australian PGA Championship	Queensland	2,000,000	(Australia) Elvis Smylie (2)	13.03	EUR	
1 Dec	ISPS Handa Australian Open	Victoria	1,700,000	(United States) Ryggs Johnston (n/a)	13.56	EUR	
8 Dec	Victorian PGA Championship	Victoria	250,000	(Australia) Cory Crawford (2)	1.62		
15 Dec	Gippsland Super 6	Victoria	200,000	(Australia) Ben Henkel (1)	1.21		
12 Jan	Webex Players Series Perth	Western Australia	250,000	(Australia) Jordan Doull (1)	2.68	WANZ	Mixed event
26 Jan	Webex Players Series Victoria	Victoria	250,000	(Australia) Michael Wright (2)	2.89	WANZ	Mixed event
2 Feb	Webex Players Series Murray River	New South Wales	250,000	(Australia) Blake Proverbs (1)	2.82	WANZ	Mixed event
9 Feb	Vic Open	Victoria	200,000	(New Zealand) Josh Geary (2)	3.54		
23 Feb	Webex Players Series Sydney	New South Wales	250,000	(New Zealand) Nick Voke (1)	3.39	WANZ	Mixed event
2 Mar	New Zealand Open	New Zealand	NZ$2,000,000	(Australia) Ryan Peake (1)	9.73	ASA	
9 Mar	Wallace Development New Zealand PGA Championship	New Zealand	175,000	(New Zealand) Tyler Hodge (1)	3.33		
23 Mar	Heritage Classic	Victoria	225,000	(Australia) James Conran (1)	3.23		
30 Mar	The National Tournament	Victoria	200,000	(Australia) Harrison Crowe (2)	3.95		

=== Unofficial events ===
The following events were sanctioned by the PGA Tour of Australasia, but did not carry official money, nor were wins official.

Date	Tournament	Location	Purse (A$)	Winner	OWGR points	Notes
29 Sep	World Sand Greens Championship	New South Wales	140,000	(Australia) Brett Rankin	n/a	New tournament

== Order of Merit ==
The Order of Merit was based on tournament results during the season, calculated using a points-based system. The top three players on the Order of Merit (not otherwise exempt) earned status to play on the 2026 European Tour (DP World Tour).

Position	Player	Points	Status earned
1	(Australia) Elvis Smylie	1,359	Already exempt (Note: Smylie was already exempt due to being a tournament winner on the 2025 European Tour (DP World Tour).)
2	(Australia) Ryan Peake	1,013	Promoted to European Tour
3	(Australia) Lucas Herbert	758	Forfeited exemption
4	(Australia) Cameron Smith	736	Not a member (Note: Smith would have been already exempt due to his 2022 Open Championship win, however he has never taken up European Tour membership in his career.)
5	(Australia) Anthony Quayle	688	Promoted to European Tour
6	(Australia) Jack Buchanan	678	Promoted to European Tour

== Awards ==
Award	Winner	Ref.
Player of the Year	(Australia) Elvis Smylie	
Rookie of the Year	(Australia) Ryan Peake	
