= World Sand Greens Championship =

Women's professional golf tournament

Coordinates: 34.683°S 148.557°E

Tournament information
- Location: Holbrook, NSW, Australia
- Established: 2024
- Course: Holbrook Golf Club
- Par: 72
- Tours: WPGA Tour of Australasia; PGA Tour of Australasia (unofficial event)
- Format: Stroke play
- Prize fund: A$125,000
- Month played: March

Current champion
- (Malaysia) Liyana Azizan Durisic (Australia) Scott Barr

Location map
- Location in Australia Location in New South Wales

The World Sand Greens Championship is a women's professional golf tournament on the WPGA Tour of Australasia and an unofficial men's event on the PGA Tour of Australasia, held in New South Wales, Australia.

== History ==
Lydia Hall won the inaugural tournament held at Walcha Golf Club in Walcha, New South Wales in 2024. The next year, Yoon Min-a won with a final round 66 in heavy rain at Binalong Golf Club in Binalong. Cholcheva Wongras, just turned 18, was runner-up for the second year running.

== Women's winners ==
Year	Winner	Score	To par	Margin of victory	Runner-up	Venue
2026	(Malaysia) Liyana Azizan Durisic	139	−5	2 strokes	(Wales) Lydia Hall	Holbrook
2025	(South Korea) Yoon Min-a	199	−11	4 strokes	(Thailand) Cholcheva Wongras	Binalong
2024	(Wales) Lydia Hall	140	−2	1 stroke	(Thailand) Cholcheva Wongras	Walcha

== Men's winners ==
Year	Winner	Score	To par	Margin of victory	Runner-up	Venue
2026	(Australia) Scott Barr	124	−16	3 strokes	(Australia) Nathan Barbieri	Binalong
2025	(Australia) Samuel Slater	199	−11	4 strokes	(Australia) Douglas Klein	Binalong
2024	(Australia) Brett Rankin	140	−2	1 stroke	(Australia) Samuel Slater	Binalong
