= Elvis Smylie =

Australian professional golfer (born 2002)

Personal information
- Nationality: Australia
- Born: 23 April 2002 (age 24)

Career
- Sport: Golf
- Turned professional: 2021
- Current tours: LIV Golf; European Tour; PGA Tour of Australasia
- Professional wins: 3
- Highest ranking: 73 (1 March 2026) (as of 8 November 2026)

Number of wins by tour
- European Tour: 1
- PGA Tour of Australasia: 2
- LIV Golf: 1

Best results in major championships
- Masters Tournament: DNP
- PGA Championship: T72: 2025
- U.S. Open: DNP
- The Open Championship: CUT: 2024, 2025

Achievements and awards
- PGA Tour of Australasia Order of Merit winner: 2024–25
- PGA Tour of Australasia Player of the Year: 2024–25

Elvis Smylie (born 23 April 2002) is an Australian professional golfer.

== Early life ==
From Queensland, he played tennis and soccer when he was young but was most passionate about golf. He was coached as a young player by Ian Triggs.

== Career ==
Smylie became the 2019 Australian Boys' Amateur champion. A left-handed player, he turned professional in February 2021 having twice won the Keperra Bowl, and was runner-up to Brad Kennedy at The Players Series in January 2021. He has had Mike Clayton as his caddie in events in Australia. He set a course record of 63 on The National Golf Club's Moonah course during The National Tournament on Victoria's Mornington Peninsula. He was runner up at the New South Wales Open in 2021.

=== 2024: Breakout year ===
In June 2024, Smylie qualified at the Final Qualifying event at Royal Cinque Ports Golf Club for the 2024 Open Championship at Royal Troon. He claimed his first professional victory in October at the Bowra & O'Dea Nexus Advisernet WA Open, beating Jak Carter in a playoff. A month later, Smylie won the weather-shortened BMW Australian PGA Championship at the Royal Queensland Golf Club, an event co-sanctioned by the European Tour and the PGA Tour of Australasia. He shot a final-round 67 to beat Cameron Smith by two shots. Smylie went on to secure the 2024–25 PGA Tour of Australasia Order of Merit.

=== 2026 ===
Smylie joined the 2026 LIV Golf League, and won his debut event in Riyadh on 8 February 2026 ahead of Spaniard Jon Rahm, after shooting an 8-under-par final round of 64 in the 72 hole event.

== Personal life ==
He is the son of former professional tennis players Liz and Peter Smylie. He was named after Elvis Presley. Family friends include Ian Baker-Finch and Wayne Grady. He is a member of Southport Golf Club in Australia. He has spent time staying with Cameron Smith, who has been described as a mentor to him.

== Amateur wins ==
- 2019 Keperra Bowl, Australian Boys' Amateur
- 2020 Keperra Bowl, Queensland Stroke Play Championship

== Professional wins (3) ==
=== European Tour wins (1) ===
No.	Date	Tournament	Winning score	Margin of victory	Runner-up
1	24 Nov 2024 (2025 season)	BMW Australian PGA Championship^{1}	−14 (65-67-67=199) (Note: Shortened to 54 holes due to weather.)	2 strokes	(Australia) Cameron Smith

^{1}Co-sanctioned by the PGA Tour of Australasia

=== PGA Tour of Australasia wins (2) ===
No.	Date	Tournament	Winning score	Margin of victory	Runner-up
1	20 Oct 2024	Bowra & O'Dea Nexus Advisernet WA Open	−19 (67-64-65-69=265)	Playoff	(Australia) Jak Carter
2	24 Nov 2024	BMW Australian PGA Championship^{1}	−14 (65-67-67=199)	2 strokes	(Australia) Cameron Smith

^{1}Co-sanctioned by the European Tour

PGA Tour of Australasia playoff record (1–0)

No.	Year	Tournament	Opponent	Result
1	2024	Bowra & O'Dea Nexus Advisernet WA Open	(Australia) Jak Carter	Won with birdie on first extra hole

=== LIV Golf League wins (1) ===
No.	Date	Tournament	Winning score	Margin of victory	Runner-up
1	7 Feb 2026	LIV Golf Riyadh	−24 (66-69-65-64=264)	1 stroke	(Spain) Jon Rahm

== Results in major championships ==
Tournament	2024	2025	2026
Masters Tournament			
PGA Championship		T72	T75
U.S. Open			
The Open Championship	CUT	CUT	

Did not play

CUT = missed the half way cut
"T" indicates a tie for a place
