= Stacey Keating =

Australian golfer

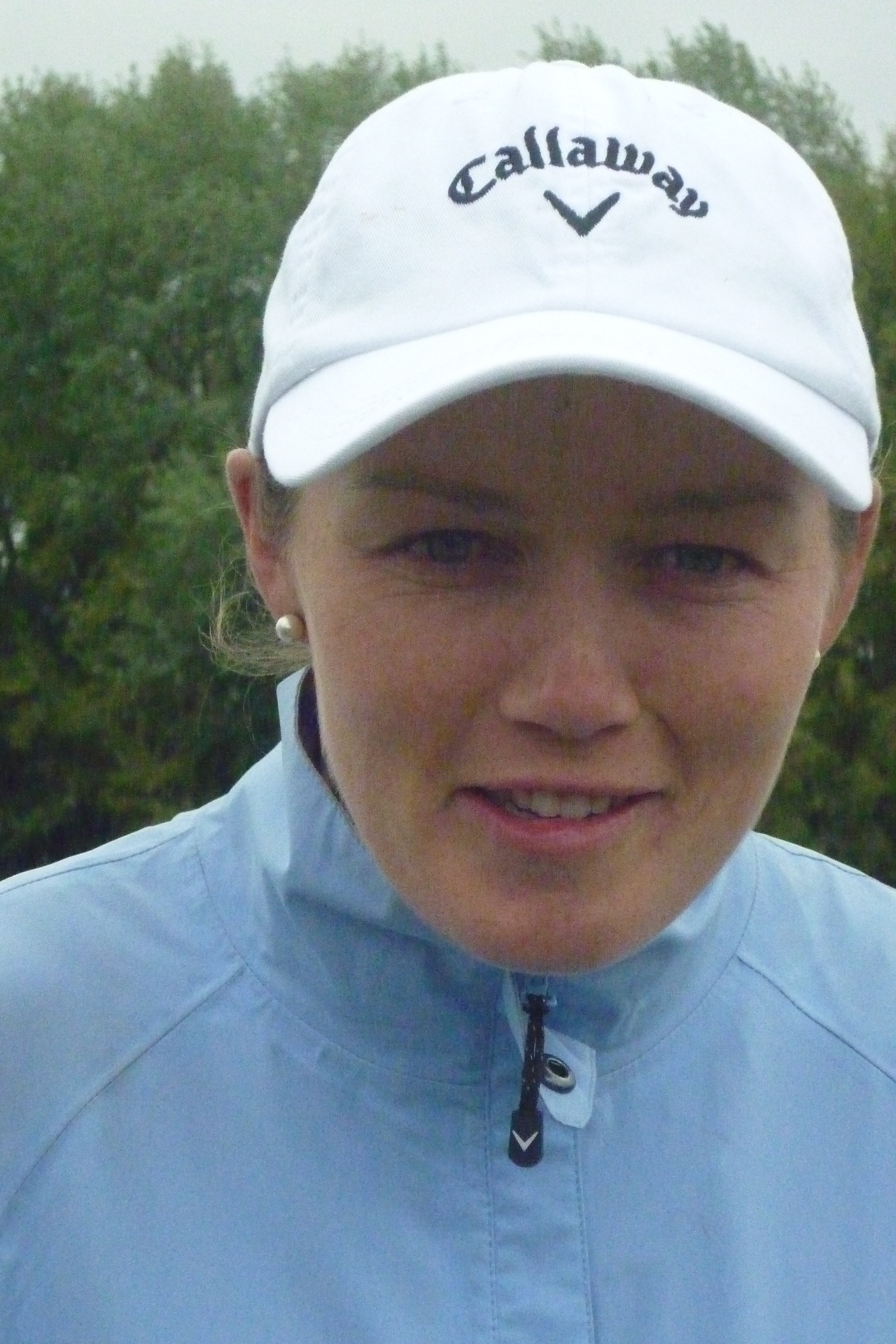

Personal information
- Nationality: Australia
- Born: 21 June 1986 (age 40) Ballarat, Victoria, Australia
- Height: 1.72 m (5 ft 8 in)

Career
- Sport: Golf
- Turned professional: 2010
- Current tours: ALPG Tour; Ladies European Tour; LPGA Tour
- Professional wins: 9

Number of wins by tour
- Ladies European Tour: 2
- WPGA Tour of Australasia: 7

Best results in LPGA major championships
- Chevron Championship: DNP
- Women's PGA C'ship: T58: 2014
- U.S. Women's Open: CUT: 2014
- Women's British Open: T56: 2015
- Evian Championship: DNP

Stacey Keating (born 21 June 1986) is an Australian golfer who won the 2012 Open de France Dames and 2012 Open De España Femenino.

Originally from Werneth, near Colac, Victoria, she and competed at the 2013 U.S. Women's Open, where she missed the cut.

Keating won twice on the Ladies European Tour in 2012 and finished sixth on the Order of Merit.

In December 2013, Keating earned conditional status on the LPGA Tour for the 2014 season by finishing tied for 38th place at the final stage of Q-school.

== Amateur wins ==
- 2006 Victorian Women's Amateur Championship
- 2007 Irish Women's Open Stroke Play Championship
- 2008 Canadian Women's Amateur
- 2010 Australian Women's Amateur, Victorian Women's Amateur Championship

== Professional wins (9) ==
=== Ladies European Tour wins (2) ===
- 2012 (2) Open de France Dames, Open De España Femenino

=== ALPG Tour wins (7) ===
- 2011–12 (2) Hahn Premium Light & Konami Port Kembla Golf Club Pro-Am, Mount Broughton Ladies Classic
- 2012–13 (2) The Vintage Golf Club Pro-Am, Women's Victorian Open
- 2015–16 (3) Anita Boon Pro Am, Bing Lee Fujitsu General Pro Am, Brisbane Invitational

== Team appearances ==
Amateur

- Espirito Santo Trophy (representing Australia): 2010
- Tasman Cup (representing Australia): 2008 (winners), 2009
- Queen Sirikit Cup (representing Australia): 2009, 2010

Professional

- The Queens (representing Australia): 2016
