= Miriam Nagl =

Brazilian golfer (born 1981)

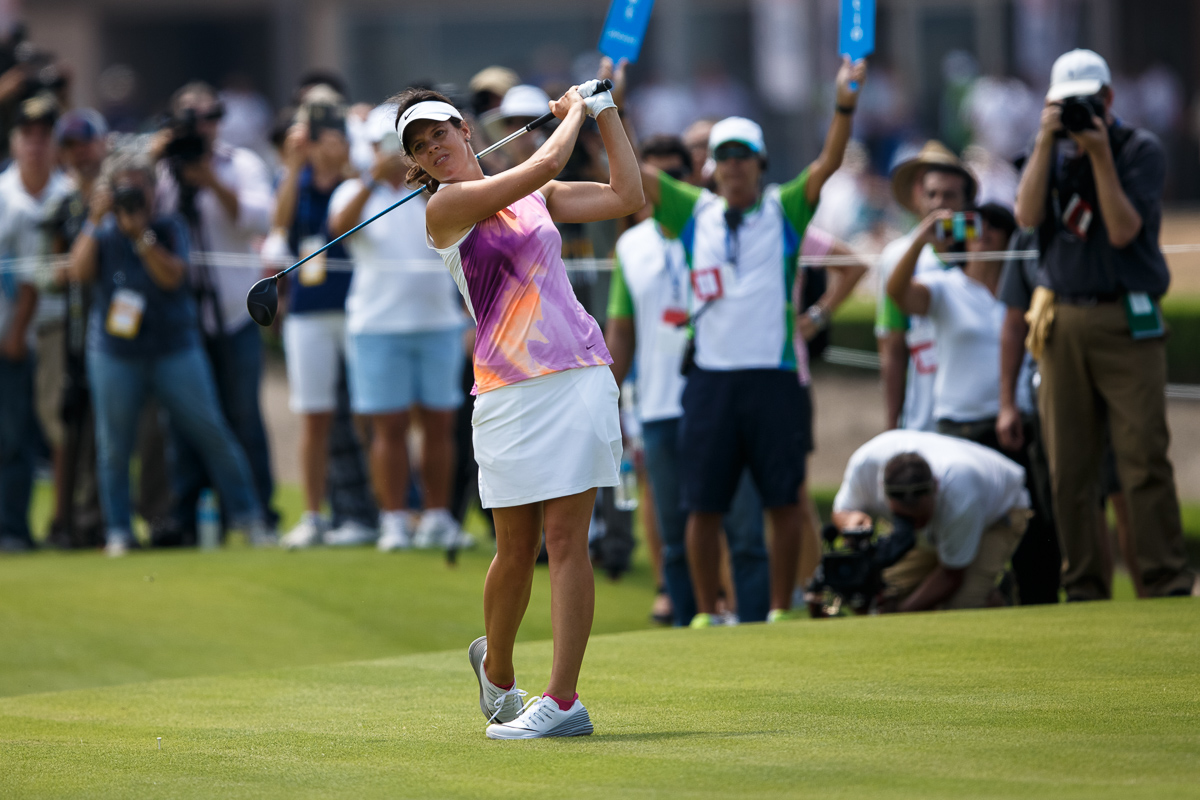

Personal information
- Nationality: Brazil; Germany
- Born: 22 January 1981 (age 45) Curitiba, Brazil
- Height: 1.72 m (5 ft 8 in)

Career
- Sport: Golf
- College: Arizona State University
- Turned professional: 2001
- Former tours: Ladies European Tour (2005–16); LPGA Tour (2003–08); Futures Tour
- Professional wins: 3

Number of wins by tour
- WPGA Tour of Australasia: 1
- Epson Tour: 2

Best results in LPGA major championships
- Chevron Championship: DNP
- Women's PGA C'ship: T54: 2006
- U.S. Women's Open: CUT: 2003, 2005, 2008, 2016
- Women's British Open: T28: 2005
- Evian Championship: DNP

Miriam Nagl (born 22 January 1981) is a Brazilian professional golfer who played on the LPGA Tour and Ladies European Tour.

Nagl was born in Curitiba, Brazil. Her family moved to Germany when she was eight years old and she represented Germany until 2015. She was runner-up at the Girls Amateur Championship in 1997, 1998 and 1999.

Nagl played college golf at Arizona State University for one year, then turned professional in 2001. She played on the Futures Tour in 2002, winning twice. She played on the LPGA Tour from 2003 to 2008 and on the Ladies European Tour from 2005 to 2009. After returning to the Futures Tour for 2010 and 2011, she played on the Ladies European Tour from 2012 to 2016. She was runner-up at the 2005 Tenerife Ladies Open.

In 2016, she won the Moss Vale Ladies Classic on the ALPG Tour.

Nagl took part in the 2016 Summer Olympics in her native country.

== Professional wins (3) ==
=== ALPG Tour (1) ===
No.	Date	Tournament	Winning score	To par	Margin of victory	Runner-up
1	10 Jan 2016	Moss Vale Ladies Classic	71-69=140	–6	Playoff	(Mexico) Ana Menéndez

ALPG Tour playoff record (1–0)

No.	Year	Tournament	Opponent	Result
1	2016	Moss Vale Ladies Classic	(Mexico) Ana Menéndez	Won on third extra hole

=== Futures Tour (2) ===
No.	Date	Tournament	Winning score	To par	Margin of victory	Runner(s)-up
1	23 Jun 2002	Grand Rapids Futures Classic	68-71-63=202	–14	4 strokes	(Mexico) Lorena Ochoa (United States) Christina Kim
2	7 Jul 2002	Capital Region Futures Classic	71-71-68=210	–3	Playoff	(United States) Christina Kim

== Team appearances ==
Amateur

- Espirito Santo Trophy (representing Germany): 1998, 2000
- European Ladies' Team Championship (representing Germany): 1999
- Vagliano Trophy (representing the Continent of Europe): 1999 (winners)
