= Mount Broughton Classic =

Tournament information
- Location: New South Wales, Australia
- Established: 2011
- Courses: Mount Broughton Golf and Country Club
- Tour: ALPG Tour
- Format: Stroke play
- Month played: January
- Final year: 2016

Final champion
- (England) Felicity Johnson

The Mount Broughton Classic was a women's professional golf tournament on the ALPG Tour held at Mount Broughton Golf and Country Club in New South Wales, Australia. The inaugural tournament was played in 2011 and it was last held in 2016.

== Winners ==
Year	Winner	Country	Score	Margin of victory	Runner(s)-up	Ref
Mt Broughton Ladies Classic
2016	Felicity Johnson	England	−12	5 strokes	(Australia) Lauren Hibbert	
2015	No tournament					
Mount Broughton Classic
2014	Daniela Holmqvist	Sweden	−10	2 strokes	(Australia) Sarah Kemp	
2013	Caroline Hedwall	Sweden	−12	4 strokes	(Australia) Emma De Groot	
Mount Broughton Ladies Classic
2012	Stacey Keating	Australia	−6	2 strokes	(Australia) Rachel L. Bailey (Australia) Rebecca Flood	
Mount Broughton Classic
2011	Katherine Hull	Australia	−10	3 strokes	(Australia) Vicky Thomas	
