= Whitney Hillier =

Australian professional golfer (born 1990)

Personal information
- Nationality: Australia
- Born: 1 December 1990 (age 35) Geraldton, Western Australia, Australia
- Height: 5 ft 9 in (1.75 m)

Career
- Sport: Golf
- Turned professional: 2012
- Current tours: Ladies European Tour (joined 2013); ALPG Tour
- Professional wins: 1

Number of wins by tour
- WPGA Tour of Australasia: 1

Best results in LPGA major championships
- Chevron Championship: DNP
- Women's PGA C'ship: DNP
- U.S. Women's Open: DNP
- Women's British Open: T48: 2022
- Evian Championship: DNP

Whitney Hillier (born 1 December 1990) is an Australian professional golfer who plays on both the Ladies European Tour and ALPG Tour. In 2022, she won the Aramco Team Series – Bangkok team event and was runner-up at the Jabra Ladies Open in France.

== Early life and amateur career ==
Hillier was born in Geraldton, Western Australia and plays at Lincoln Golf Club, Torksey. She had a successful amateur career and won the 2008 Australian Girls' Amateur and the 2012 Riversdale Cup.

She was a 2012 member of Golf Australia's National Squad, and finished 3rd at the 2012 Espirito Santo Trophy Amateur Team Championships together with Brianna Elliott and Minjee Lee.

== Professional career ==
Hillier turned professional in 2012 and joined the Ladies European Tour in 2013. In her rookie season, she played in 15 tournaments and recorded a best finish of 3rd at the Allianz Ladies Slovak Open. She ended the season ranked 55th on the Order of Merit to secured her card for the 2014 season.

In 2014 her best finish was tied 8th at the Ladies Italian Open and in 2016 tied 10th at the ISPS Handa New Zealand Open. In 2017, she finished 3rd at the Ladies European Thailand Championship, two strokes behind winner Atthaya Thitikul, and in 2018 she was 4th at the Hero Women's Indian Open. In 2021, she was T5 at the Saudi Ladies International and finished 45th in the Race to Costa del Sol.

In 2022, Hillier won the Aramco Team Series – Bangkok team event, captaining a team with Chonlada Chayanun and Krista Bakker. The following week, she lost a playoff to Tiia Koivisto at the Jabra Ladies Open held at the Evian Resort Golf Club in France, after shooting her fifth career hole-in-one in the second round.

== Amateur wins ==
- 2008 San Diego Junior Masters, Australian Girls' Amateur
- 2009 St Rule Trophy
- 2012 Malaysian Ladies Amateur, Lake Macquarie Amateur, Riversdale Cup

== Professional wins (1) ==
=== ALPG Tour wins (1) ===
- 2019 Aveo Brisbane Invitational

== Playoff record ==
Ladies European Tour playoff record (0–1)

No.	Year	Tournament	Opponent	Result
1	2022	Jabra Ladies Open	(Finland) Tiia Koivisto	Lost to birdie on first extra hole

== Team appearances ==
Amateur

- Espirito Santo Trophy (representing Australia): 2012
- Queen Sirikit Cup (representing Australia): 2012

Professional

- The Queens (representing Australia): 2015, 2016, 2017
