= Felicity Johnson (golfer) =

English golfer

Personal information
- Nationality: England
- Born: 26 February 1987 (age 39) Birmingham, England
- Height: 163 cm (5 ft 4 in)

Career
- Sport: Golf
- Turned professional: 2006
- Former tours: Ladies European Tour (2007-2024); LPGA Tour (2013-2017); ALPG Tour
- Professional wins: 4

Number of wins by tour
- Ladies European Tour: 2
- WPGA Tour of Australasia: 2

Best results in LPGA major championships
- Chevron Championship: DNP
- Women's PGA C'ship: T34: 2015
- U.S. Women's Open: CUT: 2013
- Women's British Open: T56: 2020
- Evian Championship: 65th: 2021

Achievements and awards
- The Daily Telegraph Lady Golfer of the Year: 2005

Felicity Johnson (born 26 February 1987) is a retired English professional golfer who has played on the U.S.-based LPGA Tour and the Ladies European Tour.

== Amateur career ==
Johnson started playing golf at five years old, and left school at 16 to pursue an amateur career. This was successful, and in 2005 she was named The Daily Telegraph Lady Golfer of the Year in after winning the English Women's Amateur Championship, was a member of the winning Vagliano Trophy team, and won the Spirit International Amateur as part of the England Team.

== Professional career ==
Johnson turned professional in 2006 and joined the 2007 Ladies European Tour. She finished third at the 2008 ANZ Ladies Masters, the 2008 Göteborg Masters and the 2009 SAS Ladies Masters, before earning her maiden win at the 2009 Tenerife Ladies Open at Golf Costa Adeje. She shot 62 (−10) in the first round of 2008 Göteborg Masters at Lycke Golf Course, a Ladies European Tour record. She claimed her second win at the 2011 Lacoste Ladies Open de France, winning a playoff with Diana Luna, the second playoff loss at the tournament in a row for Luna who was beaten in identical circumstances by Trish Johnson the previous year.

She was runner-up at the 2015 Lalla Meryem Cup, the 2016 ISPS Handa New Zealand Open and 2018 Hero Women's Indian Open. She played on the LPGA Tour for five seasons between 2013 and 2017, where her best finish was a tie for 19th at the 2014 Canadian Pacific Women's Open.

Johnson also played on the ALPG Tour, where she won the 2016 Mount Broughton Classic and 2018 Brisbane Invitational.

Johnson announced her retirement from tour at the end of 2024, after 18 LET seasons and over 300 tournaments worldwide. She qualified to become a tournament referee.

== Amateur wins ==
- 2005 English Women's Amateur Championship

== Professional wins (4) ==
=== Ladies European Tour wins (2) ===
No.	Date	Tournament	Winning score	Margin of victory	Runner-up
1	29 Sep 2009	Tenerife Ladies Open	−14 (69-72-66-67=274)	2 strokes	(Wales) Becky Brewerton
2	2 Oct 2011	Lacoste Ladies Open de France	−14 (68-70-69-67=274)	Playoff	(Italy) Diana Luna

LET playoff record (1–0)

No.	Year	Tournament	Opponent	Result
1	2011	Lacoste Ladies Open de France	(Italy) Diana Luna	Won with par on first extra hole.

=== ALPG Tour wins (2) ===
No.	Date	Tournament	Winning score	Margin of victory	Runner-up
1	10 Jan 2016	Mount Broughton Classic	−12 (65-67=132)	5 strokes	(Australia) Lauren Hibbert
2	9 Mar 2018	Seasons Aged Care Brisbane Invitational	−2 (72)	Playoff	(Belgium) Manon De Roey (Australia) Breanna Gill (New Zealand) Hanee Song

ALPG playoff record (1–0)

No.	Year	Tournament	Opponents	Result
1	2018	Seasons Aged Care Brisbane Invitational	(Belgium) Manon De Roey (Australia) Breanna Gill (New Zealand) Hanee Song	Won with par on second extra hole. Song and Gill were eliminated by par on the first extra hole.

== Team appearances ==
Amateur

- European Girls' Team Championship (representing England): 2003
- European Lady Junior's Team Championship (representing England): 2004, 2006
- Vagliano Trophy (representing Great Britain & Ireland): 2005 (winners)
- Spirit International Amateur (representing England): 2005 (winners)
- European Ladies' Team Championship (representing England): 2005

Professional

- The Queens (representing Ladies European Tour): 2017
