= Kristie Smith =

Australian professional golfer (born 1988)

Personal information
- Full name: Kristie Lynn Smith
- Nationality: Australia
- Born: 7 August 1988 (age 38) Perth, Western Australia, Australia

Career
- Sport: Golf
- College: Oklahoma State University (one year)
- Turned professional: 2008
- Former tours: ALPG Tour; Futures Tour (joined 2009); Ladies European Tour (joined 2010)
- Professional wins: 4

Number of wins by tour
- Ladies European Tour: 1
- WPGA Tour of Australasia: 2
- Epson Tour: 2

Best results in LPGA major championships
- Chevron Championship: DNP
- Women's PGA C'ship: DNP
- U.S. Women's Open: DNP
- Women's British Open: CUT: 2010, 2011

Kristie Lynn Smith (born 7 August 1988) is an Australian professional golfer. She played on the Futures Tour and the Ladies European Tour.

== Early life and amateur career ==
In 1988, Smith was born. In 2006, she began attending Oklahoma State University in the United States. She won the OSSO Oak Tree Junior Championship, a prestigious local amateur event.

Smith was the 2008 Australian Amateur Champion. She was also the low amateur in the 2008 MFS Women's Australian Open at Kingston Heath Golf Club, finishing at one-under-par in tied 5th place.

== Professional career ==
In 2009, Smith turned pro. That year she earned playing privileges for the Futures Tour.

In December 2009, she also qualified for the Ladies European Tour. She won her first tournament as a professional in January 2010 at the Canberra Ladies Classic on the ALPG Tour. She won her second pro tournament on 11 April 2010 at the Daytona Beach Invitational on the Futures Tour.

== Amateur wins ==
- 2005 Western Australia State Amateur Championship, Aaron Baddeley Junior Championship, Jack Newton International Junior Classic
- 2006 OSSO Oak Tree Junior Championship, Duke University Junior Championship
- 2007 Victorian 72-Hole Stroke Play
- 2008 North and South Women's Amateur, Australian Women's Amateur

== Professional wins (4) ==
=== Ladies European Tour (1) ===
- 2011 (1) Pegasus New Zealand Women's Open (co-sanctioned with the ALPG Tour)

=== ALPG Tour (2) ===
- 2010 (1) Canberra Ladies Classic
- 2011 (1) Pegasus New Zealand Women's Open (co-sanctioned with the Ladies European Tour)

=== Futures Tour (2) ===
- 2010 (1) Daytona Beach Invitational
- 2012 (1) Tate & Lyle Players Championship

== Team appearances ==
Amateur

- Junior Tasman Cup (representing Australia): 2006
- Tasman Cup (representing Australia): 2007
- Queen Sirikit Cup (representing Australia): 2007, 2008
- Gladys Hay Memorial Cup (representing Western Australia): 2005, 2006, 2007
