= Kelsey Bennett =

Australian professional golfer (born 2000)

Personal information
- Nationality: Australia
- Born: 17 February 2000 (age 26)

Career
- Sport: Golf
- Turned professional: 2022
- Current tours: WPGA Tour of Australasia (joined 2022); Ladies European Tour (joined 2024)
- Former tour: LET Access Series (joined 2023)
- Professional wins: 3

Number of wins by tour
- Ladies European Tour: 1
- WPGA Tour of Australasia: 2
- Other: 1

Best results in LPGA major championships
- Chevron Championship: DNP
- Women's PGA C'ship: DNP
- U.S. Women's Open: DNP
- Women's British Open: CUT: 2023, 2026
- Evian Championship: CUT: 2026

Kelsey Bennett (born 17 February 2000) is an Australian professional golfer who plays on the WPGA Tour of Australasia and the Ladies European Tour. She won the 2026 Australian Women's Classic.

== Early life and amateur career ==
Bennett grew up in Mollymook in New South Wales, Australia and has been member of Mollymook Golf Club since the age of 10. Her other home club is St. Michael's.

She became a member of the NSW Women's Team in 2018. In 2019, she was runner-up at the Malaysian Ladies Amateur and lost in the semi-final of the Queensland Women's Amateur won by Stephanie Kyriacou. She lost the final of the 2020 NSW Women's Amateur, 3 and 2, to Grace Kim. In 2021, she won the Victorian Women's Amateur over Jeneath Wong, 3 and 2, and finished runner-up at the Women's Amateur Asia-Pacific at Abu Dhabi Golf Club, a stroke behind Mizuki Hashimoto.

In 2022, Bennett advanced to the semi-finals of the Australian Women's Amateur, quarter-finals of The Women's Amateur Championship, and round-of-16 at the U.S. Women's Amateur. She also finished top-16 at both the Women's NSW Open and Australian Women's Classic, events co-sanctioned by the Ladies European Tour.

Bennett represented Australia at the 2022 Espirito Santo Trophy at Le Golf National in Paris, and at the 2022 Asia-Pacific Amateur Ladies Golf Team Championship for the Queen Sirikit Cup in Singapore.

== Professional career ==
Bennett turned professional in 2022 and joined the WPGA Tour of Australasia. In 2023, she joined the LET Access Series where she recorded six top-10s and finished 14th in the Order of Merit in her rookie season.

Bennett came through a 13-way sudden-death playoff in final qualifying at Hankley Common to secure a place in the 2023 Women's British Open at Walton Heath, where she missed the cut by two strokes.

In February 2024, she won The Athena at Peninsula Kingswood Golf Club in Melbourne by going one-under, one-under and even in her three four-hole matches on Sunday.

In Bennett's first event in Europe in 2024, she held a one stroke lead heading into the final round of the Montauban Ladies Open, ultimately finishing third, two strokes behind winner Helen Briem. She made a handful of LET starts without missing a cut, before claiming her maiden LETAS victory at the Hauts de France – Pas de Calais Golf Open with a birdie on the first playoff hole.

In 2026, she won the Australian Women's Classic four strokes ahead of Meghan MacLaren and Caley McGinty at Magenta Shores Golf & Country Club.

== Amateur wins ==
- 2018 Faldo Series Australia Championship, Savannah Harbour Junior Shootout
- 2021 Tasmanian Open Championship, Northern Territory Women's Amateur, Victorian Women's Amateur

== Professional wins (3) ==
=== Ladies European Tour wins (1) ===
No.	Date	Tournament	Winning score	To par	Margin of victory	Runners-up
1	8 Mar 2026	Australian Women's Classic^	66-68-70-71=275	−13	4 strokes	(England) Meghan MacLaren (England) Caley McGinty

^Co-sanctioned with the WPGA Tour of Australasia

=== WPGA Tour of Australasia wins (2) ===
No.	Date	Tournament	Winning score	To par	Margin of victory	Runner(s)-up
1	25 Feb 2024	The Athena	16 (Note: The top 8 players advanced to a bracket with four-hole matches)	Even	2 strokes	(Australia) Amy Chu
2	8 Mar 2026	Australian Women's Classic^	66-68-70-71=275	−13	4 strokes	(England) Meghan MacLaren (England) Caley McGinty

^Co-sanctioned with the Ladies European Tour

WPGA Tour of Australasia playoff record (0–1)

No.	Year	Tournament	Opponent	Result
1	2023	WPGA Melbourne International	(Australia) Cassie Porter	Lost to par on fourth extra hole

=== LET Access Series (1) ===
No.	Date	Tournament	Winning score	To par	Margin of victory	Runners-up
1	14 Sep 2024	Hauts de France – Pas de Calais Golf Open	67-73=140 (Note: Shortened to 36 holes due to weather.)	−4	Playoff	(Switzerland) Anaïs Maggetti (England) Billie-Jo Smith

LET Access Series playoff record (1–0)

No.	Year	Tournament	Opponents	Result
1	2024	Hauts de France – Pas de Calais Golf Open	(Switzerland) Anaïs Maggetti (England) Billie-Jo Smith	Won with birdie on first extra hole

== Team appearances ==
Amateur

- Australian Women's Interstate Teams Matches (representing New South Wales): 2018, 2019, 2022
- Queen Sirikit Cup (representing Australia): 2022
- Espirito Santo Trophy (representing Australia): 2022
