= Joanna Klatten =

French professional golfer

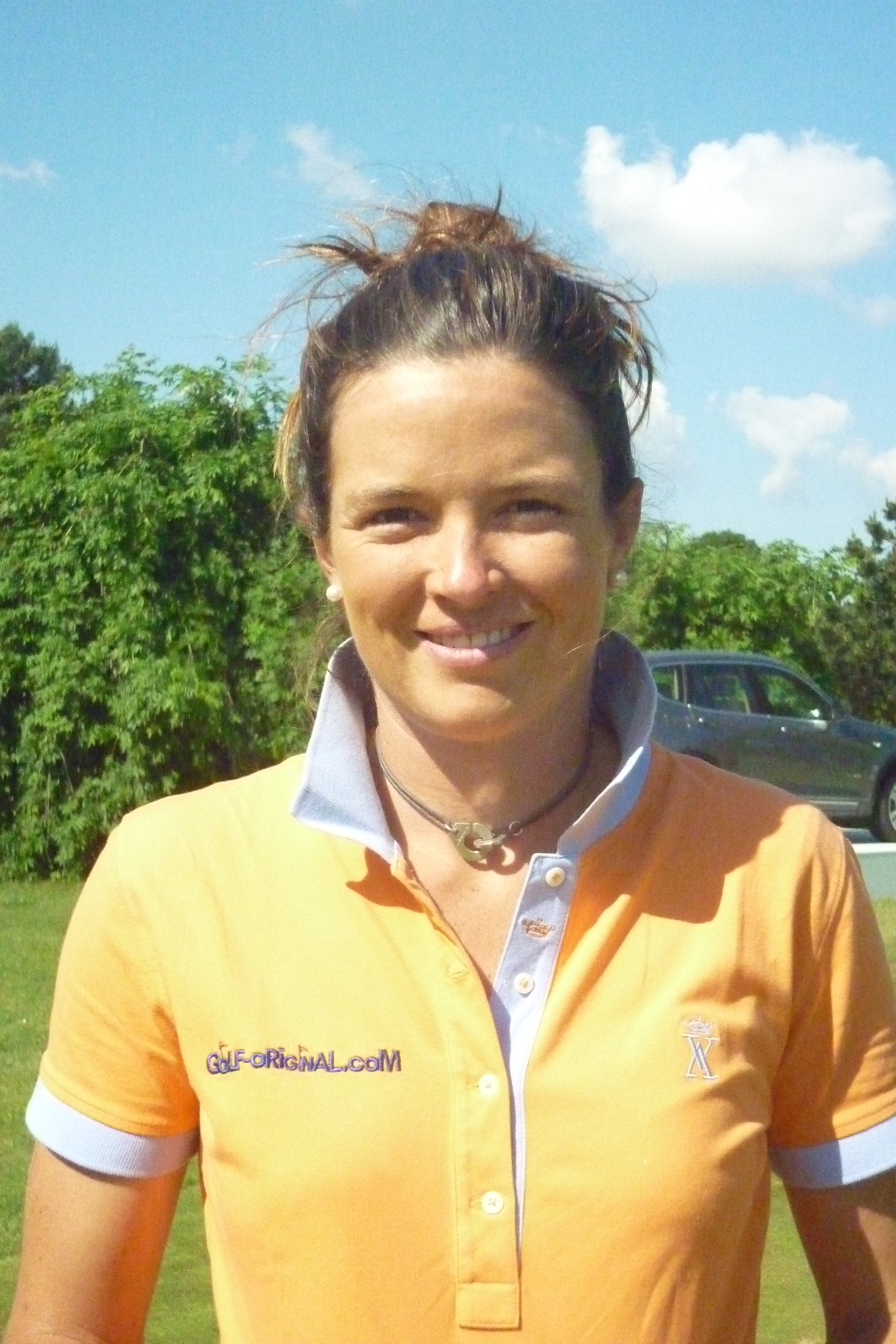

Personal information
- Nationality: France
- Born: 2 March 1985 (age 41) Paris, Île-de-France, France
- Height: 176 cm (5 ft 9 in)

Career
- Sport: Golf
- College: Georgia State University; College of Charleston
- Turned professional: 2010
- Current tours: Ladies European Tour (joined 2011); LPGA Tour (joined 2014)
- Professional wins: 4

Number of wins by tour
- WPGA Tour of Australasia: 4

Best results in LPGA major championships
- Chevron Championship: DNP
- Women's PGA C'ship: T29: 2017
- U.S. Women's Open: DNP
- Women's British Open: CUT: 2014, 2017
- Evian Championship: T40: 2017

Achievements and awards
- Kia Power Drive: 2015

Joanna Klatten (born 2 March 1985) is a French professional golfer who mainly played on the LPGA Tour. She won four tournaments on the ALPG Tour and climbed into the top-100 of the Women's World Golf Rankings in 2014.

== Amateur career ==
Klatten started playing golf at the age of 7, and won the Coupe Cachard at Golf de Saint-Cloud in 2006, setting an amateur course record of 63 (−9). While at Georgia State University she was a 2007 first-team All-CAA selection. She graduated from the College of Charleston in 2009, with a degree in Business Administration and Marketing.

As part of the national squad she represented France in the 2003 European Girls' Team Championship, 2004 European Lady Junior's Team Championship and 2008 European Ladies' Team Championship.

== Professional career ==
Klatten turned professional in late 2010 and joined the 2011 Ladies European Tour. She finished 3rd at the 2013 Open de Espana and the 2019 Lacoste Ladies Open de France.

Klatten won four tournaments on the ALPG Tour between 2012 and 2014, including the Women's NSW Open and the Women's Victorian Open. In 2014 she climbed into the top-100 of the Women's World Golf Rankings.

Klatten joined the LPGA Tour in 2014, and was runner-up at the Self Regional Healthcare Foundation Women's Health Classic on the Symetra Tour. She quickly become known as one of the LPGA tour's longest hitters, finishing third in driving distance her debut season. In 2015, she won the Kia Power Drive crown and took home a brand new Kia Sorento, with average drives of 274.4 yards, over five yards longer than her nearest competitor. She played six seasons on the LPGA Tour between 2014 and 2016, with a best finish of sixth at the 2016 Lotte Championship.

She retired from tour in 2021 after having only made a total of four starts in 2020 and 2021.

== Professional wins (4) ==
=== ALPG Tour wins (4) ===
No.	Date	Tournament	Winning score	Margin of victory	Runner(s)-up
1	8 Jan 2012	Women's Victorian Open	212 (−8)	Playoff	(South Korea) Haeji Kang
2	7 Jan 2014	BWAC Regional Employment & Community Services ALPG Pro-Am	70 (−3)	Playoff	(Australia) Bree Arthur
3	10 Jan 2014	Ingham's Antill Park Pro-Am	66 (−5)	1 stroke	(Australia) Sarah Kemp
4	26 Jan 2014	Bing Lee Fujitsu General Women's New South Wales Open	200 (−16)	3 strokes	(Canada) Nikki Campbell

== Results in LPGA majors ==
Tournament	2014	2015	2016	2017
ANA Inspiration				
U.S. Women's Open				
Women's PGA Championship	CUT	T62		T29
The Evian Championship	CUT	CUT	T48	T40
Women's British Open	CUT			CUT

Did not play

CUT = missed the half-way cut
"T" = tied

== Team appearances ==
Amateur

- European Girls' Team Championship (representing France): 2003
- European Lady Junior's Team Championship (representing France): 2004
- European Ladies' Team Championship (representing France): 2008
