= Karen Pearce =

Australian professional golfer

Personal information
- Nationality: Australia
- Born: 19 September 1968 (age 58)

Career
- Sport: Golf
- Turned professional: 1990
- Former tours: WPGA Tour of Australasia; LPGA Tour; Ladies European Tour; LPGA Futures Tour
- Professional wins: 7

Number of wins by tour
- WPGA Tour of Australasia: 5
- Epson Tour: 2

Best results in LPGA major championships
- Women's PGA C'ship: T42: 2002
- du Maurier Classic: T46: 2000
- Women's British Open: CUT: 2001

Karen Pearce (born 19 September 1968) is an Australian professional golfer who has played on the WPGA Tour of Australasia, Ladies European Tour, and the LPGA Tour.

== Career ==
Pearce had success as an amateur golfer and won the 1984 Queensland Foursomes Championship with Faye Payne. In 1988, she won the New South Wales Women's Amateur Championship, beating Tracie Hale 5 and 3 in the final.

Pearce turned professional in 1990 and later joined the Ladies European Tour. In 1998, she finished 4th at the McDonald's WPGA Championship at Gleneagles, and 8th at the Evian Masters. In 2000, she finished tied 3rd at the Waterford Crystal Ladies' Irish Open, six strokes behind winner Sophie Gustafson of Sweden. In 2002, she finished solo 6th at the Women's Australian Open.

Pearce played on the LPGA Tour between 1999 and 2004, where she made the cut at two different majors, the du Maurier Classic and the Women's PGA Championship. In 2000, she finished 12th at the Australian Ladies Masters, and in 2003 finished 14th at the State Farm Rail Classic. She also secured two titles on the LPGA Futures Tour, in 1997 and 2000. Over her LPGA Tour career, she started in 91 events and collected $226,945 in official prize money.

Between 2000 and 2023, Pearce won five titles in pro-am events on the WPGA Tour of Australasia.

Pearce retired from full-time professional golf after the 2004 season, and later became a prominent player in Australian senior women's tennis.

== Amateur wins ==
- 1984 Queensland Foursomes Championship (with Faye Payne)
- 1988 New South Wales Women's Amateur Championship

== Professional wins (7) ==
=== Futures Tour wins (2) ===
- 1997 Loretto Futures Golf Classic
- 2000 Southwestern Bell Futures Classic

=== WPGA Tour of Australasia wins (5) ===
- 2000 Lexus Ladies Pro-am
- 2002 St Georges Basin Country Club Pro-Am
- 2005 Moss Vale Golf Club Pro-Am
- 2013 Anita Boon Pro-Am
- 2023 Moss Vale Women's Classic Pro-am

== Results in LPGA majors ==
Results not in chronological order.

Tournament	2000	2001	2002	2003	2004
du Maurier Classic^	T46				
Women's British Open^		CUT			
Women's PGA Championship			T42		T69

^ The Women's British Open replaced the du Maurier Classic as an LPGA major in 2001.

Did not play

CUT = missed the half-way cut
T = tied
