= Karis Davidson =

Australian professional golfer (born 1998)

Personal information
- Nationality: Australia
- Born: 7 July 1998 (age 28) Melrose, Scotland
- Height: 5 ft 8 in (173 cm)

Career
- Sport: Golf
- Turned professional: 2017
- Current tours: LPGA Tour (joined 2022); ALPG Tour
- Former tour: LPGA of Japan Tour (joined 2018)
- Professional wins: 1

Number of wins by tour
- WPGA Tour of Australasia: 1

Best results in LPGA major championships
- Chevron Championship: T56: 2023
- Women's PGA C'ship: T12: 2026
- U.S. Women's Open: T22: 2026
- Women's British Open: CUT: 2025, 2026
- Evian Championship: T26: 2026

Achievements and awards
- Karrie Webb Scholarship: 2017

Karis Anne Davidson (born 7 July 1998) is an Australian professional golfer who plays on the LPGA Tour. In 2022, she won the WPGA Melbourne International, and in 2018 she was runner-up at the Women's Victorian Open, a Ladies European Tour event.

== Early life and amateur career ==
Davidson was born in Melrose, Scotland, where she started playing golf at the age of four. At the age of nine, she relocated with her family to Australia's Gold Coast, Queensland.

In 2013 she was runner-up at the Greg Norman Junior Masters. In 2014, she won the Sunshine Coast Ladies Open and the GNGF Junior Masters, and was runner-up at the Australian Girls' Amateur, plus lost the final of the Australian Women's Amateur to Minjee Lee. In 2015, she won the NSW Junior State Championship, and was runner-up at the Queensland Stroke Play & Amateur Championship, and the Australian Girls' Amateur.

In 2016, she won the Bowra & O'Dea Women's 72 Hole Classic, the Dunes Medal, and the Australian Girls' Amateur.

She represented Australia at the 2014 World Junior Girls Championship in Canada, the 2016 Espirito Santo Trophy in Mexico, and at the Queen Sirikit Cup, officially the Asia-Pacific Amateur Ladies Golf Team Championship, in 2016 and 2017.

In 2017, she was a semifinalist at the Australian Women's Amateur and won the Riversdale Cup. She was awarded the Karrie Webb Scholarship.

== Professional career ==
Davidson turned professional in 2017 and joined the LPGA of Japan Tour in 2018, after finishing 11th at the JLPGA Final Qualifying Tournament. She spent four seasons in Japan and made $444,839 in career earnings, with career-best finish a T4 at the 2018 Century21 Ladies Golf Tournament, won by Kristen Gillman.

Davidson also played on the ALPG Tour, where she finished solo second behind Minjee Lee at the 2018 Women's Victorian Open, a Ladies European Tour co-sanctioned event. In 2021 she finished T3 at the TPS Victoria, and in 2022 she was runner-up again at the Women's Victorian Open, this time behind Hannah Green, having secured her first professional title at the WPGA Melbourne International a few weeks earlier.

Davidson earned her LPGA Tour card for 2022 by finishing T41 at Q-School. In her rookie season she made 8 cuts in 11 starts and recorded a best finish of T8 at the Dow Great Lakes Bay Invitational. She went to back Q-School to retain her status.

== Amateur wins ==
- 2014 GNGF Junior Masters, Sunshine Coast Ladies Open
- 2015 NSW Junior State Championship
- 2016 Bowra & O'Dea Women's 72 Hole Classic, Australian Girls' Amateur, Dunes Medal
- 2017 Riversdale Cup

== Professional wins (1) ==
=== ALPG Tour wins (1) ===
No.	Date	Tournament	Winning score	To par	Margin of victory	Runner-up
1	24 Jan 2022	WPGA Melbourne International	68-69=137	−7	2 strokes	(Australia) Breanna Gill

== Team appearances ==
Amateur

- World Junior Girls Championship (representing Australia): 2014
- Espirito Santo Trophy (representing Australia): 2016
- Queen Sirikit Cup (representing Australia): 2016, 2017
