= Australian Women's Classic =

Coordinates: 30.383333°S 153.05°E

Australian Women's Classi

Tournament information
- Location: Bonville, New South Wales, Australia
- Established: 2018
- Course: Bonville Golf Resort
- Par: 72
- Tours: WPGA Tour of Australasia; Ladies European Tour
- Format: Stroke play
- Prize fund: €300,000
- Month played: April

Tournament record score
- Aggregate: 266 Stephanie Kyriacou (2020)
- To par: −22 as above

Current champion
- (Australia) Kelsey Bennett

Location in Australia

The Australian Women's Classic is a golf tournament co-sanctioned by WPGA Tour of Australasia Tour and the Ladies European Tour first held in 2018. It is played at the Bonville Golf Resort in Bonville, New South Wales, Australia.

== Winners ==
Year	Tours (Note: ALPG − ALPG Tour; LET − Ladies European Tour; WPGA – WPGA Tour of Australasia.)	Winner	Country	Score	To par	Margin of victory	Runner(s)-up
Australian Women's Classic
2026	LET, WPGA	Kelsey Bennett	Australia	275	−13	4 strokes	(England) Meghan MacLaren (England) Caley McGinty
2025	LET, WPGA	Manon De Roey	Belgium	201	−9	1 stroke	(England) Cara Gainer
2024	LET, WPGA	Nicole Broch Estrup; Tsai Pei-ying; Jess Whitting	Denmark; Chinese Taipei; Australia	66	−6	Title shared (Note: Title shared after heavy rainfall reduced tournament to 18 holes. LET classed the tournament as unofficial.)	
2023	WPGA	Breanna Gill	Australia	210	−6	Playoff	(Australia) Danni Vasquez
2022	LET, WPGA	Meghan MacLaren	England	206	−10	1 stroke	(Sweden) Maja Stark
Australian Ladies Classic – Bonville
2021	LET, ALPG	Cancelled due to COVID-19 pandemic					
2020	LET, ALPG	Stephanie Kyriacou (a)	Australia	266	−22	8 strokes	(South Korea) Ayeon Cho
2019	LET, ALPG	Marianne Skarpnord	Norway	280	−8	2 strokes	(Spain) Nuria Iturrios (Australia) Hannah Green
2018	LET, ALPG	Céline Boutier	France	278	−10	2 strokes	(United States) Katie Burnett
