= Katja Pogačar =

Slovenian professional golfer

Personal information
- Nationality: Slovenia
- Born: 12 April 1994 (age 32) Ljubljana, Slovenia
- Height: 167 cm (5 ft 5 1/2 in)

Career
- Sport: Golf
- College: Ohio State University
- Turned professional: 2017
- Current tours: Ladies European Tour (joined 2018); Symetra Tour (joined 2019)
- Former tour: LET Access Series

Best results in LPGA major championships
- Chevron Championship: DNP
- Women's PGA C'ship: DNP
- U.S. Women's Open: DNP
- Women's British Open: CUT: 2019, 2020
- Evian Championship: DNP

Katja Pogačar (born 12 April 1994) is a Slovenian professional golfer who plays on the Ladies European Tour and the Symetra Tour.

== Amateur career ==
Pogačar started playing golf at the age of 6 and was the top ranked female junior golfer in Slovenia between 2008 and 2012, winning the Slovenian Junior Championships four times in that period. She won the Leone di San Marco in 2012, the Hungarian Ladies Amateur in 2012, and the Czech Amateur Championship in 2014.

Pogačar represented Slovenia between 2008 and 2016 and competed in the European Young Masters, European Ladies Amateur Championship, European Ladies' Team Championship, and the Espirito Santo Trophy. She also represented Slovenia at the Duke of York Young Champions Trophy and was runner-up and the leading player in 2012. She also played her first professional tournament as an amateur at the Crete Ladies Open (2012 LET Access Series) finishing T-4.

After graduating from Gimnazija Poljane in 2013, Pogačar attended Ohio State University and graduated magna cum laude with a B.Sc. in Mathematics in May 2017. She played collegiate golf with the Ohio State Buckeyes as a student athlete from 2014 to 2017 and won three Big Ten Conference titles in 2014, 2015, and 2016. Pogačar was a three-time WGCA All-American Scholar, two-time Big Ten Distinguished Scholar, two-time second team All-Big Ten selection (2014 and 2017), and was All-Big Ten First Team pick in 2015 and 2016.

== Professional career ==
Pogačar made her professional debut in 2017 at the U.S. Women's Open Qualifier in St. Louis, Missouri. She ended her first professional year by earning her Ladies European Tour membership, finishing T-19 at the LET Final Qualifying School tournament. She began playing on the LET Access Series (LETAS) and became the first Slovenian to play on the Ladies European Tour (LET) in 2018. In 2019, Pogačar came close to her first professional win at the ActewAGL Canberra Classic, sharing the lead with Anne Van Dam going into the final round, eventually finishing second. The same year, she also became the first Slovenian to qualify and play on the Symetra Tour.

== Amateur wins ==
- Slovenian Junior Championship: 2008, 2009, 2010, 2012
- Leone di San Marco: 2012
- Hungarian Ladies Amateur: 2012
- Czech Amateur Championship: 2014
- Slovenian Ladies Amateur: 2013, 2015

== Team appearances ==
Amateur

- Espirito Santo Trophy (representing Slovenia): 2010, 2012, 2014, 2016
- European Young Masters (representing Slovenia): 2008, 2009, 2010
- European Ladies' Team Championship (representing Slovenia): 2009, 2011, 2013, 2014, 2015, 2016
