= Australian Women's Interstate Teams Matches =

Amateur team golf tournament

Tournament information
- Course: Royal Hobart Golf Club (2019)
- Format: Team match play
- Final year: 2019

Final champion
- New South Wales

The Australian Women's Interstate Teams Matches were an amateur team golf competition for women between the states of Australia. From 1933 it was contested for the Gladys Hay Memorial Cup.

The final format was a round-robin tournament, each team playing the other five teams, after which the top two teams play a final. Each team consisted of six players. Five competed in each round-robin contest with all six playing in the final. Only singles matches were played.

In 2020 the format for interstate team matches was changed so that the men's and women's event were combined into a single mixed-team event, the Australian Interstate Teams Matches.

== History ==
The Victorian Ladies' Golf Union was founded in 1906 and in 1907 they organised their first championship meeting, which followed the Australian Golf Union's championship meeting at Royal Melbourne. During the meeting at Victoria Golf Club they organised an interstate team match between Victoria and Tasmania, described as the "first inter-state ladies' match held in Australia". Six singles matches were played, with Victoria winning four and the other two matches halved. In 1909, the AGU championship meeting was again held at Royal Melbourne and the VLGU again held their championship meeting immediately afterwards at Victoria Golf Club. They were able to arrange a four-team knock-out event played on a single day, with the same format as in 1907. In the morning matches Victoria beat New South Wales while Tasmania beat South Australia, Tasmania winning by 12 holes to 7 after the contest finished tied at three each. Victoria beat Tasmania by four matches to two in the final.

From 1910 the matches were held during the Australian Golf Union championship meeting. In 1910 they were held over two days, one per day, but thereafter, with a maximum of four teams, the event was completed in a single day. The 1910 matches were held before the start of the qualifying rounds for the Australian Women's Amateur, with teams of five. South Australia beat New South Wales but lost to Victoria in the final. New South Wales won in 1911, beating Tasmania and then Victoria in the final. The final was tied at three matches each but New South Wales by 13 holes to 11. Victoria won in 1912 beating South Australia and Tasmania, New South Wales being unable to raise a team. Teams were increased to seven. There was no event in 1913 and it was not run again until 1920.

The event was played every year during the 1920s with between two and fours team. Victoria played each time and the home state was always represented, but otherwise states often failed to raise a team. Contests consisted of seven singles matches. Victoria won every year of the 1920s except 1925, when they lost narrowly to New South Wales. From 1930 teams were reduced to five. Four teams competed in 1930, Victoria continuing their run of success. New South Wales beat Victoria by three matches to two in 1931, but Victoria beat them by the same margin in 1932. Gladys Hay, a noted Victorian golfer had died in 1932 and from 1933 the winning team was presented with the Gladys Hay Memorial Cup. The first winners were Victoria, who beat New South Wales and Tasmania at Victoria Golf Club. In 1934 Victoria were beaten by New South Wales, losing all five matches. They had previously only three matches since the events started in 1907, all of them narrowly to New South Wales. New South Wales retained the cup in 1935 beating Victoria and Tasmania. South Australia won for the first time at Royal Adelaide in 1936, beating both Victoria and New South Wales by three matches to two. Victoria won the cup in 1937 and retained in 1938 and 1939. Queensland competed for the first time in Sydney in 1938 and were followed by Western Australia in 1939 at Kooyonga. In 1939 Western Australia reached the final, lost four matches to one to Victoria. With five teams the event was extended to a second day.

The event resumed in 1947, with New South Wales winning. Victoria won in 1948 but New South Wales won again in 1949 and 1950. All six states completed for the first time in 1949 at Royal Sydney. The event was held in Queensland for the first time in 1950. The format was changed in 1951, from a knock-out to a round-robin, with each state playing all the others, extending the event to three days. Tasmania did not complete. Queensland won the cup ahead of New South Wales. Both teams had won three of their four contests, but Queensland has won 15 matches to New South Wales' 12. All six states competed in 1952 with Victoria winning all five contests. Tasmania did not compete at Royal Perth in 1953, New South Wales finishing ahead of Victoria with 14 match wins to Victoria's 12. In 1954 at Brisbane, Queensland won the cup, ahead of Victoria. Both teams won four contests and 19 matches and the result was decided by holes ahead in those matches, Queensland winning by 65 holes to 48. 1954 was the last year in which extra holes were played to ensure a result in each match; from 1955 matches level after 18 holes were halved. In the first 12 years of the round-robin format, 1951 to 1962, Victoria won five times, Queensland four times and New South Wales three times. Western Australia did not compete at Kingston Beach in 1956 but otherwise all six states were represented after 1953.

The period from 1963 to 1978 was dominated by New South Wales who won 13 of the 16 events, were runners-up twice and third on the other occasion. They won eight times in a row from 1965 to 1972, winning all five contests each season from 1965 to 1970. After losing their final match to Queensland in 1962 they were undefeated until losing to Victoria in 1972. Victoria won from 1979 to 1981, winning all five contests in 1980. In 1982 Queensland won for the first time since 1962. New South Wales won 8 times in 10 years from 1983 to 1992 with Queensland winning again in 1987 and 1993 and Western Australia winning for the first time in 1989.

From 1994 to 2010 foursomes were added, extending the event to five days. The exception was in 2003 when the foursomes matches were dropped. Up to 1995 the event was played around the same time and location as the Australian Women's Amateur, but from 1996 it was played as a separate event. From 1999 to 2003 stroke-play matches were played. From 2008 to 2010 the number of foursomes matches was increased to three, although in 2008 one set of foursomes matches was not played. In 2011 the foursomes were dropped, except in the final, returning to the format used before 1994. Foursomes were dropped completely from 2012. A final was introduced from 2011 between the leading two teams in the round-robin, to decide the winner of the event. Western Australia won on 2011, 2012 and 2014, despite finishing the round-robin stage in second place on each occasion. Otherwise the team that led the round-robin won the final. Victoria won in 2013, 2015 and 2017 with Queensland winning in 2016. New South Wales won in 2018 and 2019.

== Results ==
Year	Winners	Final	RR	Runners-up	RR	Teams	Venue	Ref.
2019	New South Wales	5.5–0.5	4–18.5	Queensland	4–18.5	6	Royal Hobart	
2018	New South Wales	4–2	4.5–18.5	Western Australia	3.5–15	6	Glenelg	
2017	Victoria	3.5–2.5	5–18	New South Wales	4–18	6	Royal Fremantle	
2016	Queensland	4–2	5–21	Victoria	3–16	6	Royal Queensland	
2015	Victoria	3.5–2.5	4.5–17	Western Australia	4–17	6	Royal Melbourne	
2014	Western Australia	5–1	3.5–16	New South Wales	4–18.5	6	Gungahlin Lakes	
2013	Victoria	5–1	4.5–21.5	Western Australia	4–16	6	Royal Hobart	
2012	Western Australia	6–0	3.5–16.5	Victoria	4–19	6	West Lakes	
2011	Western Australia	6–3	4–18	New South Wales	5–21	6	Western Australian	
2010	Queensland & Victoria		4–26	Tie		6	McLeod	
2009	New South Wales		4–23.5	South Australia	3.5–24	6	Peninsula	
2008	New South Wales		4–24	Queensland	4–22	6	Pymble	
2007	Queensland		5–23	New South Wales	3.5–22.5	6	Barwon Heads	
2006	South Australia		4–23.5	New South Wales	4–22.5	6	Devonport	
2005	Western Australia		4–27	Victoria	4–22.5	6	Royal Fremantle	
2004	New South Wales		4–22.5	Queensland & Victoria	3.5–21	6	McLeod	
2003	New South Wales		5–17	Western Australia	4–18	6	Victoria	
2002	Queensland		4–22	Victoria	3.5–23	6	Royal Adelaide	
2001	New South Wales		4.5–27	South Australia	4–23.5	6	Ryde-Parramatta	
2000	New South Wales		5–28	South Australia	3–19	6	Tasmania	
1999	New South Wales		4.5–25.5	Victoria	4–21.5	6	Western Australian	
1998	Queensland		5–26.5	South Australia	3–21.5	6	Brisbane	
1997	Western Australia		4–24.5	New South Wales	4–22.5	6	Commonwealth	
1996	Victoria		4–23.5	Queensland & South Australia	3–20	6	Grange	
1995	Queensland		3.5–21.5	New South Wales	3–19	6	Steelworks	
1994	Victoria		5–24.5	Western Australia	4–24.5	6	Cottesloe	
1993	Queensland		5–19	Western Australia	3–16	6	Royal Queensland	
1992	New South Wales		4–16.5	South Australia	3.5–15	6	Glenelg	
1991	New South Wales		4–18.5	Victoria	4–18	6	Royal Melbourne	
1990	New South Wales		4–17	Queensland	3.5–14.5	6	Tasmania	
1989	Western Australia		3.5–15.5	Queensland	3.5–14	6	Mount Lawley	
1988	New South Wales		4–15.5	South Australia	3.5–13	6	Pymble	
1987	Queensland		5–19	Victoria	3.5–15.5	6	Indooroopilly	
1986	New South Wales		4.5–18	Victoria	3–15	6	The Grange	
1985	New South Wales		4–17.5	Victoria	3.5–14.5	6	Peninsula	
1984	New South Wales		5–21.5	Victoria	4–18	6	Royal Hobart	
1983	New South Wales		5–18	Queensland	3.5–14	6	Melville Glades	
1982	Queensland		4–14.5	Victoria	3–14.5	6	Yowani	
1981	Victoria		4–17	New South Wales	3–15.5	6	Southport	
1980	Victoria		5–21.5	New South Wales	4–13	6	Yarra Yarra	
1979	Victoria		4–17	South Australia	3–15	6	Glenelg	
1978	New South Wales		4–17	Victoria	3–13.5	6	Tasmania	
1977	New South Wales		5–18	Victoria	3–14	6	Royal Perth	
1976	New South Wales		4.5–18	Victoria	3.5–17	6	Royal Sydney	
1975	Victoria		3.5–14.5	New South Wales & Western Australia	3–14	6	Indooroopilly	
1974	New South Wales		5–18.5	Queensland	4–15.5	6	Kooyonga	
1973	Victoria		4–15.5	South Australia	3.5–15.5	6	Metropolitan	
1972	New South Wales		4–17	Queensland	4–16.5	6	Barwon Heads	
1971	New South Wales		4.5–18	Victoria	4–16.5	6	Mount Lawley	
1970	New South Wales		5–22.5	Victoria	4–14.5	6	Pymble	
1969	New South Wales		5–22.5	Western Australia	3–13	6	Royal Hobart	
1968	New South Wales		5–20	Queensland	4–18	6	Royal Queensland	
1967	New South Wales		5–17	South Australia	3–17	6	Royal Adelaide	
1966	New South Wales		5–22	Victoria	4–16	6	Kingston Heath	
1965	New South Wales		5–23.5	Victoria	3.5–14.5	6	Royal Perth	
1964	Victoria		4.5–16.5	New South Wales	4.5–15	6	Kingston Beach	
1963	New South Wales		4–19	Victoria	3.5–16.5	6	Royal Sydney	
1962	Queensland		5–20	New South Wales	3.5–15.5	6	Glenelg	
1961	Victoria		5–20	Queensland	4–19.5	6	Royal Queensland	
1960	Victoria		5–19	New South Wales	4–15.5	6	Royal Sydney	
1959	New South Wales		4–17	South Australia & Western Australia	3.5–14.5	6	Royal Perth	
1958	Victoria		5–19	New South Wales	4–17.5	6	Royal Melbourne	
1957	Victoria		5–18.5	South Australia	3.5–14.5	6	Royal Adelaide	
1956	Queensland		4–13	Tasmania	3–15	5	Kingston Beach	
1955	New South Wales		5–21	Victoria	4–16	6	The Australian	
1954	Queensland		4–19	Victoria	4–19	6	Brisbane	
1953	New South Wales		3–14	Victoria	3–12	5	Royal Perth	
1952	Victoria		5–20	New South Wales	3–16	6	Kingston Heath	
1951	Queensland		3–15	New South Wales	3–12	5	Kooyonga	
1950	New South Wales	3–2		Queensland		5	Royal Queensland	
1949	New South Wales	3–2		Victoria		6	Royal Sydney	
1948	Victoria	3–2		Queensland		5	Commonwealth	
1947	New South Wales	3–2		South Australia		4	Royal Adelaide	
1940–1946: No tournament due to World War II
1939	Victoria	4–1		Western Australia		5	Kooyonga	
1938	Victoria	4–1		Queensland		3	The Australian	
1937	Victoria	5–0		South Australia		3	Metropolitan	
1936	South Australia	3–2		New South Wales		3	Royal Adelaide	
1935	New South Wales	5–0		Tasmania		4	Royal Melbourne	
1934	New South Wales	5–0		Victoria		2	Royal Sydney	
1933	Victoria	4–1		Tasmania		4	Victoria	
1932	Victoria	3–2		New South Wales		3	Kooyonga	
1931	New South Wales	3–2		Victoria		2	The Australian	
1930	Victoria	5–0		South Australia		4	Commonwealth	
1929	Victoria	7–0		South Australia		2	Royal Adelaide	
1928	Victoria	4–3		New South Wales		2	Royal Sydney	
1927	Victoria	6–1		New South Wales		4	Royal Melbourne	
1926	Victoria	4–3		New South Wales		3	Royal Adelaide	
1925	New South Wales	4–3		Victoria		2	The Australian	
1924	Victoria	6–1		South Australia		4	Royal Melbourne	
1923	Victoria	6–1		South Australia		2	Royal Adelaide	
1922	Victoria	4–3		New South Wales		2	Royal Sydney	
1921	Victoria	7–0		Tasmania		2	Royal Melbourne	
1920	Victoria	4–3		New South Wales		2	The Australian	
1914–1919: No tournament due to World War I
1913	Not held							
1912	Victoria	5–2		Tasmania		3	Royal Melbourne	
1911	New South Wales	3–3		Victoria		3	Royal Sydney	
1910	Victoria	4–1		South Australia		3	Royal Adelaide	
1909	Victoria	4–2		Tasmania		4	Victoria	
1908	Not held							
1907	Victoria	5–1		Tasmania		2	Victoria	

RR– Team's score in the round-robin stage. Contests won and individual matches won. Positions were determined by the number of team points and where that was equal by the number of individual match points.

A number of events were scored on the basis of two points for a win and one point each for a halved contest. For consistency contests in the table above are scored as one point for a win and half a point each for a halved match.

From 1951 to 1993 each contest consisted of 5 singles matches, so that, when all six teams were competing, each team played a total of 25 individual matches. In 1994 to 2007 there were an additional 2 foursomes matches, increasing the number of individual matches to 35. The exception was in 2003 when the foursomes matches were dropped. From 1999 to 2003 stroke-play matches were played. From 2008 to 2010 there was a third foursomes match, increasing the number of individual matches to 40. In 2008, one set of foursomes matches was not played, reducing the number of individual matches to 37. In 2011 the foursomes were dropped, except in the final, returning to the format used before 1994. Foursomes were dropped completely from 2012. However, a final was introduced from 2011, between the leading two teams in the round-robin, to decide the winner of the event.

== See also ==
- Australian Women's Amateur
- Australian Men's Interstate Teams Matches
