= Commonwealth Golf Club =

- Interactive map of Commonwealth Golf Club
- 37°55′46″S 145°5′20″E

Club information
- Tournaments: Australian Open Victorian Open

The Commonwealth Golf Club is a golf club in Oakleigh South, Victoria, Australia. It has hosted many events over the years, notably the Australian Open, Women's Australian Open and Victorian Open.

== Winners at Commonwealth ==
- 1961 Victorian Open – Alan Murray
- 1967 Australian Open – Peter Thomson
- 1972 Victorian Open – Walter Godfrey
- 2010 Women's Australian Open – Yani Tseng
- 2011 Women's Australian Open – Yani Tseng

== See also ==
- List of links golf courses
