= Women's Victorian Open =

Australian golf tournament

Coordinates: 38.278°S 144.458°E

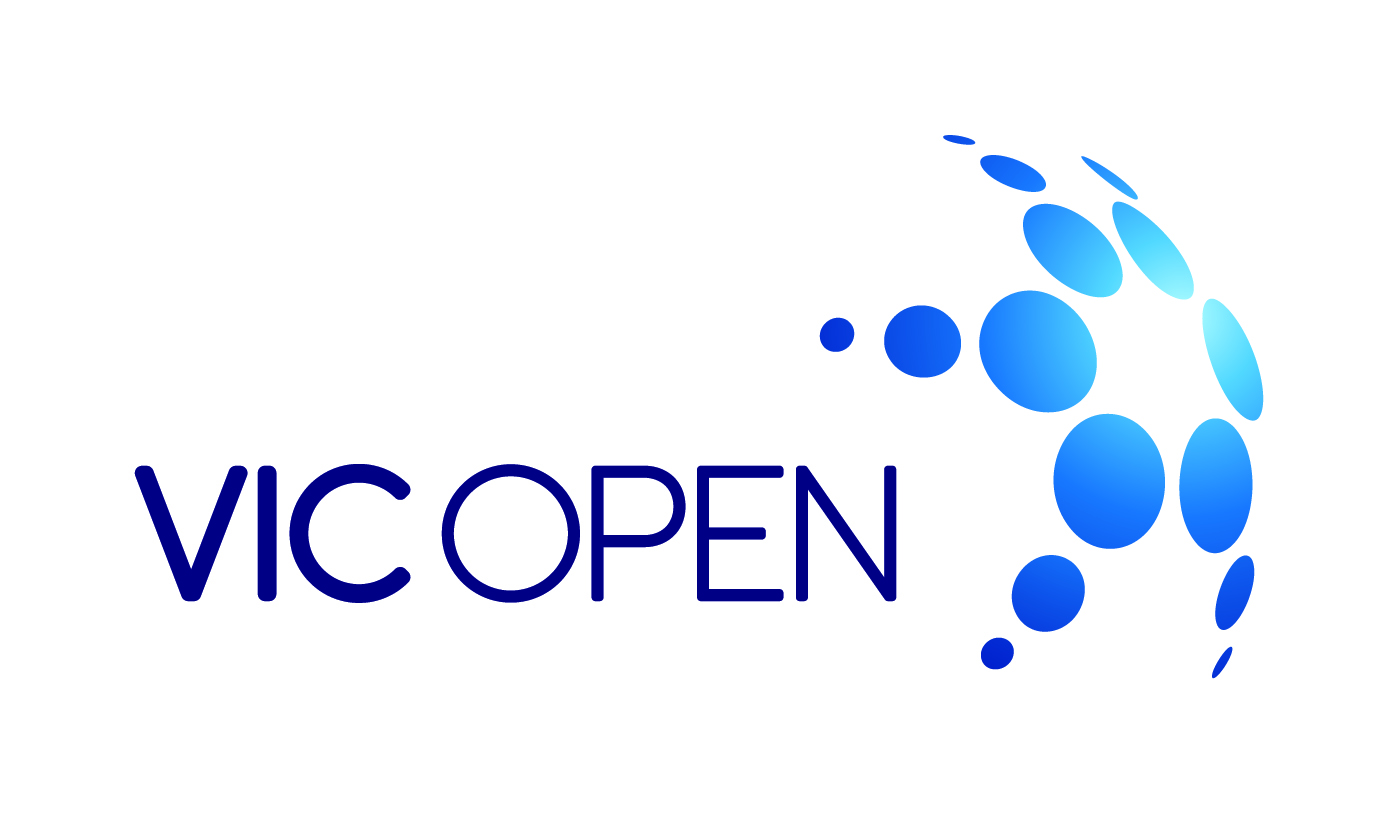

Tournament information
- Location: Barwon Heads, Victoria, Australia
- Established: 1988
- Courses: 13th Beach Golf Links (Beach and Creek Courses)
- Par: 72
- Tours: WPGA Tour of Australasia; LPGA Tour (2019–2020); Ladies European Tour (2017–2018)
- Format: Stroke play
- Prize fund: A$200,000
- Month played: February

Current champion
- (Wales) Lydia Hall

Final champion
- Location in Australia Location in Victoria

Location in greater Melbourne

The Women's Victorian Open is an annual golf tournament held in Australia. It was founded in 1988 and played annually through 1992. After a 20-year hiatus it returned in 2012 as a tournament on the WPGA Tour of Australasia.

This was the first time the men's Victorian Open and women's Victorian Open were held concurrently - making it the only professional golf tournament in the world where men and women played the same courses, at the same time, for equal prize money.

In 2013, the men's and women's Victorian Opens moved to 13th Beach Golf Links in Barwon Heads, southwest of Melbourne, near the southwest shore (Bass Strait) of the Bellarine Peninsula.

When the tournament moved to 13th Beach Golf Links in 2013, the combined prize pool was A$300,000, with $150,000 on offer for each of the men's and women's fields.

In six years, the total prize pool has increased ten-fold, with the 2019 men's and women's Victorian Open fields to be playing for a total purse of $3 million ($1.5 million each).

In 2017 and 2018, the event were co-sanctioned by the Ladies European Tour and the ALPG Tour. Like its men's counterpart, it is a two-cut tournament. The field is reduced to 60 after the second round and 35 after the third round; those who fail to make the second cut earn prize money.

The event was co-sanctioned by the LPGA Tour in 2019 and 2020. It is played alongside the men's Victorian Open. The double cut continues; 65 players will remain after the first cut, then 35 players after the Saturday cut.

== Winners ==
Year	Tour(s) (Note: ALPG − ALPG Tour; LET − Ladies European Tour; LPGA − LPGA Tour; WPGA − WPGA Tour of Australasia.)	Winner	Country	Score	To par	Venue	Purse (A$)	Ref
Vic Open
2026	WPGA	Lydia Hall	Wales	289	E	13th Beach Golf Links	200,000	
2025	WPGA	Su Oh	Australia	289	E	13th Beach Golf Links	200,000	
2024	WPGA	Ashley Lau	Malaysia	277	−12	13th Beach Golf Links	420,000	
2023	WPGA	Jiyai Shin	South Korea	275	−14	13th Beach Golf Links	420,000	
2022	WPGA	Hannah Green	Australia	276	−13	13th Beach Golf Links	410,000	
2021	Tournament cancelled							
ISPS Handa Vic Open
2020	ALPG · LPGA	Park Hee-young	South Korea	281^{PO}	−8	13th Beach Golf Links	US$1,100,000	(Note: 2020: Park Hee-young beat Choi Hye-jin with par on fourth extra hole, with Ryu So-yeon eliminated by birdie on second holes)
2019	ALPG · LPGA	Céline Boutier	France	281	−8	13th Beach Golf Links	US$1,100,000	
Oates Vic Open
2018	ALPG · LET	Minjee Lee (2)	Australia	279	−13	13th Beach Golf Links	650,000	(Note: 2018: Minjee Lee won her second Victorian Open title, after winning her first as an amateur in 2014.)
2017	ALPG · LET	Melissa Reid	England	276^{PO}	−16	13th Beach Golf Links	650,000	(Note: 2017: Reid beat Sandra Gal at the third hole of a sudden-death playoff)
2016	ALPG	Georgia Hall	England	281	−11	13th Beach Golf Links	300,000	
2015	ALPG	Marianne Skarpnord	Norway	279	−13	13th Beach Golf Links	250,000	
2014	ALPG	Minjee Lee (a)	Australia	279	−17	13th Beach Golf Links	150,000	
Women's Victorian Open
2013	ALPG	Stacey Keating	Australia	278	−18	13th Beach Golf Links	150,000	
2012	ALPG	Joanna Klatten	France	212	−7	Woodlands/Spring Valley		
1993–2011: No tournament
Heart Health Victorian Women's Open
1992	ALPG	Wendy Doolan	Australia	211	−5	Yarra Yarra		
1991	ALPG	Jennifer Wyatt	Canada	222	E	Woodlands		
Women's Victorian Open
1990	ALPG	Dale Reid	Scotland	212	−10	Commonwealth		
1989	ALPG	Susan Tonkin	Australia	227	+5	Commonwealth		
1988	ALPG	Helen Hopkins	Australia	219	−3	Commonwealth		

== See also ==
- Victorian Open – (concurrent men's tournament)
