= McLeod Country Golf Club =

Golf club in Australia

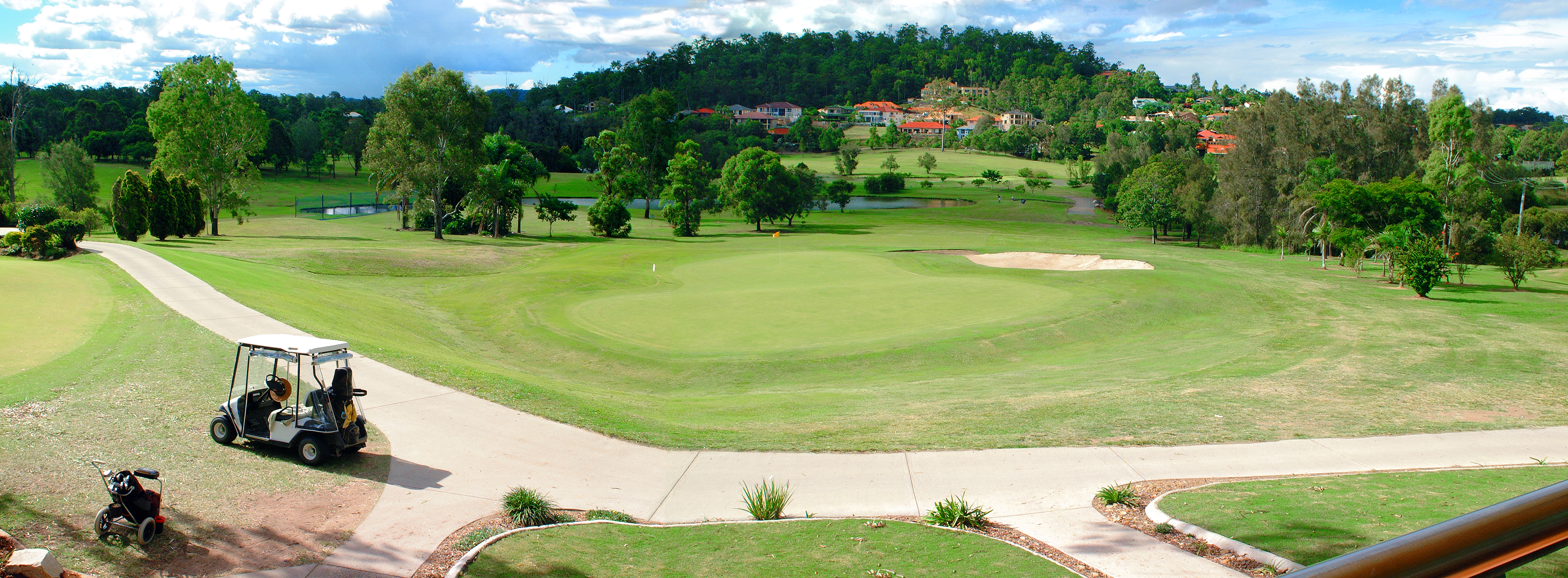
- McLeod Golf Course 18th hole

- Location in Queensland
- 27.5509°S 152.924°E

Club information
- Location: Brisbane, Queensland
- Established: 1968; 58 years ago
- Type: Semi-private
- Total holes: 18
- Greens: Tifdwarf 328 Bermuda
- Fairways: Common couch
- Website: http://www.mcleodgolf.com.au

Championship Course
- Designed by: Dr Clive Boyce OBE and Mr David Burrup
- Par: Members 74 (black tees): Fellows 71 (blue tees)
- Length: Members – 5487 metres; Fellow Members – 5880 metres
- Course rating: Members – 74: Fellow Members – 71;
- Slope rating: Black and Blue Markers – 132: Red and WhiteMarkers – 131:
- Course record: Black Markers – Liv Cheng, Sarah Kemp – 70 – 2015: Red Markers – Amy Yang – 67 – 2005: Blue Markers – Cameron Thomsett - 64 - 19.05.2003 David Louys-Moroney – 64 – 2013

McLeod Country Golf Club is an 18-hole golf course located in Mount Ommaney, Brisbane, Queensland, Australia.

It was the first golf club in Australia to give women members equal rights to men, and is one of few golf clubs in the world administered entirely by female members, although both men and women have always been playing members of the Club. In December 2020, the voting women members of the club voted to change the Club's constitution to give male members voting rights (voting male numbers may be equal to but not exceed voting female members), and the affairs of the Club are to be managed and exercised by a Board of nine (9) Directors. Five (5) of the Directors will be women and four (4) of the Directors will be men.

== History ==
The idea of a golf club where women would have equal rights as the men had been mooted since around 1963. Some years later, it was made known to Hilda Reid and Kathleen Atherton, who were members at Ashgrove Golf Club, that Centenary Estates were offering land for the development of a golf course. They subsequently met with Mr Peter Lightfoot, general manager of Centenary Estates. On 20 September 1968, Atherton signed an agreement on behalf of McLeod Country Golf Club to purchase the land for the price of $1; the sale was agreed on the provision that the buyers built the golf course. That one dollar note is now displayed in the foyer of the clubhouse. The initial nine-hole course was completed in 1972.

The name McLeod was used to honour Miss Gertrude McLeod, who had devoted her life to promoting women's golf in Queensland. She was president of the Queensland Ladies Golf Union for 30 years and president of the Australian Ladies Golf Union for five years.

== See also ==
- Golf in Australia
- Sport in Queensland
