= Queensland Open (golf) =

Isuzu Queensland Open
Tournament information
- Location: Pelican Waters, Queensland, Australia
- Established: 1925
- Course: Pelican Waters Golf Club
- Par: 72
- Length: 6,878 yards (6,289 m)
- Tours: PGA Tour of Australasia; Von Nida Tour
- Format: Stroke play
- Prize fund: A$125,000
- Month played: March

Tournament record score
- Aggregate: 268 Brad McIntosh (2005); 268 Ryan Haller (2007)
- To par: −20 as above

Current champion
- (Australia) Andrew Evans

Final champion
- Location in Australia Location in Queensland

The Queensland Open is a golf tournament held in Queensland, Australia as part of the PGA Tour of Australasia. It was founded in 1925. The event was not held from 2008 to 2012 but returned as a PGA Tour of Australasia event in 2013.

== Trophy ==
The winner receives the T. B. Hunter Cup. The trophy was donated by Thomas Brown Hunter in 1939, the winner to retain it for a year and receive a replica. The trophy was inscribed with the name of the previous winners. Hunter was secretary of Brisbane Golf Club from 1910 to 1938 and also secretary of the Queensland Golf Association. He won the Queensland Amateur Championship in 1913.

== History ==
The first Queensland Open was held at Brisbane Golf Club in June 1925, a 72-hole stroke play event held over two days. The inaugural event was won by Harry Sinclair, then still an amateur, by 7 strokes from Dick Carr. The Queensland Amateur had previously been held as a stroke play event but in 1925 the format was revised, with the Queensland Open acting as qualifying for the match-play amateur event. Sinclair went on to win the amateur championship the following week.

The event has not always been part of the PGA Tour of Australia's calendar. For example, in 1988 it was not a tour event. Since the 1990s, it has intermittently been an official PGA Tour of Australasia event though also part of the Australian Tour's satellite tours, the Foundation Tour and the Von Nida Tour.

The 2021 event proved to currently be the final edition of the tournament, with no tournament being scheduled for 2022 onwards.

== Winners ==
Year	Tour (Note: ANZ − PGA Tour of Australasia; FT − Foundation Tour; VNT − Von Nida Tour.)	Winner	Score	To par	Margin of victory	Runner(s)-up	Venue	Ref.
Isuzu Queensland Open
2021	ANZ	(Australia) Andrew Evans	270	−18	2 strokes	(Australia) Deyen Lawson (Australia) Bryden Macpherson (Australia) Blake Windred	Pelican Waters	
2020	ANZ	(Australia) Anthony Quayle	273	−15	Playoff (Note: Quayle won with par on first playoff hole.)	(Australia) Jack Thompson (a)	Pelican Waters	
2019: No tournament, moved from November to February
2018	ANZ	(Australia) Jordan Zunic	273	−11	1 stroke	(Australia) Rhein Gibson	Brisbane	
2017	ANZ	(Australia) Michael Sim	275	−9	1 stroke	(Australia) Oliver Goss (New Zealand) Kieran Muir	Brisbane	
2016	ANZ	(Australia) Brett Coletta (a)	273	−7	3 strokes	(Australia) Lucas Herbert	Brisbane	
2015	ANZ	(Australia) David Bransdon	276	−12	Playoff (Note: Bransdon won with birdie on third playoff hole.)	(Australia) Rohan Blizard	Brookwater	
2014	ANZ	(Australia) Andrew Dodt	281	−7	2 strokes	(Australia) Tom Bond	Brookwater	
2013	ANZ	(Australia) Nick Cullen	279	−9	5 strokes	(Australia) Peter O'Malley	Brookwater	
Queensland Open
2009–2012: No tournament
2008	VNT	Cancelled						
City Pacific-Mirvac Queensland Open
2007	VNT	(Australia) Ryan Haller	268	−20	3 strokes	(Australia) Ed Stedman	Gainsborough Greens	
Roadcon Group Queensland Open
2006	VNT	(Australia) Ricky Schmidt	274	−14	Playoff (Note: Schmidt won with birdie on second playoff hole.)	(Australia) Brad Kennedy (Australia) Tristan Lambert	Ipswich	
2005	VNT	(Australia) Brad McIntosh	268	−20	3 strokes	(Australia) Peter Senior	Ipswich	
QLD Group Queensland Open
2004	VNT	(Australia) Steven Bowditch	198 (Note: Shortened to 54 holes due to weather.)	−18	5 strokes	(Australia) Richard Ball (Australia) Brad McIntosh (Australia) Nigel Spence	Ipswich	
2003	VNT	(Australia) Scott Hend	275	−13	2 strokes	(Australia) Matthew Millar	Ipswich	
Queensland Open
2002	ANZ	(Australia) Andrew Buckle	274	−14	2 strokes	(Australia) Ryan Haller (Australia) Paul Sheehan (Australia) Craig Warren	Ipswich	
2000–01: No tournament
1999	FT	(Australia) Shane Tait	271	−13	3 strokes	(Australia) Craig Hanson (Australia) Peter Senior	Nudgee	
1998		(Australia) Jon Riley	204	−9	1 stroke	(Australia) Nathan Green	Nudgee	
1997: No tournament
Foodlink Queensland Open
1996	ANZ	(New Zealand) Steven Alker	275	−13	1 stroke	(Australia) Greg Chalmers	Windaroo	
Bank of Queensland Open
1995	FT	(Australia) Terry Price (2)	276	−12	3 strokes	(Australia) Stuart Bouvier (Australia) Anthony Edwards (Australia) Rod Pampling	Windaroo	
Foodlink Queensland Open
1994	ANZ	(Australia) Lucas Parsons	282	−6	2 strokes	(New Zealand) Michael Campbell	Windaroo	
Queensland Open
1993	FT	(Australia) Terry Price	279	−9	1 stroke	(Australia) Shane Tait	Windaroo	
1992	FT	(Australia) Jeff Senior (2)	146 (Note: Scheduled over 36 holes.)	+2	1 stroke	(Australia) Brett Officer (Australia) Andre Stolz	Windaroo	
1991	FT	(Australia) Stuart Appleby (a)	277	−7	3 strokes	(Australia) Mike Sprengel	Brisbane	
1990		(Australia) Ian Baker-Finch	incorporated into the Coolum Classic					
Mirage Queensland Open
1989	ANZ	(Australia) Brett Ogle	278	−14	3 strokes	(Australia) John Clifford	Royal Queensland	
Drinnan Motors Queensland Open
1988	ANZ	(Australia) Brett Officer	274	−10	Playoff (Note: Officer won with birdie on first playoff hole.)	(Australia) John Clifford (Australia) Brett Ogle	Caloundra	
Konica Queensland Open
1987	ANZ	(Australia) David Graham (2)	275	−13	7 strokes	(Australia) Vaughan Somers	Coolangatta-Tweed Heads	
Stefan Queensland Open
1986	ANZ	(Australia) Greg Norman (2)	277	−11	6 strokes	(Australia) Peter Senior (Australia) Jeff Woodland	Coolangatta-Tweed Heads	
1985	ANZ	(Australia) David Graham	269	−19	5 strokes	(Australia) Paul Foley	Coolangatta-Tweed Heads	
1984	ANZ	(Australia) Peter Senior	282	−6	7 strokes	(Australia) Wayne Grady	Royal Queensland	
1983	ANZ	(Australia) Greg Norman	277	−11	1 stroke	(Australia) Ossie Moore (Australia) Bob Shearer	Royal Queensland	
Dunhill Queensland Open
1982	ANZ	(Australia) Graham Marsh	285	−3	Playoff (Note: Marsh won with par on first playoff hole.)	(Australia) Wayne Grady	Royal Queensland	
Queensland Open
1981	ANZ	(Australia) Garry Doolan	290	+2	2 strokes	(Australia) Richard Lee	Kooralbyn Valley	
1980	ANZ	(Australia) Bill Dunk (4)	279	−9	1 stroke	(New Zealand) Richard Coombes	Pacific	
Dunhill Queensland Open
1979	ANZ	(Australia) Jeff Senior (a)	279	−9	2 strokes	(Australia) Jack Newton	Indooroopilly	
1978	ANZ	(United States) Bob Risch	282	+2	1 stroke	(Australia) Mike Ferguson (Australia) Jack Newton (Australia) Jeff Senior (a)	Brisbane	
Queensland Open
1977	ANZ	(United States) Hal Underwood	281	−7	2 strokes	(Australia) Mike Ferguson (Australia) Peter Headland	Pacific	
1976	ANZ	(Australia) John Dyer	282	−10	3 strokes	(United States) Jim Ahern	Keperra	
1975	ANZ	(Australia) Ian Stanley	281	+1	4 strokes	(Australia) Mike Ferguson	Brisbane	
1974	ANZ	(Australia) Bill Dunk (3)	289		1 stroke	(Australia) John Sheargold	Royal Queensland	
1973		(Australia) Bill Dunk (2)	286	−6	1 stroke	(Australia) David Galloway (Australia) Darrell Welch	Gailes	
1972		(Australia) Bill Dunk	280	−12	1 stroke	(Australia) Stan Peach	Pacific	
1971		(Australia) Vic Bennetts	277		4 strokes	(Australia) Frank Phillips	Indooroopilly	
1970		(New Zealand) Terry Kendall	278		1 stroke	(Australia) Bill Dunk (Australia) Glen McCully	Keperra	
1969		(Australia) Tim Woolbank	278		3 strokes	(Australia) Graham Marsh	Brisbane	
1968		(Australia) Peter Harvey	285		Playoff (Note: Harvey won the 18-hole playoff by 4 strokes.)	(Australia) Col Johnston	Royal Queensland	
1967		(Australia) Sommie Mackay (a)	288		Playoff	(Australia) Errol Hartvigsen	Gailes	
1965–66: No tournament
1964		(Australia) Kel Nagle (2)	278		2 strokes	(Australia) John Hayes (a) (Australia) Sommie Mackay (a)	Keperra	
1963		(Australia) Bruce Devlin	280		Playoff (Note: Devlin won the 18-hole playoff by 8 strokes.)	(Australia) Kel Nagle	Indooroopilly	
1962		(Australia) Ted Ball	282		4 strokes	(Australia) Len Woodward	Gailes	
1961		(Australia) Norman Von Nida (7)	286		Playoff (Note: Von Nida won the 18-hole playoff by 1 stroke.)	(Australia) Bruce Devlin (Australia) Alec Mercer	Royal Queensland	
1960		(Australia) Alan Murray	273		7 strokes	(Australia) Frank Phillips	Keperra	
1959		(Australia) Kel Nagle	283		5 strokes	(Australia) Darrell Welch	Brisbane	
1958		(Australia) Jack Brown	285		1 stroke	(Australia) Jim McInnes (Australia) Kel Nagle	Indooroopilly	
1957		(Australia) Eric Cremin (5)	284		1 stroke	(Australia) Frank Phillips	Royal Queensland	
1956		(Australia) Eric Cremin (4)	294		3 strokes	(Australia) Les Wilson	Brisbane	
1955: No tournament, The Australian Open was held at Gailes
1954		(Australia) Reg Want	287		2 strokes	(Australia) Eric Cremin	Gailes	
1953		(Australia) Norman Von Nida (6)	289		1 stroke	(Australia) Eric Cremin (Australia) Les Wilson	Keperra	
1952		(Australia) Ossie Pickworth (2)	289		Playoff (Note: Pickworth won the 18-hole playoff by 6 strokes.)	(Scotland) Jimmy Adams	Gailes	
1951		(Australia) Ossie Pickworth	282		10 strokes	(Australia) Sid Cowling	Indooroopilly	
1950		(Australia) Eric Cremin (3)	284		4 strokes	(Australia) Kel Nagle	Brisbane	
1949		(Australia) Norman Von Nida (5)	276		5 strokes	(Australia) Ossie Pickworth	Royal Queensland	
1948		(Australia) Eric Cremin (2)	290		4 strokes	(Australia) Doug Bachli (a)	Brisbane	
1947: No tournament, The Australian Open was held at Royal Queensland
1946		(Australia) Eric Cremin	282		19 strokes	(Australia) Alex Colledge (a)	Brisbane	
1941–1945: No tournament due to World War II
1940		(Australia) Norman Von Nida (4)	289		6 strokes	(Australia) Ossie Pickworth	Royal Queensland	
1939		(Australia) Jim Ferrier (a) (3)	290		6 strokes	(Australia) Ossie Walker	Brisbane	
1938		(Australia) Jim Ferrier (a) (2)	284		15 strokes	(Australia) Ossie Walker	Royal Queensland	
1937		(Australia) Norman Von Nida (3)	284		10 strokes	(Australia) Bill Holder	Brisbane	
1936		(Australia) Norman Von Nida (2)	297		6 strokes	(Australia) Alan Waterson (a)	Royal Queensland	
1935		(Australia) Norman Von Nida	294		1 stroke	(Australia) Jim Ferrier (a)	Brisbane	
1934		(Australia) Jim Ferrier (a)	286		10 strokes	(Australia) Alex Denholm (Australia) Ossie Walker	Royal Queensland	
1933		(Australia) Jack Radcliffe (a)	294		1 stroke	(Australia) Charlie Brown (Australia) Ivo Whitton (a)	Brisbane	
1932		(Australia) Charlie Brown	286		1 stroke	(Australia) Tom Howard	Royal Queensland	
1931		(Australia) Harry Sinclair (2)	298		Playoff (Note: Sinclair won the 36-hole playoff by 5 strokes.)	(Australia) Charlie Brown	Brisbane	
1930		(Australia) Frank Eyre	304		Playoff (Note: Eyre won the 36-hole playoff by 10 strokes.)	(Australia) Harry Sinclair	Royal Queensland	
1929		(Australia) Arthur Gazzard	298		Playoff (Note: Gazzard won the 36-hole playoff by 2 strokes.)	(Australia) Dick Carr	Brisbane	
1928		(Australia) Ivo Whitton (a)	296		1 stroke	(Australia) Harry Sinclair	Royal Queensland	
1927		(Australia) Tom Howard	286		5 strokes	(Australia) Jack Radcliffe (a)	Brisbane	
1926		(Australia) Dick Carr	296		4 strokes	(Australia) Frank Eyre	Brisbane	
1925		(Australia) Harry Sinclair (a)	294		7 strokes	(Australia) Dick Carr	Brisbane	
