= Heritage Classic (PGA Tour of Australasia) =

Tournament information
- Location: Chirnside Park, Melbourne, Australia
- Established: 2013
- Course: The Heritage Golf and Country Club
- Par: 72
- Length: 7,200 yards (6,600 m)
- Tour: PGA Tour of Australasia
- Format: Stroke play
- Prize fund: A$250,000
- Month played: March

Tournament record score
- Aggregate: 264 Matthew Griffin (2024)
- To par: −24 as above

Current champion
- (Australia) Will Florimo

Final champion
- Location in Australia Location in Victoria

The Heritage Classic is a professional golf tournament on the PGA Tour of Australasia, played at The Heritage Golf and Country Club in Chirnside Park, Melbourne, Australia.

== History ==
The inaugural event was formed in 2013 as the Lexus of Blackburn Heritage Classic. David Bransdon, Lucas Herbert and Max McCardle tied on 274, but Bransdon won the playoff with a birdie at the first extra hole.

Between 2014 and 2023, the tournament was not played, however returned in January 2024 as part of the 2023–24 PGA Tour of Australasia season.

== Winners ==
Year	Winner	Score	To par	Margin of victory	Runner(s)-up
Heritage Classic
2026	(Australia) Will Florimo	274	−14	2 strokes	(Australia) Haydn Barron
2025	(Australia) James Conran	266	−22	1 stroke	(Australia) Nathan Page
2024	(Australia) Matthew Griffin	264	−24	6 strokes	(Australia) Jak Carter (Australia) Quinnton Croker
2014–2023: No tournament
Lexus of Blackburn Heritage Classic
2013	(Australia) David Bransdon	274	−14	Playoff	(Australia) Lucas Herbert (a) (Australia) Max McCardle
