= Queensland PGA Championship =

Tournament information
- Location: Nudgee, Queensland, Australia
- Established: 1926
- Courses: Nudgee Golf Club (Kurrai Course)
- Par: 72
- Length: 7,046 yards (6,443 m)
- Tours: PGA Tour of Australasia; Von Nida Tour; Australasian Development Tour
- Format: Stroke play
- Prize fund: A$250,000
- Month played: October/November

Tournament record score
- Aggregate: 254 Brad Kennedy (2013)
- To par: −29 Kurt Barnes (2004)
- Score: 9 and 8 Eddie Anderson (1939)

Current champion
- (Australia) Declan O'Donovan

Location map
- Location in Australia Location in Queensland

The Queensland PGA Championship is a golf tournament on the PGA Tour of Australasia. The tournament is currently held at Nudgee Golf Club in Nudgee.

== History ==
The event was founded as the Queensland Professional Championship in 1926. The inaugural championship was played at Brisbane Golf Club in late November with 12 professionals competing. There was a 36-hole stroke-play stage with the leading 4 qualifying for the match-play. The 36-hole semi-finals were played the following day with the 36-hole final on the third day. Arthur Spence, the Royal Queensland professional, beat Jack Quarton, the Toowoomba professional, in the final. In 1927 the number of qualifiers was increased to 8, with the quarter and semi-finals played over 18 holes on the second day. From 1930 the event was extended to four days, with all matches over 36 holes.

Charlie Brown was the most successful golfer before World War II, winning three times in succession from 1930 to 1932. He appeared in 7 finals in a row and 9 finals in all. Ossie Walker was another three-time winner, in 1934, 1936 and 1938. After the war, Reg Want dominated, winning 7 times in 9 years to 1954. He didn't play in one of the other two, losing the other at the quarter-final stage. He won for an eighth time in 1962. Darrell Welch won four times in five years between 1956 and 1960. Since Want's eighth win in 1962, no player has won the event more than twice.

The championship has been a PGA Tour of Australasia event since 2009 and has been held at City Golf Club in Toowoomba during that period.

No tournament was played in 2021, but the tournament returned in 2022 with a change of venue to Nudgee Golf Club in Nudgee.

Notable former winners of the event include major champions David Graham, Greg Norman and Ian Baker-Finch. In addition, 2015 PGA champion Jason Day narrowly lost out in a playoff in the 2005 event when it was part of the Von Nida Tour.

== Winners ==
Year	Tour (Note: ANZ − PGA Tour of Australasia; ANZDT − Australasian Development Tour; FT − Foundation Tour; VNT − Von Nida Tour.)	Winner	Score	To par	Margin of victory	Runner(s)-up	Venue	Ref.
Queensland PGA Championship
2026	ANZ	(Australia) Declan O'Donovan	268	−20	2 strokes	(Australia) Daniel Gale (Australia) Cameron John (Australia) Curtis Luck	Nudgee	
2025	ANZ	(Australia) Cameron John	271	−17	2 strokes	(Australia) Billy Dowling (a)	Nudgee	
2024	ANZ	(Australia) Phoenix Campbell (2)	277	−11	Playoff	(Australia) Jak Carter	Nudgee	
2023	ANZ	(Australia) Phoenix Campbell (a)	279	−9	1 stroke	(Australia) Harrison Crowe (Australia) Lawry Flynn (Australia) Deyen Lawson (Australia) David Micheluzzi (Australia) Jack Pountney (Australia) Blake Proverbs (New Zealand) Nick Voke	Nudgee	
QLD PGA Championship
2022 (Nov)	ANZ	(Australia) Aaron Wilkin	284	−4	Playoff	(Australia) Justin Warren	Nudgee	
Queensland PGA Championship
2022 (Jan)	ANZ	(Australia) Anthony Quayle	276	−12	2 strokes	(Australia) Daniel Gale	Nudgee	
2021: No tournament
Coca-Cola Queensland PGA Championship
2020	ANZ	(Australia) Michael Sim	268	−12	Playoff	(Australia) Scott Arnold	City	
2019	ANZ	(Australia) Daniel Nisbet	256	−24	6 strokes	(Australia) Harrison Endycott (Australia) Deyen Lawson	City	
2018	ANZ	(Australia) Daniel Fox	262	−18	1 stroke	(Australia) Steven Jeffress (Australia) Matthew Millar	City	
2017	ANZ	(New Zealand) Daniel Pearce	261	−19	Playoff	(Australia) Matthew Millar	City	
2016	ANZ	(Germany) David Klein	265	−15	Playoff	(Australia) Tim Hart	City	
2015	ANZ	(New Zealand) Ryan Fox	263	−17	1 stroke	(Australia) Matthew Millar (Australia) Cameron Smith	City	
2014	ANZ	(Australia) Anthony Summers	256	−24	3 strokes	(New Zealand) Ryan Fox	City	
2013	ANZ	(Australia) Brad Kennedy	254	−18	2 strokes	(New Zealand) Michael Hendry	City	
2012	ANZ	(Australia) Andrew Tschudin	199 (Note: Shortened to 54 holes due to weather.)	−11	1 stroke	(Australia) Andrew Martin (Australia) Brody Ninyette	City	
Cellarbrations Queensland PGA Championship
2011	ANZ	(New Zealand) Gareth Paddison	262	−18	2 strokes	(Australia) Terry Pilkadaris (Australia) Kieran Pratt	City	
Queensland PGA Championship
2010		(Australia) Peter Senior	incorporated into the Australian PGA Championship					
Cellarbrations Queensland PGA Championship
2009	ANZ	(Australia) Steven Bowditch	260	−20	6 strokes	(Australia) Clint Rice	City	
Queensland PGA Championship
2008	~~VNT~~	(Australia) Darren Beck	incorporated into the Callaway Hi-Lite Pro-Am					
Greater Building Society Queensland PGA Championship
2007	VNT	(Australia) Andrew Bonhomme	261	−23	2 strokes	(Australia) Darren Beck (Australia) Michael Curtain	Emerald Lakes	
Greater Building Society QLD PGA Championship
2006	VNT	(Australia) Cameron Percy	264	−20	2 strokes	(Australia) Michael Brennan (Australia) Aaron Townsend	Emerald Lakes	
2005	VNT	(Australia) Scott Gardiner	261	−23	Playoff	(Australia) Jason Day (a)	Emerald Lakes	
Toyota Queensland PGA Championship
2004	VNT	(Australia) Kurt Barnes	259	−29	1 stroke	(Australia) Gary Simpson	Emerald Lakes	
Queensland PGA Championship
2003	VNT	(Australia) David Diaz	266	−22	Playoff	(Australia) Aaron Townsend	Emerald Lakes	
2002	ANZ	(Australia) Andre Stolz	266	−22	2 strokes	(Australia) Paul Sheehan	Gold Coast	
2001	ANZDT	(Australia) Anthony Painter	268	−20	5 strokes	(Australia) Scott Gardiner	Gold Coast	
2000		(Australia) Nathan Green						
1999	FT	(Australia) Jon Riley	267	−21	Playoff	(Australia) Craig Jones	Gold Coast	
1998	FT	(Australia) Lucas Parsons (2)	273	−15	3 strokes	(Australia) Terry Price	Gold Coast	
1997	FT	(Australia) Lucas Parsons	276	−12	Playoff	(Australia) Brad Andrews (Australia) John Senden	Gold Coast	
1996	FT	(Australia) David Ecob	210	−6	1 stroke	(New Zealand) Elliot Boult (Australia) Darren Cole (Australia) Anthony Summers	Gold Coast	
1995	FT	(Australia) Tod Power	281	−7	2 strokes	(Australia) Tony Carolan (England) Matthew King (Australia) Lucien Tinkler	Gold Coast	
1994	~~ANZ~~, FT	(Australia) Robert Stephens	273	−15	4 strokes	(Australia) Lucien Tinkler	McLeod	
1993	FT	(Australia) Chris Taylor	285		1 stroke	(Australia) Anthony Painter	Paradise Springs	
1992		(Australia) Ossie Moore (2)	271	−17	3 strokes	(Australia) Terry Price	Gainsborough Greens	
1991		(United States) Wayne Case	282	−6	2 strokes	(Australia) Mike Sprengel	Gainsborough Greens	
1990		(Australia) Terry Price (2)	275	−13	4 strokes	(United States) Mike Colandro	Gainsborough Greens	
1989		(Australia) Zoran Zorkic	277	−11	1 stroke	(Australia) Terry Price	Howeston	
1988		(Australia) Terry Price	275		Playoff	(Australia) Robert Stephens	Toowoomba	
1987	ANZ	(Australia) Peter Senior	278	−10	Playoff	(Australia) Jeff Woodland	Pacific	
Fourex Queensland PGA Championship
1986	ANZ	(Australia) Ossie Moore	277	−11	10 strokes	(Australia) Brett Ogle (Australia) Peter Senior	Indooroopilly	
Queensland PGA Championship
1985	ANZ	(Australia) Peter Fowler	277	−7	1 stroke	(United States) Keith Parker (Australia) Wayne Riley	Brisbane	
Coca-Cola Queensland PGA Championship
1984	ANZ	(Australia) Ian Baker-Finch	285	−3	1 stroke	(Australia) Ossie Moore	Royal Queensland	
Queensland PGA Championship
1983	ANZ	(Australia) Peter McWhinney	283	−5	2 strokes	(Australia) Ossie Moore	Royal Queensland	
1982	ANZ	(Australia) Paul Foley	288	E	Playoff	(Australia) Peter Fowler	Royal Queensland	
1981		(Australia) Mike Ferguson	285	−3	3 strokes	(Australia) Bob Shaw	Royal Queensland	
1980		(Australia) John Victorsen	288	E	1 stroke	(Australia) Bryan Smith	Royal Queensland	
1979	ANZ	(Australia) Greg Norman	285	−7	8 strokes		Royal Queensland	
1978		(Australia) Allan Cooper						
1977		(Australia) Bryan Smith						
1976		(Australia) Randall Vines (2)						
1975		(Australia) Errol Hartvigsen (2)	284	E	9 strokes	(Australia) John Dyer	Brisbane	
1974		(Australia) John Klatt (2)						
1973		(Australia) Randall Vines						
1972		(Australia) Peter Barry						
1971		(Australia) Errol Hartvigsen						
1970		(Australia) John Klatt						
1969		(Australia) Bobby Gibson (2)						
1968		(Australia) Ted Ball						
1967		(Australia) David Graham						
1966		(Australia) Les Wilson						
1965		(Australia) Bobby Gibson						
1964		(Australia) John Collins (2)						
1963		(Australia) Jack Brown (2)						
1962		(Australia) Reg Want (8)						
1961		(Australia) Len Thomas						
1960		(Australia) Darrell Welch (4)						
1959		(Australia) Darrell Welch (3)						
1958		(Australia) Darrell Welch (2)						
1957		(Australia) John Collins						
1956		(Australia) Darrell Welch						
1955		(Australia) Doug Katterns	5 and 4			(Australia) Reg Want		
1954		(Australia) Reg Want (7)	3 and 2			(Australia) Jack Brown	Keperra	
1953		(Australia) Jack Brown	2 and 1			(Australia) Fred Anderson	Gailes	
1952		(Australia) Reg Want (6)	2 and 1			(Australia) Murray Crafter	Royal Queensland	
1951		(Australia) Reg Want (5)	3 and 2			(Australia) Jack Brown	Indooroopilly	
1950		(Australia) Jim McInnes	4 and 3			(Australia) Jack Downs	Brisbane	
1949		(Australia) Reg Want (4)	1 up			(Australia) Ossie Walker	Indooroopilly	
1948		(Australia) Reg Want (3)	4 and 3			(Australia) Ossie Walker	Toowoomba	
1947		(Australia) Reg Want (2)	4 and 3			(Australia) Ossie Walker	Brisbane	
1946		(Australia) Reg Want	3 and 1			(Australia) Eddie Anderson	Peninsula	
1940–1945: No tournament due to World War II
1939		(Australia) Eddie Anderson (2)	9 and 8			(Australia) Charlie Brown	Brisbane	
1938		(Australia) Ossie Walker (3)	9 and 7			(Australia) Eddie Anderson	Royal Queensland	
1937		(Australia) Eddie Anderson	4 and 2			(Australia) Ossie Walker	Gailes	
1936		(Australia) Ossie Walker (2)	6 and 4			(Australia) Charlie Brown	Victoria Park	
1935		(Australia) Arthur Gazzard (2)	4 and 2			(Australia) Eddie Anderson	Indooroopilly	
1934		(Australia) Ossie Walker	7 and 5			(Australia) Charlie Brown	Brisbane	
1933		(Australia) Arthur Gazzard	2 and 1			(Australia) Charlie Brown	Royal Queensland	
1932		(Australia) Charlie Brown (3)	1 up			(Australia) Jack Quarton	Brisbane	
1931		(Australia) Charlie Brown (2)	1 up			(Australia) Joe Cohen	Royal Queensland	
1930		(Australia) Charlie Brown	2 and 1			(Australia) Tom Southcombe	Brisbane	
1929		(Australia) Jack Quarton	4 and 3			(Australia) Charlie Brown	Royal Queensland	
1928		(Australia) Alex Denholm	2 and 1			(Australia) Charlie Brown	Brisbane	
1927		(Australia) Dick Carr	4 and 3			(Australia) Arthur Spence	Royal Queensland	
1926		(Australia) Arthur Spence	2 and 1			(Australia) Jack Quarton	Brisbane	

== Multiple winners ==
Sixteen players have won this tournament more than once through 2020.

- 8 wins
  - Reg Want: 1946, 1947, 1948, 1949, 1951, 1952, 1954, 1962
- 4 wins
  - Darrell Welch: 1956, 1958, 1959, 1960
- 3 wins
  - Charlie Brown: 1930, 1931, 1932
  - Ossie Walker: 1934, 1936, 1938
- 2 wins
  - Arthur Gazzard: 1933, 1935
  - Eddie Anderson: 1937, 1939
  - Jack Brown: 1953, 1963
  - John Collins: 1957, 1964
  - Bobby Gibson: 1965, 1969
  - John Klatt: 1970, 1974
  - Errol Hartvigsen: 1971, 1975
  - Randall Vines: 1973, 1976
  - Terry Price: 1988, 1990
  - Ossie Moore: 1986, 1992
  - Lucas Parsons: 1997, 1998
  - Peter Senior: 1987, 2010
