= Golf at the 2024 Summer Olympics – Qualification =

This article details the qualifying phase for golf at the 2024 Summer Olympics. Sixty players for each of the men's and women's tournaments qualified for Paris 2024, based on the official IGF world ranking list of 17 June 2024 (for men) and 24 June 2024 (for women). The top 15 world-ranked golf players were selected by name and secured their Olympic places, respecting the four-player limit per National Olympic Committee (NOC). The remaining spots were awarded to the players ranked beyond the top fifteen on the list with a maximum of two per NOC. The IGF guaranteed that at least one golfer qualified from the host nation and at least one from each continent (Africa, the Americas, Asia, Europe, and Oceania). The IGF posted weekly lists of qualifiers based on current rankings for men and women.

Points were awarded to the players based on their final positions in each event, with performances in the events with stronger fields earning more points, based on a points distribution schedule approved by the IGF. Ranking points for each player accumulated over a two-year “rolling” period with the points awarded in the most recent thirteen-week period weighted at a full percentage of their original value. After the initial 13-week period, the points were devalued by 1.1% for each of the next 91 weeks before they dropped entirely off the player's two-year record. The IGF Olympic ranking was ordered according to the average points that the players managed to accumulate over the applicable two-year period. Calculating the average points was to divide the total number of ranking points accumulated by the player in the number of tournaments in which he or she has competed during the two-year period.

== Qualification summary ==
The following summarized the NOCs qualified for the Olympic golf tournament with the amount of golfers qualified per country.

NOC	Men	Women	Total
Argentina	2		2
Australia	2	2	4
Austria	1	2	3
Belgium	2	1	3
Canada	2	2	4
Chile	2		2
China	2	2	4
Chinese Taipei	2	2	4
Colombia	2	1	3
Czech Republic		2	2
Denmark	2	2	4
Finland	2	2	4
France	2	2	4
Germany	2	2	4
Great Britain	2	2	4
India	2	2	4
Ireland	2	2	4
Italy	2	1	3
Japan	2	2	4
Malaysia	1	1	2
Mexico	2	2	4
Morocco		1	1
Netherlands		1	1
New Zealand	2	1	3
Norway	2	2	4
Paraguay	1		1
Philippines		2	2
Poland	1		1
Puerto Rico	1		1
Singapore		1	1
Slovenia		2	2
South Africa	2	2	4
South Korea	2	3	5
Spain	2	2	4
Sweden	2	2	4
Switzerland	1	2	3
Thailand	2	2	4
United States	4	3	7
Total: 38 NOCs	60	60	120

== Qualified players ==
=== Men ===
Final rankings: June 17, 2024
Rank	Name	Country	World ranking
1	Scottie Scheffler	United States	1
2	Rory McIlroy	Ireland	2
3	Xander Schauffele	United States	3
4	Ludvig Åberg	Sweden	4
5	Wyndham Clark	United States	5
6	Viktor Hovland	Norway	6
7	Collin Morikawa	United States	7
8	Jon Rahm	Spain	9
9	Hideki Matsuyama	Japan	12
10	Tommy Fleetwood	Great Britain	13
11	Matt Fitzpatrick	Great Britain	18
12	Matthieu Pavon	France	20
13	Sepp Straka	Austria	21
14	Jason Day	Australia	24
15	Tom Kim	South Korea	26
16	An Byeong-hun	South Korea	27
17	Shane Lowry	Ireland	33
18	Nick Taylor	Canada	35
19	Min Woo Lee	Australia	36
20	Corey Conners	Canada	37
21	Christiaan Bezuidenhout	South Africa	40
22	Stephan Jäger	Germany	42
23	Nicolai Højgaard	Denmark	44
24	Thomas Detry	Belgium	48
25	Emiliano Grillo	Argentina	52
26	Alex Norén	Sweden	55
27	Ryan Fox	New Zealand	59
28	Erik van Rooyen	South Africa	67
29	Adrian Meronk	Poland	73
30	Victor Perez	France	78
31	Keita Nakajima	Japan	83
32	Thorbjørn Olesen	Denmark	85
33	Alejandro Tosti	Argentina	98
34	Joaquín Niemann	Chile	99
35	Sami Välimäki	Finland	100
36	Kevin Yu	Chinese Taipei	108
37	David Puig	Spain	113
38	Matti Schmid	Germany	134
39	Pan Cheng-tsung	Chinese Taipei	140
40	Yuan Yechun	China	155
41	Camilo Villegas	Colombia	177
42	Matteo Manassero	Italy	180
43	Adrien Dumont de Chassart	Belgium	187
44	Daniel Hillier	New Zealand	190
45	Guido Migliozzi	Italy	198
46	Shubhankar Sharma	India	219
47	Rafael Campos	Puerto Rico	221
48	Carlos Ortiz	Mexico	240
49	Kiradech Aphibarnrat	Thailand	242
50	Gavin Green	Malaysia	257
51	Gaganjeet Bhullar	India	261
52	Nico Echavarría	Colombia	269
53	Mito Pereira	Chile	272
54	Kristoffer Ventura	Norway	281
55	Phachara Khongwatmai	Thailand	287
56	Abraham Ancer	Mexico	312
57	Dou Zecheng	China	338
58	Fabrizio Zanotti	Paraguay	343
59	Joel Girrbach	Switzerland	366
60	Tapio Pulkkanen	Finland	378

- Rico Hoey (ranked 173) was ineligible to compete for the Philippines due to his changing his allegiance from the United States too late in the qualification process.
- Chile's Cristóbal del Solar (ranked 195) withdrew after the final rankings were released and was replaced by Mito Pereira.
- The Dutch Olympic Committee did not allow Joost Luiten (ranked 147) and Darius van Driel (237) to participate since they required their participants to be ranked in the top 27 of the Olympic Golf Ranking and have "a realistic chance at a medal". Luiten initially appealed against the Dutch Olympic Committee for prohibiting him to play, considering that he was eligible. He won the appeal. However, Luiten was denied access to play due to his initial entry being removed by the Dutch Olympic Committee and his place being taken by Tapio Pulkkanen.
- Several golfers requested that they be withdrawn from consideration for the games:
  - Tyrrell Hatton (Great Britain) – ranked 22
  - Brooks Koepka (United States) – 43
  - Adam Scott (Australia) – 58
  - Louis Oosthuizen (South Africa) – 138
  - Marcel Siem (Germany) – 215
  - Thomas Pieters (Belgium) – 333
  - Bernd Wiesberger (Austria) – 246

=== Women ===
Final rankings: June 24, 2024
Rank	Name	Country	World ranking
1	Nelly Korda	United States	1
2	Lilia Vu	United States	2
3	Ko Jin-young	South Korea	3
4	Yin Ruoning	China	4
5	Amy Yang	South Korea	5
6	Céline Boutier	France	6
7	Hannah Green	Australia	7
8	Charley Hull	Great Britain	8
9	Rose Zhang	United States	9
10	Yuka Saso	Japan	10
11	Minjee Lee	Australia	11
12	Atthaya Thitikul	Thailand	12
13	Kim Hyo-joo	South Korea	13
14	Brooke Henderson	Canada	14
15	Lin Xiyu	China	15
16	Lydia Ko	New Zealand	17
17	Miyū Yamashita	Japan	19
18	Maja Stark	Sweden	21
19	Patty Tavatanakit	Thailand	25
20	Linn Grant	Sweden	26
21	Carlota Ciganda	Spain	30
22	Leona Maguire	Ireland	32
23	Georgia Hall	Great Britain	36
24	Ashleigh Buhai	South Africa	41
25	Aditi Ashok	India	60
26	Gaby López	Mexico	62
27	Esther Henseleit	Germany	64
28	Alexandra Försterling	Germany	69
29	Albane Valenzuela	Switzerland	70
30	Perrine Delacour	France	75
31	Emily Kristine Pedersen	Denmark	87
32	Pei-Yun Chien	Chinese Taipei	88
33	Nanna Koerstz Madsen	Denmark	106
34	Anne Van Dam	Netherlands	108
35	Azahara Muñoz	Spain	109
36	Bianca Pagdanganan	Philippines	113
37	Morgane Métraux	Switzerland	127
38	Stephanie Meadow	Ireland	134
39	Manon De Roey	Belgium	154
40	Hsu Wei-ling	Chinese Taipei	161
41	Diksha Dagar	India	167
42	Emma Spitz	Austria	178
43	Shannon Tan	Singapore	181
44	María Fassi	Mexico	186
45	Celine Borge	Norway	187
46	Klára Spilková	Czech Republic	192
47	Paula Reto	South Africa	196
48	Mariajo Uribe	Colombia	198
49	Alessandra Fanali	Italy	211
50	Ashley Lau	Malaysia	279
51	Ursula Wikström	Finland	286
52	Ana Belac	Slovenia	288
53	Sára Kousková	Czech Republic	290
54	Alena Sharp	Canada	292
55	Dottie Ardina	Philippines	298
56	Noora Komulainen	Finland	301
57	Madelene Stavnar	Norway	307
58	Ines Laklalech	Morocco	321
59	Sarah Schober	Austria	330
60	Pia Babnik	Slovenia	336

- The Dutch Olympic Committee did not allow Dewi Weber (ranked 302) to participate since they required their participants to be ranked in the top 24 of the world ranking. Anne Van Dam (108) was allowed to compete after meeting other Dutch OC requirements.
- The New Zealand Olympic Committee did not allow Momoka Kobori (ranked 293) to participate.
- Nataliya Guseva (ranked 163) was ineligible due to Russia's ban from the games.
