= Matthew Millar =

Matthew Millar may refer to:

- Matthew Millar (golfer)
- Matthew Millar (soccer)
