= Kazuma Kobori =

New Zealand golfer (born 2001)

Personal information
- Nationality: New Zealand
- Born: 25 October 2001 (age 25) Karuizawa, Japan

Career
- Sport: Golf
- Turned professional: 2023
- Current tours: European Tour; PGA Tour of Australasia
- Former tour: Charles Tour
- Professional wins: 5

Number of wins by tour
- PGA Tour of Australasia: 4
- Other: 1

Best results in major championships
- Masters Tournament: DNP
- PGA Championship: CUT: 2024
- U.S. Open: DNP
- The Open Championship: T28: 2026

Achievements and awards
- PGA Tour of Australasia Order of Merit winner: 2023–24
- PGA Tour of Australasia Player of the Year: 2023–24
- PGA Tour of Australasia Rookie of the Year: 2023–24

Kazuma Kobori (born 25 October 2001) is a New Zealand professional golfer. He won the 2019 New Zealand PGA Championship as an amateur, as well as the individual title at the 2023 Eisenhower Trophy.

== Early life ==
In 2001, Kobori was born in Karuizawa, Japan. He moved to Canterbury, New Zealand, with his family when he was six.

Kobori was educated at Rangiora High School.

== Amateur career ==
In 2019, Kobori was runner-up at the Australian Boys' Amateur. He won the SEC NZ PGA Championship on the PGA Tour of Australasia and was runner-up at the Carrus Open on the Charles Tour.

In 2023, Kobori cemented his position as New Zealand's top male amateur golfer. He won the Australian Amateur two strokes ahead of Arron Edwards-Hill of England. He also won the Western Amateur at North Shore Country Club near Chicago, an Elite Amateur Series championship, and captured the individual honors at the Eisenhower Trophy in Abu Dhabi. He was only the second New Zealander to win the individual title following Phil Tataurangi in 1992. He claimed an early lead at the Asia-Pacific Amateur Championship and ultimately finished 6th.

Kobori started in five events on the 2023 PGA Tour of Australasia as an amateur and recorded three top-10s, including a tie for 6th at the New Zealand Open. He was awarded the Bledisloe Cup as the leading amateur. He turned professional after finishing sixth at the Asia-Pacific Amateur Championship in Melbourne.

== Professional career ==
In November 2023, Kobori made his professional debut at the Queensland PGA Championship on the PGA Tour of Australasia where he finished in a tie for 9th, two strokes behind winner Phoenix Campbell. At the start of 2024, Kobori won three consecutive WebEx Players Series tournaments, claiming the Order of Merit, as well as being awarded with Player of the Year and Rookie of the Year honours.

== Personal life ==
His older sister, Momoka, is also a golfer.

== Amateur wins ==
- 2017 Boys Championship of Victoria
- 2018 Southland 54 Hole Strokeplay Championship, Boys Championship of Victoria
- 2019 Canterbury Men's Stroke Play Championship, South Island Stroke Play Championship,
- 2021 Southland 54 Hole Strokeplay Championship, Otago Strokeplay Championship, South Island Stroke Play Championship
- 2022 Otago Strokeplay Championship, Canterbury Stroke Play, Muriwai Open
- 2023 Australian Amateur, Western Amateur, Eisenhower Trophy (individual medalist)

== Professional wins (5) ==
=== PGA Tour of Australasia wins (4) ===
No.	Date	Tournament	Winning score	Margin of victory	Runner-up
1	10 Mar 2019	SEC NZ PGA Championship (as an amateur)	−21 (67-65-66-69=267)	4 strokes	(New Zealand) David Smail
2	21 Jan 2024	Webex Players Series Murray River^{1}	−21 (65-66-64-68=263)	2 strokes	(Singapore) Shannon Tan
3	28 Jan 2024	Webex Players Series Victoria^{1}	−18 (66-66-65-69=266)	1 stroke	(Malaysia) Ashley Lau
4	11 Feb 2024	Webex Players Series Sydney^{1}	−24 (65-64-69-66=264)	1 stroke	(South Korea) Jenny Shin

^{1}Mixed event with the WPGA Tour of Australasia

=== Charles Tour wins (1) ===
No.	Date	Tournament	Winning score	Margin of victory	Runner-up
1	24 Apr 2022	Autex Muriwai Open (as an amateur)	−10 (66-65-69-68=278)	4 strokes	(New Zealand) Harry Bateman

== Results in major championships ==
Tournament	2024	2025	2026
Masters Tournament			
PGA Championship	CUT		
U.S. Open			
The Open Championship	CUT		T28

Did not play

CUT = missed the halfway cut

== Team appearances ==
Amateur

- Nomura Cup (representing New Zealand): 2022
- Eisenhower Trophy (representing New Zealand): 2022, 2023
