= Aaron Pike (golfer) =

Australian professional golfer (born 1985)

Personal information
- Nationality: Australia
- Born: 11 November 1985 (age 40) Karratha, Western Australia

Career
- Sport: Golf
- College: Hills International College
- Turned professional: 2007
- Current tour: PGA Tour of Australasia
- Professional wins: 3

Number of wins by tour
- PGA Tour of Australasia: 2
- Other: 1

Best results in major championships
- Masters Tournament: DNP
- PGA Championship: DNP
- U.S. Open: DNP
- The Open Championship: CUT: 2021

Aaron Pike (born 11 November 1985) is an Australian professional golfer who plays on the PGA Tour of Australasia. He won the 2018 Victorian PGA Championship and 2020 Northern Territory PGA Championship.

== Early life and amateur career ==
Pike was born in Karratha, Western Australia and moved to Darwin, Northern Territory as a 7-year old. In 2003, at 17, he moved to Jimboomba just south of Brisbane to attend Hills International College, where he was a schoolmate of Jason Day.

In 2006, Pike won the Victorian Amateur Championship and qualified for the Australian Masters at Huntingdale Golf Club, a European Tour event, where he finished solo 4th three strokes behind winner Justin Rose.

== Professional career ==
Pike turned professional in 2007 but did not join the PGA Tour of Australasia until 2012 as his career was plagued by injury, including requiring a shoulder reconstruction in 2010. He also experienced nerve damage in the back, and in 2019 he had a recurring tennis elbow injury to fight.

Pike was runner-up in the 2016 Western Australia PGA Championship, and his breakthrough came in 2018 when he won the Victorian PGA Championship at Cape Schanck on the Mornington Peninsula.

In 2019, he held the co-lead with Keegan Bradley at the Emirates Australian Open and ultimately tied for 3rd, which earned him a start in the 2021 Open Championship at Royal St George's Golf Club.

Pike won his second title at the 2020 Northern Territory PGA Championship, and a third after a playoff with Momoka Kobori at TPS Hunter Valley in 2021, to finish 5th in the 2021–22 PGA Tour of Australasia Order of Merit.

== Amateur wins ==
- 2006 Victorian Amateur Championship

== Professional wins (3) ==
=== PGA Tour of Australasia wins (2) ===
No.	Date	Tournament	Winning score	To par	Margin of victory	Runner-up
1	14 Oct 2018	Victorian PGA Championship	71-65-66-68=270	−10	1 stroke	(New Zealand) Ryan Chisnall
2	12 Mar 2022	TPS Hunter Valley	68-62-70=200	−8	Playoff	(New Zealand) Momoka Kobori

PGA Tour of Australasia playoff record (1–0)

No.	Year	Tournament	Opponent	Result
1	2022	TPS Hunter Valley	(New Zealand) Momoka Kobori	Won with birdie on third extra hole

=== Other wins (1) ===
No.	Date	Tournament	Winning score	To par	Margin of victory	Runner-up
1	25 Oct 2020	Tailor-made Building Services NT PGA Championship	68-66-67=201	−12	Playoff	(Australia) Michael Sim

Other playoff record (1–0)

No.	Year	Tournament	Opponent	Result
1	2020	Tailor-made Building Services NT PGA Championship	(Australia) Michael Sim	Won with par on first extra hole

== Results in major championships ==
Tournament	2021
Masters Tournament	
PGA Championship	
U.S. Open	
The Open Championship	CUT

Did not play

CUT = missed the half-way cut
