= Cameron John (golfer) =

Australian professional golfer (born 1999)

Personal information
- Nationality: Australia
- Born: 27 April 1999 (age 27)

Career
- Sport: Golf
- Turned professional: 2018
- Current tours: PGA Tour of Australasia; Asian Tour; European Tour
- Former tour: PGA Tour Canada
- Professional wins: 4

Number of wins by tour
- PGA Tour of Australasia: 4

Best results in major championships
- Masters Tournament: DNP
- PGA Championship: DNP
- U.S. Open: DNP
- The Open Championship: T28: 2026

Cameron John (born 27 April 1999) is an Australian professional golfer. He has won four times on the PGA Tour of Australasia.

== Early life and amateur career ==
John was born in 1999 and grew up in the outer Melbourne suburb of Ferntree Gully, where he learned the game at Commonwealth Golf Club, after his grandfather introduced him to golf.

John enjoyed early success as an amateur. At 15, he won the Victorian Amateur Championship, and the next year the Scottish Amateur Stroke Play Championship, followed by the Australian Boys' Amateur. He made his debut in a professional tournament at the 2015 Victorian Open, where he made the cut. In 2017, he made the cut at both the Australian Open and Korea Open.

John attended Rowville Secondary College as a member of the Rowville Sports Academy's Golf program.

== Professional career ==
John turned professional in January 2018, at 18, and joined the PGA Tour of Australasia. In his rookie season, he was runner-up at the New South Wales Open, two strokes behind Jake McLeod. In 2019, he was solo 3rd at the New Zealand PGA Championship, and in 2021, tied 3rd at the Victorian PGA Championship, where he equaled the course record of 62 at Moonah Links.

John enjoyed a breakthrough in 2024 when he won the end-of-season The National Tournament, a title he captured again two years later as one of three wins in the 2025–26 season, where he narrowly finished second on the Order of Merit behind Travis Smyth. By finishing second in the Order of Merit, he earned status on the Challenge Tour.

He was runner-up at the 2026 Singapore Open, an International Series event, which earned him a start in his first major, the 2026 Open Championship.

== Amateur wins ==
- 2015 Victorian Junior Masters, Tasmanian Junior Masters, Victorian Amateur Championship, Campeonato Argentino de Aficionados Copa FiberCorp
- 2016 Scottish Amateur Stroke Play Championship
- 2017 Australian Boys' Amateur

== Professional wins (4) ==
=== PGA Tour of Australasia wins (4) ===
No.	Date	Tournament	Winning score	Margin of victory	Runner-up
1	17 Mar 2024	The National Tournament	−16 (66-70-67-69=272)	3 strokes	(Australia) Daniel Gale
2	23 Nov 2025	Queensland PGA Championship	−17 (67-70-68-66=271)	2 strokes	(Australia) Billy Dowling (a)
3	18 Jan 2026	Vic Open	−8 (68-71-70-71=280)	Playoff	(Australia) Nathan Barbieri
4	29 Mar 2026	The National Tournament (2)	−11 (73-70-66-68=277)	Playoff	(Australia) Daniel Gale

PGA Tour of Australasia playoff record (2–1)

No.	Year	Tournament	Opponent	Result
1	2026	Webex Players Series Victoria	(Australia) Jordan Doull	Lost to birdie on fourth extra hole
2	2026	Vic Open	(Australia) Nathan Barbieri	Won with birdie on first extra hole
3	2026	The National Tournament	(Australia) Daniel Gale	Won with birdie on first extra hole

== Results in major championships ==
Tournament	2026
Masters Tournament	
PGA Championship	
U.S. Open	
The Open Championship	T28

Did not play

CUT = missed the half-way cut
"T" = tied

== Team appearances ==
Amateur

- Sloan Morpeth Trophy (representing Australia): 2016 (winners)
- Australian Boys' Interstate Teams Matches (representing Victoria): 2016, 2017
- Australian Men's Interstate Teams Matches (representing Victoria): 2016, 2017 (winners)

== See also ==
- 2026 European Tour Qualifying School graduates
