= Australian Master of the Amateurs =

Tournament information
- Location: Keysborough, Victoria (2024)
- Established: 1997
- Course: Southern Golf Club (2024)
- Format: 72-hole stroke play
- Month played: January

Current champion
- Phoenix Campbell and Rianne Malixi

The Australian Master of the Amateurs is an amateur golf tournament. It is a four-day 72-hole stroke play event held in early January. The men's event started in 1997 with the women's event added in 2018.

The event was originally called the Master of the Amateurs and was held in Queensland from its founding in 1997 until 2000. After missing a year in 2001 the event relocated to Melbourne, Victoria. It has been held at Yarra Yarra, Royal Melbourne and Victoria. Southern Golf Club hosted the event for the first time in 2023.

== Winners ==
=== Men ===
Year	Winner	Score	To par	Margin of victory	Runner(s)-up	Venue	Ref.
Australian Master of the Amateurs
2026	(Australia) Abel Eduard	275	−13	2 strokes	(Australia) Harry Takis	Southern	
2025	(United States) Ian Gilligan	274	−14	1 stroke	(Australia) Kai Komulainen	Southern	
2024	(Australia) Phoenix Campbell	276	−12	1 stroke	(Australia) Siddharth Nadimpalli	Southern	
2023	(England) John Gough	273	−15	4 strokes	(Scotland) Gregor Tait	Southern	
2022	(Australia) Harrison Crowe	282	−6	1 stroke	(Australia) Konrad Ciupek (Australia) Andre Lautee	Victoria	
2021	(Australia) Lukas Michel	282	−6	2 strokes	(Australia) Ryan Thomas	Victoria	
2020	(United States) Sahith Theegala	278	−10	4 strokes	(South Korea) Lee Jang-hyun	Victoria	
2019	(Taiwan) Kevin Yu	282	−6	Playoff	(Japan) Keita Nakajima	Royal Melbourne	
2018	(Australia) David Micheluzzi	270	−18	5 strokes	(United States) Shintaro Ban (Australia) Darcy Brereton	Royal Melbourne	
2017	(Australia) Charlie Dann	280	−8	Playoff	(Australia) Zach Murray	Royal Melbourne	
2016	(United States) Aaron Wise	283	−5	2 strokes	(England) Jonathan Thomson	Royal Melbourne	
2015	(Australia) Zach Murray	276	−12	2 strokes	(Australia) Cory Crawford	Royal Melbourne	
2014	(Australia) Simon Viitakangas	282	−6	2 strokes	(Australia) Todd Sinnott	Royal Melbourne	
2013	(Australia) Viraat Badhwar	279	−9	2 strokes	(Australia) Brady Watt	Royal Melbourne	
2012	(Australia) Nathan Holman	278	−10	5 strokes	(Australia) Daniel Nisbet	Royal Melbourne	
2011	(Australia) Tarquin MacManus	276	−12	3 strokes	(New Zealand) Ryan Fox (Australia) Ryan McCarthy (England) Andy Sullivan	Royal Melbourne	
Master of the Amateurs
2010	(Australia) Jordan Sherratt	284	−4	Playoff	(United States) Bud Cauley	Yarra Yarra	
2009	(United States) Mark Anderson	284	−4	Playoff	(United States) Rickie Fowler	Yarra Yarra	
2008	(Australia) Toby Wilcox	286	−2	2 strokes	(Australia) Josh Younger	Yarra Yarra	
2007	(Australia) Ashley Umbers	284	−4	2 strokes	(Australia) Ryan McCarthy (Australia) Daniel Popovic	Yarra Yarra	
2006	(Australia) Jason Day	281	−7	2 strokes	(Australia) Matthew Griffin	Yarra Yarra	
2005	(Australia) Ashley Hall	280	−8	1 stroke	(Australia) Jason Day	Yarra Yarra	
2004	(Australia) Andrew Tampion	280	−8	1 stroke	(Australia) Marc Leishman	Yarra Yarra	
2003	(Australia) Heath D'Altera	287	−1	10 strokes	(Australia) Troy Cox	Yarra Yarra	
2002	(Australia) Ben Meyers	281	−7	8 strokes	(Australia) Alistair Presnell (Australia) Kane Streat	Yarra Yarra	
2001	Not held						
2000	(Australia) Chee Huat Choong	309	+21	1 stroke	(Australia) Adrian Garnett	Lakelands	
1999	(Australia) Brendan Jones	216	E	17 strokes	(Australia) Justin Woodcock	Lakelands	
1998	(Australia) Jim Stone	154	+10	Playoff	(Australia) Barry Miles	Palm Meadows	
1997	(Australia) Barry Miles	156	+12	4 strokes	(Australia) Brian Baker (Australia) John Neeson	Royal Pines	

The event was held over 36 holes in 1997 and 1998 and over 54 holes in 1999.

=== Women ===
Year	Winner	Score	To par	Margin of victory	Runner(s)-up	Venue	Ref.
Australian Master of the Amateurs
2026	(Australia) Raegan Denton	287	−5	1 stroke	(United States) Catherine Park	Southern	
2025	(South Korea) Yang Hyo-jin	286	−6	2 strokes	(Australia) Ella Scaysbrook	Southern	
2024	(Philippines) Rianne Malixi	285	−7	1 stroke	(India) Avani Prashanth	Southern	
2023	(Japan) Yuna Araki	280	−12	6 strokes	(Japan) Mamika Shinchi	Southern	
2022	(Malaysia) Jeneath Wong	284	−4	7 strokes	(Australia) Belinda Ji	Victoria	
2021	(Australia) Lion Higo	286	−2	6 strokes	(Australia) Stephanie Bunque	Victoria	
2020	(Malaysia) Alyaa Abdulghany	286	−2	Playoff	(Taiwan) An Ho-yu (Australia) Cassie Porter	Victoria	
2019	(Australia) Stephanie Kyriacou	290	+2	3 strokes	(Australia) Julienne Soo	Royal Melbourne	
2018	(Japan) Yuka Yasuda	287	−1	5 strokes	(Australia) Julienne Soo	Royal Melbourne	
