= 2022–23 PGA Tour of Australasia =

Golf tour season

2022–23 PGA Tour of Australasia season
- Duration: 13 October 2022 – 2 April 2023
- Number of official events: 16
- Most wins: (Australia) David Micheluzzi (3)
- Order of Merit: (Australia) David Micheluzzi
- Player of the Year: (Australia) David Micheluzzi
- Rookie of the Year: (Australia) Haydn Barron

The 2022–23 PGA Tour of Australasia, titled as the 2022–23 ISPS Handa PGA Tour of Australasia for sponsorship reasons, was the 49th season on the PGA Tour of Australasia, the main professional golf tour in Australia and New Zealand since it was formed in 1973.

== Changes for 2022–23 ==
The season marked a switch of format in the Order of Merit, which saw it become a points-based system, rather than based on money earned.

== Schedule ==
The following table lists official events during the 2022–23 season.

Date	Tournament	Location	Purse (A$)	Winner (Note: The number in brackets after each winner's name is the number of PGA Tour of Australasia events they had won up to and including that tournament. This information is only shown for PGA Tour of Australasia members.)	OWGR points	Other tours (Note: ASA − Asian Tour; EUR − European Tour; WANZ − WPGA Tour of Australasia.)	Notes
16 Oct	CKB WA PGA Championship	Western Australia	250,000	(Australia) David Micheluzzi (1)	1.04		
23 Oct	Nexus Advisernet WA Open	Western Australia	162,500	(Australia) Deyen Lawson (1)	1.06		
13 Nov	Victorian PGA Championship	Victoria	250,000	(Australia) Andrew Martin (2)	1.11		
20 Nov	QLD PGA Championship	Queensland	250,000	(Australia) Aaron Wilkin (1)	1.40		
27 Nov	Fortinet Australian PGA Championship	Queensland	2,000,000	(Australia) Cameron Smith (3)	10.06	EUR	
4 Dec	ISPS Handa Australian Open	Victoria	1,700,000	(Poland) Adrian Meronk (n/a)	10.26	EUR	
11 Dec	Gippsland Super 6	Victoria	200,000	(Australia) Tom Power Horan (2)	1.55		
29 Jan	TPS Victoria	Victoria	250,000	(South Korea) Yoon Min-a (n/a)	1.65 (Note: OWGR points at the TPS Victoria were awarded based on men's scores only. James Marchesani had the lowest men's score and was awarded with the 1.65 points.)	WANZ	Mixed event
5 Feb	TPS Murray River	New South Wales	250,000	(Australia) Sarah Jane Smith (n/a)	1.42 (Note: OWGR points at the TPS Murray River were awarded based on men's scores only. Andrew Martin and Shae Wools-Cobb tied for the lowest men's score and split the assigned points for first and second places, each earning 1.14 points.)	WANZ	Mixed event
12 Feb	Vic Open	Victoria	420,000	(New Zealand) Michael Hendry (4)	1.94		
19 Feb	TPS Sydney	New South Wales	250,000	(Australia) David Micheluzzi (2)	1.49	WANZ	Mixed event
26 Feb	TPS Hunter Valley	New South Wales	250,000	(Australia) Brett Coletta (2)	1.25	WANZ	Mixed event
5 Mar	New Zealand Open	New Zealand	NZ$1,650,000	(Australia) Brendan Jones (1)	5.85	ASA	
12 Mar	NZ PGA Championship	New Zealand	150,000	(Australia) Louis Dobbelaar (1)	1.20		
19 Mar	Play Today NSW Open	New South Wales	400,000	(Australia) David Micheluzzi (3)	2.56		
2 Apr	The National Tournament	Victoria	200,000	(Australia) Tom Power Horan (3)	1.81		

=== Unofficial events ===
The following events were sanctioned by the PGA Tour of Australasia, but did not carry official money, nor were wins official.

Date	Tournament	Location	Purse (A$)	Winner	OWGR points	Notes
6 Dec	Cathedral Invitational	Victoria	300,000	(Australia) Nick Flanagan	n/a	Limited-field event

== Order of Merit ==
The Order of Merit was based on tournament results during the season, calculated using a points-based system. The top three players on the Order of Merit earned status to play on the 2024 European Tour (DP World Tour).

Position	Player	Points	Status earned
1	(Australia) David Micheluzzi	1,455	Promoted to European Tour
2	(Australia) Tom Power Horan	875	Promoted to European Tour
3	(Australia) Andrew Martin	661	Promoted to European Tour
4	(New Zealand) Michael Hendry	583	
5	(Australia) John Lyras	543	

== Awards ==
Award	Winner	Ref.
Player of the Year	(Australia) David Micheluzzi	
Rookie of the Year	(Australia) Haydn Barron	
