= The National Tournament =

Professional golf tournament

Tournament information
- Location: Cape Schanck, Victoria, Australia
- Established: 2021
- Course: The National Golf Club
- Par: 72
- Length: 7,097 yards (6,489 m)
- Tour: PGA Tour of Australasia
- Format: Stroke play
- Prize fund: A$200,000
- Month played: March

Tournament record score
- Aggregate: 269 Tom Power Horan (2023); 269 Harrison Crowe (2025)
- To par: −19 as above

Current champion
- (Australia) Cameron John

Location map
- Location in Australia Location in Victoria

The National Tournament is a professional golf tournament played in Victoria, Australia. The Moonah Links PGA Classic was held in February 2021 while The National PGA Classic was held in April 2022.

The Moonah Links PGA Classic was held on the Moonah Links the week after it had hosted the Victorian PGA Championship. It was added to the 2020–21 schedule following a number of tournament cancellations. With the prospect of travel difficulties, the final 36 holes were played on a Thursday. The National PGA Classic was added to the 2021–22 schedule following the cancellation of events in New Zealand. It was played on the Gunnamatta course.

The tournament returned in 2023 as The National Tournament, played again at The National Golf Club, as well as being the season-ending event.

== Winners ==
| Year | Winner | Score | To par | Margin of victory | Runner(s)-up | Venue |
The National Tournament
| 2026 | (Australia) Cameron John (2) | 277 | −11 | Playoff | (Australia) Daniel Gale | The National |
| 2025 | (Australia) Harrison Crowe | 269 | −19 | 2 strokes | (Australia) Anthony Quayle | The National |
| 2024 | (Australia) Cameron John | 272 | −16 | 3 strokes | (Australia) Daniel Gale | The National |
| 2023 | (Australia) Tom Power Horan | 269 | −19 | 1 stroke | (Australia) John Lyras | The National |
The National PGA Classic
| 2022 | (United States) Derek Ackerman | 273 | −15 | 2 strokes | (Australia) Nathan Barbieri (Australia) Harrison Crowe (a) (Australia) Blake Windred | The National |
Moonah Links PGA Classic
| 2021 | (Australia) Bryden Macpherson | 270 | −18 | 1 stroke | (Australia) Justin Warren | Moonah Links |
