= Terry Price (golfer) =

Australian professional golfer (born 1960)

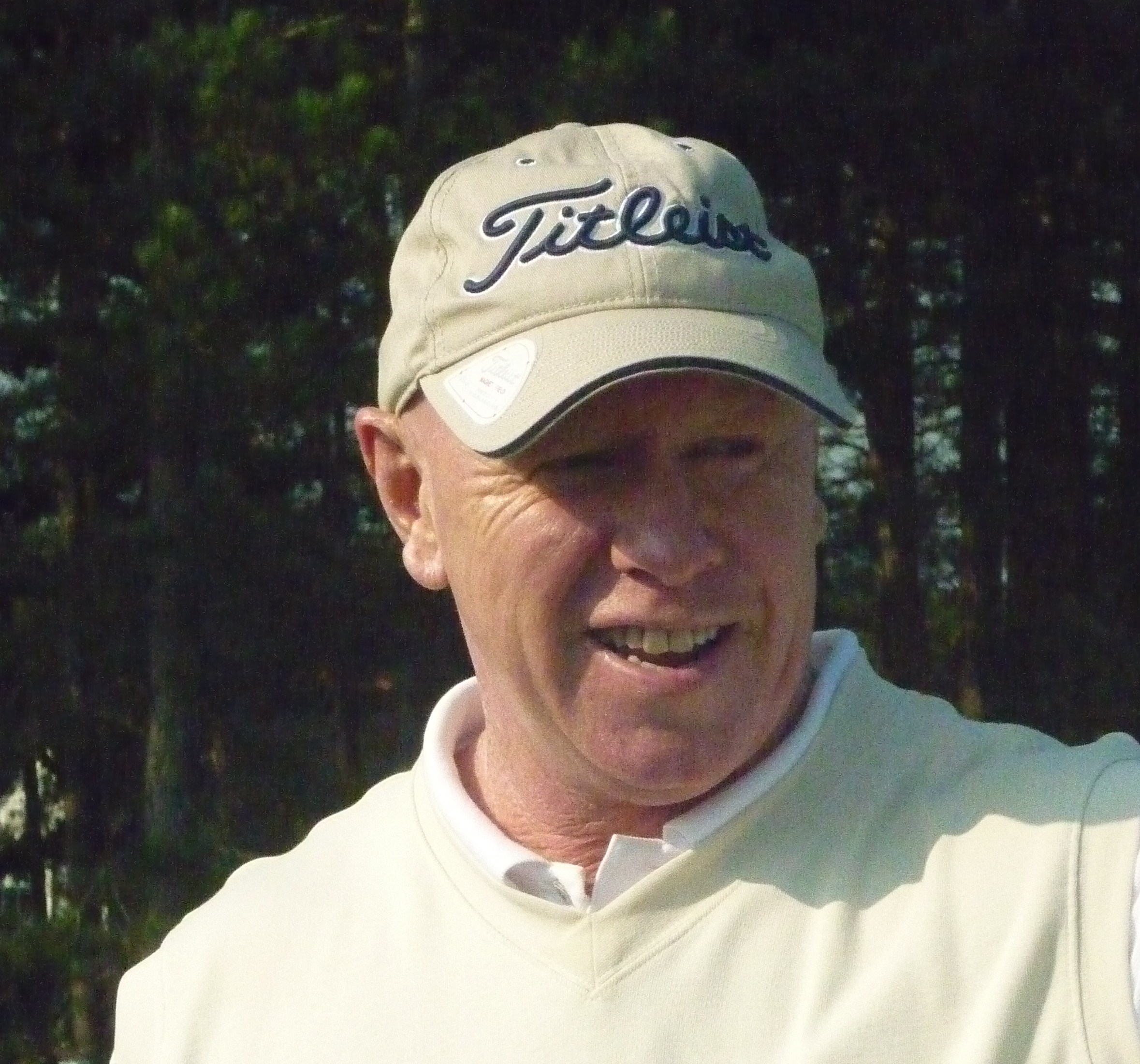

Personal information
- Nickname: The Rock
- Nationality: Australia
- Born: 27 December 1960 (age 65) Rockhampton, Australia
- Height: 1.75 m (5 ft 9 in)
- Weight: 89 kg (196 lb; 14.0 st)

Career
- Sport: Golf
- Turned professional: 1978
- Current tours: European Senior Tour; PGA Tour of Australasia
- Former tour: European Tour
- Professional wins: 28

Number of wins by tour
- PGA Tour of Australasia: 6
- European Senior Tour: 1
- Other: 21

Best results in major championships
- Masters Tournament: DNP
- PGA Championship: DNP
- U.S. Open: DNP
- The Open Championship: T24: 1994

Terry Price (born 27 December 1960) is an Australian professional golfer.

== Career ==
Price was born in Rockhampton, Queensland.

In 1978, at the age of 17, Price turned professional. In 1986, he joined the PGA Tour of Australasia. He won his first tournament in 1988 at the non-Order of Merit Queensland PGA Championship. He has since won five official events on the tour, in addition to several more victories both in Australia and internationally.

Price has also played on the European Tour. He played three seasons in the early 1990s, finishing just inside the top 100 on the Order of Merit in 1994 and 1995, before losing his card at the end of 1996. He returned to the European Tour in 2003 via qualifying school, but had to revisit at the end of the season to regain his card. He achieved a career best finish on the Order of Merit of 53rd in 2004, but he was unable to build on that and after missing much of the 2006 season due to injury, lost his card at the end of 2007.

Price began playing on the European Senior Tour in 2012 and won his first title in September at the Pon Senior Open in Germany.

== Personal life ==
Price currently lives in Hope Island, Queensland with his wife and three children.

== Professional wins (28) ==
=== PGA Tour of Australasia wins (5) ===
No.	Date	Tournament	Winning score	Margin of victory	Runner(s)-up
1	25 Oct 1992	Dunhill Malaysian Masters	−11 (69-69-70-69=277)	2 strokes	(Australia) Anthony Gilligan, (Taiwan) Hsieh Yu-shu
2	12 Dec 1993	Air New Zealand Shell Open	−7 (71-72-68-66=277)	1 stroke	(New Zealand) Michael Campbell, (United States) Brad Faxon, (Australia) Wayne Riley
3	7 Apr 2002	Volvo Trucks Golf Klassik	−17 (68-70-67-70=275)	1 stroke	(Australia) Brad Kennedy
4	10 Nov 2002	New South Wales Open	−9 (66-71-72-70=279)	1 stroke	(Australia) Wayne Grady, (Australia) Adam Groom, (Australia) Jason Norris, (New Zealand) Mahal Pearce, (Australia) Andre Stolz
5	18 Jan 2004	Holden New Zealand Open	−9 (69-65-67-70=271)	1 stroke	(New Zealand) Brad Heaven (a)

=== Swedish Golf Tour wins (1) ===
No.	Date	Tournament	Winning score	Margin of victory	Runner-up
1	22 May 1988	Naturgas Open	−6 (74-70-66=210)	Playoff	(England) Joe Higgins

=== Foundation Tour wins (2) ===
- 1993 Queensland Open
- 1995 Queensland Open

=== Other wins (3) ===
- 1988 Queensland PGA Championship
- 1989 Papua New Guinea Masters
- 1990 Queensland PGA Championship

=== European Senior Tour wins (1) ===
No.	Date	Tournament	Winning score	Margin of victory	Runners-up
1	9 Sep 2012	Pon Senior Open	−16 (67-66-67=200)	6 strokes	(France) Marc Farry, (England) Barry Lane

=== PGA of Australia Legends Tour wins (16) ===
note: this list is probably incomplete

- 2013 (2) SA PGA Senior Foursomes Championship (with Mike Ferguson), Rosnay Legends Charity Pro-Am
- 2014 (2) Bargara Legends Pro-Am, NSW/ACT PGA Seniors Championships
- 2018 (2) "The Jack Harris & Brian Twite" Victorian PGA Seniors Foursomes Championship (with Tim Elliott), Altitude Wealth Solutions Mt Warren Park Legends Pro-Am
- 2019 (2) Australian Valve Group Legends Pro-Am, Boonah Legends Pro-Am
- 2020 (1) Twin Waters Legends Pro-Am (with Matthew Ecob)
- 2021 (1) Brisbane Legends Pro-Am
- 2022 (1) Provincial Distributors City Legends Pro-Am
- 2023 (3) Barwon Cleaning Supplies Portarlington Legends Pro-Am (with Andre Stolz), Bastion Invitational Legends Pro-Am, Mulpha Legends Pro-Am
- 2024 (2) Settlers Run Legends Pro-Am, Fidelity Capital Group Charity Legends Pro-Am (with Richard Gilkey)

== Results in major championships ==
Tournament	1993	1994	1995	1996
The Open Championship	CUT	T24		CUT

Note: Price only played in The Open Championship.

Did not play

CUT = missed the half-way cut
"T" = tied

== Team appearances ==
- World Cup (representing Australia): 1999
