= Daniel Nisbet =

Australian professional golfer

Personal information
- Nationality: Australia
- Born: 13 September 1990 (age 36) Redcliffe, Queensland, Australia
- Height: 5 ft 9 in (175 cm)
- Weight: 191 lb (87 kg)

Career
- Sport: Golf
- Turned professional: 2012
- Former tours: PGA Tour of Australasia; PGA Tour China; Asian Tour
- Professional wins: 5

Number of wins by tour
- Asian Tour: 1
- PGA Tour of Australasia: 3
- Other: 2

Achievements and awards
- Australian Junior Order of Merit: 2006

Daniel Nisbet (born 13 September 1990) is a professional golfer from Australia. He has three wins on the PGA Tour of Australasia, including the 2018 New Zealand Open, an event co-sanctioned by the Asian Tour.

== Early life and amateur career ==
Nisbet was born in 1990 and grew up on a golf course, Caboolture Golf Club, and started playing golf early. He had success as an amateur and won the Australian Junior Order of Merit in 2006. In 2008, he won the Australian Boys' Amateur and Handa Junior Masters.

In 2012, he lost the final of the Australian Amateur to Marcel Schneider, and finished runner-up at the Australian Master of the Amateurs at Royal Melbourne Golf Club.

Nisbet represented Australia at the 2012 Eisenhower Trophy together with Cameron Smith and Matt Stieger.

Nisbet served an 18-month suspension from November 2009 to May 2011 for an anti-doping rule violation in relation to possession of DHEA.

== Professional career ==
Nisbet turned professional in 2012 and joined the PGA Tour of Australasia. In his rookie season, he was runner-up at the 2012 NSW PGA Championship, three strokes behind Matt Stieger. He tied for 3rd at the WA Open Championship in 2014 and 2015. In April 2015, he won his first professional title, the PGA of Australia's Morobe Open in Papua New Guinea.

In 2016, he played on the PGA Tour China, where he won the Clearwater Bay Open in Hong Kong, after he rolled in a 10-foot putt for eagle on the first hole of a sudden-death playoff.

On the 2018 PGA Tour of Australasia, Nisbet won two tournaments, the New Zealand Open and the MMC Northern Territory PGA Championship, and finished the season a career-best third on the Order of Merit.

In 2019, he won his third PGA Tour of Australasia title, the Queensland PGA Championship, by six strokes.

== Personal life ==
Nisbet first met his wife when they were 12 and 11 years old, playing in a junior golf tournament. They started dating seven years later and got married in 2016.

== Amateur wins ==
- 2008 Australian Boys' Amateur, Handa Junior Masters
- 2012 Lake Macquarie Amateur, Players Amateur

== Professional wins (5) ==
=== Asian Tour wins (1) ===
No.	Date	Tournament	Winning score	Margin of victory	Runner-up
1	4 Mar 2018	ISPS Handa New Zealand Open^{1}	−27 (63-66-67-62=258)	2 strokes	(Australia) Terry Pilkadaris

^{1}Co-sanctioned by the PGA Tour of Australasia

=== PGA Tour of Australasia wins (3) ===
No.	Date	Tournament	Winning score	Margin of victory	Runner(s)-up
1	4 Mar 2018	ISPS Handa New Zealand Open^{1}	−27 (63-66-67-62=258)	2 strokes	(Australia) Terry Pilkadaris
2	19 Aug 2018	MMC Northern Territory PGA Championship	−19 (64-69-69-63=265)	2 strokes	(Australia) Daniel Gale, (Australia) Damien Jordan
3	24 Feb 2019	Coca-Cola Queensland PGA Championship	−24 (66-63-63-64=256)	6 strokes	(Australia) Harrison Endycott, (Australia) Deyen Lawson

^{1}Co-sanctioned by the Asian Tour

=== PGA Tour China wins (1) ===
No.	Date	Tournament	Winning score	Margin of victory	Runner-up
1	6 Nov 2016	Clearwater Bay Open	−19 (69-67-65-64=265)	Playoff	(United States) Alexander Kang

=== Other wins (1) ===
- 2015 Morobe Open

== Results in World Golf Championships ==
Tournament	2019
Champions	77

== Team appearances ==
Amateur

- Eisenhower Trophy (representing New Zealand): 2012
