= Rebel Sport Masters =

Tournament information
- Location: Wainui, New Zealand
- Established: 2018
- Course: Wainui Golf Club
- Par: 71
- Length: 7,093 yards (6,486 m)
- Tour: PGA Tour of Australasia
- Format: Stroke play
- Prize fund: A$100,000
- Month played: January
- Final year: 2018

Tournament record score
- Aggregate: 273 Matthew Millar (2018)
- To par: −11 as above

Final champion
- (Australia) Matthew Millar

Location map
- Location in New Zealand

The Rebel Sport Masters was a Tier 2 golf tournament on the PGA Tour of Australasia held from 11–14 January 2018 at Wainui Golf Club, Wainui, New Zealand. Total prize money was A$100,000. Matthew Millar won by four strokes, taking the first prize of A$15,000. The event was sponsored by Rebel Sport.

== Winners ==
| Year | Winner | Score | To par | Margin of victory | Runner-up |
|---|---|---|---|---|---|
| 2018 | (Australia) Matthew Millar | 273 | −11 | 4 strokes | (New Zealand) David Smail |
