= Northern Territory PGA Championship =

Tailor-made Building Services NT PGA Championship
Tournament information
- Location: Palmerston, Northern Territory, Australia
- Established: 1995
- Courses: Palmerston Golf & Country Club
- Par: 71
- Length: 6,563 yards (6,001 m)
- Tour: PGA Tour of Australasia
- Format: Stroke play
- Prize fund: A$200,000
- Month played: May

Tournament record score
- Aggregate: 264 Brett Rankin (2019); 264 Austin Bautista (2022)
- To par: −20 as above

Current champion
- (Australia) Andrew Martin

Final champion
- Location in Australia Location in Northern Territory

The Northern Territory PGA Championship is a golf tournament on the PGA Tour of Australasia played at Palmerston Golf & Country Club, Palmerston, Northern Territory, Australia. The event was revived in 2016 as Tier 2 event on the tour. Since 2016, total prize money has been A$150,000, except for 2020, which was not an Order of Merit event. The 2016 winner was Jordan Zunic who beat Max McCardle by two strokes.

== Winners ==
Year	Tour (Note: ANZ − PGA Tour of Australasia; FT − Foundation Tour.)	Winner	Score	To par	Margin of victory	Runner(s)-up
Tailor-made Building Services NT PGA Championship
2025	ANZ	(Australia) Andrew Martin	272	−12	1 stroke	(Australia) Nathan Barbieri
2024: No tournament
2023	ANZ	(Australia) Daniel Gale	270	−14	4 strokes	(Australia) Chris Crabtree
2022	ANZ	(Australia) Austin Bautista	264	−20	7 strokes	(Australia) Tim Hart (Australia) Ben Wharton
2021	ANZ	No tournament due to the COVID-19 pandemic				
2020		(Australia) Aaron Pike	201	−12	Playoff (Note: Pike won with a par on the first hole of a sudden-death playoff.)	(Australia) Michael Sim
2019	ANZ	(Australia) Brett Rankin	264	−20	3 strokes	(Australia) Taylor Macdonald
MMC Northern Territory PGA Championship
2018	ANZ	(Australia) Daniel Nisbet	265	−19	2 strokes	(Australia) Daniel Gale (Australia) Damien Jordan
Northern Territory PGA Championship
2017	ANZ	(Australia) Travis Smyth (a)	265	−19	6 strokes	(Australia) Deyen Lawson
2016	ANZ	(Australia) Jordan Zunic	271	−13	2 strokes	(Australia) Max McCardle
1997–2015: No tournament
1996	FT	(Australia) David Diaz	208		1 stroke	(Australia) Justin Cooper (Australia) Adrian Percey (Australia) Shane Robinson
1995	FT	(Australia) David Iwasaki-Smith	200		6 strokes	(Australia) Tony Carolan
