= Harrison Crowe =

Australian professional golfer

Personal information
- Nationality: Australia
- Born: 15 October 2001 (age 25) Bexley, New South Wales, Australia

Career
- Sport: Golf
- Turned professional: 2023
- Current tour: PGA Tour of Australasia
- Former tour: Asian Tour
- Professional wins: 2

Number of wins by tour
- PGA Tour of Australasia: 2

Best results in major championships
- Masters Tournament: CUT: 2023
- PGA Championship: DNP
- U.S. Open: DNP
- The Open Championship: CUT: 2023

Harrison Crowe (born 15 October 2001) is an Australian professional golfer. In 2022, he won the New South Wales Open and the Asia-Pacific Amateur Championship.

== Amateur career ==
Crowe had a stellar amateur career, topped off by winning the 2022 Asia-Pacific Amateur Championship in Thailand, which earned him major championship starts at both the 2023 Masters Tournament and the 2023 Open Championship. In 2022, Crowe went viral after he executed a trick shot at the Old Course at St Andrews, hitting a ball from the pavement outside a pub, over nearby buildings and onto the 18th green.

Crowe won the Victorian Amateur Championship back-to-back in 2020 and 2021. In 2022, he won the Australian Master of the Amateurs and the 2022 New South Wales Amateur Championship, where he was runner-up in 2023. He represented Australia at the 2022 Eisenhower Trophy and won the 2023 Bonallack Trophy with the Asia/Pacific team.

In 2022, Crowe won the New South Wales Open at Concord Golf Club, becoming the first to win both the New South Wales Amateur and Open in the same year since Jim Ferrier in 1938. He was also runner-up at the PGA Classic at The National, another PGA Tour of Australasia event. He rose to 23rd in the World Amateur Golf Ranking.

== Professional career ==
Crowe turned professional in September 2023 and joined the PGA Tour of Australasia, capitalizing on the exemption he received for winning the NSW Open. He was runner-up at the 2023 Queensland PGA Championship.

== Amateur wins ==
- 2017 Tasmanian Junior Masters
- 2018 Bonville Champions Trophy
- 2020 Victorian Amateur Championship
- 2021 Victorian Amateur Championship
- 2022 Australian Master of the Amateurs, Asia-Pacific Amateur Championship

== Professional wins (2) ==
=== PGA Tour of Australasia wins (2) ===
No.	Date	Tournament	Winning score	Margin of victory	Runner-up
1	20 Mar 2022	Golf Challenge NSW Open (as an amateur)	−18 (64-64-67=195) (Note: Shortened to 54 holes due to weather.)	1 stroke	(Australia) Blake Windred
2	30 Mar 2025	The National Tournament	−19 (68-69-64-68=269)	2 strokes	(Australia) Anthony Quayle

== Results in major championships ==
Tournament	2023
Masters Tournament	CUT
PGA Championship	
U.S. Open	
The Open Championship	CUT

Did not play

CUT = missed the half-way cut

== Team appearances ==
Amateur

- Australian Boys' Interstate Teams Matches (representing New South Wales): 2018, 2019
- Australian Men's Interstate Teams Matches (representing New South Wales): 2018, 2019
- Australian Interstate Teams Matches (representing New South Wales): 2022, 2023
- Eisenhower Trophy (representing Australia): 2022
- Bonallack Trophy (representing Asia/Pacific): 2023 (winners)
