= Ashley Lau =

Malaysian professional golfer

Ashley Lau Jen Wen
Personal information
- Nationality: Malaysia
- Born: 18 March 2000 (age 26) Bintulu, Sarawak, Malaysia
- Height: 5 ft 5 in (165 cm)

Career
- Sport: Golf
- College: University of Michigan
- Turned professional: 2022
- Current tours: Epson Tour; WPGA Tour of Australasia
- Professional wins: 1

Number of wins by tour
- WPGA Tour of Australasia: 1

Achievements and awards
- Big Ten Golfer of the Year: 2022
Medal record
Southeast Asian Games
Bronze medal – third place	2017 Malaysia	Women's team
Silver medal – second place	2019 Philippines	Women's team

Ashley Lau (born 18 March 2000) is a Malaysian professional golfer who plays on the Epson Tour and WPGA Tour of Australasia. In 2024, she won the Women's Victorian Open and was runner-up at the Epson Tour Championship. An Olympian, she competed in the women's individual event at the 2024 Summer Olympics. She was the flag bearer of Malaysia at the 2024 Summer Olympics closing ceremony.

== Amateur career ==
Lau, born 2000, is from Bintulu in Sarawak, Malaysia. She became the first Sarawakian to top the national women's golf rankings, and later the first Sarawakian woman to turn professional.

In 2015, Lau tied for 4th at the Australian Girls' Amateur. In 2016, she won the 2016 Katherine Kirk Classic and was runner-up at the Hills Australian Junior Championship. Lau tied for third at the 2017 Queensland Girls' Amateur Championship. In 2019, she was runner-up at the Orlando International Amateur Championship, and in 2021, runner-up at the Michigan PGA Women's Open.

Lau represented Malaysia at the 2017 Southeast Asian Games, the 2018 Asian Games and the 2019 Southeast Asian Games, securing a silver medal in the team event at the latter together with Natasha Andrea Oon.

Lau attended the Hills International prep academy in Queensland, Australia. She enrolled at University of Michigan in 2018 and played with the Michigan Wolverines women's golf team until 2022. She earned WGCA First Team All-American Honors and was named Big Ten Golfer of the Year in 2022.

Lau was on the winning international team at the 2022 Arnold Palmer Cup, and finished 3rd at the 2022 Ann Arbor's Road to the LPGA on the Epson Tour.

== Professional career ==
Lau turned professional in December 2022 and joined the 2023 Epson Tour. In her rookie season, she recorded two top-10 finishes including a season-best 3rd place at the Wildhorse Ladies Golf Classic.

In February 2024, playing on the WPGA Tour of Australasia, she was best woman and runner-up overall at the Webex Players Series Victoria, a stroke behind Kazuma Kobori, and won the Women's Victorian Open a stroke ahead of Jiyai Shin.

Lau rose into the top-250 on the Women's World Golf Rankings and finished 50th in the qualification rankings, to represent Malaysia at the 2024 Summer Olympics in Paris, beating out compatriot Natasha Andrea Oon for the spot. She finished tied 55th.

She was solo runner-up at the 2024 Epson Tour Championship, but fell short of securing a 2025 LPGA Tour card.

== Amateur wins ==
- 2013 Proton TSM Challenge
- 2015 Sarawak Amateur, AmBank SportExcel International Junior Championship
- 2016 Katherine Kirk Classic, AmBank SportExcel International Junior Championship
- 2018 RSGC Junior Amateur Open, Sarawak Amateur, FCG International Junior Championship
- 2021 Indiana Invitational
- 2022 Tulane Classic, Florida Gators Invitational, Indiana Invitational

== Professional wins (1) ==
=== WPGA Tour of Australasia wins (1) ===
No.	Date	Tournament	Winning score	To par	Margin of victory	Runner-up
1	4 Feb 2024	Women's Victorian Open	68-74-69-66=277	−12	1 stroke	(South Korea) Jiyai Shin

== Team appearances ==
Amateur

- Queen Sirikit Cup (representing Malaysia): 2015, 2016, 2017, 2018
- Arnold Palmer Cup (representing International team): 2022 (winners)
