= The Players Series =

Webex Players Series
Tournament information
- Location: Australia
- Established: 2021
- Tours: PGA Tour of Australasia; WPGA Tour of Australasia
- Format: Stroke play

Tournament record score
- Aggregate: 259 David Micheluzzi (2023)
- To par: −25 David Micheluzzi (2023) −25 Nick Voke (2025) −25 Declan O'Donovan (2026)

The Players Series, titled as the Webex Players Series for sponsorship reasons, is a series of professional golf tournaments played in Australia with men and women competing in the same field, although they play from different tees. The series began in 2021. The tournaments are played as part of both the PGA Tour of Australasia and WPGA Tour of Australasia schedules.

== 2020–21 season ==
Date	Tournament	Tours (Note: ALPG − ALPG Tour; ANZ − PGA Tour of Australasia.)	Winner	Score	To par	Margin of victory	Runner-up	Venue	Ref.
31 Jan 2021	TPS Victoria	ALPG, ANZ	(Australia) Brad Kennedy	267	−17	1 stroke	(Australia) Elvis Smylie (a)	Rosebud	
7 Mar 2021	TPS Sydney	ALPG, ANZ	(Australia) Andrew Martin	266	−18	2 strokes	(Australia) Charlie Dann	Bonnie Doon	

== 2021–22 season ==
Date	Tournament	Tours (Note: ANZ − PGA Tour of Australasia; WANZ − WPGA Tour of Australasia.)	Winner	Score	To par	Margin of victory	Runner(s)-up	Venue	Ref.
6 Feb 2022	TPS Victoria	ANZ, WANZ	(Australia) Todd Sinnott	264	−20	1 stroke	(Australia) Daniel Gale (Australia) Anthony Quayle	Rosebud	
20 Feb 2022	TPS Murray River	ANZ, WANZ	(Australia) Hannah Green	264	−20	4 strokes	(Australia) Andrew Evans (Australia) Hayden Hopewell (a)	Cobram Barooga	
6 Mar 2022	TPS Sydney	ANZ, WANZ	(Australia) Jarryd Felton	198 (Note: Shortened to 54 holes due to rain.)	−15	Playoff	(Australia) Brendan Jones	Bonnie Doon	
13 Mar 2022	TPS Hunter Valley	ANZ, WANZ	(Australia) Aaron Pike	200	−8	Playoff	(New Zealand) Momoka Kobori	Oaks Cypress Lakes	

== 2022–23 season ==
Date	Tournament	Tours	Winner	Score	To par	Margin of victory	Runner(s)-up	Venue	Ref.
29 Jan 2023	TPS Victoria	ANZ, WANZ	(South Korea) Yoon Min-a	260	−24	1 stroke	(Australia) James Marchesani	Rosebud	
5 Feb 2023	TPS Murray River	ANZ, WANZ	(Australia) Sarah Jane Smith	264	−20	5 strokes	(Australia) Andrew Martin (Australia) Shae Wools-Cobb	Cobram Barooga	
19 Feb 2023	TPS Sydney	ANZ, WANZ	(Australia) David Micheluzzi	259	−25	4 strokes	(Australia) Daniel Gale (Australia) Deyen Lawson	Bonnie Doon	
26 Feb 2023	TPS Hunter Valley	ANZ, WANZ	(Australia) Brett Coletta	269	−11	Playoff	(Australia) Lincoln Tighe	Oaks Cypress Lakes	

== 2023–24 season ==
Date	Tournament	Tours	Winner	Score	To par	Margin of victory	Runner(s)-up	Venue	Ref.
22 Oct 2023	Webex Players Series SA	ANZ, WANZ	(Australia) Austin Bautista	268	−12	1 stroke	(Australia) Andrew Campbell (Australia) Joshua Greer (Australia) Corey Lamb	Willunga	
21 Jan 2024	Webex Players Series Murray River	ANZ, WANZ	(New Zealand) Kazuma Kobori	263	−21	2 strokes	(Singapore) Shannon Tan	Cobram Barooga	
28 Jan 2024	Webex Players Series Victoria	ANZ, WANZ	(New Zealand) Kazuma Kobori	266	−18	1 stroke	(Malaysia) Ashley Lau	Rosebud	
11 Feb 2024	Webex Players Series Sydney	ANZ, WANZ	(New Zealand) Kazuma Kobori	264	−24	1 stroke	(South Korea) Jenny Shin	Castle Hill	
18 Feb 2024	Webex Players Series Hunter Valley	ANZ, WANZ	(Australia) Daniel Gale	261	−19	1 stroke	(Australia) Phoenix Campbell (a)	Oaks Cypress Lakes	

== 2024–25 season ==
Date	Tournament	Tours	Winner	Score	To par	Margin of victory	Runner(s)-up	Venue	Ref.
27 Oct 2024	Webex Players Series SA	ANZ, WANZ	(Australia) Jack Buchanan	266	−14	3 strokes	(Australia) Phoenix Campbell (Australia) Corey Lamb (Australia) Kathryn Norris	Willunga	
12 Jan 2025	Webex Players Series Perth	ANZ, WANZ	(Australia) Jordan Doull	271	−17	Playoff	(Australia) Haydn Barron	Royal Fremantle	
26 Jan 2025	Webex Players Series Victoria	ANZ, WANZ	(Australia) Michael Wright	265	−15	Playoff	(Australia) Jak Carter	Rosebud	
2 Feb 2025	Webex Players Series Murray River	ANZ, WANZ	(Australia) Blake Proverbs	261	−23	Playoff	(Australia) Jason Norris	Cobram Barooga	
23 Feb 2025	Webex Players Series Sydney	ANZ, WANZ	(New Zealand) Nick Voke	263	−25	1 stroke	(Australia) Jake McLeod	Castle Hill	

== 2025–26 season ==
Date	Tournament	Tours	Winner	Score	To par	Margin of victory	Runner(s)-up	Venue	Ref.
26 Oct 2025	Webex Players Series SA	ANZ, WANZ	(Australia) Matias Sanchez	264	−16	2 strokes	(Australia) Adam Bland	Willunga	
11 Jan 2026	Webex Players Series Perth	ANZ, WANZ	(Australia) Connor McKinney	270	−18	4 strokes	(Australia) Curtis Luck (Australia) Kirsten Rudgeley (Australia) Abbie Teasdale	Royal Fremantle	
25 Jan 2026	Webex Players Series Victoria	ANZ, WANZ	(Australia) Jordan Doull	268	−12	Playoff	(Australia) Cameron John	Rosebud	
1 Feb 2026	Webex Players Series Murray River	ANZ, WANZ	(Australia) Haydn Barron	262	−22	1 stroke	(New Zealand) Jimmy Zheng	Cobram Barooga	
8 Feb 2026	Webex Players Series Sydney	ANZ, WANZ	(Australia) Declan O'Donovan	263	−25	5 strokes	(Australia) Brady Watt	Castle Hill	

== 2026–27 season ==
Date	Tournament	Tours	Winner	Score	To par	Margin of victory	Runner(s)-up	Venue	Ref.
25 Oct 2026	Webex Players Series SA	ANZ, WANZ	(Australia) Adam Bland	263	−17	2 strokes	(Australia) Louis Dobbelaar	Willunga	
10 Jan 2027	Webex Players Series Perth	ANZ, WANZ						Royal Fremantle	
17 Jan 2027	Webex Players Series Victoria	ANZ, WANZ						Peninsula Kingswood	
31 Jan 2027	Webex Players Series Murray River	ANZ, WANZ						Cobram Barooga	
7 Feb 2027	Webex Players Series Sydney	ANZ, WANZ						Castle Hill	
