= 2023–24 PGA Tour of Australasia =

Golf tour season

2023–24 PGA Tour of Australasia season
- Duration: 4 May 2023 – 17 March 2024
- Number of official events: 18
- Most wins: (New Zealand) Kazuma Kobori (3)
- Order of Merit: (New Zealand) Kazuma Kobori
- Player of the Year: (New Zealand) Kazuma Kobori
- Rookie of the Year: (New Zealand) Kazuma Kobori

The 2023–24 PGA Tour of Australasia, titled as the 2023–24 Challenger PGA Tour of Australasia for sponsorship reasons, was the 50th season on the PGA Tour of Australasia, the main professional golf tour in Australia and New Zealand since it was formed in 1973.

== Changes for 2023–24 ==
The season marked the return of the PNG Open, being played for the first time since 2019. The Heritage Classic also returned to the schedule, having not been played since 2013.

== Challenger title sponsorship ==
In October 2023, it was announced that the tour had signed a title sponsorship agreement with Australian investment firm Challenger, being renamed as the Challenger PGA Tour of Australasia.

== Schedule ==
The following table lists official events during the 2023–24 season.

Date	Tournament	Location	Purse (A$)	Winner (Note: The number in brackets after each winner's name is the number of PGA Tour of Australasia events they had won up to and including that tournament. This information is only shown for PGA Tour of Australasia members.)	OWGR points	Other tours (Note: ASA − Asian Tour; EUR − European Tour; WANZ − WPGA Tour of Australasia.)	Notes
7 May	PNG Open	Papua New Guinea	180,000	(Australia) Lachlan Barker (1)	0.39		
20 Aug	Tailor-made Building Services NT PGA Championship	Northern Territory	200,000	(Australia) Daniel Gale (2)	1.07		
8 Oct	Nexus Advisernet/Bowra & O'Dea WA Open	Western Australia	175,000	(Australia) Simon Hawkes (2)	1.14		
15 Oct	CKB WA PGA Championship	Western Australia	250,000	(Australia) Ben Eccles (2)	1.30		
22 Oct	Webex Players Series SA	South Australia	200,000	(Australia) Austin Bautista (2)	1.50	WANZ	Mixed event
5 Nov	Queensland PGA Championship	Queensland	250,000	(Australia) Phoenix Campbell (a) (1)	1.69		
12 Nov	Gippsland Super 6	Victoria	200,000	(New Zealand) Kerry Mountcastle (1)	1.12		
19 Nov	Victorian PGA Championship	Victoria	250,000	(Australia) David Micheluzzi (4)	1.53		
26 Nov	Fortinet Australian PGA Championship	Queensland	2,000,000	(Australia) Min Woo Lee (2)	13.51	EUR	
3 Dec	ISPS Handa Australian Open	New South Wales	1,700,000	(Chile) Joaquín Niemann (n/a)	14.80	EUR	
14 Jan	Heritage Classic	Victoria	200,000	(Australia) Matthew Griffin (4)	1.89		
21 Jan	Webex Players Series Murray River	Victoria	250,000	(New Zealand) Kazuma Kobori (2)	1.47	WANZ	Mixed event
28 Jan	Webex Players Series Victoria	Victoria	250,000	(New Zealand) Kazuma Kobori (3)	2.48	WANZ	Mixed event
4 Feb	Vic Open	Victoria	420,000	(Australia) Brett Coletta (3)	3.07		
11 Feb	Webex Players Series Sydney	New South Wales	250,000	(New Zealand) Kazuma Kobori (4)	2.11	WANZ	Mixed event
18 Feb	Webex Players Series Hunter Valley	New South Wales	250,000	(Australia) Daniel Gale (3)	1.67	WANZ	Mixed event
3 Mar	New Zealand Open	New Zealand	NZ$2,000,000	(Japan) Takahiro Hataji (n/a)	6.63	ASA	
17 Mar	The National Tournament	Victoria	200,000	(Australia) Cameron John (1)	2.32		

=== Unofficial events ===
The following events were sanctioned by the PGA Tour of Australasia, but did not carry official money, nor were wins official.

Date	Tournament	Location	Purse (A$)	Winner	OWGR points	Notes
6 Dec	Cathedral Invitational	Victoria	300,000	(Australia) Adam Scott	n/a	Limited-field event

== Order of Merit ==
The Order of Merit was based on tournament results during the season, calculated using a points-based system. The top three players on the Order of Merit earned status to play on the 2025 European Tour (DP World Tour).

Position	Player	Points	Status earned
1	(New Zealand) Kazuma Kobori	841	Promoted to European Tour
2	(Australia) Daniel Gale	647	Promoted to European Tour
3	(Australia) Brett Coletta	604	Promoted to European Tour
4	(Australia) Matthew Griffin	506	
5	(Australia) David Micheluzzi	384	

== Awards ==
Award	Winner	Ref.
Player of the Year	(New Zealand) Kazuma Kobori	
Rookie of the Year	(New Zealand) Kazuma Kobori	
