= 2025–26 PGA Tour of Australasia =

Golf tour season

2025–26 PGA Tour of Australasia season
- Duration: 14 August 2025 – 29 March 2026
- Number of official events: 20
- Most wins: (Australia) Cameron John (3)
- Order of Merit: (Australia) Travis Smyth
- Rookie of the Year: (Australia) Declan O'Donovan

The 2025–26 PGA Tour of Australasia, titled as the 2025–26 Challenger PGA Tour of Australasia for sponsorship reasons, was the 52nd season on the PGA Tour of Australasia, the main professional golf tour in Australia and New Zealand since it was formed in 1973.

== Schedule ==
The following table lists official events during the 2025–26 season.

Date	Tournament	Location	Purse (A$)	Winner (Note: The number in brackets after each winner's name is the number of PGA Tour of Australasia events they had won up to and including that tournament. This information is only shown for PGA Tour of Australasia members.)	OWGR points	Other tours (Note: ASA − Asian Tour; EUR − European Tour; JPN − Japan Golf Tour; WANZ − WPGA Tour of Australasia.)	Notes
17 Aug	PNG Open	Papua New Guinea	225,000	(Australia) Cory Crawford (3)	1.72		
31 Aug	Tailor-made Building Services NT PGA Championship	Northern Territory	200,000	(Australia) Andrew Martin (3)	2.41		
12 Oct	CKB WA PGA Championship	Western Australia	250,000	(Australia) Austin Bautista (3)	3.03		
19 Oct	Nexus Advisernet Bowra & O'Dea WA Open	Western Australia	200,000	(South Africa) Oliver Bekker (1)	4.06		
26 Oct	Webex Players Series SA	South Australia	200,000	(Australia) Matias Sanchez (1)	2.36	WANZ	Mixed event
16 Nov	Ford NSW Open	New South Wales	800,000	(Australia) Christopher Wood (2)	3.96		
23 Nov	Queensland PGA Championship	Queensland	250,000	(Australia) Cameron John (2)	3.02		
30 Nov	BMW Australian PGA Championship	Queensland	2,500,000	(Spain) David Puig (n/a)	16.42	EUR	
7 Dec	Crown Australian Open	Victoria	2,000,000	(Denmark) Rasmus Neergaard-Petersen (n/a)	20.70	EUR	
14 Dec	Victorian PGA Championship	Victoria	250,000	(Australia) Marc Leishman (1)	3.82		
11 Jan	Webex Players Series Perth	Western Australia	250,000	(Australia) Connor McKinney (1)	2.55	WANZ	Mixed event
18 Jan	Vic Open	Victoria	200,000	(Australia) Cameron John (3)	3.37		
25 Jan	Webex Players Series Victoria	Victoria	250,000	(Australia) Jordan Doull (2)	2.99	WANZ	Mixed event
1 Feb	Webex Players Series Murray River	New South Wales	250,000	(Australia) Haydn Barron (1)	3.15	WANZ	Mixed event
8 Feb	Webex Players Series Sydney	New South Wales	250,000	(Australia) Declan O'Donovan (1)	2.89	WANZ	Mixed event
22 Feb	Quinovic New Zealand PGA Championship	New Zealand	200,000	(United States) Austen Truslow (n/a)	3.45		
1 Mar	New Zealand Open	New Zealand	NZ$2,000,000	(New Zealand) Daniel Hillier (1)	10.08	ASA	
8 Mar	ISPS Handa Japan-Australasia Championship	New Zealand	1,200,000	(Australia) Travis Smyth (2)	9.49	JPN	New tournament
15 Mar	Heritage Classic	Victoria	250,000	(Australia) Will Florimo (1)	4.04		
29 Mar	The National Tournament	Victoria	200,000	(Australia) Cameron John (4)	2.42		

=== Unofficial events ===
The following events were sanctioned by the PGA Tour of Australasia, but did not carry official money, nor were wins official.

Date	Tournament	Location	Purse (A$)	Winner	OWGR points	Other tours	Notes
28 Sep	World Sand Greens Championship	New South Wales	140,000	(Australia) Samuel Slater	n/a		

== Order of Merit ==
The Order of Merit was based on tournament results during the season, calculated using a points-based system. The leading player on the Order of Merit earned status to play on the 2027 European Tour (DP World Tour). The next two players on the Order of Merit earned status to play on the 2027 Challenge Tour (HotelPlanner Tour).

Position	Player	Points	Status earned
1	(Australia) Travis Smyth	969	Promoted to European Tour
2	(Australia) Cameron John	962	Promoted to Challenge Tour
3	(Australia) James Marchesani	720	Promoted to Challenge Tour
4	(Australia) Haydn Barron	658	
5	(Australia) Will Florimo	654	

== Awards ==
Award	Winner	Ref.
Player of the Year		
Rookie of the Year	(Australia) Declan O'Donovan	
