= Viraat Badhwar =

Australian golfer

Viraat Badhwar (born 28 August 1995) is an Indian-Australian amateur golfer from Queensland, Australia.

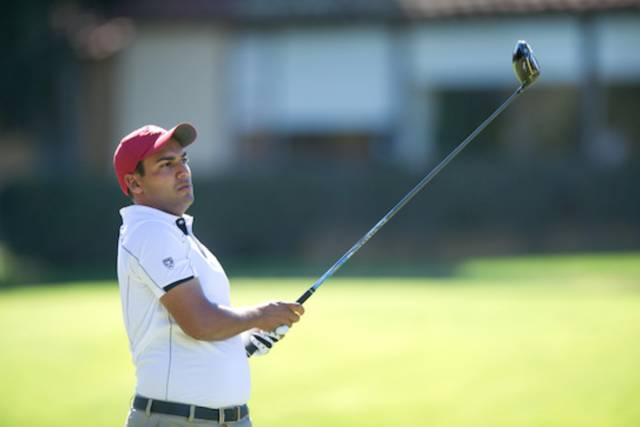
Viraat Badhwar

== Personal life ==
Badhwar was born in New Delhi, India and took up golf at the early age of six, playing at the Delhi Golf Club, New Delhi and Jaypee Greens Golf Resort, Greater Noida. His early schooling was at Delhi Public School, East of Kailash (Junior School) and then Delhi Public School, R.K. Puram (Senior School).

He moved with his family at the age of eleven to Brisbane, Queensland, Australia and completed his high school education at Kelvin Grove State College in 2012, where he was part of the Queensland Golf School of Excellence. He was a member of the Queensland Junior State Squad in 2011, 2012 and 2013, Queensland Mens State Squad in 2013 and was a member of the Queensland Academy of Sport.

He attended Stanford University from 2013 to 2017. While there, he set the Stanford men's golf course record of 59.

== Tournament wins ==
- 2010 Junior World Golf Championships (Boys 13–14)
- 2012 Toyota World Junior Golf World Cup (individual champion)
- 2013 Master of the Amateurs

== Team appearances ==
Amateur

- Australian Men's Interstate Teams Matches (representing Queensland): 2013 (winners)

== Awards ==
- Byron Nelson International Junior Golf Award 2013
- 2013 Queensland Junior Sport Star of the Year
