= 2018 PGA Tour of Australasia =

Golf tour season

2018 PGA Tour of Australasia season
- Duration: 11 January 2018 – 2 December 2018
- Number of official events: 16
- Most wins: (Australia) Daniel Nisbet (2)
- Order of Merit: (Australia) Jake McLeod
- Player of the Year: (Australia) Matthew Millar

The 2018 PGA Tour of Australasia, titled as the 2018 ISPS Handa PGA Tour of Australasia for sponsorship reasons, was the 45th season on the PGA Tour of Australasia, the main professional golf tour in Australia and New Zealand since it was formed in 1973.

== Schedule ==
The following table lists official events during the 2018 season.

Date	Tournament	Location	Purse (A$)	Winner (Note: The number in brackets after each winner's name is the number of PGA Tour of Australasia events they had won up to and including that tournament. This information is only shown for PGA Tour of Australasia members.)	OWGR points	Other tours (Note: ASA − Asian Tour; EUR − European Tour.)	Notes
14 Jan	Rebel Sport Masters	New Zealand	100,000	(Australia) Matthew Millar (2)	7		New tournament
4 Feb	Oates Vic Open	Victoria	650,000	(Australia) Simon Hawkes (1)	16		
11 Feb	ISPS Handa World Super 6 Perth	Western Australia	1,750,000	(Thailand) Kiradech Aphibarnrat (n/a)	23	ASA, EUR	
18 Feb	Coca-Cola Queensland PGA Championship	Queensland	125,000	(Australia) Daniel Fox (2)	7		
25 Feb	Horizon Golf New Zealand PGA Championship	New Zealand	NZ$125,000	(New Zealand) Ben Campbell (1)	7		
4 Mar	ISPS Handa New Zealand Open	New Zealand	NZ$1,150,000	(Australia) Daniel Nisbet (1)	15	ASA	
29 Apr	SP PNG Golf Open	Papua New Guinea	145,000	(Australia) Daniel Gale (1)	6		
13 May	TX Civil & Logistics WA PGA Championship	Western Australia	125,000	(New Zealand) Michael Long (4)	6		
5 Aug	Fiji International	Fiji	1,250,000	(India) Gaganjeet Bhullar (n/a)	15	ASA, EUR	
19 Aug	MMC Northern Territory PGA Championship	Northern Territory	150,000	(Australia) Daniel Nisbet (2)	6		
14 Oct	Victorian PGA Championship	Victoria	100,000	(Australia) Aaron Pike (1)	6		
28 Oct	Nexus Risk TSA Group WA Open	Western Australia	100,000	(Australia) Zach Murray (a) (1)	6		
4 Nov	Isuzu Queensland Open	Queensland	110,000	(Australia) Jordan Zunic (3)	6		
11 Nov	AVJennings NSW Open	New South Wales	400,000	(Australia) Jake McLeod (1)	16		
18 Nov	Emirates Australian Open	New South Wales	1,250,000	(Mexico) Abraham Ancer (n/a)	32		Flagship event
2 Dec	Australian PGA Championship	Queensland	1,500,000	(Australia) Cameron Smith (2)	20	EUR	

== Order of Merit ==
The Order of Merit was based on prize money won during the season, calculated in Australian dollars. The leading player on the Order of Merit earned status to play on the 2019 European Tour.

Position	Player	Prize money (A$)	Status earned
1	(Australia) Jake McLeod	255,327	Promoted to European Tour
2	(Australia) Matthew Millar	236,241	
3	(Australia) Daniel Nisbet	225,982	
4	(Australia) Anthony Quayle	202,620	
5	(Australia) Dimitrios Papadatos	197,796	

== Awards ==
Award	Winner	Ref.
Player of the Year	(Australia) Matthew Millar	
