= 2015 PGA Tour of Australasia =

Golf tour season

2015 PGA Tour of Australasia season
- Duration: 5 February 2015 – 13 December 2015
- Number of official events: 15
- Order of Merit: (Australia) Nathan Holman
- Player of the Year: (Australia) Matthew Millar

The 2015 PGA Tour of Australasia was the 42nd season on the PGA Tour of Australasia, the main professional golf tour in Australia and New Zealand since it was formed in 1973.

== Schedule ==
The following table lists official events during the 2015 season.

Date	Tournament	Location	Purse (A$)	Winner (Note: The number in brackets after each winner's name is the number of PGA Tour of Australasia events they had won up to and including that tournament. This information is only shown for PGA Tour of Australasia members.)	OWGR points	Other tours (Note: EUR − European Tour; ONE − OneAsia Tour.)	Notes
8 Feb	Oates Vic Open	Victoria	250,000	(Australia) Richard Green (2)	7		
13 Feb	Mercedes-Benz Truck and Bus Victorian PGA Championship	Victoria	100,000	(Australia) Aaron Townsend (2)	6		
22 Feb	Coca-Cola Queensland PGA Championship	Queensland	120,000	(New Zealand) Ryan Fox (2)	7		
8 Mar	Holden New Zealand PGA Championship	New Zealand	NZ$125,000	(Australia) Matthew Millar (1)	6		
15 Mar	BMW New Zealand Open	New Zealand	NZ$1,000,000	(Australia) Jordan Zunic (1)	16		
23 Aug	Isuzu Queensland Open	Queensland	110,000	(Australia) David Bransdon (3)	7		
3 Oct	South Pacific Open Championship	New Caledonia	150,000	(Australia) James Nitties (2)	6		
18 Oct	Fiji International	Fiji	1,125,000	(United States) Matt Kuchar (n/a)	11	ONE	
1 Nov	TX Civil & Logistics WA PGA Championship	Western Australia	120,000	(Australia) Brett Rumford (2)	6		
8 Nov	Nexus Risk TSA Group WA Open	Western Australia	100,000	(Australia) Daniel Fox (1)	6		
15 Nov	NSW Open	New South Wales	110,000	(Australia) Ben Eccles (a) (1)	6		
22 Nov	Uniqlo Masters	Victoria	750,000	(Australia) Peter Senior (21)	16		
29 Nov	Emirates Australian Open	New South Wales	1,250,000	(Australia) Matt Jones (1)	32	ONE	Flagship event
6 Dec	Australian PGA Championship	Queensland	1,750,000	(Australia) Nathan Holman (1)	20	EUR	
13 Dec	NSW PGA Championship	New South Wales	110,000	(Australia) Jarryd Felton (1)	6		

== Order of Merit ==
The Order of Merit was based on prize money won during the season, calculated in Australian dollars.

Position	Player	Prize money (A$)
1	(Australia) Nathan Holman	346,702
2	(Australia) Jordan Zunic	204,388
3	(Australia) Matthew Millar	177,421
4	(Australia) Aron Price	167,450
5	(Australia) Cameron Smith	143,636

== Awards ==
Award	Winner	Ref.
Player of the Year	(Australia) Matthew Millar	
