= Gippsland Super 6 =

Tournament information
- Location: Warragul, Victoria, Australia
- Established: 2019
- Course: Warragul Country Club
- Par: 70
- Length: 6,023 yards (5,507 m)
- Tour: PGA Tour of Australasia
- Format: Stroke play and Match play
- Prize fund: A$200,000
- Month played: December

Tournament record score
- Aggregate: 19 Tom Power Horan (2022)
- To par: −4 as above

Current champion
- (Australia) Ben Henkel

Location map
- Location in Australia Location in Victoria

The Gippsland Super 6 is a golf tournament that was played for the first time in November 2019. It is played at Warragul Country Club in Warragul, Gippsland, in south-eastern Victoria, Australia.

== Format ==
The tournament uses a "Super 6" format. The first three days consist of ordinary stroke play, with a cut after 36 holes reducing the field to the top 50 and ties. After 54 holes, the field is cut to a fixed 24. On the final day, there is a knock-out phase, when six-hole stroke play contests are played. The leading 8 players after 54 holes receive a bye to the second round.

== History ==
Because of bad weather the inaugural event in 2019 was reduced to 54 holes, the knockout phase being abandoned. Tom Power Horan won with a score of 205, 11 under par, beating Brady Watt by a stroke.

Marcus Fraser won the January 2021 event, beating Swiss professional Alessandro Noseda by a stroke in the final. Fraser had been close to defeat in his opening knockout match against Andrew Martin. Martin was two strokes ahead with two holes to play but then had a double-bogey, while Fraser made a birdie.

Jack Thompson won the December 2021 event, beating Jordan Zunic in the final. They were tied after six holes but Thompson won at the first extra hole.

== Winners ==
Year	Winner	Score	To par	Margin of victory	Runner-up
2024	(Australia) Ben Henkel	22	−2	Playoff	(Australia) Dylan Gardner
2023	(New Zealand) Kerry Mountcastle	22	−2	1 stroke	(Australia) Jake McLeod
2022	(Australia) Tom Power Horan (2)	19	−4	3 strokes	(Australia) Kyle Michel
2021 (Dec)	(Australia) Jack Thompson	22	−1	Playoff	(Australia) Jordan Zunic
2021 (Jan)	(Australia) Marcus Fraser	22	−2	1 stroke	(Switzerland) Alessandro Noseda
2020: No tournament
2019	(Australia) Tom Power Horan	205 (Note: Shortened to 54 holes due to weather.)	−11	1 stroke	(Australia) Brady Watt
