= Lawry Flynn =

Australian professional golfer

Personal information
- Full name: Lawry Flynn
- Nickname: Lorry
- Nationality: Australia
- Born: March 4, 1998 (age 28) Dalby, Queensland, Australia

Career
- Sport: Golf
- Turned professional: 2021
- Current tours: PGA Tour of Australasia; Asian Tour

Lawry Flynn (born 4 March 1998) is an Australian professional golfer who currently plays on the Asian Tour and the PGA Tour of Australasia. His highest official world golf ranking was 774th in March 2022.

== Early golf career ==
Flynn started playing golf at the age of 9. Hailing from Dalby in the Darling Downs region of south-west Queensland, the access to private golf clubs and academy programs as a junior was limited. The foundation of Flynn's swing developed on the family farm in Dalby. With 500 acres of space, Flynn built two holes and his very own bunker.

In 2017 Flynn won the 117th Malaysian Amateur Open.

== Professional career ==
Flynn turned professional on the in July 2021.

Flynn shot a round of 62 (eight-under-par) in the third round of the Western Australian Open to earn a spot in the final group on Sunday. He went to finish tied-fifth.

Flynn equaled an PGA Tour of Australasia record for held by Paul Gow (2001 Canon Challenge), Ernie Els (2004 Heineken Classic), Alistair Presnell (2010 Victorian PGA) and broke the tournament record of 60 (11-under par) at Bonnie Doon Golf Club TPS Sydney, missing a birdie putt on the final hole to stand alone.

At the 2023 Queensland PGA Championship, Flynn finished tied second along with six other players who all lost out to amateur Phoenix Campbell
