= 2019 PGA Tour of Australasia =

Golf tour season

2019 PGA Tour of Australasia season
- Duration: 7 February 2019 – 22 December 2019
- Number of official events: 13
- Order of Merit: (New Zealand) Ryan Fox
- Player of the Year: (New Zealand) Ryan Fox

The 2019 PGA Tour of Australasia, titled as the 2019 ISPS Handa PGA Tour of Australasia for sponsorship reasons, was the 46th season on the PGA Tour of Australasia, the main professional golf tour in Australia and New Zealand since it was formed in 1973.

== Schedule ==
The following table lists official events during the 2019 season.

Date	Tournament	Location	Purse (A$)	Winner (Note: The number in brackets after each winner's name is the number of PGA Tour of Australasia events they had won up to and including that tournament. This information is only shown for PGA Tour of Australasia members.)	OWGR points	Other tours (Note: ASA − Asian Tour; EUR − European Tour.)	Notes
10 Feb	ISPS Handa Vic Open	Victoria	1,500,000	(Scotland) David Law (n/a)	20	EUR	
17 Feb	ISPS Handa World Super 6 Perth	Western Australia	1,600,000	(New Zealand) Ryan Fox (3)	20	ASA, EUR	
24 Feb	Coca-Cola Queensland PGA Championship	Queensland	150,000	(Australia) Daniel Nisbet (3)	6		
3 Mar	New Zealand Open	New Zealand	NZ$1,250,000	(Australia) Zach Murray (2)	15	ASA	
10 Mar	SEC NZ PGA Championship	New Zealand	NZ$125,000	(New Zealand) Kazuma Kobori (a) (1)	7		
12 May	SP PNG Golf Open	Papua New Guinea	150,000	(Australia) Peter Cooke (1)	6		
25 Aug	Tailor-made Building Services NT PGA Championship	Northern Territory	150,000	(Australia) Brett Rankin (1)	6		
13 Oct	TX Civil & Logistics WA PGA Championship	Western Australia	137,500	(Australia) Darren Beck (1)	6		
27 Oct	Victorian PGA Championship	Victoria	125,000	(New Zealand) Campbell Rawson (1)	6		
10 Nov	Gippsland Super 6	Victoria	125,000	(Australia) Tom Power Horan (1)	6		
1 Dec	AVJennings NSW Open	New South Wales	400,000	(Australia) Josh Younger (1)	16		
8 Dec	Emirates Australian Open	New South Wales	1,500,000	(Australia) Matt Jones (2)	32		Flagship event
22 Dec	Australian PGA Championship	Queensland	1,500,000	(Australia) Adam Scott (6)	20	EUR	

== Order of Merit ==
The Order of Merit was based on prize money won during the season, calculated in Australian dollars. The leading player on the Order of Merit (not otherwise exempt) earned status to play on the 2020 European Tour.

Position	Player	Prize money (A$)	Status earned
1	(New Zealand) Ryan Fox	307,926	Already exempt (Note: Fox was already exempt due to being a tournament winner on the 2019 European Tour.)
2	(Australia) Zach Murray	230,773	Promoted to European Tour
3	(Australia) Brad Kennedy	221,771	
4	(Australia) Wade Ormsby	215,825	Already exempt (Note: Orsmby was already exempt due to finishing inside the Top 115 of the 2019 Race to Dubai.)
5	(New Zealand) Michael Hendry	176,045	

== Awards ==
Award	Winner	Ref.
Player of the Year	(New Zealand) Ryan Fox	
