= Jordan Zunic =

Australian golfer

Personal information
- Nationality: Australia
- Born: 27 December 1991 (age 34) Sydney, Australia
- Height: 6 ft 5 in (1.96 m)

Career
- Sport: Golf
- Turned professional: 2015
- Current tour: PGA Tour of Australasia
- Former tour: Asian Tour
- Professional wins: 4

Number of wins by tour
- PGA Tour of Australasia: 3
- Other: 1

Jordan Zunic (born 27 December 1991) is an Australian professional golfer.

== Career ==
Zunic is the son of Zoran and Tania Zunic. His father played basketball in the National Basketball League (NBL) for the Sydney Supersonics (1983) and Sydney Kings (1988). His brother, Kyle, also plays in the NBL.

Zunic won the 2013 Tasmanian Open as an amateur. In 2014, he won the China Amateur.

Zunic turned professional in January 2015. He won the 2015 BMW New Zealand Open in March.

== Amateur wins ==
- 2010 New South Wales Junior Boys
- 2014 China Amateur

== Professional wins (4) ==
=== PGA Tour of Australasia wins (3) ===
No.	Date	Tournament	Winning score	Margin of victory	Runner-up
1	15 Mar 2015	BMW New Zealand Open	−21 (68-66-66-66=266)	1 stroke	(Australia) David Bransdon
2	14 Aug 2016	Northern Territory PGA Championship	−13 (64-67-69-71=271)	2 strokes	(Australia) Max McCardle
3	4 Nov 2018	Isuzu Queensland Open	−11 (67-68-65-73=273)	1 stroke	(Australia) Rhein Gibson

PGA Tour of Australasia playoff record (0–2)

No.	Year	Tournament	Opponent	Result
1	2017	Australian PGA Championship	(Australia) Cameron Smith	Lost to par on second extra hole
2	2021	Gippsland Super 6	(Australia) Jack Thompson	Lost to par on first extra hole

=== Other wins (1) ===
- 2013 Tasmanian Open (as an amateur)

== Playoff record ==
European Tour playoff record (0–1)

No.	Year	Tournament	Opponent	Result
1	2017	Australian PGA Championship	(Australia) Cameron Smith	Lost to par on second extra hole

== Results in World Golf Championships ==
Tournament	2016
Championship	T61
Match Play	
Invitational	
Champions	T58

Did not play

"T" = Tied

== Team appearances ==
Amateur

- Australian Men's Interstate Teams Matches (representing New South Wales): 2012 (winners), 2013, 2014
