= Zach Murray =

Australian professional golfer (born 1997)

Personal information
- Nickname: Muzza
- Nationality: Australia
- Born: 29 March 1997 (age 29) Wodonga, Victoria, Australia
- Height: 6 ft 4 in (193 cm)

Career
- Sport: Golf
- Turned professional: 2018
- Current tour: PGA Tour of Australasia
- Former tours: European Tour; Asian Tour
- Professional wins: 3

Number of wins by tour
- Asian Tour: 1
- PGA Tour of Australasia: 2
- Other: 1

Zach Murray (born 29 March 1997) is an Australian professional golfer who currently plays on the Asian Tour and the PGA Tour of Australasia.

== Early life and amateur career ==
In 1997, Murray was born in Wodonga, Victoria, Australia. He was also raised in the town. He was brought up in a non-golfing family but learned to take up the game at the age of 13.

Murray had notable success as an amateur including becoming the second-youngest men's winner of the Victorian Amateur Championship in 2013. He also added another victory in China, at the Aaron Baddeley International Junior against a strong international field. This win gave him a start at the 2014 Emirates Australian Open.

Murray won the 2015 Australian Master of the Amateurs by two strokes in a field which included future stars Bryson DeChambeau and Cameron Davis.

Murray won his first professional event at the 2018 Nexus Risk TSA Group WA Open while still having his amateur status. A final round of 69 saw him win by two strokes. He went on to turn professional a few weeks after this win.

== Professional career ==
Murray turned professional in November 2018. He won the 2019 New Zealand Open, becoming the third fastest rookie to win on the Asian Tour after Kane Webber (2006 Macau Open) and Todd Sinnott (2017 Leopalace21 Myanmar Open), who both won on their second starts on the Asian Tour. As the New Zealand Open was co-sanctioned by the Asian Tour and the PGA Tour of Australasia, it gave Murray full playing rights on both tours, until the end of the 2021 season.

== Amateur wins ==
- 2013 Victorian Amateur Championship, Aaron Baddeley International Junior
- 2015 Australian Master of the Amateurs

== Professional wins (3) ==
=== Asian Tour wins (1) ===
No.	Date	Tournament	Winning score	Margin of victory	Runners-up
1	3 Mar 2019	New Zealand Open^{1}	−21 (63-65-70-68=266)	2 strokes	(New Zealand) Josh Geary, (Australia) Ashley Hall

^{1}Co-sanctioned by the PGA Tour of Australasia

=== PGA Tour of Australasia wins (2) ===
No.	Date	Tournament	Winning score	Margin of victory	Runner(s)-up
1	28 Oct 2018	Nexus Risk TSA Group WA Open (as an amateur)	−16 (64-70-69-69=272)	2 strokes	(Australia) David Micheluzzi (a)
2	3 Mar 2019	New Zealand Open^{1}	−21 (63-65-70-68=266)	2 strokes	(New Zealand) Josh Geary, (Australia) Ashley Hall

^{1}Co-sanctioned by the Asian Tour

=== Clutch Pro Tour wins (1) ===
No.	Date	Tournament	Winning score	Margin of victory	Runners-up
1	18 Jul 2023	Modest! Golf Championship	−10 (63-67=130)	1 stroke	(England) Piers Berrington, (England) Jack Yule

== Results in World Golf Championships ==
Tournament	2020
Championship	T48
Match Play	NT^{1}
Invitational	
Champions	NT^{1}

^{1}Cancelled due to COVID-19 pandemic

Did not play

NT = No tournament
"T" = Tied

== Team appearances ==
Amateur

- Bonallack Trophy (representing Asia/Pacific): 2016
- Sloan Morpeth Trophy (representing Australia): 2016 (winners)
- Australian Men's Interstate Teams Matches (representing Victoria): 2014 (winners), 2016, 2017 (winners), 2018 (winners)
