= Chirnside Park =

- Suburb
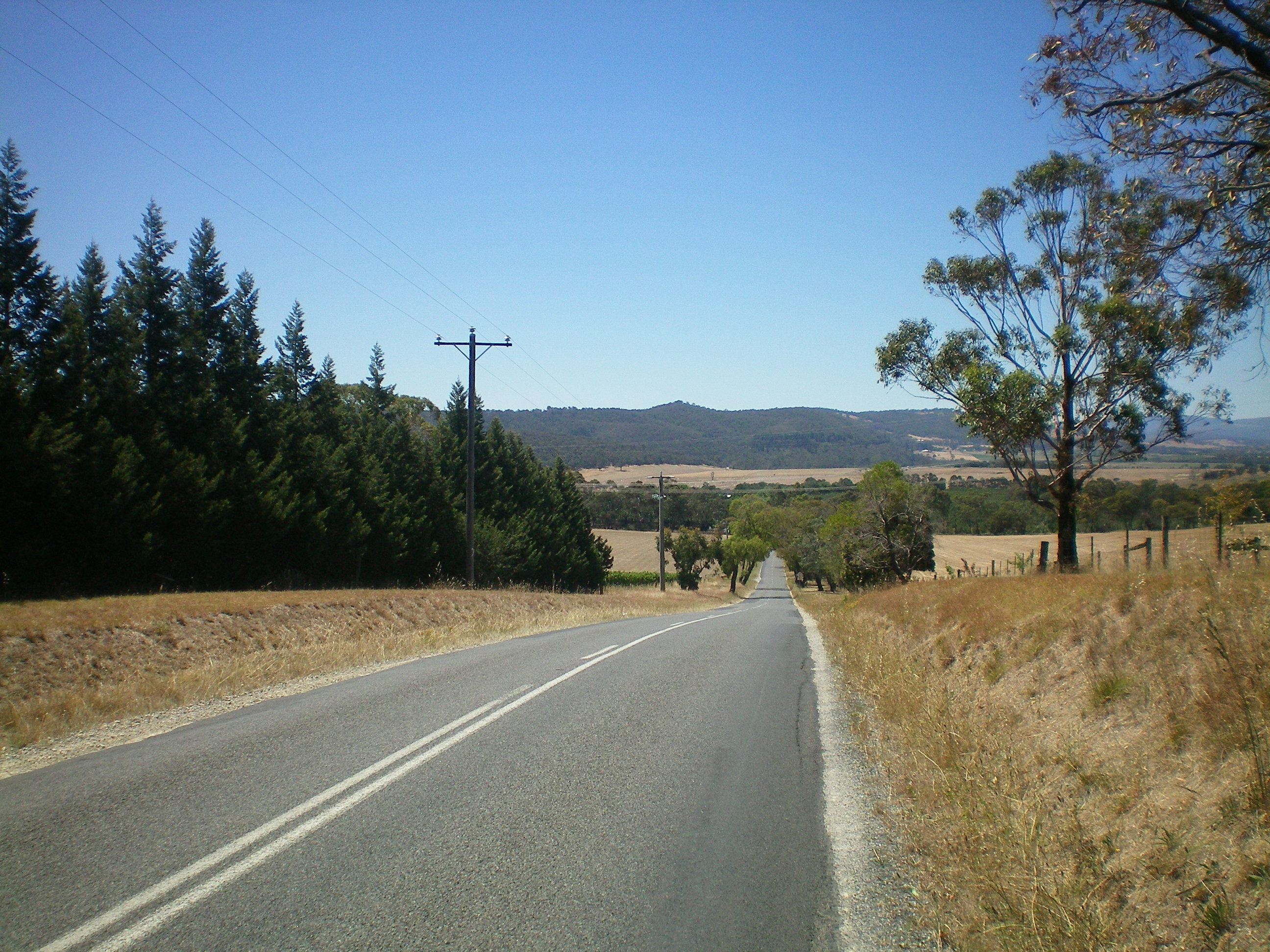
- Edward Road

- Interactive map of Chirnside Park
- Coordinates: 37.754°S 145.327°E
- Country: Australia
- State: Victoria
- City: Melbourne
- LGA: Shire of Yarra Ranges
- Location: 38 km (24 mi) NE of Melbourne CBD (Central Melbourne); 4 km (2.5 mi) NW of Lilydale

Government
  - State electorate: Evelyn
  - Federal division: Casey

Area
  - Total: 22.3 km^{2} (8.6 sq mi)
- Elevation: 116 m (381 ft)

Population
  - Total: 11,779 (2021 census)
  - Density: 528.2/km^{2} (1,368.0/sq mi)
- Postcode: 3116
Suburbs around Chirnside Park
Bend of Islands	Coldstream	Coldstream
Wonga Park	Chirnside Park	Lilydale
Croydon North	Croydon	Mooroolbark

Chirnside Park is a suburb in Melbourne, Victoria, Australia, 38 km (24 mi) east from Melbourne's central business district, located within the Shire of Yarra Ranges local government area. Chirnside Park recorded a population of 11,779 at the 2021 census.

== History ==
From 1837/1838, the area formed part of the pastoral run of John Gardiner, that was developed further by a succession of owners until the 1920s. The original sub-division of Chirnside Park was, at that time, known as Mooroolbark Park. Around 1,000 acres (400 ha) of mainly rich black basaltic soil was grazed and cultivated, watered from two perpetual springs.

In 1921, George Chirnside sold Werribee Park, moving the family's stud herds and the contents of Werribee Park Mansion to Mooroolbark Park. George Chirnside died in 1941, and permission to sell the estate was given in 1950, being finalised some years later. Subdivision was approved in 1956 by the Shire of Lillydale, with the residential area centred on the two-storey stone homestead, country club and golf course, named Chirnside Park in 1962 in honour of Thomas Chirnside.

Amadeo DeVincentiis, an Italian from Abruzzo, also owned great swathes of what is now known as Chirnside Park. However, he sold the land for a paltry amount in the 1960s, from which the fortunate purchasers stood to make a hefty profit. DeVincentiis spent thousands attempting to rescind the sale, but failed.

Formerly West Lilydale, the surrounding region became known as Chirnside Park in the 1970s. The Post Office opened on 25 September 1979.

== Today ==
Nominally a suburb of Melbourne, Chirnside Park is also a satellite community of Lilydale. The residential area was originally structured around a large 18-hole golf course, although that has since closed and a new estate known as Cloverlea has been built on the site, with dwellings on the north-eastern corner now completed. Further residential development has occurred to the west and north. New medical facilities opened recently, such as Chirnside Park Family Clinic.

The suburb is the site of several commercial wineries, orchards and livestock farms, as well as large residential estates. The Heritage Golf and Country Club is situated in the north-west corner of the suburb, on the Yarra River. Chirnside Park Shopping Centre is also located within the suburb.

== Schools ==
=== Private Schools ===
- Oxley Christian College

=== Government Schools ===
- Chirnside Park Primary School

== Sport ==
The suburb has a football and netball club, the Chirnside Park Football Netball Club, known as the Panthers, which competes in the Eastern Football Netball League and Lilydale & Yarra Valley Netball Association.

Chirnside Park is the home of the St Edmunds Basketball Club (known as the Saints), one of Australia's largest basketball clubs, based out of Oxley Stadium, competing in the Kilsyth & Mountain District Basketball Association.

The suburb is also the home of the Chirnside Park Cricket Club, which competes in the Ringwood and District Cricket Association.

== Demographics ==
At the 2021 census, Chirnside Park had a population of 11,779 people.

Age

The median age of residents was 38 years of age

Country of Birth

75.3% of residents were born in Australia. Other top responses for country of birth included England (4.1%), China (2.0%), India (1.7%), Italy (1.4%) and New Zealand (1.1%).

Religious Affiliation

For religious affiliation, the most common responses were "No Religion" (45.6%), Catholic (19.6%), and Anglican (8.4%).
