= The Heritage Golf and Country Club =

Country club in Chirnside Park, Victoria

Coordinates: 37°43′8″S 145°17′55″E

Club information
- Type: Private
- Website: www.heritagegolfclub.com.au

The Heritage Golf and Country Club is located approximately 45 kilometres east-north-east from Melbourne's CBD, in the suburb of Chirnside Park, Victoria, Australia. It opened in 1999 with the release of Stage One residential development, with the Jack Nicklaus–designed St John Golf Course opened in 2000. Stage Two, the Henley Golf Course, designed by Tony Cashmore, opened on 8 October 2006. The planning of Stage Three: Botanica, a residential development of apartments and villas, is complete. The Yarra Valley Lodge, is managed by Mantra.

== Location ==
The Heritage Golf and Country Club is set on the outskirts of the Melbourne metropolitan area. The Heritage Golf and Country Club is located in the suburb of Chirnside Park, and adjacent to suburbs of Wonga Park and Christmas Hills. The Henley Golf Course is located in Christmas Hills, across the Yarra River.

== Facilities ==
=== Yarra Valley Lodge ===
The Yarra Valley Lodge is operated by Austpac Hotels & Resorts. It opened in 2002. The hotel is located across the Heritage Avenue from the clubhouse.

=== Golf Courses ===
==== St John Golf Course ====
The 18-hole St John layout was opened in 2000. The course is designed by Jack Nicklaus. The championship course measures 6670 metres in length, with a par of 72 and an ACR of 76.

==== Henley Golf Course ====
The Henley layout opened to members in October 2006. The 18-hole course is designed by Tony Cashmore, in conjunction with the original design by Jack Nicklaus. In comparison to the St John course, the Henley is a links course, with far fewer trees, more water hazards and greater exposure to the natural elements, especially wind. In 2007 the playing rights were open to all members, their guests, and hotel patrons, similar to the St John Golf Course.

=== Kangaroo Cull ===
A cull of the resident kangaroos was planned to start at 9 pm on 27 April 2021. The cull was to take place over six hours in the dead of night with the carcasses of the dead kangaroos to be sent for dog food. Protesters turned out en masse, some prepared to place themselves in between the shooters and the kangaroos and the cull was halted. The situation is being closely watched by concerned environmental groups and locals who are fearful the shooters may return.

== See also ==
- List of golf courses designed by Jack Nicklaus
