= David Micheluzzi =

Australian professional golfer

Personal information
- Nickname: Micha
- Nationality: Australia
- Born: 29 July 1996 (age 30) Melbourne, Australia

Career
- Sport: Golf
- Turned professional: 2019
- Current tours: European Tour; PGA Tour of Australasia
- Professional wins: 4

Number of wins by tour
- PGA Tour of Australasia: 4

Best results in major championships
- Masters Tournament: DNP
- PGA Championship: CUT: 2023
- U.S. Open: DNP
- The Open Championship: CUT: 2023

Achievements and awards
- PGA Tour of Australasia Order of Merit winner: 2022–23
- PGA Tour of Australasia Player of the Year: 2022–23

David Micheluzzi (born 29 July 1996) is an Australian professional golfer who currently plays on the European Tour and the PGA Tour of Australasia. He won the 2022–23 PGA Tour of Australasia Order of Merit.

== Early life and amateur career ==
Micheluzzi grew up playing golf as a junior at Cranbourne Golf Club. In 2017, he won the Victorian Amateur Championship.

In 2018, he won the Australian Master of the Amateurs and was beaten in a playoff by Keita Nakajima at the Australian Amateur. In October, he finished runner-up at the Nexus Risk TSA Group WA Open on the PGA Tour of Australasia, two shots behind Zach Murray.

== Professional career ==
Micheluzzi turned professional in September 2019.

In October 2022, Micheluzzi claimed his first win on the PGA Tour of Australasia event at the CKB WA PGA Championship.

In February 2023, Micheluzzi finished second at the Vic Open, four shots behind Michael Hendry. The following week, he claimed his second PGA Tour of Australasia win at the TPS Sydney. Another win at the Play Today NSW Open in March saw him lock up the Order of Merit title for the 2022–23 season. In November, he won the Victorian PGA Championship and was also voted as the Player of the Year for 2022–23 season.

== Amateur wins ==
- 2017 Victorian Amateur Championship
- 2018 Australian Master of the Amateurs

== Professional wins (4) ==
=== PGA Tour of Australasia wins (4) ===
No.	Date	Tournament	Winning score	Margin of victory	Runner(s)-up
1	16 Oct 2022	CKB WA PGA Championship	−15 (71-67-65-70=273)	3 strokes	(Australia) Ben Ferguson
2	19 Feb 2023	TPS Sydney^{1}	−25 (66-68-64-61=259)	4 strokes	(Australia) Daniel Gale, (Australia) Deyen Lawson
3	19 Mar 2023	Play Today NSW Open	−20 (67-66-66-65=264)	2 strokes	(Australia) Kade McBride
4	19 Nov 2023	Victorian PGA Championship	−14 (70-69-67-68=274)	1 stroke	(Australia) Ben Eccles

^{1}Mixed event with the WPGA Tour of Australasia

== Results in major championships ==
Tournament	2023
Masters Tournament	
PGA Championship	CUT
U.S. Open	
The Open Championship	CUT

Did not play

CUT = missed the half-way cut

== Team appearances ==
Amateur

- Australian Men's Interstate Teams Matches (representing Victoria): 2015 (winners), 2016, 2017 (winners), 2018 (winners)
- Eisenhower Trophy (representing Australia): 2018
