= Moonah Links =

Moonah Links Golf Club
- Interactive map of Moonah Links Golf Club
- 38°24′20″S 144°51′10″E

Club information
- Location: Peter Thomson Drive; Fingal, Victoria
- Tournaments: Australian Open and The National Tournament
- Website: Moonah Links

The Moonah Links Golf Club is a golf club in Fingal, Victoria, Australia It has hosted the Australian Open twice.

- 2005 Robert Allenby - Australia
- 2003 Peter Lonard - Australia

== See also ==
- List of links golf courses
