= Gailes Golf Club =

Golf club in Wacol, Queensland, Australia

Coordinates: 27.6015°S 152.9169°E

Club information
- Tournaments: Australian Open

The Gailes Golf Club is a golf club in Wacol, Queensland, Australia, 20 minutes south of Brisbane. It hosted the Australian Open in 1955 with the winner was Bobby Locke from South Africa.
