= Matthew Millar (golfer) =

Australian professional golfer

Personal information
- Nationality: Australia
- Born: 5 September 1976 (age 50) Wollongong, New South Wales, Australia
- Height: 1.78 m (5 ft 10 in)
- Weight: 80 kg (180 lb; 13 st)
- Children: 1

Career
- Sport: Golf
- Turned professional: 1999
- Current tour: PGA Tour of Australasia
- Former tour: European Tour
- Professional wins: 2

Number of wins by tour
- PGA Tour of Australasia: 2

Best results in major championships
- Masters Tournament: DNP
- PGA Championship: DNP
- U.S. Open: DNP
- The Open Championship: T63: 2011

Achievements and awards
- PGA Tour of Australasia Player of the Year: 2015, 2018

Matthew Millar (born 5 September 1976) is an Australian professional golfer who plays on the PGA Tour of Australasia.

== Career ==
Millar turned professional in 1999. From 2006 to 2009 he played on the European Tour, having come through all three stages of qualifying school; his best year-end result was 115th on the 2006 Order of Merit. Millar recorded four top-10 finishes on the tour, with a best finish of joint-fourth place in the 2007 New Zealand Open.

Millar qualified for the 2011 Open Championship through International Final Qualifying, his only appearance in a major championship. He made the cut and finished in 63rd place.

Since 2010 has played primarily on the PGA Tour of Australasia and the OneAsia tour. He has won twice on the PGA Tour of Australasia, winning the Holden New Zealand PGA Championship in March 2015 and the Rebel Sport Masters in January 2018.

== Professional wins (2) ==
=== PGA Tour of Australasia wins (2) ===
No.	Date	Tournament	Winning score	Margin of victory	Runner(s)-up
1	8 Mar 2015	Holden New Zealand PGA Championship	−18 (68-67-64-71=270)	3 strokes	(Australia) Geoff Drakeford, (New Zealand) Josh Geary, (Australia) Kristopher Mueck
2	14 Jan 2018	Rebel Sport Masters	−11 (72-67-67-67=273)	4 strokes	(New Zealand) David Smail

PGA Tour of Australasia playoff record (0–2)

No.	Year	Tournament	Opponent	Result
1	2016	Oates Vic Open	(New Zealand) Michael Long	Lost to birdie on first extra hole
2	2017	Coca-Cola Queensland PGA Championship	(New Zealand) Daniel Pearce	Lost to par on third extra hole

== Results in major championships ==
Tournament	2011
The Open Championship	T63

Note: Millar only played in The Open Championship.
"T" = tied

== Results in World Golf Championships ==
Tournament	2016	2017	2018	2019
Championship				70
Match Play				
Invitational				
Champions	T68			T67

Did not play

"T" = Tied

== See also ==
- 2005 European Tour Qualifying School graduates
- 2007 European Tour Qualifying School graduates
- 2008 European Tour Qualifying School graduates
