= Momoka Kobori =

New Zealand professional golfer

Personal information
- Nationality: New Zealand
- Born: 21 March 1999 (age 27) Karuizawa, Japan
- Height: 5 ft 3 in (1.60 m)

Career
- Sport: Golf
- College: Pepperdine University
- Turned professional: 2021
- Current tours: Ladies European Tour; WPGA Tour of Australasia
- Former tour: LET Access Series
- Professional wins: 5

Number of wins by tour
- WPGA Tour of Australasia: 2
- Other: 3

Best results in LPGA major championships
- Chevron Championship: DNP
- Women's PGA C'ship: DNP
- U.S. Women's Open: DNP
- Women's British Open: CUT: 2025
- Evian Championship: DNP

Achievements and awards
- West Coast Conference Freshman of the Year: 2017

Momoka Kobori (born 21 March 1999) is a New Zealand professional golfer and Ladies European Tour player. She has two WPGA Tour of Australasia titles, including the 2023 Women's NSW Open, and two LET Access Series titles in Europe.

== Early life and amateur career ==
Kobori was born in Karuizawa, Japan and moved to Canterbury, New Zealand with her family when she was eight. Her younger brother Kazuma is also a golfer. He won the New Zealand PGA Championship on the PGA Tour of Australasia as an amateur.

Kobori was a member of the New Zealand national golf academy, and won the 2014 and 2015 Liz Douglas Trophy for the lowest women's stroke average in Canterbury. In 2015, she was runner-up at the Srixon International Junior Classic in Australia and won four times: the U16 Victorian Junior Masters, the Faldo Series Asia New Zealand Qualifying event, the South Island Stroke Play Championship, and the South Island U19 Championship.

In 2016, she won the Queensland Girls Amateur and defended her title at the South Island Stroke Play Championship. She was runner-up at the Australian Girls' Amateur and the Muriwai Open. She made the cut at the 2016 New Zealand Women's Open, a Ladies European Tour co-sanctioned event.

Kobori graduated from Rangiora High School in New Zealand in 2015. She attended Pepperdine University near Malibu, California and played with the Pepperdine Waves women's golf team 2016–2020. She was West Coast Conference Freshman of the Year in 2017 and an All-American as a senior in 2020. She graduated with a degree in sports medicine.

== Professional career ==
Kobori turned professional in January 2021 and soon finished tied for first at the two-day 36-hole Whitford Park Pro-Am in Auckland at eight-under.

In 2022, Kobori played on the WPGA Tour of Australasia where she was runner-up female at the TPS Victoria and TPS Murray River before placing first at the TPS Hunter Valley in March, losing a playoff to Aaron Pike for the overall title.

Kobori then finished T14 at the Australian Ladies Classic – Bonville and T12 at the Women's NSW Open, both Ladies European Tour co-sanctioned events, before turning her attention to the LET Access Series where she finished runner-up once and won twice in her first four starts. She finished 3rd on the 2022 LETAS Order of Merit to secure an LET card for 2023.

In 2023, she won the Women's NSW Open, an WPGA Tour of Australasia event, in a playoff.

== Amateur wins ==
- 2015 South Island Stroke Play Championship, South Island U19 Championship
- 2016 South Island Stroke Play Championship, Queensland Girls Amateur, Victorian Junior Masters
- 2019 Branch Law Firm-Dick McGuire Invitational
- 2020 Muriwai Open

== Professional wins (5) ==
=== WPGA Tour of Australasia wins (2) ===
No.	Date	Tournament	Winning score	To par	Margin of victory	Runner-up
1	13 Mar 2022	TPS Hunter Valley	64-69-67=200	−8	3 strokes	(Australia) Cassie Porter
2	26 Mar 2023	Women's NSW Open	70-70-71=211	−8	Playoff	(Australia) Claire Shin (a)

=== LET Access Series wins (2) ===
No.	Date	Tournament	Winning score	Margin of victory	Runner(s)-up
1	12 Jun 2022	Montauban Ladies Open	−10 (69-69-68=206)	3 strokes	(Scotland) Hannah McCook
2	2 Jul 2022	Hauts de France - Pas de Calais Golf Open	−8 (69-72-70=211)	4 strokes	(Netherlands) Lauren Holmey (a) (Spain) Noemí Jiménez

=== Charles Tour wins (1) ===
- 2021 Whitford Park Pro-Am (tie)

== Results in LPGA majors ==
Tournament	2025
Chevron Championship	
U.S. Women's Open	
Women's PGA Championship	
The Evian Championship	
Women's British Open	CUT

Did not play

CUT = missed the half-way cut

== Team appearances ==
Amateur

- New Zealand Interprovincial (representing Canterbury): 2015 (winners), 2020
- The Spirit International Amateur Golf Championship (representing New Zealand): 2019
