= Brisbane Golf Club =

18-hole golf course in Tennyson Memorial Avenue

Coordinates: 27.5277°S 153.0086°E

- Interactive map of Brisbane Golf Club

Club information
- Location: Yeerongpilly, Queensland
- Type: private
- Website: https://brisbanegolfclub.com.au/

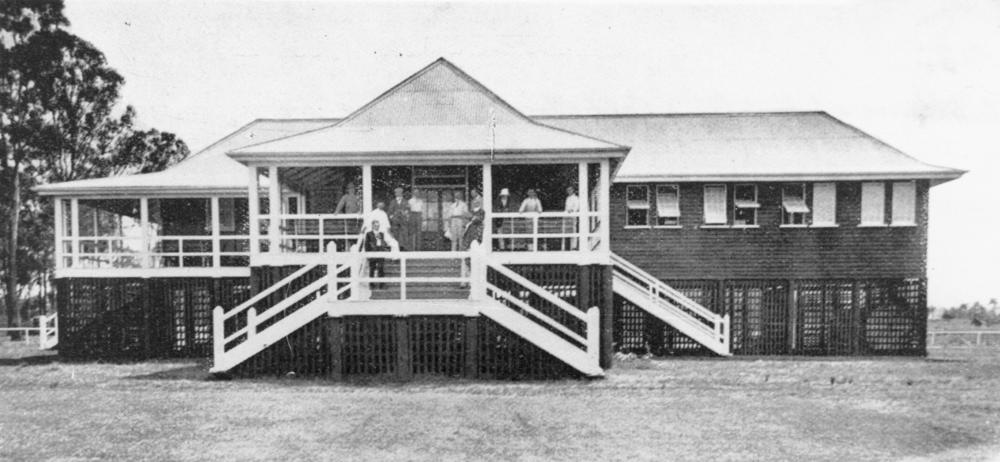
Club house of the Brisbane Golf Club, Yeerongpilly, 1910

Brisbane Golf Club is an 18-hole golf course in Tennyson Memorial Avenue, Yeerongpilly, Queensland in the City of Brisbane, Queensland, Australia.

== History ==
The golf course was originally established in Chelmer with an official opening on Saturday 12 December 1896 by the Queensland Governor Lord Lamington. In 1903 the course relocated to its current site, a larger piece of land in Yeerongpilly in 1903.
