= Alice Springs Golf Course =

Golf course in Alice Springs, Northern Territory

Coordinates: 23.7139902°S 133.88242°E

Alice Springs Golf and Bowls Club
- Interactive map of Alice Springs Golf and Bowls Club

Club information
- Location: Desert Springs, Northern Territory
- Established: 1985; 41 years ago
- Type: private
- Website: https://alicespringsgolfclub.com.au/

Alice Springs Golf Club is a golf club in Australia. It is located in Desert Springs, Northern Territory. It was formed in 1985. It has hosted several notable golf tournaments.

The Alice Springs Golf Course, an 18-hole championship layout golf course designed by the architects Thomson Wolveridge, was opened in 1985 by a challenge match between top professionals Greg Norman and Johnny Miller. The course record of 64 is held jointly by, amateur members, Leigh Shacklady and Kerryn Heaver, beating professional Stuart Appleby's 65. Adam Scott won the Australian Boys' Amateur Championship held there in 1997.
