= List of music venues in Oceania =

This is a list of music venues in Oceania. Venues with a capacity of 1,000 or higher are included.

== List ==
=== Australia ===
Opened	Venue	City	Capacity
New South Wales
Unknown	Carrington Park	Bathurst	~20,063
June 1992	Newcastle Entertainment Centre	Broadmeadow	7,528
June 1994	Coffs Harbour International Stadium	Coffs Harbour	20,000
1909	Enmore Theatre	Enmore	2,200
2004	Big Top	Milsons Point	3,000
14 April 1924	Hordern Pavilion	Moore Park	5,500
2022	Sydney Football Stadium	Moore Park	45,000
1851	Sydney Cricket Ground	Moore Park	48,000
1929	Newcastle Civic Theatre	Newcastle	1,520
10 April 1970	Newcastle International Sports Centre	New Lambton	33,000
14 April 2019	Western Sydney Stadium	Parramatta	30,000
Unknown	Sydney Event Centre	Pyrmont	3,000
1994	Metro Theatre	Sydney	1,700
12 December 2016	TikTok Entertainment Centre	Sydney	9,000
4 October 1999	Afterpay Arena	Sydney	21,000
6 March 1999	Stadium Australia	Sydney	83,000
5 September 1998	Wollongong Entertainment Centre	Wollongong	5,000
1911	Wollongong Showground	Wollongong	23,750
Victoria
1929	Regent Theatre	Melbourne	2,162
1929	The Forum	Melbourne	3,371
May 1915	Festival Hall	Melbourne	5,445
11 January 1988	Margaret Court Arena	Melbourne	7,500
2000	John Cain Arena	Melbourne	11,000
1959	Sidney Myer Music Bowl	Melbourne	12,030
11 January 1988	Rod Laver Arena	Melbourne	16,800
7 May 2010	Melbourne Rectangular Stadium	Melbourne	30,050
9 March 2000	Marvel Stadium	Melbourne	63,378
1853	Melbourne Cricket Ground	Melbourne	100,024
Unknown	Hanging Rock Reserve	Woodend	~20,163
11 November 1927	Palais Theatre	St Kilda	2,896
5 June 2009	Plenary Hall	South Wharf	5,564
Queensland
2007	Sunshine Coast Stadium	Bokarina	20,000
20 February 1986	Brisbane Entertainment Centre	Boondall	14,500
6 June 1995	Brisbane Convention & Exhibition Centre	Brisbane	4,000
7 September 1989	Riverstage	Brisbane	9,500
29 June 2004	Gold Coast Convention & Exhibition Centre	Broadbeach	6,000
1886	Brisbane Showgrounds	Bowen Hills	25,490
26 June 1996	Cairns Convention Centre	Cairns City	5,300
19 April 1987	Carrara Stadium	Carrara	50,000
1982	Chandler Arena	Chandler	2,700
1918	The Tivoli	Fortitude Valley	1,560
6 July 2019	Fortitude Music Hall	Fortitude Valley	3,000
20 August 2011	Stadium Mackay	Mackay	30,000
Unknown	Maryborough Showgrounds	Maryborough West	10,000
1914	Lang Park	Milton	60,000
1975	Queensland Sport and Athletics Centre	Nathan	48,500
1895	The Gabba	Woolloongabba	60,000
1957	Cazaly's Stadium	Westcourt	15,000
22 February 2020	North Queensland Stadium	Railway Estate	25,000
February 2008	Robina Stadium	Robina	40,000
5 April 1989	Fankhauser Reserve	Southport	37,000
1993	Townsville Entertainment & Convention Centre	Townsville	5,200
Western Australia
1994	Arena Joondalup	Joondalup	16,000
30 December 1985	Crown Theatre	Burswood	2,310
21 January 2018	Perth Stadium	Burswood	70,000
1986	Perth High Performance Centre	Mount Claremont	5,800
24 December 1904	His Majesty's Theatre	Perth	1,263
August 2004	Riverside Theatre	Perth	2,500
10 November 2012	Perth Arena	Perth	15,500
1910	Perth Rectangular Stadium	Perth	32,000
South Australia
4 April 1992	Adelaide Arena	Findon	8,000
20 July 1991	Adelaide Entertainment Centre Theatre	Hindmarsh	3,000
20 July 1991	Adelaide Entertainment Centre Arena	Hindmarsh	12,000
1960	Hindmarsh Stadium	Hindmarsh	16,500
1844	Botanic Park	Adelaide	Unknown
15 September 2022	Hindley Street Music Hall	Adelaide	1,800
1871	Adelaide Oval	Adelaide	57,084
June 11, 1928	Thebarton Theatre	Torrensville	2,000
Tasmania
1989	Derwent Entertainment Centre	Glenorchy	8,000
6 May 1922	North Hobart Oval	Hobart	10,000
1851	NTCA Ground	Launceston	10,000
1985	Silverdome	Prospect	5,000
1921	York Park	Invermay	25,157
Australian Capital Territory
26 January 1981	AIS Arena	Bruce	4,264
29 October 1977	Canberra Stadium	Bruce	25,011
1989	Royal Theatre	Civic	2,460
Northern Territory
2002	Alice Springs Convention Centre	Desert Springs	1,200
2008	Darwin Convention Centre	Darwin	4,000
June 1886	Gardens Amphitheatre	Darwin	7,000
Unknown	Marrara Hockey Centre	Marrara	5,000
1991	Marrara Oval	Marrara	12,215

=== Fiji ===
Opened	Venue	City	Capacity
Unknown	FMF Gymnasium	Suva	2,000
2003	Vodafone Arena	Suva	5,000
1951	ANZ National Stadium	Suva	30,000

=== New Zealand ===
Opened	Venue	City	Capacity
Unknown	The Powerstation	Auckland	1,000
December 14, 1911	Auckland Town Hall	Auckland	1,529
September 9, 1990	Kiri Te Kanawa Theatre	Auckland	2,139
December 20, 1929	Auckland Civic Theatre	Auckland	2,378
April 16, 2005	Sir Woolf Fisher Arena	Auckland	3,000
September 11, 2004	The Trusts Arena	Auckland	4,901
April 8, 2007	Spark Arena	Auckland	12,000
1929	Western Springs Stadium	Auckland	50,000
c. 1900	Eden Park	Auckland	60,000
1967	Go Media Stadium	Penrose	47,000
April 21, 1888	Trafalgar Park	Nelson	18,000
1912	St. James Theatre	Wellington	1,500
September 16, 1983	Michael Fowler Centre	Wellington	2,209
1995	TSB Arena	Wellington	5,655
1868	Basin Reserve	Wellington	11,600
January 3, 2000	Sky Stadium	Wellington	34,500
1998	Wolfbrook Arena	Christchurch	8,888
March 24, 2012	Apollo Projects Stadium	Christchurch	30,000
March 27, 2026	One New Zealand Stadium	Christchurch	41,000
February 2007	Energy Events Centre	Rotorua	3,500
June 1, 1928	Regent Theatre	Dunedin	1,684
August 5, 2011	Forsyth Barr Stadium	Dunedin	36,000
1992	TSB Stadium	New Plymouth	3,518
1957	Bowl of Brooklands	New Plymouth	18,000
July 1886 (reopened April 1981)	Central Energy Trust Arena	Palmerston North	20,000

== Gallery ==
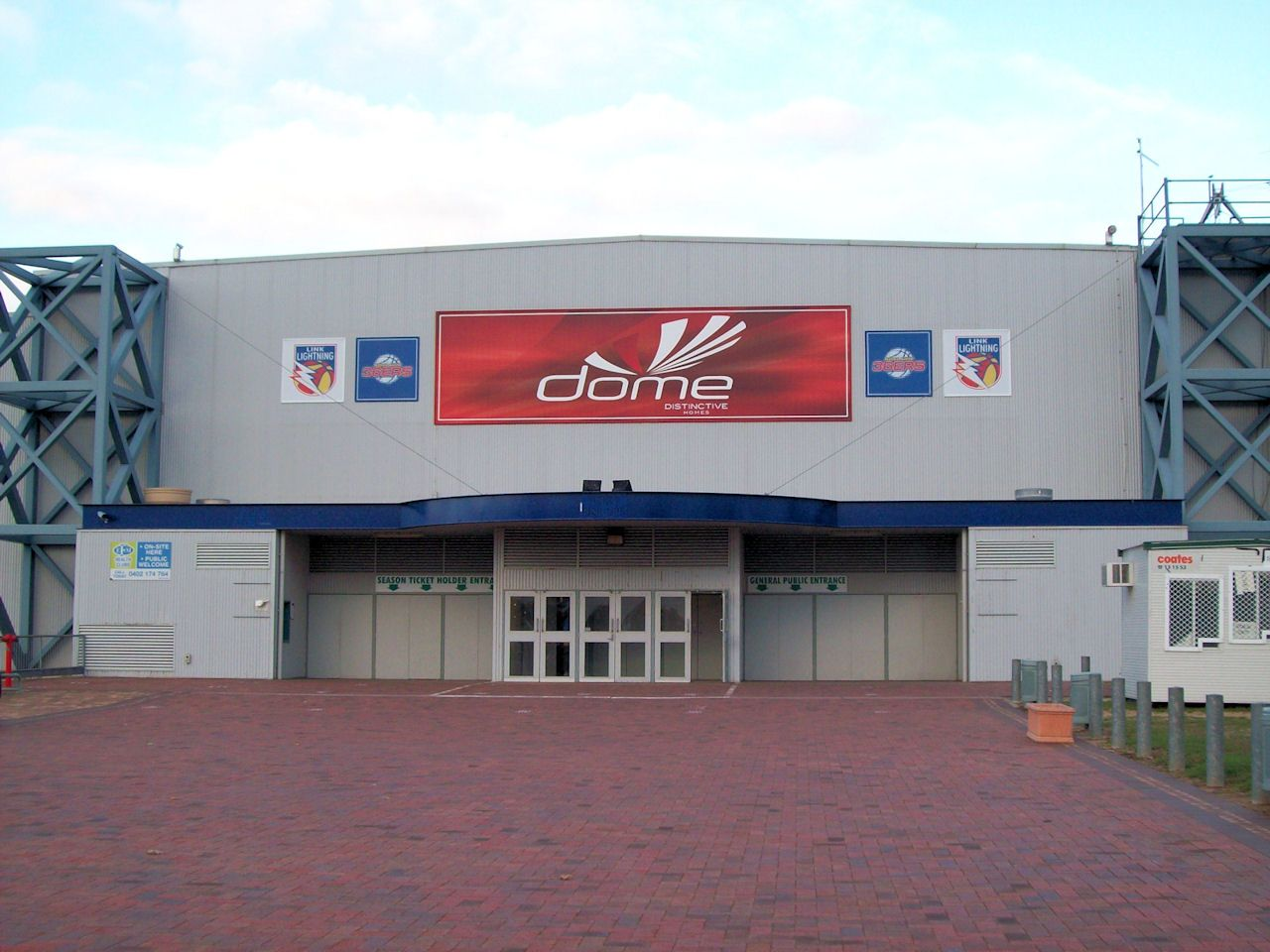
Adelaide Arena

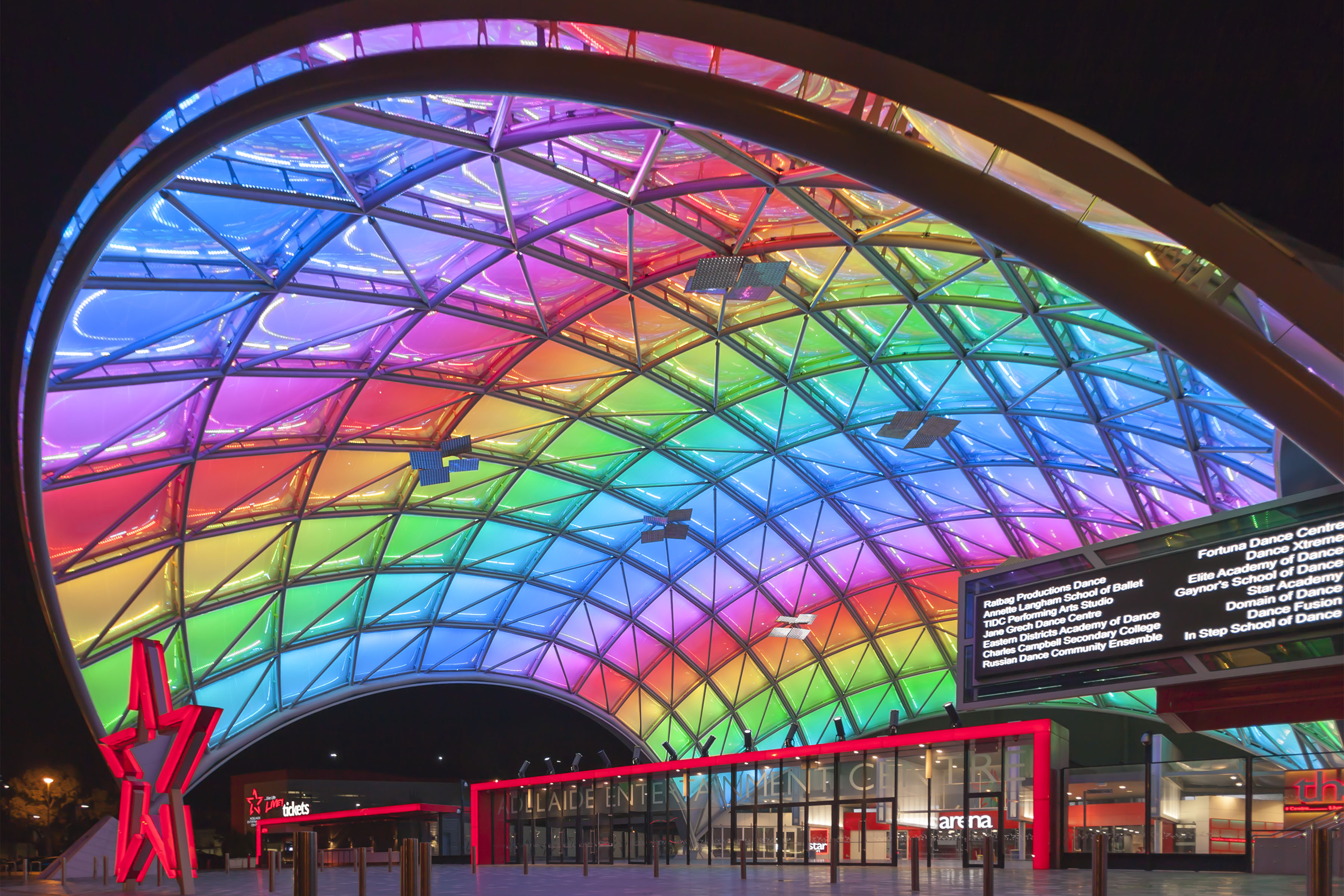
Adelaide Entertainment Centre

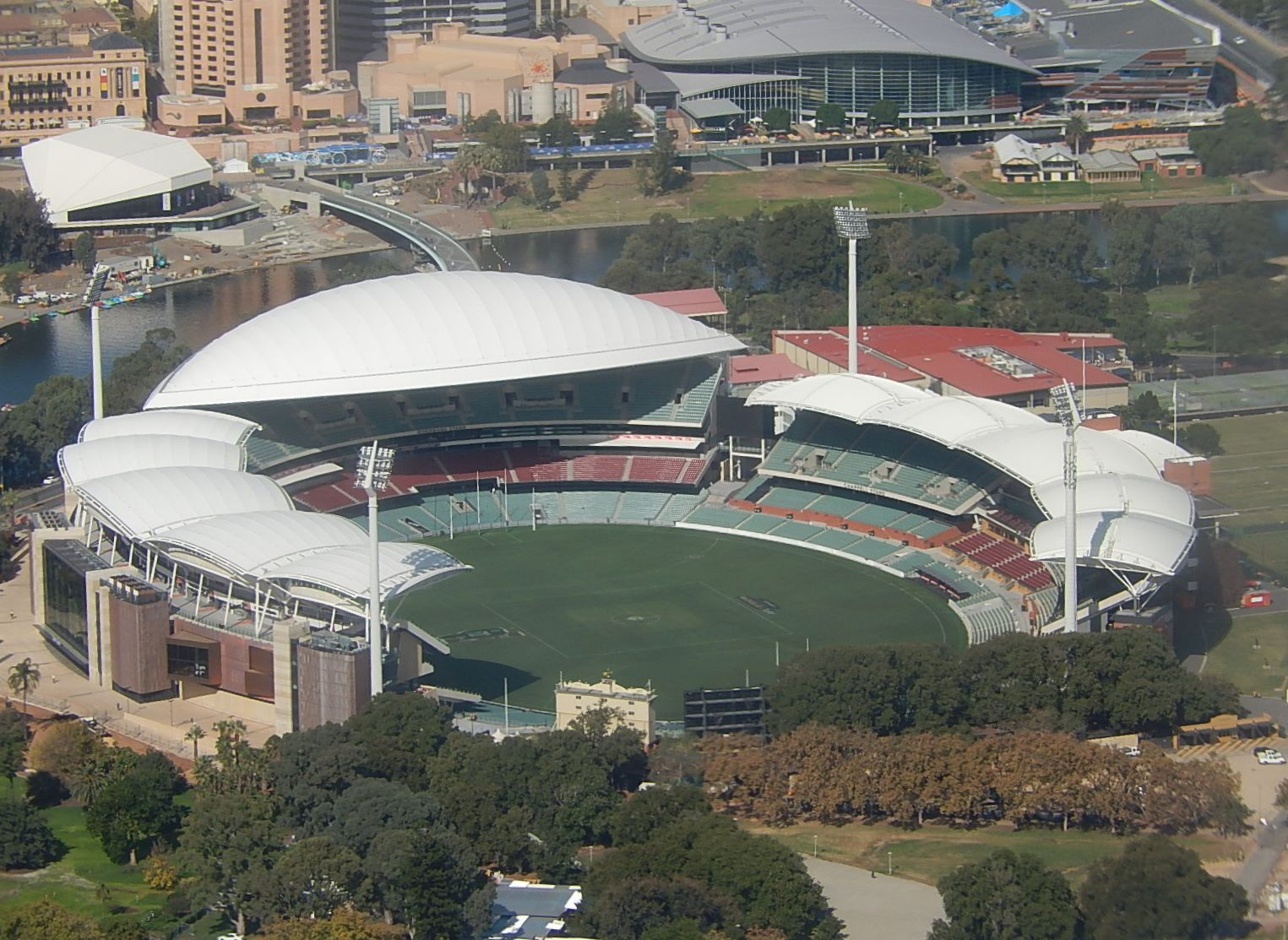
Adelaide Oval

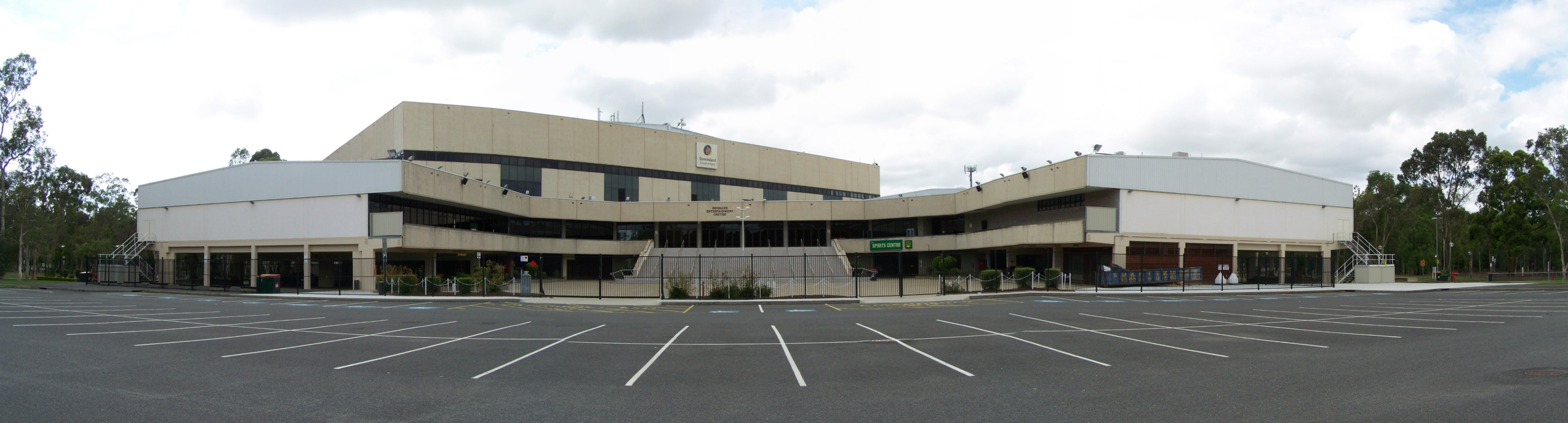
Brisbane Entertainment Centre

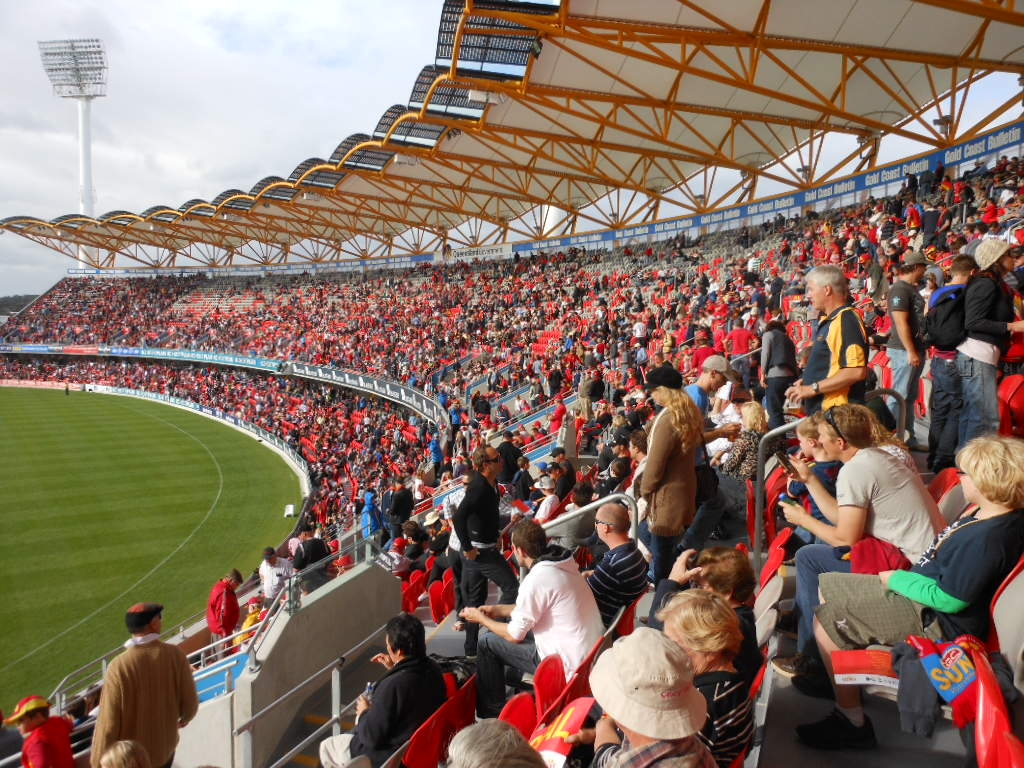
Carrara Stadium

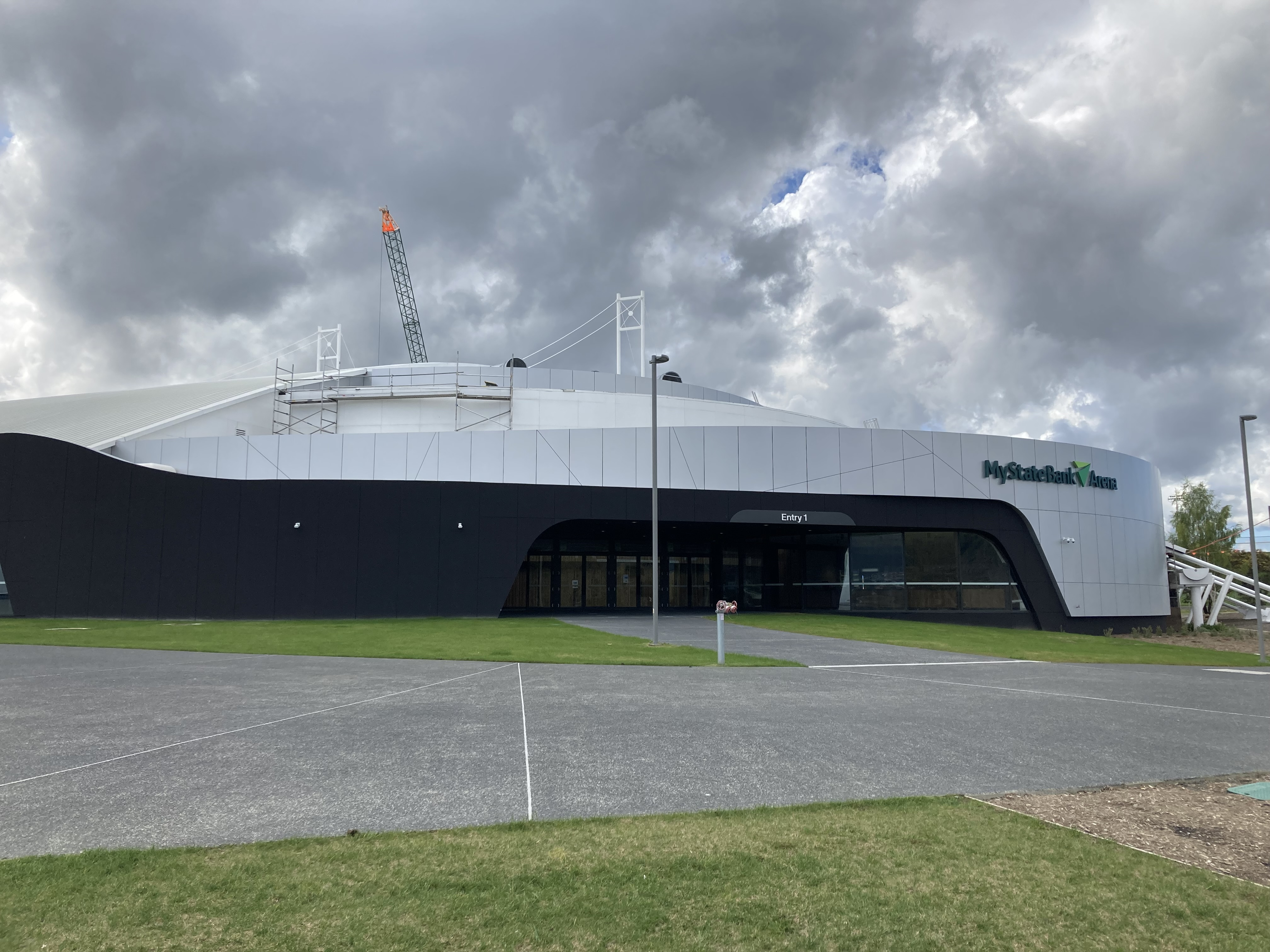
Derwent Entertainment Centre

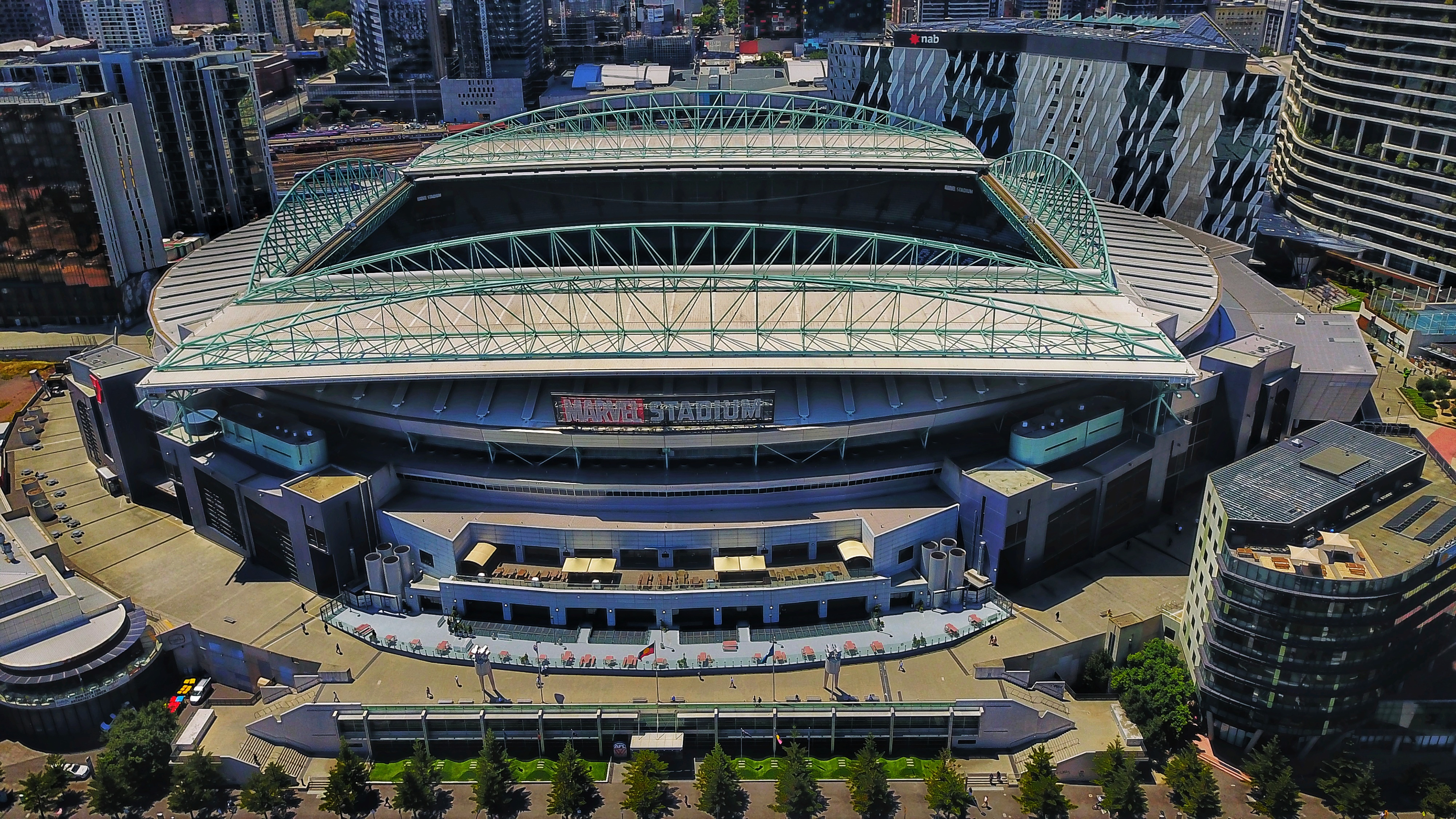
Docklands Stadium

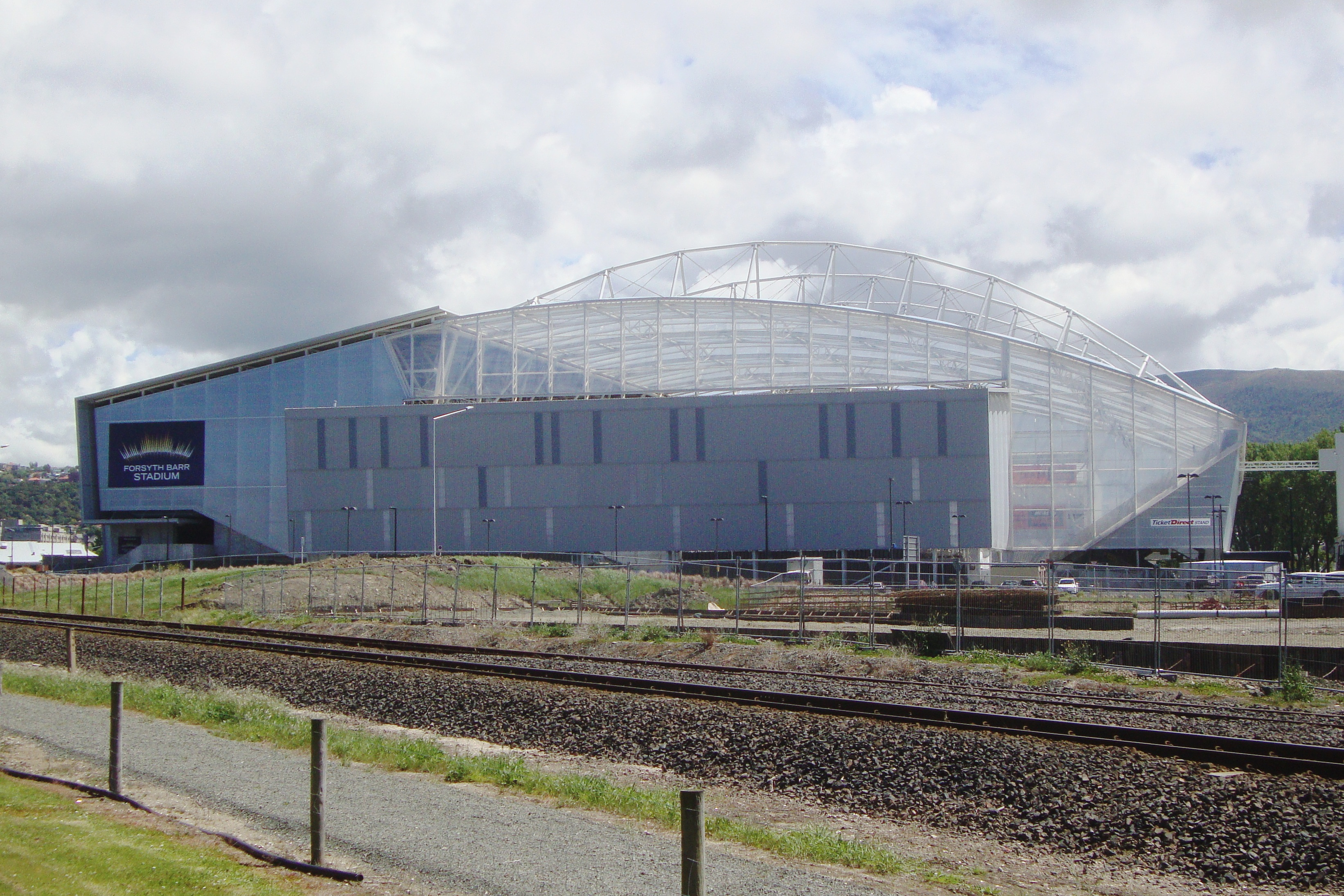
Forsyth Barr Stadium

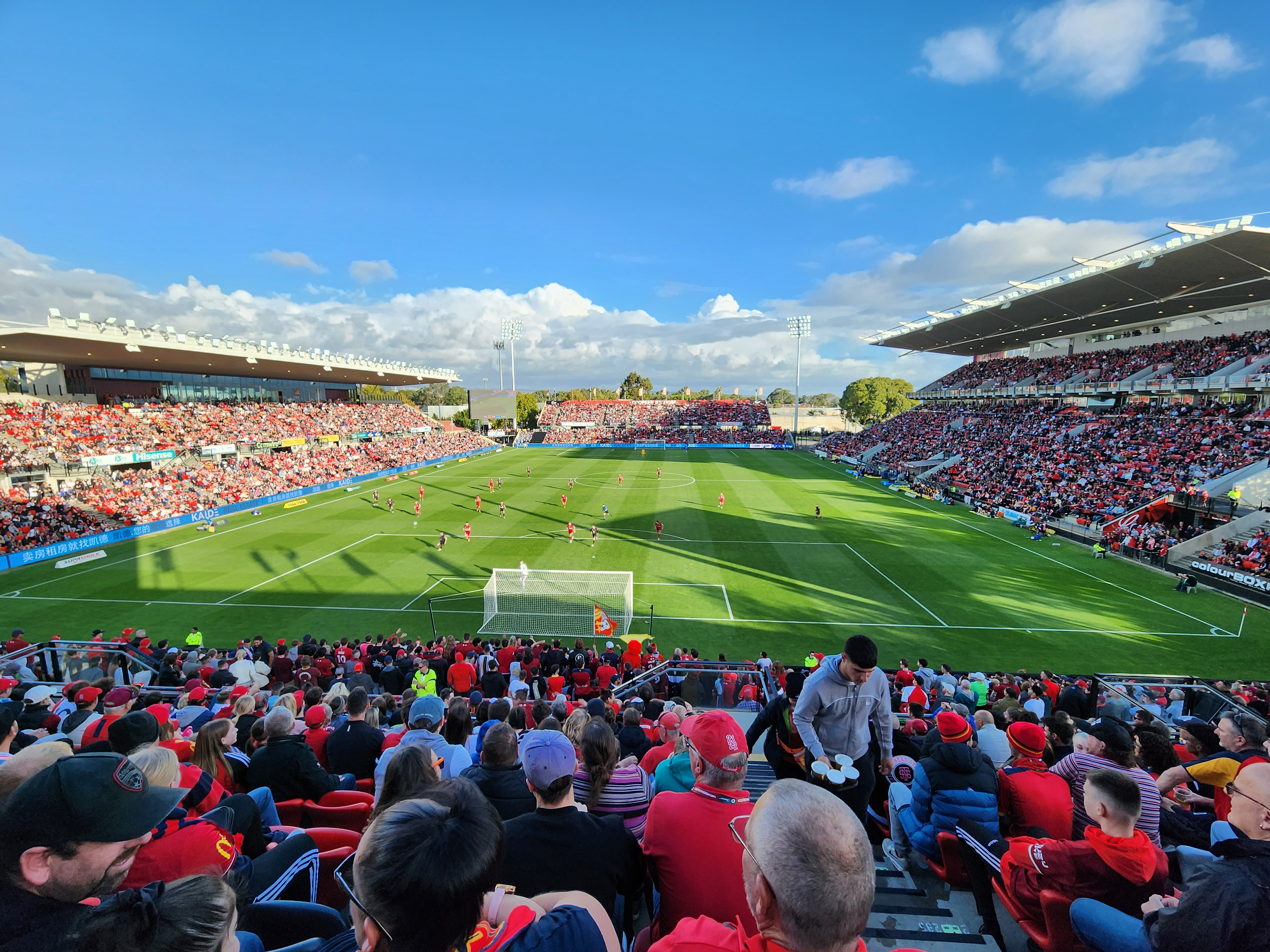
Hindmarsh Stadium

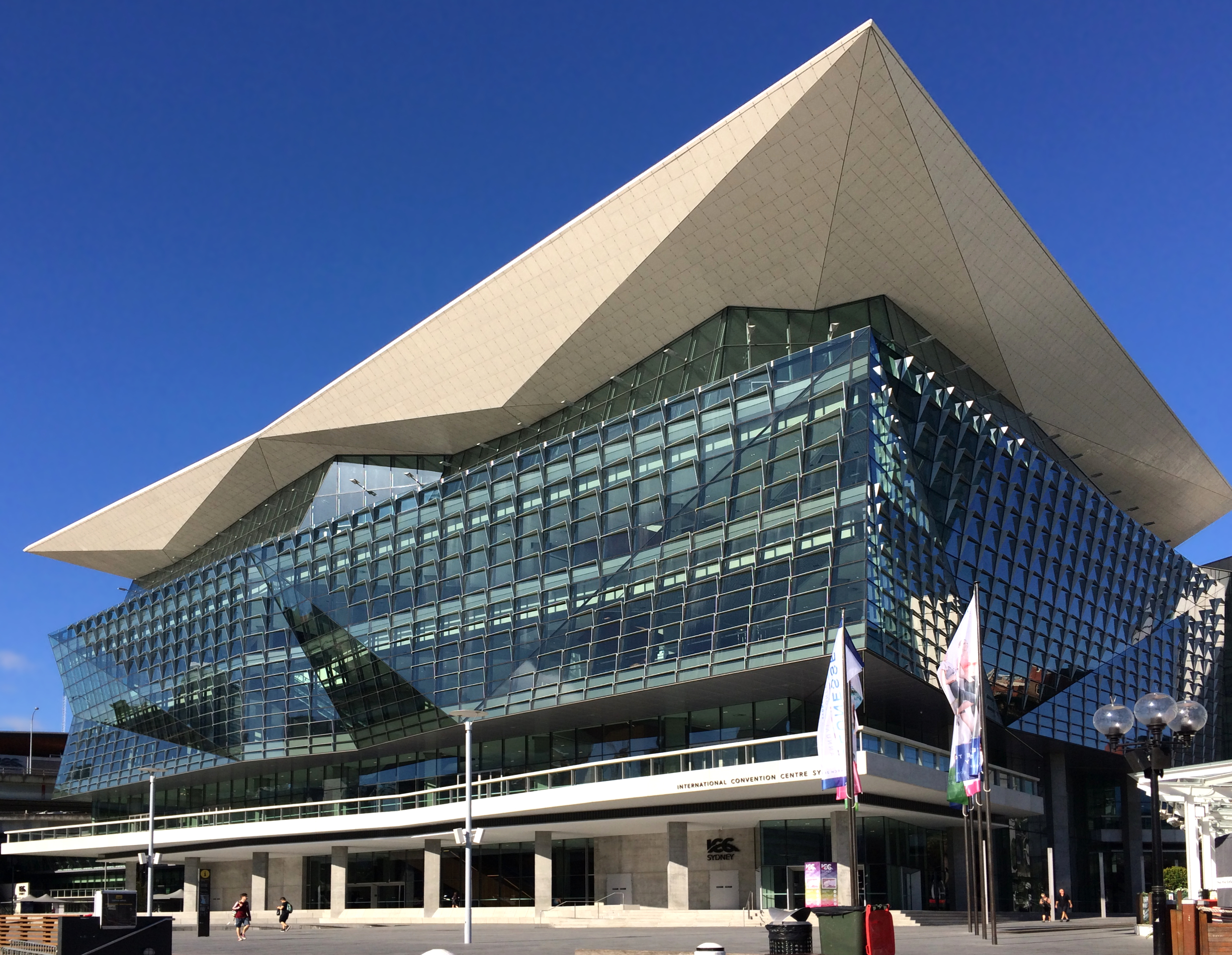
International Convention Centre Sydney

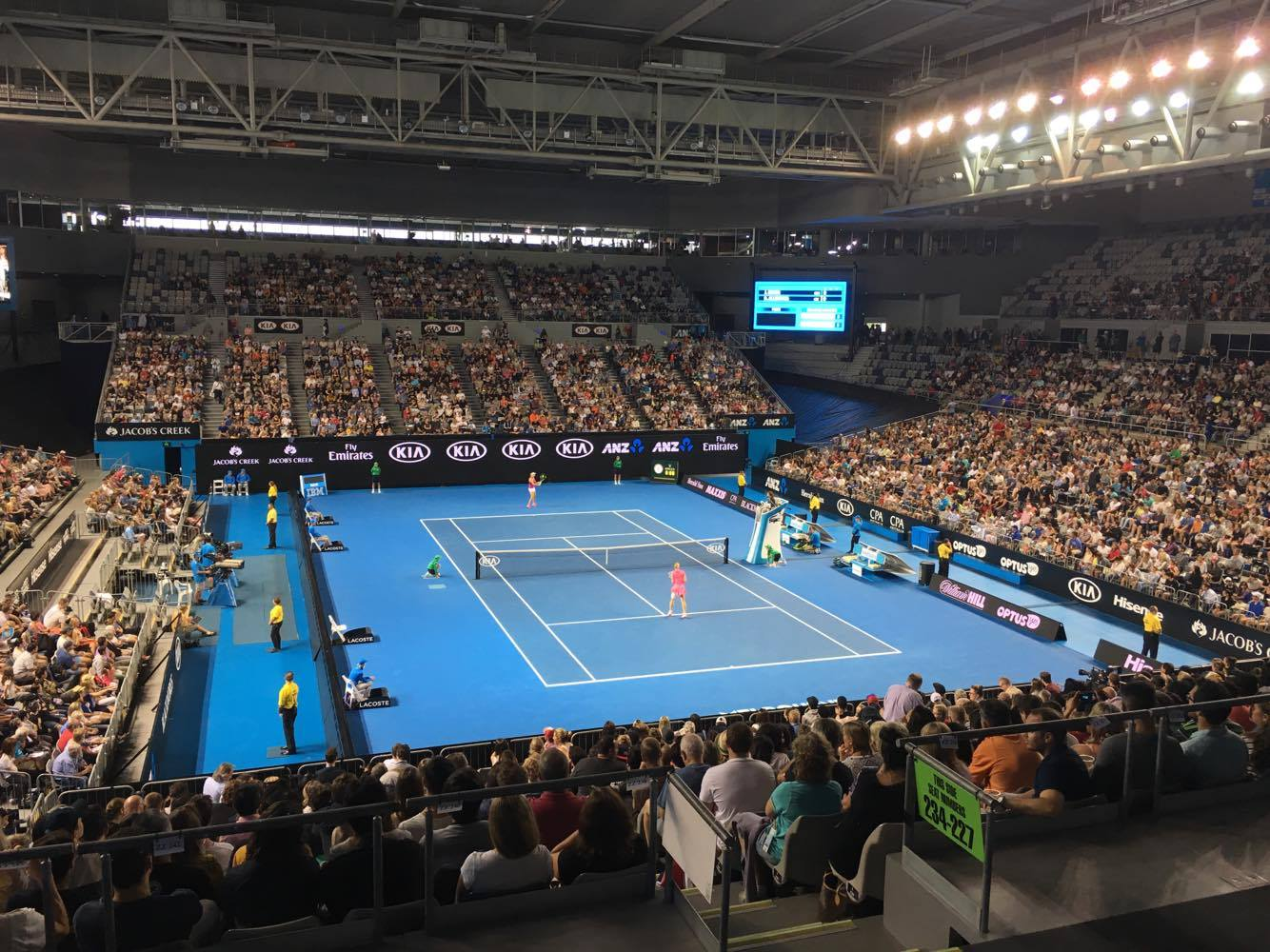
John Cain Arena

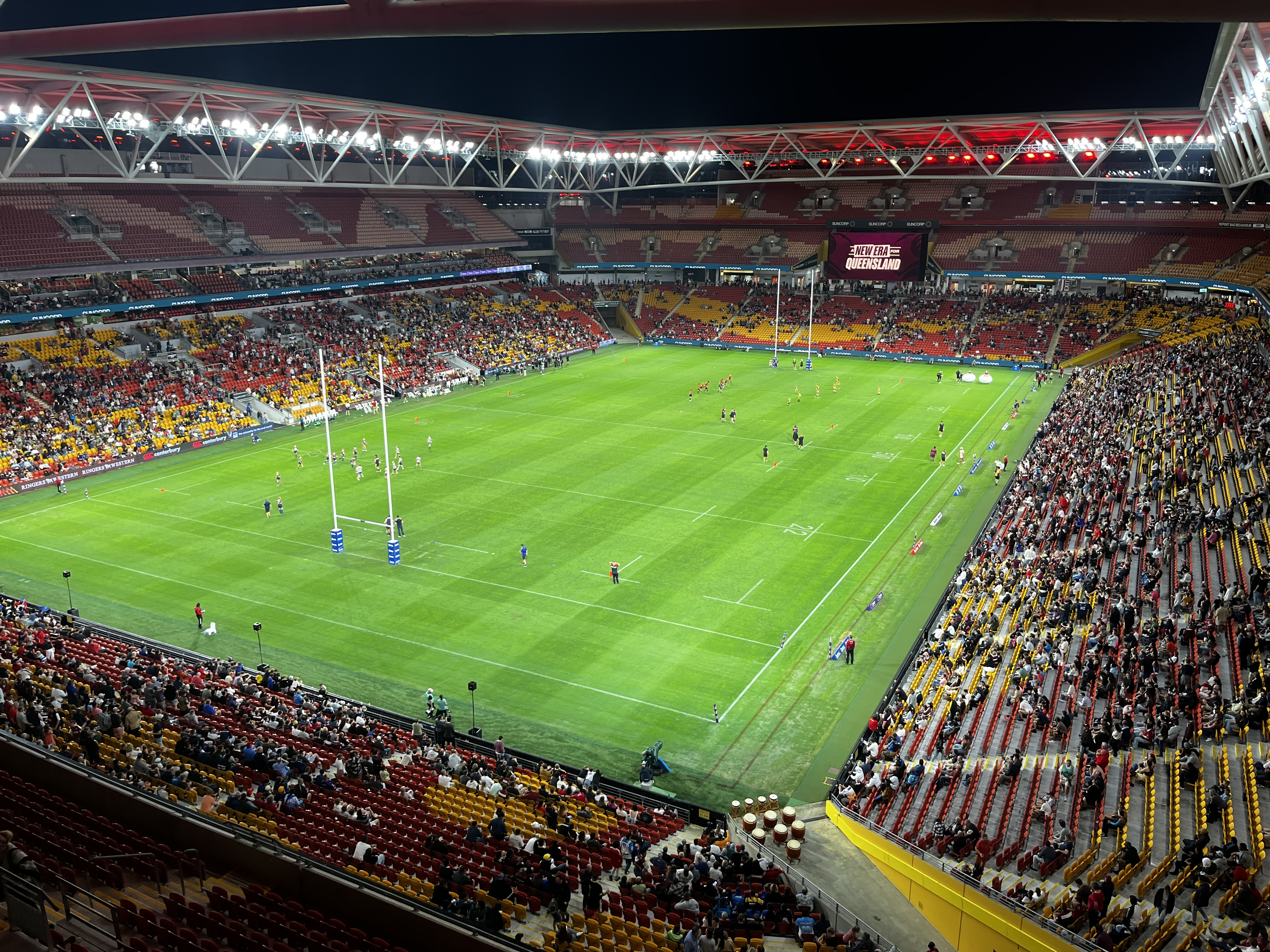
Lang Park

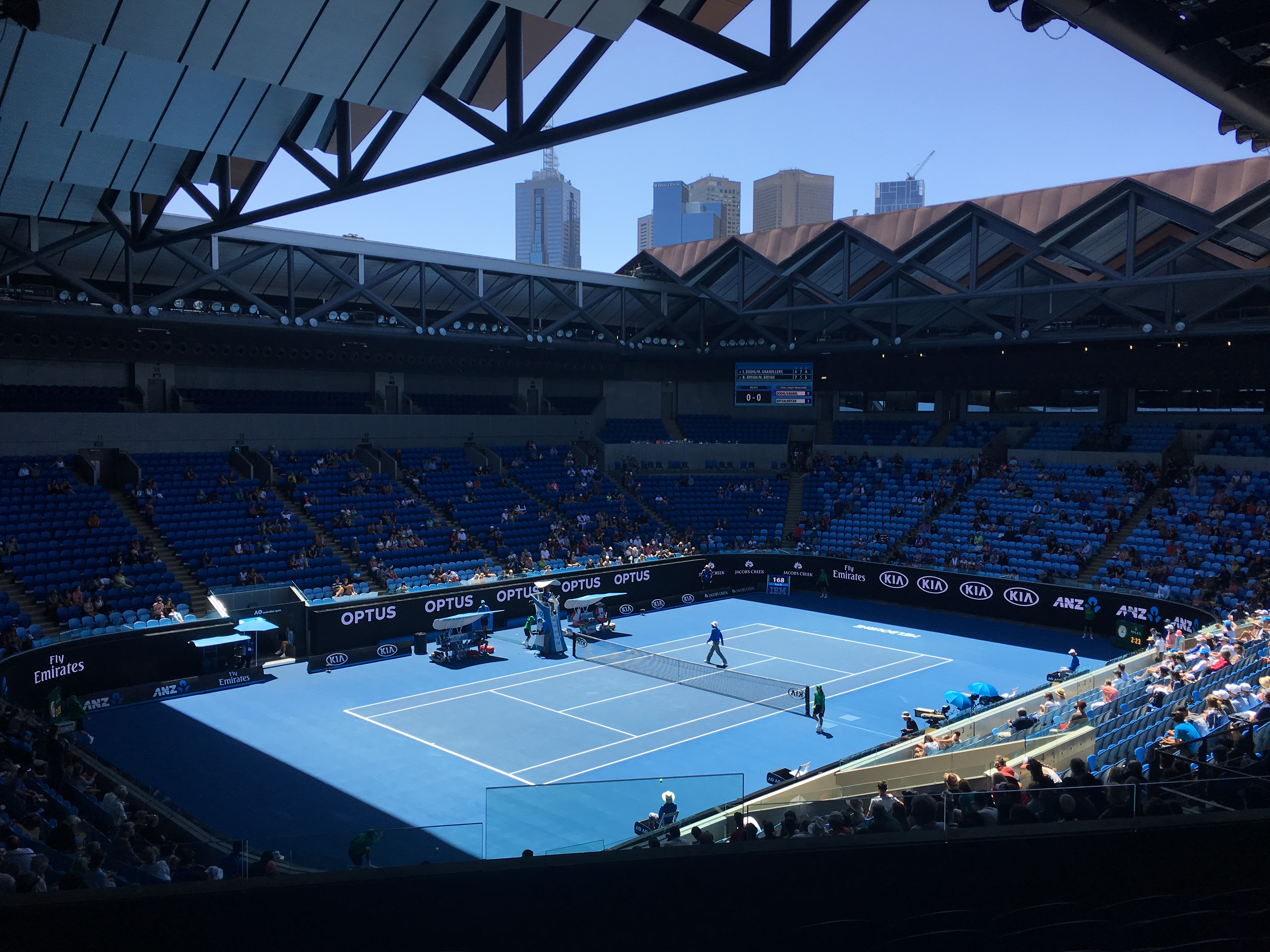
Margaret Court Arena

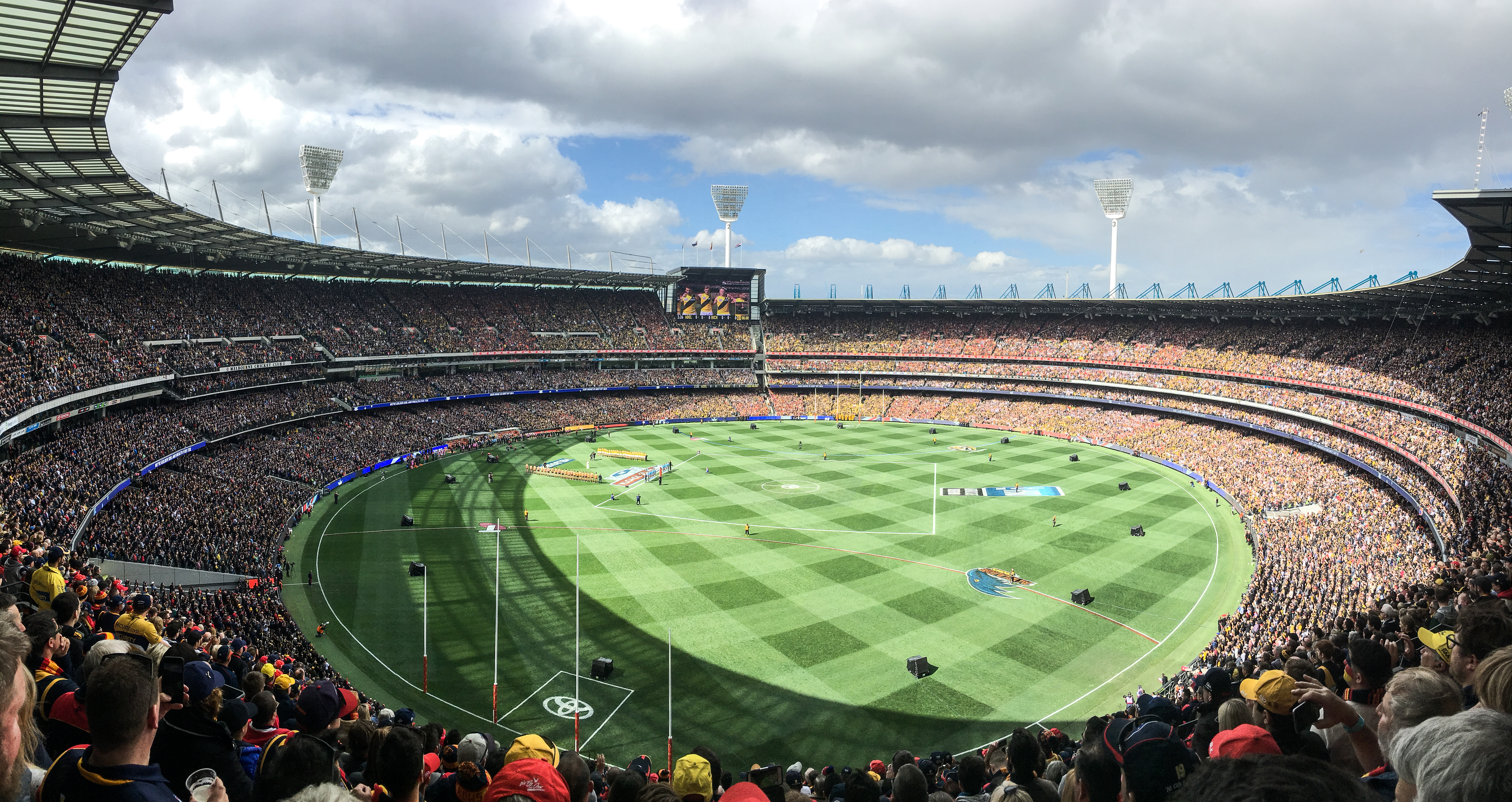
Melbourne Cricket Ground

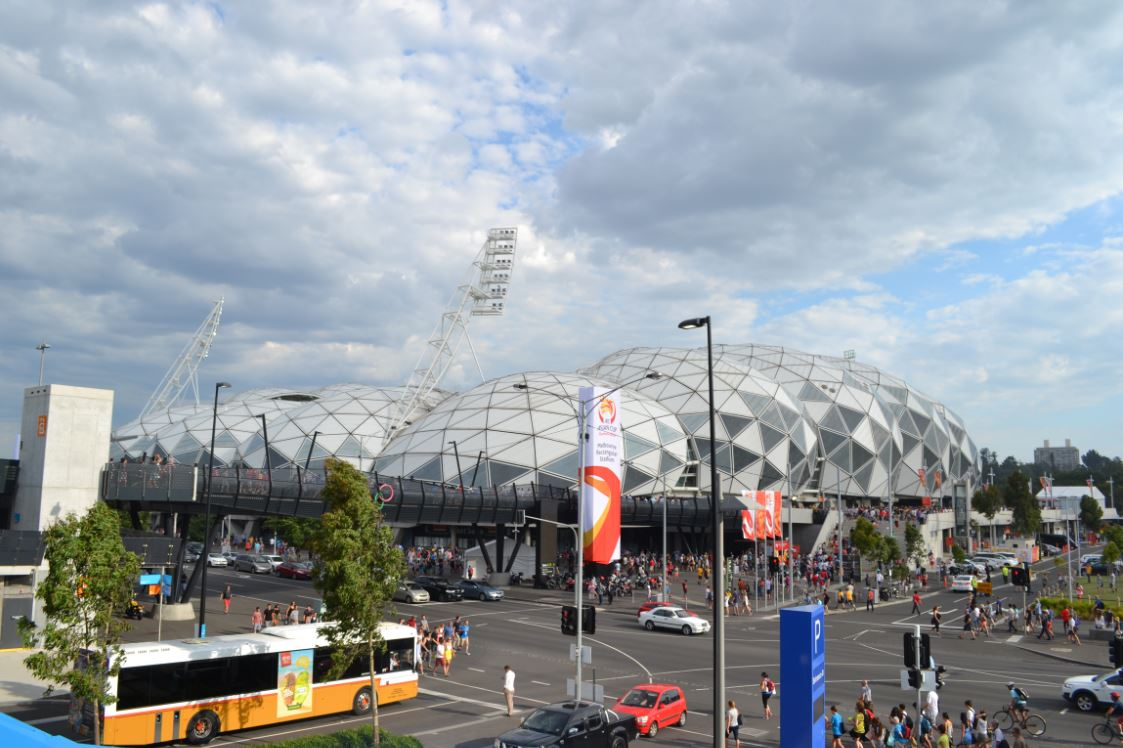
Melbourne Rectangular Stadium

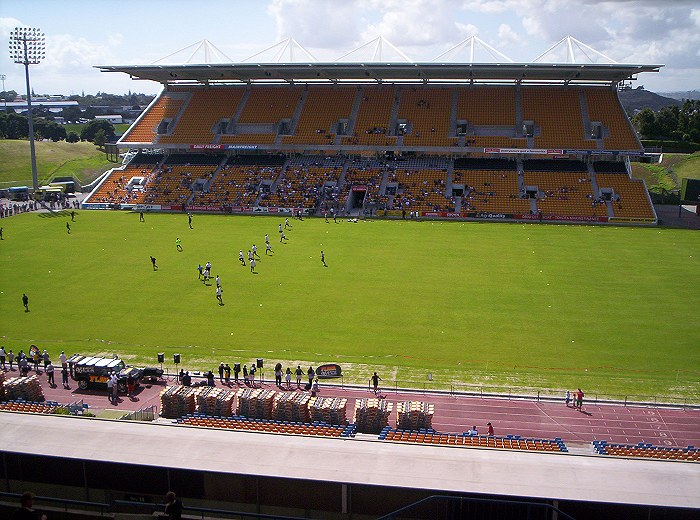
Mount Smart Stadium

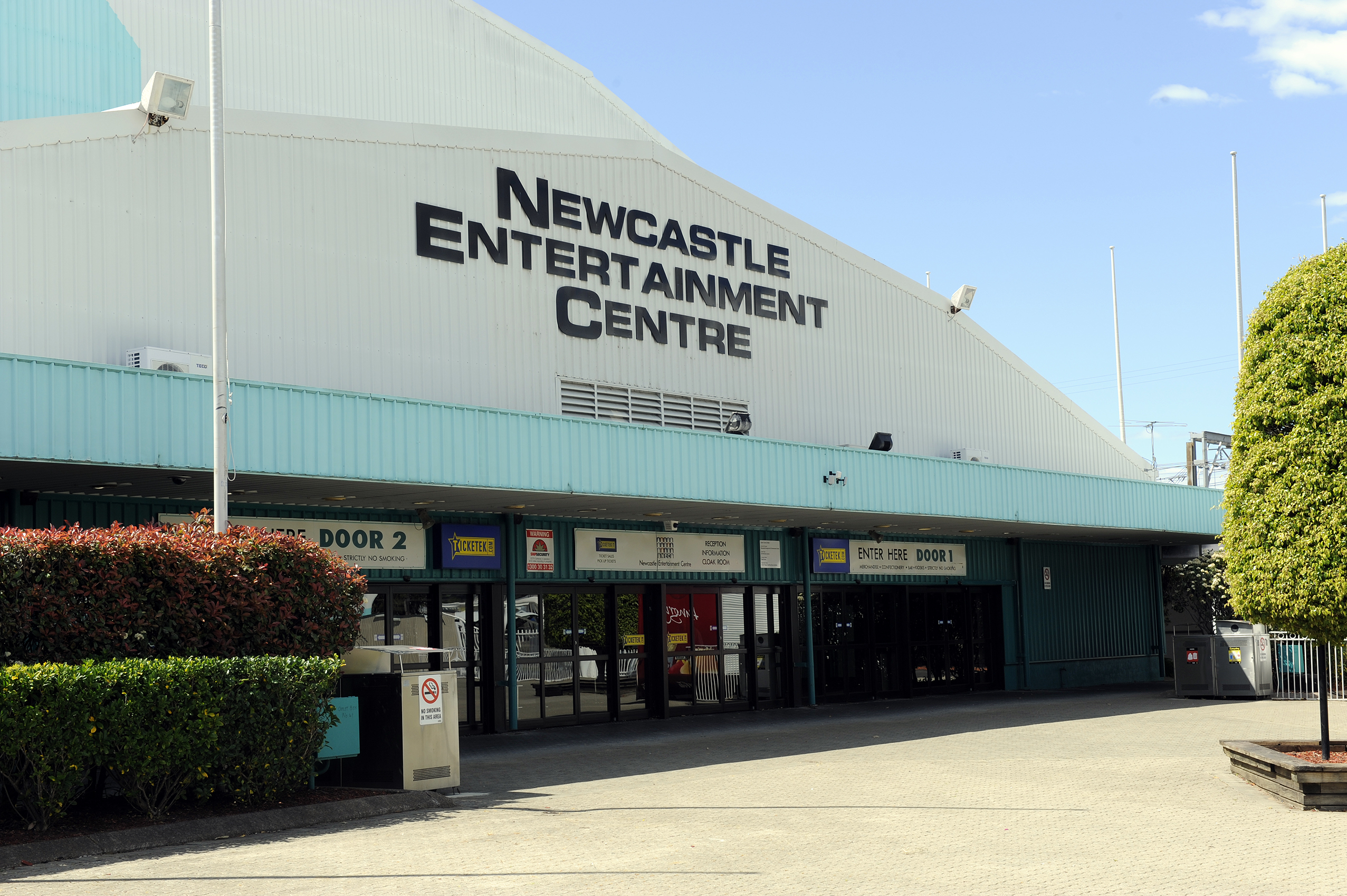
Newcastle Entertainment Centre

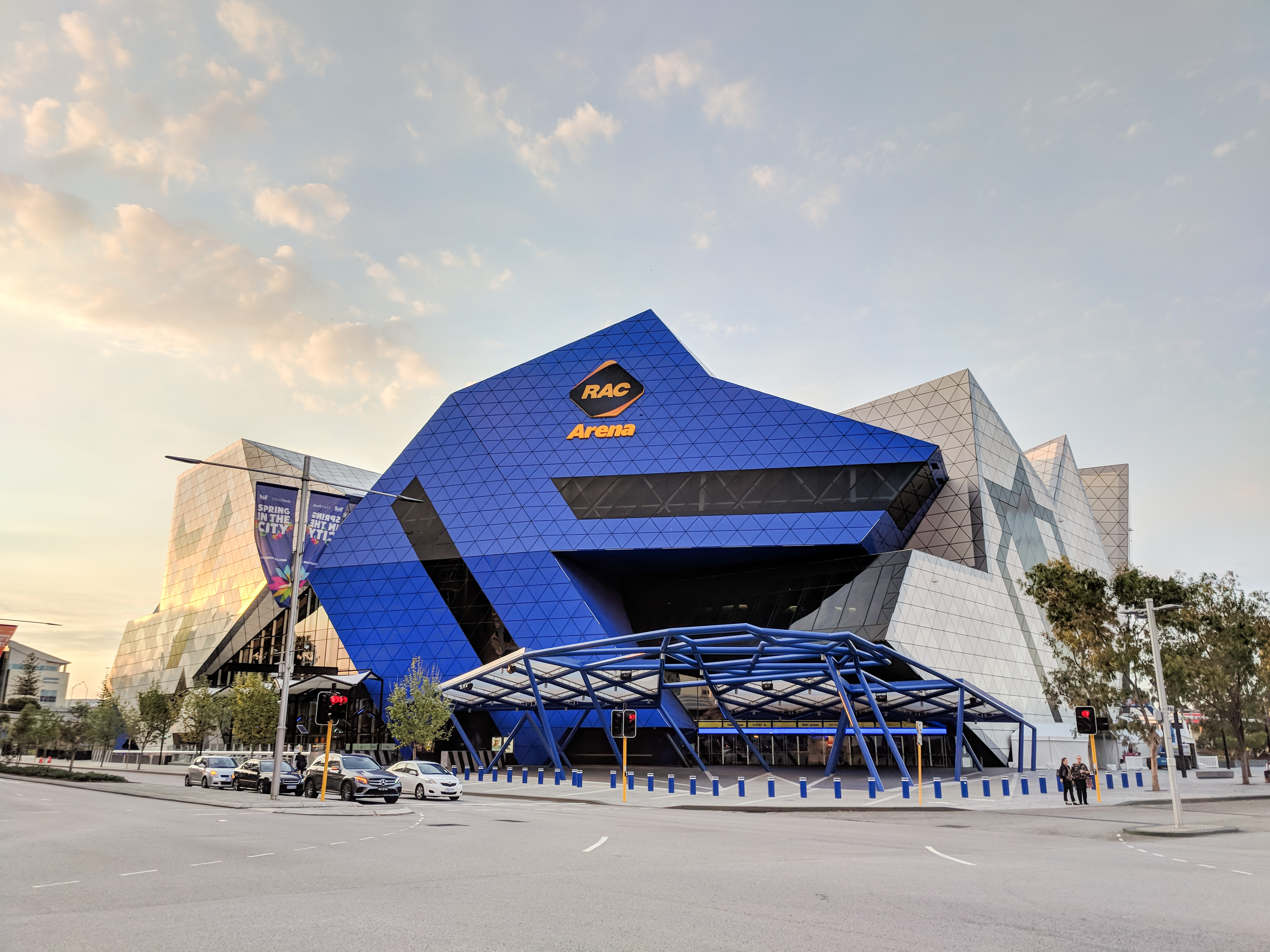
Perth Arena

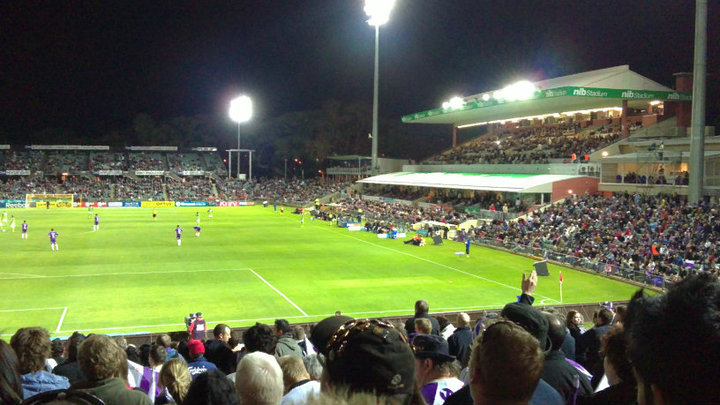
Perth Rectangular Stadium

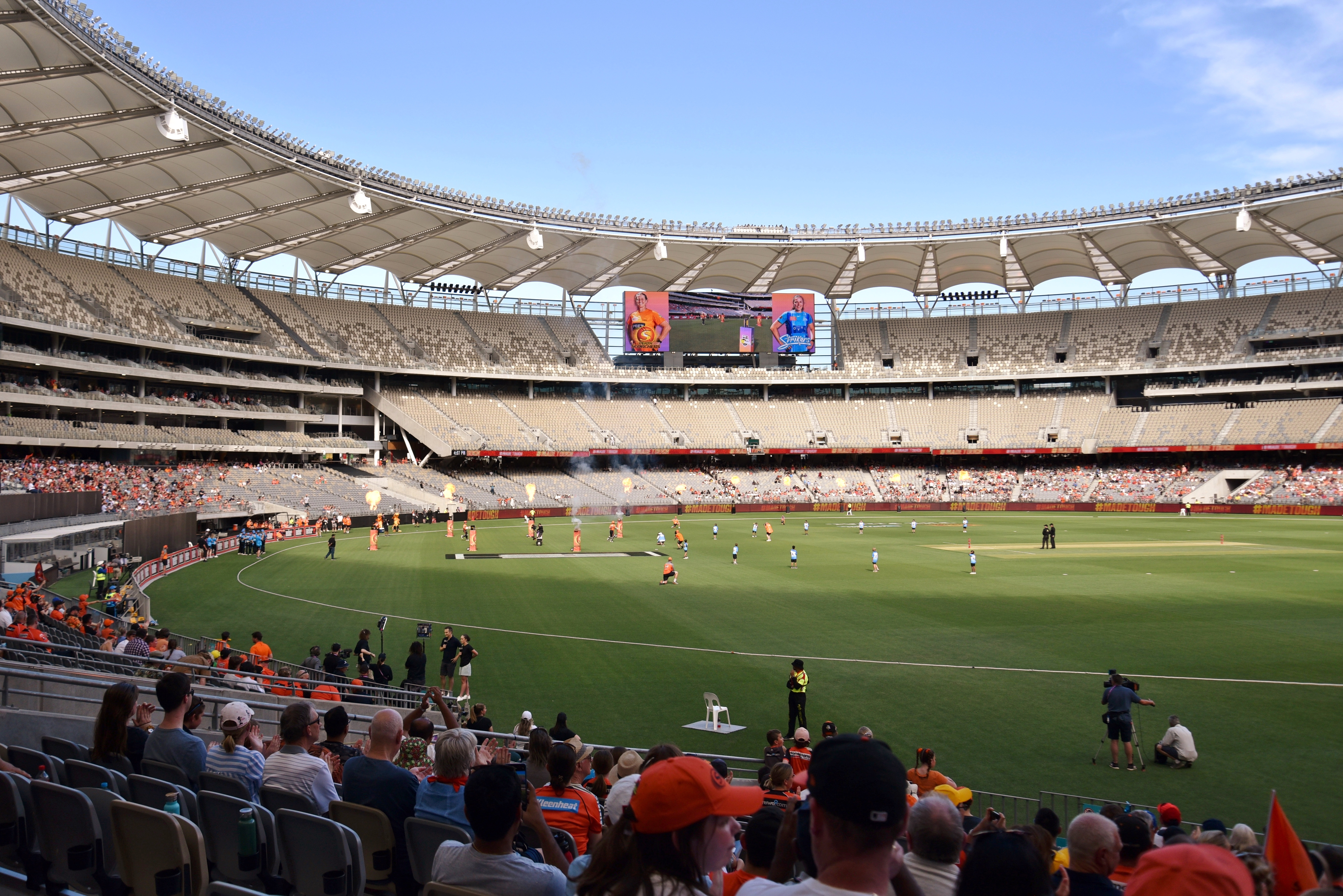
Perth Stadium

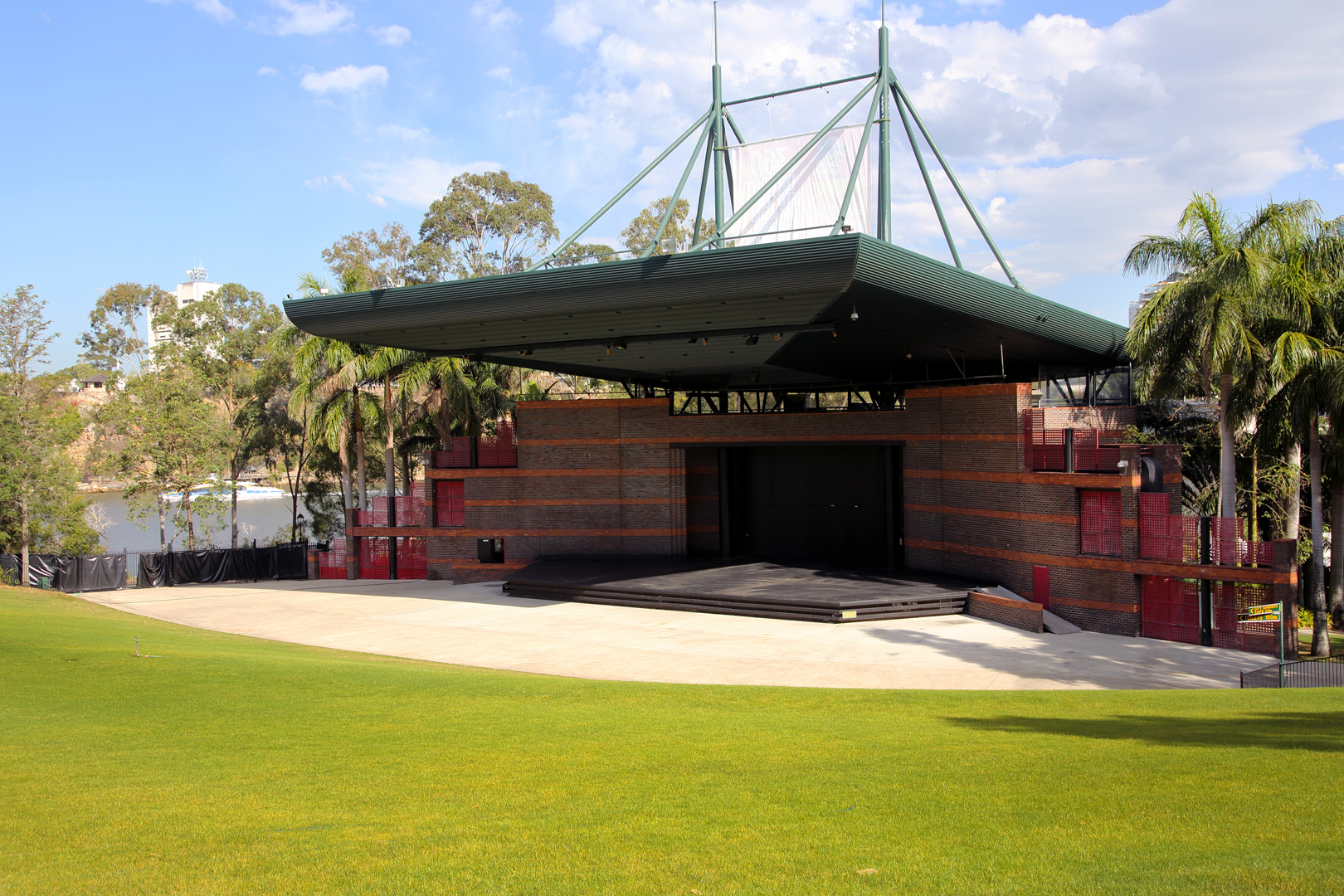
Riverstage

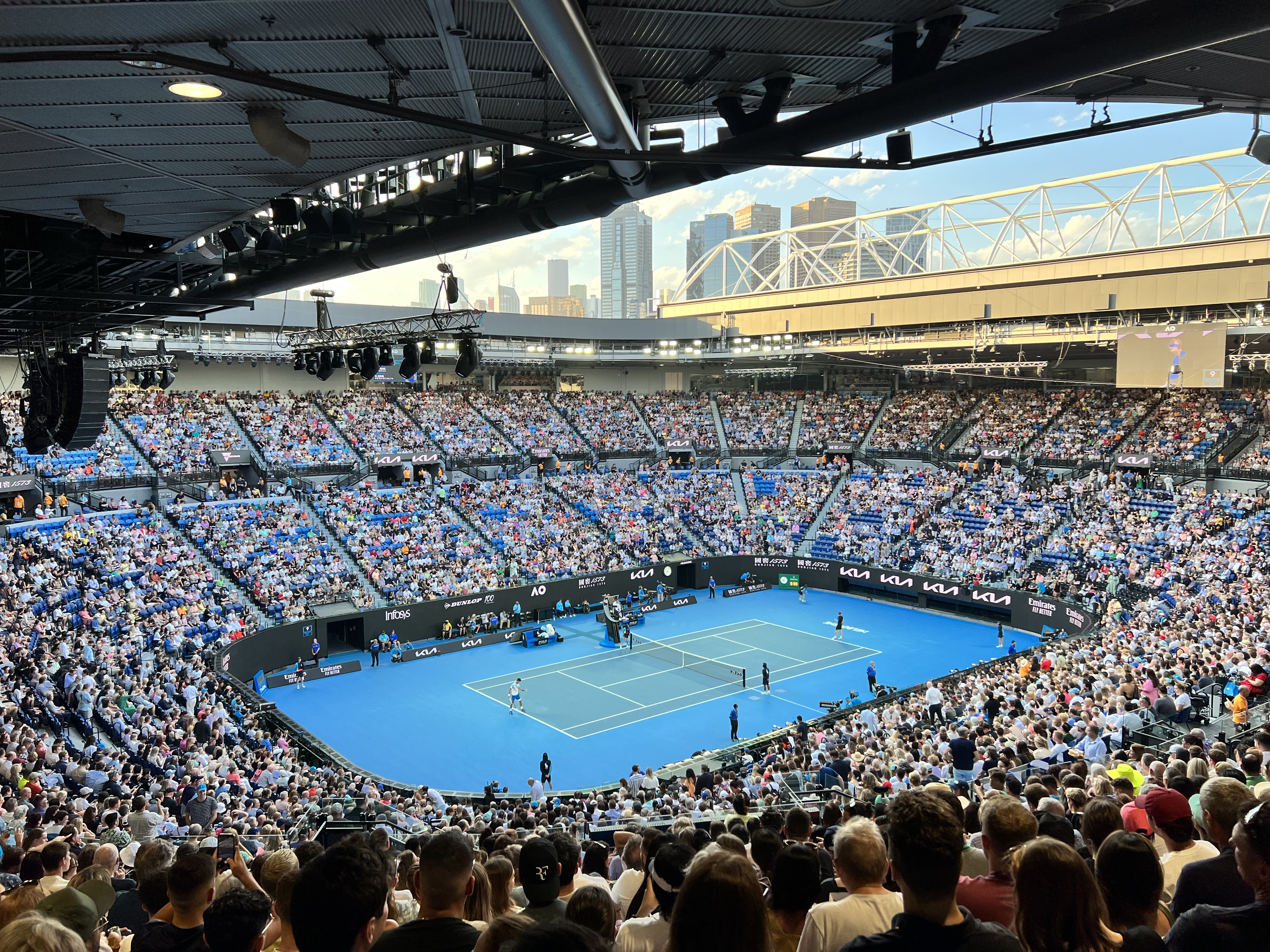
Rod Laver Arena

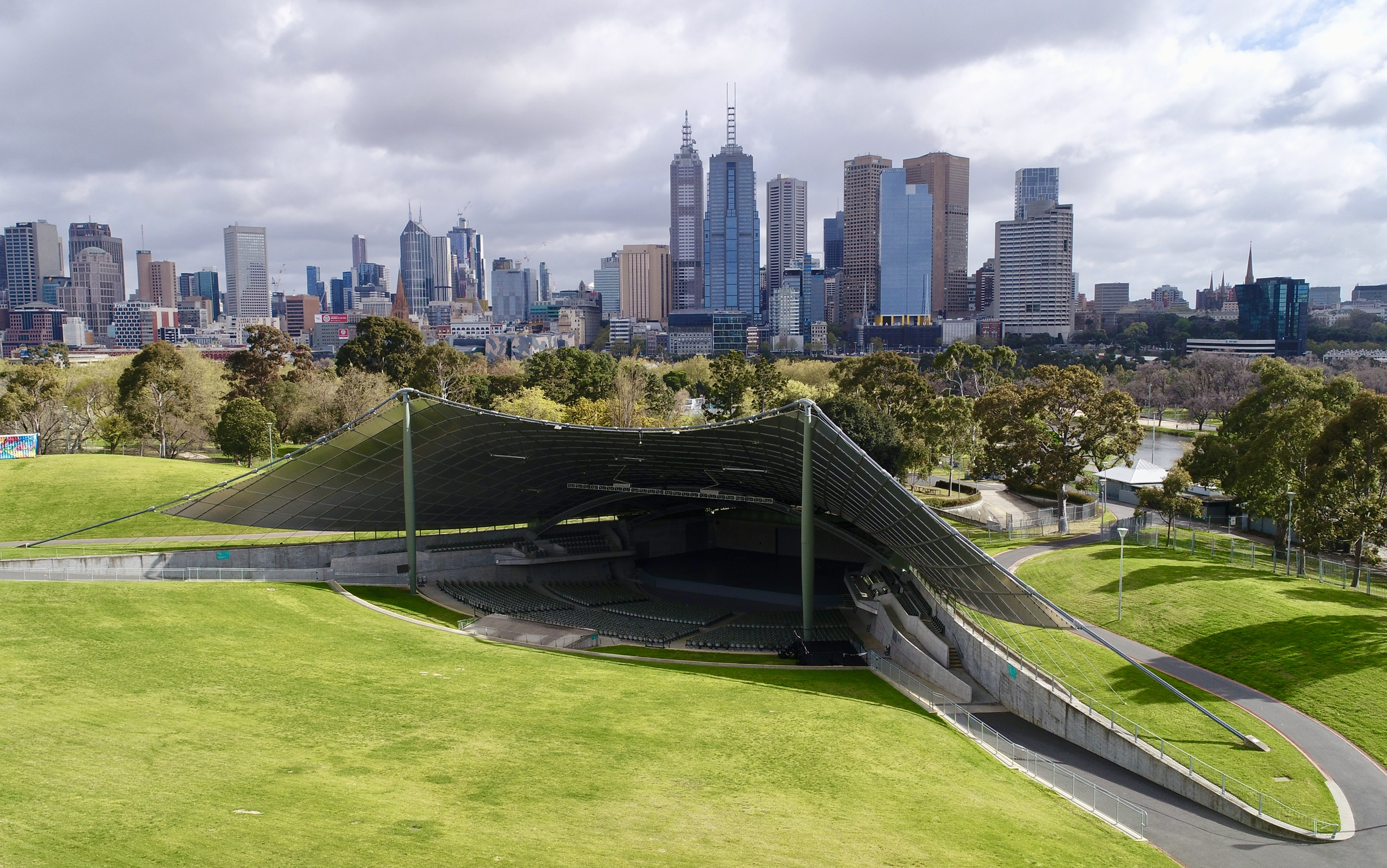
Sidney Myer Music Bowl

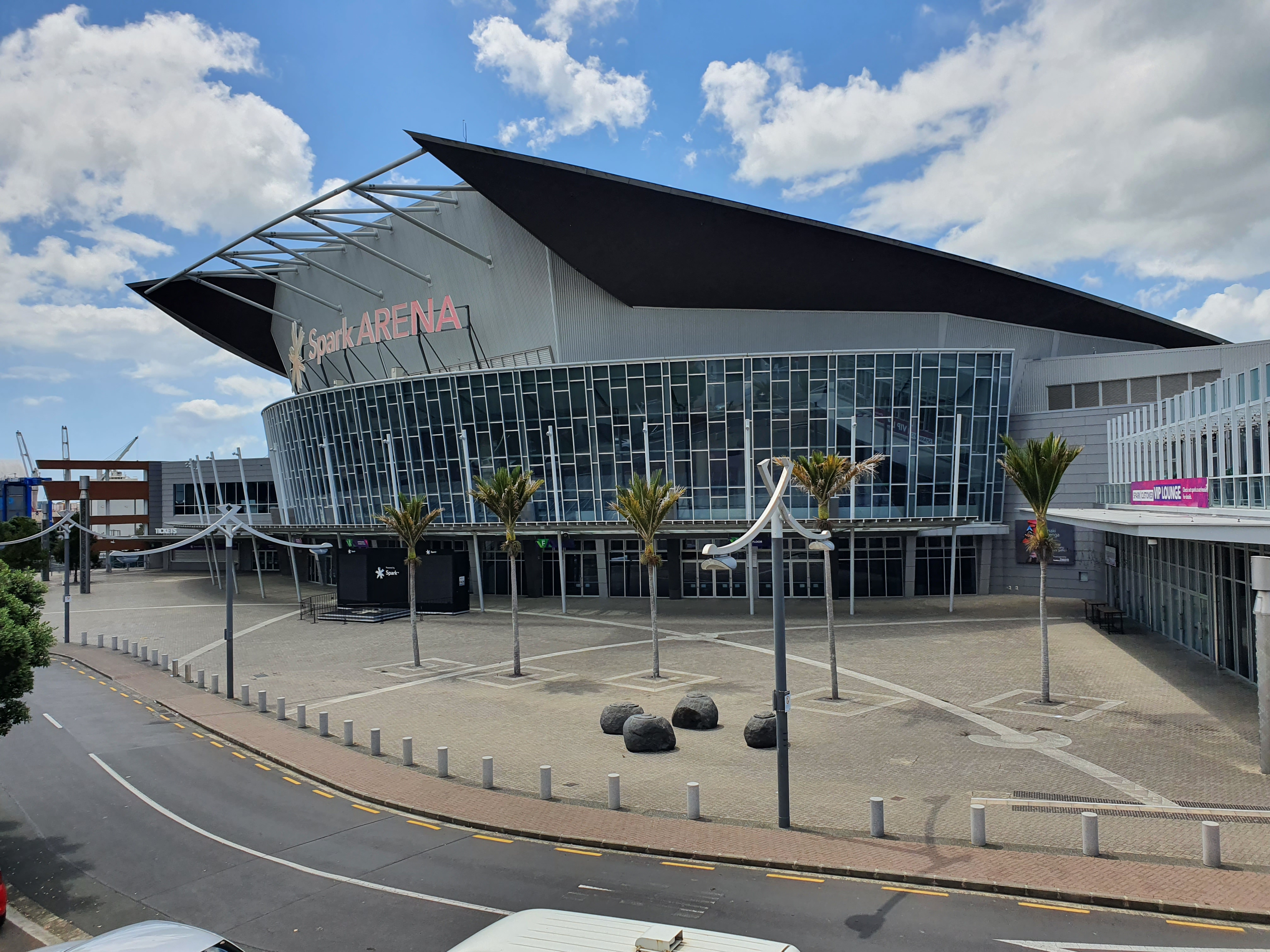
Spark Arena

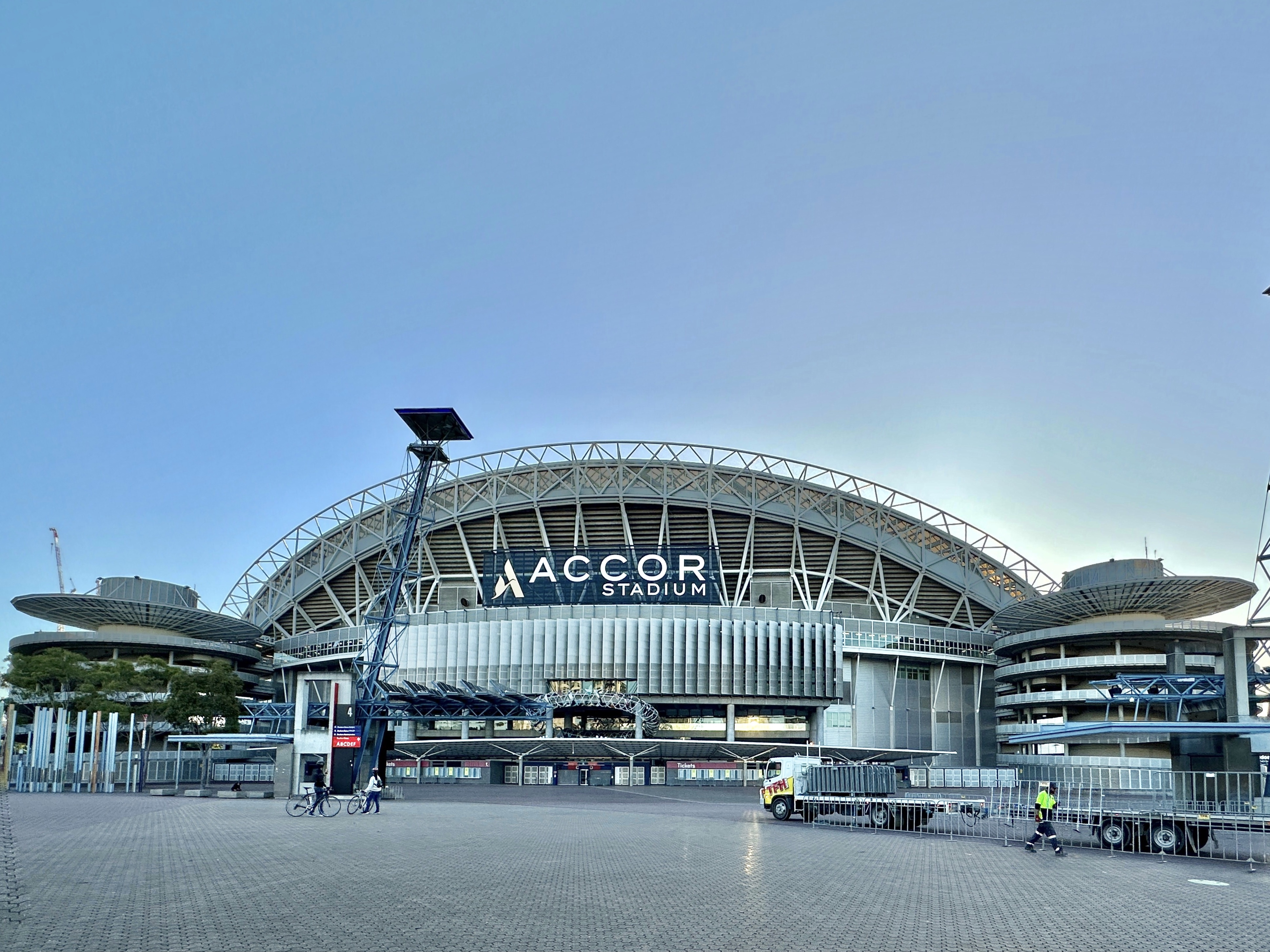
Stadium Australia

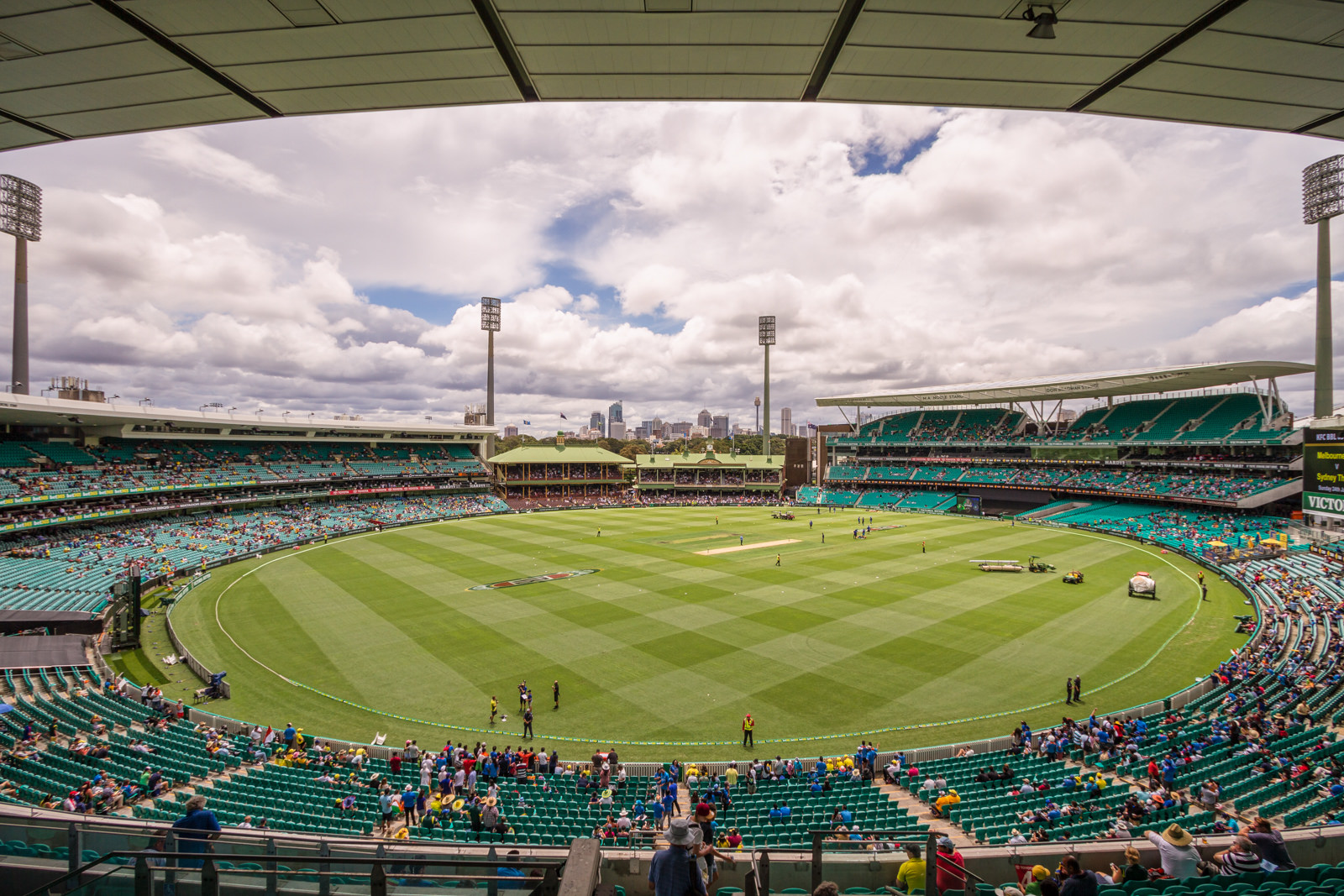
Sydney Cricket Ground

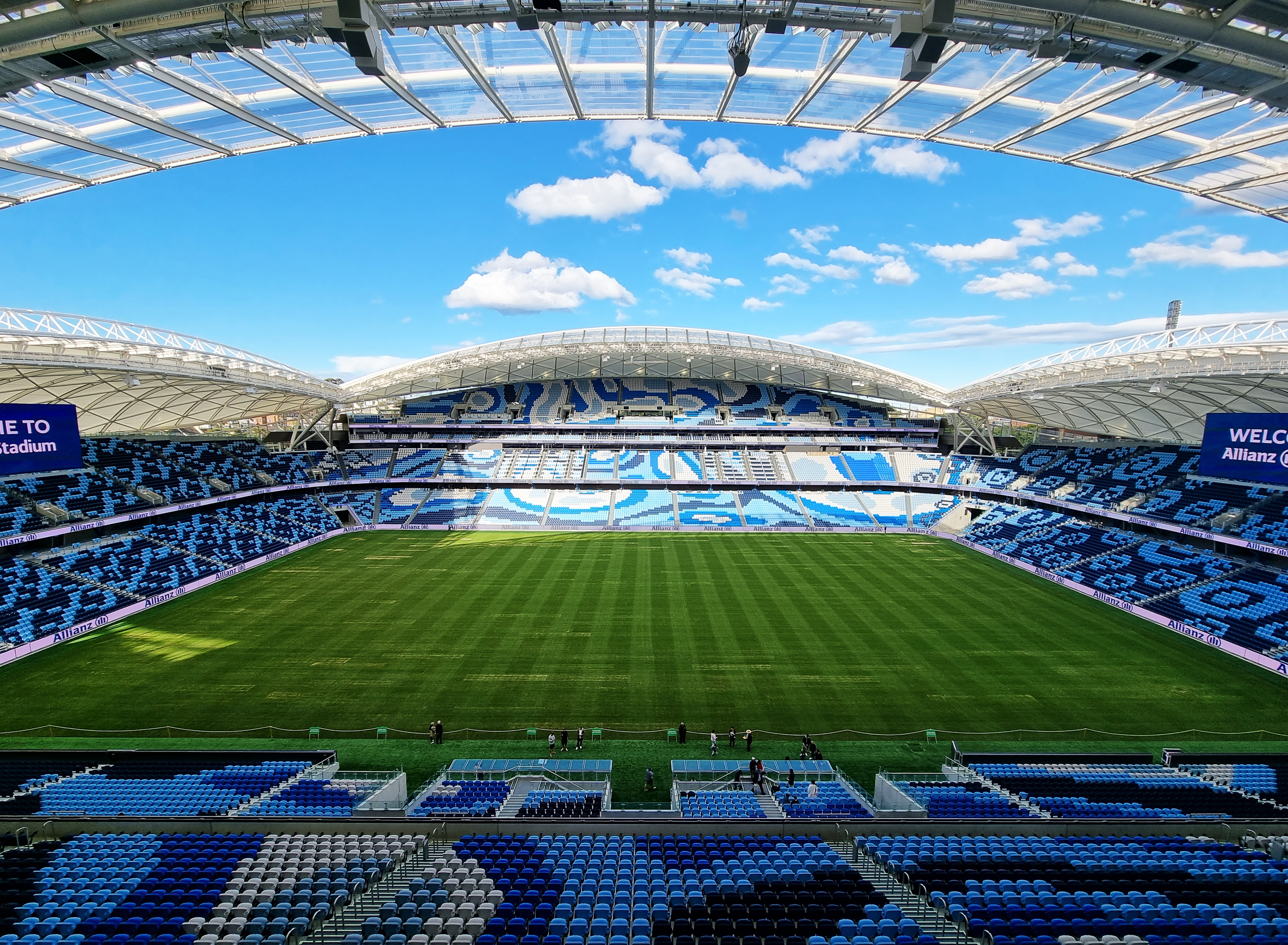
Sydney Football Stadium

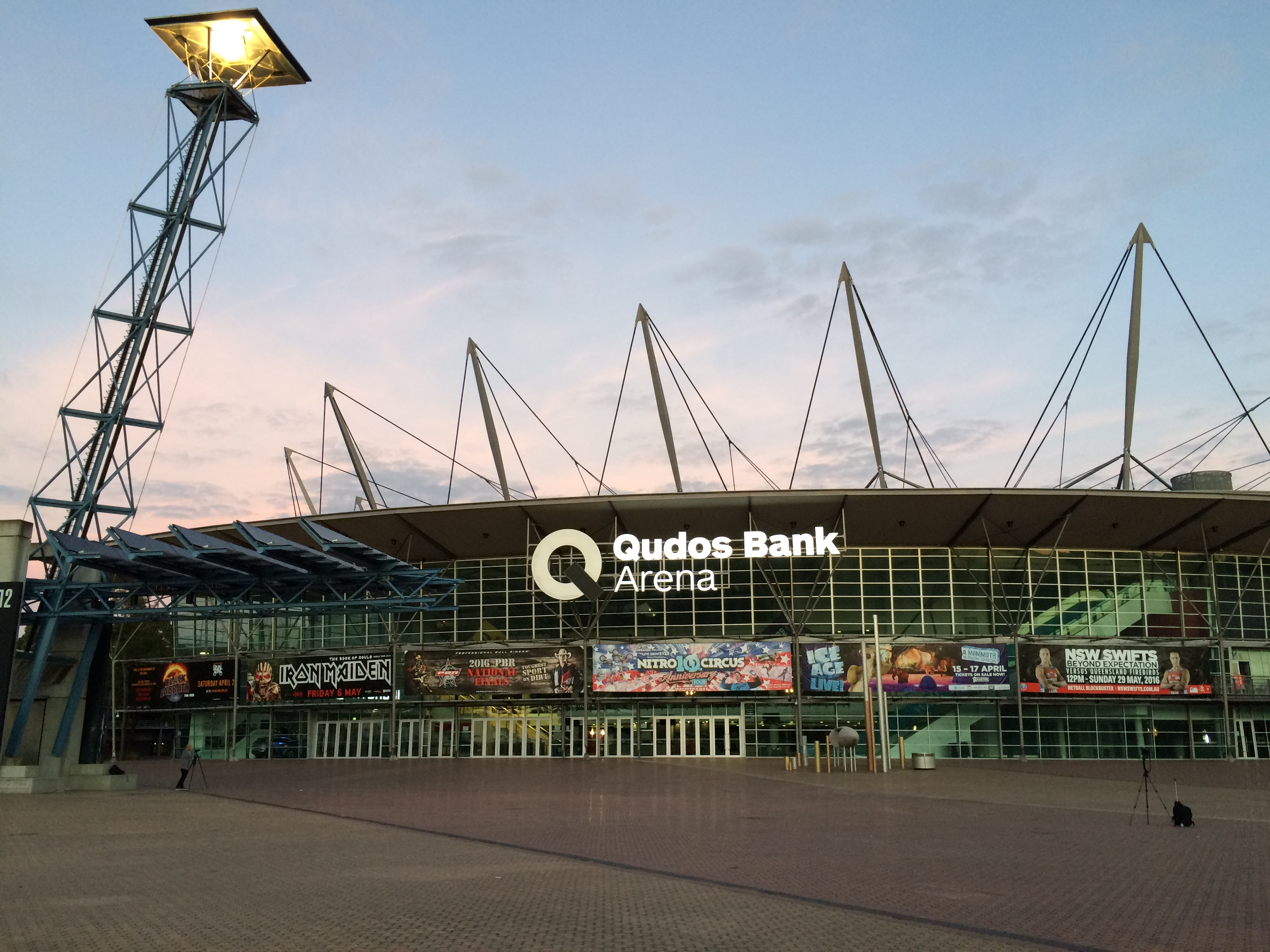
Sydney SuperDome

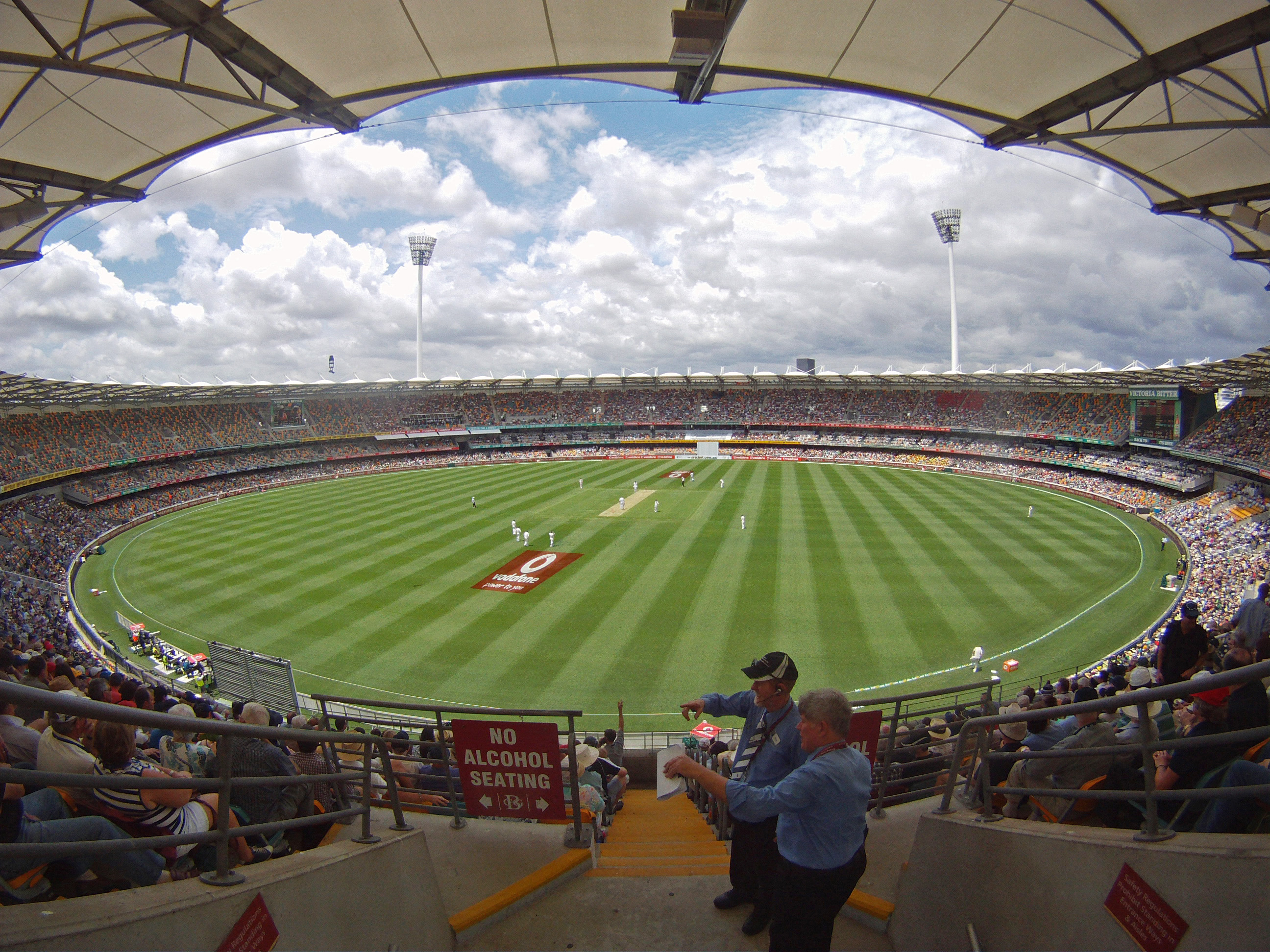
The Gabba

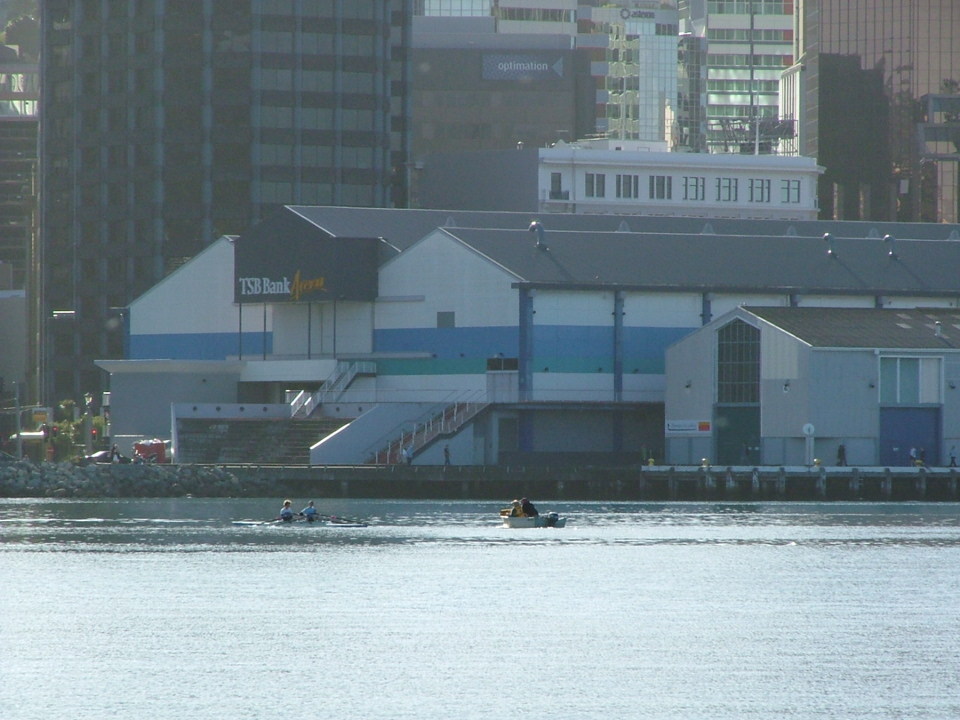
TSB Arena

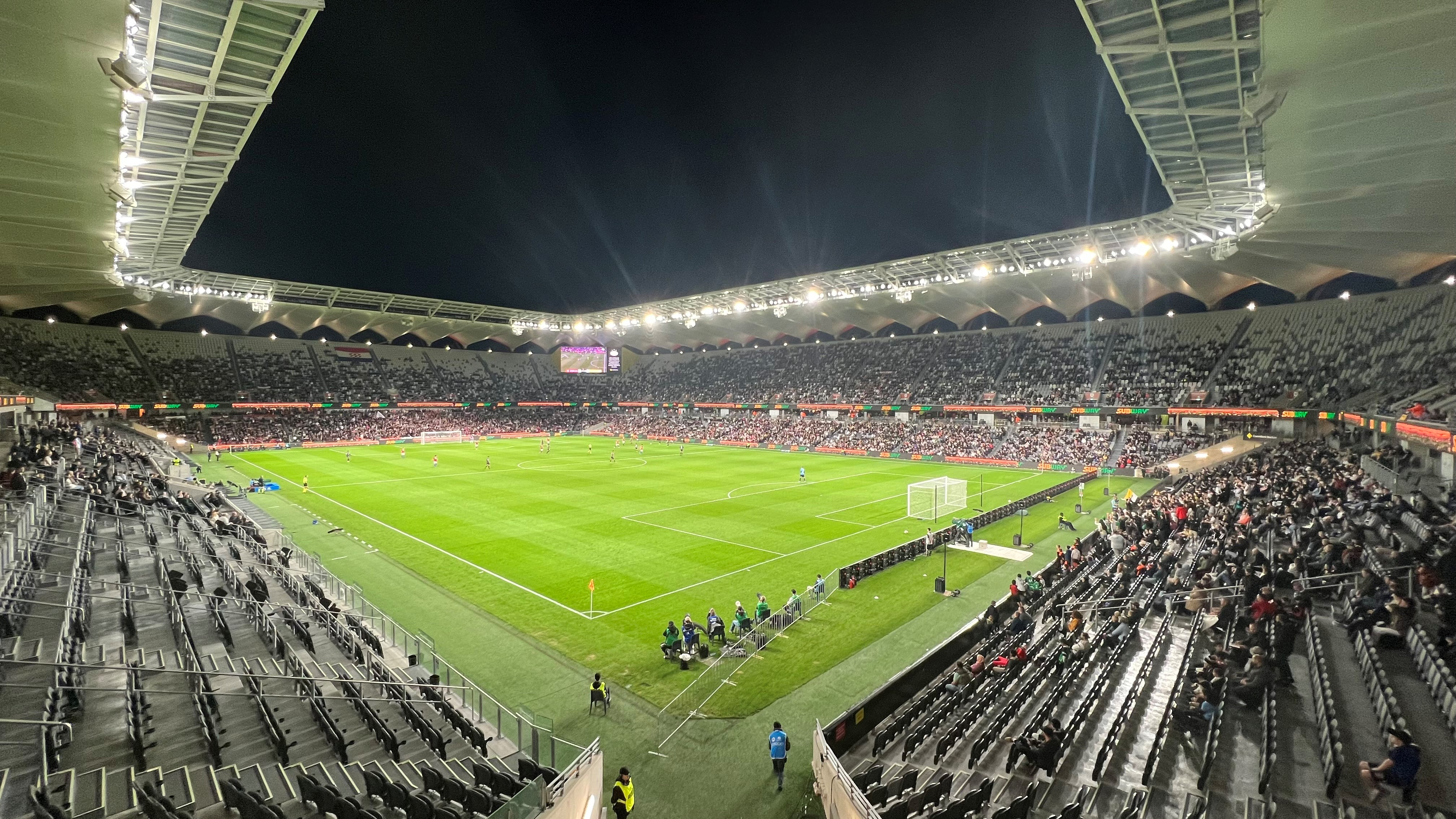
Western Sydney Stadium

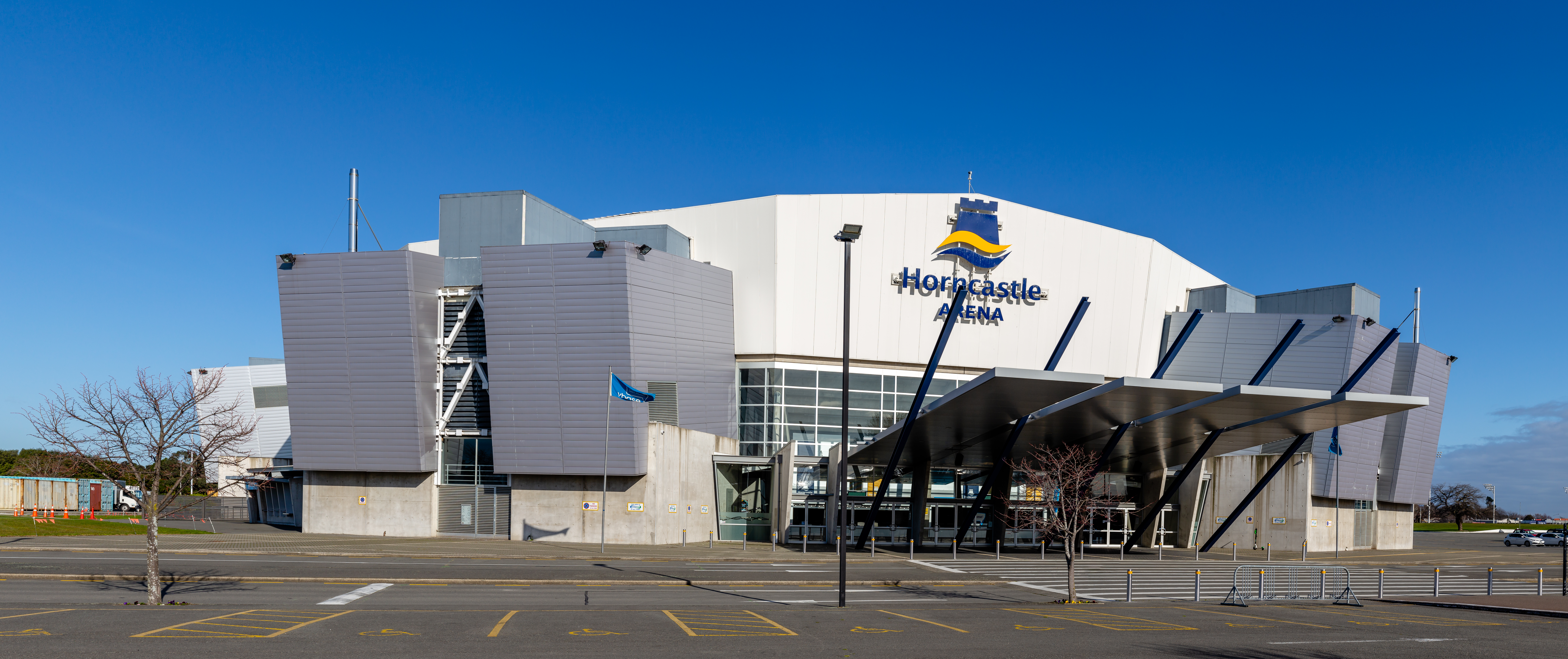
Wolfbrook Arena

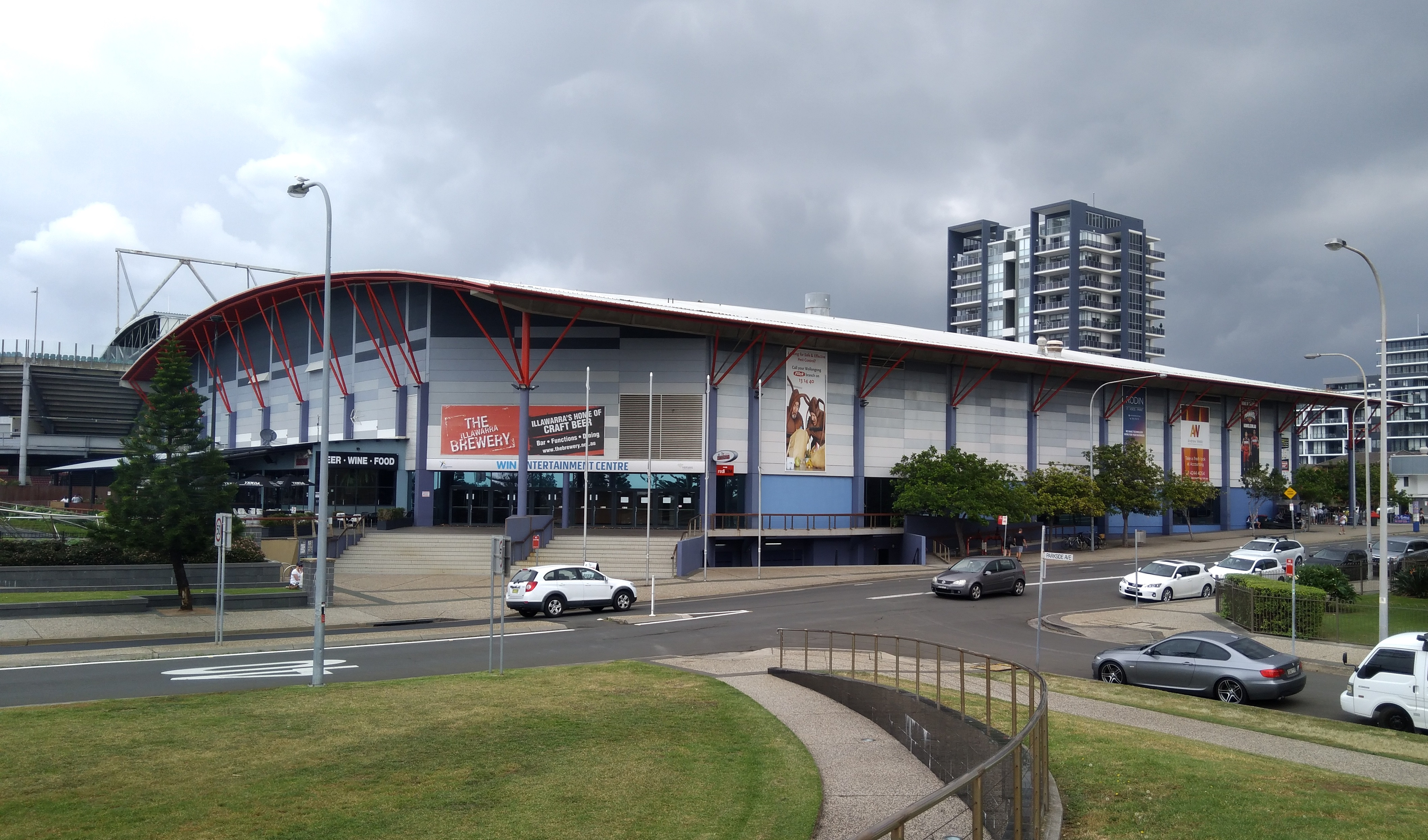
Wollongong Entertainment Centre
