= Australian Boys' Amateur =

The Australian Boys' Amateur is the nations premier junior golf championship for boys. It is run by Golf Australia. It is a 72-hole stroke-play event for players under the age of 18. Until 1993 the age limit was 21.

== Winners ==
Year	Winner	Score	Margin of victory	Runner(s)-up	Venue(s)	Ref.
2024	(Australia) Samuel Cascio	271	4 strokes	(Australia) Kayun Mudadana	Gosnells	
2023	(New Zealand) Zachary Swanwick	274	4 strokes	(Australia) Joseph Buttress	Tasmania	
2022	(Australia) Jeffrey Guan	278	3 strokes	(Australia) Joseph Buttress	The Vines of Reynella	
2021	(Australia) Jeffrey Guan	280	1 stroke	(South Africa) Aldrich Potgieter	Gold Creek	
2020	Cancelled due to the COVID-19 pandemic in Australia				Gold Creek	
2019	(Australia) Elvis Smylie	271	5 strokes	(New Zealand) Kazuma Kobori	Southport	
2018	(Australia) Connor Fewkes	275	2 strokes	(Australia) Jordan Jung	Gosnells	
2017	(Australia) Cameron John	269	1 stroke	(Australia) Jordan Garner	Wollongong	
2016	(New Zealand) Daniel Hillier	278	6 strokes	(Australia) Matias Sanchez	Ulverstone	
2015	(Australia) Ryan Ruffels	273	15 strokes	(Australia) Jason Hong	Kooyonga	
2014	(Australia) Ryan Ruffels	277	3 strokes	(Australia) Blake Windred	The Heritage Golf and Country Club	
2013	(Australia) Anthony Murdaca	272	3 strokes	(Australia) Lucas Herbert	Pinjarra	
2012	(New Zealand) Tyler Hodge	283	1 stroke	(Australia) Viraat Badhwar	Bribie Island	
2011	(Australia) Cameron Smith	279	8 strokes	(Australia) Jake Higginbottom	Carnarvon	
2010	(Australia) Anthony Murdaca	280	2 strokes	(Australia) Jake Higginbottom	Launceston	
2009	(Australia) Do Eun An	284	1 stroke	(Australia) Andrius Belkus (Australia) Anthony Houston	Alice Springs	
2008	(Australia) Daniel Nisbet	281	3 strokes	(Australia) Aiden Bae	Spring Valley	
2007	(Australia) Jason Scrivener	281	2 strokes	(Australia) Danny An	Cottesloe	
2006	(Australia) Boyd Watts	277	5 strokes	(Australia) Kevin Lee	Toowoomba	
2005	(Australia) Eagle Chang	284	Playoff	(Australia) Jason Day	Barwon Heads	
2004	(Australia) Jason Day	282	7 strokes	(New Zealand) Jae An (Singapore) Choo Tze-huang	Yowani	
2003	(Australia) Tom Davis	205 (Note: Event reduced to 54 holes.)	6 strokes	(Australia) David Lutterus	Mowbray	
2002	(Australia) Garrard Weston	293	Playoff	(Australia) Nick Flanagan	Grange (East)	
2001	(Australia) Rick Kulacz	278	1 stroke	(Australia) Steven Bowditch (New Zealand) Eddie Lee	Melville Glades	
2000	(Australia) Mark Wuersching	289	1 stroke	(Australia) Richard Moir	Indooroopilly (East)	
1999	(Australia) Richard Moir	283	5 strokes	(Australia) Anthony Brown	Kew	
1998	(Australia) Adam Scott	287	4 strokes	(Australia) Jonathan O'Sullivan	Orange & Wentworth	
1997	(Australia) Adam Scott	279	1 stroke	(Australia) Aaron Baddeley	Alice Springs	
1996	(Australia) Simon Lacey	287	3 strokes	(Australia) James McLean	Riverside	
1995	(Australia) Nigel Spence	290	10 strokes	(Australia) Dean Beste (Australia) David Gleeson (Australia) Joshua Madden	Grange (East)	
1994	(Australia) David Gleeson	292			Cottesloe	
1993	(Australia) Tom Arnott	299			Royal Queensland	
1992	(New Zealand) Saali Herewini	278	3 strokes	(Australia) Stuart Appleby	Cumberland	
1991	(Australia) Stuart Appleby	292	3 strokes	(Australia) Marty Roberts	Grange (East)	
1990	(Australia) Robert Allenby	288	Playoff	(New Zealand) Grant Moorhead	Keysborough	
1989	(Australia) Marty Roberts	286	1 stroke	(Australia) Stuart Bouvier	Launceston	
1988	(Australia) Peter Zidar	291	Playoff	(Australia) Tony Mills	Capel	
1987	(Australia) Stuart Bouvier	301	Playoff	(Australia) Wayne Stewart	Royal Queensland	
1986	(Australia) Peter O'Malley	280	8 strokes	(Australia) Stephen Taylor	New South Wales	
1985	(Australia) Brett Ogle	281	7 strokes	(Australia) Stephen Taylor	Glenelg	
1984	(Australia) Steve Jackson	305	Playoff	(New Zealand) Paul Cadogan	Victoria	
1983	(New Zealand) Grant Waite	297	Playoff	(Australia) Craig Parry (Australia) Jeff Wagner	Cottesloe	
1982	(New Zealand) Grant Waite	292	3 strokes	(New Zealand) Greg Turner	Royal Queensland	

== See also ==
- Australian Girls' Amateur
- Golf Australia National Squad
- Australian Open
- Australian Amateur
