= Ryan Ruffels =

Australian professional golfer (born 1998)

Personal information
- Nationality: Australia
- Born: 29 April 1998 (age 28) Orlando, Florida, U.S.
- Height: 6 ft 1 in (1.85 m)
- Weight: 178 lb (81 kg; 12.7 st)

Career
- Sport: Golf
- Turned professional: 2016
- Current tour: Korn Ferry Tour
- Former tours: PGA Tour Latinoamérica; PGA Tour Canada

Ryan Ruffels (born 29 April 1998) is an Australian professional golfer.

== Early life and amateur career ==
Ruffels was born in Florida to tennis professionals Ray Ruffels and Anna-Maria Fernandez, but moved at a young age to southern California. His schooling was bilingual, and he is now fluent in both Spanish and English. He was an avid athlete, participating in many sports such as tennis, soccer, and golf.

His two years younger sister Gabriela also became a successful tennis player and, from 2015, golfer. winning the 2019 U.S. Women's Amateur.

Ruffels moved to Australia after his father was offered a major job in Australian tennis. After moving to Australia, Ruffels focused on golf. In 2013, he was on the winning Australian team in the Ten Nations Cup. Later that year he made the cut at the Australian Open and finished in a tie for 24th. In 2014, he became the youngest winner of the Riversdale Cup, winning the event at 15 years of age; he followed a month later with a win in the Australian Boys' Amateur. He also won the 2014 Callaway Junior World Golf Championship. He was ranked 13th in the World Amateur Golf Ranking when he turned professional in January 2016.

== Professional career ==
In January 2016, at the age of 17, Ruffels turned professional, making his debut at the Farmers Insurance Open on the PGA Tour. He received the maximum seven sponsor exemptions on the PGA Tour, but failed to finish higher than 20th in any of his starts. In September, he received an invitation to the Copa Diners Club International on PGA Tour Latinoamérica and finished in a tie for second. He went on to play five more Latinoamérica events and had three more top-ten finishes, causing him to finish 22nd on the Order of Merit. In 2017 he split his time between PGA Tour Latinoamérica and sponsor exemptions to PGA Tour events.

== Amateur wins ==
- 2012 Srixon International Sub-Junior
- 2014 Riversdale Cup, Australian Boys' Amateur, Callaway Junior World Golf Championship
- 2015 Australian Boys' Amateur

== Team appearances ==
Amateur

- Eisenhower Trophy (representing Australia): 2014
- Ten Nations Cup (representing Australia): 2013
- Toyota World Junior (representing Australia): 2013
- Australian Men's Interstate Teams Matches (representing Victoria): 2013, 2014 (winners), 2015 (winners)
