= Desert Springs, Northern Territory =

Desert Springs Alice Springs, Northern Territory
- Coordinates: 23°42′33″S 133°52′52″E
- Population: 1,477 (2016 census)
- Postcode(s): 0870
- LGA(s): Town of Alice Springs
- Territory electorate(s): Araluen
- Federal division(s): Lingiari
Mean max temp	Mean min temp	Annual rainfall
28.9 °C; 84 °F	13.3 °C; 56 °F	282.8 mm 11.1 in

Desert Springs is a suburb of the town of Alice Springs, in the Northern Territory, Australia. It is on the traditional country of the Arrernte people.
