= The Famous Five (1995 TV series) =

1990s British television series

- Genre: Adventure, children's
- Written by: Enid Blyton
- Starring: Jemima Rooper; Paul Child; Marco Williamson; Laura Petela; Elsie Kelly; Christopher Good; Mary Waterhouse
- Theme music composer: Joe Campbell; Paul Hart
- Country of origin: United Kingdom
- Original language: English
- No. of series: 2
- No. of episodes: 26

Production
- Producers: Peter Murphy; John Price
- Camera setup: Multi-camera
- Running time: 25 minutes
- Production companies: Zenith North, Tyne Tees Television, HTV

Original release
- Network: Tyne Tees/HTV (1995); ITV (CITV) (1996)
- Release: 10 September 1995 – 16 February 1997

Related
- The Famous Five (1970s series)

The Famous Five is a British television series based on the children's book series of the same name by Enid Blyton. It was first broadcast on Tyne Tees and Harlech Television (HTV) from 10 September 1995 onwards, and on CITV (the children's strand of ITV) from 1 July 1996 onwards; there were two series between 1995 and 1997, produced by Zenith North and Tyne Tees in 26 twenty-five-minute episodes.

The 1995 series was released in its entirety on VHS video. A three-disc DVD collection, containing 13 of the 26 episodes of the 1995 series, was released in Australia and New Zealand in 2005, and is marked "Revised Edition" to avoid confusion with the previous release of the 1979 series with 1995 artwork. A complete edition of the series was released on DVD in Australia and New Zealand in 2016. Other episodes have reportedly been released on DVD in Europe, but only the adaptation of Five on a Treasure Island was released on DVD in the UK.

The series has been made available on streaming platforms outside the U.K., in some cases only in a dubbed form, such as by German co-producer ZDF, which also has the original English version in its studio library that it has made available in Italy through its streaming channel Pash.

Locations featured in the series included Corfe Castle, Lower House Farm in Bossington in Somerset, Woodchester Mansion, Dunster Castle, Cheddar Caves and Alnwick Castle.

The series was featured in the Enid Blyton Society Journal published by the Enid Blyton Society in an article by its editor in 1996 and written contributions by actresses Jemima Rooper and Laura Petela in 1997.

== Cast ==
- Jemima Rooper as George
- Marco Williamson as Julian
- Paul Child as Dick
- Laura O'Bree (née Laura Petela) as Anne
- Connal as Timmy the Dog
- Elsie Kelly as Joan
- Christopher Good as Uncle Quentin
- Mary Waterhouse as Aunt Frances

== Episodes ==
=== First series ===
The first series was shown on HTV and Tyne Tees.

1. Five on a Treasure Island (part 1) (10 September 1995)
2. Five on a Treasure Island (part 2) (17 September 1995)
3. Five Get into Trouble (24 September 1995)
4. Five Go Adventuring Again (1 October 1995)
5. Five Fall into Adventure (8 October 1995)
6. Five Go to Demon's Rocks (15 October 1995)
7. Five on Kirrin Island Again (22 October 1995)
8. Five on Finniston Farm (29 October 1995)
9. Five Go Off to Camp (5 November 1995)
10. Five Have Plenty of Fun (12 November 1995)
11. Five on a Secret Trail (19 November 1995)
12. Five Go to Smuggler's Top (part 1) (26 November 1995)
13. Five Go to Smuggler's Top (part 2) (3 December 1995)

=== Second series ===
The second series was initially shown on HTV.

1. Five Go Down to the Sea (part 1) (10 November 1996)
2. Five Go Down to the Sea (part 2) (17 November 1996)
3. Five Run Away Together (24 November 1996)
4. Five Have a Mystery to Solve (1 December 1996)
5. Five Go to Mystery Moor (8 December 1996)
6. Five (Go) On a Hike Together (15 December 1996)
7. Five Have a Wonderful Time (part 1) (5 January 1997)
8. Five Have a Wonderful Time (part 2) (12 January 1997)
9. Five Go Off in a Caravan (19 January 1997)
10. Five Get into a Fix (26 January 1997)
11. Five Are Together Again (2 February 1997)
12. Five Go to Billycock Hill (part 1) (9 February 1997)
13. Five Go to Billycock Hill (part 2) (16 February 1997)
