= Whitsun =

Name for Christian holy day of Pentecost

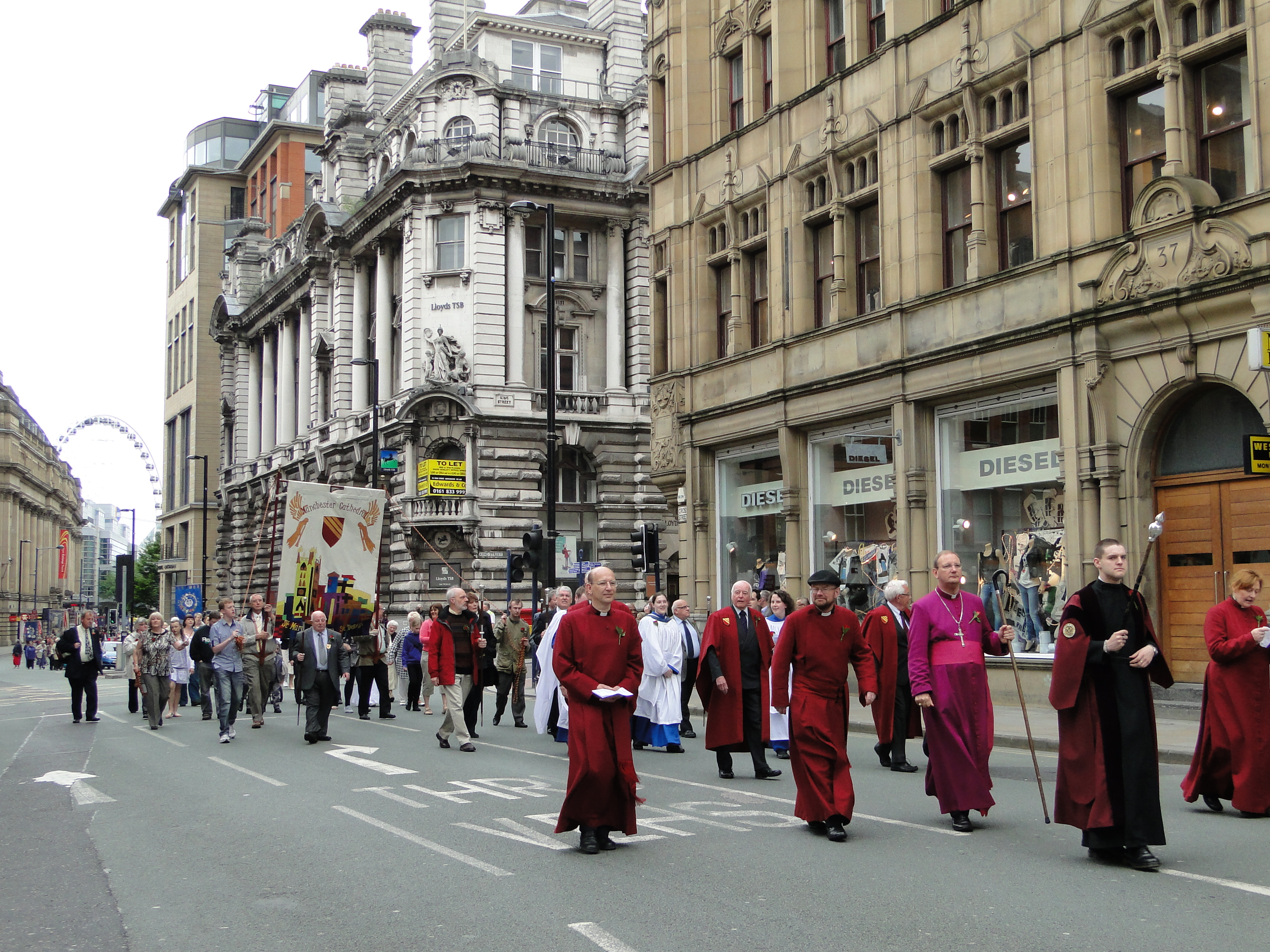
- Manchester 2010 Whit Walks
- Also called: Pentecost (Western), Trinity Sunday (Eastern)
- Observed by: United Kingdom and some former colonies
- Type: Christian, Public
- Begins: 7th Sunday After Easter
- Date: Easter + 49 days (7 weeks)
- 2025 date: June 8
- 2026 date: May 24
- 2027 date: May 16
- 2028 date: June 4
- Frequency: annual
- Related to: Pentecost, Whit Monday, Whit Tuesday, Whit Friday, Trinity Sunday

Whitsun (also Whitsunday or Whit Sunday) is the name used in Britain and among Anglicans and Methodists in other countries, for the Christian holy day of Pentecost. It falls on the seventh Sunday after Easter and commemorates the descent of the Holy Spirit upon Jesus' disciples (as described in Acts 2). Whitsuntide, the week following Whitsunday, was one of three holiday weeks for the medieval villein; on most manors he was free from service on the lord's demesne this week, which marked a pause in the agricultural year. Whit Monday, the day after Whitsun, remained a holiday in Britain until 1972, when it was replaced by a Spring Bank Holiday on the last Monday in May.

Whitsun had been the occasion for many forms of celebration, and was of significant cultural importance. It was a custom for children to receive a new set of clothes, even among the poorest families, a tradition which continued well into the 20th century. In the North West of England, church and chapel parades called Whit walks still take place at this time (sometimes on Whit Friday, the Friday after Whitsun). Typically, the parades include brass bands and choirs; girls attending are dressed in white. Traditionally, Whit fairs (sometimes called Whitsun ales) took place. Other customs, such as morris dancing, were associated with Whitsun, although in most cases they have been transferred to the Spring bank holiday. Whaddon, Cambridgeshire, has its own Whitsun tradition of singing a unique song around the village before and on Whit Sunday itself.

== Etymology ==
The name Whitsun is a contraction of White Sunday, which is attested from the Old English period (as Hwit Sunnandæg). It apparently has reference to the white robes historically worn by newly baptised Christians, Whitsun having been a favourite time for baptisms in the early medieval church. The first element was however confused by some with wit, a confusion evident in the writings of the Augustinian canon John Mirk (c. 1382–1414):

Goode men and woymen, as ȝe knowen wele all, þys day ys called Whitsonday, for bycause þat þe Holy Gost as þys day broȝt wyt and wysdome ynto all Cristes dyscyples. ["Good men and women, as you all well know, this day is called Whitsunday because the Holy Ghost on this day brought wit and wisdom to all Christ's disciples."]

== History ==
As the first holiday of the summer, Whitsun was one of the favourite times in the traditional calendar, and Whit Sunday, or the following week, was a time for celebration. This took the form of fêtes, fairs, pageants and parades, with Whitsun ales and Morris dancing in the south of England and Whit walks, Club Days and wakes in the north. A poster advertising the Whitsun festivities at Sunbury, Middlesex in 1778 listed the following attractions:

On Whit Monday, in the morning, will be a punting match ... The first boat that comes in to receive a guinea ... In the afternoon a gold-laced hat, worth 30s. to be cudgell'd for ... On Whit Tuesday, in the morning, a fine Holland smock and ribbons, to be run for by girls and young women. And in the afternoon six pairs of buckskin gloves to be wrestled for.

In Manchester during the 17th century, the nearby Kersal Moor Whit races were the great event of the year. Large numbers of people turned the area into a giant fairground for several days. With the coming of industrialisation, it became convenient to close down whole towns for a week in order to clean and maintain the machinery in the mills and factories. The week of closure, or wakes week, was often held at Whitsuntide. A report in John Harlan and T.T. Wilkinson's Lancashire Folk lore (1882) reads:

It is customary for the cotton mills etc., to close for Whitsuntide week to give the hands a holiday; the men going to the races etc. and the women visiting Manchester on Whit-Saturday, thronging the markets, the Royal Exchange and the Infirmary Esplanade, and other public places: And gazing in at the shop windows, whence this day is usually called 'Gaping Sunday'.

Whit Monday was officially recognised as a bank holiday in the UK in 1871 and observed for 100 years, but lost this status in 1972 when the fixed Spring Bank Holiday was created.

== In literature ==
- 1485: Malory's Le Morte D'Arthur has the Knights of the Round Table witness a divine vision of the Holy Grail on a Whitsunday, prompting their quest to find its true location.
- 1607: Thomas Middleton refers to "the Whitsun holy-days" in Michaelmas Term (IV.i.73).
- 1611: In Shakespeare's The Winter's Tale, Perdita imagines that she plays "as I have seen them do / In Whitsun pastorals" (IV.iv.133-34).
- 1617: James I's Declaration of Sports encouraged "Whitsun ales", among other things, as soon as church was over on a Sunday.
- 1633: George Herbert wrote a poem called "Whitsunday", first published in The Temple: Sacred Poems and Private Ejaculations.
- 1759-67: Laurence Sterne's novel The Life and Opinions of Tristram Shandy, Gentleman contains several allusions to Whitsuntide.
- 1785: Samuel Johnson records in his Prayers and Meditations that "Between Easter and Whitsun-tide [1773 . . . he] attempted to learn the Low Dutch language." James Boswell reproduces the remark in his Life of Samuel Johnson (1791).
- 1787: The Whitsun Donative was an anonymous satirical pamphlet inspired by Sterne's Tristram Shandy.
- 1844: Whitsun is central to religious life in Swiss author Jeremias Gotthelf's novel Money and Spirit.
- 1849: Charlotte Brontë's novel Shirley contains an episode set against a Whitsun-tide procession in which Anglican parishioners are confronted by dissenters.
- 1853: Charles Dickens sets a scene in the life of King Edward I on "one Friday in Whitsun week" in A Child's History of England.
- 1853: Christina Rossetti wrote a poem called "Whitsun Eve", published posthumously in 1896.
- 1861: George Eliot mentioned Whitsun in her novel Silas Marner.
- 1875: Charles Dickens's posthumous collection The Uncommercial Traveller includes (in Chapter 21) a reflection on "one day in the Whitsun week last past".
- 1875: In Anthony Trollope's book The Way We Live Now many of the aristocrats leave London and travel to their country estates, or those of their acquaintances, for the week of Whitsuntide.
- 1896: H. G. Wells refers to Whitsun in "The Story of the Late Mr. Elvesham", later included in The Country of the Blind and Other Stories.
- 1897: In H. G. Wells's The Invisible Man, important events take place around Whit Monday and subsequent days.
- 1911: The short story "The Wrong Shape" in G. K. Chesterton's The Innocence of Father Brown takes place in Whitsuntide.
- 1916: James Joyce's novel A Portrait of the Artist as a Young Man contains reference (in Chapter 2) to a Whitsuntide play at Stephen Dedalus's school, Belvedere College.
- 1922: James Joyce's novel Ulysses contains four references to Whit Monday. Leopold Bloom is stung by a bee on Whitmonday, 23 May 1904.
- 1932: Agatha Christie's short story "Ingots of Gold" references Whitsuntide and Whit Monday as clues in solving the crime.
- 1936: In Gladys Mitchell's Mrs Bradley detective novel Dead Men's Morris (Michael Joseph, 1936, reprinted 1986) the story of the murders of an Oxfordshire solicitor and his rival, a landowner, begins on Christmas Eve, and reaches its climax with a Morris dance performance on Whit-Monday.
- 1938: In Graham Greene's Brighton Rock, Hale is murdered on Whitsun, kicking off events in the novel.
- 1943: Kathleen Raine's poem "Whitsuntide 1942" provides the title for her first poetry collection, Stone and Flower, by referencing 'the world / of stone and flower that compels my thought... what nerve have I, beloved Lord, what sense / to know the holy presence of my God?'
- 1950: The autobiographical novel A Voice Through a Cloud by Denton Welch concerns the author's near-fatal bike accident and its aftermath, which occurred on a Whitsun holiday.
- 1957: Enid Blyton's Five Go to Billycock Hill is a novel in the Famous Five series of children's books set during a camping holiday at Whitsun.
- 1961: Sylvia Plath wrote a poem called "Whitsun", published posthumously in 1971.
- 1964: The Whitsun Weddings is a poem and the title of a collection by Philip Larkin.
- 1965: "Whitsunday in Kirchstetten" is a poem by W. H. Auden, from his collection About the House.
- 1973: Thomas Pynchon refers to Whitsun in his novel Gravity's Rainbow (section 2, 20).
- 2010: In Washington: A Life, a 2010 biography by Ron Chernow, George Washington is said to have included a drinking allowance in an employment contract with one of his gardeners, allowing "two dollars at Whitsuntide to be drunk four days and four nights" (p. 135).
- 2011: Several episodes in author Jeff Wheeler's Muirwood Trilogy revolve around Whitsunday and its significance and impact on Muirwood's inhabitants.
- 2022: Whitsun is mentioned in Gillian McAllister's Wrong Place Wrong Time.

== In film ==
- 1942: The Second World War film Went the Day Well? depicts the fictional takeover of an English village by German soldiers over Whitsun weekend.
- 1995: P.R.O.B.E: The Devil of Winterborne takes place over the Whitsun holiday.

== See also ==
- Whitsun Ale (esp., English), a county fair with competitions, Morris dancing, and music, usually sponsored by a local pub or tavern.
- Semik
- Rusalii
- Counting of the Omer
