= Five Are Together Again =

1963 children's novel by Enid Blyton

- First edition
- Author: Enid Blyton
- Illustrator: Eileen A. Soper
- Language: English
- Series: The Famous Five series
- Genre: Mystery, Adventure novel
- Publisher: Hodder & Stoughton
- Publication date: 1963
- Publication place: United Kingdom
- Media type: Print (hardcover and paperback)
- Preceded by: Five Have a Mystery to Solve

Five Are Together Again (published 1963) is a children's novel in The Famous Five series by Enid Blyton. It was first published by Hodder and Stoughton and in its first edition illustrated by Eileen Soper.

This is the 21st and last complete novel to feature the Famous Five and was published 21 years after their first adventure Five on a Treasure Island.

== Plot introduction ==
The children are supposed to be staying at Kirrin Cottage, but as soon as George's parents' maid Joanna catches scarlet fever, the Five are sent to live with an old friend, called Tinker, and his famous scientist father, who first appeared in Five Go to Demon's Rocks (1961). When top secret papers belonging to the scientist go missing, it is left up to the children to find the thief. There are some circus folk camping in Tinker's field. Five then head to the castle in the moor near Tinker's field.

The Five suspect Mr.Wooh, a genius working in the circus, because Mr.Wooh was famous for being very fast at arithmetic calculations. Therefore, they planned to hide the rest of the papers at Kirrin Island. Initially, Julian and Dick decided to go to the island. However, George goes there without anyone's notice and traps Mr.Wooh and another accomplice there, deserted on the island. The Five then log a case against them. The next day, Tinker finds eventually that Charlie the Chimp is the thief trained by Mr.Wooh.
