= Five Have a Wonderful Time =

1952 children's novel by Enid Blyton

Five Have A Wonderful Time
- First edition
- Author: Enid Blyton
- Cover artist: Eileen A. Soper
- Language: English
- Series: The Famous Five series
- Genre: Mystery, Adventure novel
- Publisher: Hodder & Stoughton
- Publication date: 1952
- Publication place: United Kingdom
- Media type: Print (hardcover and paperback)
- Preceded by: Five on a Hike Together (1951)
- Followed by: Five Go Down to the Sea (1953)

Five Have A Wonderful Time (published in 1952) is a popular children's book written by Enid Blyton. It is the eleventh novel in the Famous Five series of books.

== Plot ==
George has caught a cold due to bathing in the sea in April and, as such, is unable to join Julian, Dick, and Anne on their planned caravan trip. The other children have already set up their caravans on a hill opposite Faynights Castle. George is on the mend from her cold, so she writes a postcard to let Julian, Dick, and Anne know that they should meet her at the railway station the next day. That day, the children learn that two scientists have gone missing. It’s presumed that the scientists are traitors, and have fled the country to sell secrets.

A traveling fair arrives and sets up camp directly next to the Kirrin Children. The children attempt to make friends with the performers, but the performers do not feel the same way. Performers include Alfredo the Fire-Eater, Bufflo the Whip Cracker and his assistant Skippy, Mr. India Rubber, and Mr. Slither, the snake-man. The tension between the children and performers finally culminates in the performers waiting until the children have gone for a walk and then hitching up their own horses to the children’s caravans to move them to another field. The field that the caravans have been moved to is owned by a farmer who orders the children off his property. Unfortunately, the Kirrins are unable to move their caravans without borrowing horses from the performers. Julian and Dick leave to speak to the performers but are unsuccessful in their attempt to borrow the horses. During this time, their old friend Jo (first introduced in Five Fall into Adventure) arrives and joins the Kirrin children. Jo aids Julian and Dick in convincing the fair performers to let them borrow their horses.

While Jo and the children are enjoying a picnic on the hill, Dick spots a face in the window of the castle tower. Julian also confirms that he sees a face, and vows to investigate further. The other children try to see the face in the window but do not see it. The children are convinced that the face in the window must belong to one of the missing scientists, but when they search the grounds the next day during a tour of the castle, they find no evidence. The steps leading up to the tower have crumbled, making it impossible to access the rooms at the top. Julian learns from the ticket lady that two men from the Society for the Preservation of Old Buildings visited the grounds yesterday. He calls the Society to confirm, and the Society tells him that nobody has been there.

The children decided to investigate the castle at nighttime and find that a chunk of the castle wall has been hollowed. The hollowed spot reveals an entrance to a secret passage in the wall that leads up to the tower itself. There the children find one of the missing scientists, Terry-Kane, being held captive. Quickly, they realize that the other scientist, Pottersham, is holding Terry-Kane captive. The children attempt a rescue which fails, and are captured themselves. The fair performers soon realize that the children are missing and attempt a rescue by climbing up the tower to the window where the children first saw the face. Pottersham is overpowered and is finally defeated by the help of Mr. Slither’s snake. Pottersham is taken to the police, where he gives a full confession.

== Adaptations ==
The gamebook The Missing Scientist Game (1988) was based on this novel.
