= Five Run Away Together =

1944 children's novel by Enid Blyton

- Original 1944 first edition cover
- Author: Enid Mary Blyton
- Cover artist: Eileen Alice Soper
- Language: English
- Series: The Famous Five
- Genre: Mystery, Adventure novel
- Publisher: Hodder & Stoughton
- Publication date: 1944
- Publication place: United Kingdom
- Media type: Print (hardcover and paperback)
- Preceded by: Five Go Adventuring Again (1943)
- Followed by: Five Go To Smuggler's Top (1945)

Five Run Away Together (published in 1944) is the third book in the Famous Five series by the British author Enid Blyton.

== Plot ==
Julian, Dick and Anne arrive in Kirrin Cottage to stay with George (real name Georgina) for the holidays. They plan to spend time exploring Kirrin Island but their happiness is spoilt when Aunt Fanny falls ill and has to leave with Uncle Quentin to be treated in a far-off hospital. They are cared for by Aunt Fanny's temporary cook, Mrs. Stick, who is accompanied by her husband and their nasty, tiresome son Edgar. The Sticks and the four children come to hate each other. Mrs Stick repeatedly tries to poison George's dog Timmy, prompting George to hatch a secret plan to run away to Kirrin Island. When Julian catches her leaving, she decides to allow the other children to go with her.

The children find evidence of other people visiting the island and suspect smugglers. The discovery of a young girl's toys and clothes point to something more sinister going on and they then discover the Sticks have imprisoned a young girl, Jennifer Armstrong, on the island and are holding her for ransom. After tormenting the Sticks into a retreat, the children rescue the girl and take her to the police, who are amazed to see the child that "the whole country is looking for." The police accompany them back to the island in time to trap and arrest the Sticks. The kidnapped girl's father then allows her to spend a week with her new friends on Kirrin Island.

== TV adaptation ==
In the 1970s series, Mrs Stick is first seen with her husband who drives her to Kirrin Cottage at the beginning; in the book Mr Stick does not make an appearance until he confronts Julian when the latter steals food from the pantry after Mrs Stick refuses to feed the children properly. Aunt Fanny is not ill, but she does leave the children in order to care for a sick relative. Jennifer Armstrong and her family are never mentioned, although the Sticks kidnap George and Dick before Julian and Anne rescue them.

In the 1990s TV series, Jennifer's father is General Armstrong, who has information on the Gemini project. Jennifer's kidnapping is shown as she is snatched from her bed, then bound and gagged and left in the cave before the Five rescue her. When they leave they bind and gag Edgar, the Sticks' son. In the book, she is kidnapped while playing in the garden. The Sticks are the only ones mentioned to be involved in the crime. Aunt Fanny (re-named Aunt Francis) is not taken sick, but she goes to visit a friend, who needs support having broken her leg.

== Characters ==
- Uncle Quentin
- Aunt Fanny
- Georgina (George)
- Julian
- Dick
- Anne
- Timothy or Tim the dog
- Mr. Stick
- Mrs. Stick
- Edgar Stick
- Mr. Armstrong
- Mrs. Armstrong
- Jennifer Mary Armstrong
- Tinker the dog (Stinker)
- Alf (Fisherman's Son)
