= Five Get into Trouble =

1949 children's novel by Enid Blyton

- First edition
- Author: Enid Blyton
- Illustrator: Eileen A. Soper
- Language: English
- Series: The Famous Five series
- Genre: Mystery, Adventure novel
- Publisher: Hodder & Stoughton
- Publication date: 1949
- Publication place: United Kingdom
- Media type: Print (hardcover and paperback)
- Preceded by: Five Go Off to Camp
- Followed by: Five Fall Into Adventure

Five Get into Trouble is the eighth novel in The Famous Five series by Enid Blyton. It was first published in 1949. In this novel, Dick gets kidnapped, mistaken for another boy whose name is Richard.

== Plot summary ==
Siblings Julian, Dick and Anne are spending the Easter school holidays at Kirrin Cottage with their cousin Georgina (known as George) and her dog, Timmy. After George's parents, Quentin and Fanny, depart for a scientific conferences, the Five embark on a cycling and camping holiday. At a lake, they encounter a boy named Richard Kent, who wants to spend the day cycling with them. He promises to stay at his aunt's house at the end of the day, if his mother gives him permission. The children agree and Richard joins them but doesn't get parental permission. He is later chased by a car driven by one of his wealthy father's former bodyguards called Rooky, who was fired because Richard had told tales about him. Rooky's associates chase Richard on foot in Middlecombe Woods, where they mistake Dick for Richard and kidnap him. Richard finds Julian and George, who berate him for his lying and cowardice.

Julian, Anne, George and Richard trace Dick to a house called Owl's Dene and on the way Julian observes a man changing clothes and another man throwing clothes down a well. The children sneak into Owl's Dene but are caught and imprisoned, while Timmy remains outside. That night, Julian finds Dick locked in an upstairs room and discovers a secret room with a man sleeping in it. The next morning, Rooky arrives and sees his associates have kidnapped the wrong boy. The Five and Richard are nearly freed, but Richard is recognised and they are imprisoned in the grounds of the house.

When one of the gang members leaves in their car, Richard hides in the boot, narrowly escaping being recaptured and then goes to the police. When the police arrive at Owl's Dene, Julian shows them the secret room containing an escaped convict and stolen diamonds. The Five later join Richard for a meal and praise his heroism.

== Adaptations ==
The novel was adapted in 1970 as a Danish-German film production, De 5 i fedtefadet and in 2013 as a German film, Famous Five 2.

It was also adapted in English, as a 1978 double episode of the 70s TV show and a 1995 episode of the 90s TV show.
