= Five on Kirrin Island Again =

1947 children's novel by Enid Blyton

Five On Kirrin Island Again
- Original 1947 first edition cover
- Author: Enid Blyton
- Cover artist: Eileen A. Soper
- Language: English
- Series: The Famous Five series
- Genre: Mystery, Adventure novel
- Publisher: Hodder & Stoughton
- Publication date: October 1947
- Publication place: United Kingdom
- Media type: Print (hardcover and paperback)
- Preceded by: Five Go Off in a Caravan
- Followed by: Five Go Off to Camp

Five On Kirrin Island Again is the sixth novel in the Famous Five series by Enid Blyton. It was first published in October 1947.

== Plot ==
Julian, Dick, Anne and George plan to visit Kirrin Island for their school holidays, but George's father, Uncle Quentin, is using the island to conduct secretive scientific experiments.

George is frustrated by this, but reluctantly agrees to lend her island to her father until he completes his work. She is even more concerned that he wants to keep Timmy on the island with him, but agrees after he says he will flash them from a light tower every night, that he has built as part of his research. Uncle Quentin is later kidnapped by villains wanting his secret formula for alternative energy and he is imprisoned in a tunnel on the island. After he fails to make his usual daily signal, the Five set out to rescue him.

The children also befriend an artistic boy named Martin, whose guardian, Mr Curton, has rented out a cottage on the mainland. Timmy plays an essential part in the eventual rescue of Uncle Quentin from the kidnappers, the leader of which turns out to be Mr Curton himself. At the conclusion, Martin is freed from his guardian and gains admission to an Art School.

== Adaptation ==
The book inspired a 2012 German film, Fünf Freunde.
