= Five on a Treasure Island (film) =

1957 British film serial by Michael Kerrigan

- Opening title
- Directed by: Michael Kerrigan
- Written by: Michael Barnes; Frank Wells (adaptation)
- Based on: the novel Five on a Treasure Island by Enid Blyton
- Produced by: Frank Wells
- Cinematography: Norman Jones
- Music by: Jack Beaver
- Release date: August 1957
- Running time: 8 × 15min episodes
- Country: United Kingdom

Five on a Treasure Island is an eight-part 1957 British TV and film serial directed by Michael Kerrigan and starring Rel Grainer, Richard Palmer, Gillian Harrison and John Bailey. It was written by Michael Barnes and Frank Wells based on the 1942 novel of the same name by Enid Blyton. The author herself helped cast the film.

== Plot ==
George, Julian, Anne, Dick and their dog find lost treasure in a wrecked ship. However, so do some crooks.

== Cast ==
- Rel Grainer as George
- Richard Palmer as Julian
- John Bailey as Dick
- Gillian Harrison as Anne
- Daga as Tim the Dog
- Robert Cawdron as Luke Undown
- Nicholas Bruce as Jim
- Peter Burton as Quentin Kirrin
- Iris Russell as Margaret Kirrin
- Robert Dean as Cmdr. Mainbridge
- John Charlesworth as Jan
- Rufus Cruickshank as Captain Zachary (as Rufus Cruikshank)

== Episodes ==
Episodes sourced from the British Board of Film Classification.

1. "The Famous Five"
2. "Diving To Danger "
3. "The Secret Of The Wreck"
4. "On The Track Of The Treasure"
5. "Trapped In The Dungeons"
6. "Escape To Danger"
7. "At The Mercy Of The Waves"
8. "The Five Triumphant"

== Production ==
It was filmed in Dorset, UK, at Corfe Castle, in Corfe Castle Village, the Jurassic Coast, Lulworth Cove and Stair Hole near Lulworth Cove which served as the Kirrin Island landing spot for the rowing boat in the film.

== Critical reception ==
Kine Weekly wrote: "The story moves forward at a brisk pace, the suspense angles at the end of each instalment are well contrived, the photography is worthy of the attractive coastal settings, but the background music is often too strident. An excellent children's serial backed by the name of Enid Blyton, from whose story the picture was adapted. First-class fare for the young. ... The picture is framed in settings that will appeal to all youngsters, including a ruined castle, rocks, a sunken ship, and lost treasure. Rel Grainer, as the tomboy, is all one's fancy paints, while Richard Palmer, Gillian Harrison and John Bailey are equally effective as her cousins. The adult cast, headed by Robert Cawdron and Nicholas Bruce as a pair of not too fearsome villains, and Peter Burton and Iris Russell as George's parents, achieve the not too easy task of holding their own against juvenile competition, while the direction of Gerald Landau is highly efficient."

The Daily Film Renter wrote: "Performances are convincing and the film as a whole is tailored to suit the tastes of youngsters up to the very early teens, for whom it supplies entertainment just as they like it."

DVD Beaver wrote "Chock-full of cliff-hangers and mystery, the popular Children's Film Foundation serial remains close to the spirit of the book...This is very highly recommended."
