= Five Have a Mystery to Solve =

1962 children's novel by Enid Blyton

Five Have A Mystery To Solve
- First edition
- Author: Enid Blyton
- Illustrator: Eileen A. Soper
- Language: English
- Series: The Famous Five series Characters: Julian, Dick, Anne, George And Wilfrid
- Genre: Mystery, Adventure novel
- Publisher: Hodder & Stoughton
- Publication date: 1962
- Publication place: United Kingdom
- Media type: Print (hardcover and paperback)
- Preceded by: Five Go to Demon's Rocks
- Followed by: Five Are Together Again
- Text: Five Have A Mystery To Solve online

Five Have a Mystery to Solve is the 20th novel in the Famous Five series by Enid Blyton. It was first published in 1962. As the penultimate novel in the Famous Five series, it follows the usual formula of finding secret passages, drinking ginger beer, hunting treasure, and foiling evil-doers.

== Plot ==
The Five are invited to stay at a holiday cottage near the coast. There they meet and make friends with Wilfred, a boy with an almost magical knack of attracting animals. Offshore is Whispering Island where, according to Lucas, a former guardian of the island who now works at a golf-course on the coast, strange goings-on have been reported.

The Five and Wilfred hire a boat and row across to the island where, despite the Five's resolve to avoid adventures, they find themselves stranded. Wilfrid has discovered that someone is stealing the island's old treasures.

The Five climb into the ground of a supposedly empty stone house and find themselves locked in a strange cellar along with Wilfred and the stolen treasure. Before the thieves come back, they manage to escape through a ventilation hole. Unable to locate the hired boat, which the thieves attempt to take for their own use, the Five decide they will have to risk sleeping on the island. Fortunately, Anne and Timmy the dog manage to get the thieves away from the boat, and Anne persuades the others to row back to the mainland.

Everyone spends a day with the police, recounting what has happened. The story closes with the Five lying sunbathing on a hillside near the holiday cottage, with all the local animals and birds gathering round to listen to Wilfred playing his flute.

== Real locations and characters ==
Whispering Island is thought to be based on Brownsea Island in Poole Harbour.

Lucas is thought to be based on the grounds man of the Isle of Purbeck golf-course, which Blyton's husband owned.

== Film adaptation ==
A 6-part Children's Film Foundation film serial was produced in 1964, directed by Ernest Morris. The film starred David Palmer (Julian), Amanda Coxell (George), Darryl Read (Dick), Paula Boyd (Anne), and Michael Wennink (Wilfrid). Filmed mainly on location in Cornwall, United Kingdom, and at Bushey Studios, Hertfordshire, United Kingdom. On one occasion, Blyton visited the set during the filming and spent the day with all the cast and crew.
