= Five Go Off to Camp =

1948 children's novel by Enid Blyton

Five Go Off To Camp
- Original 1948 first edition cover
- Author: Enid Blyton
- Illustrator: Eileen Soper
- Language: English
- Series: The Famous Five series
- Genre: Mystery, Adventure novel
- Publisher: Hodder & Stoughton
- Publication date: 1948
- Publication place: United Kingdom
- Media type: Print (hardcover and paperback)
- Pages: 250
- Preceded by: Five On Kirrin Island Again
- Followed by: Five Get Into Trouble

Five Go Off to Camp is the seventh novel in the Famous Five children's adventure series by Enid Blyton. Originally serialised in Sunny Stories magazine from March to November 1948, it was first published that October, and was followed by a number of reprints and translations. The story revolves around mysterious "spook trains" that the Five hear about on a lonely moor. The book has been adapted to two television series.

== Plot ==
Julian, Dick, George (full name Georgina), Anne and Timmy the dog are planning to go camping at a moor with the absent-minded and insect-loving Mr Luffy, a master at Julian and Dick's school. When they arrive at camp they find that the site is close to a farm. They discover several old railway tracks that run under the moors, some of them unused and also make friends with a boy named Jock, who lives at the farm with his mother and stepfather. While exploring the moor, the Five find a railway yard and a tunnel that are apparently abandoned. A watchman called Wooden Leg Sam tells them that "Spook trains" travel along those tracks, before chasing them away.

The children visit the farm the next day and tell Jock about the spook trains. Jock has a boy called Cecil Dearlove inflicted on him who makes him play "soldiers" all day. Jock ends up scaring him and has to stay in his room all day, as a punishment by his stepfather. The Five are surprised to find that most of the farm labourers are not working properly although Jock's stepfather, Mr Andrews, has supplied the farm with expensive equipment and vehicles. When Mr Andrews hears about the spook trains, he warns the children to stay away from the railway yard and tries to prevent Jock from meeting the Five over the next few days.

Julian and Dick secretly set off with Jock over the next two nights to watch for the spook train, leaving the girls behind. They find that there is indeed a mysterious train travelling in the tunnel. The next day, George is furious when she finds that the boys left her behind, even taking out her anger on Anne. She later apologises but still refuses to join the others the next day and goes off with Timmy to try to find the spook trains by herself. She does find one, which enters a secret area behind a supposedly blocked-off section of the tunnel. Meanwhile, the boys explore the tunnel while Anne waits outside, but they are captured by some men led by Mr Andrews. Anne runs off to find Mr Luffy and eventually finds him, along with some police officers who are helping in the search for the missing Five. George, who had been hiding inside the train, rescues the boys and realising that the train is used for smuggling, try to find a way out of the tunnel. They are recaptured, but just in time Anne arrives with Mr Luffy and the police to free them. After being rounded up by Timmy, the criminals are arrested, and the Famous Five return to the farm.

== Adaptations ==
Five Go Off to Camp was adapted for an episode of the Famous Five television series in 1978, produced by Southern Television for ITV. In 1996, another Famous Five television series featured the story, and was first aired on 29 July 1996.

Five Go Off to Camp has also been adapted for a radio drama, while the gamebook The Haunted Railway Game (1983) was based on this novel.
