= Five Go Off in a Caravan =

1946 children's novel by Enid Blyton

- Original 1946 first edition cover
- Author: Enid Blyton
- Cover artist: Eileen Alice Soper
- Language: English
- Series: The Famous Five series
- Genre: Mystery, Adventure novel
- Publisher: Hodder & Stoughton
- Publication date: 1946
- Publication place: United Kingdom
- Media type: Print (hardcover and paperback)
- Preceded by: Five Go to Smuggler's Top
- Followed by: Five on Kirrin Island Again

Five Go Off in a Caravan is the fifth book in the Famous Five series by the British author Enid Blyton. It was first published in November 1946 by Hodder and Stoughton.

The book includes a circus boy character named Nobby, whose name was changed to Ned when publisher Hodder Children's Books made extensive editorial revisions to the Famous Five series of books.

== Plot ==
The Famous Five are holidaying at the family house of Julian, Dick and Anne. They befriend an orphaned circus boy, Ned, who has come into possession of a horse-drawn circus caravan. This inspires George to suggest a caravanning holiday which Julian's parents agree to and hire two caravans for the children.

They travel to Merran Lake, where they are reacquainted with Ned and meet various circus animals. The Five camp on a hillside, much to the annoyance of Ned's guardian, Tiger Dan (called Uncle Dan by Ned) and an acrobat named Lou, who want them to leave. One of the children's caravans is directly above the entrance to a network of caves, where Tiger Dan and Lou have hidden stolen valuables.

Assisted by Ned, Timmy and a chimpanzee named Pongo, the four children manage to outwit the crooks. After the criminals are arrested, Ned leaves the circus to live with a local farming couple and look after their horses.

== Characters ==
- George (full name Georgina) - a tomboy
- Julian - a boy, the eldest of the four
- Dick - a boy
- Anne - a girl, the youngest of the four
- Timmy (full name Timothy) - George's pet-dog

Family Members:

- Uncle Quentin - father of George, uncle of Julian, Dick and Anne
- Aunt Fanny - mother of George, aunt of Julian, Dick and Anne

Circus Members:

- Ned (originally Nobby) - a circus boy
- Tiger Dan - the chief clown of the circus, Ned's guardian
- Lou (real name Lewis Allburg) - an acrobat, friend of Tiger Dan
- Pongo - a chimpanzee
