= Five on Finniston Farm =

1960 children's novel by Enid Blyton

Five On Finniston Farm
- Original 1960 first edition cover
- Author: Enid Blyton
- Illustrator: Eileen A. Soper
- Language: English
- Series: The Famous Five series
- Genre: Mystery, Adventure novel
- Publisher: Hodder & Stoughton
- Publication date: 1960
- Publication place: United Kingdom
- Media type: Print (hardcover and paperback)
- Preceded by: Five Get into a Fix
- Followed by: Five Go to Demon's Rocks

Five on Finniston Farm is the eighteenth novel in the Famous Five series by Enid Blyton. It was first published in 1960.

== Plot ==
The Famous Five spend their summer holidays at Finniston Farm as paying guests. Upon arrival, they are greeted by the pleasant Mrs Philpot and her identical twins, Henry and Harriet. The twins seem to take an instant dislike to the Five, who also meet two fellow paying guests: an American Mr Henning and his son, Junior. Mr Henning plans to buy antique pieces from the farm and sell them in America. Mr and Mrs Philpot agree to sell their farm treasures as they need the money. However the family's hot-tempered Great Granddad feels the antiques should remain in England.

Mr Henning and Junior prove themselves a nuisance to the household by rudely ordering around Mrs Philpot. Sympathetic to her, the Five offer to help with farm chores. When Junior demands breakfast in bed, George teaches him a lesson, making him agree to be more pleasant. This wins the hearts of the twins and they make friends with the Five.

Anne and George visit a nearby antique shop, owned by a Mr Finniston, who tells them about a secret passage from Finniston Castle to an old chapel and cellars where royal treasure might be hidden. The girls excitedly reveal the news to the boys and the twins. Together, they plan to hunt for the cellars on the farm. They come across the castle's kitchen midden and realize they are close to finding the treasure.

Junior spies on them and goes to break the news to his father and his father's friend, Mr Durleston, who decide to excavate the castle site, find the fortune and sell the antique treasure in America. Mr and Mrs Philpot consent to the excavation, much to the dismay of the children. The children dig around the site, hoping to beat the men in finding the treasure. Initially they are unsuccessful but the twins' dog, Snippet and their jackdaw, Nosey lead them to a burrow, beneath which the secret passage stretches out.

The children discover the cellars and the treasure including old daggers, sword and gold, which are worth a fortune; only to become trapped inside the tunnel when the entrance caves in. They take another way and reach a trapdoor under the old chapel, which is now used as a storehouse. The farmhands Bill and Jamie hear their shouts and let them out. The children get back to the farm and tell their exciting story to the astonished adults. The next day, Mr Henning and Mr Durleston try to trick the Philpots into believing the site has no treasure and offer them a meagre amount. However, Mr Philpot, backed up by his granddad and Mr (William) Finniston, declines the offer, making it clear they will excavate the site themselves and no longer want the Americans to stay. The adventure ends with Julian, Dick, Anne and George along with Timmy planning to stay at the farm to observe the excavation of the treasure.
