= Five Have Plenty of Fun =

1955 children's novel by Enid Blyton

Five Have Plenty Of Fun
- First edition
- Author: Enid Blyton
- Illustrator: Eileen A. Soper
- Language: English
- Series: The Famous Five series
- Genre: Mystery, Adventure novel
- Publisher: Hodder & Stoughton
- Publication date: 1955
- Publication place: United Kingdom
- Media type: Print (hardcover and paperback)
- Preceded by: Five Go to Mystery Moor
- Followed by: Five on a Secret Trail

Five Have Plenty Of Fun is the 14th novel in The Famous Five series by Enid Blyton. It was first published in 1955 by Hodder & Stoughton.

== Plot ==
Siblings Julian, Dick and Anne have come to Kirrin to spend the remainder of a school holiday with their tomboy cousin, George, and her dog, Timmy. Two scientist colleagues of George's father, Uncle Quentin, visit Kirrin Cottage to work on an alternative energy project. One of them is a large friendly American, Elbur Wright. His only daughter, Berta, is later threatened with being kidnapped and ransomed for the project's secrets. Elbur decides to send Berta to Kirrin for her safety. George takes an instant disliking to Berta, especially as the American girl has brought her dog, a poodle called Sally. George's resentment is furthered when Berta's hair is cut short to make her resemble a boy. Berta is also dressed as a boy and referred to as Lesley to throw the kidnappers off her scent.

A few days later, Uncle Quentin receives an urgent message to meet with Elbur to discuss calculations for their energy project. He leaves with his wife, Aunt Fanny, and plans to be gone for a week, leaving the children alone with Joanna, the cook. That night, George lends Timmy to protect Berta in Joan's bedroom, while Sally is put in George's bedroom. Irked by the poodle, George decides to put her outside in Timmy's kennel but the kidnappers are waiting and seize George, mistaking her for Berta.

The next day, Julian, Dick and Anne eventually realise that George has been kidnapped instead of Berta. For her safety, they send Berta away to stay with Joanna's cousin, with whom the children's gypsy friend, Jo, also lives. Berta is dressed as a simple country girl and is now called Jane. Julian, Dick and Anne then find clues left by George, including a slip of paper with the word 'Gringo' written on it. Through Jo, the children learn that Gringo runs a fair. Jo's friend at the fair, Spiky, points them in the direction of Gringo's caravan, where George had until recently been held captive. Julian enlists the help of a local garage worker, Jim, to find out the recent movements of Gringo's distinctive car. They soon have directions to a house where they suspect George is being held.

That night, Julian and Dick set off with Timmy to find George. Jo secretly follows them. The boys eventually find George, but the three are then caught and locked in a room. Jo and Timmy rescue them and the crooks are locked up. The children return to Kirrin Cottage and tell their tale to Anne and Joanna. After an enormous breakfast, they all fall asleep. Aunt Fanny, Uncle Quentin, Elbur and Berta later that morning arrive at Kirrin Cottage. The police are summoned and instructed to arrest the men locked in the house. Elbur consents to Berta staying longer at Kirrin with her new friends. Finally, Dick proposes to write their adventure down in a book and call it 'Five Have Plenty Of Fun'.
