= Famous Five (film) =

2012 German children's film directed by Mike Marzuk

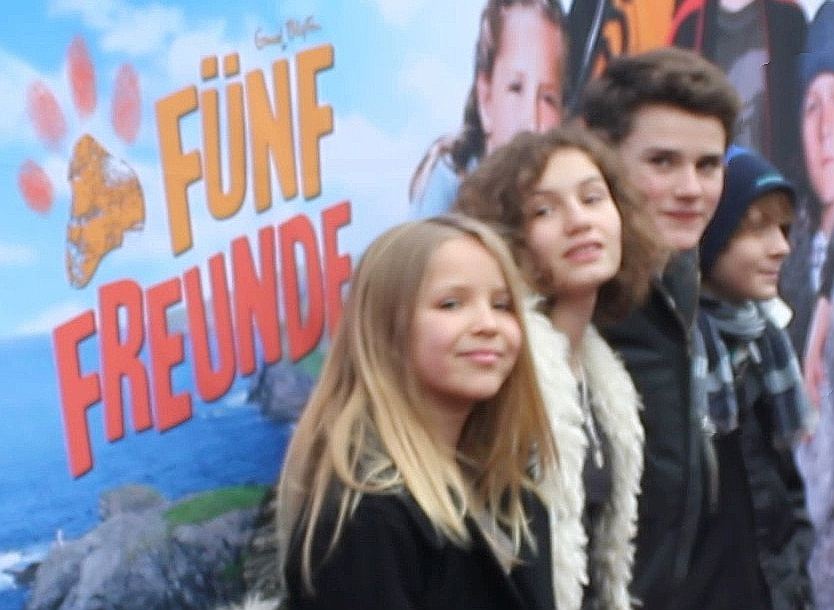
- The actors of Anne, George, Julian and Dick
- Directed by: Mike Marzuk
- Written by: Peer Klehmet; Sebastian Wehlings; Enid Blyton (novel)
- Based on: The Famous Five by Enid Blyton
- Produced by: Andreas Ulmke-Smeaton; Ewa Karlström
- Starring: Valeria Eisenbart; Quirin Oettl; Justus Schlingensiepen; Neele Marie Nickel; Coffey the Dog; Armin Rohde; Sebastian Gerold; Johann von Bülow; Anja Kling; Michael Fitz; Anatole Taubman; Anna Böttcher; Elyas M'Barek; Alwara Höfels; Marcus Harris
- Cinematography: Bernhard Jasper
- Edited by: Tobias Haas
- Music by: Wolfram de Marco
- Distributed by: Constantin Film
- Release date: 26 January 2012
- Running time: 93 minutes
- Country: Germany
- Language: German

Famous Five (German: Fünf Freunde) is a 2012 German children's film. Directed by Mike Marzuk, it is a film adaptation of The Famous Five series by Enid Blyton, which is based primarily on the 1947 book Five on Kirrin Island Again.

== Plot ==
Siblings Julian, Dick and Anne travel to their uncle Quentin's house. Georgina "George" Kirrin, Quentin's daughter, is forced to go cycling with her cousins and decides to take them to the "Teufelsfelsen" (Devil's Rock). En route, she has a race with Julian and wins by cheating. She leaves and cycles to the harbour to say goodbye to Quentin, who then travels to "Felseninsel" (Kirrin Island).

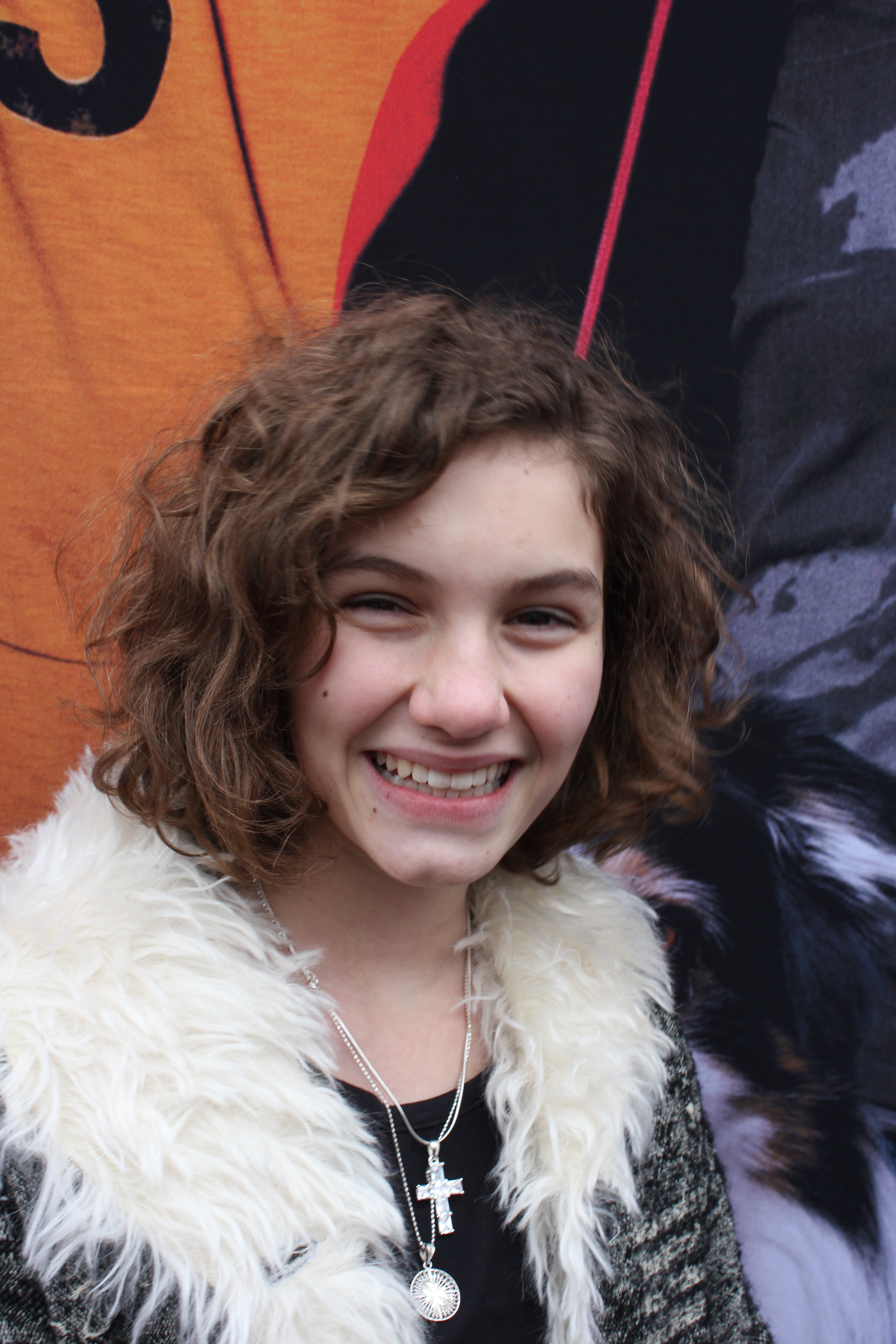
Valeria Eisenbart (2012) plays George

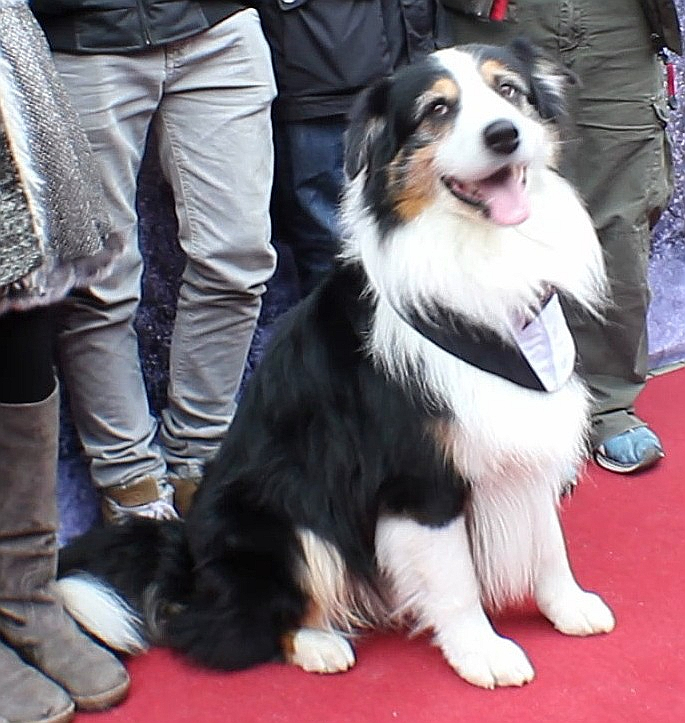
Filmdog Coffey plays Timmy

At Teufelsfelsen, the siblings hear a dog barking and, ignoring a sign that says "stay out, dangerous," enter a cave. Julian spots the dog, Timmy, at the bottom of a hole and climbs down to recue him. Timmy is banned from George's house, as he accidentally destroyed parts of Quentin's work and now lives with neighbour Mrs. Miller. With a rope, Dick and Anne try to pull Julian up but cannot hold his weight. They nearly drop him when George appears and helps them pull.

Together, they examine the cave and find a radio transmitter with a voice distortion device. They listen and answer to someone talking about a "professor." They realize that someone is after Quentin. At the police station, they convince officers Peters and Hansen to accompany them to the cave. Inside, the radio is gone, and there is no evidence that there ever was one. The children get a fine for illegally entering.

Meanwhile, Quentin is secretly developing a technique to produce electricity with plants. The children decide to unmask the people threatening him. The next morning, they decide to investigate the cave. En route, Anne notices someone installing a camera to spy on Felseninsel.

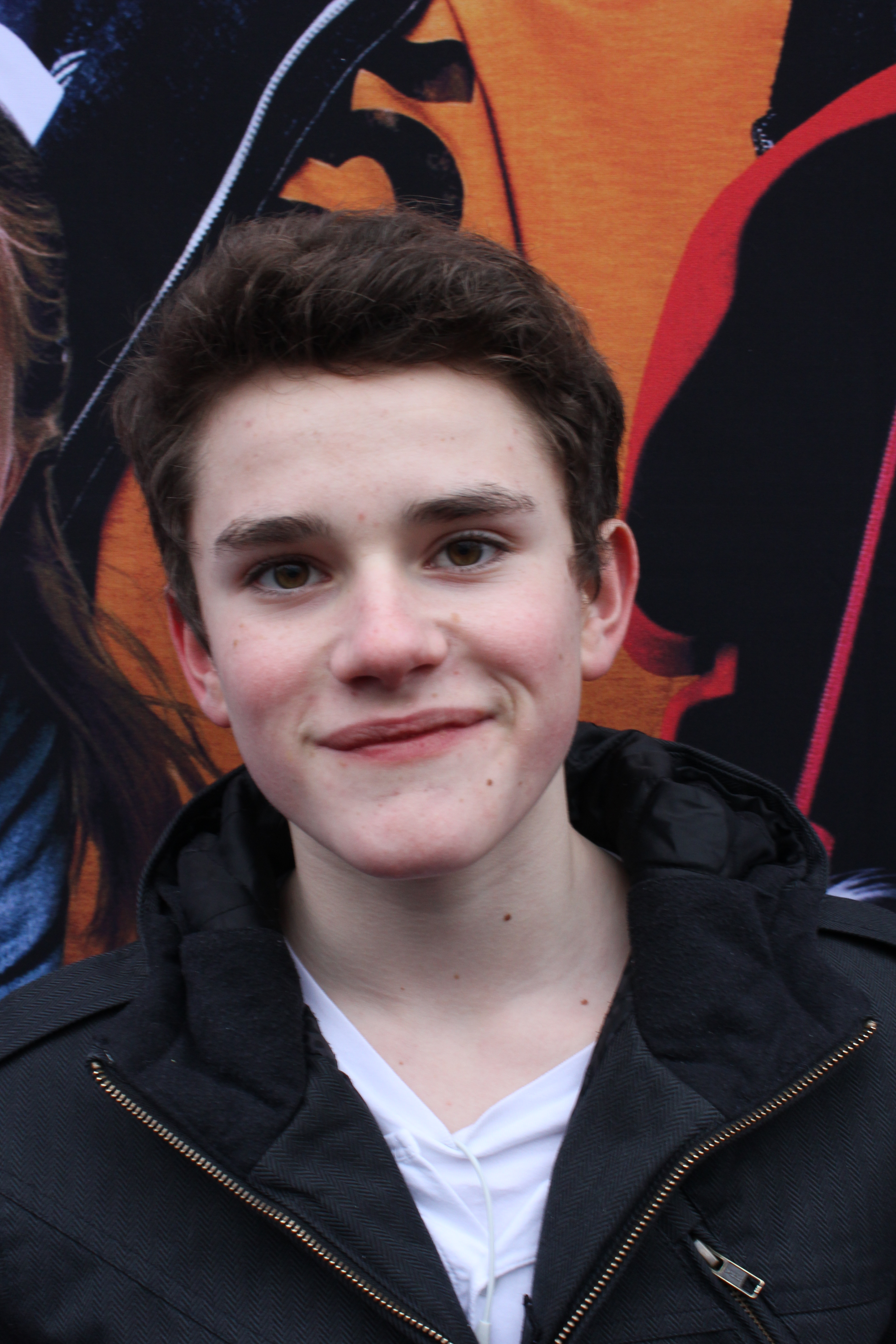
Quirin Oettl (2012) plays Julian

He turns out to be Peter Turner, an agent from a European secret service. His agency is surveilling Quentin, who refuses to receive help from them. While investigating the cave, Turner is attacked. Examining a piece of paper Dick picked up in the cave earlier, George finds the imprint of a signature. To find its author, they plan to get a signature from everyone in the village and compare it with the one they have.

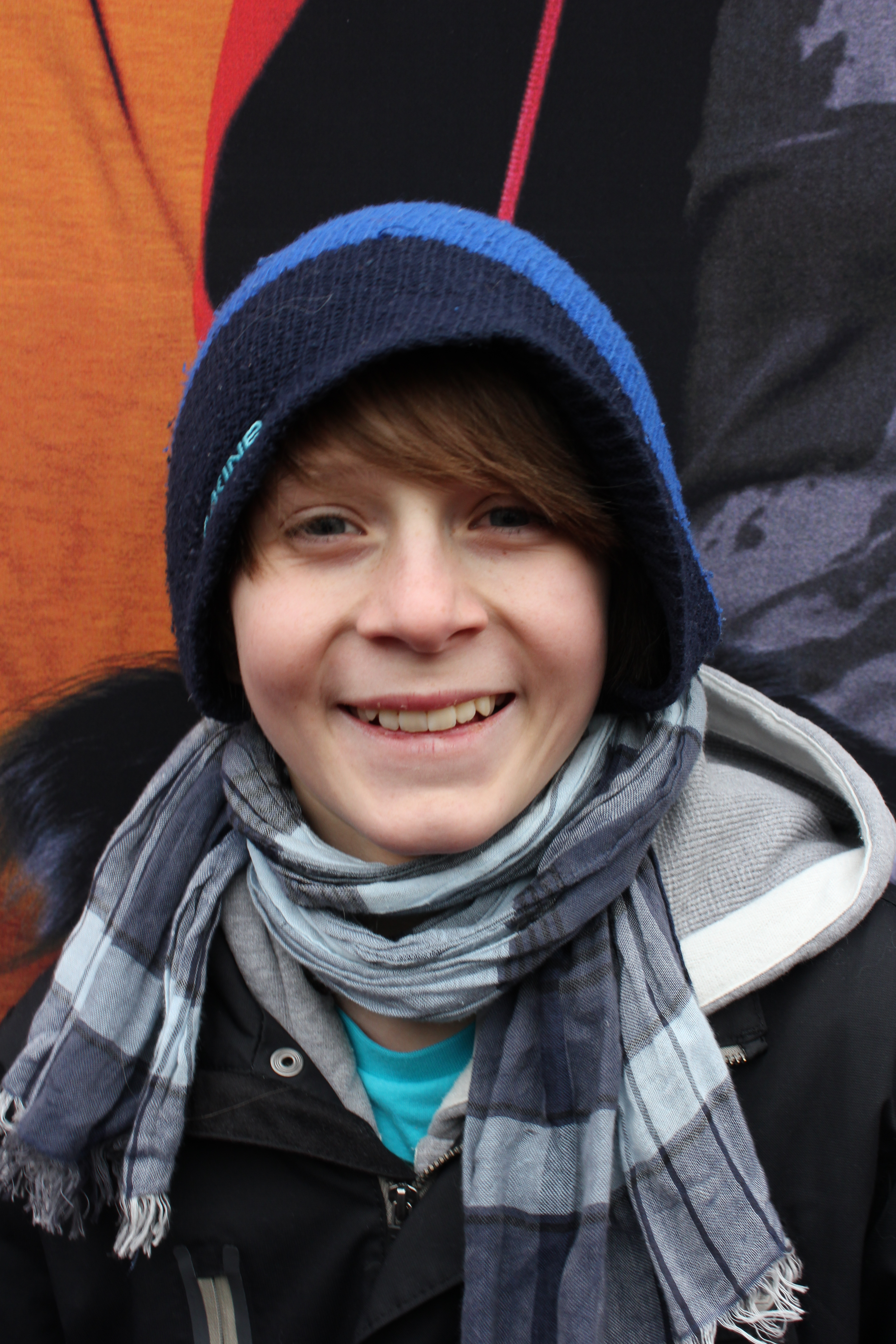
Justus Schlingensiepen (2012) plays Dick

While collecting signatures for a fake ecological campaign, Anne learns that a couple of birdwatching aficionados wants to visit Felseninsel. After failing to have found matching signatures, the friends investigate the couple, whose hovercraft can reach Felseninsel. The couple also has a pocketbook the children have seen in the cave earlier.

While George and Anne distract the couple, Julian and Dick get on the vehicle to sabotage it. Accidentally, they start the hovercraft and crash, destroying it. The couple, however, are real bird watchers and not criminals.

Because of this, the siblings' father orders them to go home. Later, George reads the fine they got for illegally entering the cave and realizes that Hansen's signature is the one the friends were looking for.

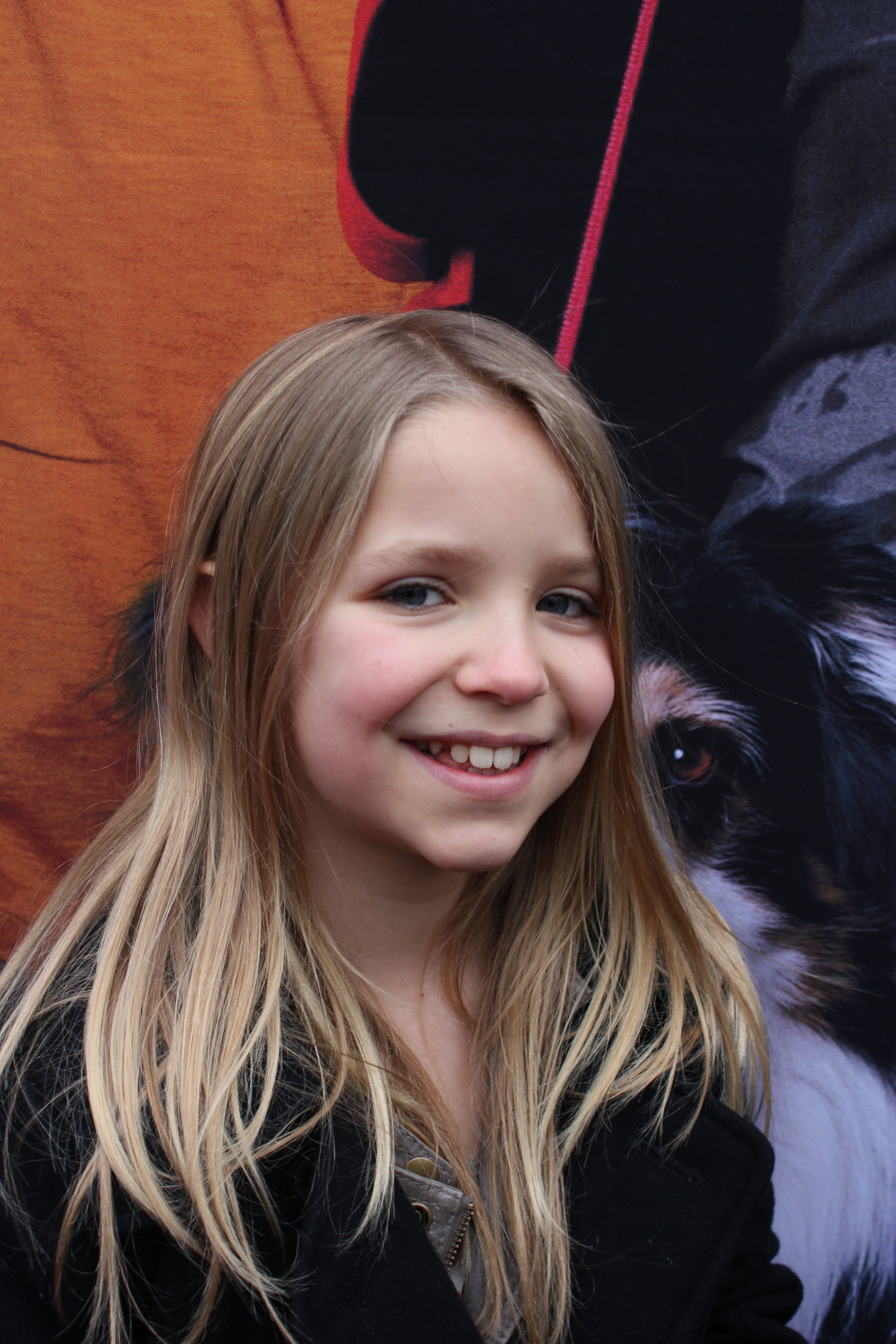
Neele Marie Nickel (2012) plays Anne

The next morning, Hansen enters the cave. George and Timmy follow him into an undersea tunnel that leads to Felseninsel. At Quentin's lab, George finds Quentin captured by Peters.

Peters and Hansen had set the friends on the wrong track so that they suspected the bird watchers. Quentin promises to surrender his invention if they promise not to hurt George. She is locked up with Turner in a cell under the lab, while Timmy flees and chases the bus carrying the siblings home. The trio see Timmy and stop the bus.

In the lab, Peters and Hansen force Quentin to copy all of his data onto their hard-drive. Following Timmy, the siblings get to George's cell. Together, the Five then subdue Hansen. Peters destroys Quentin's computer but gets trapped by the Five, who lock him up with Hansen.

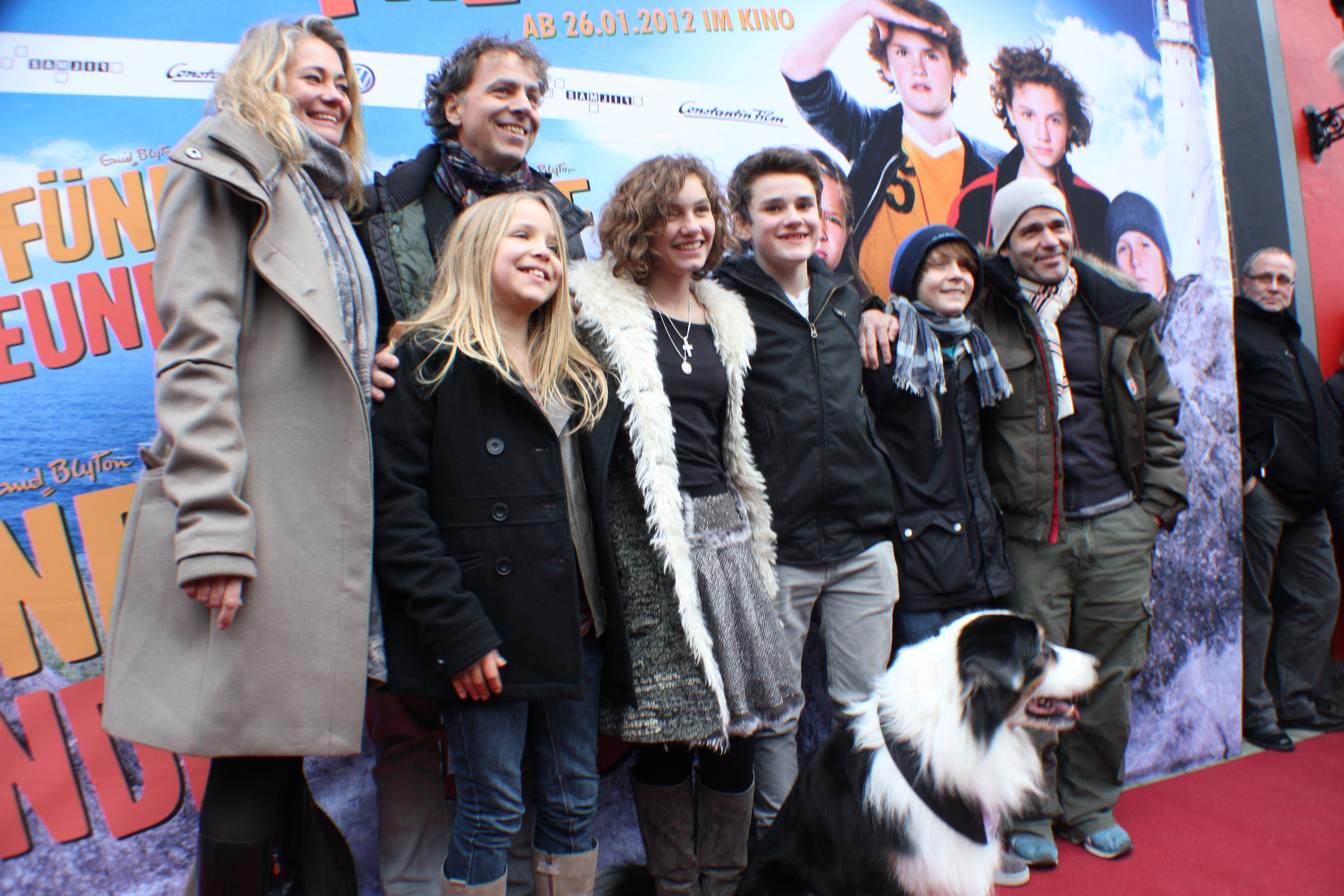
Producer, Actors, Director and the dog Coffey on the Schleswigpremiere of the movie Fünf Freunde

Mrs. Miller, who appears on Felseninsel, is actually Hansen and Peters's boss. She activates a bomb's timer and locks the Five up with Hansen and Peters, not willing to share profits with anybody.

Aided by Turner, the friends defuse the bomb. Timmy retrieves the hard-drive and is allowed to stay in the house. The criminals are brought to prison by Turner, who promises that his agency will compensate the bird watchers for their troubles.

== Background ==
Most parts of the movie were filmed in Schleswig, Germany, in summer 2011. Marcus Harris, the actor of Julian in the 1970s TV series The Famous Five, plays a concierge. Its premiere was on 26 January 2012 in Munich and a second in Schleswig, few days later. The film was invited to the 2012 TIFF Kids International Film Festival in Toronto.
