= Five Go Adventuring Again =

1943 children's novel by Enid Blyton

- Original First edition cover
- Author: Enid Blyton
- Illustrator: Eileen Alice Soper
- Language: English
- Series: The Famous Five series
- Genre: Mystery, Adventure novel
- Publisher: Hodder & Stoughton
- Publication date: 1943
- Publication place: United Kingdom
- Media type: Print (hardcover and paperback)
- Preceded by: Five on a Treasure Island (1942)
- Followed by: Five Run Away Together (1944)

Five Go Adventuring Again (published in 1943) is the second book in the Famous Five series by British author Enid Blyton.

== Plot ==
Julian, Dick, and Anne's mother is ill with scarlet fever, so they, George, and Timmy return to Kirrin Cottage for the Christmas holidays. Uncle Quentin, who is working on a secret theory in his study, takes a break to hire a tutor, Mr. Roland, to help Julian and Dick catch up with schoolwork they missed while sick. George is also required to attend the lessons, as she has just spent her first term at Gaylands boarding school and is behind her age level.

The day before lessons commence, the children visit the old house at Kirrin Farm, which is run by Mr. and Mrs. Sanders. Mrs. Sanders informs the children that two artists from London have booked a three-week stay at the house. The children explore some old secret hole in the house, they also find a cupboard with a false back. When searching a cavity in a wall, Dick finds an old book of medical treatment recipes and a linen map inscribed with Latin words. The children take the map back to Kirrin Cottage, where Julian guesses that it shows a "secret way" but he is unable to decipher the other words. Much to George's chagrin, Julian later shows the map to Mr. Roland, asking him what the words mean. He confirms that it is about a "secret way" and also about an east-facing room with eight wooden panels.

Later, Timmy is banished outside to his kennel for attacking Mr. Roland. Next, Uncle Quentin's secret papers are stolen. George suspects Mr. Roland, but cannot immediately convince the others. The children later discover the "secret way" (which was in Uncle Quentin's laboratory after all) which leads to the two artists' room in Kirrin Farm and George uncovers the stolen papers by mistake and they try to escape through the secret way, but the thieves almost outrun them but retreat when George threatens to set Timmy loose on them. The five also discover that Mr. Roland was behind them and imprison Mr. Roland and the two artists behind a room until the police arrive and arrest them.

== Characters ==
- Uncle Quentin (Scientist, George's Father)
- Aunt Fanny (Quentin's Wife, George's Mother)
- Georgina (George)
- Julian
- Dick
- Anne
- Timothy (Dog)
- Mr. Roland (Fraud Tutor)
- Mr & Mrs Sanders
- Mr Wilton
- Mr Thomas
- Joanna
