= Paul Child (actor) =

British actor

Paul Child (born 1983) is an English actor and musician. He is best known for playing the part of Dick in the 1996/7 television adaptation of Enid Blyton’s The Famous Five.

He has appeared in several television shows such as The Bill, The Worst Witch, Maisie Raine, My Hero, Murder Investigation Team and Tomorrow's Forecast.

He is now retired from the media scene and has returned to anonymity since 2012, after disbanding his musical group, Paul Child Band (2010–2012).

His old website mentioned his interests as swimming and football.
