= The Famous Five =

Series of children's novels by Enid Blyton

- First edition cover of the first book in the series Five on a Treasure Island
- Five on a Treasure Island; Five Go Adventuring Again; Five Run Away Together; Five Go to Smuggler's Top; Five Go Off in a Caravan; Five on Kirrin Island Again; Five Go Off to Camp; Five Get into Trouble; Five Fall into Adventure; Five on a Hike Together; Five Have a Wonderful Time; Five Go Down to the Sea; Five Go to Mystery Moor; Five Have Plenty of Fun; Five on a Secret Trail; Five Go to Billycock Hill; Five Get into a Fix; Five on Finniston Farm; Five Go to Demon's Rocks; Five Have a Mystery to Solve; Five Are Together Again
- Author: Enid Blyton
- Country: United Kingdom
- Language: English
- Genre: Children's literature; Mystery; Adventure
- Publisher: Hodder & Stoughton
- Published: 1942—1963
- Media type: Print (hardback & paperback)
- No. of books: 21

The Famous Five is a series of children's adventure novels and short stories written by English author Enid Blyton. The first book, Five on a Treasure Island, was published in 1942. The novels feature the adventures of a group of young children – Julian, Dick, Anne, George – and their dog Timmy.

The vast majority of the stories take place in the children's school holidays. Whenever they meet, they become involved in an adventure, often featuring criminals or lost treasure. Sometimes the scene is set close to George's family home at Kirrin Cottage, such as the picturesque Kirrin Island, owned by George and her family in Kirrin Bay. George's own home and various other houses the children visit or stay in are hundreds of years old and often contain secret passages or smugglers' tunnels.

In some books the children go camping in the countryside, on a hike or holiday together elsewhere. However, the settings are almost always rural and enable the children to discover the simple joys of cottages, islands, the English and Welsh countryside and sea shores, as well as an outdoor life of picnics, bicycle trips and swimming. (Note: The supposed quotation "lashings of ginger beer" does not appear in any of the books and the earliest reference is in the television parody Five Go Mad in Dorset.)

Blyton originally planned to write only six or eight books in the series, but due to their strong sales and great commercial success, she ended up writing twenty-one full-length Famous Five novels, along with several other series in a similar style featuring groups of children uncovering crimes while on holiday. By the end of 1953, more than six million copies had been sold. Today, more than two million copies of the books are sold each year, making them one of the best-selling series for children ever written, with sales totalling over a hundred million. All the novels have been adapted for television, and several have been adapted as films in various countries.

Blyton's publisher, Hodder & Stoughton, first used the term "The Famous Five" in 1951, after nine books in the series had been published. Before this, the series was referred to as The 'Fives' Books.

== Characters ==
=== The Five ===
- Julian is the oldest of the five, cousin to George and elder brother to Dick and Anne. He is tall, strong and intelligent as well as caring, responsible and kind. His cleverness and reliability are often noted by Aunt Fanny. He is the leader of the group and is very protective towards Anne and sometimes, to her frustration, towards George. Julian is the most mature of the group but, although well-meaning, his manner can at times come over as overbearing, pompous or priggish. At the start of the series, Julian is 12 years old. Over time, he reaches his goal of fully maturing into a young adult.
- Dick has a cheeky sense of humour, but is also dependable and kind in nature. He is the same age as his cousin George, 1 year younger than his brother Julian and a year older than his sister Anne – eleven at the start of the series. Though inclined to tease his sister at times, Dick is, like Julian, very caring towards Anne and does his best to keep her cheered up when she gets upset. He had a heroic role in Five on a Treasure Island. He uses his wits and saves the five in many adventures but probably has the least clearly-drawn character of the four cousins.
- Anne is the youngest in the group, and generally takes care of the domestic duties during the Five's various camping holidays. As the youngest, she is more likely than the others to be frightened, and does not really enjoy the adventures as much as the others. She is ten years old in the first book of the series. She sometimes lets her tongue run away with her, but ultimately she is as brave and resourceful as the others. She likes doing the domestic things such as planning, organizing and preparing meals, and keeping where they are staying clean and tidy, be it a cave, house, tent or caravan. In Smuggler's Top it is suggested she is claustrophobic, as she is frightened of enclosed spaces, which remind her of bad dreams. But the adventures invariably lead the five into tunnels, down wells, and into dungeons and other enclosed spaces, demonstrating how brave she really is.
- George (actually, Georgina) is Julian, Dick and Anne's cousin. She is a tomboy who demands that people call her George instead of Georgina; she cuts her hair very short and dresses like a boy. She is headstrong and courageous by nature and, like her father, scientist Quentin Kirrin, has a hot and fiery temper. Introduced to the other characters in the first book, she later attends a boarding school with Anne where the teachers also agree to call her 'George'. Blyton eventually revealed that the character was based on herself. It is notable that the chief protagonist of the Malory Towers stories also possessed a fiery temper as a defining character trait. George has a loyal dog named Timmy who would do anything for her. She often gets cross when anyone calls her by her birth name or makes fun of Timmy, and she loves it when somebody calls her George or mistakes her for a boy. In Five Get into a Fix, old Mrs Janes mistakes her for a boy: even though Julian had told her that she was a girl, she later forgets this. George sometimes takes this to the point of asking that her name be prefixed with Master instead of Miss. Various references have been made to what meaning should be read into this – for instance "I remember reading in my first Famous Five book about a girl called Master George. What a puzzle and thrill. She claims to never tell lies as that is cowardly."
- Timothy Alias Timmy is George's faithful dog. He is a large, brown mongrel with a long tail. George adopted him after finding him abandoned on the moors as a puppy. He is very friendly; he is clever, affectionate and loyal to the children and to George in particular; he provides physical protection for them many times. Timmy's presence is frequently given as the reason the children's parents allow them to wander unsupervised. George adores Timmy and thinks that he is the best dog in the world, and often becomes furious when people insult or threaten him. This is shown in 'Five On A Secret Trail' when she runs away from home with Timmy because he was being teased as he was forced to wear a cardboard collar. In the first book of the series, George's parents have forbidden her to keep Timmy, and she is forced to hide him with a fisher boy in the village. After the end of the Five's first adventure, her parents relent and she is allowed to keep him in the house and also take him with her to boarding school. It is a notable feature of the stories that Timmy's thoughts and feelings are frequently described.

=== Friends the Five meet ===
- Alf, the fisherboy, appears in some of the books set in Kirrin Cottage. In the first book, after George's parents forbid her to keep the dog, Alf keeps Timmy for her. Timmy adores Alf. Alf also looks after George's boat. In later books Alf only looks after George's boat, as George's parents let Timmy stay in the house. Alf also appears as James of the same background. In book 6 a fisher boy named James is mentioned but with the same background as Alf and readers speculate Blyton may have meant the same person.
- Jo, the ragamuffin girl, clever but wild, joins the Five on three adventures throughout the series. She is approximately the same age as the children and is a tomboy like George. Her parents were in the circus, but her mother died and her father was imprisoned for theft. She admires Dick and thinks the world of him.
- Joanna/Joan is the housekeeper at George's house. She is an extremely kind woman who is often present at Kirrin Cottage when Uncle Quentin and Aunt Fanny go off somewhere. All the four cousins are extremely attached to her. Joanna contracts scarlet fever in the last book. She is sometimes referred to as Joan in Blyton's Famous Five short stories like Five Have a Puzzling Time and other stories.
- Tinker appears in two books. He has a habit of imitating cars (which drives his father mad) and has a pet monkey called Mischief. His father is also a scientist who is Uncle Quentin's friend.
- Spiky is a friend of Jo's who works in the circus. The Five meet in him in the fourteenth book in the series, Five Have Plenty of Fun.
- Wilfred meets the Five in the book Five Have a Mystery to Solve. He has an inexplicable ability to attract animals.
- Sooty/Pierre (Pierre Lenoir) is in the same form as Dick in school. He is known for his hair that holds a resemblance to soot and therefore inherited the name Sooty. He welcomed the five to his home at Smuggler's Top in Five go to Smuggler's Top and aids them in solving the mystery of signallers and smuggling at smugglers top.
- Nobby (Ned in some more recent editions) is part of a troupe of circus folk who travel in caravans. He befriends the five in Five Go Off in a Caravan. He lives a hard life with his uncle known as 'Tiger Dan' and acrobat Lou. He gives the Five the idea of a caravaning holiday. The character of Nobby was later renamed "Ned" in some editions from 2010, in an attempt to modernise the text.
- Henry/Henrietta is a member of the riding school that Anne and George visit in Five Go to Mystery Moor. She is well known for having disputes with George as both girls badly want to be a boy and are jealous of each other, although she gets on with the rest of the Five. She is sometimes referred to as 'Harry' to her best friends.
- Toby is a friend of Julian and Dick's who lets the five stay on his farm near Billycock Hill in Five go to Billycock Hill. He has a cousin called Jeff who is a flight lieutenant at the nearby airfield. He is a bit of a joker as he likes to play tricks.
- Yan likes to follow the five around to their annoyance when they were staying on Tremannon Farm in Cornwall for the holidays in Five Go Down to Sea. He enjoys eating the five's sweets and shows them places in the area such as 'The Wrecker's Way' and the tower.
- Guy and Harry Lordler are met by Anne and George on a hike in Five on a Secret Trail. They are identical twins which confuses the five, who thought that there was only Guy, until they find Harry upset at Guy being abducted. Guy and Harry are often in conflict with each other and ignore each other. Guy owns a Roman camp as his father is a famous archeologist, and has a dog named Jet.
- Henry and Harriet, 'The Harries' are children of Mrs Philpot who lets the five stay on Finniston Farm in Five on Finniston Farm. They are often eager to help their mother with chores and are very busy. They hold a grudge against Junior, the irritable American boy featured in the book. They own a dog called Snippet and a crow called Nosy. While they initially talk as one, after George gets one over on Junior the Harrys start acting more as individuals around the others, and reveal a scar on Harry's cheek that is the only way to tell them apart.
- Berta is the daughter of Elbur Wright, a colleague of Uncle Quentin and is featured in Five Have Plenty of Fun. Elbur is threatened with the kidnapping of Berta if Elbur and Uncle Quentin do not reveal project secrets.She consequently stays with the five and has to change her name to 'Lesley' as well as look like a boy to avoid being kidnapped, to the resentment of George. She has a dog called Sally.
- Richard Kent is the son of Thurlow Kent, who is very wealthy and features in the book Five Get Into Trouble. He is known for his cowardly nature for which he is mocked by the five. His father had a body guard named 'Rooky' who Richard resents but is also fears. Rooky tries to hunt down Richard and kidnap him for ransom.

=== Grown-ups in the Famous Five ===
- Aunt Fanny is George's mother, and aunt to Dick, Julian and Anne. She is married to Uncle Quentin, and is, through most of Blyton's Famous Five novels, the principal maternal figure in the lives of the children. She is a very kind and easy-going woman, and shows considerable patience with her husband over his short temper and absent-mindedness.
- Uncle Quentin is George's father, and a world-famous scientist, who is kidnapped or held hostage in several of the children's adventures. He possesses a quick temper and has little tolerance for the children on school holidays, but is nevertheless a loving and caring husband, father and uncle, and is extremely proud of his daughter. He is also inclined to be very absent-minded, as he finds it hard to switch off from his work and readjust to everyday life. Despite his fame as a scientist, his work does not earn him much money. In the first book of the series, it is established that he is brother to the father of Julian, Dick and Anne.
- Julian, Dick and Anne's mother is a very nice woman. In Five Go Off In a Caravan, she persuades the children's father to let them travel in the caravan. She's referred to as Mrs. Barnard in Five Get Into a Fix.
- Julian, Dick and Anne's father is introduced in the first book in the series, Five on a Treasure Island, however he is not named.

== Critical discussion ==
Blyton was a nature writer early in her career, and the books are strongly atmospheric, with a detailed but idealised presentation of the rural landscape. The books present children exploring this landscape without parental supervision as natural and normal. Pete Cash of the English Association has noted that the children "are allowed to go off on their own to an extent that today would contravene the Child Protection Act (1999) and interest Social Services."

The books are written in a nostalgic style even for the time they were written, avoiding reference to specific political events or technological developments. Cash noted that the characters do not watch television apart from one appearance in 1947, or even make much use of radios, despite George's father's work presumably involving advanced technology.

The books have been criticised for being repetitive, with repeated use of stock elements such as obnoxious, unfriendly people who turn out to be criminals and the discovery of a secret passageway. Blyton wrote rapidly and could finish a book in a week, which meant that unlike other book series of the period, such as Nancy Drew or The Hardy Boys, she was able to maintain control of her creations and write all the stories in a series herself.

The books portray girls differently, contrasting Anne—the youngest and most delicate character—with the bold and headstrong George.

=== Floating timeline ===
The seemingly perpetual youth of the Famous Five, who experience a world of apparently endless holidays while not ageing significantly is known as a floating timeline. Floating timelines enable an episodic series without a set endpoint, but this comes at the cost of losing the sense of characters growing and maturing.

== Bibliography ==
=== Enid Blyton's "Famous Five" novel series ===
1. Five on a Treasure Island (1942)
2. Five Go Adventuring Again (1942)
3. Five Run Away Together (1944)
4. Five Go to Smuggler's Top (1945)
5. Five Go Off in a Caravan (1946)
6. Five on Kirrin Island Again (1947)
7. Five Go Off to Camp (1948)
8. Five Get into Trouble (1949)
9. Five Fall into Adventure (1950)
10. Five on a Hike Together (1951)
11. Five Have a Wonderful Time (1952)
12. Five Go Down to the Sea (1953)
13. Five Go to Mystery Moor (1954)
14. Five Have Plenty of Fun (1955)
15. Five on a Secret Trail (1956)
16. Five Go to Billycock Hill (1957)
17. Five Get into a Fix (1958)
18. Five on Finniston Farm (1960)
19. Five Go to Demon's Rocks (1961)
20. Five Have a Mystery to Solve (1962)
21. Five Are Together Again (1963)

Blyton also wrote a number of short stories featuring the characters, which were collected together in 1995 as Five Have a Puzzling Time, and Other Stories.

=== Other book series ===
==== Claude Voilier ====
There are also books written originally in French by Claude Voilier (the Five have long been extremely popular in translation – by Voilier – in the French-speaking parts of Europe) and later translated into English. The Voilier titles are:

1. Les Cinq sont les plus forts (1971; English title: The Famous Five and the Mystery of the Emeralds, English number: 2)
2. Les Cinq au bal des espions (1971; English title: The Famous Five in Fancy Dress, English number: 7)
3. Le Marquis appelle les Cinq (1972; English title: The Famous Five and the Stately Homes Gang, English number: 1)
4. Les Cinq au Cap des tempêtes (1972; English title: The Famous Five and the Missing Cheetah, English number: 3)
5. Les Cinq à la Télévision (1973; English title: The Famous Five Go on Television, English number: 4)
6. Les Cinq et les pirates du ciel (1973; English title: The Famous Five and the Hijackers, English number: 13)
7. Les Cinq contre le masque noir (1974; English title: The Famous Five Versus the Black Mask, English number: 6)
8. Les Cinq et le galion d'or (1974; English title: The Famous Five and the Golden Galleon, English number: 5)
9. Les Cinq font de la brocante (1975; English title: The Famous Five and the Inca God, English number: 9)
10. Les Cinq se mettent en quatre (1975; English title: The Famous Five and the Pink Pearls, English number: 18)
11. Les Cinq dans la cité secrète (1976; English title: The Famous Five and the Secret of the Caves, English number: 12)
12. La fortune sourit aux Cinq (1976; English title: The Famous Five and the Cavalier's Treasure, English number: 10)
13. Les Cinq et le rayon Z (1977; English title: The Famous Five and the Z-Rays, English number: 17)
14. Les Cinq vendent la peau de l'ours (1977; English title: The Famous Five and the Blue Bear Mystery, English number: 8)
15. Les Cinq aux rendez-vous du diable (1978; English title: The Famous Five in Deadly Danger, English number: 15)
16. Du neuf pour les Cinq (1978; English title: The Famous Five and the Strange Legacy, English number: 11)
17. Les Cinq et le trésor de Roquépine (1979; English title: The Famous Five and the Knights' Treasure, English Number: 16)
18. Les Cinq et le diamant bleu (1979; reprinted in 1980 as Les Cinq et le rubis d'Akbar; (The Five and the Rubies Of Akbar))
19. Les Cinq jouent serré (1980; English title: The Famous Five and the Strange Scientist, English number: 14)
20. Les Cinq en croisière (1980; never translated into English; "The Five on a Cruise")
21. Les Cinq contre les fantômes (1981; never translated into English; "The Five Against the Ghosts")
22. Les Cinq en Amazonie (1983; never translated into English; "The Five in Amazonia")
23. Les Cinq et le trésor du pirate (1984; never translated into English; "The Five and the Pirate's Treasure")
24. Les Cinq contre le loup-garou (1985; never translated into English; "The Five against the werewolf")

==== The German "Geisterbände" ====
In Germany, two books came out with a questionable author. The titles are:

1. Fünf Freunde auf der verbotenen Insel ("Five Friends on the Forbidden Island") (1977)
2. Fünf Freunde und der blaue Diamant ("Five Friends and the Blue Diamond") (1979)

Although Enid Blyton is named as author on the cover, the books were most likely written by German author Brigitte Blobel, who is credited as the translator. The books were recalled after the first edition owing to copyright issues.

The New "Famous Five"

In 2025, author Chris Smith published "Five and the Forgotten Treasure" inspired by Enid Blyton that features "The New Famous Five" consisting of the three grandchildren of Dick, their dog Gilbert and George, who is now a professor living at Kirrin Cottage.

== Film and television adaptations ==
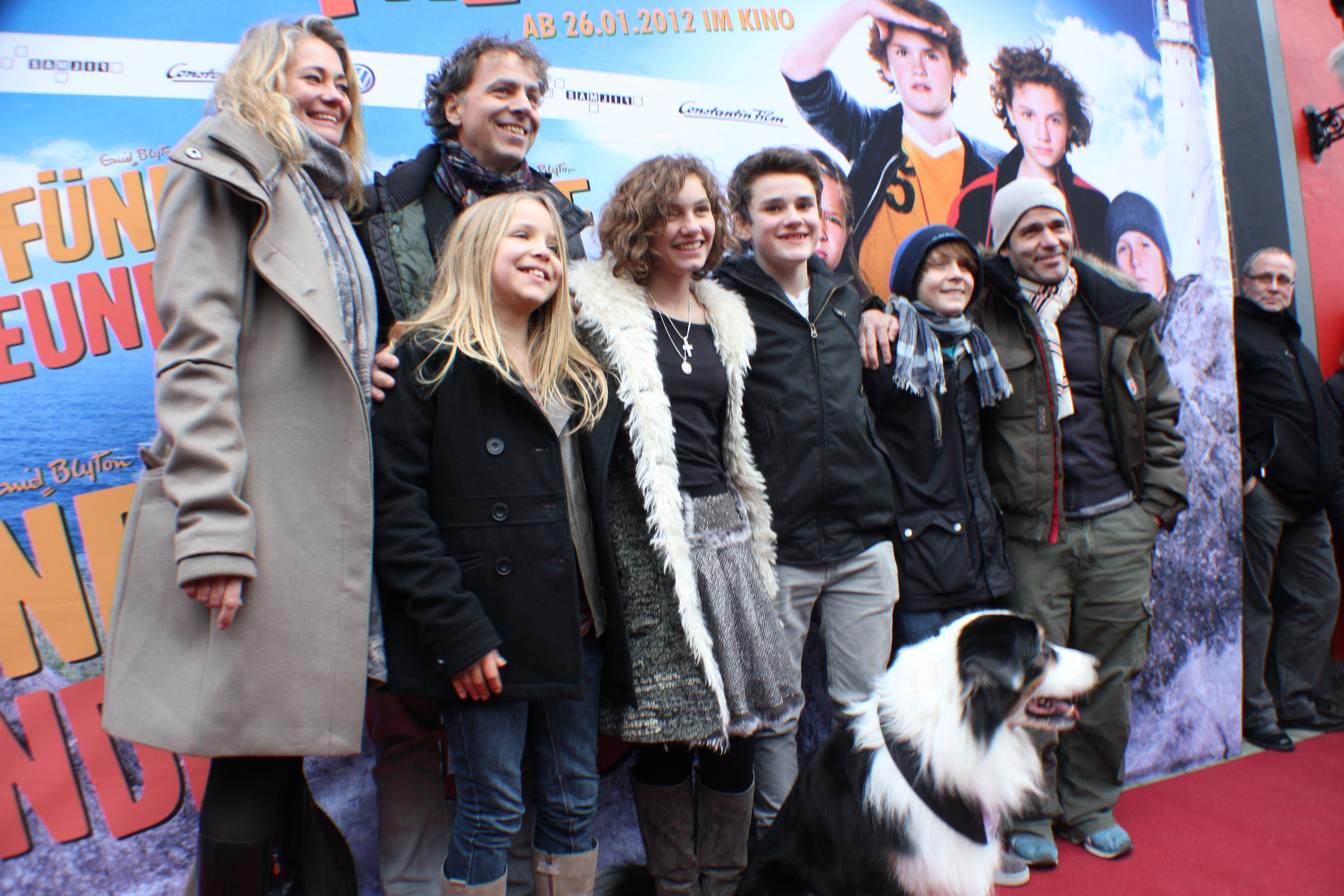
Producers, actors, director and the dog Coffey at the Schleswig premiere of the movie Fünf Freunde (translated into English The Famous Five Friends)

=== Films ===
The Children's Film Foundation made two films based on Famous Five books: Five on a Treasure Island, in 1957, and Five Have a Mystery to Solve, in 1964.

Two of the Famous Five stories by Enid Blyton have been filmed by Danish director Katrine Hedman. The cast consisted of Danish actors and were originally released in Danish. Ove Sprogøe stars as Uncle Quentin. The movies are: De fem og spionerne (Five and the Spies) (1969) and De 5 i fedtefadet (Famous Five Get in Trouble) (1970).

All four of the films have been released on DVD in their respective countries.

In Germany, a series of movies have been released:

- Fünf Freunde (2012, based on Five on Kirrin Island Again, with Marcus Harris in a small role)
- Fünf Freunde 2 (2013, based on Five Get into Trouble)
- Fünf Freunde 3 (2014, based on Five on a Treasure Island and Five Fall into Adventure)
- Fünf Freunde 4 (2015)
- Fünf Freunde und das Tal der Dinosaurier (2018, literally "Five Friends and the Valley of Dinosaurs")

=== Television ===
==== 1978–79 series ====
Jennifer Thanisch as Anne, Michele Gallagher as Georgina, Gary Russell as Dick, Marcus Harris as Julian from Famous Five (1978–79) television series

The Famous Five television series was produced by Southern Television and Portman Productions for ITV in the UK, in 26 episodes of thirty minutes (including time for advertisements). It starred Michele Gallagher as Georgina, Marcus Harris as Julian, Jennifer Thanisch as Anne, Gary Russell as Dick, Toddy Woodgate as Timmy, Michael Hinz as Uncle Quentin and Sue Best as Aunt Fanny. It also starred Ronald Fraser, John Carson, Patrick Troughton, James Villiers, Cyril Luckham and Brian Glover. The screenplays were written by Gloria Tors, Gail Renard, Richard Carpenter and Richard Sparks. The episodes were directed by Peter Duffell, Don Leaver, James Gatward and Mike Connor. The series was produced by Don Leaver and James Gatward. Most of the outdoor filming was done in the New Forest and parts of Dorset and Devon. The series was set in the present day, fifteen years after Blyton's last novel in the series.

Of the original 21 novels, three were not adapted for this series; Five on a Treasure Island and Five Have a Mystery to Solve because the Children's Film Foundation still own the film and TV rights to the books, while Five Have Plenty of Fun did not fit in the production schedule. Due to the success of the series, Southern Television were keen to make another season of episodes, but the Enid Blyton estate forbade them to create original stories.

The 1978 series was originally released on video by Portman Productions with reasonable regularity between 1983 and 1999, many of which are still easy to find second-hand, although the sound and picture quality is not always what it could be. A four-disc DVD collection, containing 23 of the 26 episodes produced for the 1978 series (and two episodes from the 1996 series) was released in region 4 (Australia and New Zealand) in 2005. The box and disc art identify it as a release of the 1996 series. (The distributor had licensed the 1996 series, but due to an administrative glitch was supplied with master tapes and artwork for the 1978 series.) The error was corrected in a later release.

A seven-DVD set containing the entire series and extensive bonus material was released in October 2010 in Germany by Koch Media; although there was an option to choose either the original English or German dubbed versions, the English version had non-removable German subtitles across the bottom of the screen on every episode. The same company released the DVD set in the UK (without the non-removable subtitles) on 25 June 2012.

A four DVD set containing all 26 episodes, without additional content, was released for region 4 (Australia and New Zealand) in late 2011, as Enid Blyton's The Famous Five: The Complete Collection. (The Finnish punk band Widows (of Helsinki) made three different cover versions of the theme song, the first in early 1979, as did the Irish indie outfit Fleur, in 1996.)

==== 1995 series ====
A later series, The Famous Five, initiated by Victor Glynn of Portman Zenith was aired first in 1995, a co-production between a number of companies including Tyne Tees Television, HTV, Zenith North and the German channel ZDF. Unlike the previous TV series, this set the stories in the 1950s, around when they were written. It dramatised all the original books. Of the juvenile actors the best known is probably Jemima Rooper, who played George. Julian was portrayed by Marco Williamson, Dick by Paul Child, and Anne by Laura Petela. In this series, because of the slang meaning of the word fanny, Aunt Fanny, played by Mary Waterhouse, was known as Aunt Frances. (In some but not all recent reprints of the book, the character has been re-christened Aunt Franny.)

The 1995 series was released in its entirety on VHS video. A three-disc DVD collection, containing 13 of the 26 episodes of the 1995 series, was released in Australia and New Zealand in 2005, and is marked "Revised Edition" to avoid confusion with the previous release of the 1979 series with 1995 artwork. A complete edition of the series was released on DVD in Australia and New Zealand in 2016. Other episodes have reportedly been released on DVD in Europe, but only the adaptation of Five on a Treasure Island was released on DVD in the UK.

==== Famous 5: On the Case ====
A new Famous Five animated TV series began airing in 2008. Famous 5: On the Case is set in modern times and features the children of the original Famous Five: Max (the son of Julian and Brandine), Dylan (son of Dick and Michelle), Jo (daughter of George and Ravi – a tomboy who, like her mother, prefers a shorter name to her given name Jyoti) and Allie (daughter of Anne and John). It has not been stated whether their dog is a descendant of Timmy. The new series was first announced in 2005, and is a co-production of Chorion (which currently owns all Famous Five rights) and Marathon, in association with France 3 and The Disney Channel. Disney confirmed their involvement in December 2006. Stories were developed by Douglas Tuber and Tim Maile, who have previously written for Lizzie McGuire. Chorion claims on its website that "these new programmes will remain faithful to the themes of mystery and adventure central to Enid Blyton's classic series of books." A total of 26 episodes, each 22 minutes long, were produced.

==== 2023 series ====
On 26 June 2023, the BBC announced that filming has begun on a new adaptation of The Famous Five, in co-production with the German channel ZDF. The series will comprise three episodes, each 90 minutes long, and will aim to bring the stories to a "progressive new audience". The series creator is Danish film director Nicolas Winding Refn.

== Other adaptations ==
=== Audio dramas ===
Hodder Headline produced in the late 1990s audio dramas in English, which were published on audio cassette and CD. All 21 episodes of the original books were dramatised.

The 21 original stories by Enid Blyton have been released in the 1970s as Fünf Freunde audio dramas in Germany as well. The speakers were the German dubbing artists for Gallagher, Thanisch, Russell and Harris, the leads of the first television series.

For the sequels (not written by Blyton and decidedly more "modern" action-oriented stories) the speakers were replaced by younger ones, because it was felt that they sounded too mature. In addition to the original Blyton books, another 110+ stories have subsequently been released and published as radio plays and more than 30 books different from the radioplays in Germany. They are based on the original characters, but written by various German writers.

=== Theatre ===
A 1997 musical was made to celebrate the 100th anniversary of Enid Blyton's birth with the title The Famous Five and later released on DVD as The Famous Five – Smuggler's Gold – The Musical.
Principal actors: Elizabeth Marsland, Lyndon Ogbourne, Matthew Johnson, Vicky Taylor, Jon Lee, Director: Roz Storey and also in the five

A brand new musical adaptation was premièred at the Tabard Theatre on 8 December 2009 and played until 10 January 2010.

=== Gamebooks ===
Two sets of gamebooks in a Choose Your Own Adventure style have been published. These books involve reading small sections of print and being given two or more options to follow, with a different page number for each option. The first series of these, written by Stephen Thraves, featured stories loosely based on the original books. They were issued in plastic wallets with accessories such as maps, dice and codebooks. The gamebooks were titled as follows:

1. The Wreckers' Tower Game, based on Five Go Down to the Sea
2. The Haunted Railway Game, based on Five Go Off to Camp
3. The Whispering Island Game, based on Five Have a Mystery to Solve
4. The Sinister Lake Game, based on Five On a Hike Together
5. The Wailing Lighthouse Game, based on Five Go to Demon's Rocks
6. The Secret Airfield Game, based on Five Go to Billycock Hill
7. The Shuddering Mountain Game, based on Five Get into a Fix
8. The Missing Scientist Game, based on Five Have a Wonderful Time

The second series, written by Mary Danby, was entitled "The Famous Five and You". These consisted of abridged versions of the original text, with additional text for the alternative story routes. The books in this series were based on the first six original Famous Five books:

1. The Famous Five and You Search for Treasure!
2. The Famous Five and You Find Adventure!
3. The Famous Five and You Run Away!
4. The Famous Five and You Search for Smugglers!
5. The Famous Five and You Take Off!
6. The Famous Five and You Underground!

=== Comics ===
A weekly comic strip based on the 1978 television series was published in Look-in magazine from 1978 to 1980.

Six comic albums drawn by Bernard Dufossé and scripted by Serge Rosenzweig and Rafael Carlo Marcello were released in France between 1982 and 1986, under the title Le Club des Cinq. Most of comic books in the series are based on Famous Five books created by Claude Voilier. Books were released by Hachette Livre. The first three of these volumes have also been released in English, under the name Famous Five. The titles included "Famous Five and the Golden Galleon" (which featured a sunken ship that was laden with gold with the Five fending off villains seeking to make off with the gold, "Famous Five and the Treasure of the Templars", where it transpires that Kirrin Castle is actually a Templar Castle that houses their hidden treasure which the Five ultimately secure with the help of members of the order, and "Famous Five and the Inca God" which was set in an antiquities museum and dealt with the theft of an Incan fetish.

Beginning in September 1985 a series of monthly Comic Magazine titles Enid Blyton's Adventure Magazine were published. Each issue published a full length illustrative comic book story adapted from Famous 5 Novels. The series came to end in the 1990s.

== Parodies ==
=== The Comic Strip Presents... ===
The Five inspired the parody Five Go Mad in Dorset (1982) and its 1983 sequel Five Go Mad on Mescalin, both produced by The Comic Strip, in which the characters express sympathies with Nazi Germany and opposition to the Welfare State, homosexuals, immigrants and Jews, in an extremely broad parody not so much of Blyton but of views perceived to be common in the 1950s. The parodies were deliberately set towards the end of the original Famous Five "era" (1942–63) so as to make the point that the books were already becoming outmoded while they were still being written. Both parodies made use of Famous Five set pieces, such as the surrender of the criminals at the end when Julian states "We're the Famous Five!", the arrival of the police just in the nick of time, and the appeal for "some of your home-made ices" at a village shop. Unlike the books, the four children in the Comic Strip parody are all siblings, and none is the child of Aunt Fanny and Uncle Quentin.

The series was revived in 2012 with Five Go to Rehab, with the original cast reprising their roles, now well into middle-age. Reuniting for Dick's birthday after decades apart, the four and Toby lament how their lives took unexpected paths while Dick drags them on another bicycle adventure, which he had meticulously planned for fourteen years. In a reversal, George had married a series of wealthy men whom she cuckolded with, among others, one of her stepsons (her continuing penchant for bestiality with the latest Timmy is also implied); whereas Anne has become a strongly opinionated vegan spinster and is suspected by Dick of being a "dyke" – an accusation made against George by Toby in the original Five Go Mad in Dorset. George and Julian have been committed to an alcoholics' sanatorium, the latter owes a large debt to African gangsters, and Anne recently served a prison sentence for setting her nanny aflame. Robbie Coltrane reprised both of his roles. Five Go to Rehab utilises a form of a floating timeline; although the original films' events are said to have taken place thirty years in the past and "five years after the war", the reunion film appears to be set approximately contemporaneous to its filming.

=== Other parodies ===
Parodies began early: in 1964, only the year after the last book was published, John Lennon in his work In His Own Write had the short story The Famous Five through Woenow Abbey. Amidst a plethora of deliberate misspellings, he lists ten members of the Five, and a dog named Cragesmure.

Viz comic has parodied the series' style of writing and type of stories on a number of occasions.

In the late eighties, Australian comedy team The D-Generation parodied The Famous Five on their breakfast radio show as a five-part serial entitled The Famous Five Get Their Teeth Kicked In. The parody was based on the first book Five on a Treasure Island.

The fourth short story in Fearsome Tales for Fiendish Kids by Jamie Rix is named "The Chipper Chums Go Scrumping", which is about five children in 1952 on a picnic in Kent during the summer holidays. After their nap, the youngest wants an apple to eat so the children decide to steal from a nearby orchard, but they are caught by the owner, who is armed with a shotgun. It was later adapted for the Grizzly Tales for Gruesome Kids cartoon, which aired on CITV in 2000.

A 2005 story in The Guardian also parodies the Famous Five. It argues that Anne, Dick, George and Julian are caricatures rather than characters, portraying Anne as having no life outside of domestic labour. It highlights what the writer, Lucy Mangan, considers to be the power struggle between Dick, George and Julian while Anne is sidelined.

On 31 October 2009, the BBC programme The Impressions Show featured a sketch in which Ross Kemp meets The Famous Five. It was a parody of his Sky One show, Ross Kemp on Gangs.

British comedian John Finnemore did a radio sketch in which Julian and George run into each other as adults and reminisce. It is revealed that Julian has gone on to a career as a smuggler and regularly has to deal with copycat groups of children trying to thwart his plans. George is a happily married mother, Dick has gone to live in a commune in America, and Anne has just been released from prison having murdered a man with a ginger beer bottle.

Bert Fegg's Nasty Book for Boys and Girls features "The Famous Five Go Pillaging", – a short story which parodies the writing style of Enid Blyton; five children witness the collapse of Roman imperialism and their friends and family are slaughtered by 9000 invading Vikings.

The satirical website The Daily Mash reported a lost Blyton manuscript titled "Five Go Deporting Gypsies".

A spoof series of five books written by Bruno Vincent was published in November 2016. The books are titled Five Give Up the Booze, Five Go Gluten Free, Five Go On A Strategy Away Day, Five Go Parenting and Five on Brexit Island. Vincent went on to write several more titles in the series: Five at the Office Christmas Party, Five Get Gran Online, Five Get On the Property Ladder, Five Go Bump in the Night, Five Escape Brexit Island, Five Get Beach Body Ready, Five Lose Dad in the Garden Centre, and Five Forget Mother's Day.

In November 2017, Return to Kirrin was released, written by Neil and Suzy Howlett. Set in 1979, it involves the Five (now middle-aged) reuniting on Kirrin Island, to discuss Julian's plans to develop Kirrin into a theme resort. Julian has become a successful stockbroker, Dick is a well-meaning but inept and overweight policeman, Anne is a worrisome housewife, and George is a feminist community worker (with her flatulent bulldog Gary in tow). Adventures then ensue, involving a host of other original characters.

In May 2026, Saturday Night Live UK parodied the books as a "Gen Z reboot" of the book series.
