= George Soper (illustrator) =

Illustrator and etcher (1870–1942)

- Born: 2 May 1870; South Hornsey, Middlesex
- Died: August 1942 (age 72)
- Education: Ramsgate Boarding School
- Occupations: Illustrator, etcher
- Spouse: Ada Soper
- Children: 2
- Relatives: Eva Lilian Soper (daughter); Eileen Alice Soper (daughter); Ada Soper (wife)

George Soper RE (1870–1942) was an English illustrator and etcher whose work appears in books, magazines and journals, including Alice’s Adventures in Wonderland, The Water Babies, Lamb’s Tales from Shakespeare, Arabian Nights and Grimm’s Fairy Tales. Soper is best known for his images from the late nineteenth century onwards that depict rural life in Britain. He was selected to exhibit at the Royal Academy when just 19, and continued to exhibit there most years for the rest of his life.

== Early life ==
George Soper was born on 2 May 1870 in South Hornsey, Middlesex and attended a boarding school in Ramsgate.

== Career ==
Although Soper had little or no formal training as an artist he began working as an illustrator in Ramsgate, where he became friends with Frank Short, a civil engineer and member of South Kensington School of Art. Short recognised Soper's ability and tutored him from 1902 onwards. Soper quickly developed a reputation as an expert artist and printmaker, and began illustrating for books and magazines. By the 1920s, he had developed a recognisable and varied set of skills covering watercolours, wood cutting, engraving, etching and drypoint and had dedicated his art to capturing the lives of manual workers, including farmers, fisherman and shepherds. He realised that this way of life was slowly disappearing, to be replaced by mechanisation and other technology or trades.

== Personal life and death ==
Soper married Ada in 1897 and the couple moved to Harmer Green, near Welwyn in Hertfordshire where he built a house, later known as Wilding. The couple had two daughters: Eva Lilian, born in 1901 and Eileen Alice, born in 1905.

Eileen was the more famous of the Soper artists. She had been taught by her father, showed flair and talent in etching, and when 15 became the youngest artist ever to exhibit at the Royal Academy.

The elder daughter, Eva, also became an artist, printmaker and modeller and maintained the wildlife sanctuary.

George Soper was elected to the membership of the Royal Society of Painter-Engravers in 1920. and continued working until his death in August 1942.

The work of both George and his daughter are collected by a registered charity, The Soper Collection and is not currently (2021) on display. The charity hopes to buy a site in Suffolk to provide a permanent home for the collection.
