= Five Get into a Fix =

1958 children's novel by Enid Blyton

Five Get Into A Fix
- First edition
- Author: Enid Blyton
- Illustrator: Eileen A. Soper
- Language: English
- Series: The Famous Five series
- Genre: Mystery, Adventure novel
- Publisher: Hodder & Stoughton
- Publication date: 1958
- Publication place: United Kingdom
- Media type: Print (hardcover and paperback)
- Pages: 250
- Preceded by: Five Go to Billycock Hill
- Followed by: Five on Finniston Farm

Five Get into a Fix is a children's novel written by Enid Blyton and published by Hodder and Stoughton in 1958. It is the seventeenth book in the Famous Five series.

== Story ==
Siblings Julian, Dick and Anne are at home with their cousin George and her dog, Timmy. The children are suffering coughs, which results in them being sent to a farm named Magga Glen in the Welsh mountains to recover.

The Five have nearly reached their destination when their driver takes a wrong turn, leading them to a building called Old Towers on a desolate hill. They intend to ask for directions but are deterred by locked gates and a fierce guard dog. They eventually reach Magga Glen and are greeted and fed by the owner, Glenys Jones.

The next morning, the Five meet Mrs Jones's brusque son, Morgan, who is powerfully built. Although he says little, Morgan has a loud voice that he uses to call his seven dogs. When the Five go for a walk, Timmy gets into an altercation with three of the farm dogs and is bitten by one of them. Upset, George promptly resolves to leave the next day. Julian and Dick climb the hills and find the farm's guest chalet. They also encounter the shepherd's young daughter, Aily, with her dog, Dave, and her pet lamb, Fany. George is dissuaded from leaving when the children opt to spend the rest of their holiday in the chalet. They enjoy their first day there, but at night strange rumbling sounds, vibrations and a shimmering light emanate from the hillside. The next day, while out skiing, Julian and George see a woman's face in a window at Old Towers, but the building's caretaker curtly declares that he is the only resident.

Aily befriends the Five and shows them a note, thrown from a window of Old Towers by the elderly owner, Mrs Thomas, stating she is a prisoner and asking for help. Julian and Dick show the note to Morgan, who takes it from them and orders them not to interfere. His attitude causes the children to suspect he is a villain.

Aily takes the Five to a pothole with a tunnel leading to Old Towers. They locate Mrs Thomas, who tells them some evil men murdered her son, Llewellyn, and are exploiting a rare metal beneath the hill in order to make bombs. Back underground, the children spot Morgan and the shepherd and observe the subterranean mining operation. All of them are caught by the gang, who are led by Llewellyn Thomas. Morgan breaks free and calls his dogs, which come to the rescue. Back at the farm, Julian telephones the police. Morgan later returns with the shepherd and says the villains have been jailed. The group then celebrates Morgan's birthday.

== Characters ==
- George (Georgina by rights) – A short-tempered tomboy, often mistaken for a boy.
- Timmy – George's dog.
- Anne – George's younger cousin, a very domesticated girl.
- Julian – Anne and Dick's older brother.
- Dick – Julian and Anne's brother
- Dr. Drew – Doctor who prescribes a holiday in the snow to recover from colds.
- Jenkins – Gardener who is Mrs Jones’s nephew and proposes the Five visit Magga Glen.
- Mrs Jones – Owner of Magga Glen.
- Morgan – Son of Mrs Jones. A large, powerful man with an extremely loud voice.
- Aily – The shepherd's illiterate daughter. Knows the hills well and often plays truant. Speaks broken English and often reverts to Welsh.
- Mrs Thomas – The elderly owner of Old Towers, imprisoned in her own residence.
- Llewellyn – Son of Mrs Thomas and nemesis of Morgan.
- The Shepherd – Aily's father, a kind and gentle man.

== Adaptations ==
The gamebook The Shuddering Mountain Game (1987) was based on this novel.
