= Five Go to Smuggler's Top =

1945 children's novel by Enid Blyton

- Original 1945 first edition cover
- Author: Enid Blyton
- Cover artist: Eileen Alice Soper
- Language: English
- Series: The Famous Five series
- Genre: Mystery, Adventure novel
- Publisher: Hodder & Stoughton
- Publication date: 1945
- Publication place: United Kingdom
- Media type: Print (hardcover and paperback)
- Preceded by: Five Run Away Together (1944)
- Followed by: Five Go Off In A Caravan (1946)

Five Go to Smuggler's Top is the fourth book in the Famous Five series by the British author Enid Blyton.

== Plot summary ==
Siblings Julian, Dick and Anne are spending the Easter school holidays with their cousin George at her parents’ house, Kirrin Cottage.

After a tree falls on the house, the four children are sent to Smuggler's Top, the home of Mr Lenoir, a fellow-scientist of George's father, Uncle Quentin. Smuggler's Top is a queer house at the summit of an old hilltop coastal town, partly surrounded by dangerous marsh. The children are welcomed by Pierre "Sooty" Lenoir (Julian and Dick's schoolmate and Mr Lenoir's stepson) and his half-sister Marybelle.

Mr Lenoir hates dogs, so George's dog Timmy is hidden in a secret passage. One night, the boys spot a light flashing in the house's tower. They suspect the signaller may be Block, the house's sinister, apparently deaf manservant, but he appears to be sleeping in his bedroom at the time. Uncle Quentin comes to stay with them and intends to sell Mr. Lenoir a plan for draining the marsh.

However, Uncle Quentin is kidnapped, along with Sooty, by a local smuggler named Mr Barling, who fears the planned draining of the marsh will bring an end to his smuggling activity. The children find yet another secret underground passage, leading to where Sooty and Uncle Quentin are being held captive by Barling and his henchman, who have been assisted by Block. Timmy attacks the kidnappers, allowing the captives and the children to escape. The police arrive to capture the smugglers. Outside the tunnels, Timmy is almost sucked down into the marsh but is saved by Uncle Quentin, assisted by Julian.
