= Claude Voilier =

French teacher and writer

Claude Voilier (9 November 1917 – 22 May 2009) was a French teacher, journalist, translator (especially of popular English children's series such as The Three Investigators and The Dana Girls into French), and a prolific author, having written over 600 short stories for various French magazines, and about 400 stories for children. In the English-speaking world, she is best known for her continuation of Enid Blyton's The Famous Five series of children's adventure novels.

Claude Voilier was born Andrée Labedan around 1930. She wrote two popular novels for children, Le Manoir des cinq preux and Celle qu'on retrouva. She was living in Arcachon (Gironde), France, at the time of her death in May 2009.

== Voilier's Famous Five series ==
Starting from the early 1970s, and continuing up to the mid-1980s, Voilier wrote a series of books based on Enid Blyton's Famous Five series. The series comprises 24 books, 18 of which have been translated into English by Anthea Bell. Voilier had translated some of the later Blyton Famous Five books into French, and this was a major reason why she was asked to continue the series.

The numbering of the English translations is quite different from the French order. There follows a list of the original French series, with English titles where applicable. The 18 English titles will then be listed in their series order.

== Original French Famous Five series ==
The original French Famous Five series by Claude Voilier was published by Bibliothèque Rose, a division of the giant French publishing house Hachette. Jean Sidobre illustrated the first 12 as well as the penultimate volume. Claude Pascal illustrated a further seven. Buci illustrated Les Cinq contre les fantômes and Anne-Claude Martin illustrated Les Cinq en Amazonie and Les Cinq contre le loup-garou.

In the original hardback editions, the books do not have chapters, and every second page has a comic strip-style illustration that sums up the main action in the text on the opposite page. The comics are one to three panels in length. Most of these illustrations are in black and white, but every so often there is a single-panel full-page colour illustration. However, later paperback editions published in the 1990s dispense with the comics and instead use black-and-white illustrations by Anne Bozellec. These illustrations only appear at intervals rather than on every second page. The paperback editions are also divided into chapters.

A full list of the original French series follows below:

1. Les Cinq sont les plus forts (1971; English title: The Famous Five and the Mystery of the Emeralds)

2. Les Cinq au bal des espions (1971; English title: The Famous Five in Fancy Dress)

3. Le Marquis appelle les Cinq (1972; English title: The Famous Five and the Stately Homes Gang)

4. Les Cinq au Cap des tempêtes (1972; English title: The Famous Five and the Missing Cheetah)

5. Les Cinq à la Télévision (1973; English title: The Famous Five Go on Television)

6. Les Cinq et les pirates du ciel (1973; English title: The Famous Five and the Hijackers)

7. Les Cinq contre le masque noir (1974; English title: The Famous Five Versus the Black Mask)

8. Les Cinq et le galion d'or (1974; English title: The Famous Five and the Golden Galleon)

9. Les Cinq font de la brocante (1975; English title: The Famous Five and the Inca God)

10. Les Cinq se mettent en quatre (1975; English title: The Famous Five and the Pink Pearls)

11. Les Cinq dans la cité secrète (1976; English title: The Famous Five and the Secret of the Caves)

12. La fortune sourit aux Cinq (1976; English title: The Famous Five and the Cavalier's Treasure)

13. Les Cinq et le rayon Z (1977; English title: The Famous Five and the Z-Rays)

14. Les Cinq vendent la peau de l'ours (1977; English title: The Famous Five and the Blue Bear Mystery)

15. Les Cinq aux rendez-vous du diable (1978; English title: The Famous Five in Deadly Danger)

16. Du neuf pour les Cinq (1978; English title: The Famous Five and the Strange Legacy)

17. Les Cinq et le trésor de Roquépine (1979; English title: The Famous Five and the Knights' Treasure)

18. Les Cinq et le diamant bleu (1979; reprinted in 1980 as Les Cinq et le rubis d'Akbar; never translated into English)

19. Les Cinq jouent serré (1980; English title: The Famous Five and the Strange Scientist)

20. Les Cinq en croisière (1980; never translated into English)

21. Les Cinq contre les fantômes (1981; never translated into English)

22. Les Cinq en Amazonie (1983; never translated into English)

23. Les Cinq et le trésor du pirate (1984; never translated into English)

24. Les Cinq contre le loup-garou (1985; never translated into English)

== The series in English ==
18 of the titles were translated into English by Anthea Bell and published in paperback by Knight Books. They were subsequently published again in the early 1990s by Hodder and Stoughton. The Hodder editions have slightly revised titles; instead of e.g. "The Famous Five and the Strange Legacy", the Hodder editions say "The Five and the Strange Legacy" etc., which is closer to the original French.

The formatting is rather different from the French series (at least, from the original hardback versions on which the translations are almost certainly based), in that the translated versions have chapters. The Knight editions also have a number of illustrations that are loosely based on the French style. They are full-page, in black and white and have one or two panels. They are not as ubiquitous as in the French versions however, and are not really in a true comic-strip style. Illustrations were omitted entirely from the Hodder editions.

A complete list of the English titles is given below:

1. The Famous Five and the Stately Homes Gang (first published by Knight Books in 1981; later republished by Hodder and Stoughton in 1993 as The Five and the Stately Homes Gang)

2. The Famous Five and the Mystery of the Emeralds (first published by Knight Books in 1981; later republished by Hodder and Stoughton in 1993 as The Five and the Mystery of the Emeralds)

3. The Famous Five and the Missing Cheetah (first published by Knight Books in 1981; later republished by Hodder and Stoughton in 1993 as The Five and the Missing Cheetah)

4. The Famous Five Go on Television (first published by Knight Books in 1981; later republished by Hodder and Stoughton in 1993 as The Five Go on Television)

5. The Famous Five and the Golden Galleon (first published by Knight Books in 1982; later republished by Hodder and Stoughton in 1993 as The Five and the Golden Galleon)

6. The Famous Five Versus the Black Mask (first published by Knight Books in 1982; later republished by Hodder and Stoughton in 1993 as The Five Versus the Black Mask)

7. The Famous Five in Fancy Dress (first published by Knight Books in 1983; later republished by Hodder and Stoughton in 1993 as The Five in Fancy Dress)

8. The Famous Five and the Blue Bear Mystery (first published by Knight Books in 1983; later republished by Hodder and Stoughton in 1993 as The Five and the Blue Bear Mystery)

9. The Famous Five and the Inca God (first published by Knight Books in 1984; later republished by Hodder and Stoughton in 1993 as The Five and the Inca God)

10. The Famous Five and the Cavalier's Treasure (first published by Knight Books in 1984; later republished by Hodder and Stoughton in 1993 as The Five and the Cavalier's Treasure)

11. The Famous Five and the Strange Legacy (first published by Knight Books in 1984; later republished by Hodder and Stoughton in 1994 as The Five and the Strange Legacy)

12. The Famous Five and the Secret of the Caves (first published by Knight Books in 1984; later republished by Hodder and Stoughton in 1994 as The Five and the Secret of the Caves)

13. The Famous Five and the Hijackers (first published by Knight Books in 1985; later republished by Hodder and Stoughton in 1994 as The Five and the Hijackers)

14. The Famous Five and the Strange Scientist (first published by Knight Books in 1985; later republished by Hodder and Stoughton in 1994 as The Five and the Strange Scientist)

15. The Famous Five in Deadly Danger (first published by Knight Books in 1985; later republished by Hodder and Stoughton in 1994 as The Five in Deadly Danger)

16. The Famous Five and the Knight's Treasure (first published by Knight Books in 1986; later republished by Hodder and Stoughton in 1994 as The Five and the Knight's Treasure)

17. The Famous Five and the Z-Rays (first published by Knight Books in 1986; later republished by Hodder and Stoughton in 1994 as The Five and the Z-Rays)

18. The Famous Five and the Pink Pearls (first published by Knight Books in 1987; later republished by Hodder and Stoughton in 1994 as The Five and the Pink Pearls)

== Possible 25th volume ==
In 1996, a book written by Claude Voilier and illustrated by Anne Bozellec, entitled Les Cinq et le secret du vieux puits (The Five and the Secret of the Old Well), was published and may constitute the 25th volume in the series. However, from the rather scant information available about the book, it appears as though it may be little more than a rewrite or updated translation of Le Club des Cinq et le vieux puits, which is the French version of Five Have a Mystery to Solve, the 20th book in Enid Blyton's original The Famous Five series. So unlike the first 24 volumes of the Voilier series, it is almost certainly not a truly new story and hence should probably be classified as being among the French translations of Blyton's series.

== The Three Investigators connection ==
Claude Voilier has translated some volumes of The Three Investigators series into French. One of the stories in this series, The Mystery of the Silver Spider, is set in the fictitious country of Varania. In The Famous Five and the Strange Scientist, the character of Professor Kolkov comes from Varania, which makes for an interesting little crossover connection between the French Famous Five series and The Three Investigators series.

== Useful links and references ==
- Enid Blyton Society
- Enid Blyton
- French Famous Five series
- Famous Five titles Comprehensive list of the Famous Five titles, including 22 of the 24 titles by Claude Voilier.
