= Five on a Secret Trail =

1956 children's novel by Enid Blyton

- First edition
- Author: Enid Blyton
- Illustrator: Eileen A. Soper
- Language: English
- Series: The Famous Five series
- Genre: Mystery, Adventure novel
- Publisher: Hodder & Stoughton
- Publication date: 1956
- Publication place: United Kingdom
- Media type: Print (hardcover and paperback)
- Preceded by: Five Have Plenty of Fun
- Followed by: Five Go to Billycock Hill

Five on a Secret Trail is the fifteenth novel in the Famous Five series by Enid Blyton. It was first published in 1956.

== Plot ==
George decides to go camping with her dog, Timmy, so he can recover from an injury behind his ear, without being mocked for wearing a large cardboard collar to prevent Timmy from scratching his wound. George is pleased to be joined at the campsite by her cousin Anne, but is disappointed upon learning that Anne's brothers, Julian and Dick, are in France and thus, would not be able to join them.

George and Anne encounter a boy named Guy, the son of a famous archaeologist named Sir John Lawdler, and his small, one-eyed mongrel dog called Jet. The boy is excavating an old Roman camp to search for artefacts and asks the girls not to disturb him. Later that day, the boy's twin brother named Harry (which is later revealed) comes to the area, but the girls mistake him for the first boy, unaware they are dealing with twins. This made the girls confused, as the first boy who was at a different place, would seem to double-up and reach another place, where the girls are. This makes a huge confusion as they think that he is just one crazy, mad boy, who likes to say things and make promises and later to say that he didn't make such promises. Later that night, Anne gets up for a drink from the nearby stream and while trying to return to the camp, she ends up near a derelict, ruined cottage, where she sees lights and hears whispers and footsteps. She gets scared and then takes George and Timmy to the cottage. However, there is no indication of any human activity.

The next day, the girls again encounter the twins separately. The girls then go to George's parents' house for more food supplies and are informed that Julian and Dick will be arriving in a day or two. The following night a storm makes the girls to look for shelter in the old cottage. They are shocked to see people outside during the heavy storm and rain. The girls get scared, and Anne decides to leave the place the next day as she did not want to stay at the old cottage anymore.

Julian and Dick arrive the next day and notice that Anne and George are about to leave. The girls give them their reason for leaving the camp. But then the four children decide to stay in the ruined cottage to see what would happen. That night, while sleeping in the old cottage, they hear weeping and wailing noises and see some kind of light that scares them. The next morning, the four realise that someone was trying to make them leave the old cottage.

Julian and Dick decide to visit the old cottage that night, to find out if there are any suspicious activities going on. They find that a gang of people are trying to find a secret tunnel in which a very precious blueprint was kept. The boys then inform the girls of their findings. Later George finds an entrance to the secret tunnel and they go through a long and tiring tunnel and subsequently discover a leather bag, that felt very light. Later, the five together with Guy, Harry and his dog Jet take the leather bag with them and return to Kirrin Cottage. There, the police officer arrives and opens the bag but finds nothing. However, when the police officer pulls at the lining of the bag, he finds the precious blueprint. Afterwards, uncle Quentin reveals that this blueprint was a secret document with only two copies in the world. Uncle Quentin had one of them and Sir James Lawton-Harrison had the other one, which had been stolen.

The five were supposed to get a reward. Finally, Timmy had started scratching again, which made the wound behind his ear go bad again. This resulted in Timmy having to wear his cardboard collar once more, to his great dismay.
