= Five Go to Mystery Moor =

1954 children's novel by Enid Blyton

- First edition
- Author: Enid Blyton
- Illustrator: Eileen Soper
- Language: English
- Series: The Famous Five series
- Genre: Mystery, Adventure novel
- Publisher: Hodder & Stoughton
- Publication date: 1954
- Publication place: United Kingdom
- Media type: Print (hardcover and paperback)
- Pages: 248
- Preceded by: Five Go Down to the Sea (1953)
- Followed by: Five Have Plenty of Fun(1955)

Five Go to Mystery Moor (published in 1954) is a popular children's book written by Enid Blyton. It is the thirteenth novel in the Famous Five series of books.

== Plot ==
George and her cousin Anne are spending their holiday at Captain Johnson's Riding School, where George has a rivalry with another tomboy named Henrietta, who prefers to be called "Henry". Anne's brothers Julian and Dick come to join the girls and initially mistake Henry for a boy, much to George's chagrin.

The children encounter a group of gypsies determined to visit a desolate place called Mystery Moor. An elderly blacksmith tells the children how gypsies, in the past, sabotaged a railway run by a family of sand miners, causing most of the family to mysteriously disappear when the moor was covered by a thick mist.

The Famous Five follow the gypsies to the moor and discover they are involved in receiving smuggled American banknotes, which are later revealed to be forgeries from France. George and Anne are taken prisoners and held in a cave, but are rescued by Henry and a boy from the riding school, William. A gypsy boy named Sniffer assists their escape, and George promises to reward him with a red bicycle and living in a house with a family.

== Characters ==
1. Julian
2. Dick
3. Anne
4. Georgina ("George")
5. Timmy (George's dog)
6. Henrietta ("Henry")
7. Sniffer
8. Liz (Sniffer's dog)
9. Captain Johnson
10. Mrs. Johnson
11. William
12. The Gypsies (including Sniffer's father)
