= Five Go Down to the Sea =

1953 children's novel by Enid Blyton

Five Go Down To The Sea
- First edition
- Author: Enid Blyton
- Illustrator: Eileen A. Soper
- Language: English
- Series: The Famous Five series
- Genre: Mystery, Adventure novel
- Publisher: Hodder & Stoughton
- Publication date: 1953
- Publication place: United Kingdom
- Media type: Print (hardcover and paperback)
- Preceded by: Five Have a Wonderful Time(1952)
- Followed by: Five Go To Mystery Moor (1954)

Five Go Down To The Sea is the twelfth novel in The Famous Five series by Enid Blyton. It was first published in 1953.

== Plot ==
Siblings Julian, Dick and Anne Kirrin, their cousin Georgina 'George' and her dog, Timmy, spend a holiday at a coastal farm in Cornwall. There, they are nicely welcomed and hosted by the talkative Mrs Penruthlan and her enormous husband, whose monosyllabic utterances they find incomprehensible and quite funny. The children encounter a young boy named Yan (Jan), as well as a group of travelling entertainers called the Barnies.

The children learn that long ago, villainous locals would shine a light on stormy nights to direct ships onto rocks to wreck them, so their cargoes washed ashore and could be stolen. Julian and Dick discover a light is again being shone at night, so the children set out to solve the mystery. They discover the Secret Way, a path used by the old Wreckers and they are locked up in a cellar by some locals after being told they have come at an 'awkward time'. Yan comes and helps the Five escape, as he knew the Secret Way and they go back to Mrs Penruthlan.

The Five and Yan discover that Mr Penruthlan is actually with the police, they all quickly warm to him. Later, after a show by the Barnies and a good meal at the Penruthlans', they discover that the 'Guv'nor' of the Barnies is the exchanger of the goods that the Wreckers stole from the ships. Mr Penruthlan discovers a white package inside Clopper (a funny, pretend horse, that is the highlight of any Barnie show), and after calling the police, he hands Clopper over to Julian and Dick, and wishes them luck with it.

== Characters ==
Main Characters

- George Kirrin
- Anne Kirrin
- Dick Kirrin
- Julian Kirrin
- Timmy (dog)

Other Characters

- Mrs Penruthlan – farmer's wife and host
- Mr Penruthlan – surly farmer
- Yan – a hungry and neglected orphan, who is cared for by his great granddad. He takes a liking to the five, and Anne in particular.
- The Barnies and the Guv'nor (antagonist)

== Adaptations ==
The gamebook The Wreckers’ Tower Game (1983) was based on this novel.

== Other appearances ==
The book is mentioned in the Podcast The Magnus Archives in statement 147 Weaver.
