= Five on a Hike Together =

1951 children's novel by Enid Blyton

Five On A Hike Together
- First edition
- Author: Enid Blyton
- Illustrator: Eileen A. Soper
- Language: English
- Series: The Famous Five series
- Genre: Mystery, Adventure novel
- Publisher: Hodder & Stoughton
- Publication date: 1951
- Publication place: United Kingdom
- Media type: Print (hardcover and paperback)
- Preceded by: Five Fall Into Adventure
- Followed by: Five Have a Wonderful Time

Five on a Hike Together is the tenth novel in the Famous Five series by Enid Blyton. It was first published in 1951.

== Plot ==
Siblings Julian and Dick Kirrin have been given a four-day weekend from their boarding school, coinciding with the mid-term break of their sister Anne and cousin George, so they arrange to go hiking together. Julian plans to spend their first night at a bed and breakfast called Blue Pond Farm. On the way, George's dog, Timmy, injures his leg when being pulled out of a rabbit burrow. Consequently, Julian and George go to the residence of Mr Gaston, a local expert on animals, while Dick and Anne head for the farm. Mr Gaston treats Timmy's injured leg and Mrs Gaston then insists Julian and George stay for a meal, after which they walk to Blue Pond Farm.

Dick and Anne have taken a wrong turn and are confused by ringing bells. They head toward a light, where they encounter an elderly deaf woman. Assuming they have reached Blue Pond Farm, Dick and Anne go in, but the woman, Mrs Taggart, tells them to leave because her son, Dirty Dick, would not accept them. She eventually agrees to let Anne sleep in a loft, whilst Dick makes do with sleeping in a barn.

During the night, Dick is awakened by a voice calling his name. He is given a cryptic message and a piece of paper. The next morning, Mrs Taggart’s son is back and chases Dick away. He and Anne get directions to Blue Pond Farm and are reunited with Julian and George for breakfast, where they tell the story of the message and the bells, which Julian says will signal an escape from the local prison.

The children report the incident to a village policeman, but he accuses them of lying and informs them the escapee has been caught. Julian decides they should hike to a ruined house called Two-Trees, located at Gloomy Water, a marshy lake higher on the moors. That night, Julian deduces that the message is instructions to find stolen goods from a robbery by a prisoner called Nailer and that the loot is hidden in a boat called the Saucy Jane.

The following day, Dirty Dick arrives at Gloomy Water with a woman called Maggie, to search for the loot and are annoyed to see the children there. The Five paddle into the lake on a raft but do not find anything. They conclude that “Tall Stone”, one of the clues written on the paper given to Dick, is a landmark that will help guide them to the location of the Saucy Jane. The next morning, they locate the Saucy Jane at the bottom of the lake, at which point Maggie and Dirty Dick appear in a boat but row back to shore after Julian says the children will be returning to school tomorrow. Julian dives to the bottom of the lake and finds a bag of loot, but cannot remove it. The Five return on the raft near midnight, and Julian and Dick dive to the boat to haul up the loot, which is jewellery stolen from the Queen of Fallonia.

After recovering the jewels, the Five evade Maggie and Dirty Dick and walk to the village of Reebles to call Mr Gaston, who then drives them to a police station, where the children hand over the jewels and tell their story. Maggie and Dirty Dick, stuck in the marshland, are arrested and the police promise to drive the children back to their schools.

== Adaptations ==
- The gamebook The Sinister Lake Game (1984) was based on this novel.
