= Five Go to Billycock Hill =

1957 children's novel by Enid Blyton

- First edition
- Author: Enid Blyton
- Illustrator: Eileen A. Soper
- Language: English
- Series: The Famous Five series
- Genre: Mystery, Adventure novel
- Publisher: Hodder & Stoughton
- Publication date: 1957
- Publication place: United Kingdom
- Media type: Print (hardcover and paperback)
- Preceded by: Five on a Secret Trail
- Followed by: Five Get Into A Fix

Five Go to Billycock Hill is the sixteenth novel in the Famous Five series by Enid Blyton. It was first published in 1957.

== Plot ==
The Five are camping on Billycock Hill, near the farm of Toby, a boy who loves jokes and pranks. When Toby's cousin Jeff, a Royal Air Force pilot, and Jeff’s friend Ray are reported to have defected and stolen the newest aeroplanes, the Five and Toby are shocked. The media later reports that Jeff and Ray crashed their planes and drowned at sea. Toby refuses to believe that Jeff was a spy, as he had always seemed a trustworthy man.

The Five attempt to comfort the distraught Toby. Later that day, Toby's younger brother Benny's pet piglet, Curly, appears with a message that leads the children to find Jeff and Ray imprisoned in Billycock Caves, who they rescue.

== Characters ==
- Julian – oldest of the Five
- Dick – brother to Julian
- Georgina (George) – cousin of Julian, Dick and Anne. She is a tomboy
- Anne – younger sister of Julian and Dick
- Timmy – George's faithful dog
- Toby – an amusing boy from Julian’s and Dick’s school
- Mrs Thomas – Toby’s mother, a kind and hard working farmer’s wife
- Mr Thomas – farmer and dad to Toby
- Benny – Toby’s younger brother, a funny little boy who says "runned" instead of "ran"
- Curly – a funny, curious pig belonging to Benny
- Jeff – Toby’s cousin, a pilot, of whom Toby is proud and brags about
- Ray – another pilot who also vanishes
- Mr Gringle – the strange and absent-minded owner of the Butterfly Farm
- Mr Brent – business partner of Mr Gringle
- Will Janes – a criminal who lives at the Butterfly Farm. He used to do odd jobs before he made friends with the wrong folk
- Mrs Janes – a poor witch-like woman who was always under attack by her son Will Janes

== Adaptations ==
The gamebook The Secret Airfield Game (1986) was based on this novel.
