= Five Go to Demon's Rocks =

1961 children's novel by Enid Blyton

- First edition
- Author: Enid Blyton
- Illustrator: Eileen A. Soper
- Language: English
- Series: The Famous Five series
- Genre: Mystery, Adventure novel
- Publisher: Hodder & Stoughton
- Publication date: 1961
- Publication place: United Kingdom
- Media type: Print (hardcover and paperback)
- Preceded by: Five on Finniston Farm
- Followed by: Five Have a Mystery to Solve
- Text: Five Go to Demon's Rocks online

Five Go to Demon's Rocks is the nineteenth novel in The Famous Five series by Enid Blyton. It was first published in 1961.

== Plot ==
Irascible scientist Quentin Kirrin informs his wife, Fanny, that his colleague, Professor Hayling, will be arriving a week early for a stay at Kirrin Cottage. The professor is accompanied by his son, Tinker, who often has a sudden urge to start imitating vehicular noises and has brought his pet monkey, Mischief. It is also described that Tinker imitates such noises when he is upset or when someone had been 'horrid' to him. Also arriving are Quentin and Fanny's daughter, George, and her cousins, Julian, Dick and Anne, and George's dog, Timmy. The ensuing crowded and noisy household upsets the two scientists, prompting Tinker to propose that the children spend their holiday at his abandoned lighthouse at Demon's Rocks, located 10 miles away.

After settling in at the lighthouse, the children meet an elderly retired sailor, Jeremiah Boogle, who tells them of his youthful encounters with three villains who lured ships to Demon's Rocks and plundered the wrecks. He says the ringleader, One-Ear Bill, hid a treasure trove which has never been found. Two of One-Ear Bill's descendants, Jacob and Ebenezer, now show tourists through the wreckers' cave. Jacob burgles some items from the lighthouse and also steals the key. When the children visit the cave, Mischief discovers a gold coin. Later, Ebenezer and Jacob lock the children in the lighthouse to prevent them from returning to the cave to hunt for the treasure, but Julian and Dick enter the cave network via a tunnel and discover the treasure. Unable to reach the mainland because of the rising tide, they return to the lighthouse, light its lamp and ring an old warning bell amid a fierce gale to alert the villagers to their fate. Jacob and Ebenezer flee, and the children are rescued the next morning. Julian and Dick declare they will recover the treasure for the police and then the children will return to Kirrin Cottage.

== Adaptations ==
The gamebook The Wailing Lighthouse Game (1985) was based on this novel.
