= Five Get into Trouble (film) =

1970 Danish-German film directed by Trine Hedman

Five Get into Trouble De fem i fedtefadet
- Based on: Five Get into Trouble by Enid Blyton
- Release date: 1970
- Country: Denmark
- Language: Danish

Five Get into Trouble (Danish: De fem i fedtefadet; German: 5 Freunde in der Tinte) is a 1970 Danish-German film directed by Katrine Hedman based on Enid Blyton's 1949 novel Five Get into Trouble.

== Cast ==
- Lone Thielke: Georg (Georgina)
- Mads Rahbek: Julius
- Niels Kibenich: Richard
- Sanne Knudsen: Anne
- Ove Sprogøe: Uncle Quentin
- Astrid Villaume: Aunt Fanny
- Lily Broberg: Servant Johanna
- Kristian Paaschburg: Richard Kent
- Manfred Reddemann: Perton
- Werner Abrolat: Johnny
- Hubert Mittendorf: Max
- Frank Nossack: Rooky
- Jørn Walsøe Therkelsen: Weston
- Marie Brink: Aggie
- Børge Hilbert: Kaufmann
- Ruth Maisie: Lady at the shop
- Christian Hansen: Policeman
- Max Gårdsted: Police officer
- Ragnhild Jørgensen: Richard's mother
- Poul Rahbek: Richard's father
- Willy Flink: Man at petrol station
