= Five Fall into Adventure =

1950 children's novel by Enid Blyton

Five Fall Into Adventure
- First edition
- Author: Enid Blyton
- Illustrator: Eileen A. Soper
- Language: English
- Series: The Famous Five series
- Genre: Mystery, Adventure novel
- Publisher: Hodder & Stoughton
- Publication date: 1950
- Publication place: United Kingdom
- Media type: Print (paperback)
- Preceded by: Five Get Into Trouble
- Followed by: Five on a Hike Together

Five Fall Into Adventure is the ninth novel in The Famous Five series by Enid Blyton. It was first published in 1950.

== Summary ==
The Famous Five meet up at Kirrin Station and learn Aunt Fanny and Uncle Quentin will be holidaying in Spain, leaving the Five at home with the household's cook, Joanna. On the beach, the Five meet a gypsy girl, the "ragamuffin", called Jo. Jo and George almost get into fight and Dick who intervenes, gets a punch from Jo and Dick hits Jo. The others find Jo and George very much alike. After finding out that Jo is a girl, Dick is very sorry, which moves Jo who is not used to kindness. After this Jo is devoted to Dick, but Jo and George dislike each other. After the house is burgled, George is kidnapped, and Jo comes with a card requesting some documents to exchange for George. The wrong papers are provided, so George is not released. Jo is helping the villains, but decides to change sides, mostly because she wants to please Dick, and tells that George is likely hidden in Raven's forest by the villains among them her father Simmy. The children find Simmy's caravan, but no George or Timmy in it. Instead, they found George's writing on the wall of the caravan which says "Red Tower, Red Tower" over and over again. Jo knows that Red Tower is a man, a dangerous fellow who lives in a castle-like house on a cliff-top. Jo eventually leads Julian and Dick to a cliff-top house, where George is captive in a tower. Anne is left home with Joanna. In the foot of the cliff, children find an underground tunnel which leads to the house. In the tunnel they meet Red Tower, a giant of a man with flaming-red beard and with mad-man's eyes. Red captures Dick and Julian, but not Jo who escapes. Jo frees the boys from captivity and climbs up some ivy and swaps places with George. Jo later locks up three of the kidnappers, including her own father. Timmy is doped, but wakes up just in time to protect them from the villains. She and Julian, George, Dick and Timmy the dog manage to make a getaway by boat. The police are alerted. Three of the criminals attempt to escape but their helicopter crashes. Jo is admired by everyone, even by George, who first hated her. Joanna says that her cousin would like to look after Jo, as Jo's father will be sent to prison.

== Adaptation ==
The novel was adapted as a 2014 German film production, Famous Five 3.
