= Five on a Treasure Island =

1942 children's novel by Enid Blyton

- First edition
- Author: Enid Blyton
- Illustrator: Eileen A. Soper
- Language: English
- Series: The Famous Five series
- Genre: Mystery, Adventure novel
- Publisher: Hodder & Stoughton
- Publication date: 11 September 1942
- Publication place: United Kingdom
- Media type: Print (hardcover and paperback)
- Followed by: Five Go Adventuring Again (1943)

Five on a Treasure Island (published in 1942) is a popular children's book by Enid Blyton. It is the first book in The Famous Five series. The first edition of the book was illustrated by Eileen Soper.

== Background ==
It has been suggested that the book was influenced by L. T. Meade's 1892 book Four on an Island, which also recounts a story of four related children including a tomboy along with a dog living on a private island with a shipwreck.

== Plot ==
When siblings Julian, Dick and Anne cannot go for their usual summer holiday to Polzeath, they are invited to spend the summer with their Aunt Fanny and Uncle Quentin at their home Kirrin Cottage, in the coastal village of Kirrin. They also meet their cousin Georgina, a surly, difficult girl, who tries hard to live like a boy and only answers to the name George. Despite an uncomfortable start, the cousins become friends and George introduces them to her beloved dog Timothy (Timmy), who secretly lives with a fisher boy called James in the village, as George's parents will not allow her to keep a dog.

On their way to Kirrin Island, George shows her cousins a shipwreck, explaining it was her great-great-great-grandfather's ship. He had been transporting gold when the ship was wrecked in a storm, but despite divers investigating the wreck, the gold was never found. After visiting the wreck, the five arrive on the Island and are exploring the ruined castle when a huge storm blows up, making it too dangerous for them to return to the mainland. While they take shelter on the island, the sea throws up the old shipwreck, grounding it on the rocks surrounding the island. Excited by these developments, they decide to come back at dawn the next day to investigate the wreck before it is discovered.

The following day, the five visit the wreck and discover the captain's cabin, where they find some objects belonging to George's old relative, including a box which they take back to Kirrin Cottage. Uncle Quentin confiscates the box, but Julian sneaks into his uncle's study and takes it back, finding it contains an old map of Kirrin Castle. On further investigation of the map, the children find the word INGOTS, which they later realise marks where the lost gold was buried. After making a tracing of the map and returning the box, they decide to find the gold themselves.

To the children's shock, the box containing the map is sold to an antique collector. The same man also makes an offer to buy Kirrin Island. The children realize he has unearthed the secret map and wants the gold for himself, so they hatch a plan to get to the gold first. Thinking the children want to spend time at the island before it is sold, Uncle Quentin and Aunt Fanny allow them to go camping there for one week.

Arriving on the island, the five start searching the castle ruins to locate the old dungeons where the gold is hidden. Chasing a rabbit, Timmy falls down an old well, from where the children find the dungeon entrance. Exploring underground, they find the gold in a locked vault, however trouble soon arrives, as some men arrive hoping to steal the gold. They capture George and Julian, lock them in the dungeons and tell them to write a note to Anne and Dick that will lure them down into the dungeons. George writes the letter but Dick realises something is amiss, as George has signed her name "Georgina", so he and Anne remain on the surface. Unable to find them, the men leave the island, taking the oars from the children's boat so they cannot escape. Dick and Anne use the well shaft to rescue Julian and George from the dungeon, and the children devise a plan to trap the men when they come back to the island with a boat to steal the gold.

Although the plan goes wrong, the children manage to leave the men stranded on Kirrin Island. They return to the mainland to tell Uncle Quentin, Aunt Fanny and the police what has happened. The gold is recovered, and it is determined that it legally belongs to George's family, making them rich and enabling them to afford everything they have ever wanted. George's only wish is to be allowed to keep Timmy, which her parents allow. George also agrees to go to boarding school with Anne, because she and her cousins have become very good friends and also the school allowed pets.

== Film adaptations ==
An 8-part Children's Film Foundation film serial was produced in 1957, directed by Gerald Landau.

In early 2010, rumours appeared that there might be a Five on a Treasure Island film to be released in 2012. On 31 May those rumours were confirmed by film maker Sam Mendes on an interview about the upcoming Skyfall. Mendes stated, "A script is under way and is hoped to be in cinemas Spring 2012." Progress on the film was stopped when MGM went bankrupt later in the year.

== Miscellaneous ==
- Five on a Treasure Island was first published in the US in 1950. Five more titles in the series would follow in Blyton's lifetime: books 2, 3, 4, 12 and 13.
- In 1992, Fabbri published Five on a Treasure Island as No.50.
