= Eileen Soper =

English etcher and illustrator

Eileen Alice Soper (26 March 1905 – 18 March 1990) was an English etcher and illustrator of children's and wildlife books. She produced a series of etchings, mainly of children playing, and illustrated books for other writers, notably for Enid Blyton and Elizabeth Gould. She also wrote and illustrated her own children's books. Some of her illustrations of children and animals were used in a china series for children by Paragon China in the 1930s. Later in life she concentrated on writing and illustrating wildlife books. She was a founder member of the Society of Wildlife Artists (SWLA) and was elected a member of the Royal Society of Miniature Painters, Sculptors and Gravers (RMS) in 1972.

== Early years ==
Eileen Soper was born in 1905 in the Municipal Borough of Enfield and moved to the house where she was to spend the rest of her life in Harmer Green, Welwyn in the Hertfordshire countryside in 1908. The house she later named "Wildings" was built by her father, the artist George Soper (illustrator) . Eileen and her older sister, the artist Eva, inherited the house after his death in 1942 and lived there for the rest of their lives. She attended Hitchin Girls School and was artistically trained mostly by her father.

== Achievements ==
Soper showed early promise as an artist, and two of her etchings were shown in the Royal Academy in London at the age of 15 after she showed three prints at an exhibition organised by the International Society of Printmakers in California. She continued to produce around 180 etchings, mostly of children at play, into the early 1930s. Queen Mary bought two of her etchings, among them Flying Swings in 1924. Her work was popular and well received and shown in the UK and the US.

Today Soper is best known for her collaboration with Enid Blyton, most notably all of the Famous Five books.

Soper also published her own children's books in the 1940s, as well as a book of poetry. From the 1950s on, she worked mostly on her wildlife illustrations of British wildlife around her house in Welwyn.

== Later years ==
Soper and her sister Eva lived in Wildings until they fell ill at similar times, both dying in 1990.

== Bibliography ==
=== Published books (author) ===
==== Children's books ====
- Happy Rabbit (1947)
- Dormouse awake (1948)
- Sail away, shrew (1949)

==== Wildlife books ====
- When badgers wake (1955)
- Wild encounters (1957)
- Wanderers of the field (1959)
- Wild Favours (1963)
- Muntjac (1969)

==== Poetry ====
- Songs on the wind (1948)

=== Published books (illustrator) ===
- Famous Five Series (Enid Blyton, 1942–1963)
- Drabble, Phil (1979). No badgers in my wood. London: Joseph. ISBN 0718118537.
- The Golden Years (Christine Chaundler), 1950, publisher Robert Hale Ltd (London)
- Six in a Caravan, Bridget Mackenzie, 1945, publisher George Newness Ltd.
