= The Valley of Adventure =

1947 children's book by Enid Blyton

- First edition
- Author: Enid Blyton
- Illustrator: Stuart Tresilian
- Language: English
- Series: The Adventure Series
- Genre: Adventure novel
- Publisher: Macmillan
- Publication date: 1947
- Publication place: United Kingdom
- Media type: Print (hardcover and paperback)
- Preceded by: The Castle of Adventure (1946)
- Followed by: The Sea of Adventure (1947)

The Valley of Adventure (published in 1947) is a popular children's book by Enid Blyton. It is the third book in the Adventure Series. The first edition of the book was illustrated by Stuart Tresilian. It is one of the few novels by Enid Blyton with a Second World War theme.

== Summary ==
When Bill gets a new plane, the children (Phillip, Dinah, Jack and Lucy-Anne) are allowed to go on a night flight to the countryside to spend a short holiday studying nature. But the children accidentally board the wrong plane, and find themselves being taken away by two men, Juan and Pepi.

After landing, the foursome escape from the plane, only to find themselves in an isolated valley scarred by war somewhere on the European mainland, and hide in a cave behind a waterfall, hidden in vines. Meanwhile Jack discovers a prisoner named Otto who gives him a mysterious map that leads to a treasure, hidden somewhere in the valley. The children after many days of scrambling and climbing rocks, discover a cave with priceless statues taken throughout the country during the war. The children discover the statues were taken from various churches at the time, in order to be hidden from the Nazis.

== Historical references ==
The Second World War is mentioned a few times in the novel. The treasure, found in the cave in the novel are later revealed to be statues taken from churches throughout Austria and hidden in the cave for safety from the Nazis. The Germans are described as 'the enemy' throughout the book, and it is not revealed that they are the Nazis until the second last chapter.

Despite what many readers think, The Valley of Adventure is not the only semi historical novel by Enid Blyton. Novels such as The Adventurous Four and The Children of Kiddilan also have elements of the Second World War.
