= The Mystery of Tally-Ho Cottage =

Novel by Enid Blyton

- 1975 edition
- Author: Enid Blyton
- Illustrator: Treyer Evans
- Language: English
- Series: The Five Find-Outers
- Genre: Children's novel
- Publisher: Methuen
- Publication date: 1954
- Publication place: United Kingdom
- Preceded by: The Mystery of Holly Lane
- Followed by: The Mystery of the Missing Man

The Mystery of Tally-Ho Cottage is a 1954 children's mystery novel written by Enid Blyton and illustrated by Treyer Evans. It is the twelfth book in the Five Find-Outers series.

== Plot ==
The mystery begins when the newspapers report that a valuable picture has been stolen from an art gallery. The police know the identity of the thieves—the Lorenzos of Tally-Ho Cottage. The Lorenzos eluded capture, but had to leave their poodle, Poppet, at the cottage. They had engaged an elderly couple, the Larkins, to take care of it, but they had wanted to take their poodle with them.

Ern, who was living near Tally-Ho Cottage, kept a watch on the grounds to see when the Lorenzos would return. He heard noises in the night but slept through, informing the Find-Outers about the noises in the morning, which he thought were like an airplane, car or motorboat. Upon investigation, the Find-Outers find that the Lorenzos did indeed arrive in a motorboat and that the Larkins left when they arrived and the Lorenzos disguised themselves as the Larkins. The Lorenzos are arrested and the stolen artwork is found stitched inside Poppet the poodle's rug.

== Characters ==
- Fatty (Frederick) – The chief of the Five Find-Outers
- Daisy – A member of the Five Find-Outers
- Bets – The youngest member of the Five Find-Outers
- Larry – The former chief of the Five Find-Outers
- Pip – A member of the Five Find-Outers
- Buster – A dog owned by Fatty.
- Mr. Goon – The local Peterswood policeman.
- Superintendent Jenks – A friend of the Five Find-Outers
- Mr Lorenzo - One of the culprits
- Mrs Lorenzo - One of the culprits
- Mr Larkins - The Housekeeper
- Mrs Larkins - The Housekeeper's Wife
- Poppet - The dog of The Lorenzos
- PC Johns - A Constable With Mr Goon

== Critical reception ==
A. P. L. of the Shipley Times and Express praised the book, writing, "Besides mystery, there is a strong and continuous element of fun in the story contributed largely by the steadily plodding Ern and the irrepressible Fatty. A healthy and enjoyable story." The Morpeth Herald said, "Two runaways, a stolen picture, a little white poodle, and the Five Find-Outers and Dog on the job; these are the ingredients of this splendid yarn. In addition to a first-class mystery, there is also plenty of fun and hilarity." Writing for Enid Blyton Society, Robert Houghton called the book a "fine tale, involving a stolen painting and its whereabouts".

Greg Sheridan of The Australian said that a "distinct joy of literature" is when the reader surprisingly recognises themselves in a character. As an eight- or nine-year-old child, he was going over The Mystery of Tally-Ho Cottage and found himself in the boy Frederick Algernon Trotterville (FAT) who gets nicknamed Fatty. Fatty is arrogant and overweight, gluttonous and loquacious, so the other children initially disapprove of him. Sheridan wrote, "Even as a child, my natural shape resembled a potato. The idea that a smart-talking fatty could be a hero was terrifically appealing, perhaps the basis of the rest of my life." He continued, "Body-shaming, hate speech, stereotyping – every offence a children’s book could commit. And yet it’s also marvellously plotted and absorbing to read even today."

== Legacy ==
The book's original manuscript was put up for auction by Hartleys Auctioneers in Ilkley in September 2010 and had an estimated value of between £300 and £500. It had been in Blyton's daughter Gillian Baverstock's estate. The manuscript included Blyton's handwritten statement that she typed her stories "straight out of my head" rather than penning them via hand.
