= The Castle of Adventure =

1946 children's book by Enid Blyton

- First edition
- Author: Enid Blyton
- Illustrator: Stuart Tresilian
- Language: English
- Series: The Adventure Series
- Genre: Adventure novel
- Publisher: Macmillan
- Publication date: 1946
- Publication place: United Kingdom
- Media type: Print (hardcover and paperback)
- Preceded by: The Island of Adventure (1944)
- Followed by: The Valley of Adventure (1947)

The Castle of Adventure (published in 1946) is a popular children's book by Enid Blyton. It is the second book in The Adventure Series. The first edition of the book was illustrated by Stuart Tresilian.

== Plot summary ==
Jack, Lucy-Ann, Dinah and Philip attempt to figure out what is behind the strange goings-on at a ruined castle near Spring Cottage in Scotland where they are on holiday with Dinah and Philip's mother, Aunt Allie. The four youngsters make friends with Tassie, a mysterious gypsy living in the woods with her mother. Along with Bill Cunningham, who appears later in the book, the children manage to expose a ring of spies led by the threatening Scar-Neck who are working against the UK Military service.

== Television serial ==
The Castle of Adventure was a children's live-action serial based on the book by Enid Blyton. It ran for 8 half-hour episodes from 19 April – 7 June 1990, produced by TVS Films and shown on CITV. The star-studded cast included Susan George, Gareth Hunt and Brian Blessed. The children were played by Rosie Marcel, Richard Hanson, Hugo Guthrie, Bethany Greenwood and Eileen Hawkes. Lionel Augustus and Edward Francis (who was the producer of all episodes) were the writers. Terry Marcel, Rosie's father was the director. The plot of the series closely followed that of the novel, but the setting was updated to the time of its production. The series was filmed on location and at Saltwood Castle in Saltwood, Kent.

The names of the children are Philip and Dinah Mannering who are brother and sister, Lucy-Ann and Jack Trent, also brother and sister. During the holidays, they live with Philip and Dinah's mother, Allie at Spring Cottage which she borrowed from her friend (no longer set in Scotland as in the original novel). In episode 2, the four youngsters make friends with Tassie, a mysterious gypsy living in the woods with her mother, who is threatened by Sam, nicknamed Scar. Towards the series’ end, Aunt Jane visits the children, as well as Bill Cunningham, whom Allie met during the convention at the Military service in the opening episode.

Terrestrial repeats of the series were unknown once it was aired. However, a year later, a video was released, although some scenes were edited out, and it aired on The Children's Channel after TVS had lost its ITV franchise. Along with TVS' other programmes, it has been kept off the DVD market for complicated legal reasons, but is available on YouTube.

Edward Francis told The Guardian at the time of its broadcast that "Dinah takes the initiative far more. She confronts and debates things in a modern way. And there is more parity in the children's relationship with their widowed mother than in the original; she's less formal and disciplinarian". Three years later, commenting on the updates which had seen an anti-tank device and the SAS included in the storyline, Anna Home (former head of children's programmes at the BBC who had been at TVS earlier in the 1980s) mentioned that Blyton "suffer(ed) from being neither truly period nor modern; it is difficult for writers and actors to know whether to retain the language and accent of the period or try to update it", and suggested that the dramatisation had not been "particularly successful".
