= Enid Blyton's illustrators =

The children's books of Enid Blyton were illustrated by a large number of artists, ranging from figures known for other work to humbler commercial artists, who in some cases were anonymous. Since the Blyton texts mainly used very simple language, the work of the illustrators was an important part of the appeal of many of the works.

The single most important artist, in terms of Blyton's association in the public mind, was Dutch. Eelco Martinus ten Harmsen van der Beek (1897–1953), creator in the 1930s of the Flipje character, and usually known as van der Beek or just Beek. He was already well known in the Netherlands when he approached London publishers Sampson Low at the end of the 1940s.

The result was the creation of the Noddy series for young children, still a major property for animators half a century later. The conscious intention to create a Disney-style sympathetic focus character — a European Mickey Mouse — was reportedly a major factor. Beek's death in 1953 was no obstacle to the further progress of the several series of Noddy books. Peter Wienk worked alongside Beek on the Noddy books and from 1953-1970 Wienk did many illustrations for the Noddy books and Noddy Big books. There was yet another Dutch illustrator who worked on some of Blyton's other books, Willy Schermelé.

Eileen Soper (1905–1990) illustrated around 50 Blyton books, including the whole Famous Five series. In the 1970s her illustrations for the Famous Five books were replaced with more contemporary ones by Betty Maxey.

Dorothy M. Wheeler (1891–1966) was the English artist who illustrated the original editions of five entire series: "The Magic Faraway Tree" series, the "Josie Click and Bun" series, the "Mr Pink-Whistle" series, the "Mr Tumpy" series (in strip book form) and the "O'Clock Tales" short story compilations. She also illustrated "Bumpy and His Bus" and "The Little Tree House".

Johan Groenveld (1924–2011) illustrated the Dutch version of The Castle of Adventure (1946). He is known in The Netherlands and abroad as an illustrator, cartoonist and cartographer.

Betty Ladler (1914–2004) provided illustrations for Third Holiday Book (1948), Tenth Holiday Book (1955), Eleventh Holiday Book (1956) and Enid Blyton's Magazine (1955).

Kathleen I. Nixon (1894–1988) provided illustrations for numerous stories by Enid Blyton. The interior illustrations of The Enid Blyton Book of Bunnies ( 1925 ) published by Newnes is attributed to her.

Pierre Probst (1913–2007) was a French artist who collaborated intensely with Blyton for a few years in the 1950s, on a series of books for Collins. He is known in France for other creations.

Benjamin Rabier (1864–1939), one of the patriarchs of the French comic book and creator of La vache qui rit, worked on the 1936 title The Famous Jimmy.

Alfred Burgess Sharrocks (1919–1988), a British artist and illustrator; and a noted ornithologist.

Raymond Sheppard (1913–1958) was a British artist who illustrated the two books The Adventures of Pip and More Adventures of Pip (both 1948).
