= The Adventure Series =

Series of books by Enid Blyton

- Book 1 of the series
- The Island of Adventure; The Castle of Adventure; The Valley of Adventure; The Sea of Adventure; The Mountain of Adventure; The Ship of Adventure; The Circus of Adventure; The River of Adventure
- Author: Enid Blyton
- Illustrator: Stuart Tresilian
- Cover artist: Stuart Tresilian
- Country: United Kingdom
- Language: English
- Genre: Children's literature, mystery
- Published: 1944–1955
- No. of books: 8

The Adventure Series is a series of eight children's novels by the English writer Enid Blyton. The stories feature four children - Phillip, Jack, Dinah, and Lucy-Ann, and Jack's pet parrot Kiki - solving mysteries, often without adult assistance.

Although the publication dates span a decade, Blyton reportedly wrote each of the novels in less than a week.

== Characters ==
(family names are provided based on first appearances)

- Philip Mannering: A boy with a growth of hair which stands up above the forehead, earning him (as well as his sister and mother) the nickname "Tufty" from Jack. Like his late father, Philip has a gift of befriending any type of land-based animal he comes across, and always has a veritable zoo of small animals somewhere within his clothes. He teases Dinah about her squeamishness, often resulting in fights between them. He is Jack's best friend and is kind to Lucy-Ann, particularly when Dinah is unkind to her.
- Jack Trent: A boy about Philip's age, who has red hair, green eyes and many freckles on his face, the latter of which earning him the nickname "Freckles" from Philip. He and his sister Lucy-Ann are orphans and used to live with an unfriendly uncle until they are adopted by Mrs. Mannering. Jack has a special passion for birds, and spends most of his time observing them. His greatest dream is becoming an ornithologist. He loves Mrs. Mannering very much and cares greatly about his sister Lucy-Ann. Following his first adventure, Jack nearly always carries a rope and his field glasses, among other things, as basic equipment.
- Dinah Mannering: Philip's younger sister of about twelve at the beginning of the series. Like her brother, she has a tuft of hair standing up atop her head, but she shares neither his gift in attracting, nor his love for, animals, especially the small creeping types such as mice, insects, and snakes. Temperamental as she is, she often finds herself the target of her brother's teasing, but otherwise she is quite level-headed, intelligent and grown-up for her age.
- Lucy-Ann Trent: Jack's little sister is the youngest of the foursome - around 11 at the start of the series - and also the most timid one. Like her brother, she has red hair, green eyes and freckles, and in several instances she is described as very pretty. Lucy-Ann is very affectionate towards the people she loves, particularly her brother Jack, though sometimes she is a little jealous that Jack seems to love birds more than her. She also loves her adopted "parents" Bill and Mrs. Mannering very much, is Dinah's best friend, and quite fond of Philip.
- Kiki: Jack's female pet parrot, physically described as a cockatoo with a crest on her head. (Note: Kiki's actual description varies greatly, depending on the media used in the Adventure Series. The text in the original Island of Adventure edition describes her as "scarlet and grey", akin to a gang-gang cockatoo (albeit a male one, whereas Kiki is female), while Kiki's original illustration by Stuart Tresilian in the same book rather resembles a pink cockatoo with its characteristic striped crest. The 90's TV series and the revised book editions by Macmillan and Piper instead make use of either a yellow-crested or sulphur-crested cockatoo, with white plumage and a yellow crest.) Her most noticeable trait is her enormous repertoire of command phrases and peculiar noises, which she seems to pick up very easily. Her commands originally came from Jack and Lucy-Ann's unfriendly uncle and his stern caretaker, with whom they had to live until Jack and Lucy-Ann were adopted by Mrs Mannering. In the stories Kiki serves usually either as comic relief or as a saviour from tight situations, as her voice is sometimes mistaken for a real person.
- Bill Cunningham: An important member (holding the rank of inspector) of an unspecified secret service force (possibly based upon the British Secret Intelligence Service). His most prominent bodily feature is his half-bald head. He meets the children upon their very first adventure and makes regular appearances in the series from that point on. The children's adventures are frequently connected with Bill's work, and they often solve mysteries for him. Throughout the series, he is shown to be fond of the children. Following the events in The Ship of Adventure, Bill marries Mrs. Mannering and adopts all the children as his own. The children call him Bill Smugs due to the fact that he introduced himself under that alias on their first adventure.
- Mrs. Alison Mannering (later Cunningham, aka "Aunt Allie"): Philip and Dinah's mother is a widow (not much is revealed about her late husband, only that he seems to have possessed the same animal-charming ability Philip demonstrates throughout the series), and like her children she has a tuft of hair upon the top of her head. At first she adopts Jack and Lucy-Ann into her family, providing them a loving home; later she marries their common friend Bill and finds a new family with all of them. She is affectionately called "Aunt Allie" by Jack and especially by Lucy-Ann.

== Novels ==
The Sea of Adventure (1948). Armada 1969 paperback edition. 190 pages

- The Island of Adventure (1944) AKA Mystery Island (US, 1945)
- The Castle of Adventure (1946)
- The Valley of Adventure (1947)
- The Sea of Adventure (1948)
- The Mountain of Adventure (1949)
- The Ship of Adventure (1950)

Originally, the series was supposed to end after this episode, but following fan demand, Blyton wrote two more episodes:

- The Circus of Adventure (1952)
- The River of Adventure (1955)

All of the books are in print, and the original editions are expensive collector's items.

TV versions of all eight novels were produced by Cloud 9 Entertainment Studios in 1996. The Castle of Adventure was earlier dramatised by TVS for ITV in 1990, and the series has been Blyton's most used on the BBC; in 1974 The Island of Adventure was told on Jackanory while in 1986 The Circus of Adventure followed. These were the only Blyton stories ever to be told on Jackanory. In 1988, The Castle of Adventure was adapted as part of the Radio 4 children's programme Cat's Whiskers, while in 1993, The Island of Adventure was read on the old Radio 5.

== Plot summaries ==
=== The Island of Adventure ===
Philip meets Jack and Lucy-Ann and Jack's pet bird Kiki, and after they sneak home with him, they move in with Philip, his sister Dinah and their Aunt Polly and Uncle Jocelyn at an ancient mansion at the coast. Strange lights on the nearby mysterious island leads to the four's first adventure inside an abandoned copper mine and a network of secret undersea tunnels.

=== The Castle of Adventure ===
Philip and Dinah's mother takes the four on a summer adventure to a valley in the countryside overlooked by an ominous abandoned castle. When the four go looking for eagles, they find that the castle isn't as abandoned as they were led to believe. They investigate and get caught up in an encounter with a gang of dangerous spies.

=== The Valley of Adventure ===
When Bill buys a plane, he decides to take the four children for a holiday, but events at the airport lead to the four getting into the wrong plane. When the plane lands they find themselves in an unfamiliar valley scarred by war and, once again, the four children fall into an adventure involving a lost treasure sought by a band of villains.

=== The Sea of Adventure ===
Bill takes the foursome on a trip to a Scottish island to help them recover from measles. But amongst the islands, they stumble upon a sinister plot; Bill disappears, and the children are left alone to find out where he is, what is going on and how they will escape.

=== The Mountain of Adventure ===
Hoping for a quiet holiday for once, the children, Kiki, Mrs. Mannering and Bill go to a mountain farm in Wales for some wandering. But on the search for the Vale of Butterflies, the children get lost and find themselves near a mysterious mountain. Ominous rumblings from the ground, a pack of wolves roaming the area, a black fugitive, and Philip's disappearance are but a few of the mysteries the children have to unravel about the mountain. This is one of few novels by Enid Blyton to have science fiction elements.

=== The Ship of Adventure ===
All the children are aboard for a quiet cruise among the Greek islands. But when Micky, Philip's new monkey, breaks his birthday present, all the children embark on a quest to find the lost treasure of the Andra and evade the villains responsible.

=== The Circus of Adventure ===
Who is the strange, pompous foreign boy Gustavus Barmilevo invited to the children's home by Bill for the holidays? The children soon discover that he is a prince, named Aloysius Gramondie, and has revolutionaries on his trail who want to overthrow his uncle and place the prince on the throne as a puppet ruler. Jack and Kiki find themselves following the others, who are kidnapped and taken to the strange country of Tauri Hessia; but he finds help with a circus. Will Jack be able to rescue the others with the help of his new friends and decide the fate of an entire nation?

=== The River of Adventure ===
While recovering from influenza, the four children and their family travel to the fictional town of Barira, near the border of Syria, where Bill has been asked to watch a known criminal named Raya Uma. When Bill and Mrs Cunningham are captured, the children attempt to find them, but find themselves lost in an underground temple with buried treasure.

== Television and film adaptations ==
Beginning in 1995, the Adventure Series was adapted for television by Cloud 9 and producer Raymond Thompson with production taking place in New Zealand. The main characters were all the same as in the books, but the stories were set in modern times. This did not greatly affect the plot of the stories, though Jack owned a pocket computer which played a significant role in a couple of the adventures, particularly in "The Ship of Adventure". "The Mountain of Adventure" was set in the German Alps, rather than the Welsh mountains as in the books. Also, many of the TV adaptations featured bumbling henchmen for comic relief, including Ray Uma's henchman, Taj, in "The River of Adventure", who appeared to be more intelligent than his master, and had a major role in the episode's plot. The TV series also introduced a character who was not in the books- Sir George Houghton, Cunningham's rich, underworked boss, who appeared in every episode except "The Valley of Adventure". A running gag was that he always phoned Cunningham with an urgent assignment just as the family were planning a holiday- in "The Ship of Adventure", Bill had to postpone his wedding for this reason- yet Sir George appeared to be a gentleman of leisure. He was only seen doing real work a couple of times in the entire series- he was shown playing pool and golf, and on one occasion, he was seen fishing, though he lied that he was in the office.

The series, which cost 6.2 million pounds, aired on Channel 5 and the Disney Channel in the UK. It was released on DVD in Australia by Umbrella Entertainment in 2010 and has been released digitally by Cloud 9 on YouTube and other broadcasters in several countries, including a "making of" documentary. A recurring location in the series was a house constructed overlooking Mana Island.

The series was featured in the Enid Blyton Society Journal published by the Enid Blyton Society with written contributions from actors David Taylor and Jennyfer Jewell, who played Jack and Lucy-Ann, in 1997, and a retrospective published in 2016.

A series of novelisations of the TV series was published in 1997 by HarperCollins.

The Island of Adventure was adapted into a 1982 British film directed by Anthony Squire, and starring Norman Bowler as Bill along with Wilfrid Brambell and Eleanor Summerfield.
