= The Mystery of the Disappearing Cat =

1944 book by Enid Blyton

- First edition
- Author: Enid Blyton
- Illustrator: Joseph Abbey
- Language: English
- Series: The Five Find-Outers
- Genre: Children's mystery
- Publisher: Methuen and Co Ltd
- Publication date: 1944
- Publication place: United Kingdom
- Preceded by: The Mystery of the Burnt Cottage
- Followed by: The Mystery of the Secret Room

The Mystery of the Disappearing Cat (1944) is the second in the Five Find-Outers series of children's mystery novels by Enid Blyton. It was published by Methuen and Co Ltd and follows the first book in the series, The Mystery of the Burnt Cottage. It tells of a stolen cat the group of children work to find.

== Plot ==
Luke, a friend of the Five Find-Outers, is working in Lady Candling's garden when her valuable Siamese cat is stolen. The Five Find-Outers and Dog work to solve the case.

Next door to Pip and Bets Hilton lives Lady Candling, whose prize cat, Dark Queen (a valuable Siamese), disappears under the nose of Luke, the gardener's help and a friend of the Find-Outers. Mr Tupping, (the gardener), is a nasty character who the children immediately decide could be the thief, but he wasn't in the area when Dark Queen was stolen. All the evidence points to poor Luke, so the Find-Outers investigate, not believing he is the thief.

There are other possible suspects on Lady Candling's staff, such as Miss Harmer the cat handler and Miss Trimble, who takes care of the roses. Mr Tupping is still the prime suspect though and it turns out that he stole Dark Queen in the morning, then painted a small patch of cream-colored paint to another cat's tail to disguise it as Dark Queen, who had a distinctive cream patch on its tail. Then he made Luke work beside the cage all day, so that he would be the obvious suspect. In the afternoon, Mr Tupping rubbed the paint off the bogus cat's tail and then announced Dark Queen was gone. Mr Tupping is finally caught and it turns out he has previously been involved with animal stealing.

== Characters ==
The Main Characters

- Elizabeth "Bets" Hliton — the youngest of the Five Find-Outers
- Philip "Pip" Hilton— a member of the Five Find-Outers and brother of Bets
- Lawrence "Larry" Daykin— the leader of the Five Find-Outers
- Margaret "Daisy" Daykin— Larry's sister and a founder of the Five Find-Outers
- Frederick Algernon "Fatty" Trotteville — the smartest of the Five Find-Outers and leader of the group
- Buster — Fatty's Scottish Terrier dog
- Mr Goon — the bumbling village Policeman

Suspects

- Luke — Mr Tupping's 15-year old assistant gardener and friend of the Five Find-Outers and Dog
- Lady Candling — the owner of the stolen valuable cat
- Miss Harmer — the employee who takes care of Lady Candling's cats
- Miss Trimble — Lady Candling's companion
- Mr. Tupping — the rude and bad tempered gardener of Lady Candling
