= The Mystery of the Vanished Prince =

1951 book by Enid Blyton

- First edition cover
- Author: Enid Blyton
- Illustrator: Treyer Evans
- Language: English
- Series: The Five Find-Outers
- Genre: Children's novel
- Publisher: Methuen
- Publication date: 1951
- Publication place: United Kingdom
- Preceded by: The Mystery of the Invisible Thief
- Followed by: The Mystery of the Strange Bundle

The Mystery of the Vanished Prince, published in 1951, is the ninth novel in the Five Find-Outers series of children's mysteries, written by Enid Blyton.

== Plot ==
Fatty has returned to Peterswood village from a cruise holiday, bringing Moroccan costumes for his friends Larry, Daisy, Pip and Bets. The four try on the exotic outfits, at which point they receive a visit from Ern Goon (a nephew of Mr Goon, the policeman) and his brothers, twins Sid and Perce. Fatty tricks Ern into believing the disguised children are relatives and friends of Prince Bongawah of Tetarua State, a foreign royal who is supposedly staying at a summer camp alongside the caravan site where the three Goon brothers are camping. The children go for a walk and encounter Ern's uncle, Mr Goon, who is also duped into believing the disguised children are foreigners.

Later, Prince Bongawah is reported to have disappeared. Goon informs the district's senior police officer, Inspector Jenks, that he has met with the prince's relatives. Realising the children's deception could jeopardize the police investigation, Fatty tells Goon the foreign party was not real. He also advises Inspector Jenks of the ruse, earning a stern reprimand. Fatty then resolves to share all information on the case with Goon.

Sid, whose verbal communication is hampered by his fondness for toffees that stick his teeth together, manages to tell Fatty that he saw the missing prince hiding in the base of a large double-pram, used by a woman for her twin babies at a caravan next to the boys' campsite. The Find-Outers try to track down the woman, with Fatty, disguised as a peddler, befriending the woman's son, Rollo, who reveals the real prince was kidnapped before arriving at the camp. Rollo, who had been posing as the prince, also divulges the likely location of the captive as Raylingham Marshes. Fatty passes on this information to Mr Goon, who takes a late-night train to the area.

The following day, the Find-Outers and Ern also go the marshes, but they are captured and locked inside a farmhouse. As a helicopter arrives to take away the prince, Fatty manages to telephone Inspector Jenks and then locates the prince, but the children are unable to escape until the police arrive and arrest the crooks. Mr Goon is subsequently found, furious and dishevelled, locked in a shed. Fatty releases him, sympathises with his misfortune and kindly praises him in front of the inspector.

== Characters ==
As with all books in the Find-Outers Mystery series, the protagonists are Frederick Algernon Trotteville, known as Fatty; siblings Philip (Pip) and Elizabeth (Bets) Hilton; and siblings Laurence (Larry) and Margaret (Daisy) Daykin; as well as Fatty's dog, Buster. The incompetent and bad-tempered village policeman, Mr Goon, also appears in all of the books, as does his superior Inspector Jenks (who is promoted to Chief Inspector and Superintendent). This book also features Mr Goon's nephew, Ern, and Ern's younger twin brothers, Sid and Perce.
