= The Mystery of the Spiteful Letters =

1946 book by Enid Blyton

- First edition cover
- Author: Enid Blyton
- Illustrator: Joseph Abbey
- Language: English
- Series: The Five Find-Outers
- Genre: Children's novel
- Publisher: Methuen
- Publication date: 1946
- Publication place: United Kingdom
- Preceded by: The Mystery of the Secret Room
- Followed by: The Mystery of the Missing Necklace

The Mystery of the Spiteful Letters was the fourth book in Enid Blyton's The Five Find-Outers children's mystery series. The novel was published in 1946 by Methuen and illustrated by Joseph Abbey.

== Plot ==
An adventure for the Five Find-Outers and their dog. Fatty, Larry, Daisy, Pip, Bets and Buster become involved in a very peculiar situation when a series of unsigned letters are sent to various people in Peterswood.

The Five Find-Outers — Fatty, Larry, Daisy, Pip and Bets, and their Scottie dog, Buster — are shocked when someone starts sending anonymous spiteful letters to several people in their village of Peterswood. Pip and Bets are involved when their young maid Gladys receives one of the letters, which reveals a secret — her parents are in prison for theft and she has lived in a girls home. Frightened and distraught, Gladys leaves her job. The children decide that they must discover who is sending the letters. They make a list of suspects — could the letter writer be Mr. Nosey a busybody or Miss Tittle a lover of gossip — or someone else? Their arch-enemy, village policeman Mr Goon is also on the case, and the children must hurry to solve the mystery before he does.
