= The Mystery of Holly Lane =

1953 mystery novel by Enid Blyton

- First edition cover
- Author: Enid Blyton
- Illustrator: Treyer Evans
- Language: English
- Series: The Five Find-Outers
- Genre: Children's novel
- Publisher: Methuen
- Publication date: 1953
- Publication place: United Kingdom
- Preceded by: The Mystery of the Strange Bundle
- Followed by: The Mystery of Tally-Ho Cottage

The Mystery of Holly Lane is a 1953 children's mystery novel by English author Enid Blyton, and the eleventh book in the Five Find-Outers series.

== Plot ==
The Five Find-Outers (Fatty, Larry, Daisy, Pip and Bets) are together again during the school holidays. Bored without a mystery to solve, they decide to practise disguising themselves and shadowing people. Larry dresses up as a window cleaner and unexpectedly the five children come across a robbery at a house in Holly Lane, the windows of which Larry has cleaned. The house belongs to a blind old man, who has apparently hidden his savings somewhere in the furniture. When the man reports the money stolen, the Find-Outers initially believe it to be a simple robbery, but then in the middle of the night, all the old man's furniture is mysteriously spirited away as well.

The suspects include Wilfrid, the old man's grandson, and his cousin Marian. When Marian herself disappears, suspicion falls firmly on her and bumbling village policeman Mr Goon is convinced she is the thief, but Fatty thinks differently.

== Characters ==
The Five Find-Outers and Dog:

- Fatty (Frederick Algernon Trotteville)
- Larry (Lawrence Daykin)
- Daisy (Margaret Daykin)
- Pip (Philip Hilton)
- Bets (Elizabeth Hilton)
- Buster - (Fatty's Scottie dog)

Other characters:

- Marian - the blind old man's granddaughter
- Mr Goon - the village policeman
- Mr Henri - a Frenchman who is staying next door to the house in Holly Lane
- Victim - blind old man
- Wilfred - nephew of the victim
- Superintendent Jenks - the local police-chief and friend of the Five Find-Outers
