= The Mystery of Banshee Towers =

1961 book by Enid Blyton

- First edition cover
- Author: Enid Blyton
- Illustrator: Jenny Chapple
- Language: English
- Series: The Five Find-Outers
- Genre: Children's novel
- Publisher: Methuen
- Publication date: 1961
- Publication place: United Kingdom
- Preceded by: The Mystery of the Strange Messages

The Mystery of Banshee Towers by Enid Blyton is the last children's mystery novel in a series of fifteen known collectively as The Five Find-Outers and Dog. The series ran for eighteen years, from 1943 to 1961.

== Plot summary ==
During a school holiday, the children are told by their parents to spend their time visiting sites in the surrounding countryside, rather than searching for mysteries in their village of Peterswood. The children visit an old stately home, Banshee Towers, that is exhibiting famous sea paintings, which Ern and Bets love. The Towers are reputedly haunted and wailing noises are driving visitors away. On a subsequent visit, Ern spots that a small boat he admired on one of the paintings is missing. On pointing this out to the owner, the children unwittingly place themselves in danger. After investigating, they discover the owner of the Towers has been conspiring with an art forger and a second member of staff, to replace the collection with copies and sell the originals. The story ends with Fatty saying they will have many more mysteries to solve.

This book is a standalone in that the Five Find-Outers enter a cave and a secret passage for the first time in their history, more reminiscent of the Famous Five and Secret Seven. The mystery is not divided up by assigning investigative tasks to each of the five children as was normally the case and Fatty more or less solves this one on his own.

== Characters ==
The Five Find-Outers and the Dog

- Frederick Algernon "Fatty" Trotteville – the leader of the Five Find-Outers
- Laurence "Larry" Daykin – a member of the Five
- Margaret "Daisy" Daykin – a member of the Five
- Philip "Pip" Hilton – a member of the Five
- Elizabeth "Bets" Hilton – a member of the Five
- Ernest "Ern" Goon – Mr Goon's nephew and the Five's friend
- Buster – Fatty's jet-black Scottish Terrier
- Bingo – pet dog of Ern

The Police Force

- Theophilus Goon – the local policeman and a rival of the five
- Superintendent Jenks – the police superintendent and the five's friend

The "Jolly Bad Lot" persons

- Flint
- Mr. Engler
- Poussin
- Francois Henri Ortalo
