= The Mystery of the Hidden House =

1948 book by Enid Blyton

- First edition cover
- Author: Enid Blyton
- Illustrator: Joseph Abbey
- Language: English
- Series: The Five Find-Outers
- Genre: Children's novel
- Publisher: Methuen
- Publication date: 1948
- Publication place: United Kingdom
- Preceded by: The Mystery of the Missing Necklace
- Followed by: The Mystery of the Pantomime Cat

The Mystery of the Hidden House is the sixth in the series of Five Find-Outers children's mystery novels by Enid Blyton. It was first published in 1948 by Methuen and was illustrated by Joseph Abbey.

== Synopsis ==
Pip, Bets, Larry and Daisy mistake Ernest "Ern" Goon, the village policeman's nephew, for their good friend Fatty in one of his disguises. When Ern tells this to Mr Goon, the policeman asks the children's parents to ban them from solving another mystery. The children then invent a fake mystery about kidnappers and robbers on Christmas Hill, hoping Ern will pass the information on to Mr Goon. They also encourage Ern to investigate at Christmas Hill, where Larry and Pip plan to flash some lights and Fatty will hide himself to give Ern a scare.

Meanwhile, Mr Goon finds Ern's notes about the "mystery" and threatens to punish him. Mr. Goon then goes out at night to investigate the hill. Ern sets out to follow him but goes in the wrong direction, along the road to "Harry's Folly", where he witnesses some mysterious voices, footsteps and lights. He tells the Find-Outers, who don't believe him at first, but then decide to investigate.

Fatty dresses as Ern for fun and consequently Ern is captured and taken to Harry's Folly. Bets suggests to Fatty that Ern may be there and Fatty investigates, with Pip and Larry in tow. They find Ern and Fatty asks him to wait until the next morning so the crooks can be captured. Inspector Jenks later sends six police cars to Harry's Folly. Ern is rescued and promises to tear up a rude poem that Fatty wrote about Mr Goon.

== Characters ==
- Bets – the youngest of the Five Find-Outers
- Pip – a member of the Five Find-Outers
- Larry – the former chief of the Five Find-Outers
- Daisy – a member of the Five Find-Outers
- Fatty – the chief of the Five Find-Outers
- Buster – a dog owned by Fatty
- Mr. Holland – a garage owner who is also a criminal
- Mr. Peters – the gatekeeper of "Harry's Folly"
- Ern Goon – the nephew of Mr Goon
- Mr. Goon – Peterwood's local policeman
- Inspector Jenks – a friend of the Five Find-Outers and Dog
- Mr and Mrs. Hilton – parents of Pip (Philip Hilton) and Bets (Elizabeth Hilton)
