= Island of Adventure =

Island of Adventure may refer to:

- Universal Islands of Adventure, a theme park a part of the Universal Orlando Resort.
- The Island of Adventure, a children's book by Enid Blyton.
- The Swiss Family Robinson (1975 TV series), shown as Island of Adventure in some countries.
