= The Mystery of the Strange Messages =

Novel by Enid Blyton

- First edition
- Author: Enid Blyton
- Illustrator: Lilian Buchanan
- Language: English
- Series: The Five Find-Outers
- Genre: Children's novel
- Publisher: Methuen (1st edition)
- Publication date: 1957
- Publication place: United Kingdom
- Preceded by: The Mystery of the Missing Man
- Followed by: The Mystery of Banshee Towers

The Mystery of the Strange Messages is a children's mystery novel written by Enid Blyton and published in 1957. It is the fourteenth book in the Five Find-Outers series featuring Fatty, Pip, Larry, Daisy, Bets and Buster the Scottie dog, as well as Mr Goon and his nephew Ern.

== Plot ==
Mr Goon receives some messages which ask him to turn out the Smiths from where they live (The Ivies) and to ask Smith his real name. Upon investigating the messages Mr Goon finds that there is no such house as The Ivies and there are around 15 people with the surname Smith in Peterswood. He is convinced that the Find-Outers are playing a trick on him and visits them, but they have nothing to do with it. Meanwhile, the Find-Outers are also on the case and they decide to search for a house covered with ivy. They find four houses but rule out all of them, including Fairlin Hall, which is empty.

The next day, Daisy finds that smoke is coming from the chimney at Fairlin Hall. Upon investigation the Find-Outers find that two caretakers live in it named Mr and Mrs Smith and that the building was previously called The Ivies. The name was changed because Wilfrid Hasterley (the son of the owners of the house) stole some diamonds with two of his friends. Wilfrid and one of the friends were arrested - a third friend escaped to Burma. Wilfrid died in jail and his second friend was eventually released.

Mr Goon gets a new letter in which The Ivies was now named as Fairlin Hall. He goes to Fairlin Hall and turns out the caretakers (the Smiths), after discovering that Mr Smith was really Mr Canley, who had previously been imprisoned for spying.

It is later reported that two men have bought Fairlin Hall and had keys to it. Fatty continues investigating the real reason why the messages had been sent to Mr Goon, which was to turn out the Smiths. He finds out that the two remaining robbers had met up and were trying to find the stolen diamonds which were hidden in Fairlin Hall, but their search had been hampered by the Smiths. The only person with authority to turn them out was Mr Goon, so they found out the truth about Mr Smith and had Mr Goon evict them. After more investigation Fatty finds where the diamonds are hidden, but just as he is about to call the police, the two men arrive and lock him in a cupboard. Mr Goon's nephew Ern is outside waiting for Fatty, but when he realises that Fatty has been captured, he asks for help from a passer-by who phones Mr Goon. Buster arrives and attacks the two men while Ern rescues Fatty. Buster also goes for Mr Goon and they both fall into the cupboard that Fatty had been locked in. The two men close and lock the door, but Ern drives them away and they fall into a coal hole.

The next day, Fatty phones Superintendent Jenks who arrives at Fairlin Hall. A furious Mr Goon and Buster are rescued from the locked cupboard and the two robbers are taken from the coal hole and arrested. The diamonds are found hidden in a pipe in the bathroom.
