= The Mystery of the Missing Necklace =

1947 book by Enid Blyton

- First edition cover
- Author: Enid Blyton
- Illustrator: Joseph Abbey
- Language: English
- Series: The Five Find-Outers
- Genre: Children's novel
- Publisher: Methuen
- Publication date: 1947
- Publication place: United Kingdom
- Preceded by: The Mystery of the Spiteful Letters
- Followed by: The Mystery of the Hidden House

The Mystery of the Missing Necklace — is a book in the series of Five Find-Outers children's mystery novels by Enid Blyton, published in 1947 by Methuen and illustrated by Joseph Abbey.

== Plot ==
Why is Mr Goon rushing around Peterswood looking extremely busy? The Find-Outers want to know why, and so ask their very good friend, Inspector Jenks. He informs them that Peterswood is the meeting place of a very clever gang of jewel thieves. So the Find-Outers decide to try and help the police, by keeping their eyes open for anyone who looks suspicious. Fatty disguises himself as an old man, sitting on a bench in the village so he can observe anything unusual without looking suspicious. Meanwhile, Mr Goon is also conducting his own investigations when he finds out the meeting place of the gangs. In the middle of the night Mr Goon and his men raid the meeting place. The gang is arrested, but one man manages to escape, taking the necklace with him. The man is later arrested but the necklace is not found. Mr Goon and the children are now searching for the missing necklace before the last remaining gang member finds the necklace. The Find-Outers later find the necklace, and the last man of the gang is arrested.
