= Raymond Sheppard =

British artist

- Born: 3 March 1913
- Died: 1958 (aged 44–45)
- Occupation: Artist

Raymond Sheppard (3 March 1913 – 21 April 1958) was a British artist and illustrator of books for children and adults. He wrote books on drawing techniques, but is best known for his illustrations of Ernest Hemingway's 1952 novel The Old Man and the Sea and the works of Jim Corbett.

== Life ==
Sheppard was born on 3 March 1913, and was educated at Christ's College, Finchley. From childhood he had a love of nature, from his time playing in Scratchwood in Mill Hill, north-west London, to his time spent in London Zoo sketching live animals. He studied art at Bolt Court under S.G. Boxsius and from October 1940 to January 1946 served as a Leading Aircraftsman in the RAF.

He became a Fellow of the Zoological Society (F.Z.S, 1946); and a member of the Society of Graphic Artists (S.G.A, 1947), the Pastel Society (P.S., 1948), and the Royal Institute of Painters in Water Colours (R.I, 1949).

In the 1940s Sheppard wrote and illustrated a number of books for The Studio magazine, explaining techniques on how to draw birds and zoo animals. This was followed by a successful career as a story illustrator for Lilliput, as well as for leading authors of the day such as Enid Blyton and Jim Corbett. He is best known for his original illustrations of The Old Man and the Sea by Ernest Hemingway that he was commissioned to produce at the same time as Charles Tunnicliffe. The published version contained illustrations from both artists. He was also a founding member of the Wapping Group of Artists, officially launched in 1946.

Sheppard had a long battle with cancer from 1945 until his death in 1958.

== Memberships ==
- Royal Academy of Arts (R.A.)
- Royal Institute of Painters in Water Colours (R.I.)
- Royal Society of Arts (R.S.A.)
- Wapping Group of Artists (Founder Member)
- Chelsea Arts Club
- The Pastel Society (1948)
- Royal Institute of Painters in Watercolours (1949)
- Langham Sketch Club
- Zoological Society of London (Fellow)

== Publications ==
Sheppard's work was used in publications including Lilliput, The Studio, Picture Post, John Bull and Everybody's.

=== As author ===
- How to Draw Birds (Studio, 1940)
- Drawing at the Zoo (Studio, 1949)
- More Birds to Draw (Studio, 1956)

=== As illustrator ===
- The Rolling Year (W. J. Blyton) (Blackie and Son, 1936)
- The Silent Hunter (Phyllis Briggs) (Blackie, 1939)
- Man-Eaters of Kumaon (Jim Corbett) (Oxford University Press, 1947)
- Tam Tain's Trout Book (Tam Tain) (W & R Chambers, 1947)
- The Man-eating Leopard of Rudraprayag (Jim Corbett) (Oxford University Press, 1948)
- The Adventures of Pip (Enid Blyton) (Sampson Low, 1948)
- More Adventures of Pip (Enid Blyton) (Sampson Low, 1948)
- Birds of Woodland and Hedgerow (Elizabeth Gould) (Blackie, 1950)
- The Old Man and the Sea (Ernest Hemingway) (The Reprint Society, 1952)
- Iceblink (Rutherford Montgomery) (Hutchinson, 1952)
- The Temple Tiger and More Man-eaters of Kumaon (Jim Corbett) (Oxford University Press, 1954)
- The Island of Birds (Olivia FitzRoy) (Jonathan Cape, 1954)
- Tree Tops (Jim Corbett) (Oxford University Press, 1955)
- MINADO - The Devil Dog (Erle Wilson) (Andre Deutsch, 1955)
- Way for a Sailor (Peter Dawlish) (Oxford University Press, 1955)
- The Hunted Head (Olivia FitzRoy) (Jonathan Cape, 1956)
- Seal Morning (Rowena Farre) (Hutchinson, 1957)
- The Constant Fisherman (Major H E Morritt) (A & C Black, 1957)
- Fire in the Flint (Wilfrid Robertson) (Basil Blackwell. Oxford, 1957)
- Tan. A Wild Dog (Thomas C. Hinkle) (Collins, 1957)
- Seal Morning (Rowena Farre) (Hutchinson, 1957)
- Animal Doctor (Laurence Meynell) (Oxford University Press, 1958)
- Adventures of Huckleberry Finn (Mark Twain) (Glasgow: Blackie & Son Limited, ?)
- The Adventures of Tom Sawyer (Mark Twain) (Glasgow: Blackie & Son Limited, ?)

HAMPTON ON PIKE FISHING by J[ohn] Fitzgerald Hampton London & Edinburgh:W & R. Chambers Limited, 1947
