= The Mystery of the Invisible Thief =

1950 book by Enid Blyton

- First edition cover, art by Jean Main
- Author: Enid Blyton
- Illustrator: Treyer Evans
- Language: English
- Series: The Five Find-Outers
- Genre: Children's novel
- Publisher: Methuen
- Publication date: 1950
- Publication place: United Kingdom
- Preceded by: The Mystery of the Pantomime Cat
- Followed by: The Mystery of the Vanished Prince

The Mystery of the Invisible Thief is a novel written by Enid Blyton. It is the eighth in the popular The Five Find-Outers children's mystery series. It was published in 1950.

== Plot ==
The Five Find-Outers are having tea at a local gymkhana with Inspector Jenks and his god-daughter Hilary, when a robbery occurs in a nearby house. The robber disappears from the scene of the crime without a trace and when the burgled house turns out to be Hilary's, the children have the perfect excuse to investigate.

The mysterious thief leaves only a few clues behind — enormous footprints, glove prints, a strange criss-cross mark on the ground and two torn pieces of paper. The only people in the village with feet big enough to fit the footprints are Mr Goon (the local policeman) and Colonel Cross, neither of whom seem a likely culprit.

Fatty uses his disguises to gather important information and in doing so outwits Mr Goon, especially when both go at the same time to see Colonel Cross to ask him about his large shoes.

The thief strikes again on a number of occasions, once in Fatty's own shed and at the house of a Mrs Williams. On each occasion the same clues are found — but apparently nobody sees the thief.

Tired and frustrated at their lack of progress, Pip plays a practical joke on the others, wearing a pair of large boots and leaving giant footprints for the others to find and search in vain for the thief. When found out, the others are angry with Pip, until suddenly Fatty declares that Pip has solved the mystery. The thief has also done what Pip has done in jest and turns out to be the baker, a small man, who used the boots to give the impression that he was much larger. This allowed him to use escape options such as climbing out of a window and down a drainpipe, that would have been impossible for a bigger man.

== Characters ==
- Fatty (Frederick) Trotteville - intelligent, smart, brave leader, who is a master of disguise
- Larry (Laurence) - oldest member of the five and former leader
- Daisy - member of the five, whose initial idea it was to form a team
- Pip (Phillip) Hilton - member of the five
- Bets - youngest member of the five
- Mr Tonks - policeman who replaced Mr Goon
- Mr Goon - the village policeman known as Clear-Orf, who resents the interference of the Five-Find Outers
- The Baker - a suspect, later found to be the thief
- Inspector Jenks - head of the Peterswood police department
- Hilary - god-daughter of Inspector Jenks

== Note ==
A similar strategy to the one used in this book (a small man using larger shoes to appear bigger than he is), was used by Enid Blyton's Secret Seven book, Shock for the Secret Seven, although there the criminal was a dog-napper rather than a thief.
