= The Mystery of the Strange Bundle =

1952 book by Enid Blyton

- First edition cover
- Author: Enid Blyton
- Illustrator: Treyer Evans
- Language: English
- Series: The Five Find-Outers
- Genre: Children's novel
- Publisher: Methuen
- Publication date: 1952
- Publication place: United Kingdom
- Preceded by: The Mystery of the Vanished Prince
- Followed by: The Mystery of Holly Lane

The Mystery of the Strange Bundle is a children's mystery novel written by Enid Blyton and published in 1952. It is the tenth book of The Five Find-Outers series.

== Plot ==
The Find-Outers (Fatty, Larry, Daisy, Pip, Bets and Buster the dog) are desperate for a new mystery to investigate. While they wait, Fatty has been using his newly learned skill of ventriloquism for pranks, especially against his nemesis Mr Goon, the village policeman.

The gang discover that a house nearby has been ransacked and the tenant, Mr Fellows, is missing. The gang investigate and determine that Mr Fellows must have run away carrying a mysterious bundle, while the burglar was breaking in.

Fatty, while in disguise, questions some night watchmen and discovers they saw Fellows that night. But Fatty is then approached by Mr Goon, who mistakes him for a suspicious stranger. To create a distraction, Fatty throws a sack of rocks in the river saying it belongs to Fellows and escapes.

The next day, Mr Goon attempts to retrieve Fatty's decoy sack but, unbeknownst to him, finds a different sack with doll's clothes in it. In fury, he attacks Fatty for wasting his time and stuffs the clothes down Fatty's collar. This fracas is witnessed by the burglar.

When the gang examine the clothes they determine this must be the bundle Mr Fellows dumped in the river. They find a hanky in the clothing embroidered with the name Eurydice. Fatty deduces this must be clothing for a ventriloquist's dummy, because Eurydice was a famous ventriloquist from ancient Greece. While they examine the clothes, Buster hides one of the doll's shoes in the shed.

The gang has a setback when the doll's clothes are stolen, which they presume is by the burglar who ransacked Fellows' home.

Once Inspector Jenks hears that Fatty has information on Eurydice, he visits the gang to discuss what they know. He reveals there is a ventriloquist operating as a British spy called Mr Eurydice. The clothing is for his dummy and he has hidden secrets in them. They believe they contain a list of persons of interest. Although the clothes have been stolen, they find the shoe Buster had hidden earlier and this contains the vital list.
