= Mystery Room =

Mystery Room may referrer to:

- Layton Brothers: Mystery Room, a 2012 puzzle adventure video game
- The Mystery Room in the Sears-Kay Ruin Fort in Carefree, Arizona
- The Mystery Room in the Arizona Biltmore Hotel in Phoenix, Arizona

== See also ==
- Locked-room mystery, a type of crime seen in crime and detective fiction
- Room: The Mystery, a 2014 Indian thriller film
- The Mystery of the Secret Room, a 1945 children's novels by Enid Blyton
