= The Mystery of the Pantomime Cat =

Novel by Enid Blyton

- First edition cover
- Author: Enid Blyton
- Illustrator: Joseph Abbey
- Language: English
- Series: The Five Find-Outers
- Genre: Children's novel
- Publisher: Methuen
- Publication date: 1949
- Publication place: United Kingdom
- Preceded by: The Mystery of the Hidden House
- Followed by: The Mystery of the Invisible Thief

The Mystery of the Pantomime Cat, published 1949, is the seventh novel in the Five Find-Outers children's mystery series written by Enid Blyton.

== Plot ==
A theatre safe is rifled — and the main suspect is Boysie the Pantomime Cat and his friend Zoe. The five find-outers and dog are on the track with the help of PC Pippin, who is standing in for Mr. Goon. Despite all the false clues the Find-Outers have planted to throw the police off the scent, they finally discover the perpetrator.

=== Chapter Summary by Duncan McLaren ===
1. AT THE RAILWAY STATION

It's the Easter holidays and Larry, Daisy and Fatty are at the station waiting for Pip and Bets. Also there is Goon who is meeting another policeman called Pippin who is going to take over from Goon while he has a break from Peterswood.

2. A NICE LITTLE PLAN FOR PIPPIN

The Find Outers decide that Larry and Fatty will disguise themselves and leave clues to a bogus mystery for Pippin to find.

3. TWO RUFFIANS - AND P.C. PIPPIN

Larry and Fatty get changed at Larry's house, because it's closer than Fatty's house to where they want to lie in wait for Pippin on his rounds. Dressed as horrible-looking ruffians they tear up a note which says 'Behind Little Theatre. Ten p.m. on Friday'. They leave the torn up fragments on the ground. This is what Pippin finds when Fatty and Larry scarper.

4. PLENTY OF RED-HEADS - AND PLENTY OF CLUES

Fatty teases Pippin all day by going around in a variety of red-headed disguises. The Find-Outers decide what false clues they will deposit outside the Little Theatre for Pippin's benefit. A hanky with the initial Z on it, some cigarette ends, matches and a page torn from a timetable with a particular train underlined, are designed to send Pippin on the next stage of a wild goose chase.

5. P.C. PIPPIN ON THE JOB

After depositing the false clues outside the back door of the Little Theatre, Fatty gets a shock when he catches sight of the pantomime cat looking out of the window at him, mournfully.

When Larry and Pip join Fatty and look as well, they see the cat by the electric fire waving at them, thinking they're children who have been to see the show. This is at seven o'clock and the Find-Outers have already seen the rest of the cast walk off after performing the show, though Enid does not describe them for us in any detail.

At 8.30 (long before the mysterious meeting supposedly set for 10 pm) Pippin turns up. From the verandah, he sees a furry animal lying in front of the fire, eventually realizing it must be Dick Whittington's cat. He then notices all the clues that the Find-Outers have left for him, which he gathers up for further investigation. He then climbs up a hole in the verandah roof where he intends to wait for the meeting that he's been led to believe in. But he hears a noise in the first floor room and sees someone slumped at a desk with an overturned cup in a saucer beside him.

Pippin sees that a mirror has been taken down off the wall and a safe opened. There's been a robbery!

6. A MYSTERY BEGINS

The next morning, Fatty reads about the robbery on the back of his father's paper over breakfast. The Find-Outers meet at Pip and Bets playroom and they realize that the laying of false clues will have complicated the police's investigation. Fatty decides to go and talk to Pippin but soon sees that Goon is back and shouting at his subordinate.

7. GOON - PIPPIN - AND FATTY

Goon strikes Buster with a poker, which upsets Pippin as well as Fatty.

With Goon having left the police house, Fatty and Pippin establish a rapport, though Fatty decides not to tell him about the false clues as it is Goon that is going to follow these up. Fatty impresses Pippin who thinks: 'Brains? Yes. Character? Plenty! Cheek? Too much. Pluck? Any amount.'

Fatty tells Pippin that the Find-Outers were round the back of the Little Theatre from about 5.30 (actually, they set off on their bikes for the place at ten to 6, a minor mistake by Enid). And were there until 7pm. And Fatty tells Pippin about seeing the pantomime cat, both at the window and sitting by the fire.

8. PIPPIN'S STORY - AND A MEETING

Pippin then tells Fatty what he saw. So we get all that again. Starting with the pantomime cat lying, sleeping by the fire to the manager stretched out across his desk. The tea dregs has been tested by the police and the drink was drugged. And the manager when interviewed had said that it was the pantomime cat who had brought him the tea. Boysie, the simple-minded man who plays the part of the cat, is then discussed. And Pippin confirms that according to the manager no-one else was in the building.

It's established that whoever robbed the safe had insider knowledge and that it had to be one of the cast. Had someone come back and done the robbery with Boysie's help? At this point Goon returns, so Fatty leaves and updates the Find-Outers. They all feel sorry for Buster, wonder about Boysie, and look forward to meeting Goon at Peterswood station when he follows up their false clue.

9. PIPPIN IS A HELP

Although Goon is around and making things awkward, Fatty arranges a meeting with Pippin in the lemonade shop. Pippin is able to give Fatty the names and addresses of the other actors and informs him that the young woman who plays Dick Whittington is called Zoe, making Fatty feel most uncomfortable about the dropped hanky with the Z sewn into it by Daisy. However, Zoe has an alibi - they all have alibis, and Fatty realizes that checking these alibis is what the Find Outers must do themselves. He has another chat with Pippin during which they meet Goon again.

It has to be said that by this stage in the book, Enid's under-mind would not have had to be particularly active. An entertaining story is being told, with lots of character and visual details to keep the reader entertained. But as for the mystery, well either Boysie did it, or a member of the cast came back and did it with or without Boysie's help.

10. THE SUSPECTS AND THEIR ALIBIS

Back at Pip and Bet's place, the Find Outers have a conference. They read Pippin's notes about the suspects and their alibis, which start with Boysie who took the manager a cup of tea at eight o'clock. Boysie says he didn't, but admits he had cup of tea himself after which he went to sleep for most of the evening.

After going through the outline of the alibis of the seven suspects, Fatty suggests that they use their autograph books as an excuse to meet them all, hopefully leading to discussions. Fatty then shows how they can go about checking the alibis, using the example of Zoe, whose sister Daisy knows, and Lucy White, whose alibi has a connection with Larry and Daisy. Fatty becomes a bit vague as to how some of the alibis are to be checked, but exudes confidence that they will find a way. Which could very much be Enid expressing confidence in her own creative imagination. Sure, the Find-Outers will find a way of checking those alibis. But first they've got to meet the train that Goon has been tricked into meeting!

11. TREAT FOR MR. GOON

Disguised in a red wig, Fatty gets off the train in Peterswood and leads Goon on a wild goose chase. After changing back into himself in his shed, he mocks Goon in front of the rest of the Find Outers.

12. ZOE, THE FIRST SUSPECT

Daisy and Bets plan to approach Zoe through her sister, whose daughter is celebrating her fourth birthday. They buy the girl a present and are getting along well with her mother when Zoe arrives. Daisy and Bets take an immediate liking to Zoe. Enid also appears to like her. Zoe tells them that the manager dismissed her on Friday after she supported Boysie in an argument. On the night of the robbery, Zoe was staying with her sister. She had gone to the post office at seven o'clock, but her sister did not hear her return. By the time Zoe came downstairs from her room, it was quarter to eight, leaving her without an alibi. Despite this, Bets and Daisy are convinced that she did not commit the robbery. They feel guilty about the handkerchief bearing the letter Z, which Goon is treating as important evidence.

13. LARRY AND PIP ON THE JOB

Before they go, the girls tell Zoe that the five Find-Outers are coming to see the show that Monday afternoon and Zoe says she will make sure all the cast give them autographs immediately afterwards. In Bet's playroom, they meet up with Larry and Pip. Those two had been to the theatre to interview the grumpy manager. They asked him if Boysie - the pantomime cat - brought him his tea on the night of the robbery and he confirms that he did, though he just glanced at Boysie, still in his cat-skin. He reports that Goon has got Boysie scared, shouting at him until he bursts into tears. (Although Enid saves this 'revelation' for later, it must have been obvious to her conscious mind that it could have been someone else in the cat suit rather than Boysie.)

14. MORE NEWS - AND A VERY FAT FACE

Meanwhile Fatty has had a busy morning. Firstly teasing Goon with a running joke of wearing cheek pads to make his face seem fat, a joke that wears thin pretty quickly as far as I'm concerned. Pippin tells Fatty that all the cast have motives for stealing money from the manager but that all their alibis check out except Zoe's. So that Goon's got her and Boysie down as chief suspects. Cue more teasing of Goon by Fatty and his fat face. 'Now you clear-off!' Yelled Mr. Goon. 'Following me about like this! You with your fat face and all. You go and see a dentist. Gah! Think yourself funny following me about with that face.'

15. AT THE SHOW - AND AFTERWARDS

As for the last three chapters, this one concerns itself with the Monday morning, the checking up of alibis and the noon meeting in Pip's playroom to communicate what the various sub-sets of the Find-Outers have found out. The meeting ends with Fatty outlining how they will go about checking three more alibis on Tuesday. 'Larry and Daisy will go to see Mary Adams, to find out if Lucy White's alibi is sound - and Pip and I will see if we can test Peter Watting's and William Orr's. We shall have to find out how to check John James too - he went to the cinema all evening - or so he said.' This is a reminder to the reader. But it's also Enid reminding herself what she's got to do as the writer. She's keeping several plates spinning and that paragraph in itself is just enough to keep them in the air.

That Monday afternoon they go to the play. Show time is three o'clock. Boysie impresses them as an actor. Making Fatty wonder if he could be quite as silly as people said. After the show, Zoe invites the Find-Outers back-stage and the actors are described. The physical descriptions are important, because it will later be revealed that someone else stripped the cat suit from sleeping Boysie and put it on themselves. Alec Grant is given most space in the backstage scene. That he is an expert at impersonating women is emphasized. As is the fact that his signature is an illegible scrawl. Oddly, he throws the autographs books back at the Find-Outers.

16. THE PANTOMIME CAT HAS A TEA-PARTY

Boysie then makes his entrance. His cat skin has got a split in it, near the tail. Zoe puts this down to Boysie eating too much. Boysie is very nice to the children and gives a wooden lamb he has made to Bets, who hugs him. Zoe loves Boysie who loves Bets who loves Zoe. Enid intervenes at this point to say: 'Boysie was queer in the head and silly, he was ugly to look at - but he was kind and sincere and humble, he had sense of fun - and you simply couldn't help liking him.'

The Find-Outers stay for tea. Boysie reminds the group that he saw three of the children - Fatty, Larry and Pips but not Daisy or Bets - on the night of the robbery.

Fatty gets Boysie to go over the tea-making of that night in some detail and it's established that Boysie made tea for himself but went to sleep after he drank it and DID NOT take tea to the manager as he would normally have done. Surely Enid's conscious mind was aware by this time that someone had taken the cat-suit off the drugged Boysie and put it on himself or herself. And in doing so had stretched the fabric of the material. So it was unlikely to have been a slim person or a tall person (Boysie was small with a big head).

17. CHECKING UP THE ALIBIS

Enid begins this chapter by pretending that she thinks that Boysie did indeed take up tea to the manager and that he must be covering for someone. 'Fatty was very puzzled indeed.' They agree it couldn't have been super-nice Zoe and that they must check the other alibis as planned.

So the next day Larry and Daisy check out Lucy White's. She had indeed been sitting with an old lady from a quarter to six until half-past nine, without a break. So that was that. Meanwhile Fatty and Pip had gone to the place by the river where William Orr and Peter Watting were supposed to have had tea. Before investigating they decided to have a few snacks, at which point Goon enters. I should say here that Enid makes a mistake that was not picked up by herself when re-reading the typescript, nor by the copy editor at Methuen in 1949, and is still there in the latest paperback version I have, the 2003 edition whose cover kicks off this essay. That is, it's supposed to be Pip and Fatty that are checking out this alibi on Tuesday morning because Larry and Daisy are checking out Lucy White and the old lady. But after using the name Pip as the pair set off, Enid uses the name Larry thereafter.

18. MORE CHECKING - AND A FEW SNACKS

After some Goon teasing, Fatty, accompanied by Larry, interviews the serving girl. She confirms that Peter and William were there on the Friday. Peter had given her a book and they'd listened to Radio Theatre at seven o'clock. The radio had broken down but Peter had it repaired by twenty past eight - twenty minutes late for a program that her mother had wanted to listen to. In other words, there was plenty to back up the alibi of the pair both of whom had been described as tall and thin anyway, meaning they couldn't have got into the cat suit.

Fatty and Larry (still) then go on to the cinema where a cheeky receptionist is not helpful. Again they bump into Goon. Then Larry remembers that Pip's cook always goes to the cinema on Friday so they could ask her what had been showing. This Kitty tells them that He Loved Her So was the film and that it broke down four times while playing. So all they need to do is find out if their suspect noticed these breaks in the film.

The chapter ends with Fatty intending to phone Zoe that lunchtime to see if she knows where John James will be that afternoon. He suggests that they take Bets too.

'She'll be feeling left out if we don't.'

'Right said Larry. 'See you this afternoon.'

19. JOHN JAMES AND THE CINEMA

Zoe tells Fatty that John James is going for a picnic on the other side of the river in the afternoon. Fatty phones round the others, telling Pip to talk to Kitty again and make a note of exactly when the breaks in the film were. This seems a bit unnecessary, but at least it brings Pip back into the action. The Find-Outers plus Buster get the ferry over the river. They keep watch for John James and when he settles himself on the hillside they sit down close to him. John James asks if any of them have a match. Fatty gives him a box, telling him to keep it as he's not going to start smoking until he's 21! Conversation is brought round to the cinema, recent films, and John James tells them he was at the cinema on Friday and fell asleep during it. However, he was woken up four times by people chatting and so knew about the film repeatedly breaking down. In other words, his alibi checks out. And the Five like him. So that's him struck off the list of suspects.

20. DEFEAT - AND A BRAINWAVE

Fatty learns from Pippin that Boysie has confessed, claiming that he and Zoe did it together. This depresses Fatty. Larry has already suggested: "Come up at ten tomorrow and have a meeting." The meeting turns up to be at Pip's. All are gloomy. Eventually, Bets says something that very much needs saying: "It almost makes you think it must have been somebody else in Boysie's skin." Fatty immediately sees the possibilities in this and gets very excited. Soon Fatty is explaining the obvious, that one of the others stripped Boysie of his suit, put it on himself or herself, served the tea and did the robbery, before putting Boysie back into the cat suit, now a bit stretched. So now the mystery is simply who did that.

21. THE LAST ALIBI IS CHECKED

Up to now, the alibi of Alec Grant has not been checked as he went off to do his female impersonation show in Sheepridge that evening. The Find Outers decide that he was the only person small enough to have got in the suit in place of Boysie. John James for example, is too burly. The girls too small. This is hardly convincing as a piece of plotting as the cat suit was stretched and torn in the process of being used by the guilty party. If it had been a big person, Enid could have found a way round that, by re-examining the suit and finding stretch marks, for example.

Larry phones a friend of his in Sheepridge and speaks to his sister, who went to the show with her mother. She confirms the concert happened, that it was very good - you couldn't have told that it was a man - and that she got his autograph afterwards. This excites Fatty, who realizes that they have all the autographs already and can check out this autograph from Friday night. I imagine Fatty's excitement echoing Enid's when she realized that this had been set up for her. Either set up in advance by her under-mind, or set up in chapter 21 by her flexible imagination. Which?

An hour later, the Find-Outers are in Sheepridge interviewing this Julia. She confirms that she recognized the actor that night as having been Alec Grant. But when they look at the autograph from that night it's completely different from the autographs the real Alec Grant gave the Find-Outers.

So the case is solved. The chapter ends with Pippin telling the Find-Outers that Goon has arrested Boysie and Zoe and taken them over to the Inspector.

22. A SURPRISE FOR THE INSPECTOR

Things are set up for the Find-Outers to be correct in front of the inspector and Goon to be humiliated. And so it goes. Zoe is very supportive of Boysie and angry on his behalf. Alec is revealed to be cruel and selfish in that he was willing for Boysie and Zoe to take the wrap. Pippin tells the true story on behalf of Fatty and the Find-Outers. Inspector Jenks takes the written 'confession' that Goon obtained from Boysie, tears it into pieces and asks Goon to put the torn pieces into the fire behind him. And that's that.

The inspector invites the children, as well as Zoe and Boysie to lunch. Smiles all round. Zoe is grateful and happy. The only thing missing from the final scene is anything from Boysie.

== Characters ==
- Fatty - The chief of the Five Find-Outers
- Larry - The former chief of the Five Find-Outers
- Pip - A member of the Five Find-Outers
- Bets - The youngest member of the Five Find-Outers
- Daisy - A member of the Five Find-Outers
- Buster - A black Scottie dog owned by Fatty
- PC Pippin - A policeman who replaced Mr. Goon
- Mr. Goon - The local policeman
- Boysie Summers - The pantomime cat in the Dick Whittington skit
- Zoe Markham - Dick Whittington in the Dick Whittington skit
- Alec Grant - Dick's mother in the Dick's Whittington skit
- John James - The king in the Dick Whittington skit
- William Orr - The captain of Dick's ship in the Dick Whittington skit
- Peter Watting - Dick's master in the Dick Whittington skit
- Lucy White - Margot, who is Dick Whittington's sweetheart in the Dick Whittington skit
- Theatre Manager - The manager of the theatre where the skit is played
