= The Five Find-Outers =

Series of children's books by Enid Blyton

The Five Find-Outers and Dog
- Cover of The Mystery of the Disappearing Cat
- The Mystery of the Burnt Cottage; The Mystery of the Disappearing Cat; The Mystery of the Secret Room; The Mystery of the Spiteful Letters; The Mystery of the Missing Necklace; The Mystery of the Hidden House; The Mystery of the Pantomime Cat; The Mystery of the Invisible Thief; The Mystery of the Vanished Prince; The Mystery of the Strange Bundle; The Mystery of Holly Lane; The Mystery of Tally-Ho Cottage; The Mystery of the Missing Man; The Mystery of the Strange Messages; The Mystery of Banshee Towers
- Author: Enid Blyton
- Country: United Kingdom
- Genre: Children's literature, mystery, adventure
- Published: 1943–1961
- No. of books: 15

The Five Find-Outers and Dog, also known as The Five Find-Outers, is a series of children's mystery books written by Enid Blyton. The first was published in 1943 and the last in 1961. Set in the fictitious village of Peterswood based on Bourne End, close to Marlow, Buckinghamshire, the children Fatty (Frederick Trotteville), who is the leader of the team, Larry (Laurence Daykin), Pip (Philip Hilton), Daisy (Margaret Daykin), Bets (Elizabeth Hilton) and Buster, Fatty's dog, encounter a mystery almost every school holiday, always solving the puzzle before Mr Goon, the unpleasant village policeman, much to his annoyance.

== Characters ==
=== The Five Find-Outers and Dog ===
- Frederick Algernon "Fatty" Trotteville – the leader of the Five Find-Outers from the third book on, when he justifies his leadership by demonstrating how to use invisible ink and how to escape from a locked room. He is given the nickname Fatty by the other children because of his initials, Frederick Algernon Trotteville, F.A.T. and his stout build. Being an only child, he receives generous amounts of pocket money from his parents and wealthy relatives, but Fatty is always willing to share his money with the group, often buying rounds of cakes, drinks and ice-creams. Fatty also uses his pocket money to finance his interest in disguises and stores a large collection of clothes, wigs, greasepaint, cheek-pads, false teeth and other items in his shed at the bottom of the garden. Although boastful by nature, he learns to be more modest as his bragging causes the other children to become irritated. Fatty is a skilled orator and poet, and able to create poetry ad-lib. He is apparently top of his form at his boarding school and his ambition when he grows up is to become a detective. Fatty develops an interest in ventriloquism as the series progresses. Bets in particular adores Fatty and is very loyal to him. He is 12 at the start of the series and turns 13 just after Christmas.
- Laurence "Larry" Daykin – the eldest of the five and the original leader of the Five Find-Outers, passing the role to Fatty at the beginning of the third book. Larry is sometimes annoyed by Fatty's boasting. He is Daisy's older brother. He is the first character to be introduced in the series, but is developed considerably less than the other main characters as the series continues. As the oldest of the Five Find Outers, in the first story he is 13 years old. His birthday falls between Christmas and Easter.
- Margaret "Daisy" Daykin – Larry's younger sister. Creating the Five Find-Outers was Daisy's idea. She is particularly good at thinking of plans and ideas. She is younger than Larry by a year and the same age as Pip and Fatty, who are 12 as the series begins.
- Philip "Pip" Hilton – The same age as Daisy and a few years older than Bets, his younger sister whom he frequently teases. In contrast to Fatty's rather relaxed parents, Mr and Mrs Hilton are quite strict and often take a dim view of Pip and Bets's sleuthing activities, wishing that Pip especially would direct the same amount of energy into his schoolwork. In The Mystery of the Hidden House the Hiltons forbid Pip and Bets from getting involved in mysteries, but the children still find themselves in one. He is 12 at the beginning of the series, nearly 4 years older than his little sister. In later stories we learn that Pip's birthday falls early in January, while Bets' falls during the Autumn term.
- Elizabeth "Bets" Hilton – Pip's younger sister adores and hero-worships Fatty and he is very fond of her in return. Though the youngest, the kind-hearted Bets proves herself to be a worthy member. She is keenly observant, providing crucial ideas that help Fatty in solving some of the baffling mysteries - as in the 'Mystery of the Pantomime Cat' when she provides the breakthrough idea, to which Fatty exclaims: "Bets! Good, clever, brainy old Bets. She's got it! She's solved it! Bets, you deserve to be head of the Find-Outers! Oh my word, Bets, why, why, why didn't I think of it before?". She also thought of the name 'Five Find-Outers and Dog'. She is by far the youngest of the five, beginning the series at just 8 years of age, but is then the first to have a birthday- in the Autumn term between the 2nd and 3rd books of the series.
- Buster – Fatty's jet-black Scottish Terrier. He thinks the world of Fatty and his favourite pastime is to nip at Mr Goon's ankles. His favourite food is biscuits, spread with potted meat. Originally Larry, Pip, and Daisy only let Fatty join the detective club because of Buster.

=== Police force ===
- Theophilus Goon – The village policeman and Ern's uncle, who is outwitted by the five children in every single story. Mr Goon would dearly love promotion, but considers the children to be hindering him rather than helping. To chase them away he often tells them to "Clear Orf" (clear off). Consequently, the children have given him the nickname "Clear-Orf". Whenever he is upset or frustrated, Mr Goon constantly yells, "Gah!" causing much amusement among the children. In the second book, The Mystery of the Disappearing Cat, and for a long time after that, the children are known to arrange false clues for Mr Goon to mislead him so that they can solve the mystery first without having to put up with him interfering their investigations.
- Inspector Jenks – Also known as Chief Inspector and Superintendent – the head of the local police department. Because the Five are resented by Mr Goon, the children always telephone or meet the Inspector when they have solved a mystery. Over the course of the books he becomes a great friend of the children. Jenks is based on a real character from Blyton's home town who was promoted through the ranks of the police just as was his fictional counterpart. He becomes acquainted with the Five Find-Outers quite by chance in the first book of the series, The Mystery of the Burnt Cottage, while fishing. He admires the children, especially Fatty, much to the dismay of Mr. Goon, and clearly hints that he would like Fatty to become a policeman when he is grown up. He is also very fond of Bets who in turn looks forward to meeting him.
- P.C. Pippin – During The Mystery of the Pantomime Cat, P.C. Pippin takes over for a short time while Goon goes on a holiday and secretly helps the children to solve the mystery. Much to the delight of the children, P.C. Pippin is a nice man and dislikes Mr Goon extremely, who in turn hates him.
- P.C. Kenton – During the mystery of the Strange Bundle, P.C. Kenton is mentioned a few times and helps Mr.Goon to find an imaginary pig, dog and a man who wanted his auntie.
- P.C. Tonks – Appears at the beginning of The Mystery of the Invisible Thief while Goon is on a refresher course. He clearly states to Fatty that nothing could possibly take place in a quiet town like Peterswood.
- P.C. Johns – Appears in The Mystery of Tally Ho Cottage where he and Goon catch Fatty spying on Tally Ho Cottage in the middle of the night while also watching the house themselves. They are found in the morning by Ern locked in the boiler room.

=== Minor characters ===
- Ernest "Ern" Goon – Mr Goon's nephew. Ern is introduced in the book The Mystery of the Hidden House. Ern is a great lover of poetry, or "portry" as he calls it, though he never finished any poem (or 'pome' as he calls it) but Fatty can always finish it for him. That is one of the reasons that he is a great admirer of Fatty. Ern might be considered to be an unofficial seventh member of the group, although class distinctions are maintained, e.g. Ern is not permitted to eat dinner with the children but instead eats in the kitchen with the Cook. He is also seen in "The Mystery of the Vanished Prince", "The Mystery of Tally-Ho Cottage", "The Mystery of the Strange Messages" and "The Mystery of the Banshee Towers".
- Miss Trimble – Lady Candling's companion. The children call her Miss Tremble, because she is scared of everything. Her glasses often fall off and Bets loves to count how often this happens, much to Miss Trimble's annoyance. First appearing in The Mystery of the Disappearing Cat, she reappears in The Mystery of the Spiteful Letters, when the children question her about the regular passengers on the 10:15 Monday bus to Sheepsale. In The Mystery of the Hidden House, the children (save for Fatty) see her at the railway station but that is the last time she is mentioned.
- Miss Harmer – The person who takes care of the cats belonging to Lady Candling in The Mystery of the Disappearing Cat. She is very upset after the most valuable cat Dark Queen is stolen twice, both times she was away for the day. When the children are smelling the cat cage she asks them to leave because she feels unsafe about the cats since the second time Dark Queen is stolen. When the children need her key to the cage they play a trick on her so she leaves her coat out of sight and Pip takes the key out of her coat pocket.
- Gladys – Pip and Bets' maid in The Mystery of the Spiteful Letters. When she receives a spiteful, anonymous letter, she flees the house to live with her aunt. When the children track her down, she admits that she used to be a thief but is trying to forget her old life. At the end of the book, Mrs Hilton announces that Gladys is coming back. She is mentioned a few times in The Mystery of the Missing Necklace. It is unknown what happened to her, as by the beginning of The Mystery of the Hidden House, the Hiltons have a new maid, Lorna.
- Mr and Mrs Hilton – The parents of Pip and Bets, they are very strict and particular. In The Mystery of the Burnt Cottage, Mr Goon gets the Find-Outers into trouble by complaining to Mrs Hilton. Mrs Hilton is especially described as being "very strict about nice manners". He again complains to the Hiltons when the Find Outers send him a rude message written in secret ink in The Mystery of the Secret Room. Goon persuades the Hiltons not to tell the Find Outers anything about the anonymous letters in The Mystery of the Spiteful Letters. In The Mystery of the Hidden House, Mr and Mrs Hilton forbid Pip and Bets to get mixed up in any mysteries, due to a talk with Mr. Goon. However, despite their shortcomings, the Find Outers look up to and admire the Hiltons.
- Sid and Perce Goon – (short for Sidney and Percy) Ern's younger twin brothers. They appeared in The Mystery of the Vanished Prince when they went camping with Ern. Sid has an obsession for eating toffee but he soon switches to chewing gum later in the series (according to Ern). Ern also refers to them later about a modelling clay incident (when Sid mistakenly chews Perce's modelling clay as he thought it was chewing gum).
- Mrs Moon – Cook at the Hiltons during The Mystery of the Spiteful Letters.
- Hilary – God-daughter of Inspector Jenks, her home (Norton House) is burgled during The Mystery of the Invisible Thief.
- Luke – The gardener's help next door to Pip and Bets in The Mystery of the Disappearing Cat. Luke develops a close bond with the children, which is strained when he is the prime suspect both times the cat goes missing. It is revealed at the end of the book that Luke was set up to hide the real culprit. It is hinted that his friendship with the children will continue, although he has never appeared or even been mentioned since.
- Mrs. Trotteville – She is Fatty's mother and Fatty simply adores her. She is very lenient with him. Unlike the Hiltons she does not take Mr. Goon seriously and even considers him a nuisance. It is made out in the books that she enjoys going out with her husband for bridge parties. Though she does not like the children falling into adventure as she considers it dangerous, she does not interfere much and gives Fatty a lot of freedom and trust.
- The Postman – Appeared in several stories. The five always get some help from him.
- Liz and Glad – (Elizabeth Woosh and Gladys Woosh.) Ern Goon's cousins who appear in The Mystery Of Tally-Ho Cottage. They helped Ern spy on the Larkins.
- Bingo – (Ern's dog). Ern Goon's new dog Bingo makes an appearance in the last book, The Mystery of the Banshee Towers. Bingo is described as having a huge tail that "waves instead of wag" but small legs to match it. Like Fatty and Buster, Ern and Bingo simply adore each other a lot.

== Timeline ==
At the beginning of the series Larry is 13; Fatty, Pip, and Daisy are 12; while Bets is 8. Bets goes to day school, whereas all the others go to boarding school, which Bets really does not like because the others are friends at school and she only sees them at the holidays. The series takes place in successive school holidays, beginning with the Easter holidays and cycling through the summer and Christmas holidays. During each holiday the children solve a mystery – until The Mystery of the Invisible Thief (summer holidays), after which there is a break until the next summer holidays in which they solve "The Mystery of the Vanished Prince".

== Novels ==
The Mystery of the Missing Man (1956)

The 15 books in the series are:

- The Mystery of the Burnt Cottage (1943)
- The Mystery of the Disappearing Cat (1944)
- The Mystery of the Secret Room (1945)
- The Mystery of the Spiteful Letters (1946)
- The Mystery of the Missing Necklace (1947)
- The Mystery of the Hidden House (1948)
- The Mystery of the Pantomime Cat (1949)
- The Mystery of the Invisible Thief (1950)
- The Mystery of the Vanished Prince (1951)
- The Mystery of the Strange Bundle (1952)
- The Mystery of Holly Lane (1953)
- The Mystery of Tally-Ho Cottage (1954)
- The Mystery of the Missing Man (1956)
- The Mystery of the Strange Messages (1957)
- The Mystery of Banshee Towers (1961)
