= Phyllis Chase =

British illustrator

Phyllis Chase, married name Phyllis Samuel (c.1897 – c.1977), was an English illustrator.

== Career ==
A schoolfriend of Enid Blyton at St. Christopher's School in Beckenham, Chase and Blyton reunited several years after leaving school at a garden party in 1920 and began collaborating. She is best known for being the illustrator of Blyton initial books such as Child Whispers (1922) and Real Fairies: Poems, but illustrated many of Blyton's short stories which appeared in newspapers and magazines (such as those of publisher Cassell) throughout the 1920s. Chase also illustrated Blyton's Pinkity's Pranks and Other Nature Fairy Tales with A. E. Jackson and The Nursery Book (1927), among many others. She later married Felix Samuel in Sussex, who died in 1967. In 1975 Chase was interviewed on BBC Radio.
