= The Mystery of the Secret Room =

1945 book by Enid Blyton

- First edition cover
- Author: Enid Blyton
- Illustrator: Joseph Abbey
- Language: English
- Series: The Five Find-Outers
- Genre: Children's novel
- Publisher: Methuen
- Publication date: 1945
- Publication place: United Kingdom
- Preceded by: The Mystery of the Disappearing Cat
- Followed by: The Mystery of the Spiteful Letters

The Mystery of the Secret Room (1945) is the third in the Five Find-Outers series of children's mystery novels by Enid Blyton. Illustrated by Joseph Abbey, it was published by Methuen.

== Plot ==
Fatty is made the leader of the Five Find-Outers, after he explains that he has been studying how to get out of a locked room when the key is not on his side, to write letters with invisible ink (or orange/lemon juice) and has been practising disguises.

The group have fun with Fatty's new techniques, particularly disguises. Pip disguises himself with a wig and some false teeth and attracts the attention of Mr Goon, who chases him across the village. In an attempt to escape, Pip runs into the grounds of the semi-derelict Milton House and climbs a tree. He is surprised to see a fully furnished room at the top of the apparently abandoned house. The Find-Outers get to work to discover who owns Milton House and why there seems to be a secret room.

The children trace the owner of the house to a "John Henry Smith", who lives in a distant town. Fatty telephones him and alerts him to the fact that someone knows about the secret room. Expecting the mysterious Mr Smith to come to Peterswood and check out what is happening at Milton House, Fatty disguises himself with his wig and teeth and goes to the house at midnight. He manages to get inside and discovers a notebook written in code in the secret room. However, he is captured by the men (who are foreigners) and forced to write a letter to the other children, to trap them inside the house. Fatty writes a note but he also writes another one in invisible ink, warning the children and telling them to call the police. Bets notices that Fatty's note smells of oranges (orange juice was used as the secret ink) and they realise the danger and telephone their favourite policeman, Inspector Jenks. Meanwhile, Fatty escapes from a locked room and manages to meet Inspector Jenks outside the house and hand him the code book, after which the police round up the villains, who are international thieves.
