= Child Whispers =

Collection of 28 poems by Enid Blyton

First edition (publ. J Saville & Co.)

Child Whispers (published in 1922) is the first published work of the English children's author Enid Blyton, illustrated by her childhood friend and collaborator Phyllis Chase. It is a collection of 28 poems, and one of Blyton's most popular and best-known poetry books.
