= Kay Nixon =

English artist and book illustrator (1894–1988)

Kathleen Irene Blundell née Nixon who signed as Kay Nixon (13 August 1894 – 1988) was an English wildlife artist and illustrator of books including those of Enid Blyton. She also wrote and illustrated a series of books for children.

== Biography ==
Nixon was the youngest of nine children of Mary Eliza Bedington and George Stephen Nixon. She grew up at Woodside Park in London. An interest in wildlife came early and she studied at the Camden School of Art, receiving her teacher's certificate in 1911. Nixon then trained in book illustration at the Birmingham School of Art after which she worked as a commercial illustrator for 15 years, often collaborating with Dorothy Newsome-Glenn to illustrate magazines and books. During the First World War, the two worked at Armstrong Siddeley and after the War they illustrated Enid Blyton stories and an edition of Alice in Wonderland. Nixon also regularly exhibited paintings of birds and natural history subjects in Birmingham and Coventry at this time. In 1928 the Oxford University Press, OUP, commissioned the two to visit India and produce illustrations. Nixon went on to spend 26 years in India producing illustrations, including animal and bird posters, for the railways in India, the Bombay Natural History Society, horse portraits and a mural of wild duck. She also became an artist for the Times of India and the Bombay Weekly. Nixon met and married Victor Blundell while in India. The couple returned to England to live in Wilmslow, Cheshire and then Burwash, East Sussex. She continued to illustrate books and also wrote her own children's books with illustrations, based on the lives of her pets, a Siamese cat and a Dachshund puppy. Apart from sketches, Nixon also worked with oil, gouache, charcoal and watercolours. She won several awards for her work and was an elected member of the Society of Women Artists.

== Books illustrated ==
- Nature Stories published by Harrap (1922),
- The Sunny Stories series by Enid Blayton (1924–27),
- Bird Studies in India by Mary R.N. Holmer, published by OUP (1926),
- Sentinels of the Wild by M Batten (1938),
- Whispers of the Wilderness by M Batten (1960),
- Animal Mothers and Babies by Foran (1960),
- Bird Families by Maurice Burton, published by Frederick Warne & Co (1962).

== Books written and illustrated ==
- Pusti published by Frederick Warne & Co (1955),
- Pindi Poo, Warne & Co (1957),
- Poo and Pushti, Warne & Co (1959),
- The Bush Tail Family, Warne & Co (1963),
- Animal Legends, Warne & Co (1966),
- Strange Animal Friendships, Warne & Co (1967),
- Animals and Birds in Folklore Warne & Co (1969).
