= The Mystery of the Burnt Cottage =

1943 book by Enid Blyton

- First edition cover
- Author: Enid Blyton
- Illustrator: Joseph Abbey
- Series: The Five Find-Outers
- Published: 1943
- Publisher: Methuen
- Media type: Print
- Followed by: The Mystery of the Disappearing Cat

The Mystery of the Burnt Cottage is the first in the Five Find-Outers series of children's mystery novels by Enid Blyton. It was initially published in 1943 and continues to be frequently reissued.

== Plot summary ==
The novel centres on the mystery of who could have set fire to Mr Hick’s cottage. The five children, Larry and Daisy Daykin, Pip and Bets Hilton, and newcomer Frederick Algernon Trotteville (later nicknamed Fatty from his initials), meet at the scene of the fire and end up solving the mystery together.

Their suspects include an old tramp, a dismissed servant, a hostile colleague and the cook. They find certain clues including broken-down nettles in a ditch, a footprint in a grassy field and the presence of Hawker Tempest planes (which Mr Hick mentions "flew over" the other day).

The children realise that as Mr Hick claims to have been on the London train when the cottage was burnt, but by his own report saw the planes which flew over the village at the same time, he is contradicting himself. Fatty finds out that the cottage and the burnt papers Mr Hick describes as 'most important' were insured. The children deduce that he burnt his own cottage for the insurance money. The book also introduces Inspector Jenks, who helps the children and becomes a good friend of theirs.

== Supporting Characters ==
- Mr Hick - the owner of the house and the victim of the cottage fire
- Mrs Minns - the housekeeper of Mr Hick
- Mr Goon - the village policeman (nicknamed Clear-Orf by the children)
- Horace Peeks - a former employee of Mr Hick
- Mr Smellie - a scholar and former friend of Mr Hick
- Miss Miggle - a kind and gentle employee of Mr Smellie
- Hannah - the sister of Mrs Minns
- Lily - an employee of Mr Hick
- Inspector Jenks - a Police Inspector and friend of the Five Find-Outers
- Mrs Hilton - the strict mother of Pip and Bets
