= Teachers World =

British education magazine

Teachers World was a British publication of the first half of the 20th century which featured a range of teaching material, poems and short stories for children. It is most associated with Enid Blyton who contributed heavily to it in the 1920s and 1930s.
