= The Island of Adventure =

1944 children's book by Enid Blyton

- First edition
- Author: Enid Blyton
- Illustrator: Stuart Tresilian
- Language: English
- Series: The Adventure Series
- Genre: Adventure novel
- Publisher: Macmillan
- Publication date: September 1944
- Publication place: United Kingdom
- Media type: Print (hardcover and paperback)
- Followed by: The Castle of Adventure (1946)

The Island of Adventure (published in 1944) is a popular children's book by Enid Blyton. It is the first book in the Adventure Series. The first edition was illustrated by Stuart Tresilian.

== Plot summary ==
During school holidays, Jack, his sister Lucy-Ann, and their parrot Kiki go to stay with their new friends, Phillip and Dinah, in their isolated old house, "Craggy-Tops", set on a steep cliff on the coast. The house is owned by Phillip and Dinah's uncle Jocelyn (a focused historian) and overworked aunt Polly, who are helped by a handyman named Jo-Jo (Joe in some versions).

Jo-Jo warns the boys that, from their tower room in Craggy-Tops, they can occasionally see the dangerous Isle of Gloom, though it is usually shrouded in fog and mist. Soon the children meet Bill Smugs who shares Jack's fascination with birds. The children sail out to the Isle of Gloom and eventually learn that Jo-Jo is working with men who are counterfeiting money in the old mines on the island.

== Changes in new editions ==
Changes have been made to The Island of Adventure in newer editions of the book. These include:

- The title of the US edition of the book was changed to Mystery Island.
- The once handyman turned villain, Joe, was a black man named Jo-Jo in the original novel. His skin color is mentioned over 30 times. References to his ethnicity have been removed from some newer editions.

== Film adaptation ==
A film based on the book was released in the United Kingdom in 1982. It was directed by Anthony Squire and stars Norman Bowler as Bill, Wilfrid Brambell as Uncle Jocelyn and Eleanor Summerfield as Aunt Polly. There was also a New Zealand television series, in which the first episode is based on The Island of Adventure.

== Awards and accolades ==
The Boys Clubs of America gave this work a Junior Book Club Medal in 1947 under the title Mystery Island.
