= Thomas C. Hinkle =

American novelist

- Born: June 12, 1876; La Clede, Illinois
- Died: May 13, 1949 (aged 72); Wamego, Kansas
- Occupation: Writer (novelist)
- Spouse: Roxana E. Stevens (m. 1898)
- Children: 2
- Writing career
- Period: 20th century
- Genres: Juvenile fiction, western

Thomas Clark Hinkle (June 12, 1876 – May 13, 1949) was an American novelist.

== Biography ==
Thomas C. Hinkle was born in 1876 in La Clede, Illinois, to William R. and Sarilda Catherine Hinkle. He went to high school in Junction City, Kansas. In 1904 he graduated as a medical doctor from the University of Kansas. In 1908 he married Roxana E. Stevens and together they raised two children. He began writing in the 1920s in a mix of juvenile and western fiction. He specialized in writing stories about horses and dogs. Kirkus Review commented that Hinkle had an "overly sentimental view of horses and animals in general". His stories of horses are all about the American west, some based on true narratives but almost always with the theme 'wild horse can only be mastered by one man'.

== Works ==
- Doctor Rabbit And Ki-yi Coyote, (1918)
- Doctor Rabbit And Tom Wildcat, (1918)
- Doctor Rabbit And Brushtail The Fox, (1919)
- Doctor Rabbit And Grumpy Bear, (1919)
- How To Eat: A Cure For 'Nerves', (1921)
- Black Storm: A Horse of the Kansas Hills, (1929)
- Bugle: A Dog of the Rockies, (1929)
- Tornado Boy, (1930)
- Shag: The Story of a Dog, (1931)
- Silver: The Story of a Wild Horse, (1934)
- King: The Story of a Sheep Dog, (1936)
- Old Nick and Bob: Two Dogs of the West, William Morrow and Company, (1941)
- Tomahawk, Fighting Horse of the Old West, (1944)
- Buckskin, The Story of a Gallant Horse, (1949)
