= Stuart Tresilian =

British artist and illustrator

- Born: July 12, 1891
- Died: 1974 (aged 82–83)
- Known for: Children's book and magazine illustration

Jacket illustration for The Island of Adventure by Enid Blyton, 1944

Cecil Stuart Hazell Tresilian (Note: His birth was registered as "Cecil Stewart Hazell Tresilian" but he was baptised with the spelling "Stuart", and was known professionally as Stuart Tresilian. Steve Holland, Stuart Tresilan, Bear Alley, 26 February 2014) (1891-1974) was a British artist and illustrator, best known for his illustrations of children's books, including Rudyard Kipling's Animal Stories and All the Mowgli Stories, and Enid Blyton's Adventure Series.

He was born in Barton Regis, Gloucestershire, on 12 July 1891, and grew up in Islington, London, where his father worked as a colliery clerk. He became a professional vocalist, and later served in the Army Audit Department. He studied art at Regent Street Polytechnic, where he became a pupil teacher, and gained a scholarship to the Royal College of Art before the First World War. During the war he served with the Fifth London Regiment as a Second Lieutenant. He was wounded and captured in 1918, and held at Rastatt. The drawings he did during his incarceration are held at the Imperial War Museum.

He was repatriated at the end of 1918, and the following year married Sybil Alfreda Mayer in Kilburn, London. He returned to Regent Street Polytechnic as a teacher, his students including Charles Keeping. His teaching style was hands-off: Keeping recalled that he would give his illustration night class a theme, "then he'd go out and play snooker for the rest of the evening; to reappear just five minutes before the end of the session and put all the work on the board and do a brief criticism."

He was a prolific illustrator from the early 1930s to the late 1960s, working on magazines like The Wide World Magazine, Nash's Pall Mall Magazine, Zoo, The Passing Show, and Britannia and Eve, as well as numerous children's books for Macmillan, Cambridge University Press, Jonathan Cape, The Bodley Head and others. In 1961 he was co-author, with Herbert J. Williams, of Human Anatomy for Art Students.

He was a brother of the Art Workers Guild, being elected Master in 1960, and a member of the Society of Graphic Art, serving as its president from 1962 to 1965. He exhibited at the Royal Academy and the Royal Glasgow Institute of the Fine Arts, and had his first solo show, including his illustrations for Kipling's Mowgli Stories, drawings done in London Zoo, and photographs, in 1970 at Upper Grosvenor Galleries. He retired to Winslow, Buckinghamshire, where he died in the summer of 1974.
