= Enid Blyton Society =

British literary society

The Enid Blyton Society was formed in 1995 by collectors of Enid Blyton's work Norman Wright, Tony Summerfield and Michael Rouse. It was originally named the Enid Blyton Literary Society, to distinguish it from other organisations with similar aims, such as the Enid Blyton Book and Ephemera Collectors' Society, but was renamed after the latter's closure.

The call for material for the first Enid Blyton Society Journal, edited by Tony Summerfield, met with a response which allowed a 32-page magazine to be issued in 1996. The journal flourished, and now has full-colour covers with around ninety pages per issue becoming the norm.

Just as the journal flourished, so the 'Enid Blyton Day' is still going strong, with over a hundred in attendance at each event. Speakers at the Day have included Tim Rice and his daughter Eva, Gyles Brandreth, Marcus Harris, Gary Russell, Mary Cadogan, Sheila Ray, David Rudd, and Anne Digby.

Enid Blyton's daughters Gillian Baverstock and Imogen Smallwood, and biographer Barbara Stoney, became official patrons to the society in 2000.
