= Enid Blyton =

English children's writer (1897–1968)

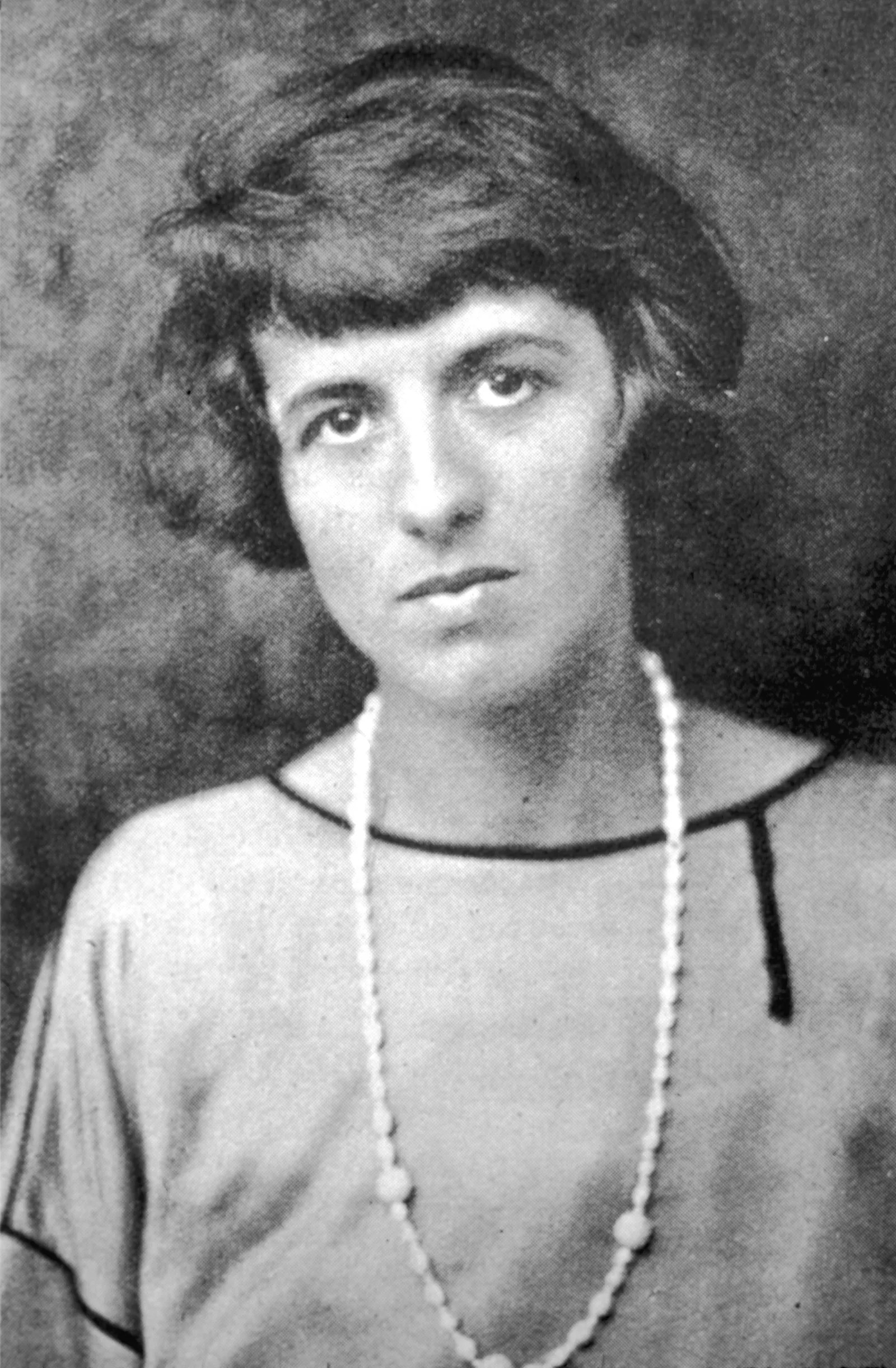
- Blyton c. 1923
- Born: 11 August 1897; London, England
- Died: 28 November 1968 (aged 71); London, England
- Resting place: Golders Green Crematorium
- Occupations: Novelist; poet; teacher; short story writer
- Spouses: Hugh Pollock (m. 1924; div. 1942) Kenneth Waters (m. 1943; died 1967)
- Children: 2, including Gillian Baverstock
- Relatives: Carey Blyton (nephew)
- Writing career
- Pen name: Mary Pollock
- Period: 1922–1968
- Genres: Children's literature: adventure; mystery; fantasy
- Notable works: Noddy; The Famous Five; The Secret Seven; The Adventure Series; Five Find-Outers; Malory Towers

Enid Mary Blyton (11 August 1897 – 28 November 1968) was an English children's writer. She remains one of the best-selling children's literature writers of all time. Blyton's books have been worldwide best-sellers since the 1930s, selling more than 600 million copies, and have been translated into ninety languages. As of June 2019, Blyton was the fourth-most translated author. She wrote on a wide range of topics, including education, natural history, fantasy, mystery, and biblical narratives. She is best remembered for her Noddy, The Famous Five, The Secret Seven, The Five Find-Outers, The Faraway Tree and Malory Towers books and wrote many others, including the St. Clare's and The Naughtiest Girl series.

Her first book, Child Whispers, a 24-page collection of poems, was published in 1922. Following the commercial success of her early novels, such as Adventures of the Wishing-Chair (1937) and The Enchanted Wood (1939), Blyton went on to build a literary empire, sometimes producing fifty books a year in addition to her prolific magazine and newspaper contributions. Her writing was unplanned and sprang largely from her unconscious mind; she typed her stories as events unfolded before her. The sheer volume of her work and the speed with which she produced it led to rumours that Blyton employed an army of ghost writers, a charge she vehemently denied.

Blyton's work became increasingly controversial among literary critics, teachers, and parents beginning in the 1950s due to the alleged unchallenging nature of her writing and her themes, particularly in the Noddy series. Some libraries and schools banned her works, and from the 1930s until the 1950s, the BBC refused to broadcast her stories because of their perceived lack of literary merit. Her books have been criticised as elitist, sexist, racist, xenophobic, and at odds with the more progressive environment that was emerging in post-World War II Britain, but updated versions of her books have continued to be popular since her death in 1968.

She felt she had a responsibility to provide her readers with a strong moral framework, so she encouraged them to support worthy causes. In particular, through the clubs she set up or supported, she encouraged and organised them to raise funds for animal and paediatric charities. The story of Blyton's life was dramatised in Enid, a BBC television film featuring Helena Bonham Carter in the title role. It was first broadcast in the U.K. on BBC Four in 2009.

== Early life and education ==
Enid Blyton was born on 11 August 1897 in East Dulwich, south London, United Kingdom, the only daughter and eldest of three children, to Thomas Carey Blyton, a cutlery salesman (recorded in the 1911 census with the occupation of "Mantle Manufacturer dealer [in] women's suits, skirts, etc.") and his wife Theresa Mary (née Harrison). Enid's younger brothers, Hanly and Carey, were born after the family had moved to a semi-detached house in Beckenham, then a village in Kent. A few months after her birth, Enid almost died from whooping cough but was nursed back to health by her father, whom she adored. Thomas Blyton ignited Enid's interest in nature; in her autobiography she wrote that he "loved flowers and birds and wild animals, and knew more about them than anyone I had ever met". He also passed on his interest in gardening, painting, music, literature, and theatre, and the pair often went on nature walks, much to the disapproval of Enid's mother, who showed little interest in her daughter's pursuits.

Enid was devastated when her father left the family shortly after her 13th birthday to live with another woman, with whom he had more children. Enid and her mother did not have a good relationship; in fact Enid despised her mother so much that after she left home, she never saw her mother again and she gave people the impression that her mother was dead. Enid did not attend either of her parents' funerals. From 1907 to 1915, Blyton attended St Christopher's School in Beckenham, where she enjoyed physical activities and became school tennis champion and lacrosse captain. She was not keen on all the academic subjects but excelled in writing and, in 1911, entered Arthur Mee's children's poetry competition. Mee offered to print her verses, encouraging her to produce more. Blyton's mother considered her efforts at writing to be a "waste of time and money", but she was encouraged to persevere by Mabel Attenborough, the aunt of school friend Mary Potter.

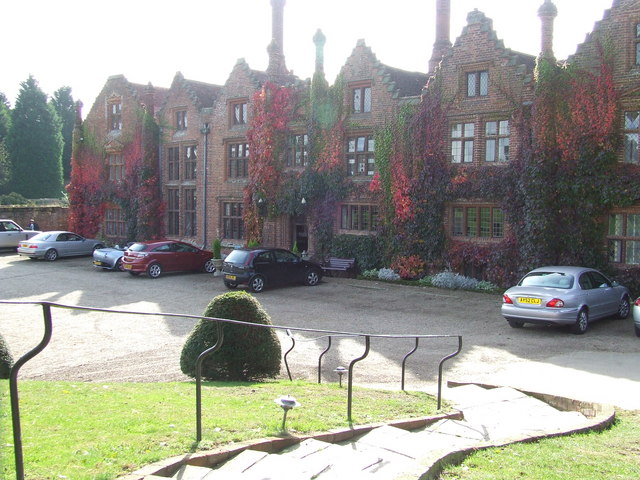
Seckford Hall in Woodbridge, Suffolk, was an inspiration to Blyton with its haunted room, secret passageway, and sprawling gardens.

Blyton's father taught her to play the piano, which she mastered well enough for him to believe she might follow in his sister May's footsteps and become a professional musician. Blyton considered enrolling at the Guildhall School of Music, but decided she was better suited to becoming a writer. After finishing school, in 1915, as head girl, she moved out of the family home to live with her friend Mary Attenborough, before going to stay with George and Emily Hunt at Seckford Hall, near Woodbridge, in Suffolk. Seckford Hall, with its allegedly haunted room and secret passageway, provided inspiration for her later writing. At Woodbridge Congregational Church, Blyton met Ida Hunt, who taught at Ipswich High School and suggested she train there as a teacher. Blyton was introduced to the children at the nursery school and, recognising her natural affinity with them, enrolled in a National Froebel Union teacher training course at the school in September 1916. By this time, she had nearly terminated all contact with her family.

Blyton's manuscripts were rejected by publishers on many occasions, which only made her more determined to succeed, saying, "It is partly the struggle that helps you so much, that gives you determination, character, self-reliance – all things that help in any profession or trade, and most certainly in writing." In March 1916, her first poems were published in Nash's Magazine. She completed her teacher training course in December 1918 and, the following month, obtained a teaching appointment at Bickley Park School, a small, independent establishment for boys in Bickley in Bromley, Kent. Two months later, Blyton received a teaching certificate with distinctions in zoology and principles of education; first class in botany, geography, practice and history of education, child hygiene, and classroom teaching; and second class in literature and elementary mathematics. In 1920, she moved to Southernhay, in Hook Road Surbiton, as nursery governess to the four sons of architect Horace Thompson and his wife Gertrude, with whom Blyton spent four happy years. With the shortage of area schools, neighbouring children soon joined her charges, and a small school developed at the house.

== Early writing career ==
In 1920, Blyton moved to Chessington in Surrey and began writing in her spare time. The following year, she won the Saturday Westminster Review writing competition with her essay "On the Popular Fallacy that to the Pure All Things Are Pure". Publications such as The Londoner, Home Weekly and The Bystander began to show an interest in her short stories and poems.

Child Whispers (1922)

Blyton's first book, Child Whispers, a 24-page collection of poems, was published in 1922. Its illustrator, Enid's schoolfriend Phyllis Chase collaborated on several of her early works. Also in that year, Blyton began writing in annuals for Cassell and George Newnes, and her first piece of writing, "Peronel and his Pot of Glue", was accepted for publication in Teachers' World. Further boosting her success, in 1923, her poems appeared alongside those of Rudyard Kipling, Walter de la Mare, and G. K. Chesterton in a special issue of Teachers' World. Blyton's educational texts were influential in the 1920s and 1930s, with her most sizable being the three-volume The Teacher's Treasury (1926), the six-volume Modern Teaching (1928), the eight-volume Pictorial Knowledge (1930), and the four-volume Modern Teaching in the Infant School (1932).

In July 1923, Blyton published Real Fairies, a collection of thirty-three poems written especially for the book with the exception of "Pretending", which had appeared earlier in Punch magazine. The following year, she published The Enid Blyton Book of Fairies, illustrated by Horace J. Knowles, and in 1926 the Book of Brownies. Several books of plays appeared in 1927, including A Book of Little Plays and The Play's the Thing with the illustrator Alfred Bestall.

In the 1930s, Blyton developed an interest in writing stories related to various myths, including those of ancient Greece and Rome; The Knights of the Round Table, Tales of Ancient Greece and Tales of Robin Hood were published in 1930. In Tales of Ancient Greece Blyton retold 16 well-known ancient Greek myths, but used Latin rather than Greek names and invented conversations between characters. The Adventures of Odysseus, Tales of the Ancient Greeks and Persians and Tales of the Romans followed in 1934.

== Commercial success ==
=== New series: 1934–1948 ===
The first of twenty-eight books in Blyton's Old Thatch series, The Talking Teapot and Other Tales, was published in 1934, the same year as Brer Rabbit Retold; (Brer Rabbit originally featured in Uncle Remus stories by Joel Chandler Harris), her first serial story and first full-length book, Adventures of the Wishing-Chair, followed in 1937. The Enchanted Wood, the first book in the Faraway Tree series, published in 1939, is about a magic tree inspired by the Norse mythology that had fascinated Blyton as a child. According to Blyton's daughter Gillian, the inspiration for the magic tree came from "thinking up a story one day, and suddenly she was walking in the enchanted wood and found the tree. In her imagination, she climbed up through the branches and met Moon-Face, Silky, the Saucepan Man and the rest of the characters. She had all she needed." As in the Wishing-Chair series, these fantasy books typically involve children being transported into a magical world in which they meet fairies, goblins, elves, pixies and other mythological creatures.

Blyton's first full-length adventure novel, The Secret Island, was published in 1938, featuring the characters of Jack, Mike, Peggy and Nora. Described by The Glasgow Herald as a "Robinson Crusoe-style adventure on an island in an English lake", The Secret Island was a lifelong favourite of Gillian's and spawned the Secret series. The following year Blyton released her first book in the Circus series and her initial book in the Amelia Jane series, Naughty Amelia Jane! According to Gillian, the main character was based on a large handmade doll given to her by her mother on her third birthday.

During the 1940s, Blyton became a prolific author, her success enhanced by her "marketing, publicity and branding that was far ahead of its time". In 1940, Blyton published two books – Three Boys and a Circus and Children of Kidillin – under the pseudonym of Mary Pollock (middle name plus first married name), in addition to the eleven published under her name that year. So popular were Pollock's books that one reviewer was prompted to observe that "Enid Blyton had better look to her laurels". But Blyton's readers were not so easily deceived and many complained about the subterfuge to her and her publisher, with the result that all six books published under the name of Mary Pollock – two in 1940 and four in 1943 – were reissued under Blyton's name. Later in 1940, Blyton published the first of her boarding school story books and the first novel in the Naughtiest Girl series, The Naughtiest Girl in the School, which followed the exploits of the mischievous schoolgirl Elizabeth Allen at the fictional Whyteleafe School. The first of her six novels in the St. Clare's series, The Twins at St. Clare's, appeared the following year, featuring the twin sisters Patricia and Isabel O'Sullivan.

In 1942, Blyton released the first book in the Mary Mouse series, Mary Mouse and the Dolls' House, about a mouse exiled from her mousehole who becomes a maid at a dolls' house. Twenty-three books in the series were produced between 1942 and 1964; 10,000 copies were sold in 1942 alone. The same year, Blyton published the first novel in the Famous Five series, Five on a Treasure Island, with illustrations by Eileen Soper. Its popularity resulted in twenty-one books between then and 1963, and the characters of Julian, Dick, Anne, George (Georgina) and Timmy the dog became household names in Britain. Matthew Grenby, author of Children's Literature, states that the five were involved with "unmasking hardened villains and solving serious crimes", although the novels were "hardly 'hard-boiled' thrillers". Blyton based the character of Georgina, a tomboy she described as "short-haired, freckled, sturdy, and snub-nosed" and "bold and daring, hot-tempered and loyal", on herself.

Blyton had an interest in biblical narratives and retold Old and New Testament stories. The Land of Far-Beyond (1942) is a Christian parable along the lines of John Bunyan's The Pilgrim's Progress (1698), with contemporary children as the main characters. In 1943, she published The Children's Life of Christ, a collection of fifty-nine short stories related to the life of Jesus, with her slant on popular biblical stories, from the Nativity and the Three Wise Men through to the trial, the crucifixion and the resurrection. Tales from the Bible was published the following year, followed by The Boy with the Loaves and Fishes in 1948.

Published in 1943, The Mystery of the Burnt Cottage launched the Five Find-Outers series. That same year saw the release of The Magic Faraway Tree, which later ranked 66th in the BBC's 2003 Big Read poll. Several of Blyton's works during this period have seaside themes; John Jolly by the Sea (1943), a picture book intended for younger readers, was published in a booklet format by Evans Brothers. Other books with a maritime theme include The Secret of Cliff Castle and Smuggler Ben, both attributed to Mary Pollock in 1943; The Island of Adventure, the first in the Adventure series of eight novels from 1944 onwards; and various novels of the Famous Five series such as Five on a Treasure Island (1942), Five on Kirrin Island Again (1947) and Five Go Down to the Sea (1953).

Capitalising on her success, with a loyal and ever-growing readership, Blyton produced a new edition of many of her series such as the Famous Five, the Five Find-Outers and St. Clare's every year in addition to many other novels, short stories and books. In 1946, Blyton launched the first in the Malory Towers series of six books based around the schoolgirl Darrell Rivers, First Term at Malory Towers, which became extremely popular, particularly with girls.

=== Peak output: 1949–1959 ===
The first book in Blyton's Barney Mysteries series, The Rockingdown Mystery, was published in 1949, as was the first of her fifteen novels in The Secret Seven series. The Secret Seven Society consists of Peter, his sister Janet, and their friends Colin, George, Jack, Pam and Barbara, who meet regularly in a shed in the garden to discuss peculiar events in their local community. Blyton rewrote the stories so they could be adapted into cartoons, which appeared in Mickey Mouse Weekly in 1951 with illustrations by George Brook. The French author Evelyne Lallemand continued the series in the 1970s, producing an additional twelve books, nine of which were translated into English by Anthea Bell between 1983 and 1987.

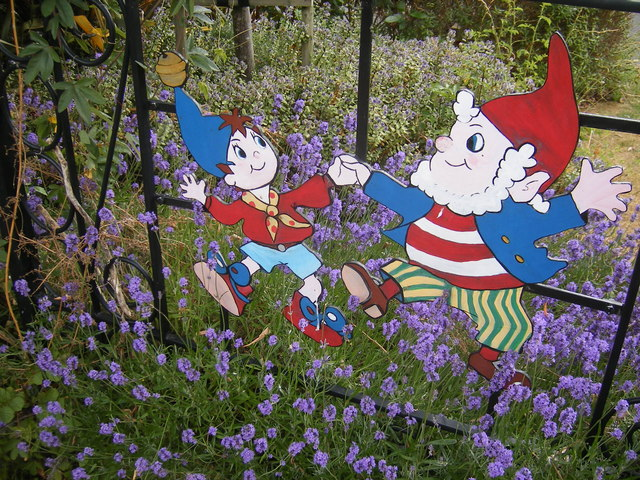
Blyton's characters Noddy and Big Ears

Blyton's Noddy, about a little wooden boy from Toyland, first appeared in the Sunday Graphic on 5 June 1949, and in November that year Noddy Goes to Toyland, the first of at least two dozen books in the series, was published. The idea was conceived by one of Blyton's publishers, Sampson, Low, Marston and Company, who in 1949 arranged a meeting between Blyton and the Dutch illustrator Harmsen van der Beek. Despite having to communicate via an interpreter, he provided some initial sketches of how Toyland and its characters would be represented. Four days after the meeting, Blyton sent the text of the first two Noddy books to her publisher, to be forwarded to van der Beek. The Noddy books became one of her most successful and best-known series, and were hugely popular in the 1950s. An extensive range of sub-series, spin-offs and strip books was produced throughout the decade, including Noddy's Library, Noddy's Garage of Books, Noddy's Castle of Books, Noddy's Toy Station of Books and Noddy's Shop of Books.

In 1950, Blyton established the company Darrell Waters Ltd to manage her affairs. By the early 1950s, she had reached the peak of her output, often publishing more than fifty books a year, and she remained extremely prolific throughout much of the decade. By 1955, Blyton had written her fourteenth Famous Five novel, Five Have Plenty of Fun, her fifteenth Mary Mouse book, Mary Mouse in Nursery Rhyme Land, her eighth book in the Adventure series, The River of Adventure, and her seventh Secret Seven novel, Secret Seven Win Through. She completed the sixth and final book of the Malory Towers series, Last Term at Malory Towers, in 1951.

Blyton published several further books featuring the character of Scamp the terrier, following on from The Adventures of Scamp, a novel she had released in 1943 under the nom de plume of Mary Pollock. Scamp Goes on Holiday (1952) and Scamp and Bimbo, Scamp at School, Scamp and Caroline and Scamp Goes to the Zoo (1954) were illustrated by Pierre Probst. She introduced the character of Bom, a stylish toy drummer dressed in a bright red coat and helmet, alongside Noddy in TV Comic in July 1956. A book series began the same year with Bom the Little Toy Drummer, featuring illustrations by R. Paul-Hoye, and followed with Bom and His Magic Drumstick (1957), Bom Goes Adventuring and Bom Goes to Ho Ho Village (1958), Bom and the Clown and Bom and the Rainbow (1959) and Bom Goes to Magic Town (1960). In 1958, she produced two annuals featuring the character, the first of which included twenty short stories, poems and picture strips.

=== Final works ===
Many of Blyton's series, including Noddy and The Famous Five, continued to be successful in the 1960s; by 1962, 26 million copies of Noddy had been sold. (Note: In 1960 alone, eleven Noddy books were published, including the strip books Noddy and the Runaway Wheel, Noddy's Bag of Money, and Noddy's Car Gets into Trouble.) Blyton concluded several of her long-running series in 1963, publishing the last books of The Famous Five (Five Are Together Again) and The Secret Seven (Fun for the Secret Seven); she also produced three more Brer Rabbit books with the illustrator Grace Lodge: Brer Rabbit Again, Brer Rabbit Book, and Brer Rabbit's a Rascal. In 1962, many of her books were among the first to be published by Armada Books in paperback, making them more affordable to children.

After 1963, Blyton's output was generally confined to short stories and books intended for very young readers, such as Learn to Count with Noddy and Learn to Tell Time with Noddy in 1965, and Stories for Bedtime and the Sunshine Picture Story Book collection in 1966. Her declining health and a falling off in readership among older children have been put forward as the principal reasons for this change in trend. Blyton published her last book in the Noddy series, Noddy and the Aeroplane, in February 1964. In May of the following year, she published Mixed Bag, a songbook with music written by her nephew Carey, and in August she released her last full-length books, The Man Who Stopped to Help and The Boy Who Came Back.

== Magazine and newspaper contributions ==
Blyton cemented her reputation as a children's writer when in 1926 she took over the editing of Sunny Stories, a magazine that typically included the re-telling of legends, myths, stories and other articles for children. That same year, she was given her own column in Teachers' World, entitled "From my Window". Three years later, she began contributing a weekly page in the magazine, in which she published letters from her Fox Terrier dog Bobs. They proved to be so popular that in 1933 they were published in book form as Letters from Bobs, and sold ten thousand copies in the first week. Her most popular feature was "Round the Year with Enid Blyton", which consisted of forty-eight articles covering aspects of natural history such as weather, pond life, how to plant a school garden and how to make a bird table. Among Blyton's other nature projects was her monthly "Country Letter" feature that appeared in The Nature Lover magazine in 1935.

Sunny Stories was renamed Enid Blyton's Sunny Stories in January 1937, and served as a vehicle for the serialisation of Blyton's books. Her first Naughty Amelia Jane story, about an anti-heroine based on a doll owned by her daughter Gillian, was published in the magazine. Blyton stopped contributing in 1952, and it closed down the following year, shortly before the appearance of the new fortnightly Enid Blyton Magazine written entirely by Blyton. The first edition appeared on 18 March 1953, and the magazine ran until September 1959.

Noddy made his first appearance in the Sunday Graphic in 1949, the same year as Blyton's first daily Noddy strip for the London Evening Standard. It was illustrated by van der Beek until his death in 1953.

== Writing style and technique ==
Blyton worked in a wide range of fictional genres, from fairy tales to animal, nature, detective, mystery, and circus stories, but she often "blurred the boundaries" in her books, and encompassed a range of genres even in her short stories. In a 1958 article published in The Author, she wrote that there were a "dozen or more different types of stories for children", and she had tried them all, but her favourites were those with a family at their centre.

In a letter to the psychologist Peter McKellar, (Note: McKellar had written to Blyton in February 1953 asking for the imagery techniques she employed in her writing, for a research project he had undertaken. The results of his investigation were published in Imagination and Thinking (1957).) Blyton describes her writing technique:

I shut my eyes for a few minutes, with my portable typewriter on my knee – I make my mind a blank and wait – and then, as clearly as I would see real children, my characters stand before me in my mind's eye ... The first sentence comes straight into my mind, I don't have to think of it – I don't have to think of anything.

In another letter to McKellar, she describes how in just five days she wrote the 60,000-word book The River of Adventure, the eighth in her Adventure Series, by listening to what she referred to as her "under-mind", which she contrasted with her "upper conscious mind". Blyton was unwilling to conduct any research or planning before beginning work on a new book, which—coupled with the lack of variety in her life, (Note: In her leisure time Blyton led the life of a typical suburban housewife, gardening, and playing golf or bridge. She rarely left England, preferring to holiday by the English coast, almost invariably in Dorset, where she and her husband took over the lease of an 18-hole golf course at Studland Bay in 1951.) according to Druce—almost inevitably presented the danger that she might unconsciously, and did, plagiarise the books she had read, including her own. Gillian has recalled that her mother "never knew where her stories came from", but that she used to talk about them "coming from her 'mind's eye'", as did William Wordsworth and Charles Dickens. Blyton had "thought it was made up of every experience she'd ever had, everything she's seen or heard or read, much of which had long disappeared from her conscious memory" but never knew the direction her stories would take. Blyton further explained in her biography that "If I tried to think out or invent the whole book, I could not do it. For one thing, it would bore me and for another, it would lack the 'verve' and the extraordinary touches and surprising ideas that flood out from my imagination."

Blyton's daily routine varied little over the years. She usually began writing soon after breakfast, with her portable typewriter on her knee and her favourite red Moroccan shawl nearby; she believed that the colour red acted as a "mental stimulus" for her. Stopping only for a short lunch break, she continued writing until five o'clock, by which time she would usually have produced 6,000 to 10,000 words.

An article in The Malay Mail published in 2000 considers Blyton's children to have "lived in a world shaped by the realities of post-war austerity", enjoying freedom without political correctness, which serves modern readers of Blyton's novels with a form of escapism. Brandon Robshaw of The Independent refers to the Blyton universe as "crammed with colour and character", "self-contained and internally consistent", noting that Blyton exemplifies a strong mistrust of adults and figures of authority in her works, creating a world in which children govern. Gillian noted that in her mother's adventure, detective and school stories for older children, "the hook is the strong storyline with plenty of cliffhangers, a trick she acquired from her years of writing serialised stories for children's magazines. There is always a strong moral framework in which bravery and loyalty are (eventually) rewarded". Blyton herself wrote that "my love of children is the whole foundation of all my work".

Victor Watson, assistant director of Research at Homerton College, Cambridge, believes that Blyton's works reveal an "essential longing and potential associated with childhood", and notes how the opening pages of The Mountain of Adventure present a "deeply appealing ideal of childhood". He argues that Blyton's work differs from that of many other authors in its approach, describing the narrative of The Famous Five series for instance as "like a powerful spotlight, it seeks to illuminate, to explain, to demystify. It takes its readers on a roller-coaster story in which the darkness is always banished; everything puzzling, arbitrary, evocative is either dismissed or explained". Watson further notes how Blyton often used minimalist visual descriptions and introduced a few careless phrases such as "gleamed enchantingly" to appeal to her young readers.

From the mid-1950s, rumours began to circulate that Blyton had not written all the books attributed to her, a charge she found particularly distressing. She published an appeal in her magazine asking children to let her know if they heard such stories and after one mother informed her that she had attended a parents' meeting at her daughter's school, during which a young librarian had repeated the allegation, Blyton decided in 1955 to begin legal proceedings. The librarian was eventually forced to make a public apology in open court early the following year, but the rumours that Blyton operated "a 'company' of ghostwriters" persisted, as some found it difficult to believe that one woman working alone could produce such a volume of work.

== Charitable work ==
Blyton felt a responsibility to provide her readers with a positive moral framework, and she encouraged them to support worthy causes. Her view, expressed in a 1957 article, was that children should help animals and other children rather than adults:

[children] are not interested in helping adults; indeed, they think that adults themselves should tackle adult needs. But they are intensely interested in animals and other children and feel compassion for the blind boys and girls, and for the spastics who are unable to walk or talk.

Blyton and the members of the children's clubs she promoted via her magazines raised a great deal of money for various charities; according to Blyton, membership of her clubs meant "working for others, for no reward". The largest of the clubs she was involved with was the Busy Bees, the junior section of the People's Dispensary for Sick Animals, which Blyton had actively supported since 1933. The club had been set up by Maria Dickin in 1934, and after Blyton publicised its existence in the Enid Blyton Magazine, it attracted 100,000 members in three years. Such was Blyton's popularity among children that after she became Queen Bee in 1952, more than 20,000 additional members were recruited in her first year in office. The Enid Blyton Magazine Club was formed in 1953. Its primary objective was to raise funds to help those children with cerebral palsy who attended a centre in Cheyne Walk, in Chelsea, London, by furnishing an on-site hostel among other things.

The Famous Five series gathered such a following that readers asked Blyton if they might form a fan club. She agreed, on condition that it serves a useful purpose, and suggested that it could raise funds for the Shaftesbury Society Babies' Home (Note: Despite its name, the society provided accommodation for pre-school infants in need of special care.) in Beaconsfield, on whose committee she had served since 1948. The club was established in 1952, and provided funds for equipping a Famous Five Ward at the home, a paddling pool, sun room, summer house, playground, birthday and Christmas celebrations, and visits to the pantomime. By the late 1950s, Blyton's clubs had a membership of 500,000, and raised £35,000 (roughly equivalent to £758,000 in 2025) in the six years of the Enid Blyton Magazine's run.

By 1974, the Famous Five Club had a membership of 220,000 and was growing at the rate of 6,000 new members a year. (Note: The Famous Five Club was run by the publisher of Blyton's Famous Five series.) The Beaconsfield home that was set up to support was closed in 1967, but the club continued to raise funds for other paediatric charities, including an Enid Blyton bed at Great Ormond Street Hospital and a mini-bus for disabled children at Stoke Mandeville Hospital.

== Jigsaw puzzle and games ==
Blyton capitalised upon her commercial success as an author by negotiating agreements with jigsaw puzzle and games manufacturers from the late 1940s onwards; by the early 1960s, some 146 different companies were involved in merchandising Noddy alone. In 1948, Bestime released four jigsaw puzzles featuring her characters, and the first Enid Blyton board game appeared, Journey Through Fairyland, created by BGL. The first card game, Faraway Tree, appeared from Pepys in 1950. In 1954, Bestime released the first four jigsaw puzzles of the Secret Seven, and the following year a Secret Seven card game appeared.

Bestime released the Little Noddy Car Game in 1953 and the Little Noddy Leap Frog Game in 1955, and in 1956 American manufacturer Parker Brothers released Little Noddy's Taxi Game, a board game which features Noddy driving about town, picking up various characters. Bestime released its Plywood Noddy Jigsaws series in 1957 and a Noddy jigsaw series featuring cards appeared from 1963, with illustrations by Robert Lee. Arrow Games became the chief producer of Noddy jigsaws in the late 1970s and early 1980s. Whitman manufactured four new Secret Seven jigsaw puzzles in 1975 and produced four new Malory Towers ones two years later. In 1979, the company released a Famous Five adventure board game, the Famous Five Kirrin Island Treasure. Stephen Thraves wrote eight Famous Five adventure game books, published by Hodder & Stoughton in the 1980s. The first adventure game book of the series, The Wreckers' Tower Game, was published in October 1984.

== Personal life ==
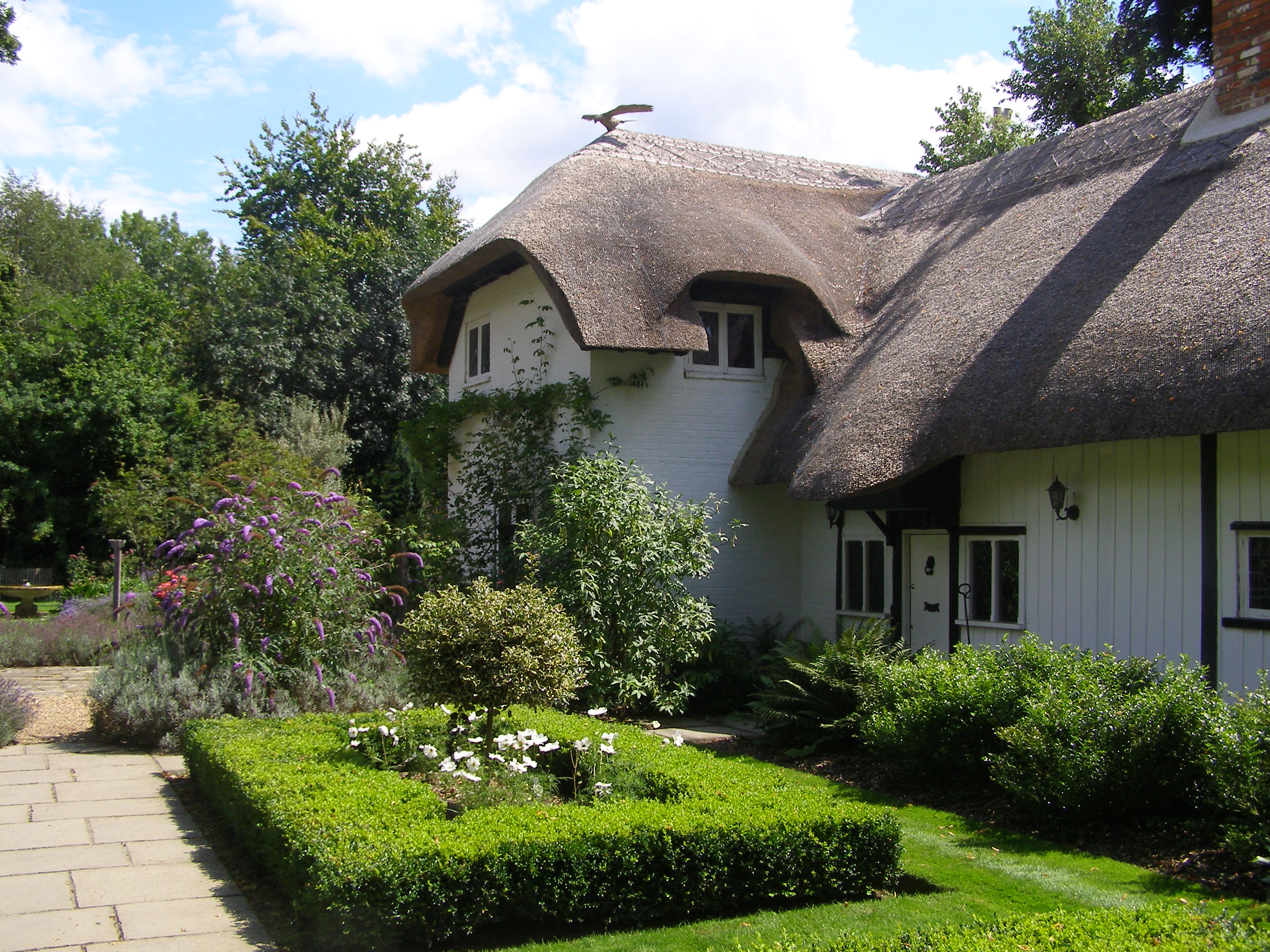
Blyton's home "Old Thatch" near Bourne End, Buckinghamshire, where she lived from 1929 to 1938

On 28 August 1924, Blyton married Major Hugh Alexander Pollock at Bromley Register Office, without inviting her family. They married shortly after his divorce from his first wife, with whom he had two sons, one of them already deceased. Pollock was an editor of the book department in the publishing firm George Newnes, which became Blyton's regular publisher. It was he who requested her to write a book about animals, resulting in The Zoo Book, completed in the month before their marriage. They initially lived in a flat in Chelsea before moving to Elfin Cottage in Beckenham in 1926, and then to Old Thatch in Bourne End (called Peterswood in her books) in 1929. Blyton's first daughter, Gillian, was born on 15 July 1931, and after a miscarriage in 1934, she gave birth to a second daughter, Imogen, on 27 October 1935.

In 1938, she and her family moved to a house in Beaconsfield, named Green Hedges by Blyton's readers, following a competition in her magazine. By the mid-1930s, Pollock had become a secret alcoholic, withdrawing increasingly from public life—possibly triggered through his meetings, as a publisher, with Winston Churchill, which may have reawakened the trauma Pollock suffered during World War I. With the outbreak of World War II, he became involved in the Home Guard and also re-encountered Ida Crowe, an aspiring writer nineteen years his junior, whom he had first met years earlier. He made her an offer to join him as a secretary in his posting to a Home Guard training centre at Denbies, a Gothic mansion in Surrey belonging to Lord Ashcombe, and they began a romantic relationship.

Blyton's marriage to Pollock was troubled for years, and according to Crowe's memoir, she had a series of affairs, including with one of the children's nannies and with Lola Onslow, an artist who illustrated Blyton's 1924 book, titled The Enid Blyton Book of Fairies. In 1941, Blyton met Kenneth Fraser Darrell Waters, a London surgeon with whom she began a serious affair. Pollock discovered the liaison and threatened to initiate divorce proceedings. Due to fears that exposure of her adultery would ruin her public image, it was ultimately agreed that Blyton would instead file for divorce against Pollock. According to Crowe's memoir, Blyton promised that if he admitted to infidelity, she would allow him parental access to their daughters; but after the divorce, he was denied contact with them, and Blyton made sure he was subsequently unable to find work in publishing. Pollock, having married Crowe on 26 October 1943, eventually resumed his heavy drinking and was forced to petition for bankruptcy in 1950.

Blyton and Darrell Waters married at the City of Westminster Register Office on 20 October 1943. She changed the surname of her daughters to Darrell Waters and publicly embraced her new role as a happily married and devoted doctor's wife. After discovering she was pregnant in the spring of 1945, Blyton miscarried five months later, following a fall from a ladder. The baby would have been Darrell Waters's first child and the son for which they both longed.

Blyton's health began to deteriorate in 1957, when, during a round of golf, she started to feel faint and breathless, and, by 1960, she was displaying signs of dementia. Her agent, George Greenfield, recalled that it was "unthinkable" for the "most famous and successful of children's authors with her enormous energy and computerlike memory" to be suffering from what is now known as Alzheimer's disease in her mid-60s. Worsening Blyton's situation was her husband's declining health throughout the 1960s; he suffered from severe arthritis in his neck and hips, deafness, and became increasingly ill-tempered and erratic until his death on 15 September 1967.

The story of Blyton's life was dramatised in a BBC film entitled Enid, which aired in the United Kingdom on BBC Four on 16 November 2009. Helena Bonham Carter, who played the title role, described Blyton as "a complete workaholic, an achievement junkie and an extremely canny businesswoman" who "knew how to brand herself, right down to the famous signature".

== Death and legacy ==
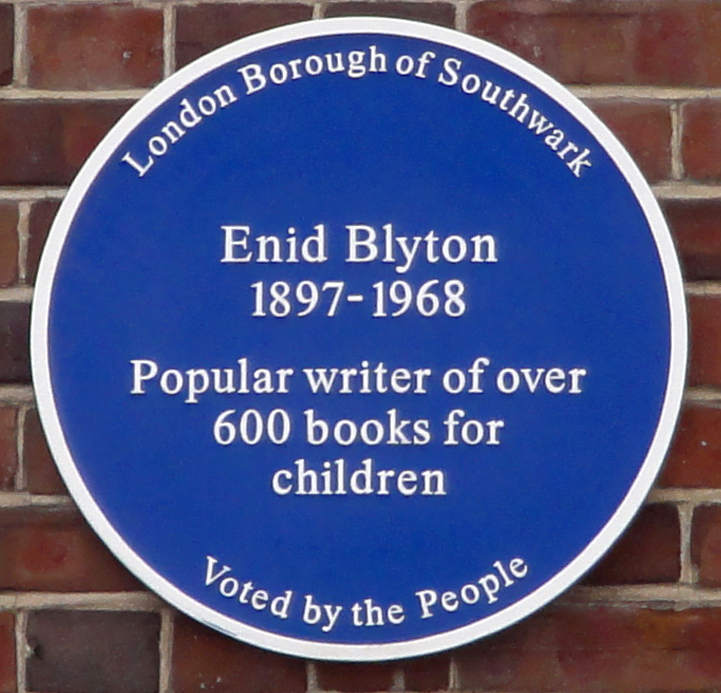
Blue plaque on Blyton's childhood home in Ondine Road, East Dulwich, South London

During the months following her husband's death, Blyton became increasingly ill and moved into a nursing home three months before her death. She died in her sleep of Alzheimer's disease at the Greenways Nursing Home, Hampstead, north London, on 28 November 1968, aged 71. A memorial service was held at St James's Church, Piccadilly, and she was cremated at Golders Green Crematorium, where her ashes remain. Blyton's home, Green Hedges, was auctioned on 26 May 1971 and demolished in 1973; the site is now occupied by houses and a street named Blyton Close. A blue plaque commemorates Blyton at Hook Road in Chessington, where she lived from 1920 to 1924. In 2014, a plaque recording her time as a Beaconsfield resident from 1938 until her death in 1968 was unveiled in the town hall gardens, next to small iron figures of Noddy and Big Ears.

Since her death and the publication of her daughter Imogen's 1989 autobiography, A Childhood at Green Hedges, Blyton's legacy has remained divisive amongst her family. Imogen considered her mother to be "arrogant, insecure, pretentious, very skilled at putting difficult or unpleasant things out of her mind, and without a trace of maternal instinct. As a child, I viewed her as a rather strict authority. As an adult I pitied her." Blyton's eldest daughter Gillian remembered her rather differently, however, as "a fair and loving mother, and a fascinating companion".

The Enid Blyton Trust for Children was established in 1982, with Imogen as its first chairman, and in 1985 it established the National Library for the Handicapped Child. Enid Blyton's Adventure Magazine began publication in September 1985, and on 14 October 1992, the BBC began publishing Noddy Magazine and released the Noddy CD-Rom in October 1996.

The first Enid Blyton Day was held at Rickmansworth on 6 March 1993, and in October 1996, the Enid Blyton award, The Enid, was given to those who have made outstanding contributions towards children. The Enid Blyton Society was formed in early 1995, to provide "a focal point for collectors and enthusiasts of Enid Blyton" through its thrice-annual Enid Blyton Society Journal, its annual Enid Blyton Day and its website. On 16 December 1996, Channel 4 broadcast a documentary about Blyton, Secret Lives. To celebrate her centenary in 1997, exhibitions were put on at the London Toy & Model Museum (now closed), Hereford and Worcester County Museum and Bromley Library, and on 9 September the Royal Mail issued centenary stamps.

The London-based entertainment and retail company, Trocadero PLC, purchased Blyton's Darrell Waters Ltd in 1995 for £14.6 million and established a subsidiary, Enid Blyton Ltd, to handle all intellectual properties, character brands and media in Blyton's works. The group changed its name to Chorion in 1998, but after financial difficulties in 2012, sold its assets. Hachette UK acquired from Chorion world rights in the Blyton estate in March 2013, including The Famous Five series but excluding the rights to Noddy, which had been sold to DreamWorks Classics (formerly Classic Media, now a subsidiary of DreamWorks Animation) in 2012.

Blyton's granddaughter, Sophie Smallwood, wrote a new Noddy book to celebrate the character's 60th birthday, 46 years after the last book was published; Noddy and the Farmyard Muddle (2009) was illustrated by Robert Tyndall. In February 2011, the manuscript of a previously unknown Blyton novel, Mr Tumpy's Caravan, was discovered by the archivist at Seven Stories, National Centre for Children's Books in a collection of papers belonging to Blyton's daughter Gillian, purchased by Seven Stories in 2010 following her death. It was initially thought to belong to a comic strip collection of the same name published in 1949, but it appears to be unrelated and is believed to be something written in the 1930s, which had been rejected by a publisher.

In a 1982 survey of 10,000 eleven-year-old children, Blyton was voted their most popular writer. She is the world's fourth-most-translated author, behind Agatha Christie, Jules Verne and William Shakespeare, with her books being translated into 90 languages. From 2000 to 2010, Blyton was listed as a top-ten author, selling almost 8 million copies (worth £31.2 million) in the UK alone. In 2003, The Magic Faraway Tree was voted 66th in the BBC's Big Read, a year-long survey of the UK's best-loved novels. In a 2008 poll conducted by the Costa Book Awards, Blyton was voted the UK's best-loved author ahead of Roald Dahl, J. K. Rowling, Jane Austen and Shakespeare. Her books continue to be very popular among children in Commonwealth nations such as India, Pakistan, Sri Lanka, Singapore, Malta, New Zealand and Australia, and around the world. They have also seen a surge of popularity in China, where they are "big with every generation". In March 2004, Chorion and the Chinese publisher Foreign Language Teaching and Research Press negotiated an agreement over the Noddy franchise, which included bringing the character to an animated series on television, with a potential audience of a further 95 million children under the age of five. Chorion spent around £10 million digitising Noddy and, as of 2002, had made television agreements with at least 11 countries worldwide.

Novelists influenced by Blyton include the crime writer Denise Danks, whose fictional detective Georgina Powers is based on George from the Famous Five. Peter Hunt's A Step off the Path (1985) is also influenced by the Famous Five, and the St. Clare's and Malory Towers series inspired Jacqueline Wilson's Double Act (1996) and Adèle Geras's Egerton Hall trilogy (1990–92) respectively. Blyton was important to Stieg Larsson. "The series Stieg Larsson most often mentioned were the Famous Five and the Adventure books".

== Critical backlash ==
A. H. Thompson, who compiled an extensive overview of censorship efforts in the United Kingdom's public libraries, dedicated an entire chapter to "The Enid Blyton Affair", and wrote of her in 1975:

No single author has caused more controversy among librarians, literary critics, teachers, and other educationalists and parents during the last thirty years, than Enid Blyton. How is it that the books of this tremendously popular writer for children should have given rise to accusations of censorship against librarians in Australia, New Zealand, and the United Kingdom?

Blyton's range of plots and settings has been described as limited, repetitive and continually recycled. Many of her books were critically assessed by teachers and librarians, deemed unfit for children to read, and removed from syllabi and public libraries. Responding to claims that her moral views were "dependably predictable", Blyton commented that "most of you could write down perfectly correctly all the things that I believe in and stand for – you have found them in my books, and a writer's books are always a faithful reflection of himself".

From the 1930s to the 1950s, the BBC operated a de facto ban on dramatising Blyton's books for radio, considering her to be a "second-rater" whose work was without literary merit. (Note: Blyton submitted her first proposal to the BBC in 1936.) The children's literary critic, Margery Fisher, likened Blyton's books to "slow poison", and Jean E. Sutcliffe of the BBC's schools broadcast department wrote of Blyton's ability to churn out "mediocre material", noting that "her capacity to do so amounts to genius ... anyone else would have died of boredom long ago". Michael Rosen, Children's Laureate from 2007 until 2009, wrote that "I find myself flinching at occasional bursts of snobbery and the assumed level of privilege of the children and families in the books". The children's author Anne Fine presented an overview of the concerns about Blyton's work and responses to them on BBC Radio 4 in November 2008, in which she noted the "drip, drip, drip of disapproval" associated with the books. Blyton's response to her critics was that she was uninterested in the views of anyone over the age of 12, stating that half the attacks on her work were motivated by jealousy and the rest came from "stupid people who don't know what they're talking about because they've never read any of my books".

Despite criticism by contemporaries that her work's quality began to suffer in the 1950s at the expense of its increasing volume, Blyton nevertheless capitalised on being generally regarded at the time as "a more 'savoury', English alternative" to what some considered an "invasion" of Britain by American culture, in the form of "rock music, horror comics, television, teenage culture, delinquency, and Disney".

According to Nicholas Tucker, the works of Enid Blyton have been "banned from more public libraries over the years than is the case with any other adult or children's author", though such attempts to quell the popularity of her books over the years seem to have been largely unsuccessful, and "she still remains very widely read".

=== Simplicity ===
Some librarians felt that Blyton's restricted use of language, a conscious product of her teaching background, was prejudicial to an appreciation of more literary qualities. In a scathing article published in Encounter in 1958, the journalist Colin Welch remarked that it was "hard to see how a diet of Miss Blyton could help with the 11-plus or even with the Cambridge English Tripos", but reserved his harshest criticism for Blyton's Noddy, describing him as an "unnaturally priggish ... sanctimonious ... witless, spiritless, snivelling, sneaking doll."

The author and educational psychologist Nicholas Tucker notes that it was common to see Blyton cited as people's favourite or least favourite author according to their age, and argues that her books create an "encapsulated world for young readers that simply dissolves with age, leaving behind only memories of excitement and strong identification". Fred Inglis considers Blyton's books to be technically easy to read, but to also be "emotionally and cognitively easy". He mentions that the psychologist Michael Woods believed that Blyton was different from many other older authors writing for children in that she seemed untroubled by presenting them with a world that differed from reality. Woods surmised that Blyton "was a child, she thought as a child, and wrote as a child ... the basic feeling is essentially pre-adolescent ... Enid Blyton has no moral dilemmas ... Inevitably Enid Blyton was labelled by rumour a child-hater. If true, such a fact should come as no surprise to us, for as a child herself all other children can be nothing but rivals for her". Inglis argues though that Blyton was devoted to children and put an enormous amount of energy into her work, with a powerful belief in "representing the crude moral diagrams and garish fantasies of a readership". Blyton's daughter Imogen has stated that she "loved a relationship with children through her books", but real children were an intrusion, and there was no room for intruders in the world that Blyton occupied through her writing.

=== Accusations of racism, xenophobia and sexism ===
Accusations of racism in Blyton's books were first made by Lena Jeger in a 1996 article for The Guardian. In the context of discussing possible moves to restrict publications inciting racial hatred, Jeger was critical of Blyton's The Little Black Doll, originally published in 1937. Sambo, the black doll of the title, is hated by his owner and other toys owing to his "ugly black face", and runs away. A shower of "magic rain" washes his face clean, after which he is welcomed back home with his now pink face. Jamaica Kincaid also considers the Noddy books to be "deeply racist" because of the blonde children and the black golliwogs. In Blyton's 1944 novel The Island of Adventure, a black servant named Jo-Jo is very intelligent, but is particularly cruel to the children.

Accusations of xenophobia were also made. As George Greenfield observed, "Enid was very much part of that between the wars middle class which believed that foreigners were untrustworthy or funny or sometimes both". The publisher Macmillan conducted an internal assessment of Blyton's The Mystery That Never Was, submitted to them at the height of her fame in 1960. The review was carried out by the author and books editor Phyllis Hartnoll, in whose view "There is a faint but unattractive touch of old-fashioned xenophobia in the author's attitude to the thieves; they are 'foreign' ... and this seems to be regarded as sufficient to explain their criminality". Macmillan rejected the manuscript, but it was published by William Collins in 1961, and then again in 1965 and 1983.

Blyton's depictions of boys and girls are considered by many critics to be sexist. In a 2005 article with The Guardian, Lucy Mangan proposed that The Famous Five series depicts a power struggle between Julian, Dick and George (Georgina), in which the female characters either act like boys or are talked down to, as when Dick lectures George: "it's really time you gave up thinking you're as good as a boy".

=== Revisions to later editions ===
To address criticisms levelled at Blyton's work, some later editions have been altered to reflect changing attitudes towards issues such as race, gender, violence between young persons, the treatment of children by adults, and legal changes in Britain as to what is allowable for young children to do (e.g. purchasing fireworks) in the years since the stories were originally written; modern reprints of the Noddy series substitute teddy bears or goblins for golliwogs, for instance. The golliwogs who steal Noddy's car and dump him naked in the Dark Wood in Here Comes Noddy Again are replaced in the 1986 revision by goblins, who strip Noddy only of his shoes and hat and return at the end of the story to apologise.

The Faraway Tree's Dame Slap, who made regular use of corporal punishment, was changed to Dame Snap, who no longer did so, and the names of Dick and Fanny in the same series (respective slang terms in some dialects for male and female genitals) were changed to Rick and Frannie. Characters in the Malory Towers and St. Clare's series are no longer spanked or threatened with a spanking but are instead scolded. References to George's short hair making her look like a boy were removed in revisions to Five on a Hike Together, reflecting the idea that girls need not have long hair to be considered feminine or normal, as was Anne's remark in The Famous Five that boys cannot wear pretty dresses or like girls' dolls. In The Adventurous Four, the names of the young twin girls were updated from Jill and Mary to Pippa and Zoe, among changes prompting the Enid Blyton Society's organiser to argue that they were akin to having "a Virgin Express rushing past the Railway Children because the age of steam is over... we don't want to ruin the charm of something that was written in a particular setting."

In 2010, the publisher of The Famous Five series, Hodder, announced its intention to update the language used in the books, of which it sold more than half a million copies a year. The changes, which Hodder described as "subtle", mainly affect the dialogue rather than the narrative. For instance, "school tunic" becomes "uniform", "mother and father" and "mother and daddy" (this latter one used by young female characters and deemed sexist) become "mum and dad", and "bathing" is replaced by "swimming" and "jersey" and "pullover" by "jumper". Some commentators see the changes as necessary to encourage modern readers, whereas others regard them as unnecessary and patronising. In 2016, Hodder's parent company, Hachette, announced that they would abandon the revisions, as readers' reaction showed they had not been a success.

== Stage, film and television adaptations ==
In 1954, Blyton adapted Noddy for the stage, producing the Noddy in Toyland pantomime in just two or three weeks. The production was staged at the 2,660-seat Stoll Theatre in Kingsway, London at Christmas. Its popularity resulted in the show running during the Christmas season for five or six years. Blyton was delighted with its reception by children in the audience and attended the theatre three or four times a week. TV adaptations of Noddy since 1954 include one in the 1970s narrated by Richard Briers. A Canadian hybrid live-action/animated series entitled Noddy (TV series) ran for two seasons from 1998 to 1999, airing on CBC Television in Canada and on PBS in the US. In 1955, a stage play based on the Famous Five was produced, and in January 1997 the King's Head Theatre embarked on a six-month tour of the UK with The Famous Five Musical, to commemorate Blyton's centenary. On 21 November 1998, The Secret Seven Save the World was first performed at the Sherman Theatre in Cardiff.

There have also been several film and television adaptations of the Famous Five: by the Children's Film Foundation in 1957 and 1964, Southern Television in 1978–79, and Zenith Productions in 1995–97. The series was also adapted for the German film Fünf Freunde, directed by Mike Marzuk and released in 2011.

St. Clare's was adapted into a 1991 anime television series, Mischievous Twins: The Tales of St. Clare's, by Tokyo Movie Shinsha.

The Comic Strip, a group of British comedians, produced two extreme parodies of the Famous Five for Channel 4 television: Five Go Mad in Dorset, broadcast in 1982, (Note: The Comic Strip's Five Go Mad in Dorset contains the first occurrence of a phrase wrongly attributed to Blyton, "lashings of ginger beer".) and Five Go Mad on Mescalin, broadcast the following year. A third in the series, Five Go to Rehab, was broadcast on Sky in 2012.

Blyton's The Faraway Tree series of books has also been adapted to television and film. On 29 September 1997, the BBC began broadcasting an animated series called The Enchanted Lands, based on the series. In 2014, the publishers Hachette, the copyright owners, announced a deal with the production company run by Sam Mendes for a film adaptation of "The Faraway Tree" series. Marlene Johnson, for Hachette, said: "Enid Blyton was a passionate advocate of children's storytelling, and The Magic Faraway Tree is a fantastic example of her creative imagination."

Blyton's Malory Towers has been adapted into a musical of the same name by Emma Rice's theatre company. It was scheduled to do a UK spring tour in 2020, which has been postponed due to the COVID-19 pandemic.

In 2020, Malory Towers was adapted as a 13 part TV series for the BBC. It is made partly in Toronto and partly in the UK in association with Canada's Family Channel. The series went to air in the UK in April 2020 and has been renewed for three more series.

== Papers ==
Seven Stories, the National Centre for Children's Books in Newcastle upon Tyne, holds the largest public collection of Blyton's papers and typescripts. The Seven Stories collection contains a significant number of Blyton's typescripts, including the previously unpublished novel, Mr Tumpy's Caravan, as well as personal papers and diaries. The purchase of the material in 2010 was made possible by special funding from the Heritage Lottery Fund, the MLA/V&A Purchase Grant Fund, and two private donations.

== See also ==
- Enid Blyton Society
- Enid Blyton's illustrators
