= Enid Blyton bibliography =

This is a list of 762 books by Enid Blyton (1897–1968), an English children's writer who also wrote under the pseudonym of Mary Pollock. She was one of the most successful children's storytellers of the 20th century.

== 1920s ==
=== 1922 ===
- Child Whispers

=== 1923 ===
- Real Fairies: Poems chocolate
- Responsive Singing Games

=== 1924 ===
- The Enid Blyton Book of Fairies
- Songs of Gladness
- Sports and Games
- Ten Songs from 'Child Whispers', music by Sydney Twinn
- The Zoo Book

=== 1925 ===
- The Enid Blyton Book of Bunnies

=== 1926 ===
- Book of Brownies, illustrator Ernest Aris
- The Bird Book

=== 1927 ===
- A Book of Little Plays
- The Play's the Thing, illustrator Alfred Bestall, music Alex Rowley, as Plays for Older Children and Plays for Younger Children, 1940
- Silver and Gold, illustrator Ethel Everett
- The Wonderful Adventure
- The Animal Book

=== 1929 ===
- The Book Around Europe
- Enid Blyton's Nature Lessons

== 1930s ==
=== 1930 ===
- The Knights of the Round Table, John O'London's Children's Library
- Tales from the Arabian Nights, John O'London's Children's Library
- Tales of Ancient Greece, John O'London's Children's Library
- Tales of Robin Hood, John O'London's Children's Library
- Wendy Wins Through
- The Luck of the Laytons

=== 1933 ===
- Cheerio!
- My First Reading Book
- Read To Us
- Let's Read
- Five-minute Tales
- Letters from Bobs
- News Chronicle's Boys and Girls Annual

=== 1934 ===
- Brer Rabbit Retold Old Thatch series
- The Adventures of Odysseus
- News Chronicle Boys' & Girls' Story Book No 2
- Children of Other Days, Old Thatch series
- Happy Stories Treasure Trove Readers Book I
- The Enid Blyton Poetry Book
- The Red Pixie Book
- Round the Year with Enid Blyton: Spring
- Round the Year with Enid Blyton: Summer
- Round the Year with Enid Blyton: Autumn
- Round the Year with Enid Blyton: Winter
- The Story of the Siege of Troy
- The Strange Tale of Mr. Wumble, Old Thatch series
- Tales of the Ancient Greeks and Persians
- Tales of the Romans
- Ten-Minute Tales
- The Talking Teapot, Old Thatch series

=== 1935 ===
- Birds at Home, Old Thatch series
- News Chronicle Boys' & Girls' Story Book No 3
- The Children's Garden
- The Green Goblin Book, republished in abridged form in 1951 as Feefo, Tuppeny and Jinks after the characters in the book
- Hedgerow Tales, illustrator Vere Temple
- Six Enid Blyton Plays

=== 1936 ===
- News Chronicle Boys' and Girls' Story Book No. 4
- The Famous Jimmy, illustrator Benjamin Rabier
- Fifteen-Minute Tales
- The Yellow Fairy Book

=== 1937 ===
- Adventures of the Wishing-Chair, illustrator Hilda McGavin, The Wishing-Chair series 1
- News Chronicle Boys' and Girls' Story Book No. 5
- A Book of Magic, Old Thatch series
- More Letters from Bobs

=== 1938 ===
- The Adventures of Binkle and Flip, illustrator Katherine Nixon
- Billy-Bob Tales, illustrator May Smith
- Heyo, Brer Rabbit!, illustrator Kathleen Nixon
- Mr. Galliano's Circus, Circus Series 1
- The Secret Island, illustrator E. H. Davie, Secret Series 1

=== 1939 ===
- The Adventures of Bobs, (later illustrator Lilian Chivers), Old Thatch series
- Boys' and Girls' Circus Book
- Cameo Plays, Book 4
- Children of Other Lands, Old Thatch series
- The Enchanted Wood, illustrator Dorothy M. Wheeler, Faraway Tree Series 1
- Hurrah for the Circus, Circus Series 2
- The Little Tree House, Josie, Click and Bun 1
- Naughty Amelia Jane!, Amelia Jane 1
- The Watchman with 100 Eyes, Old Thatch series

== 1940s ==
=== 1940 ===
- Birds of Our Gardens, illustrators Ernest Aris and Roland Green
- Bobs Again
- The News Chronicle Boys' and Girls' Annual, illustrators Kay Nixon (Kathleen Irene Blundell-Nixon) and Ernest Aris
- Boys and Girls Story Book 6, illustrator Dorothy M. Wheeler
- The Children of Cherry Tree Farm: A Tale of the Countryside, illustrator Harry Rountree
- The Children of Kidillin, as Mary Pollock
- Let's Have a Story
- Mister Meddle's Mischief, illustrators Joyce Mercer and Rosalind M. Turvey
- The Naughtiest Girl in the School, illustrator W. Lindsay Cable, Naughtiest Girl series 1
- The Secret of Spiggy Holes, illustrator E. H. Davie, Secret series 2
- Sunny Stories Annual
- Tales of Betsy-May, illustrator J. Gale Thomas
- The Treasure Hunters, illustrators Edith Wilson and M. Joyce Davies
- Three Boys and a Circus, as Mary Pollock
- Twenty-Minute Tales

=== 1941 ===
- The Adventurous Four, illustrator E. H. Davie
- Adventures of Mr. Pink-Whistle
- Enid Blyton's Book of the Year, illustrator Harry Rountree, music by Alec Rowley
- Five O'Clock Tales, illustrator Dorothy M. Wheeler
- The Further Adventures of Josie, Click and Bun, Josie, Click and Bun 2
- The Secret Mountain, illustrator Harry Rountree, Secret Series 3
- The Twins at St. Clare's, illustrator W. Lindsay Cable (later Jenny Chapple), St. Clare's series 1

=== 1942 ===
- Bed-Time Stories, illustrator Vernon Soper, Evans Little Books 2, published by Evans Brothers
- Brer Rabbit, illustrator Alfred Kerr, Evans Little Books 1, published by Evans Brothers
- The Children of Willow Farm, illustrator Harry Rountree
- Circus Days Again, Circus series 2
- Five on a Treasure Island, illustrator Eileen Soper, Famous Five series 1
- The Further Adventures of Brer Rabbit, illustrator Ernest Aris
- Enid Blyton's Happy Story Book, illustrator Eileen Soper
- Happy Stories, illustrator Alfred Kerr, Evans Little Books 6, published by Evans Brothers
- Hello, Mr. Twiddle!, illustrator Hilda McGavin
- Ho Ho and Too Smart, illustrator Alfred Kerr, Evans Little Books 4, published by Evans Brothers
- I'll Tell You a Story, illustrator Eileen Soper
- John Jolly at Christmas Time
- Jolly Tales, illustrator Alfred Kerr, Evans Little Books 3, published by Evans Brothers
- The Land of Far-Beyond, illustrator Horace J Knowles
- Mary Mouse and the Doll's House, Mary Mouse 1
- More Adventures on Willow Farm, illustrator Eileen Soper,
- The Naughtiest Girl Again, illustrator W. Lindsay Cable, Naughtiest Girl series 2
- The O'Sullivan Twins, illustrator W. Lindsay Cable (later Jenny Chapple), St. Clare's Series 2
- Enid Blyton Readers 3, illustrator Eileen Soper
- Shadow the Sheep Dog, illustrator Lucy Gee (later illustrator G. W. Backhouse)
- Six O'Clock Tales, illustrator Dorothy M. Wheeler
- Tales of the Toys, illustrator Alfred Kerr, Evans Little Books 5, published by Evans Brothers

=== 1943 ===
- The Adventures of Scamp, as Mary Pollock (1951 illustrator Olive Openshaw, 1992 illustrator Beryl Sanders)
- Bimbo and Topsy, illustrator Lucy Gee
- The Children's Life of Christ, illustrator Eileen Soper
- Come to the Circus, illustrator Eileen A. Soper
- Five Go Adventuring Again, illustrator Eileen A. Soper, Famous Five series 2
- The Further Adventures of Josie, Click and Bun!
- I'll Tell You Another Story, illustrator Eileen Soper
- John Jolly at the Circus
- John Jolly by the Sea
- John Jolly on the Farm
- The Magic Faraway Tree, illustrator Dorothy M. Wheeler, Faraway Tree series 2
- Enid Blyton's Merry Story Book, illustrator Eileen Soper
- More Adventures of Mary Mouse, illustrator Olive Openshaw, Mary Mouse 2
- The Mystery of the Burnt Cottage, illustrator Joseph Abbey, The Five Find-Outers 1
- Polly Piglet, illustrator Eileen Soper (later as Brockhampton Little Book 11)
- The Secret of Killimooin, illustrator Eileen Soper, Secret Series 4
- The Secret of Cliff Castle, writing as Mary Pollock
- Seven O'Clock Tales, illustrator Dorothy M. Wheeler
- Smuggler Ben, by Mary Pollock, illustrator E. H. Davie
- Mischief at St. Rollo's (as Mary Pollock)
- Summer Term at St. Clare's, illustrator W. Lindsay Cable, St. Clare's series 3
- The Toys Come to Life, illustrator Eileen Soper

=== 1944 ===
- At Appletree Farm
- Billy and Betty at the Seaside
- A Book of Naughty Children, illustrator Eileen Soper
- The Boy Next Door
- The Boy with the Loaves and Fishes, illustrator Elsie Walker
- The Christmas Book, illustrator Treyer Evans
- Daily Mail Annual for Boys & Girls 1944, editor
- The Dog That Went To Fairyland, illustrator Eileen Soper
- Eight O'Clock Tales, illustrator Dorothy M. Wheeler
- Jolly Little Jumbo, illustrator Eileen Soper
- Enid Blyton's Jolly Story Book, illustrator Eileen Soper
- Enid Blyton's Nature Lover's Book, illustrators Donia Nachshen and Noel Hopking, published by Evans Brothers
- Five Run Away Together, illustrator Eileen Soper, Famous Five series 3
- The Island of Adventure, illustrator Stuart Tresilian, The Adventure Series 1
- Little Mary Mouse Again, illustrator Olive F. Openshaw, Mary Mouse 3
- The Mystery of the Disappearing Cat, illustrator Joseph Abbey, The Five Find-Outers 2
- Rainy Day Stories, illustrator Nora S. Unwin, published by Evans Brothers
- The Second Form at St. Clare's, illustrator W. Lindsay Cable, St. Clare's series 4
- Tales from the Bible, illustrator Eileen Soper
- Tales of Toyland
- The Three Golliwogs
- Claudine at St.Clare's, illustrator W. Lindsay Cable, St. Clare's series 5
- The Train that Lost its Way, illustrator Eileen Soper

=== 1945 ===
- A Book of Magic, Old Thatch series
- The Blue Story Book, illustrator Eileen Soper
- The Brown Family. London to the Seaside, and Building a House, illustrators E. and R. Buhler
- The Caravan Family, illustrator William Fyffe
- The Conjuring Wizard and Other Stories
- The Family at Red-Roofs, illustrator W. Spence
- Fifth Formers of St. Clare's, W. Lindsay Cable, St. Clare's series 6
- The First Christmas
- Five Go to Smuggler's Top, illustrator Eileen Soper, Famous Five series 4
- Hello, Little Mary Mouse, illustrator Olive Openshaw, Mary Mouse 4
- Hollow Tree House, illustrator Elizabeth Wall
- The Mystery of the Secret Room, illustrator Joseph Abbey, The Five Find-Outers 3
- The Naughtiest Girl is a Monitor, illustrator Kenneth Lovell, Naughtiest Girl series 3
- The Nature Lover's Book, illustrators Noel Hopking and Donia Nachshen, Evans Brothers
- Round the Year Stories, Old Thatch series
- The Runaway Kitten, illustrator Eileen Soper, Brockhampton Enid Blyton Picture Book
- Enid Blyton's Sunny Story Book, illustrator Eileen Soper
- The Teddy Bear's Party, illustrator Eileen Soper, Little Book 5, 1989 reprint as The Night The Toys Had A Party, illustrator Susan Pearson
- The Twins Go to Nursery-Rhyme Land, illustrator Eileen Soper, Brockhampton Enid Blyton Picture Book

=== 1946 ===
- Amelia Jane Again, Amelia Jane 2
- The Bad Little Monkey, illustrator Eileen Soper
- The Castle of Adventure, illustrator Stuart Tresilian, The Adventure Series 2
- The Children at Happy House, illustrator Kathleen Gell
- Chimney Corner Stories
- First Term at Malory Towers, illustrator Stanley Lloyd, Malory Towers 1
- Five Go Off in a Caravan, illustrator Eileen Soper, Famous Five series 5
- The Folk of the Faraway Tree, illustrator Dorothy M. Wheeler, Faraway Tree Series 3
- Enid Blyton's Gay Story Book, illustrator Eileen Soper
- Josie, Click and Bun Again, strip book, illustrator Dorothy Wheeler, Josie Click and Bun 3
- The Little White Duck and Other Stories, illustrator Eileen A. Soper
- Mary Mouse and her Family, illustrator Olive Openshaw, Mary Mouse 5
- The Mystery of the Spiteful Letters, illustrator Joseph Abbey, The Five Find-Outers 4
- The Put-Em-Rights, illustrator Elizabeth Wall
- The Red Story Book, illustrator Eileen Soper
- The Surprising Caravan, illustrator Eileen Soper, Brockhampton Enid Blyton Picture Book
- The Train that Lost its Way, illustrator Eileen Soper (later Brockhampton Little Book 10)

=== 1947 ===
- The Adventurous Four Again!, illustrator Jessie Land
- Five on Kirrin Island Again, illustrator Eileen Soper, Famous Five series 6
- The Green Story Book, illustrator Eileen Soper
- The Happy House Children Again, illustrator Kathleen Gell
- Here Comes Mary Mouse Again, illustrator Olive Openshaw, Mary Mouse 6
- The Enid Blyton Holiday Book
- Second Holiday Book
- The House at the Corner, illustrator Elsie Walker
- The Little Green Duck and Other Stories, illustrator Eileen Soper, Bedtime Series
- Lucky Story Book, illustrator Eileen Soper
- More About Josie, Click and Bun, strip book, illustrator Dorothy Wheeler, Josie Click and Bun 4
- The Mystery of the Missing Necklace, illustrator Joseph Abbey, The Five Find-Outers 5
- The Second Book of Naughty Children
- Rambles With Uncle Nat
- The Saucy Jane Family, illustrator Ruth Gervis
- Second Form at Malory Towers, illustrator Stanley Lloyd, Malory Towers 2
- The Smith Family 1–3
- Enid Blyton's Treasury
- The Valley of Adventure, illustrator Stuart Tresilian, The Adventure Series 3
- The Very Clever Rabbit, illustrator Eileen Soper, Enid Blyton Bedtime Series

=== 1948 ===
- The Adventures of Pip, illustrator Raymond Sheppard
- My Enid Blyton Brer Rabbit Book BR1
- Come to the Circus!, illustrator Joyce A. Johnson
- Five Go Off to Camp, illustrator Eileen Soper, Famous Five series 7
- Third Holiday Book
- How Do You Do, Mary Mouse, illustrator Olive Openshaw, Mary Mouse 7
- Just Time for a Story, illustrator Grace Lodge
- Let's Have A Story, illustrator George Bowe
- The Little Girl at Capernaum, illustrator Elsie Walker
- Mister Icy-Cold
- More Adventures of Pip, illustrator Raymond Sheppard
- Now For a Story, illustrator Frank Varty
- The Mystery of the Hidden House, illustrator Joseph Abbey, The Five Find-Outers 6
- The Red-Spotted Handkerchief and Other Stories, illustrator Kathleen Gell
- The Sea of Adventure, illustrator Stuart Tresilian, The Adventure Series 4
- Secret of the Old Mill
- Six Cousins at Mistletoe Farm, illustrator Peter Beigel
- Tales After Tea
- Tales of Old Thatch, Coker edition
- Tales of the Twins, illustrator Eileen Soper
- They Ran Away Together, illustrator Jeanne Farrar
- Third Year at Malory Towers, illustrator Stanley Lloyd, Malory Towers 3
- We Want a Story, illustrator George Bowe, Pitkin

=== 1949 ===
- My Enid Blyton Bedside Book, Arthur Barker
- Enid Blyton Bible Stories: Old Testament
- Enid Blyton Pictures: Old Testament
- Bluebell Story Book
- A Book of Magic
- My Enid Blyton Book, illustrator Cicely Steed, 2
- Bumpy and His Bus, illustrator Dorothy M. Wheeler
- A Cat in Fairyland and Other Stories, Pitkin
- Chuff The Chimney Sweep and other stories, Pitkin
- The Circus Book, illustrator R. Webster
- Daffodil Story Book
- The Dear Old Snow Man, Brockhampton Nursery Series
- Don't be Silly, Mr. Twiddle
- The Enchanted Sea and Other Stories, illustrator E. H. Davie
- Five Get into Trouble, illustrator Eileen Soper, Famous Five series 8
- Good Morning Book, illustrator Don and Ann Goring
- Fourth Holiday Book, illustrator Mary Kendall Lee and Eelco M. T. H. Van der Beek, cover Hilda Boswell
- Humpty Dumpty and Belinda, illustrator Sally Gee
- Jinky's Joke and other stories, illustrator Kathleen Gell
- Little Noddy Goes to Toyland, illustrated by Harmsen van der Beek, Noddy Library 1
- The Mountain of Adventure, illustrator Stuart Tresilian, The Adventure Series 5
- Mr. Tumpy and his Caravan, illustrator Dorothy Wheeler
- The Mystery of the Pantomime Cat, illustrator Joseph Abbey, The Five Find-Outers 7
- Oh, What a Lovely Time, illustrator Jeanne Farrar, Brockhampton Press
- Enid Blyton's Robin Hood Book, illustrator Joyce Johnson, Latimer House
- The Rockingdown Mystery, illustrator Gilbert Dunlop, The Barney Mysteries 1
- The Secret Seven, illustrator George Brook, Secret Seven series 1
- A Story Party at Green Hedges, illustrator Grace Lodge
- The Strange Umbrella and Other Stories, illustrators E. H. Davie and M. Thorp
- Tales After Supper, illustrator Eileen Soper
- Those Dreadful Children, illustrator Grace Lodge
- Enid Blyton's Tiny Tales, illustrator Eileen Soper
- Upper Fourth at Malory Towers, illustrator Stanley Lloyd, Malory Towers 4

== 1950s ==
=== 1950 ===
- The Astonishing Ladder and Other Stories, illustrator Eileen Sloper
- Enid Blyton's Second Bedside Book
- Five Fall into Adventure, illustrator Eileen Soper, Famous Five series 9
- Fifth Holiday Book, illustrator Mary Kendall Lee et Al.
- Hurrah for Little Noddy, illustrator Harmsen Van Beek, Noddy Library 2
- In the Fifth at Malory Towers, illustrator Stanley Lloyd, Malory Towers 5
- Jolly Little Jumbo, illustrator Eileen Soper, Little Book 12 (?date)
- The Magic Knitting Needles and Other Stories, illustrator Eileen Sloper
- Mister Meddle's Muddles, illustrators Rosalind M. Turvey and Joyce Mercer
- Mr. Pink-Whistle Interferes, illustrator Dorothy M. Wheeler
- The Mystery of the Invisible Thief, illustrator Treyer Evans, The Five Find-Outers 8
- The Pole Star Family, illustrator Ruth Gervis
- Poppy Story Book
- The Rilloby Fair Mystery, illustrator Gilbert Dunlop, The Barney Mysteries 2
- A Rubbalong Tale, Werner Laurie peep-book
- Rubbalong Tales, illustrator Meredith Norman
- The Seaside Family, illustrator Ruth Gervis
- The Ship of Adventure, illustrator Stuart Tresilian, The Adventure Series 6
- Secret Seven Adventure, illustrator George Brook, Secret Seven series 2
- Six Cousins Again, illustrator Maurice Tulloch
- Tales About Toys, illustrator Jeanne Farrar, Brockhampton Little Books 1
- The Three Naughty Children and Other Stories, illustrator Eileen Sloper
- Tricky the Goblin and Other Stories, illustrator Eileen Sloper
- We Do Love Mary Mouse, illustrator Olive Openshaw, Mary Mouse 8
- Welcome, Mary Mouse, illustrator Olive Openshaw, Mary Mouse 9
- What an Adventure, illustrator Eileen Soper, Little Book 2
- The Wishing Chair Again, illustrator Hilda McGavin, Wishing Chair series 2
- The Yellow Story Book, illustrator Eileen Soper

=== 1951 ===
- Enid Blyton's Third Bedside Book
- Benny and the Princess, Pitkin Pleasure Book
- The Big Bedtime Story
- The Big Noddy Book 1
- Boody the Great Goblin and Other Stories, illustrator Gordon Robinson
- The Buttercup Farm Family, illustrator Ruth Gervis
- Buttercup Story Book
- Down at the Farm with Enid Blyton
- Father Christmas and Belinda
- Five on a Hike Together, illustrator Eileen Soper, Famous Five series 10
- The Flying Goat and Other Stories, Pitkin
- Hello Twins, illustrator Eileen Soper, Little Book 4
- Here Comes Noddy Again!, Noddy Library 4
- Sixth Holiday Book
- Hurrah for Mary Mouse, illustrator Olive Openshaw, Mary Mouse 10
- Enid Blyton's Jolly Story Book
- Last Term at Malory Towers, illustrator Stanley Lloyd, Malory Towers 6
- Let's Go to the Circus
- Enid Blyton's Lucky Story Book
- Mr. Pink-Whistle Comes Along & Other Tales
- The Mystery of the Vanished Prince, illustrator Treyer Evans, The Five Find-Outers 9
- Noddy and Big Ears Have a Picnic Noddy's House of Books 6
- Noddy and His Car, Noddy Library 3
- Noddy Goes to the Seaside Noddy's House of Books 3
- Noddy Has a Shock Noddy's House of Books 4
- Noddy Has more Adventures Noddy's House of Books 2
- Noddy Off to Rocking Horse Land Noddy's House of Books 5
- Noddy has some Adventures, hardback strip book
- Noddy Painting Book
- A Picnic Party with Enid Blyton
- Pippy the Gnome and Other Stories, Pitkin
- A Prize for Mary Mouse, illustrator Olive Openshaw, Mary Mouse 11
- The Proud Golliwog, illustrator Molly Brett, Little Book 3
- The Queen Elizabeth Family, illustrator Ruth Gervis
- The Ring O' Bells Mystery, illustrator Gilbert Dunlop, The Barney Mysteries 3
- The Rubadub Mystery, illustrator Gilbert Dunlop, The Barney Mysteries 4
- Runaway Teddy Bear and Other Stories, illustrator Eileen Soper, E. H. Davie et al., Pitkin Pleasure Book
- The Six Bad Boys, illustrator Mary Gernat
- Enid Blyton's Sunny Story Book
- Tales from the Arabian Nights
- Too-Wise the Wonderful Wizard and Other Stories, Pitkin
- Trouble for the Twins, illustrator Eileen Soper, Little Books 18
- The Little Spinning House, Pitkin Pleasure Book
- A Tale of Little Noddy, Noddy's House of Books 1
- Up the Faraway Tree, illustrator Dorothy Wheeler, Faraway Tree series 4
- Well Done Secret Seven, illustrator George Brook, Secret Seven series 3

=== 1952 ===
- The Adventurous Four Again
- Enid Blyton's Animal Lover's Book, illustrator James Lucas, E. C. Mansell, Norman R. Satchel
- Enid Blyton's Fourth Bedside Book
- Big Ears Loses Some Jewels, Noddy's Ark of Books 2
- Big Noddy Book 2
- Bob the Little Jockey illustrator Pierre Probst, Little Gift Book
- The Bonfire Folk
- Third Brer Rabbit Book
- Enid Blyton's Bright Story Book
- The Circus of Adventure, Adventure Series 7
- Come Along Twins, illustrator Eileen Soper, Little Books 9
- Don't Be Silly, Mr. Twiddle!
- Enid Blyton's Gay Story Book
- Enid Blyton's Good Morning Book, illustrator Willy Schermelé
- Enid Blyton's Noddy Song Book
- Enid Blyton's Omnibus!, illustrator Jessie Land, mixed short stories
- Five Have a Wonderful Time, illustrator Eileen Soper, Famous Five series 11
- The Funny Boy & Other Tales
- Here's the Naughtiest Girl!
- Seventh Holiday Book
- The Mad Teapot, illustrator Mandy Brett
- The Magic Needle & Other Tales
- Mandy Mops and Cubby Again, strip book
- Mandy, Mops and Cubby Find a House, strip book
- Mary Mouse and her Bicycle, illustrator Olive Openshaw, Mary Mouse 12
- Mary Mouse and the Noah's Ark, illustrator Olive Openshaw, Mary Mouse 13
- Mister Meddle's Mischief
- Mr. Tumpy Plays a Trick on Saucepan, illustrator Dorothy Wheeler
- Mr. Twiddle's Trumpet & Other Tales
- My First Enid Blyton book
- My First Nature Book: The Brownie's Magic
- My Second Nature Book: The Spell That Went Wrong
- The Mystery of the Strange Bundle, illustrator Treyer Evans, The Five Find-Outers 10
- New Testament Bible Plates
- Noddy and Big Ears
- Noddy and the Three Bears, Noddy's Ark of Books 3
- Noddy Colour Strip Book, hardback strip book
- Noddy Goes to School, Noddy Library 6
- Noddy's Penny Wheel Car, strip book
- Noddy and the Big Balloon, Noddy's Ark of Books 5
- Noddy and the Flying Elephant, Noddy's Ark of Books 1
- Noddy and the Witch's Wand, strip book
- Noddy's Car Gets a Squeak, strip book
- Noddy's Car Rides in the Air, Noddy's Ark of Books 4
- Pippi the Little Panther illustrator Pierre Probst, Little Gift Book
- The Queer Adventure, illustrator Norman Meredith
- Ruby Storybook
- The Rat-a-Tat Mystery, illustrator Gilbert Dunlop, The Barney Mysteries 5
- Scamp Goes on Holiday, illustrator Pierre Probst, Little Gift Book
- Secret Seven on the Trail, illustrator George Brook, Secret Seven series 4
- Snowdrop Story Book
- The Snowman in Boots & Other Tales
- The Story of My Life autobiography
- The Enid Blyton Story Time Book
- Tales of Green Hedges
- The Very Big Secret, illustrator Ruth Gervis
- Welcome Josie, Click and Bun!, strip book, illustrator Dorothy Wheeler, Josie Click and Bun 5
- Well Done Noddy!, Noddy Library 5

=== 1953 ===
- The Animal Book, illustrator Kathleen Nixon
- Enid Blyton's Fifth Bedside Book, illustrator Catherine Scholz
- Before I Go to Sleep
- Bible Stories
- Big Bedtime Book, illustrator Mary Brooks
- Big Noddy Book 3
- Bimbo and His Cousin, illustrator Pierre Probst, Hackett's Little Gift Books
- Enid Blyton's Fourth Brer Rabbit Book
- Chimney Corner Stories
- Enid Blyton's Christmas Story, advent calendar
- Clicky and the Flying Horse, illustrator Molly Brett
- Clicky the Clockwork Clown, illustrator Molly Brett
- Five Go Down to the Sea, illustrator Eileen Soper, Famous Five series 12
- Go Ahead Secret Seven, illustrator Bruno Kay, Secret Seven series 5
- Gobo and Mr. Fierce, strip book
- The Golliwog Grumbled, as Little Book 17 (1955)
- Here Come the Twins, illustrator Eileen Soper, Little Book 13
- Here Comes Little Noddy, illustrator Beek
- Eighth Holiday Book
- Mandy Makes Cubby a Hat, illustrator Dorothy Wheeler
- Mr. Tumpy in the Land of Wishes, illustrator Dorothy Wheeler
- Enid Blyton's My Book of Fables, from the Tales of La Fontaine, illustrator Simon Romain
- The Mystery of Holly Lane, illustrator Treyer Evans, The Five Find-Outers series 11
- New Noddy Colour Strip Book, illustrator Beek, hardback strip book
- My Fifth Nature Book
- Noddy and Jimmy Giraffe, Noddy's Garage of Books 5
- Noddy and the Cuckoo's Nest, strip book
- Noddy and the Naughty Toys, Noddy's Garage of Books 2
- Noddy at the Seaside, illustrator Beek, Noddy Library 7
- Noddy Gets Captured, illustrator Beek, strip book
- Noddy is Very Silly, strip book
- Noddy Loses His Clothes, Noddy's Garage of Books 1
- Noddy Makes a Mistake, Noddy's Garage of Books 3
- Noddy Wins a Prize, Noddy's Garage of Books 4
- Patapouf's Circus, illustrator Pierre Probst, Little Gift Book/Collins Wonder Colour Book
- The Secret of Moon Castle, illustrator Dorothy Hall, Secret Series 5
- Snowball the Pony, illustrator Iris Gillespie
- The Story of Our Queen, illustrator F. Stocks May
- Tenth Tell-a-Story Book
- Visitors in the Night, illustrator Molly Brett, Brockhampton Little Books 14
- Well, Really Mr. Twiddle, illustrator Hilda McGavin

=== 1954 ===
- The Adventure of the Secret Necklace, illustrator Isabel Veevers
- The Adventures of Scamp, illustrator Olive Openshaw
- Animal Tales, Collins Wonder Colour Book
- Animals at Home, Old Thatch series
- Away Goes Sooty, Collins Wonder Colour Book
- Enid Blyton's Sixth Bedside Book
- Big Noddy Book
- Bimbo the Little Kitten, Little Gift Book
- Bimbo and Blackie, Little Gift Book
- Bimbo and Blackie Go Camping, illustrator Pierre Probst, Collins Wonder Colour Books
- Bobs, Collins Wonder Colour Book
- Bruiny and his Brothers, illustrator Pierre Probst, Little Gift Book
- The Castle without a Door and Other Stories, Pitkin
- The Children at Green Meadows, illustrator Grace Lodge
- Christmas with Scamp and Bimbo, illustrator Pierre Probst, Collins Wonder Colour Books
- The Clever Little Donkey, Collins Wonder Colour Book
- Clicky the Clown at the Circus, illustrator Molly Brett
- Colin the Cow-Boy, illustrator R. Caille, Collins Wonder Colour Book
- Enid Blyton's Daffodil Story Book
- Five Go to Mystery Moor, illustrator Eileen Soper, Famous Five series 13
- Fun with the Twins, illustrator Eileen Soper, Little Books 16
- Enid Blyton's Friendly Story Book, illustrator Eileen Soper
- Favorite Book of Fables, Collins Wonder Colour Book
- Gerry the Little Giraffe, Little Gift Book
- Good Work Secret Seven, illustrator Bruno Kay, Secret Seven series 6
- The Greatest Book in the World, illustrator Mabel Cook
- The Ninth Holiday Book
- How Funny You Are, Noddy!, hardback strip book
- The Laughing Kitten
- The Little Toy Farm, Pitkin
- Enid Blyton's Magazine Annual No. 1
- Enid Blyton's Marigold Story Book
- Mary Mouse to the Rescue, illustrator Olive Openshaw, Mary Mouse 14
- Merry Mister Meddle!, illustrators Rosalind M. Turvey and Joyce Mercer
- More About Amelia Jane!, illustrator Rene Cloke, Amelia Jane 3
- The Mystery of Tally-Ho Cottage, illustrator Treyer Evans, The Five Find-Outers 12
- Neddy the Little Donkey, Collins Wonder Colour Book
- Noddy and Mr. Roundy in Clowntown, Noddy's Castle of Books 4
- Noddy and Mr. Cheery, Noddy's Castle of Books 5
- Noddy and the Magic Goldfish, Noddy's Castle of Books 2
- Noddy and the Magic Rubber, Noddy Library 9
- Noddy and the Snow-House, strip book
- Noddy Gets into Trouble, illustrator Mary Brooks, Noddy Library 8
- Noddy Goes Dancing, strip book
- Noddy Goes to the Fair, illustrator Charles Seez
- Noddy in the Land of King Ho–Ho, Noddy's Castle of Books 3
- Noddy the Cry-Baby, strip book
- Noddy Visits the Land of Tops, Noddy's Castle of Books 1
- Scamp, Little Gift Book
- Scamp and Bimbo, Collins Wonder Colour Book
- Scamp at School, Collins Wonder Colour Book
- Scamp and Caroline, illustrator Pierre Probst, Little Gift Book
- Scamp Goes to the Zoo illustrator Pierre Probst
- Sooty illustrator Pierre Probst, Collins Wonder Colour Book
- Tales After Tea
- Three Little Lions, Little Gift Book
- What a Surprise, illustrator Molly Brett
- What Shall I Be?, Collins Wonder Colour Book

=== 1955 ===
- About Silly Sammy
- About the Doll that Fell out of the Pram
- Enid Blyton's Annual (series produced by L. T. A. Robinson Ltd., some undated)
- Away Goes Sooty, illustrator Pierre Probst, Collins Wonder Book
- Enid Blyton's Seventh Bedside Book
- Benjy and the Others, illustrator Kathleen Gell
- Bible Stories from the Old Testament
- Bible Stories Old Testament II
- Sixth Brer Rabbit Book
- My Third Enid Blyton Book
- Five Have Plenty of Fun, illustrator Eileen Soper, Famous Five series 14
- Enid Blyton's Foxglove Story Book
- Gobo in the Land of Dreams
- The Golliwog Grumbled, illustrator Molly Brett
- Hello, Little Noddy, strip book
- Tenth Holiday Book
- Holiday House, illustrator Grace Lodge
- Enid Blyton's Magazine Annual Number 2
- Mandy, Mops and Cubby and the Whitewash
- Mary Mouse in Nursery Rhyme Land, illustrator Olive Openshaw, Mary Mouse 15
- Mischief Again
- More Chimney Corner Stories
- Mr Pink-Whistle's Party
- Mister Tumpy in the Land of Boys and Girls, illustrator Dorothy Wheeler
- New Big Noddy Book, illustrator Peter Wienk
- Noddy in Toyland, Noddy Picture Book
- Noddy Meets Father Christmas, illustrator Mary Brooks, Noddy Library 11
- Playing at Home: A Novelty Book, illustrator Sabine Schweitzer
- The River of Adventure, illustrator Stuart Tresilian, The Adventure Series 8
- Run-About's Holiday, illustrator Lilian Chivers
- Scamp at School, illustrator Pierre Probst
- Secret Seven Win Through, illustrator Bruno Kay, Secret Seven series 7
- Three Cheers for Noddy, strip book 5
- Trouble for the Twins, illustrator Eileen Soper
- The Troublesome Three, illustrator Leo
- Who Will Hold the Giant, play
- You Funny Little Noddy, Noddy Library 10

=== 1956 ===
- A Day with Mary Mouse, illustrator Frederick White, Mary Mouse 16
- Be Brave, Little Noddy!, Noddy Library 13
- Enid Blyton's Eighth Bedside Book
- New Big Noddy Book 6
- Bom the Little Toy Drummer, illustrator R. Paul-Hoye
- The Clever Little Donkey, illustrator Romain Simon
- A Day with Noddy, Noddy Picture Book
- Five on a Secret Trail, illustrator Eileen Soper, Famous Five series 15
- Four in a Family, illustrator Tom Kerr
- Let's Have a Party
- Enid Blyton's Magazine Annual Number 3
- The Mystery of the Missing Man, illustrator Lilian Buchanan, The Five Find-Outers 13
- Noddy and His Passengers, Noddy's Station of Books 1
- Noddy and Naughty Gobby, Noddy's Station of Books 4
- Noddy and Tessie Bear, Noddy Library 12
- Noddy and the Magic Boots, Noddy's Station of Books 2
- Noddy Be Careful!, strip book 6
- Noddy Flies a Kite, Noddy's Station of Books 3
- Noddy Has Hankie Troubles, Noddy's Station of Books 5
- Enid Blyton's Book of Her Famous Play Noddy in Toyland
- Scamp at School, illustrator Pierre Probst
- A Story Book of Jesus, illustrator Elsie Walker
- Three Cheers Secret Seven, illustrator Burgess Sharrocks, Secret Seven series 8
- Water-Lily Story Book, illustrator Hilda Boswell and Dorothy Hall

=== 1957 ===
- Enid Blyton's Annual, illustrator Gilbert Dunlop
- Ninth Bedside Book
- Bom and His Magic Drumstick
- Brer Rabbit Funtime Adventures
- Do Look Out Noddy, Noddy Library 15
- Five Go to Billycock Hill, illustrator Eileen Soper, Famous Five series 16
- The Twelfth Holiday Book, illustrators Grace Lodge and Robert MacGillivray
- Enid Blyton's Magazine Annual Number 4
- Mary Mouse and the Garden Party, illustrator Frederick White, Mary Mouse 17
- The Mystery of the Strange Messages, illustrator Lilian Buchanan, The Five Find-Outers 14
- New Testament Picture Books 1 and 2, illustrator Elsie Walker
- Noddy and the Bear Who Lost His Growl, strip book
- Noddy and the Bumpy-Dog, Noddy Library 14
- Noddy and the Tricky Teddy, strip book
- Noddy Tricks Mr. Sly, strip book
- Noddy's New Big Book 7
- Secret Seven Mystery, illustrator Burgess Sharrocks, Secret Seven series 9 (1st edition published by Brockhampton Press)

=== 1958 ===
- ABC with Noddy, Noddy Picture Book
- About Amanda Going Away
- About the Wizard Who Really Was a Nuisance
- Enid Blyton's Tenth Bedside Book
- The Birthday Kitten, illustrator Grace Lodge
- Bom Annual, illustrator Paul Hoye and H.W. Felstead
- Bom Annual 2
- Bom Goes Adventuring
- Bom Goes to Ho Ho Village
- Eighth Brer Rabbit Book
- Brer Rabbit Holiday Adventures
- Clicky Gets into Trouble
- Five Get into a Fix, illustrator Eileen Soper, Famous Five series 17
- Enid Blyton's Good Morning Book, illustrator Willy Schermelé
- Enid Blyton Holiday Book
- Mary Mouse Goes to the Fair, illustrator Frederick White, Mary Mouse 18
- Mr Pink-Whistle's Big Book
- My Big Ears Picture Book, 1958
- My Noddy Picture Book, Noddy Picture Book
- New Big Noddy Book
- Noddy Buys a Spell, Noddy's Shop of Books 1
- Noddy Buys Tinny a Present, Noddy's Shop of Books 5
- Noddy Complains to Mr. Plod, Noddy's Shop of Books 4
- Noddy Drives Much Too Fast, Noddy's Shop of Books 3
- Noddy Has an Adventure, Noddy Library 17
- Noddy Helps Tinny Build a House, Noddy's Shop of Books 2
- Noddy Jingle Book
- Noddy's Own Nursery Rhymes, Noddy Board Book
- Noddy Painting Book
- Puzzle for the Secret Seven, illustrator Burgess Sharrocks, Secret Seven series 10
- Rumble and Chuff 1, 2, illustrator David Walsh
- You're a Good Friend, Noddy, Noddy Library 16

=== 1959 ===
- Adventure Stories (reprints Mischief at St. Rollo's and The Children of Kidillin)
- Eleventh Bedside Book
- Bible Stories, New Testament Book 6 The Man by the Pool, The Poor Leper
- Big Noddy Book
- Bom and the Clown, illustrator R. Paul-Hoye
- Bom and the Rainbow
- Enid Blyton's Book of the Year
- Dog Stories (reprints Three Boys and a Circus and The Adventures of Scamp)
- The Famous Five Special (this is an out-of-series omnibus)
- Hullo, Bom and Wuffy Dog, strip book
- Holiday Book
- Mary Mouse Has a Wonderful Idea, illustrator Frederick White, Mary Mouse 19
- Mystery Stories (reprints The Secret of Cliff Castle and Smuggler Ben)
- Noddy and the Bunkey, Noddy Library 19
- Noddy Goes to Sea, Noddy Library 18
- Noddy's Car Picture Book, Noddy Picture Book
- Noddy's Grand Adventure, strip book 7
- The Ragamuffin Mystery, illustrator Anyon Cook, The Barney Mystery Series 6
- Secret Seven Fireworks, illustrator Burgess Sharrocks, Secret Seven series 11
- Enid Blyton's Story Book

== 1960s ==
=== 1960–61 ===
Title	Series	Year	Notes
The Adventure of the Strange Ruby		1960	illustrator Roger Payne
The Twelfth Bedside Book	Bedside Books	1960	last of series
Bom Goes to Magic Town	Bom	1960	illustrator R. Paul-Hoye
Brer Rabbit and his Friends	Brer Rabbit	1960	
Cheer Up, Little Noddy!	Noddy Library 20	1960	
Clicky and Tiptoe	Clicky	1960	illustrator Molly Brett
Five on Finniston Farm	Famous Five 18	1960	
Good Old Secret Seven	Secret Seven 12	1960	illustrator Burgess Sharrocks
Happy Day Stories		1960	illustrator Marcia Lane Foster
Mary Mouse Goes to the Sea	Mary Mouse 20	1960	illustrator Frederick White
Noddy and the Runaway Wheel	Noddy	1960	strip book
Noddy Goes to the Fair	Noddy Library 21	1960	
Noddy's Bag of Money	Noddy	1960	strip book
Noddy's 1 2 3 Book	Noddy Picture Book	1960	
Noddy's Car Gets into Trouble	Noddy	1960	strip book
Noddy's Tall Blue Book	Noddy	1960	
Noddy's Tall Green Book	Noddy	1960	
Noddy's Tall Orange Book	Noddy	1960	
Noddy's Tall Pink Book	Noddy	1960	
Noddy's Tall Red Book	Noddy	1960	
Noddy's Tall Yellow Book	Noddy	1960	
Will the Fiddler		1960	illustrator Grace Lodge
The Big Enid Blyton Book		1961	
Bom at the Seaside	Bom	1961	
Bom Goes to the Circus	Bom	1961	strip book
Happy Holiday, Clicky	Clicky	1961	strip book, illustrator Molly Brett
Mary Mouse Goes Out for the Day	Mary Mouse 21	1961	illustrator Frederick White
Five Go to Demon's Rocks	Famous Five 19	1961	illustrator Eileen Soper
Mr Plod and Little Noddy	Noddy Library 22	1961	
The Mystery of Banshee Towers	The Five Find-Outers 15	1961	illustrator Lilian Buchanan
The Mystery That Never Was		1961	illustrator Gilbert Dunlop
Noddy's Toyland Train Picture Book	Noddy Picture Book	1961	
Shock for the Secret Seven	Secret Seven 13	1961	illustrator Burgess Sharrocks
Tales at Bedtime		1961	

=== 1962 ===
- A Day at School with Noddy, Noddy Picture Book
- Five Have a Mystery to Solve, illustrator Eileen Soper, Famous Five series 20
- Fun with Mary Mouse, illustrator R. Paul-Hoye, Mary Mouse 22
- The Four Cousins, illustrator Joan Thompson
- The Eighth Holiday Book
- Look Out Secret Seven, illustrator Burgess Shanks, Secret Seven series 14
- Noddy and the Tootles, Noddy Library 23
- Stories for Monday

=== 1963 ===
- The Boy Who Wanted a Dog, illustrator Sally Michel
- Brer Rabbit Again, illustrator Grace Lodge
- Brer Rabbit Book, illustrator Grace Lodge (1st edition published by Dean & Sons Ltd.)
- Brer Rabbit's a Rascal, illustrator Grace Lodge
- Chimney Corner Stories
- Five Are Together Again, illustrator Eileen Soper, Famous Five series 21 (and final book)
- Five Have a Puzzling Time and Other Stories
- Fun for the Secret Seven, illustrator Burgess Sharrocks, Secret Seven series 15 (and final book)
- Noddy and the Aeroplane, Noddy Library 24
- Round the Clock Stories
- Sunshine Book
- Tales of Brave Adventure - 13 stories about Robin Hood, 14 stories about King Arthur (1st edition published by Dean & Sons Ltd.)
- Tales of Toyland and Other Stories

=== 1964 ===
- The Dog without a Collar
- Happy Hours Story Book
- The Hidey-Hole, illustrator Daphne Rowles
- Mary Mouse and the Little Donkey, illustrator R. Paul-Hoye, Mary Mouse 23
- My Favourite Enid Blyton Story Book
- The Enid Blyton Story Book for Fives to Sevens, illustrators Dorothy Hall and Grace Shelton
- Storytime Book
- Fifth Tell-A-Story Book
- Sixth Tell-A-Story Book
- Seventh Tell-A-Story Book
- Eighth Tell-A-Story Book
- Ninth Tell-A-Story Book
- Tenth Tell-A-Story Book
- Tinkle-Tinkle-Jingle-Jing

=== 1965 ===
- The Boy Who Came Back, illustrator Elsie Walker
- The Dog Who Would Go Digging, John and Mary 3
- Easy Reader Books 1–4
- High Adventure with Enid Blyton, John and Mary Stories
- Eleventh Holiday Book
- Learn to Count with Noddy
- Learn to Read about Animals with Noddy
- Learn to Tell Time with Noddy
- The Man Who Stopped To Help
- Noddy and His Friends Nursery Picture Book, Noddy Picture Book
- Noddy's Car
- Storyland, 1 and 2
- Tales of Long Ago, illustrators Anne and Janet Johnstone
- Fifteenth Tell-A-Story Book
- Enid Blyton's Treasure Box
- Enid Blyton's Sunshine Book

=== 1966 ===
- Adventure for Goldie Sunshine Picture Story Book
- Annabelle's Little Thimble, Tulip Book 2
- The Dog Without a Collar Sunshine Picture Story Book
- Fairy Folk Story Book, illustrator Rene Cloke
- Fireside Tales
- The Grandpa Clock Sunshine Picture Story Book
- The Great Big Fish, John and Mary 1
- The Higgledy Piggledy Goblins, Sunshine Picture Story Book
- The High and Mighty Bear, Sunshine Picture Story Book
- How John Got His Ducklings, John and Mary
- The Lost Slippers, Tulip Book 3
- Pixieland Story Book, illustrator Rene Cloke
- Playtime Story Book 10
- Playtime Story Book 11
- Run-about's Holiday, illustrator Lilian Chivers
- Stories for Bedtime
- Stories for You (1st edition published by Dean & Sons Ltd.)
- Tales at Bedtime, illustrator Hilda McGavin
- The Three Sailors, John and Mary 5
- The Wheel That Ran Away, John and Mary

=== 1967 ===
- Big Ears Board Book, Noddy Board Book
- Holiday Animal Stories
- Holiday Magic Stories
- Holiday Pixie Stories
- Holiday Toy Stories
- Noddy and his Passengers, Noddy Picture Book (title earlier)
- Noddy and the Magic Boots, Noddy Picture Book (title earlier)
- Noddy and the Noah's Ark, Noddy Picture Book
- Noddy Board Book, Noddy Board Book
- Noddy Toyland ABC
- Noddy's Aeroplane Picture Book, Noddy Picture Book
- Noddy's Funny Kite
- Pixie Tales

=== 1968 ===
- Bedtime Annual, illustrator Jo Berryman
- Brownie Tales
- Granny's Lovely Necklace
- My First Enid Blyton Sunshine Reader
- Playtime Story Book 5

== Published posthumously ==
- Anytime Tales (1971)
- The Dog with the Long Tail, and other stories (1975)
- More Wishing-Chair Stories (2000)

The Young Adventurers series (2004), originally published as the Riddle Series (1997) by HarperCollins.

- The Riddle of Holiday House ISBN 1-84135-737-5
- The Riddle That Never Was ISBN 0-00-694574-0
- The Riddle of The Rajah's Ruby ISBN 0-00-694575-9
- The Riddle of The Hollow Tree ISBN 0-00-694576-7
- The Riddle of The Hidden Treasure ISBN 0-00-694577-5
- The Riddle of The Boy Next Door ISBN 0-00-694578-3

== Unpublished ==
- Mr Tumpy's Caravan (discovered in a collection of her papers, in 2011; not the 1949 publication of similar title)
