= Come to the Circus! =

1948 book by Enid Blyton

Come to the Circus! (1948) is a children's standalone novel written by Enid Blyton.

== Plot ==
Fenella, an orphan, lives with her Aunt Janet. When her aunt decides to get married and move to Canada, Fenella is sent to live with her Aunt Lou and Uncle Ursie, who live in a circus. Initially she is terrified at the idea, being a timid person who is frightened of animals. Eventually she settles in and learns to love her new life, making new friends with both people and animals, and winning over her cold, bad-tempered Aunt Lou, who has never got over the tragic death of her own daughter, Carol. By the end of the novel, Fenella has become a circus performer.

== Editions ==
The first edition was published in 1948 by George Newnes, with illustrations by Joyce A. Johnson. Subsequent editions were published by Armada, Dean, and Beaver, with illustrations by Dylan Roberts, Rene Cloke, and Lesley Smith, respectively.

== Other information ==
The first chapter of the book appeared in Sunny Stories magazine in 1947.

Come to the Circus! is not to be confused with Come to the Circus (1943), a short story book by the same author.
