= Alfred Burgess Sharrocks =

- Born: 1919; Stockport
- Died: 1988 (aged 68–69); Bangor
- Occupation: Painter, illustrator, ornithologist, teacher

Alfred Burgess Sharrocks (1919–1988) was an English illustrator, painter, ornithologist and teacher.

He is known for his work on titles by Enid Blyton.

== Early life ==
Sharrocks was born in Stockport, Cheshire in 1919.

He was educated at Stockport College School of Art from 1933 to 1937; and from 1937 to 1939 at Manchester Municipal College of Technology.

He served in the Royal Navy during World War II. He then spent a period teaching at Stockport School of Art. From 1946 to 1951 he was at the Royal Academy Schools and from 1967 he lectured at Llandrillo College of Technology.

== Artistic career ==
Cover of Enid Blyton's Three Cheers Secret Seven (1956, Brockhampton Press); Sharrocks' first for her

Sharrocks painted professionally, including many Welsh hillside landscapes, and worked as a commercial illustrator. Beginning in 1956, he illustrated a number of books and book jackets for Secret Seven stories by Enid Blyton.

He also illustrated a magazine serialisation of Blyton's "Bonfire Night for the Secret Seven" for Enid Blyton Magazine, in 18 parts, using different artworks to those he drew for the book version, Secret Seven Fireworks.

Sharrocks' signature from his watercolour painting 'Summer Hillside'

At least some of his works were signed "A. Burgess Sharrocks".

From 1962 to 1967, he served as President of the Royal Cambrian Academy of Art, having become an associate member in 1952 and a full member in 1953.

A watercolour painting of Conway Castle is held by the National Museum of Wales, to whom it was donated by Aberconwy Historical Society in 1957.

His Wherever You Go The Post Office, Maldwyn, Anglesey (1961), for National Savings, is in the UK's National Archives.

The painting Nant Uchaf, Clwyd (circa 1975) is in The National Library of Wales.

== Ornithology ==
In 1957 Sharrocks was elected president of Cambrian Ornithological Society.

== Personal life ==
Sharrocks died in Bangor, Wales, in 1988.
