= The Six Bad Boys =

1951 children's novel by Enid Blyton

The Six Bad Boys (1951) is a standalone novel by children's author Enid Blyton.

== Plot summary ==
Two ten year old boys, Bob and Tom, both have unhappy home lives. Bob's father is dead, and his mother is finding Bob increasingly difficult to manage. She takes a job, which means she is not at home when he returns from school each day, which Bob resents. He is friendly with a family called the Mackenzies, and wishes he could have a family like them. Tom's family, meanwhile, are always fighting, and eventually his father leaves home.

Bob and Tom both get involved with a gang of four other boys in the town: Fred, Patrick, Jack and Len. They all become 'The Six Terrors Gang', involved in petty crime.

Eventually they all get caught by the police and ordered to appear at the juvenile magistrates' court. The magistrate sentences all the boys (except Jack) to be sent away from home, either to schools or foster homes. As Bob (whose mother does not want him anymore) is waiting to be sent away to his new home far away, the Mackenzies arrive and offer to have Bob live with them as part of their family.

A year later, Bob, who is still with his new family, thinks about the old gang members and wonders what they are all doing now. The future looks positive for Tom, Jack and Len, but Fred and Patrick both still have "a great deal to learn".

== Inspiration ==
According to Blyton's brother, Hanly, the home life of Tom and his family is largely autobiographical.

== Reception ==
Blyton dedicated the book to children's court magistrate, Basil Henriques, who wrote a forward for it, saying, "The description of the workings of the minds of Bob and Tom is, in my opinion, absolutely brilliant. It shows why the broken home causes children to go wrong, and the gradual deterioration of both boys is told in a manner which I have never seen surpassed."

Blyton's biographer, Barbara Stoney, called the book "an unusual attempt for Enid at social realism".

Mary Cadogan and Patricia Craig, however, in their book, You're a Brick, Angela! (1976), wrote, "This is perhaps Enid Blyton's nastiest story; she has taken, unusually, a 'topical' theme and sentimentalized it, bringing to the problem of juvenile delinquency an attitude dispiritingly retrogressive."

== Editions ==
The Six Bad Boys was first published by Lutterworth Press in 1951, with illustrations by Mary Gernat.

Subsequent editions were published by Armada, and later editions by Beaver, Award, and Bounty, had illustrations by Bob Harvey, and Glenn Steward, with cover illustrations by Leo Hartas, and David Franklin.
