= The Wishing Chair =

The Wishing Chair may refer to:

- The Wishing Chair (album), a 1985 album by alternative rock band 10,000 Maniacs
- The Wishing Chair (series), a series of children's novels by Enid Blyton
