= Tales of Toyland =

1944 novel by Enid Blyton

Tales of Toyland is a standalone novel by Enid Blyton, first published in 1944. The chapters originally appeared in serialised form in Enid Blyton's Sunny Stories magazine in 1942.

Not to be confused with other books by Enid Blyton which have 'Toyland' in the title.

== Summary ==
Jolly, a sailor doll, and Tiptoe, a fairy doll, are both unhappy in the nursery that they live in. None of the other toys in the nursery like them, so they decide to run away to Toyland together. The chapters tell how they make their way to Toyland, and how they start a new life and make new friends when they get there.

== Editions ==
The first edition was published in 1944 by George Newnes, with illustrations by Hilda McGavin, and the second edition was published by Latimer House in 1952, with illustrations by Grace Lodge.

In 1963, the book was re-packaged as Tales of Toyland and Other Stories, and included stories from My Third Enid Blyton Book (1955) as well as the chapters from the original book. It was published by Dean, with illustrations by Grace Lodge and Kathleen M. Gell.
