= The Mistletoe Farm =

Novels by Enid Blyton

- First edition of Six Cousins at Mistletoe Farm, illustrated by Peter Biegel
- Six Cousins at Mistletoe Farm; Six Cousins Again
- Author: Enid Blyton
- Country: United Kingdom
- Language: English
- Genre: Children's literature
- Publisher: Evans Brothers
- Published: 1948 and 1950
- No. of books: 2

The Mistletoe Farm books consist of two novels by children's author Enid Blyton.

The first of the two, Six Cousins at Mistletoe Farm, was published in November 1948 and illustrated by Peter Biegel. The sequel, Six Cousins Again, which shares the same characters as its predecessor, was published in 1950 and illustrated by Maurice Tulloch.

== Plot summary ==
The Longfield family, 15-year-old twins Jane and Jack, 11-year-old Susan, Crackers the spaniel, and Mr. and Mrs. Longfield, live at Mistletoe Farm.

When they receive a phone call from Peter Longfield's brother David who informs the family that his uninsured townhouse has burnt down, they are asked to look after his three children, 16-year-old Cyril, 14-year-old Melisande and 10 or 11-year old Roderick. The Mistletoe Farm children are initially alarmed of the prospect of their three spoilt cousins from the city living with them, and at first they find it difficult to get along with each other. But after a number of challenges and hardships affect Mistletoe Farm, the city of Longfields learn to adapt to life in the country and get along with their cousins.

In the second book, Six Cousins Again, Cyril, Melisande and Roderick have moved into a nearby, much more modern farm with their parents. Their mother, Rose, has difficulty adapting to the life of a farmer's wife, their father, David, has various setbacks, and the children have trouble settling down. Atypically severe for Blyton's work, the book contains numerous references to the deaths of animals. It is also, like much of her oeuvre, responsible for any of Holly Farm's problems not caused by Rose's unwillingness to sacrifice her life to the farm.
