= The Circus Series =

Novel series by Enid Blyton

- First editions
- Mr Galliano's Circus; Hurrah for the Circus!; Circus Days Again
- Author: Enid Blyton
- Cover artist: E. H. Davie
- Country: United Kingdom
- Language: English
- Genre: Children's literature
- Published: 1938–42
- No. of books: 3

The Circus Series is a three-book series by British children's author Enid Blyton.

== Plot ==
The Circus Series begins with Mr Galliano's Circus, where the protagonist is Jimmy Brown. The story starts with how Jimmy and his parents join the circus, where Jimmy's Dad gets a job as a handyman. Then Jimmy's affinity with animals brings into his life 'Lucky' the dog. The story revolves around Jimmy, his parents, his dog Lucky and the others like Lotta, who work in the circus. Lotta is a small girl who rides horses. The other characters include Lilliput, the man with the monkeys; Stanley, the clown; Mr Tonks, the owner of Jumbo the Elephant; and Lotta's parents, Lal and Laddo.

In the second book Hurrah for the Circus and the third Circus Days Again, Mr Galliano's famous circus is getting bigger and better all the time. Madame Prunella joins the show with her talking parrots, and so do three new clowns (Twinkle, Pippi and Google), a performing seal and twelve zebras. But everything starts to go wrong when a new ringmaster arrives, and at last Jimmy and Lotta, the circus children, decide that something must be done.

== Books ==
In chronological order, the three books of the series are:

- Mr Galliano's Circus (1938)
- Hurrah for the Circus (1939)
- Circus Days Again (1942)

One further Galliano story - A Circus Adventure was published in the Sunny Stories magazine and reprinted in Enid Blyton's Omnibus (published in 1952).

Blyton also wrote other (unrelated) books set in a circus, including Come to the Circus! and The Circus of Adventure.
