= The Secret Series (Enid Blyton) =

Series of adventure novels by Enid Blyton

First edition of The Secret Island (publ. Basil Blackwell, 1938) Cover art by E. H. Davie

The Secret Series is a series of adventure novels written by Enid Blyton. There are five books, as follows:

- The Secret Island
- The Secret of Spiggy Holes
- The Secret Mountain
- The Secret of Killimooin (Retitled as The Secret Forest)
- The Secret of Moon Castle

A sixth book in the series, The Secret Valley, was written by Trevor J. Bolton and published by Award in 2009.

The series was made into a television serial by Cloud 9 Screen Entertainment in 1996.

== The main series ==
Here are brief summaries of each story:

=== The Secret Island ===
Peggy and her younger twin siblings, Mike and Nora, are living with a harsh aunt and uncle after their parents are thought to have been killed in a plane crash. In this first adventure, aided by Jack (a local orphan boy), they run away to live on a deserted island on a nearby lake. They build a house made with the branches of a willow tree, and bring a cow and some chickens across, to provide milk and eggs.

They adapt well to life on the island. However, some day-trippers visit and nearly discover them. The local police are also still looking for them and Jack is almost caught when he goes ashore to sell produce at a local market.

Eventually the children are found by the police, and it is revealed that their parents have survived the plane crash. They return home, and the parents adopt Jack.

The novel was originally written as a serial, being published as a full-length novel in 1938. It was one of Enid Blyton's earliest adventure novels, preceding The Famous Five, The Five Find-Outers, The Adventure Series, The Secret Seven, and school books which would appear in following years.

=== The Secret of Spiggy Holes ===
The children, reunited with their parents again (and Jack now adopted as part of the family), go on holiday at the rugged Cornish coast with a family friend, Miss Dimity ("Dimmy", appears in several further books in the series), and get drawn into a kidnapping case as they discover a boy being held prisoner in a castle tower nearby.

The boy turns out to be the Prince of Baronia, Paul, whom they rescue in due course, and protect as the kidnappers come after him in pursuit. Baronia is a small, remote kingdom of unspecified location (possibly eastern European), and Paul is heir to the throne. The Arnold children become firm friends with Paul during this adventure, and he appears in each of the remaining books in the series.

In the course of the pursuit by the kidnappers, eager to get hold of him again, the five children visit the Secret Island from the previous book again, and hide there for some time. Paul's father, the King of Baronia, is very grateful to Paul's friends for rescuing him and then looking after him so well, and so impressed with Britain generally that he decides to send Paul to an English boarding school – the same one that Mike and Jack attend.

=== The Secret Mountain ===
Captain and Mrs. Arnold are flying off in their plane, the White Swallow, and apparently have crash-landed in a remote part of Africa. The children, home from school and in the care of Dimmy, team up with Prince Paul, and go flying off in his royal plane to Africa (together with Paul's loyal and devoted courtiers, Ranni and Pilescu) to rescue the Arnolds – and get tangled up with a strange and secretive African tribe with flaming red hair and living within secret tunnels and caves inside a mountain.

Along the way they befriend the black African boy Mafumu, who acts as a guide, and without whose help they would never have succeeded in their mission. A total solar eclipse plays a crucial role in their efforts to escape imprisonment by the tribal people.

=== The Secret of Killimooin (Retitled as The Secret Forest) ===
Prince Paul, still attending the same boarding school as Jack and Mike, invites his four friends to his palace in Baronia for the holidays; but it is so hot there in the roasting summer that the entire royal household adjourns to their castle up in the mountains. Bands of robbers are marauding the countryside, terrorising the local people with their savagery, and Paul is incensed, and determined to find the robbers and have them detained – and, together with his friends, sets out to do this.

They discover a secret tunnel in a cave on the mountainside which leads to an underground river, which eventually flows into a secret forest which is entirely inaccessible from outside, owing to being entirely surrounded by immensely tall cliffs and mountains which are completely impassable. It turns out the robbers live here, and only they know the secret tunnel leading into the forest – which is why no-one has been able to detect them for years.

After falling into the hands of the aforementioned robbers, the children go through many adventures in their efforts to escape from the mountain.

Their efforts are not helped, either, by the raging storm which has caused the flow of water in the underground stream to rise higher and higher. Will they escape the tunnel in time?

=== The Secret of Moon Castle ===
Prince Paul's family are visiting England and wish to rent a castle to stay in for several weeks, and Mrs. Arnold has been asked to help locate a suitable castle, knowing England far better than Paul's parents. The Arnolds are invited to spend some time in the castle with them, too, and are soon puzzled by strange events happening in the castle: odd noises that occur, eyes in portraits that shine mysteriously, lights that shine in tower rooms, despite being locked tight. It seems that there are unknown people who do not want them to stay in the castle.

On occasion, a strange tingling effect is felt by them, and strange coloured lights seem to rise from the ground, and it seems to be due to a strange metal (possibly radioactive) that mysterious men are mining for unknown reasons.

=== The Secret Valley ===
Paul invites his friends to Baronia once again, and they are camped near a secret airfield where new Baronian aircraft are being tested with the help of Captain Arnold; but there seem to be unknown enemies who are seeking to sabotage this work, and this seems to be connected with a remote, inaccessible valley that the children stumble into almost by accident.
