= Richard Pearce (actor) =

British voice actor (born 9 July 1961)

- Born: 9 July 1961
- Occupation: Voice actor
- Years active: 1987–present

Richard Pearce (born 9 July 1961) is a British voice actor. Pearce has appeared in over 500 radio dramas and was twice a member of the BBC Radio drama company. He played opposite Sir John Gielgud in Tales My Father Taught Me and in a variety of radio parts ranging from The Mekon in Dan Dare to the last castrato in The Angel of Rome. In 1992 and 1993, Pearce appeared in the BBC Radio adaptation of The Adventures of Tintin, playing the eponymous hero. His other audio work includes Kenneth Branagh's Romeo and Juliet (Renaissance), The Taming of the Shrew (BBC), Hamlet (Naxos), The Skull Beneath The Skin by PD James (BBC), Oliver Twist (BBC), A Woman of No Importance (Penguin), and two of BBC audio's highest selling audio series: The Adventures of Tintin (in which he voiced the title character) and Doctor Who, playing Jeremy Fitzoliver, a semi-regular companion to the Third Doctor in two specially commissioned radio serials (The Paradise of Death and The Ghosts of N-Space).

Pearce was the voice of Douglas in Douglas and Vince: The Two Heroes (BBC), Budgie in Budgie the Little Helicopter (ITV), Dennis the Menace (BBC), Incy Wincy the Spider (Pop!) and Oswald (Nick Jr. and Channel 5, UK dub). In addition, he has appeared in The Wishing Chair (BBC) as Peter, The Faraway Tree (BBC) as Joe, as Nadim in The Magic Key (BBC), Numbertime (BBC), Agrippine (Channel 5), Woof Woof the dog in MacDonald's Farm (ITV), and two characters Alexander and Rufus in The Forgotten Toys (ITV), as well as appearances in Shakespeare: The Animated Tales (S4C). He is currently the voice of Spot the Dog

Pearce provided the voice to audiobooks including Arman's Journey, Old Hall New Hall, The Happy Numbers of Julius Miles and The Girl in White.

His other work includes Decline and Fall, The Mekon, Moonfleet, and Testament: The Bible in Animation.

Pearce's voice roles in video games include Bjorn and Trent in Everybody's Golf: World Tour. He also voiced Prince Charmles in Dragon Quest VIII

In 2017, Pearce produced and designed a tribute to the actress Susan Sheridan featuring sonnets recorded by voice actors including Miriam Margolyes and Tim Bentinck. Pearce reads Sonnet 14.
