= Donia Nachshen =

Ukrainian artist (1903–1987)

- Born: Donia Esther Nachshen; 22 January 1903; Zhitomir, Russian Empire (now Ukraine)
- Died: 1987 (aged 83–84)
- Education: Slade School of Fine Art
- Known for: Illustration and poster art

Donia Esther Nachshen (22 January 1903 – 1987) was a Ukrainian-born British book illustrator and poster artist who is now best known for the posters she produced for the British government during World War Two.

== Biography ==
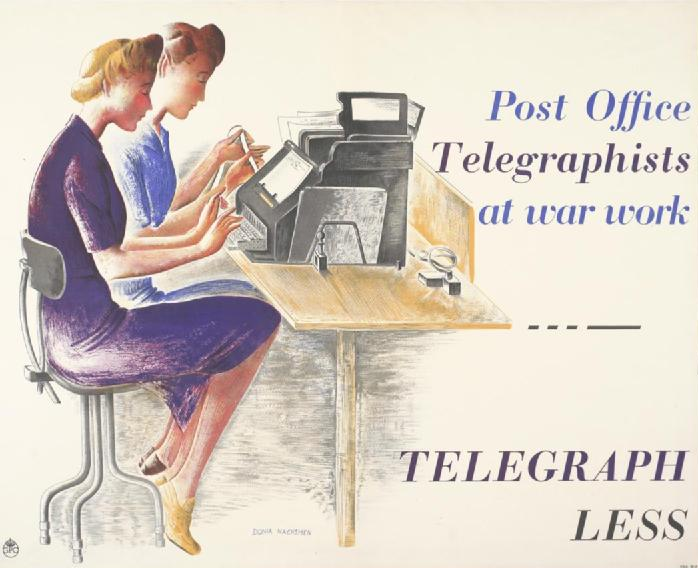
Telegraph Less (1943) (Art.IWM PST 4041)

Nachshen was born in the city of Zhitomir, which was then part of Russia and is now in Ukraine. Nachshen was born into a Jewish family and after an anti-Jewish pogrom in the city in 1905, the family fled Zhitomir and eventually settled in London. Nachshen did well at school in London and enrolled in the Slade School of Art. By the 1920s she had established herself as a successful book designer. She illustrated translations of works by Arthur Schnitzler and the Nobel Prize winner Anatole France in a style based on Russian folk art and art deco elements. Nachshen illustrated a version of the Jewish text the Haggadah in 1934 and also illustrated editions of works by Oscar Wilde and Samuel Butler. She also produced illustrations for the Radio Times.

During World War Two, Nachshen produced poster designs for a number of high-profile campaigns, notably the Make Do and Mend campaign run by the Board of Trade and also Telegraph Less for the General Post Office. She continued with her book illustration work during the War, producing designs for versions of "Diary of a Madman" by Nikolai Gogol and a 1945 collection of short stories by Fyodor Dostoyevsky as well as books by Enid Blyton. After the War, Nachshen lived in London and continued to illustrate Russian novels and poetry, mainly for the publishers Constable & Co and also for the Lindsay Drummond company. For the Russian novels, Nachshen used scraperboard to create dramatic illustrations that resembled a style of eastern European woodcuts, while for the children's book that she illustrated she used much lighter pen drawings.

== Books illustrated ==
Books illustrated by Nachshen include,

- The Works of Anatole France by Anatole France, (Bodley Head, 1925)
- Topsy Turvy by Vernon Bartlett, (1927)
- Rhapsody by Arthur Schnitzler, (Constable, 1928)
- Fraulein Else by Arthur Schnitzler, (Constable, 1929)
- The Red Lily by Anatole France, (Bodley Head, 1930)
- Out of Childhood by Irina Odoevtzeva, (Constable, 1930)
- The Works of Oscar Wilde by Oscar Wilde, (Collins, [1931])
- The Haggadah (1934)
- The Way of All Flesh by Samuel Butler, (Cape, 1936)
- Enid Blyton's Nature Lover's Book by Enid Blyton, (Evans Brothers, 1944)
- Black Night, Red Morning by Geoffrey Trease, (1944)
- Diary of a Madman / Nevsky Prospekt by Nikolai Gogol, (Drummond, 1945)
- Three Tales by Fyodor Dostoyevsky, (Drummond, 1945)
- The Spirit of Music by Alexander Blok, (Drummond, 1946)
- Tales of Bielkin by Alexander Pushkin, (Drummond, 1947)
- Pushkin, Lermontov, Tyutchev; Poems (Drummond, 1947)
- Poems in Prose by Ivan Turgenev, (Drummond)
