= The Wishing-Chair (series) =

Series of children's stories by Enid Blyton

The Wishing Chair
- First edition of Adventures of the Wishing-Chair, illustrated by Hilda McGavin
- Adventures of the Wishing-Chair (1937); The Wishing-Chair Again (1950); More Wishing-Chair Stories (2000)
- Author: Enid Blyton
- Country: United Kingdom
- Language: English
- Genre: Children's fiction, fantasy
- Published in English: 1937–2000
- No. of books: 3

The Wishing-Chair is a series of two novels by the English author Enid Blyton, and a third book published in 2000 compiled from Blyton's short stories. The three children's stories are as follows:

- Adventures of the Wishing-Chair, 1937 (publ. George Newnes, illustrated by Hilda McGavin)
- The Wishing-Chair Again, 1950 (publ. George Newnes, illustrated by Hilda McGavin)
- More Wishing-Chair Stories, 2000 (publ. Mammoth, illustrated by Anthony Lewis)

The first book, Adventures of the Wishing-Chair, is Enid Blyton's first full-length novel — although it is episodic in nature. A TV series was made in 1998 as part of Enid Blytons Enchanted Lands.

== Adventures of the Wishing-Chair ==
Mollie and Peter, searching for a birthday present for their mother, find a mysterious antiques shop which appears to be run by fairy folk. There, they find a magic Wishing-Chair with the power to grow wings and fly. After the chair rescues them from the shop, and gets them home, they decide to keep the chair in their playroom. On their first adventure, they rescue a pixie called Chinky (renamed to Binky in revised editions and Jigs in the TV series) from a giant. The pixie comes to live in their playroom, and the remainder of the book concerns the adventures of the children, as the chair takes them, and Chinky to various magical places.

== The Wishing-Chair Again ==
It's the first day of the summer holidays and Peter and Mollie are dying to go on more adventures with their Wishing-Chair. Peter inadvertently asks to go to the land of "Goodness-Knows-Where", but in the process of going there the Wishing-Chair is stolen. They eventually get it back and a few days later, the Wishing-Chair only grows three wings. They end up in the Land of Slipperies and when Peter offends one of them, they retaliate by chopping all the chair's wings off, so they get some ointment which grows the wings back.

On the next rainy day, they inadvertently grow wings on their toys and the toys end up at Mr Grim's school where mischievous brownies are sent. They befriend a brownie called Winks and successfully get Mr Grim to relinquish the toys. Winks takes up residence in Peter and Mollie's house and they take him on adventures, but on the last day of the holidays, he is sent back to Mr Grim's school for being too naughty.

== More Wishing-Chair Stories ==
In this final book, Mollie and Peter are home for the half-term holiday and Chinky (or Binky) and the Wishing-Chair are ready to fly away with them to magical lands. They visit the Land of Wishes, the Land of Scally-Wags and help Santa Claus deliver presents on Christmas Eve.

Published in 2000, the book is a compilation of stories made up from removed chapters of the previous books as well as material from Sunny Stories and Enid Blyton's Omnibus!

== Television adaptation ==
In 1997 and 1998, Abbey Home Entertainment, Cosgrove Hall Films and PolyGram Visual Programming produced an animated television series that aired on the CBBC block on BBC One and BBC Choice, entitled Enid Blyton's Enchanted Lands. The series based on stories from The Wishing Chair and The Faraway Tree.

A selection of episodes, "The Ho Ho Wizard", "The Grabbit Gnomes", "Poor Lost Jigs", "The Land of Dreams", "The Disappearing Islands", "The Magician's Party" and "The Chair Clowns About" were later released on VHS and DVD. The complete series was later released on VHS in 1999 on 2 separate tapes with 6 other episodes added which included: "The Invisible Chair", "The Great Escape", "The Snoogle", "The Slipperies", "The Land of Goodies" and "Mr Spells and the Wandering Castle".

The voice cast were: Richard Pearce, Julia Harrison-Jones, Mark Channon, Nigel Pelgram, Adrienne Posta and David Holt.
