= Dorothy M. Wheeler =

English illustrator

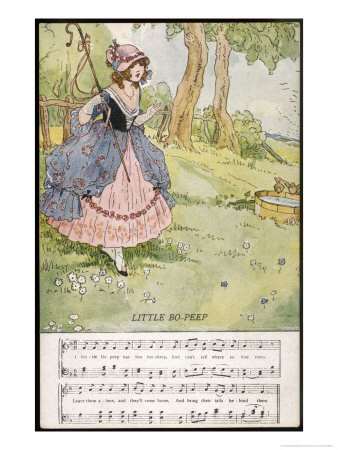
Little Bo Peep

Dorothy Muriel Wheeler (1891–1966) was an English illustrator. She studied at the Blackheath School of Art, where her principal media were watercolour and ink. She designed children's book illustrations, postcards and comic strips.

A series of her works were used by Bamforth & Co Ltd, a publisher of fine postcards, for their Woodland Secrets and Fairy Series collections of cards, published around 1920. Her illustrations appeared in Enid Blyton's widely published children's books. They also appeared in books by Anne MacDonald. She published her own version of the Three Little Pigs in 1955. Her final work appeared in 1965, illustrations for Enid Blyton's The Ring O'Bells Mystery.

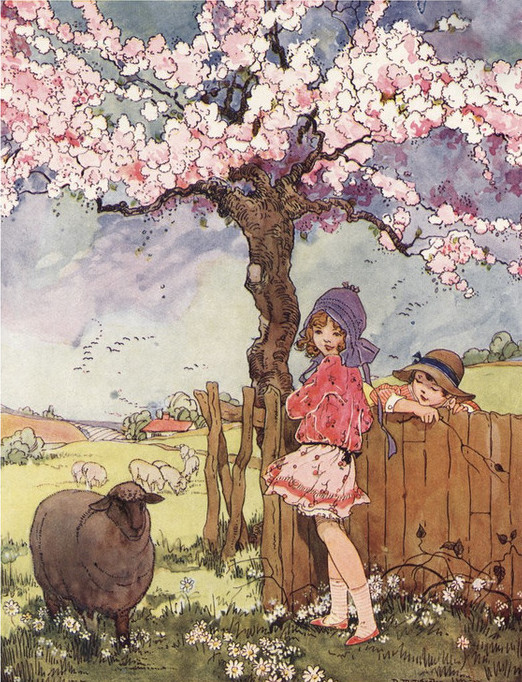
Baa Baa Black Sheep

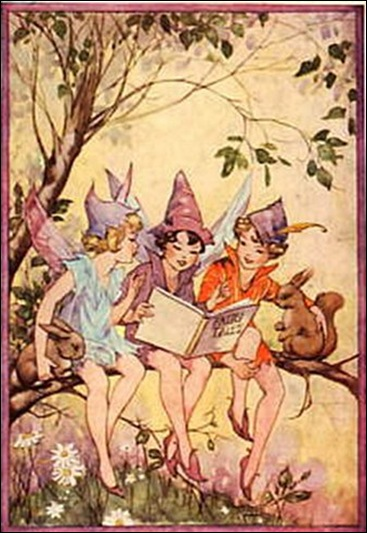
A Fairy Tale

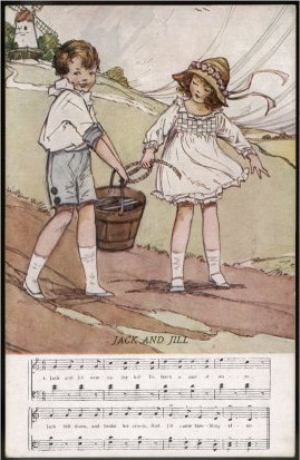
Jack and Jill

== Books Illustrated by Dorothy M. Wheeler ==
books written by Enid Blyton:

- The Enchanted Wood, first published in 1939 by Enid Blyton
- The Little Tree-House, first published in 1939 by George Newnes
- The Further Adventures of Josie, Click and Bun, first published in 1941 by George Newnes
- The Adventures of Mr. Pink-Whistle, first published in 1941 by George Newnes
- Five o'Clock Tales, first published in 1942 by Methuen
- Six o'Clock Tales, first published in 1942 by Methuen
- The Magic Faraway Tree, first published in 1943 by Enid Blyton
- Seven o'Clock Tales, first published in 1943 by Methuen
- Dame Slap and Her School, first published in 1943 by George Newnes
- Eight o'Clock Tales, first published in 1944 by Methuen
- The Folk of the Faraway Tree, first published in 1946 by George Newnes
- Josie, Click and Bun Again, first published in 1946 by George Newnes
- More About Josie, Click and Bun, first published in 1948 by George Newnes
- Bumpy and His Bus, first published in 1949 by George Newnes
- Mr. Tumpy and His Caravan, first published in 1949 by Sidgwick & Jackson
- Mr. Pink-Whistle Interferes, first published in 1950 by George Newnes
- Sunny Stories Calendar 1951, first published in 1950 by George Newnes
- Up the Faraway Tree, first published in 1951 by George Newnes
- Welcome, Josie, Click and Bun!, first published in 1952 by George Newnes
- Mandy, Mops and Cubby Find A House, first published in 1952 by Sampson Low
- Mr. Tumpy Plays a Trick on Saucepan, first Published in 1952 by Sampson Low
- Mandy, Mops and Cubby Again, first published in 1953 by Sampson Low
- Mandy Makes Cubby A Hat, first published in 1953 by Sampson Low
- Mr. Tumpy in the Land of Wishes, first published in 1953 by Sampson Low
- Mr. Tumpy in the Land of Boys and Girls, first published in 1953 by Sampson Low
- Mandy, Mops and Cubby and the Whitewash, First Published in 1955 by Sampson Low
- Mr. Pink-Whistle's Party, first published in 1955 by George Newnes
- Mr. Pink-Whistle's Big Book, first published in 1958 by Evans Brothers
- The Ring O'Bells Mystery, first published in 1965

other books

- English Nursery Rhymes by Lavinia Edna Walter, first published in 1916
- Through the Green Door by Anne MacDonald, first published in 1924
- A Pocketful of Silver by Anne Macdonald, first published in 1927
- Sung By The Sea by Anne MacDonald, first published in 1929
- The Three Little Pigs by Dorothy M. Wheeler, first published in 1951
