= Cococubs =

Cococubs were a set of 32 hollowcast hand-painted lead figures of anthropomorphic creatures given away with Cadburys Bournville Cocoa from 1934 to 1939. They were designed by the commercial artist and prolific illustrator of children's books, Ernest Aris

The free gifts were available just as Britain was coming out of the Great Depression where few families had spare income to indulge their children with toys. The scheme was a huge success, and within a few weeks of the campaign Cadburys ran out of the supplies of both the drinking chocolate and the Cococubs. It was only after a delay of two months that supplies were again on sale.

It was hailed by the Grocery Merchants Journal as "One of the cleverest publicity schemes of the year. It is difficult to over-estimate the sales value of such a scheme." Some 300,000 children subsequently joined the Cococub Club, which issued a 'Newspaper' to its members together with a badge and membership card.
