= The Faraway Tree =

Series of children's novels by Enid Blyton

- The Enchanted Wood; The Magic Faraway Tree; The Folk of the Faraway Tree; Up the Faraway Tree
- Author: Enid Blyton
- Cover artist: Dorothy M. Wheeler (first edition); Georgina Hargreaves (infobox image edition)
- Country: United Kingdom
- Language: English
- Genre: Fantasy
- Publisher: Newnes
- Published: 1939–1951
- No. of books: 4

The Faraway Tree is a series of popular novels for children by British author Enid Blyton. The titles in the series are The Enchanted Wood (1939), The Magic Faraway Tree (1943), The Folk of the Faraway Tree (1946) and Up the Faraway Tree (1951).

The stories take place in an enchanted wood in which a gigantic magical tree grows – the eponymous 'Faraway Tree'. The tree is so tall that its topmost branches reach into the clouds and it is wide enough to contain small houses carved into its trunk. The wood and the tree are discovered by three children who move into a house nearby. They befriend many of the residents and have adventures in magical lands that visit the top of the tree.

== Books ==
The first title of the main trilogy, The Enchanted Wood, was published in 1939, although the Faraway Tree and Moon-Face had already made a brief appearance in 1936 in The Yellow Fairy Book. A picture-strip book, Up the Faraway Tree, was published in 1951. Over the years, the Faraway Tree stories have been illustrated by various artists including Dorothy M. Wheeler (first editions), Rene Cloke, Janet and Anne Grahame Johnstone, and Georgina Hargreaves.

=== The Enchanted Wood ===
First edition, 1939

First edition, 1943

First edition, 1946

In the first novel in the series, Jo, Bessie and Fanny (edited to Joe, Beth and Fran in revised editions) move to live near a large forest, which the locals call "The Enchanted Wood". One day they go for a walk in the wood and discover it really is enchanted. They encounter a group of elves who have been robbed of important papers by a gnome. They chase the gnome and recover the papers, but the gnome himself escapes up a huge tree whose branches seem to reach into the clouds. It is the Faraway Tree.

Against the elves' advice, the children climb the Faraway Tree. They discover that it is inhabited by magical people, including Moon-Face, Silky, The Saucepan Man, Dame Washalot, Mr Watzisname, and the Angry Pixie, whose houses are carved into the trunk. They befriend some of these people, in particular Moon-Face and Silky. At the very top of the tree they discover a ladder which leads them to a magical land which is different on each visit, because each place moves on from the top of the tree to make way for a new land. The children are free to come and go, but they must leave before the land moves on, or they will be stuck there until that same land returns to the Faraway Tree. In various chapters, one of the children gets stuck in the land.

The lands at the top are sometimes unpleasant, such as the Land of Dame Slap, a strict school teacher, and sometimes enjoyable, such as the Land of Goodies, the Land of Take-What-You-Want, and the Land of Do-As-You-Please.

The first land the three children visit is the Roundabout Land, in which everything turns constantly. They encounter a pair of rabbits, who dig a hole for the children to help them escape the land when they discover that the hole back to the tree had closed up after the ground turned above it. After several more adventures, the people of the Faraway Tree need the children's help when they are invaded by an army of Red Goblins. The last land they visit in the book is the Land of Birthdays, where the brownies and the inhabitants of the Faraway Tree celebrate Bessie's birthday.

=== The Magic Faraway Tree ===
Jo, Bessie and Fanny take their cousin Rick to the magic Faraway Tree, where he meets Moon-Face, Silky the fairy and Saucepan Man, and visits all the different lands at the top of the Faraway Tree.

=== The Folk of the Faraway Tree ===
Connie, a spoilt and stuck-up girl, comes to stay for the summer with the three children while her mother is sick. At first, Connie refuses to believe in the Faraway Tree or the magical folk who live in it, even when the Angry Pixie throws ink at her and when Dame Washalot soaks her. When the children visit the lands at the top of the tree, Connie gets a few surprises. The Saucepan Man's mother decides to live in the tree, leaving her job as a baker in Dame Slap's land. She sets up a surprising cake shop in the tree.

=== Up the Faraway Tree ===
Unlike the first three books in the series, the work is not a novel, but a series of illustrations with short text underneath. The plot follows two new children, Robin and Joy, who have read The Enchanted Wood and want to join in the adventures. They go to the wood to meet Jo, Bessie and Fanny and meet some of the wood's residents, including Silky and Moon Face.

== Characters ==
The main characters are Jo, Bessie and Fanny (updated in recent revisions to Joe, Beth and Fran), who are three siblings. Fanny is the youngest, Bessie is next in age and Jo is their big brother. They live near the Enchanted Wood and are friends of the residents of the Faraway Tree. Other characters include:

- The Angry Pixie, who lives in a house with a tiny window and has a habit of throwing cold water or any liquid at hand over people who dare to peep inside;
- The barn owl, who lives in the house next to the Angry Pixie's. He is a friend of Silky's;
- Silky is so named because of her long, golden hair. She is one of the regular companions of the children when they go up the Tree to other worlds. Throughout the books, Silky is referred to as both an elf and a pixie. (When the children first meet Silky, she is described as an elf: ″At that moment the yellow door opened and a small elf looked out.″ Yet in the fourth book by Blyton, Up The Faraway Tree, Silky is introduced to Robin and Joy as a pixie: ″So Joy knocked—and the door flew open, and there stood little Silky the pixie...″) and in the BBC tv series, she's a small fairy.
- Mr Watzisname cannot remember his name. He sleeps and snores all the time. During a particular story at the Land of Secrets, Mr Watzisname discovers his name, Kollamoolitumarellipawkyrollo, then forgets it almost immediately as it is so long;
- Dame Washalot, who spends her time washing her clothes and throwing the dirty wash-water down the tree. If she has no clothes to wash, she washes the dirty laundry of other people and even the leaves of the Faraway Tree;
- Moon-Face is so named for his round face that looks like the moon. His house is similarly round and is filled with curved furniture. He is the owner of the slippery-slip, a slide which starts in the middle of his house which lets you slide down to the bottom of the Faraway Tree instead of climbing down. It is used as a means of exiting the tree and has played an important part in some of the adventures, where others have sought control of the tree or their rooms. In the cartoon series, he resembles Porky Pig from the Looney Tunes series. In the 2026 film, his crescent moon is on top of his head, serving as a hat.
- The Saucepan Man, who lives with Mr Watzisname. His name stems from the fact that he is covered all over with saucepans and kettles. Sometimes, he cannot understand what his friends are saying because he is partially deaf, which is further aggravated by all the noise from the pans and kettles which he carries all the time. The Saucepan Man earlier appeared in another, lesser-known Blyton book, The Book of Brownies (aka Brownie Tales), helping the travellers out of one of their many bouts of trouble on their journey;
- The Saucepan Man's mother, who lives with Dame Washalot after The Folk of the Faraway Tree. She runs a cake shop;
- Dame Slap, who runs a school for bad pixies which, in some of the adventures, the friends accidentally land in. Her name has been updated in later revisions of the book to Dame Snap. The 2026 film references this change when she says she used to be called Dame Slap because she slapped her students, but changed her name to Snap after she was forbidden from slapping them.

== Updates ==
In modern reprints, the names of some of the characters have been changed. Jo has been changed to Joe, the more common spelling for males, and Bessie is now Beth, the former name having fallen out of use as a nickname for Elizabeth. Fanny and Dick have been renamed Frannie and Rick because in some countries the former names are now widely used as slang terms for genitalia and buttocks.

The supporting character Dame Slap has also become Dame Snap, and no longer practises corporal punishment but instead reprimands her pupils by shouting at them.

Entire passages of the original have been rewritten to remove references to fighting. For instance, when the tree is taken over by Goblins in The Enchanted Wood, the Goblins were originally fought off, with descriptions of Mr Watzisname 'pummelling them as if he were beating carpets' and the Saucepan Man throwing his saucepans at them. These have been replaced with cursory references to 'chasing'.

Some of the changes were criticised in a review by Alison Flood.

== Continuations by other authors ==
Silky's Story by Jeanne Willis, 2020.

Moonface's Story by Emily Lamm, 2021 (picture book).

The Magic Faraway Tree: A New Adventure by Jacqueline Wilson was published in May 2022.

The Magic Faraway Tree: A Christmas Adventure by Jacqueline Wilson published in October 2023, continues the story of Milo, Mia and Birdy from Wilson's earlier book.

== Adaptations ==
=== Film ===
In October 2014, it was announced that the books will be adapted for the cinema for the first time and are being developed for a live action film version by Sam Mendes' production company, Neal Street Productions. As of 2021, the film was still listed as being "in development".

In May 2024, it was announced that the film adaptation, under the script of Simon Farnaby and direction by Ben Gregor, will star Andrew Garfield and Claire Foy. The film was released in the United Kingdom on 27 March 2026 and was released in the United States on 21 August 2026.

=== Television ===
In 1997, stories from the novels were adapted into animated ten-minute episodes for the TV series Enid Blyton's Enchanted Lands which was produced by Cosgrove Hall Films and aired on Children's BBC and CBBC on Choice. The series, entitled Enchanted Lands: The Magic of the Faraway Tree had 13 episodes:

1. The Land of Toys
2. The Land of Take What You Want
3. The Land of Dame Tickle
4. The Land of Ice And Snow
5. The Land of Dreams
6. The Land of Spells
7. The Land of Marvels
8. The Land of Know Alls
9. The Land of Secrets
10. The Land of Topsy Turvy
11. The Rocking Land
12. The Land of Wizards
13. The Land of Giants

Voices: Roy Hudd, Richard Pearce, Kate Harbour, John Baddeley, Jimmy Hibbert, Janet James, and David Holt.
