= Hilda Boswell =

British illustrator and writer of children's books

Hilda Boswell (1903–1976) was a British illustrator and writer of children’s books.

== Life ==
She was born in London in 1903, the daughter of an architect, and studied at Hornsey School of Art and Regent Street Polytechnic. Her preferred medium was watercolour, and she admired the work of Beatrix Potter, Kate Greenaway and Arthur Rackham. She took an interest in the countryside, and enjoyed reading and gardening.

In the 1930s, Boswell began drawing adventure picture strips for the comics of Amalgamated Press. Her longest running feature was Strongheart, based on the canine film star of the same name. The series had been originated by G W Backhouse in 1927, and Boswell worked on it from 1939, first for the weekly comic Crackers and later for Jingles.

== Books ==
Boswell’s first book is believed to be Edward and Gumbo, published in 1943. Amongst her best known works are the dust jackets she produced for Enid Blyton’s “flower” and “holiday” book series during the 1940s and 1950s. Boswell illustrated a popular 1963 edition of Robert Louis Stevenson’s A Child's Garden of Verses, while her own books included The Little Birthday Horse published in 1950 and Little Crazy Car published in 1965. Hilda Boswell’s Treasury of Nursery Rhymes, published by Collins in 1960, was the first in her “treasury” series of titles, which also included a Treasury of Fairy Tales and a Treasury of Poetry.

== Death ==
Hilda Boswell died in London in 1976.
