= Mary Mouse =

Fictional character

- Mary Mouse and the Dolls' House; More Adventures of Mary Mouse; Little Mary Mouse Again; Hello, Little Mary Mouse; Mary Mouse and Her Family; Here Comes Mary Mouse Again; How Do You Do, Mary Mouse; We Do Love Mary Mouse; Welcome, Mary Mouse; Hurrah for Mary Mouse; A Prize for Mary Mouse; Mary Mouse and Her Bicycle; Mary Mouse and the Noah's Ark; Mary Mouse to the Rescue; Mary Mouse in Nursery Rhyme Land; A Day with Mary Mouse; Mary Mouse and the Garden Party; Mary Mouse Goes to the Fair; Mary Mouse Has a Wonderful Idea; Mary Mouse Goes to Sea; Mary Mouse Goes Out for the Day; Fun with Mary Mouse; Mary Mouse and the Little Donkey
- Author: Enid Blyton
- Illustrator: Olive F. Openshaw (first fifteen books), Frederick White (next six books) and R. Paul-Hoye (last two books)
- Country: United Kingdom
- Language: English
- Genre: Children's fiction
- Published: 1942–1964
- No. of books: 23

Mary Mouse is a fictional character "imagined" by Enid Blyton, a prolific British children's author, in the mid 20th century. Mary Mouse is a mouse exiled from her mousehole who becomes a maid at the dolls' house, employed by Sailor Doll.

The original publications were in an unusual format, 15 cm × 7 cm (6 in × 2 3/4 in) softback pictorial. Due to the austerity and paper shortages of the times, during and after World War II, the first editions were cheaply made with simple colour illustration and stapled bindings overstuck with linen edging.

Loved mainly by girls, this character's memory has lived on. The original books (published by Brockhampton Press of Leicester at a price of one shilling) are highly collectable, perhaps because few remain in reasonable condition. The books were immensely popular in Blyton's days and eventually sold one million copies.

== Books ==
1. Mary Mouse and the Dolls' House (1942), illustrated by Olive F. Openshaw
2. More Adventures of Mary Mouse (1943), illustrated by Olive F. Openshaw
3. Little Mary Mouse Again (1944), illustrated by Olive F. Openshaw
4. Hallo, Little Mary Mouse (1945), illustrated by Olive F. Openshaw
5. Mary Mouse and Her Family (1946), illustrated by Olive F. Openshaw
6. Here Comes Mary Mouse Again (1947), illustrated by Olive F. Openshaw
7. How Do You Do, Mary Mouse (1948), illustrated by Olive F. Openshaw
8. We Do Love Mary Mouse (1950), illustrated by Olive F. Openshaw
9. Welcome, Mary Mouse (1950), illustrated by Olive F. Openshaw
10. Hurrah for Mary Mouse (1951), illustrated by Olive F. Openshaw
11. A Prize for Mary Mouse (1951), illustrated by Olive F. Openshaw
12. Mary Mouse and Her Bicycle (1952), illustrated by Olive F. Openshaw
13. Mary Mouse and the Noah's Ark (1952), illustrated by Olive F. Openshaw
14. Mary Mouse to the Rescue (1954), illustrated by Olive F. Openshaw
15. Mary Mouse in Nursery Rhyme Land (1955), illustrated by Olive F. Openshaw
16. A Day with Mary Mouse (1956), illustrated by Frederick White
17. Mary Mouse and the Garden Party (1957), illustrated by Frederick White
18. Mary Mouse Goes to the Fair (1958), illustrated by Frederick White
19. Mary Mouse Has a Wonderful Idea (1959), illustrated by Frederick White
20. Mary Mouse Goes to Sea (1960), illustrated by Frederick White
21. Mary Mouse Goes Out for the Day (1961), illustrated by Frederick White
22. Fun with Mary Mouse (1962), illustrated by R. Paul-Hoye
23. Mary Mouse and the Little Donkey (1964), illustrated by R. Paul-Hoye
