= Old Thatch series =

Children's literature book series

The Old Thatch series is a book series by Enid Blyton, her first published series. The first book, The Talking Teapot and Other Tales, appeared in 1934. The books are very short and aimed at younger children.

== List of books ==
The following books have been identified as a part of the Old Thatch series. Some of the entries may be considered a part of different series, also by Thatch, as her books were sometimes republished under different imprints or formats.

- Blyton, Enid (1934), The Talking Teapot and Other Stories, W. & A. K. Johnston
- ——— (1934), Hop, Skip and Jump, W. & A. K. Johnston
- ——— (1934), The Strange Tale of Mr. Wumble, W. & A. K. Johnston
- ——— (1934), Brer Rabbit Retold, W. & A. K. Johnston
- ——— (1935), The Little Button-Elves, W. & A. K. Johnston
- ——— (1935), The Adventures of Bobs, W. & A. K. Johnston
- ——— (1935), Animals at Home, W. & A. K. Johnston
- ——— (1935), Birds at Home, W. & A. K. Johnston
- ——— (1937), Brer Rabbit and His Friends, W. & A. K. Johnston
- ——— (1937), Round the Year Stories, W. & A. K. Johnston
- ——— (1937), A Book of Magic, W. & A. K. Johnston
- ——— (1937), The Two Sillies and Other Stories, W. & A. K. Johnston
- ——— (1938), The Watchman with 100 Eyes and Other Greek Tales, W. & A. K. Johnston
- ——— (1938), Children of Other Lands, W. & A. K. Johnston
- ——— (1938), A Visit to the Zoo, W. & A. K. Johnston
- ——— (1938), Tales of Old Thatch, W. & A. K. Johnston
- ——— (1939), Children of Other Days, W. & A. K. Johnston
- ——— (1939), King Arthur and His Knights, W. & A. K. Johnston
- ——— (1939), All About the Circus, W. & A. K. Johnston (Mr. Galliano's Circus)
- ——— (1939), Friends of the Countryside, W. & A. K. Johnston
- ——— (1948), Nature Tales, W. & A. K. Johnston
- ——— (1948), Jolly Tales, W. & A. K. Johnston
- ——— (1952), Old Testament Stories, W. & A. K. Johnston
- ——— (1952), New Testament Stories, W. & A. K. Johnston
- ——— (1955), Hiawatha, Johnston & Bacon
- ——— (1955), Robin Hood, Johnston & Bacon
- ——— (1960), Aesop's Fables, Johnston & Bacon
- ——— (1960), Gulliver's Adventures, Johnston & Bacon
