= The Young Adventurers =

Book series by Enid Blyton

The Young Adventurers is a collection of books written by Enid Blyton, also known as The Riddle Series.

== The series ==
The books included in the series were originally written as stand-alone books or short stories, but they were revised and heavily updated by Enid Blyton's daughter, Gillian Baverstock, so that they featured consistent characters throughout and could be published as a series. The series was first published posthumously as the Riddle Series in 1997 by Collins. It was republished as The Young Adventurers Series in 2004 by Award. The Young Adventurers are illustrated by Patricia Ludlow.

The Young Adventurers:

1. The Young Adventurers at Holiday House
2. The Young Adventurers and the Mystery That Never Was
3. The Young Adventurers and the Rajah's Ruby
4. The Young Adventurers and the Hollow Tree
5. The Young Adventurers and the Hidden Treasure
6. The Young Adventurers and the Boy Next Door

The Riddle Series:

1. The Riddle of Holiday House ISBN 1-84135737-5
2. The Riddle That Never Was ISBN 0-00-694574-0
3. The Riddle of The Rajah's Ruby ISBN 0-00-694575-9
4. The Riddle of The Hollow Tree ISBN 0-00-694576-7
5. The Riddle of The Hidden Treasure ISBN 0-00-694577-5
6. The Riddle of The Boy Next Door ISBN 0-00-694578-3

== Original works ==
The original books were:

1. Holiday House (1955): Characters include twins Pat (Patrick) and Mary. Characters at the holiday house include Mrs. Holly, Ruth, Maureen, Tessa, Graham, and John.
2. The Mystery that Never Was (1961): Characters include Nicky Fraser, Nicky's dog Punch, Nicky's maternal uncle Bob, Nicky's best friend Ken, Ken's sister Penny, and Penny's friend Winnie.
3. Adventure of the Strange Ruby (1960): Characters include Pat and his sister Tessa, twins Faith and David Gathergood, and Faith and David's governess Miss Lawley.
4. Hollow Tree House (1945): Characters include siblings Peter and Susan, their aunt Margaret, their uncle Charlie, their friend Angela, and Angela's dog Barker. *Hollow Tree House was also republished in 1992 by Dean, as book 100 in the Dean's Reward Series.
5. The Treasure Hunters (1940): Characters include siblings Jeffrey, Susan, and John, their mother, their grandparents (the Greylings), and their dog, Rags, as well as Mr. Potts and Farmer Tibbles.
6. The Boy Next Door (1944): Characters include siblings Robin and Betty, their friend Lucy, Lucy's dog Sandy, their neighbour Kit Anthony Armstrong, and his guardian, known as "the Dragon".

== Plot overview ==
In this series, siblings Nick and Katie, along with various friends solve different mysteries. In the book The Riddle of The Hollow Tree, it is told that Nick and Katie's parents have died, and they are living with their aunt and uncle. At the end of the events in Hollow Tree, Nick and Katie have been adopted by their friend Laura's family, and Laura joins them in the remaining books in the series.

1. The Holiday House: Nick (Pat) and Katie (Mary) are sent to stay at Holiday House as they recover from illnesses. While at the house they see a light shining from an abandoned house and discover that there are secret passages from a cave and within Holiday House. They also solve the mystery of thefts occurring at the Holiday House.
2. The Mystery That Never Was: Nick and Katie's private investigator Uncle Bob comes for a rest and to recover from illness. He seems bored, so Nick and his friend Mike invent a mystery for him by writing a fake, coded note. They set the mystery on Skylark Hill, where there is a burned out house formerly owned by an Eastern prince. However, the mystery begins to come true, and it requires Nick and Katie, their friends Mike and Penny, Uncle Bob, and their dog Punch to solve it. They discover that there are foreign smugglers operating in the tower. In the original book, Uncle Bob is Nicky Fraser's uncle, Ken is Nicky's best friend, Penny is Ken's sister, and Winnie is Penny's best friend.
3. The Rajah's Ruby: Nick (Pat) and Katie (Tessa) read the newspaper and find out that their friends David and Sophie (Faith) have inherited a ruby. The ruby had been stolen from an Indian temple during a civil war and was believed to be bad luck. The ruby is then stolen and David and Sophie are kidnapped, but they manage to get a letter to Nick and Katie revealing where they are being taken. Nick and Katie manage to cycle from where they are spending their holiday to where David and Sophie are being held prisoner in Brinkin Towers. After their Aunt Dora breaks her leg, and Nick and Katie's mother returns to take care of her, Nick and Katie camp out on an island belonging to Brinkin towers. The twins manage to toss out the key locking them in, and Nick and Katie are able to release them. After their escape they hear the captors planning to move the captives to the island. One of the captors sneaks off and leaves the ruby on the island. He is accidentally scared off the island, and the remaining captors come to search for him. The children hide, but while the captors are on the island they sneak off and take their boat. They alert a policeman, who rounds up the captors and finds the ruby. The ruby is returned to a bank and the children spend the rest of their holidays together.
4. The Hollow Tree: Nick (Peter) and Katie (Susan) are sent to live with their cruel Aunt Margaret and her passive husband after the death of their parents. They make friends with neighbour Laura (Angela) and her dog Russet (Barker). While exploring the nearby woods, they discover a hollow tree, which they begin furnishing with their own items. After they get in trouble for the missing items, and their uncle walks out, they are to be sent to a children's home. Instead they run away to live in the hollow tree house. Angela helps them hide away from the search party that looks for them. One day, Angela comes looking for the tree house, but gets lost due to the guiding string being broken. She gets caught out in the storm, and is found by a rescue party, but becomes very ill from exposure, and keeps asking for her dog. Katie and Nick manage to return Russet to Laura, and end up being adopted by Laura's family.
5. The Hidden Treasure: Nick, Katie, and Laura (Jeffrey, Susan, and John), along with their dog Russet (Rags) go to visit Laura's grandparents at the Greyling Manor. Unfortunately this will be the last time they can visit, as the family estate must be sold to Mr. Potts. Their grandmother tells them that they are out of money, and tells the story of the Greyling's treasure, which had been given to Hugh Greyling by an Indian prince 250 years before, but had been lost. The children discover a cottage in the woods that is overgrown, and clear it out, but when they light a fire they discover that the chimney is blocked. It is found that there is a box containing a map to the treasure blocking the chimney. Mr. Potts manages to see and trace half of the map, and later searches their house secretly for the other half but is unable to find it. The children trick Mr. Potts with a fake half of the map while they decipher the real thing and find out where the treasure is hidden. They end up finding the treasure, running from Mr. Potts, hiding in a farm house, and ultimately returning with the treasure to their grandparents so that the manor need not be sold.
6. The Boy Next Door: Nick (Robin), Katie (Betty), and Laura (Lucy), along with Russet (Sandy) notice that a boy has moved in next door. However, when they ask about him they are told there is no boy living there. Still, they manage to communicate with the boy, and find out that his name is Kit Anthony Armstrong, he is an American boy, and he is in hiding from his uncle. They sneak out together on occasion and at one point find an abandoned houseboat named The Black Swan which they fix up. They get in trouble for cleaning it up, and must hide the existence of Kit. At one point, Kit hides away on the houseboat, but it ends up being where Kit's enemies were planning to hide him anyway. In the end Kit is rescued, and reunited with his father who has also been searching for him.

== Characters ==
=== Main characters ===
- Nick Terry: Katie's brother. Nick is known to be very responsible, excited and waiting for adventures. He is based on a number of characters from Blyton's original works, likely including Pat (Patrick), Nicky Fraser, Pat, Peter, John, and Robin.
- Katie Terry: Nick's sister, Katie is similar to Nick and also loves adventures. She is based on a number of characters from Blyton's original works, likely including Mary, Winnie, Tessa, Susan, Susan Greyling, and Betty.
- Punch: Nick and Katie's dog, seen in The Mystery that Never Was. Punch is watched by David and Sophie or Mike and Penny after Nick and Katie move away.
- Mike: Penny's brother who lives next door to the Terrys and appears in The Riddle that Never Was. He is Nick's best friend. Mike is likely based on Ken in the original book The Mystery that Never Was.
- Penny: Mike's sister who lives next door to the Terrys and appears in The Riddle that Never Was. She is Katie's best friend. Penny is likely based on the Penny in the original book The Mystery that Never Was.
- David: Sophie's twin, who appears in The Rajah's Ruby. He is named David Gathergood in the original book Adventure of the Strange Ruby. David and Sophie are previously known to Nick and Katie, as they met on vacation at Swanage. They were with a governess, because their parents died in a car accident. They inherit a ruby and are kidnapped in The Adventure of a Strange Ruby.
- Sophie: David's twin, who appears in The Rajah's Ruby. Sophie is named Faith Gathergood in the original book Adventure of the Strange Ruby. David and Sophie are previously known to Nick and Katie, as they met on vacation at Swanage. They were with a governess, because their parents died in a car accident. They inherit a ruby and are kidnapped in The Adventure of a Strange Ruby.
- Laura: Nick and Katie's friend, who they meet in The Hollow Tree. She later becomes Nick and Katie's adoptive sister. She was based on multiple characters from Blyton's original works, likely including Angela, Jeffrey, and Lucy.
- Russet: Laura's dog. He was based on multiple dogs from Blyton's original works, likely including Barker, Rags, and Sandy.

=== Minor characters ===
- Katie and Nick's parents: This series primarily focuses on the actions of the children, Katie and Nick, but their parents are revealed to have died at the beginning of The Hollow Tree House.
- Gareth: A guest at The Holiday House. He was very gloomy because of his brother Peter who was wrongly accused of stealing the precious jewellery of the boarding school he studied in. He is likely based on Graham from the original book Holiday House.
- Peter: Gareth's brother, who was accused of stealing jewellery in The Holiday House.
- Wilfred: A character in the original book Holiday House who framed Gareth (Graham)'s brother Peter for theft at school. Wilfred's sister is a chambermaid at Holiday House, and she has been thieving at the Holiday House.
- Clare: A talkative character who is a guest at The Holiday House.
- Mrs. Holly: The woman who runs the holiday house in the original book Holiday House. Her daughter is named Ruth.
- Ruth: Mrs. Holly's daughter in the original book Holiday House. She was unpleasant to the guests at holiday house, because she was jealous of her mother's care for other children, but improves after her mother talks to her.
- Maureen: a guest in the original book Holiday House. She has a nurse.
- Tessa: a baby in the original book Holiday House.
- John: a guest in the original book Holiday House. He is a nuisance.
- Uncle Bob: Nick and Katie's maternal uncle in The Mystery that Never Was. Nicky Fraser's uncle in the original book. He is a private investigator.
- Jim: One of the villains in the original book The Mystery that Never Was.
- Harry: One of the villains in the original book The Mystery that Never Was.
- Major Ellis Gathergood: Owner of the ruby in the original book Adventure of the Strange Ruby, until his death, at which point he passed it on to Mrs. Eleanor Gathergood.
- Mrs. Eleanor Gathergood: Owner of the ruby in the original book Adventure of the Strange Ruby, until her death, at which point she passed it on to Faith (Sophie) and David Gathergood. She is Faith and David's great aunt.
- Miss Lawley: David and Faith (Sophie)'s governess in the original book Adventure of the Strange Ruby.
- Auntie Dora: Pat (Nick) and Tessa (Katie)'s Aunt who breaks her leg in Adventure of the Strange Ruby.
- Rinji: One of the captors in Adventures of the Strange Ruby.
- Aunt Margaret: Nick and Katie's strict aunt, and Uncle Charlie's wife, who they live with starting in The Hollow Tree House.
- Uncle Charlie: Nick and Katie's weak-willed uncle, and Aunt Margaret's husband, who they live with starting in The Hollow Tree House.
- Laura's parents: Offer to adopt Nick and Katie at the end of The Hollow Tree House.
- The Greylings: Laura's grandparents, who Nick, Katie, and Laura go to visit in The Hidden Treasure.
- Mr. Potts: a man who attempts to purchase the Greyling estate and find the hidden treasure on it in The Hidden Treasure.
- Farmer Tibbles: a farmer who protects the children in The Hidden Treasure.
- Kit Anthony Armstrong: Nick, Katie, and Laura's hidden neighbour in The Boy Next Door.
- The Dragon: Kit's fierce but caring guardian in The Boy Next Door.
