= Ernest Aris =

English painter

- Other names: Robin A Hood and Dan Crow
- Occupations: author and illustrator

Alfred Ernest Walter George Aris, FZS, SGA, also known by the pen names Robin A Hood and Dan Crow, (1882–1963), was a writer and illustrator of children's books. He worked on more than 170 publications. Ernest Aris also designed cigarette cards, postcards, toys and games.

== Early life ==
Aris was born in Islington, London on 22 April 1882. He moved to Bradford, where he attended the Technical College and School of Art, and earned his diploma in 1900, under the tutorship of Charles Stephenson. Later at the Royal College of Art in London, he studied under Moira & Chambers. According to Who's Who (UK), Aris was an Art Master at the International Correspondence School, whilst Who Was Who in Art and The World Biographical Index of Artists refer to this as the Indian Civil Service School (ICSS).

== Career ==
As a commercial artist, his work was selected by Frank Pick to be archived at the Victoria and Albert Museum. He also designed cigarette cards, postcards, toys and games.

He specialised as a portrait artist working in charcoal and wash as well as watercolour. His work was exhibited at the Royal Academy, Royal Society of British Artists, Royal Society of Painters in Water Colours and the Royal Institute of Painters in Water Colours. He entered drawings for the Christmas supplement of a national weekly illustrated newspaper The Graphic. His first book appeared in 1909 and he was to go on to become an author/ illustrator of children's stories; his illustrations were used in a series of books published in 1989. He also produced cigarette cards, postcards, cartoons, games, jigsaw puzzles and advertisements.

He wrote and illustrated children's books. According to the dust jacket notes for a book published in 1947, he was the "Author and illustrator of some 170 different titles". An article in The Artist (1938) describes him as "an illustrator of over 400 children’s books, a master of the art of pleasing the child mind". There can be no doubt that he was indeed a prolific illustrator, whose work generated a whole new genre in children's illustration and would go on to create a multitude of imitators.

=== Literary Associations ===
Beatrix Potter wrote to Aris, using her married name of Mrs. Heelis, to ask what he would charge for illustrating a booklet in the style of Jemima Puddle-Duck (by Beatrix Potter) and was most put out when, "He had the effrontery to inform the offended author that he had never seen that classic!" Ernest, who had worked in Windermere, was seemingly aware of the literary identity of Mrs. Heelis and chose to respond in this way as he had already imitated Jemima in his book Mrs. Beak Duck. He sensed an opportunity and sent her publisher, Harold Warne, some examples of his work and offered his services. Harold was keen to publish more tales by the reluctant Beatrix and forwarded the books, and Ernest's letter, to her. Rather than be annoyed, she saw this as both a compliment and, as her eyesight was failing and because her hands were getting stiff, an opportunity. She wrote that she had "wished for a long time that you would find some second string – this man to my thinking is just what we want."

Beatrix wrote direct to Ernest commissioning and ultimately purchasing six drawings for a story, which she had in mind as a gift for her niece Nancy. She provided Ernest with some rough sketches and instructions as to composition and colouring, which, together with Ernest's originals are now in the ownership of the Victoria and Albert Museum. In engaging him, she is careful not to let him know that she is Beatrix Potter. Within the month, Ernest has finished the commission, and he forwards the drawings, advising Mrs. Heelis that, "I have not adopted your colour schemes as there was a tendency to be on the sombre side". He also altered the composition. Although she advised, "Russet brown and blue grey check (rather than greens) would show well on the elves clothing" Ernest, in his inimitable way, chose red. Beatrix later used aspects of design and colour presented to her by Ernest. She swapped his meadow bedecked with yellow flowers to open fell, but she retained his two Oakmen carrying a bundle suspended from a pole, which had not been a feature of her draft sketch. He advised her that in one of her sketches, "The figures are a little too near the front of the picture" and she used that comment to open out the design. At the same time that Ernest was being considered as a 'second string' to Beatrix, an American publisher used Ernest's pictures to illustrate a plagiarised version of Beatrix's The Story of a Fierce Bad Rabbit. Beatrix's publishers were then up in arms when Ernest's book The Treasure Seekers featured a rabbit called Peter. Whilst she advised Harold to sue the publishers she suggested that they buy Aris out. Beatrix defended Ernest but advised Warne to remonstrate with the publishers.

Warne's did exactly that, and Ernest apologised direct to Beatrix, thus acknowledging his awareness of her literary identity. Beatrix told her publishers that Aris was both "artlessly conceited" and a "little bounder" which put paid to plans for a partnership. He changed publishers and adopted pseudonyms; his work as Robin A Hood is well known, but few are aware that he issued six books as Dan Crow.

=== Designer of The Cococubs ===
In 1934, he designed a range of animal characters manufactured by the toy firm of Britain's and distributed free with a new line of Cadbury's Cocoa advertised as ‘The Children’s Cocoa’. Each of the animals had their own personalities, and the press release advised that they "were exclusively designed by an expert in child psychology". It was a huge success, with some 300,000 children collecting these toy figures, known collectively as the Cococubs, which were hailed as "one of the cleverest publicity schemes of the year" in advertising.

== Personal ==
Aris was hard of hearing, and by the age of 60, he was profoundly deaf. He returned to employment with the International Correspondence School distance-learning. He enjoyed the opera. His other interests included: fishing, travel, entomology, and swimming. He was an inveterate collector, hoarding matchbox labels and stamps as well as cigarette cards; he also enjoyed gardening, and collecting old furniture.

He was obviously good company, as Beatrix Potter described him as both "amusing" and a "scamp", whilst his pal Charles Bayne (the Editor of Little Folks from 1908 to 1915) said that he had an, "endless store of humorous ideas".

Ernest died (age 80) at his home in Hornsey, North London, on 14 April 1963.
