= The Barney Mysteries =

Series of six children's books by Enid Blyton

- The Rockingdown Mystery; The Rilloby Fair Mystery; The Ring O'Bells Mystery; The Rubadub Mystery; The Rat-a-Tat Mystery; The Ragamuffin Mystery
- Author: Enid Blyton
- Country: United Kingdom
- Language: English
- Genre: Children's literature, mystery
- Published: 1949–1959
- No. of books: 6

The Barney Mysteries were a series of six children's books written by British author Enid Blyton. They are also sometimes known as the "R" mysteries, because each title involves a word beginning with "R".

== Books ==
- The Rockingdown Mystery (1949)
- The Rilloby Fair Mystery (1950)
- The Ring O' Bells Mystery (1951)
- The Rubadub Mystery (1952)
- The Rat-a-Tat Mystery (1956)
- The Ragamuffin Mystery (1959)

Each of the Mysteries begins with the letter "R" as one of the characters disingenuously points out towards the end of the series.

== Themes and characters ==
A theme running throughout the books is that of lost or deceased parents. Roger and Diana are brother and sister, the children of Mr. and Mrs. Lynton. Their irritating, mischievous younger cousin Snubby (whose real name is Peter) comes to stay with them during the school holidays, as he has no parents. Snubby owns a black spaniel, who has the name of Loony. The other characters state that Loony was a perfect name for the dog, as Loony is very energetic and can cause trouble. He will obey only Snubby, and so, Snubby is the only one who can control him. During their first adventure, they meet Barney (his actual name is Barnabas), who makes an appearance in each of the succeeding books. Barney is older than Roger (who is the oldest main character until he makes his entrance) and lives a nomadic lifestyle, working in fairs and circuses (such as Rilloby Fair, which gives the name to the second book in the series). He has a monkey named Miranda who plays an important role in the mysteries. Miranda is said to be spoiled, but is quite lovable- or at least tolerable- to everyone, with the exception of Loony.

Barney is on a quest to find his missing father; his mother is dead and informed him about his father before her death. At the end of the fourth book, The Rubadub Mystery, Barney is reunited with his father, although he is still allowed to meet the others, and enjoys the final two mysteries. Barney is fifteen, Roger is fourteen, Diana is thirteen, and Snubby is eleven. In the earlier editions, Roger and Diana's pet cat is named Snoek (due to the amount of tinned snoek the family bought for it). In later editions, the cat is named Sardine (for the same reason). Snoek was shipped in tins to the UK during WW2 but it was not popular and was mainly fed to pet cats. After the war, the fish was not imported and younger readers wouldn't know what it was, and so the pet cat was renamed.

== Additional German volumes ==
In German, the Barney mysteries are known as the "Rätsel um...-Serie", or "Riddle of... series". In addition to translations of the six English titles, there are two additional volumes:

- Rätsel um den tiefen Keller ("Riddle of the Deep Cellar"). This is a translation of the one-off book, The Mystery That Never Was
- Rätsel um die Falschmünzer ("Riddle of the Counterfeiters"). This "translation" was in fact an original work by the series' German translator Brigitte Blobel, published by C. Bertelsmann Verlag in 1977. It had not been authorised by Darrell Waters Limited, and so was soon taken out of print.
