= Mary Gernat =

British illustrator

- Born: 16 August 1926; Ewell
- Died: 1998 (aged 71–72); Lymington
- Alma mater: Central School of Art and Design; University of Westminster
- Occupation: Illustrator

Mary Gernat was a British illustrator, known for her designs for the covers of paperback books by Enid Blyton, Frank Richards and others.

== Biography ==
Gernat was born in Ewell, Surrey, 16 Aug 1926, and underwent training at the Central School of Arts and Crafts and Regent Street Polytechnic.

Much of her work was for Armada Books. She also produced dust jacket designs for some hardback editions, and covers for magazines such as The Tatler.

She married Michael How, an engineer, in 1953. She had four sons, whom she used as models for her designs, and much later a daughter. From 1963 the family lived in Milford on Sea, and in 1970 they moved to Lymington. In later life she developed multiple sclerosis and after ceasing to paint professionally, continued to do so for pleasure. She died on the 12 Oct 1998.

In May 2019, 120 of her paintings and sketches were shown on the BBC Television programme Antiques Roadshow by one of her sons, in whose possession they remain.

== Book cover designs ==
Among the books whose covers were designed by Gernat were:

- A number by Enid Blyton
- Books by Frank Richards in the Billy Bunter series
- Books by Richmal Crompton 'Jimmy' series
- David Whitaker Doctor Who and the Crusaders - and early Doctor Who spin-off book
- Malcolm Saville: The Sign of the Alpine Rose (1963)
- Books by Monica Edwards
- Sheila K. McCullagh's Griffin Pirate Stories (also known as The Griffin Readers in original editions) that were published by EJ Arnold & Sons Limited for reading in primary/infant schools from the 1950s through to the late 1980s.
