= Armada Books =

Armada Books was a British publishing imprint that used to publish paperback titles from 1962 until 1995. Created by Gordon Landsborough as the paperback imprint of May Fair Books Ltd, Armada Books focused exclusively on books for children to buy with their pocket money. Armada was sold in 1966 and eventually ended up in the hands of Collins, who used it to publish books for 10- to 15-year-olds under their Fontana Books paperback arm until 1992.
