= Sunny Stories =

British children's magazine

Sunny Stories was a children's magazine published by George Newnes Ltd in the United Kingdom in the first half of the 20th century. It began as Sunny Stories for Little Folk in 1926 and was edited and written by Enid Blyton although she was only credited as the editor. Owing to Blyton's increasing popularity during the 1930s the magazine was renamed Enid Blyton's Sunny Stories in January 1937 and began serving as a vehicle for Blyton's books, which appeared as serials. Copies were sold for 2d (two pence).

Sunny Stories for Little Folk ran for 250 issues between July 1926 and November 1936. The magazine was started as a weekly, but its frequency was switched to fortnightly from issue 272.

With the renaming in 1937 to Enid Blyton's Sunny Stories, the magazine began featuring serials of her novels starting with The Adventures of the Wishing Chair, which was published properly at the end of the year. Blyton ceased contributing in 1953 with issue 553, going on to create Enid Blyton's Magazine.

Another prolific children's author, Malcolm Saville, became editor in 1954 under the shorter title Sunny Stories.
