= The Secret Seven =

Series of children's novels by Enid Blyton

- The first edition of the first book, titled The Secret Seven, illustrated by George Brook and published by Brockhampton Press
- The Secret Seven; Secret Seven Adventure; Well Done Secret Seven; Secret Seven on the Trail; Go Ahead Secret Seven; Good Work Secret Seven; Secret Seven Win Through; Three Cheers Secret Seven; Secret Seven Mystery; Puzzle for the Secret Seven; Secret Seven Fireworks; Good Old Secret Seven; Shock for the Secret Seven; Look Out Secret Seven; Fun for the Secret Seven; "Mystery of the Skull"; "Mystery of the Theatre Ghost"
- Author: Enid Blyton; Pamela Butchart
- Language: English
- Genre: Children's literature, mystery
- Publisher: Brockhampton Press
- Published in English: 1949–1963; 2018 - present
- No. of books: 17 (adding Pamela Butchart’s new works)

The Secret Seven or Secret Seven Society is a fictional group of child detectives created by Enid Blyton and based on the publisher's children. They appear in one of several adolescent detective series which Blyton wrote.

The Secret Seven consists of Peter (the society's head), Janet (Peter's sister), Pam, Barbara, Jack, Colin and George. Jack's sister Susie and her best friend Binkie make occasional appearances in the books; they hate the Secret Seven and delight in playing tricks designed to humiliate them, although this is partly fuelled by their almost obsessive desire to belong to the society.

Unlike most other Blyton non-school series, this one takes place during the school term time because the characters go to day schools.

Continuing Blyton's series, Pamela Butchart wrote two new adventures in the series, adding elements of horror.

== Origins ==
Blyton's elder daughter, Gillian Baverstock, describes a conversation between the author and her publisher that led to the inception of Blyton's Secret Seven. The publisher's own children, the eldest of whom was named Peter, had formed a secret society with their friends. They met in an old shed, used secret passwords and had badges inscribed with "SS".

After corresponding with the real-life Peter, in 1948 Blyton published her first Secret Seven story, which describes how her fictional society came to be formed. This was a short story titled "The Secret of the Old Mill". It followed an earlier short story, "At Seaside Cottage", which introduced the leading characters, Peter and Janet, prior to the formation of the society. There followed a further five short stories and fifteen full-length books.

== Shorts ==
The Secret Seven appeared in seven short stories by Blyton, including a mini-novella explaining how the society was formed. These were left uncollected until 1997, when all but "At Seaside Cottage" were published in a single volume by Hodder Children's Books under the title of Secret Seven: Short Story Collection.

1. At Seaside Cottage (1947) – first published as a complete short story book
2. Secret of the Old Mill (1948) – first published in "Secret of the Old Mill"
3. The Humbug Adventure (1954) – first published in Enid Blyton's Magazine Annual No.1
4. Adventure on the Way Home (1955) – first published in Enid Blyton's Magazine Annual No.2
5. An Afternoon with the Secret Seven (1956) – first published in Enid Blyton's Magazine Annual No.3
6. Where Are the Secret Seven? (1956) – first published in the strip book of the same name
7. Hurry, Secret Seven, Hurry! (1957) – first published in Enid Blyton's Magazine Annual No.4

== Full-length books ==
1. The Secret Seven (1949) – In the Secret Seven's first full-length adventure together, Jack witnesses suspicious activity on a snowy night after searching for his badge near a large house where only a deaf, cantankerous caretaker resides. Suspecting a person is being held prisoner, the Seven then investigate the mystery.
2. Secret Seven Adventure (1950) – While the Seven are playing Red Indians in a wood, Peter and Colin encounter a man who has just stolen Lady Lucy Thomas's pearl necklace from Milton Manor. The search for the thief leads the children to a circus field and lions.
3. Well Done, Secret Seven (1951) – The Secret Seven build a tree house to escape the summer heat. There, they meet a dirty boy and his injured kitten. The boy gives them some clues to a mystery involving a planned mail heist.
4. Secret Seven on the Trail (1952) – A trick by Susie and her infuriating Famous Five group sends Jack and George on a night trek to Tigger's Barn. But the prank leads the Secret Seven to a group of train robbers.
5. Go Ahead Secret Seven (1953) – A little following practice by George goes awry and his parents force him to resign from the Secret Seven. Scamper is installed as his temporary replacement. Some shadowing by Colin puts the Seven on the trail of a man who shoves dogs down a coal hole. The group must then solve the mystery of the stolen dogs. By the end of the book, George is reinstalled as a member.
6. Good Work Secret Seven (1954) – As Bonfire Night approaches, Susie and her friends play a prank on the Seven, leading them on a wild goose-chase to a shed. Later, Peter and Janet's father's car is stolen — with them inside — but the car is soon abandoned. The group's plans for Bonfire Night seem scuppered when Scamper unwittingly sets alight their collection of fireworks. The Seven investigate the car thieves, with Peter disguising himself as a guy to keep watch for suspects at a cafe.
7. Secret Seven Win Through (1955) – The Seven are evicted from their shed while it is painted, and find a new meeting place — a cave on Peter and Janet's father's property. They stock the cave with cushions, food, drinks and books, including Colin's set of Famous Five novels. When their provisions start to go missing, the children suspect Susie; but Scamper later uncovers a notebook leading to crooks and a search for scarecrows.
8. Three Cheers Secret Seven (1956) – Susie's model aeroplane launches the Secret Seven into their next adventure. Who is using the top room in the empty Barlett Lodge, and why?
9. Secret Seven Mystery (1957) – When a schoolgirl is reported missing the Seven begin their search, with Susie hindering them at every turn. Where is Elizabeth Sonning, and who stole the money from her school?
10. Puzzle for the Secret Seven (1958) – The Seven witness a house fire, and help the family in need to rebuild their lives — but who stole a valuable violin, and what is making the baffling wailing noises on the hills at night?
11. Secret Seven Fireworks (1959) – The Secret Seven are shocked when Jack's sister forms a rival club called the Tiresome Three. But surely Susie wouldn't really steal their guy's clothes and firework money? And who are the nasty looking men lurking in the hut on Peter's farm?
12. Good Old Secret Seven (1960) – Jack's new telescope promised hours of fun until Susie claimed her half share. But after Janet spots a strange face at the window of Torling Castle, The Seven must investigate.
13. Shock for the Secret Seven (1961) – An argument between Peter and Jack leads to Jack resigning from the group, which is forced to become the Secret Six. But when dogs start going missing all over town, and Scamper also disappears, the group must solve the mystery. In the end, though, it is Jack who finds the vital clue and saves the day, and the Secret Seven is back together once more.
14. Look Out Secret Seven (1962) – Medals belonging to a kindly old General have gone missing, and Colin promises to find them — but what can they do when there are no clues and the police are baffled?
15. Fun for the Secret Seven (1963) – There is no actual mystery in the Secret Seven's final outing. A boy named Bob Smith asks the Seven to help an elderly farm worker, Tolly, pay a vet's bill for a lame horse that is at risk of being put to sleep. The children save the horse and toward the end of the book, thwart some horse thieves. During the story, Janet reads a Famous Five novel.

== Characters ==
- Peter – The society's leader. Although smart and strong, he is easily slighted and angered. A strong and capable leader, he has a bossy streak, verging on being downright unreasonable (particularly about wearing badges and remembering the password), reducing Pam and Barbara to tears, and on one occasion, causing Jack to temporarily leave the group. He, Janet and Jack are often closer with each other than other members of the group. Peter sometimes teases his sister, but acknowledges her as a good member of the society.
- Janet – Peter's sister. Janet is very caring and she does her work seriously. She is more headstrong and braver than the other girls in the group. Her arch-enemy is Susie. Janet is very good friends with Pam and also gets along well with Jack. She thinks of many good ideas. She is quite messy, and takes too long to write if trying to write neatly.
- Jack – Peter's best friend. He is frequently annoyed by his younger sister, Susie, who takes advantage of his tendency to forget the password. He gets along well with everyone in the group, especially Peter, but is also the only member who will willingly stand up to Peter when he feels that he is behaving unreasonably, to the extent that he once walked out on the group after an argument with him (although they reconciled at the end). Jack lives very near to Peter and Janet. He thinks Janet is a lot better than the other girls and wishes Susie was like Janet.
- Pam – A girl at Janet's school. Her best friend is Barbara and she laughs a lot. Her full first name is Pamela. She sometimes proves herself a worthy member of the Secret Seven by getting brainwaves, but is sometimes careless, such as yelling out the password and squealing when Peter was nearly pushed out of their "secret" treehouse.
- Barbara – Another girl at Janet's school. She and Pam generally work (and giggle) together when looking for clues or information. They are out a lot together, such as not being able to turn up to a meeting because they are going to the same party. Barbara was the only member to be chosen by Peter: the other four were all selected by Janet.
- Colin – A boy at Peter's school. Colin is a valuable member of the society, though perhaps the quietest of the boys. He has a large family, most of whom live with him. He finds his family tiresome and is afraid of the dark. He made the mystery in "Secret Seven Adventure" warm up when he saw a man escaping from Lady Thomas's house.
- George – A boy at Peter's school. His best friend is Colin. George's father once banned him from the society, but he later realized his mistake and let George rejoin. Not much else is known about him, as he is rather undeveloped as a character.

Scamper – Janet and Peter's pet dog and beloved companion. He is not an official member of the Secret Seven, but the children count him as one, due to his regular usefulness in the denouement of the stories. He has temporarily filled in for members when they have left the group for any reason. He is a friendly golden English Cocker Spaniel. He loves food, especially biscuits.

=== Supporting characters ===
- Susie – Jack's younger sister who frequently aggravates him and the Society which she enjoys humiliating and tormenting with her quick wit. However, this stems from her burning desire to join the Society, which Peter regularly refuses her. This is actually something of a disadvantage for Peter, as Susie is considerably more clever and cunning than some of the other members, especially Barbara and Pam, and would potentially be a more valuable member. The Seven occasionally make a temporary truce with Susie, and sometimes she helps them solve the mysteries.
- Binkie – Susie's best friend who was even worse to Jack than his sister.
- Bony - Susie's and Jack's French friend who appears in one book. His real name is Jean Baptiste Boneparte. He is very timid, shy and loves dogs. Dogs love him too and are often attracted to him. He is more friendly towards Susie than to Jack and is often annoyed with the Secret Seven. He had been a member of Susie's club for a few days before he returned to France and soon after that the club broke up.
- Jack the farmer – Jack the farmer is Peter and Janet's father. He is not as strict as some parents of the day, but has taught Peter and Janet some very strong ideas about right and wrong.
- Peter and Janet's mother – Peter and Janet's mother is supportive of the Secret Seven and their good work. She frequently provides snacks for their meetings.
- Jack's mother – Unlike Peter's mother, Jack's mother does not think the Secret Seven is particularly important and gets angry when Jack puts all his effort into fulfilling Peter's wishes although she does sometimes provide for the Secret Seven.
- Matt the Shepherd – Peter's father's elderly colleague, who works on the farm. He has a dog called Shadow who is stolen in a mystery but is later recovered. He is portrayed as a helpful and caring old man.
- Shadow - Matt the shepherd's strong, heavy shepherd dog who loves his master very much. Matt too loves him like a brother. He is stolen in a mystery in the book Shock for Secret Seven but is later recovered.
- The Inspector – The police inspector who the Secret Seven always report the cases to. He has become a good friend of the Secret Seven.
- Postie the Postman – Postie was the postman of the area and almost all dogs were attracted towards him. He was found to be criminal in the book Shock for Secret Seven and was jailed.
- The Gardener – Peter and Janet's gardener, who has a very bad temper but can be witty and even useful when he helps capture some criminals along with Matt the Shepherd and Peter's dad in Good Old Secret Seven.

== French series ==
In the late 1970s and early 1980s, Evelyne Lallemand wrote an additional series of 11 books about the Secret Seven, nine of which were translated into English by Anthea Bell and published in paperback by Knight Books. The English translations were published between 1983 and 1986. The full French series is as follows:

1. Les Sept à la chasse au lion 1976 (English title: The Seven and the Lion Hunt; English no.: 1)
2. Les Sept font du cinéma 1977 (English title: The Seven on Screen; English no.: 6)
3. Les Sept et le magicien 1977 (English title: The Seven and the Magician; English no.: 3)
4. Les Sept sont dans de beaux draps 1978 (English title: The Seven Go Haunting; English no.: 2)
5. Les Sept et les bulldozers 1978 (English title: The Seven to the Rescue; English no.: 5)
6. Les Sept et la déesse d'or 1979 (English title: The Seven Strike Gold; English no.: 4)
7. Les Sept et les soucoupes volantes 1979 (English title: The Seven and the UFOs; English no.: 7)
8. Les Sept à 200 à l'heure 1980 (English title: The Seven and the Racing Driver; English no.: 9)
9. Les Sept ne croient pas au père Noël 1981 (English title: The Seven and Father Christmas; English no.: 8)
10. Les Sept saluent Lucky Star 1982 (The Seven greet Lucky Star)
11. Les Sept et la boule de cristal 1984 (The Seven and the Crystal Ball)

== Pamela Butchart books ==
In 2018, Hodder Children's Books published The Secret Seven Mystery of the Skull by Pamela Butchart in an effort to augment sales of the series. This was followed in 2019 by The Secret Seven and the Mystery of the Theatre Ghost.

== Stage adaptations ==
The first ever stage adaptation based on The Secret Seven opened in Chester at the city's new Storyhouse theatre from 1 December 2017. It received good reviews.

== Audio drama ==
A dramatized audio drama adaptation of several Secret Seven books was published by Rainbow Communications in 1983.
