= Rene Cloke =

British illustrator and watercolorist

Rene Mable Neighbor Cloke (4 October 1904 – 1 October 1995) was a British illustrator and watercolorist best known for her prolific output of artwork for children's books and greeting cards. Her work often displayed a whimsical quality, with frequent subjects being flora and fauna, pixies, fairies, sprites, and elves.

== Life and career ==
Born in Plymouth, England in 1904, Cloke never trained formally as an artist and was largely self taught. She was the older sister of concert pianist Olive Cloke. Their father was a bank manager. She began her career as an illustrator in the 1920s with W. R. Chambers Publishers. Her first work of note for that publisher was as the artist for The Radiant Way children's book series. She continued to illustrate children's books for the next seven decades, working for most major publishers in the United Kingdom. Some of the books she illustrated include, Alice in Wonderland, Red Riding Hood Goes to the Teddy-Bear's Picnic, Joy Bells, Little Boy Blues Nursery Rhymes and Fairy Tales, Little Folk's First Book, Enid Blyton's Everyday Book series, My Best Book of Enid Blyton Stories and Woodland Tales among many others. She also illustrated several religious books for children. She worked for many years as an artist for Medici Cards, designing more than 100 greeting cards for that company. Her work was also featured in the magazine Playhour.

During World War II, Cloke worked as a tracer, producing maps of enemy camps and installations from photographs made by the Royal Air Force for the War Office. After the war, she settled in Wimbledon Village where she resided with her sister. A shy person, she avoided being the center of attention or engaging with the public, preferring to remain anonymous and unacknowledged in her work. She never married and died in Wimbledon on 1 October 1995.

In 2013–2014 Cloke's work was included in the exhibition "Grimm Girls: Picturing the Princess" at The Otter Gallery at the University of Chichester.

== Partial list of publications with Cloke's artwork ==
=== Books ===
- Mr Podge of Oaktree Lodge. Bognor Regis & London, John Crowther, 1943.
- Chickweed. Leicester, Edmund Ward, 1947.
- Joy Bells Picture and Story Book. London, Juvenile Productions, 1949.
- Before We Go To Bed. London, Juvenile Productions, 1953.
- The Little Roundabout Horse. London & Glasgow, Blackie & Son, 1954.
- Tippety is Snowed Up. London & Glasgow, Blackie & Son, 1954.
- Barnaby's Cuckoo Clock. Exeter, Wheaton, 1958.
- Merry's New Hat. Exeter, Wheaton, 1958.
- Paul Piglet Keeps Shop. London & Glasgow, Blackie, 1960.
- Popkyn the Pedlar. London & Glasgow, Blackie, 1960.
- Snowy For Sale. London & Glasgow, Blackie, 1961.
- Adventure in Acorn Wood. London & Glasgow, Blackie, 1962.
- Little Darling Book series. London, Sandle Bros., 4 vols., 1964.
- Dragonfly Story Books series:
  - The Big Race. Exeter, Wheaton, 1966.
  - Filbert Builds a Boat. Exeter, Wheaton, 1966.
  - The Letter. Exeter, Wheaton, 1966.
  - Roddy in the Rain. Exeter, Wheaton, 1966.
  - The Sleepy Visitors. Exeter, Wheaton, 1966.
  - The Twins Go to Market. Exeter, Wheaton, 1966.
  - The Walking Holiday. Exeter, Wheaton, 1966.
  - The Wishing Well. Exeter, Wheaton, 1966.
- A Posy of Little Verses, illus. Adolf Zabransky. London, Hamlyn, 1967.
- No Dogs Please!. Exeter, Haldon Books, Sep 1967.
- The Happy Seasons. Poems for the young, illus. by Adolf Zabransky. London, Hamlyn, 1968.
- Music in the Meadow, and other verses, illus. by Adolf Zabransky. London, Hamlyn, 1968.
- The Brave Tin Soldier by Hans Andersen, retold by Rene Cloke. London, Dean, 1969.
- Woodland Stories. London, Award Publications, 1975.
- I Can Read a Rainbow. London, Award Publications, 1976.
- ABC Counting Book. London, Award Publications, 1977?
- Rene Cloke's Bedtime Book of Fairytales and Rhymes. London, Award Publications, 1978.
- Brer Rabbit's Colour Book. London, Award Publications, 1988.
- Brer Rabbit's Puzzle Book. London, Award Publications, 1988.
- Tales of Hopping Wood series:
  - Tufty's Pot of Paint. London, Award, 1988.
  - Flipperty's Aeroplane. London, Award, 1988.
  - Larry's Caravan. London, Award, 1988.
- Tales of Oaktree Wood series:
  - Rusty's House. London, Award, 1989.
  - Mandy's Umbrella. London, Award, 1990.
  - Spindle's Picnic. London, Award, 1990.
  - Vicky's New Hat. London, Award, 1990.
- Woodland Tales, London, Award Publications, 2003.

=== Illustrated books ===
- The Children's Hour. Stories, jigsaws & painting, illus. with others. London, Daily *Express Publications, 1935.
- Bible Painting Books no. 1–4. Wallington, Religious Education Press, 1941.
- Bible Painting Books no. 5–8, ed. E. H. Hayes. Wallington, Religious Education Press, 1942.
- Bible Story Picture Books: Jesus Our Friend, ed. Bertha C. Krall. Wallington, Carwal Publications, 1943.
- Red Riding Hood Goes to the Teddy Bears' Picnic by Bey Royle. Bognor Regis & London, John Crowther, 1943.
- The Ugly Duckling by Hans Christian Andersen. Leicester, Edmund Ward, 1943.
- Alice in Wonderland by Lewis Carroll. London, P. R. Gawthorn, 1944.
- The Nightingale by Hans Andersen. Leicester, Edmund Ward, 1945.
- Amelia Jane Again! by Enid Blyton. London, Dean, 1946.
- The Balloon in the Tree; and, The Very Strange Pool by Enid Blyton. London, Sampson Low, 1946.
- Favourite Stories from Hans Andersen, with an introduction by Roger Lancelyn Green. Leicester, Edmund Ward, 1947.
- Grimms' Fairy Tales. London, P. R. Gawthorn, 1947.
- The Sleeping Beauty and other tales, retold by Roger Lacelyn Green, Leicester, Edmund Ward, 1947.
- Beauty and the Beast, and other tales, retold by Roger Lancelyn Green. Leicester, Edmund Ward, 1948.
- Little Boy Blue Nursery Rhymes and Fairy Tales. London, Juvenile Productions, 1949.
- Little Women by Louisa May Alcott. London, P. R. Gawthorn, 1949
- Favourite Hymn Painting Book, ed. Ernest H. Hayes. Wallington, Religious Education Press, 1950.
- Gospel Stories Painting Book. Wallington, Religious Education Press, 1950.
- Three Little Nursery Rhymes. London, Juvenile Productions, 1950.
- Through the Looking-Glass and what Alice found by Lewis Carroll. London, 1951.
- Punch and Judy Annual. London, Juvenile Productions, c.1951.
- Three Little Kittens. Nursery rhymes. London, Juvenile Productions, 1952.
- Pantomime Stories. London & Melbourne, Ward, Lock & Co., 1953.
- Birds of the River by Mary Kerr. Leicester, Edmund Ward, 1959.
- A Play at Pebblings Village by Modwena Sedgwick. London, Burke, 1960.
- My First Reading Book of Fairy Stories. London, Kingfisher Colour Books, 1960.
- My First Reading Book of Fairy Tales. London, Kingfisher Colour Books, 1960.
- Bible Stories from the Old Testament and the Life of Jesus. London, Ward Lock (All Colour Picture Book 8), 1961.
- The Lord Jesus. Wallington, Religious Education Press, 1961.
- Good News. Wallington, Religious Education Press, 1961.
- Jesus, Friend of All. Wallington, Religious Education Press, 1961.
- Stories From the Bible. Wallington, Religious Education Press, 1961.
- Pat-a-Cake Nursery Rhymes. Paulton, Purnell, 1961.
- Little Folks' Book of Nursery Rhymes. London, Frederick Warne & Co., 1962.
- Little Folk's Book of Nursery Tales. London, Frederick Warne & Co., 1963.
- Little Folk's First Book, ed. Kate Burchell. London, 1964.
- The Wild Swans. London & Melbourne, Ward Lock & Co. (Kingfisher Colour Book 14), 1965.
- Little Folk's Second Book, ed. Kate Burchell. London, 1966.
- Crossword Painting Books. Wallington, Religious Education Press, 1966– .
- Fairies and Giants. Three favourite stories for children. London, Collins, 1967.
- My Bumper Book of Colour Fairy Stories. London, Warwick Press, 1968.
- The Snow Queen by Hans Christian Andersen; retold by Rene Cloke. London, Dean, 1968.
- The Adventures of Mr Pink-Whistle by Enid Blyton. London, Dean, 1969.
- Fairyland Tales (includes Canterbury Bells by Rene Cloke). London, Collins, 1969.
- My Favourite Book of Fairy Stories. London, Ward Lock, 1969.
- Naughty Amelia Jane by Enid Blyton. London, Dean, 1969.
- Puss in Boots, retold by Rene Cloke. London, Dean, 1969.
- The Three Golliwogs by Enid Blyton. London, Dean & Son, 1969.
- Weather in Britain by L. G. Humphrys. Oxford, Basil Blackwell, 1969.
- Jack and the Beanstalk, retold by Antony Camden. London, Sandle Brothers (Tulip-Colour Books 1), 1969?
- Babes in the Wood. London, Sandle Brothers (Tulip-Colour Books 2), 1969?
- Red Riding Hood, retold by Antony Camden. London, Sandle Brothers/Ward Lock & Co., 1969
- Aladdin, and other stories, retold by Antony Camden. London, Sandle Brothers/Ward Lock & Co., 1969.
- Dick Whittington, retold by Antony Camden. London, Sandle Brothers/Ward Lock & Co. (Tulip-Colour Books 7), 1969.
- Jack and the Beanstalk, retold by Rene Cloke. London, Dean, 1970.
- Mister Meddle's Mischief by Enid Blyton. London, Dean, 1970.
- Mister Meddle's Muddles by Enid Blyton. London, Dean, 1970.
- Mr Pink-Whistle Interferes by Enid Blyton. London, Dean, 1970.
- My Picture Book of Rhymes. London, Dean, 1970.
- Sleeping Beauty. London, Dean, 1970.
- Nursery Rhymes. London, Dean, 1972.
- Enid Blyton's Everyday Book of Goodnight Stories by Enid Blyton. London, Dean, 1975.
- Enid Blyton's Everyday Book of Playtime Stories by Enid Blyton. London, Dean, 1975.
- Enid Blyton's Everyday Book of Sleepytime Stories by Enid Blyton. London, Dean, 1975.
- Enid Blyton's Everyday Book of Twilight Stories by Enid Blyton. London, Dean, 1975.
- Hans Andersen Stories. London, Award, 1975.
- My First Picture Book of Tales of Hans Christian Andersen. 1975; as Hans Andersen Fairy Tales, London, Award, 1996.
- Nursery Stories. London, Award, 1975.
- Toddler's Picture Book. London, Award, 1975.
- My First Picture Book of Fairy Tales. 1976; as Favourite Fairy Tales, London, Award, 1996.
- My First Picture Book of Nursery Rhymes. London, Award Publications, 1976.
- My First Picture Book of Telling the Time. London, Award Publications, 1976.
- Enid Blyton's Gift Book of Bedtime Stories (some illus. from Enid Blyton's Everyday Book series). London, Dean, 1978.
- Brer Rabbit Stories by Joel Chandler Harris. London, Award, 1982.
- More Brer Rabbit Stories by Joel Chandler Harris. London, Award, 1982.
- The Town Mouse and the Country Mouse. London, Award, 1982.
- My Big Book of Brer Rabbit Stories by Joel Chandler Harris. London, Award, 1983.
- Bible Stories for Children. London, Award, 1984.
- The Greedy Rabbit and other stories by Enid Blyton. London, Award Publications, 1985.
- Kenneth Grahame's The Wind in the Willows, adapted by Michael Bishop. London, Award, 1985; later reissued as a series of sticker books, The Wind in the Willows: The River Bank, The Wind in the Willows: The Wild Wood, London, Award, 1997.
- The Little Match Girl and other stories. London, Award, 1985; as Storyland Classics, London, Award, 1998.
- Storyland. Classic tales for children, retold by Howard Hall. London, Award, 1985.
- What No Cheese!; and, The Lambikin by Enid Blyton. London, Award, 1985?
- Classic Fairy Tales. Manchester, Cliveden Press, 1986.
- Brer Rabbit Again by Joel Chandler Harris, retold by Enid Blyton. London, Award, 1987.
- More Bible Stories, retold by Jane Carruth. London, Award, 1987; revised as More Bible Stories for Children, London, Award, 1995.
- Little Treasury of The Wind in the Willows by Kenneth Grahame, retold by Tina Rose. Worksop, Award, 1988.
- Pipes for Old Puff; and, The Little Down Cushion by Enid Blyton. London, Award, 1988.
- Cathy Dresses Up (Dressing Book). London, Award Publications, 1989.
- Lewis Carroll's Alice in Wonderland, adapted by Jane Carruth. London, Award Publications, 1990.
- Mr Twiddle Stories (contains Hello, Mr Twiddle! and Well, Really, Mr Twiddle!). London, Red Fox, 1990.
- Pinocchio. London, Award Publications, 1990.
- Cinderella. London, Award Publications, 1991.
- Little Red Riding Hood. London, Award Publications, 1991.
- Mr Toad Comes Home, from Kenneth Grahame's The Wind in the Willows, adapted by Jane Carruth. London, Award, 1993.
- The Conjuring Wizard; and, Snippitty's Shears by Enid Blyton. London, Award, 1994.
- The Lucky Green Pea by Enid Blyton. London, Award, 1994.
- The Pixies and the Primroses; and, Upadee and the Dragon by Enid Blyton. London, Award, 1994.
- The Rude Little Rabbit by Enid Blyton. London, Award, 1994.
- The Squirrel and the Pixie; and, Dame Thimble and Her Matches by Enid Blyton. London, Award, 1994.
- The Tale of Scissors the Gnome; and, How Derry the Dormouse Lost His Secret by Enid Blyton. London, Award, 1994.
- Three Bold Pixies and other stories by Enid Blyton. London, Award, 1994.
- The Adventures of Mr Toad from Kenneth Grahame's The Wind in the Willows, adapted by Jane Carruth. London, Award, 1995.
- Little Otter is Missing from Kenneth Grahame's The Wind in the Willows, adapted by Jane Carruth. London, Award, 1995.
- The Crown of Gold by Enid Blyton. London, Award, 1995.
- The Sailor Doll Goes to Sea; and, The Meddlesome Butterfly by Enid Blyton. London, Award Publications, 1996.
- Big-Eyes the Enchanter; and, The Squirrel and the Pixie. London, Award, 1998.
- Fairyland Classics, retold by Jane Carruth. London, Award, 1998.
