= Evans Brothers Ltd =

British publishing house

Evans Brothers
- Status: Defunct
- Founded: 1903
- Defunct: 22 May 2016
- Country of origin: United Kingdom
- Headquarters location: London
- Publication types: Books

Evans Brothers Ltd (or Evans Brothers Limited) was a British publishing house that was part of the Evans Publishing Group UK. The firm first published teacher training materials and in later years broadened its catalogue, publishing children's books and books on Africa. It became insolvent in September 2012 and ceased trading.

== History ==
In 1903, the brothers Robert and Edward Evans founded the firm Evans Brothers which initially focused on the publication of teacher training journals and periodicals. In the early years the firm was headquartered at the brothers' residence at 118, Newgate Street, London, England. Early Evans Brothers publications included some of the foremost teacher training materials of the time, such as The Education News of Scotland, Irish School Weekly, Woman Teachers World, The Word Master, The Music Teacher, Child Education and The School Mistress. In the first year of operations, the company grossed 150 pounds.

In the 1930s, Evans Brothers London moved into book publishing, with emphasis on children’s books. Notable titles from the Evans stable included The Dam Busters and The White Rabbit (in their "Evans War Classics Editions" series) and a number of titles from the prolific British children's writer Enid Blyton. The firm also published the book series "Cadet Editions", "Let's Find Out", "Literature in Perspective", "Evans Africa Plays" and "Modern African Writers".

In the decades after World War II the company set up a presence in Africa with associated companies in Nigeria, Kenya and Sierra Leone.

== Notable staff ==
- Margaret Biggs, writer of girls' school stories, worked at Evans, as did Jacqueline Blairman; they wrote Triplets at Royders (Sampson Low, 1950?) together.

== See also ==
- Evans Brothers (Nigeria Publishers) Limited
