= Bettington =

Bettington is a surname. Notable people with the name include:

- Claude Bettington (1875–1912), mining engineer and pioneer aviator from South Africa
- Digby Rowland Albemarle Bettington KPM, Commissioner of Police in the Gold Coast
- James Bettington (1796–1857), English-born Australian politician
- John Bettington (1898–1931), Australian cricketer
- Reg Bettington (1900–1969), Australian cricketer and medical specialist

== See also ==
- Beddington (disambiguation)
- Beddington (surname)
- Boddington (disambiguation)
- 56-60 Bettington Street, Millers Point, Sydney, Australia
- 66-68 Bettington Street, Millers Point, Sydney, Australia
