= Len Nettlefold =

Australian amateur golfer (1905–1971

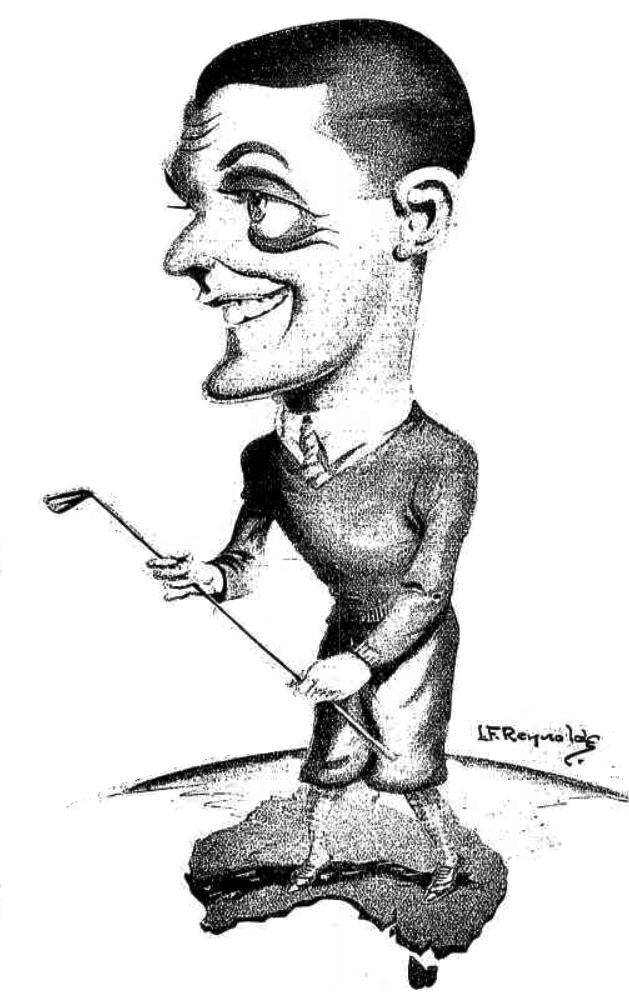
- 1926 caricature by Reynolds

Personal information
- Full name: Leonard Nettlefold
- Nationality: Australia
- Born: 16 October 1905 Bellerive, Tasmania, Australia
- Died: 4 October 1971 (aged 65) Honolulu, Hawaii

Career
- Sport: Golf
- Status: Amateur

Best results in major championships
- Masters Tournament: DNP
- PGA Championship: DNP
- U.S. Open: DNP
- The Open Championship: T52: 1927

Leonard Nettlefold CBE (16 October 1905 – 4 October 1971) was an Australian businessman and amateur golfer. He won the Australian Amateur twice, in 1926 and 1928, and won the Tasmanian Open and the Tasmanian Amateur, eight times each.

== Early life ==
Nettlefold was born in Bellerive, Tasmania on 16 October 1905, the son of Robert Nettlefold, golfer and assurance agent. He was educated at the Hutchins School in Hobart.

== Golf career ==
In 1922 he finished joint runner-up, with Eustace Headlam, in the Tasmanian Open behind his father. The leading four qualified for the Tasmanian Amateur, but both Nettlefolds lost their semi-final matches, Len losing to Headlam. Nettlefold spent most of 1923 on a world tour with his parents.

The Tasmanian Open was not played from 1923 to 1929 but there continued to be a 36-hole qualifying stage for the Tasmanian Amateur, with the leading 8 playing in the match play. After missing 1923, Nettlefold led the qualifying in 1924. In the match play he beat his father in the semi-final and then beat C. H. Richardson 11&10 in the final to win his first Tasmanian Amateur title, having been 10 up after the morning round. In 1925, Nettlefold played in his first championship meeting, in Sydney. He played well enough in the Australian Open to qualify for the Australian Amateur, losing in the quarter-finals 8&7 to Harry Sinclair. Later in the year he was tied for third place in qualifying for the Tasmanian Amateur. He again beat his father to reach the final but lost to Hugh Smith by two holes.

In July 1926 Nettlefold played in the South Australian Amateur at Royal Adelaide. He was one of the eight qualifiers and met his father in the first match-play round, winning 3&2. He went on to reach the final before losing to Legh Winser 3&1. He then travelled to Melbourne to play in the Victorian Amateur Championship, losing to Alex Russell in the semi-final. Nettlefold returned to Adelaide to play in the championship meeting. He finished tied for 11th place in the Australian Open, which was won by Ivo Whitton. In the Australian Amateur that followed, he met Whitton in the final, winning by two holes. Nettlefold only finished second in the qualifying for the Tasmanian Amateur, but won the championship, beating Terence Brown 5&4 in the final.

Nettlefold and his father travelled to Europe again in 1927, arriving in late April. He played in the Amateur Championship in late May, reaching the quarter-finals before losing 4&3 to William Tweddell, the eventual winner. He played in the 1927 Open Championship in July, on the Old Course at St Andrews. He qualified after rounds of 80 on the Old Course and 75 on the New Course. He took an early lead after a first round of 71, although he was pushed back into second place at the end of the day by Bobby Jones's 68. He then had further rounds of 81, 85 and 81 to finish tied for 52nd place. In early August he was the runner-up in the Swiss Amateur. Nettlefold returned too late to defend his Australian Amateur title but in time to play in the Tasmanian Amateur. He led the qualifying but lost in the first round of the match-play to Eustace Headlam.

The 1928 championship meeting was held at Royal Sydney. After the first day of the Australian Open Nettlefold was one stroke behind the three leaders. He faded a little on the last day but finished alone in fifth place, the leading amateur. The following week he won the Australian Amateur, beating Stan Keane in the final. He had a remarkable win in the semi-final against George Fawcett. Fawcett was 5 up with 7 holes to play, but Nettlefold won at the 38th hole. After returning to Tasmania, he tied with his father for first place in the qualifying for the Tasmanian Amateur but lost 8&7 in the final to Terence Brown.

In 1929 he reached the quarter-finals of the Australian Amateur, losing 3&2 to Mick Ryan. He won the Tasmanian Amateur for the third time, leading the qualifying and then beating Ivo Whitton in the semi-final at the 19th hole, and Hugh Smith 8&7 in the final.

In 1930 Nettlefold had his best chance of winning the Australian Open. He was in second place, a stroke behind Frank Eyre, after the first 36 holes. He scored 74 in the third round, to be level with Eyre, and six ahead of the rest of the field. However, he took 87 in the final round and finished tied for 5th place. In the Australian Amateur he lost in the quarter-finals to the eventual winner, Harry Hattersley, a match that went to the 38th hole. Earlier in the year he had reached the final of the Victorian Amateur Championship, losing 2&1 to Mick Ryan. He won both the Tasmanian Open and the Tasmanian Amateur in 1930.

Nettlefold travelled to Sydney for the 1931 championship meeting but had little success, losing by two holes in the first round of the Australian Amateur to Clive Nigel Smith. He won the Tasmanian Open but lost 3&1 to Terence Brown in the final of the Tasmanian Amateur. Nettlefold reached the semi-finals of the 1932 Australian Amateur at Royal Adelaide, losing 3&2 to Reg Bettington. He also won the Tasmanian Open and the Tasmanian Amateur. He reached the quarter-finals of the Australian Amateur at Royal Melbourne in 1933, losing 3&1 to Jim Ferrier. He finished down the field in the Tasmanian Open and, although he reached the final of the Tasmanian Amateur, he lost 5&4 to Peter Brown. Nettlefold won both the Tasmanian Open and the Tasmanian Amateur in 1934. He qualified for the Australian Amateur at Royal Sydney but lost again to Ferrier, this time in the first round.

After 1934 Nettlefold played less golf outside Tasmania, although he continued to have success domestically. He won the Tasmanian Open in 1935, 1936, 1937 and 1947 and the Tasmanian Amateur in 1936 and 1939, completing 8 wins in each event.

In 1938 Nettlefold travelled to Britain as part of a four-man Australian team which included Harry Hattersley, Tom McKay and Mick Ryan. The team arrived in mid-May and played in The Amateur Championship at Troon. Nettlefold had been ill and lost in the first round. The team stayed for the 1938 Open Championship in early July but Nettlefold failed to qualify. Nettlefold made an albatross-2 at the 517-yard 16th hole at Portmarnock during the second round of the Irish Open but only just qualified for the final day.

Nettlefold was president of the Tasmanian Golf Council from 1947 to 1960 and a Tasmanian state delegate to the Australian Golf Union for periods between 1932 and 1956.

== Later life ==
In the mid-1930s, Nettlefold became managing director of the family motor-trade business. During World War II, he served as an intelligence officer. He received a CBE in the 1960 Birthday Honours. He died following a heart attack, on 4 October 1971, in Honolulu, Hawaii, returning from a trip to the United Kingdom. He left an estate valued at more than A$1,200,000.

== Tournament wins ==
- 1924 Tasmanian Amateur
- 1926 Australian Amateur, Tasmanian Amateur
- 1928 Australian Amateur
- 1929 Tasmanian Amateur
- 1930 Tasmanian Open, Tasmanian Amateur
- 1931 Tasmanian Open
- 1932 Tasmanian Open, Tasmanian Amateur
- 1934 Tasmanian Open, Tasmanian Amateur
- 1935 Tasmanian Open
- 1936 Tasmanian Open, Tasmanian Amateur
- 1937 Tasmanian Open
- 1939 Tasmanian Amateur
- 1947 Tasmanian Open

== Team appearances ==
- Australian Men's Interstate Teams Matches (representing Tasmania): 1921, 1924, 1925, 1928, 1930, 1947, 1948, 1949
