= Boddington (surname) =

Boddington is a surname. Notable people with the surname include:

- Craig Boddington (born 1952), American hunter
- Diana Boddington (1921–2002), British stage manager
- Edward Boddington, New Zealand cricketer
- Edwin Henry Boddington, English painter
- Ewart Boddington (1927–2015), English brewing executive
- Gary Boddington, South African field hockey player
- George Boddington, Australian rugby league player
- Ghislaine Boddington, British artist
- Harold Boddington (active 1903–05), English footballer
- Henry Boddington, New Zealand cricketer
- Henry John Boddington (1811–1865), British landscape painter
- Jennie Boddington (1922–2015), Australian filmmaker and photography curator
- Karen Boddington, Australian singer-songwriter
- Korey Boddington, Australian Paralympic cyclist
- Myles Boddington (1924–2002), English cricketer and golf administrator
- Peter Boddington (1942–2020), British boxer
- Richard Boddington, British-Canadian film director
- Robert Boddington (1892–1977), English cricketer
- Samuel Boddington (1766–1843), Irish politician
- Shaye Boddington (born 1986), New Zealand diver
- Thomas Boddington (1736–1821), English activist and merchant in the West Indies
- William Boddington (1910–1996), American field hockey player
