= Kirk-Windeyer Cup =

Tournament information
- Established: 1927
- Format: Team golf
- Final year: 1934

Final champion
- New Zealand

The Kirk-Windeyer Cup was an amateur team golf tournament, played between New Zealand and individual states of Australia. It was played annually from 1927 to 1930, then in 1932 and, finally, in 1934. New Zealand and New South Wales played in all six contests but the other states only entered occasionally. New Zealand and New South Wales each won the event three times.

The cup was established by Richard Clement Kirk, the president of the New Zealand Golf Association, and William Archibald Windeyer, an Australian golf administrator.

== Format ==
The final consisted of two foursomes matches followed by four singles matches. Originally matches were over 18 holes and the cup was completed in a single day. However, from 1929 matches were extended to 36 holes with foursomes on the first day and singles on the second day. All matches were played out to the full 18 or 36 holes. The result was decided by matches won, but in the event of a tie the result was decided by the number of holes won. Teams consisted of a maximum of 5 players.

== Results ==
The following table list the results of the finals.

Year	Date(s)	Venue	Location	Winning team	Score		Losing finalist	Ref
1927	9 Jun	Royal Sydney Golf Club	Rose Bay, New South Wales	New Zealand	4	2	Victoria	
1928	30 Jan	Miramar Golf Club	Wellington, New Zealand	New South Wales	3	3	New Zealand	
1929	12–13 Aug	Metropolitan Golf Club	South Oakleigh, Victoria	New South Wales	3½	2½	New Zealand	
1930	16–17 Apr	Christchurch Golf Club	Shirley, New Zealand	New Zealand	4½	1½	New South Wales	
1932	15–16 Jun	Royal Sydney Golf Club	Rose Bay, New South Wales	New South Wales	4	2	New Zealand	
1934	6–7 Apr	Auckland Golf Club	Middlemore, New Zealand	New Zealand	4	2	New South Wales	

New South Wales won the 1928 match on holes won. They were ahead by 10 holes in the three matches won while New Zealand were only 6 holes up in their winning three matches.

In 1927 Victoria beat Queensland 4–0 and then beat New South Wales later the same day, to qualify for the final. The match against New South Wales was tied 2–2 but Victoria qualified on holes won. In 1929 New South Wales beat Victoria 3½–2½ in a preliminary match. In 1930 New Zealand beat Victoria 3½–2½ in a preliminary match. In 1932 Queensland played, losing 6–0 to New South Wales in a preliminary match. In 1928 and 1934 only two teams contested the event.

== Teams ==
=== New Zealand ===
- 1927 Arthur Duncan, Bill Horton, Leo Quin, Kenneth Ross. Ewen Macfarlane travelled but did not play in any matches
- 1928 Donald Grant, Bill Horton, Sloan Morpeth, Kenneth Ross
- 1929 Jack Black, Bill Horton, Sloan Morpeth, Kenneth Ross
- 1930 Jack Black, Bill Horton, Ewen Macfarlane, Kenneth Ross. Arthur Duncan stood down and did not play in any matches
- 1932 Harold Black, Harold Brinsden, John Hornabrook, Bryan Silk, Rana Wagg
- 1934 John Hornabrook, Bill Horton, B.H. Menzies, Bryan Silk, Pip Wright

=== New South Wales ===
- 1927 John Bettington, G E Dennett, Henry McClelland, Clive Nigel Smith
- 1928 Bill Dobson, Robert Lee Brown, Clive Nigel Smith, Wally Smith
- 1929 Eric Apperly, George Fawcett, Keith Harrison, Stan Keane, Hector Morrison
- 1930 Robert Lee Brown, Bill Dobson, Harry Hattersley, Stan Keane
- 1932 Reg Bettington, Jim Ferrier, George Thompson, Bob Withycombe
- 1934 Eric Apperly, H M Cutler, Bill Dobson, Frank Hughes, Cyril Ruwald

=== Queensland ===
- 1927 Clive Boyce, W F R Boyce, R H Cumming, T Hall
- 1932 R H Cumming, T Munro, T Trude, G Whatmore

=== Victoria ===
- 1927 Peter Headlam, Alex Russell, Abe Schlapp, Ivo Whitton
- 1929 Fred Bulte, Bob Hancock, Alex Russell, Mick Ryan
- 1930 Fred Bulte, Bob Hancock, Alex Russell, Mick Ryan
