= Victorian Amateur Championship =

Amateur golf tournament

Tournament information
- Location: Victoria, Australia
- Established: 1899
- Format: Match play

Current champion
- Joseph Owen

The Victorian Amateur Championship is the state amateur golf championship of Victoria, Australia. It has been played annually since 1899, except for the war years.

Two players have won the championship six times, Michael Scott between 1904 and 1910, and Eric Routley between 1952 and 1966. Ivo Whitton won five times between 1919 and 1924, while Harry Williams won five times in the 1930s.

== Format ==
The event is a match play tournament. Matches are over 18 holes, except for the final which is over 36 holes. Normally the leading 32 players in the Port Phillip Open Amateur qualify. In 2020 the number of qualifiers was reduced to 8, the championship being played over two days instead three. In 2021 and 2022 there were 16 qualifiers, the championship again being played over two days with an 18-hole final.

The Port Phillip Open Amateur is a 72-hole stroke-play tournament played at Commonwealth and Kingston Heath golf clubs immediately before the Victorian Amateur Championship.

== History ==
In 1894 the Melbourne Golf Club (later Royal Melbourne) founded the "Victorian Golf Cup" open to "all amateurs in Australasia". The Victorian Golf Cup rapidly established itself as the most important tournament in Australia, and was regarded as the Amateur Championship of Australia. The Australian Golf Union was formed in 1898 and organised its first championship meeting at Royal Sydney Golf Club in May 1899, the main event being the Amateur Championship. Although the Victorian Golf Cup continued in 1899, the Amateur Championship at the AGU championship immediately replaced it with the Amateur Championship of Australia. Despite some initial confusion, the Victorian Golf Cup became established as the Amateur Championship of Victoria. In 1897 and 1898, the Victorian Golf Cup was played as a 72-hole stroke-play event, and the same format was used in 1899. Jim Howden was the winner, by 3 strokes, with a score of 354.

Jim Howden won again in 1900, followed by Walter Carre Riddell in 1901, who finished 19 strokes ahead of the runner-up. In 1902 Royal Melbourne hosted the AGU championship meeting for the first time. No separate Victorian championship was arranged, the winner of the Australian Amateur simultaneously becoming the champion of Victoria and holder of the Victorian Golf Cup. Hugh MacNeil, a Scottish-born New Zealander who had recently moved to Sydney was the winner with a score of 328. There was tie for second place between Peter Anderson and Walter Carre Riddell, and a short 8-hole playoff was arranged to determine the winner of the second prize, Riddell winning by a stroke. Riddell won for the second time in 1903, this time by 27 strokes.

Michael Scott, the youngest son of the Earl of Eldon, had emigrated to Australia in about 1900 but had played little golf until 1904. Scott immediately showed that he was one of the leading golfers in Australia, winning the inaugural Australian Open and, later in 1904, the Victorian championship. He would eventually win all six Victorian championships that he played in, from 1904 to 1910, before his permanent return to the United Kingdom in 1911. He didn't compete in 1906, having made returned to the UK, enabling Riddell to win the event for a third time. William Bruce, an ex-Test cricketer, was the runner-up in 1905, having taken up golf after his cricketeting career had ended. Norman Brookes was the runner-up in 1906. He was better known as a tennis player, winning Wimbledon twice, in 1907 and 1914. There was another tie for second place in 1908 between Brookes and Audley Lemprière, Lemprière winning a 4-hole playoff to take the second prize. Lemprière won the championship in 1911, with Ivo Whitton runner-up. The 1913 Australian championship meeting was originally planned to be played at The Australian Golf Club in Sydney, but was moved to Royal Melbourne because of a smallpox outbreak and the poor condition of the course, caused by wet weather. As a result, the Victorian Amateur Championship was played as part of the Metropolitan Golf Club's annual meeting. Following closely after the Australian championship meeting, many of the leading Victorian golfers could not attend for business reasons. The championship was won by Gordon Burnham, an Aide-de-Camp to the Governor-General of Australia.

Ivo Whitton was a runner-up in 1911 but didn't play in 1912, 1913 or 1914. When the championship resumed in 1919, after World War I, Whitton was the winner, 8 strokes ahead of Bruce Pearce. 1920 saw two major changes, the venue varied from year to year, the 1920 championship being played at Victoria Golf Club, and the championship was the first to be played by match play. There was a 36-hole stroke-play stage with the leading 16 qualifying. Matches were over 18 holes, except for the final which was over 36 holes. Whitton retained his title, beating Pearce in the final. The 1921 championship returned to stroke-play but match-play was restored in 1922, with 8 qualifiers playing three rounds of 36-hole match-play. Whitton didn't play in 1921 but won again in 1922, 1923 and 1924, a run of 5 wins in 6 years. The winner continued to receive the Victorian Golf Cup, and a permanent trophy valued at 5 guineas, with the runner-up getting a trophy valued at 3 guineas. The number of qualifiers was increased to 16 in 1929, with 4 days of 36-hole match play.

Harry Williams dominated the 1930s, winning 5 times between 1931 and 1939. Mick Ryan won twice, in 1930 and 1932, but lost three finals to Williams, in 1931, 1934 and 1936. The format was revised in 1937, the championship becoming match-play only, with matches over 18 holes except for the final. In 1939 there was a return to the 36-hole stroke-play stage, but with 32 qualifiers. All matches were then over 36 holes.

1946 saw a return to the format used in 1937 and 1938. Peter Thomson won in 1948, his last before turning professional. Thomson beat Doug Bachli in the final but Bachli would win in 1949 and 1950 and for a third time in 1953. Bill Edgar won for a third time in 1951, his previous wins being in 1927 and 1938. In 1951 there were 88 entries and a 36-hole stroke-play event was organised to reduce the field to 64. Many of the leading players complained about the arrangement and the format was revised in 1952, with the leading 16 amateurs in the Victorian Close Championship qualifying, all matches being over 36 holes. Eric Routley won the championship in 1952, the first of six wins in the event. He won again in 1958, 1959, 1960, 1963 and 1966. There was no Close Championship in 1956 and a 36-hole amateur medal championship was organised instead, the leading 16 qualifying. From 1957 the Victorian Open acted as the qualifying event.

In 1964 the number of qualifiers was increased to 32, with the first two rounds of match-play being over 18 holes. John Lindsay was a three-time winner, in 1968, 1970 and 1983, as was Mike Cahill who won three years in a row from 1971 to 1973. Neil Titheridge won the championship two years in succession, in 1961 and 1962. Don Reiter won in 1967 and 1974 and was followed by his brother Alan in 1976. The 1990s saw a number of wins by players who went on to have successful professionals careers. Robert Allenby in 1990, Stuart Appleby in 1991, Geoff Ogilvy in 1997 and Aaron Baddeley in 1998, all won on the PGA Tour in America and reached the top-20 of the world rankings. A number of other winners would later reach the top-100 of the world rankings, including Mike Clayton, Bradley Hughes and Craig Spence, who each won the championship twice, and Marcus Fraser, James Morrison and Cameron Davis.

== Winners ==
Year	Winner	Score	Runner-up	Venue	Ref.
2022	Joseph Owen	2 & 1	Jeffrey Pullen	Royal Melbourne	
2021	Harrison Crowe (2)	2 & 1	Jack Buchanan	Peninsula Kingswood	
2020	Harrison Crowe	6 & 5	Joshua Greer	Metropolitan	
2019	Andre Lautee (2)	5 & 4	Lukas Michel	Kingston Heath	
2018	Andre Lautee	2 & 1	Kyle Michel	Huntingdale	
2017	David Micheluzzi	9 & 8	Zach Murray	Commonwealth	
2016	Dylan Perry	41 holes	John Lyras	Woodlands	
2015	Cameron John	6 & 4	David Micheluzzi	Commonwealth	
2014	Cameron Davis	7 & 5	Tom Power Horan	Victoria	
2013	Zach Murray	1 up	Todd Sinnott	Kingston Heath	
2012	Taylor Macdonald	4 & 3	Anthony Houston	Yarra Yarra	
2011	Nathan Holman	9 & 7	Troy Moses	Commonwealth	
2010	Jack Wilson	3 & 2	Ryan McCarthy	Woodlands	
2009	Kieran Pratt	3 & 1	Tim Hart	Kingston Heath	
2008	Luke Bleumink	39 holes	Ryan McCarthy	Sanctuary Lakes	
2007	Leighton Lyle	2 & 1	Kieran Pratt	Royal Melbourne	
2006	Aaron Pike	2 & 1	David McKendrick	The Heritage	
2005	James Morrison	1 up	Aaron Pike	Spring Valley	
2004	Steven Jones	2 & 1	Andrew Martin	Portsea	
2003	Gavin Flint	2 & 1	Adam Porker	Cranbourne	
2002	Luke Hickmott	5 & 4	Marc Leishman	Peninsula	
2001	Craig Scott	2 & 1	Ashley Hall	Woodlands	
2000	Michael Cocking	3 & 2	Andrew Webster	Southern	
1999	Marcus Fraser	4 & 3	Marcus Burns	Kingston Heath	
1998	Aaron Baddeley	4 & 3	Ben Meyers	Yarra Yarra	
1997	Geoff Ogilvy	6 & 5	Ed Stedman	Commonwealth	
1996	Cameron Percy	5 & 4	Geoff Ogilvy	Victoria	
1995	Craig Spence (2)	3 & 1	Jamie McCallum	Kingswood	
1994	Craig Spence	2 & 1	Gavin Vearing	Metropolitan	
1993	David Bransdon	7 & 6	Stephen Symons	Spring Valley	
1992	Adam Henwood	5 & 4	Stephen Symons	Huntingdale	
1991	Stuart Appleby	7 & 6	Euan Walters	Kingston Heath	
1990	Robert Allenby	3 & 2	Jamie Taylor	Kew	
1989	Stephen McCraw	4 & 3	Peter Sweeney	Kingswood	
1988	Bradley Hughes (2)	3 & 1	Stephen McCraw	Yarra Yarra	
1987	Bradley Hughes	5 & 4	Peter Campbell	Woodlands	
1986	Paul Moloney	3 & 2	Paul Thompson	Metropolitan	
1985	Michael Sammells	5 & 4	John Cole	Huntingdale	
1984	David Briggs	37 holes	Terry Jones	Yarra Yarra	
1983	John Lindsay (3)	3 & 2	Doug Perry	Victoria	
1982	Alan Lehner	5 & 4	John Munro	Royal Melbourne	
1981	Mike Clayton (2)	1 up	Peter Sweeney	Commonwealth	
1980	Darren Cole	9 & 8	Peter Junor	Kingston Heath	
1979	Ray Jenner	8 & 7	Jim Kirby	Woodlands	
1978	Peter Sweeney	7 & 6	John Hood	Royal Melbourne	
1977	Mike Clayton			Metropolitan	
1976	Alan Reiter	1 up	Rick Wines	Huntingdale	
1975	Rick Wines	37 holes	Peter Bleazby	Yarra Yarra	
1974	Don Reiter (2)	6 & 5	Alan Reiter	Victoria	
1973	Mike Cahill (3)	3 & 2	Ray Jenner	Commonwealth	
1972	Mike Cahill (2)	8 & 7	Ray Jenner	Kingston Heath	
1971	Mike Cahill	4 & 3	Ken Kilburn	Kingswood	
1970	John Lindsay (2)	37 holes	Tony Limon	Metropolitan	
1969	Kevin Hartley	12 & 10	Tony Limon	Royal Melbourne	
1968	John Lindsay	2 up	Eric Routley	Huntingdale	
1967	Don Reiter	3 & 2	Graham Marsh	Victoria	
1966	Eric Routley (6)	2 up	Roger Cowan	Woodlands	
1965	Harry McGain	2 & 1	Ken Kilburn	Metropolitan	
1964	Eric Wishart	6 & 5	Don Moir	Yarra Yarra	
1963	Eric Routley (5)	7 & 6	Les O'Shea	Commonwealth	
1962	Neil Titheridge (2)	2 & 1	Les O'Shea	Kingston Heath	
1961	Neil Titheridge	3 & 2	Tom Crow	Riversdale	
1960	Eric Routley (4)	6 & 5	Doug Bachli	Woodlands	
1959	Eric Routley (3)	6 & 5	John Hood	Huntingdale	
1958	Eric Routley (2)	2 & 1	Tom Crow	Commonwealth	
1957	Barry West	1 up	Tom Crow	Yarra Yarra	
1956	Tom Crow	2 up	Eric Routley	Victoria	
1955	Hartley Mitchell	2 & 1	Bill Edgar	Northern	
1954	Bob Bull	6 & 5	Geoff Wagstaff	Riversdale	
1953	Doug Bachli (3)	2 up	Peter Toogood	Royal Melbourne	
1952	Eric Routley	1 up	Bill Edgar	Kingston Heath	
1951	Bill Edgar (3)	4 & 3	Jack O'Sullivan	Kingswood	
1950	Doug Bachli (2)	8 & 6	Jack O'Sullivan	Huntingdale	
1949	Doug Bachli	2 & 1	Barry West	Kew	
1948	Peter Thomson	6 & 4	Doug Bachli	Woodlands	
1947	Dick Payne	3 & 2	Bill Edgar	Commonwealth	
1946	Bob Brown	1 up	Eric Routley	Commonwealth	
1940–1945 No tournament due to World War II
1939	Harry Williams (5)	5 & 3	Laurie Duffy	Yarra Yarra	
1938	Bill Edgar (2)	12 & 10	Dick Buxton	Victoria	
1937	Bill Higgins	2 & 1	Dick Payne	Riversdale	
1936	Harry Williams (4)	4 & 3	Mick Ryan	Royal Melbourne	
1935	Harry Williams (3)	2 & 1	Alex King	Kingston Heath	
1934	Harry Williams (2)	8 & 6	Mick Ryan	Woodlands	
1933	Gus Jackson (2)	3 & 2	Harry Williams	Metropolitan	
1932	Mick Ryan (2)	7 & 6	Alex Rae	Yarra Yarra	
1931	Harry Williams	4 & 3	Mick Ryan	Victoria	
1930	Mick Ryan	2 & 1	Len Nettlefold	Victoria	
1929	Sloan Morpeth	2 & 1	Bob Hancock	Commonwealth	
1928	Bill Fowler	9 & 8	Legh Winser	Kingston Heath	
1927	Bill Edgar	1 up	Alex Russell	Metropolitan	
1926	Gus Jackson	38 holes	Alex Russell	Metropolitan	
1925	Alex Russell	10 & 9	William Bailey	Royal Melbourne	
1924	Ivo Whitton (5)	3 & 2	Abe Schlapp	Victoria	
1923	Ivo Whitton (4)	6 & 4	Abe Schlapp	Metropolitan	
1922	Ivo Whitton (3)	2 & 1	Eric Quirk	Royal Melbourne	

Year	Winner	Score	Margin of victory	Runner-up	Venue	Ref.
1921	George Fawcett	305	6 strokes	Bruce Pearce	Metropolitan	
1920	Ivo Whitton (2)	7 & 5		Bruce Pearce	Victoria	
1919	Ivo Whitton	314	8 strokes	Bruce Pearce	Royal Melbourne	
1915–1918 No tournament due to World War I
1914	Eric Quirk	322	Playoff	Frank Murdoch	Royal Melbourne	
1913	Gordon Burnham	332	1 stroke	Douglas Morrison	Metropolitan	
1912	Frank Murdoch	325	12 strokes	Charles Kirkby	Royal Melbourne	
1911	Audley Lemprière	328	9 strokes	Ivo Whitton	Royal Melbourne	
1910	Michael Scott (6)	321	22 strokes	Bruce Pearce	Royal Melbourne	
1909	Michael Scott (5)	337	8 strokes	Clyde Pearce	Royal Melbourne	
1908	Michael Scott (4)	355	5 strokes	Audley Lemprière; Norman Brookes	Royal Melbourne	
1907	Michael Scott (3)	337	8 strokes	Walter Carre Riddell	Royal Melbourne	
1906	Walter Carre Riddell (3)	332	6 strokes	Norman Brookes	Royal Melbourne	
1905	Michael Scott (2)	354	17 strokes	William Bruce	Royal Melbourne	
1904	Michael Scott	313	14 strokes	Leslie Penfold Hyland	Royal Melbourne	
1903	Walter Carre Riddell (2)	323	27 strokes	Jim Howden	Royal Melbourne	
1902	Hugh MacNeil	328	6 strokes	Peter Anderson; Walter Carre Riddell	Royal Melbourne	
1901	Walter Carre Riddell	343	19 strokes	Leslie Penfold Hyland	Royal Melbourne	
1900	Jim Howden (2)	361	7 strokes	Walter Carre Riddell	Royal Melbourne	
1899	Jim Howden	354	3 strokes	Frank Stewart	Royal Melbourne	

Additional source:
