= Harry Williams (golfer) =

Australian amateur golfer

Personal information
- Full name: Harry Llewellyn Carlington Williams
- Nationality: Australia
- Born: 12 July 1915 Elsternwick, Melbourne, Victoria, Australia
- Died: 13 December 1961 (aged 46) East Kew, Melbourne, Victoria, Australia

Career
- Sport: Golf
- Status: Amateur

Harry Llewellyn Carlington Williams (12 July 1915 – 22 December 1961) was an Australian amateur golfer. He won the Australian Amateur in 1931 and 1937.

== Early life ==
Williams was born on 12 July 1915 in Elsternwick, Melbourne, the son of Eric Llewellyn Williams and his wife Emma Madge Dagmar, née Halfey. He started playing golf at Elsternwick Golf Club, later moving to Commonwealth Golf Club and to Victoria Golf Club in 1931. His father died of pneumonia in 1933 at the age of 39, and money inherited from his father together with his mother's independent income, meant that Williams could play golf full time.

== Golf career ==
In August 1931, at the age of 16, Williams won the Victorian Amateur Championship, beating Mick Ryan in the final. The following month he won the Australian Amateur at The Australian Golf Club, beating George Thompson 3&2 in the final. He won again in 1937, on the same course, beating Tom Tanner by one hole in the final. Williams was also runner-up twice, losing to Reg Bettington in 1932 and to Jim Ferrier in 1939.

Williams was runner-up at Metropolitan Golf Club in the 1936 Australian Open behind Gene Sarazen. He was two strokes behind Sarazen after three rounds and had a bad first-nine of 39 in the final round. However he came home in 34 to finish second, four behind Sarazen.

Williams eventually won the Victorian Amateur Championship five times, in 1931, 1934, 1935, 1936 and 1939. He also won the Riversdale Cup three times, in 1930, 1932 and 1934, with Mick Ryan runner-up each time.

== Later life ==
Williams played little top-level golf after World War II. He died, with his mother, in their flat in East Kew, Melbourne on 13 December 1961. Their bodies were found after the landlady smelled gas coming from the flat. The gas on the kitchen stove was on and his mother had left a suicide note. In 2002, he was named as one of the twelve members of the Victorian golfing team of the 20th century.

== Team appearances ==
- Australian Men's Interstate Teams Matches (representing Victoria): 1931 (winners), 1932, 1934, 1936 (winners), 1937, 1938, 1939 (winners)
