= Riversdale Cup =

Amateur golf tournament in Victoria, Australia

The Riversdale Cup is the second oldest amateur golf tournament in Australia. It is a Golf Australia national ranking event. The event has been played since 1896 and is organised by and played at the Riversdale Golf Club in Mount Waverley, Victoria. It was known as the Surrey Hills Gentlemen's Championship, Gold Medal from 1896 to 1907, the Riversdale Trophy from 1909 to 1926, and the Riversdale Cup since 1928. The men's event has been played as a 72-hole stroke play tournament since 1958 when Kevin Hartley won for the first time. The All Abilities Riversdale Cup commenced in 2020.

== Men's winners ==
- 2026 Josiah Edwards
- 2025 Max Moring
- 2024 Blaike Perkins
- 2023 Phoenix Campbell
- 2022 Max Ford
- 2021 Andrew Richards
- 2020 Lawrence Curtis
- 2019 Chris Crabtree
- 2018 Jack Thompson
- 2017 Dylan Perry
- 2016 Harrison Endycott
- 2015 Travis Smyth
- 2014 Ryan Ruffels
- 2013 Brady Watt
- 2012 Jake Higginbottom
- 2011 Nathan Holman
- 2010 Jin Jeong
- 2009 Jordan Sherratt
- 2008 Scott Arnold
- 2007 Tim Stewart
- 2006 Steve Dartnell
- 2005 Mathew Holten
- 2004 Michael Sim
- 2003 Kurt Barnes
- 2002 Richard Moir
- 2001 Shannon Jones
- 2000 Andrew Webster
- 1999 Aaron Baddeley
- 1998 Brendan Jones
- 1997 James McLean
- 1996 Jarrod Moseley
- 1995 Lee Eagleton
- 1994 Lester Peterson
- 1993 Jason Dawes
- 1992 Lester Peterson
- 1991 Robert Allenby
- 1990 Robert Allenby
- 1989 Paul Moloney
- 1988 David Ecob
- 1987 Stephen Taylor
- 1986 Michael Sammels
- 1985 Stephen Taylor
- 1984 Chris Longley
- 1983 John Lindsay
- 1982 Trevor Henley
- 1981 Mike Clayton
- 1980 Geoff Sowden
- 1979 Eric Routley
- 1978 Kevin Hartley
- 1977 Kevin Hartley
- 1976 Kevin Hartley
- 1975 Trevor Henley
- 1974 Bill Britten
- 1973 Alan Reiter
- 1972 Neil Titheridge
- 1971 Kevin Hartley
- 1970 Randall Hicks
- 1969 Bill Britten
- 1968 Kevin Hartley
- 1967 Kevin Hartley
- 1966 Bill Britten
- 1965 Kevin Hartley
- 1964 Kevin Hartley
- 1963 Kevin Hartley
- 1962 Tom Crow
- 1961 Tom Crow
- 1960 John Hood
- 1959 Bob Bull
- 1958 Kevin Hartley
- 1957 Barry West
- 1956 Peter Crow
- 1955 Alex Rae
- 1954 D B Kendler
- 1953 F T Kennett
- 1952 Laurie Duffy
- 1951 D Cade
- 1950 David Doughton
- 1949 A P Launder
- 1948 Bill Higgins
- 1947 Bill Higgins
- 1946 Laurie Duffy
- 1939–45 No tournament
- 1938 Alex Rae
- 1937 Bill Higgins
- 1936 Bill Edgar
- 1935 Mick Ryan
- 1934 Harry Williams
- 1933 Mick Ryan
- 1932 Harry Williams
- 1931 Alex Russell
- 1930 Harry Williams
- 1929 Alex Russell
- 1928 Fred Lemann
- 1927 No tournament
- 1926 Ivo Whitton
- 1925 Ivo Whitton
- 1924 Bruce Pearce
- 1923 Abe Schlapp
- 1922 Bruce Pearce
- 1921 Bruce Pearce
- 1920 George Fawcett
- 1919 Gus Jackson
- 1915–18 No tournament
- 1914 Frank Murdoch
- 1913 Ivo Whitton
- 1912 Ivo Whitton
- 1911 Audley Lemprière
- 1910 Frank Murdoch
- 1909 George Morrison
- 1908 No tournament
- 1907 Frank Murdoch
- 1906 Hector Morrison
- 1905 Michael Scott
- 1904 Leslie Penfold Hyland
- 1903 Louis Whyte
- 1902 P. C. Anderson
- 1901 William McIntyre
- 1900 Harry Howden
- 1899 P. C. Anderson
- 1898 P. C. Anderson
- 1897 Thomas Huggins
- 1896 Mark Anderson

== Women's winners ==
This list is incomplete

- 2026 Jazy Roberts
- 2025 Ann Jang
- 2024 Caitlin Peirce
- 2023 Amelia Harris
- 2022 Abbie Teasdale
- 2021 Jeneath Wong
- 2020 Jeneath Wong
- 2019 Yuna Nishimura
- 2018 Rebecca Kay
- 2017 Karis Davidson
- 2016 Kirsty Hodgkins
- 2015 Munchin Keh
- 2014 Shelly Shin
- 2013 Grace Lennon
- 2012 Whitney Hillier
- 2011 Cecilia Cho
- 2010 Jessica Speechley
- 2009 Ashlee Dewhurst
- 2008 Julia Boland
- 2007 Inhong Lim
- 2006 Inhong Lim
- 2005 Nicki Garrett
- 2004 Dana Lacey
- 2003 Sarah Kemp

== All-Abilities winners ==
- 2025 Tom Ryan
- 2024
- 2023 Noah Schammer
- 2022 Mike Brown
- 2021 Warren Sutton
- 2020 Warren Sutton
