= Riversdale Golf Club =

Golf club in Victoria, Australia

Club information
- Established: 1892; 134 years ago
- Type: Private
- Website: https://www.riversdalegolf.com.au/

The Riversdale Golf Club is a golf club in Mount Waverley, Victoria, Australia and is the oldest club in Victoria behind Royal Melbourne. It hosted the Australian PGA Championship, Riversdale Cup, Victorian Amateur Championship, Victorian Open and Victorian PGA Championship.

The golf club, originally located at Mont Albert, Victoria and named Surrey Hills Golf Club, was established in 1892. It later moved to Camberwell, Victoria, then to its current site in Mount Waverly. The current course layout, which opened in 1930, was designed by Australian Open champion Alex Russell.
