= Charles Fiddian-Green =

English cricketer

Cricket information
- Batting: Right-handed
- Bowling: Right-arm medium

Career statistics
Competition	First-class
Matches	107
Runs scored	4,350
Batting average	31.07
100s/50s	4/28
Top score	120
Balls bowled	562
Wickets	6
Bowling average	62.00
5 wickets in innings	0
10 wickets in match	0
Best bowling	1/6
Catches/stumpings	71/1
- Source: Cricinfo, 7 November 2022

Charles Anderson Fiddian Fiddian-Green (22 December 1898 – 5 September 1976) was an English cricketer: an opening batsman who played 107 first-class matches between the wars, playing county cricket for both Warwickshire and Worcestershire, as well as university cricket for Cambridge University.

Fiddian-Green first played in June 1920 against Cambridge University. He was by this time a student at Jesus College, having gone there at the age of 21 because of the First World War, but in this match he played for Warwickshire. He had a quiet game, scoring 1 and 23 not out, taking one catch and bowling a single over. He played another 14 times for the county that season, although only rarely did he catch the eye: he made 53* (albeit out of 603/9 declared) against Worcestershire in early August, and in other games took two wickets: those of Lancashire's Robert Boddington and Middlesex's future Test all-rounder Nigel Haig.

In 1921 Fiddian-Green had a much better season for both Cambridge and Warwickshire, passing 1000 first-class runs for the first of two occasions (the other being the following year); his aggregate of 1079 was the best of his career. He won his blue, scoring 17 in his only visit to the crease as Cambridge beat Oxford by an innings. He passed fifty eight times in his 38 innings, although he never managed to go on to three figures; his highest score of the season was the 95 he hit for Cambridge against Warwickshire in June.

1922 saw him gain a second blue – and again Cambridge won by an innings – but the match was perhaps more remarkable for the manner of Fiddian-Green's dismissal. He was bowled for 23 by Thomas Raikes by a ball which was said to have pitched so wide as to be almost off the mown area of the pitch. He enjoyed excellent form with the bat for much of the season, averaging 42.28 in all first-class cricket and 49.21 for Cambridge alone. In one purple patch in mid-season, he scored 83, 103, 113 and 120 in successive innings; this last, against HDG Leveson-Gower's XI, remained the highest score of his career. He was also selected to represent the Gentlemen against the Players at Lord's, where he made 27 and 1.

Fiddian-Green then became a master, and head of cricket, at Malvern College, and played no first-class cricket in 1923. However, for the following few years he did turn out for Warwickshire a few times a season during the school holidays, usually scoring good runs. There was then another gap until 1931, when he appeared for Worcestershire and scored 108 on debut against Essex. He kept wicket on a couple of occasions, and stumped Arthur Pothecary of Hampshire in August 1933.

His final first-class appearance came against his old university in late June 1934, when he made 5 and 45. Outside cricket, Fiddian-Green represented Cambridge University at both hockey and golf. He died in Malvern, Worcestershire, at the age of 77.
