= Beddington (surname) =

Beddington is a surname, and may refer to:

- Jack Beddington (1893–1959), British advertising executive during World War II
- John Beddington (born 1945), population biologist, Chief Scientific Adviser to the UK Government from 2008 to 2013
- Reginald Beddington (1877–1962), English angler and humanitarian
- Rosa Beddington (1956–2001), British developmental biologist
- Roy Beddington (1910–1995), British painter, illustrator, fisherman, poet, writer on fishing, and journalist
- Sarah Beddington (born 1964), British artist and filmmaker
