= Royal Hobart Golf Club =

Golf club in Seven Mile Beach, Tasmania, Australia

- Interactive map of Royal Hobart Golf Club
- 42.8554°S 147.4985°E

Club information
- Location: Seven Mile Beach, Tasmania, Australia
- Established: Newlands Golf Club 1896, Hobart Golf Club 1901, Royal Hobart Golf Club 1925
- Type: Public
- Tota holes: 18
- Tournaments: Tasmanian Open, Australian Amateur, Australian Women's Amateur, Australian Open
- Website: www.rhgc.com.au
- Designed by: Vern Morcom (1956)
- Par: 72
- Length: 6,174 metres

The Royal Hobart Golf Club is a golf club in Seven Mile Beach, Tasmania, Australia, near Hobart. It hosted the Australian Open in 1971 when American Jack Nicklaus was the winner. It also hosted the Tasmanian Open (1968, 1976, 1980, 1986, 1991, and 2003), Australian Amateur (1968, 1974, 1987, 1993, 2000, and 2006), and Australian Women's Amateur (1968, 1978, 1990, and 1997).

Jason Day in capturing the Australian Amateur Championship winner in 2006 held at the Royal Hobart Golf Club, shot the course record of 64 to break the course record previously held by Jack Nicklaus.

On 5 April 2021 club member and professional golfer Simon Hawkes, shot a new course record of 61 which was highlighted by an albatross on the iconic 9th hole.

Designed by Vern Morcom, who was also responsible for the Woodrising Course at Devonport Golf Club, Spreyton.

== Notable members ==
- Bruce Pearce – Australian Open
- Clyde Pearce – 1908 Australian Open
- Elvie Whitesides – 1906 Australian Women's Amateur
- Betty Dalgleish – 1958 Tasmanian senior championship, 1968 Australian Women's Amateur, 1973 Ladies Professional Golf Association of Australia
- Lindy Goggin – 1971, 1977 and 1980 Australian Women's Amateur, 1973, 1976, 1980 and 1986 Victorian Women's Amateur Championship, Tasmanian Amateur×19 times from 1976 to 1991
- Peter Toogood – 1954 Australian Amateur, 1956 New Zealand Amateur Champion, Tasmanian Open×9 times
- Mathew Goggin – 1995 Australian Amateur, 1996 San Paolo Vita Open, 1998 Australasian Tour Championship, 1999 Omaha Classic

== See also ==
- List of golf clubs granted Royal status
- List of Australian organisations with royal patronage
