= International cricket in 1937 =

International cricket season

The 1937 International cricket season was from April 1937 to August 1937.

== Season overview ==
International tours
| Start date | Home team | Away team | Results [Matches] | | | |
| Start date | Home team | Away team | Test | ODI | FC | LA |
|---|---|---|---|---|---|---|
| 19 June 1937 | Ireland | Scotland | — | — | 1–0 [1] | — |
| 26 June 1937 | England | New Zealand | 1–0 [3] | — | — | — |
| 24 July 1937 | Marylebone | Netherlands | — | — | — | 1–0 [1] |
| 2 August 1937 | Netherlands | England | — | — | 1–1 [3] | — |

== June ==
=== Scotland in Ireland ===
Three-day Match
| No. | Date | Home captain | Away captain | Venue | Result |
|---|---|---|---|---|---|
| Match | 19–22 June | Jimmy Boucher | Alastair McTavish | Ormeau, Belfast | Ireland by 63 runs |

=== New Zealand in England ===
Test series
| No. | Date | Home captain | Away captain | Venue | Result |
|---|---|---|---|---|---|
| Test 260 | 26–29 June | Walter Robins | Curly Page | Lord's, London | Match drawn |
| Test 261 | 24–27 July | Walter Robins | Curly Page | Old Trafford Cricket Ground, Manchester | England by 130 runs |
| Test 262 | 14–17 August | Walter Robins | Curly Page | Kennington Oval, London | Match drawn |

== July ==
=== Netherlands in England ===
One-day match
| No. | Date | Home captain | Away captain | Venue | Result |
|---|---|---|---|---|---|
| Match | 24 July | Not mentioned | Hugo van Manen | Lord's, London | Marylebone won on first innings total |

== August ==
=== England in Netherlands ===
Two-day Match Series
| No. | Date | Home captain | Away captain | Venue | Result |
|---|---|---|---|---|---|
| Match 1 | 2–3 August | Not mentioned | Robert Boddington | The Hague | Free Foresters by 10 wickets |
| Match 2 | 4–5 August | Not mentioned | Robert Boddington | Laren | Match drawn |
| Match 3 | 7–8 August | Not mentioned | Robert Boddington | Amsterdam | All Holland by an innings and 102 runs |
