= Kevin Hartley =

Australian amateur golfer (1934–2020)

Personal information
- Full name: Kevin William Hartley
- Nickname: The Dart
- Nationality: Australia
- Born: 30 January 1934 Victoria, Australia
- Died: 22 December 2020 (aged 86) Melbourne, Victoria, Australia

Career
- Sport: Golf
- Status: Amateur

Kevin William Hartley (30 January 1934 – 22 December 2020) was an Australian amateur golfer. He won the Australian Amateur in 1958 and was part of the Australian team that won the 1966 Eisenhower Trophy.

== Golf career ==
Hartley won the 1958 Australian Amateur at Royal Adelaide, beating Noel Bartell in a final that went to extra holes. Bartell missed short putts for victory at the 36th and 38th holes before Hartley holed a long putt to win the match at the 39th. He reached the semi-finals the following year, 1959, losing to Bruce Devlin at the 20th hole. Hartley was the medalist in 1965, with a score of 140. He won the 1969 Victorian Amateur Championship, beating Tony Limon, 12 and 10, in the final. He had won the Victorian Boys' Championship in 1950.

Hartley won the Riversdale Cup ten times between 1958 and 1978. 1958 was the first time the event was played over 72 holes, Hartley winning by nine strokes. He won again in 1963, the start of a run of five wins in six years; he was runner-up by one stroke to Bill Britten in the other. He won again in 1971 and then three in succession from 1976 to 1978.

Hartley was a regular member of the Australian amateur team between 1959 and 1970. He played in four successive Eisenhower Trophy contests, including in the winning 1966 team in Mexico City. He also played in the Commonwealth Tournament three times between 1959 and 1967 and five times in the Sloan Morpeth Trophy against New Zealand. Australia were joint winner in the 1963 Commonwealth Tournament at Royal Sydney.

Hartley was a runner-up in the 1970 Victorian Open at Riversdale, four strokes behind David Graham. Five behind with eight holes to play, Hartley reduced the deficit to one, when he birdied the 11th and 12th, while Graham had bogeys on both holes. Hartley, however, had a poor finish and dropped into a tie for second place with Kel Nagle and Guy Wolstenholme.

== Personal life ==
Hartley was an engineer by profession, but was also involved in golf course design. In 2002, he was named as one of the twelve members of the Victorian golfing team of the 20th century. He died on 22 December 2020.

== Team appearances ==
- Eisenhower Trophy (representing Australia): 1964, 1966 (winners), 1968, 1970
- Commonwealth Tournament (representing Australia): 1959, 1963 (joint winners), 1967
- Sloan Morpeth Trophy (representing Australia): 1964 (winners), 1965, 1966 (winners), 1967 (winners), 1969 (winners)
- Australian Men's Interstate Teams Matches (representing Victoria): 1958, 1959, 1960, 1961 (winners), 1963 (winners), 1964, 1965, 1967, 1968, 1969, 1970, 1971, 1972, 1973
