= Tasmanian Open =

Australian golf tournament

Tournament information
- Location: Hobart, Tasmania, Australia
- Established: 1913
- Course: Kingston Beach Golf Club
- Par: 71
- Tour: PGA Tour of Australasia
- Format: Stroke play
- Month played: February

Tournament record score
- Aggregate: 269 Ted Ball (1964)
- To par: −17 Ian Roberts (1985)

Current champion
- (Australia) Simon Hawkes

Final champion
- Location in Australia Location in Tasmania

The Tasmanian Open is an annual golf tournament held in Tasmania, Australia.

== History ==
The Tasmanian amateur championship was first played in 1902 as a 36 hole stroke-play event. From 1910 the stroke-play acted as qualifying for a match-play stage, with the leading four players qualifying. In 1913 the 36 hole stroke-play event was opened up to professionals as well as amateurs and the winner became the Tasmanian Open champion. The first winner was an amateur, Eustace Headlam. This was the only event before World War I, the championship being revived in 1919 and was again won by Headlam. There was no Open championship between 1923 and 1929, the event again being restricted to amateurs. The 1922 Open was won by Robert Nettlefold and when it restarted in 1930 it was won by his son, Len Nettlefold, with Jock Robertson, the Kingston Beach professional, the runner-up. Len Nettlefold won the event 7 times in 8 years and won for an eighth time in 1947. In 1938 Alf Toogood, Jock Robertson's successor at Kingston Beach, became the first professional winner and he was followed by Denis Denehey in 1939.

After World War II, amateurs continued to be successful, including 19-year-old Peter Toogood, the son of Alf Toogood, in 1949. Alf himself won the following year, 1950, pushing Peter into second place. Peter Toogood won again in 1951 and would win every year from 1954 to 1959, matching Len Nettlefold's record of 8 championships. The Open was expanded to 72 holes in 1953. Ron Smith, an amateur from Victoria, won with 60-year-old Alf Toogood one of the runners-up.

In 1961, a small group of New South Wales professionals went on a promotional tour of Tasmania, and played in the Open. One of them, Alan Murray won, with two others, second and third. The following year the Tasmanian government gave a grant towards the Open, and the £1,000 prize money attracted a number of professionals. Frank Phillips and Peter Thomson tied on 279, but there was something of anti-climax since Thomson had assumed that Phillips would win and had left for the mainland, forfeiting the championship to Phillips. The £1,000 prize money continued for a few years, rising to A$10,000 by 1975 and reaching A$100,000 in 1988 and 1989. There had only been three professional wins up to 1960 but from 1961 to 1992 the situation reversed, with only one amateur winner in that period, Max Robison in 1978.

The 1991 event had prize money of A$85,000, failing to meet the minimum requirement for a tour event. From 1993 to 2022 the event failed to attract leading professionals and there was only one professional winner during that period, Simon Hawkes in 2016.

== Winners ==
Year	Winner	Score	To par	Margin of victory	Runner(s)-up	Venue	Ref.
Tasmanian Open
2025	(Australia) Simon Hawkes	207	−9	1 stroke	(Australia) Connor McDade	Launceston	
2024	(Australia) Alex Edge	207	−9	1 stroke	(Australia) Caleb Bovalina (Australia) Kyle Michel	Launceston	
2023	(Australia) Toby Walker (a)	204	−12	4 strokes	(Australia) William Bruyeres	Launceston	

- 2022 Samuel Slater (a)
- 2021 Joshua Fuller (a)
- 2020 Hayden Hopewell (a)
- 2019 Aiden Didone (a)
- 2018 No tournament
- 2017 Lee Chang-gi (a)
- 2016 Simon Hawkes
- 2015 Anthony Quayle (a)
- 2014 Jarryd Felton (a)
- 2013 Jordan Zunic (a)
- 2012 Ricky Kato (a)
- 2011 Matt Stieger (a)
- 2010 Jin Jeong (a)
- 2009 Ryan McCarthy (a)
- 2008 Tim Stewart (a)
- 2007 Rohan Blizard (a)
- 2006 Ben Parker (a)
- 2005 Ashley Hall (a)
- 2004 Kevin Chun (a)
- 2003 Nick Flanagan (a)
- 2002 Adam Groom (a)
- 2001 Richard Swift (a)
- 2000 Andrew Webster (a)
- 1999 Brendan Jones (a)
- 1998 Geoff Ogilvy (a)
- 1997 Cameron Percy (a) (2)
- 1996 Cameron Percy (a)
- 1995 Lee Eagleton (a)
- 1994 Mathew Goggin (a)
- 1993 David Bransdon (a)

Year	Winner	Score	To par	Margin of victory	Runner(s)-up	Venue	Ref.
Tasmanian Open
1992	(Australia) Darren Cole	281	−3	2 strokes	(Australia) Taylor Murphy	Mowbray	
Tattersall's Tasmanian Open
1991	(Australia) Chris Gray	280	−8	2 strokes	(Australia) Jon Evans (Australia) Bradley Hughes (Australia) Robert Stephens	Royal Hobart	
1990: No tournament
1989	(Australia) Ian Stanley	279	−1	Playoff (Note: Stanley won at the first hole of a sudden-death playoff.)	(Australia) Peter O'Malley	Devonport	
Tasmanian Open
1988	(Australia) Brett Ogle	284	−4	1 stroke	(Australia) Brett Johns (a)	Tasmania	
Foster's Tattersall Tasmanian Open
1987	(Australia) Brian Jones	283	−5	1 stroke	(United States) Mike Colandro	Tasmania	
Foster's Tasmanian Open
1986	(Australia) Stewart Ginn (4)	281	−7	Playoff (Note: Ginn won at the second hole of a sudden-death playoff.)	(Sweden) Magnus Persson	Royal Hobart	
1985	(Australia) Ian Roberts	271	−17	2 strokes	(Australia) Ian Baker-Finch	Riverside	
Tasmanian Open
1984	(Australia) Mike Clayton	275	−13	2 strokes	(Australia) John Clifford (Australia) Wayne Grady	Kingston Beach	
1983	(Australia) Bob Shaw	271	−9	1 stroke	(Australia) Ian Stanley	Devonport	
Tattersall's Tasmanian Open
1982	(Australia) Colin Bishop	286	−2	1 stroke	(Australia) Mike Cahill (Australia) Rodger Davis (Australia) Stewart Ginn (Australia) Jack Newton	Tasmania	
1981	(Australia) Roger Stephens	276	−12	2 strokes	(Australia) Colin Bishop	Launceston	
1980	(Australia) Stewart Ginn (3)	280	−8	3 strokes	(Australia) Brian Jones	Royal Hobart	
1979	(United States) Marty Bohen	271	−9	4 strokes	(New Zealand) Terry Kendall	Devonport	
1978	(Australia) Max Robison (a)	287	−1	4 strokes	(Australia) Ian Stanley	Tasmania	
1977	(Australia) Bill Dunk (2)	272	−12	4 strokes	(Australia) Mike Cahill	Mowbray	
Tasmanian Open
1976	(Australia) David Good	283	−5	Playoff (Note: Good won at the fifth hole of a sudden-death playoff.)	(Australia) Stewart Ginn (Australia) Brian Jones (Australia) Ian Stanley	Royal Hobart	
1975	(Australia) Stewart Ginn (2)	272	−8	Playoff (Note: Ginn won at the first hole of a sudden-death playoff.)	(Australia) Ross Metherell	Devonport	
1974	(Australia) Bob Shearer	281	−7	Playoff	(Australia) Ted Ball	Tasmania	
1973	(Australia) Stewart Ginn	280	−4	2 strokes	(Australia) David Good (Australia) Ian Paul (Australia) Randall Vines	Claremont	
1972	(Australia) Bill Dunk	272	−8	5 strokes		Devonport	
1971	(Australia) Frank Phillips (2)	285	−3	3 strokes	(Australia) Tim Woolbank	Tasmania	
1970	(Australia) David Graham	282		1 stroke	(New Zealand) Terry Kendall	Kingston Beach	
1969	(Australia) Alan Murray (3)	280	−8	1 stroke	(Australia) Randall Vines	Riverside	
1968	(Australia) Randall Vines	274	−14	17 stroke	(New Zealand) Walter Godfrey	Royal Hobart	
1967	(Australia) Bob Stanton					Devonport	
1966	(Australia) Tim Woolbank					Claremont	
1965	(Australia) Alan Murray (2)	287		1 stroke	(Australia) Ted Ball	Launceston	
1964	(Australia) Ted Ball	269		9 strokes	(Australia) Peter Thomson	Kingston Beach	
1963	(Australia) Peter Mills	278		7 strokes	(Australia) Darrell Welch	Riverside	
1962	(Australia) Frank Phillips	279		Playoff (Note: Phillips won by forfeit.)	(Australia) Peter Thomson	Royal Hobart	
1961	(Australia) Alan Murray	281		4 strokes	(Australia) Darrell Welch	Launceston	
1960	(Australia) Des Turner (a)						
1959	(Australia) Peter Toogood (a) (8)						
1958	(Australia) Peter Toogood (a) (7)						
1957	(Australia) Peter Toogood (a) (6)						
1956	(Australia) Peter Toogood (a) (5)						
1955	(Australia) Peter Toogood (a) (4)						
1954	(Australia) Peter Toogood (a) (3)	283	−1	7 strokes	(Australia) Len Bowditch (a)	Royal Hobart	
1953	(Australia) Ron Smith (a)	298	+6	1 stroke	(Australia) Peter Brown (a) (Australia) Alf Toogood	Launceston	
1952	(Australia) Lance Baynton (a)	149		Playoff (Note: Baynton won a 6 hole playoff by 2 strokes.)	(Australia) Len Bowditch (a) (Australia) John Toogood (a)	Kingston Beach	
1951	(Australia) Peter Toogood (a) (2)	143		9 strokes	(Australia) Gerald Bailey	Launceston	
1950	(Australia) Alf Toogood (2)	142		3 strokes	(Australia) Peter Toogood (a)	Royal Hobart	
1949	(Australia) Peter Toogood (a)	143		Playoff (Note: Toogood won a 6 hole playoff by 2 strokes.)	(Australia) Ron Smith (a)	Launceston	
1948	(Australia) E. J. Willing (a)	148		2 strokes	(Australia) Peter Brown (a)	Kingston Beach	
1947	(Australia) Len Nettlefold (a) (8)	152		Playoff (Note: Nettlefold won a 6 hole playoff by 1 stroke.)	(Australia) Alf Toogood	Launceston	
1946	(Australia) Len Bowditch (a)	147		1 stroke	(Australia) Alf Toogood	Royal Hobart	
1940–1945: No tournament due to World War II
1939	(Australia) Denis Denehey	148		2 strokes	(Australia) Len Nettlefold (a)	Launceston	
1938	(Australia) Alf Toogood	148		3 strokes	(Australia) Denis Denehey	Kingston Beach	
1937	(Australia) Len Nettlefold (a) (7)	144		1 stroke	(Australia) Alf Toogood	Launceston	
1936	(Australia) Len Nettlefold (a) (6)	132		9 strokes	(England) C. G. Thynne (a)	Royal Hobart	
1935	(Australia) Len Nettlefold (a) (5)	147		4 strokes	(Australia) Bill Robertson	Launceston	
1934	(Australia) Len Nettlefold (a) (4)	145		2 strokes	(Australia) Jock Robertson	Kingston Beach	
1933	(Australia) Terence Brown (a)	152		1 stroke	(Australia) Ellis Davies (a) (Australia) J. Melrose (a)	Launceston	
1932	(Australia) Len Nettlefold (a) (3)	142		3 strokes	(Australia) Eustace Headlam	Royal Hobart	
1931	(Australia) Len Nettlefold (a) (2)	143		5 strokes	(Australia) Jock Robertson	Launceston	
1930	(Australia) Len Nettlefold (a)	148		1 stroke	(Australia) Jock Robertson	Kingston Beach	
1923–1929: No tournament
1922	(Australia) Robert Nettlefold (a)	154		1 stroke	(Australia) Eustace Headlam (a) (Australia) Len Nettlefold (a)	Hobart	
1921	(Australia) Thomas Archer Jr. (a)	157		1 stroke	(Australia) R O'Connor (a)	Launceston	
1920	(Australia) Hugh Smith (a)	157		3 strokes	(Australia) Felix Headlam (a)	Hobart	
1919	(Australia) Eustace Headlam (a) (2)	152		3 strokes	(Australia) Henry Allport (a)	Launceston	
1914–1918: No tournament due to World War I
1913	(Australia) Eustace Headlam (a)	152		7 strokes	(Australia) George Fawcett (a)	Launceston	
