= Nathan Holman =

Australian professional golfer (born 1991)

Personal information
- Nationality: Australia
- Born: 19 April 1991 (age 35)
- Height: 6 ft 0 in (1.83 m)
- Weight: 180 lb (82 kg; 13 st)

Career
- Sport: Golf
- Turned professional: 2013
- Current tour: PGA Tour of Australasia
- Former tours: European Tour; Asian Tour
- Professional wins: 1

Number of wins by tour
- European Tour: 1
- PGA Tour of Australasia: 1

Best results in major championships
- Masters Tournament: DNP
- PGA Championship: DNP
- U.S. Open: DNP
- The Open Championship: CUT: 2016

Achievements and awards
- PGA Tour of Australasia Order of Merit winner: 2015

Nathan Holman (born 19 April 1991) is an Australian professional golfer from Melbourne, Australia who plays on the PGA Tour of Australasia, the European Tour, and the Asian Tour. In December 2015, he won the Australian PGA Championship for his first professional victory.

== Amateur career ==
Holman had a successful amateur career and just prior to turning professional he was ranked number two in Australia and number 25 in the world. He played regularly as an amateur on the PGA Tour of Australasia in the last twelve months of his amateur career, including a top 20 finish in the Victorian PGA Championship. He also tied for fifth at the Heritage Classic and tied for second in the Victorian Open.

== Professional career ==
Holman turned professional in October 2013, and his first professional tournament was the Western Australia Goldfields PGA Championship at Kalgoorlie Golf Course from 3–6 October 2013.

In only his fifth professional tournament, in November 2013, Holman made the cut at the 2013 Talisker Masters played at the Royal Melbourne Golf Club and significantly, was tied for the lead at the half-way mark. He went into the final round tied for second, having played the third round with Adam Scott, a player Holman has described as an idol. Although Holman faded in the final round with a 78, he did shoot three sub-par rounds to finish on -3 and 15th place in a tournament field of 120 competitors. He finished 13th on the PGA Tour of Australasia Order of Merit, having finished in the top 25 in six of the seven tournaments he played as a professional.

Holman earned his Asian Tour card for 2014 through Q School and placed 52nd on the Order of Merit, with his best finish a tie for second at the ICTSI Philippine Open. In addition to finishing 34th on the PGA Tour of Australasia Order of Merit, he also played four European Tour events in 2014 and finished 201st in the Race to Dubai as an affiliate member.

Through his Asian Tour membership, Holman earned entry into most of the events co-sanctioned by the Asian and European Tours in 2015, and received invitations to several other European Tour events. In all, he played ten European Tour events in 2015 and finished 135th on the Race to Dubai as an affiliate member. This earned him conditional status on the 2016 European Tour and entry into the final stage of Q School, where he was unable to earn a full card.

In December 2015, Holman earned the first professional win of his career, the Australian PGA Championship, with a par on the first hole of a playoff with Harold Varner III of the United States and Dylan Frittelli of South Africa. The win at a tournament co-sanctioned by the European Tour earned Holman the top spot on the final 2015 PGA Tour of Australasia Order of Merit as well as spots in the 2016 Open Championship at Royal Troon and the 2016 WGC-Bridgestone Invitational. The win also secured Holman's card on the 2016 European Tour just two weeks after he had failed in his bid to secure a spot on that tour via the qualifying school.

== Amateur wins ==
- 2011 Riversdale Cup, Portsea Open, Victorian Amateur Championship, Southern Open
- 2012 Master of the Amateurs, Mandurah Open Amateur

== Professional wins (1) ==
=== European Tour wins (1) ===
No.	Date	Tournament	Winning score	Margin of victory	Runners-up
1	6 Dec 2015 (2016 season)	Australian PGA Championship^{1}	E (77-68-70-73=288)	Playoff	(South Africa) Dylan Frittelli, (United States) Harold Varner III

^{1}Co-sanctioned with the PGA Tour of Australasia

European Tour playoff record (1–0)

No.	Year	Tournament	Opponents	Result
1	2015	Australian PGA Championship	(South Africa) Dylan Frittelli, (United States) Harold Varner III	Won with par on first extra hole

=== PGA Tour of Australasia wins (1) ===
No.	Date	Tournament	Winning score	Margin of victory	Runners-up
1	6 Dec 2015	Australian PGA Championship^{1}	E (77-68-70-73=288)	Playoff	(South Africa) Dylan Frittelli, (United States) Harold Varner III

^{1}Co-sanctioned with the European Tour

PGA Tour of Australasia playoff record (1–0)

No.	Year	Tournament	Opponents	Result
1	2015	Australian PGA Championship	(South Africa) Dylan Frittelli, (United States) Harold Varner III	Won with par on first extra hole

== Results in major championships ==
Tournament	2016
Masters Tournament	
U.S. Open	
The Open Championship	CUT
PGA Championship	

Did not play

CUT = missed the halfway cut

== Results in World Golf Championships ==
Tournament	2016
Championship	56
Match Play	
Invitational	T46
Champions	T77

Did not play

"T" = tied

== Team appearances ==
Amateur

- Sloan Morpeth Trophy (representing Australia): 2012
- Australian Men's Interstate Teams Matches (representing Victoria): 2010, 2011, 2012, 2013
