= Basil Henriques =

British Jewish philanthropist

- Born: October 17, 1890
- Died: December 2, 1961 (aged 71)
- Occupation: Philanthropist
- Spouse: Rose Loewe (married 1916)

Sir Basil Lucas Quixano Henriques CBE JP (17 October 1890 – 2 December 1961) was a British philanthropist of Portuguese Jewish origins, concentrating his work in the East End of London during the first half of the 20th century.

== Education ==
From a prominent Sephardic Jewish family, Henriques was educated at Lockers Park School in Hertfordshire and Harrow. He studied Modern History at University College, Oxford, and graduated with a third class honours in 1913.

== First World War ==
Henriques served in the Tank Corps during World War I, taking part in the Battle of Flers where his tank, C22, was ordered to clear the Quadrilateral to the north east of Ginchy. During this operation his tank mistakenly engaged soldiers from The Norfolk Regiment, resulting in several fatalities.

== Professional life ==
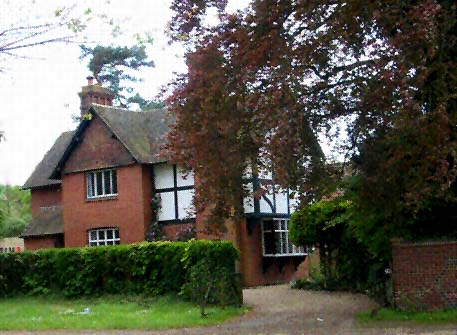
Henriques’ house at Southcote, where Jewish children had recuperative holidays.

In addition to writing reforms to religious Jewish ceremonies, Henriques set up boys' clubs for deprived Jewish children. In 1914, Henriques founded the Oxford and St George's Club; this later developed into the Bernhard Baron St George's Jewish Settlement. The boys received education, vocational training, recreation and holidays in the country.

From 1923 until 1950, he would frequently send deprived, sick or merely tired children to his country home, Southcote Cottage, at Southcote, Linslade in Buckinghamshire for rest and recuperation. The cottage, in reality a large house, was loaned to him by his friend and fellow Jew Anthony Gustav de Rothschild, Southcourt being part of Rothschild’s Ascott Estate.

In 1923 Sir Basil became a magistrate, and was named a Commander of the Order of the British Empire (CBE) in the 1948 Birthday Honours. He was knighted in 1955. He served as chairman of the East London Juvenile Court for 19 years, and served as a magistrate for 32 years. He retired from the Bench in 1956.

Sir Basil was a founding member of the Homosexual Legal Reform Society, which sought to overturn the law banning sexual acts between consenting adults.

== Legacy ==
The former Berner Street in Whitechapel was renamed Henriques Street in his honour.

== Controversies ==
=== NSPCC ===
During his time as a magistrate, Henriques criticised the work of the NSPCC on a number occasions. As part of his 1950 book The Indiscretions of a Magistrate, Henriques argued that legal supervision by a probation officer was more effective than voluntary supervision by an officer of the NSPCC.

=== Working mothers ===
In 1950, during the annual conference of the Magistrates' Association, Henriques spoke in favour of a motion which condemned 'women who go out to work and prefer the privileges of marriage to its responsibilities'. Henriques argued that

Women seem to think themselves rivals and equals to men in all things, but they are only superior in some things such as washing the baby and washing up. The proper place for the mother is in her home, and there is no greater cause of juvenile delinquency than when the relationship between mother and child has been cast away.

The motion was eventually defeated by 145 votes to 126.

== Written work ==
Basil Henriques was the author of several books, mostly concerned with the care of youth, including:

- (1933) Club Leadership.
- (1937) The Indiscretions of a Warden.
- (1945) What is Judaism.
- (1950) The Indiscretions of a Magistrate.
- (1951) Fratres: Club Boys in Uniform, an Anthology.
- (1955) The Home-menders: the Prevention of Unhappiness in Children.

In his role as a children's court magistrate, he also wrote the foreword to the Enid Blyton novel, The Six Bad Boys (1951), which relates the bad consequences of family breakdown for six boys, culminating in their appearing in a children's court for theft. Henriques, in his foreword, praises Blyton for her treatment of this subject, and stresses the negative effects of broken homes on children – one of the major themes of this novel.

== Personal life ==
Henriques married Rose Loewe in 1916, and they worked together throughout their marriage. His sister was married to the well known angler Reginald Beddington, and their son was the artist and writer Roy Beddington.

== Death ==
Henriques died on 2 December 1961, aged 71. In 1966, Rose, Lady Henriques published a biography of her husband, entitled Years in Stepney.

== See also ==
- Henriques family
