= Boddington =

Boddington may refer to:

== People ==
- Boddington (surname)

== Places ==
- Boddington, Gloucestershire, England
  - RAF Boddington was nearby
- Boddington, Northamptonshire, England
- Boddington, Western Australia, town near Perth, Western Australia
- Shire of Boddington, local government area in Western Australia

== See also ==
- Boddingtons, brewery brand
