= Craig Scott (golfer) =

Australian professional golfer (born 1983)

Personal information
- Nationality: Australia
- Born: 24 March 1983 (age 43) Mildura, Australia
- Height: 1.85 m (6 ft 1 in)
- Weight: 85 kg (187 lb)

Career
- Sport: Golf
- Turned professional: 2004
- Current tour: PGA Tour of Australasia
- Former tour: Canadian Tour

Craig Scott (born 24 March 1983 in Mildura, Victoria) is an Australian professional golfer.

== Golf career ==
Scott won the 2002 Victorian Amateur Championship before turning professional in 2004.

== Team appearances ==
Amateur

- Australian Men's Interstate Teams Matches (representing Victoria): 2001, 2003 (winners)
