= Rose Henriques =

British artist (1889-1972)

Lady Henriques
- Born: Rose Louise Loewe; 17 August 1889; Stoke Newington, London
- Died: 1972 (aged 82–83)
- Known for: Painting, social work
- Spouse: Sir Basil Henriques

Rose Louise Henriques, Lady Henriques CBE (née Loewe; 17 August 1889 – 1972) was a British artist and social and charity worker in the East End of London, where she was born and lived throughout her life. She was posthumously recognised as a British Hero of the Holocaust.

== Biography ==
Henriques was born in Stoke Newington to Orthodox Jewish parents. Her father, James Henry Loewe, was a bankers' agent, community worker and scholar from Brighton while her mother, Emma née Immerwahr, had emigrated to London from Beuthen (Bytom) in Upper Silesia. At the age of 16, Rose was sent to stay with relations in Breslau, now Wrocław, where she trained as a pianist and learned to speak German. After her marriage to Basil Henriques in 1917 she decided to concentrate on social work. The couple worked on a number of joint enterprises together. From 1914 until 1948, they were the joint wardens of the St George's Jewish Settlement in Stepney, later known as the Bernhard Baron St George's Jewish Settlement. The settlement housed a number of social and educational clubs.

During World War I, Rose Henriques worked as a nurse at Liverpool Street station and in World War II, she served as an air-raid warden and also organized an emergency feeding scheme for people whose homes had been destroyed in the Blitz. During the Blitz, she completed a large number of drawings and paintings of events in the East End, many of which are now held by the Museum of London. At the start of World War II, she applied to work for the War Artists' Advisory Committee, but it was only later in the conflict that the Committee purchased one of her watercolours, Shelter Entrance from 1941. When the war ended, she went to Germany where she worked alongside a number of Jewish welfare groups at the former Bergen-Belsen concentration camp and then at the nearby displaced persons camp.

Upon returning to England, Henriques was the chair of the British Ose Society for promoting mental and physical health and established Workrooms for the Elderly in east London. In the East End she promoted local musicians and artists and continued to paint London street scenes, largely concentrating on events in Aldgate, Whitechapel and Spitalfields and the local Jewish community. In 1947, the Whitechapel Art Gallery hosted an exhibition of her work, Stepney in War & Peace, while a further hundred of her works were shown at the same venue as Vanishing Stepney in 1961.

In 1955, Basil Henriques was knighted and his wife became known as Lady Henriques. The local council renamed the street where the St George's Jewish Settlement was located as Henriques Street in honour of the couple. Henriques published her autobiography, Fifty Years in Stepney in 1966. In 1964, Rose Henriques received the Henrietta Szold Award for services to the Jewish community and in 1971 was awarded the CBE for "services to the community in East London". A large retrospective of her paintings was held in 2013 in Tower Hamlets. In May 2019, the British Government honoured Henriques with the British Hero of the Holocaust award.
