= Cobra Golf =

American sports equipment manufacturer

- Type: Subsidiary
- Industry: Sports equipment
- Founded: 1973; 53 years ago
- Founder: Thomas L. Crow
- Headquarters: Carlsbad, California, US
- Key people: Bob Philion, president
- Products: Golf clubs
- Brands: King
- Parent: Puma
- Website: cobragolf.com

Cobra Golf is a sports equipment manufacturing company based in Carlsbad, California, focused on golf equipment, producing a wide range of golf clubs. The company is currently a subsidiary of Puma. Cobra was founded in 1973 by Thomas L. Crow.

== History ==
=== Origin ===
The company was founded in 1973 by Thomas L. Crow, winner of the 1961 Australian amateur golf championship. He was inspired by the notion that golfers in the United States typically bought clubs at a whim, with the hopes that they may make their game better. Cobra produced one of the first utility clubs, the "Baffler" –introduced in 1980– long before the use of such clubs became popular. Cobra was dedicated to the average golfer, especially ladies and seniors which makes it understandable that is also the first U.S. club manufacturer to sell stock graphite-shafted woods and irons that are known for being lighter clubs. In five years, Cobra Golf was selling about $4.5 million worth of these clubs annually.

In 1994 King Cobra oversized irons became the best selling irons in golf, making Cobra synonymous with oversized irons. The company was acquired in 1996 by American Brands Inc. (later known as Fortune Brands) and was grouped together under the Acushnet Company umbrella. In 2010, Cobra was acquired by Puma SE.

In 1999 Cobra introduced Dista golf balls intended to maximize distance for all players with multiple swing speed models offered.

=== Marketing ===
Between 1989 and 1993, the company grew from $20 million to $56 million in annual sales thanks to aggressive marketing that included endorsements with leading players such as Hale Irwin, Beth Daniel and Greg Norman. Cobra's relationship with former world number one Norman lasted for many years. Other leading professionals to have endorsement deals with Cobra include Rickie Fowler, Lexi Thompson, Max Homa, Gary Woodland and Justin Suh.

In February 2014, Cobra Golf signed a multi-year partnership with the PGA Tour's Honda Classic, making it one of the lead sponsors of the event. In 2016 Cobra Golf partnered with Flying Tee, a golf driving range and simulation venue, to provide the official equipment and apparel.

== Products ==
Cobra markets a full range of golf clubs including; drivers, fairways, hybrids, irons, wedges, utility irons, etc.
