= Beddington (disambiguation) =

Beddington or Bedington can refer to:

== Places ==
- Beddington, a place between Sutton and Croydon (boroughs of London, England)
- Beddington Aerodrome, created to protect London against First World War Zeppelin attacks
- Beddington, Maine, United States, a town
- Bedington, West Virginia, United States, an unincorporated hamlet
- Beddington Lake, Maine

== People ==
- Beddington (surname)

== See also ==
- Municipal Borough of Beddington and Wallington, a municipal borough in Surrey, England
- Beddington Heights, Calgary, a neighbourhood in Calgary, Alberta, Canada
