= Arnold Henry Mason =

British portrait painter

Arnold Henry Mason RA (20 March 1885 - 17 November 1963) was a British portrait painter of the twentieth century.

== Early life and education ==
Mason was born at Birkenhead, Cheshire, United Kingdom. He studied at the Macclesfield School of Art, the Royal College of Art, London and the Slade School, London in 1918–19.

== Career ==
Mason worked in Paris and Rome. In 1906 he was Assistant to Sir William Richmond on the internal decorations of the Old Bailey Courtrooms, London. He served in the Artists' Rifles 1915–18, and exhibited at the Royal Academy, London, from 1919. In the 1930s he had a studio in Chelsea. He befriended the artist Roy Beddington and assisted him in getting his career established in London.

In 1940, Mason became an Associate of the Royal Academy; he was accepted as a Royal Academician in 1951 and a senior member of the R.A. in 1960.

Mason died aged 78 on 17 November 1963 in Kensington, London.

== Works ==
Although sometimes described as a landscape and portrait painter, he is best known as a portrait painter in oils and pencil portraits on paper. His works can be seen in the Tate, the National Portrait Gallery and the Royal Academy Galleries in London, and the National Library of Australia. Most of his finished portraits are signed, often with "Arnold Mason" followed by the last two digits of the year date. Most of his works date from 1910 to 1962.

One of his most notable oil paintings on canvas is to be seen at the National Portrait Gallery in London. Titled Elinor Glyn it was painted by 1942, and purchased in 1962. Other paintings are to be found in the collections of the Derby Museum the Norfolk County Museums, the University of Melbourne, Australia and the Dudmaston Museum in Shropshire.
