= Victorian Close Championship =

Golf tournament

Tournament information
- Established: 1948
- Format: Stroke play
- Final year: c. 1978

The Victorian Close Championship was an annual golf tournament held in Victoria, Australia. It was founded in 1948. It was superseded by the Victorian Open which was first held in 1957, but was reintroduced the following year and continued until about 1978.

== History ==
A 36-hole close championship was planned for 1939 but was cancelled because of the war. The Victorian Golf Association revived the idea in 1947 as a 36-hole "open scratch event", open to amateurs and professionals resident in Victoria, played on a single day at Victoria Golf Club. Professional George Naismith and amateur Bill Higgins tied with scores of 149.

The first Close Championship was played at Huntingdale in 1948 and was won by Ossie Pickworth who finished 12 strokes ahead of the field. Pickworth won again in 1950, 1954 and 1955, each time by large margins. 19-year-old Peter Thomson won in 1949 and he won again in 1951, each time by 8 strokes. Jack Harris won in 1952 while Tom Crow was the first amateur winner in 1953.

The Victorian Open started in 1957, replacing the Close championship. However the Close Championship was reintroduced in 1958, with the event to be played outside Melbourne. The 1958 event was played over 72 holes but from 1959 it became a 54-hole event. Bruce Devlin, still an amateur, won in 1959. The tournament existed through the 1970s. In 1976, Mike Cahill, who recently turned professional, won the event. The championship was finally dropped in 1978.

== Winners ==
Year	Winner	Score	To par	Margin of victory	Runner(s)-up	Venue	Ref.
1948	(Australia) Ossie Pickworth	293		12 strokes	(Australia) Doug Bachli (a)	Huntingdale	
1949	(Australia) Peter Thomson	293		8 strokes	(Australia) Jack Harris	Yarra Yarra	
1950	(Australia) Ossie Pickworth (2)	291		6 strokes	(Australia) Laurie Duffy (a)	Metropolitan	
1951	(Australia) Peter Thomson (2)	288		8 strokes	(Australia) Ossie Pickworth	Commonwealth	
1952	(Australia) Jack Harris	294		6 strokes	(Australia) Bert Clay	Woodlands	
1953	(Australia) Tom Crow (a)	296		1 strokes	(Australia) Doug Bachli (a) (Australia) Bill Higgins (a)	Kew	
1954	(Australia) Ossie Pickworth (3)	289		14 strokes	(Australia) Jack Harris (Australia) Eric Routley (a)	Huntingdale	
1955	(Australia) Ossie Pickworth (4)	287		14 strokes	(Australia) Denis Denehey	Kingswood	
1956–1957: No tournament
1958	(Australia) Bob Brown	294		Playoff (Note: Brown won the 18-hole playoff with a round of 70 to West's 71)	(Australia) Barry West	Geelong	
1959	(Australia) Bruce Devlin (a)	213	−3	2 strokes	(Australia) Doug Bachli (a)	Geelong	
1960	(Australia) Neil Tetheridge (a)	200	−7	3 strokes	(Australia) Jack Harris	Midlands	
1961	(Australia) Jack Harris (2)	199		6 strokes	(Australia) Dick O'Shea (a)	Midlands	
1962	(Australia) Jack Harris (3)	212		3 strokes	(Australia) Alan Heil	Traralgon	
1963	(Australia) Alan Heil	222		1 stroke	(Australia) Bob Brown (Australia) Peter Mills (Australia) Don Moir (a)	Shepparton	
1964	(Australia) Brian Simpson	217		2 strokes	(Australia) Bryan Smith	Shepparton	
1965	(Australia) Alan Heil (2)	218		Playoff (Note: Heil won a three hole playoff)	(Australia) Bob Brown	Sale	
1966	(Australia) Peter Mills	213		2 strokes	(Australia) John Davis	Horsham	

This list in incomplete
