= Myles Boddington =

English cricketer, racehorse breeder, and president of the English Golf Union

Personal information
- Full name: Myles Alan Boddington
- Born: 30 November 1924; Hale, Cheshire, England
- Died: 14 February 2002 (aged 77); Burford, Oxfordshire, England
- Batting: Left-handed
- Bowling: Right-arm fast-medium
- Relatives: Robert Boddington (father)

Career statistics
Competition	First-class
Matches	1
Runs scored	23
Batting average	11.50
100s/50s	–/–
Top score	23
Balls bowled	18
Wickets	0
Bowling average	–
5 wickets in innings	–
10 wickets in match	–
Best bowling	–
Catches/stumpings	1/–
- Source: Cricinfo, 19 March 2019

Myles Alan Boddington (30 November 1924 – 14 February 2002) was an English first-class cricketer, noted racehorse breeder and president of the English Golf Union.

The son of the first-class cricketer Robert Boddington and his wife Constance Mary Cornall, he was born at Hale, Cheshire. He was educated at Rugby School, where he played cricket for the school cricket team and was regarded as a "a fast bowler of height and hostility". He played for the school in their centenary match in 1941 against the Marylebone Cricket Club (MCC), marking a hundred years since the MCC played a Rugby School side captained by Thomas Hughes. After leaving Rugby School, Boddington briefly served in the Royal Air Force, during which he played for the Royal Air Force cricket team in a first-class cricket match against Worcestershire at Worcester in 1946. Batting twice in the match, he was dismissed without scoring in the Royal Air Force first-innings, while in their second-innings he was dismissed for 23 runs by Peter Jackson. Despite interest in this match surrounding his bowling, he was only able to bowl three overs before pulling up injured.

Three years later, he married Joan Dorothy Johnson, with the couple having three children. He later moved to Burford in Oxfordshire, where he owned a farm on which he bred pigs and race horses. He was an amateur golfer of some repute. He held several administrative positions, including as president of the English Golf Union. He owned several racehorses that took part in National Hunt racing. He died at Burford in February 2002.
