= George Boddington =

Australian rugby league player

Playing information
Club
Years	Team	Pld	T	G	FG	P
1922–1928	Eastern Suburbs

Coaching information
Club
Years	Team	Gms	W	D	L	W%
1929	Eastern Suburbs	13	3	1	9	23

George Boddington was an Australian former rugby league player and coach. He was one of the early coaches of the Eastern Suburbs (now known as the Sydney Roosters). He coached the team in the 1929 NSWRFL season. He was Easts #133 representative, debuting in 1922.
