= Roy Beddington =

British painter (1910–1995)

- Born: 16 June 1910; Paddington, London, England
- Died: 31 May 1995 (aged 84); Salisbury, England
- Occupations: Painter, illustrator, writer

Roy Beddington (16 June 1910 – 31 May 1995) was a British painter, illustrator, fisherman, poet, writer on fishing, and journalist. As an artist he was known for his watercolours, with his first one-man shows being at Grafton and Walker's galleries in London in the 1930s. He continued to exhibit in shows for decades, with his last show exhibiting just shortly before he died in 1995 at 84 years old. In the mid 1930s he illustrated three books for Irish author Stephen Gwynn, mostly with a fishing theme. His work was part of the painting event in the art competition at the 1948 Summer Olympics.

As an author, Beddington published a novel, a children's book, a biographical book on a yellow Labrador, two volumes of poetry, and a book on fishing. He also worked for many years as a journalist for Country Life; notably penning a regular column on fishing while occasionally contributing stories on other topics to the magazine. His column and other stories often included his art work in addition to his writing.

== Early life and education ==
Born into a prominent Jewish family in Paddington, London, Beddington was the son of Reginald Beddington; a well known fisherman in the United Kingdom who served terms as President of both the Freshwater Biological Association and National Association of Fishery Boards. His mother was the sister of the British philanthropist Basil Henriques, and herself a talented angler who at one time was a record holder for the catching of salmon. He attended Lockers Park School in Hertfordshire before moving onto Rugby School where he experienced antisemitism from some of the staff and students; often being teased about the family's historically Jewish surname, Moses, which had been altered generations earlier to avoid persecution. While there, he found solace in his art and spent considerable amounts of his time in the art room. The British philosopher and historian and fellow Jew Isaiah Berlin later befriended Beddington when they were both students at Corpus Christi College, Oxford, and he wrote the following about Beddington's experience at Rugby:

There was perhaps not a very nice teacher at Rugby where Roy Beddington was, who used to say to the boys, 'And the Lord said unto Moses, good morning, Mister Beddington.' I felt very sorry for Roy Beddington, but I never thought something like that could happen to me.

Beddington's father wanted his son to become an accountant; having secured him a place in that capacity with the Mazawattee Tea Company. However, at Corpus Christi College he studied law and he pursued private studies in art with Bernard Adams. After graduating with a degree in law, he matriculated to the Slade School of Fine Art where he was a pupil of Randolph Schwabe and Karl Hagedorn.

== Career ==
Beddington began his career as an artist in London in the 1930s; initially aided by his former teacher Bernard Adams and Arnold Henry Mason, a Chelsea-based painter. The two men helped Beddington build connections with the artist community in that city; with initial presentations of his art in group shows. He met the publisher Noel Carrington, who had a profound impact on his career. Carrington was a publisher with Country Life who was in charge of the book publishing division of that organization. Drawn to Beddington's watercolours, he approached the artist about working for Country Life as an illustrator. He also assisted Beddington in other projects; including setting him up with his first one-man art shows at the London galleries of Ackermann, Grafton, and Walker. Beddington continued to exhibit his watercolours in shows for the next six decades, with his last show being in 1995 when he was 84 years old. He notably competed in the painting event of the art competition at the 1948 Summer Olympics. Many of his watercolours reflect his interest in fishing, and he once wrote:

The trouble is, one always wants to fish when one is painting and paint when one is fishing ... When one is fishing down a pool, the light suddenly changes and a perfect picture reveals itself. At such a moment I have to make up my mind whether to go on fishing or to take up my paints.

In the mid 1930s Beddington illustrated three books with Irish author Stephen Gwynn: The Happy Fisherman (1936), From River to River (1937), and Two in a Valley (1938). All of these books had connections to fish and fishing, and it was Noel Carrington who had brought Beddington and Gwynn together as a team. In a review in The Guardian of the latter work, critic Gilbert Thomas wrote:

'Two in a Valley'—a handsome quarto—is the sketch-book of a successfully 'atmospheric' artist in black and white. Mr. Gwynn's accompanying letterpress, setting down the impressions of a comparative stranger in the Coln Valley, is slight, and sometimes, quite irrelevantly, he follows a red herring—or more precisely a trout! But even when most discursive he is good company ... He brings both freshness and penetration of observation to the Cotswold scene, where as much as anywhere on our island, the works of Nature and man are one.

In addition to his work with Gwynn, Beddington also illustrated Anthony Crossley's The Floating Line for Salmon and Sea Trout (1939). At this point, he began to branch out into writing as well as painting after being encouraged by Gwynn to pursue writing as a career. He began working for Country Life as a columnist and wrote and illustrated the children's book The Adventures of Thomas Trout (1939). In 1955 he published To Be a Fisherman; a work about the experiences of being an angler. In 1957 his children's novel, The Pigeon and the Boy, was published by Geoffrey Bles. The work tells the story of a boy from a small English village who is taught how to train racing pigeons by his father. He grows up and becomes a young soldier in the British Army in France during World War II. He uses his talent with pigeons from his childhood to aid in the war against the Nazis; ultimately using his own pigeon to send a critical message across the English Channel. His third and final book, Pindar: a dog to remember (1975), was described by James Fergusson in The Independent as "a remarkably unselfconscious biography of a yellow labrador". He also published two volumes of poetry.

== Personal life and death ==
Beddington served in the British Army during World War II, specializing in anti-aircraft work. He was discharged after being injured, after which he worked for the Ministry of Agriculture and Fisheries. He was involved with national policy making with Britain's Salmon & Trout Association and was a chairman of the Fisheries Committee's Hampshire River Board. In 1952 he married Anna Griffith with whom he had two daughters. The couple divorced after seven years of marriage, and he married a second time in 1961 to Diana Dobson with whom he had another daughter.

Beddington died on 31 May 1995 at the age of 84 in Salisbury, Wiltshire.
