= P. C. Anderson =

Amateur golfer and educationist

P.C. Anderson
Personal information
- Full name: Peter Corsar Anderson
- Nationality: Scotland
- Born: 17 February 1871 Menmuir, Forfarshire, Scotland
- Died: 26 August 1955 (aged 84)
- Life partner: Agnes Henrietta Macartney
- Children: 13

Career
- Sport: Golf
- College: Madras
- Status: Amateur

Best results in major championships (wins: 1)
- U.S. Open: DNP
- The Open Championship: T19: 1893
- U.S. Amateur: DNP
- British Amateur: Won: 1893

Peter Corsar Anderson CBE (17 February 1871 – 26 August 1955) was an educator and golfer in Western Australia.

== Tournament wins ==
this list is incomplete

- 1893 The Amateur Championship
- 1898 Surrey Hills Gentlemen's Championship
- 1899 Surrey Hills Gentlemen's Championship
- 1902 Surrey Hills Gentlemen's Championship

== Major championships ==
=== Amateur wins (1) ===
Year	Championship	Winning score	Runner-up
1893	The Amateur Championship	1 up	(Scotland) Johnny Laidlay

=== Results timeline ===
Note: Anderson played in only The Open Championship and The Amateur Championship.

Tournament	1891	1892	1893	1894
The Open Championship	CUT		T19	
The Amateur Championship			1	R32

Win
Did not play

CUT = Missed the cut
"T" indicates a tie for a place
DNQ = Did not qualify for match play portion

Source for British Open: www.opengolf.com
Source for 1894 British Amateur: The Glasgow Herald, April 26, 1894, p. 11.
