= Ivo Whitton =

Australian golfer (1893–1967)

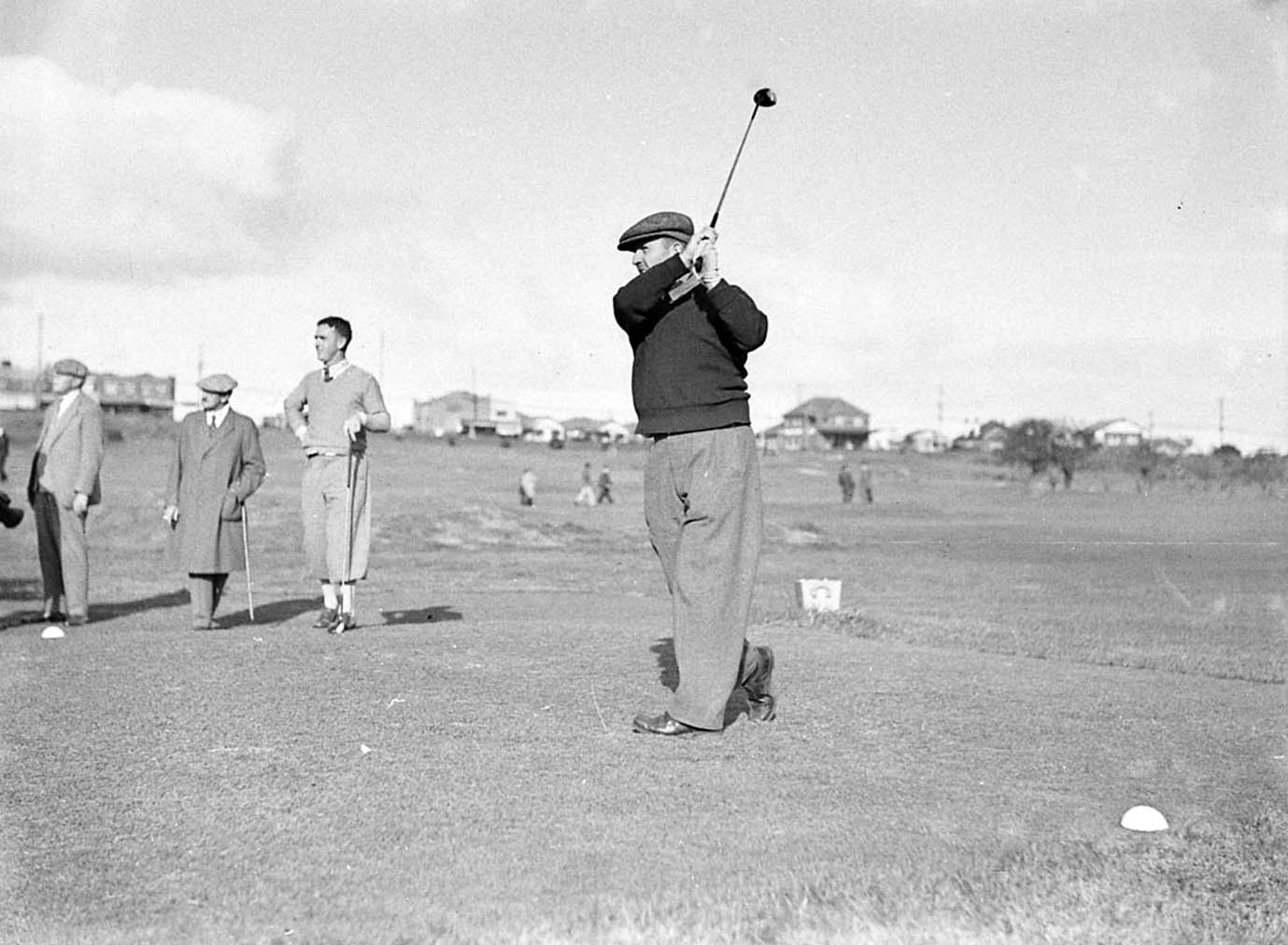
- Whitton at the Australian Golf Club in Rosebery, NSW (ca. 1935–36)

Personal information
- Full name: Ivo Harrington Whitton
- Nationality: Australia
- Born: 9 December 1893 Moonee Ponds, Victoria
- Died: 2 July 1967 (aged 73) Sandringham, Victoria, Australia

Career
- Sport: Golf
- Status: Amateur

Achievements and awards
- Helms Award: 1920

Ivo Harrington Whitton (9 December 1893 – 2 July 1967) was an Australian amateur golfer, who, along with Greg Norman, is the only Australian to have won the Australian Open five times (1912, 1913, 1926, 1929 and 1931).

== Early life ==
Whitton was born in Moonee Ponds, Victoria, his father Percy Whitton was a senior public servant.

The younger Whitton took up golfing at the age of 14, joining his father in the Caulfield Golf Club (later the Metropolitan Golf Club) the next year, and winning the club championships three times. In 1911, he began working at a wool broking firm which allowed him time off to play golf during the off-season. In 1914, he competed at The Amateur Championship at Royal St George's Golf Club. He returned to Australia but then came back to England during World War I to serve with the Royal Garrison Artillery after being rejected by the Australian Imperial Force.

== Golf career ==
In 1912, Whitton won his first Australian Open championship, and went on to win four more in 1913, 1926, 1929 and 1931. He also won the Australian Amateur twice, the Victorian Amateur Championship five times, the New South Wales Amateur and the Queensland Amateur and Open.

In 1920, Whitton won the Helms Award as the most outstanding Australasian athlete. He returned to the wool industry as a wool appraiser for the Australian government, but ended up as a general manager for the Spalding sporting goods company.

The Victorian Golf Association established the Ivo Whitton Trophy in 1960 for the lowest average stroke score in designated tournaments held each year. Whitton himself presented the award to the inaugural winner, Kevin Hartley, who went on to win it a further eleven times. In addition, the Royal Melbourne Golf Club instituted the Ivo Whitton Cup in Whitton's memory. One of the streets in Kambah, a suburb of Canberra, is named Ivo Whitton Circuit.

== Death and legacy ==
After his death, Whitton was buried in the Cheltenham Memorial Park, Melbourne.

A group of local Melbourne golfers regularly play-off in a 9-hole stroke play event for the Ivo Whitton Perpetual Trophy at Burnley Golf Course to honour his memory.

== Tournament wins ==
- 1912 Australian Open, Riversdale Trophy
- 1913 Australian Open, Riversdale Trophy
- 1919 Victorian Amateur
- 1920 Victorian Amateur
- 1922 Australian Amateur, Victorian Amateur
- 1923 Australian Amateur, Victorian Amateur, Queensland Amateur
- 1924 Victorian Amateur
- 1925 Riversdale Trophy
- 1926 Australian Open, Riversdale Trophy
- 1928 Queensland Open
- 1929 Australian Open, New South Wales Amateur
- 1931 Australian Open

== Team appearances ==
- Kirk-Windeyer Cup (representing Victoria): 1927
- Australian Men's Interstate Teams Matches (representing Victoria): 1912 (winners), 1913 (winners), 1920, 1921 (winners), 1922, 1923 (winners), 1924 (winners), 1926 (winners), 1927 (winners), 1929 (winners), 1930 (winners), 1931 (winners), 1932, 1933 (winners), 1935, 1938
