= Sarah Beddington =

British artist and filmmaker

Sarah Beddington (born 1964) is a British artist and filmmaker based in London.

== Work ==
Beddington was born in Winchester and studied at the City and Guilds of London Art School and at Central St Martins College. Beddington's work investigates the intersection between the historical and the contemporary, often in relation to journeys and migration. Beddington is interested in traces in the landscape, the power of the collective voice and walking as a means of affirming presence. Her works in film and video, as well as in fragile or ephemeral media such as etched glass and silverpoint drawing, present a minutely scrutinised sense of place that offer a poetic reading of the overlap between the historical, the mythical and the everyday, potentially opening up a space to future scenarios.

Beddington's work has been shown in many museums, galleries and film festivals including: City States, Liverpool Biennale; Les Rencontres Internationales, Centre Pompidou, Paris and Reina Sofia Museum, Madrid; Eastern Standards: Western Artists in China, MASS MoCA, USA; FIDMarseille International Film Festival; LOOP film and video festival, Angels Gallery, Barcelona; Vanishing Point, Wexner Center for the Arts, Columbus, Ohio. She has recently been shortlisted for the Artangel Open Commission and the Paul Hamlyn Foundation award in the UK and received a Bloomberg LP special commission in 2008. She had a research residency in 2014 at the Henry Moore Institute in Leeds and previous artistic residencies include International Studio and Curatorial Program (ISCP, 2002–2003) and Cité des Arts in Paris (2009–2010).

== Exhibitions ==
=== Solo exhibitions ===
- 2014 "From here to there and on beyond. . ." permanent installation in lobby of new school, New York
- 2008 Places of Laughter and of Crying, curated by Sacha Craddock and Graham Gussin, Bloomberg SPACE, London

Crossing, curated by Tania Duvergne, Dumbo Arts Center (DAC), New York

- 2005–2006 Panoptiscope, curated by James Putnam, Petrie Museum, University College London
- 2005 Parallel Lines and Other Stories, curated by Alena Williams, Bootlab, Berlin
- 2004 Momenta Art, New York
- 2003 where would you rather be..., FLAT, ArtBasel, Paradeisos Center, Miami
- 2003 Double Trouble, curated by Felicity Hogan, FLAT, New York
- 2001 Forty Nights, Hales Gallery, London
- 1999 Galleri Wallner, Malmö, Sweden
- 1999 Sarah Beddington, Hales Gallery, London

=== Selected group exhibitions and film screenings ===
- 2016 Secret Agent, Guest Projects, London
- 2015 FIDMarseille International Film Festival
- 2013 Jericho: beyond the celestial and terrestrial, Birzeit University Museum, Birzeit, West Bank of Palestine
- 2012 the near and the elsewhere, PM Gallery, London

Sheffield Fringe, Sheffield Documentary Film Festival

- 2011 Les Rencontres Internationales, Centre Pompidou, Paris and Haus de Kulturen de Welt, Berlin

FIDLab, FIDMarseille, Marseille

- 2010 City States, Liverpool Biennale

A travers un cercle de regards, Cité internationale des arts in Paris

- 2009 Les Rencontres Internationales, Reina Sofia Museum, Madrid

The Other Shadow of the City, al Hoash Gallery, Jerusalem
Sarah Beddington, General Public, Berlin
RIWAQ Biennale, Ramallah, West Bank
Eastern Standards: Western Artists in China, curated by Susan Cross, MASS MoCA, USA

- 2008 Les Rencontres Internationales, Beaux-arts de Paris, Paris

The Animal Gaze, London Metropolitan University, London
Re-Construction, curated by Ami Barak, YAB Bucharest Biennale, Bucharest
Map Games, Today Museum, Beijing, China; Birmingham City Art Museum, UK
AMBULANTE, Injerto, Gira de Documentales, Mexico City and touring

- 2007 RIWAK Biennale, curated by Charles Esche and Art School Palestine, Ramallah

About Time, Nordjyllands Kunstmuseum, Denmark
Nordic Video Festival, Sweden

- 2006 Panoramica, The Rufino Tamayo Museum, Mexico City

The Experiment, Peekskill Project, Peekskill, New York

- 2005 Vanishing Point, curated by Claudine Isé, Wexner Center for the Arts, Columbus, Ohio

LOOP Video Festival, Galeria del Angels, Barcelona
