= Devonport Golf Club =

Golf club in Tasmania, Australia

Devonport Country Club

Club information
- Location: Devonport, Tasmania
- Established: 1921; 105 years ago
- Type: public
- Tota holes: 18
- Tournaments: Tasmanian Open
- Website: https://devonportcountryclub.com.au/
- Designed by: Vern Morcom (1956)
- Par: 70
- Length: 5,880 metres

Devonport Country Club is an 18 hole championship golf course located at the Woodrising Golf Course, Woodrising Avenue, Spreyton, Tasmania. It is 5 minutes drive from the city of Devonport.

Woodrising’ offers the golfer with a challenging, tree-lined, well bunkered course that has excellent greens. The course sits on a peninsula of land leading into the Mersey River and has a fairly flat appearance with gently rolling fairways.

It is in the top ten golf courses in Tasmania.

Mike Harwood claimed his fourth Tasmanian Senior Open Title in February, 2015, other titles were won in 2009, 2010 and 2012.
