= 56–60 Bettington Street, Millers Point =

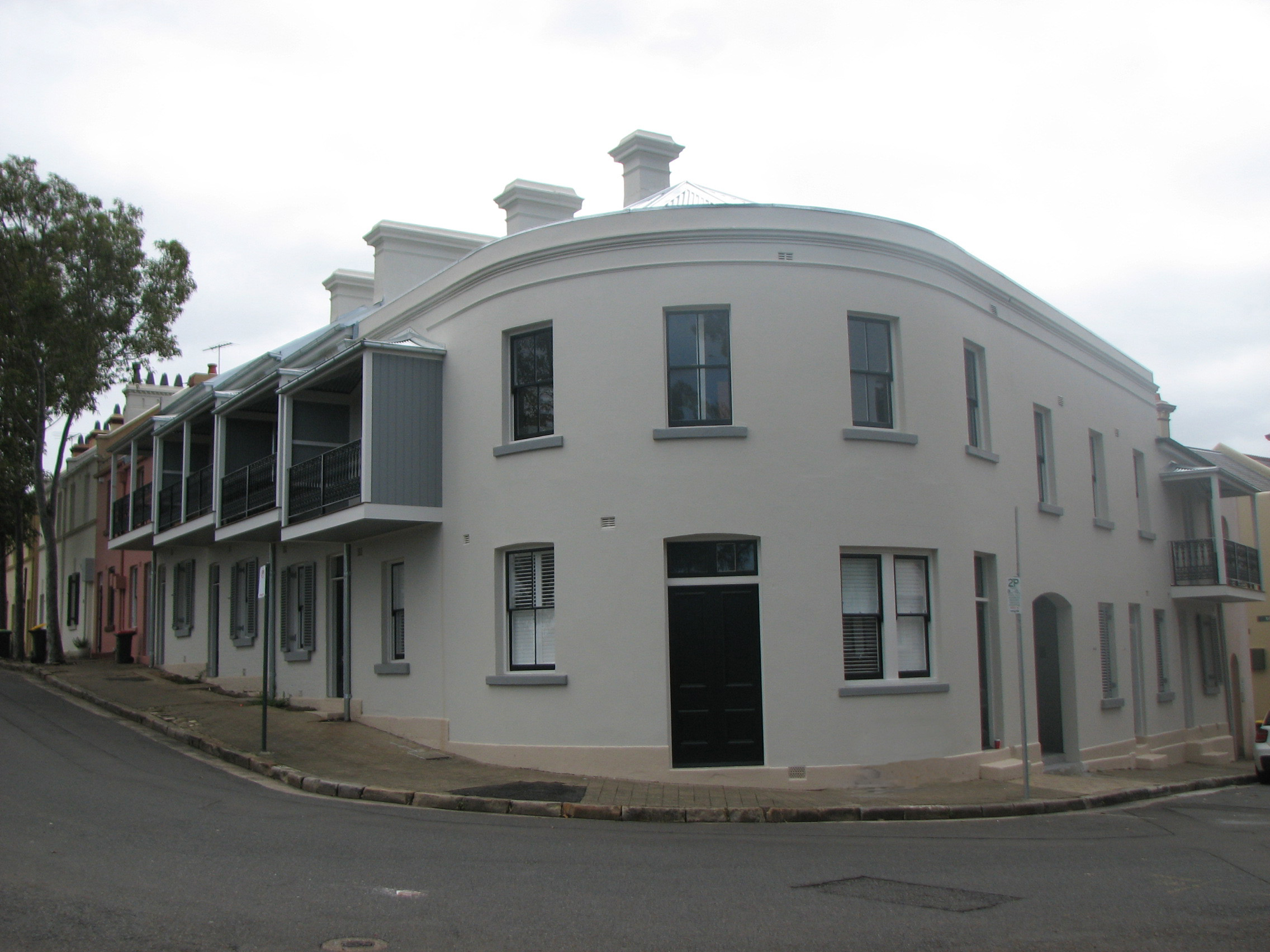
- 56–60 Bettington Street, Millers Point

- Location within Sydney Location within Australia
- 33.8578°S 151.2020°E
- Location: 56, 58, 60 Bettington Street, Millers Point, City of Sydney, New South Wales, Australia

History
- Built: c. 1870

Site notes
- Architectural style: Victorian

New South Wales Heritage Register
- Official name: Victorian Terrace
- Type: State heritage (built)
- Designated: 2 April 1999
- Reference no.: 922
- Type: Terrace
- Category: Residential buildings (private)

56–60 Bettington Street, Millers Point is a heritage-listed residence located at 56–60 Bettington Street, in the inner city Sydney suburb of Millers Point in the City of Sydney local government area of New South Wales, Australia. The property was added to the New South Wales State Heritage Register on 2 April 1999.

== History ==
Original buildings were constructed c. 1870. This site was redeveloped in the mid-1980s, keeping the existing Victorian terraces at 56, 58 & 60 Bettington Street and incorporating them into new development on the corner of Bettington Street and Rodens Lane and further along Rodens Lane for one bedroom units. First tenanted by the NSW Department of Housing in 1986.

A further development application was lodged in 2017 to redevelop the non-heritage-listed 1980s developments.

== Description ==
Victorian two-storey terrace, painted stuccoed wall finish. 4 one-bedroom units are listed at this address. Storeys: Two; Construction: Painted stuccoed rendered masonry, corrugated galvanised iron roof, timber verandah. Painted timber joinery. Style: Victorian

The external condition of the property is good.

== Heritage listing ==
As at 23 November 2000, the building makes a significant contribution to the streetscape of the immediate area owing to the sweeping curve of the facade at the corner of Bettington and Merriman Streets.

It is part of the Millers Point Conservation Area, an intact residential and maritime precinct. It contains residential buildings and civic spaces dating from the 1830s and is an important example of 19th century adaptation of the landscape.

56–60 Bettington Street, Millers Point was listed on the New South Wales State Heritage Register on 2 April 1999.

== See also ==
- Australian residential architectural styles
