= Harold Boddington =

English footballer

Personal information
- Full name: Harold Boddington
- Place of birth: Darlington, England
- Position: Outside forward

Senior career*
Years	Team	Apps	(Gls)
1903–1904	Middlesbrough	1	(0)
1904–19??	Darlington		
- * Club domestic league appearances and goals

Harold Boddington (active 1903–05) was an English footballer who played in the Football League as an outside left for Middlesbrough in 1903–04. He also played non-league football for Darlington.

Boddington made his only League appearance for Middlesbrough on 28 March 1904 in a 3–0 defeat away to Sheffield United in the First Division. He played and scored for Darlington of the Northern League in the 1904–05 FA Cup.
