= Reginald Beddington =

Reginald Beddington CBE

President of the Freshwater Biological Association of the British Empire
- In office 1930 – 11 March 1962

President of the National Association of Fishery Boards
- In office 1930–1946

Personal details
- Born: 15 August 1877 Paddington, London, England
- Died: 11 March 1962 (aged 84)
- Occupation: Angler, humanitarian

Reginald Beddington CBE (15 August 1877 – 11 March 1962) was an English angler and humanitarian.

Beddington was born in Paddington, London, and educated at Rugby School and Corpus Christi College, Oxford. He was called to the Bar at Lincoln's Inn in 1902, specialising in conveyancing, but on his father's death no longer had to work for a living and left the law to devote himself entirely to voluntary work. For many years he was chairman of the nursing committee of Middlesex Hospital. For thirty years he was a member of the Metropolitan Special Constabulary, commanding "F" Division (Paddington) in the First World War and serving on the Headquarters Staff at Scotland Yard in the Second World War. He was also chairman of the Dresden Homes for ladies in reduced circumstances at Hove for over fifty years from its foundation until his death.

A keen fisherman all his life, he campaigned for the preservation and conservation of British rivers. He was president of the Freshwater Biological Association of the British Empire from 1930 until his death and the National Association of Fishery Boards from 1930 to 1946. He also served on several government committees concerned with rivers and fisheries. During the Second World War he organised Fishing for the Forces to make it easy for servicemen on leave to go fishing.

He was appointed Officer of the Order of the British Empire (OBE) in the 1920 civilian war honours for his services to policing and Commander of the Order of the British Empire (CBE) in the 1939 Birthday Honours for his services to fishing.

He died at the age of 84. His wife was the sister of the philanthropist Basil Henriques. Their son, Roy Beddington (1910–1995), was a painter and angler of note.
