= Eustace Headlam =

Australian cricketer

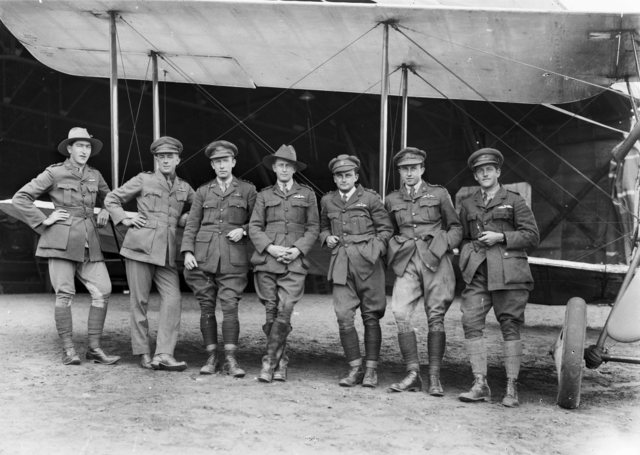
- Tasmanian aircrew from No. 1 Squadron AFC. Headlam is last on the right

Personal information
- Full name: Eustace Slade Headlam
- Born: 20 May 1892; Bothwell, Tasmania, Australia
- Died: 25 May 1958 (aged 66); Launceston, Tasmania, Australia

Domestic team information
- Years: Team
- 1911/12: Tasmania
- Source: Cricinfo, 22 January 2016

Eustace Slade Headlam (20 May 1892 – 25 May 1958) was an Australian cricketer and golfer. Born in Bothwell, Tasmania, Headlam was a left handed batsman and slow left arm orthodox bowler and played one first-class match for Tasmania in 1911/12, achieving a highest score of 32 not out.

During World War I, Headlam served in the Australian Army, enlisting on 14 April 1915 and returning to Australia on 4 March 1919, reaching the rank of lieutenant. He initially served with the 3rd Light Horse Regiment and embarked with their 6th reinforcements as a trooper for service overseas on 17 June 1915, departing Melbourne on HMAT Wandilla. He joined his unit at Gallipoli in October 1915 and served on the peninsula until the Australians were evacuated in December.

He later served in the Imperial Camel Corps before transferring to the Australian Flying Corps and was mentioned in despatches for his service post war. Serving in the Middle East, Headlam was initially an air observer, but later qualified as a pilot and took part in the Battle of Meggido in the final stages of the war. He was credited with five aerial victories. He was a law student before enlisting, attending the University of Tasmania.

In 1926, Headlam married Geraldine Archer. Headlam was also an avid golfer. He won the Tasmanian Open in 1913 and 1919 and the Tasmanian amateur championship five times between 1912 and 1927. In the 1930s, Headlam turned this into a career, becoming a professional golfer.

Headlam died on 25 May 1958, at Launceston, aged 66.

== See also ==
- List of Tasmanian representative cricketers
