= John Bettington =

Australian cricketer

Personal information
- Full name: Brindley Cecil John Bettington
- Born: 2 September 1898; Parramatta, Australia
- Died: 26 August 1931 (aged 32); Merriwa, New South Wales, Australia
- Relatives: Reg Bettington (brother)
- Source: Cricinfo, 22 December 2016

Brindley Cecil John Bettington (2 September 1898 – 26 August 1931) was an Australian cricketer. He played first-class cricket for New South Wales and Oxford University.

== See also ==
- List of New South Wales representative cricketers
- List of Oxford University Cricket Club players
