= Mick Ryan (golfer) =

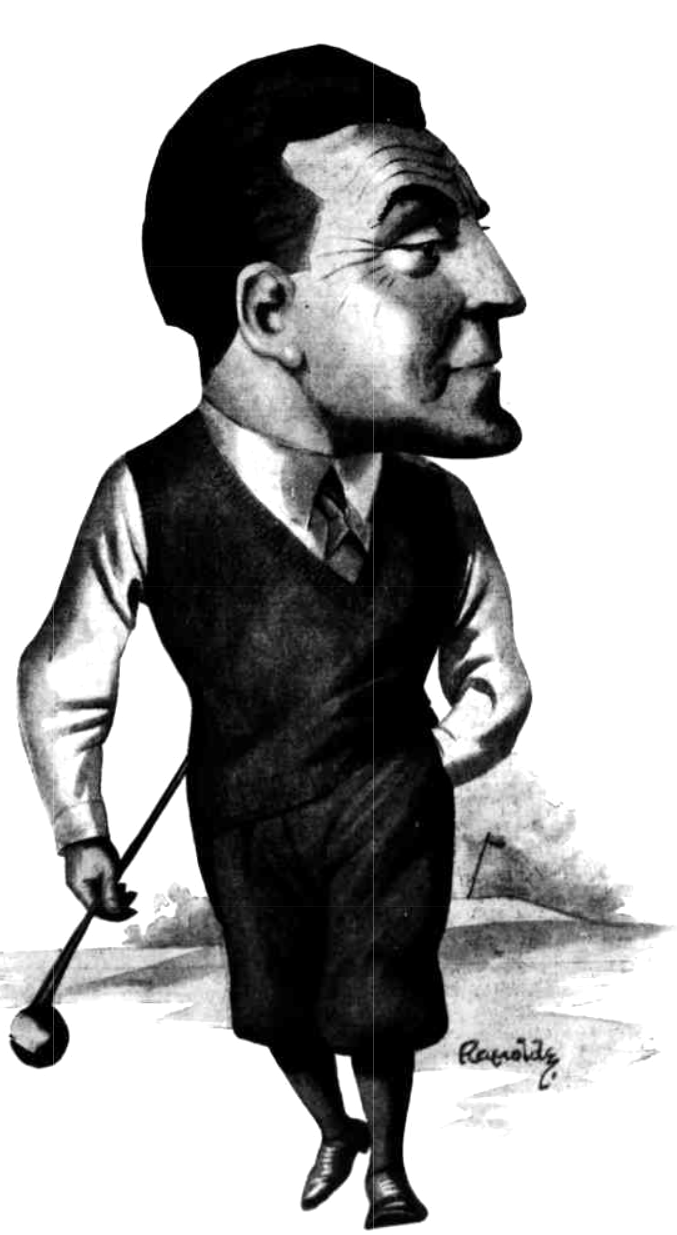
- 1929 caricature by Reynolds
- Born: Michael Joseph Ryan; 18 July 1897; Port Melbourne, Victoria
- Died: 1 August 1965 (aged 68); Cheltenham, Victoria
- Golf career
- Sport: Golf
- Status: Amateur
Australian rules football career
Personal information
- Original team: Port Melbourne CYMS (CYMSFA)
- Position: Midfield
Playing career^{1}
| Years | Club | Games (Goals) |
| 1918 | South Melbourne | 1 (0) |
- ^{1} Playing statistics correct to the end of 1918.

Michael Joseph Ryan (18 July 1897 – 1 August 1965) was an Australian amateur golfer.

== Career ==
Ryan also played Australian rules football for South Melbourne in the Victorian Football League (VFL). Ryan made just one senior appearance for South Melbourne, in the 1918 VFL season, when they defeated Richmond in a game at Lake Oval. South Melbourne went on to win the premiership that year.

Ryan joined the Royal Park Golf Club in 1925 and won their Championship the following year. He later went to Kingston Heath. In 1932, he won the Australian Open.

In 2002, he was named as one of the twelve members of the Victorian golfing team of the 20th century.

== Tournament wins ==
- 1929 Australian Amateur
- 1930 Victorian Amateur Championship
- 1932 Victorian Amateur Championship, Australian Open
- 1933 Riversdale Cup
- 1935 Riversdale Cup
- 1937 Queensland Amateur

== Team appearances ==
- Kirk-Windeyer Cup (representing Victoria): 1929, 1930
- Australian Men's Interstate Teams Matches (representing Victoria): 1929 (winners), 1930 (winners), 1931 (winners), 1932, 1933 (winners), 1934, 1935, 1936 (winners), 1937, 1939 (winners), 1946
