= Tom Crow (golfer) =

Australian cricketer (1931–2020)

- Born: Thomas Leslie Crow; 23 August 1931; Melbourne, Australia
- Died: 18 January 2020 (aged 88); La Jolla, California, U.S.
- Occupations: Businessman, sportsman
- Known for: Cobra Golf
- Cricket career

Cricket information

Domestic team information
- Years: Team
- 1952: Victoria
- Source: Cricinfo, 2 December 2015

Thomas Leslie Crow (23 August 1931 – 18 January 2020) was an Australian businessman and sportsman.

Crow was an accomplished golfer, winning the 1961 Australian Amateur championship, and representing Australia in the 1962 and 1964 Eisenhower Trophy. He then moved to California and founded the Cobra Golf company, helping to develop the Baffler club. Crow died in La Jolla, California, on 18 January 2020, at the age of 88.

He also played one first-class cricket match for Victoria in 1952.

== See also ==
- List of Victoria first-class cricketers
