= Robert Boddington =

English cricketer (1892–1977)

Robert Alan Boddington (30 June 1892 – 5 August 1977) was an English cricketer active from 1913 to 1924 who played for Lancashire and Oxford University. He was born in Salford and died in Oxford. He appeared in 56 first-class matches as a righthanded batsman and wicketkeeper. He scored 801 runs with a highest score of 69 and held 76 catches with 21 stumpings. His son, Myles Boddington, also played first-class cricket.
