= Alex Russell (golfer) =

Australian golfer (1892–1961)

Alex Russell MC (4 June 1892 – 22 November 1961) was an Australian grazier, soldier, golfer and golf course architect.

Russell was born at Geelong to grazier Philip Russell and Mary Gray, née Guthrie. He was sent to Glenalmond College in Scotland for his early schooling before returning to Australia, where he attended Geelong Grammar School, from which he graduated in 1911 having won distinction in both academic and sporting pursuits. He travelled to England in 1912 to study engineering at Cambridge University. He married Jess Lucy Fairbairn, daughter of Frederick Fairbairn, on 14 September 1917 at Chelsea.

Commissioned in the Royal Garrison Artillery on 9 October 1914, Russell served on the Western Front during World War I, where he was twice wounded, won the Military Cross, and in 1918 was promoted acting major. After the war he and his wife returned to Australia and lived at Sandringham in Melbourne, close to the Royal Melbourne Golf Club.

Both Russells became enthusiastic amateur players; Alex won the Riversdale Cup in 1929 and 1931, the Australian Open in 1924, the Australian foursomes of 1924 and 1926, and the South Australian Amateur and Victorian Amateur Championship in 1925, while Jess won the national ladies' foursomes in 1926 and 1927 and was runner-up in the 1927, 1930 and 1932 Australian Women's Amateur championships.

Russell helped to design the Black Rock west golf course (opened 1931) and supervised its construction; he also designed the eastern course, as well as courses at Karrinyup in Perth, Yarra Yarra in Melbourne, and Paraparaumu Beach, near Wellington in New Zealand. He was briefly private secretary to Prime Minister Stanley Bruce in the early 1920s. Russell and his wife moved in 1932 to Mawallok, his father's sheep station near Beaufort, and won prizes for his merino sheep; he would be President of the Australian Sheepbreeders' Association from 1950 to 1951.

During World War II Russell was deputy commissioner of the Australian Red Cross (1941–42) before becoming chief commissioner of the field force (1943–46), serving the Australian Imperial Force as a camp commandant in the intervening period. Mentioned in despatches, he was transferred to the Reserve of Officers in October 1943 as a lieutenant colonel. He was appointed a knight of grace of the Order of St John of Jerusalem in 1948 and continued his involvement with the Royal Melbourne Golf Club, serving as a councillor (1929–55). He retired to South Yarra, and died on 22 November 1961 at Heidelberg of hypertensive heart disease; he was cremated.
