= Reg Bettington =

Australian cricketer (1900–1969)

Personal information
- Full name: Reginald Henshall Brindley Bettington
- Born: 24 February 1900; Merriwa, New South Wales
- Died: 24 June 1969 (aged 69); Gisborne, New Zealand
- Batting: Right-handed
- Bowling: Right-arm leg-spin

Domestic team information
- Years: Team
- 1920 to 1923: Oxford University
- 1928: Middlesex
- 1928–29 to 1931–32: New South Wales

Career statistics
Competition	First-class
Matches	86
Runs scored	3314
Batting average	27.38
100s/50s	4/8
Top score	127
Balls bowled	14788
Wickets	357
Bowling average	23.79
5 wickets in innings	21
10 wickets in match	5
Best bowling	8/66
Catches/stumpings	60/–
- Source: Cricket Archive, 25 February 2014

Reginald Henshall Brindley Bettington (24 February 1900 – 24 June 1969) was an Australian first-class cricketer and medical specialist.

== Early life and Oxford ==
Reg Bettington was brought up on the family sheep station near Merriwa and attended The King's School, Parramatta from the age of 11, where he excelled at Latin and Greek and played for several years in the First XI cricket team. He went up to New College, Oxford University in 1919, and played cricket regularly for Oxford University for the next four seasons.

At 19, he was six-foot three and an imposing figure. "A very tall, very dark young man strode through the New College gates. We watched in awe," one English undergraduate later wrote. A leg-spinner and useful lower-order batsman, in his first match Bettington took 5 for 48 in Warwickshire's second innings. Alongside him for the Oxford team, also making their first-class debuts, were Douglas Jardine and R. C. Robertson-Glasgow. In his second match he took 5 for 52 in the second innings against Middlesex. In his third match he took 5 for 48 in Essex's second innings, including a hat-trick. In his fourth match he took seven wickets against Free Foresters, in his fifth, 7 for 47 and 5 for 52 against Somerset, and in his sixth, 8 for 67 and 5 for 61 against Surrey. At this stage Oxford had won five consecutive matches. In the next match, a loss to MCC, he took only three wickets, but it brought his first-class wicket tally to 50 in only his seventh match. He was selected for the Gentlemen in both their matches. As well as his cricket Blue in 1920 he also won his Rugby Blue and golf Blue.

He took 62 wickets at an average of 17.64 in the 1920 season. His form was less spectacular in 1921 and 1922 (35 wickets at 27.62 and 33 at 22.87), although he hit his first first-class century, 105 in 60 minutes, against H. D. G. Leveson Gower's XI in 1921. In 1923, however, when he captained Oxford, he took 61 wickets at 16.55 and led Oxford to victory in their annual match against Cambridge, when he took 3 for 19 and 8 for 66, and Oxford won by an innings and 227 runs. Jardine and Robertson-Glasgow were also in the team against Cambridge, also playing their last games for Oxford.

Over the four seasons Bettington played 40 matches for Oxford, taking 182 wickets at 19.38, as well as scoring 1351 runs at 24.12. He is Oxford University's leading wicket-taker in first-class cricket, one wicket ahead of Foster Cunliffe.

== After Oxford ==
After leaving Oxford with a medical degree, Bettington spent time working in Glasgow as an intern, before moving to London to practise at St Bartholomew's Hospital. He played only occasional cricket matches for four seasons, turning out for amateur teams such as Free Foresters, Gentlemen, and H.D.G. Leveson Gower's XI. In June 1925 he twice bowled out Oxford University, taking 6 for 75 and 6 for 52 (and scoring 16 and 81) for Free Foresters and two weeks later 6 for 25 and 3 for 51 for H.D.G. Leveson Gower's XI.

Before returning to Australia in late 1928 he played a season with Middlesex. In 20 matches he scored 1078 runs at 39.92, with three centuries, and took 74 wickets at 32.59. Against Sussex at Lord's he made 28 and 95 and took 4 for 87 and 6 for 78 in a 112-run victory. However, none of his three centuries were for Middlesex: he scored 118 for H.D.G. Leveson Gower's XI against Cambridge University, 127 for Harlequins against the West Indians, and 114 for MCC against Kent.

== Return to Australia ==
As soon as he returned to Australia, Bettington was selected to play in an Australian XI, consisting mostly of Test aspirants, including Archie Jackson and Don Bradman, against the touring English team. He took four wickets, including Douglas Jardine twice. Later in the season he played one match in the Sheffield Shield for New South Wales, and he added another in 1929–30, and two more in 1931–32 (as captain) as well as a match against the touring South Africans. In five matches for New South Wales he took 10 wickets at 50.60. He was also captain of North Sydney, where he encouraged Bill O'Reilly. When the state selectors left O'Reilly out of the New South Wales team at one stage during 1931–32, Bettington declared himself unavailable, leaving the selectors with little choice but to restore O'Reilly. O'Reilly bowled so well subsequently that he was included in the Test side against South Africa later in the season.

One of Bettington's opponents in the 1923 university match was Tom Lowry, who became a close friend. In April 1929 Bettington married Lowry's sister Marion at the Lowry property in Hawke's Bay, New Zealand. Lowry's other sister Gertrude (known as "Beet") had married another of Tom's friends, the English Test captain Percy Chapman, in 1925.

Marion's parents bought them a house in Darling Point, not far from Sydney Harbour, where they settled after their wedding. Bettington began practising as an ear, nose and throat specialist in Macquarie Street, Sydney. During the Bodyline tour of 1932–33 Douglas Jardine and his wife stayed with the Bettingtons, although Reg made clear his disapproval of Jardine's Bodyline tactics.

Bettington had kept up his golf, and won both the Australian Amateur and NSW Amateur titles in 1932. In 1932 he captained New South Wales at both cricket and golf. Playing together, he and Marion won the New South Wales mixed foursomes title three years in a row.

== England, war and New Zealand ==
In 1938, the Bettingtons moved to London, where Reg took up a position in Harley Street and was accepted into the Royal College of Surgeons. He played his last two first-class matches in 1938, for Free Foresters and MCC.

With the approach of war, he and Marion decided to return to Australia. Major Bettington served as a medic in the Army from April 1940 to December 1945, including four years in battle zones in the Middle East and Papua. Their daughter Victoria was born in Sydney in May 1945.

After the war he worked at Concord Hospital in Sydney. In 1951, Marion, visiting her mother in New Zealand, saw a vacancy for an ear, nose and throat specialist at Napier Hospital, and Reg applied and was successful. He spent the rest of his life in that position.

== Death and family ==
Reg Bettington died when his car left the road while he was driving to a clinic in Gisborne on a foggy day in 1969. He was survived by Marion and their daughter, Victoria.

Reg's elder brother John (1898–1931) played first-class cricket for Oxford University and New South Wales.
