= 1907 in the United Kingdom =

Events from the year 1907 in the United Kingdom.

== Incumbents ==
- Monarch – Edward VII
- Prime Minister – Henry Campbell-Bannerman (Liberal)

== Events ==
- 13 January – The steamship Pengwern founders in the North Sea: crew and 24 men lost.
- 26 January
  - First performance of J. M. Synge's play The Playboy of the Western World at the Abbey Theatre in Dublin triggers a week of rioting.
  - The Short Magazine Lee–Enfield rifle is officially introduced into British military service.
- 5 February – Alarm at an epidemic of meningitis in Glasgow, Edinburgh and Belfast.
- 7 February – The "Mud March", the first large procession organised by the National Union of Women's Suffrage Societies (NUWSS), takes place in London.
- 21 February – The mail steamer Berlin wrecked off the Hook of Holland: 142 lives lost.
- 27 February – The Old Bailey criminal court opens in London.
- 19 March – National Library and National Museum of Wales are established by Royal Charter.
- 22 March – The first taxicabs with taximeters begin operating in London.
- 6 April – Horatio Phillips achieves the first, limited, powered heavier-than-air flight in the UK when his multiplane makes a 500 ft (150 m) hop.
- 13 May–1 June – 5th Congress of the Russian Social Democratic Labour Party held at the Brotherhood Church in the London borough of Hackney. Lenin, Trotsky, Stalin and Litvinov attend, the latter two staying in the Whitechapel Rowton House.
- 1 June – Colin Blythe of Kent takes 17 wickets for 48 runs against Northamptonshire at Northampton in one day. It is the best analysis ever recorded for a county cricket match (or for a single day's bowling), and not bettered in first-class cricket until almost half a century later in 1956.
- 11 June – George Dennett of Gloucestershire, aided by Gilbert Jessop, dismisses Northamptonshire for 12 runs, the lowest total in first-class cricket.
- 17 June – Brooklands, the world's first motor racing track opens, at Weybridge, Surrey.
- 6 July – Guardians of the Irish Crown Jewels notice that they have been stolen.
- 13 July – The Edward Medal instituted to recognise acts of bravery by miners and quarrymen in endangering their lives to rescue fellow workers in accidents (extended 1909 to cover other industries).
- 1–9 August – Baden-Powell leads the first Scout camp on Brownsea Island.
- 12 August – Troops open fire during rioting in Belfast, killing four Irish nationalists.
- 27 August – The Education (Administrative Provisions) Act 1907 extends powers of local education authorities in England and Wales in relation to scholarships for grammar schools (the 'free place' system), the provision of holiday activities and medical inspections of elementary school children.
- 28 August
  - The Criminal Appeal Act creates a Court of Criminal Appeal (England and Wales).
  - The Companies Act introduces an explicit distinction between private and public companies.
- 31 August – Sir Arthur Nicolson and Count Alexander Izvolsky sign the Anglo-Russian Entente in Saint Petersburg and set the foundation for The Triple Entente.
- 7 September – Passenger liner RMS Lusitania sets out on her maiden voyage from Liverpool to New York.
- 9 September – New Zealand is granted dominion status within the British Empire.
- 10 September – British Army Dirigible No 1, Nulli Secundus, the UK's first powered airship, makes her first flight. On 5 October, she flies from the School of Ballooning, Farnborough, Hampshire, to London in 3 hours 25 minutes.
- 11 September – Camden Town Murder: London prostitute Emily Dimmock's throat is cut. On 19 December, Robert Wood, an artist charged with the crime and defended by Edward Marshall Hall, is acquitted, to popular acclaim.
- 1 October – 1907 Birmingham Tramway accident: two people are killed and 17 injured.
- 15 October – Shrewsbury rail accident: A London & North Western Railway sleeping car train suffers derailment passing through Shrewsbury station at excessive speed; 18 lives are lost.
- 28 October
  - Deceased Wife's Sister's Marriage Act 1907 removes the absolute prohibition in secular law on a widower marrying his dead wife's unmarried sister.
  - First organised British school meal service for all pupils, a dinner of scotch barley broth and fruit tart, served to pupils at Green Lane Primary School in Manningham, Bradford, by headmaster Jonathan Priestley.
- 1 November – First performance of John Hughes' hymn tune Cwm Rhondda, at Capel Rhondda Welsh Baptist Chapel, Hopkinstown, Pontypridd, with text in English translation.
- 9 November – The Cullinan Diamond is presented to King Edward VII on his sixty-sixth birthday.
- 16 November – Passenger liner RMS Mauretania sets out on her maiden voyage from Liverpool to New York.
- 29 November – Florence Nightingale becomes the first woman to receive the Order of Merit, for her nursing work during the Crimean War.
- 10 December – Rudyard Kipling wins the Nobel Prize in Literature "in consideration of the power of observation, originality of imagination, virility of ideas and remarkable talent for narration which characterize the creations of this world-famous author".

=== Undated ===
- The Tudor Barrington Court in Somerset becomes the first large English country house acquired by The National Trust.
- The Moine Thrust Belt in the Scottish Highlands is identified by geologists, one of the first to be discovered.

== Publications ==
- The Cambridge History of English Literature begins publication.
- Joseph Conrad's novel The Secret Agent.
- E. M. Forster's novel The Longest Journey.
- R. Austin Freeman's novel The Red Thumb Mark.
- Elinor Glyn's novel Three Weeks.
- Edmund Gosse's autobiography Father and Son.
- John H. Glover-Kind's music-hall song "I Do Like to Be Beside the Seaside".
- Elsie J. Oxenham's children's novel Goblin Island.

== Births ==
- 1 January – Barbara Noble, novelist (died 2001)
- 10 January – Nicholas Evans, Welsh artist (died 2004)
- 17 January – Alfred Wainwright, fellwalker and writer (died 1991)
- 18 January – Walter Verco, herald (died 2001)
- 22 January – Dixie Dean, footballer (died 1980)
- 28 January – Henry Cotton, golfer (died 1987)
- 11 February – E. W. Swanton, cricket commentator (died 2000)
- 19 February – Frances Perry, gardener (died 1993)
- 21 February – W. H. Auden, poet (died 1973 in Austria)
- 24 February – Bernard Kettlewell, geneticist and lepidopterist (died 1979)
- 27 February – Kenneth Horne, radio comedy performer (died 1969)
- 8 March – Graham Balcombe, cave diver (died 2000)
- 11 March – Richard Wilberforce, judge (died 2003)
- 12 March – Arthur Hewlett, actor (died 1997)
- 18 March – John Zachary Young, biologist (died 1997)
- 19 March – Elizabeth Maconchy, composer (died 1994)
- 6 April – Richard Murdoch, radio comedy actor (died 1990)
- 15 April – Lynton Lamb, illustrator and stamp designer (died 1977)
- 19 April – Alan Wheatley, actor (died 1991)
- 23 April
  - Barbara Hamilton, 14th Baroness Dudley, noblewoman (died 2002)
  - James Hayter, actor (died 1983)
- 24 April – William Sargant, psychiatrist (died 1988)
- 13 May
  - David Drummond, 8th Earl of Perth, peer (died 2002)
  - Daphne du Maurier, novelist (died 1989)
  - Catherine Gavin, historian (died 1999)
- 18 May – Clifford Curzon, pianist (died 1982)
- 21 May – Dandy Nichols, actress (died 1986)
- 22 May – Laurence Olivier, actor and director (died 1989)
- 1 June – Frank Whittle, aeronautical engineer (died 1996)
- 14 June – Nicolas Bentley, writer and illustrator (died 1978)
- 23 June – James Meade, economist, Nobel Prize laureate (died 1995)
- 26 June
  - Joan Harrison, screenwriter and producer (died 1994)
  - Peter Lloyd, mountaineer (died 2003)
- 28 June – Emily Perry, actress (died 2008)
- 9 July – Teresa Jungman, socialite (died 2010)
- 15 July – Paterson Fraser, air marshal (died 2001)
- 18 July
  - H. L. A. Hart, legal philosopher (died 1992)
  - Mary Stott, journalist and feminist (died 2002)
- 23 July – Elspeth Huxley, writer and journalist (died 1997)
- 27 July
  - Richard Beesly, Olympic gold medal rower (died 1965)
  - Mollie Phillips, figure skater (died 1994)
- 2 August – Alec Clifton-Taylor, architectural historian and broadcaster (died 1985)
- 7 August – Bernard Brodie, biochemist, "founder of modern pharmacology" (died 1989 in the United States)
- 13 August – William Astor, 3rd Viscount Astor, politician (died 1966)
- 15 August – Bob Pearson, singer and pianist, part of Bob and Alf Pearson double act (died 1985)
- 22 August – Cyril Clarke, physician and lepidopterist (died 2000)
- 28 August – Rupert Hart-Davis, publisher (died 1999)
- 12 September – Louis MacNeice, poet (died 1963)
- 22 September – Elisabeth Croft, actress (died 2003)
- 25 September – Raymond Glendenning, radio sports commentator (died 1974)
- 27 September – Bernard Miles, actor and director (died 1991)
- 2 October – Alexander R. Todd, Baron Todd, chemist, Nobel Prize laureate (died 1997)
- 6 October – Philip Martell, composer (died 1993)
- 9 October – Quintin Hogg, Baron Hailsham of St Marylebone, politician (died 2001)
- 3 November – Christopher Bonham-Carter, admiral (died 1975)
- 10 November – John Moore, author and conservationist (died 1967)
- 15 November – N. G. L. Hammond, scholar (died 2001)
- 10 December – Rumer Godden, writer (died 1998)
- 12 December – Jean Anderson, actress (died 2001)
- 18 December – Christopher Fry, playwright (died 2005)
- 21 December – Will Roberts, painter (died 2000)
- 22 December – Peggy Ashcroft, actress (died 1991)

== Deaths ==
- 21 January – Bertram Fletcher Robinson, author, editor and journalist (born 1870)
- 26 February – Charles W. Alcock, footballer, journalist and football promoter (born 1842)
- 1 March – Sir August Manns, conductor (born 1825)
- 9 March – Frederic George Stephens, art critic (born 1828)
- 10 March – George Douglas-Pennant, 2nd Baron Penrhyn, industrialist (born 1836)
- 19 May – Sir Benjamin Baker, civil engineer (born 1840)
- 6 June – J. A. Chatwin, architect (born 1830)
- 19 June – Thomas Andrews, metallurgical chemist (born 1847)
- 5 July – John Romilly Allen, archaeologist (born 1847)
- 9 July – Sir Alfred Billson, politician (born 1839)
- 14 July – Sir William Henry Perkin, chemist (born 1838)
- 25 August – Mary Elizabeth Coleridge, poet and novelist (born 1861)
- 9 September – Ernest Wilberforce, bishop (born 1840)
- 6 November – Sir James Hector, Scottish geologist (born 1834)
- 12 November – Sir Lewis Morris, Anglo-Welsh poet (born 1833)
- 2 December – Charles Robert Drysdale, birth control advocate (born c. 1829)
- 17 December – William Thomson, 1st Baron Kelvin, Ulster Scots physicist and engineer (born 1824)
- 31 December – Michael Marks, joint founder of Marks & Spencer retail chain (born 1859)

== See also ==
- List of British films before 1920
