= Angela Brazil =

British writer (1868-1947)

- Angela Brazil, c. early 1920s
- Born: 30 November 1868; Preston, Lancashire, England
- Died: 13 March 1947 (aged 78); Coventry, Warwickshire, England
- Education: Heatherley School of Fine Art
- Occupation: Children's book author
- Writing career
- Period: 1904–1946
- Genre: School stories
- Notable works: The Fortunes of Philippa; The Nicest Girl in the School

Angela Brazil (pronounced "brazzle") (Note: Until her father's death the name was pronounced like the country, but Angela decided that the emphasis should be on the first syllable.) (30 November 1868 – 13 March 1947) (Note: Freeman repeatedly gives Brazil's year of birth as 1869.. She was born on St. Andrew's Day, 30 November. That she was born in 1868 is confirmed from the registry of births, census entries, and from the date of birth she gave for the 1939 Register. The error appears to have arisen as, while she was born in 1868, her birth was only registered by her father in Preston on 9 January 1869. This was a longer interval between birth and registration than was normal, but there may have been domestic factors that led to delay.) was one of the first British writers of "modern schoolgirls' stories", written from the characters' point of view and intended primarily as entertainment rather than moral instruction. In the first half of the 20th century she published nearly 50 books of girls' fiction, the vast majority being boarding school stories. She also published numerous short stories in magazines.

Her books were commercially successful, widely read by pre-adolescent girls, and influenced them. Though interest in girls' school stories waned after World War II, her books remained popular until the 1960s. They were seen as disruptive and a negative influence on moral standards by some figures in authority during the height of their popularity, and in some cases were banned, or indeed burned, by headmistresses in British girls' schools.

While her stories have been much imitated in more recent decades, and many of her motifs and plot elements have since become clichés or the subject of parody, they were innovative when they first appeared. Brazil made a major contribution to changing the nature of fiction for girls. She presented a young female point of view which was active, aware of current issues and independent-minded; she recognised adolescence as a time of transition, and accepted girls as having common interests and concerns which could be shared and acted upon.

== Biography ==
=== Early life ===
Angela Brazil was born on 30 November 1868, at her home, 1 West Cliff, Preston, Lancashire. (Note: Freeman) She was the youngest child of Clarence Brazil, a mill manager, and Angelica McKinnel, the daughter of the owner of a shipping line in Rio de Janeiro, who had a Spanish mother. Angela was the youngest of four siblings including sister Amy, and two brothers, Clarence and Walter.

Her father Clarence was distant, seldom involved himself in his children's affairs, and saw himself primarily as a provider for the material well-being of the family and responsible for ensuring the children were appropriately schooled in religious tradition. She was primarily influenced by her mother, Angelica, who had suffered during her Victorian English schooling, and was determined to bring up her children in a liberated, creative and nurturing manner, encouraging them to be interested in literature, music and botany, a departure from the typical distant attitude towards children adopted by parents in the Victorian era. Angela was treated with great affection by her sister Amy from an early age, and Amy effected an immense, perhaps dominating influence on Angela throughout her life.

The family moved around the mill towns of south-east Lancashire, following her father's work opportunities. They lived in Manchester and Bolton, before settling in Bury.

=== Schooling ===
She commenced her education at age four at Miss Knowle's Select Ladies School in Preston, but lasted only a half-day. Having been brought up to express herself freely, she shocked the younger Miss Knowles by removing the teacher's hair pins while sitting on her knee, an action little in keeping with the strict disciplinarian ethos of the school. She was enrolled in The Turrets in Wallasey.

She was briefly at Manchester Secondary School and finally at Ellerslie, a fairly exclusive girls' school in Malvern, where she boarded in her later adolescence.

Her memories of her own schooldays were her most treasured, and she retained aspects of that period of her life into her adult years:

To be able to write for young people depends, I consider, largely upon whether you are able to retain your early attitude of mind while acquiring a certain facility with your pen. It is a mistake ever to grow up! I am still an absolute schoolgirl in my sympathies.

Her post-school education was at Heatherley School of Fine Art in London, where she studied with her sister Amy. It is possible she took a position as a governess, but mostly lived with her family. After her father's death, in 1899, the family moved to the Conwy valley, and she travelled with her mother in Europe.

=== Commencing writing ===
Brazil first starting writing at age 10, producing a magazine with her close childhood friend Leila Langdale, which was modelled on Little Folks, a children's publication of the time she was very fond of. The two girls' 'publication' included riddles, short stories and poems. Both girls wrote serials within their magazine; Brazil's was called Prince Azib. Later in life Brazil published in Little Folks.

She began writing seriously for children in her 30s. Her first school story was The Fortunes of Philippa, which was based on the experiences of her mother. It was not published until 1906, and her first published children's novel was A Terrible Tomboy (1904).

=== Move to Coventry ===
She spent most of her time with her mother until her death, and thereafter with her elder sister Amy, and brother Walter. She had only two major friendships outside the family circle, one of which started in her school days and the other in her 30s. Both friends were schoolgirls when the friendships first commenced.

She moved to 1 The Quadrant, Coventry in 1911, with her brother and they were joined by her sister Amy upon their mother's death in 1915. Brazil became a well-known figure in the local area.

She was well known in Coventry high society as a hostess and threw parties for adults, with a greater number of female guests, at which children's food and games were featured. She had no children of her own but also hosted many parties for children.

She read widely and collected early children's fiction; her collection is now in Coventry library. She took great interest in local history and antiquities, and also involved herself in charity work. She was an early conservationist, taking an interest in both the preservation of land and monuments, worked for the City of Coventry Cathedral and the Y.W.C.A, and was a founding member of the City Guild.

She never married.

== Her writing ==
=== Writing and publication ===
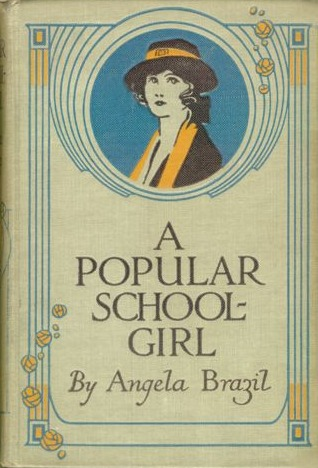
Cover of A Popular Schoolgirl from a 1921 US edition

She was quite late in taking up writing, developing a strong interest in Welsh mythology, and at first wrote a few magazine articles on mythology and nature - due most likely to spending holidays in an ancient cottage called Ffynnon Bedr in Llanbedr y Cennin, North Wales (a plaque at the cottage states she lived there 1902–1927).

Her first publication was a book of four children's plays entitled The Mischievous Brownie. Written in Wales, and published in 1899 by T W. Paterson of Edinburgh, the plays featured fairies, ogres and enchantments. Family and friends encouraged her to write a novel for an adult audience, but she had already set her heart on writing for children. She began work on her first full-length tale for children, The Fortunes of Philippa, in the same year, after her father's death.

Her first published novel was,, A Terrible Tomboy" (1905), but this was not strictly a school story. The story was autobiographical, with Brazil represented as the principal character Peggy, and her friend Leila Langdale appearing as Lilian. It was an early success for Brazil, and did well in the United States, perhaps as a result of the popularity of Tomboy stories, which had grown in popularity in that country since the mid-19th century.

Her long sequence of school stories did not commence until the publication of her second novel The Fortunes of Philippa (1906). The novel was based on her mother, Angelica Brazil, who had grown up in Rio de Janeiro and attended an English boarding school at the age of 10, finding the English culture, school life and climate confronting.

The Fortunes of Philippa was an instant success, and Brazil soon received commissions to produce similar work. In total she published 49 novels about life in boarding schools, and approximately 70 short stories, which appeared in magazines. Her average production of these tales was two novels and five short stories each year.

Her fifth novel, Bosom Friends: A Seaside Story (1910) was published by Nelson's, but subsequent books were all published by Blackie and Sons. Blackie and Sons sold three million copies of her novels. Her most popular school story novel, The Nicest Girl in The School (1909) sold 153,000 copies. By 1920 the school story was the most popular genre for girls.

=== Style and themes ===
Angela Brazil is seen as the first writer of girls' school story fiction who wrote stories from the point of view of the pupils and whose stories were mostly intended to entertain readers, rather than instruct them on moral principles. She intended to write stories that were fun and included characters who were ordinary people. She wrote for girls gaining a greater level of freedom in the early 20th century and intended to capture their point of view.

Unlike many of her successors, Brazil never wrote a series of books set in a particular school, although there are three pairs of books among her 46 full-length school stories: A Fortunate Term and Monitress Merle; At School with Rachel and St. Catherine's College; and The Little Green School and Jean's Golden Term. Monitress Merle also has a substantial character overlap with The Head Girl at The Gables, and A Fortunate Term has a slight connection with The Girls of St. Cyprian's. Most of her novels present new characters, a new school and a new scenario, although these are frequently formulaic, especially in the books written later in her career.

Her schools usually have between 20 and 50 pupils and so are able to create a community which is an extended family, but also of sufficient size to function as a kind of micro state, with its own traditions and rules. The schools tend to be situated in picturesque circumstances, being manors, having moats, being built on clifftops or on moors, and the style of teaching is often progressive, including experiments in self-expression, novel forms of exercise, and different social groups and activities for the girls.

The narrative focuses on the girls, who tend to be between 14 and 15. Although they are high-spirited and active, they are not eccentric or directly conflicting with social norms, as had been the case with Tomboy fiction. They are adolescents, shown as being in a normal period of transition in their lives, with a restlessness that tends to be expressed by minor adventures such as climbing out of dormitory windows at night, playing pranks on one another and their teachers and searching for spies in their midst. They also typically develop their own behavioural codes, have a slang or secret language, which is exclusive to the school.

The stories tend to focus on relationships between the pupils, including alliances between pairs and groups of girls, jealousy between them, and the experience of characters who feel excluded from the school community. Events which have become familiar from the girls' school fiction written since Brazil, are common, such as secret night-time meetings, achieving and receiving honours or prizes and events at the end of term such as concerts.

In addition to her books, she also contributed a large number of school stories to children's annuals and the Girl's Own Paper.

== Antecedents and influences ==
Brazil did not invent the story of boarding school life, although she was a major influence over its transformation. There was already an established tradition of fiction for young women, in which school life was presented as a crucible for their development. The Governess, or The Little Female Academy by Sarah Fielding, published in 1749, is generally seen as the first boarding school story. Fielding's novel was a moralistic tale with tangents offering instruction on behaviour, and each of the nine girls in the novel relate their story individually. However it did establish aspects of the boarding school story which were repeated in later works. The school is self-contained with little connection to local life, the girls are encouraged to live together with a sense of community and collective responsibility, and one of the characters experiences a sleepless night, a standard motif in subsequent girls' fiction.

Fielding's approach was imitated and used as a formula by both her contemporaries and other writers into the 19th century. Susan Coolidge in What Katy Did at School (1873) and Frances Hodgson Burnett, with Sara Crewe: or what Happened at Miss Minchin's (1887) (later rewritten as A Little Princess) also used a girls' school setting. A character in Brazil's The Third Class at Miss Kaye's quotes these novels as an example of the sort of rigid Victorian environment she had been expecting to find at boarding school. However, probably the most widely read and influential of Brazil's 19th-century predecessors in girls' fiction, was L. T. Meade. Meade was voted most popular writer in 1898 by the readers of Girls' Realm and used some innovations in her girls' school stories which were later developed by Brazil.

== Literary and social context ==
=== Shift towards collective education for girls ===
In the first decades of the 20th century there was a change in education for middle-class girls. Previously it had been common for girls to be educated by a private tutor, an approach which led to young women growing up with a feeling of isolation from their peers. Brazil's boarding school stories were a prominent expression of this shift, and helped promote a sense of young women being a community with a shared identity as schoolgirls, in which individual girls could share common concerns and issues affecting their lives and act together. The emerging middle classes also could not afford private tuition for their daughters, and while anxious not to send them to poor schools, took advantage of the growing number of private schools for girls, of which there were at least one in most English cities by 1878.

=== Change in general education for girls ===
Brazil's first schoolgirl tales were also published in an era of increased literacy for girls, encouraged by the education acts passed into law in 1902 and 1907 and thus appeared at a particularly ripe time for publishing success and influence upon readers beyond those able to attend boarding schools. Between 1900 and 1920, the number of girls at grammar schools increased from 20,000 to 185,000. Curriculum for girls' study in general also become more liberal in this period. During the same period boarding schools for girls had gain respectability among middle-class parents. These schools included a range of activities besides academic study, including activities such as lacrosse, hockey and fencing. Together with changes in the wider social context, which gave more educational and professional openings for girls, this reflected a more general sense of a world where a wider enjoyment of life and opportunity was much more available for girls than had been the case.

=== Changing norms in girls' fiction ===
Much of the fiction for girls being published at the turn of the century was instructional, and focused on promoting self-sacrifice, moral virtues, dignity and aspiring to a settled position in an ordered society. Brazil's fiction presented energetic characters who openly challenged authority, were cheeky, perpetrated pranks, and lived in a world which celebrated their youth and in which adults and their concerns were sidelined.

While popular with girls, Brazil's books were not approved of by many adults and even banned by some headmistresses, seeing them as subversive and damaging to young minds. In 1936 Ethel Strudwick, principal of St Paul's Girls' School in London, reacted to a novella about the school by announcing at morning prayers that she would gather all of Brazil's books and set them alight.

Brazil's own fiction also changed to reflect developing attitudes and changing social mores and the changing expectations of her readers. Her stories written before 1914, the beginning of the First World War, lean more towards issues of character that were typical in Victorian fiction for girls. Those written after this become more critical of this approach, and the heroines more liberated, in parallel with changing possibilities and attitudes towards girls and their potential to become more active in wider aspects of society.

=== Parallel to developments in fiction for boys ===
Boys' school stories were popular from the 1870s until the 1930s and continued to find an audience into the 1970s. Prominent writers included Talbot Baines Reed, and Charles Hamilton, who wrote under a number of pen names, including Frank Richards, as author of the successful Greyfriars School series. Anthony Buckeridge later wrote the Jennings books. Themes between boys' and girls' school fiction had some commonality, such as sports, honour, and friendship.

It has been claimed that the appearance of girls' boarding school stories was a response to a parallel development of the equivalent for boys in the same period, and there are certainly elements of boys' stories, such as Tom Brown's Schooldays by Thomas Hughes, and the Greyfriars tales by Frank Richards, appear to have been borrowed by writers of girls' stories, including Brazil. However, this may accord an undue influence to this literature, as there had been a gradual development from the 18th century toward fiction which was more specifically focused on gender, and many of the tropes in Brazil's books derive from the real-life schools attended by early 20th-century girls.

There were also male readers of Brazil's works, although they tended to consume these books secretly and guiltily. These including a number of prominent figures, who confessed to liking the stories in childhood, later in life. This was also a period in which girls' high schools and boarding schools were developing, drawing on aspects of the longer-established boys' boarding schools, but also developing their own culture which was more focused on encouraging friendship and security: elements which many boys, not attracted to the culture of tough masculinity in boys' schools, could relate to. There may also have been as aspect of voyeuristic attraction in boys reading stories about an environment exclusively focused on girls.

== Influence ==
Angela Brazil is frequently held to be largely responsible for establishing the girls' school story genre, which exerted a major effect on the reading practices of girls for decades after she began publishing her novels, although this belief has been challenged. Her motifs and ideas have become a common part of popular imagination since publication and inspired many imitators and successors. J.K. Rowling's Harry Potter series draws upon many elements of English public school education fiction that Brazil's work helped to establish.

Towards the end of the 20th century, girls' school stories had in many respects become seen as a cliché, with standard character types such as the oddball but courageous new girl and the practical but fair headmistress, and recurring scenes such as a midnight feast, pranks, heroic rescues and concert at the end of term. Many parodies of these types of stories have been produced. However, when Brazil first wrote schoolgirl tales she was not simply repeating established norms in fiction for young women, and her approach (together with other girls' writers of this period) was innovative and actually establishing new ideas about girls' lives, which were simplified and turned into stock motifs by later writers.

Popular writers of girls' school stories who certainly read Angela Brazil's books include Elinor Brent-Dyer with her Chalet School series, and Enid Blyton with her tales about Malory Towers and St Clares. Brent-Dyer, whose first volume in the Chalet School series appeared in 1925, published 57 more books in the series and these books were still selling 150,000 copies a year in the late 1990s. Dorita Fairlie Bruce and Elsie Oxenham should also be mentioned and from the 21st century, Tyne O'Connell. Despite the fact that many of these stories included archaic motifs and representations, they still remain popular.

== Interpretations of lesbian content ==
It has been suggested that Brazil's tales were intended to be covertly expressive of lesbian themes. Her stories of friendships between girls do include kissing between pupils and less frequently between pupils and teachers, and also elements of adolescent jealousy, but such actions would likely have been viewed as relatively unremarkable at a time when romantic friendships were common. It is possible that Brazil, writing about her own youthful experiences of schoolgirl life, was completely unaware of these implications, and passionate friendships between adolescent girls are not uncommon. Nevertheless, the tone of the relationships in her stories was highly sentimental and might be interpreted as having erotic implications. In fact, Brazil seemed particularly attached to the name Lesbia, which was given to several important characters: Lesbia Ferrars in Loyal to the School, for instance, and Lesbia Carrington in For the School Colours. Both of these seem to have been largely self-portraits, suitably idealised.

== Bibliography ==
This bibliography is based largely around the bibliography given in Sims and Clare, supplemented with information from the Jisc Library Hub Discover, (Note: The Jisc Library Hub Discover brings together the catalogues of 165 Major UK and Irish libraries. Additional libraries are being added all the time, and the catalogue collates national, university, and research libraries.) and other sources as indicated. The column On PG indicates is the book is available on Project Gutenberg.

Books written by Angela Brazil
No	Title	Published	Year	Illustrator	Pages (from Jisc)	On PG	Notes
1	The Mischievous Brownie	Patterson, Edinburgh	1899		19 p., 8º	No	(Note: A play for children. Reissued by Patterson in 1913.)
2	The Fairy Gifts	Patterson, Edinburgh	1901		24 p., 8º	No	(Note: A play for children. Reissued by Patterson in 1913, and again in 1920.)
3	Four Recitations	Patterson, Edinburgh	1903			No	(Note: Listed by Daniel Kirkpatrick as a play, but may just be recitations.)
4	The Enchanted Fiddle	Patterson, Edinburgh	1903		22 p., 8º	No	(Note: A play for children.)
5	The Wishing Princess	Patterson, Edinburgh	1904		24 p., 8º	No	(Note: A play for children. Reissued by Patterson in 1913.)
6	A Terrible Tomboy	Gay and Bird, London	1904	Angela Brazil and Amy Brazil	[2], 284 p., col. Ill., 8º	Yes	(Note: Not a school story, although some of the action takes place in school. First edition was illustrated in colour by the Brazil sisters. A new edition in 1915 (Henry Frowde, Hodder, and Stoughton) was illustrated in colour by N. Tenison.)
7	The Fortunes of Philippa	Blackie, London	1906	Arthur A. Dixon	208 p., 8º	Yes	(Note: Based on the experiences of Brazil's mother when she first came to England from South America. Written before A Terrible Tomboy but not published until 1906.)
8	The Third Class at Miss Kayes	Blackie, London	1909	Arthur A. Dixon	208 p., 8º	Yes	
9	The Nicest Girl in the School	Blackie, London	1910	Arthur A. Dixon	256 p., 8º	Yes	(Note: Her most popular book, which sold 153,000 copies.)
10	Our School Record	Dow & Lester, London	1909			No	(Note: Not a school story. No Jisc or WorldCat entries found. Gay and Bird were a stationers and publishers that typically published small novelty items, typically for games or for recording something, such as left handed autographs, vehicle log books etc. They even published the Thumb o'Graphs a book with a single page of text, an ink pad attached to the covers, and one page of instructions for taken the impressions of the thumbs of your friends and acquaintances on the many blank pages. This item formed the centre-piece for R. Austin Freeman's Red Thumb Mark. The English Catalogue of Books records that Dow & Lester published My School Record, a small (16º) book in September 1909, priced at one shilling, with no author given. Judging by their other products, this was probably set out in sections for recording the purchaser's life in school, possibly with some encouraging words from Brazil.)
11	Bosom Friends	Nelson, London	1910	Jennie Wylie	253 p., 8º	Yes	(Note: Not a school story, but based at the seaside.)
12	The Manor House School	Blackie, London	1911	Arthur A. Dixon	256 p., 8º	Yes	
13	A Fourth Form Friendship	Blackie, London	1912	Frank E. Wiles	255, [1] p., 5pl., 8º	Yes	
14	The New Girl at St Chad's	Blackie, London	1912	John W. Campbell	288 p., 8º	Yes	
15	A Pair of Schoolgirls	Blackie, London	1912	John W. Campbell	256 p., pl., ill., 8º	Yes	
16	The Leader of the Lower School	Blackie, London	1914	John W. Campbell	256 p., 8º	Yes	
17	The Youngest Girl in the Fifth	Blackie, London	1914	Stanley Davis	296 p., 8º	Yes	
18	The Girls of St Cyprian's	Blackie, London	1914	Stanley Davis	288 p., 6 pl., 8º	Yes	(Note: Linked to the Merle pair of stories.)
19	The School by the Sea	Blackie, London	1914	John W. Cambell	256 p., 8º	Yes	(Note: Sims and Clare provisionally give the illustrator as Treyer Davis, but Robert Kirkpatrick lists this as one of four Brazil books illustrated by John W. Campbell.)
20	For the Sake of the School	Blackie, London	1915	Stanley Davis	264p., 5 pl., ill. (1 col.), 8º	Yes	
21	The Jolliest Term on Record	Blackie, London	1915	Balliol Salmon	288 p., 8º	Yes	
22	The Luckiest Girl in the School	Blackie, London	1916	Balliol Salmon	296 p., 6 ill., 8º	Yes	
23	The Madcap of the School	Blackie, London	1917	Balliol Salmon	288 p., 8º	Yes	
24	The Slap-Bang Boys	Nelson, London	1917	George Morrow	32 p., 8º	No	(Note: Not a school story, Cooper and Cooper give the illustrator as George Morrow.)
25	A Patriotic Schoolgirl	Blackie, London	1918	Balliol Salmon	288 p., 6 ill., 8º	Yes	
26	For the School Colours	Blackie, London	1918	Balliol Salmon	288 p., 8º	Yes	
27	The Language of Flowers	Oxford, Oxford	1919			No	(Note: Not a school story. Not listed in the Jisc catalogue. Not listed in the English Catalogue of Books for 1919, although three other new books and one reissue by Brazil are listed.)
28	The Treasure of the Woods	Oxford, Oxford	1919			No	(Note: Not a school story. Not listed in the Jisc catalogue. Not listed in the English Catalogue of Books for 1919, although three other new books and one reissue by Brazil are listed.)
29	A Harum-Scarum Schoolgirl	Blackie, London	1919	John W. Campbell	288 p., 8º	Yes	
30	The Head Girl at the Gables	Blackie, London	1919	Balliol Salmon	288 p., 6 ill., 8º	Yes	(Note: Linked to the Merle pair of stories.)
31	Two Little Scamps and a Puppy	Nelson, London	1919	E Blampied	63 p., 8º	No	(Note: Not a school story.)
32	A Popular Schoolgirl	Blackie, London	1920	Balliol Salmon	288 p., 5 ill., 8º	Yes	
33	A Gift from the Sea	Nelson, London	1920	A. E. Jackson	64 p., 8º	No	(Note: Not a school story. Tells the story of a small girl who is washed ashore after her ship is torpedoed. Appeared first in a Nelson anthology The Chummy Book in 1918, and later as a separate volume.)
34	The Princess of the School	Blackie, London	1920	Frank E. Wiles	288 p., 8º	Yes	
35	Loyal to the School	Blackie, London	1921	Treyer Evans	288 p., 8º	Yes	
36	A Fortunate Term	Blackie, London	1921	Treyer Evans	288 p., 5 ill., 8º	Yes	(Note: First part of the Merle pair of stories.)
37	Monitress Merle	Blackie, London	1922	Treyer Evans	256 p., 6 ill., 8º	Yes	(Note: Second part of the Merle pair of stories.)
38	The School in the South	Blackie, London	1922	W. Smithson Broadhead	287 p., 8º	Yes	(Note: School in the South and linked works. Published in the US as The Jolliest School of All, (1923, Stokes, New York).)
39	Schoolgirl Kitty	Blackie, London	1923	W. E. Wightman	320 p., 8º	No	
40	The Khaki Boys and other stories	Nelson, London	1923			No	(Note: Short Stories, not set in school. The Khaki Boys first appeared in Nelson's anthology The Jolly Book in 1918.)
41	Captain Peggie	Blackie, London	1924	W. E. Wightman	319 p., 8º	No	
42	My Own Schooldays	Blackie, London	1925	Photograph	[2],[5]-320p., 4 ill., 8º	No	(Note: Brazil's autobiography.)
43	Joan's Best Chum	Blackie, London	1926	W. E. Wightman	320 p., 6 ill., 8º	No	(Note: Linked to School in the South.)
44	Queen of the Dormitory etc.	Cassell, London	1926	P. B. Hickling	217 p., 8º	No	(Note: Short stories set in school.)
45	Ruth of St Ronan's	Blackie, London	1927	Frank Oldham	320 p., 8º	No	
46	At School with Rachel	Blackie, London	1928	W. E. Wightman	320 p., 8º	No	(Note: First part of the Rachel pair of stories.)
47	St. Catherine's College	Blackie, London	1929	Frank E. Wiles	320 p., 4 ill., 8º	No	(Note: Second part of the Rachel pair of stories.)
48	The Little Green School	Blackie, London	1931	Frank E. Wiles	320 p., 8º	No	(Note: First part of the Little Green School pair of stories.)
49	Nesta's New School	Blackie, London	1932	W. Spence	319 p., 8º	No	(Note: Reissued as Amanda's New School, Armada, 1970.)
50	Jean's Golden Term	Blackie, London	1934	Frank E. Wiles	256 p., 8º	No	(Note: Second part of the Little Green School pair of stories.)
51	The School at the Turrets	Blackie, London	1935	Francis E. Hiley	255 p., 8º	No	
52	An Exciting Term	Blackie, London	1936	Francis E. Hiley	255 p., 8º	No	
53	Jill's Joiliest School	Blackie, London	1937	Francis E. Hiley	272 p., 8º	No	
54	The School on the Cliff	Blackie, London	1938	Francis E. Hiley	272 p., 8º	No	
55	The School on the Moor	Blackie, London	1939	H. Coller	256 p., 4 ill., 8º	No	
56	The New School at Scawdale	Blackie, London	1940	M. Mackinlav	272 p., 4 ill., 8º	No	
57	Five Jolly Schoolgirls	Blackie, London	1941	W. Lindsay Cable	252 p., 8º	No	
58	The Mystery of the Moated Grange	Blackie, London	1942	W. Lindsay Cable	271 p., 8º	No	
59	The Secret of the Border Castle	Blackie, London	1943	Charles Willis	256 p., 4 ill., 8º	No	
60	The School in the Forest	Blackie, London	1944	J. Dewar Mills	288 p., 4 ill., 8º	No	
61	Three Terms at Uplands	Blackie, London	1945	D. L. Mays	223 p., ill., 8º	No	
62	The School on the Loch	Blackie, London	1946	W. Lindsay Cable	240 p., 4 ill. 8º	No	

== Example of illustration ==
The following illustrations (a colour frontispiece and four black and white illustrations) were prepared by Arthur A(ugustus) Dixon (8 May 1872 – 30 May 1959) (Note: Dixon was a prolific English book illustrator. He illustrated four Brazil stories for Blackie and Son and another two by Elsie J. Oxenham. Horne calls his illustrations conventional and unexceptional, Peppin says that his book illustrations were mainly in full colour or half tone and that they were conventional and prosaic with sentimental overtones, but generally competent.) for Brazil's most popular story The Nicest Girl in the School (1909).

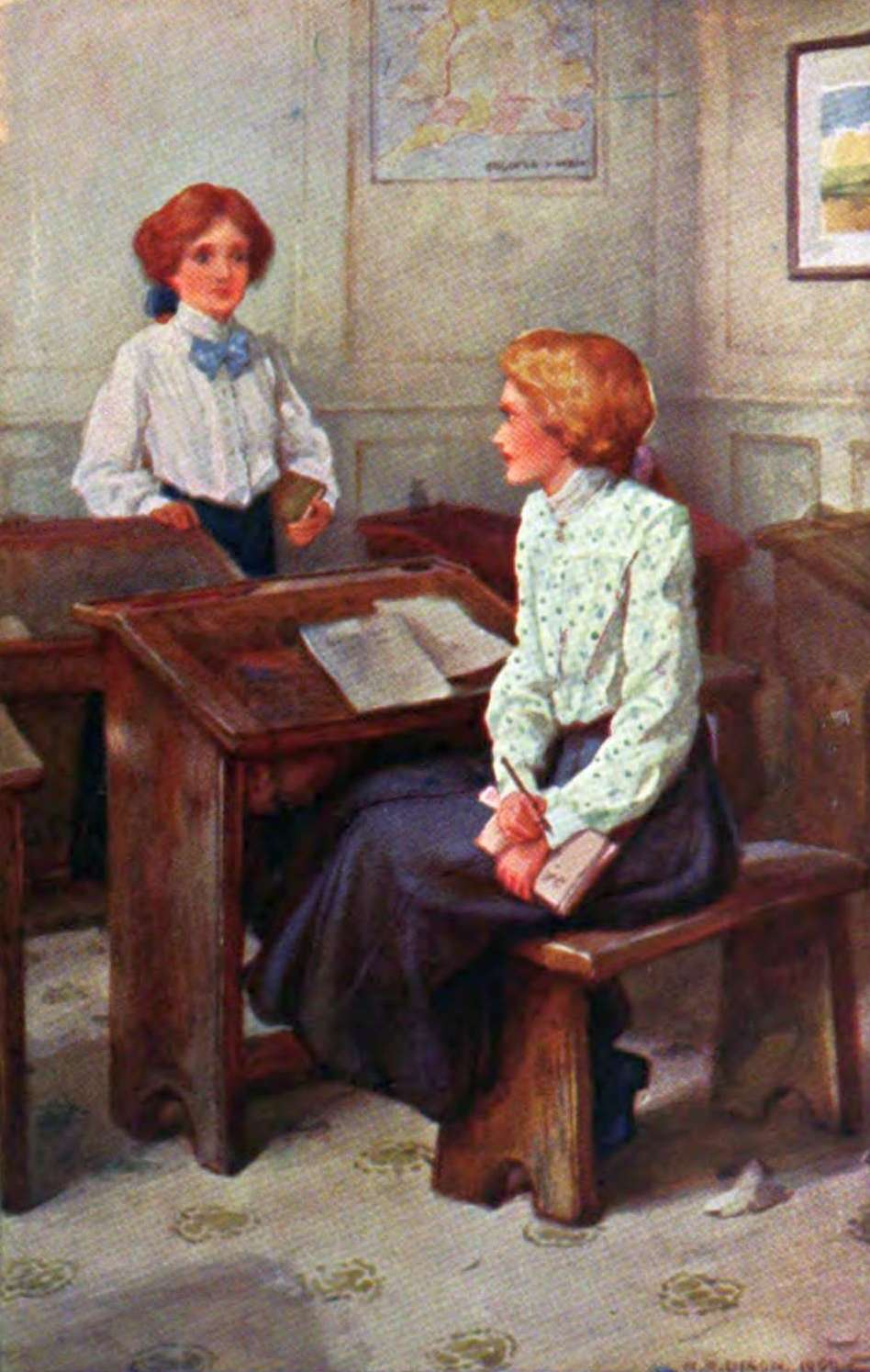
Guilt

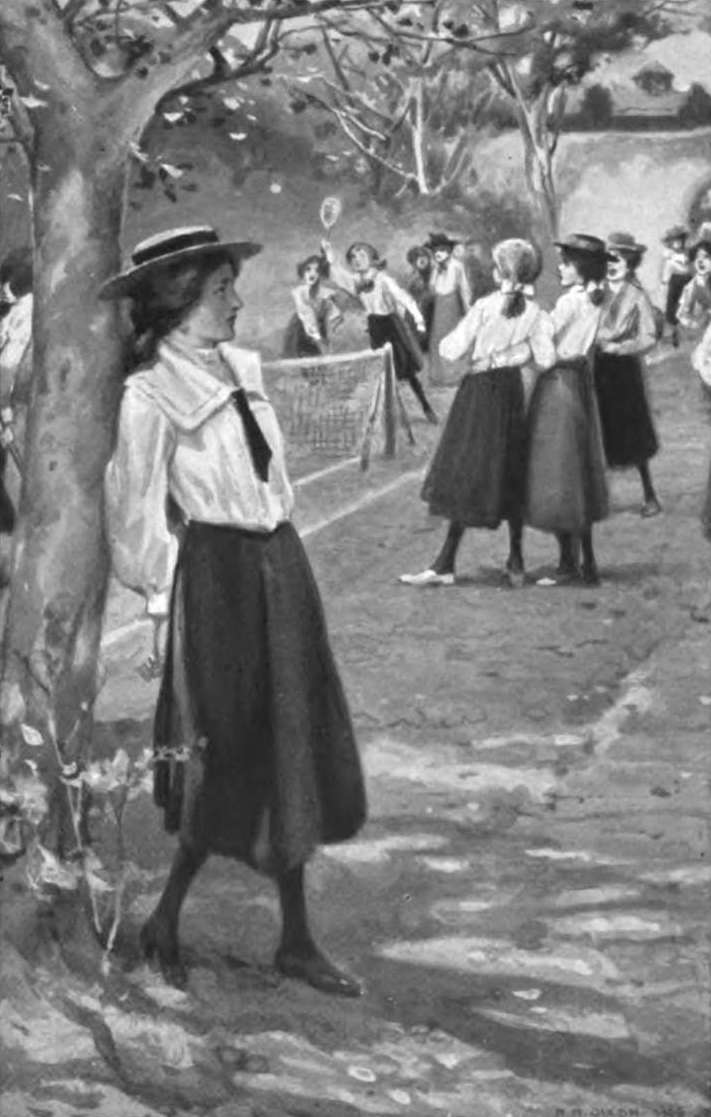
Isolation

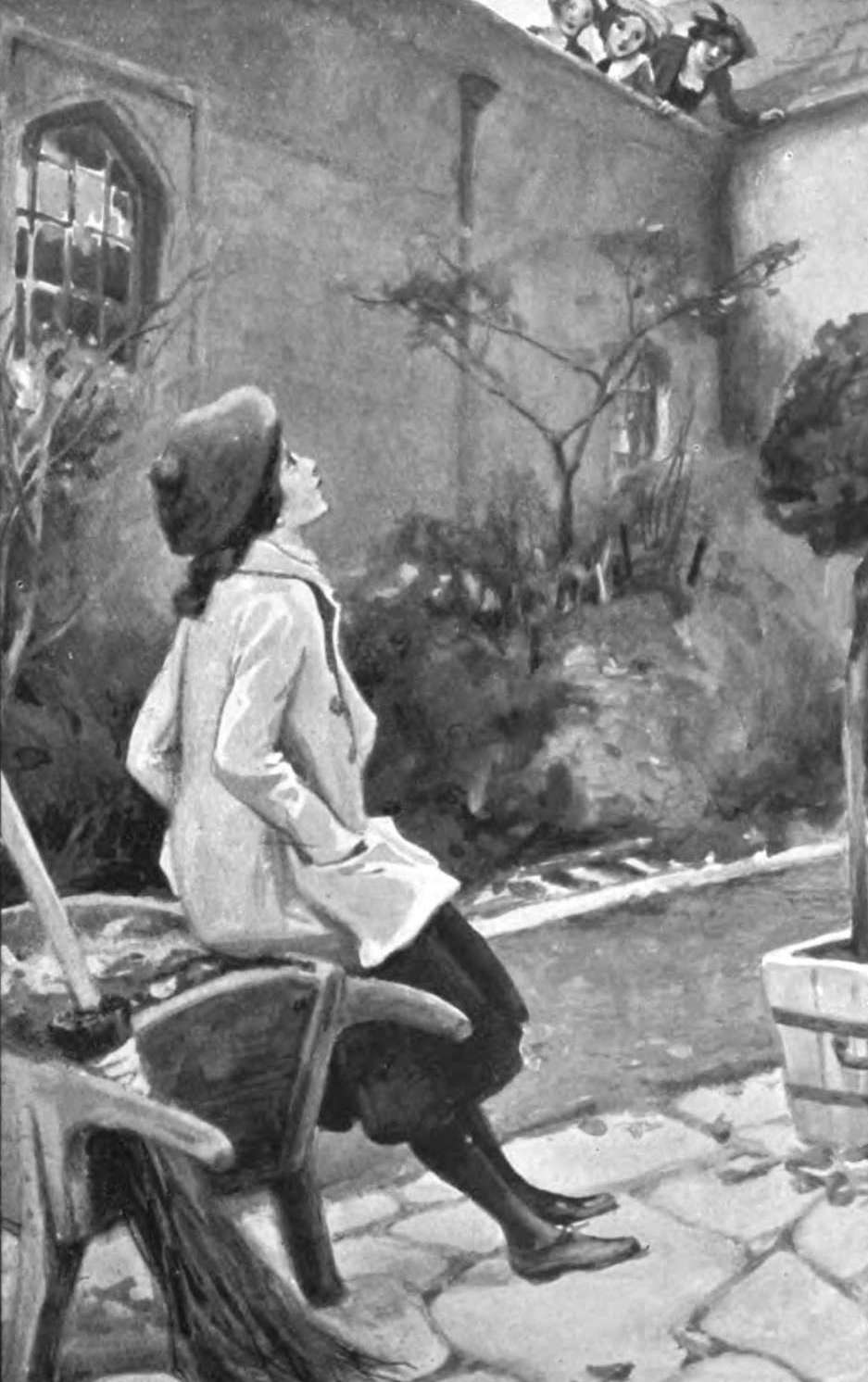
Appeal

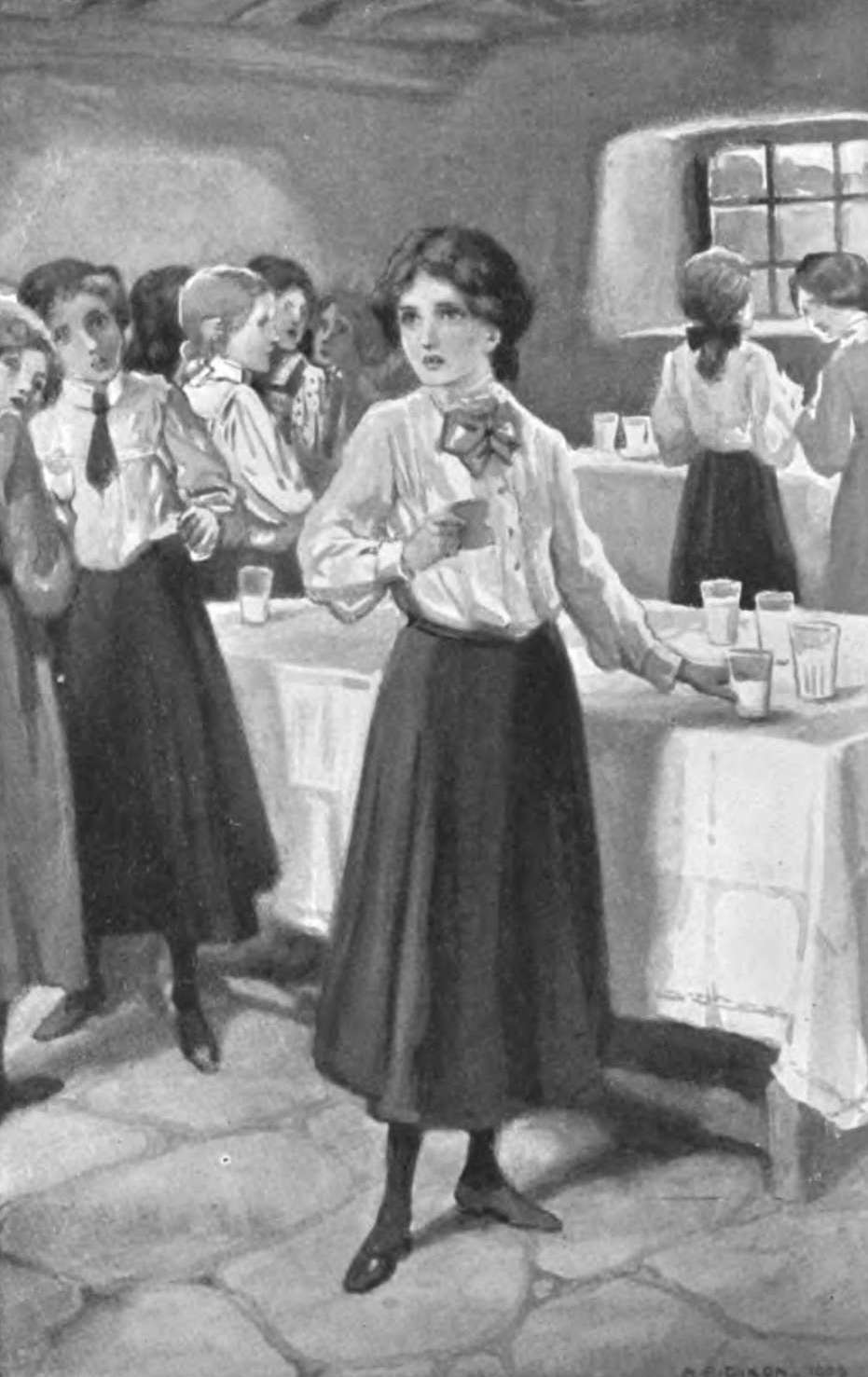
Suspected

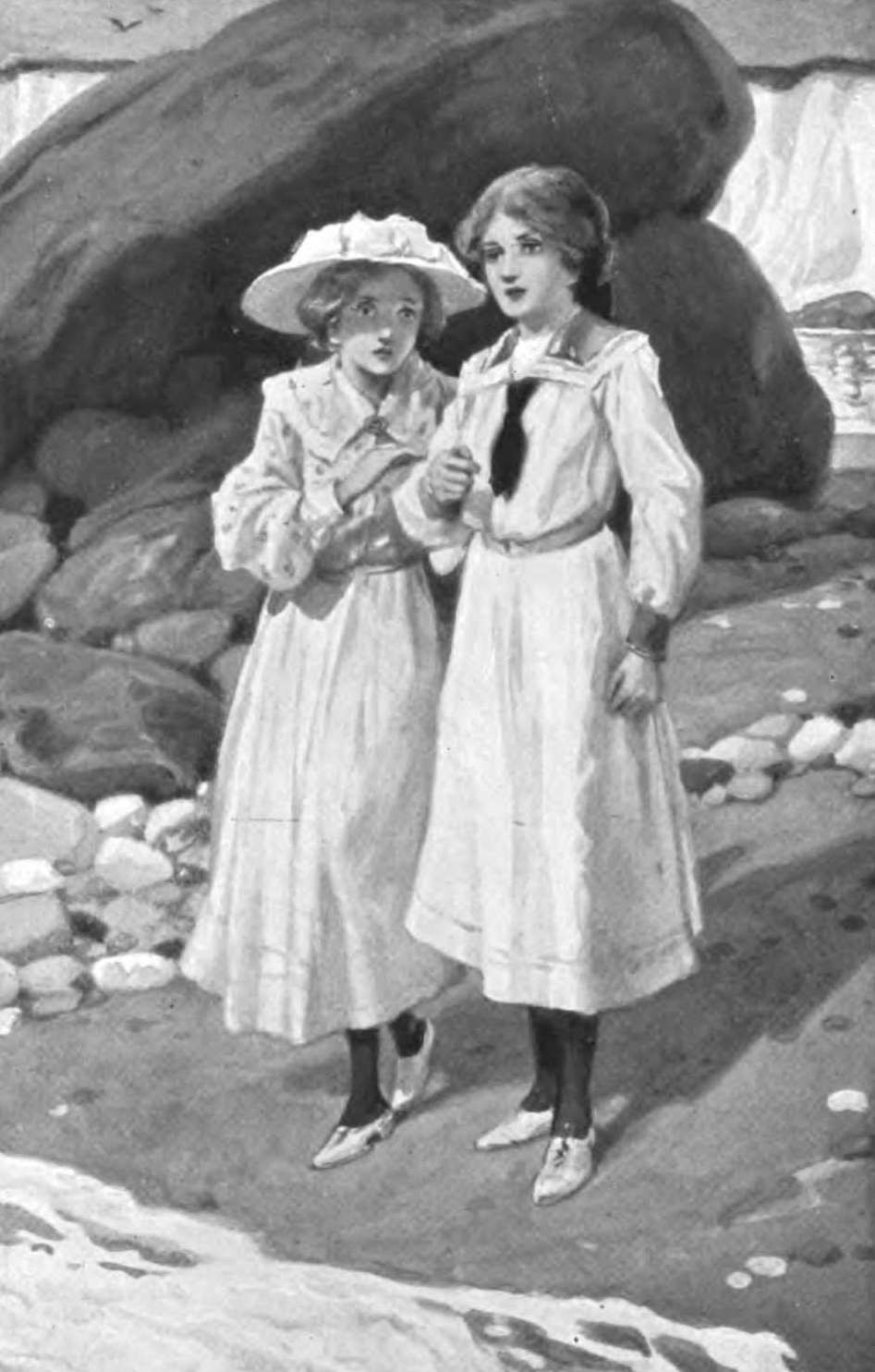
Cut off by tide

== Natural History records ==
Brazil was interested and knowledgeable about natural history. She was part of a field studies group in Wales with her sister, and also recorded what she saw on walks around Coventry. Over two decades she made detailed notes about plants, birds and animals she had seen as well as some watercolour paintings for her personal records. These are now housed at the Herbert Art Gallery and Museum in Coventry. Some of the watercolours were included in the UnNatural History exhibition as part of Coventry UK City of Culture in 2021.

== See also ==
- The Chalet School series by Elinor Brent-Dyer
- The Melling School series by Margaret Biggs
- The Abbey Series, Abbey Connectors and other series of books about schoolgirls by Elsie J. Oxenham
- School story
- Pony books, often featuring and aimed at teen girls

== Sources ==
- My Own Schooldays. Angela Brazil, 1926.
- The Schoolgirl Ethic: The Life and Work of Angela Brazil. Gillian Freeman, 1976
- You're a Brick, Angela! A New Look at Girls’ Fiction from 1839 to 1975. Mary Cadogan and Patricia Craig, Gollancz, London, 1976.
- Shropshire-cc.gov.uk accessed 10 January 2006 (UTC)
- Collectingbooksandmagazines.com accessed 10 January 2006 (UTC)
