= Simey =

Simey is a surname. Notable people with the surname include:

- Cyril Simey (1905–1952), British fencer
- Margaret Simey (1906–2004), Scottish political and social campaigner
- Thomas Simey, Baron Simey (1906–1969), British academic and life peer

== See also ==
- Simen
