= A J Balliol Salmon =

British artist

A. J. Balliol Salmon
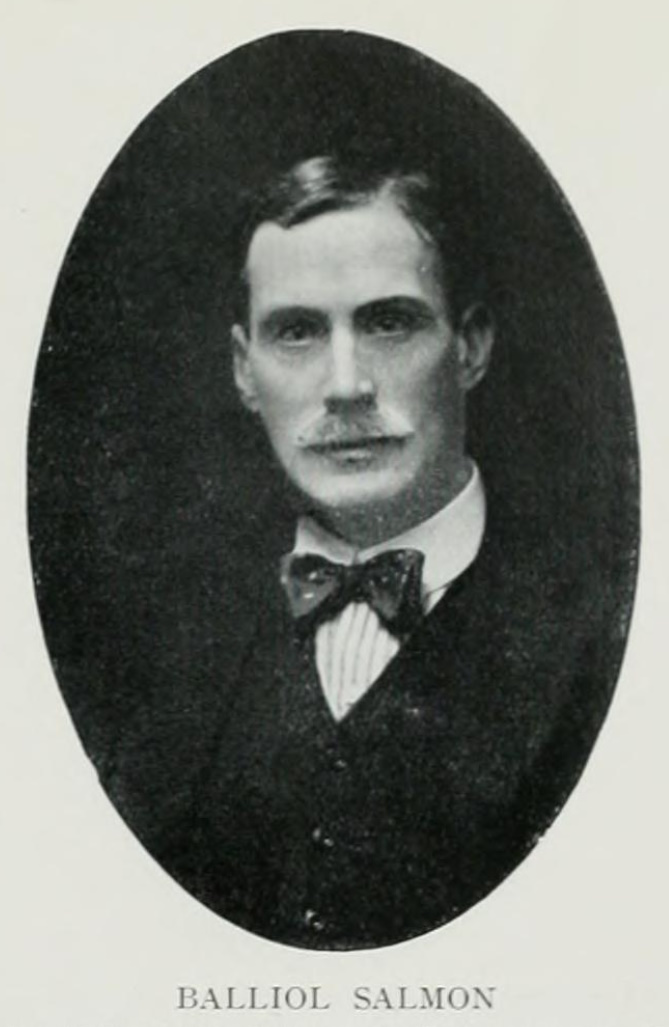
- Balliol Salmon, photographed in about 1922.
- Born: Arthur John Balliol Salmon; 1 June 1868; Manchester, Lancashire, England
- Died: January 3, 1953 (aged 84); Northiam, East Sussex, England
- Education: Westminster School of Art; Academie Julian
- Known for: Watercolourist, pastellist, draughtsman, illustrator

Arthur John Balliol Salmon (Note: Some sources given his name as J. M. Balliol Salmon. However, Kirkpatrick states that his birth certificate gives his name as Arthur John Balliol Salmon. His entry for the 1911 census given his name as Arthur John Balliol Salmon. The 1939 register gives his name as Arthur J. B. Salmon. Benezit not only gives his name as J. M. Balliol Salmon, but incorrectly treats Balliol Salmon as his surname. Who Was Who, Peppin, Kirkpatrick,, the 1939 Register and the electoral registers all give his surname as Salmon.) (1868 – 1953) was a British artist particularly noted for his illustrations and his work in pencil, chalk and pastels. He was one of the twenty leading illustrators selected by Percy V. Bradshaw for inclusion in his Art of the Illustrator. (Note: This was a series of portfolios showing the work of twenty leading illustrators. The Jisc catalogue shows the portfolios being issued from 1915 to 1920, and some of these issues may have been reissues. A review in The Connoisseur: An Illustrated Magazine for Collectors in August 1918 lists four artists (W. Russell Flint, Dudley Hardy, C. A. Shepperson, and Lawson Wood) as being in the first folios issued. The set of twenty portfolios cost £7. 7s. or £8. 8s. if purchased in monthly installments. Each of the twenty portfolios deal with the personality and working methods of a leading illustrator. Each contained: a biography of the illustrator; an illustration of the illustrator at work in their studio; an explanation by the illustrator of their methods of working; an illustration typical of the artist's work; six plates showing the work at six stages of its production, from the first pencil rough to the finished drawing or colour sketch.)

== Biography ==
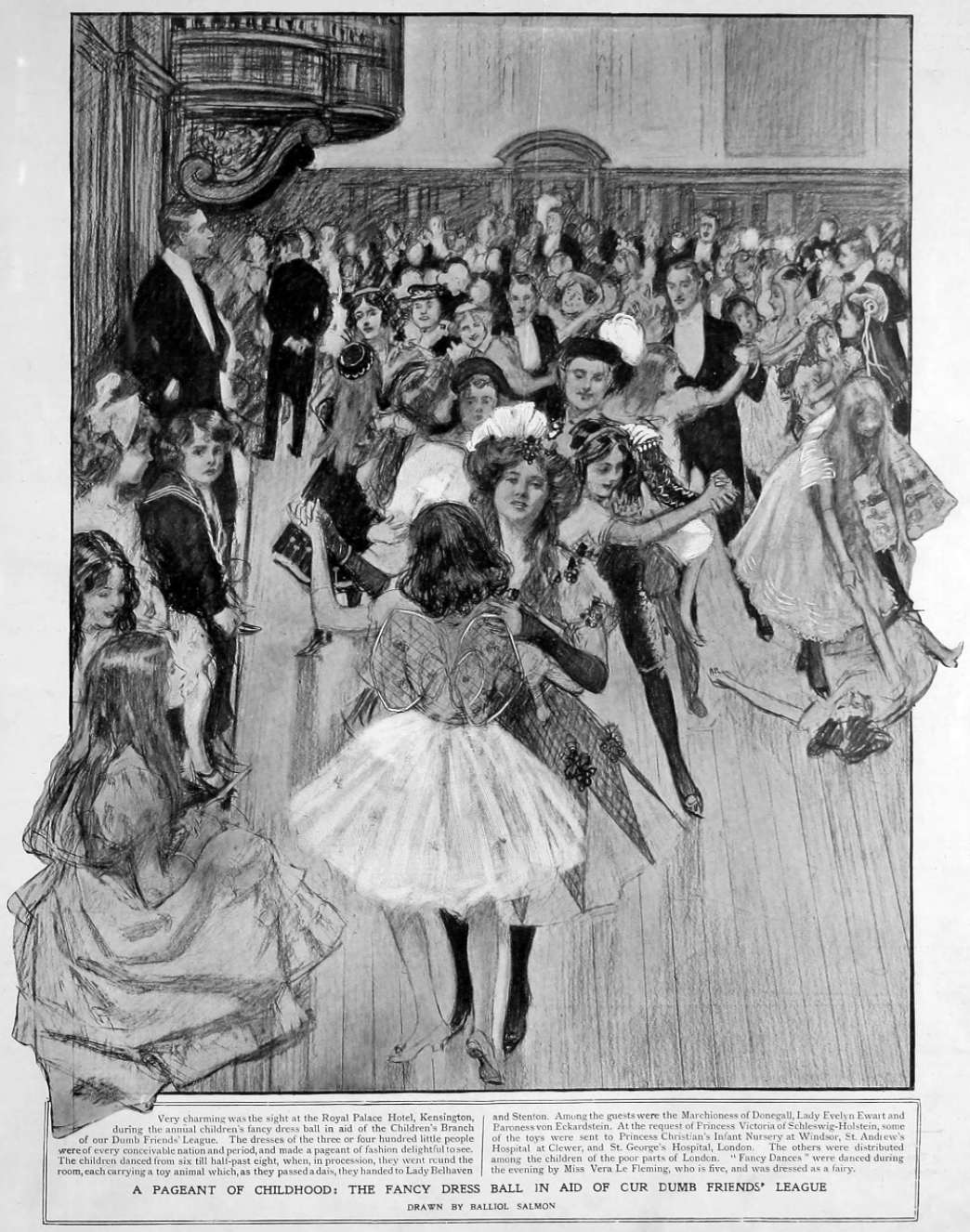
Fancy Dress Ball at the Royal Palace Hotel, Kensington, in aid of Our Dumb Friend's League.

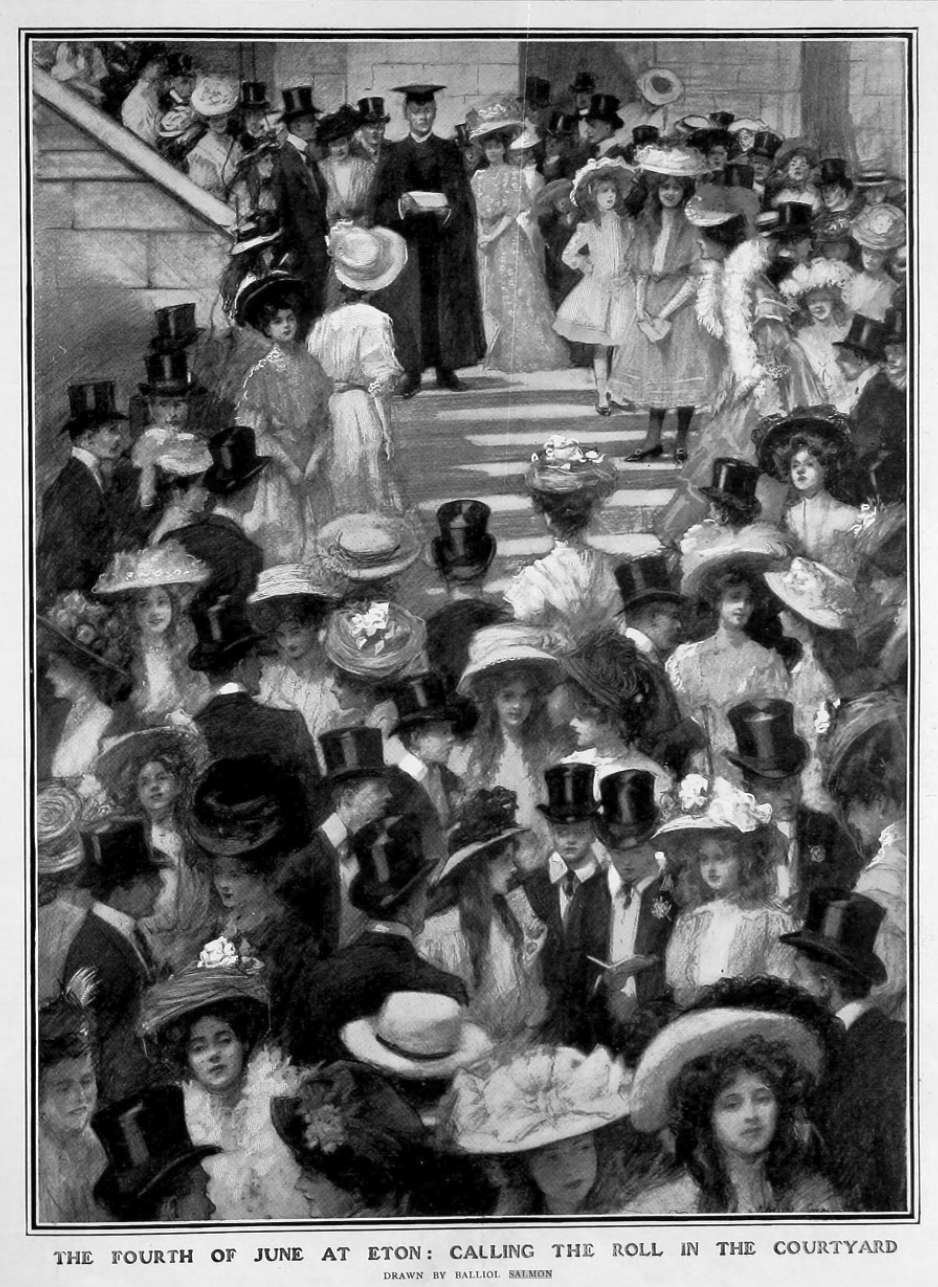
Calling the roll in the courtyard at Eton on the "Fourth of June" 1907.

Arthur John Balliol Salmon was born in Manchester, Lancashire, England on 1 June 1868. He was the son of Henry Curwen Salmon and Ellen Fennell, who had married on 6 May 1857. (Note: It is not completely clear what Henry Curwen's profession was. Kirkpatrick says that he was a civil engineer and not a surgeon and barrister as some sources suggest. The 1859 Kentish Gazette notice of Henry Curwen's involvency listed him as a Law Student and Speculator in Mines, a Geological Writer and Surveyor, Speculator in Mining Shares and Mining Agent. Henry Curwen described himself as an engineer and smelter in the 1861 census. Henry Curwen was the editor of The Mining and Smelting Magazine in 1862 His editorship was listed in his obituary when he died in 1873. Who Was Who give him as a barrister and notes that he was a F. C. S. and a F. G. S.)

Balliol Salmon studied for a year under Fred Brown at the Westminster School, where his fellow pupils were F. H. Townsend and Fred Pegram. Salmon continued his training, together with Fred Pegram at Paris ateliers. He trained at the Academie Julian in Paris. He lived in Glasgow and London.

He pursued a career as teacher and illustrator, notably for The Graphic. Houfe wrote in his Dictionary of Nineteenth-Century British Book Illustrators and Caricaturists (1996) that Balliol Salmon was one of the best pencil and chalk artists to work for the press in the Edwardian era.

Balliol Salmon was chosen by art instructor Percy V. Bradshaw as one of the artists to illustrate "The Art of the Illustrator", the seminal collection of twenty portfolios demonstrating six stages of a single painting or drawing by twenty different artists and published in 1918.

== Selected illustrations ==
- Sir Cosmo Duff-Gordon At The British Wreck Commissioner's Inquiry Into The Titanic Disaster - Illustrated London News, 25 May 1912 (Gouache)
- Love Letter, 1908 Ink, watercolour and gouache
- Portrait of Joan Bright.
- Portrait of Ada Reeve on board White Star RMS Majestic 1911

== Book illustrations for the series of books by Angela Brazil ==
Salmon was Angela Brazil's favourite among her illustrators with his lovely elongated schoolgirls. He illustrated seven of her books in the UK. Different illustrators were used for different markets. Freeman states that Salmon's illustrations were jettisoned for comic cartoons in France and winsomeness in America.

In the following list PG indicates whether the book is available on Project Gutenberg. The list is based on searches on Jisc library hub discover, (Note: The Jisc Library Hub Discover brings together the catalogues of 165 Major UK and Irish libraries. Additional libraries are being added all the time, and the catalogue collates national, university, and research libraries.) checked against the bibliography in Sims and Clare's Encyclopedia of Girls' School Stories.

Books by Angela Brazil and illustrated by Salmon
No	Title	Published	Year	Pages (from Jisc)	On PG
1	The Jolliest Term on Record	Blackie, London	1915	288 p., 8º	Yes
2	The Luckiest Girl in the School	Blackie, London	1916	296 p., 6 ill., 8º	Yes
3	The Madcap of the School	Blackie, London	1917	288 p., 8º	Yes
4	A Patriotic Schoolgirl	Blackie, London	1918	288 p., 6 ill., 8º	Yes
5	For the School Colours	Blackie, London	1918	288 p., 8º	Yes
6	The Head Girl at the Gables	Blackie, London	1919	288 p., 6 ill., 8º	Yes
7	A Popular Schoolgirl	Blackie, London	1920	288 p., 5 ill., 8º	Yes
