= Cleeve Abbey =

Medieval monastery in Somerset, England

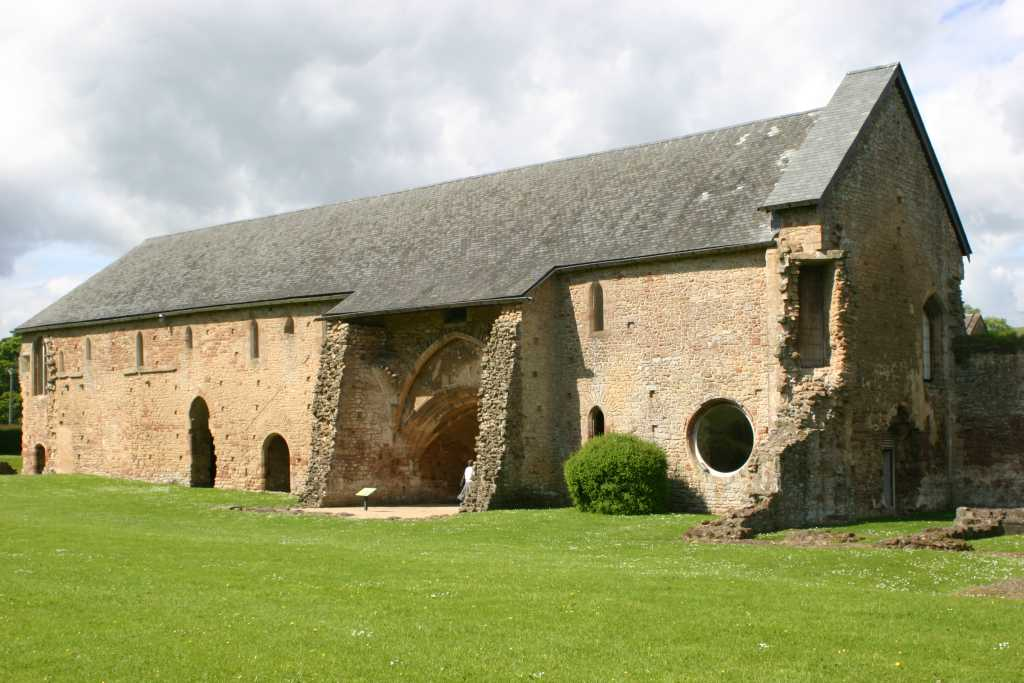
- The Dormitory at Cleeve Abbey, viewed from the North-East
- Interactive map of Cleeve Abbey

Monastery information
- Full name: The Abbey Church of St Mary, Cleeve, Vallis Florida (Latin: 'Flowering Valley')
- Order: Cistercian
- Established: 1198
- Disestablished: 1537
- Mother house: Revesby Abbey
- Dedication: Virgin Mary
- Diocese: Bath and Wells
- Controlled churches: Cleeve, Queen Camel, Woolavington and the chapel of Our Lady at Blue Anchor

People
- Founder: William de Roumare, Earl of Lincoln
- Important associated figures: John Hooper

Site
- Location: Washford, Somerset, England
- Coordinates: 51°9′20″N 3°21′51″W
- Visible remains: complete cloister buildings in habitable state, church and infirmary are missing
- Public access: yes (English Heritage)

Cleeve Abbey is a medieval monastery located near the Washford River and village of Washford, in the English county of Somerset. It is a Grade I listed building and has been scheduled as an ancient monument.

The abbey was founded in the late twelfth century as a house for monks of the austere Cistercian order. Over its 350-year monastic history Cleeve was undistinguished amongst the abbeys of its order, frequently ill-governed and often financially troubled. The sole member of the community to achieve some degree of historical prominence was John Hooper, a man with an obscure personal history who became a Calvinist, was appointed Anglican Bishop of Gloucester but met his end executed for heresy under Queen Mary I.

In 1536 Cleeve was closed by Henry VIII in the course of the Dissolution of the Monasteries and the abbey was converted into a country house. Subsequently, the status of the site declined and the abbey was used as farm buildings until the latter half of the nineteenth century when steps were taken to conserve the remains. In the twentieth century Cleeve was taken into state care; the abbey is now looked after by English Heritage and is open to the public. Today Cleeve Abbey is one of the best-preserved medieval Cistercian monastic sites in Britain. While the church is no longer standing, the conventual buildings are still roofed and habitable and contain many features of particular interest including the 'angel' roof in the refectory and the wall paintings in the painted chamber.

== Foundation ==
The abbey was founded by William de Roumare, Earl of Lincoln. On 25 June 1198 a colony of 12 monks led by Abbot Ralph arrived at the site from Revesby Abbey in Lincolnshire. The official name of the abbey was Vallis Florida (Latin: 'Flowering Valley'), but throughout its history it was generally known as Cleeve after the nearby village. The initial funding for the foundation was increased by land and money from the family of William de Mohun of Dunster, 1st Earl of Somerset and the Beckerolles family. In addition to various landholdings with produced rent for the abbey they held the Right of Wreck, which meant they could claim shipwrecks washed up on the shore of their lands.

== Abbey buildings ==
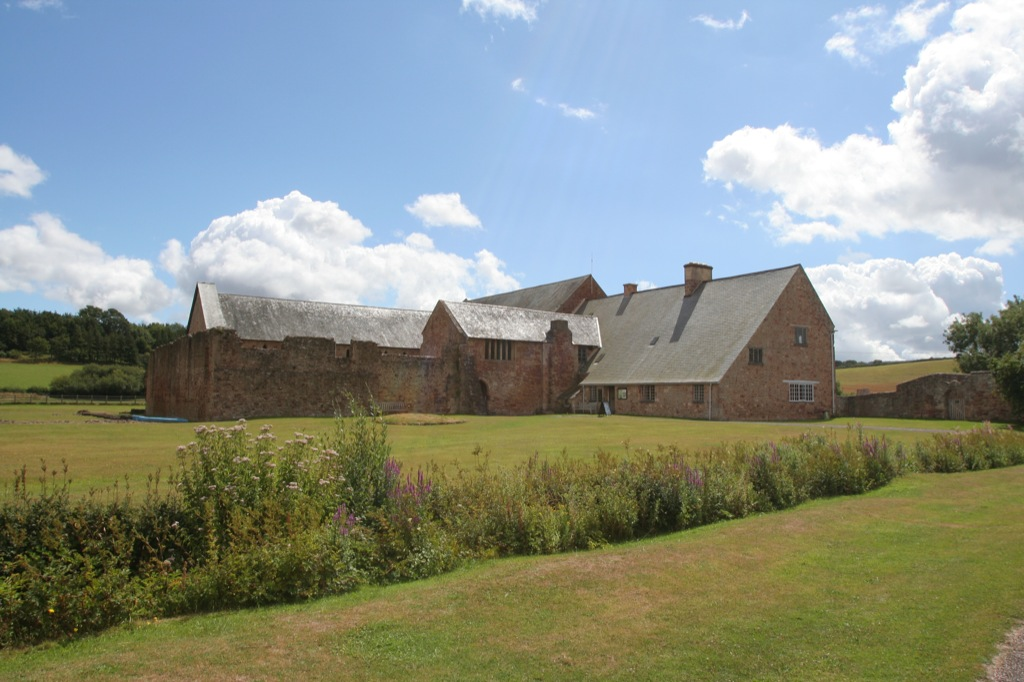
View of Cleeve Abbey from the North-West

Work immediately began on constructing the abbey church, a task that took many decades. It was a conservative design, heavily influenced by the thoughts of St. Bernard and the order's early churches in its homeland of Burgundy. It was cruciform in shape with an aisled nave of seven bays, a short, square east end, and transepts each with two side chapels. The eastern parts of the church were built first, and were likely finished in 1232, at which point the abbey received a royal donation of oak to build choir stalls. The remainder was probably completed by mid-century.

To the south of the church a cloister was laid out, surrounded by the domestic buildings of the house. The east range, which was completed first (probably by around 1250), held the chapter house, sacristy, the monks' dormitory, day room, and a 19.7 metres (65 ft) long reredorter (latrine). The south range was built next, it contained the kitchens, warming house and refectory which projected south beyond the main body of the building, following the usual Cistercian plan.

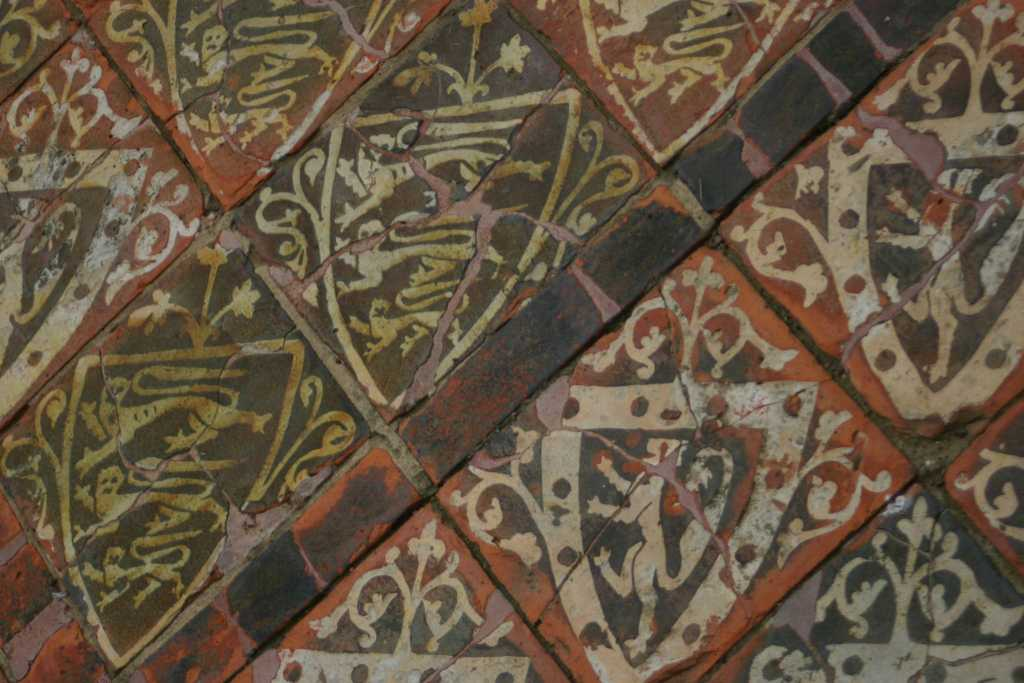
Expensive heraldic tiles demonstrate rising living standards at Cleeve in the latter part of the Middle Ages.

It is suggested from the heraldry used in the tiled floors of the refectory that it was finished at the end of the thirteenth century. The encaustic tiles, which are 23 centimetres (9.1 in) square, include the arms of Henry III, Richard, 1st Earl of Cornwall and the Clare family. It is believed they were produced to celebrate the marriage of Edmund, 2nd Earl of Cornwall and Margaret de Clare in 1272. The final part to be finished was the small west range, which was used for storage and quarters for the lay brothers. East of the core buildings, and linked to them, was a second cloister around which was the monastic infirmary.

The monastery, which is next to the Washford River, would have been surrounded by gardens, fishponds, orchards, barns, guesthouses, stables, a farmyard and industrial buildings. The abbey grounds were defended by a water filled moat and a gatehouse. Excavation has revealed that a large stone cross, like a market cross, stood just west of the main building.

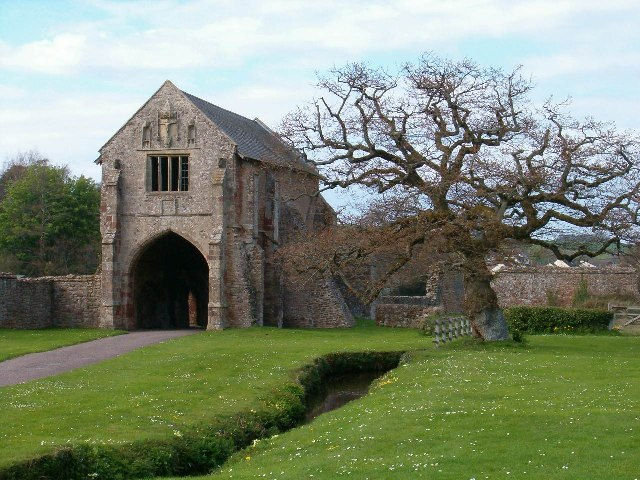
The abbey gatehouse

Though Cleeve was by no means a wealthy house, the monks were able to make significant investment in remodelling their home so as to match the rising living standards of the later mediaeval period. In the fourteenth-century elaborate polychrome tiled floors (an expensive and high status product) were laid throughout the abbey and in the mid-fifteenth century radical works were undertaken. A wooden shelter was constructed over the tiled floor in 2016. Abbot David Juyner (r. 1435–87) commissioned a complete redesign of the south range of the monastery. He demolished the old refectory and built a new one parallel to the cloister on the first floor. This grand chamber with its wooden vaulted ceiling (carved with angels) was the equal of the hall of any contemporary secular lord. Beneath it he built several self-contained apartments. These were probably used by corrodians, pensioners of the abbey. Juyner may also have been responsible for decorating the abbey with wall paintings of religious and allegorical subjects. Some of these wall paintings survive. As well as one depicting the Crucifixion, there is an arrangement of St Catherine and St Margaret on either side of, and facing, a man standing on a bridge: the bridge is over water full of fish, and the man has an angel on either side of his head, and is being attacked by a lion to his left on the bridge, and a dragon to his right. Work continued under Juyner's successors to the eve of the Dissolution. The last building work to be completed was the remodelling of the gatehouse, performed after 1510, though as late as 1534 the monks were engaged in a major project of renewing the cloister walks in the latest fashion. As at the neighbouring house of Forde Abbey, this was never completed, due to the dissolution of the abbey.

== Monastic history ==
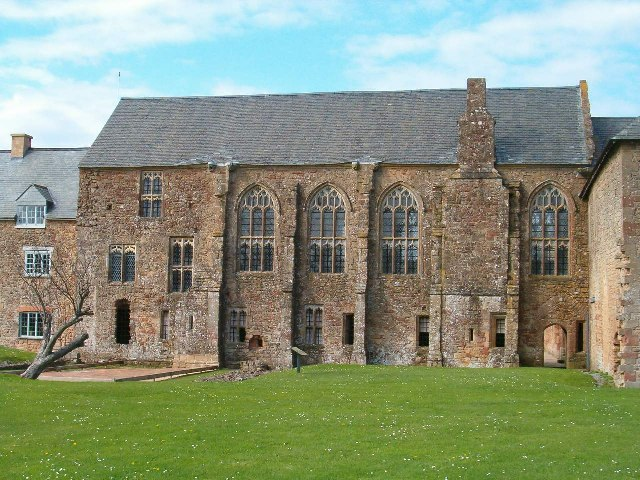
The refectory range was rebuilt in the 15th century to provide accommodation equal to that possessed by any contemporary secular lord.

Like most of the smaller Cistercian houses, comparatively little is known about the internal history of the abbey. In its early years Cleeve received grants of land and property from local lords and the Crown to supplement its initial endowment and in the prosperous years of the thirteenth century grew steadily, reaching 26 monks in 1297. The abbey held various local churches, including those at Cleeve, Queen Camel, Woolavington while also holding the rectory of Lundy. The abbey was also responsible for the chapel of Our Lady between Old Cleeve and what is now Blue Anchor; however although this has since disappeared, the inn for pilgrims attending the chapel has been expanded into the present Chapel Cleeve Manor.

A major source of income was the export of wool. However, the fourteenth century saw a change in fortunes: the Black Death, a worsening economic climate and poor administration left the abbey (like many others of its order) with sharply declining numbers of monks and saddled with major debt. The internal discipline and morals of the community declined too: in 1400–01 it was reported to the government that the abbot of Cleeve and three other monks were leading a group of 200 bandits and attacking travellers in the region. However, things improved in the fifteenth century and despite the vast expense caused by the extravagant building projects of the last abbots, better management, access to new resources (for instance from the profits from the right to hold markets granted by the crown) and a general improvement in the circumstances facing the house meant that just prior to the dissolution Cleeve was enjoying an Indian Summer of comfortable stability.

== Dissolution ==
In 1535, the abbey's income was only assessed at £155 in the Valor Ecclesiasticus, Henry VIII's great survey of church finances. It meant the following year that it came under the terms of the first Suppression Act, Henry's initial move in the Dissolution of the Monasteries. Abbot William Dovell and his 16 monks were forced to surrender the abbey on 6 September 1536. There were proposals from local gentry and even some of the king's officials for the Dissolution such as Sir Thomas Arundell that Cleeve should be granted a reprieve, as a number of others among the smaller monasteries were, however, it was not to be and the monks finally left in the spring of 1537. Abbot William was given a pension of 40 marks per year, not large but certainly comfortable, which he was still drawing 20 years later. Most of the other monks were given pensions too. One former monk of Cleeve rose to prominence and came to a sticky end. This was John Hooper who became Bishop of Gloucester and Worcester and was killed in 1555 for his Protestant beliefs by Mary I.

== Later history ==
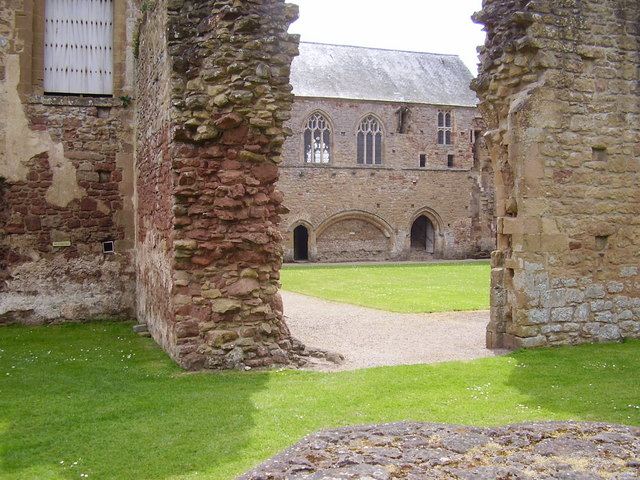
View of the cloister from the site of the monks' choir in the church

Soon after Cleeve became Crown property, it was leased to Anthony Busterd for 21 years. In 1538, the freehold of the site was granted to Robert Radcliffe, 1st Earl of Sussex. The church was demolished, save for the south wall which bounded the cloister, and the rest of the abbey converted into a mansion suitable for a gentleman. By the early seventeenth century, however, Cleeve had turned into a farm. The dormitory was now a large barn, the cloister was the farmyard and the rest of the buildings were used for agricultural purposes and a farm house. A red sandstone barn was built which abuts the south-west corner of the abbey.

George Luttrell of Dunster Castle acquired the site in 1870. The abbey stopped being used as a farm and extensive archaeological excavations took place. The farm house was converted into rental cottages, and the site became a tourist attraction, partly to bring traffic to the West Somerset Railway. Cleeva Clapp a local farmers daughter, who was named after the abbey, acted as a guide and described her nightly "communings" with the ghosts of the monks for a shilling a head.

Cleeve Abbey was passed back to the Crown in 1950–51 to pay Death Duties on the Luttrell estate and was managed by the Department for the Environment. Major restoration and archaeological work followed. In 1984, English Heritage took over responsibility for Cleeve Abbey, carrying out excavations and earthwork surveys and continues to care for it today.

== Present day ==
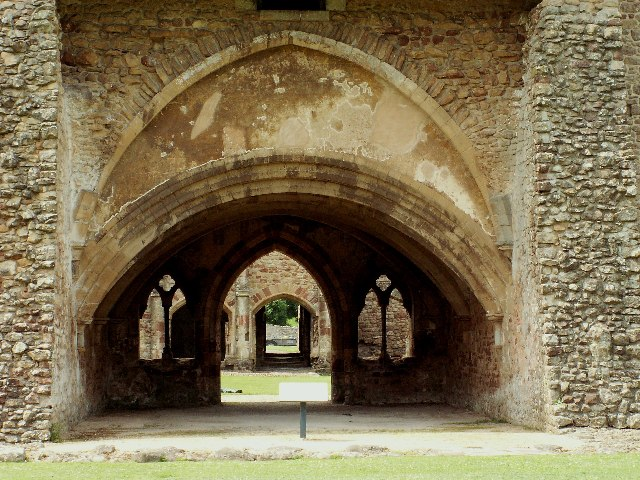
The chapterhouse seen from the site of its now vanished east wall. The monks met here daily to conduct the business of the abbey.

The church and infirmary have almost entirely vanished, but the site boasts some of the finest and best-preserved monks' living quarters still surviving in southern England. The buildings round the cloister are still roofed and habitable and many of the rooms retain their vaults. Among the most important preserved rooms are the chapter house, the refectory with its magnificent arch braced wooden vault and the painted chamber. Much of the abbey's medieval tiled flooring remains. Other major survivals include the abbey gatehouse, which still provides entrance to the visitor, the moat and fishponds. Cleeve is open to the public.

The remains of the buildings have been designated as a Grade I listed building and a Scheduled monument.

== Cultural references ==
The Abbey was the original site on which 'Gracedieu', the setting for the Abbey Series of books by Elsie J. Oxenham, was based. Many of its features described by Oxenham, who visited Cleeve in the early years of the twentieth century, can be identified at the site today, although literary licence allowed her to add features from elsewhere or from her imagination.

The castle scenes in the children's musical-comedy television series Maid Marian and Her Merry Men were filmed in Cleeve Abbey.

== See also ==
- List of monastic houses in Somerset
- Grade I listed buildings in West Somerset
- List of monastic houses in England

== Bibliography ==
- Burton, Janet; Kerr, Julie (2011). The Cistercians in the middle ages (PDF). Boydell Press. ISBN 978-1-84383-667-4.
- Harrison, Stuart A. (2000). Cleeve Abbey. English Heritage. ISBN 1-85074-760-1.
- James, Montague Rhodes (1926). Abbeys. The Ballantyne Press.
- Norton, Christopher; Park, David (1986). Cistercian art and architecture in the British Isles (PDF). Cambridge University Press. ISBN 978-0-521-25475-5. Archived from the original (PDF) on 14 July 2014.
- Platt, Colin (1984). The Abbeys and Priories of Medieval England. Secker & Warburg. ISBN 978-0-436-37557-6.
- Leete-Hodge, Lornie (1985). Curiosities of Somerset. Bodmin: Bossiney Books. ISBN 0-906456-98-3.
- Robinson, David; Burton, Janet; Coldstream, Nicola; Coppack, Glyn; Fawcett, Richard (1998). The Cistercian Abbeys of Britain. Batsford Ltd. ISBN 978-0-7134-8392-5.
