= Margaret Simey =

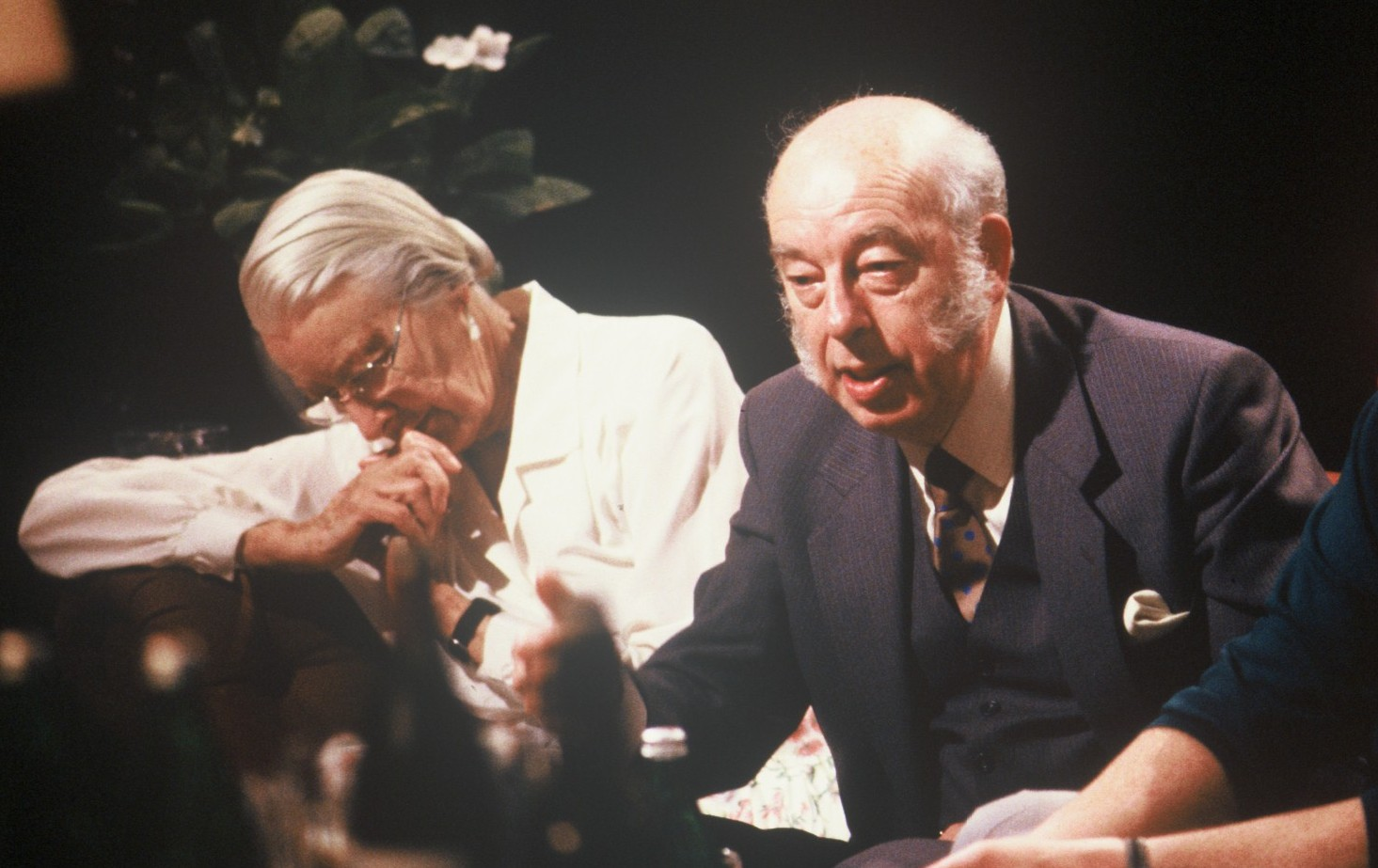
Appearing with Rhodes Boyson on television programme After Dark in 1989

Margaret Bayne Todd (4 January 1906 – 27 July 2004) was a political and social campaigner born in Glasgow but is usually more associated with Liverpool, settling there in the 1920s and becoming the first woman to achieve a degree in sociology. She married Thomas Spensley Simey, a political scientist at Liverpool University; he was later awarded a life peerage by Harold Wilson, but she did not use the title "Lady Simey". They had one son.

She attended St Paul's Girls' School in London, and was involved, with Elsie J. Oxenham, in the British Camp Fire Girls' Association. Oxenham wrote the sixteen-year-old Simey into her novel Abbey Girls in Town and dedicated it to her; as a teenager, Simey had chosen "Thistle" as her Camp Fire name and later became known to herself and others as a "prickly customer".

She became well known as a left-wing campaigner in Liverpool, served as a Liverpool City Councillor from 1963, was then a councillor on the now defunct Merseyside County Council from 1974, and was chair of the Merseyside County Police Committee at the time of the Toxteth riots in 1981, frequently coming into conflict with the then Chief Constable, Kenneth Oxford and gaining a reputation for being outspoken about topics in which she believed.

Representing the inner-city Granby Ward, she was well aware of the local tensions which led to the Toxteth Riots; over the preceding decade, the use of police powers to stop and search had increased, and the police had recently begun to close nightclubs associated with crime. Simey had foreseen that this would cause tension and had predicted that the closure of one club in particular would lead to a riot. She was correct.

She also served as a magistrate in Liverpool, was awarded an honorary doctorate of the University of Liverpool for her services to the community, and in 2002 was offered the honour of Freeman of the City of Liverpool, but declined.

Todd died on 27 July 2004, aged 98.

== Bibliography ==
- Simey, Thomas Spensley; Simey, Margaret B. (1960). Charles Booth, Social Scientist. Oxford University Press.
- Simey, Margaret (1985). Government by Consent: The Principle and Practice of Accountability in Local Government. Bedford Square Press/NCVO. ISBN 978-0-7199-1140-8.
- Simey, Margaret (1988). Democracy Rediscovered: A Study in Police Accountability. Pluto. ISBN 978-0-7453-0262-1.
- Simey, Margaret B. (1 January 1996). The Disinherited Society: A Personal View of Social Responsibility in Liverpool During the Twentieth Century. Liverpool University Press. ISBN 978-0-85323-800-3.
- Simey, Margaret (1 June 2005). From Rhetoric to Reality: Life and Work of Frederick D'Aeth. Liverpool University Press. ISBN 978-1-84631-315-8.
