= British Camp Fire Girls' Association =

Youth organization in the United Kingdom

- Country: UK
- Founded: 1921

The British Camp Fire Girls' Association was a youth organisation in the UK. It was founded in 1921 and was an offshoot of Camp Fire USA.

The association was the focus of an article in the March 1999 issue of Best of British magazine.

== See also ==
- Ruth Clark
- Elsie J. Oxenham
- Margaret Simey
