= Elsie J. Oxenham =

English writer (1880–1960)

Elsie Jeanette Dunkerley
- Oxenham c.1910
- Born: Elsie Jeanette Dunkerley; 25 November 1880; Southport, Lancashire
- Died: 9 January 1960 (aged 79); Worthing, Sussex
- Occupation: Children's novelist
- Writing career
- Pen name: Elsie J. Oxenham
- Period: 1907-1959
- Genres: Books for Girls and Young Women
- Literary movement: The Big Three

Elsie Jeanette Dunkerley (25 November 1880 – 9 January 1960), was an English girls' story writer, who took the name Oxenham as her pseudonym when her first book, Goblin Island, was published in 1907. Her Abbey Series of 38 titles are her best-known and best-loved books. In her lifetime she had 87 titles published and another two have since been published by her niece, who discovered the manuscripts in the early 1990s. She is considered a major figure among girls' story writers of the first half of the twentieth century, being one of the 'Big Three' with Elinor Brent-Dyer and Dorita Fairlie Bruce. Angela Brazil is as well-known - perhaps more so - but did not write her books in series about the same group of characters or set in the same place or school, as did the Big Three.

Oxenham's books are widely collected and there are several Appreciation Societies: in the UK, Australia, New Zealand and South Africa; with a total membership of over six hundred, some of whom live in the US, Canada, India and The Netherlands although belonging to one or more of the societies mentioned.

== Biography ==
Elsie Jeanette Dunkerley was born in Southport, Lancashire, England, in November 1880, to an English father and a Scottish mother.

Before she was 2 years old the family moved to Ealing, West London, where they lived for nearly forty years. She and her sisters went to private schools and attended Ealing Congregational Church. The six Dunkerley children in order of age were: Elsie, Marjory (Maida), Roderic, Theodora (Theo), Erica and Hugo. The family lived in five different houses during their time in Ealing and moved to Worthing, Sussex, in 1922. She took the surname Oxenham as her pen name when Goblin Island was published in 1907. Her father, William Arthur Dunkerley, had used the pen-name "John Oxenham" for many years prior to this.

During the London years, Elsie Oxenham became involved in the British Camp Fire Girls movement, and qualified as a Guardian - the leader of a group of Camp Fire Girls. She ran this Camp Fire Group for some 6 years, until the move to Sussex. One of the Camp Fire members was Margaret Bayne Todd - later Margaret, Lady Simey - who appears in Abbey Girls in Town and to whom that title was dedicated. It is thought that she was the 'original' on whom the characters of both Jenny-Wren and Littlejan were based.

At some point during her time in London Oxenham joined the English Folk Dance Society (EFDS - it did not become the English Folk Dance and Song Society [EFDSS] until much later). She then discovered how 'badly' she had been doing the dances - and teaching them! - as related in The Abbey Girls Go Back to School (published 1922). Everything that the 'Writing Person' [her on-page persona] told Maidlin, Jen and Joy, in The New Abbey Girls (published 1923), about dancing, Grey Edward, and the Camp Fire had happened as described.

After the family had moved to Worthing, Oxenham taught folk dancing in nearby villages and schools. She tried to start another Camp Fire but that was not a success as most of the girls of the right age were already Girl Guides.

At first, the family all lived at Farncombe Road, Worthing, but after their mother died the four sisters moved out, living in pairs, Elsie with Maida, and Erica with Theo. None of the sisters married, but both brothers did. Elsie died in a local nursing Home in January 1960, a few days after Erica.

== Books and series ==
=== Abbey Series ===
Oxenham is best known for her Abbey Series of 38 titles which chart the lives of the main characters from their mid-teens until their daughters reach a similar age. The Hamlet Club, formed in the first book in the series Girls of the Hamlet Club, was set up to combat snobbery in the school. Underlying the club’s overt activities of folk-dancing and rambles was its motto 'To be or not to be', and its badge, the Whiteleaf Cross. These were both symbols of deeper meanings. The motto, deliberately using a quote from the Shakespeare play Hamlet, is taken to mean to make the right choice, usually duty above self-interest, when it arises. Throughout the Abbey Series the various main characters come up against this choice and its consequences, and are shown growing and maturing through making difficult decisions. The badge, taken from a landmark local to the area in which the series is set, is also symbolic—as is any cross—of sacrifice.

The Abbey of the series is almost a character in itself. Based on Cleeve Abbey in Somerset, it first appears as a romantic ruin in the second of the series The Abbey Girls. By the end of this book, the cousins Joan and Joy Shirley are living in Abinger Hall, in the gardens of which the Abbey is situated. Joy has been discovered to be the granddaughter of the late owner, Sir Antony Abinger, and the Hall is left to her, but Joan, who was not related to Sir Antony, has been left the Abbey "Because of [her] love for it, and because [her] knowledge of it was so thorough." The Abbey and its influence pervades the whole series. Characters try to live up to the precepts of the early Cistercian monks who lived there, and even when facing difficult situations abroad, find that the Abbey ethos helps them find the way through to the right decision.

Oxenham depicted herself directly and indirectly in several places within the Abbey series. As "The Writing Person" she is depicting herself as she was in the early 1920s, over 40 years of age and going to the folk dance classes run by the English Folk Dance Society in London. Once Mary-Dorothy Devine, first introduced in The Abbey Girls Again, becomes a writer, statements she makes about the writing experience must logically be those of Oxenham herself. She talks of "finding" the books, and of "listening in to [her own] private wireless". Some fifteen years later according to the internal chronology of the series, and nearly thirty years later in real time, Mary-Dorothy advises Rachel Ellerton, a younger writer who has been trying to get her adult fiction published, to try writing for children:

...my books are for girls, not for grown-ups, but I've felt it worth while to write them ... I’ve never dared to think I could help grown-ups; I doubt if I could even amuse or interest them. But it has seemed worth while to try to influence girls and children for good, by amusing them and catching their interest. Girls are the grown-ups of the future. They may keep something of what is put into them while they are fresh and receptive. I've believed it was more worth while to write for them than to try to write novels.

This statement, from near the end of Oxenham's writing career, seems to convey Oxenham’s own writing credo. It is quoted in its entirety as one of the few insights Oxenham gives into her own reasons for writing. In her very first book, Goblin Island, published nearly fifty years earlier, and written in the first person, Jean, the narrator, says,

Being an author’s daughter, of course I tried to write stories too. I knew all about father's books and helped with many of them, and I always longed to write a book of my own. When I met the Colquhouns I was writing a novel, but it was a secret even from father, for I was very shy about it. But before long my interest in the children ... grew so strong that I left the novel alone. I watched the story of Peggy Colquhoun and Somebody Else to the very end, and it seemed to me that instead of trying to write a novel I might make a story out of the things I had seen really happening.

This would indicate that her own start in writing was similar; it is certainly known that she typed up the writings of her father, John Oxenham, a task later taken on by her sister Erica Dunkerley, who also used the pseudonym Oxenham for her published writings.

== Themes and influences ==
=== Religion ===
Oxenham's religious background was in Congregationalism. This gave a Protestant ethos to her writing and her expressed opinions. Many of her characters go through difficult periods in their lives, and their religious beliefs help them through. Several of the books written in the 1920s and 1930s, particularly, include discussions between characters as to the meaning of life and the reasons behind events. These in-depth conversations tend to appear less frequently in the later books, but even as late as 1948, in A Fiddler for the Abbey Mary-Dorothy Devine, who has become "advisor-in-chief to the clan" talks to Rosalind Kane about the biblical concept of "rain falling on the just and the unjust" and the reasons behind the occurrence of both good and bad events.

=== Folk dancing ===
Folk dancing is a strong influence in many of the books. From Girls of the Hamlet Club (1914) and At School with the Roundheads (1915) until The Girls of the Abbey School (1921), it was shown as a fairly easy thing for girls to do, and to teach each other. By the time of The Abbey Girls Go Back to School (1922) it is apparent that Oxenham herself had come into contact with the English Folk Dance Society and realised that the dances were not so simple after all. The books written from this time for the next six years or so, until Abbey Girls Win Through (1928) depict members of the EFDS hierarchy with affection and almost reverence. It seems that something happened to spoil this relationship, as after 1930 these characters do not appear in the books, and are hardly referred to again, certainly not in such glowing terms. The EFDS makes a brief appearance in An Abbey Champion (1946), but the personnel are no longer named. It may have been as simple as the move to Worthing and the impossibility of maintaining as close a friendship at a distance of some sixty miles, but it has been conjectured that 'Madam' (Helen Kennedy North) and 'The Pixie' (Daisy Caroline Daking) may have objected to the way they were being portrayed. Oxenham never lost the love of folk dancing itself, however, and always shows it as a healthy form of exercise, and a way of lifting oneself out of depression.

=== Camp Fire ===
Camp Fire plays a large part in several of Oxenham’s books published between 1917 and 1940. Oxenham was a Camp Fire Guardian when she lived in Ealing, but the attempt to form a group in Sussex failed. The Camp Fire ideals of Work, Health and Love–'Wohelo'–and the training for young girls in household tasks and cookery it provided, were integral to Oxenham's own philosophy, and underlie the plots of several books. From the Camp Fire as an integral part of a school in A School Camp Fire (1917) and The Crisis in Camp Keema (1928) to the lone Camp Fire Girl, Barbara Holt, in The Junior Captain (1923) and Maidlin becoming a Torchbearer in Maidlin Bears the Torch (1937), Camp Fire is always shown as a way of developing character. As Oxenham became less involved with the organisation, and came more into contact with the Girl Guides, the contrast between the two organisations and their aims are shown, and eventually the reality of the changed situation in England at the time meant that Guides were more often mentioned in her books than Camp Fire.

== Legacy ==
=== Reputation ===
Elsie J. Oxenham is considered by collectors of British Girls' Fiction to be one of the 'Big Three'; the other two being Elinor Brent-Dyer and Dorita Fairlie Bruce. Although Angela Brazil is the first name to come to mind for non-specialists, she did not create long series as the other three did, and in terms of collecting and interest Brazil is less popular than they are.

Oxenham was not the most prolific of these three, as she had 87 titles published during her lifetime (and a further two were published by her niece, who discovered the manuscripts among Oxenham's papers in the 1990s) whereas Brent-Dyer published 100 books of various kinds. Nearly forty of Oxenham's books comprise the main Abbey Series, with another thirty or so in several connecting series and the remaining twenty - some in small series of their own, and some isolated titles - having no connection with the Abbey books at all. During the 1920s to the 1950s she had several short stories, and some longer serialised ones, published in Annuals such as the Girl's Own Annual, British Girl's Annual, Little Folks and Hulton's Girls' Stories. Some of these stories were connected to the books - i.e. dealt with characters from one of her books or series - others became books, or sections of books, that were published a year or two later.

=== Reprinted titles ===
Collins reprinted most of the Oxenham titles that they had published in various of their publishing series, in particular the main titles in the Abbey Series which were produced in several different formats. Her other publishers did so less often, if at all, though a few titles had one or two reissues. This is why the non-Collins books are normally rarer - and consequently more expensive for the collector.

Several books have more recently been reprinted by Girls Gone By Publishers, who republished a few of the early titles in the main Abbey Series. Elsie Oxenham's first book was Goblin Island, published in 1907. This was reprinted in October 2007 by Girls Gone By Publishers as a centenary edition, with all the known illustrations from every edition, a new introduction, and a full publishing history.

Goblin Island became the first in the so-called Scottish Sequence of six titles, four of which are set largely in Scotland: Goblin Island itself, set on 'Loch Avie', a fictionalised Loch Lomond; Princess in Tatters, set on 'Loch Ruel', which may be Loch Fyne; A Holiday Queen, set at 'Morven' on what appears to be Loch Long; and Schoolgirls and Scouts set at 'Glenleny', which also seems to be on Loch Long, but a bit further up the loch. Of the other two in the series, Twins of Castle Charming - perhaps Oxenham's rarest title - is set largely in Switzerland, whereas Finding Her Family has some early scenes set in Ealing and mainly takes place in Saltburn.

From 2012, the EJO Society has been reprinting the titles originally published by Chambers and Muller, thanks to permission granted by EJO's niece. Girls of the Hamlet Club, Biddy's Secret, Joy's New Adventure, Rosaly's New School, Abbey Champion, Two Form Captains, Maidlin to the Rescue, Captain of the Fifth, Fiddler for the Abbey, The Junior Captain, Guardians of the Abbey, The School Without a Name, Ven at Gregory's and Rosamund's Victory, A School Camp Fire, Rachel in the Abbey, The Troubles of Tazy, The Secrets of Vairy, Elsa Puts Things Right, The School of Ups and Downs, Daring Doranne, and Patience Joan, Outsider have already been published.

=== Appreciation societies ===
==== Elsie Jeanette Oxenham Appreciation Society (UK) ====
The UK EJO Society was founded in 1989 as a "postal meeting place" for all who collect the books of Elsie J. Oxenham and are interested in her work. Its magazine, The Abbey Chronicle, is published three times a year and contains articles about the author, her books, the real places used as settings for the books, the originals of characters within the books, and reports of meetings held by members.

One of the interests of collectors and EJO Society members is finding and visiting the original sites used by Oxenham in her books. As well as the Buckinghamshire/Oxfordshire area which is the background for Girls of the Hamlet Club and the village of Washford, Somerset where Cleeve Abbey is situated, Oxenham used parts of Sussex, Wales, Lancashire, the English Lake District and Scotland for the settings of several books. The UK Society holds a biennial meeting at Halsway Manor in the summer, which includes folk-dancing and tours of nearby Cleeve Abbey as if it were the fictional one. These places are not always depicted in the books exactly as the real sites; Oxenham was writing fiction, and given that she could move an abbey several hundred miles for her purposes, changing a few names and telescoping or stretching distances was also well within her remit.

==== Abbey Girls of Australia ====
The Australian society, The Abbey Girls of Australia, has been in existence since 1985; its motto is 'Bound in Friendship'. It produces a magazine, The Abbey Guardian. There are official branches in several states of Australia. Regular meetings take place, and weekend 'Camps' are held every two or three years to gather people from further afield. May Queen coronations are often held as part of the meetings and camps, but book discussions and general chats are more usual in the less formal meetings.

==== New Zealand ====
New Zealand's Society was founded at about the same time as the British one; its magazine is called The Abbey Gatehouse and the motto is 'Gate Open Be' - a quote from the Abbey books. At the moment there is no web page available for the New Zealand Society.

==== Rest of the World ====
In both South Africa and North America there are groups who meet regularly, but they do not produce their own magazines. Members of the groups receive the magazines which do exist, normally each subscribing to one of the three, as well as magazines for other author interest societies, as a means of sharing them among the rest of the group.

=== Seat at Cleeve Abbey ===
In 1995 the EJO Societies worldwide held a collection to provide a seat at Cleeve Abbey as a recognition of the inspiration that the author received by her visits to the Abbey, and her collection of photographs of the site. In summer it is usually placed against the outer wall of the west range to overlook the gatehouse meadow.

The plaque on the seat reads:

IN MEMORY OF
ELSIE JEANETTE OXENHAM (1880-1960)
WHOSE VISITS TO CLEEVE ABBEY
INSPIRED HER ABBEY BOOKS
GIVEN BY MEMBERS OF THE WORLD-WIDE
ELSIE OXENHAM SOCIETIES

== Bibliography ==
- Oxenham, Erica (1942). J.O. Longmans, Green & Co.
- Oxenham, Erica (1946). Scrap-Book of J.O. Longmans, Green & Co.
- Thompson, Allison (1998). Lighting the Fire: Elsie J. Oxenham, The Abbey Girls, and the English Folk Dance Revival. Squirrel Hill Press - musicsleuth.com/sqpress/ltfhome.html. ISBN 0-9666563-0-X.
- Sims, Sue; Clare, Hilary (2000). The Encyclopaedia of School Stories. Ashgate. ISBN 0-75460-082-3.
- Godfrey, Monica (2003). The World of Elsie Jeanette Oxenham and her Books. Girls Gone By Publishers. ISBN 1-904417-15-9.
- Waring, Stella; Ray, Sheila (2006). Island to Abbey; Survival and Sanctuary in the books of Elsie J. Oxenham 1907 to 1959. Girls Gone By Publishers. ISBN 1-904417-80-9.
- Mary Cadogan, 'Dunkerley, Elsie Jeanette (1880–1960)', Oxford Dictionary of National Biography, Oxford University Press, 2004 , accessed 24 Feb 2007 (needs log-in)
