= Abbey Connectors =

Abbey Connectors are titles by Elsie J. Oxenham that connect into her main Abbey Series. They fall into several sub-series, listed here in best reading order, with the Abbey Titles they relate to shown in their place in the mini-series, but without publication details, which are on the main Abbey Series page:

Dustjacket from The Captain of the Fifth, see Swiss Set

The information is all gleaned from the books themselves, or from Monica Godfrey's The World of Elsie Jeanette Oxenham and Her Books.

== Close Connectors ==
=== Camp Keema Series ===
code	Title	Date	Publisher	Illustrator
CK1	The Crisis in Camp Keema	1928	Chambers	Percy Tarrant
CK2	Peggy and The Brotherhood	1936	R.T.S./G.O.P. †g	not credited
CK3	The Camp Mystery	1932	Collins †g	not credited
CK4	The Abbey Girls Play Up		also part of the main Abbey Series	

The Camp Keema Series introduces Maribel Ritchie (later Marchwood) and Rosalind Firth. The first two books in this series, Crisis in Camp Keema and Peggy and the Brotherhood, are set in a fictionalised Worthing, Sussex. The third, Camp Mystery, is set at Talloires on Lake Annecy, France and introduces Cecily Brown (later Perowne). These three characters enter the Abbey Series in The Abbey Girls Play Up (once more, set mainly in Sussex) and appear again, or are referred to, at intervals later in that series. The publication dates are interesting; Oxenham refers in Abbey Girls Play Up (1930) to events in Cecily Brown's earlier life, which were not fully described until Camp Mystery was published two years later. Indeed, the version of her story given in Play Up, while naturally being simplified – one cannot relate the whole plot in detail when summarising events for a new acquaintance – misses several important features which Oxenham may not have thought of until she actually came to write Camp Mystery, the book that covers these events, a year or two after writing Play Up. Then, four years later again, she returned to the period between Crisis (1928) and Mystery (1932) and wrote Peggy (1936) which fills in events concerning Rosalind's younger brother and sister, John and Gina, as well as introducing new characters Peggy and Sharly, and letting us see more of Maribel's school life.

=== Kentisbury Series ===
code	Title	Date	Publisher	Illustrator
K1	Patch and a Pawn	1940	Warne	not credited
K2	Rosamund's Tuckshop		also part of the main Abbey Series	
K3	The Secrets of Vairy	1947	Muller †e	Margaret Horder
K4	Rosamund's Castle		also part of the main Abbey Series	
K5	Jandy Mac Comes Back		also part of the main Abbey Series	
K6	Song of the Abbey		also part of the main Abbey Series	

The Kentisbury Series is much more closely tied into the Abbey Series. Patch and a Pawn introduces Patricia (Patch) Paterson (later Kane), Rhoda, Geoff, Bill and Rosalie Kane, Tansy Lillico and Roger Black. It is set in and around 'Kentisbury Castle', a fictionalised Arundel, Sussex. Rhoda and Rosalie reappear in Rosamund's Tuckshop, also set in Sussex, at Washington. Bill, Patch and Roger reappear in Secrets of Vairy. set at 'Vairy Castle', a fictionalised Knockderry Castle on Loch Long, Scotland. Tansy reappears in Rosamund's Castle, once again set at Washington and Kentisbury/Arundel, and Jandy Mac Comes Back is also set mainly at Kentisbury. Bill and Patch as newly-weds appear in Song of the Abbey; the scenes in which they appear are set at Kentisbury, although the main action of the book takes place at The Abbey in Oxfordshire. These characters are all mentioned in several books in the main Abbey Series published and set after Rosamund's Tuckshop.

=== Quellyn/Woodend Series ===
code	Title	Date	Publisher	Illustrator
QW1	The Girl Who Wouldn't Make Friends	1909	Nelson	P. B. Hickling
QW2	Rosamund's Tuckshop		also part of the main Abbey Series	
QW3	Rosamund's Castle		also part of the main Abbey Series	
QW4	New Girls at Wood End	1957	Frederick Books/Blackie	D/J Margery Gill
QW5	Robins in the Abbey		also part of the main Abbey Series	

The Quellyn/Woodend Series provides an awkward problem of internal chronology within Oxenham's various book series. The main Abbey Series can be dated to within a year or two by events in the real world that are mentioned in Girls of the Hamlet Club, although it is recognised that there are anachronisms in the Retrospective Series. But in The Girl Who Wouldn't Make Friends we are introduced to Robin (Robertina Brent, later Quellyn) and Gwyneth Morgan (later Lloyd) as twelve-year-olds; although the story starts in the London suburbs, most of the action takes place at 'Quellyn' and Nefyn on the Llŷn Peninsula in North Wales. The next part of their story is told in Rosamund's Tuckshop and Rosamund's Castle, both in the main Abbey Series when they are seventeen or so, about five years later in 'Abbey Time', but which were published eighteen and nineteen years later respectively. These two books are set at 'Wood End School' in Washington, Sussex. Robin's romance and marriage are described in Robins in the Abbey, published in 1947, and set mainly in Oxfordshire at 'The Abbey' and at 'Quellyn', but in 1957 Oxenham returned to Robin's school career, and produced New Girls at Wood End, a book about Robin's time as Head Girl, set in the spring following Rosamund's Castle.

The world of 1909, in which 'motors' can be driven across fields and through gated lanes by a twelve-year-old Gwyneth, and where a telegram is brought from the post office in the nearest town by bicycle, contrasts starkly with the air crash that features in Robins in the Abbey and the car accident and BBC news bulletins of New Girls at Wood End – and with the ownership and use of the telephone in the latter two titles as a normal and common feature.

=== Rocklands Series ===
code	Title	Date	Publisher	Illustrator
Ro1	A Go-Ahead Schoolgirl	1919	Chambers	H. Earnshaw
Ro2	Tickles, or The School that was Different	1924	Partridge	not credited
Ro3	Jen of the Abbey School		also part of the main Abbey Series	
Ro4	Rosamund's Victory †e		also part of the main Abbey Series	

A Go-Ahead Schoolgirl takes place during the World War I at Rocklands School in Yorkshire. The description of the area has more in common with Froggatt Edge in Derbyshire, but Oxenham is well known for her 'translocation' of places to fit the story. It tells of Rena (Andrena) Mackay (later Courtney) and her friend Nancy Morrell, and their time at school. When Rena's father is killed in the War, she must find a career. The headmistress's sister, who owns Rocklands House, helps her, and another friend, Lisabel (Elisabel) Durrant (also later Courtney – they marry brothers), to become gardeners, and sends them to Swanley to train. Tickles tells of a new junior at the School, Tekla (Tickles) and her amazement at the school which moves every spring from Sheffield to the moors at Rocklands and returns each autumn. Jen of the Abbey School – also considered part of the main Abbey Series, continues the story of Tekla's school career and describes how the girls of Rocklands meet Jen Robins (later Marchwood) of the Abbey Series. Rosamund's Victory continues the story of Rena and Lisabel and describes their engagements. Lisabel, by this time married with a baby daughter, also plays a significant role in New Girls at Wood End (see the Quellyn/Woodend series above). Betty McLean, head girl of Rocklands in Tickles and Jen, comes into the main Abbey Series in Abbey Girls at Home and appears or is mentioned in many later titles in that series.

=== Rachel and Damaris/Rainbows Series ===
code	Title	Date	Publisher	Illustrator
Ra1	Damaris at Dorothy's	1937	SPCK/Sheldon	'Bea'
Ra2	Maidlin to the Rescue †e		also part of the main Abbey Series	
Ra3	Damaris Dances	1940	O.U.P	Margaret Horder
Ra4	Adventure for Two	1941	O.U.P.	Margaret Horder
Ra5	Elsa Puts Things Right	1944	Muller †e	Margaret Horder
Ra6	Pernel Wins	1942	Muller †e	Margaret Horder
Ra7	Daring Doranne	1945	Muller †e	Margaret Horder
Ra8	Margery Meets the Roses	1947	Lutterworth †g	V. Bertoglio
Ra0	Mistress Nanciebel	1910	Hodder & Stoughton (later editions O.U.P.)	J. A. Durden

The Rachel & Damaris/Rainbows Series is another example of how Oxenham combines series and characters, weaving in and out of the main Abbey Series. Maidlin to the Rescue was published in 1934, and tells of Maidlin's previously unknown cousins, Rachel and Damaris, and how Maidlin overcomes their resistance to being 'adopted' by her and brings them back to The Abbey. Damaris at Dorothy's, published three years later, returns to the schooldays of Rachel and Damaris and gives the back story of their relationship with Philippa (Pip) Russell, who plays a crucial part in the plot of Maidlin to the Rescue. Damaris Dances was written in response to Oxenham's publishers' wish for a 'ballet book'. Apparently it took several years and many revisions, since Oxenham was not a ballet expert. It covers the period in the main Abbey Series from just before Joy's New Adventure to just after Maidlin Bears the Torch. Rachel and Damaris have a cameo in Two Joans in the Abbey and appear briefly in Abbey Champion as bridesmaids at Maidlin's wedding to Jock Robertson. From Guardians of the Abbey onwards, their characters are fully integrated into the main Abbey Series.

Adventure for Two takes the Rainbows series in a different direction. It takes place partly concurrently with, and just after, Damaris Dances. Two sisters, Daphne and Elsa Dale, make different decisions after the death of their aunt. Daphne continues her ballet training in London, and comes to know Damaris and take part in her ballet 'The Goose Girl'. Elsa returns to 'Hillside', near 'Sandylands' – a fictionalised Uphill, near Weston-super-Mare – to live in the cottage their aunt has left to her. The rest of the series introduces Nancybell Morgan (later Farnham), Margery Paine (later Woodburn), Gilbert and Annamaria Seymour, and the 'Rose sisters'. Pernel Wins and Daring Doranne tie into this series in that the characters in Pernel, Pernel Richard herself, Juliet Joyes and Gwen Baldwin come to live at 'Rainbow Corner' at the beginning of Doranne, and the village Doranne founds, also called 'Rainbows', is where the 'Roses' live, and where Margery Paine comes to make her new beginning. The Roses join the main Abbey Series in Fiddler for the Abbey, and news of the other characters is given in some of the later books in the Abbey Series. Mistress Nanciebel, published in 1910, tells the story of 'the ancestress' of Gilbert and Annamaria Seymour, and of Nancybell Morgan. Here, Oxenham has created a family history for her modern characters by using details from another of her books, published over thirty years earlier.

== Remote Connectors ==
=== Torment Series ===
code	Title	Date	Publisher	Illustrator
T1	The School Torment	1920	Chambers	H. Earnshaw
T2	The Testing of the Torment	1925	Cassell	P. B. Hickling
T3	The Camp Fire Torment	1926	Chambers	Enid Browne

- Tormentil Grant appears in The Abbey Girls Go Back to School (A11) but this is the only real link with the Abbey Series. All three books are set on Lake Bala in North Wales.

=== Sussex Set ===
code	Title	Date	Publisher	Illustrator
Sx1	The Junior Captain	1923	Chambers †e	Percy Tarrant
Sx2	Peggy Makes Good	1927	Partridge	H. L. Bacon
Sx3	The School Without A Name	1924	Chambers †e	Nina K. Brisley
Sx4	Ven at Gregory's	1925	Chambers †e	Nina K. Brisley
Sx5	The Troubles of Tazy		see Sw4 below	
Sx5	Patience and her Problems		see Wd3 below	

=== Swiss Set ===
code	Title	Date	Publisher	Illustrator
Sw1	The Two Form Captains	1921	Chambers †e	Percy Tarrant
Sw2	The Captain of the Fifth	1922	Chambers †e	Percy Tarrant
Sw3	The Camp Mystery		see CK3 above	
Sw4	The Troubles of Tazy	1926	Chambers †e	Percy Tarrant
Sw5	Patience and her Problems		see Wd3 below	

Pictorial boards from A School Camp Fire

=== Woody Dean Set ===
code	Title	Date	Publisher	Illustrator
Wd1	The School of Ups and Downs	1918	Chambers †e	H. Earnshaw
Wd2	Patience Joan, Outsider	1922	Cassell †e	not credited
Wd3	Patience and her Problems	1927	Chambers	Molly Benatar
Wd0	A School Camp Fire	1917	Chambers †e	Percy Tarrant

These three sets, Sussex, Swiss and Woody Dean, are closely connected to each other, as may be seen by the titles they share. The village of 'Woody Dean', the setting for the Woody Dean Set, is a fictionalised Rottingdean in East Sussex, and the nearby school may be based on Roedean School. The Sussex Set takes place mainly in Pagham though it is never named, and the cathedral city mentioned in the text as 'Eldingham' must be intended as Chichester. Troubles of Tazy and Patience and her Problems both take place largely in Switzerland, either at the St John's & St Mary's Schools complex where the earlier books in the Swiss Set are based, or in the nearby hostel for girls and ladies, and characters from all three sets appear in these two titles.

A School Camp Fire is another of those titles that Oxenham 'revisited', to take characters and bring them into books she wrote later. Several main characters from it attend Helen Robinson's wedding in School of Ups and Downs but it has no connection otherwise, and cannot be said to form part of a real series. As a book, it is in itself split into four sub-sections each of which tells a discrete story, though the characters of Priscilla, Katharine and Dorothy-Anne are present throughout the book.

Characters from the Swiss Set also appear or are mentioned in the Camp Keema Series and in the Abbey Series itself, which gives the only connection these titles have with the main series.

- †g = republished in paperback by Girls Gone By Publishers
- †e = reprinted by The Elsie J. Oxenham Society/Abbey Chronicle
- See also The Elsie J. Oxenham Society/Abbey Chronicle web site, which includes extra notes on how the series fit with each other and connect into the Abbey Series.
