= Thomas Simey, Baron Simey =

Thomas Spensley Simey, Baron Simey (25 November 1906 – 27 December 1969) was a British academic and life peer. Son of George Iliff Simey, Clerk of the Peace and of the Council of Somerset. He was educated at Balliol College, Oxford, and in 1935 married Margaret Simey. He was the Charles Booth Professor of Social Science at the University of Liverpool between 1939 and 1969. Mary Chamberlain has described him as "a key proponent of the 'modern sociology' and of the burgeoning field of social policy", whose 1946 publication Welfare and Planning in the West Indies was "the first scholarly attempt to come to grips with the sociology of the region and set the agenda for discussion on the family for the next two decades."

He was created a life peer on 12 May 1965 taking the title Baron Simey, of Toxteth in the County Palatine of Lancaster.
