= Nicholas Evans (artist) =

20th century Welsh artist

Nicholas Evans (10 January 1907 – 5 February 2004) was a self-taught Welsh artist from Aberdare. He signed his paintings Nick Evans and was sometimes known by that name. His work was influenced by his spiritual beliefs as a Pentecostal.

== Early life ==
Evans was born in Aberdare, Rhondda Cynon Taf. Evans' talent in drawing was recognized by one of his primary school teachers, who encouraged him to sketch. He stopped after a while, for want of paper. He began work at the age of 14 as a miner, but this lasted only for three years, until the death of his father in 1923, which deeply affected Evans. His mother had also worked in the pits.

In keeping with his mother's wishes, he left mining and became a railwayman, eventually finding a job as a Great Western Railway engine driver for coal trains in the Cynon Valley. He became a member of, and later a lay preacher in, the Welsh Apostolic Church. According to John Harvey, Evans believed that the inspiration for his paintings came directly from God.

He married Annie Lambert (died 1997) in 1928. They had two sons, Victor and Peter, and one daughter, Rhoda. Rhoda encouraged him to continue working in his nineties.

== Career ==
Evans returned to his childhood hobby of drawing in his late sixties, after retirement. Some of his work was exhibited in 1972. In 1978, at the age of 71, he held a solo exhibition at the Oriel Gallery in Cardiff. The positive critical reception led to another exhibition, at the Browse and Darby Gallery in London's Mayfair. Lawrence Gowing from the Slade School compared Evans' work with that of Diego Rivera.

His pictures are in several public galleries, including the Tate Modern and Swansea's Glynn Vivian Art Gallery. Nevertheless, it has been estimated that, of Evans' entire output, only five percent is currently on public display. His sons kept much of his work in a secure storeroom. In 1987 he collaborated with his daughter, Rhoda, to produce a book about his art.

Evans died in 2004 at the age of 96.

== Themes and style ==
Evans' subject matter reflected his two passions: coalmining and his Christian faith. Whereas some modern Welsh artists had portrayed colliers as heroes, Evans shows them typically as victims. Writing for The Independent, Meic Stephens thought that Evans' sympathy for the miners granted them "an iconic power". His depiction of the Day of Judgment has been compared with that of Stanley Spencer.

Following the death of his father, Evans joined the Pentecostal Church, after a kind of spiritual conversion. As a lay preacher, he often visited other valley towns to preach in the street. He explained many of his paintings in terms of biblical imagery and reported that he often saw angels and the spirits of the departed in his house.

Many of Evans' pictures are religious scenes transported to industrial settings. For example, in Entombed - Jesus in the Midst (from 1974) at the National Museum Wales, the Christ is preaching to a group of miners. The figures tend to have biblical poses, as they do in Carrying out the Dead (from 1979). In Black Avalanche (from 1978), Evans's response to the 1966 Aberfan Disaster, he shows a policeman carrying the body of a child, surrounded by grieving parents. Aberfan, painted in 1979, is on display in the Glynn Vivian Art Gallery, Swansea. Evans continued to paint in his nineties. An exhibition In His Oils was held in March 2001 at the Rhondda Heritage Park. In April 2022, he was prominently featured in the Glynn Vivian's exhibition, "Art and Industry, Stories from South Wales"

John Harvey, Director of the Centre for Studies in the Visual Culture of Religion at the University of Wales, Aberystwyth, described Evans as "a unique artist in Wales," and as "one of the finest painters Wales has ever produced". Evans's life and work was examined in the BBC Radio Wales programme All Things Considered in 2010.
