= Oxenham Non-Connectors =

Dustjacket from Dorothy's Dilemma

Non-Connectors are titles by Elsie J. Oxenham that do not connect into her main Abbey Series.

There are four of these series, they have no connections with each other, or with any of EJO's other books. They are shown below in best reading order (which does not always accord with publication order) except for the Scottish Sequence (see Notes 4 & 5):

== The Deb Series ==
code	Title	Date	Publisher	Illustrator
D1	Deb at School	1929	Chambers	Nina K. Brisley
D2	Deb of Sea House	1931	Chambers	Nina K. Brisley
D3	Deb Leads the Dormitory	1993	Woodfield	Audrey Lee

Deb at School was first published as a 12-part serial 'St. Margaret's' in the magazine Schooldays Weekly from November 1928 until January 1929. It explores the relationship between Deb, a new girl at St. Margaret's School in Sussex, and Chloe, a senior to whom she gives admiration. Chloe is not worthy of the 'crush' – although other juniors have also fallen under her spell – and lets Deb down very badly. But Deb forgives her and she is redeemed at the end. Deb of Sea House brings in two much younger juniors, who themselves have a crush on Deb. How she deals with this, and comes to realise, through the head girl, Selina, that the admiration of juniors for seniors can be beneficial if the influence is used for good purposes, provides the main theme for this title. In Deb Leads the Dormitory, Deb herself becomes dormitory prefect, and has to help Chloe with a young cousin, Claudia, who has just joined the school knowing nothing of Chloe's shady past. This title did not find a publisher in Oxenham's lifetime, but was published by her niece in 1993.

== The Jinty Series ==
code	Title	Date	Publisher	Illustrator
J1	The Tuckshop Girl	1916	Chambers	H Earnshaw
J2	The Reformation of Jinty	1933	Chambers	Rene Cloke
J3	Jinty's Patrol	1934	Newnes	not credited
J4	A Divided Patrol	1992	Woodfield	'Ros'

In this series Oxenham picks up threads from a story she had published sixteen years earlier. Tuckshop Girl tells how Jinty arrives at a school in the western suburbs of London from the Scottish Highlands. Her catastrophic introduction is redeemed by her good intentions, and Prue, the 'tuckshop girl' of the title, helps her to integrate into the school. Later titles bring Jinty herself more to the fore, and Prue is kept in the background, though the final title gives a satisfactory end to her story. It is probable that Oxenham was being pressed by publishers for more 'schoolgirl' type stories, and took a schoolgirl character from an earlier book and tried to develop her story and character. Reformation of Jinty and Jinty's Patrol were published at about the same time that Oxenham was developing characters from her Abbey Series into adulthood, whereas her publishers were looking to sell to a younger audience. Divided Patrol did not find a publisher in Oxenham's lifetime, but was published by her niece in 1992.

== The Scottish Sequence ==
code	Title	Date	Publisher	Illustrator
Sc1	Goblin Island	1907	Collins g	Heath Robinson
Sc2	A Princess in Tatters	1908	Collins	Frank Adams
Sc3	A Holiday Queen	1910	Collins	T. J. Overnell
Sc4	Schoolgirls and Scouts	1914	Collins	Arthur Dixon
Sc5	Finding her Family	1915	S.P.C.K.	W. S. Stacey
Sc6	Twins of Castle Charming	1920	Swarthmore Press	none

Of the six titles in this series, four are set largely in Scotland: Goblin Island is set on 'Loch Avie', a fictionalised Loch Lomond; Princess in Tatters is set on 'Loch Ruel', which may be Loch Fyne; A Holiday Queen is set at 'Morven' on what appears to be Loch Long; and Schoolgirls and Scouts is set at 'Glenleny', which also seems to be on Loch Long, but a bit further up the loch. Twins of Castle Charming – perhaps Oxenham's rarest title – is set largely in Switzerland, whereas Finding Her Family has some early scenes set in Ealing and mainly takes place in Saltburn. The connections between these titles is rather tenuous, there being no single character or place that appears in all six. Jill Colquhoun from Goblin Island reappears in Twins of Castle Charming and Schoolgirls and Scouts. Eilidh the 'Princess' from Princess in Tatters also appears in Schoolgirls and Scouts and plays an important role in Twins of Castle Charming. Larry Avery appears in both Princess and Twins. Lexa Stewart is the main character of Holiday Queen and reappears briefly in Schoolgirls and Scouts. Monica Howard has an important role in Holiday Queen and reappears in both Schoolgirls and Finding her Family. Melany and Blanche Merrill are the main characters in Twins of Castle Charming and reappear as minor characters in Schoolgirls and Scouts. Elspeth Buchanan is the main character of Schoolgirls and Scouts, which tells of her feud and reconciliation with Mysie and Madge Campbell. The school – never named, but its headmistress is Miss Johnson – which is the setting for the first chapters of both Schoolgirls and Twins, has among its pupils Jill, Melany, Monica and Elspeth, and later Jill's sister Sheila, introduced in Goblin Island, and Mysie and Madge from Schoolgirls.

Dustjacket from At School with the Roundheads

== Isolated Titles ==
(listed in order of publication)

code	Title	Date	Publisher	Illustrator
Is1	The Conquest of Christina	1909	Collins	G. B. Foyster
Is2	Rosaly's New School	1913	Chambers e	T. J. Overnell
Is3	At School with the Roundheads	1915	Chambers	H. Earnshaw
Is4	Expelled From School	1919	Collins	Victor Prost
Is5	The Girls of Gwynfa	1924	Warne	Nina K. Brisley
Is6	Dorothy's Dilemma	1930	Chambers	Nina K. Brisley
Is7	Sylvia of Sarn	1937	Warne	not credited

Conquest of Christina, Girls of Gwynfa and Sylvia of Sarn are set in Wales, a favourite holiday destination for the Dunkerley family. Rosaly's New School is set in Goathland, Yorkshire, and At School with the Roundheads set at 'Redburn', an amalgam of Saltburn and Redcar. Expelled from School is set in Switzerland and Dorothy's Dilemma in Sussex, both favourite settings which Oxenham used frequently.

== Footnotes ==
See also The Elsie J. Oxenham Society/Abbey Chronicle web site, which has extra notes on how the series fit together.
