= Abbey Series =

38-book series by Elsie J. Oxenham

The Abbey Girls
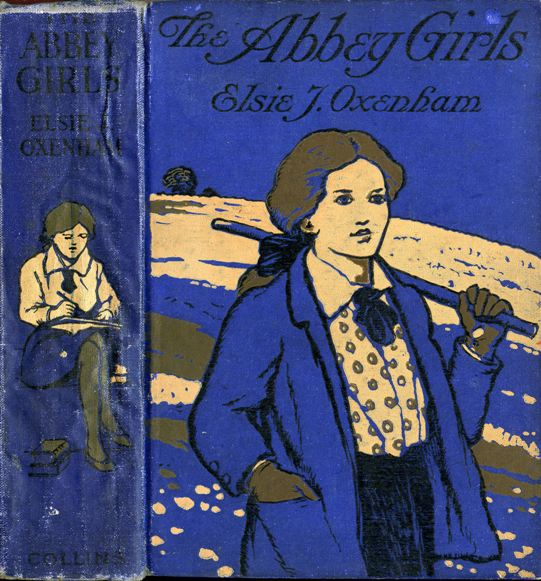
- Pictorial boards from the first edition, (1920), of the book which gave its name to the whole series
- Author: Elsie J. Oxenham
- Illustrator: Arthur A. Dixon
- Cover artist: presumably also Arthur A. Dixon
- Language: English
- Series: The Abbey Series
- Genre: Girls' Novels
- Publisher: Collins
- Publication date: 1st edition 1920
- Publication place: United Kingdom
- Media type: Print (hardback)
- Pages: 320
- Preceded by: The Girls of the Hamlet Club
- Followed by: The Girls of the Abbey School

The Abbey Series of British novels by Elsie J. Oxenham comprises 38 titles which were published between 1914 and 1959. The first title, Girls of the Hamlet Club set the scene for the school aspects of the series, but it is the second title, The Abbey Girls, that introduces The Abbey – almost a character within the series in its own right – a romantic ruin that inspires love for it as a quiet, peaceful place, and creates the wish to behave in the public-spirited tradition of the early Cistercian monks. These qualities go some way towards explaining the popularity of the series.

== Background ==
Girls of the Hamlet Club (1914) is set in Miss Macey's school in Wycombe and in the surrounding hamlets and villages. It tells how Cicely Hobart comes to Whiteleaf to be near her maternal grandparents. She has been living in a London suburb, but will now board with an old family servant, and go to school in Wycombe. She finds that the school is split into two sets, the 'real school' and the 'hamlets' who are mainly girls who have come to the school on scholarships, but live in the country hamlets, and cannot afford extras like the clubs, which set high subscriptions to keep them out. Cicely organises the outsiders into The Hamlet Club with a motto 'To be or not to be' from Shakespeare's Hamlet and the Whiteleaf Cross, a local landmark, as their badge. As the club develops, its members learn Morris and Country Dancing, and prepare a May Queen ceremony for Cicely's grandparents. The Hamlet Club comes to the rescue of the school when the leading actors in the school play come down with measles; they sacrifice their secret for the good of the school and Miriam Honor is crowned as the first Queen.

The Abbey Girls (1920) is the second title of the series, and tells of two red-headed cousins, Joan and Joy Shirley, and how, in different ways, they manage to get places at Miss Macey's School. These two characters are the original 'Abbey Girls' and the series continues with stories about them and the friends they make throughout, not only their schooldays, but also their adult lives. An early friend, Jen Robins, soon becomes a major character, and others, Jandy Mac, Rosamund and Maidlin, can all claim the sobriquet 'Abbey Girl'. By the end of the series these six are all married with children, and the adventures of the daughters of Joan, Joy, Jandy and Jen, at the same school, have come to the fore.

There was no 'Abbey School' as such, although The Girls of the Abbey School (1921) tells how the school spent a term in Abinger Hall, the home of Joy Shirley, which had the ruined abbey of Gracedieu in its grounds. The Abbey was based on Cleeve Abbey in Somerset – an English Heritage Property open to the public in the summer months. Oxenham 'moved' this ruin to Oxfordshire, near the Buckinghamshire border, for the plot of The Abbey Girls, to tie the cousins in with the characters from the first book, Girls of the Hamlet Club.

== Main series ==
code	Title	Date	Publisher	Illustrator
	First Generation Titles			
A01	The Girls of the Hamlet Club e	1914	Chambers	Harold Earnshaw
A02	The Abbey Girls °†g	1920	Collins	Arthur Dixon
A03	The Girls of the Abbey School °g	1921	Collins	Elsie Anna Wood
A11	The Abbey Girls Go Back to School °†g	1922	Collins	Elsie Anna Wood
A13	The New Abbey Girls °g	1923	Collins	Elsie Anna Wood
A14	The Abbey Girls Again °	1924	Collins	Elsie Anna Wood
A15	The Abbey Girls in Town °†	1925	Collins	Rosa C Petherick
A16	The Queen of the Abbey Girls °g	1926	Collins	E. J. Kealey
A12	Jen of the Abbey School °†g [see note 1]	1927	Collins	frontis. E. A. Wood, others F. Meyerheim
A17	The Abbey Girls Win Through °†	1928	Collins	not credited
A18	The Abbey Girls at Home °†	1929	Collins	Inder Burns
A19	The Abbey Girls Play Up °†	1930	Collins	not credited
A20	The Abbey Girls on Trial °†	1931	Collins	'C.P.S.'
A21	Biddy's Secret e	1932	Chambers	Nina K. Brisley
A22	Rosamund's Victory e	1933	Harrap	Victor Cooley
A23	Maidlin to the Rescue e	1934	Chambers	Rene Cloke
A24	Joy's New Adventure e	1935	Chambers	Rene Cloke
A25	Rosamund's Tuckshop g	1937	R.T.S./G.O.P.	not credited
A26	Maidlin Bears the Torch g	1937	R.T.S./G.O.P.	not credited
A27	Rosamund's Castle g	1938	R.T.S./G.O.P.	not credited
	Retrospective Titles		[see note 2]	
A04	Schooldays at the Abbey †	1938	Collins	Sutcliffe
A05	Secrets of the Abbey †	1939	Collins	Heade
A06	Stowaways in the Abbey †‡	1940	Collins	Heade
A07	Schoolgirl Jen at the Abbey †‡	1950	Collins	Frank Varty
A08	Strangers at the Abbey †‡	1951	Collins	Frank Varty
A09	Selma at the Abbey †‡	1952	Collins	Frank Varty
A10	Tomboys at the Abbey ‡	1957	Collins	Frank Varty
	Second Generation Titles			
A29	Jandy Mac Comes Back †‡	1941	Collins	Heade
A28	Maid of the Abbey †‡ [see note 3]	1943	Collins	Heade
A30	Two Joans at the Abbey †	1945	Collins	Margaret Horder
A31	An Abbey Champion e	1946	Muller	Margaret Horder
A32	Robins in the Abbey †‡	1947	Collins	Margaret Horder
A33	A Fiddler for the Abbey e	1948	Muller	Margaret Horder
A34	Guardians of the Abbey e [see note 4]	1950	Muller	Margaret Horder
A35	Rachel in the Abbey e	1951	Muller	M. D. Neilson
A36	A Dancer from the Abbey †‡	1953	Collins	Frank Varty
A37	The Song of the Abbey †‡ [see note 5]	1954	Collins	Frank Varty
A38	Two Queens at the Abbey †‡ [see note 6]	1959	Collins	Frank Varty

° = published as a Collins 'Fat Orange'
† = published as a Collins 'Seagull'
‡ = published as a Collins 'Small Red Abbey'
g = reprinted in paperback by Girls Gone By Publishers
e = reprinted in paperback by The EJO Society

=== Notes to table ===
1. Jen of the Abbey School takes place during and after the events of The Abbey Girls Go Back to School and should therefore be read immediately after it.

2. The Retrospective Titles cover the period between The Girls of The Abbey School and The Abbey Girls Go Back to School, and are probably best read in that position, while remembering that this produces a few inconsistencies with books set later, but written earlier.

3. Maid of the Abbey should be read before Jandy Mac Comes Back.

4. Guardians of the Abbey is partly concurrent with A Fiddler for the Abbey, but should ideally be read after it.

5. The first chapter of The Song of the Abbey overlaps the last of A Dancer from the Abbey.

6. N.B. Two Queens at the Abbey was only ever published as a 'Small Red Abbey'.

== Abbey Connectors ==
Oxenham wrote several other series which tie in with the main Abbey Series; these are known as Abbey Connectors. Characters first used in other titles or series are introduced into the Abbey Series – sometimes stretching the internal chronology. A particular example of this is the character Robin (Robertina) Brent. She first appears as a 12-year-old in The Girl Who Wouldn't Make Friends, an Abbey Connector published in 1909. But she reappears as a 17 to 18-year-old in three titles: Rosamund's Tuckshop (1937), Rosamund's Castle (1938) – both in the Abbey Series – and New Girls at Wood End (1957), an Abbey Connector, as well as appearing in the book that bears her name in the Abbey Series, Robins in the Abbey (1947), when she is 21.

Oxenham also wrote about 20 books which have no connection at all with the Abbey Series; these are known as Non-Connectors.

== Author ==
Dustjacket from The New Abbey Girls.

Oxenham depicts herself in some books in the series as 'The Writing Person', mainly in The New Abbey Girls and The Abbey Girls Again – for more information about the author herself see the article Elsie J. Oxenham.

== Themes ==
Dustjacket from The Song of the Abbey.

Several themes are particularly apparent throughout the series, reflecting Oxenham's own interests and beliefs.

=== Folk dancing ===
Oxenham was an enthusiast of folk dancing and frequently incorporated it into her work; Folk dancing is mentioned in nearly all 38 Abbey books, and the English Folk Dance Society (later the English Folk Dance and Song Society) and its leading members are depicted in some of them, some by real name, others under nicknames.

=== May Queens ===
Another theme used throughout the series was that of May Queens. The Hamlet Club [formed in the first book of the series] chose, towards the end of that book, one of their number as May Queen. By the time of Abbey Girls this has become a tradition in the school of 3 years' standing, and by the end of the series, in Two Queens at the Abbey the Club is 27 years old and crowning Joy's twin daughters as the joint 28th Queen. It is thought that the Whitelands College tradition of May Queens [latterly May Monarchs, since the college became co-ed], which was inspired by John Ruskin, may in turn have inspired Oxenham, perhaps through someone she had met who had been trained at Whitelands, but no definite connection has been established. Certainly Oxenham herself did not attend the college.

=== Christian faith ===
Oxenham was brought up in the Congregational Church (later the United Reformed Church in England), and her beliefs and consequent philosophy of life are apparent throughout the series. Whilst she does not proselytise, her characters discuss the reasons behind good and bad happenings, and grow in their own beliefs as they do so. This allows her to give a depth to the characters that might not otherwise become apparent solely through their actions.

== Elsie Jeanette Oxenham Appreciation Society ==
One of the interests of collectors and EJO Society members is finding and visiting the original sites used by Oxenham in her books. As well as the Bucks/Oxon area and the village of Washford, Somerset where Cleeve Abbey is situated, several books are set in parts of Sussex, Wales, Lancashire, the English Lake District and Scotland. Naturally these are not always depicted exactly as their real counterparts; Oxenham was writing fiction, and if she could move an abbey nearly 200 miles for her purposes, surely changing a few names and telescoping or stretching distances was also well within her remit.
