= Last Term at Malory Towers =

Novel in the school story genre

- Author: Enid Blyton
- Illustrator: Stanley Lloyd
- Language: English
- Genre: School story
- Publisher: Methuen (UK)
- Publication date: 1951
- Publication place: United Kingdom
- Media type: Print (hardback & paperback)
- Preceded by: In the Fifth at Malory Towers

Last Term at Malory Towers is a novel in the school story genre written by Enid Blyton. It is the sixth and final book written by Blyton in her Malory Towers series and, like the previous books in the series, follows Darrell Rivers at the eponymous girls' boarding school.

== Plot summary ==
In her final year, Darrell returns to Malory Towers for her final term. She is now Head Girl at the school.

After taking the new girls to Miss Grayling's study, the two agree that the only real failure in Darrell's year is Gwendoline. Darrell undertakes to do what she can to set her on a more positive path.

The girls discuss their futures: Mary-Lou wants to train as a children's nurse, Clarissa and Bill plan to open a riding school close to Malory Towers, Belinda will train to be an artist and Irene will study music. Darrell, Sally, Alicia and Betty hope to go to university. Gwen boasts that she will be going to a finishing school in Switzerland. To the other girls' disgust, she boasts about the cruel and unkind exchanges she had with her father to emotionally blackmail him into agreeing to her plans.

New girls include Amanda Chartelow and Suzanne, Mam'zelle Rougier's niece. Amanda is tall and physically strong, and plans to compete in the Olympic Games. She is dismissive of the games culture at Malory Towers, saying that there is a second former at the school with outstanding potential whom nobody has noticed. When Moira challenges her, she names June. Amanda undertakes to coach June in tennis and swimming, predicting that she will be in the school second teams by the end of the term. June realises that Amanda's motive is to be proved right, rather than any personal interest in her, but accepts Amanda's offer. However Amanda's tough training regime soon leads to friction between them, and June gives up.

Darrell invites Gwen to her study for a talk in an attempt to fulfil her promise to Miss Grayling. Gwen is sulky and obstinate, and finally maliciously tells Darrell that she is glad that she has made her father miserable: "It will teach him a lesson!" Darrell, appalled, reports her failure to Miss Grayling, who predicts that a terrible punishment is in store for Gwen.

Jo Jones in the Second Form is unpopular because of her loud and boastful behaviour. Her father is similarly loud and boorish. Jo is given five pounds pocket money by him, which she loses. It is found by Matron, but Jo is unwilling to claim it since it is more than the girls are permitted to have. Jo decides to take the money from Matron's office, but inadvertently takes nine pounds instead of five. Later, in a separate incident, the entire Second Form is punished when Jo fails to own up to breaking a school rule. An exasperated form punishes Jo by sending her to Coventry.

Jo decides to run away from the school, taking her friend, the weak and easily influenced first former Deirdre Parker. Soon afterwards, Miss Grayling is told by the police that two of the stolen notes have been presented at local shops by two Malory Towers girls. It soon becomes clear that these are Jo and Deirdre, who are soon found and brought back to the school. Miss Grayling sees Deirdre first, and recognising genuine contrition, asks Matron to deal with her. Miss Grayling tells them that Jo must leave the school, making it clear that, in her view, Jo has been failed by her parents. Jo's father agrees.

Amanda wants to swim in the open sea, but underestimates the strength of the currents and finds herself in danger of being dashed against the rocks. She is rescued by June, but sustains injuries that end her Olympic ambitions. Amanda and June are reconciled. June renews her sports practice while a more mellow Amanda contemplates a future as a games mistress and sports coach.

Gwen is shocked when she is told that her father is seriously ill and may die, and re-evaluates her future: she will not be going to a finishing school in Switzerland and she bitterly recalls her cruel treatment of her father. She leaves the school and later writes to Darrell, showing a very different side:

I shall never be as strong-minded as you, Darrell - or Sally - or Bill and Clarissa - but I don't think I'll ever again be as weak and selfish as I was. You see - it wasn't too late after all. And that has made a lot of difference to me. I feel as if I've been given another chance.

The term draws to a close. In an emotional ending, Alicia takes June by the shoulders and asks her to carry on and hold the standard high. Startled, June agrees. Unprompted, Felicity makes the same promise to Darrell.

== Style and themes ==
When she thought of her father Gwen covered her eyes in shame and remorse. “I never even said good-bye!” she cried out loudly, startling Miss Winter and Miss Grayling. “I never—even—said—good-bye! And I didn’t write when I knew he was ill. Now it’s too late.”

Too late! What dreadful words. Too late to say she was sorry, too late to be loving, too late to be good and kind.

“I said cruel things, I hurt him—oh, Miss Winter, why didn’t you stop me?” cried Gwen, her face white and her eyes tearless. Tears had always been so easy to Gwen—but now they wouldn’t come.

The final book brings the main characters' story arcs to a conclusion. Minor characters such as Mavis and Catherine have either left the school or, in the case of Daphne, have disappeared from the narrative.

The Second Form is more prominent in this book, with Darrell and most of the other Sixth Formers having little to do beyond reacting to Gwen's latest display of selfishness. New girl Suzanne, Mam'zelle Rougier's niece, is developed minimally as a character and serves mainly as a means for Blyton's recurring trope of a French character mispronouncing English words, reminiscent of the more successful Claudine in the earlier St. Clares series.

There is a "pride before a fall" theme to the final book. Amanda, Jo and Gwendoline are all boastful and unpleasant in their various ways. Gwen is particularly obnoxious in this story, prompting Miss Grayling to predict that a terrible punishment awaits her.

The portrayal of the Jones family is an example of the class bias for which Blyton was frequently criticised. Mr Jones is depicted as loud, boorish and implicitly a self made nouveau riche barrow boy, while his wife is depicted as tastelessly "dripping in diamonds." The normally exemplary Headmistress, Miss Grayling, discusses confidential details concerning Jo Jones with other parents in a way that would be unlikely to be appropriate even in 1951:

"It was an experiment, taking Jo - but I'm afraid it's not an experiment that's going to work out well. We've had other experiments before, as you know - taking girls that don't really fit in, hoping they will, later. And so far they always have done, in a marvellous way. I think Jo would too, if only she got a little backing from her parents. But Jo's father always undoes any good we do here for Jo!"

In Jo's case, the role her father plays in her downfall is definite. They depart the school changed by their experiences and all three girls undergo redemption arcs. Letters from both Jo and Gwendoline after their departures are contrite and warmly written, suggesting positive developments in both of their lives.

== Characters ==
=== North Tower Sixth Form girls ===
- Darrell Rivers - the main protagonist of the stories, head girl of Malory Towers North Tower. She is kind and sensible.
- Sally Hope - Darrell's best friend, solid and dependable. She is the games captain.
- Gwendoline Mary Lacey - spoiled, lazy, boastful and conceited. Mean and selfish. She only befriends people who are rich, gifted, or special.
- Alicia Johns - lively and quick-witted, always ready with a sharp-tongued opinion in a comical way.
- Mary-Lou - now taller, but still timid.
- Maureen Little - new girl the last term, following the closure of her old school, often called ‘Measly Manor’ by the girls and often referred as Gwendoline’s twin.
- Moira Linton - hard and domineering, not very likeable. She is the head girl in "In the Fifth at Malory Towers"
- Wilhelmina (Bill) Robinson - Obsessed with horses and particularly her own horse, "Thunder"
- Clarissa Carter - Bill's best friend who also likes horses and adores her own horse ‘Merrylegs’.
- Irene - a scatterbrained girl who excels at music and mathematics.
- Belinda Morris - Irene's best friend, equally scatterbrained, but a talented artist.
- Amanda Chartelow - new girl, tall and physically strong with ambitions to compete in the Olympic Games. Rather conceited and haughty but while doing sports had a grace of a big animal.
- Suzanne - A French girl who is also the niece of Mam’zelle Rougier who is small-built and doesn't like swimming.

=== Other girls ===
- Betty Hill - Alicia's friend in West Tower
- Felicity Rivers - Darrell's younger sister.
- June Johns- Alicia's cousin, in the Second Form
- Susan - Felicity's best friend.
- Josephine Jones - spoilt and selfish in the Second Form
- Deidre - friend of Jo in the First Form

=== Mistresses and Staff ===
- Miss Grayling - Headmistress of Malory Towers.
- Miss Potts - House Mistress of North Tower and mistress of the First Form.
- Miss Oakes - Sixth Form mistress
- Miss Peters - Third Form mistress
- Miss Parker - Second Form mistress
- Mam'zelle Dupont - French mistress, described as "short, fat and round," with a jolly temperament
- Mam'zelle Rougier - French mistress, described as "thin and sour," with an ill-humoured temperament
- Matron - North Tower Matron, responsible for the well-being of the girls boarding in North Tower

=== Other characters ===
- Mr Rivers - Darrell's father, a surgeon
- Mrs Rivers - Darrell's mother
- Mrs Lacey - Gwendoline's mother
- Miss Winter - Gwendoline's former governess
- Charlie Jones - Jo's father. Wealthy, vulgar and has a "fog horn" voice
- Mrs Jones - Jo's mother. Embarrassed by her husband, but "dripping" with jewellery.
- Dr and Mrs Leyton - parents.
