= First Term at Malory Towers =

1947 book by Enid Blyton

- 1946 UK 1st Edition dustjacket
- Author: Enid Blyton
- Illustrator: Stanley Lloyd
- Cover artist: Stanley Lloyd
- Language: English
- Series: Malory Towers
- Genre: School story
- Publisher: Methuen (UK)
- Publication date: 1947
- Publication place: United Kingdom
- Media type: Print (hardback & paperback)
- ISBN: 0 7497 1924 9 (first edition, hardback)
- Preceded by: none
- Followed by: The Second Form at Malory Towers

First Term at Malory Towers is the first Malory Towers book by Enid Blyton. The book introduces the main characters including Darrell Rivers, Sally Hope, Mary-Lou, Alicia Johns, Gwendoline Mary Lacey, and teachers such as Miss Potts and Miss Grayling.

== Plot summary ==
Twelve year old Darrell Rivers travels by train to the first year at her new boarding school, Malory Towers. She quickly befriends several of the girls in her dormitory, including lively Alicia and artistic but scatter-brained Irene, though she has trouble getting along with the spoilt Gwendoline and the withdrawn and unfriendly Sally Hope.

Gwendoline, in particular, tests Darrell's temper, especially when she takes advantage of shy Mary-Lou's fear of swimming by holding her down in the water. Darrell rushes in to rescue Mary-Lou and slaps Gwendoline and even flares up at the head-girl Katherine, for not punishing people like Gwendoline. Mary-Lou becomes devoted to Darrell, becoming annoying with her efforts to become friends. Later though, Darrell attempts to boost Mary-Lou's self-confidence by pretending to have difficulties in the water and allowing herself to be saved by Mary-Lou.

During the half-term break, Darrell asks Sally if she would like to spend the day with her and her parents, but is turned down. Later, when Darrell asks Sally about her baby sister, Sally denies having one. Their conversation quickly becomes an argument and Darrell pushes Sally to the ground. The next morning Sally is seriously ill and Darrell begins to worry that she caused Sally's illness by pushing her. A doctor is called to see Sally and it happens to be Darrell's father, Dr Rivers, who is nearby after the half-term holiday. Things are sorted out when Darrell's father explains that he came to operate on Sally and says it was not Darrell who made Sally ill. Sally admits to Darrell she does have a sister, but pretended she didn't because she was jealous of sharing her mother with the baby. Darrell and Sally become friends when Darrell shares her own experiences of being a big sister.

Gwendoline becomes increasingly envious of Darrell's growing popularity and decides to ruin her reputation. She destroys Mary-Lou's favourite pen and smears ink on Darrell's shoes to frame her. Darrell's denials are not believed by most of the other first-formers, who recall her fierce temper. Even Alicia, with whom Darrell wants to be best friends, does not believe her. Only Sally and Mary-Lou herself stand by Darrell. Determined to help Darrell, Mary-Lou collects evidence (Gwen's inky shoes) to show that Gwen broke her pen, satisfying the first-formers and proving Darrell's innocence. Term ends with Darrell turning down Alicia's friendship to be with Sally and Mary-Lou. She leaves by train with Sally, promising she'll be back at Malory Towers next term.

== Characters ==
=== North Tower First Form girls ===
- Darrell Rivers - a new girl at Malory Towers and the main protagonist of the stories. She has long brown hair and is jolly and sensible.
- Gwendoline Mary Lacey - another new girl, who turns out to be spoiled, lazy, boastful and spiteful. She is described as having blonde hair and blue eyes.
- Sally Hope - the third new girl, initially prim and withdrawn.
- Alicia Johns - a lively, quick-witted prankster, always ready with an opinion. Alicia is often criticised for her sharp and sometimes needlessly harsh tongue.
- Mary-Lou Linnet - a quiet, shy girl, described as having "big, scared eyes". At the end of the story she learns to stand up for herself.
- Katherine - the Head-Girl of the First Form, tall, dark and quietly spoken. She is kind and sensible.
- Emily Lake - a quiet and studious girl, clever at sewing.
- Irene Edwards - a scatterbrained girl who excels at music and mathematics.
- Jean Dunlop - a jolly, shrewd Scottish girl, able at handling money for various school societies and charities.
- Violet Dawson - described as shy and colourless, very much left out of things.

=== Other girls ===
- Betty Hill - Alicia's friend in West Tower.
- Pamela - Head-Girl of North Tower.
- Marilyn - Sixth former, captain of games.

=== Mistresses and Staff ===
- Miss Grayling - Headmistress of Malory Towers.
- Miss Potts - House Mistress of North Tower and mistress of the First Form.
- Mam'zelle Dupont - French mistress, described as "short, fat and round," with a jolly temperament. She is the victim of many tricks and pranks by Alicia and the other first formers.
- Mam'zelle Rougier - French mistress, described as "thin and sour," with an ill-humoured temperament.
- Miss Linnie - Art mistress.
- Mr Young - Music teacher.
- Miss Carton - History mistress.
- Miss Remmington - Games mistress.
- Matron - responsible for the well-being of the girls boarding in North Tower. She is warm and kind, but can be very stern about the girls taking their medicine and them acting appropriately.

=== Other characters ===
- Mr Rivers - Darrell's father, a surgeon.
- Mrs Rivers - Darrell's mother.
- Felicity Rivers - Darrell's younger sister.
- Mrs Lacey - Gwendoline's mother.
- Miss Winter - Gwendoline's former governess.
- Mr Hope - Sally's father.
- Mrs Hope - Sally's mother.
