= End of Term =

1959 book by Antonia Forest

- First edition
- Author: Antonia Forest
- Language: English
- Publisher: Faber and Faber
- Publication date: 1959
- Publication place: United Kingdom
- Media type: Print (hardback & paperback)
- Pages: 238 pp (hardback edition)
- ISBN: 0-571-05707-1 (hardback edition)
- Preceded by: Falconer's Lure
- Followed by: Peter's Room

End of Term is a book by British children's author Antonia Forest, published in 1959. End of Term is the fourth Marlow book, between Falconer's Lure and Peter's Room.

== Plot introduction ==
The Marlow sisters, less Karen and Rowan, return for another term at Kingscote School for Girls. As the title suggests, the focus of this book is on the "End of Term" activities, particularly the Christmas Play performed in Wade Minster. Skullduggery over the netball team and a visit from their frightening Grandmother make this a less than enjoyable term for Nicola Marlow.

== Plot summary ==
Nicola's merlin, the Sprog, makes off from the train when she is on her way back to school, taking a sparrow for the first time in his life. Returning to the station, she finds a new girl, Esther Frewen. Esther's parents are divorced and have sent her to boarding school because she doesn't quite fit in their new lives. She is not too worried about this, but mainly about leaving her puppy, Daks, behind.

A few weeks into term, Nicola, along with most of the school, is shocked to find that she has been left out of the Junior Netball team. In fact, this is the work of Lois Sanger, Nicola's old enemy and now school Games Captain. She is a soloist in the Christmas Play, but does not find this much consolation.

Half-term is less fun than expected, mainly because Mrs Marlow's mother is visiting. Nicola and Patrick manage to sneak off for a day to visit Wade Minster and look at the carved falcon and then enjoy a cold, dark ride back over the downs, while Patrick recites the Lyke-Wake Dirge.

Back at school, Nicola finds that she has been given the part of Shepherd Boy in the Christmas Play, the part Lawrie desperately wanted. Lawrie thinks this is treachery on a grand scale. However, when she falls and hurts her leg so that she cannot play in a netball match, she finds a possible solution. Nicola agrees to pretend to be Lawrie so that she can play in the match - which they win comfortably. Lawrie is now convinced that somehow she will be the Shepherd Boy.

On the day of the Play, Esther (who is now supposed to be singing Nicola's solos) disappears, leaving a note for Nicola. She has gone home to prevent her mother getting rid of Daks. Nicola, Lawrie, and their friends Tim and Miranda agree that Nicola should go back to singing and Lawrie will act. Miranda, despite being Jewish, agrees to fill the spare place in the procession.

There is a huge fuss at the Minster when the staff realise what has happened and there will clearly be "blood for breakfast" before too long. However, no-one can think of a better plan. Everyone, including Grandmother and Patrick, is amazed by Nicola's singing and Lawrie's acting. Ginty and Ann play Gabriel and Mary respectively, causing Mrs Marlow a certain embarrassment when she realises how much her family have dominated the production.
