= Third Year at Malory Towers =

Novel by Enid Blyton

- 1948 UK 1st Edition dustjacket
- Author: Enid Blyton
- Illustrator: Stanley Lloyd
- Cover artist: Stanley Lloyd
- Language: English
- Series: Malory Towers
- Genre: School story
- Publisher: Methuen (UK)
- Publication date: 1948
- Publication place: United Kingdom
- Media type: Print (hardback & paperback)
- ISBN: 0 7497 1926 5 (first edition, hardback)
- Preceded by: The Second Form at Malory Towers
- Followed by: Upper Fourth at Malory Towers

Third Year at Malory Towers is a novel by Enid Blyton set in an English girls' boarding school. It is the third book in the Malory Towers school story series. The novel was first published in 1948.

== Plot summary ==
Darrell is on the way to Malory Towers once again. Sally Hope, her best friend, is in quarantine for mumps and will be late arriving at the school. On the way, they collect a new girl, Zerelda Brass, an American girl who has been staying with her English grandmother. Although only fifteen, Zerelda appears older, wearing makeup and lipstick, with her hair styled in an extravagant fashion. Darrell excitedly talks about Malory Towers on the journey and is indignant when she discovers that Zerelda has fallen asleep.

When they arrive at the school, the other girls are shocked at Zerelda's makeup and hair, having never seen anyone like her. The single exception is Gwendoline, who is overcome with admiration. Zerelda is placed in North Tower, but in the Fourth Form, one form higher than Darrell and her friends. On her first day, the Fourth Form mistress, Miss Williams, initially mistakes her for a new member of the teaching staff. Upon realising that Zerelda is a new girl, Miss Williams orders her to remove her makeup and rearrange her hair.

Meanwhile, tensions rise between Mavis, who had arrived at Malory Towers the previous term, and the other girls in the Third Form. Mavis is described as lazy and selfish. She has a strong, deep singing voice, but she incessantly boasts about her future career as an opera singer and ignores all other conversation. Jean, a practical and forthright Scottish girl who is now head of the Third Form, has little patience with Mavis, and the other girls regard her as all voice and vanity.

The following day another new girl, Wilhelmina Robinson, arrives. She is on horseback and is accompanied by her seven brothers, also on horseback. Wilhelmina, who has never attended school before, explains that she is always known as Bill and is looking forward to riding her horse Thunder every day, even if it means missing some lessons. Her horse obsession soon leads to disagreements and confrontations with the Third Form mistress, Miss Peters, even though Miss Peters is a keen horsewoman herself. Soon Bill is banned altogether from seeing Thunder in the stables.

Zerelda struggles with the standard of work in the Fourth Form and is moved to the Third Form. She handles the move with dignity, but is inwardly humiliated. As she has aspirations to become a film actress, she consoles herself with a belief that she has outstanding acting ability - but even this belief is crushed when drama teacher Ms Hibbert tells her she is unable to act.

Mavis is excited to discover a talent show in the nearby town of Billington. She imagines herself on stage, hearing thunderous applause. Ignoring the advice of the other girls, she travels to the talent show. But she is not permitted to perform, and after missing the last bus home, spends much of the night outside in a rainstorm. When she is finally found, she is suffering from bronchitis and has lost her voice - possibly irreparably. Zerelda comforts Mavis, drawing on the experience of her acting failure. The two become close friends.

Meanwhile, Bill has been disregarding her ban from the stables. Thunder, her horse, is suffering from colic and Darrell, while searching for Mavis, discovers Bill in the stables tending to him. Darrell enlists the help of Miss Peters, who sets off on horseback to bring back the vet. Thunder recovers and a grateful Bill sees Miss Peters in a new light.

The term finishes with Darrell being picked for the school lacrosse team, and shooting the winning goal.

== Characters ==
=== North Tower Third Form girls ===
- Darrell Rivers - The main protagonist of the stories. She has a hot temper, but is warm and kind.
- Sally Hope - Darrell's best friend, described as sensible, solid, and dependable.
- Gwendoline Mary Lacey - spoiled, lazy, boastful and conceited. She does not really have a special friend, so she befriends Zerelda, leaving Mavis alone.
- Alicia Johns - lively and quick-witted, always ready with a sharp-tongued remark. She is the form trickster.
- Jean Dunlop - A Scottish girl, now head of the third form; shrewd, honest, and dependable.
- Mary-Lou Linnet - now a little taller, but still timid and scared-looking.
- Wilhelmina (Bill) Robinson - a new girl, obsessed with horses and particularly her own horse, Thunder. Always thinking of Thunder in class and doesn't listen to anything that is said.
- Zerelda Brass - a new girl from America. Looks much older than her peers, despite being the same age, due to her hair and makeup.
- Irene - a scatterbrained girl who excels at music and mathematics.
- Belinda Morris - Irene's best friend, equally scatterbrained; described as a talented artist.
- Mavis - arrived since the last book, a highly talented singer but otherwise conceited and lacking in character.
- Daphne Millicent Turner - pretty, graceful and charming, now much more subdued than when she first arrived. Mary-Lou's best friend.

=== Other girls ===
- Betty Hill - Alicia's best friend in West Tower, they usually think of pranks together.
- Molly Ronaldson - school games captain. Described as one of the finest school captains they had.
- Lucy - Head Girl of the Fourth Form.
- Ellen Wilson - arrived as a new girl in the Second Form with Daphne and Belinda, now in the Fourth Form.

=== Mistresses and Staff ===
- Miss Grayling - Headmistress of Malory Towers.
- Miss Potts - House Mistress of North Tower and mistress of the First Form.
- Miss Peters - Third Form mistress
- Miss Williams - Fourth Form mistress
- Mam'zelle Dupont - French mistress, described as "short, fat and round," with a jolly temperament. Alicia and Betty often play tricks on her.
- Mam'zelle Rougier - French mistress, described as "thin and sour," with an ill-humoured temperament. Nobody dares to disobey her.
- Miss Linnie - art mistress, young and jolly.
- Mr Young - music teacher, rather hot tempered.
- Miss Carton - history mistress.
- Miss Hibbert - English and drama mistress.
- Miss Donnelly - Sewing mistress.
- Matron - North Tower Matron, responsible for the North Tower girls' wellbeing. She could be kind and motherly, but also bossy, and if anyone was pretending to be sick she would give them a dose of nasty-tasting medicine.

=== Other characters ===
- Mr Rivers - Darrell's father, a surgeon
- Mrs Rivers - Darrell's mother
- Felicity Rivers - Darrell's younger sister
- Mrs Lacey - Gwendoline's mother
- Miss Winter - Gwendoline's former governess
- Mr Raglett - farmer
- Mr Turnbull - veterinary surgeon
