= In the Fifth at Malory Towers =

Book by Enid Blyton

- First edition dust jacket
- Author: Enid Blyton
- Illustrator: Stanley Lloyd
- Language: English
- Genre: School story
- Publisher: Methuen (UK)
- Publication date: 1950
- Publication place: United Kingdom
- Media type: Print (hardback & paperback)
- Preceded by: Upper Fourth at Malory Towers
- Followed by: Last Term at Malory Towers

In the Fifth at Malory Towers is a novel in the school story genre written by Enid Blyton. It is the fifth book in her Malory Towers series and, like other books in the series, follows Darrell Rivers at the eponymous girls' boarding school.

== Plot summary ==
Darrell Rivers, now in the Fifth Form, and her younger sister Felicity return to Malory Towers. Darrell is relieved to have passed her School Certificate examination, along with most of her friends.

Alicia and Gwendoline also move to the Fifth Form, despite failing the exam, while Connie remains in the Upper Fourth, separated from her twin Ruth. Other newcomers are Moira Linton and Catherine Gray, who both remain in the Fifth from the previous year. To the girls’ discomfort, the domineering Moira becomes Head Girl of the Form.

Darrell is appointed as Fifth Form Head of Games, responsible for organising practice times for the lower school and assisting the games mistresses in coaching. However, when Darrell is consulted on team selections and favours Felicity, her younger sister, she faces accusations of favouritism.

New girl Maureen Little joins the Fifth Form after the closure of her old school, Mazely Manor. Her vain character, along with her long and tedious stories about her former school swiftly irritates the other girls. When Mam’zelle mistakenly refers to the school as “Measley Manor,” the girls delight in repeating her mistake in Maureen's hearing.

Maureen is encouraged by the girls to befriend Gwendoline, who realises with horror that Maureen's self-centred character and behaviour is very much akin to her own.

After confiscating some tricks booklets from June, Mam'zelle buys a set of hideous trick teeth, which she uses for her own "treek" - displaying a ghastly and sinister smile around the school. Despite the disapproval of other mistresses, Mam'zelle's popularity with the girls soars.

The Fifth Form is tasked with designing and performing the Christmas school entertainment. They decide it should be a pantomime to allow everyone to participate. Darrell is the lead co-writer, while Irene composes the music and Belinda designs the show. Gwendoline and Maureen are both hopeful of being cast in the lead role of Cinderella, but the part goes to Mary-Lou. Other castings include Alicia as the Demon King, Bill as the Baron and Mavis as the Prince.

Moira appoints herself as one of the co-producers, and her hard and dominating personality causes many problems, culminating in Alicia's resignation from the production. Soon after, in an unpleasant episode, Moira receives a series of spiteful and anonymous letters, and dreads the possibility that the sender may be her younger sister Bridget, in the Fourth Form. When the real culprit is revealed to be Alicia's cousin June, Moira intervenes to save her from expulsion. A grateful Alicia withdraws her resignation.

At the end, Cinderella is performed to an audience of parents and the rest of the school, to tumultuous applause. The show is a triumph and Darrell savours the success of her first play.

== Characters ==
=== North Tower Fifth Form girls ===
- Darrell Rivers - the main protagonist of the stories. She is the games captain this term, and lead writer of the pantomime
- Sally Hope - Darrell's best friend, solid and dependable. She is co-writer of the pantomime with Darrell.
- Gwendoline Mary Lacey - spoiled, lazy, boastful, selfish and conceited. Maureen clings onto her.
- Alicia Johns - lively and quick-witted, always ready with a sharp-tongued opinion.
- Mary-Lou - now taller, but still timid.
- Maureen Little - new girl following the closure of her old school. Very alike to Gwendoline; conceited, boastful and spoilt. Not very attractive.She has teeth that are sticking out, like a bunny.
- Moira Linton - hard and domineering, Fifth Form Head Girl. She was not very likeable, and described as a ‘dictator’.
- Catherine Gray - stays in the Fifth Form from the previous year. Tries to please the girls but only annoys them. The girls call her a doormat and a saint.
- Wilhelmina (Bill) Robinson - still obsessed with horses and particularly her own horse, Thunder.
- Clarissa Carter - Bill's best friend. Loves horses just like Bill- and has her own horse, called Merrylegs.
- Irene - a scatterbrained girl who excels at music and mathematics. Can play quite a good game of lacrosse .
- Belinda Morris - Irene's best friend, equally scatterbrained, a very talented artist. Fair at other subjects.
- Mavis Allyson - a highly talented singer, much improved since her earlier appearances.
- Daphne Millicent Turner - pretty, graceful and charming, now much more subdued than when she first arrived. Best friend of Mary-Lou.
- Ruth Batten - Shy and timid- like a shadow of her twin sister.

=== Other girls ===
- Betty Hill - Alicia's friend in West Tower
- Felicity Rivers - Darrell's younger sister, in the First Form
- June Johns - Alicia's cousin, in the First Form.
- Susan Blake - Felicity's best friend in the First Form.
- Bridget - Moira's younger sister in the Fourth Form.
- Janet - fifth form girl who was too young to go up to the sixt form. Very good at sewing.
- Connie Batten - Ruth’s twin. Connie is taller and fatter and is bolder than Ruth. She always speaks up for Ruth. She stays in the upper fourth as she failed School Cert so she no longer can speak for Ruth.

=== Mistresses and Staff ===
- Miss Grayling - Headmistress of Malory Towers.
- Miss Potts - House Mistress of North Tower and mistress of the First Form.
- Miss James - Fifth Form mistress
- Miss Williams - Fourth Form mistress
- Mam'zelle Dupont - French mistress, described as "short, fat and round," with a jolly temperament
- Mam'zelle Rougier - French mistress, described as "thin and sour," with an ill-humoured temperament
- Miss Linnie - sewing mistress
- Pop - school handyman
- Matron - North Tower Matron, responsible for the well-being of the girls boarding in North Tower

=== Other characters ===
- Mr Rivers - Darrell's father, a surgeon
- Mrs Rivers - Darrell's mother
- Mrs Lacey - Gwendoline's mother
- Miss Winter - Gwendoline's former governess
- Mrs Jennings - parent
- Mrs Petton - parent
