= The Thuggery Affair =

1965 book by Antonia Forest

- First edition
- Author: Antonia Forest
- Language: English
- Publisher: Faber and Faber
- Publication date: 1965
- Publication place: United Kingdom
- Media type: Print (hardback & paperback)
- ISBN: 0571113303 (paperback edition)
- Preceded by: Peter's Room
- Followed by: The Ready-Made Family

The Thuggery Affair is the sixth in a series of novels about the modern Marlow family by children's author Antonia Forest, first published in 1965. It is preceded by Peter's Room and succeeded by The Ready-Made Family.

== Plot introduction ==
The Thuggery Affair is unusual in terms of the wider Marlow saga, in being a boy-dominated story. The main characters are Peter and Lawrie Marlow and their friend and neighbour Patrick Merrick. Nicola, the usual heroine of the series, is visiting her friend Miranda in London and Ginty is visiting her French grandmother. The action is set mainly in Colebridge, the nearest town to the Marlow family's home at Trennels, during spring half-term.

== Plot summary ==
Miss Maudie Culver, a local landowner, employs a gang of juvenile delinquents to help her look after her pigeons. Patrick Merrick incurs her wrath when his falcon kills two of the birds. Peter notices that one of the pigeons is carrying a drug capsule. Patrick sneaks into Miss Culver's dovecote (a huge stone edifice) but is apprehended by the thugs. A scuffle breaks out, a gang member is stabbed to death and the thugs flee. Jukie, the gang leader, requisitions Miss Culver's car and attempts to escape, taking Patrick with him. They discuss Catholicism, Jukie's childhood and the H-bomb. The car swerves as Patrick attempts to stop them hitting a police roadblock. Jukie is killed when the car hits a tree but Patrick is thrown clear.

== Reception ==
The Thuggery Affair was relatively unsuccessful compared to other books in the series, being printed in only one hardback and one paperback edition during Forest's lifetime; it was finally reprinted by Girls Gone By in 2005. Forest explained that the book was 'written during that long-dead period when teenagers talked self-invented languages, incomprehensible to any other age-group. Unfortunately, I think I was the only person who did understand what my characters were saying.'
