= The Second Form at Malory Towers =

Novel by Enid Blyton

- 1947 UK 1st Edition dustjacket
- Author: Enid Blyton
- Illustrator: Stanley Lloyd
- Cover artist: Stanley Lloyd
- Language: English
- Series: Malory Towers
- Genre: School story
- Publisher: Methuen (UK)
- Publication date: 1947
- Publication place: United Kingdom
- Media type: Print (Hardback & Paperback)
- ISBN: 0 7497 1925 7 (first edition, hardback)
- Preceded by: First Term at Malory Towers
- Followed by: Third Year at Malory Towers

The Second Form at Malory Towers is a novel by Enid Blyton set in an English boarding school. It is the second book in the Malory Towers school story series. The novel was published in 1947 by Methuen Publishing. The first edition was illustrated by Stanley Lloyd, both the dust jacket and the inner illustrations. It has been reprinted 20 times, the most recent being in 2019.

== Plot ==
It is Darrell's fifth term at Malory Towers. Along with most of her classmates, she moves up to the Second Form under Form Mistress Miss Parker. Former Head of Form, Katherine, has moved up to the Third Form and Violet has disappeared from the stories. In their place in North Tower are three new girls: Belinda Morris, Ellen Wilson and Daphne Milicent Turner.

Belinda turns out to be as much of a scatterbrain as Irene and the two are instantly drawn to each other, to the despair of their teachers. Her new schoolfriends, on the other hand, are delighted to discover Belinda's talent for drawing, enabling her to trade many of her chores in return for caricatures of teachers. The reader is given an early hint that Daphne may not be all she seems. On the face of it she is pretty, charming and talks of having a very wealthy family. Gwendoline, vain and snobbish as ever, claims her for a friend.

Ellen is a scholarship girl. A running theme of the book is her increasing bad temper, caused by her worrying about succeeding at Malory Towers and overworking. Sally, now the Head of Form, asks Jean to try and befriend Ellen and help her settle down, but her efforts are rejected. As the term moves on, Ellen becomes increasingly irritable and unwell, and eventually has to spend eleven days in the sanatorium. This makes things worse for her as she worries about missing lessons and falling further behind.

A feud develops between the two Mam’zelles. Each has different ideas about which girls should be cast in two French plays, with Mam’zelle Dupont favouring Daphne and Mam’zelle Rougier having entirely different ideas. Belinda is inspired to draw a set of unkind caricatures of Mam’zelle Rougier, which the French mistress unfortunately sees. Mam’zelle storms off to complain to Miss Grayling, prompting the Second Formers to send a delegation to follow her and apologise. Matters are resolved when Mam'zelle Dupont intervenes, proclaiming her warm friendship with Mam'zelle Rougier and accepting her views on the casting for the French plays.

Meanwhile, Ellen continues to worry about her work and is frustrated when her requests for extra tuition are refused. In despair, she has the idea of cheating by viewing the examination questions in advance. At the same time, personal possessions are going missing. Emily loses a brooch, Katie loses a necklace and Gwen, Mary-Lou and Betty all lose purses. Alicia remembers finding Ellen rummaging in Miss Parker's desk and begins to suspect Ellen of being the thief. She shares her suspicions with the other girls and publicly challenges Ellen.

Ellen is shocked at the accusation. Having almost decided to abandon her cheating idea, she is overcome with anger and decides that, if the others believe her to be bad, then she may as well be bad. She sneaks downstairs, but disturbs Darrell who follows her and finds her with the exam papers. Darrell loses her temper and a struggle ensues. Darrell accuses Ellen of being a thief and a cheat. After this encounter, Ellen becomes sick with worry and seeks out Matron, who places her in the Sanatorium. In the morning, the other girls believe Ellen has been expelled.

Mary-Lou offers to post a parcel for Daphne and sets off for the post office on a windy, stormy night. She does not return and Daphne sets off to find her. A search party is sent out and both Daphne and Mary Lou are found, clinging to the edge of a cliff. Daphne had prevented Mary-Lou from falling and is regarded as a heroine.

Darrell, Sally, Irene and Belinda set off the next day to find Daphne's parcel. It contains the missing purses and jewellery. They report to Miss Grayling and Daphne is revealed as the thief. Miss Grayling is surprised at the girls' belief that Ellen has been expelled and realises there is a problem with Ellen that needs to be resolved.

Miss Grayling speaks to Daphne. She tells her that she has received confidential reports from her previous schools and knows she has a history of stealing and lying about her family's wealth. However, Miss Grayling also tells Daphne that, by her actions, she has proved she has good in her. Miss Grayling makes Daphne an offer: if she is to remain at Malory Towers, she must confess everything to the Second Form girls and ask for their support to remain. Daphne does so. The girls decide that Daphne's heroism has earned her another chance. Miss Grayling speaks to Ellen and is relieved that overwork is at the root of her problems.

The term comes to a close, with Mary-Lou and Daphne now firm friends.

== Characters ==
=== North Tower Second Form girls ===
- Darrell Rivers – The main protagonist of the stories. She has long brown hair and is jolly and sensible. Is Sally's best friend.
- Gwendoline Mary Lacey – Another girl who turns out to be spoiled, lazy, boastful and spiteful. She is described as having blonde hair and blue eyes. She is also known for always being silly about somebody
- Sally Hope – Initially prim and withdrawn, but now is sensible, kind, dependable and Darrell's best friend.
- Alicia Johns – A lively, quick-witted prankster, always ready with an opinion. Alicia is often criticized for her sharp and sometimes needlessly harsh tongue.
- Mary Lou Linnet – A quiet, shy girl, but she has found a new friend at the end of the second form. Her name is Daphne Millicent Turner.
- Emily Lake – A quiet and studious girl, clever at sewing.
- Irene Edwards – A scatterbrained girl who excels at music, mathematics and could play quite a good game of lacrosse.
- Jean Dunlop – A jolly, shrewd Scottish girl, able at handling money for various school societies and charities.
- Violet Dawson – Described as shy and colourless, very much left out of things.
- Belinda Morris – a new girl, described as having black curly hair, cut short like a boy. Marvellous at painting and sketching.She is very like Irene, so they are immediately lured to each other.
- Ellen Wilson – a new girl who is described as tall and thin. A scholarship girl, who is smart but often worries about her work. In the end, she and Jean become firm friends.
- Daphne Millicent Turner – pretty, graceful and charming. She has curly blonde hair. She is friends with Gwendoline Mary Lacey for a while, but then becomes best friends with Mary-Lou.

=== Other girls ===
- Betty Hill – Alicia's best friend in West Tower. They could not be put together, much to their disgust.
- Marilyn – Sixth former, captain of games. People often described her as one of the best games captain.

=== Mistresses and Staff ===
- Miss Grayling – Headmistress of Malory Towers.
- Miss Potts – House Mistress of North Tower and mistress of the First Form.
- Mam'zelle Dupont – French mistress, described as "short, fat and round," with a jolly temperament. She is the victim of many tricks and pranks by Alicia and the other Second formers.
- Mam'zelle Rougier – French mistress, described as "thin and sour," with an ill-humoured temperament, unlike the other Mam’zelle. Most people are scared of her and obey her.
- Miss Linnie – Art mistress
- Mr Young – Music teacher
- Miss Carton – History mistress
- Miss Remmington – Games mistress
- Matron – North Tower Matron, responsible for the well-being of the girls boarding in North Tower. She is warm and kind, but can be very stern about the girls taking their medicine.

=== Other characters ===
- Mr Rivers – Darrell's father, a surgeon.
- Mrs Rivers – Darrell's mother.
- Felicity Rivers – Darrell's younger sister.
- Mrs Lacey – Gwendoline's mother.
- Miss Winter – Gwendoline's former governess.
- Mr Hope – Sally's father.
- Mrs Hope – Sally's mother.
- Gardener – described as a "hefty gardener," a member of the search party sent to find Daphne and Mary-Lou
