= James Harwood Panting =

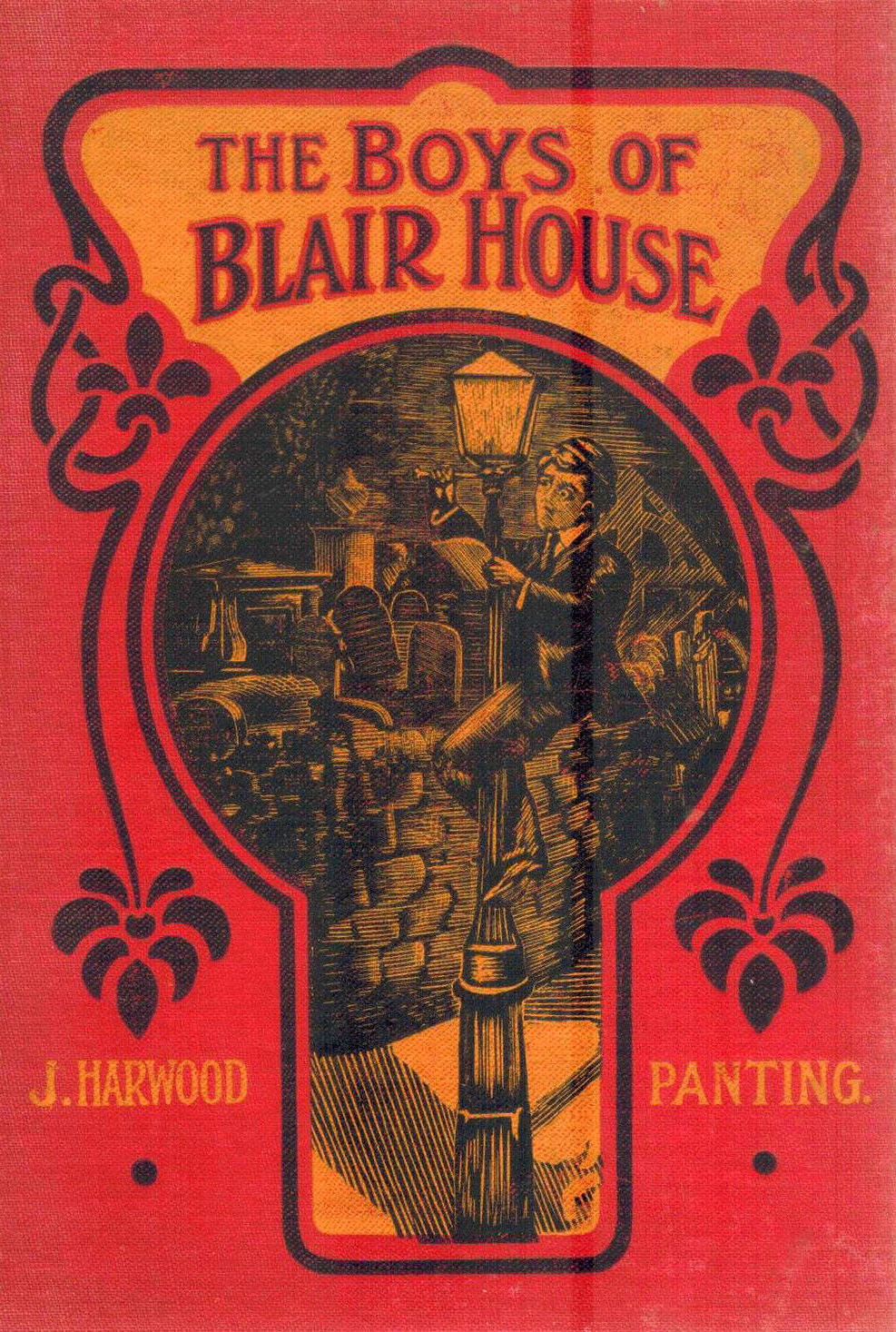
The cover of The Boys Of Blair House. Sunday Circle, 1904.

James Harwood Panting (1854 - 1924) was a British writer who specialised in school stories for boys. He was the editor of Young Folks and a member of the editorial staff of the South London Press.

== Early life ==
Panting was born in Charlton, Kent, in 1854.

== Family ==
Panting married Bertha Emily Alais in 1883 and they had sons Ray and Arnold and daughters Ruth and Phyllis. A son Cyril is recorded in the 1891 census but not in 1911. At the time of the 1891 census the family were living at 67 Ballater Road, Brixton, London. George B. Hicklenton, a printer's reader, was lodging with them.

By the time of the 1911 census the family were at 47 Beechdale, Brixton Hill, London. All the children were born in Brixton. Both Arnold and Phyllis became journalists, Phyllis as the noted women's magazine editor Phyllis Digby Morton. The family employed one servant. In 1921, The Literary Year-Book gave an address for Panting of The Shack, Melrose Avenue, Norbury, London SW19.

== Writing ==
After earlier literary works and two adult novels, Panting specialised in boys school stories. As Claud Heathcote he contributed stories to The Boys' Friend in 1895 and The Union Jack in 1898.

== Death ==
Panting died in the Croydon district of Surrey in 1924.

== Selected publications ==
- The Poetical Works of Leigh Hunt and Thomas Hood. Scott, 1889. (Editor)
- Through the Crucible (a novel). S.W. Partridge, London, 1898.
- The Vicar's Atonement. Horace Marshall, London, 1900.
- The Boys of Blair House. Amalgamated Press, 1904.
- Clive of Clair College. Warne, London, 1905.
- The Hero of Garside School. Warne, London, 1906.
- The Two Runaways. Warne, London, 1907.
- True All Through. Chambers, London & Edinburgh, 1909.
