= Phyllis Digby Morton =

British fashion journalist

Phyllis Digby Morton as she appeared in Woman's Own, 1956.

Phyllis May Digby-Morton, born Phyllis May Panting, (1901 – 28 April 1984) was a British fashion journalist who was the innovative editor of Woman and Beauty. During the Second World War, she survived an attack by a German U-boat on a ship on which she and her husband were travelling.

== Early life ==
Phyllis Panting was the daughter of James Harwood Panting, a writer of school stories for boys, and Bertha Emily Panting. She was born in Brixton, London, in 1901 where she lived at the family home of 47 Beechdale, Brixton Hill with her parents, her sister Ruth and her brothers Ray and Arnold. Panting was educated at St Paul's Girls' School, and her early career was in the BBC drama department where she wrote scripts and acted. She was a member of the London Radio Repertory Players in the 1920s. By the late 1920s Panting was in journalism and editor of the children's paper My Favourite.

== Marriage ==
In 1917, a Phyllis M. Panting married a Noel E. Herberte in the Kensington district of London.

In 1936, Phyllis Panting married the fashion designer Henry Digby-Morton. The author H. G. Wells was the best man at their wedding. Their overlapping interests allowed plenty of scope for co-operation and Phyllis helped run Digby's business and compared fashion shows.

== Woman and Beauty ==
Digby-Morton's editorship of Woman and Beauty was noted for breaking new ground in the women's magazine market, not always to the comfort of the board of Fleetway Publications, the owners. Previously dominated by subjects such as needlework and cookery, Digby-Morton introduced "virginity, frigidity, fertility and infidelity". She later recalled, "We tackled all the 'ity' subjects and what a fuss they caused with all those gentlemen on the Fleetway board". Her husband, Henry Digby-Morton, thought that Phyllis really rather liked controversy, saying "Her idea of bliss is to sit between Lord Beaverbrook and Lord Rothermere and argue madly about the woman's point of view." Phyllis Digby-Morton was one of the first people to write a modern advice column, for which she used the pen name Anne Seymour.

== World War Two ==
On 13 September 1940, the SS City of Benares set sail with 209 (including 5 women) crew, 6 convoy staff, 91 paying passengers (including 43 women and 10 children), and 90 children (46 boys, 44 girls, ages 5–15) being evacuated by the Children's Overseas Reception Board (CORB), accompanied by their ten escorts (3 men and 7 women). The Digby-Morton couple was among the 91 paying passengers. On the first night at sea Phyllis sat at the Captain's table in the massive dining room. She asked the captain, Landles Nicoll, why he hadn't brought his daughters with him on the voyage. He replied "I as soon put their hands in the fire." Digby-Morton thought the whole overseas reception scheme was a bad idea.

The Benares sailed in a convoy of 19 ships, protected by three warships, but in the early hours of 17 September 1940 the escorts left to protect a vital incoming convoy (Convoy HX 71). Tragically, the Benares was spotted by a German U-boat, U-48, and torpedoed at 10:03 PM on 17 September. The paying passengers (including women and children) were ordered to stay in the ship's lounge while all the CORB children boarded the lifeboats. By the time they Digby-Mortons got to the boat deck, only one lifeboat still hung over the side of the ship. Phyllis saw that it was just about to touch the water. She found another group of people coming up from below, Margaret Hodgson and her husband Tom, Alice and Patricia (Pat) Bulmer (aged 14), and Pat's school-friend Dorothy (aged 15). Phyllis consulted with the others, and one by one they leapt into the sea and swam for the lifeboat. The group was pulled in, but no sooner were they aboard than a wave slammed into the boat, overturning it. Another lifeboat, Boat 2, was nearby and it pulled in the Digby-Mortons. Phyllis spotted Margaret Hodgson and she pulled the woman into the boat. A few seconds later she pulled in Pat Bulmer, but they soon realized that the others had died. At about 7:30 PM on 18 September 1940 eight people in Lifeboat 2 (out of 38 who originally boarded), including the Digby-Mortons, Margaret Hodgson, and Pat Bulmer, were rescued by HMS Hurricane. Out of 406 people on board, 258 had died and 148 had survived. 81 children of 100 on board lost their lives.

Back in England, Phyllis advised the Ministry of Labour and the Board of Trade regarding the employment of women in the work force while continuing to edit Woman and Beauty.

== Later career ==
Digby Morton was later beauty editor of Woman's Own and consultant editor of that magazine. Away from magazines, Digby Morton worked as a consultant for cosmetics companies and the high street chemists Boots. She was a regular on Woman's Hour.
