= May Baldwin =

British girls' school story author

May Baldwin (8 May 1862 in Lucknow, India – 1950) was a British girls' school story book author.

An international traveller, Baldwin's work was far less nationalistic than that of her contemporaries.

== Early life ==
Born in 1862, in India, where her father - the Rev. John Richard Baldwin - was a chaplain, May Baldwin was one of five children, and was sent to school in Germany. The family returned to England from 1869-1871 and later returned permanently in 1879, when Rev. Baldwin took a living at Dewsbury. May Baldwin trained to be a teacher at Bishop Otter College.

== Career ==
Her works include:

- A Popular Girl: A Tale of School Life in Germany (1901)
- A Plucky Girl; or, The Adventures of 'Miss Nell' (1902)
- Sibyl; or, Old School Friends (1903)
- The Sunset Rock: A Story for Girls (1903)
- That Awful Little Brother (1904)
- The Girls of St. Gabriel's; or, Life at a French School (1905)
- Peg's Adventures in Paris (1906)
- Dora: A High School Girl (1906)
- The Follies of Fifi (1907)
- Mysie: A Highland Lassie (1907)
- Holly House and Ridges Row: A Tale of London Old and New (1908)
- Golden Square High School (1908)
- Barbara Bellamy: A Public School Girl (1909)
- Sarah's School Friend (1910)
- Two Schoolgirls of Florence (1910)
- A Schoolgirl of Moscow (1911)
- The Girls' Eton (1911)
- A City Schoolgirl and Her Friends (1912)
- Corah's School Chums (1912)
- Hilda's Experiences (1913)
- A Schoolgirl's Diary: The Story of Her Holiday Beyond the Seas (1914)
- Phyllis McPhilemy: A School Story (1915)
- Mrs. Manning's Wards (1916)
- Irene to the Rescue: The Story of an English Girl's Fight for the Right (1917)
- Miss Peter (1917)
- Three Pickles in and out of School (1921)
- A Schoolgirl of the Blue (1923)
- The Twins Make Good (1928)
