= Lorna Hill =

English author

- Born: Lorna Leatham; 21 February 1902; Durham, England
- Died: 17 August 1991 (aged 89); Keswick, Cumbria, England
- Occupations: Novelist, teacher
- Writing career
- Period: 1948–1978
- Notable works: Marjorie series, Sadlers Wells series

Lorna Hill (born Lorna Leatham, 21 February 1902 in Durham, England, died 17 August 1991 in Keswick, Cumbria), was an English author of over 40 books for children. These remained popular into the 21st century.

== Life and works ==
Lorna, the daughter of G. H. Leatham and his wife Edit (née Rutter), attended Durham High School for Girls and then Le Manoir, a finishing school in Lausanne, Switzerland. She gained a BA in English literature in 1926, at Durham University, where met her husband, Victor Hill, an Anglican clergyman. They were married in Newcastle-upon-Tyne in 1928 and in 1931 moved to the remote parish of Matfen, Northumberland, where she played the church organ and ran a Sunday school.

Hill's career as an author began when her daughter Vicki (Shirley Victorine), aged about ten, found a story her mother had written as a child and asked for more about its characters. The result was a series of eight books about Marjorie & Co, illustrated by author. These began to be published in London in 1948. They were followed by the Patience series and several others.

When Vicki left home to be a ballet student at Sadler's Wells in London, Hill missed her and began to write her Dream of Sadler's Wells series. She eventually wrote a total of 40 children's books, as well as La Sylphide, a commissioned biography of the dancer Marie Taglioni and two romances for adults, published in 1978. Hill was then obliged to stop writing by ill health. She is said to have been firm with publishers and to have earned more from her books than many of her contemporaries. Translations of some titles into several other languages appeared, including less usual ones such as Finnish (by Pirkko Biström, 1991), Indonesian (1994), Czech (1995) and Slovenian (by Bernarda Petelinšek, 1996).

In private life, Hill took an interest in animal rights that led to conflict with neighbouring farmers. She moved late in life to Keswick, Cumbria, where she lived with Vicki. She died on 17 August 1991.

The reprint list of Girls Gone By Publishers, based in Radstock, Somerset, included four of Lorna Hill's children's books in 2011, although by 2019 they were out of print. The UK publishing journal The Publisher remarked in 1948, "Lorna Hill writes the kind of books children would write for, and about, themselves if they could."

== Bibliography ==
=== Marjorie series ===
1. Marjorie and Co (1948)
2. Stolen Holiday (1948)
3. Border Peel (1950, illustrated by the author's daughter under the name Esmé Verity)
4. Northern Lights (1999, written in 1941 but not previously published)
5. Castle in Northumbria (1953)
6. No Medals for Guy (1962)

=== Sadlers Wells series ===
1. A Dream of Sadlers Wells (1950)
2. Veronica at the Wells (1951)
3. Masquerade at the Wells (1952)
4. No Castanets at the Wells (1953)
5. Jane Leaves the Wells (1953)
6. Ella at the Wells (1954)
7. Return to the Wells (1955)
8. Rosanna Joins the Wells (1956)
9. Principal Rôle (1957)
10. Swan Feather (1958)
11. Dress-Rehearsal (1959)
12. Back-Stage (1960)
13. Vicki in Venice (1962)
14. The Secret (1964)

=== Patience series ===
1. They Called Her Patience (1951)
2. It Was All Through Patience (1952)
3. So Guy Came Too (1954)
4. The Five Shilling Holiday (1955)

=== Dancing Peel series ===
1. Dancing Peel (1954)
2. Dancer's Luck (1955)
3. The Little Dancer (1956)
4. Dancer in the Wings (1958)
5. Dancer in Danger (1960)
6. Dancer on Holiday (1962)

=== The Vicarage Children series ===
1. The Vicarage Children (1961)
2. More About Mandy (1963)
3. The Vicarage Children in Skye (1966)

=== Adult books ===
1. La Sylphide, The Life of Marie Taglioni (1967)
2. The Scent of Rosemary (1978)
3. The Other Miss Perkin (1978)
