= Margaret Biggs =

British writer of girls' school stories (1929–2023)

- Born: Margaret Eve Biggs; 1929; Orpington, Kent
- Died: 2023 (aged 93–94); Solihull, England
- Occupation: Writer
- Spouse: David Cadney
- Children: 3
- Writing career
- Pen name: Eve Gothard
- Genre: School stories
- Notable work: The Melling series

Margaret Eve Biggs (1929–2023) was an English writer of girls' school stories. She was best known for her Melling School series of books, first published by Blackie in the 1950s. The series is set at a weekly boarding school and is unusual in showing boarding school and home life side by side. The interaction between girls and boys is also atypical of the genre at that time. The Melling series was republished by Girls Gone By Publishers in the 2000s and the reprints, whilst retaining the original text and artwork, have new introductions by Biggs, who was "taking great pleasure in the republication of her books".

== Life and career ==
Margaret Eve Biggs was born in Orpington, Kent in 1929. She moved to Hertfordshire in 1935 where she was educated at Queen Elizabeth's School for Girls in Barnet. After leaving school in 1946, Biggs worked in the editorial department of Evans Brothers publishers, where she met Jacqueline Blairman with whom she co-wrote her first school story. Before that, her published writing had consisted of short stories and magazine articles.

She wrote two new volumes in the series 50 years later, Kate at Melling, set 12 years after the earlier books, and Changes at Melling, which were published by Girls Gone By Publishers in 2008 and 2009 respectively.

Biggs married David Cadney in 1953; they one daughter and two sons. The couple moved to Solihull together. She died there in 2023.

== Critical response ==
The Encyclopaedia of Girls' School Stories says that her "world is warm without being too cosy, and realistic without being too harsh". Biggs herself wrote "I felt strongly that girls' traditional school stories needed a bit of a shake-up out of the old mould".

== Works ==
=== The Melling series ===
- The Blakes Come to Melling, Blackie, 1951. ASIN B0000CI0SM
  - Republ. by Girls Gone By Publishers, 2004. ISBN 1-904417-38-8
- The New Prefect at Melling, Blackie, 1952. ASIN B0000CI7ZY
  - Republ. by Girls Gone By Publishers, 2004. ISBN 1-904417-51-5
- Last Term for Helen, Blackie, 1953. ASIN B0000CIKD0
  - Republ. by Girls Gone By Publishers, 2005. ISBN 1-904417-64-7
- The Head Girl at Melling, Blackie, 1954. ASIN B0000CIT5P
  - Republ. by Girls Gone By Publishers, 2005. ISBN 1-904417-77-9
- Susan in the Sixth, Blackie, 1955. ASIN B0000CJ83R
  - Republ. by Girls Gone By Publishers, 2007. ISBN 978-1-84745-022-7
- The New Girl at Melling, Blackie, 1956.
  - Republ. by Girls Gone By Publishers, 2006. ISBN 1-904417-97-3
- Summer term at Melling, Blackie, 1957. ASIN B0000CJRRL
  - Republ. by Girls Gone By Publishers, 2007. ISBN 978-1-84745-012-8
- Stories of Melling School, Blackie, 1960. OCLC 638627763 (Containing: The Blakes come to Melling, The New Prefect at Melling, and, Last Term for Helen)
- More stories of Melling School, Blackie, 1961. ASIN B0000CKXIN (Containing: The Head Girl at Melling, Susan in the Sixth, and, Summer Term at Melling)
- Kate at Melling, Girls Gone By Publishers, 2008. ISBN 978-1-84745-035-7
- Changes at Melling, Girls Gone By Publishers, 2009. ISBN 978-1-84745-077-7

=== Other titles ===
- Triplets at Royders (with Jacqueline Blairman), Sampson Low, 1950?
- Christmas term at Vernley, Blackie, 1951
  - Republ. by Girls Gone By Publishers, 2012. ISBN 978-1-84745-144-6
- Bobby at Hill House, Warne, 1954
  - Republ. by Girls Gone By Publishers, 2014. ISBN 978-1-84745-170-5
- Dilly goes to Ambergate, Blackie, 1955
  - Republ. by Girls Gone By Publishers, 2011. ISBN 978-1-84745-113-2
- The Two Families, Blackie, 1958
  - Republ. by Girls Gone By Publishers, 2010. ISBN 978-1-84745-091-3

=== Short stories ===
- "Mary's New Friend" in A Book of Girls' Stories, Golden Pleasure Books, 1964
- "Lucinda's Long Afternoon" and "Pip and the Famous Author" in Girls' Choice: A New Book of Stories, Hamlyn, 1965

== See also ==
- The Chalet School series of books written by Elinor Brent-Dyer.
- The genre author Angela Brazil
