= Girls Gone By Publishers =

UK publisher

- Founder: Clarissa Cridland and Ann Mackie-Hunter
- Country of origin: United Kingdom
- Headquarters location: Leominster, Herefordshire
- Distribution: International
- Key people: Clarissa Cridland and Ann Mackie-Hunter
- Publication types: Books
- Nonfiction topics: Reprints of 20th century young adult fiction, non-fiction relating to young adult fiction
- Fiction genres: Young adult fiction
- Official website: Girls Gone By website

Girls Gone By Publishers is a publishing company run by Clarissa Cridland and Ann Mackie-Hunter and is based in Leominster, Herefordshire. They re-publish new editions of some of the most popular girls' fiction titles from the twentieth century.

== Elinor Brent-Dyer ==
Re-published titles by Elinor Brent-Dyer include:

- Two Sams at the Chalet School (2008)
- Trouble at Skelton Hall (2009)
- Three Go to the Chalet School (2007)
- Ruey Richardson - Chaletian (2009)
- The New House at the Chalet School (2008)
- The New Chalet School (2009)
- A Head Girl's Difficulties (2008)
- A Genius at the Chalet School (2007)
- The Feud in the Chalet School (2009)
- Excitements at the Chalet School (2007)
- The Coming of Age of the Chalet School (2008)
- The Chalet School in Exile (2009)
- The Chalet School Christmas Story Book (2007)
- The Chalet Girls' Cookbook (2009)
- Carola Storms the Chalet School (2008)
- Adrienne and the Chalet School (2009)

Girls Gone By Publishers own the copyright of all works, unpublished and published by Elinor Brent Dyer.

== Margaret Biggs ==
Re-published titles by Margaret Biggs include:

- The Blakes Come to Melling
- The New Prefect at Melling
- Last Term for Helen
- Head Girl of Melling (2005)
- The New Girl at Melling (2006)
- Summer Term at Melling (2007)
- Susan in the Sixth (2007)
- Kate at Melling (2008)
- Changes at Melling (2009)

== Angela Brazil ==
Re-published titles by Angela Brazil include:

- A Fourth Form Friendship (2006)

== Dorita Fairlie Bruce ==
The following list of republished titles written by Dorita Fairlie Bruce is based on a search on the Jisc Library Hub Discover database. (Note: The Jisc Library Hub Discover brings together the catalogues of 165 major UK and Irish libraries. Additional libraries are being added all the time, and the catalogue collates national, university, and research libraries.) All of the republished works are paperbacks.

- The best bat in the school and other stories (2004) ISBN 978-1-904417-48-4
- Nancy returns to St. Bride's (2005) ISBN 978-1-904417-70-5
- The school on the moor (2006) ISBN 978-1-84745-006-7
- The school in the woods (2007) ISBN 978-1-847450-19-7
- Toby at Tibbs Cross (2008) ISBN 978-1-84745-050-0
- The serendipity shop (2009) ISBN 978-1-84745-062-3
- Triffeny (2010) ISBN 978-1-84745-094-4
- The debatable mound (2011) ISBN 978-1-84745-114-9
- Dimsie and the Jane Willard Foundation (2011) ISBN 978-1-84745-106-4
- The bartle bequest (2012) ISBN 978-1-84745-142-2
- Wild goose quest (2013) ISBN 978-1-84745-165-1

== Monica Edwards ==
Re-published titles by Monica Edwards include:

- Hidden in a Dream (2006)
- Storm Ahead (2005)
- No Entry (2005)
- The Nightbird (2006)
- Operation Seabird (2007)
- Strangers to the Marsh (2007)
- No Going Back (2008)
- The Hoodwinkers (2008)
- Dolphin Summer (2009)
- A Wind Is Blowing (2009)
- The Wild One (2010)

(Girls Gone By Publishers are planning to re-publish the entire output of Monica Edwards).

== Josephine Elder ==
Re-published titles by Josephine Elder include:

- Evelyn Finds Herself (2006)

== Antonia Forest ==
Re-published titles by Antonia Forest include:

- Celebrating Antonia Forest (2008)
- The Thursday Kidnapping (2009)

== Lorna Hill ==
Re-published titles by Lorna Hill include:

- Border Peel (2007)
- The Vicarage Children (2008)
- Northern Lights (2009)
- More About Mandy (2009)

== Clare Mallory ==
Re-published titles by Clare Mallory include

- The New House at Winwood (2008)
- The League of the Smallest (2009)

== Violet Needham ==
Re-published titles by Violet Needham include:

- The House of the Paladin (2006)
- Pandora of Parrham Royal (2009)
- The Red Rose of Ruvina (2009)
- The Secret of the White Peacock (2008)

== Elsie Jeanette Oxenham ==
Re-published titles by Elsie Jeanette Oxenham include:

- Goblin Island (2007)
- Jen of the Abbey School (2007)
- Maidlin Bears the Torch (2009)
- The New Abbey Girls (2008)

== Malcolm Saville ==
Re-published titles by Malcolm Saville include:

- The Elusive Grasshopper (2008)
- The Gay Dolphin Adventure (2007)
- Lone Pine Five (2008)
- The Neglected Mountain (2009)
- Saucers Over the Moor (2009)
- The Secret of Grey Walls (2007)

== Geoffrey Trease ==
Re-published titles by Geoffrey Trease include:

- A Whiff of Burnt Boats (2009)

== Non fiction ==
Girls Gone By Publishers also publish non-fiction titles based on the work of their re-published authors, such as Antonia Forest, Elsie Jeanette Oxenham, Monica Edwards and Geoffrey Trease.
