= Rose Hinchey =

New Zealand civilian and military nurse (1910–1981

- Born: 21 June 1910; Bluff, New Zealand
- Died: 4 August 1981 (aged 71); Wellington, New Zealand
- Military career
- Allegiance: United Kingdom
- Branch: British Army
- Service years: 1937–1965
- Rank: Major
- Units: Queen Alexandra's Imperial Military Nursing Service (1937–1949); Queen Alexandra's Royal Army Nursing Corps (1949–1965)
- Conflicts: Second World War; Korean War
- Awards: Royal Red Cross; United Nations Service Medal for Korea

Rose Moore Hinchey, RRC (21 June 1910 – 4 August 1981) was a New Zealand civilian and military nurse.

== Early life and education ==
Hinchey was born in Bluff, New Zealand, on 21 June 1910. She was the eldest of four children of William Hinchey and Henrietta Goetze (née Thompson). Her parents ran the Eagle Hotel and her father was also the mayor of Bluff. Hinchey attended Bluff School and Southland Girls' High School. She then trained as a nurse at Kew Hospital in Invercargill, followed by midwifery training at Alexandra Hospital in Wellington.

== Nursing career ==
On completing her training, Hinchey nursed at a hospital in Bowen Street in Wellington. In 1936, she travelled to England and worked at an obstetric hospital alongside fellow Southland expatriate Charles Read.

She was commissioned into the nursing branch of the British Army, Queen Alexandra's Imperial Military Nursing Service, in 1937 and initially nursed at the Cambridge Aldershot Military Hospital for two years. In January 1939, she was posted to a military hospital in Bombay (present-day Mumbai), India. During the Second World War, she served in a number of war zones, and after the war she served in India, the Middle East, Africa, Korea and Malaysia. She attained the rank of major in 1949, which she held until her retirement in 1965.

== Later life ==
She resettled in Wellington, New Zealand, and died there on 4 August 1981. Hinchey's medals are displayed in the entrance hall of Southland Girls' High School, and include the Royal Red Cross and the United Nations Service Medal for Korea.
