= Josephine Elder =

British writer

Josephine Elder was the pen name of Olive Gwendoline Potter (5 December 1895 – 24 July 1988), an English writer of children's literature who published ten school stories between 1924 and 1940 as well as numerous short stories for annuals. She is widely regarded as one of the best writers of the girls' school story. Her most acclaimed book is the 1929 title, Evelyn Finds Herself. Twenty years later Clare Mallory, another leading exponent of the girls' school story, dedicated one of her own books, Juliet Overseas to Josephine Elder, describing her as "Author of the best girls' school story I know: Evelyn Finds Herself."

In addition to her children's books Josephine Elder also wrote six novels for adults. Throughout her writing career she continued to practise as a doctor.

== Biography ==
Born in Croydon, Elder was educated at Croydon High School and later at Girton College, Cambridge University where she studied Natural Sciences. She practised as a G.P. in Sutton, Surrey from 1923 to 1983.

== Bibliography ==
=== School stories ===
- Erica Wins Through (Chambers, 1924)
- The Scholarship Girl (Chambers, 1925)
- The Scholarship Girl at Cambridge (Chambers, 1926)
- Thomasina Toddy (Chambers, 1927)
- Evelyn Finds Herself (OUP, 1929)
- Barbara at School (Blackie, 1930)
- The Redheads (OUP, 1931)

=== Farm school series ===
- Exile for Annis (Collins, 1938)
- Cherry Tree Perch (Collins, 1939)
- Strangers at the Farm School (Collins, 1940)

=== As editor ===
- School Stories for Girls (Hutchinson, 1935)

=== Adult novels ===
as Margaret Potter

- Sister Anne Resigns (Selwyn & Blount, 1931)
- The Mystery of the Purple Bentley (Selwyn & Blount, 1932)

as Josephine Elder

- Lady of Letters (Lutterworth, 1949)
- The Encircled Heart (Lutterworth, 1951)
- The Doctor's Children (Lutterworth, 1954)
- Fantastic Honeymoon (Robert Hale, 1961)

=== Recent reprints ===
- Evelyn Finds Herself (Girls Gone By Publishers, 2006)
- Lady of Letters (Greyladies, 2008)
- The Encircled Heart (Greyladies, 2009)
- Erica Wins Through (Girls Gone By Publishers, 2010)
