= Mabel Esther Allan =

British author

- Born: 11 February 1915; Wallasey, Wirral, England
- Died: 14 May 1998 (aged 83)
- Occupation: Writer
- Writing career
- Pen name: Jean Estoril, Priscilla Hagon, Anne Pilgrim
- Genres: Children's novels: school stories, ballet stories
- Notable works: Dundonay House series, Wood Street series, Pine Street series, Crumble Lane series, Drina series

Mabel Esther Allan (11 February 1915 – 14 May 1998) was a British author of about 170 children's books.

== Biography ==
Mabel Esther Allan was born at Wallasey on the Wirral Peninsula in Cheshire (now Merseyside). She decided to be an author at the age of eight; her father bought her a writing desk and taught her how to type. When the family moved, Allan was given a study in which to write.

Her eyesight was poor, which her parents 'took...very badly and wrongly'. It was such a taboo subject that she never discussed it with anyone until she was almost thirty, when it spontaneously improved. Her eyesight was the reason she disliked school.

She published a few short stories in the 1930s, and had longer submissions accepted, but her activities were interrupted by the Second World War. Allan served in the Women's Land Army and taught at a crowded school in Liverpool. In 1945 she sent the manuscript of The Glen Castle Mystery to her publisher, and this first book was published in 1948. Like L.M. Montgomery's characters, she began writing her books with a 'Flash': a sense of possessing a landscape for a story. 'It was the basis of all my writing', she commented in a 2006 foreword to Chiltern Adventure.

== Work ==
Although Allan, like many authors of the era, often used the school-book genre, she was a proponent of A.S. Neill, founder of an educational philosophy which promoted freedom and self-discipline in childhood. Most of her fictional schools, significantly, were co-educational.

Her books include adventure stories, mysteries, stories about families and local communities, school stories and ballet stories. She wrote for various ages and her books did not follow a "settled pattern." Her ballet stories include the Drina series and the Ballet Family series written under the pen-name Jean Estoril. She also wrote under the pen-names Priscilla Hagon and Anne Pilgrim. Most of her books were standalones but she did pen a few series, such as two series about groups of modern city children: the Wood Street Gang from Liverpool and the boys and girls of Almond House flats who attend Pine Street School.

== Selected books ==
=== Dundonay House Series ===
- Over the Sea to School (1950)
- A School in Danger (1950)
- At School in Skye (1957)

=== Wood Street Series ===
- The Wood Street Secret (1968)
- The Wood Street Group (1970)
- The Wood Street Rivals (1971)
- The Wood Street Helpers (1973)
- Away from Wood Street (1976)
- Wood Street and Mary Ellen (1979)
- Strangers in Wood Street (1980)
- Growing Up in Wood Street (1982)

=== Pine Street Series ===
- Crow's Nest (1974)
- Pine Street Pageant (1978)
- Pine Street Goes Camping (1980)
- Pine Street Problem (1981)
- Goodbye to Pine Street (1982)
- Alone at Pine Street (1982)
- Friends at Pine Street (1984)
- Pride of Pine Street (1984)
- First Term at Ashgrove (1988)

=== Crumble Lane Series ===
- The Crumble Lane Adventure (1983)
- Trouble in Crumble Lane (1984)
- The Crumble Lane Captives (1986)
- The Crumble Lane Mystery (1987)

=== Drina Series – as Jean Estoril ===
The Drina Books are a series of novels about a young girl who wishes to be a ballerina. Drina lost both her parents at a very young age and lives with her grandparents. Her mother was a prima ballerina, but Drina's grandmother blames ballet for the death of her daughter and hence dissuades Drina from dancing. However, in the second book Drina gets her wish and goes to the fictional Dominick Ballet School at Red Lion Square, London.

- Ballet for Drina (1957) – Drina meets her lifelong friend Jenny Pilgrim, who introduces her to the world of ballet lessons. For an unknown reason, Drina's grandmother forbids her to learn ballet, but Drina perseveres until her grandmother gives in. We meet many characters who recur throughout the series, including Jenny Pilgrim, Drina's best friend, and Daphne Daniety, a rival dance student. After learning dancing with Janetta Selswick in Willerbury, Drina then moves with her grandparents to London but is denied further dancing lessons. Drina decides she must dance, even without her grandparents' blessing and learns behind their backs, until events collide and her grandmother is forced to see that some things cannot be stopped. Drina is granted an audition for the Dominick Ballet School, then finds out days before her audition that her mother was the great ballerina, Elizabeth Ivory. Drina decides that she does not want anyone to know of her famous ancestry so that she can succeed on her own.
- Drina's Dancing Year (1958) – Drina successfully auditions for the Dominick School. We meet Rose Conway, who becomes Drina's best friend in London. Daphne Daniety is accepted to the school at the same time as Drina, along with another longtime rival-to-be, Queenie Rothington. At the end of the year, Drina gets a dancing/acting role in a West End play.
- Drina Dances in Exile (1959) (Published as Drina Dances Alone in the USA) – Drina leaves the Dominick School because her grandparents go abroad for her grandfather's health. Initially unhappy at being forced into 'exile' in the countryside at the Dominick's boarding school, Chalk Green, she becomes happier when her good friend Rose receives a scholarship to attend there as well. Christine Gifford, the nastiest of Drina's rivals, makes her first appearance. The film of The Breton Wedding – her mother's most famous ballet – is revived, and Drina and Rose see it in London. The experience of seeing her mother is so strange that Drina ends up confessing to Rose that her mother was Elizabeth Ivory.
- Drina Dances in Italy (1959) (Published as Drina Dances on Stage in the USA) – We are introduced to Ilonka and the Lorencz family, who are refugees that have escaped from behind the Iron Curtain. Igor Dominick Jr. moves from Paris to live with his father. He causes a stir at the Dominick School. Drina goes to Italy to meet her father's family and ends up dancing with the Dominick there, along with her friend Emilia from Chalk Green and Igor Jr.
- Drina Dances Again (1960) – A sprained ankle at the start of term forces Drina to stop dancing for a month. This gives her the opportunity to play the role of Margaret in Dear Brutus (J. M. Barrie) for a short run in the West End. That summer Drina and Rose are chosen to dance in The Nutcracker as 'Little Clara' with the Dominick Company at the Edinburgh Festival. Igor Dominick Snr. and Marianne Volanaise discover that Drina is Ivory's daughter, but agree to continue keeping it a secret. Daphne Daniety, Drina's longtime rival from Willerbury days, leaves the Dominick School when her progress is deemed insufficient.
- Drina Dances in New York (1961) – Drina's grandparents take her on a trip to New York, travelling on a cruise ship where they meet the Rossiters and their son Grant, who features throughout the rest of the series. On the ship, she meets a dancer suffering from stage fright and choreographs her first short ballet.
- Drina Dances in Paris (1962) – Some members of the Dominick School act, dance and sing in the play The Land Before Christmas. Drina's ballet she made in New York is danced at the Dominick Matinee. Christine Gifford is expelled from the Dominick School after being caught bullying some of the Juniors and Drina. Drina and Rose are asked to go to Paris to dance in The Nutcracker once again after the dancer playing 'Little Clara' is injured. Grant shows up in Paris.
- Drina Dances in Madeira (1963) – Rose returns to the Dominick School, joined by others from Chalk Green who have also come. Drina acts in the play Diary of a Dancer based on the story of the Lorencz family. Drina's grandfather becomes seriously ill in hospital, and the Chesters go on holiday to Madeira where Drina dances with the Lingeraux Company at a festival in Funchal. At the end of the book, Mrs Chester tells Drina that they are moving to the Italian part of Switzerland for the winter and that Drina will be going with them.
- Drina Dances in Switzerland (1964) – Drina is sent to a stuffy finishing school in Switzerland where she cannot dance.
- Drina Goes on Tour (1965) – Drina returns to the Dominick, where the secret of her ancestry is revealed and all the media want to meet her. She becomes a Senior Student and goes on tour with the Dominick. Jenny Pilgrim marries a young farmer. At the end of the book Grant turns up in London.
- Drina Ballerina (1991) – The story begins with Drina visiting Jenny at her farm. Jenny has just given birth to a daughter, Mary Andrina. Jenny and Drina talk about their lives and some of the distance that had crept between them is erased. Drina dances for Jenny in the apple orchard, and Jenny remembers her predictions about Drina's future when they were children. Drina returns to London and meets up with Grant. While the two are cooking dinner in Drina's grandparents' flat, Drina finally tells Grant that she will marry him. She had been putting him off for months, hoping to "get" somewhere in the Dominick company before they married. The set the wedding date for a few months in the future, in April.

Drina's announcement of her engagement baffles Igor Jr. who fancies himself in love with her. He then turns to Rose, which angers her because she knows he is only with her because Drina won't have him. Rose takes some of this hurt out on Drina. The problems between the two are further exacerbated when the Dominick company decides to put on the ballet Drina made in Switzerland (Drina Dances in Switzerland) with Drina in the lead role. The secret of Drina's mother was revealed to the world in the previous book and so the information that Ivory's daughter is dancing in a ballet she created causes a sensation. Drina's ballet is successful and she has found her dancing partner, Igor. Despite the fact there is nothing but friendship between them off-stage, on-stage they have powerful chemistry. Mr. Dominick and Madame Volonaise express some regret that the two did not mesh off stage, but both like Grant anyway.

Drina's dancing career is off to a good start and will soon receive a boost. The film of her mother's last ballet The Breton Wedding is shown on TV. This showing and Drina's dancing ability (very like her mother's) encourages Mr. Dominick to revive the ballet. Drina is to dance the lead role of Josette while Igor will be the doomed lover. The ballet is met with critical and commercial success. After the initial run of the ballet, Drina marries Grant in a small ceremony. They will move into a flat that is a few houses down from her grandparents after their honeymoon in New York. The book ends with Drina and Grant flying to New York as newlyweds. Drina has realised her dream to be a ballerina and has married the man she fell in love with when she was fourteen (Drina Dances in New York).

=== The Ballet Family ===
- The Ballet Family (1963)
- The Ballet Family Again (1964)

=== Single Title ===
- We Danced in Bloomsbury Square (1967) (Also published as The Ballet Twins)
