= Southland Girls' High School =

Location
- 328 Tweed Street, Invercargill, New Zealand; 46.4173°S 168.3659°E

Information
- Type: State with boarding facilities at Enwood House
- Motto: Non Scholae Sed Vitae Discimus; Not for school but for life we are learning
- Established: 1879; 147 years ago
- Ministry of Education Institution no.: 405
- Principal: John Grogan
- Years offered: 7 – 13
- Gender: Girls
- Enrolment: 1,089 (July 2026)
- Socio-economic decile: 5M
- Website: southlandgirls.school.nz

Southland Girls' High School is a state girls' Year 7–13 secondary school in Georgetown, Invercargill, New Zealand.

The school was established in 1879. It is a single-sex state school for years 7 to 13 with a roll of 1,089 students as of July 2026. From the 1880s to 1907 it shared a site with Southland Boys' High School and senior girls attended some classes at the boys' school. It moved to the current site in 1947.

It consists of two main school blocks, one the former Tweedsmuir Junior High School. Students of all ages are mixed around the classrooms to involve all students thoroughly in school life, and one uniform is worn by all year levels. The students also wear red shoes with their uniforms. Two-yearly musical dramas are produced in conjunction with Southland Boys' High School.

The 2006 NZQA report commended the school and staff for the very good practices and consistently high standards.

A new school gymnasium was officially opened in 2007 by Sport and Recreation Minister Trevor Mallard.

Enwood House is the Southland Girls' High School hostel for boarders between years 7 and 13. Enwood House provides 24 hour care for boarders with night staff on duty at all times. Girls can stay Monday to Friday or full-time, and short term stays are available.

== Principals ==
Since its establishment in 1879, Southland Girls' High School has had 20 principals, with early head teachers being known as lady principals. Until 1905, the school was under the control of the rector of Southland Boys' High School. The following is an incomplete list of school principals:

	Name	Term	Notes
1	E. M. Hood	1879–1880	
2		–	
3		–	
4		–	
5		–	
6		–	
7	Elizabeth Stevenson	1901–1905	
8	Christina Cruickshank	1906–1910	
9	Nancy Jobson	1911–1918	
10	Mary King	1919–1921	
11	Anna Drennan	1922–1923	
12	Elsie Johnston	1924–1925	
13	Margaret Samuel	1926–1931	
14	Ada Eastwood	1932–1940	
15	Muriel May	1941–1956	
16	Pauline Robinson	1956–1961	
17	Eliza Cora Reid Wilson	1961–1966	
18	Elizabeth Clarkson	1966–1985	
19	Linda Braun	1986–2002	
20	Yvonne Browning	2003–2026	
21	John Grogan	2026-present	

== Notable alumnae ==
- Genevieve Behrent (born 1990), rower
- Ann Chapman (1935–2009), limnologist and first woman to lead an Antarctic expedition
- Jean Herbison (1923–2007), academic and educator
- Rose Hinchey (1910–1981), military nurse
- Molly Macalister (1920–1979), artist
- Clare Mallory (1913–1991), children's writer
- Lucy McIntyre (born 1997), New Zealand softball player
- Alena Saili (born 1998), rugby sevens player
- Amy du Plessis (born 1999), New Zealand rugby player
