= Antonia Forest =

English children's writer (1915–2003)

- Born: Patricia Giulia Caulfield Kate Rubinstein; 26 May 1915; London, England
- Died: 29 November 2003 (aged 88); Bournemouth, Bournemouth Unitary Authority, Dorset, England
- Resting place: Wimborne Road Cemetery
- Education: University College, London
- Occupation: Novelist
- Writing career
- Pen name: Antonia Forest
- Notable work: Marlow series

Antonia Forest (26 May 1915 – 28 November 2003) was the pseudonym of Patricia Giulia Caulfield Kate Rubinstein, an English writer. She wrote 13 books for children, published between 1948 and 1982. Her ten best-known works concern the doings of the fictional Marlow family. Several are school stories. Forest also wrote two historical novels about the Marlows' Elizabethan ancestors.

== Life ==
Forest was born to part Russian-Jewish and Irish parents on 26 May 1915. She was an only child. She grew up in Hampstead, London, and was educated at South Hampstead High School and University College, London, where she studied journalism. During World War II, she worked at an Army Pay Office.

From 1938 until her death in 2003, Forest lived in Bournemouth.

Although she was brought up Reform Jewish, her views became increasingly influenced by Christianity. In 1946, she converted to Roman Catholicism.

Forest corresponded with her readers and with literary figures such as GB Stern. She never married, and supported herself by renting out part of her house in Bournemouth.

== Marlow series ==
Forest is known for the Marlow series of novels featuring one contemporary generation of the Marlows, an ancient, landed family whose patriarch is a Royal Navy commander (later captain). Among eight children, all six daughters go to Kingscote, a boarding school where the four books named after school "Terms" are set.

The Marlows' world is richly described, with the school stories featuring the protagonists' wide-ranging interests and the strengths and weaknesses of members of their circle. The Attic Term uses the teenage character Patrick Merrick to express Forest's opposition to changes in Roman Catholicism after the Second Vatican Council.

Forest also wrote The Player's Boy (1970) and The Players and the Rebels (1971), about the Marlows' ancestors in Shakespeare's time. These were intended as one book, but printed as two because of the length.

Marlow books featuring the contemporary family
Title	Date	Setting	Twins' Form ‡
Autumn Term	1948	Autumn term	Third Form
The Marlows and the Traitor	1953	Easter holidays	Third Form
Falconer's Lure	1957	Summer holidays	Third Form
End of Term	1959	Autumn term	Lower Fourth
Peter's Room	1961	Christmas holidays	Lower Fourth
The Thuggery Affair	1965	Spring half-term	Lower Fourth
The Ready-Made Family	1967	Easter holidays	Lower Fourth
The Cricket Term	1974	Summer term	Lower Fourth
The Attic Term	1976	Autumn term	Upper Fourth
Run Away Home	1982	Christmas holidays	Upper Fourth

‡ "Twins' Form" refers to the school stages of twins Nicola and Lawrie.

The Marlow books have been noted for their 'floating timeline'; the same characters who experienced the London Blitz as children go on to watch Up Pompeii! and make themselves up as punks only a few years later.

Although Forest indicated that she was working on a successor to Run Away Home, no manuscript was found among her papers after her death in 2003. In 2011, Girls Gone By published the book Spring Term by Sally Hayward as a continuation of the Marlow series.

== Reception ==
The Thursday Kidnapping (1963) was Forest's only book not about the Marlows, and the only one published in the U.S. It was a commended runner-up for the Library Association's Carnegie Medal, for the year's best children's book by a British subject. Two Marlow books were also commended runners-up for the medal: Falconer's Lure and Peter's Room, for 1957 and 1961 respectively. (Note: Today there are usually eight books on the Carnegie shortlist. According to CCSU, there were about 160 commendations of two kinds in 49 years from 1954 to 2002, including six for 1957, four 1961, and five 1963.)

Forest's books have received critical praise from Victor Watson, who called her "the Jane Austen of children's literature", and from Alison Shell, who has studied Forest's theme of recusant Catholicism.

The Marlow books also featured in Lucy Mangan's 2012 memoir of favourite childhood reading. Mangan chose the first Marlow book as one of her top picks for a children's library, saying of the series: 'they are dense and complex books, but among the most fulfilling reads I think a child can have. When I first came across C.S. Lewis's adage, "I read to know that I am not alone", it was the Marlows I thought of'.

Emma Donoghue has called the books "an extraordinarily subtle portrait of an eight-child English family, full of complex moments of resentment and alliance".

== Reissues ==
All of Forest's books, initially published by Faber, went out of print for several decades. This situation was condemned as "outrageous" by The Cambridge Guide to Children's Books in English (2001), which mentions Forest first in its section on neglected works, citing her as "one of the best children's writers of the 20th century" and noting that her work is marked by "extraordinary richness and complexity of characterisation, sensitive treatment of difficult situations, and a deep love of history and literature".

Years after Forest's books went out of print, they gradually became available again, starting with a Faber reprint of Autumn Term in 2000. It was followed by Girls Gone By Publishers' reprints of Falconer's Lure, Run Away Home, The Marlows and the Traitor, The Ready-Made Family, Peter's Room, and The Thuggery Affair. Girls Gone By reprinted The Player's Boy in 2006, The Players and the Rebels in 2008, and The Thursday Kidnapping in 2009. Girls Gone By also published new editions of End of Term (2017) and The Cricket Term (2020). They also reprinted The Marlows and the Traitor (2015), Falconer's Lure (2016), Peter's Room (2018), and The Thuggery Affair (2019).

The Marlows and Their Maker: A Companion to the Series by Antonia Forest was published in 2007.

== See also ==
- School story
- Boarding schools in fiction
