= Falconer's Lure =

1957 novel by Antonia Forest

- First edition cover
- Author: Antonia Forest
- Language: English
- Genre: Novel
- Publisher: Faber and Faber
- Publication date: December 1957
- Publication place: United Kingdom
- Media type: Print (hardback & paperback)
- Pages: 247 p. (hardback edition)
- ISBN: 0-571-06548-1 (hardback edition)
- Preceded by: The Marlows and the Traitor
- Followed by: End of Term

Falconer's Lure is a 1957 falconry-based novel by Antonia Forest. Falconer's Lure is the third book in the series, between The Marlows and the Traitor and End of Term.

In the 1950s pony books were very popular among young girls. Antonia Forest's publishers wanted something different, so she wrote about falconry. Falconer's Lure features the Marlow family during the summer holidays at their cousin's farm, Trennels, and was published in 1957 (although set in 1948). It was republished by Girls Gone by Press in 2002.

== Plot introduction ==
Falconer's Lure introduces Patrick Merrick, a key character in most of the ensuing Marlow books. Living on the neighbouring estate he was a childhood friend of Peter Marlow before WWII. He has spent the last two years at home, recovering from serious injuries sustained by falling off a cliff in search of baby falcons. The dangers of falconry, as well as its thrills, its demands and its sorrows are made very evident. The reader, like Nicola Marlow, is entranced by the falcons and Patrick's evident expertise.

== Plot summary ==
The Marlow family are staying at their cousin Jon's farm during the school holidays. Out collecting eggs early one morning, Nicola Marlow hears what she thinks is a cat caught in the top of a tree. She climbs up to rescue it, only to find that it is a bird, wearing leather thongs. Before she can make any attempt to save it, its owner climbs up beside her. He tells her that the bird is a falcon called Jael and its thongs, or jesses, have broken loose. Nicola recognises him as Patrick Merrick and tells him who she is. He asks if she would like to help with the hawks over the summer.

While they are out with the hawks that afternoon, Patrick and Nicola feel something a bit like an earthquake. When they get back, they find out that it was her cousin Jon's plane crashing and he is dead. Nicola's father inherits the farm and the family will not be returning to London. Neither Captain Marlow, nor his eldest son Giles, want to leave the Navy to run the farm. Nicola suggests by accident that her sister Rowan should do it. She offers and eventually her parents agree that she can leave school to become a farmer.

Nicola and Patrick spend most of their time with the hawks over the summer. While they are teaching Jael to catch rabbits, Peter who is out shooting rabbits, shoots Jael and kills her. Later, Regina rakes away and, although Patrick later finds her caught in some netting, she has forgotten him so he lets her go. Only Sprog, the little merlin who Patrick thinks of as a joke, is left.

The other major event of the summer is the Colebridge Festival. Nicola comes second in the singing competition, despite stopping in the middle of her song because it reminds her of Jael. Her twin Lawrie is sent out of the elocution competition for unconsciously mimicking another contestant. Later, however, she follows the adjudicator and persuades her to let her say her piece again. She agrees that Lawrie has real talent and introduces her to another actor.

Peter and Patrick compete against each other in the diving competition which, in the end, Peter wins and the two of them become friends again. For Nicola, the gymkhana is a crucial competition in which she might win enough money to enable her to keep Sprog at school. Unfortunately, the other contestants think she is Lawrie and want to get their own back at her over her antics in the elocution contest. She is knocked and bumped and falls off her horse. Later, Rowan offers her half of whatever she wins in the showjumping, but she is beaten by Patrick.

When Nicola arrives home with Patrick she is greeted by his father who has a large cheque for her from the sale of a battered sixteenth century book on hawking she bought earlier that summer at Colebridge market. Amazed, Nicola admits to Patrick that she had been worried about the money for Sprog.

== Characters ==
- Nicola Marlow – main character
- Patrick Merrick – owner of the bird "Jael"
- Peter Marlow – Nicola's older brother
- Giles Marlow – Nicola's eldest brother
- Lawrie Marlow - Nicola's identical twin sister
- Rowan Marlow - one of Nicola's older sisters

== Main themes ==
Falconer's Lure mainly deals with the issue of bereavement.
