= The Marlows and the Traitor =

1953 novel by Antonia Forest

- First edition cover
- Author: Antonia Forest
- Language: English
- Publisher: Faber and Faber
- Publication date: 1953
- Publication place: United Kingdom
- Media type: Print (hardback & paperback)
- Pages: 253 pp (recent hardback edition)
- Preceded by: Autumn Term
- Followed by: Falconer's Lure

The Marlows and the Traitor is the second in the series of novels about the Marlow family by Antonia Forest, first published in 1953. The story is set during the Easter holidays in a small fishing village on the South Coast of England. It is the first in the series to feature sailing (see also Falconer's Lure and especially Run Away Home) and the first to have a major male character. In fact there are two significant male characters, Peter Marlow and the traitor. This story, more than most in the series, focuses on the younger members of the family.

In the introduction to the Girls Gone By edition of The Marlows and the Traitor, Forest admits she never intended to write a series of books about the Marlows. At the time of writing (the book was published in 1953), the Nuremberg Trials were happening, and Forest decided to write a book about a traitor. Only then did it occur to her to use the Marlows in the book.

== Plot summary ==
Taking an early morning walk in a fierce storm, Peter Marlow is deliberately snubbed by one of his teachers from Dartmouth Naval College, Lewis Foley, who is spending the Easter holidays in the fishing village of St-Anne's-Byfleet. Later, he and his sister Nicola, follow an irresistible sign to a place called Mariners. Mariners turns out to be a deserted house complete with its own crow's nest and a sign to Foley's Folly Light.

Nicola discovers from one of her fishermen friends, Robert Anquetil, that Lewis had grown up in the village and that Mariners belongs to his family. Anquetil warns her not to go near the house again. However, when she returns to the hotel where the Marlows are staying, she finds that Peter has already told the others and that they are planning a trip that afternoon. Reluctantly, Nicola agrees to go along with them.

The children enter the house and go exploring. While Nicola, Peter and Lawrie go down to the cellars, Ginty agrees to keep guard. When she hears a noise, she panics and follows them down the stairs. Peter has found some microfiche which seems to show details of Naval secrets. A man enters the cellars and the girls are afraid, but Peter recognises him as Lewis Foley and starts to tell him about the secrets he has found.

Foley produces a gun and forces the children to come with him on his boat, but Lawrie manages to escape. Nicola puts sugar in the boat's engine so that Foley can't take them further out to sea. Instead he lands at the lighthouse and signals to someone to collect him there. He is ordered to dispose of the children but ignores this command.

Lawrie gets run over on her way back to the hotel and is knocked unconscious. When she recovers she tells Robert Anquetil, who turns out to be a secret agent, what happened. He is ordered not to look for the children, since capturing the traitor and his allies is more important.

Peter and Nicola make a plan to signal from the lighthouse to any passing ships. Nicola and Ginty pretend that Peter has drowned, trying to escape from the lighthouse so that he can hide without Foley coming to look for him. Foley seems genuinely upset about Peter and is kind to the girls. Later that night, they signal SOS, watching the Naval fleet go past without seeing them. However, they persevere and eventually are spotted by Anquetil. Foley comes up the stairs when they are signalling but Ginty throws her lamp at him and he is seriously injured.

The next day, a submarine emerges and men come to collect Foley and the children. Peter has taken Foley's revolver and he shoots the Admiral. But before anything else can happen, the Navy appear and the submarine is destroyed. The children are rescued and Nicola fulfils an ambition on the way home, when she is allowed onto the bridge of the destroyer. Nicola and Peter are a little disappointed that they are forbidden from telling anyone their adventures, but Ginty is glad to forget the whole thing.

== Reception ==
The Marlows and the Traitor is only one of two of Forest's Marlow series to have been translated. Ironically, since the treachery in the English version implicitly involves England's Second World War enemies, it was published in German. It was first published in German as Notsignal vom Leuchtturm in 1970 by Benziger, Zurich, and later as Die Marlows und der Verräter in 1974 by Ravensburger. In contrast to the original English version, the submarine is stranded in the fog and the fleeing crew is captured by the navy. It remains unclear who the foreign agents are.

=== Translations ===
- de Notsignal vom Leuchtturm. Zurich, 1970: Benziger, translated by Inge M. Artl
- de Die Marlows und der Verräter. Ravensburg, 1974: Ravensburger, translated by Inge M. Artl
- nl Spionage voor de kust. Utrecht, 1959: Spectrum, translated by Evelien van Amstel
