= The Ready-Made Family =

Book by Antonia Forest

- First edition
- Author: Antonia Forest
- Language: English
- Series: The Marlow Family
- Publisher: Faber and Faber
- Publication date: 1967
- Publication place: United Kingdom
- Media type: Print (hardback & paperback)
- ISBN: 0571085474 (hardback edition)
- Preceded by: The Thuggery Affair
- Followed by: The Cricket Term

The Ready-Made Family is the seventh in the series of children's novels about the Marlow family by Antonia Forest, first published in 1967, and set in that period. Although most famous for her school stories, it is the third in a row in the series to be set away from the world of Kingscote College.

== Plot ==
The action begins at Easter at the Marlow family estate, Trennels. Nicola, Lawrie, Ginty and Ann arrive home to be joined almost immediately by their eldest sister Karen. Karen announces that she is giving up her history degree at Oxford (funded by a much-lauded scholarship) to marry Edwin Dodd, a widower and father to three children: Rose (ten), Chas (nine) and Phoebe ('Fob', five). Karen marries Edwin and they move in with the Marlows whilst Edwin searches for a house near his new job as county archivist at Streweminster. Rose becomes attached to Mrs Marlow and, distraught at the prospect of moving, runs away to her former home in Oxford. Nicola learns of this and follows her, to discover Rose in the company of a sinister figure called Uncle Gerry, who claims Rose's mother is still alive. Rose, naive and grief-stricken, believes this until she sees a "for sale" sign on the family's former house. She and Nicola escape, running into Edwin, who has been alerted by a telegram from Nicola.

== Themes ==
Antonia Forest originally intended to be a writer of adult novels, and her children's books reflect a range of serious concerns. Here they reach an apogee, as Rose's grief at the loss of her mother leaves her vulnerable to grooming by a paedophile. The plot reaches an emotional climax as Nicola uses her schoolgirl Latin to describe to Edwin what has happened; Rose herself remains ignorant of the peril she has narrowly escaped. Elsewhere, Jane Austen, Shakespeare and railways are motifs and a strong impression of Oxford is conveyed as Nicola searches and explores the city.

== Plot implications ==
The fact that Karen's scholarship ('The Prosser') is now free for Kingscote College to re-award becomes a plot strand in the next Marlow book, The Cricket Term. Although it is a school-set story, the Dodd children re-appear (with Karen) at the beginning and at school speech day at the end.
