= Peter's Room =

Book by Antonia Forest

- First edition
- Author: Antonia Forest
- Language: English
- Publisher: Faber and Faber
- Publication date: 1961
- Publication place: United Kingdom
- Media type: Print (hardback & paperback)
- Pages: 231 pp (paperback edition)
- ISBN: 0-571-11268-4 (paperback edition)
- Preceded by: End of Term
- Followed by: The Thuggery Affair

Peter's Room is a book by British children's author Antonia Forest, published in 1961. It is the fifth instalment of the modern Marlow series, between End of Term and The Thuggery Affair. Unlike the school stories for which Forest is best known, Peter's Room is set entirely at (or near) the family's home.

== Plot introduction ==
The Marlow family, less their father and Giles, who are away at sea, spend their first Christmas at Trennels, the country estate they inherited following the death of their cousin Jon in an aeroplane accident. Eldest sister Kay is down from Oxford and spends most of her time closeted in the house's library and Rowan is preoccupied with her new role as farm manager. The main action of the book takes place in 'Peter's Room' - the loft of a disused outbuilding which Peter Marlow has been exploring, uncovering a variety of artefacts, such as a series of ancient farm record books. Snowed in at Trennels and spurred initially by Ginty's school project on the Brontë sisters' fantasy writings, they invent a swashbuckling story set in the imagined lands of Angora and Exina.

== Plot summary ==
The fantasy created by the four youngest Marlow children (twins Nicola and Lawrie, Ginty and Peter) and their friend Patrick Merrick, takes up three chapters of the book. Matters reach a climax when Patrick, in character, wields an old pistol which Peter has previously found in the loft. Alarmed, Nicola knocks it from his hand, whereupon it hits a table and is discharged, bringing their activities to adult attention, in the form of the Marlow's sister Rowan. Peter's Room is also notable for the beginnings of a romance between Ginty (recognised as the best-looking of the Marlow sisters) and Patrick. Nicola, previously a good friend of Patrick's, is left feeling sidelined, especially at a New Year's Eve party given by the Merrick family.

== Reception ==
Peter's Room was a commended runner-up for the Carnegie medal in 1961.
