= Joan Mary Wayne Brown =

British writer of romance novels and books for girls (1906–98)

Mary Gervaise, Hilary Wayne and Bellamy Brown was the pseudonym of Joan Mary Wayne Brown, a prolific writer of romance novels and books for girls, publishing over 70 books. She was born on 21 April 1906 and died on 26 April 1998. A bout of anaemia caused her to pursue writing at the age of 18, rather than attending college.

Her children's books were written as Mary Gervaise. Most of them are school stories, but the Georgia and Belinda series are pony books.

== Bibliography ==
=== As Bellamy Brown ===
- Sweet And Kind (1947)
- Gay Experiment (1949)
- The Brightness of Day (1949)
- Life Comes To Caroline (1950)
- So Many Counsellors (1951)
- It Happened to Hilary (1952)
- The Lamp In The Room (1953)
- The Fair One (1954)
- When Love Is Green (1955)
- Moonlight, Starlight (1956)
- The Innocent Flower (1957)
- Wish For A Whirlwind (1958)
- Dangerous Destiny (1959)
- The Proud Giants (1959)
- Wild Legacy (1960)
- Solitaire (1962)
- Strange Melody (1964)
- One A Nurse (1965)
- Beware of Loving (1966)
- The Country Door (1969)

=== As Mary Gervaise ===
==== Georgia Series ====
- A Pony of Your Own (1950)
- Ponies And Holidays (1950)
- Ponies In Clover (1952)
- Ponies and Mysteries (1953)
- Pony From the Farm (1954)
- The Pony Clue (1955)
- Pony Island (1957)
- The Vanishing Pony (1958)
- Puzzle Of Ponies (1964)
- The Secret of Pony Pass (1965)

==== Belinda Series ====
- A Pony for Belinda (1959)
- Belinda Rides To School (1960)
- Belinda's Other Pony (1961)
- Belinda Wins Her Spurs (1962)

==== Farthingale Series ====
- Fireworks At Farthingale (1954)
- The Farthingale Feud (1957)
- The Farthingale Fete (1958)
- The Farthingale Find (1961)

==== Other books ====
- Don-Margery Schoolgirl (1928)
- The Fourth-and Fenella (1928)
- Tiger's First Term (1928)
- A Term on Trial (1929)
- Form Two of Rock House (1929)
- Nancy No-Good at School (1929)
- Ray at Greenwater (1930)
- That Imp Miranda (1930)
- The School on The Hill (1930)
- Topsy the Terrible (1930)
- Miranda at Merryfield (1931)
- Tam at the Gables (1931)
- Captain Miranda (1932)
- Marigold and Dandelion (1932)
- The Twins In The Third (1932)
- Nutmeg at School (1933)
- The Keppelthwaite Mystery (1933)
- The Little Red Car (1933)
- Pat of Patricks (1934)
- The Black Castle Mystery (1934)
- Joan Finds a Way (1935)
- Mysterious Sally (1935)
- Nepeta’s First Term (1936)
- Penelope, Pickles and Pam (1936)
- The Secret of Primrose Cove (1936)
- Pat in the Fifth (1937)
- The Isle of Mystery (1937)
- The Dauntless Clan (1938)
- The Distance Enchanted (1938)
- Two In A Tangle (1938)
- The Jade Image (1939)
- The Two Veronicas (1939)
- Caroline Crusoe (1941)
- The Rainbow Comes (1944)
- A Guest From France (1946)
- Jane Grows Up (1947)
- A Year with Jennifer (1949)
- Five Tigers and a Mouse (1949)
- The Seventh Sanderson (1949)
- Golden Path Adventure (1953)
- Biddy Makes Her Mark (1956)
- The Secret of Golden Path (1956)
- Golden Path Pets (1957)
- Strangers at Golden Path (1958)
- Mandy, Dandy & Co (1962)
- The Painted Swan (1962)
- Lucy In Luck (1963)
- The Proving Of A Paragon (1964)

=== As Hilary Wayne ===
- Two Odd Soldiers (1946)
- Tickletoby (1949)
- Vainglorious (1950)
- The Backward Glance (1953)
- Flame of the Forest (1954)
- Flower of the Night (1955)
- No Star Is Lost (1956)
- The Beckoning Rose (1956)
- Candle In the Sun (1957)
- Isle of Whispers (1959)
- Reckless Heart (1959)
- Love Is A Talisman (1961)
- River Of Pearls (1962)
- The Secret Bird (1962)
- Cross My Heart (1963)
- The Crooked Rainbow (1970)
- Love Lost The Way (1970)
- Perilous Freedom (1972)
