= Autumn Term =

1948 novel by Antonia Forest

- First edition [2nd impression] cover
- Author: Antonia Forest
- Language: English
- Publisher: Faber and Faber
- Publication date: 1948
- Publication place: United Kingdom
- Media type: Print (hardback & paperback)
- ISBN: 0-571-06521-X (hardback edition)
- OCLC: 13968369
- Followed by: The Marlows and the Traitor

Autumn Term is the first in the series of novels for children about the exploits of the Marlow family, written by Antonia Forest and published in 1948. Set in the post-war years, the novel narrates the school life of the two youngest Marlows, identical twins Nicola and Lawrence, during their first term at the fictional 'Kingscote School for Girls'. The series then continues with The Marlows and the Traitor.

== Context ==
Forest claimed she aspired to write adult fiction and that she wrote Autumn Term to improve her chances of being published, hoping that a school story for children might meet with greater success. However, Autumn Term differs from other examples of the genre. Hence, the heroines, Nicola and Lawrie (Lawrence), are often unsuccessful in their endeavours and are at times unsympathetic, whilst the antagonist Lois Sanger is portrayed as having redeeming traits.

== Plot summary ==
Nicola makes an inauspicious start to her career at Kingscote School when she drops her leaving present, a penknife, out of the train and pulls the communication cord so that she can jump out to retrieve it. She and her twin then suffer the indignity of being placed in a Remove form, when all their sisters have always been in A forms. The misery is compounded when they discover that Removes are not even allowed to play netball.

Since there is nothing else they can do, they join the school Guide Company and hope to shine there. All goes well until a hike down to the beach is planned. Nicola and Lawrie offer to take a shortcut through a farmyard in order to get the campfire lit. Unfortunately a haystack on the farm is found burned down later that afternoon and the twins are the prime suspects. Lois Sanger, their Patrol Leader, should be the one to take responsibility but instead twists the story to make herself look good. After an agonizing Court of Honour, the twins are asked to leave the company.

Halfterm with the family gives opportunity for the elder Marlows to laugh at the twins' failures. Nicola takes advice from her eldest brother, Giles (a lieutenant in the Navy), that she should concentrate on what she is good at - being bad! A few weeks later, when things are particularly miserable at school, she remembers his advice. She takes the train down to Port Wade to visit Giles and his ship. When she gets there, she realises that she has not enough money for the return ticket and that she has no idea where to find Giles. Eventually she tracks him down and, although he is singularly unimpressed with her, he does at least put her on the train back to school.

The second half of term is dominated by the fundraising efforts of the Third form. The other classes are organising a Bazaar, and offer Third Remove the Jumble and Kitchen stalls. Preferring to do their own thing, Third Remove put on a play. Tim (Thalia) Keith, niece of the Headmistress, writes a version of The Prince and the Pauper so that Nicola can be Edward VI and Lawrie can play Tom Canty, the beggar boy who looks just like the king.

The play is saved by Lois Sanger who agrees to read the narration for them, in an attempt to atone for her actions in the Guide company. Nicola is unreconciled, but acknowledges that Lois does read well. However, it is Lawrie who is the star of the show, carrying the rest of the cast with her.

Nicola, alone of Third Remove, makes a respectable showing in the end of term exams. However, the rest of the form are more than satisfied to have earned the epithet 'brilliant eccentrics' from one of the Sixth Form, if a little embarrassed to discover that through Nicola's efforts they have also won the Form Tidiness Prize.

== Kingscote School for Girls ==
Kingscote School for Girls is a fictional girls' boarding school, the setting of four of the novels in the Marlow series. The school is located in Wade Abbas – a fictional town elevated to city status by the presence of Wade Minster, a cathedral. The books are set in a mythical landscape taking in elements from all over southern Britain, from Sussex to Pembrokeshire, and Forest said that she had based Wade Minster itself on Chichester Cathedral.

Kingscote, though a boarding school, is based in many ways on Forest's own (day) school, South Hampstead High School, which she attended between 1921 and 1934. It takes in pupils from about 6 or 7 right through to sixth form (16–18), and has forms divided into A, B and (in certain years) Remove. Like South Hampstead, the school plays netball, hockey, rounders and cricket (Forest herself played for the school in netball, hockey and cricket), and many of the teachers at Kingscote are based to an extent on those who taught Forest.
