= Clare Mallory =

New Zealand children's author (1913–1991)

- Born: Winifred Constance McQuilkan; 25 September 1913; Invercargill, New Zealand
- Died: 20 April 1991 (aged 77)
- Education: Southland Girls' High School; University of Otago (MA); Somerville College, Oxford
- Occupation: Writer
- Spouse: Frank Hall (m. 1949)
- Writing career
- Pen name: Clare Mallory

Clare Mallory is the pen name under which Winifred Constance McQuilkan Hall (25 September 1913 – 20 April 1991) wrote ten children's books published between 1947 and 1951.

Clare Mallory is primarily remembered as a superior exponent of the girls' school story. Prior to her marriage she was headmistress of a day and boarding school in Dunedin, New Zealand, and in her short autobiography published in Hugh Anderson's The Singing Roads (Wentworth Press, 1965) she describes her first books as coming from stories she made up to entertain her students while they prepared food parcels for Britain.

== Biography ==
Clare Mallory was born Winifred Constance McQuilkan in Invercargill, New Zealand, in 1913. She attended Southland Girls' High School where she was dux in 1930, University of Otago in Dunedin where she studied English and Classics, graduating with an M.A., and Somerville College, Oxford, where she gained a First in English. She returned to New Zealand to teach, first at Otago Girls' High School and then as headmistress of Columba College, Dunedin, in 1942. She left that position when she married Frank Hall in 1949. After their marriage the couple lived in London for a few years but came back to New Zealand in 1952, and Mallory lived there until her death in 1991.

== Literary influences ==
The Encyclopaedia of Girls' School Stories describes Mallory as 'one of the best exponents of the classical school story'(p. 211). She doesn't break new ground but rather stays true to the traditional elements of the genre, populating her stories with tall, authoritative Head Girls, forceful Games Captains, respected albeit distant Head Mistresses and a cast of likeable juniors of assorted ages. If there is a recurring theme to her stories it is the importance of belonging. Mallory's parents died whilst she was a teenager, and she completed her schooling while living in lodgings. Mallory's heroes relish the ties that bind. Merry is 'second generation Tremaynes', Juliet travels 12,000 miles to attend the school her grandfather helped found, Leith thinks she is looking for a particular friend but discovers instead the value of belonging to a community.

Mallory dedicated Juliet Overseas to Josephine Elder, author of what she described as 'the best school story I know'. Her admiration for Elder's book Evelyn Finds Herself was later reflected in Leith and Friends in which she uses a similar framework to explore the same themes of friendship and self-discovery. In The Singing Roads, Mallory identifies Leith and Friends as having been 'hailed in England as the best school story for many years'(p. 60). Elder's influence on Mallory's writing can also be seen in The League of the Smallest which is thematically linked to Elder's 1927 school story Thomasina Toddy.

== Bibliography ==
"Merry" series

  - Merry Begins (OUP, 1947) (republished by Girls Gone By Publishers, 2004)
  - Merry Again (OUP, 1947; republished by Girls Gone By in 2005)
  - Merry Marches On (OUP, 1947) (republished by Girls Gone By Publishers, 2005)

N.B. At the end of Merry Marches On there is a note citing a fourth book Tremaynes Trans Tasman as being in preparation. In her article in The Singing Roads, Mallory states that she has renamed this book Merry In Australia and is working on it. In fact, no book of either title was ever published. Someone who worked at the Melbourne office of OUP still recalled fifty years later how frequently they received queries from the public about it.

  - The Pen and Pencil Girls (OUP, 1948?) (republished by Girls Gone By Publishers, 2010)
  - Juliet Overseas (OUP, 1949) (republished by Girls Gone By Publishers, 2006)
  - The New House at Winwood (OUP, 1949) (republished by Girls Gone By Publishers, 2008)
  - Tony Against the Prefects (OUP, 1949)
  - Leith and Friends (OUP, 1950) (republished by Girls Gone By Publishers)
  - The Two Linties (OUP, 1950) (republished by Margin Notes, 2012)
  - The League of the Smallest (OUP, 1951) (republished by Girls Gone By Publishers, 2009)
