= Malory Towers =

Children's novels by Enid Blyton

- Book 1 of the series
- First Term at Malory Towers; Second Form at Malory Towers; Third Year at Malory Towers; Upper Fourth at Malory Towers; In the Fifth at Malory Towers; Last Term at Malory Towers
- Author: Enid Blyton
- Country: United Kingdom
- Language: English
- Genre: Literature, bildungsroman
- Published: 1946–1951
- No. of books: 12

Malory Towers is a series of six novels by English author Enid Blyton. The series is based on a girls' boarding school that Blyton's daughter attended, Benenden School, which relocated during World War II to the Hotel Bristol in Newquay, Cornwall. The series follows the protagonist, Darrell Rivers, on her adventures and experiences in boarding school. Darrell Rivers' name was inspired by that of Blyton's second husband, Kenneth Darrell Waters.

In 2009, six more books were added to the series by author Pamela Cox. Events in these take place after Darrell has left the school and focus on her younger sister, Felicity Rivers.

== Plot summaries ==
=== First Term at Malory Towers ===
Darrell Rivers begins her first year at Malory Towers, a castle-like clifftop boarding school in Cornwall. She meets sharp-tongued, cheeky Alicia, musical genius Irene and timid Mary-Lou. Determined to do well and make friends, Darrell's first term is tempestuous. Her temper causes problems and her efforts at playing the fool backfire. Another new girl is Gwendoline Mary Lacey, who turns out to be vain, shallow and prone to occasional spitefulness and bullying. The Malory Towers stories largely centre on the intertwined stories of Darrell and Gwendoline, along with Alicia Johns, Sally Hope and Mary-Lou. The first book ends with Darrell finding a best friend in Sally Hope.

=== The Second Form at Malory Towers ===
The girls move into the Second form at Malory Towers with a new form mistress, Miss Parker, and three new girls. In an eventful term, new tricks are played on the teachers and the girls make the unpleasant discovery that there is a thief in their midst. Among the newcomers, Belinda delights the other girls with her sharply drawn caricature drawings, while Ellen worries about her position in the form and overworks herself. Mary-Lou is nearly blown off the cliff when she tries to deliver a parcel for Daphne, who rescues her and in doing so manages to find courage and strength of character she didn't think she had.

=== Third Year at Malory Towers ===
Darrell and her friends are now in the Third Form, alongside more new girls. Wilhelmina, known to all as Bill, is obsessed with horses. There is also Mavis, who has a beautiful singing voice, which she foolishly risks when she attends a local talent contest and finds herself stranded at night outside the school in a rainstorm. Darrell has a smaller role in this story, mainly centred around her inclusion in a school lacrosse team.

=== Upper Fourth at Malory Towers ===
Sibling relationships are a theme of the fourth book, with the arrival at Malory Towers of Darrell's younger sister Felicity, Alicia's younger cousin June, and twins Connie and Ruth Batten. The fourth formers are working hard for the tough School Certificate examination, which quick-brained Alicia finds unexpectedly hard when she succumbs to measles. Darrell is Head Girl of lower school, but is forced to resign when her temper gets the better of her once more. A sickly new girl, Clarissa, had suffered from a heart disease, which later gives Gwendoline the idea of avoiding the examination by affecting a heart condition, which leads to a bitter confrontation.

=== In the Fifth at Malory Towers ===
The Fifth Form is asked to produce the school Christmas entertainment, which they decide should be the pantomime Cinderella. Darrell is the lead writer and Irene composes the music, while lead roles are taken by Alicia, Mary-Lou and Bill. Gwen finds herself much in the company of new girl Maureen who, to her discomfort, shares many of her vain and shallow traits. The Head Girl of the Fifth is the hard and domineering Moira, which creates much friction between the girls before matters are resolved and the show is triumphantly staged. Darrell realises she has a talent for writing and that this may be her future career.

=== Last Term at Malory Towers ===
In her final year, Darrell is now Head Girl of the school. In a frank exchange with Miss Grayling, they agree that the only real failure in Darrell's year is Gwendoline, and Darrell undertakes to do what she can to try and set Gwen on a more positive path before it is too late. But Gwen is destined to get a huge shock that forces her to re-evaluate her future and bitterly regret some cruel words to her father. New girl Amanda clashes with June over games coaching, while second former Jo runs away from the school after stealing money from Matron.

=== Pamela Cox books ===
The second series of six books follows Felicity, Darrell's younger sister, from her third year to her final term. Sally's younger sister, Daffy, eventually joins the school when Felicity and her friends are in the sixth form. The final book of the new series, Goodbye Malory Towers, sees the return of the original cast, including Darrell, Sally, and Alicia, for a school reunion, and the addition of Gwendoline Mary Lacey to the teaching staff.

== Origins and inspirations ==
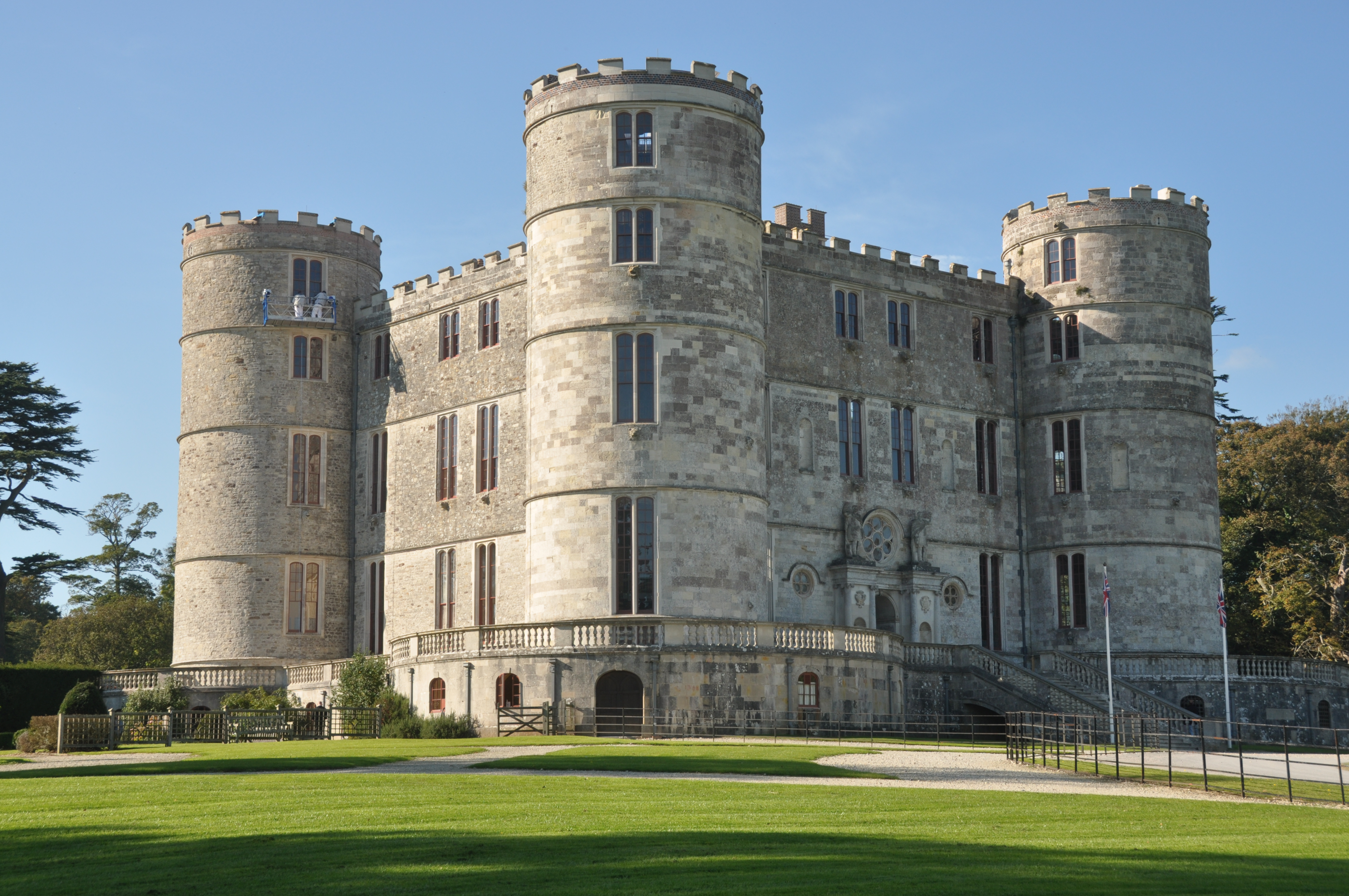
Lulworth Castle, believed by commenters to have inspired the design for Malory Towers.

Enid Blyton's elder daughter Gillian joined Benenden School in the autumn of 1945. The school had relocated from its original site in Kent during World War II to the Hotel Bristol in Newquay, Cornwall. Although Gillian was only at the Cornish location of Benenden School for one term before it moved back to Kent, Malory Towers' position on the west coast (as shown on the maps drawn for the endpapers of the books) matches that of Beneden School in Newquay. Other features of the school seem to be inspired by Dorset, where Blyton holidayed annually: the coastal swimming pool is similar to the one at Dancing Ledge, and the school building itself is similar to Lulworth Castle.

Commenters have also remarked on the parallels between Gillian's school life, as recorded in her diaries, and the plots of the Malory Towers books. It is even suggested that the Malory Towers stories were Blyton's way of communicating with her daughter and providing counsel. The similarities include Darrell's temper, interests in an acting career, and obsessions with horses. As with Darrell in the books, Gillian's (step) father was also a surgeon.

The incident in the first book that depicts Darrell pushing over Sally has a close parallel to an incident between Gillian and her younger sister Imogen. The entry in her diary reads:

'Imo annoyed me and I got in one of my tempers and knocked her down. She might have hurt herself. Really, I just don’t know what I do when in a temper. I might easily kill her one day.'

The plotline in "Third Year" that introduces the character Zerelda Brass, who has aspirations to become an actress, also has a parallel in Gillian's diaries. A memo in the back of her 1946 diary reads:

'In the letter Mummy wrote she said she thought I would make a good actress and that if I wanted to be an actress she and Daddy would back me up. She said she was glad I was able to analyse my feelings. She said I had the right sympathetic feelings for an actress. She was very nice and I love her.'

== School building ==
In its first appearance, the school is described thus:

She saw a big, square looking building of soft grey stone standing high up on a hill. The hill was really a cliff, that fell steeply down to the sea. At each end of the gracious building stood rounded towers. Darrell could glimpse other towers as well, making four in all. North Tower, South, East and West.

Each tower acts as a boarding house and provides accommodation for about 60 girls, ten in each year group. There is a Matron in each tower and a House Mistress in overall charge. The towers have four storeys, with kitchen, dining hall and common rooms on the ground floor, dormitories on the first and second floors, and staff rooms and storage are on the top floor.

The school forms a square with a courtyard in the middle. The sides of the school are three storeys high. The front of the building, between the east and south towers, has the main entrance, gymnasium, assembly hall, laboratories and art room. The classrooms are between the west and the north towers. Between the north and east towers are the sanitorium and the headmistress's rooms. The mistress's rooms are between the south and west tower.

The school also has a rose garden, stables, tennis courts, sports pitches and an outside, natural swimming pool cut into the coastline.

== Main characters (Enid Blyton novels) ==
The principal characters among the girls in the Enid Blyton books are:

=== North Tower girls in Darrell's year ===
- Darrell Rivers is the main character of the first six books. Although responsible and hard-working, her hot temper causes her problems, but she learns to control it as she goes up the school. She is very popular with her form. In the upper school she becomes Head of the Fourth Form, games captain in the Fifth and finally, in the Sixth Form, Head Girl of the school. As she gets older at Malory Towers she begins to realise her talent for writing and aspires to be a writer in her adult career.
- Gwendoline Mary Lacey is vain, shallow and occasionally prone to spiteful tricks and bullying. In Darrell's final term, she and Headmistress Miss Grayling have a frank exchange where they agree that Gwen is a rare failure at Malory Towers. Soon after, Gwen is shocked when her father falls seriously ill and is in danger of his life. Shamefully remembering some of the cruel things she said to him while demanding that he sends her to a Swiss Finishing School, Gwen finally starts to re-evaluate her life.
- Alicia Johns is sharp-tongued and is the form joker, playing endless tricks on the teachers. Her quick mind enables her to easily cope with her academic work, and her pranks and jokes make her popular with other girls. However, she is also sharp-tongued and scornful of those less talented or healthy than her. She softens during her years at Malory Towers but is never given any role of responsibility because of her fondness for playing the fool.
- Sally Hope arrives at Malory Towers at the same time as Darrell, and the two become best friends. Jealousy is a persistent issue with Sally – her resentment of her younger sister is at the root of Sally's withdrawn and odd behaviour during her first term, before matters are resolved. She tries to overcome her jealousy during her time at Malory Towers, but occasionally it continues to be a problem for her. Sally becomes Head of Form in her second year and games captain in the Sixth Form.
- Mary-Lou Linnet is a quiet, shy girl, described as having "big, scared eyes." However, her courage and character develops as she moves through the school. She forms a threesome of friends with Darrell and Sally before finally finding a friend of her own, Daphne, who appears in the second form.
- Katherine is the head girl of the First Form in First Term at Malory Towers. She is a typically fair minded and straightforward character who stands no nonsense.
- Emily Lake is a quiet member and withdrawn member of the first form in First Term at Malory Towers whose main interest is sewing. Darrell invites her to tea with her parents at half term.
- Violet is described as shy and colourless, very much left out of things. She is mentioned once in First Term at Malory Towers and disappears from the stories thereafter.
- Jean MacDonald is a jolly, shrewd Scottish girl, adept at handling money for various school societies and charities. She becomes head of the form in Third Year at Malory Towers.
- Irene Edwards is a musical genius with a talent for mathematics, but is otherwise scatterbrained. A running theme is her repeated loss of her health certificate at the beginning of each term. She is best friends with the equally scatterbrained Belinda.
- Ellen Wilson – a new girl who joins in The Second Form at Malory Towers as a scholarship girl. She worries about her work and is described as having a pale, tired face.
- Belinda Morris arrives in The Second Form at Malory Towers and delights the other girls with her talent for drawing cartoons. She quickly becomes best friends with Irene, as the two are equally disorganised and prone to daydreaming.
- Daphne Millicent Turner joins in The Second Form at Malory Towers and initially befriends Gwendoline, before dramatic events throw her together with Mary-Lou, with the two becoming firm friends.
- Whilhemina Robinson known as "Bill" joins in Third Year. She is obsessed with horses and her horse, Thunder, is stabled at the school during term time.
- Zerelda Brass is an American girl who joins in Third Year at Malory Towers, who has ambitions to be an actress.
- Mavis Allyson arrives the term before Third Year at Malory Towers. Her boastfulness and pride in her singing voice leaves her unpopular among the other girls.
- Connie and Ruth Batten are twins that arrive in Upper Fourth at Malory Towers. Connie is described as boastful, conceited, thick-skinned, confident and protective of Ruth. By contrast, Ruth is withdrawn and rarely speaks up for herself, leaving her twin to speak for both of them. The relationship between Connie and Ruth drives a dramatic climax at the end of Upper Fourth.
- Clarissa Carter when she first arrives at Malory Towers is described as a shy, meek and easily manipulated girl with a weak heart which does not allow her to do sports. Later on she is seen to be a sweet kind girl with a love for horses she shares with Bill her best friend. She is described to have long auburn hair, green eyes behind thick-glassed glasses and straight teeth hidden behind an ugly wire during the majority of her first term.
- Moira Linton appears during Darrell's fifth year and is appointed Head Girl of the form. She is domineering and hard.
- Maureen Little joins in the fifth form and shares many of Gwen's vain and shallow traits.
- Catherine Gray is described as a "doormat," making herself very humble to the other girls and apologising on their behalf in In the Fifth at Malory Towers.
- Janet – a talented seamstress who appears in In the Fifth at Malory Towers, having stayed in the Fifth from the previous year.
- Amanda Chartelow joins in Last Term at Malory Towers from her previous school Trenigan Towers. She is tall and athletic, with ambitions to compete in the Olympic Games.
- Suzanne is Mam'zelle Rougier's niece who joins the school in Last Term at Malory Towers. Alicia mischievously teaches her a number of spoof words, which she innocently uses, and it is with her encouragement that the second formers play tricks on Mam'zelle Dupont in the sixth form classroom.

=== North Tower girls in other years ===
- Felicity Rivers is Darrell's younger sister who comes to Malory Towers in Upper Fourth at Malory Towers. Like her older sister she makes a shaky start with her friendships, but by the end of her first term has made friends with Susan.
- June Johns is Alicia's cousin who is in Felicity's form. Like her cousin, she is mischievous and troublesome, but not as good-hearted, and she hurts many other girls' feelings.
- Susan Blake is Felicity's best friend. She is sensible and responsible but has a good sense of humour and is popular among her form.
- Pam Bateman is described to be a placid, kind and very good-natured friend. Her best friend is Nora. She is head of the form in the Second Form.
- Nora Woods is the best friend of Pam Bateman. She is one of Mam'zelle Dupont's favourites. Nora is a big-hearted girl and popular with everyone. She is a scatterbrain, just like Darrell's friends Irene and Belinda.
- Josephine Jones is in the second form in Last Term at Malory Towers. Her rich father spoils her and encourages her into bad habits such as making no effort in her academic work.
- Deirdre Parker is a first form girl who runs away from school with Jo Jones in Last Term at Malory Towers. She is excused from punishment by Miss Grayling, who recognises that Jo Jones influenced the younger girl.
- Pamela is a Sixth Former and Head Girl in First Term at Malory Towers.
- Marilyn is a Sixth Former and Captain of Games in First Term at Malory Towers.
- Molly Ronaldson is Games Captain in Darrell's third year when Darrell is trying get into the school lacrosse team.
- Bridget Linton is Moira's younger sister, who is in the fourth form in In the Fifth at Malory Towers.

=== Girls in other towers ===
- Betty Hill is Alicia's best friend from West Tower and is very similar to Alicia. For this reason, she is not permitted to move into North Tower with Alicia, as the headmistress, Miss Grayling feels sure the two would be insufferable together. Betty is the only girl from another tower to appear regularly in the books.
- Eileen and Winnie are West Tower girls, friends of Betty, who come to the midnight feast in Upper Fourth at Malory Towers.

=== School staff ===
- Miss Grayling is the headmistress. She is sensible and strict, but also kind, gentle and wise.
- Mam'zelle Dupont is one of the two French mistresses. She is the victim of many of the girls' tricks and pranks, although she has a very hot temper. Because of her general jolliness and good humour though, she is popular with the girls.
- Mam'zelle Rougier is the other French mistress. She is as stern as Mam'zelle Dupont is jolly. Not many students dare to misbehave in her class as she hands out harsh punishments.
- Miss Potts is the First Form mistress and House Mistress of North Tower. She is strict and always has an eye on mischief-makers such as Alicia and June.
- Miss Parker is the Second Form mistress.
- Miss Peters is the Third Form mistress.
- Miss Williams is the Fourth Form mistress.
- Miss James is the Fifth Form mistress.
- Miss Oakes is the Sixth Form mistress.
- Matron looks after the girls' health and wellbeing in North Tower. Each tower has its own Matron.
- Miss Hibbert is the English and Drama mistress.
- Miss Linnie is the art mistress.
- Miss Donnelly is the sewing mistress.
- Mr Young is the music teacher.
- Miss Carton is the history mistress.
- Miss Remmington is the games mistress.

=== Other characters ===
- Mrs Rivers – Darrell's mother.
- Mr Rivers – Darrell's father, a surgeon.
- Mrs Lacey – Gwendoline's mother.
- Mr Lacey – Gwendoline's father.
- Miss Winter – Gwendoline's former governess.
- Mrs Hope – Sally's mother.
- Mr Hope – Sally's father.
- Mr Jones – Josephine Jones' father.
- Mrs Jones – Josephine Jones’ mother.

== Main characters (Pamela Cox novels) ==
=== North Tower girls in Felicity's year ===
- Winifred Holmes known as "Freddie" becomes June's best friend in mischief when she attends Malory Towers during Felicity's third year.
- Amy Ryder-Cochrane is snobbish and haughty, though kind-hearted at times. She is vain, lazy and enjoys being the centre of attention.
- Bonnie Meadows is Felicity's neighbour who first appears in New Term at Malory towers. She constantly annoys Felicity and Susan – whom she dislikes for being Felicity's best friend.
- Veronica Sharpe is described as a sneak and a hypocrite who listens behind doors.
- Lucy Carstairs is a horse-mad girl who arrives in Felicity's third year with her horse Sandy. She rapidly becomes friends with Julie and is a cousin of Esme.
- Esme Walters is Lucy's American cousin who arrives during the same term as Lucy, and with whom she has to face a family conflict.
- Olive Witherspoon appears as a reserved girl, who is spiteful, bad-tempered and sneaky because of a family problem.
- Sylvia Chalmers is pushy and bossy with a loud voice.
- Millicent Moon is a musical genius with a gift for playing musical instruments.
- Delia Norris describes herself as a duffer, but discovers she has a talent.
- Gillian Weaver is Delia's best friend. Likes to play music for an orchestra.
- Alice Johnson is a pseudonym for Josephine Jones who returns during Felicity's final year.
- Lizzie Mannering is serious and obsessed with her studies, rooted in a resolve to repay her uncle for her school fees.

=== North Tower girls in other years ===
- Eleanor Banks is described as a "particularly unpleasant fifth-former" who hates June and has a horse named Snowball.
- Daphne Hope known as "Daffy," is Sally Hope's younger sister who arrives during Felicity's sixth year at Malory Towers.
- Katie is Daffy's best friend since preparatory school.
- Violet Forsyth appears in Secrets at Malory Towers as a spoiled snob, frequently boasting about her family's wealth.
- Faith is the first form head girl during Daffy's first year.
- Ivy is one of Daffy's followers and friends. Her personality is described to be blunt, forthright and outspoken.
- Edith Mannering is Daffy and Katie's best friend, and the younger sister to Lizzie Mannering of the sixth form.

=== School staff ===
- Miss Tallant replaces Miss Hibbert for one term during Felicity's fourth year. She is spiteful to the pupils, especially to June.
- Miss Lacey is "Gwendoline Mary Lacy" who comes back for Felicity's last term to teach Etiquette.
- Miss Nicholson is the Geography mistress, a close friend of Miss Lacey.

=== Other characters ===
- Mrs Dale is Amy's grandmother.
- Daisy is a maid that bullies Gwendoline during her first term as a teacher.

== Books ==
The six official books of the series are:

1. First Term at Malory Towers (1946)
2. The Second Form at Malory Towers (1947)
3. Third Year at Malory Towers (1948)
4. Upper Fourth at Malory Towers (1949)
5. In the Fifth at Malory Towers (1950)
6. Last Term at Malory Towers (1951)

Pamela Cox wrote six sequels of the series in 2009 which focus on the adventures of Felicity Rivers, June Johns and Susan Blake:

1. New Term at Malory Towers (2009)
2. Summer Term at Malory Towers (2009)
3. Winter Term at Malory Towers (2009)
4. Fun and Games at Malory Towers (2009)
5. Secrets at Malory Towers (2009)
6. Goodbye Malory Towers (2009)

=== Related books ===
Blyton wrote two other series about boarding-school life: the St. Clare's and the Naughtiest Girl series.

== Adaptations ==
=== German adaptation ===
The German version, published in the 1960s and 1970s underwent substantial changes to catch up with time (e.g. turntables instead of gramophones), to better resemble German grammar schools (playing handball instead of lacrosse). Furthermore, there were changes to character names – for instance, Darrell was renamed Dolly. From 1977 to 1997, twelve sequel books were published, telling Dolly's further life which always stays close to the school: after studying at a partner university, she works as a house mistress, marries one of the teachers, and has a child of her own. The story ends in the 18th book with old Miss Grayling's dignified retirement – and Dolly as her successor.

=== Stage musical ===
A stage production written and directed by Emma Rice and her company Wise Children has been touring theatres in 2019. It is a co-production with York Theatre Royal, in association with the Bristol Old Vic.

=== TV series ===
In 2019, it was announced that a television adaptation was being produced for British television channel CBBC, in association with Canada's Family Channel. It was developed by Rachel Flowerday, who had previously worked on the television series Father Brown, and Sasha Hails. It specifically included a cast with members of BAME communities and actors with facial disfigurements. It premiered on 23 March 2020. Season 1 has 13 half-hour episodes about Darrell's first year at Malory Towers.

Until 2025 six sequel seasons and one christmas special were published, with seasons 2-7 following book 2-6 (book 6 split in two halves), and the christmas episode staying outside the books' narrative. With Darrl leaving the school the story concludes.
