= List of British children's and young adults' literature titles (1900–1949) =

This is a list of British children's and young adults' literature titles including the representative titles of authors listed in List of British children's and young adults' authors (1900–1949). This list has no more than six titles per author.

- The Abbey Series (1914–1959)
- Biggles Flies East (1935)
- Billy Bunter of Greyfriars School
- Brendon Chase (1944)
- The Camels Are Coming (1932)
- Dimsie Goes To School (1925; originally The Senior Prefect [1921])
- Dimsie Moves Up (1921)
- Five Children and It (1902)
- Five on a Treasure Island (1942)
- The Hobbit (1937)
- The House at Pooh Corner (1928)
- Just Jane (1928)
- Just William (1922)
- The Little Grey Men (1942)
- The Little Lost Hen (1946)
- A Little Princess (1905)
- The Lord of the Rings (books completed by J. R. R. Tolkien in 1948)
  - The Fellowship of the Ring (1954)
  - The Two Towers (1954)
  - The Return of the King (1955)
- The Lost Prince (1915)
- The Little Bookroom (1955)
- The Magic World (1912)
- Meredith and Co. (1933)
- The Mystery of the Burnt Cottage (1943)
- No Boats on Bannermere (1949)
- Old Peter's Russian Tales (1916)
- The Once and Future King
  - The Sword in the Stone (1938)
  - The Queen of Air and Darkness (1939)
  - The Ill-Made Knight (1940)
  - The Candle in the Wind (first published in the composite edition, 1958)
- Peter and Wendy (1911)
- Peter Pan in Kensington Gardens (1906)
- The Phoenix and the Carpet (1904)
- A Popular Schoolgirl (1920)
- The Railway Children (1906)
- The Railway Series (1945)
- The School at the Chalet (1925)
- The Secret Garden (1911)
- The Squirrel, The Hare and the Little Grey Rabbit (1929)
- The Story of the Amulet (1906)
- The Story of Doctor Dolittle (1920)
- Swallows and Amazons series
  - Swallows and Amazons (1930)
  - Swallowdale (1931)
- The Tailor of Gloucester (1903)
- The Tale of Mrs. Tiggy-Winkle (1905)
- The Tale of Peter Rabbit (1902)
- The Tale of the Pie and the Patty-Pan (1905)
- The Tale of Squirrel Nutkin (1903)
- The Tale of Tom Kitten (1907)
- The Wind in the Willows (1908)
- Winnie-the-Pooh (1926)

== See also ==
- Books in the United Kingdom
