= List of British children's and young adults' authors (1900–1949) =

This is a list of British children's and young adults' authors active between 1900 and 1949. The authors listed here are arranged by year of birth.

- Frances Hodgson Burnett (1849–1924)
- Mary Francis Ames (1853-1929)
- Mrs George de Horne Vaizey (1857–1917)
- E. Nesbit (1858–1924)
- Kenneth Grahame (1859–1932)
- E. E. Cowper (1859–1933)
- J. M. Barrie (1860–1937)
- Herbert Hayens (1861-1944)
- Rudyard Kipling (1865–1936)
- Beatrix Potter (1866–1943)
- Angela Brazil (1868–1947)
- Percy F. Westerman (1876–1959)
- Frank Richards (1876–1961)
- Elsie J. Oxenham (1880–1960)
- Eleanor Farjeon (1881–1965)
- A. A. Milne (1882–1956)
- Arthur Ransome (1884–1967)
- Dorita Fairlie Bruce (1885–1970)
- Hugh Lofting (1886–1947)
- Ruth Manning-Sanders (1886–1988)
- Alison Uttley (1886–1976)
- Evadne Price (1888–1985)
- Richmal Crompton (1890–1969)
- J. R. R. Tolkien (1892–1973)
- W. E. Johns (1893–1968)
- Elinor Brent-Dyer (1894–1969)
- Enid Blyton (1894–1969)
- George Mills (1896–1972)
- Joyce Lankester Brisley (1896–1978)
- Dodie Smith (1896–1990)
- C. S. Lewis (1898–1963)
- John F. C. Westerman (1901–1991)
- Denys Watkins-Pitchford ("BB") (1905–1990)
- T. H. White (1906–1964)
- Mary Norton (1903–1992)
- Rev. W. Awdry (1911–1997)
- Roald Dahl (1916–1990)

== See also ==
- List of British children's and young adults' literature titles (1900–1949)
