= The Book of Merlyn =

Novel by T. H. White

The Book of Merlyn (Once and Future King)
- First edition
- Author: T. H. White
- Illustrator: Trevor Stubley
- Language: English
- Genre: Fantasy
- Publisher: University of Texas Press
- Publication date: 1977
- Media type: Hardcover
- Pages: 137
- Preceded by: The Once and Future King

The Book of Merlyn is an Arthurian fantasy book by British writer T. H. White. It is the conclusion of The Once and Future King, but it was published separately and posthumously.

== Plot summary ==
The book opens as King Arthur prepares himself for his final battle. Merlyn reappears to complete Arthur's education and discover the cause of wars. As he did in The Sword in the Stone, Merlyn again demonstrates ethics and politics to Arthur by transforming him into various animals.

The last chapter of the book takes place only hours before the final battle between King Arthur and his son and nephew Mordred. Arthur does not want to fight after everything that he has learned from Merlyn. He makes a deal with Mordred to split England in half. Mordred accepts. During the making of this deal, a snake comes upon one of Mordred's soldiers. The soldier draws his sword. The opposing side, unaware of the snake, takes this as an act of betrayal. Arthur's troops attack Mordred's, and both Arthur and Mordred die in the battle that follows.

Guenever joins a convent, and remains there till death. Lancelot becomes a hermit and dies a hermit. His last miracle was making the room that he died in smell like heaven.

== Concept and creation ==
White was inspired to write this book upon determining that the key theme of Malory's Le Morte d'Arthur is to find an "antidote for war". Rather than containing a distinct plot, this book reads more like a discourse on war and human nature.

White had revised The Sword in the Stone (1938), The Queen of Air and Darkness (1939), plus The Ill-Made Knight (1940) to weave in the anti-war theme. In November 1941 White sent the revisions along with The Candle in the Wind (part 4) and The Book of Merlyn (part 5) to his publisher with the intent that all five parts be published together as a single book. The publisher declined due to wartime paper shortages and White's antiwar message.

White salvaged parts of the rejected text by including scenes from The Book of Merlyn in the revised The Sword in the Stone part of The Once and Future King that was published in 1958.

== Rediscovery and publication ==
The Harry Ransom Humanities Research Center of the University of Texas at Austin purchased the bulk of White's personal papers and manuscripts between 1967 and 1969. In 1975 the original manuscript for The Book of Merlyn was discovered amongst this collection, and was prepared for publication by the University of Texas Press in 1977, as The Book of Merlyn: The Unpublished Conclusion to The Once and Future King, with a prologue by Sylvia Townsend Warner and illustrations by Trevor Stubley.
