= Arthur Marshall (broadcaster) =

British writer, raconteur and broadcaster

Arthur Marshall, MBE (10 May 1910 – 27 January 1989) was a British writer, raconteur and broadcaster, born in Barnes, London in the UK. He was best known as a team captain on the BBC's Call My Bluff.

== Early life ==
Charles Arthur Bertram Marshall was the son of Charles Marshall, an electrical engineer from Colchester and Dorothy, née Lee, from Manchester. He was enrolled at the kindergarten section of the Froebel Institute in Hammersmith in 1916, for two years, and then went to Ranelagh House, a co-educational school overlooking Barnes Common. In the summer of 1920 his father moved the family to Newbury in Berkshire and Arthur was sent away to a preparatory boarding school, Edinburgh House School, which later became Ballard School, on the Hampshire coast where his brother was already a pupil. He described it later as a 'traumatic experience'. He was educated at Oundle School from 1924 to 1928, and Christ's College, Cambridge from 1928 to 1931, where he studied modern languages, became President of the Cambridge University Amateur Dramatic Club, and wanted to be an actor. His obsession with the theatre had begun at the age of four when he had been taken to see Peter Pan, played by Madge Titheradge, at the Kings Theatre, Hammersmith. At Cambridge Marshall appeared as Elizabeth in Somerset Maugham's The Circle in 1929 and his performance was praised by George Rylands. The last play in which he appeared for the ADC was directed by Rylands, a production of George Bernard Shaw's Captain Brassbound's Conversion, starring Michael Redgrave in the title role and who was, according to Noel Annan, 'acted off the stage by Arthur Marshall as Lady Cicely'.

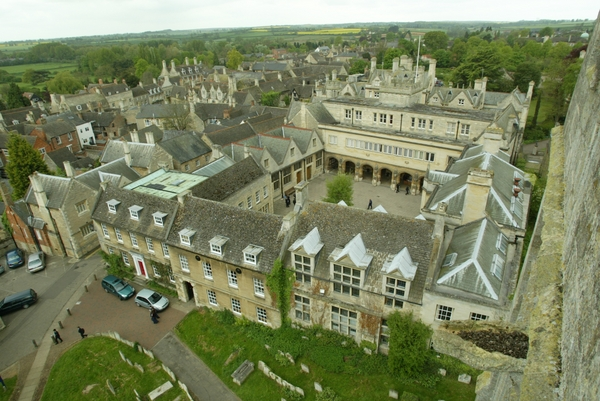
Marshall arrived as a pupil at Oundle School in north-eastern Northamptonshire in the summer term of 1924 and left in May 1928. He returned 'in a magisterial capacity' – though he had wanted to pursue a theatrical career – in 1931. Later he decided that teaching was a kind of acting.

== Early career ==
As Marshall could not find enough acting work, or convince his parents that they should support his desire to pursue a career in the theatre, in 1931 he became a teacher of modern languages, again at Oundle School. His first work in entertainment was writing scripts for three-minute radio sketches. In 1934 a BBC producer asked him to appear on Charlot's Hour, a late-night radio revue. He signed a contract in 1935 with Columbia and made five gramophone records featuring sketches involving headmistresses and schoolgirls – he was an avid reader of books for girls from childhood and had been performing skits from the early 1930s for his friends. He began reviewing for the New Statesman in 1935 too at the invitation of the literary editor Raymond Mortimer who admired his skits. He was asked to contribute an article each Christmas on the best books for girls published during the year – Angela Brazil was nearing the end of her career but Winifred Darch, May Wynne and Dorita Fairlie Bruce were still very productive. World War II interrupted this reviewing of books for girls.

== World War II ==
During World War II Marshall's knowledge of French and German led to his being enrolled in the British Intelligence Corps, and he was soon sent as part of the British Expeditionary Force to northern France. After the rapid German advance he became a part of the Dunkirk evacuation. He wrote in his autobiography, "Absence of food, coupled with exhaustion, made the nights seem unusually cold and there is little of comfort, save protection of a sort, to be found in a sand dune. One's childhood love of sand and beaches disappeared in a trice." Back in England he spent three months with a security section on the Cumbrian coast before being sent to Lisburn in Northern Ireland. In April 1942 he was transferred to the London headquarters of Combined Operations in Richmond Terrace, off Whitehall. He was appointed a security officer and by the end of 1943 was transferred to the headquarters of Supreme Headquarters Allied Expeditionary Force in Bushy Park, Twickenham. In 1945 Marshall was in Flensburg and lodged on Adolf Hitler's yacht at the time that Alfred Jodl and Wilhelm Keitel were being interrogated. At the end of the war, with the rank of lieutenant-colonel, and an MBE, he returned to Oundle School as a Housemaster.

== Later career ==
During and immediately after World War II, Marshall had some success on radio and the stage. His wartime radio programme A Date with Nurse Dugdale was popular, and he wrote numerous revue sketches for performers such as Hermione Gingold. He appeared on radio and TV occasionally and published books of humorous pieces among other writings. The most widely known of these were his skits on the life and antics of girls at private schools. From a relatively early age he had been an ardent admirer of the girls' school stories of Angela Brazil. He found them hilarious, although he noted "Miss Brazil had, of course, no comic intention when she started, in 1906, to write her books." His writing about girls' school stories has been criticised as misogynist and lacking in substance.

In 1954 he left Oundle and, after being private secretary to Victor, Lord Rothschild, worked for the London theatrical firm H. M. Tennent. In the 1950s, he began work in the theatre in London as a scriptwriter and also began having his humorous books published. He adapted the novel Every Third Thought by American writer Dorothea Malm into the play Season of Goodwill. This starred Sybil Thorndike and Gwen Ffrangcon-Davies, but was not a success. He also wrote the British version of the French play Fleur de Cactus which had been adapted for the American stage by Abe Burrows as Cactus Flower. This starred Margaret Leighton and Tony Britton and was a hit on the West End stage, until Leighton left to go to Broadway.

As he became better known he appeared on radio and television (although his first radio broadcast had been in 1934), and then in 1979 began his time as a regular team captain on Call My Bluff, which continued until shortly before his death. Marshall took over from Patrick Campbell. They had been friends for many years, since they both used to write, from around 1948 onwards, for Lilliput.

Marshall was also a newspaper and magazine columnist, writing for The Sunday Telegraph in the 1970s and 1980s. His association with the New Statesman ended in 1981 when he was sacked from its "First Person" column by editor Bruce Page, allegedly for being overtly sympathetic to Margaret Thatcher. He had been writing the column since January 1976, when then-editor Anthony Howard asked him to replace Auberon Waugh, who had gone to The Spectator. During that time Marshall also compiled several collections of the best entries from the weekly New Statesman literary competition, embracing parodies and pastiches.

Having retired to Devon in 1970, he lived in Christow for the last fifteen years of his life, where he shared a cottage with Peter Kelland, a former schoolmaster. Their home, Pound Cottage, was the 'Myrtlebank' from which he sent despatches to the New Statesman and Sunday Telegraph. He suffered a minor heart attack in 1988; he began writing the second part of his autobiography, but died shortly after a more serious illness.

In 1985, Marshall revealed on the British game show All Star Secrets that he had always wanted to do a cameo as a motel guest on the serial Crossroads. This was arranged and he subsequently appeared in the episode broadcast on 4 April 1985, where he is recognised by one of the main characters, Jill Chance (played by Jane Rossington) and chats with her about his work over a drink in the motel bar.

== Personal life ==
In his autobiography, Life's Rich Pageant, Marshall was quoted as saying, "I cannot help being happy. I've struggled against it but to no good. Apart from an odd five minutes here and there, I have been happy all my life. There is, I am well aware, no virtue whatsoever in this. It results from a combination of heredity, health, good fortune and shallow intellect."

Marshall is believed to have been homosexual but never publicly commented on the subject.

== List of writings ==
- Nineteen to the Dozen
- Girls will be Girls (1974)
- I Say! (1977)
- I'll Let You Know (Musing from 'Myrtlebank') (1981)
- Smile Please (Further musings from 'Myrtlebank') (1982)
- Life's Rich Pageant (autobiography) (1984)
- Sunny Side Up (1988)
- Follow The Sun (1990)

He also edited Salome, Dear, not in the Fridge; Never Rub Bottoms with a Porcupine; Whimpering in the Rhododendrons; and Giggling in the Shrubbery.

== Bibliography ==
- Bailey, Paul (2001). Three Queer Lives: an Alternative Biography of Fred Barnes, Naomi Jacob and Arthur Marshall. London: Hamish Hamilton. ISBN 0-241-13455-2.
- Marshall, Arthur (1990). Follow The Sun: a Further Selection of the Writings of Arthur Marshall. London: Sinclair-Stevenson. ISBN 1-85619-022-6.
- Marshall, Arthur (1984). Life's Rich Pageant. London: Hamish Hamilton. ISBN 0-241-11306-7.
- Stevens, Christopher (2010). Born Brilliant: The Life Of Kenneth Williams. John Murray. ISBN 978-1-84854-195-5.
