= Ladycross School =

Former school in East Sussex, England

Coordinates: 50.7745°N 0.1323°E

Ladycross was a Catholic preparatory school in Seaford, East Sussex. It was founded in 1891 in Briely Road, Bournemouth, and moved to a purpose-built school in Eastbourne Road, Seaford in 1909.

More than 2,000 pupils attended it before its closure in 1977. Among its schoolmasters was children's book author George Mills, who taught during the summer of 1956. The school was located on its own 15-acre premises in Seaford from 1909 until 1978, apart from a short period during the Second World War when at the height of the German bombing raids on British towns in 1941, the school was temporarily evacuated to Salperton Park, Gloucestershire.

== History ==
The school was founded in 1891 by Alfred Roper, who later passed it onto his son Tony Roper. Tony Roper had no descendants and in the early 1950s, as he became more elderly, he sought a successor as owner and headmaster from among the parents of children at the school. The only parent interested was Michael Feeny who was a descendant of a Birmingham Catholic family and who had one son at the school at the time. As a school teacher and classicist himself, Feeny had experience in the education business, and ran the school over the next quarter century in conjunction with long-serving staff members.

Approaching retirement in the early 1970s at a time when private education appeared under threat, Feeny could have sold the land to private developers at a considerable profit, but instead sought ways of keeping the school in operation. Having tried unsuccessfully to relocate the school to a larger inland location and unable to find a suitable successor as buyer and headmaster, he set up a trust and handed over the school and land in Seaford and all its assets to this Trust.

However, financial issues escalated, resulting in the sale of the site to a property developer and the eventual closure of the school, despite the last-minute desperate attempt to raise funds from old boys. In 1978, the school buildings were knocked down to make way for a housing estate.

== School life ==
The school motto was Vox vocis sonat, vox exempli tonat (also a school anthem which roughly translates as "The voice of the voice sounds, the voice of example thunders"). A yearbook called The Red Book provided a summary of annual sports and academic achievements, photos, stories and news, from and for parents and old boys.

About 150 pupils were divided into four “houses” for termly competition purposes in academics and sports: Athenians (red), Spartans (green), Ropers (yellow), and Herberts (blue). Boys were provided a pupil number on admission with name and number tags sewn into every item of clothing. The uniform in winter was brown tweed jacket and shorts (trousers for the prefects) and in summer became a combination of tan shorts and airtex shirt for daily wear and for formal weekend wear, a bright red blazer, white shirt and red tie, with grey flannel shorts. For sporting events such as football, rugby, and cricket the boys won colours - a special tie and, in the summer, a striped blazer. The school had an outdoor swimming pool and two grass-courts (Clay Iles, former British champion came to coach tennis). Archery and rifle shooting were optional activities as was carpentry, gardening and photography. Marching in step drills and daily cold showers were compulsory for the senior four years. Boxing used to be mandatory from the lowest grade but was made voluntary in the school's final year (judo was offered instead); only one pupil in the senior two years declined to participate in boxing. Music (mainly piano and recorder), art and handicraft (called 'hobbies') were available. Pantomimes were organised and a chapel choir allowed pupils to hone their voices. Boys were taken for long afternoon walks over the Downs.

A small number of pupils came from France, Belgium, Spain or the Philippines, some following in the footsteps of parents.

There was an annual Prize Day in the summer, with cine footage from the 1970's showing marching boys.
