= The Master: An Adventure Story =

1957 novel by T. H. White

The Master
- First edition (UK)
- Author: T. H. White
- Language: English
- Genre: Science fiction
- Publisher: • Jonathan Cape (UK) • G. P. Putnam's Sons (US)
- Publication date: 1957
- Publication place: United Kingdom
- Media type: Print (hardcover)
- Pages: 256
- OCLC: 504128135
- LC Class: PZ3.W5854 Mas2 FT MEADE

The Master: An Adventure Story is a 1957 science fiction adventure novel by English author T. H. White.

== Plot summary ==
It involves two children, Judy and Nicky, and their dog Jokey, who are stranded on Rockall, an extremely small, uninhabited, remote rocky islet in the North Atlantic Ocean. They find that it is hollow and inhabited by a mysterious person who aims to take over the world.

== Characters ==
=== The captives' family ===
- Nicky: He is resistant to telepathy, and the Master hopes to train him as a successor.
- Judy: She is more susceptible to the Master's mind control.
- Jokey: Judy's mongrel dog, about the size of a Skye Terrier.
- The Duke: The twins' father. His estate in England is called Gaunt's Godstone.
- The Duchess: The twins' mother, first name "Fanny."
- Mr. Pierrepoint: The Duchess's brother, the twins' uncle.

=== The captors' team ===
- The Master: 157 years old, he communicates by telepathy, which he can also use to control people's minds. He has invented a kind of vibrator-ray to take over the world.
- Mr. Blenkinsop ("the Chinaman"): His Chinese name means "Golden Tiger in the Tea Forest", but he took the name Blenkinsop while studying at Oxford University. The Master befriended him at first because he found the Chinese language superior to English for expressing his ideas, but now he and Blenkinsop communicate by telepathy.
- Dr. Totty McTurk: Originally a ship's surgeon named Jones. Although probably Welsh, he affects various accents (Irish, Scottish, Cockney and Australian) when talking with the children.
- Pinky or Pinkie: Sometimes referred to as "the negro" or "the blackamoor," he is the island's cook. He is mute, his tongue having been cut out. He is a follower of Gandhian nonviolence.
- Squadron-Leader Frinton: Pilot of the helicopter which carries mail and supplies between Rockall and Ireland. He tries to help the children escape.

== Major themes ==
Like White's better-known work, The Once and Future King (1958), The Master deals with moral questions of killing, war and peace, and response to evil.

== Allusions ==
=== References to other works ===
- The novel makes several allusions to the play The Tempest by William Shakespeare and begins and ends with quotations from the play.
- In trying to impress upon the children the meaning of the Master's great age, Mr. Frinton says:

"Dr. Moreau," Mr. Frinton went on, "was experimenting on his island and the Iron Pirate was at sea and She was living her immortal life in Africa when the Master was about ninety. Stevenson wrote Treasure Island when he was eighty-four. Captain Nemo was sailing in the Nautilus when he was seventy. Henry Russell Wallace [sic] thought of the origin of species when he was around sixty. Mary Shelley wrote Frankenstein when he was coming of age, and at the battle of Waterloo he was four years older than you are.:

=== References to actual history, geography and current science ===
- In the opening chapter, White delineates a brief history of the exploration of Rockall, starting with legends of St. Brendan and Atlantis and continuing with visits by Martin Frobisher (1578), Basil Hall (1810), the Helen (1824), HMS Porcupine (1862), the Royal Irish Academy (1896), Jean-Baptiste Charcot (1921), and Michael Bizony (1948). He mentions the British annexation of Rockall (1955) and says it may have been precipitated by the events of The Master (rather than the novel being inspired by the annexation).
- The novel refers to post-World War II events and public figures including US President Dwight D. Eisenhower, Soviet Premier Nikita Khrushchev and British Prime Minister Anthony Eden.
- Mr. Frinton compares the Master's age with that of other purportedly long-lived people: Old Tom Parr, Henry Jenkins, and the Countess of Desmond.

== Television adaptation ==
In 1966, Southern Television made a six-part television dramatisation starring Adrienne Posta and Paul Guess, with Olaf Pooley as the Master.

== See also ==
- 1957 in literature
- List of novels
