= Trevor Stubley =

British artist

- Born: 27 March 1932; Leeds, England
- Died: 8 January 2010 (aged 77); Holmfirth, England
- Education: Leeds College of Art, Edinburgh College of Art
- Known for: portraiture, landscape, illustration

Trevor Stubley RP RBA RSW RWS (27 March 1932 – 8 January 2010) was a Yorkshire portrait and landscape painter, and illustrator.

Stubley was born in Leeds and received art training at Leeds College of Art, and in 1953 at Edinburgh College of Art. He was a lecturer at Huddersfield School of Art from 1958 to 1960, afterwards working as a freelance artist from his own studio at Upperthong.

Stubley received 500 portrait commissions (including those for the HM the Queen, Alan Ayckbourn, Dame Judi Dench, J B Priestley and Dame Janet Baker), illustrated over 400 children's books, and painted landscape watercolours in 18 countries for the last 23 years of his life. He exhibited within Yorkshire, Lancashire, Nottinghamshire, Ireland and the USA, and his paintings are held in private and public collections, particularly at the National Portrait Gallery, Windsor Castle, the Palace of Westminster, the British Library, various universities throughout the UK, and at his own gallery on the outskirts of Holmfirth.

From 1994 to 1999, Stubley served as Vice President of the Royal Society of Portrait Painters, and was made an honorary member of the society in 2003. He died in Holmfirth, aged 77.

== Prizes ==
- 1955 – Andrew Grant Major Travelling Scholar
- 1955 – William Hoffman Wood Gold Medal for Painting
- 1981–82 – Yorkshire TV Fine Art fellowship
- 1982 – Arts Council Award
- 1986 – Hunting Group Art Prize
- 1990 – Singer and Friedlander/Sunday Times Prize

== Selected illustrated books ==
- Bradburne, Elizabeth S. (1968) Hey Diddle Dumpling; Schofield & Sims Ltd. ISBN 0-7217-0154-X
- Mayne, William (1968) The Yellow Aeroplane; Reindeer Books / Hamish Hamilton. ISBN 0-241-91345-4
- Naughton, Bill (1975) The Goalkeeper's Revenge; London: Macmillan
- Boshell, Gordon (1977) Captain Cobwebb and the Mischief Man; Macdonald & Jane's. ISBN 0-354-08009-1
- White, T. H. (1978) The Book of Merlyn: The Unpublished Conclusion to The Once and Future; Berkley Medallion. ISBN 0-425-03826-2
- Dale, Alan T. (1979) Portrait of Jesus; Oxford University Press. ISBN 0-19-278021-2
- Cate, Dick (1980) Old Dog, New Tricks; Puffin Books. ISBN 0-14-031270-6
- Pinto, Jaqueline (1983) The School Dinner Disaster; Hamish Hamilton Ltd. ISBN 0-241-11117-X
- Andrews, Ian (1987) Boudica Against Rome (Cambridge introduction to world history); Cambridge University Press. ISBN 0-521-33559-0. Illustrated with Graham Humphreys.
- Escott, John (1987) Radio Alert; Puffin Books. ISBN 0-14-032124-1
- Mahy, Margaret (1987) Clancy's Cabin; Puffin Books. ISBN 0-14-032175-6
- Hardcastle, Michael (1989) Free Kick; Mammoth. ISBN 0-7497-0127-7
