= Mary Strange Reeve =

Miniaturist, book illustrator, and commercial artist

- Born: 9 January 1891; Walthamstow, Essex, England
- Died: 28 March 1974 (aged 83); Loughton, Essex, England
- Other name: Mary Strange Reynolds
- Occupations: Miniaturist, book illustrator, and commercial artist
- Known for: Illustrating girls' school stories

Mary Strange Reeve (9 January 1891 – 28 March 1974) was an English miniaturist, book illustrator, and commercial artist. Her most lasting work is probably her illustrations for girls' school stories.

== Biography ==
Mary Strange Reeve was born at Walthamstow, Essex on 9 January 1891. Her father, Gilfrid Reeve, was a Brewer's Clerk, rising to the position of Brewer's Managing Clerk by 1911. Her mother was Alice Margaret Strange. Reeve was the third child of six.

Reeve married Walter Deveson Reynolds MBE MICE (Note: Reynolds was awarded the MBE for his part in the Salonika campaign (which included the operations at Gallipoli. He had joined the Royal Naval Division, Royal Marines Divisional Engineers as a Sapper, the most basic enlisted rank in the engineers, in Deal on 21 September 1914. He served in Gallipoli in 1915, and obtained a commission in the Royal Engineers as a temporary Second Lieutenant on 17 January 1916.) (8 November 1886 – 2 April 1980) on 26 September 1931, at Saints Peter and Paul's Church in Chingford.

In 1939 Reeve was living with her husband at Pemberley, 82 Tycehurst Hill, Loughton, Essex. She was still living at that address when she died on 28 March 1974, leaving an estate valued at £47,187. Her husband survived here by six years and was still living at Pemberley when he died on 2 April 1980. His estate was valued at £78,298.

== Works ==
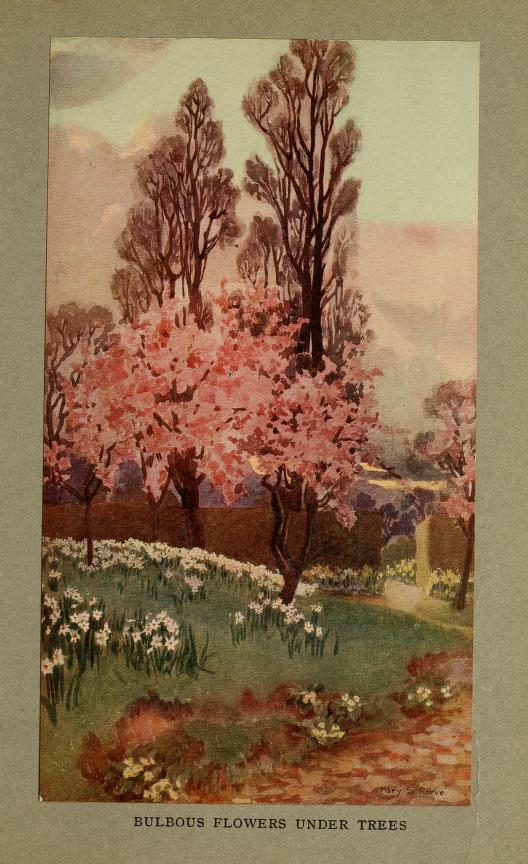
Bulbous flowers under trees in the 1915 publication Every woman's flower garden : how to make and keep it beautiful

Reeve exhibited seven works at the Royal Academy between 1917 and 1926. She was on the staff of the Oxford University Press.

The following bibliography is based on a search on the Jisc Library Hub Discover database. (Note: The Jisc Library Hub Discover brings together the catalogues of 165 major UK and Irish libraries. Additional libraries are being added all the time, and the catalogue collates national, university, and research libraries.) supported by other sources (as indicated). It does not include the annuals, such as Mrs. Strang's Annual for girls which Reeve also illustrated.

Novels illustrated by Reeve
| Ser | Year | Title | Author | Publisher | Pages | Notes |
|---|---|---|---|---|---|---|
| 1 | 1923 | The Hunter Children | Natalie Joan | OUP, London | 254 p., (8º) | (Note: With Grace Lodge) |
| 2 | 1923 | Meg of the Brownies | Margaret Stuart Lane | OUP, London | 254 p., (8º) | (Note: With Gordon Browne) |
| 3 | 1924 | Cecil of the Carnations | Winifred Darch | OUP, London | 256 p., (8º) | |
| 4 | 1925 | Dimsie, head-girl | Dorita Fairlie Bruce | OUP, London | 280 p., 5 ill. (1 col.), (8º) | |
| 5 | 1926 | The New Girl and Nancy | Dorita Fairlie Bruce | OUP, London | 288 p., (8º) | |
| 6 | 1926 | The new school and Hilary | Winifred Darch | OUP, London | 255 p., 5 ill., (1col.), (8º) | |
| 7 | 1927 | Dimsie Goes Back | Dorita Fairlie Bruce | OUP, London | viii, 277 p., ill. (1 col.), (8º) | |
| 8 | 1930 | The new house captain | Dorita Fairlie Bruce | OUP, London | vi, [1], 7-288 p., ill., (8º) | |
| 9 | 1930 | The Fifth Form Rivals | Winifred Darch | OUP, London | 95 p., col. Ill., 8º | (Note: Details from Sims and Clare) |
| 10 | 1931 | The school on the moor | Dorita Fairlie Bruce | OUP, London | 285 p., 8º | |
