= The Candle in the Wind =

Book by T.H. White

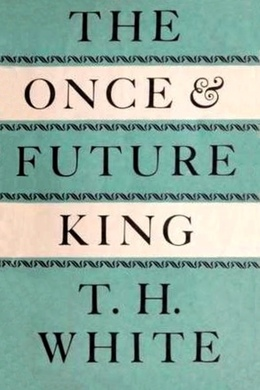
- First edition (of the collection)
- Author: T. H. White
- Language: English
- Genre: Fantasy
- Publisher: Collins
- Publication date: 1958
- Publication place: United Kingdom
- Media type: Print (Hardback & Paperback)
- Pages: 208
- ISBN: 0-441-00383-4 (paperback edition)
- OCLC: 35661057
- Dewey Decimal: 823/.912 21
- LC Class: PR6045.H2 O5 1996
- Preceded by: The Ill-Made Knight
- Followed by: The Book of Merlyn

The Candle in the Wind is a fantasy novel by English writer T. H. White, the fourth book in the series The Once and Future King. Written in 1940, it was first published in 1958 in the collected edition. It deals with the last weeks of Arthur's reign, his dealings with his son Mordred's rebellion, the consequences of Lancelot and Guinevere's affair, and Arthur's reflections on justice and war.

== Setting ==
At the start of The Candle in the Wind, White paints a bleak picture of daily life. Knights have enriched themselves and are building lavish castles, while peasants starve. The bishop of Bath is denied the position of archbishop because he has "too many" illegitimate children. King Arthur is tied up in a siege on Lancelot's Joyous Guard, as Mordred seeks to create trouble.

== Plot ==
The story begins with Mordred and Agravaine, both discontented. Mordred hates his father, King Arthur, and Agravaine hates Sir Lancelot. Their views are not shared by Gawaine, Gareth, or Gaheris. The relationship of Lancelot and Guinevere has gone on for some time, and everyone in the court knows of it. No one, however, publicly speaks of it, as the law would require Lancelot to be killed and Guinevere to be burned at the stake.

In order to wreak their revenge Mordred and Agravaine decide to go to the king and charge the Queen with adultery. Troubled by this, King Arthur agrees to leave on a hunting trip to give the knights a chance to catch the Queen with Lancelot, although he does say that if they are caught, he hopes that Lancelot will be able to kill all witnesses and adds that if the two fail in backing their claims, he will see to it that they are pursued by the law themselves.

At the same time Arthur confesses to Guinevere and Lancelot a terrible secret: when Mordred was born, Arthur had been told by many people that the child would be evil, as a result of the incest (between himself and his half-sister, Morgause). Pressured, the king commanded all babies born in the approximate month that Mordred would be born to be placed on a boat, which was then sunk. Mordred managed to survive, however, and Arthur lived with the guilt of causing the death of the other babies.

The king leaves to go hunting and Lancelot prepares to sneak over to Guinevere's room. Before he can leave, Gareth visits him, and warns him of Mordred's and Agravaine's plot. Lancelot receives Gareth warmly, but does not take the threat seriously as he does not believe that Arthur would entertain such an idea. He leaves for the Queen's room without weapons or armour, assuring Gareth that they will all laugh together when the king returns.

In Guinevere's room, Lancelot laughingly tells her of Gareth's warning. Unlike him, however, the Queen takes the threat seriously and tries to convince him to leave before they are caught. A group of knights attempts to break into Guinevere's room. Lancelot manages to kill one of them, later revealed to have been Agravaine, and takes his weapon and armour to defeat the rest. Mordred escapes to tell Arthur of the Queen's faithlessness. Lancelot is forced to flee Camelot, but promises to return to rescue Guinevere.

Though Arthur is unwilling to kill his wife, he is obliged to obey his own laws and prepares for her execution. Mordred faces scorn and anger from his half-brothers, who are furious with him for turning in the Queen and accuse him of being a coward for running away from his fight with Lancelot. Arthur later explains to them that Mordred survived because Lancelot was unwilling to kill Arthur's son.

When Mordred learns that Lancelot will return to prevent Guinevere's execution he demands that Arthur put more guards in the town. While Gawaine refuses to take part in the events, Gareth and Gaheris are stationed as additional guards. Just as Guinevere is about to be burned, Lancelot rides in and rescues her. Much to Gawaine's horror, it is discovered that in his haste to reach the Queen, Lancelot has killed Gareth and Gaheris before he could recognize them.

Guinevere and Lancelot flee to France, and request forgiveness from the Pope. It is granted and Guinevere is permitted to return to Camelot. Lancelot remains in France, where Arthur is forced to fight him for honour. After spending several mornings taunting Lancelot as a traitor and a coward, Gawaine receives a blow to the head that gravely injures him.

In Camelot, Mordred is left to rule in Arthur's stead. He corners Guinevere, and tells her that he intends to overthrow Arthur and take her as his wife, as revenge for Arthur sleeping with Mordred's mother. Guinevere manages to send a message to Arthur. Gawaine dies.

Arthur then returns to England to stop Mordred. On the eve of battle, in a state of semi-consciousness, Arthur remembers Merlyn's lessons. To make sure that his legacy lives on, even if he dies in the battle, he explains his ideas to a young serving boy, Tom of Warwick, who is Thomas Malory of Warwickshire. He tells the boy that his idea of peace was like a candle in the wind, which he kept alight only with an effort. The book ends with Arthur sending Tom away to safety and becoming ready to face the coming battle "with a peaceful heart". Arthur acknowledges that he will perhaps come again to try to create another perfect Round Table, and remembers the times he spent with Merlyn. (In The Book of Merlyn this is when Merlyn appears and takes Arthur away for a debate on war and humanity.) Either Arthur dies in battle, or he is set adrift to Avalon, where his wounds may be healed so that he may rule again.

== Allusions/references in other works ==
The Lerner and Loewe musical Camelot, first performed in 1960, was adapted from White's The Once and Future King, with most of the musical drawing on The Ill-Made Knight and The Candle in the Wind.
