= Leonard Potts =

English academic and translator (1897–1960)

Leonard James Potts (3 December 1897 – 31 August 1960) was an English academic, translator, and specialist in literary comedy. As an author he was usually credited as L. J. Potts.

A fellow of Queens' College, Cambridge, Potts translated works by Aristotle and Strindberg, and his long correspondence with T. H. White has been published.

== Early life ==
Born in Stanground, Huntingdonshire, Potts was a son of the Rev. J. E. Potts, later Rector of Thurcaston. He was educated at Harrow School and Trinity College, Cambridge, where he graduated B.A. in 1922, gaining a First in the English Tripos. This was later promoted to M.A. by seniority.

Between school and college Potts was commissioned as a second lieutenant into the Royal Garrison Artillery, seeing active service during the First World War. In May 1918 he was promoted to lieutenant.

== Career ==
Potts spent two years as a lector at Uppsala University, which resulted in a translation into English of the Sagor (Tales) of August Strindberg.

In 1924, Potts was elected as a fellow of Queens' College, Cambridge, and was later its Senior Tutor and Librarian. In 1928 he became a university lecturer in English.

Among the undergraduates Potts tutored was T. H. White, who graduated in 1928 and looked on Potts as "the great literary influence in my life." They wrote to each other until Potts’s death, and the result was Letters to a Friend: The Correspondence Between T. H. White and L. J. Potts (1984).

Potts’s major critical publication was Comedy (1948), a study of comedy as seen in drama and narrative works, mainly in English, from Geoffrey Chaucer to George Bernard Shaw. In 1953, he published a full translation of the Poetics of Aristotle, explaining in his introduction that by "poetics" Aristotle meant simply "fiction". He was criticized by philosophy scholar D. A. Rees in the Philosophy journal for using the English title Aristotle on the Art of Fiction, as it was "to narrow dangerously the wide gap between Aristotle and ourselves", but was later praised by W. S. Howell for having the "creative genius to bring his translation out under the title".

When he died in 1960, an obituary said of Potts that he was "an attractive and lovable person, an ideal conversationalist".

== Personal life ==
On 12 August 1930, in the Presbyterian Church of England at Egremont, Merseyside, Potts married Mary Winifred Crighton, of Wallasey. They lived in Bateman Street, Cambridge. Potts died in August 1960, at Saint-Cernin, in the Auvergne, France, leaving an estate valued at £6,615. His widow, who had been born in 1905, remained in Cambridge and survived him until 1982.

== Selected publications ==
- Tales by August Strindberg, translated by L. J. Potts (Phoenix Library, 1930)
- Comedy (Hutchinson's University Library, 1948)
- Aristotle on the Art of Fiction: an English translation of Aristotle's Poetics with an Introductory Essay and Explanatory Notes (Cambridge University Press, 1953; second edition, 1959)
- Letters to a Friend: The Correspondence Between T. H. White and L. J. Potts, ed. François Gallic (New York: G. P. Putnam's Sons, 1982), ISBN 0-399-12693-7.
