= Gordon Boshell =

British writer (1908–1991)

- Born: 1908; Blackburn, Lancashire, England
- Died: 1991 (aged 82–83); Worthing, West Sussex, England
- Occupations: Journalist, Poet, Information Officer, Scriptwriter, Editor, Novelist
- Writing career
- Language: English
- Period: 1941–1980
- Genre: Fiction
- Notable work: Captain Cobwebb

Gordon Boshell (1908–1991) was born in Blackburn, Lancashire and was a journalist and writer. He wrote for the Daily Mail and also worked as a scriptwriter and a feature editor for the BBC.

In 1951 Boshell left Fleet Street to join The World Health Organization as an information officer. During this time he worked in South East Asia and the Western Pacific, as well as in the organisation's headquarters in Geneva. Boshell returned to Britain in 1967 after which he and his wife lived in Wells, Somerset.

Boshell's first published book was "My Pen My Sword" a collection of poetry originally published in the Daily Mail. The book was subtitled "Bee of the Daily Mail" which may have been Boshell's alias. Boshell then published two adult novels ("John Brown's Body", "Dog's Life"). His early works were influenced by the Second World War. For example, his poem "The Aeroplane" was written after watching the Battle of Britain dogfights from the streets of London.

On returning to the UK Boshell began writing children's books, beginning with the "Captain Cobwebb" series for which he is best known. He also wrote a trilogy of books known as "The Secret Guardians" series.

Boshell co-created the "Garth" comic strip with Steve Dowling.

== The Captain Cobwebb Series ==
The front cover art of the Armada Books paperback reprint of Captain Cobwebb and the Red Transistor illustrated by Graham Thompson

The "Captain Cobwebb" books are a series of 11 children's novels written by Gordon Boshell between 1967-1980. The main characters in the book are David & Toby Green, two brothers who live in Dingle Down village, and their Uncle Septimus Cobwebb, a.k.a. "Captain Cobwebb".

As a young man, Uncle Septimus decided to spend all night sitting in a fairy ring. As a result, he went off to live with the fairies, becoming invisible. The books usually begin with the boys getting bored, e.g. during a rainy day, or lying ill in bed, and then calling on their Uncle to send them on an adventure, usually in a far-off magical land.

In the first book both the boys and their parents contact Uncle Septimus. The boys' father tells them the story of his brother going off to live with the fairies and how to contact him. By writing a letter to their uncle, burning it to ash and then letting the ashes blow into the wind, they are able to send him a message. The adventure begins immediately. After their first adventure ("Captain Cobwebb") Uncle Septimus rewards the boys with a magical blue spot on their hand which they can touch to request an adventure.

The boys' adventures take them to various magical lands and so the books have a number of different themes e.g. Pirates, Cowboys & Indians. As well as a range of heroic characters, and talking animals, the stories typically include a range of more unusual characters, creatures and situations.

Some examples of characters and creatures in the book include:

- The Refined Gorilla—a talking Gorilla who escaped from London Zoo aided by an aging Admiral. After a career as a sailor the Gorilla becomes king of a city of monkeys
- Captain Morgan—a vicious pirate with a razor sharp metal nose who tortures his captives by pecking them; the villain of "Captain Cobwebb"
- The Puertl-Fowl—a bird that can only lay its eggs after dark, in the footprints of sailors
- Fanty the Elephorse—a cross between a horse and an elephant
- The Ugudugu-djuk—a subterranean hermit who digs his own tunnels underneath the desert
- Hildrok the Outcast—part human, part snake and part bird of prey; the villain of "Captain Cobwebb and the Red Transistor"
- Wurgs—a kind of hovering flat-fish with tentacles, that live in caverns underneath the ground

The books included a number of illustrations. The first two books were originally illustrated by the author, the third by Raymond Fishwick, and the rest by Trevor Stubley. The first five books had paperback reprints by Armada Books with new illustrations by Graham Thompson. Several of the stories included maps, e.g. of Dingle Down or treasure maps. These maps were drawn by Boshell himself.

In total, Boshell wrote 11 books in the Captain Cobwebb series.

1. Captain Cobwebb
2. Captain Cobwebb's Cowboys
3. Captain Cobwebb's Cobra
4. Captain Cobwebb's Adventurers
5. Captain Cobwebb and the Red Transistor
6. Captain Cobwebb and the Crustaks
7. Captain Cobwebb and The Chinese Unicorn
8. Captain Cobwebb and the Mischief Man
9. Captain Cobwebb and the Quogs
10. Captain Cobwebb and The Magic Drops
11. Captain Cobwebb and the Amazing Cloud

== The Secret Guardians Series ==
Three non-Captain Cobwebb books published by Target.

1. The Black Mercedes
2. The Million Pound Ransom
3. The Mendip Money Makers

== Bibliography ==
- Boshell, Gordon; (1941) My Pen My Sword; Hodder and Stoughton
- Boshell, Gordon; (1942) John Brown's Body; Secker and Warburg
- Boshell, Gordon; (1945) Dog's Life: a satirical novel
- Boshell, Gordon; (1967) Captain Cobwebb; Chatto & Windus, ISBN 0-701-10033-8; Armada, ISBN 0-006-91126-9
- Boshell, Gordon; (1969) Captain Cobwebb's Cowboys; Chatto & Windus, ISBN 0-701-10260-8; Armada, ISBN 0-006-91127-7
- Boshell, Gordon; (1971) Captain Cobwebb's Cobra; Chatto & Windus, ISBN 0-701-10466-X; Armada, ISBN 0-006-91125-0
- Boshell, Gordon; (1972) The Plot Against Buster the Dog
- Boshell, Gordon; (1973) Captain Cobwebb's Adventurers; Macdonald, ISBN 0-356-04304-5; Armada, ISBN 0-006-91110-2
- Boshell, Gordon; (1974) Captain Cobwebb and the Red Transistor; Macdonald & Jane's, ISBN 0-356-04719-9; Armada, ISBN 0-006-91383-0
- Boshell, Gordon; (1974) The Black Mercedes; Tandem Publishing. ISBN 0-426-11391-8
- Boshell, Gordon; (1975) The Million Pound Ransom; UK Bailey Brothers & Swindon. ISBN 978-0-561-00212-5
- Boshell, Gordon; (1975) Captain Cobwebb and the Crustaks; Macdonald & Jane's, ISBN 0-356-08136-2
- Boshell, Gordon; (1975) The Boy from Black Marsh
- Boshell, Gordon; (1976) Captain Cobwebb and The Chinese Unicorn; Macdonald & Jane's, ISBN 0-356-08376-4
- Boshell, Gordon; (1976) The Mendip Money Makers; Target; ISBN 978-0-426-11746-9
- Boshell, Gordon; (1977) Captain Cobwebb and the Mischief Man; Macdonald & Jane's, ISBN 0-354-08009-1
- Boshell, Gordon; (1978) Captain Cobwebb and the Quogs; Macdonald & Jane's, ISBN 0-354-08036-9
- Boshell, Gordon; (1979) Captain Cobwebb and The Magic Drops; Macdonald & Jane's, ISBN 0-354-08049-0
- Boshell, Gordon; (1980) Captain Cobwebb and the Amazing Cloud; Macdonald & Jane's, ISBN 0-354-08077-6
