= Meredith and Co. =

- First edition, 1933
- Author: George Mills
- Illustrator: C. E. Brock
- Language: English
- Genre: School story
- Publisher: Oxford University Press
- Publication date: 1933
- Publication place: United Kingdom
- Media type: Print
- Followed by: King Willow

Meredith and Co. is a classic children's novel with a school setting by George Mills. It was first published in 1933. Meredith and Co. and its sequel, King Willow (1938), were popular from their initial publications, through at least one reprinting in the late 1950s.

== Plot summary ==
The novel follows the adventures of Meredith (Muggs), a Sixth Form prefect at fictional Leadham House Preparatory School in England, and the adventures he has with his friends Hawk, Pongo, Clayton, Pigface, Renton, and Murray as well as a ubiquitous and beloved bulldog named Uggles.

== Publishing history ==
The text was originally published in 1933 by Oxford University Press, London, and was illustrated with plates by C. E. Brock. It was reprinted by the same publishing house in 1950 with new illustrations signed "D. White".

Meredith and Co. was reprinted by Andrew Dakers, Ltd., London, and printed in Czechoslovakia. The undated text is circa 1957. Its new illustrations updated the look of the characters to the post-war period of the United Kingdom, and were done by an illustrator who signed his work "Vernon".

== Reception ==
According to Dr. Thomas Houston of Windlesham House School, Brighton, Meredith and Co. was exceptional as it "captured the idiom of pupils during the interwar period more accurately than any other novel."
