= Dorita Fairlie Bruce =

Scottish author of girls' school stories

- Born: 20 May 1885; Palos, Spain
- Died: 21 September 1970 (aged 85); Upper Skelmorlie, North Ayrshire, Scotland
- Other name: Dorothy Morris Fairlie Bruce
- Occupation: Novelist
- Years active: 1905 – 1961
- Known for: School series which followed their protagonists through the years
- Notable work: The Dimsie series of books

Dorita Fairlie Bruce (20 May 1885 – 21 September 1970) was a Scottish children's author who wrote the popular Dimsie series of books published between 1921 and 1941. Her books were second in popularity only to Angela Brazil's during the 1920s and 1930s. The Dimsie books alone had sold half a million hardback copies by 1947.

== Early life ==
Dorita Fairlie Bruce, was born as Dorothy Morris Fairlie Bruce, in Palos, Heulva, Spain, on 20 May 1885, to Alexander Fairlie Bruce MICE (7 September 1857 – 20 January 1944), a Scottish civil engineer, and Katherine (Kate) Elizabeth Fairbairn (c.1861 – 1931), the daughter of William Freebairn of Drummilling, West Kilbride, Ayreshire. Alexander was working on the Heulva waterworks in Spain at the time. The early years in Spain resulted in Dorothy being known as "Dorita". (Note: The Spanish equivalent of Dorothy is Dorotea, and Dorita is a diminutive form of the name, or of any female name starting with Dor.)

Bruce's early childhood was spent in Scotland, first at Blanefield among the Campsie Hills, Stirling, an area that was to feature in many of her early stories, and then at Blairgowrie, Perthshire, where her brother Alan Cathcart Fairlie Bruce (2 March 1894 – 10 October 1927) (Note: Alan joined the Royal Navy as a Midshipman on 1 January 1915. He retired from active service on 25 November 1921 and applied for a Master's Cert from the Board of Trade on 1 December 1922. The certificate was issued in 1923, and he got permission to travel to Colombo, Sri Lanka, (Note: As a reserve officer, he needed formal permission to leave the UK.) to take up an appointment under the colonial office. He died in the Fraser Nursing home in Colombo on 10 October 1927, following an operation.) her only sibling, was born. In 1895 her father got the contract to build the Staines Reservoirs, next to what is now Heathrow Airport and the family moved south to Ealing in west London.

After moving to London Bruce was sent to a boarding school at Clarence House in Roehampton, the model for Dimsie's school, the 'Jane Willard Foundation'. Many of her holidays were spent with relations in Scotland, particularly the Firth of Clyde area around Largs in Ayrshire, which was later to become her particular literary landscape. Her mother's family lived in West Kilbride, a few miles south of Largs. (Note: The text on this archived website is largely based on Eva M. Löfgren's PhD Thesis at Stockholm University, 1993 – published as: Löfgren, Eva Margareta. "'Schoolmates of the long-ago': motifs and archetypes in Dorita Fairlie Bruce's boarding school stories", Stockholm: Symposion Graduale, 1993, (Diss., Stockholm University) (Skrifter utgivna av Svenska barnboksinstitutet. No 47) ISBN 91-7139-141-X)

At the time of the 1901 census, the family were living at 28 Inglis Road in Ealing. By the 1911 census the family have moved to 27 Boileau Road in Ealing, which was to remain the family home until at least 1944 when Bruce's father died there.

Bruce's paternal grandmother, Roberta Cadell, was a daughter of Robert Cadell, Sir Walter Scott's publisher, who is mentioned briefly in her historical novel, A Laverock Lilting. The Cadell family genealogy is available online.

Apart from her writing, Bruce seems to have led a life similar to that of many other unmarried middle-class women of her time, devoted to family duties and voluntary work. She looked after her invalid mother and later her ageing father, and helped to bring up her brother's three children after his early death. For more than 30 years, from about 1916 to the late 40s, she was engaged in the Girls' Guildry. This was a uniformed girls' organisation founded in 1900 by Dr William Francis Somerville and originally associated with the Church of Scotland, but later spread over other parts of Britain and the Empire. (Note: In 1939, The Girls' Guildry had about 24,000 members spread over 475 companies, with 338 in Scotland, 131 in England, and 3 each in Wales and Northern Ireland.) She was for a period in the 30s President of its West London Centre. She contributed factual articles to the Lamp of the Girls' Guildry magazine and Girls' Guildry plays a role in her Nancy series and gets a mention in her Dimsie series. In July 1965 The Girls' Guildry merged the Girls' Life Brigade Service of England and the Girls Brigade of Ireland to become the Girls' Brigade.

Bruce was above all, in spite of all her years in London, a Scottish writer. She often went back to Scotland for holidays, as witnessed by the detailed descriptions of the landscape in her many books set there. Not until 1949 was she free to move back to Scotland, to the big house she had bought in Upper Skelmorlie in the northern part of Ayrshire. In this house with its marvellous view of the Firth of Clyde, and named 'Triffeny' after one of her own books, she spent the last 21 years of her life, dying there aged 85 on 21 September 1970.

== Writing ==
Like so many other writers she started writing at an early age and is said to have won a competition for poetry at the age of six. The first time she used her pen name 'Dorita' was in small hand-written magazines. After leaving school she wrote a great number of poems and short stories in various genres for juvenile periodicals and anthologies from about 1905. Most of her short stories are set in Scotland, like the 'Regiment' stories, about two children and their pets living with their grandmother in the Campsie Hills. This is also partly the setting of the long historical romance "Greenmantle" (The Girl's Realm, 1914–15).

Her first known school story, "The Rounders Match" (The Girl's Realm, 1909) is set in a school, 'St. Hilary's', vaguely reminiscent of Clarence House. The three early 'Jane's' short stories ("The Jane-Willard Election" (1911), "The Terra-Cotta Coat", "For Mona's Sake", 1911–18) – set before the arrival of Dimsie herself – would eventually lead up to her first novel, The Senior Prefect (1921), later renamed Dimsie Goes to School.

She was a pioneer in creating series of books which followed a group of girls throughout their schooldays and even beyond. Her Dimsie, Nancy and Springdale series all follow this pattern, which was widely imitated.

The Colmskirk sequence, a set of nine novels for young adults, widened her scope, dealing with a group of families in the Scottish countryside around Largs from the seventeenth century to the twentieth.

== Books and series ==
The following lists of books are based on a search on the Jisc Library Hub Discover. (Note: The Jisc Library Hub Discover brings together the catalogues of 165 major UK and Irish libraries. Additional libraries are being added all the time, and the catalogue collates national, university, and research libraries.) supported by other sources (as indicated) including Sims and Clare, D. L Kirkpatrick, R. Kirkpatrick, and Abe Books. The reading order shown for each series (in the Ord. column of the tables) is taken from Sim and Clare.

One feature of the different series, other than the Sally series, is that characters from one series appear in other series. Dimsie and her friends appear in the Springdale books, while Anne and Primula are the principal characters in Dimsie Carries On. They also appear briefly in Nancy at St. Bride's. One girl from Maudsley is mentioned in Dimsie Intervenes, and another is a principal character in Toby at Tibbs Cross. Characters from the Dimsie series reappear in The School on the Moor. Lastly we meet Primula Mary in the last Colmskirk book, The Bartle Bequest, as if Colmskirk were not another incarnation of the Redchurch of her own school.

=== Dimsie ===
Bruce's best known books are the nine 'Dimsie' books (1921–41), seven of them set in the 'Jane Willard Foundation' ('Jane's') in Kent, the other two in Dimsie's family home, 'Twinkle Tap' on 'Loch Shee' (Gael. 'Loch of the Fairies') in Argyll. Any exact site has never been identified. Jane's is situated on the Kentish coast, most likely at St. Margaret's Bay, but the buildings are clearly modelled on Bruce's own old school, Clarence House. The school stories follow Dimsie (Daphne Isabel Maitland) from 10 year old Junior to popular head girl. The Dimsie books are famous for the 'Anti-Soppists', a group of six girls acting for the good of the school.

Two of the Dimsie books, Dimsie Intervenes (1936), and the final book Dimsie Carries on (1941) were written in response to readers' requests and letters.

In the last book, Dimsie Carries on (1941), set during WW2, she is married to Dr Peter Gilmour, has two children and makes medicines from her own herb garden. The books were not published in the correct reading order. The Dimsie books were very popular. Half-a-million Dimsie books had been sold by 1947.

The twelfth book listed below, Dimsie Takes Charge, is outside the series and was a collection of all of the short stories featuring Dimsie and the Jane Willard Foundation that had appeared in annuals and story books, published to celebrate the centenary of Bruce's birth. The same collection was published in 2011 as Dimsie and the Jane Willard Foundation. (ISBN 9781847451064) by Girls Gone By Publishers with the original texts.

Books by Dorita Fairlie Bruce in the Dimsie series
Ser.	Year	Title	Illustrator	Location	Publisher	p.	Ord.	Note
1	1920	The Senior Prefect AKA Dimsie goes to school	Walter Paget	London	OUP	270 p. ill., 8º	1	(Note: Originally published as "The Senior Prefect", and then republished as Dimsie goes to School.)
2	1921	Dimsie Moves Up	Walter Paget	London	OUP	254 p. ill., 8º	2	(Note: Jisc suggests illustrations were by Margaret Holder, but Cadogan, Kirkpatrick, and the press give the illustrator as Wal Paget.)
3	1922	Dimsie Moves Up Again, etc	Gertrude Demain Hammond	London	OUP	288 p., 8º	3	(Note: Jisc suggests illustrations were by Margaret Holder, but Cadogan, and Sims and Clare, gives the illustrator as Gertrude D. Hammond.)
4	1923	Dimsie among the Prefects, etc	Gertrude Demain Hammond	London	OUP	288 p., 8º	4	(Note: Illustrator credit from Sims and Clare.)
5	1924	Dimsie Grows Up, etc	Henry Coller	London	OUP	288 p., 8º	7	(Note: An adult sequel)
6	1925	Dimsie, Head-Girl, etc	Mary Strange Reeve	London	OUP	280 p., 8º	5	
7	1927	Dimsie Goes Back, etc	Mary Strange Reeve	London	OUP	viii, 277 p., 8º	8	
8	1932	The Dimsie Omnibus		London	OUP	3 parts, 8º		(Note: This omnibus contains Dimsie Goes to School, Dimsie Moves Up, and Dimsie Moves Up Again.)
9	1933	The New Dimsie Omnibus		London	OUP	3 parts, 8º		(Note: This omnibus contains Dimsie Among the Prefects, Dimsie Head Girl, and Dimsie Grows Up.)
10	1937	Dimsie Intervenes	M. D. Johnson	London	OUP	286 p., 8º	6	(Note: Illustrator credit and publisher from Sims and Clare)
11	1942	Dimsie carries on	W. Bryce Hamilton	London	OUP	254 p. ill., 8º	9	
12	1985	Dimsie Takes Charge		Wendover	Goodchild	224 p., 8º	10	(Note: Collected Dimsie stories from annuals. Reissued as Dimsie and the Jane Willard Foundation by Girls Gone By in 2011.)

=== The St. Bride's and Maudsley (Nancy) series ===
Her second series of school stories may be seen as two different series connected by the character of Nancy Caird. The three 'St. Bride's' books are set in an island in the 'Hebrides', more or less identical with Great Cumbrae opposite Largs. The first book, The Girls of St. Bride's (1923), actually takes place a few years before the arrival of Nancy. The five 'Maudsley' books, on the other hand, are set in a day school in a town in southern England, probably based on Farnham in Surrey, where Nancy spends a few years between her two sojourns at St. Bride's. The Maudsley books are probably the most significant manifestations of the Girls' Guildry in girls' fiction. The last Nancy book, Nancy Calls the Tune (1944) is another 'adult' sequel, about life in a small town in Scotland, probably Crieff in Perth, during the War.

Books by Dorita Fairlie Bruce in the St. Bride's and Maudsley (Nancy) series
Ser.	Year	Title	Illustrator	Location	Publisher	p.	Ord.	Note
1	1923	The Girls of St. Bride's, etc	Henry Coller	London	OUP	288 p., 8º	1	
2	1925	That Boarding School Girl	Roy	London	OUP	160 p., 8º	3	
3	1926	The New Girl and Nancy, etc	Mary Strange Reeve	London	OUP	288 p., 8º	4	
4	1927	Nancy to the Rescue		London	OUP	159 p., 8º	5	
5	1931	The best bat in the school	D. Osborne	London	OUP	95 p., 8º	6	(Note: Publisher and page count from Abe Books.)
6	1933	Nancy at St Bride's	M. D. Johnson	London	OUP	288 p., 8º	2	
7	1935	Nancy in the Sixth	M. D. Johnson	London	OUP	288 p., 8º	7	
8	1937	The Dorita Bruce Omnibus		London	OUP	3 parts, 8º		(Note: This omnibus contains Nancy at St. Bride's, That Boarding-School Girl, and The New Girl and Nancy.)
9	1938	Nancy Returns to St. Bride's, etc	M. D. Johnson	London	OUP	288 p., 8º	8	
10	1944	Nancy calls the Tune	Margaret Horder	London	OUP	192 p., 8º	9	

=== The Springdale series ===
The six 'Springdale' books are Bruce's most Scottish school stories, set in the little seaside resort 'Redchurch', without a doubt modelled on Largs. But Springdale is a far larger school than 'Jane's', a more typical English public school with five, later six, different houses and a more complex prefect system. These books follow the little group of friends around Anne Willoughby and Primula Mary Beton through their schooldays, from new juniors to prefects. Anne's elder sister Peggy and some of her contemporaries are among the principal characters in the first three books.

Books by Dorita Fairlie Bruce in the Springdale series
Ser.	Year	Title	Illustrator	Location	Publisher	p.	Ord.	Note
1	1928	The New House-Captain, etc	Mary Strange Reeve	London	OUP	288 p., 8º	1	(Note: Illustrator credit from Abe Books.)
2	1930	The Best House in the School, etc	Mary Strange Reeve	London	OUP	287 p., 8º	2	
3	1932	Captain of Springdale, etc	Henry Coller	London	OUP	288 p., 8º	3	
4	1934	The new house at Springdale	M. D. Johnson	London	OUP	288 p., 8º	4	
5	1935	The Springdale Omnibus		London	OUP	3 parts, 8º		(Note: The omnibus contains The New House-Captain, The Best House in the School, and Captain of Springdale.)
6	1936	Prefects at Springdale, etc	M. D. Johnson	London	OUP	288 p., 8º	5	
7	1939	Captain Anne, etc		London	OUP	288 p., 8º	6	

=== The Toby and Sally series ===
Her last two sets of school stories are shorter, the 'Toby' books set in two very different schools, The School on the Moor on Dartmoor, and The School in the Wood in the New Forest respectively, with another 'War' sequel, Toby at Tibbs Cross.

Books by Dorita Fairlie Bruce in the Toby series
Ser.	Year	Title	Illustrator	Location	Publisher	p.	Ord.	Note
16	1931	The School on the Moor	Mary Strange Reeve	London	OUP	285 p., 8º	1	
26	1940	The School in the Woods	G. M. Anson	London	OUP	256 p., 8º	2	(Note: Illustrator detail from Abe Books)
28	1943	Toby at Tibbs Cross	Margaret Horder	London	OUP	192 p., 8º	3	

The three 'Sally' books, her very last books, turn back to Scotland, but their plots and themes are somewhat different from those of her earlier school stories. What make this series different from the other school series is that the characters are unique. All Bruce's series of books, except the Sally books, are more or less interconnected. It has been suggested that indicates that Bruce had a loyal readership who were familiar with the different series.

Books by Dorita Fairlie Bruce in the Sally series
Ser.	Year	Title	Illustrator	Location	Publisher	p.	Ord.	Note
1	1956	Sally Scatterbrain	Betty Ladler	London	Blackie & Son	253 p., 8º	1	(Note: The Sally series of stories are the only school stories that are not tied into the other series through common characters, locations etc.)
2	1959	Sally Again	Betty Ladler	London	Blackie & Son	238 p., 8º	2	
3	1961	Sally's Summer Term	Joan Thompson	London	Blackie & Son	224 p., 8º	3	(Note: Ray says that Sally's Summer Term was very much poorer than her earlier work. Bruce was 76 when it was published.)

=== The Colmskirk series ===
The 'Colmskirk' series is different from her school stories, nine young adult novels about a group of families living in and around Largs ('Colmskirk') and West Kilbride ('Kirkarlie') from the 17th C to post WW2 time. The first four of them are historical. This is probably the kind of novels Sylvia Drummond is supposed to write in the later Dimsie books, and Bruce evidently wanted to consider these books her more 'serious' works. They are full of references both to the history and church history of Scotland and to local traditions.

Ser.	Year	Title	Illustrator	Location	Publisher	p.	Ord.	Note
1	1930	The King's Curate		London	John Murray	316 p, 8º	1	
2	1932	Mistress Mariner		London	John Murray	365 p., 8º	2	
3	1945	A Laverock Lilting	Margaret Horder	London	OUP	190 p., 8vo.	3	(Note: Illustrator credit and page count from Abe Books.)
4	1945	Wild Goose Quest		London	Lutterworth Press	256 p., 8º	5	(Note: Publisher credit from Abe Books.)
5	1947	The Serendipity Shop	Margaret Horder	London	OUP	205 p., 8º	6	
6	1950	Triffeny	Margaret Horder	London	OUP	viii, 275 p.	6	(Note: Triffeny was the name of Bruce's house on Wemyss Bay, where she spend the last twenty-one years of her life.)
7	1952	The Bees on Drumwhinnie	Margaret Horder	London	OUP	273 p., 8º	4	(Note: Fantastic Fiction gives the publication date as 1932, but Abe Books and Jisc list it as being first published in 1952.)
8	1953	The Debatable Mound	Patricia M. Lambe	London	OUP	vii, 232 p., 8º	8	
9	1955	The Bartle Bequest	Sylvia Green	London	OUP	vii, 253 p., 8º	9	

=== Stories ===
- Erica the Ever-right in The Great Book of School Stories for Girls, Mrs Herbert Strang (ed.), (c.1930s), Humphrey Milford, OUP
- The School For Scandal in The Big Book Of School Stories For Girls, Mrs Herbert Strang (ed.), (1931), Humphrey Milford
- The Influence Of Anne in The Big Book For Girls, Mrs Herbert Strang (ed.), (1925), Humphrey Milford
- Captain Betsy in Happy Stories For Girls, (c. 1930s), Humphrey Milford
- The Smugglers Of Portincross in The Great Book For Girls Mrs Herbert Strang (ed.), (c. 1930s), Humphrey Milford and The Big Book For Girls Mrs Herbert Strang (ed.), (1935), Humphrey Milford
- All Fools Day in The Big Book Of School Stories For Girls Mrs Herbert Strang (ed.), (1930), Humphrey Milford
- The Monster of Loch Shee in The Oxford Annual For Girls Oxford University Press (1934)

== Locations used in Bruce's books ==
=== Clarence House – Jane Willard Foundation ===
The buildings and grounds of Jane's were modelled on Bruce's old school in South West London, on Priory Lane, south of Upper Richmond Rd (SW15).

Clarence House (Note: Not to be confused with Clarence House, the British royal residence on The Mall in the City of Westminster, London.) was originally built c. 1730 and for a time owned by the Duke of Clarence, later William IV. The buildings were used as a girls' school from 1867 to about 1919, as a junior school for the Royal School for Daughters of Military Officers until 1885. The grounds were bought by the Bank of England and were for many years part of their sports grounds. The buildings were demolished in 1934.

The site of Clarence House is now wholly changed and occupied by the new National Tennis Centre opened by the Lawn Tennis Association in 2007.

=== St. Margaret's Bay – St Elstrith's Bay ===
6 km W of Dover, is the most likely site for 'St. Elstrith's Bay'.

This used to be a popular seaside resort from the early 19th century to WW2, when most of the buildings in the Bay itself were destroyed. The Bay is now also more shallow after erosion of flanking cliffs, but wooden flights of stairs still climb the cliff from the beach, which is still good for swimming. There are caves visible in the white cliff, memories of their smuggling past. Many ships have been stranded here during the centuries, so the wreck featured in the Dimsie books is certainly realistic.

The upper village, St Margaret's at Cliffe, with its Norman church, was still fairly old-fashioned in the 1980s. South Sands Lodge is the most likely model for 'St. Elstrith Lodge', and you may still see South Forland Lighthouse, the 'old lighthouse' of the Dimsie books.

=== Largs and the Firth of Clyde Area ===
Largs and the Firth of Clyde Area is the central landscape in Bruce's work - the scene of nearly half her books. Ayrshire is known as 'Brigshire' in the Springdale books. Largs itself is a seaside resort with a view of the Firth of Clyde, The Cumbrae Islands, and, in fine weather, the distant peaks of Arran. This is the 'Redchurch' of the Springdale and St. Bride's books, and the 'Colmskirk' of the Colmskirk novels, both names derived from the parish church, St. Columba's, built in 1892 by red sandstone and a landmark with its lofty spire.

A visitor may follow the Springdale or Colmskirk characters along the streets of Largs and its surroundings. Four of the 'Springdale' houses still lie along Greenock Rd, just N of the church, though what must have been the 'Rowans' is now mostly hidden behind Nardini's Restaurant.

== Assessment ==
The Dundee Courier called Bruce "a writer who makes girlhood real in a delightful way." Bruce was one of the Big Four of girls' school fiction, together with Angela Brazil, Elsie Oxenham, and Elinor Brent-Dyer. Auchmuty calls Bruce one of the Big Three, and excludes Angela Brazil. Auchmurty notes that all of the big three dedicated books to each other, (Note: The other major author of Girls' School Stories was Enid Blyton, but she only started producing them in the 1940s and early 1950s. Auchmuty's A World of Girls (1992) adds Blyton to the big three as the fourth author she reviews.) and these authors were very successful commercially between the wars.

Clare notes that the interest of Bruce's school stories "depends chiefly not on romantic settings or exciting incidents (although both occur) but on the interplay of characters and the resolution of personal dilemmas within the limits of a small, clearly defined community." Lofgren makes the same point, stating that "Bruce's school stories are more concentrated on the intrinsic themes offered by the (boarding) school as a small society of girls, than those by many other writers."

Lofgren and Clare both praise Bruce's plotting. "Her plots are tightly constructed and her school backgrounds very real" "Her plots are skilfully built around the relations between schoolgirls of the same or different ages: friendship, rivalry and conflicts. . . 'Outside' adventures and mysteries are normally well incorporated in the central plot . . ."

Sims and Clare state that Bruce "was perhaps the most skilful exponent of the traditional girls’ school story of the 20s and 30s, with plots deftly exploring the narrative potential of the schoolgirl community, in particular relationships between girls of different age groups and conflicts between friendship and rivalry. Even the elements of mystery and adventure are wholly integrated into the plots." Cadogan, in comparing Bruce with Angela Brazil states that "Bruce's plots and characterizations have a subtlety and an uncontrived exuberance that are lacking in many of Brazil's stories" Clare states that the overall quality of Bruce's books is higher than those of Oxenham or Brent-Dyer.

Cadogan calls Bruce's Dimsie, Nancy and Springdale series her most memorable books. Sneddon says that these three series "include some of the best girls' school stories ever written."

== Availability ==
Unlike her near contemporary Elinor Brent-Dyer, Bruce was not republished in paperback editions. The new editions of the Dimsie books in the 1980s, including a collection of short stories, are heavily updated, removing the books from their original period.

Attractive, unabridged, paperback editions of some of Bruce's books were published by Girls Gone By Publishers, but these are now (September 2020) out of print, and are only available from second-hand booksellers. The Girls Gone By editions have well researched introductions and original illustrations and cover art.
