= Herbert Strang =

English writer of adventure stories for boys, joint pseudonym of duo

Herbert Strang was the pseudonym of two English authors, George Herbert Ely (1866–1958) and Charles James L'Estrange (1867–1947). They specialized in writing adventure stories for boys, both historical and modern-day.

Both men were staff members of Oxford University Press, which published their books, giving them a patina of social status and approval for the parents of their intended readership. Their work showed a broad general debt to that of Jules Verne; Round the World in Seven Days was one of their most popular books. Ely and L'Estrange have been classified as "popular writers of imperial fiction" and "successors of G. A. Henty".

The pseudonym was also employed for several series of anthologies, works "edited by Herbert Strang" that included The Big Book of School Stories for Boys and The Oxford Annual for Scouts. There was in addition an anthology series for girls by "Mrs Herbert Strang", who was also given as the author of some adventure books for girls, notably The Girl Crusoes, a robinsonade.

== Selected works by "Herbert Strang" ==
- Kobo: A Story of the Russo-Japanese War (1905)
- Brown of Moukden: A Story of the Russo-Japanese War (1906)
- One of Clive's Heroes (1906)
- Samba (1906) – reprinted in US as Fighting on the Congo (1907)
- On the Trail of the Arabs (1907)
- Rob the Ranger (1907)
- King of the Air (1908)
- With Drake on the Spanish Main (1908)
- Barclay of the Guides (1909)
- Humphrey Bold (1909)
- In the New Forest: A Story of the reign of William the Conqueror (with John Aston) (1910)
- Round the World in Seven Days (1910)
- Swift and Sure (1910)
- The Cruise of the Gyro-car (1911)
- The Air Scout (1912)
- The Flying Boat (1912)
- The Motor Scout (1913)
- The Air Patrol: A Story of the North-West Frontier (1913)
- A Gentleman-At-Arms (1914)
- A Hero of Liege (1915)
- Fighting with French (1915)
- The Old Man of the Mountain (1916)
- Burton the Flying Corps (1916)
- Little Stories of Great Lives (1916)
- Tom Willoughby's Scouts (1919)
- Bright Ideas (1920)
- The Blue Raider (1920)
- No Man's Island (1921)
- Winning his Name (1922)
- A Thousand Miles an Hour (1928)
- The River Pirates (1931)
- The Crimson Book for Boys (publication date not stated but c. 1916-1918)

== Little Stories of Great Lives ==
The series Little Stories of Great Lives was edited by Herbert Strang and written for young children. The books are printed with large type and wide margins on good paper. The cover of each book contains a coloured portrait of the subject, and there are numerous black-and-white illustrations inside. The stories in the series include:

- Stories of Famous Women, by Margaret Stuart Lane.
- The Story of Hans Andersen, by E. Hallam Moorhouse.
- The Story of Francis Drake, by H. Russell Ford.
- The Story of Joan of Arc, by Evelyn Ward.
- The Story of Lord Kitchener, by Arthur O. Cooke.
- The Story of Lord Roberts, by Arthur O. Cooke.
- The Story of Napoleon, by Arthur O. Cooke.
- The Story of Nelson, by Arthur O. Cooke.
- The Story of Robert the Bruce, by Lewis Spence.
- The Story of William Wallace, by Lewis Spence.
