= Dimsie Goes to School =

Novel by Dorita Fairlie Bruce

Dimsie Goes To School
- 1929 Oxford University Press Hardcover Edition
- Author: Dorita Fairlie Bruce
- Illustrator: Wal Paget
- Language: English
- Series: Dimsie
- Genre: Children's novel
- Publisher: Oxford University Press
- Publication date: 1921
- Publication place: United Kingdom
- Media type: Print (Hardcover)
- Pages: 277 pp
- Followed by: Dimsie Moves Up

Dimsie Goes To School is the first of the Dimsie books by author Dorita Fairlie Bruce. It was first published in 1921 under the title The Senior Prefect and changed in 1925 to Dimsie Goes To School. The book was illustrated by Wal Paget.

The protagonist of the book is ten-year-old Daphne Isabel Maitland, who is nicknamed Dimsie, on account of her initials. The book begins with Dimsie travelling in a train and about to start school at the Jane Willard Foundation, where her older cousin (also Daphne) is a prefect.

The popularity of the continuing series led to Dimsie Goes to School being reprinted several more times by the OUP, and in the 1950s by Spring Books. The illustrations kept pace with changing fashions, as the following two illustrations of the same scene demonstrate. In the 1983 edition from John Goodchild Publishers the text was "unfortunately radically modernised".

Frontispiece, by Wal Paget, from the 1925 Oxford University Press edition

Cover of a late 1950s Spring Books edition

== Critical reception ==
Dimsie Goes to School is included in The Guardian's 2009 list, "A book lover's guide to building a brilliant children's library".
