= The Sword in the Stone (novel) =

1938 novel by T. H. White

The Once and Future King Book 1: The Sword in the Stone
- First edition
- Author: T. H. White
- Original title: Story of Arthur and The Sword in the Stone
- Illustrator: Robert Lawson
- Language: English
- Series: The Once and Future King
- Genre: Fantasy, Arthurian Legend
- Published: 1938 Collins
- Publication place: United Kingdom
- Media type: Print (hardback and paperback)
- Pages: 312
- Followed by: The Queen of Air and Darkness

The Sword in the Stone is a 1938 novel by British writer T. H. White. First published by Collins in the United Kingdom as a stand-alone work, it later became the first part of a tetralogy, The Once and Future King. A fantasy of the boyhood of King Arthur, it combines elements of legend, history, fantasy, and comedy. Walt Disney adapted the story to an animated film, and the BBC adapted it to radio.

Time included the novel in its list of the 100 Best Young-Adult Books of All Time. In 2014, The Sword in the Stone was awarded a retrospective Hugo Award for Best Novel for 1939.

== Background ==
The premise is that Arthur's youth, not dealt with in Sir Thomas Malory's Le Morte d'Arthur (1485), was a time when he was tutored by Merlyn to prepare him for the use of power and royal life. Merlyn magically turns him into various animals at times, and he also has more human adventures. The setting is loosely based on Medieval England, and in places it incorporates White's considerable knowledge of medieval culture (e.g., hunting, falconry and jousting). However, it makes no attempt at consistent historical accuracy, and incorporates some obvious anachronisms.

== Plot of the Once and Future King version ==
Wart is an orphan boy being raised by Sir Ector in the Castle Sauvage surrounded by the Forest of the same name. Alongside Ector's son Kay, Wart is training as a knight, although he can only rise to be Kay's squire because he is of common birth. Chasing a tiercel goshawk that Kay had let get away during their falconry practice, Wart gets lost in the Forest Sauvage. He is shot at by an unseen bowman, and he encounters King Pellinore who is busy hunting the Questing Beast. Eventually, he meets the wizard Merlyn who is living backward in time, and frequently speaks of things that he has seen in the future.

Wart and Merlyn return to Ector's castle, and the wizard becomes the boys' tutor. He pays special attention to Wart. Merlyn turns him into a fish, and together they explore the castle's moat (and Wart learns about absolute monarchism). In one of their excursions, the boys and Merlyn encounter Little John, who leads them to Robin Hood (referred to as Robin Wood) and Marian. Their extended stay with Robin culminates in an encounter with a griffin. Kay manages to slay the beast, taking its head as a trophy. During the fray, a wyvern breaks Wart's collar bone.

While Wart is stuck in bed, Merlyn sends a spell through his bedroom keyhole to turn him into an ant. Wart crawls into the ant farms in his room and learns that ants think in binary terms of "Done" or "Not Done" (an allusion to totalitarian communism). After his clavicle heals, Merlyn later changes Wart into a badger, and then a wild goose that flies so high as to not be able to perceive national boundaries, a pacifist message. Wart is confused about why he is tasked with keeping watch while the other geese eat. He assumes that he is meant to look out for rival geese, but the very notion that geese would eat their own kind is offensive to them.

When Kay is ready to be knighted, Sir Ector and his retinue travel to London, where he owns some property. As Kay approaches the tournament field, he realizes that he has left his sword back at the inn. Wart is sent back to retrieve it, but finds the inn locked. He finds a sword stuck in an anvil atop a stone in a churchyard. When Wart touches the sword, his senses heighten. He is unable to pull it out, but as he tries again, the voices of all the animals and friends he has made give him encouragement and remind him of the lessons they taught him. On the third try, the sword comes loose, and Wart rushes to Kay with it.

When Kay learns that Wart pulled it from the anvil, he knows it is the sword that will determine Uther Pendragon's successor. He tells Sir Ector that he pulled it from the stone. However, when Ector asks him to replicate the feat, Kay admits that Wart was responsible. Wart is terrified when Sir Ector and Kay bow to him as their King.

After he is crowned, Wart is given gifts from all over the world and from his friends, both animal and human. Sir Ector sends him a dunce cap, which transforms into Merlyn. The wizard explains that Wart is Uther's son, and that his real name is Arthur.

== Revisions ==
The English Collins first edition was partially rewritten for Putnam in America.

The version appearing in 1958 in the tetralogy was substantially revised, partly to incorporate events and themes that White had originally intended to cover in a fifth volume (which was finally published after his death, as The Book of Merlyn). To this end, the revised version includes several new episodes, including the ant and goose episodes, but leaves out some of the episodes that had appeared in the original (e.g. Merlyn's battle with Madam Mim which appeared in the Disney film). Some critics considered the revised version to be inferior to the original. Publishers have tended to carry on using the original versions when they were published independently of the tetralogy.

== Adaptations ==
=== Film ===
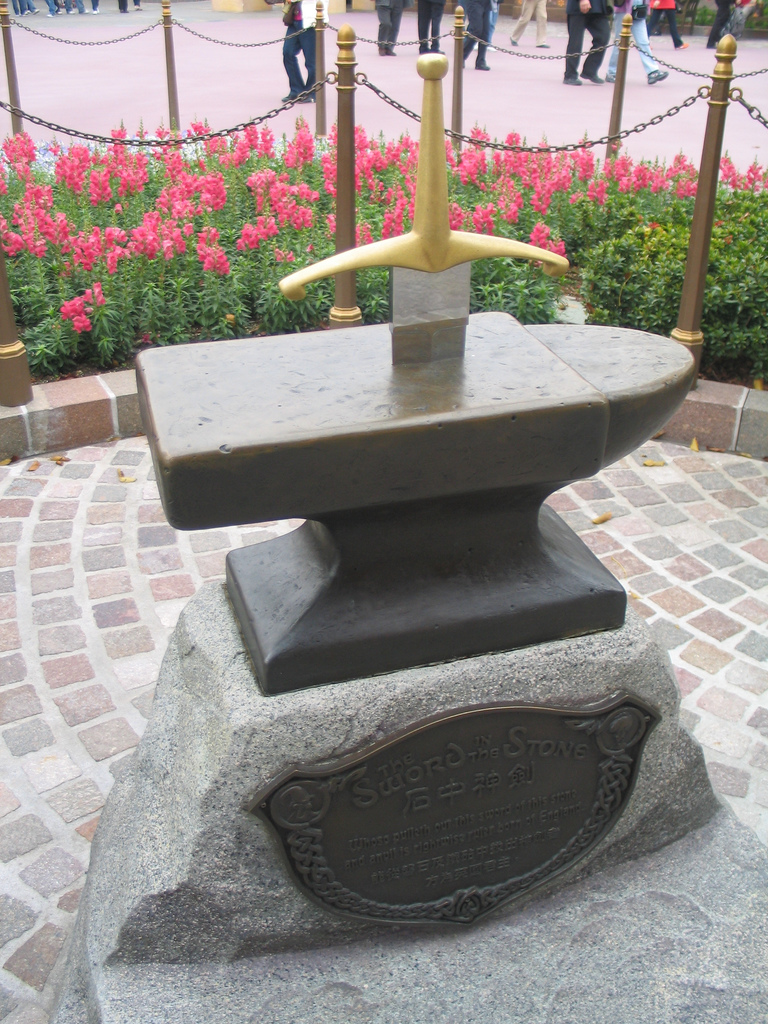
The Sword in the Stone, Hong Kong Disneyland

Walt Disney made an animated film adaptation of The Sword in the Stone, first released on 25 December 1963 by Buena Vista Distribution. Similar to many Disney films, it is based on the general plot of the original story, but much of the substance and depth of the story is considerably changed.

=== Radio dramatization ===
The BBC broadcast a six-part radio dramatisation in 1939, with incidental music by Benjamin Britten. A single surviving 25-minute episode, Wart and the Hawks, was, but is no longer available to stream online. It was revived in 1952, following re-discovery of Britten's score after it had been thought lost. A further BBC radio adaptation in 1982 starred Michael Hordern as Merlyn. (Hordern had already starred as another famous wizard, Gandalf, in the BBC's 1981 radio adaptation of The Lord of the Rings by J. R. R. Tolkien.)
