= The Queen of Air and Darkness =

Novel by T. H. White

- First edition
- Author: T. H. White
- Original title: The Witch in the Wood
- Language: English
- Series: The Once and Future King
- Genre: Fantasy
- Publisher: G. P. Putnam's Sons
- Publication date: 1939
- Publication place: United Kingdom
- Pages: 282 (first edition)
- Preceded by: The Sword in the Stone
- Followed by: The Ill-Made Knight

The Queen of Air and Darkness is a fantasy novel by English writer T. H. White. It is the second book in his series The Once and Future King. It continues the story of the newly crowned King Arthur, his tutelage by the wise Merlyn, his war against King Lot, and also introduces the Orkney clan, a group of characters who would cause the eventual downfall of the king.

The original second book in the series was titled The Witch in the Wood, published in 1939. The Queen of Air and Darkness has the same general outline as the replaced work, but is substantially shorter and most of the text is different.

== Plot ==
The Queen of Air and Darkness is the second book in the four-part work The Once and Future King, which chronicles White's own version of the legend of King Arthur. Although it is the shortest book in the series, it is a vital point in the story for several reasons:

- Arthur invents the idea of the Round Table, which is central to the plots of the third and fourth books.
- Arthur also defeats the barons rebelling against him, securing his position as king.
- Arthur's understanding of "Might vs. Right" is explored more deeply in this book.
- The Orkney faction is introduced. These four boys (Gawain, Agravaine, Gaheris, and Gareth) grow up and become major characters in the third and fourth books.
- King Pellinore gets married and has several children who will become important in The Ill-Made Knight.

The novel begins with the four Orkney boys, Gawaine, Agravaine, Gaheris, and Gareth, telling each other stories late at night. As they speak, it becomes clear that they have great respect and love for their mother, the beautiful Queen Morgause, although she does not devote herself entirely to motherhood, but has a desire to understand and unlock her magical powers while her husband, King Lot, is off to war against King Arthur. We also learn that Arthur's father, Uther Pendragon, raped Morgause's mother, Igraine, making Morgause Arthur's half-sister (although no one is yet aware of this fact except for Merlyn, who had forgotten to tell it to Arthur).

Arthur is still being tutored by Merlyn, although the relationship between the two has changed. Instead of seeing Merlyn as an almighty sage, Arthur treats him as more of a friend throughout the novel. Despite this, Merlyn still attempts to teach Arthur how to create a perfect society out of his newly formed kingdom. Arthur is unimpressed and would rather be off fighting wars than taking care of peasants.

Back in the Orkney Isles, the four Orkney boys are bored and seek a story from their own tutor, St Toirdelbach, a very different teacher from Merlyn. He tells them a story, but quickly becomes annoyed with the boys and threatens to hit them with his shillelagh if they refuse to leave him alone. This is one of White's best examples of how different the loveless childhoods of the Orkney boys are from the happy childhood of Arthur.

As the boys are walking on the beach after visiting St Toirdelbach, Sir Grummor Grummursum and King Pellinore arrive on the shore in a magic barge. Along with them is a Saracen knight named Sir Palomides, who has apparently befriended them between the previous book and their arrival in the Orkney islands. The trio had previously been in Flanders where Pellinore fell in love with the daughter of the Queen of Flanders. The knights had entered the boat and had been unable to turn it around, causing Pellinore to become so lovesick that he no longer wishes to hunt the Questing Beast, his lifelong passion.

Arthur is preparing for the battle against Lot's Gaelic warriors. He has begun to accept the idea of chivalry, and of "Might vs. Right". He announces to Merlyn that he plans to put down Lot's rebellion and then use his power to enforce justice throughout his kingdom.

Morgause is pleased that the three bumbling knights have landed because they have no idea that England is at war with Orkney. She takes advantage of their ignorance and attempts to make them fall in love with her. She attempts an unsuccessful unicorn hunt with the knights. The boys consult St Toirdelbach and then attempt to catch a live unicorn to present to their mother. They almost succeed but Agravaine kills the unicorn in a fit of rage (the boys were pretending that the virgin who lured the unicorn was their mother and Agravaine hated the unicorn for touching their "mother"). The other three brothers are angry, as they believe that Agravaine has ruined their chances of getting a reward from their mother. Only Gareth feels sorry for the unicorn. Morgause is not pleased that they succeeded where she failed and she has them whipped.

On the plains of Bedegraine Arthur is making final preparations for battle. He announces his idea of the Round Table and Merlyn informs him that another king has such a table. This king is the father of Arthur's future wife, Guenever. Sir Kay, Arthur's foster-brother, says that he believes that if war will help the conquered race to live a better life, they should be conquered. Merlyn angrily informs him that there is a certain Austrian who shares Kay's views, and "plunged the world into bloody chaos." This is an allusion to Adolf Hitler.

Sir Palomides and Sir Grummore, concerned about King Pellinore's lovesickness, plan to impersonate the Questing Beast and lure him back to chasing it. Their plan backfires when the real Questing Beast appears and chases them. They spend the night caught half-way up a cliff.

Morgause, frustrated that the knights have not fallen for her, decides that her boys matter more to her. Gareth rushes to the stables to tell his brothers that she loves them, and finds that Gawaine and Agravaine are having a heated argument. Agravaine wants to send a letter to Lot, informing him about the three knights and Morgause's plans to cheat on him. Gawaine is infuriated by the idea, considering it a betrayal of their mother. The argument ends when Agravaine threatens Gawaine with a hidden knife, and Gawaine nearly kills him. White explains that Gawaine cannot help his sudden passions, which will plague him throughout his life.

Merlyn knows that his time with Arthur is nearly over, as he will soon be locked up for a thousand years. Arthur is distressed and asks why Merlyn can't avoid the imprisonment that awaits him. Merlyn tells Arthur a parable to explain that no one can escape fate (the famous story of a man who learns of his death, then rides to escape death, but ends up running into Death while escaping). He also warns Arthur about Guenever and Lancelot, but Arthur is too saddened by Merlyn's departure to take the warning to heart.

Early the next morning King Pellinore is walking alone on the beach when he spots Palomides and Grummore stuck on the cliff, with the Questing Beast waiting for them below. He explains that the Beast has fallen in love with them, as she thinks that they are her mate when they are in disguise, and he refuses to slay the creature. Instead he holds it down while Grummore and Palomides escape to Morgause's castle. Pellinore is reunited with Piggy, the daughter of the Queen of Flanders. He returns to the castle to find that the Questing Beast is waiting outside. Merlyn has begun his journey to find Nimue and passes by them. He advises the pair of knights to psychoanalyse the Questing Beast. They do so, but it backfires and the Questing Beast falls in love with Sir Palomides. Pellinore gives up chasing the Beast then and Sir Palomides takes over from him.

Arthur has engaged Lot in a battle that will determine who will rule Britain. Arthur overcomes Lot with an ambush at night, despite Lot's having a larger number of soldiers. Contrary to the code of chivalry (or at least White's version of it) he also attacks the enemy knights first rather than the foot soldiers. Arthur realises that it is wrong to slaughter peasants for the fun of knights, as Merlyn had insisted in his lessons. Assisted by the French noblemen, Ban and Bors, Arthur wins the battle.

The defeated Lot returns home and the three English knights are shocked to learn that Orkney has been at war with England. Morgause heads south to England in order to reconcile with the English, and brings with her her sons and the three knights. Arthur conducts the wedding of Piggy and Pellinore, whom he remembers fondly as the first knight he ever met. At the same time, St Toirdelbach also marries. After the ceremony Morgause seduces Arthur and becomes pregnant. It is then that Merlyn, far away in North Humberland, remembers that he had forgotten to tell Arthur that Morgause was Arthur's half-sister, so Arthur's adultery is also incest. Morgause becomes pregnant with Mordred, who will one day come to ruin his father's kingdom.

== Title ==
The title comes from a poem by A. E. Housman. It refers to Morgause, Witch-Queen of the Orkney Islands. She has four sons but does not care for them, and prefers her magic.

== The Witch in the Wood ==
The Queen of Air and Darkness is a substantially different book from The Witch in the Wood, and less than half its length. The general outline is similar, but the tone is darker and more violent and many of the details are different; Sir Palomides is the tutor to the boys, for example, and the satire of Queen Morgause is longer and less comical.

== See also ==
- The Sword in the Stone
- The Ill-Made Knight
