= The Ill-Made Knight =

Novel by T. H. White

- First edition
- Author: T. H. White
- Language: English
- Series: The Once and Future King
- Genre: Fantasy
- Publisher: G. P. Putnam's Sons
- Publication date: 1940
- Publication place: United Kingdom
- Pages: 291
- Preceded by: The Queen of Air and Darkness
- Followed by: The Candle in the Wind

The Ill-Made Knight is a fantasy novel by British writer T. H. White, the third book in the series The Once and Future King. It was first published in 1940 by G. P. Putnam's Sons.

Much of The Ill-Made Knight takes place mainly in King Arthur's Camelot, and tells of the adventures, perils and mistakes of Sir Lancelot. T.H. White's version of the tale elaborates on the passionate love of Lancelot and Queen Guinevere. Suspense is provided by the tension between Lancelot's friendship for Arthur and his love affair with the queen. This affair leads inevitably to the breaking of the Round Table and sets up the tragedy that is to follow in the concluding book of the tetralogy, The Candle in the Wind.

== Plot summary ==
Despite being the bravest of knights of the Round Table, Lancelot is ugly and ape-like, and calls himself the Chevalier mal fet, "The Ill-Made Knight". As a boy Lancelot loved King Arthur and trained to be a knight of the Round Table. When he arrives and becomes one of Arthur's knights he also becomes the king's close friend. This causes some tension, as he is jealous of Arthur's new wife, Guinevere. In order to please her husband, Guinevere tries to befriend Lancelot and the two eventually fall in love.

Lancelot leaves Camelot to aid people in need. Along the way he meets a woman who begs him to climb a tree and rescue her husband's escaped falcon. After he removes his armour and does so the husband appears and reveals that he wanted Lancelot to remove his armour so that he can kill the knight. Despite being at a disadvantage, Lancelot manages to kill the man and tells the wife: "Stop crying. Your husband was a fool and you are a bore. I'm not sorry" (though he reflects that he is). Later he comes across a man attempting to murder his wife for adultery. Lancelot attempts to protect the woman, who denies the charge, by riding in between the two, but the man manages to cut off his wife's head. The man then throws himself at Lancelot's feet and asks for mercy. It is revealed later that the man is punished by being charged to take his wife's head to the Pope and ask for forgiveness.

Finally, Lancelot comes to a town where the inhabitants beg him to rescue a young woman named Elaine, who is trapped in a tower. The tower is full of steam and she is forced to sit in a tub of boiling water. He manages to save her and her father has him spend the night. The servants and Elaine devise a plan in which the servants get Lancelot drunk and trick him into thinking that Guinevere is in the house. When he awakens in the morning he discovers that he has been deceived and seduced by Elaine. Furious at the loss of his virginity, which he believes has also cost him the ability to work miracles, and frightened at the thought that Elaine might have a baby, he leaves. He confesses the encounter (which was non-consensual on his part) to Guinevere, who forgives him. They later discover that Elaine has a baby, which she names Galahad (Lancelot's baptismal name). She brings the baby to Camelot to show to Lancelot and together they spend time with Galahad. Guinevere is furious at this and Lancelot goes mad and runs from the castle. Two years later he is found by Elaine's father, who does not recognise him, and is kept as a fool until Elaine recognises him. He lives with Elaine for some time, but then returns to Camelot. When Galahad grows older he is brought to Camelot to be knighted.

The Ill-Made Knight also deals with the quest for the Holy Grail. Arthur notices that the drop in crime has caused the Knights of the Round Table to fall back into their old habits, especially Gawaine, Agravaine, and Mordred, who find their mother in bed with one of King Pellinore's sons and murder both of them. In order to give the Knights a new goal Arthur sends them to find the Holy Grail. The quest ends when Sir Galahad, Sir Percival, Sir Bors, and Sir Pellinore's daughter find the Grail. Sir Lancelot sees the four in a room, with the Grail, an old man, and several other knights, but he is unable to enter the room himself. One of the knights returns with the news that the Grail could not be brought to England and as a result Sir Galahad and the other knight brought it to Babylon (and neither of them could return to England as well). Sir Pellinore's daughter died when she allowed her blood to be taken to cure a dying princess.

Elaine commits suicide after Lancelot tells her that he will not return to stay with her permanently. The book ends with Lancelot performing a miracle, even though he is not a virgin, which is the usual requirement for being able to do so.

== Reception ==
Contemporary reviews of The Ill-Made Knight were generally favorable, though several critics noted its more serious tone compared to White's earlier Arthurian novels. Reviewing the novel in the San Francisco Chronicle, Dewart Lewis wrote that White was not simply retelling Thomas Malory's Le Morte d'Arthur but creating an original interpretation that combined traditional legend with his own imagination. The Ithaca Journal described the book as "a psychological novel" rather than a "rollicking, magical" romance; while Kenneth Wilson of The Gazette praised White's "scandalous modernization" of Arthurian legend and his irreverent portrayal of legendary figures as ordinary human beings — despite finding it less amusing than its predecessors.

A more critical review in The Republican found the novel inferior to The Sword in the Stone and The Witch in the Wood, describing it as "overlong on explanation and short on whimsy". The reviewer argued that the book lacked the eccentric supporting characters that had enlivened White's earlier Arthurian novels, while acknowledging moments of humor and praising portions of the Holy Grail narrative.

== In other media ==
The Lerner and Loewe musical Camelot, first performed in 1960, was adapted from White's The Once and Future King, with most of the musical drawing on The Ill-Made Knight and The Candle in the Wind.

An audiobook edition, read by English actor Neville Jason, was released by Naxos Audio in 2008.
