= Dimsie Moves Up =

Novel by Dorita Fairlie Bruce

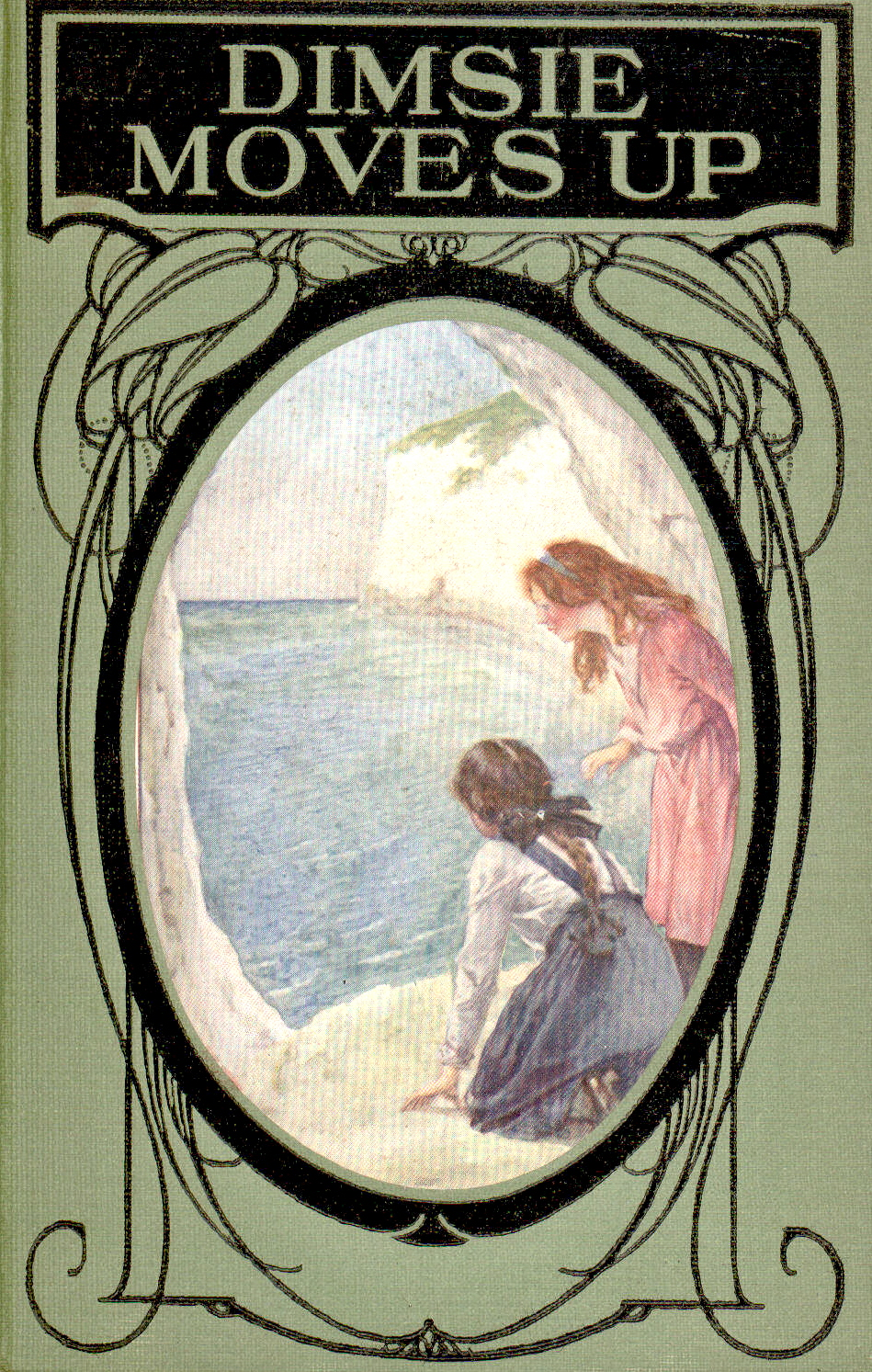
- 1924 Oxford University Press Hardcover Edition
- Author: Dorita Fairlie Bruce
- Illustrator: Wal Paget
- Language: English
- Series: Dimsie
- Genre: Children's novel
- Publisher: Oxford University Press
- Publication date: 1921
- Publication place: United Kingdom
- Media type: Print (Hardcover)
- Pages: 254 pp
- Preceded by: The Senior Prefect/Dimsie Goes To School
- Followed by: Dimsie Moves Up Again

Dimsie Moves Up is the second of the Dimsie books by author Dorita Fairlie Bruce. First published in 1921, the book was illustrated by Wal Paget. The protagonist Dimsie is now a year older and had moved up one grade at the Jane Willard Foundation. The Western Morning News's review described it as "a book that should prove a delight to all school girls" and noted that school sports were featured and that "the rivalry between forms makes thrilling reading."

The book illustrates the strong Christian element in Bruce's work when a girl reveals that she has prayed every night for the recovery of an important lost book.

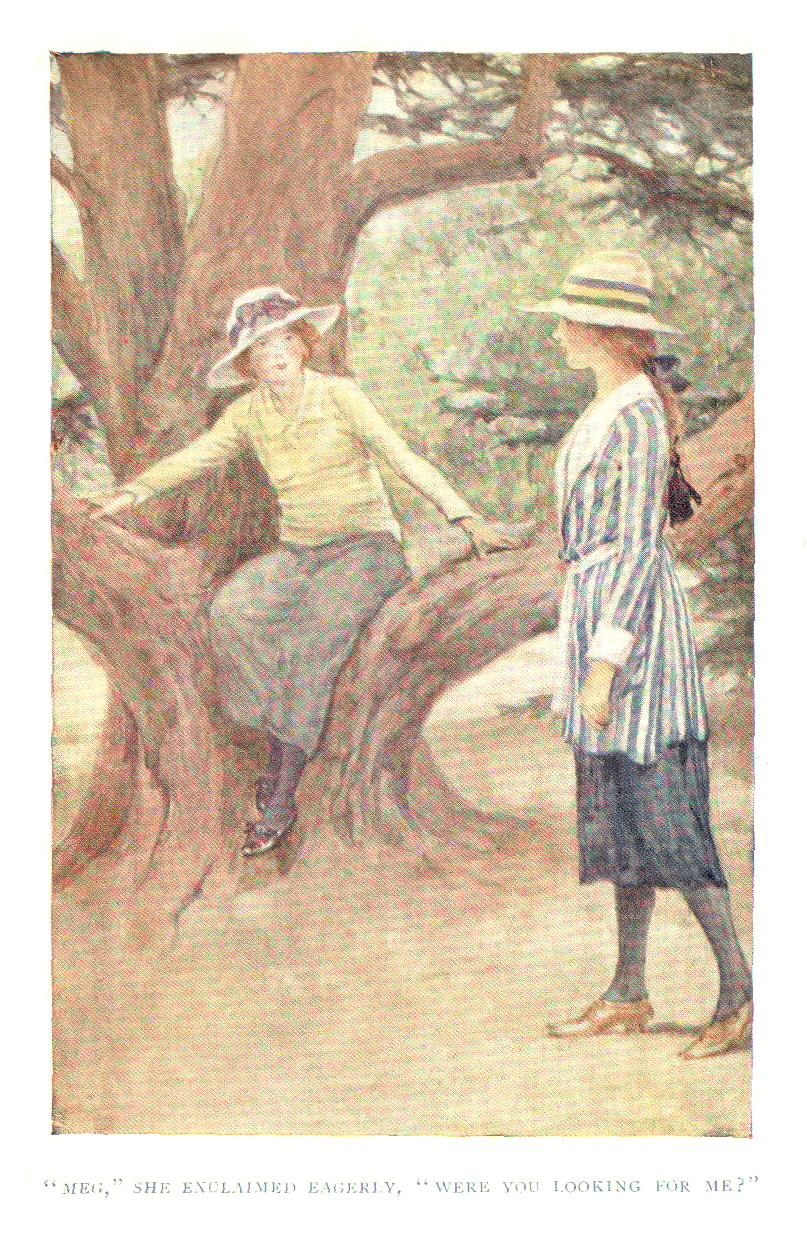
Frontispiece by Wal Paget from the 1924 Oxford University Press edition of Dimsie Moves Up. Click on image to enlarge.

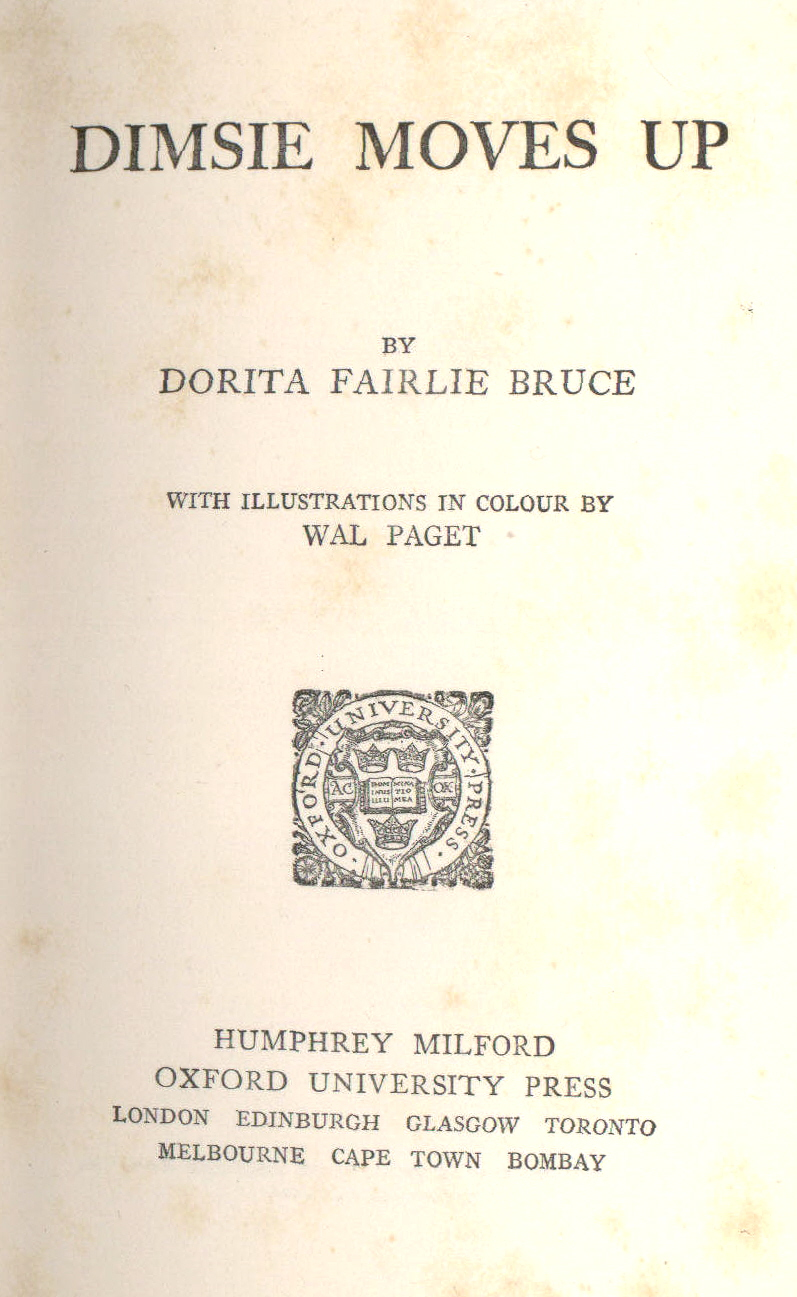
Title page from the 1924 Oxford University Press edition of Dimsie Moves Up. Click on image to enlarge.
