= George Mills (writer) =

British schoolmaster and writer (1896–1972)

- Born: George Ramsay Acland Mills; 1 October 1896; Bude, Cornwall, England
- Died: 8 December 1972 (aged 76); Budleigh Salterton, Devon, England
- Occupations: Schoolteacher, writer
- Writing career
- Genres: Children's literature, School story
- Notable works: Meredith and Co. (1933); King Willow (1938); Minor and Major (1939)
- Website: www.whoisgeorgemills.com

George Ramsay Acland Mills (1 October 1896 – 8 December 1972) was a British schoolmaster and writer whose fiction included children's and young adult novels, several of them set in fictional boys' preparatory schools.

== Life and career ==
=== Military service ===
During the Second World War, Mills served as an officer in the Royal Army Pay Corps. He was later appointed a lieutenant and paymaster in April 1942.

=== Writing ===
The British Library catalogue lists Mills as a "Writer of Tales for Boys" and records holdings of his published fiction from the 1930s.

== Works ==
Works by Mills listed in the British Library catalogue include:

- Meredith and Co.: The Story of a Modern Preparatory School (1933)
- King Willow (1938)
- Minor and Major (1939)
- St. Thomas of Canterbury (1939)
