= T. H. White =

English author (1906–1964)

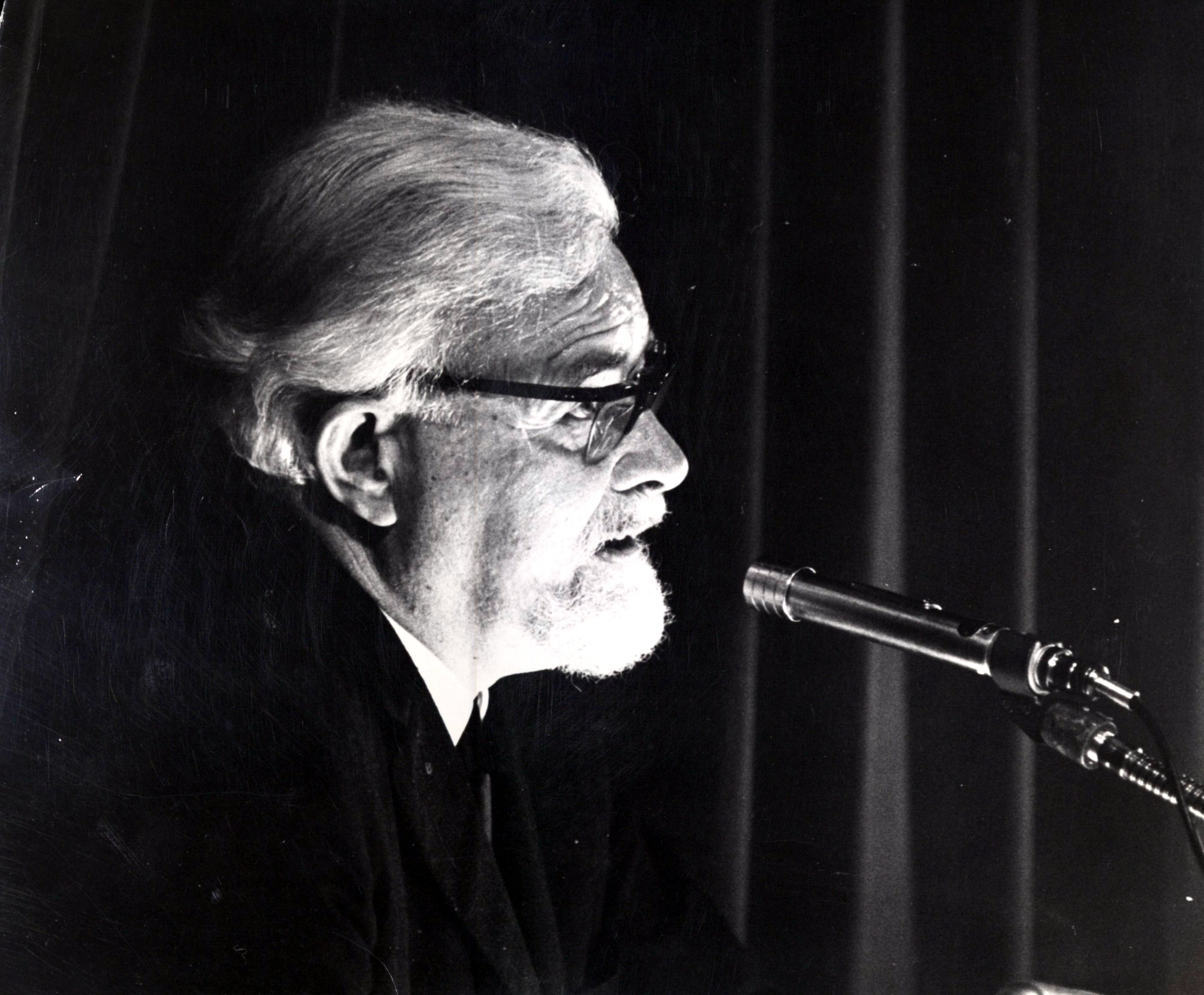
- White lecturing on his Arthurian fiction
- Born: Terence Hanbury White; 29 May 1906; Bombay, British India
- Died: 17 January 1964 (aged 57); Piraeus, Athens, Greece
- Other name: Tim
- Education: Cheltenham College
- Alma mater: Queens' College, Cambridge
- Occupation: Writer
- Writing career
- Genre: Fantasy

Terence Hanbury "Tim" White (29 May 1906 – 17 January 1964) was an English writer. He is best known for his Arthurian novels, which were published together in 1958 as The Once and Future King. One of his best known is the first of the series, The Sword in the Stone, which was published as a stand-alone book in 1938.

== Early life ==
White was born in Bombay, British India, to Garrick Hanbury White, a superintendent in the Indian police, and Constance Edith Southcote Aston. His parents moved with him to England in 1911. White had a troubled childhood, with an alcoholic father and an emotionally cold mother, and his parents separated when he was 14.

== Education and teaching ==
White went to Cheltenham College in Gloucestershire, a public school, and Queens' College, Cambridge, where he was tutored by the scholar and occasional author L. J. Potts, who became a lifelong friend and correspondent. White later referred to him as "the great literary influence in my life." While at Queens' College, White wrote a thesis on Thomas Malory's Le Morte d'Arthur, and graduated in 1928 with a first-class degree in English.

White then taught at Stowe School in Buckinghamshire for four years. In 1936 he published England Have My Bones, a well-received memoir about a year spent in England. The same year, he left Stowe School and lived in a workman's cottage nearby, where he wrote and "revert[ed] to a feral state", engaging in falconry, hunting, and fishing. White also became interested in aviation, partly to conquer his fear of heights.

== Writing ==
White's novel Earth Stopped (1934) and its sequel Gone to Ground (1935) are science fiction novels about a disaster that devastates the world. Gone to Ground contains several fantasy stories told by the survivors that were later reprinted in The Maharajah and Other Stories.

White wrote to a friend that, in autumn 1937, "I got desperate among my books and picked [Malory] up in lack of anything else. Then I was thrilled and astonished to find that (a) the thing was a perfect tragedy, with a beginning, a middle and an end implicit in the beginning and (b) the characters were real people with recognizable reactions which could be forecast. ... Anyway, I somehow started writing a book."

The novel, which White described as "a preface to Malory", was titled The Sword in the Stone and published in 1938, telling the story of the boyhood of King Arthur. White was also influenced by Freudian psychology and his own lifelong involvement in natural history. The Sword in the Stone was critically well received and was a Book of the Month Club selection in 1939.

In February 1939, White moved to Doolistown in County Meath, Ireland, where he lived out the Second World War as a de facto conscientious objector. During his stay in Ireland, White lived with an Irish couple, Paddy and Lena McDonagh, who continued to correspond with White after he had left the country. During his stay in Ireland, White met the Irish writers Frank O'Connor and Lord Dunsany. In Ireland, he wrote most of what became The Once and Future King: The Witch in the Wood (later cut and rewritten as The Queen of Air and Darkness) in 1939, and The Ill-Made Knight in 1940. The version of The Sword in the Stone included in The Once and Future King differs from the earlier version; it is darker, and some critics prefer the earlier version.

== Later life ==
In 1946, White settled in Alderney, the third-largest Channel Island, where he lived for the rest of his life. The same year, he published Mistress Masham's Repose, a children's book in which a young girl discovers a group of Lilliputians (the tiny people in Jonathan Swift's Gulliver's Travels) living near her house. Mistress Masham's Repose was influenced by John Masefield's book The Midnight Folk. In 1947, he published The Elephant and the Kangaroo, a novel in which a repetition of Noah's Flood occurs in Ireland. The Elephant and the Kangaroo provoked an angry reaction from Irish and Irish-American readers. These critics claimed that The Elephant and the Kangaroo depicted Irish people as being stupid and lazy, and that the book also contained an insulting depiction of Irish Catholicism. The Manhattan newspaper The Irish Echo described The Elephant and the Kangaroo as "just another typical English stab in the back." A copy of the book was given to the McDonagh family, who found the book hurtful, due to the fact that White had based two of the characters in The Elephant and the Kangaroo on them. As a result of The Elephant and the Kangaroo, the McDonaghs terminated their friendship with White.

In the early 1950s, he published two non-fiction books. The Age of Scandal (1950) is a collection of essays about 18th-century England. The Goshawk (1951) is an account of his attempt to train a northern goshawk using traditional rather than modern falconry techniques. He wrote it at his cottage in the mid-1930s, but he did not publish it until his agent David Garnett discovered it and insisted that it be published. In 1954, White translated and edited The Book of Beasts, an English translation of a medieval bestiary written in Latin.

In 1958, White completed the fourth book of The Once and Future King, The Candle in the Wind, which was first published with the other three parts and has never been published separately. White lived to see his Arthurian work adapted as the Broadway musical Camelot (1960) and the animated film The Sword in the Stone (1963).

== Death ==
White died of heart failure on 17 January 1964 aboard ship in Piraeus, Athens, Greece, en route to Alderney from a lecture tour in the United States. He is buried in the First Cemetery of Athens. The Book of Merlyn was published posthumously in 1977 as a conclusion to The Once and Future King. His papers are held by the University of Texas at Austin.

== Personal life ==
According to Sylvia Townsend Warner's 1967 biography, White was "a homosexual and a sado-masochist." He came close to marrying several times but had no enduring romantic relationships. In his diaries of Zed, a young boy, he wrote: "I have fallen in love with Zed ... the whole situation is an impossible one. All I can do is behave like a gentleman. It has been my hideous fate to be born with an infinite capacity for love and joy with no hope of using them."

Robert Robinson published an account of a conversation with White in which White claimed to be attracted to women. Robinson concluded that this was a cover for homosexuality. Julie Andrews wrote in her autobiography, "I believe Tim may have been an unfulfilled homosexual, and he suffered a lot because of it."

However, White's long-time friend and literary agent David Higham wrote, "Tim was no homosexual, though I think at one time he had feared he was (and in his ethos fear would have been the word)." Higham gave Sylvia Townsend Warner the address of one of White's lovers "so that she could get in touch with someone so important in Tim's story. But she never, the girl told me, took that step. So she was able to present Tim in such a light that a reviewer could call him a raging homosexual. Perhaps a heterosexual affair would have made her blush."

Lin Carter portrays White in Imaginary Worlds as a man who felt deeply but was unable to form close human relationships because of his unfortunate childhood. "He was a man with an enormous capacity for loving. It shows in his prodigious correspondence and in his affection for dogs, and in the bewildered and inarticulate loves his characters experience in his books; but he had few close friends, and no genuine relationship with a woman."

White was agnostic and a heavy drinker towards the end of his life. Warner wrote of him, "Notably free from fearing God, he was basically afraid of the human race."

== Influence ==
Fantasy writer Michael Moorcock enjoyed White's The Once and Future King, and was especially influenced by the underpinnings of realism in his work. Moorcock eventually engaged in a "wonderful correspondence" with White, and later recalled that White gave him "some very good advice on how to write".

J. K. Rowling has said that White's writing strongly influenced the Harry Potter books; several critics have compared Rowling's character Albus Dumbledore to White's absent-minded Merlyn, and Rowling herself has described White's Wart as "Harry's spiritual ancestor." Author Neil Gaiman was asked about the similarities between Harry Potter and Gaiman's character Timothy Hunter, and he stated that he did not think Rowling had based her character on Hunter. "I said to [the reporter] that I thought we were both just stealing from T. H. White: very straightforward."

Gregory Maguire was influenced by "White's ability to be intellectually broadminded, to be comic, to be poetic, and to be fantastic" in the writing of his 1995 novel Wicked, and crime fiction writer Ed McBain also cited White as an influence.

White features extensively in Helen Macdonald's H is for Hawk, winner of the 2014 Samuel Johnson Prize for non-fiction. One of the components of the book is a biographical account of White and also The Goshawk, an account of his own attempt to train a hawk.

== Adaptations ==
White sold the film rights to The Sword in the Stone to Walt Disney in 1939. Disney would not release an adaptation, however, until 1963.

In 1959, Alan Jay Lerner and Moss Hart decided to adapt the now-completed The Once and Future King as a stage musical. With music by Frederick Loewe, it premiered as Camelot in 1960.

In 1966, The Master was adapted as a six-part serial for British television. It starred Olaf Pooley, Paul Guess and Adrienne Posta.

His 1951 book, The Goshawk, was filmed as a television movie, directed by David Cobhamn, in 1968.

The Master was again adapted, in 1978, as an episode of the Canadian television anthology series The Magic Lie.

== Selected bibliography ==
- Loved Helen (1929)
- The Green Bay Tree (1929)
- Dead Mr Nixon (1931) (with R. McNair Scott)
- First Lesson (1932) (as James Aston)
- They Winter Abroad (1932) (as James Aston)
- Darkness at Pemberley (1932)
- Farewell Victoria (1933)
- Earth Stopped (1934)
- Gone to Ground (1935)
- England Have My Bones (1936)
- Burke's Steerage (1938)
- The Once and Future King
  - The Sword in the Stone (UK 1938, revised U.S. ed. 1939)
  - The Queen of Air and Darkness (original version 1939, as The Witch in the Wood)
  - The Ill-Made Knight (1940)
  - The Candle in the Wind (1958)
- Mistress Masham's Repose (1946)
- The Elephant and the Kangaroo (1947)
- The Age of Scandal (1950)
- The Goshawk (1951)
- The Scandalmonger (1952)
- The Book of Beasts (translator, 1954)
- The Master: An Adventure Story (1957)
- The Godstone and the Blackymor (1959)
- America at Last (1965)
- The Book of Merlyn (1977)
- A Joy Proposed (1980)
- The Maharajah and Other Stories (selections from Earth Stopped (1934) and Gone to Ground (1935), ed. Kurth Sprague) (1981)
- Letters to a Friend: The Correspondence Between T. H. White and L. J. Potts (1984)

== General and cited sources ==
- Sylvia Townsend Warner, T. H. White: A Biography (Viking 1967)
