= Winifred Darch =

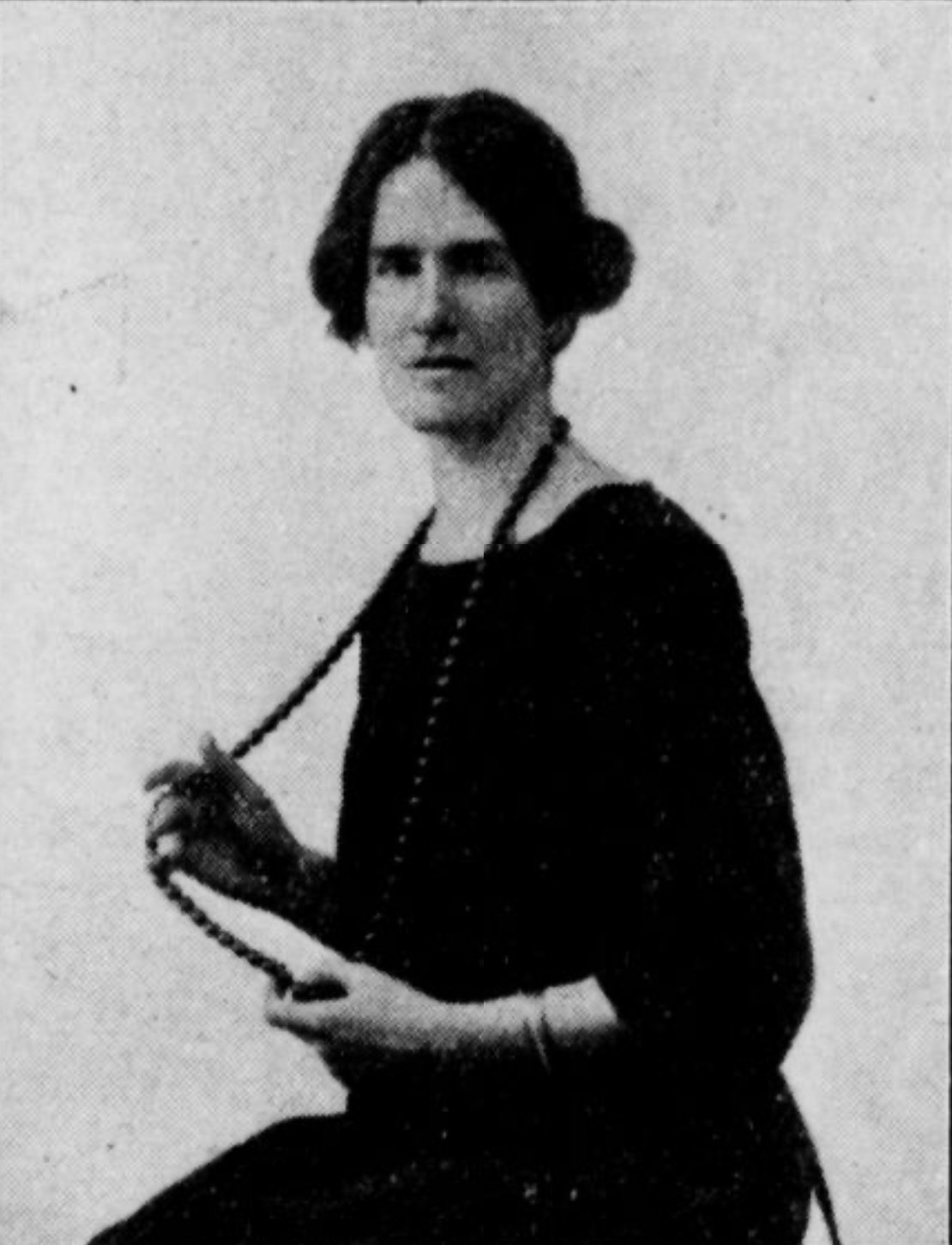
- The Bookseller, 1928
- Born: 7 February 1884; Brighton, England
- Died: 8 October 1960 (aged 77); Ashington, West Sussex, England
- Education: Cheltenham Ladies' College
- Years active: 1920–1939

Winifred Darch (7 February 1884 – 8 October 1960) was an English writer of girls' school stories in the interwar period. She was also a school mistress and teacher at a girls' high school, which influenced her writing.

== Biography ==
Darch was born in Brighton to schoolmaster and solicitor William Darch and Florence and grew up in Essex. She was the eldest of three children. Darch attended Leytonstone High School and then trained as a teacher at Cheltenham Ladies' College.

In 1906, Darch began teaching at the newly opened Loughton County High School for Girls. Her subjects included English, French, Greek history and scripture. She also served as a house mistress and oversaw a number of extracurricular activities, including putting on plays.

Darch began writing stories for her own pupils, debuting in 1920 with Chris and Some Others, but "speedily found a bigger public". She published her works through Humphrey's Oxford University Press (OUP).

Darch retired from teaching in 1935 to care for her parents in Ashington, West Sussex. Her final novel The New Girl at Graychurch was published in 1939. During World War II, she joined her local Women's Voluntary Service chapter and became president of the Women's Institute.

== Writing ==
Darch's writing was distinct from that of her contemporaries. While boarding school was the standard setting for contemporary school stories, which "did not reflect the education experience of most readers", Darch's were set in the new state-funded girls' high schools that opened after the Education Act 1902. Darch also wrote only standalone novels as opposed to series. Guiding featured in several of her books.

== Legacy ==
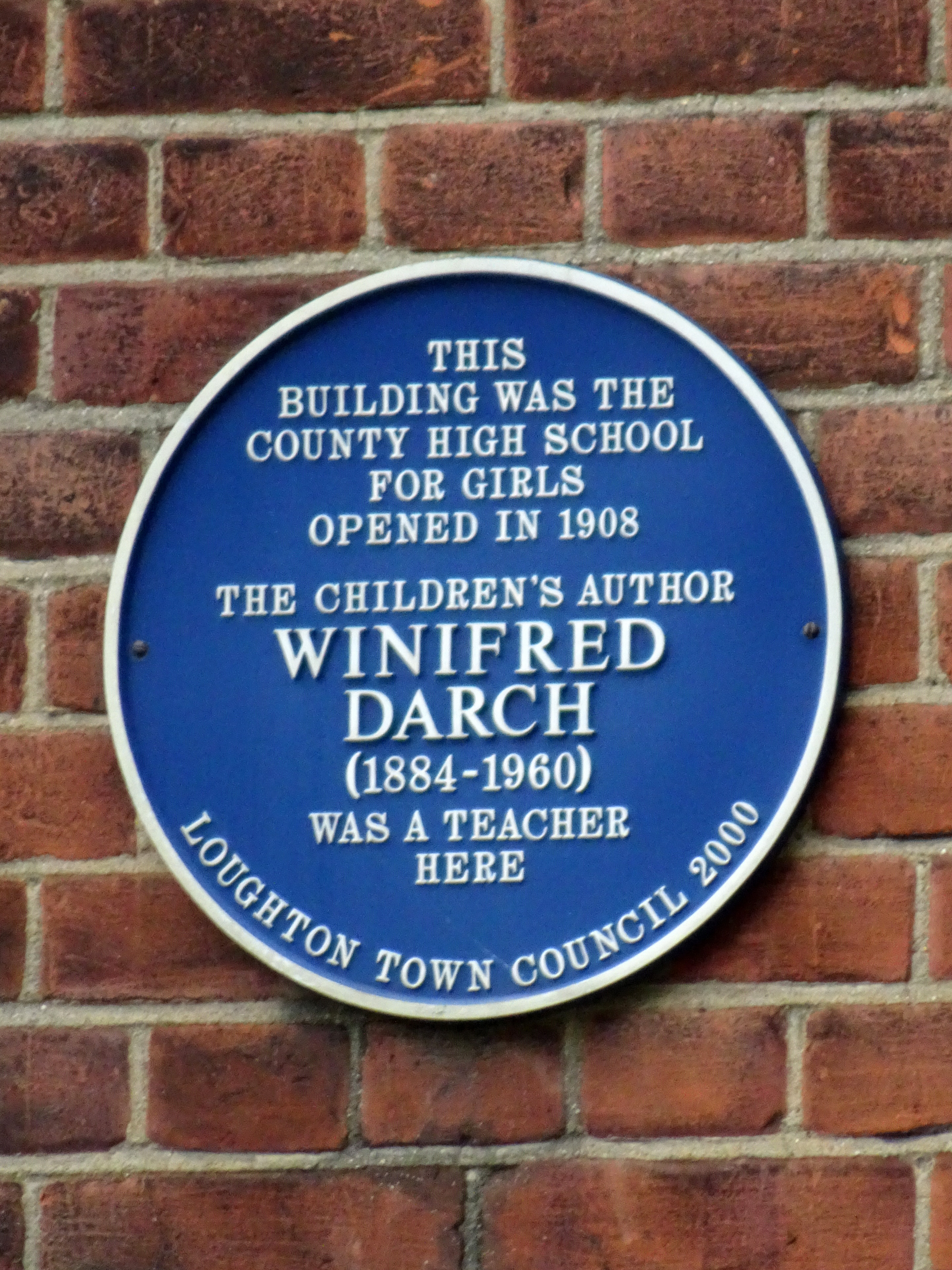
Blue plaque

Darch's funeral took place at Ashington Parish Church.

In 2000, Loughton Town Council honoured Darch with a blue plaque at Roding Valley High School.

Girls Gone By Publishers republished The New School and Hilary in 2008.

== Bibliography ==
- Chris and Some Others (1920)
- Jean of the Fifth (1923)
- Poppies and Prefects (1923)
- Cecil of the Carnations (1924)
- Heather at the High School (1924)
- Katharine Goes to School (1925)
- Gillian of the Guides (1925)
- The New School and Hilary (1926)
- Cicely Bassett, Patrol Leader (1927)
- Varvara Comes to England (1927)
- The Upper Fifth in Command (1928)
- For the Honour of the House (1929)
- The Fifth Form Rivals (1930)
- Margaret Plays the Game (1931)
- The Girls of Queen Elizabeth's (1932)
- The Lower Fourth and Joan (1932)
- The School on the Cliff (1933)
- The Head Girl at Wynford (1935)
- Susan's Last Term (1936)
- Elinor in the Fifth (1937)
- Alison Temple – Prefect (1938) (republished as Alison in a Fix)
- The Scholarship and Margery (1938),
- The New Girl at Graychurch (1939)
