= The Once and Future King =

1958 fantasy novel by T. H. White

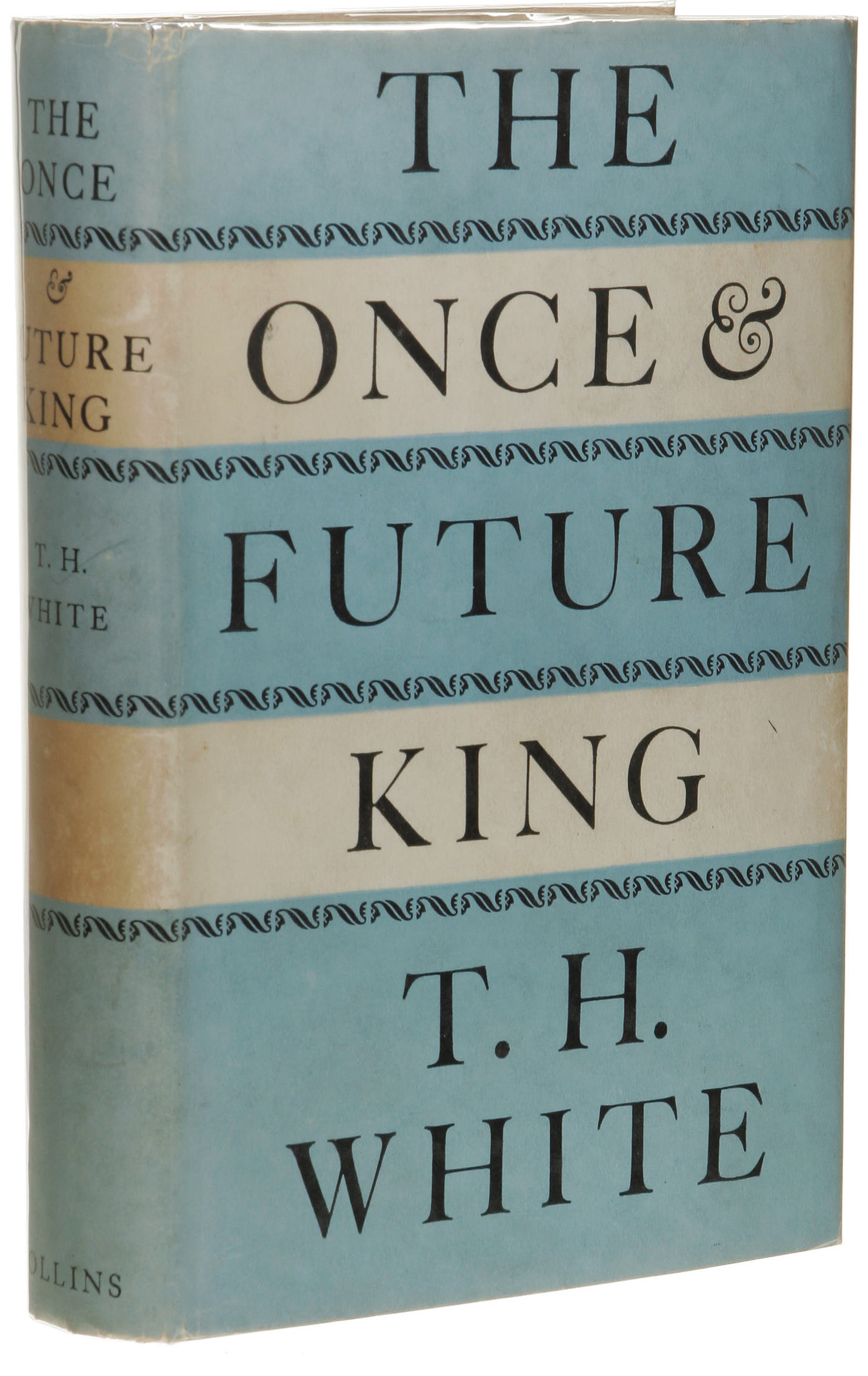
- First edition cover
- Author: T. H. White
- Language: English
- Genre: Fantasy
- Set in: England, c. 1200–1485
- Publisher: Collins
- Publication date: 1958
- Publication place: United Kingdom
- Media type: Print (hardback and paperback)
- OCLC: 35661057
- Dewey Decimal: 823/.912 21
- LC Class: PR6045.H2 O5 1996

The Once and Future King is a collection of fantasy novels by T. H. White about the legend of King Arthur. It is loosely based upon the 1485 work Le Morte d'Arthur by Sir Thomas Malory. It was first published in 1958 as a collection of shorter novels that were published from 1938 to 1940, with some new or amended material. The title refers to a legend that Arthur will one day return as king.

== Plot ==
Most of the book takes place in Gramarye, the name that White gives to Britain, and chronicles the youth and education of King Arthur, his rule as king, and the romance between Sir Lancelot and Queen Guinevere. The story starts in the final years of the rule of King Uther Pendragon, Arthur's father.

=== The Sword in the Stone ===
The first part, "The Sword in the Stone" (first published 1938), chronicles Arthur's upbringing by his foster father Sir Ector, his rivalry and friendship with his foster brother Kay, and his initial training by Merlyn, a wizard who lives through time backwards. Merlyn, knowing the boy's destiny, teaches Arthur (known as "Wart") what it means to be a good king by turning him into various kinds of animals: fish, hawk, ant, goose, and badger. Each of the transformations is meant to teach Wart a lesson, which will prepare him for his future life. Merlyn instills in Arthur the concept that the only justifiable reason for war is to prevent another from going to war and that contemporary human governments and powerful people exemplify the worst aspects of the rule of Might.

=== The Queen of Air and Darkness ===
White sets the stage for Arthur's demise by introducing the Orkney clan and detailing Arthur's seduction by their mother, his half-sister Queen Morgause. While the young king suppresses initial rebellions, Merlyn leads him to envision a means of harnessing potentially destructive Might for the cause of Right: the chivalric order of the Round Table.

=== The Ill-Made Knight ===
The focus shifts from King Arthur to the story of Sir Lancelot and Queen Guinevere's forbidden love, the means they adopt to hide their affair from the King (although he already knows of it from Merlyn), and its effect on Elaine, Lancelot's two-time seducer and the mother of Galahad.

=== The Candle in the Wind ===
Mordred's hatred of his father and Sir Agravaine's hatred of Lancelot cause the eventual downfall of Arthur, Guinevere, Lancelot, and the entire ideal kingdom of Camelot. The "Candle in the Wind" is an allegory to the hope of progress. Arthur sends little Tom (Sir Thomas Mallory) to be a vessel and carry on his ideas from his famous round table.

=== The Book of Merlyn ===
Published separately following White's death, this book chronicles Arthur's final lessons from Merlyn and his final battle with Mordred.

== Reception ==
Floyd C. Gale praised The Sword in the Stone as "blithely comic and entirely delightful", stating that it was "in utter contrast to the mounting tragedy" of the other three volumes of the series. Fantasy historian Lin Carter called The Once and Future King "the single finest fantasy novel written in our time, or for that matter, ever written." In a 2017 essay for Vox, Constance Grady described The Once and Future King as "an extended political allegory" that uses Arthurian legend to explore war, power, and the proper use of violence, and praised White's portrayal of Lancelot as his "greatest literary achievement." Grady stated, "White was writing for a post–World War II audience, but his book has a vigor and clarity that makes it an urgent and important read today."

== Adaptations ==
Walt Disney initially purchased the film rights to The Ill-Made Knight in 1944, and he produced an adaptation of The Sword in the Stone, released in 1963.

Alan Jay Lerner and Frederick Loewe's 1960 musical Camelot (which was made into a movie in 1967) is based mostly on the last two books of The Once and Future King and features White's idea of having Thomas Malory make a cameo appearance at the end, again as "Tom of Warwick".

BBC Radio produced a dramatised version of "The Sword in the Stone" for Children's Hour shortly after its publication in 1938. Incidental music for the serial was specially composed by Benjamin Britten.

A two-hour version of The Sword in the Stone, dramatised by Neville Teller, was first broadcast as a Saturday Night Theatre on Boxing Day, 1981. Michael Hordern played Merlyn and Toby Robertson was the Wart. The cast included Pauline Letts, David Davis, Jeffrey Segal and Lewis Stringer. Benjamin Britten's incidental music, played by the English Sinfonia, was used in the production, which was by Graham Gauld.

BBC Radio 4 serialised the book in six one-hour episodes dramatised by Brian Sibley, beginning on Sunday 9 November 2014 with Paul Ready as Arthur and David Warner as Merlyn.
