= William Farr =

British epidemiologist (1807–1883)

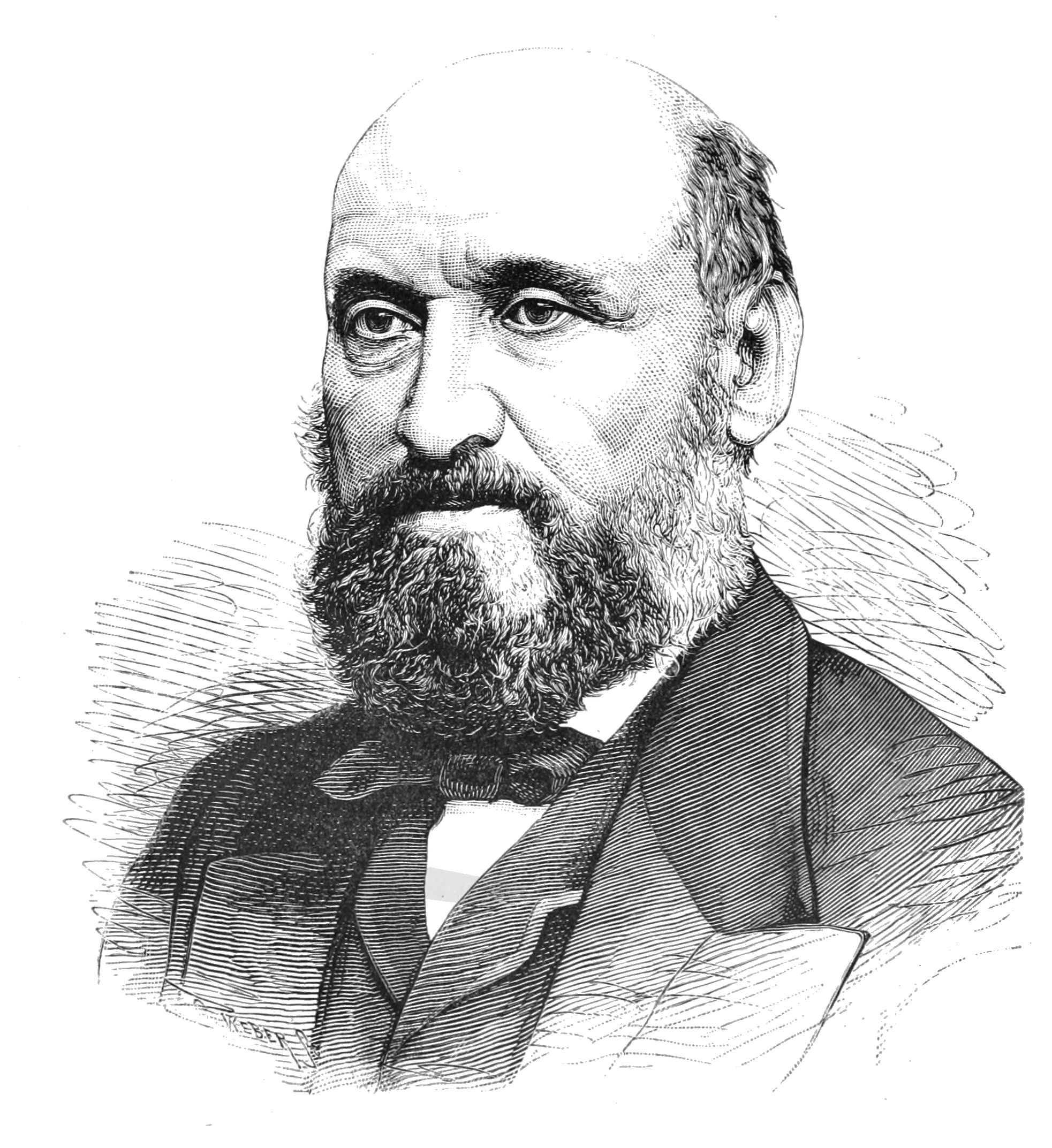
William Farr

William Farr CB (30 November 1807 – 14 April 1883) was a British epidemiologist, regarded as one of the founders of medical statistics.

== Early life ==
William Farr was born in Kenley, Shropshire, to poor parents. He was effectively adopted by a local squire, Joseph Pryce, when Farr and his family moved to Dorrington. In 1826 he took a job as a dresser (surgeon's assistant) in the Salop Infirmary in Shrewsbury and served a nominal apprenticeship to an apothecary. Pryce died in November 1828, and left Farr £500 (equivalent to £47,000 in 2025), which allowed him to study medicine in France and Switzerland. In Paris he heard Pierre Charles Alexandre Louis lecture.

Farr returned to England in 1831 and continued his studies at University College London, qualifying as a licentiate of the Society of Apothecaries in March 1832. He married in 1833 and started a medical practice in Fitzroy Square, London. He became involved in medical journalism and statistics.

== General Register Office ==
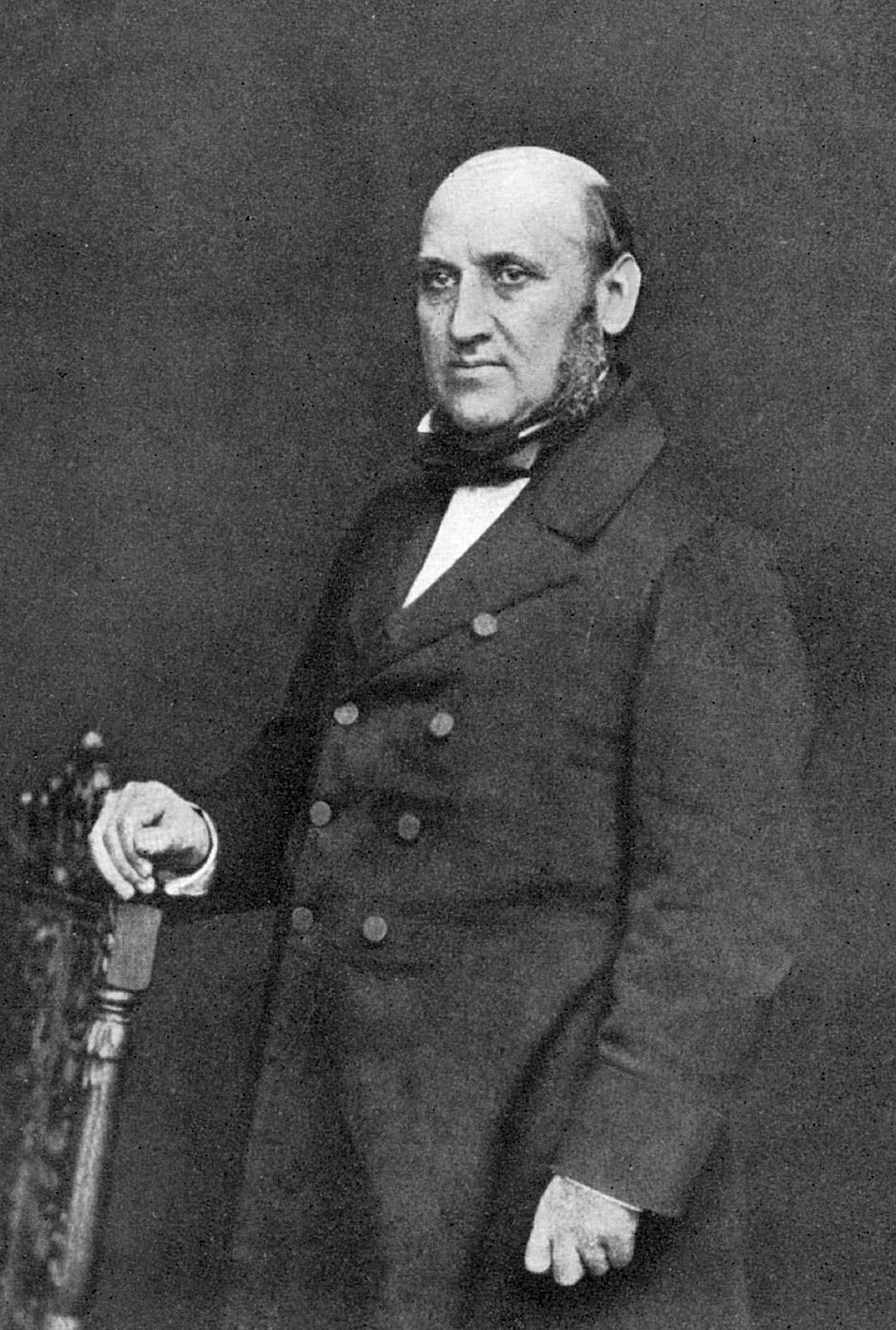
William Farr, about 1850

In 1837 the General Register Office (GRO) took on the responsibility for the United Kingdom Census 1841. Farr was hired there, initially on a temporary basis to handle data from vital registration. Then, with a recommendation from Edwin Chadwick and backing from Neil Arnott, Farr secured another post in the GRO as the first compiler of scientific abstracts (i.e. a statistician). Chadwick and Farr had an agenda, demography aimed at public health, and the support of the initial Registrar General Thomas Henry Lister. Lister worked with Farr on the census design, to forward the programme.

Farr was responsible for the collection of official medical statistics in England and Wales. His most important contribution was to set up a system for routinely recording the causes of death. For example, for the first time it allowed the mortality rates of different occupations to be compared.

== Learned societies and associations ==
In 1839, Farr joined the Statistical Society, in which he played an active part as treasurer, vice-president and president over the years. In 1855 he was elected Fellow of the Royal Society. He was involved in the Social Science Association from its foundation in 1857, taking part in its Quarantine Committee and Committee on Trades' Societies and Strikes.

== Law of epidemics ==
In 1840, Farr submitted a letter to the Annual Report of the Registrar General of Births, Deaths and Marriages in England. In that letter, he applied mathematics to the records of deaths during a recent smallpox epidemic, proposing that:

"If the latent cause of epidemics cannot be discovered, the mode in which it operates may be investigated. The laws of its action may be determined by observation, as well as the circumstances in which epidemics arise, or by which they may be controlled."

He showed that during the smallpox epidemic, a plot of the number of deaths per quarter followed a roughly bell-shaped or "normal curve", and that recent epidemics of other diseases had followed a similar pattern.

== Research on cholera ==
There was a major outbreak of cholera in London in 1849 which killed around 15,000 people. Early industrialisation had made London the most populous city in the world at the time, and the River Thames was heavily polluted with untreated sewage. Farr subscribed to the conventional theory that cholera was carried by polluted air rather than water – the miasmic theory. In addition, through his analysis of several variables and their association with death from cholera, Farr held the belief that elevation was the major contributor to the occurrence of the disease. He also presented how topographical features are able to prevent certain diseases similarly to immunization.

During the 1853-54 epidemic, Farr gathered more statistical evidence. During focused study of the 1854 Broad Street cholera outbreak, the physician John Snow used data supplied by the GRO and applied the (now accepted) mechanism for transmission he had proposed in 1849: people were infected by swallowing something, and it multiplied in the intestines. Snow also examined mortality statistics compiled by the GRO for people supplied with water from two companies in South London – the Southwark and Vauxhall Waterworks Company (which drew contaminated water from low in the Thames basin) and the Lambeth Waterworks Company (which drew cleaner water from further up the Thames) – and found Southwark and Vauxhall customers were especially likely to suffer.

Farr took part in the General Board of Health's 1854 Committee for Scientific Enquiries. The conventional explanation for cholera was still multifactorial; Snow's view of cholera as solely caused by a pathogen was not accepted, though his evidence was taken seriously. Farr's research was detailed and showed an inverse correlation of mortality and elevation.

There was a further epidemic in 1866, by which time Snow had died, and Farr had accepted Snow's explanation. He produced a monograph which showed that mortality was extremely high for people who drew their water from the Old Ford Reservoir in East London. Farr's work was then considered conclusive.

== Later life ==
In 1858, he performed a study on the correlation of health and marriage condition, and found that health decreases from the married to the unmarried to the widowed. In the period 1857–9 the Office ordered a difference engine, a model designed by Swedish followers of Charles Babbage. The intended application was the "British Life Table".

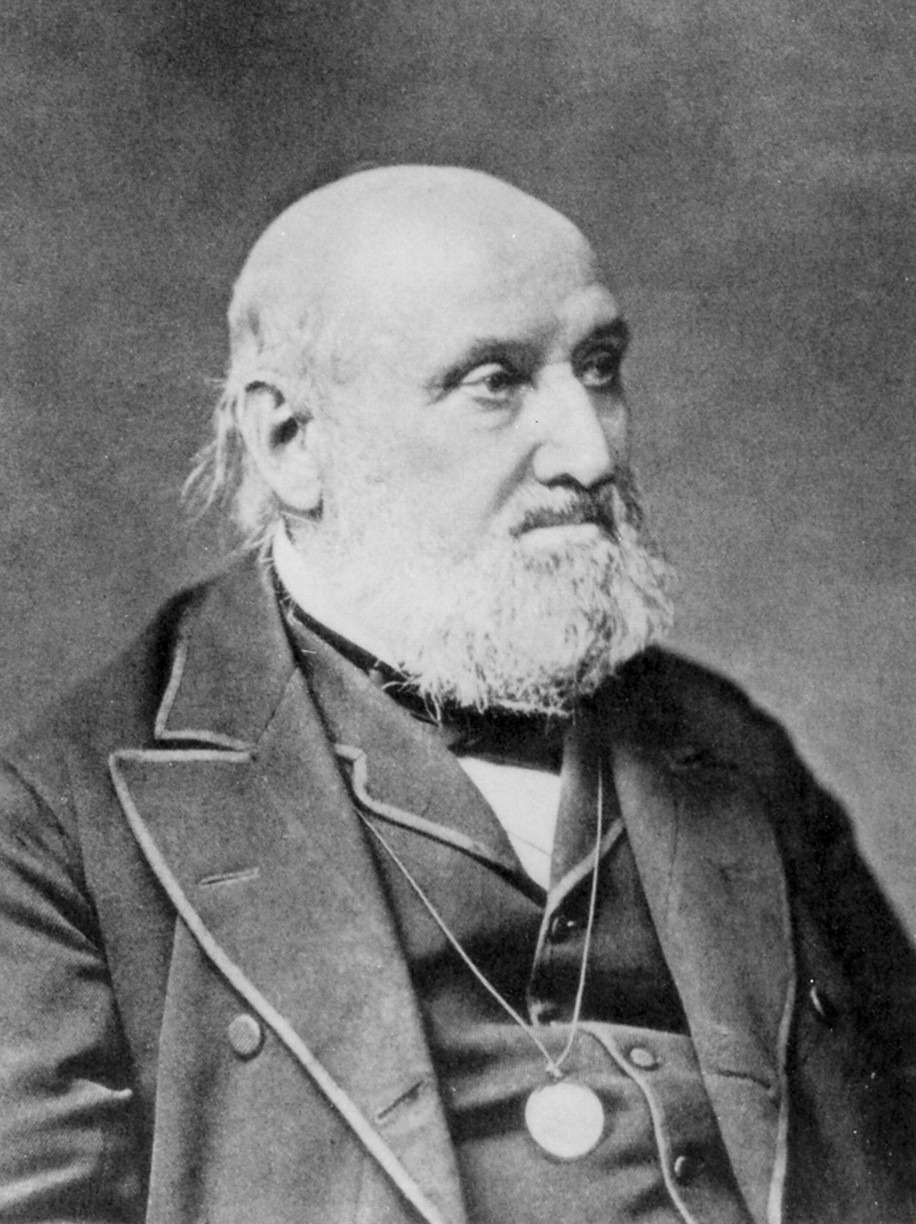
William Farr, about 1870

In 1862 Farr was paid £300 (equivalent to £31,500 in 2025) for producing a report on the Metropolitan Police Superannuation Fund, an early pension provision for that organisation. He also served as a commissioner in the 1871 census, retiring from the General Register Office in 1879 after he was not given the post of Registrar General, the position going to Sir Brydges Henniker. The same year, Farr received as honours a Companionship of the Bath and the Gold Medal of the British Medical Association for his work in the field of biostatistics.

In his last years, Farr's approach had become obsolescent. Bacteriology had changed the face of the medical issues, and statistics became an increasingly mathematic tool. Medical reformers, too, changed approach, expecting less from legislation and central government.

Farr died aged 75 at his home in Maida Vale, London, and was buried in the churchyard at Holy Trinity, Bromley Common.

== Works ==
In 1837 Farr wrote the chapter "Vital Statistics" for John Ramsey McCulloch's Statistical Account of the British Empire. In January 1837 he established the British Annals of Medicine, Pharmacy, Vital Statistics, and General Science, discontinued in August of that year. He revised a book of James Fernandez Clarke on tuberculosis.

Farr exploited his GRO post compiling abstracts in a way that went beyond the original job description. In so doing he applied the techniques of the English actuary Benjamin Gompertz (the Gompertz curve), and the closely allied statistical "law of mortality" of his fellow actuary Thomas Rowe Edmonds. Farr, by relying on the existing mathematical model of mortality, could use data sampling to cut back the required computation. From the GRO data he constructed a series of national life tables.

The theory of zymotic disease was Farr's contribution to the debate on aetiology. He identified urbanisation and population density as public health issues. In terms of nosology he classed epidemic, endemic and contagious diseases as "zymotic", seen as diseases of filth and overcrowding.

A selection of his statistical writings was published in 1885, edited by Noël Humphreys.

== In drama ==
In "The Sewer King", an episode in the 2003 British television documentary series Seven Wonders of the Industrial World, Farr was played by Norman Lovett.

== Family ==
Farr's first wife, whom he married in 1833, had the surname Langford; she died of tuberculosis in 1837. He married Mary Elizabeth Whittal in 1842, and they had eight children. In 1880 a public testimonial was collected to provide for his daughters after he lost money through unwise investments.

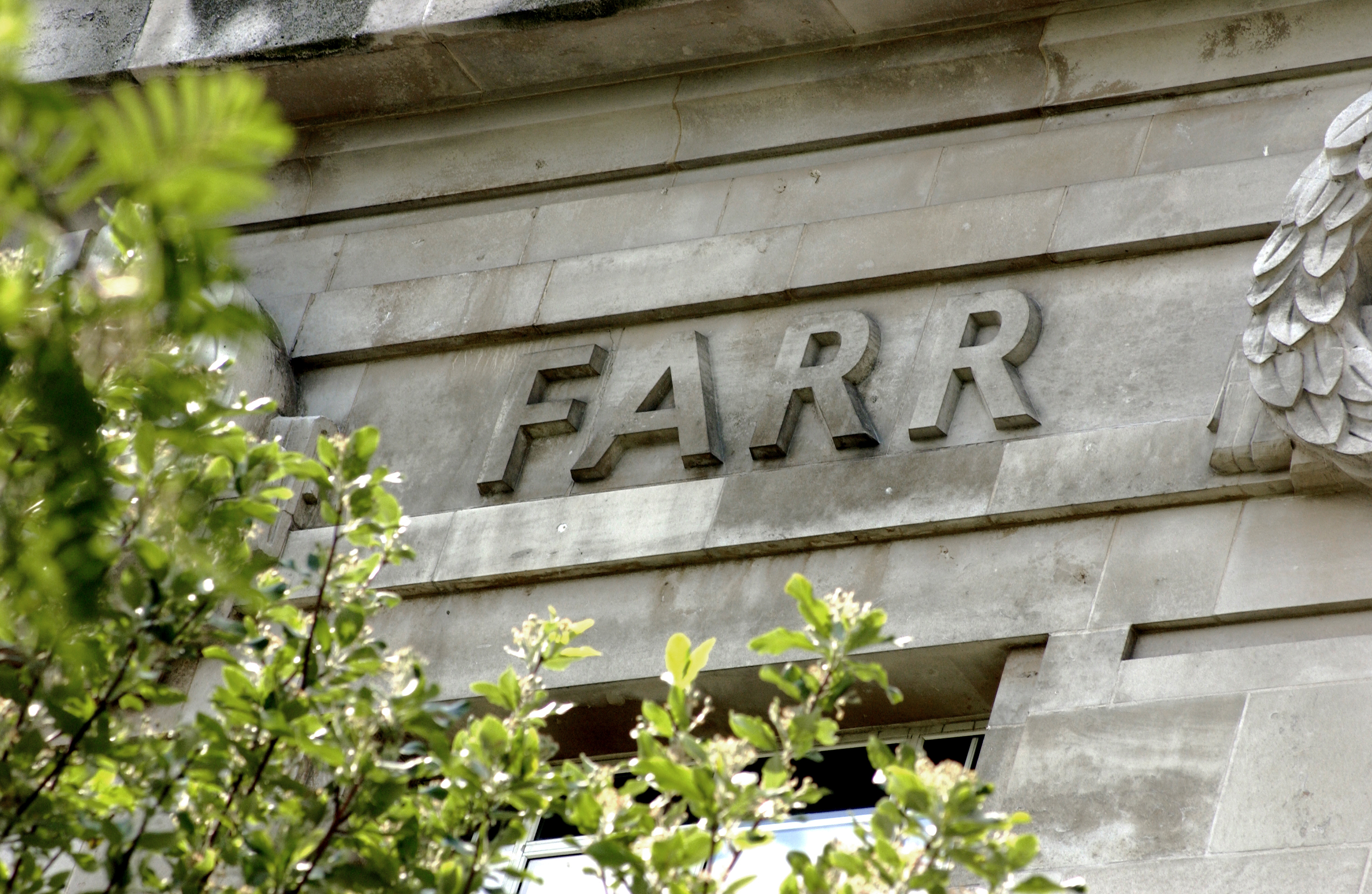
William Farr's name on the Frieze of the LSHTM building

One daughter, Henrietta, was married to painter and illustrator Henry Marriott Paget, the older brother of illustrators Sidney and Walter Paget. Another daughter, Florence Farr, was also a painter and artist and a model of many famous art deco works of art. The Pagets as well as the Farr sisters lived and worked in Bedford Park, the famous artist's colony in West London.

== Recognition ==
Farr's name features on the Frieze of the London School of Hygiene & Tropical Medicine. Twenty-three names of public health and tropical medicine pioneers were chosen to appear on the School building in Keppel Street when it was constructed in 1926.

In 1884, Farriolla, which is a genus of fungi in the Ascomycota phylum, was named in William Farr's honour.

== Biographies ==
- Eyler, John (1979). Victorian Social Medicine: The Ideas and Methods of William Farr. Baltimore: Johns Hopkins University Press.
- Dupaquier, Michel (2001). "William Farr". In C. C. Hyde; E. Seneta (eds.). Statisticians of the Centuries. New York: Springer. pp. 163–166.
