= Farriolla =

Scientific classification
- Domain: Eukaryota
- Kingdom: Fungi
- Division: Ascomycota
- Class: incertae sedis
- Genus: Farriolla; Norman, 1885

Type species
- Farriolla distans Norman, 1884

Synonyms
- Farriollomyces Ciferri & Tomaselli, 1953

Genus of fungi

Farriolla is a genus of fungi in the Ascomycota phylum. The relationship of this taxon to other taxa within the phylum is unknown (incertae sedis), and it has not yet been placed with certainty into any class, order, or family.

The genus name of Farriolla is in honour of William Farr (1807–1883), who was a British epidemiologist, regarded as one of the founders of medical statistics.

The genus was circumscribed by Johannes Musaeus Norman in Öfvers. Kongl. Vetensk.-Akad. Förh. Vol.41 (Issue 4) on page 134 in 1884.

== See also ==
- List of Ascomycota genera incertae sedis
