= British Annals of Medicine, Pharmacy, Vital Statistics, and General Science =

- Discipline: Medicine
- Language: English
- Edited by: William Farr

Publication details
- History: 1836–1837
- Publisher: Sherwood, Gilbert and Piper (United Kingdom)

Standard abbreviations
- ISO 4: Br. Ann. Med. Pharm. Vital Stat. Gen. Sci.

The British Annals of Medicine, Pharmacy, Vital Statistics, and General Science was a weekly publication edited by William Farr that ran from only January to August 1837. Although short-lived, it was succeeded by Farr's other journals and was influential in the development of vital statistics.
