= Contingent contagionism =

Contingent contagionism was a concept in 19th-century medical writing and epidemiology before the germ theory, used as a qualified way of rejecting the application of the term "contagious disease" for a particular infection. For example, it could be stated that cholera, or typhus, was not contagious in a "healthy atmosphere", but might be contagious in an "impure atmosphere". Contingent contagionism covered a wide range of views between "contagionist", and "anti-contagionist" such as held by supporters of the miasma theory. In the 1840s, public health policy in the United Kingdom became a battleground between contagionist and anti-contagionist parties, particularly over the use of quarantine measures.

== Background ==
A form of contingent contagionism was standard in medieval European medicine. Contagion was not conceptualised as restricted to physical contact. A corruption of air could be transmitted from person to person, at short range.

== Contagionists versus anticontagionists ==
By the 1840s public health policy, at least in the United Kingdom, had become a battleground between contagionist and anti-contagionist parties. The former, in particular, supported quarantine measures against epidemics (such as the cholera pandemic). The latter opposed quarantines. Anticontagionists, for example, argued that infection could be at a distance, from a cause that could be sporadic and possible diffused through the air, and taking advantage of "predisposed" individuals. Public health measures quite typically combined contagionist and anti-contagionist aspects. Anti-contagionists, such as Florence Nightingale who was a convinced miasmatist, could collaborate with contingent contagionists on sanitary measures.

== The "filth theory" ==
Decomposing organic waste, as "filth", was considered implicated in many diseases, because of the gases it generated. The application of contingent contagionism could be that there was a contagious agent that was spread by filthy conditions. Sanitation as cleaning was therefore directly associated with public health. It has been commented that those involved in public health at this time, successful in bringing down death rates, "often attributed disease causation to levels farther up the causal chain than direct biological mechanisms".

== Ventilation ==
The Medico-chirurgical Review in 1824 wrote that it had "always advocated" the doctrine of contingent contagion in the case of yellow fever "and indeed in most fevers". Having mentioned William Pym (contagionist) and Edward Nathaniel Bancroft (anti-contagionist) as extremists, it went on to say (italics in the original)

That the yellow fever of the West Indies [...] is rarely contagious, under common circumstances of cleanliness and ventilation, is as well ascertained as any fact in medicine.

Which it qualified in terms of overcrowding, and an outbreak in 1823 on the sloop HMS Bann.

The influence of atmosphere on contagion was subject to a distinction: a "pure" atmosphere might effectively block airborne contagion, while an "impure" atmosphere was ineffective for that; or on the other hand "impure" atmosphere, as well as crowding and filth, might mean a disease could "acquire" the property of contagion. A "malignant microenvironment" could be to blame, a hypothesis that had a consensus behind it in the aetiology of the middle of the 19th century. Inadequate ventilation was one factor to which the consensus pointed.

== Zymotic theory ==
Zymotic theory was an explanation of disease developed by Justus von Liebig and William Farr in the 1840s. A form of contingent contagionism, it began with a hypothesis on decomposition of large complex molecules, depending on collision with other such molecules. It relied on fermentation as an underlying analogy for disease.
