= Vital statistics (government records) =

Accumulated data on the vital events of a country's population

Vital statistics is accumulated data gathered on live births, deaths, migration, fetal deaths, marriages and divorces. The most common way of collecting information on these events is through civil registration, an administrative system used by governments to record vital events which occur in their populations. Efforts to improve the quality of vital statistics will therefore be closely related to the development of civil registration systems in countries. Civil registration followed the practice of churches keeping such records since the 19th century.

This article covers mainly the US, UK and Canada, with references to global standards.

== Definitions ==
A vital statistics system is defined by the United Nations "as the total process of (a) collecting information by civil registration or enumeration on the frequency or occurrence of specified and defined vital events, as well as relevant characteristics of the events themselves and the person or persons concerned, and (b) compiling, processing, analyzing, evaluating, presenting, and disseminating these data in statistical form"

Civil registration is defined by the United Nations as the" continuous, permanent, compulsory, and universal recording of the occurrence and characteristics of vital events (live births, deaths, fetal deaths, marriages, and divorces) and other civil status events pertaining to the population as provided by decree, law or regulation, in accordance with the legal requirements in each country."

== History ==
=== United Kingdom ===
Prior to the creation of the General Register Office (GRO) in 1837, there was no national system of civil registration in England and Wales. Baptisms, marriages and burials were recorded in parish registers maintained by Church of England (Anglican) clergy. However, with the great increase in nonconformity and the gradual relaxation of the laws against Catholics and other dissenters from the late 17th century, more and more baptisms, marriages and burials were going unrecorded in the registers of the Anglican Church.

The increasingly poor state of English parish registration led to numerous attempts to shore up the system in the 18th and early 19th centuries. The Marriage Act 1753 attempted to prevent 'clandestine' marriages by imposing a standard form of entry for marriages, which had to be signed by both parties to the marriage and by witnesses. Additionally, except in the case of Jews and Quakers, legal marriages had to be carried out according to the rites of the Church of England. Sir George Rose's Parochial Registers Act 1812 (52 Geo. 3. c. 146) laid down that all events had to be entered on standard entries in bound volumes. It also declared that the church registers of Nonconformists were not admissible in court as evidence of births, marriages and deaths. Only those maintained by the clergy of the Church of England could be presented in court as legal documents, and this caused considerable hardship for Nonconformists. A number of proposals were presented to Parliament to set up centralised registries for recording vital events in the 1820s but none came to fruition.

Eventually, increasing concern that the poor registration of baptisms, marriages and burials undermined property rights, by making it difficult to establish lines of descent, coupled with the complaints of Nonconformists, led to the establishment in 1833 of a parliamentary Select Committee on Parochial Registration. This took evidence on the state of the parochial system of registration, and made proposals that were eventually incorporated into the Registration Act 1836 and the Marriage Act 1836. In addition, the government wanted to survey matters such as infant mortality, fertility and literacy to bring about improvements in health and social welfare. The medical establishment advocated this because a rapidly growing population in the northern industrial towns – caused by the Industrial Revolution – had created severe overcrowding, and the links between poor living conditions and short life expectancy were now known.

The answer was the establishment of a civil registration system. It was hoped that improved registration of vital events would protect property rights through the more accurate recording of lines of descent. Civil registration would also remove the need for Nonconformists to rely upon the Church of England for registration, and provide medical data for research. As a result the Births and Deaths Registration Act 1836 (6 & 7 Will. 4. c. 86) was passed that ordered the civil registration of births, marriages and deaths in England and Wales. This took effect from 1 July 1837. A General Register Office was set up in London and the office of Registrar General was established.

England and Wales were divided into 619 registration districts (623 from 1851), each under the supervision of a superintendent registrar. The districts were based on the recently introduced poor law unions. The registration districts were further divided into sub-districts (there could be two or more), each under the charge of registrars who were appointed locally.

The General Register Office for Scotland was created in 1854. The General Register Office (Northern Ireland) holds records from 1864 onward for what is now Northern Ireland.

== Methods ==
While the number of births and deaths can be obtained by enumeration at certain points in time (e.g. censuses and surveys), civil registration collects this information on a continuous basis and is the only source that provides individuals with a legal document. For instance, the importance of birth registration as the first legal recognition of the child is emphasized in Article 7 of the Convention on the Rights of the Child which states that "the child shall be registered immediately after birth and shall have the right from birth to a name, the right to acquire a nationality and, as far as possible, the right to know and be cared for by his or her parents". United Nations Children's Fund (UNICEF) and a number of non-governmental organizations (Plan International, Save the Children Fund, World Vision, etc.) have particularly promoted the human rights aspects of registration, while the United Nations Statistics Division (UNSD), United Nations Population Fund (UNFPA) and World Health Organization (WHO) have focused more on the statistical aspects of civil registration.

Registration generally takes place at the local level, and the data are then aggregated to province or state and then national totals.

== Convention on Rights of the Child ==
Countries which are signatories to the Convention on the Rights of the Child are therefore expected to set up systems to register the births of all children. Non-registration of a child can have negative consequences on the wider enjoyment of a child's fundamental rights to benefits such as identity, inheritance, education, health and other social services. Birth registration is also part of a broader strategy to ensure that children are less vulnerable to abuse and exploitation, especially if separated from their parents. In the absence of a functioning birth registration system, it is difficult to see how a country can enforce age-related legal concerns such as schooling, child labour, juvenile justice, early marriage, sexual exploitation and military recruitment. Recent natural disasters and calamities have also demonstrated the utility of a birth certificate for reuniting lost children with their families.

== Records of death and cause of death ==
Many civil registration systems also collect information on causes of death. Statistics based on these death records are of particular importance in public health for identifying the magnitude and distribution of major disease problems, and are essential for the design, implementation, monitoring, and assessment of health programmes and policies.

== Global health records ==
Toronto scientist, professor Prabhat Jha argues that inexpensive recording of vital statistics in developing countries is the most effective means to improve global health and has outlined 5 options for expanding Cause of Death reporting.

"Despite the importance of tracking causes of death and the tradition since 1893 of standardisation of definitions and coding for causes of death in the International Classification of Diseases and Injuries (ICD), global assessments of causes of death are a major analytical challenge. Vital registration systems that include medical certification of the cause of death captured about 18.8 million deaths of an estimated annual total of 51.7 million deaths in 2005, which is the latest year for which the largest number of countries reported deaths from a vital registration system. Even for these deaths, the comparability of findings on the leading causes of death is affected by variation in certification skills among physicians, the diagnostic and pathological data available at the time of completing a death certificate, variations in medical culture in choosing the underlying cause, and legal and institutional frameworks for governing mortality reporting. For the remaining deaths that are not medically certified, many different data sources and diagnostic approaches must be used from surveillance systems, demographic research sites, surveys, censuses, disease registries, and police records to construct a consolidated picture of causes of death in various populations. Because of the variety of data sources and their associated biases, causes of death assessments are inherently uncertain and subject to vigorous debate."

== National agencies ==
=== United States ===
The recording of vital statistics in the United States is the responsibility of the states, not the federal government. According to the federal Centers for Disease Control:

In the United States, legal authority for the registration of these events [i.e., births, deaths, marriages, and divorces] resides individually with the 50 States, 2 cities (Washington, DC, and New York City), and 5 territories (Puerto Rico, the Virgin Islands, Guam, American Samoa, and the Commonwealth of the Northern Mariana Islands). These jurisdictions are responsible for maintaining registries of vital events and for issuing copies of birth, marriage, divorce, and death certificates.

Individuals seeking documentation of a particular birth, death, or marriage must contact the appropriate state, city, or territory office that holds those records.

The CDC's National Center for Health Statistics gathers statistics from the states, whose registration procedures may be centralized or decentralized. The CDC analyzes the data gathered to publish monthly and annual reports on such topics as infant mortality, family size, maternal and infant healthcare, fertility rates, death rates, and so on.

In addition, the Social Security Death Index provides nationwide birth and death records of deceased individuals. The Census Bureau publishes voluminous reports based on census data, including the American Community Survey, the U.S. Economic Census, and the Current Population Survey. However, the Census Bureau is forbidden by law from releasing personal information about individuals until 72 years after the information was gathered.

=== United Kingdom ===
The agency responsible for overseeing this system in the United Kingdom is the Office for National Statistics. Vital statistics for the UK can be found here.

=== Canada ===
The agency responsible for overseeing the vital statistics system in Canada is the Vital Statistics Program of the Centre for Population Health Data, a division of Statistics Canada. Vital statistics for Canada can be found here.

=== India ===
In India the vital statistics system is called Civil Registration System (CRS). This system is overseen by the vital statistics division of the Office of Registrar General and Census Commissioner of India. Vital statistics for India can be found at CRSORGI

== See also ==
- Birth certificate
- British Annals of Medicine, Pharmacy, Vital Statistics, and General Science
- Death certificate
- Vital record
- Civil registration and vital statistics
