= Walter Paget (illustrator) =

English illustrator (1862–1935)

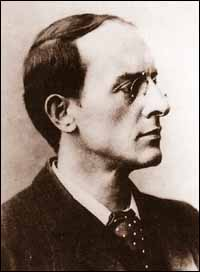
- Walter Paget
- Born: 26 January 1862; Clerkenwell, London, England
- Died: 29 January 1935 (aged 73); Fockbury, a small hamlet near Bromsgrove, Worcestershire, England
- Other name: Wal Paget
- Occupation: Illustrator
- Years active: 1882–1933
- Known for: The illustration of Henty's first ten juvenile novels
- Notable work: 120 illustrations for Cassell's Fine Art edition of Robinson Crusoe

Walter Stanley Paget (26 January 1862 – 29 January 1935) (Note: While many sources give Paget's year of birth as 1863, Kirkpatrick give his date of birth as 26 January 1862. The 1862 date is supported by registration of his birth in the first quarter of 1862, and his census returns.) was an English illustrator of the late 19th and early 20th century, who signed his work as "Wal Paget". Paget held a gold medal from the Royal Academy of Arts, and was the youngest of three brothers, Henry M. Paget (eldest) and Sidney Paget (middle brother), all illustrators.

== Early life ==
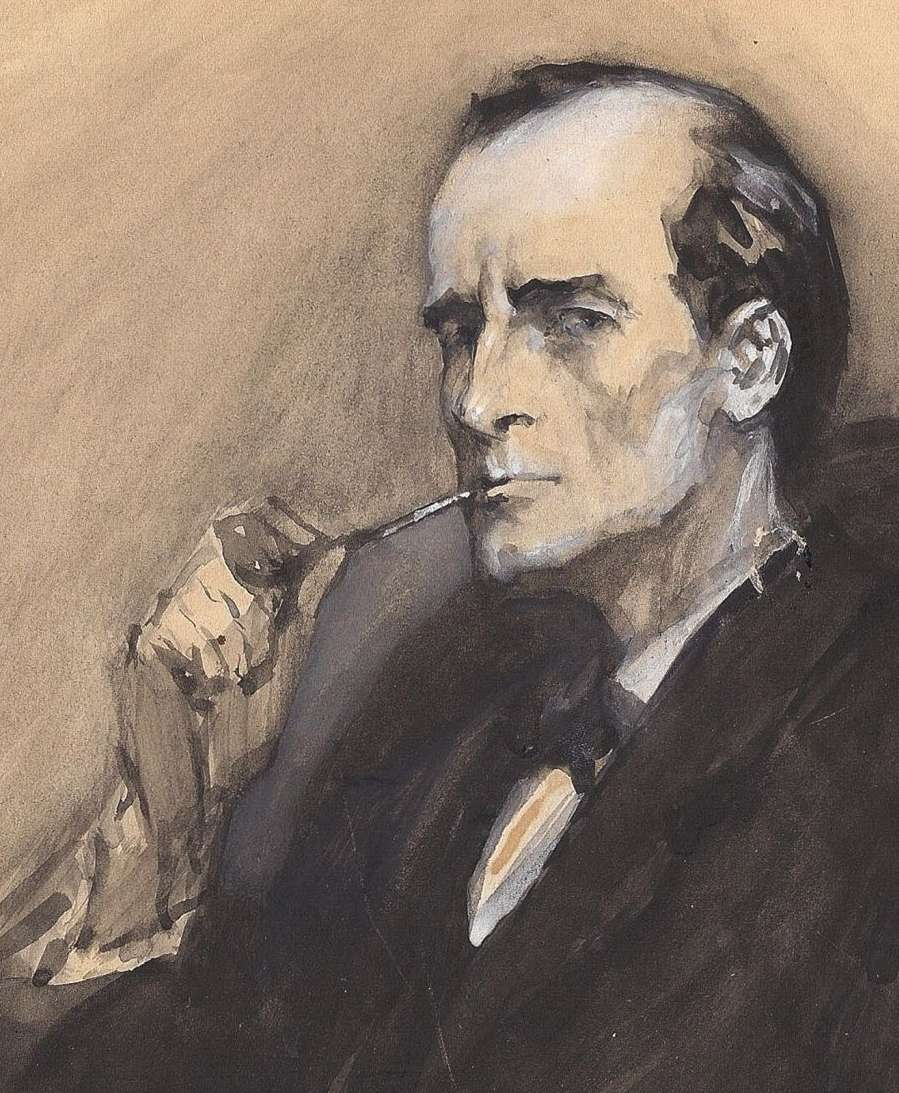
Portrait of Sherlock Holmes by Sidney Paget, said to be modelled on Walter Paget

Paget was the original choice of publisher George Newnes to illustrate Arthur Conan Doyle's Sherlock Holmes stories in The Strand Magazine, but through a misunderstanding the commission went to his brother, Sidney. When Sidney came to draw Sherlock Holmes, he is said to have used Walter as his model.

Paget served as a war correspondent for the Gordon Relief Expedition and provided interesting sketches of camp life which the Illustrated London News reproduced. He was at the British base of Suakim on the Red Sea and accompanied Sir Gerald Graham's army to Tamai in 1884.

Walter Paget provided illustrations for numerous authors of the era, including the 1910 edition of Charles and Mary Lamb's Tales from Shakespeare, and Doyle's 1913 Holmes short story, "The Adventure of the Dying Detective", in The Strand Magazine. He illustrated adventure novels by G. A. Henty, F. S. Brereton and Herbert Strang, among others. Paget was an occasional exhibitor. (Note: Paget exhibited from 1880 as follows: five works at the Grosvenor Gallery, one work at the Walker Art Gallery, Liverpool, two works at the Manchester City Art Gallery, three works at the New Gallery, five works at the Royal Academy, one work at the Royal Society of British Artists, and one work at the Royal Institute of Oil Painters.)

== Authors illustrated ==
Among the authors whose work was illustrated by Walter Paget were the following (based on the list by Kirkpatrick).

- Alfred Barrett (1870–1945), Alfred Wilson Barrett, an English editor and novelist
- Tom Bevan (1868–1938), a British author of boys' adventure fiction.
- R. D. Blackmore (1825–1900), an English novelist now best remembered for Lorna Doone.
- Joseph Bowes (1852–1928), an Australian Methodist cleric who wrote juvenile fiction, mostly with Australian themes.
- Alfred John Church (1829–1912), a Classical Scholar who wrote books on the Romans and Greeks, as well as other historical topics.
- Arthur O. Cooke (1867–1932), a prolific author of books for children, especially non-fiction, on nature, geography, history etc.
- E. E. Cowper (c. 1859 – 1933), Edith Eliza Cowper, a prolific English author of juvenile fiction, much of which was published by the SPCK, who had ten children by Frank Cowper, yachtsman and author, from whom she separated shortly after the last of her children was born. (Note: The Census returns show that she lived with her children, apart from her husband.)
- H. B. Davidson (1898–1998), Helene Beatrice Davidson, who wrote over two dozen books in the 1920s and 1930s, mostly about Girl Guides and Brownies, with a few featuring Boy Scouts.
- Daniel Defoe (c. 1659 – 1731), who wrote Robinson Crusoe and A Journal of the Plague Year among other works.
- Evelyn Everett-Green (1856–1932), who moved from pious stories for children, through historical romances, to adult romances under a range of pseudonyms.
- George Manville Fenn (1831–1909), a prolific author of fiction for young adults.
- Charles Alan Fyffe (1845–1892), an English historian and journalist.
- H. Rider Haggard (1856–1925), an English novelist who wrote King Solomon's Mines.
- Bret Harte (1836–1902), an American short-story writer and poet.
- Herbert Hayens (1861–1944), who wrote juvenile fiction and school-books
- G. A. Henty (1832–1902), a prolific writer of boys' adventure fiction, often set in a historical context, who had himself served in the military and been a war correspondent. Paget illustrated the first editions of ten Henty novels between 1893 and 1904.
- Ascott R. Hope (1846–1927), a prolific author of children's books, especially school stories, and of Black's Guides.
- Anna Jameson (1794–1860), Anna Brownell Jameson, an Anglo-Irish art historian and writer on a range of topics.
- William Johnston
- David Ker (1841–1914), an English journalist, traveller, soldier, and author of juvenile fiction, who based the action in his stories on his own hair-raising experiences.
- Henry Kingsley (1830–1876), an English novelist, editor, and war correspondent, a brother to Charles Kingsley.
- Charles and Mary Lamb (1775–1834), who wrote Tales From Shakespeare for children.
- Edward Bulwer Lytton (1803–1873), Edward George Earle Lytton Bulwer-Lytton, 1st Baron Lytton, an English politician and Writer who first used the opening line It was a dark and stormy night.
- Bessie Marchant (1862–1941), who wrote adventure fiction featuring young female heroines, sometimes used the pseudonym Bessie Comfort.
- Frederick Marryat (1792–1848), a Royal Navy officer who wrote adventure books for children.
- L. T. Meade (1844–1914), Elizabeth Thomasina Meade Smith, a prolific Irish writer of stories for girls.
- Dorothea Moore (1881–1993), an English actress, wartime nurse's aide, and the author of more than sixty works of juvenile fiction including both historical fiction and school stories.
- Alexander Pope (1688–1744), regarded as one of the greatest English poets, best known for The Rape of the Lock.
- Walter Scott (1771–1832), the Scottish historical novelist, poet, and historian who wrote Ivanhoe.
- R. L. Stevenson (1850–1894), the Scottish poet and novelist who wrote Treasure Island and other adventure fiction.
- Herbert Strang (1866–1958), a pair of writers producing adventure fiction for boys, both historical and modern-day.
- William Makepeace Thackeray (1811–1863), a British novelist, author and illustrator born in India, best known for Vanity Fair.
- Lucy L. Weedon (1862–1939), a prolific author of stories for small children and simplified accounts of stories from Dickens, the Bible etc.
- Percy Westerman (1875–1959), a prolific author of boys' adventure fiction, many with military and naval themes.
- Charlotte Mary Yonge (1823–1901), novelist with a strong religious emphasis.

== The fine art edition of Robinson Crusoe ==
In late 1890 Cassell's began advertising for a new fine-art edition of Robinson Crusoe illustrated by Paget. It was to be in 13 monthly parts, with a price of six pence each, with the first part available on 18 December 1890. While the original advertisement does not give the number of the illustrations, later advertisements stated that the edition would have upwards of 100 illustrations by Paget. Presumably Paget was still drawing the illustrations as the exact number was not stated.

The work was very well received by reviewers:

- "Messrs. Cassell and Co. have just begun the issue in monthly parts of a new fine-art edition of Robinson Crusoe. . . . which has a new set illustrations by Mr. Walter Paget, reproduced by one of the photographic processes which give the artists’ own work in simile. The process work in the first number the new edition is of the very best. . ." – Norwich Mercury
- ". . . it would be impossible to speak too highly of the illustrations." – Buchan Observer and East Aberdeenshire Advertiser
- "The printing and the illustrations, all of which are new, far surpass any former edition." – Dover Express
- "The edition, which is being issued in sixpenny parts, is one which may heartily commended, for in it the best literature . . . and the best art are fitly wedded." – Peterhead Sentinel and General Advertiser for Buchan District
- "Messrs. Cassell and Co. are now publishing monthly parts a tine-art edition of "Robinson Crusoe." Upwards of one hundred beautiful illustrations, by Mr. Walter Paget, adorn the work. In all probability is the most artistic publication of Defoe's celebrated work that has ever issued from the British press." – Preston Herald
- "The great feature of the work, which will be completed in about 13 parts, is the excellence of the original drawings prepared by Mr. Walter Paget expressly to illustrate this new edition. Not only are the drawings admirable works of art, but they faithfully represent the dresses and other characteristics of Crusoe's time. . ." – Salisbury and Winchester Journal
- "Cassell's new issue of Robinson Crusoe will for when complete one of the best editions of DeFoe's celegrated story extant. It is beautifully illustrated by Walter Paget." – Monmouthshire Beacon
- "Messrs. Cassell's new fine art edition of "Robinson Cruse is nearing completion. Mr Walter Paget's drawings are often very beautiful." – Liverpool Mercury
- "Messrs Cassell's idea of issuing a fine-art edition of Robinson Crusoe in monthly numbers was a good one, and in its complete form it makes a very handsome volume. The outstanding feature of the work the large number of beautiful engravings, many of them full-page, with which Walter Pages has illustrated the letterpress. They are admirably drawn and are meritorious works of art." – Dundee Advertiser (Note: With thirteen monthly instalments, the last one should have been issued in December, but it is clear from this review that the last installment was issued in November 1891.)

Just as the publication of the fine-art Robinson Crusoe in installments was coming to an end, Cassell's published it as a single volume book. This was equally well received.

- "This is a really handsome book. – well printed, brightly bound, and undeniably very happy in its illustrations, which are of good quality as they are numerous. We do not remember to have seen Robinson Crusoe so well treated from a pictorial point of view. Mr. Paget has imagination, and he has style." – The Globe
- "The illustration are admirable, and altogether we have no doubt that this is the most handsome edition of Defoe's immortal story ever issued from the press." – Illustrated Sporting and Dramatic News
- ". . . surely no boys ever had a more beautiful or enjoyable edition that the which has been issued by Messrs. Cassell, with illustration by Walter Paget, These are evidently the result of very careful study, but they have what no study only could give, the life and spirit that comes from quick dramatic sympathy. They are of fine-art quality, and are delicately and beautifully executed. Defoe's entrancing story has never appeared in so attractive a guise." – Birmingham Daily Post
- ". . . to Mr. Walter Paget, whose hundred and twenty drawings have been admirably done. Composition, character, draughtsmanship of both figures and landscape, and even petty details, leave nothing to be desired; the artist, whilst preserving the old traditions respecting Crusoe himself, has given historical accuracy of dress, race, and accessories. . ." – St James's Gazette

=== Illustrations for Robinson Crusoe ===
The following illustrations are the fourteen full page illustrations. The book had 120 in total, and many of the others are half-page or larger. All show the same scrupulous care. The book is available on-line at The British Library. The final illustration shown is a cover for the book in installments. (Note: This is not the original publication in installments, as it was prices at sixpence and not threepence as in this example, and the total number of illustrations was not known when the first installment was originally published.)

Illustration by Walter Paget for fine-art Cassell edition (1891) of Robinson Crusoe – by courtesy of British Library

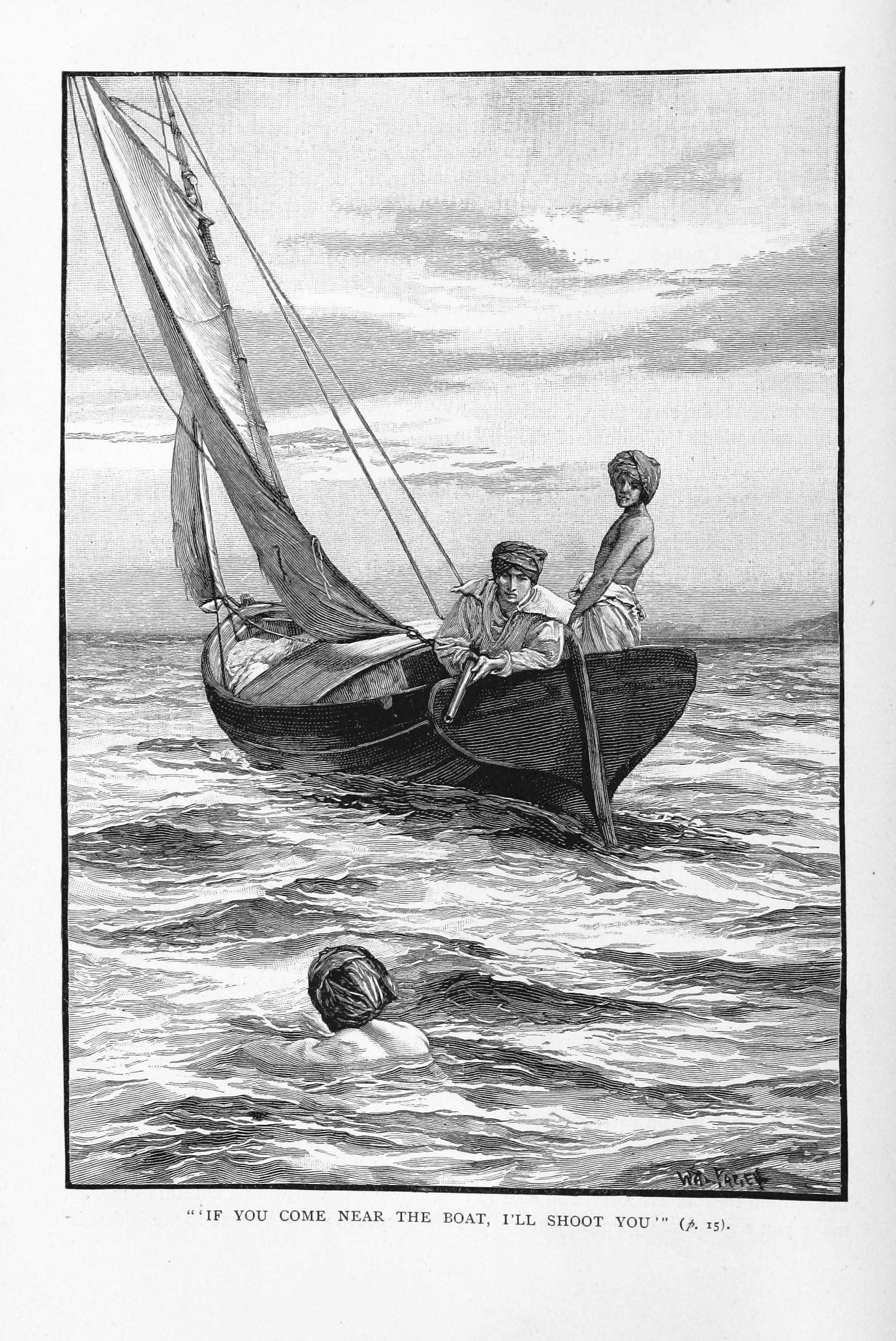
Page 11

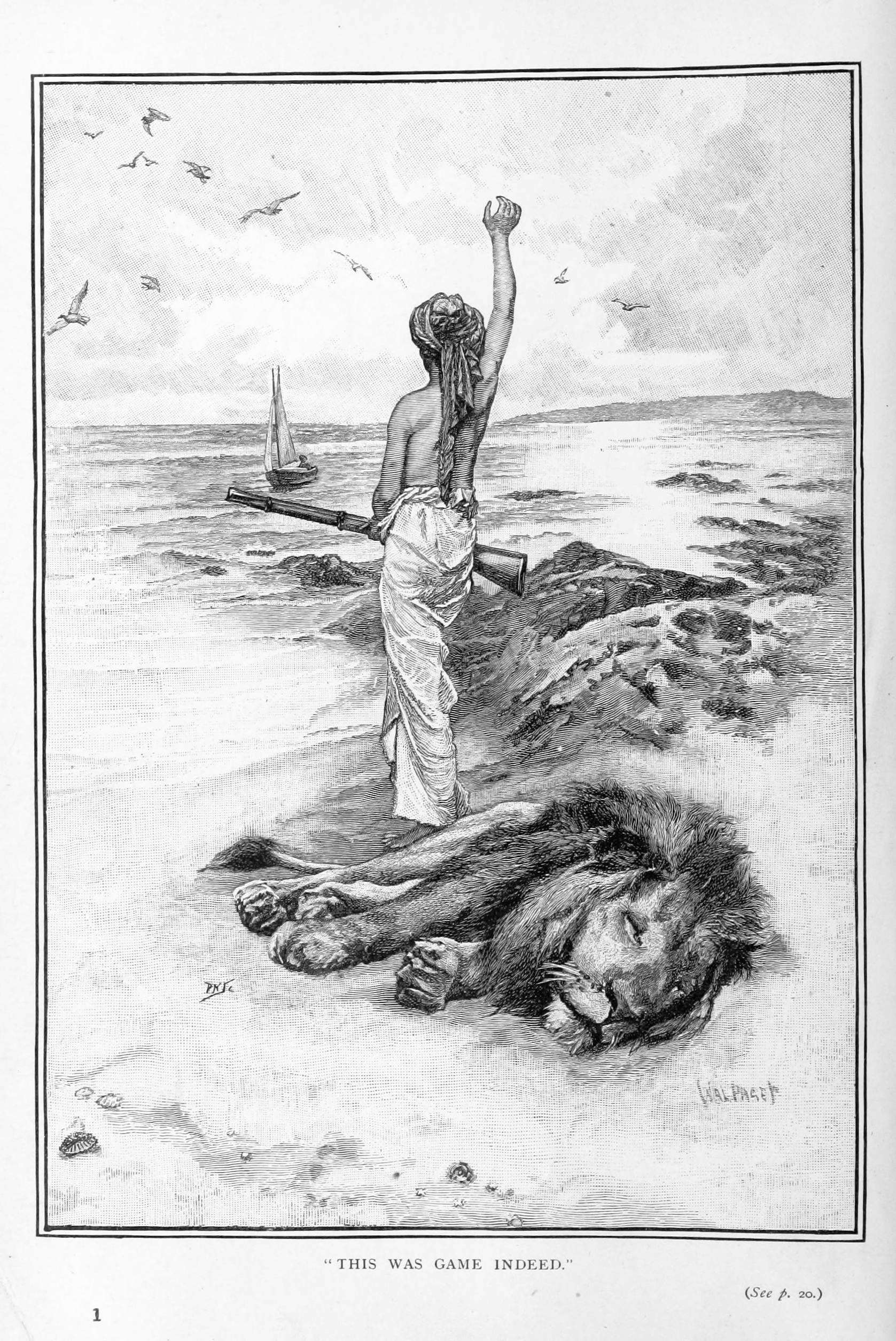
Page 20

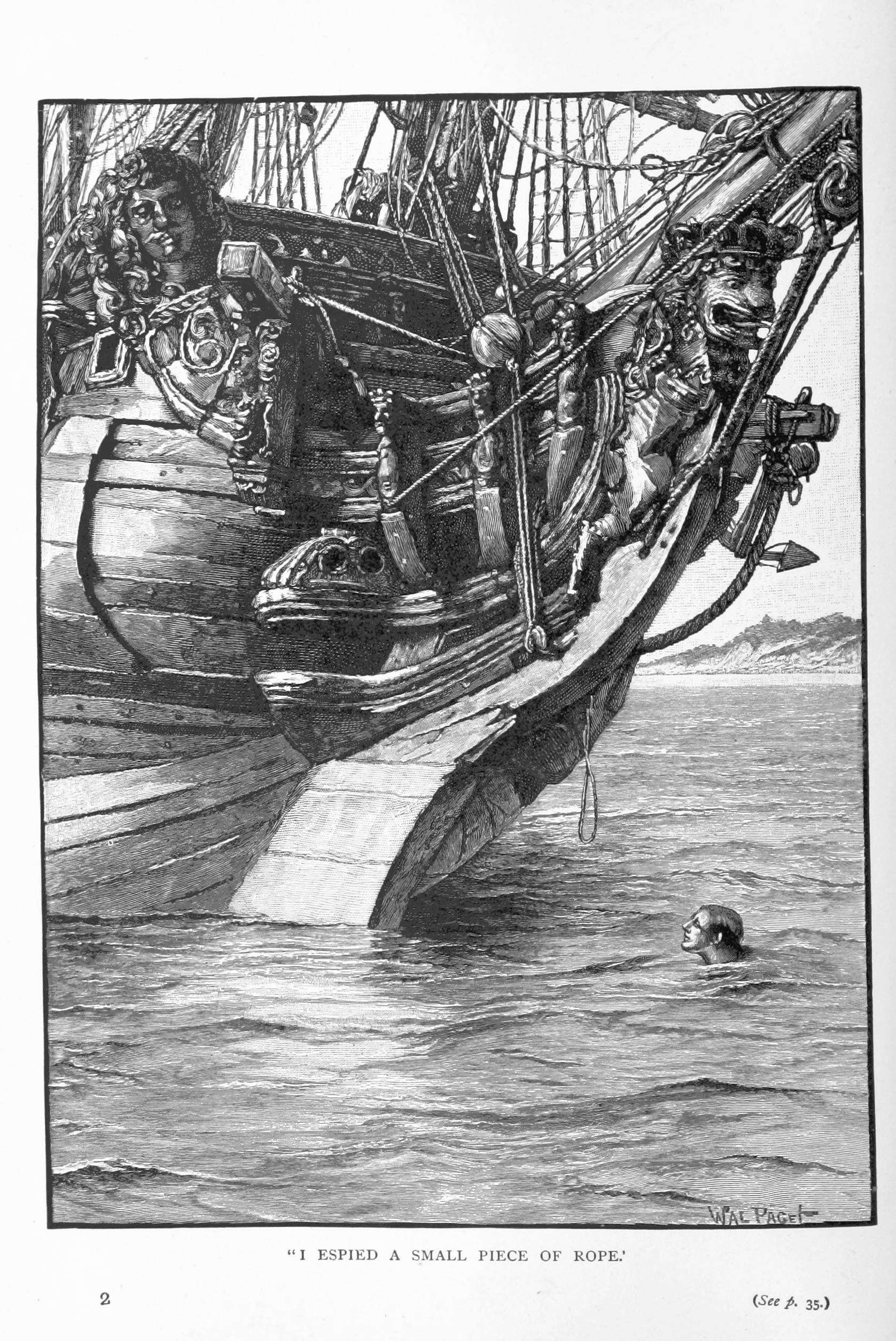
Page 35

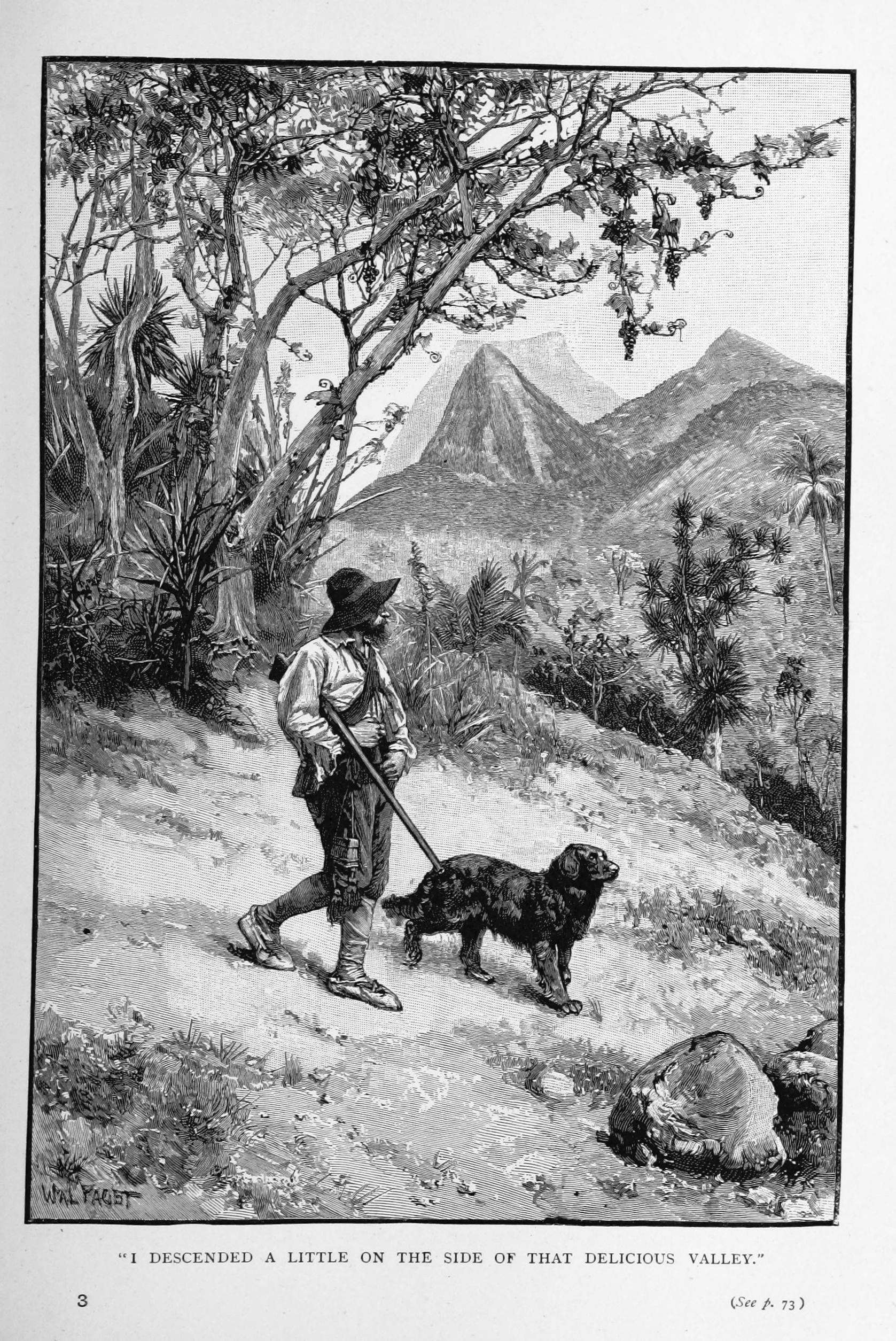
Page 73

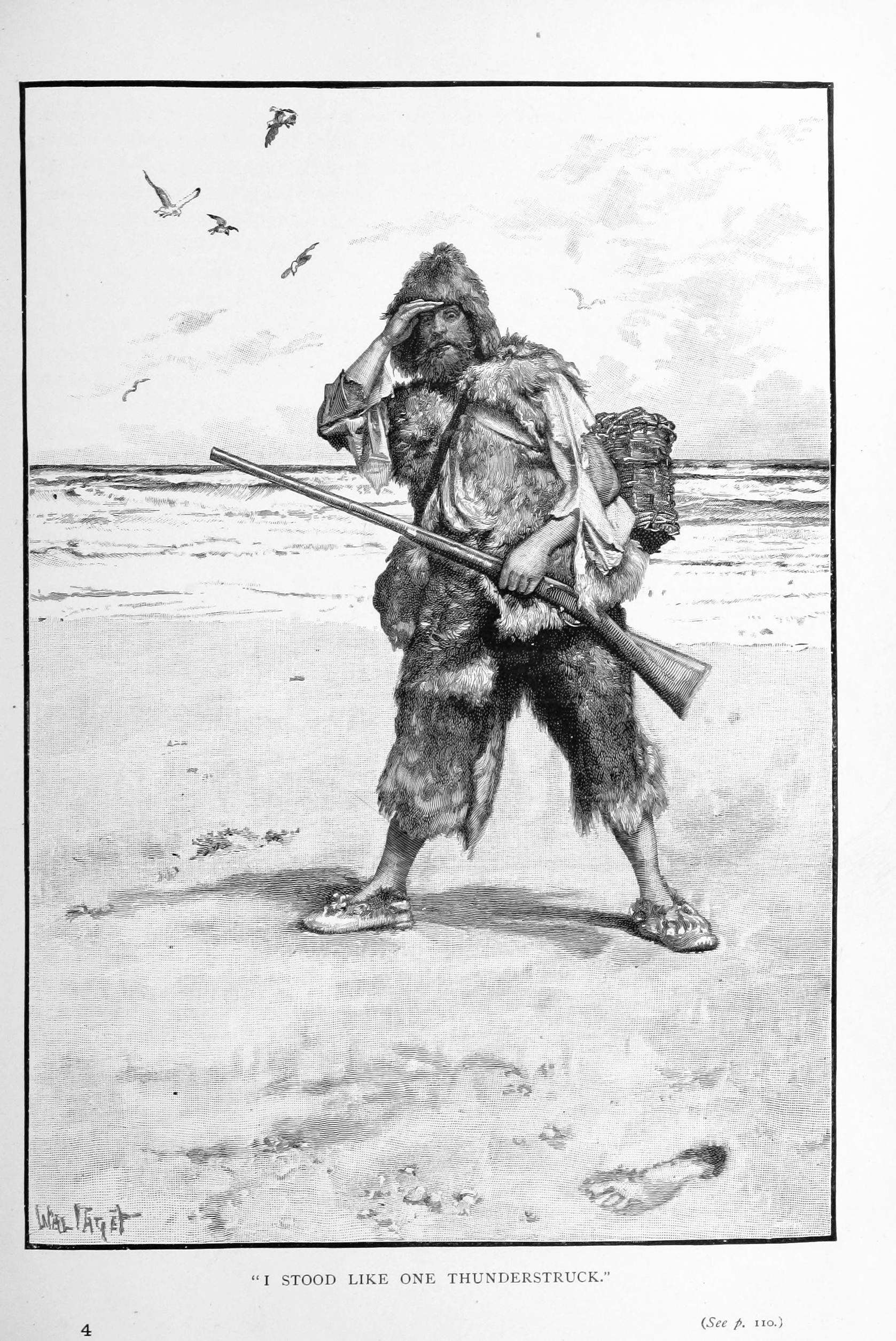
Page 110

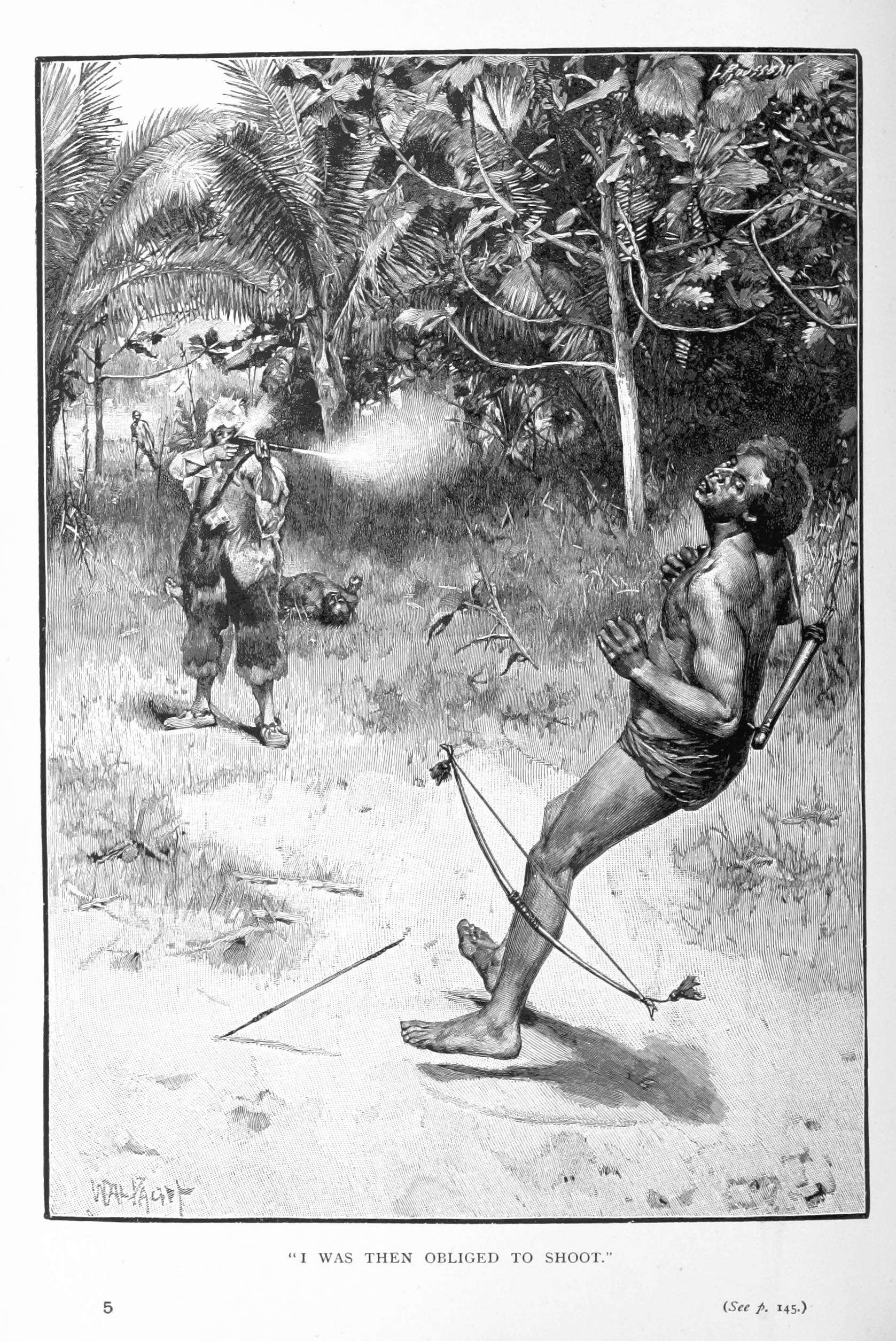
Page 145

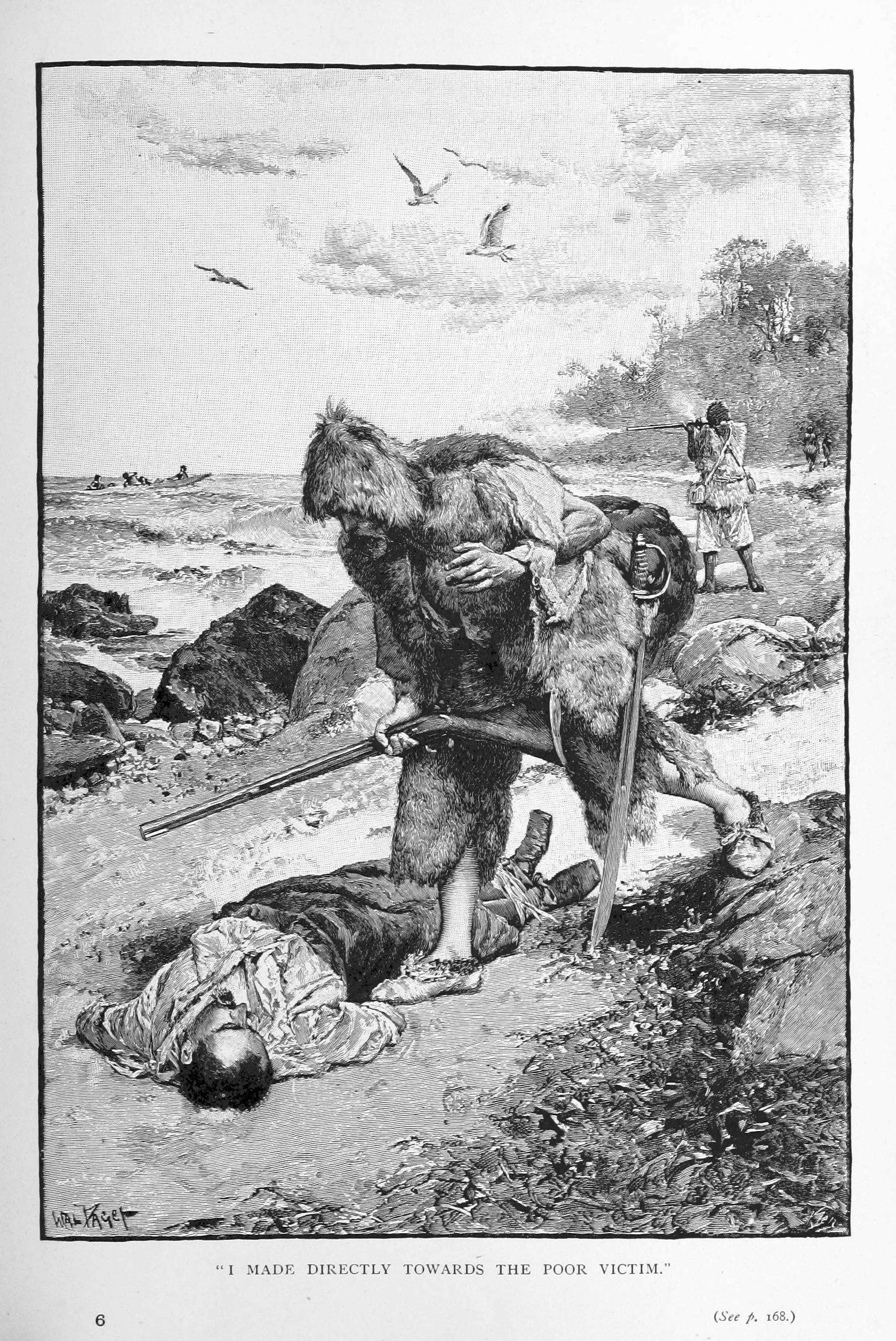
Page 168

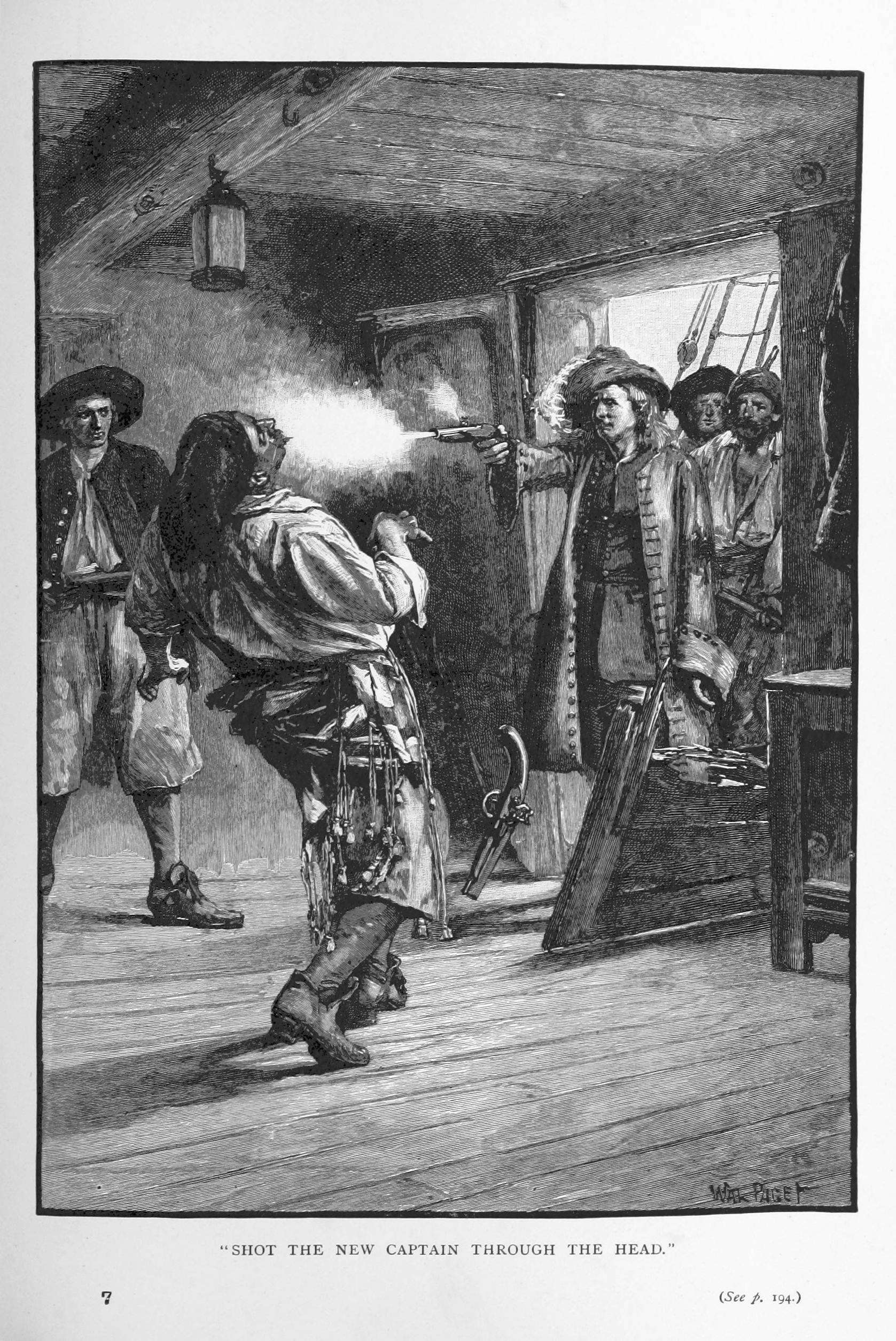
Page 194

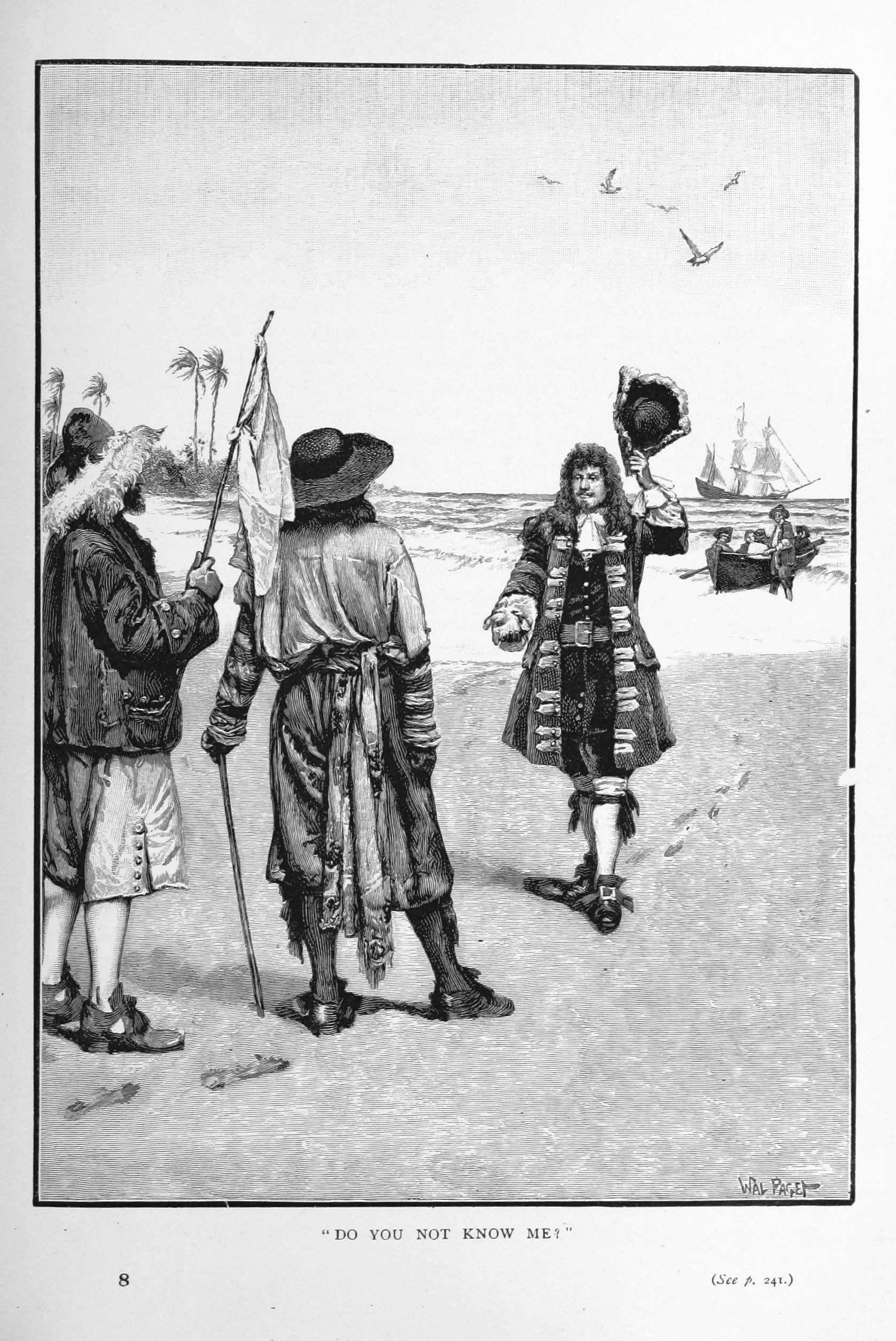
Page 241

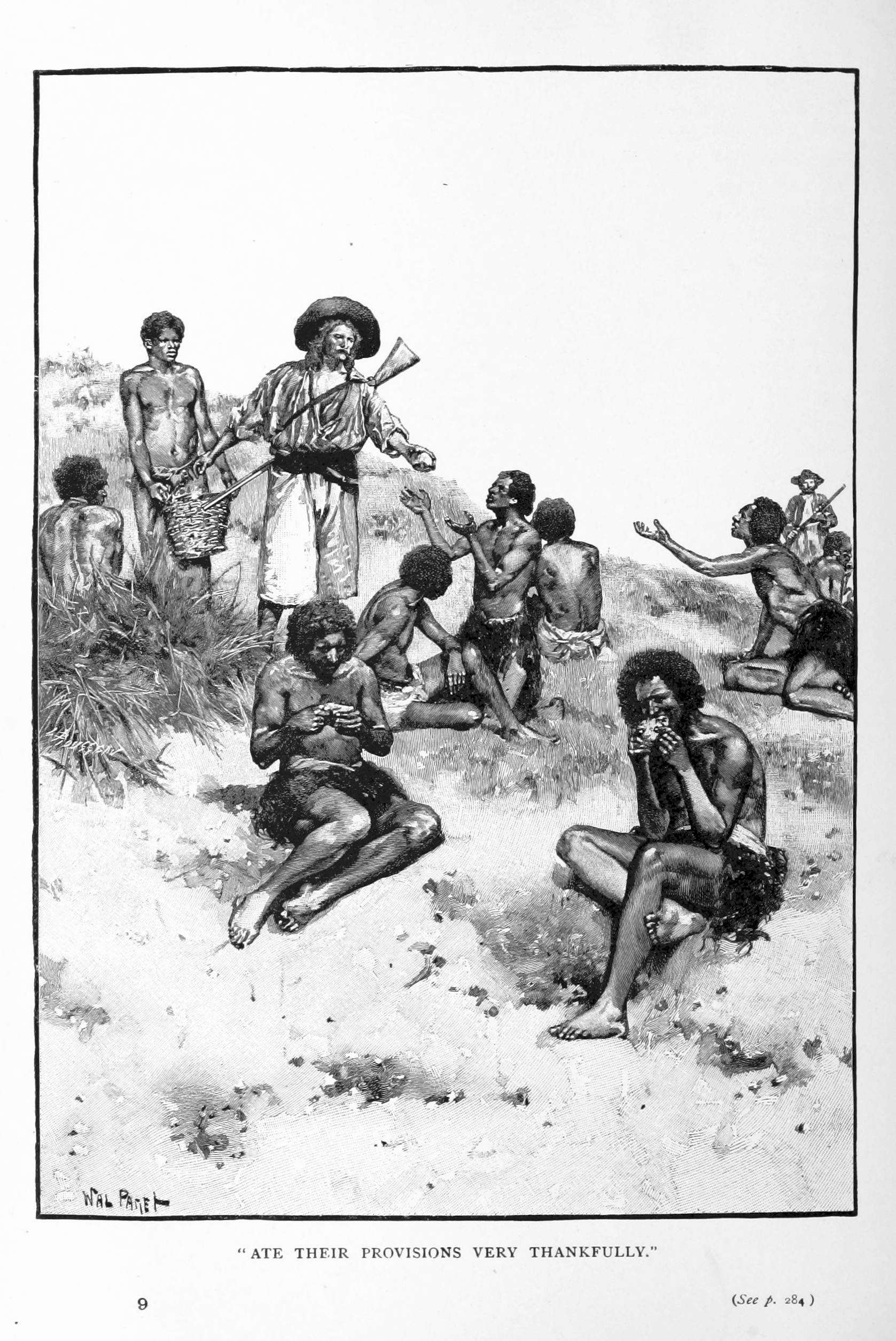
Page 284

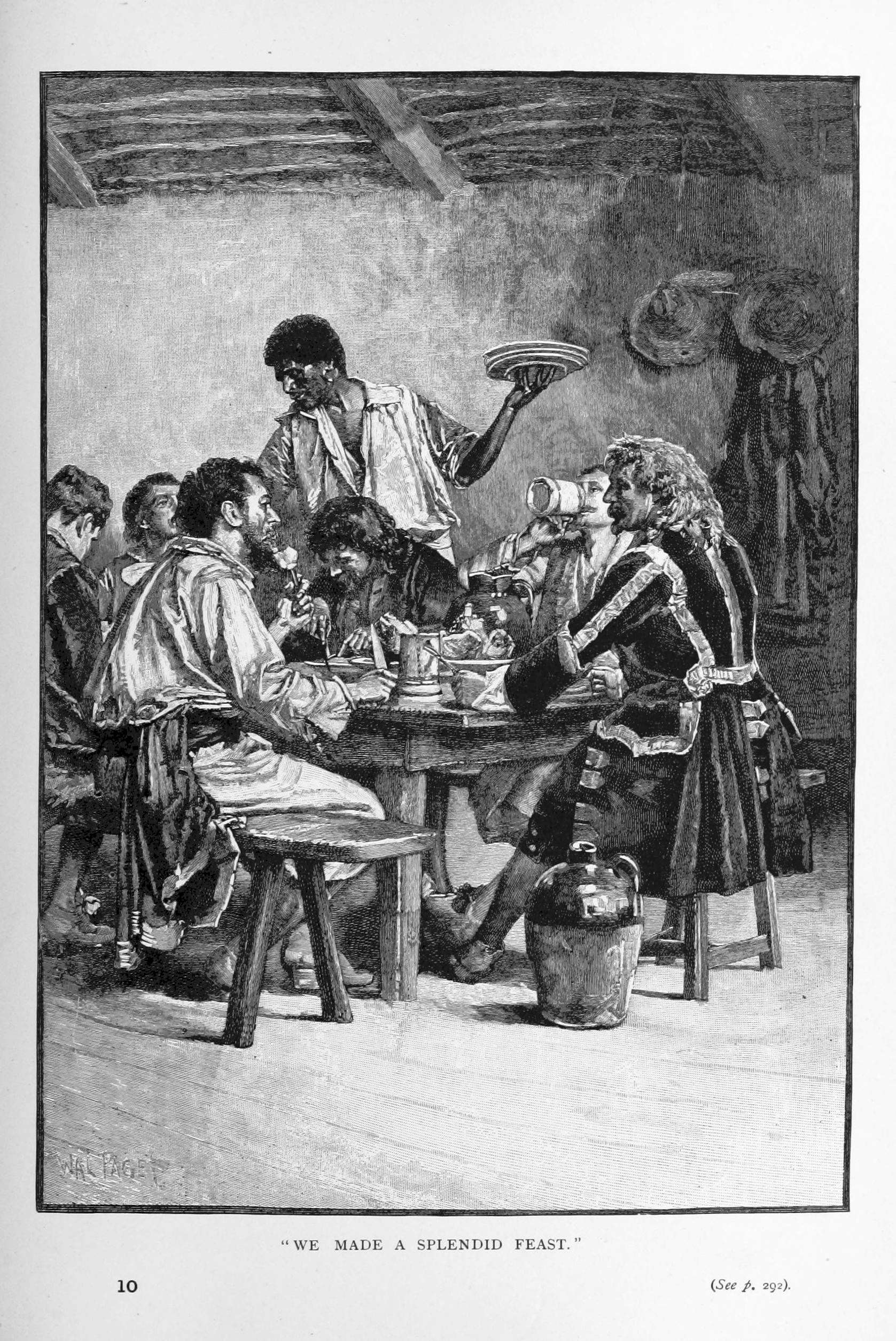
Page 292

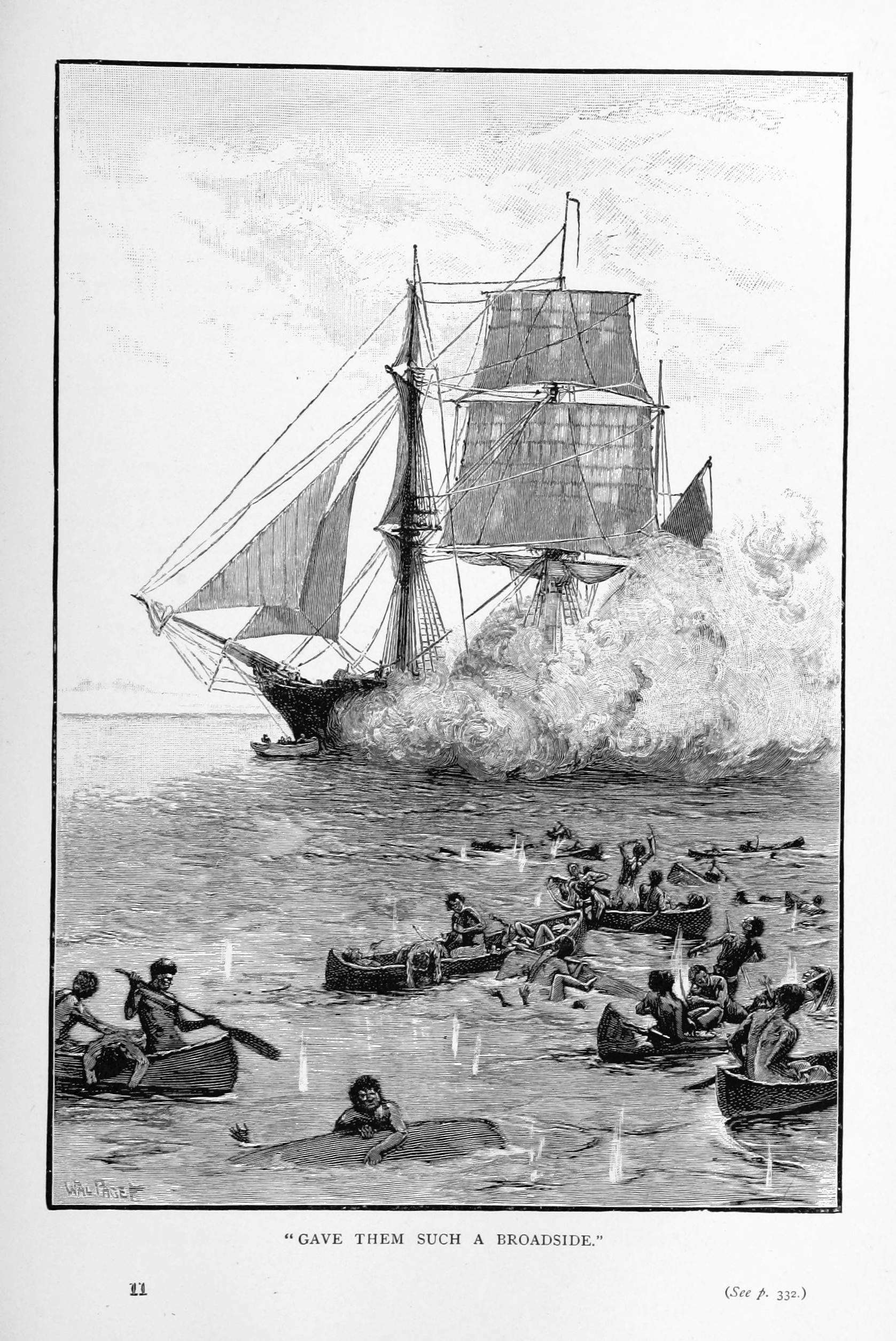
Page 332

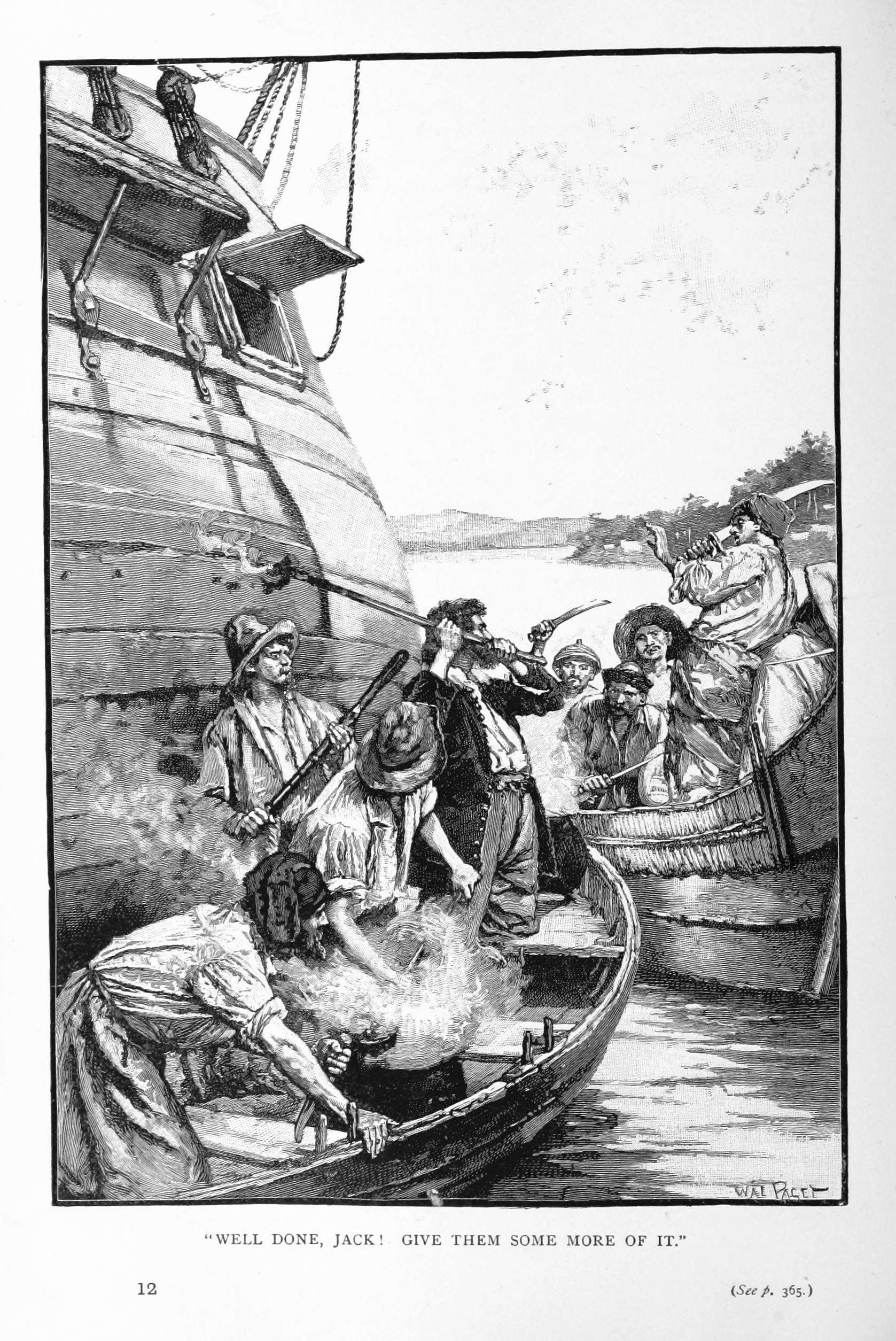
Page 365

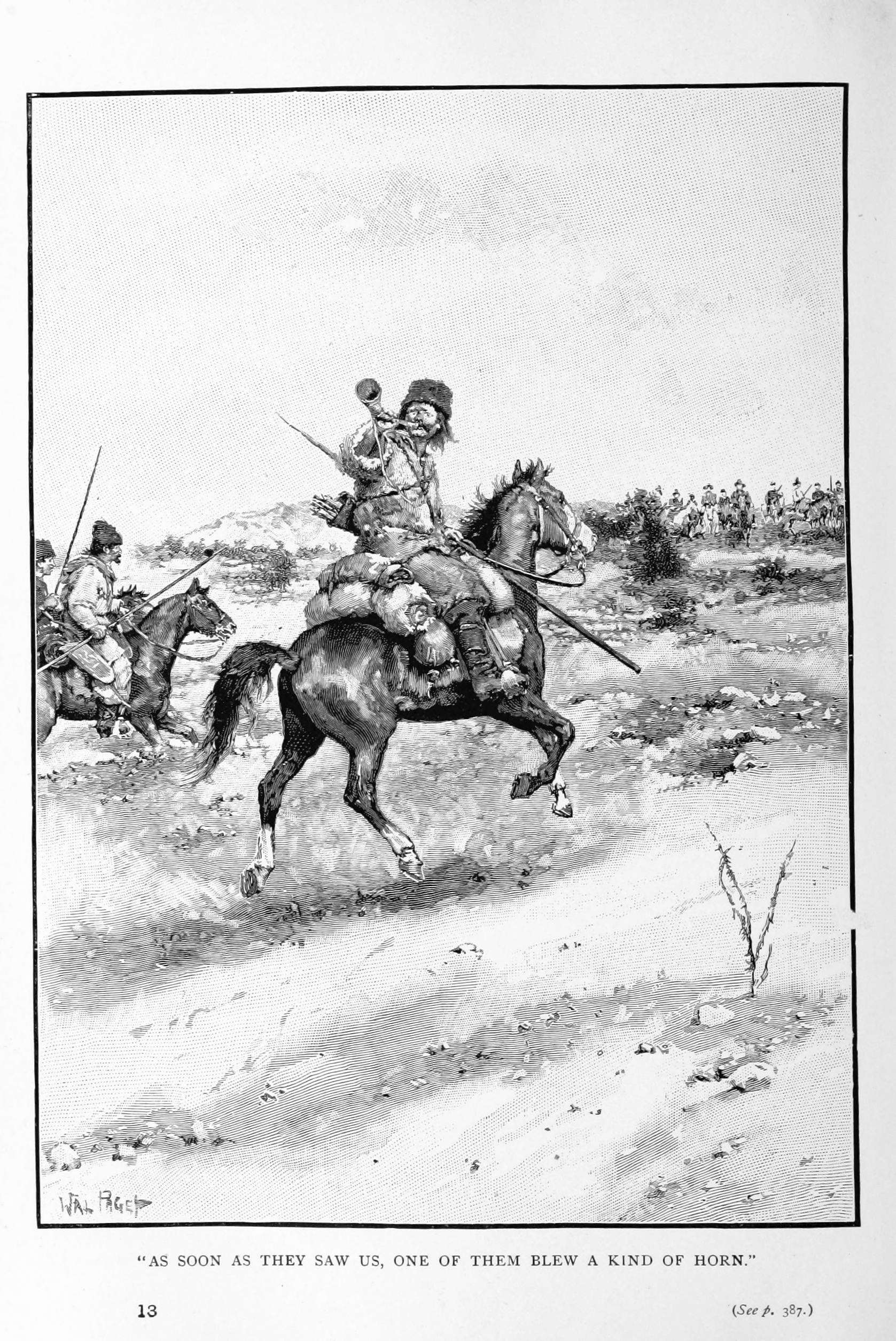
Page 387

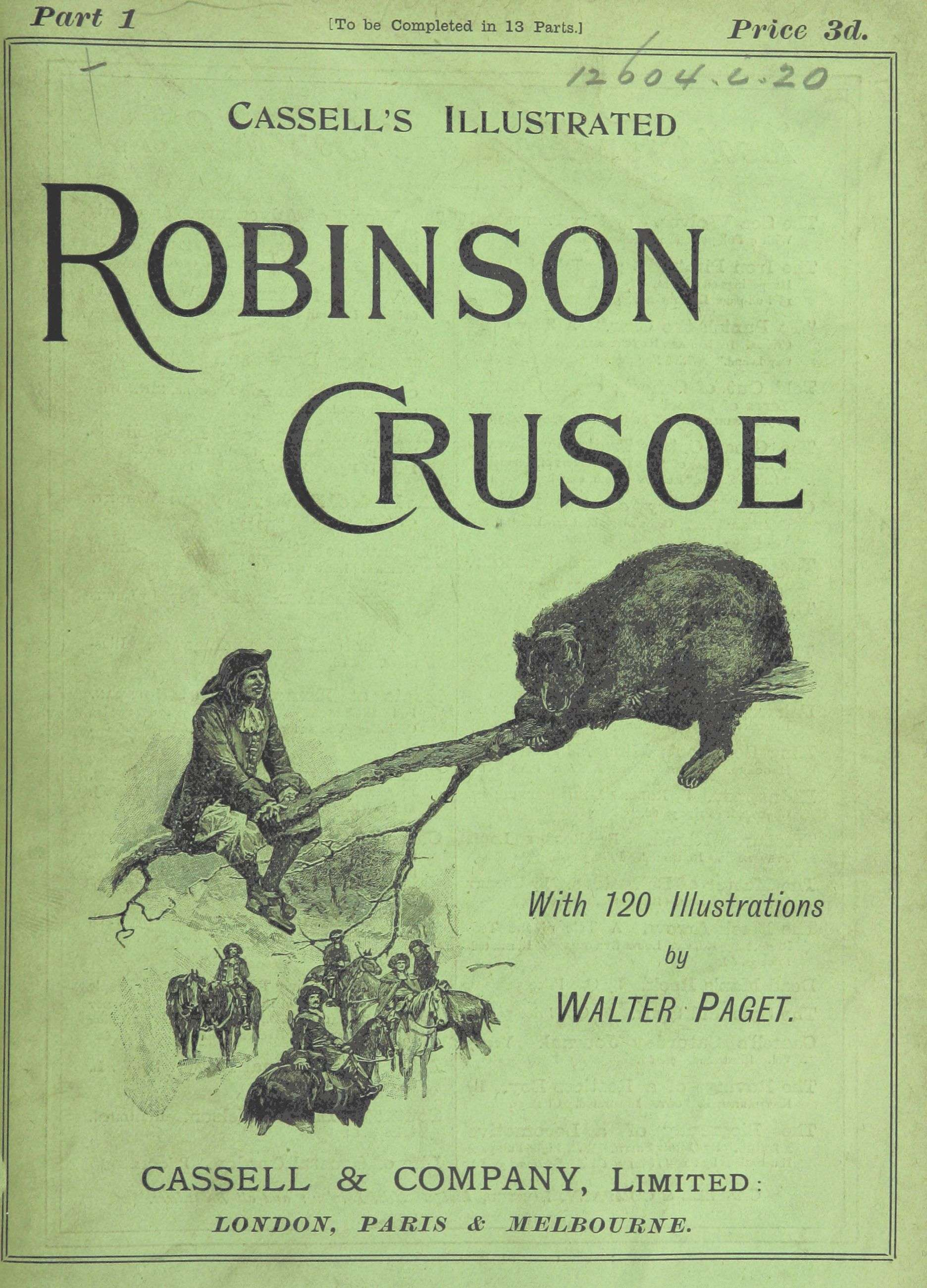
Cover for a later reissue of the book in installments

== Later life ==
Paget did relatively little work after 1921, illustrating mostly children's books on life in different countries, and then illustrating less than over every two years on average. Paget moved to Burnham-on-Crouch, Essex, England. However, it was not there but at Fockbury, (Note: Fockbury is the birth place of poet and scholar A. E. Housman) a small hamlet near Bromsgrove in Worcestershire that he died on 29 January 1935.
