= Sidney Paget =

English illustrator (1860–1908)

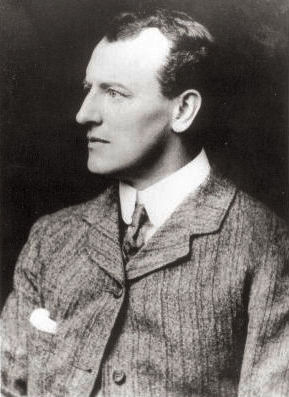
- Paget in c. 1890
- Born: Sidney Edward Paget; 4 October 1860; Clerkenwell, London, England
- Died: 28 January 1908 (aged 47); Margate, Kent, England
- Notable work: The Strand Magazine illustrations
- Spouse: Edith Hounsfield (m. 1893)
- Children: 6
- Family: Walter, Henry (brothers)

Sidney Edward Paget (/ˈpædʒɪt/; 4 October 1860 – 28 January 1908) was an English illustrator best known for his illustrations that accompanied Arthur Conan Doyle's Sherlock Holmes stories in The Strand Magazine.

== Life ==
Sidney Paget was the fifth of nine children born to Robert Paget, the vestry clerk of St. James and St. John in Clerkenwell, and Martha Paget (née Clarke), a music professor. In 1881 Paget entered the Royal Academy Schools. Here he befriended Alfred Morris Butler, an architecture student who may have become the model for Paget's illustrations of Dr. John Watson. Between 1879 and 1905 Paget contributed eighteen paintings, including nine portraits, to the Royal Academy exhibitions.

Paget's drawings appeared in the Strand Magazine, the Pictorial World, The Sphere, The Graphic, The Illustrated London News, and The Pall Mall Magazine, and his work became well known in both the United Kingdom and United States. He provided illustrations for Arthur Morrison's Martin Hewitt detective stories and Arthur Conan Doyle's Sherlock Holmes work, doing much to popularise both series.

On 1 June 1893, Sidney Paget married Edith Hounsfield (1865 – 1942 or 1932?), daughter of William Hounsfield, a farmer. They had four daughters and two sons together: Leslie Robert (1894–1942); Winifred (1896); Edith Muriel (1897); Evelyn Mereoah (1899); Beryl May (1902–1955) and John L. Paget.

Sidney Paget died in Margate on 28 January 1908, at age 47, after suffering from a painful chest complaint for the last few years of his life. According to his death certificate, the cause of death was "Mediastinal tumour, 3 years, exhaustion". Mediastinal tumours are growths that form in the central chest; as they grow, they increasingly constrict the lungs. The condition is rare, with unknown causes, and in the early twentieth century led to a painful and certain death.

Paget was buried in East Finchley Cemetery. Two brothers, H.M. (Henry Marriott) Paget (1856–1936) and Wal (Walter Stanley) Paget (1862–1935) were also successful portraitists and illustrators.

== The Strand illustrations ==
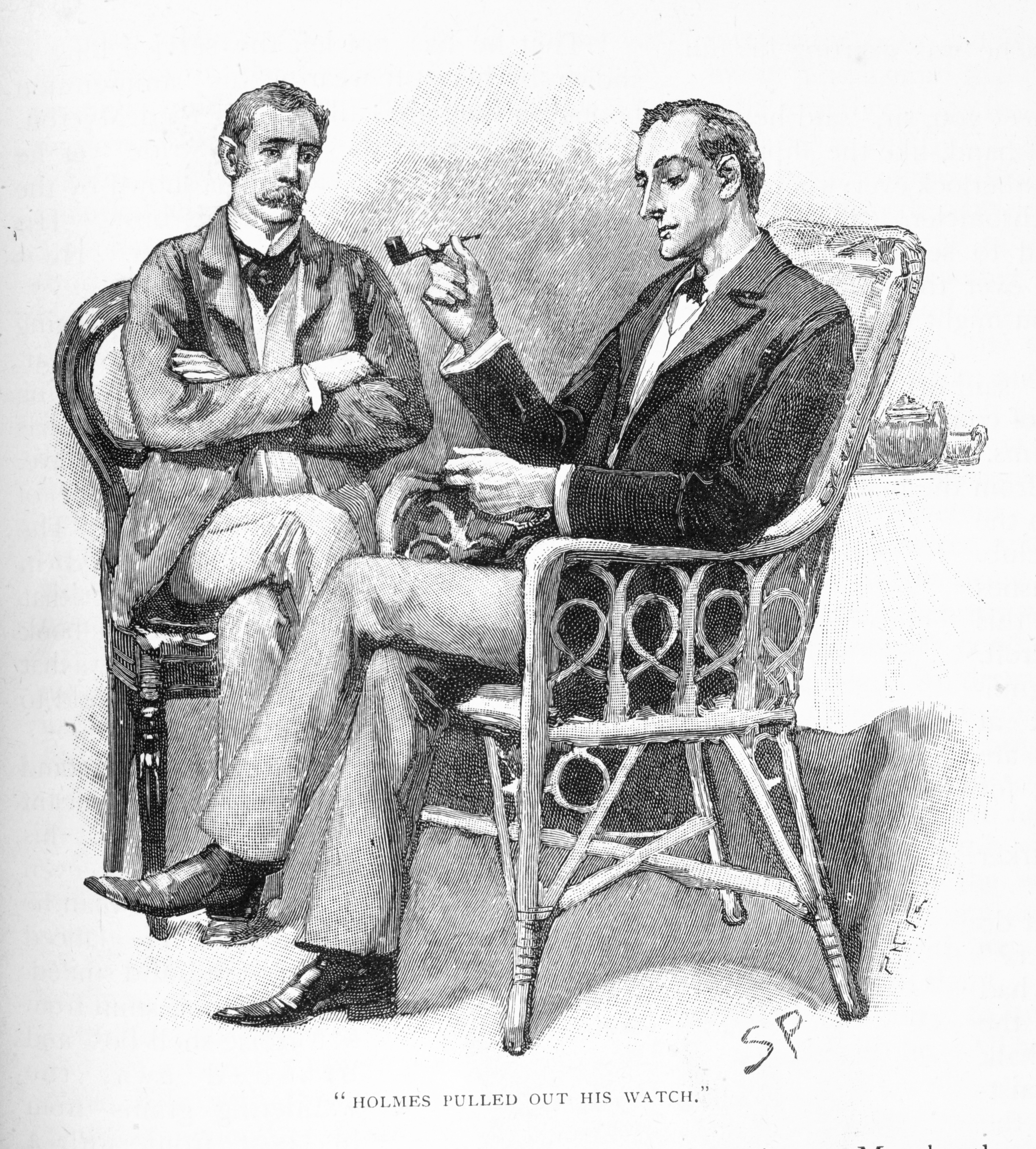
A Paget depiction of Sherlock Holmes (right) and Dr. Watson from "The Adventure of the Greek Interpreter" (1893)

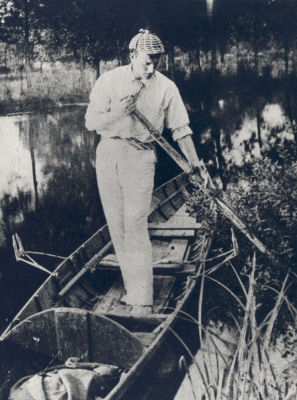
Paget wearing a deerstalker cap

Paget is best remembered as the creator of the popular image of Sherlock Holmes from the original publication of Conan Doyle's stories in The Strand Magazine. He was originally hired to illustrate The Adventures of Sherlock Holmes, a series of twelve short stories that ran from July 1891 through June 1892.

In 1893, Paget illustrated The Memoirs of Sherlock Holmes, published in The Strand as further episodes of the Adventures. When Sir Arthur Conan Doyle revived the Sherlock Holmes series with The Hound of the Baskervilles, serialised in The Strand in 1901–1902, he specifically requested that Paget be the illustrator. Paget went on to illustrate another short story series, The Return of Sherlock Holmes, in 1903–1904. In all, he illustrated one Holmes novel and 37 Holmes short stories. His illustrations have influenced interpretations of the detective in fiction, film and drama.

The Strand became one of Great Britain's most famous fiction magazines, with the Holmes series its most popular feature. As Holmes' popularity grew, Paget's illustrations became larger and more elaborate. Beginning with "The Adventure of the Final Problem" in 1893, almost every Holmes story in The Strand featured a full-page illustration as well as many smaller ones.

Paget was the first to give Holmes his deerstalker cap and Inverness cape – details never mentioned in the stories and novels. The cap and cape first appear in an illustration for "The Boscombe Valley Mystery" in 1891 and reappear in "The Adventure of Silver Blaze" in 1893; they also appear in a few illustrations from The Return of Sherlock Holmes. (The curved calabash pipe was added by the stage actor William Gillette.)

Altogether, Paget did some 356 published drawings for the Sherlock Holmes series. His depictions of Holmes became iconic and other illustrators found themselves compelled to imitate his style in their own depictions of Holmes.

A complete set of The Strand issues featuring the illustrated Sherlock Holmes tales is one of the rarest and most expensive collector's items in publishing history. Paget's original 6.75 × 10.5-inch drawing of "Holmes and Moriarty in Mortal Combat at the Edge of the Reichenbach Falls" was sold by Sotheby's in New York on 16 November 2004 for $220,800.

Legend holds that the publishers of The Strand hired Paget accidentally when he mistakenly responded to a letter of commission intended for his younger brother Walter, but a 2019 paper published in the Baker Street Journal found no evidence for this story and much against it. Another commonly held belief – that Paget modeled his depiction of Holmes on that of Walter – was denied by their brother Henry Marriott Paget.
