= Civil Registration System (India) =

Indian vital statistics recording system

Agency overview
- Formed: 1969; 56 years ago
- Jurisdiction: Government of India
- Agency executive: Registrar General of India
- Parent department: Ministry of Home Affairs
- Website: crsorgi.gov.in

Civil Registration System or CRS in India is the unified process of continuous, permanent, compulsory and universal recording of the vital events (birth, deaths, stillbirths) and characteristics thereof. The data generated through CRS is essential for socio-economic planning.

crsorgi.gov.in is a dedicated website for birth and death recording in India.

== History ==
The Civil Registration System (CRS) in India has a long story dating back to middle of 19th century. A central Births1974, Deaths, and Marriages registration bill was passed in 1886 to allow consensual registrations across British India. The Registration of Births and Deaths Act (RBD) was passed in 1969 after independence to improve consistency and comparability in the recording of births and deaths throughout the nation.

== Website ==
- official website
