= Henry M. Paget =

British painter and illustrator

Henry Marriott Paget
- Born: 31 December 1857; Clerkenwell, London, England
- Died: 27 March 1936 (aged 78); Hampstead, London, England
- Known for: Portraits and illustrations of historic events

Henry Marriott Paget RBA (1856–1936) was a British painter and illustrator, who signed his work "HMP".

Paget, along with his brothers, Sidney Paget and Walter Paget, provided illustrations for works by Arthur Conan Doyle.

== Work ==
=== Newspaper illustration ===
Illustrated papers like the Illustrated London News often had an artist rework the foreign correspondent's material to produce a drawing from which the engraving could be prepared. This was particularly the case with rough sketches, and initially with photographs. Paget prepared sketches and photographs from the Greco-Turkish War (1897) and the Boer War by war-correspondents for publication. Hodgson notes that almost all the illustrations published by The Sphere during the Boer War were redrawn in London.

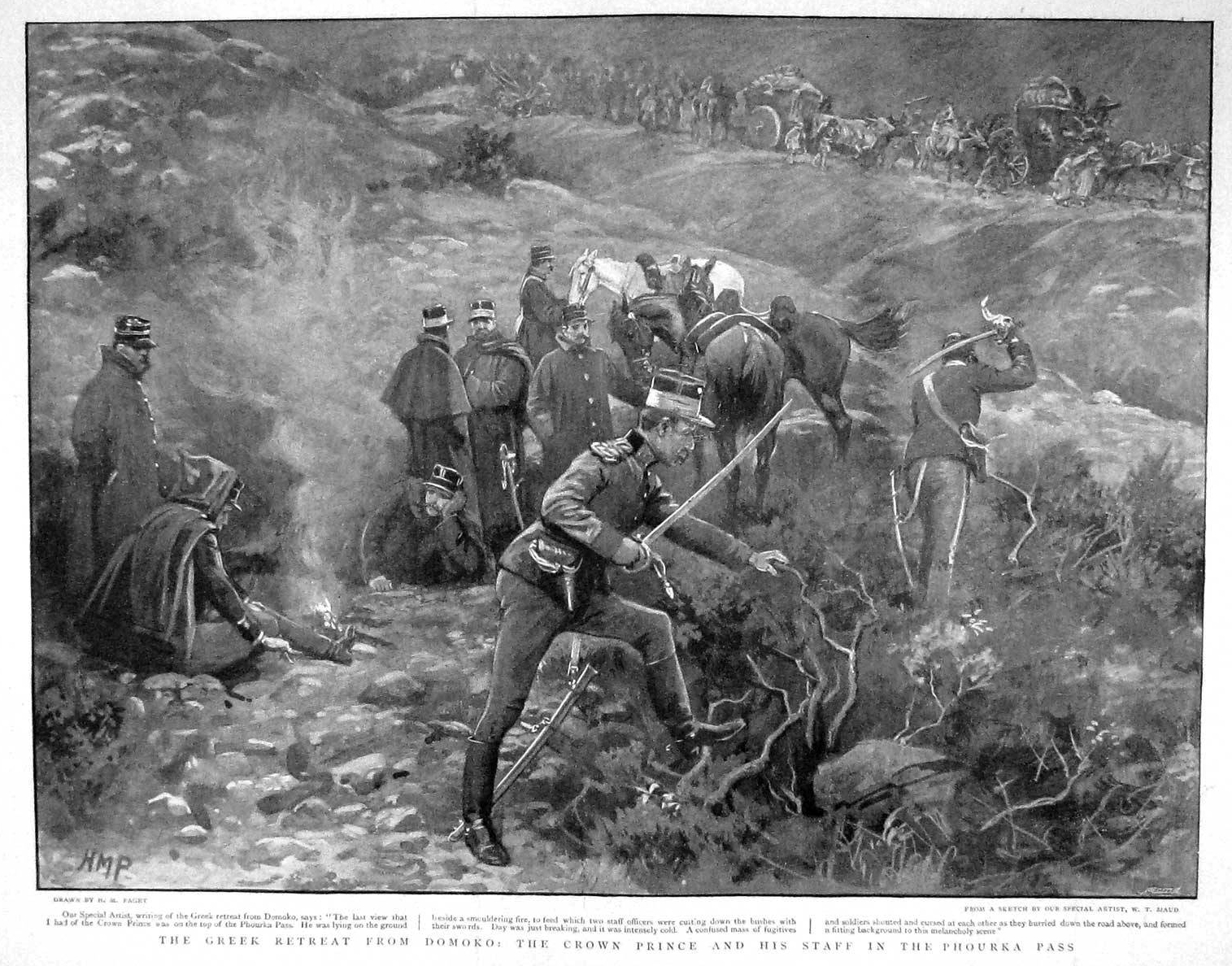
Greek retreat from Domokos - Crown Prince Constantine and entourage

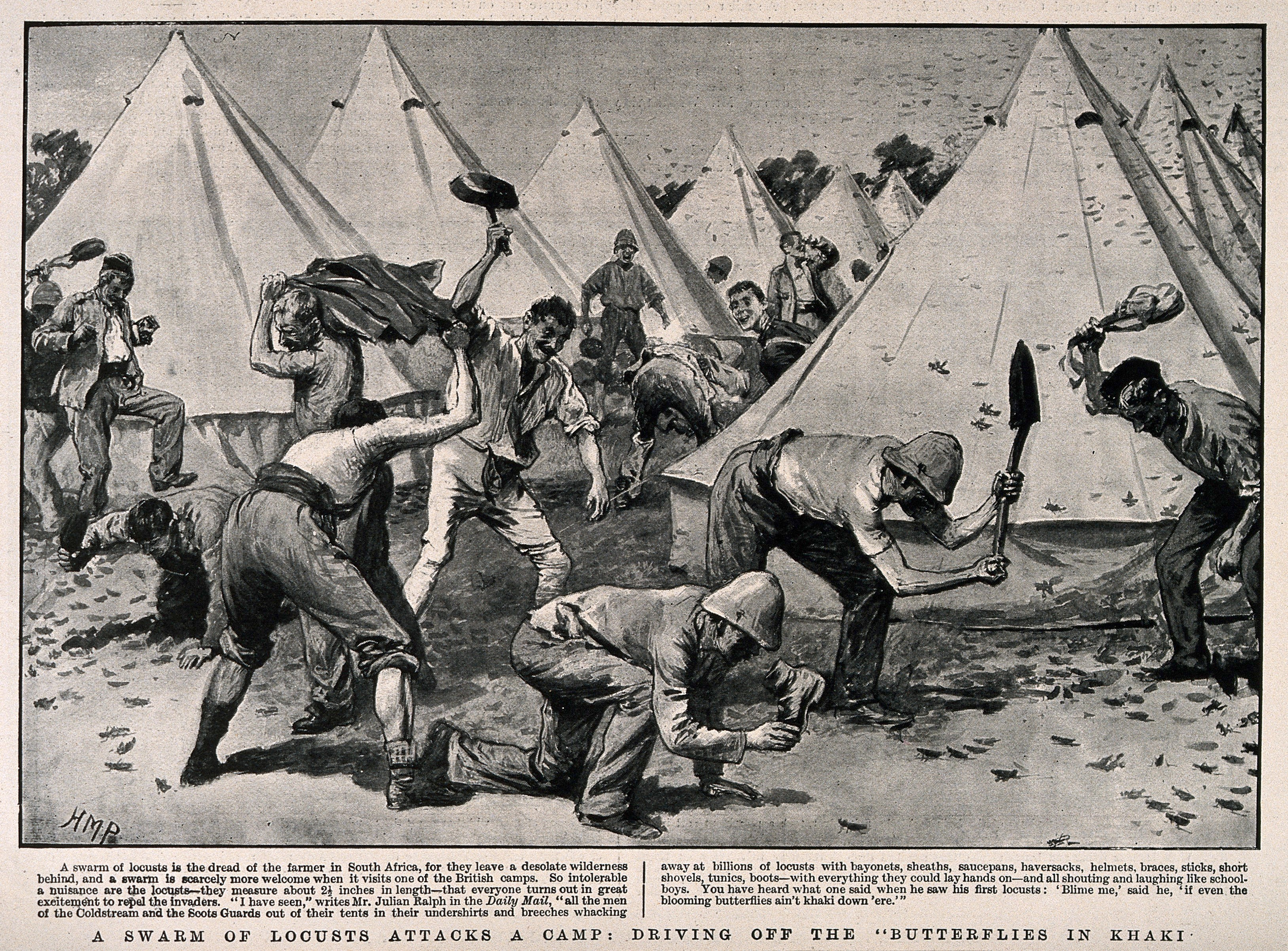
Soldiers in camp driving off a swarm of locusts with anything to hand.

=== Newspaper illustrations turned into paintings ===
Paget sometimes turned sketches into brush and wash or watercolour paintings, as in some of his work from the Boer War.

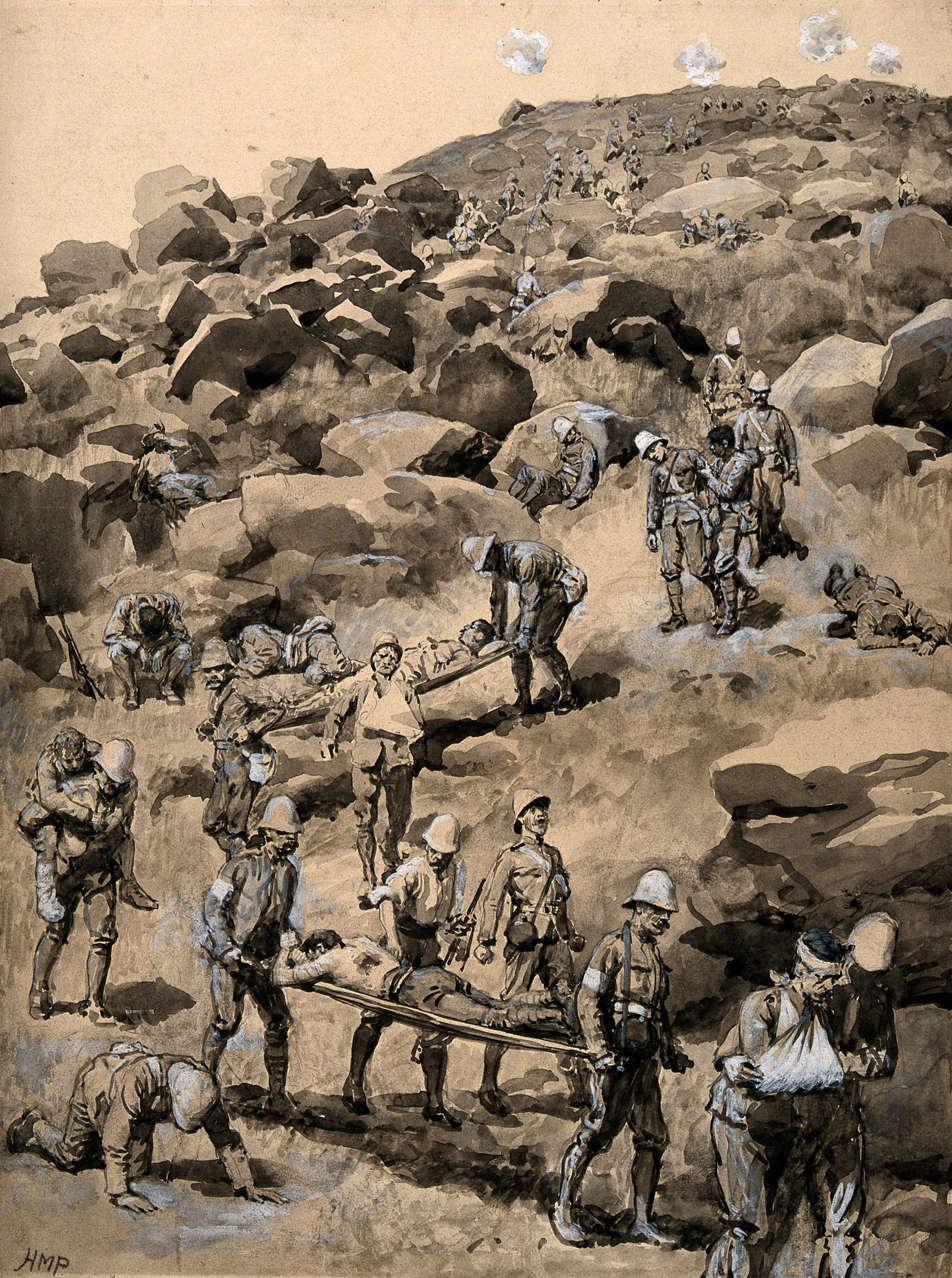
Removing the wounded after battle from Skion Kop

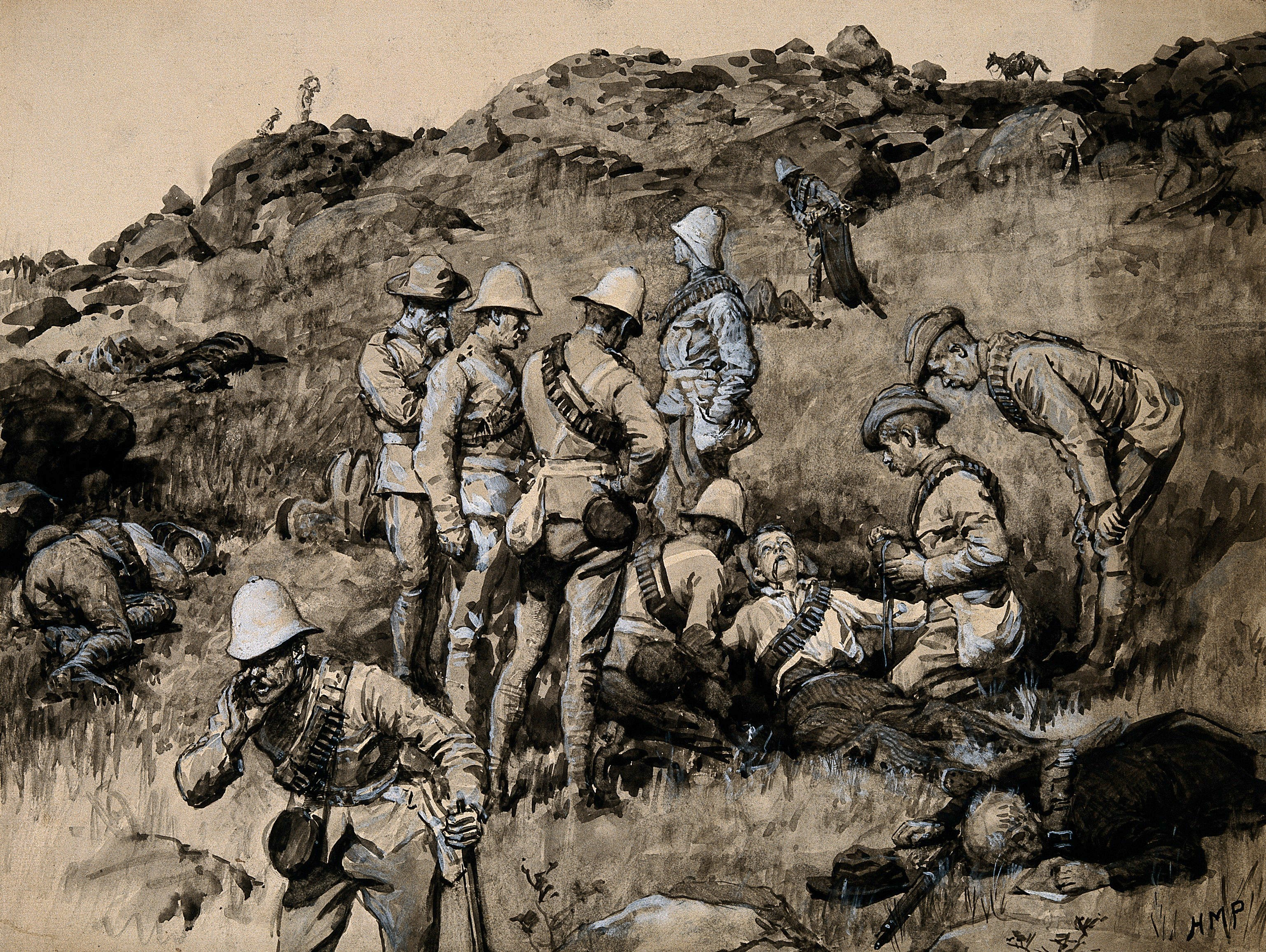
British soldiers tending the wounded Boers after a battle at Potgieter's Drift

=== Painting ===
In addition to his work as an illustrator, he was known in England as a painter, executing portraits, street scenes, and scenes from history and Greek mythology.

He contributed a painting to an 1882 book Bedford Park, celebrating the then-fashionable garden suburb of that name.

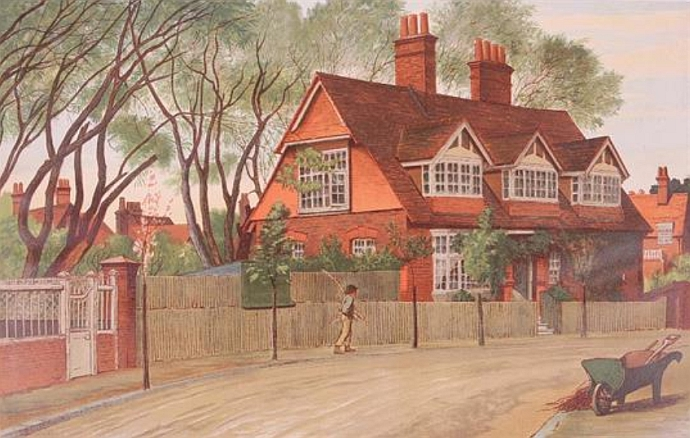
Painting of 7 Queen Anne's Gardens, London, 1882

=== Book illustration ===
Kirkpatrick lists over fifty books illustrated by Paget.

Henry Paget provided illustrations for the 1890 edition of Doyle's story, "Micah Clarke," published by Longmans, Green, and Company.

The Black Arrow by Robert Louis Stevenson had first been published as a serial in Young Folks in 1883 and it was a huge success. Cassell & Co. published the story as a book in 1888, and it was such a success that the first printing sold out to the book trade even before it was published. Cassell brought out a new edition with illustrations by Paget in 1891. The illustrations below are from the 1897 edition by Cassell, from scans at the British Library.

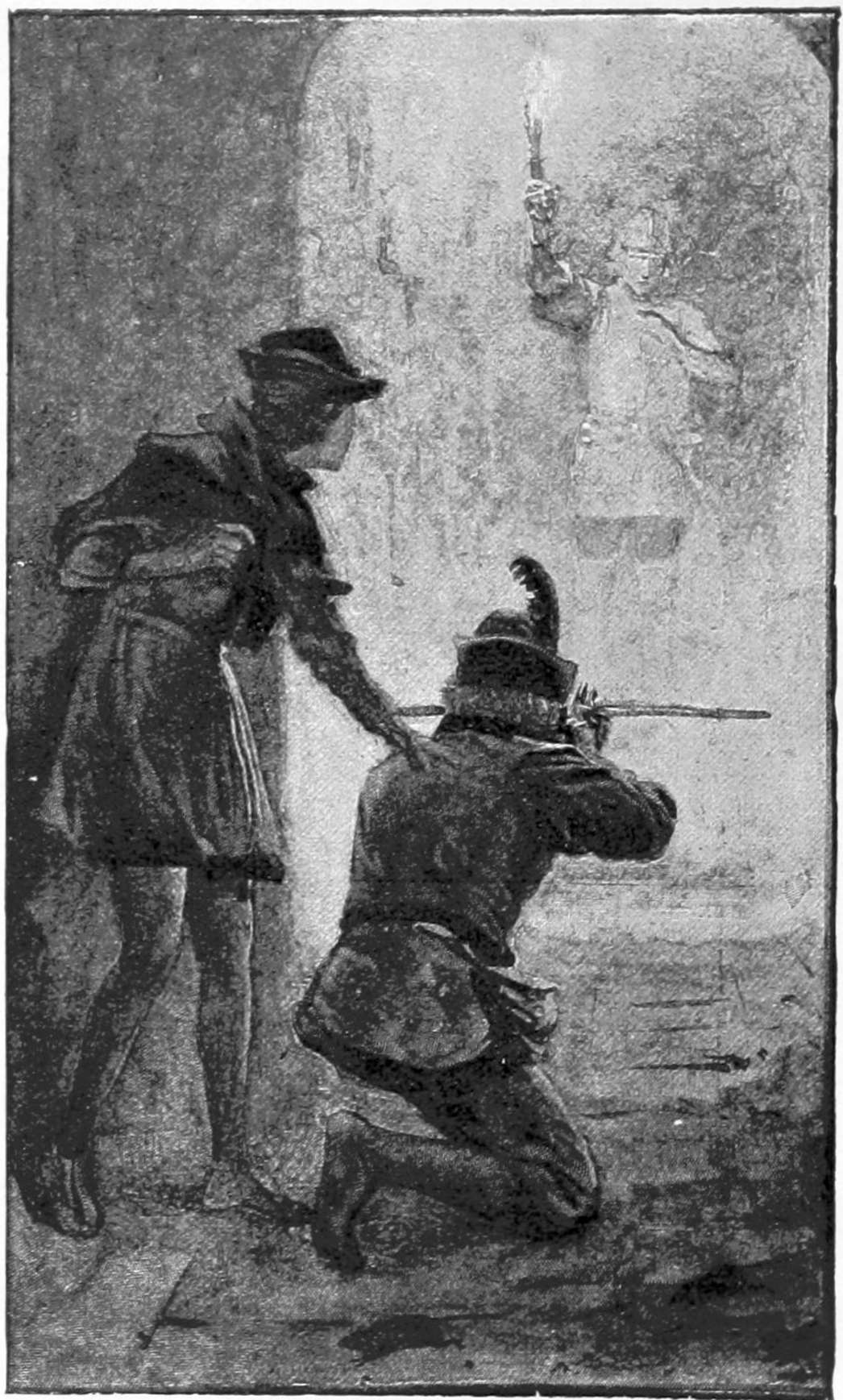
The crossbow man aimed at the unsuspecting target.

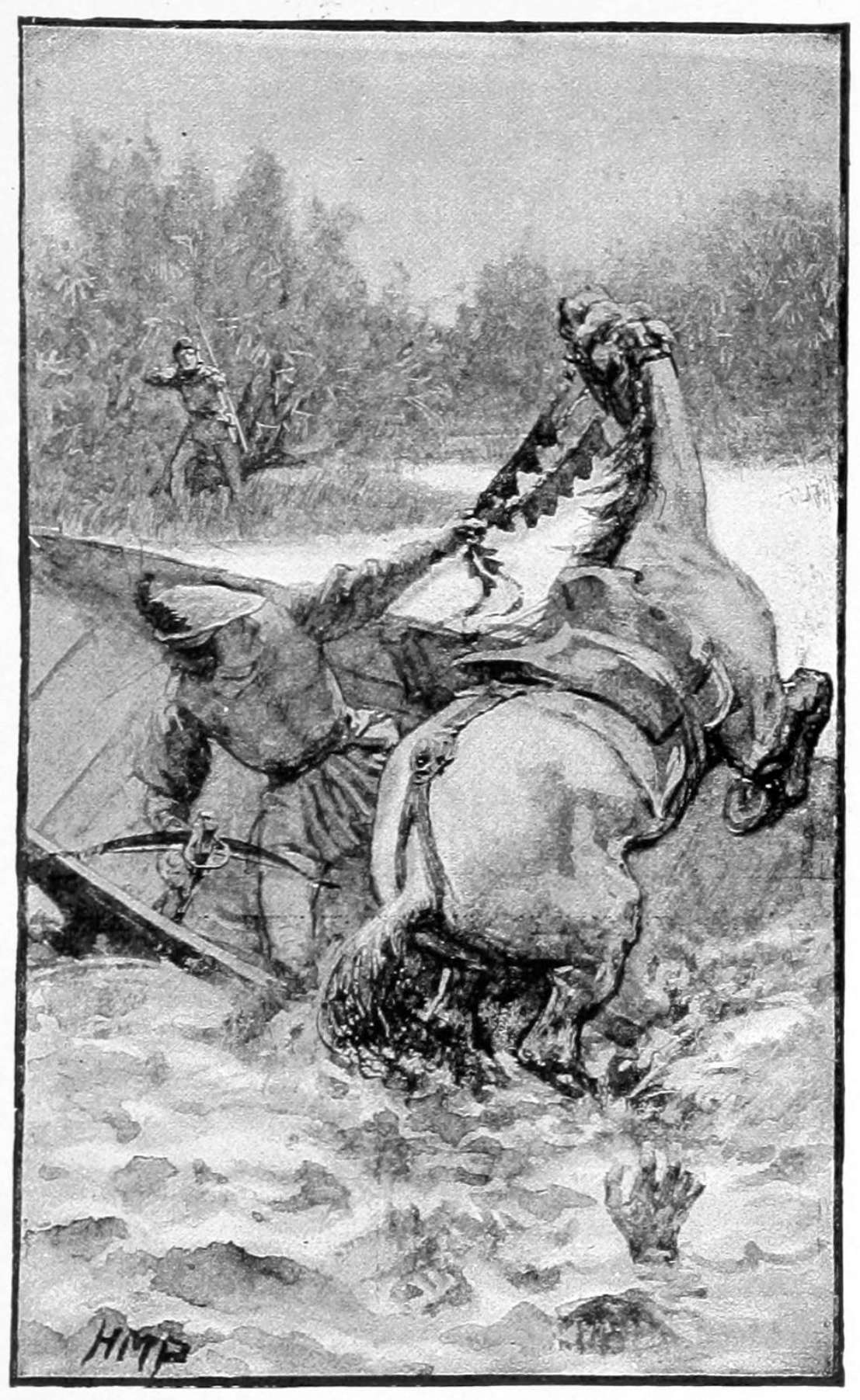
The horse neighed and upset the ferry.
