= List of Libertas list candidates in the 2009 European Parliament election =

This is a complete list of the candidates (excluding substitutes) that ran for the 2009 European Parliament election under a Libertas list.

== Preamble ==
Libertas is a political party founded by Declan Ganley that took part in the 2009 European Parliament election in several member states of the European Union. For the purposes of contending those elections, Libertas candidates ran under lists (the lists of candidates presented to voters in a European election) branded with the Libertas identity, as exemplified by the French approach. Each list was made up of some combination of the following:

- members of member parties (member parties usually had names in the Libertas X format e.g. "Libertas Sweden")
- members of affiliate parties (parties that were not members of Libertas.eu but cooperate with it electorally)
- individual members (people who chose to join Libertas.eu as individuals. Candidates that ran under Libertas lists but who had no national party membership were automatically individual members).

== Summary ==
A summary of Libertas's candidates is as follows:

Member state	Number of candidates
Czech Republic	29
Estonia	6
France	147
Germany	11 (Note: Libertas's website gives a total of 22 people in Germany, made up of 11 actual candidates (bewerber) and their 11 substitute candidates (ersatzbewerber). Substitute candidates, (a.k.a. "alternates" or "replacements") are those people who replace the elected candidate if s/he dies or is otherwise disqualified from sitting in the European Parliament)
Greece	22
Ireland	3
Latvia	8
Malta	1
Netherlands	24
Poland	128 (Note: Kazimierz Wilk and Barbara Czyż resigned from Libertas, reducing the originally-reported total of 130 by two)
Portugal	22
Slovakia	13
Spain	50
UK	56 (Note: Benjamin Caradoc Tallis resigned from Libertas, reducing the originally-reported total of 57 by one)

== Candidates ==
A complete list of the candidates (excluding substitutes) that ran for the 2009 European Parliament election under Libertas lists is as follows:

Candidate	Member state	List	Party	Member of member party?	Member of affiliate party?	Individual member?	Notes	Sources
Vlastimil Tlustý	Czech Republic	Libertas Czech Republic	Civic Democratic Party (Note: ODS ran its own official list in the 2009 European Parliament elections and is not an official Libertas affiliate.)	N	N	Y		
Vladimir Zelezny	Czech Republic	Libertas Czech Republic	Nezávislí demokraté	N	Y	N		
Jan Schwippel	Czech Republic	Libertas Czech Republic	no party	N	N	Y		
Andrea Hudlikova	Czech Republic	Libertas Czech Republic	Libertas Czech Republic	N	Y	N		
Lubos Vrtilka	Czech Republic	Libertas Czech Republic	no party	N	N	Y		
Ivan Cundrle	Czech Republic	Libertas Czech Republic	Doktoři (za uzdravení společnosti)	N	Y	N		
Vladimir Litwan	Czech Republic	Libertas Czech Republic	Nezávislí demokraté	N	Y	N		
Miroslav Libal	Czech Republic	Libertas Czech Republic	Nezávislí demokraté	N	Y	N		
Alena Sumova	Czech Republic	Libertas Czech Republic	Nezávislí demokraté	N	Y	N		
Robert Bata	Czech Republic	Libertas Czech Republic	no party	N	N	Y		
Rostislav Stranik	Czech Republic	Libertas Czech Republic	no party	N	N	Y		
Nadezda Stauderova	Czech Republic	Libertas Czech Republic	Nezávislí demokraté	N	Y	N		
Anna Haisova	Czech Republic	Libertas Czech Republic	Nezávislí demokraté	N	Y	N		
Ctirad Lolek	Czech Republic	Libertas Czech Republic	no party	N	N	Y		
Jana Kudelkova	Czech Republic	Libertas Czech Republic	Nezávislí demokraté	N	Y	N		
Vladimir John	Czech Republic	Libertas Czech Republic	Nezávislí demokraté	N	Y	N		
Pavel Hanak	Czech Republic	Libertas Czech Republic	Nezávislí demokraté	N	Y	N		
Mojmir Lysek	Czech Republic	Libertas Czech Republic	no party	N	N	Y		
Frantisek Kabelka	Czech Republic	Libertas Czech Republic	Nezávislí demokraté	N	Y	N		
Otta Hercik	Czech Republic	Libertas Czech Republic	Nezávislí demokraté	N	Y	N		
Stanislav Bartosek	Czech Republic	Libertas Czech Republic	Nezávislí demokraté	N	Y	N		
Lenka Saskova	Czech Republic	Libertas Czech Republic	Nezávislí demokraté	N	Y	N		
Stanislav Bata	Czech Republic	Libertas Czech Republic	Nezávislí demokraté	N	Y	N		
Jan Fuka	Czech Republic	Libertas Czech Republic	Libertas Czech Republic	N	Y	N		
Lenka Mala	Czech Republic	Libertas Czech Republic	Nezávislí demokraté	N	Y	N		
Dalibor Matejicek	Czech Republic	Libertas Czech Republic	Nezávislí demokraté	N	Y	N		
Vera Bohmova	Czech Republic	Libertas Czech Republic	Nezávislí demokraté	N	Y	N		
Miroslav Horacek	Czech Republic	Libertas Czech Republic	Nezávislí demokraté	N	Y	N		
Martin Frasko	Czech Republic	Libertas Czech Republic	Nezávislí demokraté	N	Y	N		
Jüri Estam	Estonia	Libertas Estonia	Libertas Estonia	Y	N	N		
Jaanus Glaase	Estonia	Libertas Estonia	Libertas Estonia	Y	N	N		
Mati Kõrts	Estonia	Libertas Estonia	Libertas Estonia	Y	N	N		
Kristjan Pihus	Estonia	Libertas Estonia	Libertas Estonia	Y	N	N		
Sean Thomas Donohoe	Estonia	Libertas Estonia	Libertas Estonia	Y	N	N		
Jaan Laas	Estonia	Libertas Estonia	Libertas Estonia	Y	N	N		
Frédéric Nihous	France	Libertas France	CPNT or MPF	N	Y	N	North-West France	
Isabelle Letrillard-Debray	France	Libertas France	CPNT or MPF	N	Y	N	North-West France	
Didier Vergy	France	Libertas France	CPNT or MPF	N	Y	N	North-West France	
Monique Huon	France	Libertas France	CPNT or MPF	N	Y	N	North-West France	
Hubert De Bailliencourt	France	Libertas France	CPNT or MPF	N	Y	N	North-West France	
Martine Lefebure-Thevenet	France	Libertas France	CPNT or MPF	N	Y	N	North-West France	
Renaud Blondin	France	Libertas France	CPNT or MPF	N	Y	N	North-West France	
Catherine Gibert	France	Libertas France	CPNT or MPF	N	Y	N	North-West France	
Pascal Marie	France	Libertas France	CPNT or MPF	N	Y	N	North-West France	
Marie-Elisabeth Pierdet	France	Libertas France	CPNT or MPF	N	Y	N	North-West France	
Jean-Michel Becquet	France	Libertas France	CPNT or MPF	N	Y	N	North-West France	
Claudine Prod'homme	France	Libertas France	CPNT or MPF	N	Y	N	North-West France	
Yves Bauw	France	Libertas France	CPNT or MPF	N	Y	N	North-West France	
Marie-Christine Bernaux	France	Libertas France	CPNT or MPF	N	Y	N	North-West France	
Jean Lemoine	France	Libertas France	CPNT or MPF	N	Y	N	North-West France	
Sophie Noël	France	Libertas France	CPNT or MPF	N	Y	N	North-West France	
Bernard Douet	France	Libertas France	CPNT or MPF	N	Y	N	North-West France	
Monique Calvo-Dahlborg	France	Libertas France	CPNT or MPF	N	Y	N	North-West France	
Alain Betems	France	Libertas France	CPNT or MPF	N	Y	N	North-West France	
Véronique De Villiers	France	Libertas France	CPNT or MPF	N	Y	N	North-West France	
Philippe de Villiers	France	Libertas France	CPNT or MPF	N	Y	N	West France	
Sophie Mevel	France	Libertas France	CPNT or MPF	N	Y	N	West France	
Jean-Louis Bernié	France	Libertas France	CPNT or MPF	N	Y	N	West France	
Anne Fouquenet	France	Libertas France	CPNT or MPF	N	Y	N	West France	
Thierry Joulin	France	Libertas France	CPNT or MPF	N	Y	N	West France	
Sophie Lefort	France	Libertas France	CPNT or MPF	N	Y	N	West France	
Dominique Pilet	France	Libertas France	CPNT or MPF	N	Y	N	West France	
Mireille Lavaud	France	Libertas France	CPNT or MPF	N	Y	N	West France	
Claude Rabard	France	Libertas France	CPNT or MPF	N	Y	N	West France	
Véronique Meheust	France	Libertas France	CPNT or MPF	N	Y	N	West France	
Jean-Yves De Prat	France	Libertas France	CPNT or MPF	N	Y	N	West France	
Christiane Savariau	France	Libertas France	CPNT or MPF	N	Y	N	West France	
Gérard Pierre	France	Libertas France	CPNT or MPF	N	Y	N	West France	
Patricia Rio	France	Libertas France	CPNT or MPF	N	Y	N	West France	
Gérard Morin	France	Libertas France	CPNT or MPF	N	Y	N	West France	
Sandrine Bretaud	France	Libertas France	CPNT or MPF	N	Y	N	West France	
Patrick Daviaud	France	Libertas France	CPNT or MPF	N	Y	N	West France	
Brigitte De Fontaines	France	Libertas France	CPNT or MPF	N	Y	N	West France	
Christophe Beaudouin	France	Libertas France	CPNT or MPF	N	Y	N	East France	
Delphine Mann	France	Libertas France	CPNT or MPF	N	Y	N	East France	
Pierre Pescarolo	France	Libertas France	CPNT or MPF	N	Y	N	East France	
Laura Sabatier Burrier	France	Libertas France	CPNT or MPF	N	Y	N	East France	
Guy Boiche	France	Libertas France	CPNT or MPF	N	Y	N	East France	
Isabelle Loreaux	France	Libertas France	CPNT or MPF	N	Y	N	East France	
Joseph Beaussaron	France	Libertas France	CPNT or MPF	N	Y	N	East France	
Marie-Jeanne Bontemps	France	Libertas France	CPNT or MPF	N	Y	N	East France	
Jean-Marc Petitpierre	France	Libertas France	CPNT or MPF	N	Y	N	East France	
Ghislaine Marie	France	Libertas France	CPNT or MPF	N	Y	N	East France	
Bertrand De Villiers	France	Libertas France	CPNT or MPF	N	Y	N	East France	
Marguerite Alex	France	Libertas France	CPNT or MPF	N	Y	N	East France	
Hervé Hocquet	France	Libertas France	CPNT or MPF	N	Y	N	East France	
Jacqueline Andreoli	France	Libertas France	CPNT or MPF	N	Y	N	East France	
Bruno Deleuze	France	Libertas France	CPNT or MPF	N	Y	N	East France	
Hélène Sabattier	France	Libertas France	CPNT or MPF	N	Y	N	East France	
Pascal Raveau	France	Libertas France	CPNT or MPF	N	Y	N	East France	
Clotilde Massonnet	France	Libertas France	CPNT or MPF	N	Y	N	East France	
Eddie Puyjalon	France	Libertas France	CPNT or MPF	N	Y	N	South-West France	
Marie-Pierre Chaumette	France	Libertas France	CPNT or MPF	N	Y	N	South-West France	
Marc Taulelle	France	Libertas France	CPNT or MPF	N	Y	N	South-West France	
Marie-Francine De Pierpont	France	Libertas France	CPNT or MPF	N	Y	N	South-West France	
Michel Auroux	France	Libertas France	CPNT or MPF	N	Y	N	South-West France	
Sylvia Benoist-Heurtebize	France	Libertas France	CPNT or MPF	N	Y	N	South-West France	
Jean-François Corbiere	France	Libertas France	CPNT or MPF	N	Y	N	South-West France	
Jocelyne Roge	France	Libertas France	CPNT or MPF	N	Y	N	South-West France	
René Bacou	France	Libertas France	CPNT or MPF	N	Y	N	South-West France	
Patricia Rigot	France	Libertas France	CPNT or MPF	N	Y	N	South-West France	
Patrice Buffet	France	Libertas France	CPNT or MPF	N	Y	N	South-West France	
Andrée Chenuaud	France	Libertas France	CPNT or MPF	N	Y	N	South-West France	
Serge Canadas	France	Libertas France	CPNT or MPF	N	Y	N	South-West France	
Catherine Crambert	France	Libertas France	CPNT or MPF	N	Y	N	South-West France	
Jean-Marie Soubies	France	Libertas France	CPNT or MPF	N	Y	N	South-West France	
Brigitte De Vergeron	France	Libertas France	CPNT or MPF	N	Y	N	South-West France	
Emmanuel De Villiers	France	Libertas France	CPNT or MPF	N	Y	N	South-West France	
Anne Perrinet	France	Libertas France	CPNT or MPF	N	Y	N	South-West France	
Christian Touhé-Rumeau	France	Libertas France	CPNT or MPF	N	Y	N	South-West France	
Hélène Nihous	France	Libertas France	CPNT or MPF	N	Y	N	South-West France	
Patrick Louis	France	Libertas France	CPNT or MPF	N	Y	N	South-East France	
Marie-Claude Bompard	France	Libertas France	CPNT or MPF	N	Y	N	South-East France	
Denis Baratay	France	Libertas France	CPNT or MPF	N	Y	N	South-East France	
Christiane Devaux-Scamaroni	France	Libertas France	CPNT or MPF	N	Y	N	South-East France	
Patrick Benoit	France	Libertas France	CPNT or MPF	N	Y	N	South-East France	
Joëlle Martinaux	France	Libertas France	CPNT or MPF	N	Y	N	South-East France	
Lucien Louis Michel Morini	France	Libertas France	CPNT or MPF	N	Y	N	South-East France	
Anne-Marie Rinaldi	France	Libertas France	CPNT or MPF	N	Y	N	South-East France	
Bruno Paliard	France	Libertas France	CPNT or MPF	N	Y	N	South-East France	
Véronique Leger	France	Libertas France	CPNT or MPF	N	Y	N	South-East France	
Christophe Frachon	France	Libertas France	CPNT or MPF	N	Y	N	South-East France	
Catherine Quincy	France	Libertas France	CPNT or MPF	N	Y	N	South-East France	
Philippe Labadens	France	Libertas France	CPNT or MPF	N	Y	N	South-East France	
Michèle Chomienne	France	Libertas France	CPNT or MPF	N	Y	N	South-East France	
Jean-François Portray	France	Libertas France	CPNT or MPF	N	Y	N	South-East France	
Anne-Claire Jacquin	France	Libertas France	CPNT or MPF	N	Y	N	South-East France	
François Cornileau	France	Libertas France	CPNT or MPF	N	Y	N	South-East France	
Jacqueline Kossow	France	Libertas France	CPNT or MPF	N	Y	N	South-East France	
Bruno Gindre	France	Libertas France	CPNT or MPF	N	Y	N	South-East France	
Nadège Le Toux	France	Libertas France	CPNT or MPF	N	Y	N	South-East France	
Alain Gillet	France	Libertas France	CPNT or MPF	N	Y	N	South-East France	
Caroline De Villiers	France	Libertas France	CPNT or MPF	N	Y	N	South-East France	
Eric Decottegnie	France	Libertas France	CPNT or MPF	N	Y	N	South-East France	
Jeanne d'Anglejan	France	Libertas France	CPNT or MPF	N	Y	N	South-East France	
Raymond Mora	France	Libertas France	CPNT or MPF	N	Y	N	South-East France	
Marie-France Nersessian	France	Libertas France	CPNT or MPF	N	Y	N	South-East France	
Véronique Goncalves	France	Libertas France	CPNT or MPF	N	Y	N	Loire, Massif Central	
Patrick Lepers	France	Libertas France	CPNT or MPF	N	Y	N	Loire, Massif Central	
Patricia Boissy	France	Libertas France	CPNT or MPF	N	Y	N	Loire, Massif Central	
Jean-Jacques Bourzeix	France	Libertas France	CPNT or MPF	N	Y	N	Loire, Massif Central	
Françoise Seillier	France	Libertas France	CPNT or MPF	N	Y	N	Loire, Massif Central	
Marc Wasilewski	France	Libertas France	CPNT or MPF	N	Y	N	Loire, Massif Central	
Yolande Trouillet	France	Libertas France	CPNT or MPF	N	Y	N	Loire, Massif Central	
François Care	France	Libertas France	CPNT or MPF	N	Y	N	Loire, Massif Central	
Anne-Aymone De Villiers	France	Libertas France	CPNT or MPF	N	Y	N	Loire, Massif Central	
Jean-Pierre Nihous	France	Libertas France	CPNT or MPF	N	Y	N	Loire, Massif Central	
Jérôme Rivière	France	Libertas France	CPNT or MPF	N	Y	N	Île-de-France	
Dominique Baud	France	Libertas France	CPNT or MPF	N	Y	N	Île-de-France	
Yannick Villardier	France	Libertas France	CPNT or MPF	N	Y	N	Île-de-France	
Maud De Lesquen	France	Libertas France	CPNT or MPF	N	Y	N	Île-de-France	
Jean-Michel Bertrand	France	Libertas France	CPNT or MPF	N	Y	N	Île-de-France	
Josée Tilquin	France	Libertas France	CPNT or MPF	N	Y	N	Île-de-France	
Christian Daniault	France	Libertas France	CPNT or MPF	N	Y	N	Île-de-France	
Amélie Barraud	France	Libertas France	CPNT or MPF	N	Y	N	Île-de-France	
Christian Bruys	France	Libertas France	CPNT or MPF	N	Y	N	Île-de-France	
Sandra Fevre	France	Libertas France	CPNT or MPF	N	Y	N	Île-de-France	
Alexandre Delport	France	Libertas France	CPNT or MPF	N	Y	N	Île-de-France	
Armelle Chapalain	France	Libertas France	CPNT or MPF	N	Y	N	Île-de-France	
Alain Desnoyers	France	Libertas France	CPNT or MPF	N	Y	N	Île-de-France	
Florence Drouard	France	Libertas France	CPNT or MPF	N	Y	N	Île-de-France	
Eric Zonta	France	Libertas France	CPNT or MPF	N	Y	N	Île-de-France	
Catherine Servary	France	Libertas France	CPNT or MPF	N	Y	N	Île-de-France	
Dominique Jalenques	France	Libertas France	CPNT or MPF	N	Y	N	Île-de-France	
Valérie Munier	France	Libertas France	CPNT or MPF	N	Y	N	Île-de-France	
Aurélien Fresnel	France	Libertas France	CPNT or MPF	N	Y	N	Île-de-France	
Nathalie Soutinho	France	Libertas France	CPNT or MPF	N	Y	N	Île-de-France	
Eric De Saint Martin	France	Libertas France	CPNT or MPF	N	Y	N	Île-de-France	
Claire Vlach	France	Libertas France	CPNT or MPF	N	Y	N	Île-de-France	
Jean-Jacques Alex	France	Libertas France	CPNT or MPF	N	Y	N	Île-de-France	
Charlotte De Villiers	France	Libertas France	CPNT or MPF	N	Y	N	Île-de-France	
Alain Polu	France	Libertas France	CPNT or MPF	N	Y	N	Île-de-France	
Odette Frouin	France	Libertas France	CPNT or MPF	N	Y	N	Île-de-France	
Erika Kuttner-Perreau	France	Libertas France	CPNT or MPF	N	Y	N	Overseas Territories of France	
Yohan Noel	France	Libertas France	CPNT or MPF	N	Y	N	Overseas Territories of France	
Arlette Gelanor	France	Libertas France	CPNT or MPF	N	Y	N	Overseas Territories of France	
Jules Simana	France	Libertas France	CPNT or MPF	N	Y	N	Overseas Territories of France	
Juliette Nubret	France	Libertas France	CPNT or MPF	N	Y	N	Overseas Territories of France	
Vincent Sabattier	France	Libertas France	CPNT or MPF	N	Y	N	Overseas Territories of France	
Hélène Gilot	France	Libertas France	CPNT or MPF	N	Y	N	Overseas Territories of France	
Jean-André Senailles	France	Libertas France	CPNT or MPF	N	Y	N	Overseas Territories of France	
Maguy Maurinier	France	Libertas France	CPNT or MPF	N	Y	N	Overseas Territories of France	
Dieter Alfred Burr	Germany	Libertas Germany	AUF - Partei für Arbeit, Umwelt und Familie	N	Y	N		
Roswitha Becker-Braun	Germany	Libertas Germany	AUF - Partei für Arbeit, Umwelt und Familie	N	Y	N		
Mathias Scheuschner	Germany	Libertas Germany	AUF - Partei für Arbeit, Umwelt und Familie	N	Y	N		
Michael Döbrich	Germany	Libertas Germany	AUF - Partei für Arbeit, Umwelt und Familie	N	Y	N		
Wolfgang Höhn	Germany	Libertas Germany	AUF - Partei für Arbeit, Umwelt und Familie	N	Y	N		
Jürgen Andreas Schulz-Lützenbürger	Germany	Libertas Germany	AUF - Partei für Arbeit, Umwelt und Familie	N	Y	N		
Jochen Kotowski	Germany	Libertas Germany	AUF - Partei für Arbeit, Umwelt und Familie	N	Y	N		
Michael Josef Kien	Germany	Libertas Germany	AUF - Partei für Arbeit, Umwelt und Familie	N	Y	N		
Thomas Schatton	Germany	Libertas Germany	AUF - Partei für Arbeit, Umwelt und Familie	N	Y	N		
Uta Mohyla	Germany	Libertas Germany	AUF - Partei für Arbeit, Umwelt und Familie	N	Y	N		
Christian Hauser	Germany	Libertas Germany	AUF - Partei für Arbeit, Umwelt und Familie	N	Y	N		
Emmanouil Kalligiannis	Greece	Libertas Greece	Komma Fileleftheron	N	Y	N		
Stavros Fotakis	Greece	Libertas Greece	Komma Fileleftheron	N	Y	N		
Emmanouil Bandouvas	Greece	Libertas Greece	Komma Fileleftheron	N	Y	N		
Reveka Pousoulidou	Greece	Libertas Greece	Komma Fileleftheron	N	Y	N		
Dimitrios Kokkinidis	Greece	Libertas Greece	Komma Fileleftheron	N	Y	N		
Christina Vassalou	Greece	Libertas Greece	Komma Fileleftheron	N	Y	N		
Emmanouil Oikonomakis	Greece	Libertas Greece	Komma Fileleftheron	N	Y	N		
Despoina Kritikou	Greece	Libertas Greece	Komma Fileleftheron	N	Y	N		
Dimitrios Glynos	Greece	Libertas Greece	Komma Fileleftheron	N	Y	N		
Loukia Koskina	Greece	Libertas Greece	Komma Fileleftheron	N	Y	N		
Charalambos Tsoukalas	Greece	Libertas Greece	Komma Fileleftheron	N	Y	N		
Dorothea Roussou	Greece	Libertas Greece	Komma Fileleftheron	N	Y	N		
Iosif Androulidakis	Greece	Libertas Greece	Komma Fileleftheron	N	Y	N		
Dimitra Avrambou	Greece	Libertas Greece	Komma Fileleftheron	N	Y	N		
Georgios Kyriakidis	Greece	Libertas Greece	Komma Fileleftheron	N	Y	N		
Eleni Dimitrakopoulou	Greece	Libertas Greece	Komma Fileleftheron	N	Y	N		
Konstantinos Klotsas	Greece	Libertas Greece	Komma Fileleftheron	N	Y	N		
Zoi Mytika	Greece	Libertas Greece	Komma Fileleftheron	N	Y	N		
Eleni Stamboulidou	Greece	Libertas Greece	Komma Fileleftheron	N	Y	N		
Eleftherios Koutras	Greece	Libertas Greece	Komma Fileleftheron	N	Y	N		
Aspasia Boultadaki	Greece	Libertas Greece	Komma Fileleftheron	N	Y	N		
Athanasios Papadiotis	Greece	Libertas Greece	Komma Fileleftheron	N	Y	N		
Caroline Simons	Ireland	Libertas Ireland	Libertas Ireland	Y	N	N	Dublin	
Raymond O'Malley	Ireland	Libertas Ireland	Libertas Ireland	Y	N	N	East	
Declan Ganley	Ireland	Libertas Ireland	Libertas Ireland	Y	N	N	North-West	
Guntars Krasts	Latvia	Libertas Latvia	Libertas.lv	N	N	Y		
Juris Ozoliņš	LatviaLibertas.lv	N	Y	N				
Gints Karlsons	LatviaLibertas.lv	N	Y	N				
Ivars Brivers	Latvia	Libertas.lv	N	Y	N			
Ingrida Veikša	Latvia	Libertas.lv	N	Y	N			
Kristina Lufta	Latvia	Libertas.lv	N	Y	N			
Anita Berzina	Latvia	Libertas.lv	N	Y	N			
Edgars Nikels	Latvia	Libertas.lv	N	Y	N			
Mary Gauci	Malta	Libertas Malta	Libertas Malta	Y	N	N		
Eline van den Broek	Netherlands	Libertas Netherlands	Libertas Netherlands	Y	N	N		
Marten Schwandt	Netherlands	Libertas Netherlands	Libertas Netherlands	Y	N	N		
Alexander Brom	Netherlands	Libertas Netherlands	Libertas Netherlands	Y	N	N		
Ron Verschoor	Netherlands	Libertas Netherlands	Libertas Netherlands	Y	N	N		
Marlies Mulder	Netherlands	Libertas Netherlands	Libertas Netherlands	Y	N	N		
Maurice de Valk	Netherlands	Libertas Netherlands	Libertas Netherlands	Y	N	N		
Rob IJff	Netherlands	Libertas Netherlands	Libertas Netherlands	Y	N	N		
Benjamin Nura	Netherlands	Libertas Netherlands	Libertas Netherlands	Y	N	N		
Loubna Berrada	Netherlands	Libertas Netherlands	Libertas Netherlands	Y	N	N		
Sander Boon	Netherlands	Libertas Netherlands	Libertas Netherlands	Y	N	N		
Johann Grünbauer	Netherlands	Libertas Netherlands	Libertas Netherlands	Y	N	N		
Abraham de Kruijf	Netherlands	Libertas Netherlands	Libertas Netherlands	Y	N	N		
Johan Bronsdijk	Netherlands	Libertas Netherlands	Libertas Netherlands	Y	N	N		
Jeroen Nieuwesteeg	Netherlands	Libertas Netherlands	Libertas Netherlands	Y	N	N		
Oguzhan Kilic	Netherlands	Libertas Netherlands	Libertas Netherlands	Y	N	N		
Gerrit van den Berg	Netherlands	Libertas Netherlands	Libertas Netherlands	Y	N	N		
Davy Jansen	Netherlands	Libertas Netherlands	Libertas Netherlands	Y	N	N		
Koen Schröder	Netherlands	Libertas Netherlands	Libertas Netherlands	Y	N	N		
Lukas Teijema	Netherlands	Libertas Netherlands	Libertas Netherlands	Y	N	N		
Alexandra Strieker	Netherlands	Libertas Netherlands	Libertas Netherlands	Y	N	N		
Madelene Munnik	Netherlands	Libertas Netherlands	Libertas Netherlands	Y	N	N		
Floor Vreeswijk	Netherlands	Libertas Netherlands	Libertas Netherlands	Y	N	N		
Anton Brom	Netherlands	Libertas Netherlands	Libertas Netherlands	Y	N	N		
Hans Besseling	Netherlands	Libertas Netherlands	Libertas Netherlands	Y	N	N		
Piotr Michał Chmurzyński	Poland	Libertas Poland	Forward Poland	N	Y	N		
Janusz Konrad Dobrosz	Poland	Libertas Poland	Forward Poland	N	Y	N		
Teresa Aleksandra Izworska	Poland	Libertas Poland	Forward Poland	N	Y	N		
Dariusz Maciej Grabowski	Poland	Libertas Poland	Forward Poland	N	Y	N		
Jadwiga Paradowska	Poland	Libertas Poland	Forward Poland	N	Y	N		
Mirosław Andrzej Ciechanowski	Poland	Libertas Poland	League of Polish Families	N	Y	N		
Adam Paweł Karczewski	Poland	Libertas Poland	League of Polish Families	N	Y	N		
Danuta Maria Łukasiewicz	Poland	Libertas Poland	League of Polish Families	N	Y	N		
Roman Pająk	Poland	Libertas Poland	League of Polish Families	N	Y	N		
Jan Zygmunt Piechowski	Poland	Libertas Poland	League of Polish Families	N	Y	N		
Elżbieta Anna Słowińska	Poland	Libertas Poland	League of Polish Families	N	Y	N		
Agnieszka Szłykowicz	Poland	Libertas Poland	League of Polish Families	N	Y	N		
Stanislaw Tujaka	Poland	Libertas Poland	League of Polish Families	N	Y	N		
Jarosław Chodorowski	Poland	Libertas Poland	League of Polish Families	N	Y	N		
Stanisław Jan Dębski	Poland	Libertas Poland	League of Polish Families	N	Y	N		
Stanisław Papież	Poland	Libertas Poland	League of Polish Families	N	Y	N		
Stanisław Krzysztof Sendor	Poland	Libertas Poland	League of Polish Families	N	Y	N		
Piotr Paweł Stachura	Poland	Libertas Poland	League of Polish Families	N	Y	N		
Wojciech Wierzejski	Poland	Libertas Poland	League of Polish Families	N	Y	N		
Edmund Zając	Poland	Libertas Poland	League of Polish Families	N	Y	N		
Longin Jerzy Dobrakowski	Poland	Libertas Poland	League of Polish Families	N	Y	N		
Radosław Paweł Sławomirski	Poland	Libertas Poland	League of Polish Families	N	Y	N		
Piotr Jan Ślusarczyk	Poland	Libertas Poland	League of Polish Families	N	Y	N		
Antoni Sosnowski	Poland	Libertas Poland	League of Polish Families	N	Y	N		
Ireneusz Jerzy Partyka	Poland	Libertas Poland	League of Polish Families	N	Y	N		
Jarosław Michał Tarnowski	Poland	Libertas Poland	League of Polish Families	N	Y	N		
Zbigniew Piotr Woźny	Poland	Libertas Poland	League of Polish Families	N	Y	N		
Marek Machaj	Poland	Libertas Poland	League of Polish Families	N	Y	N		
Zdzisław Krzysztof Woźniak	Poland	Libertas Poland	League of Polish Families	N	Y	N		
Andrzej Jan Dorszewski	Poland	Libertas Poland	League of Polish Families	N	Y	N		
Grzegorz Tadeusz Dębski	Poland	Libertas Poland	League of Polish Families	N	Y	N		
Cyprian Andrzej Gutkowski	Poland	Libertas Poland	League of Polish Families	N	Y	N		
Elżbieta Dorota Wilczyńska	Poland	Libertas Poland	League of Polish Families	N	Y	N		
Witold Mieczysław Bałażak	Poland	Libertas Poland	League of Polish Families	N	Y	N		
Angela Bucka	Poland	Libertas Poland	League of Polish Families	N	Y	N		
Waldemar Piotr Gersin	Poland	Libertas Poland	League of Polish Families	N	Y	N		
Arnold Marcin Pyrgiel	Poland	Libertas Poland	League of Polish Families	N	Y	N		
Kazimierz Zaborski	Poland	Libertas Poland	League of Polish Families	N	Y	N		
Jacek Kędzierski	Poland	Libertas Poland	League of Polish Families	N	Y	N		
Zbigniew Walas	Poland	Libertas Poland	League of Polish Families	N	Y	N		
Ryszard Marian Golis	Poland	Libertas Poland	League of Polish Families	N	Y	N		
Violetta Maria Wełniak	Poland	Libertas Poland	League of Polish Families	N	Y	N		
Mieczysława Maria Zalewska	Poland	Libertas Poland	League of Polish Families	N	Y	N		
Maria Sendecka	Poland	Libertas Poland	League of Polish Families	N	Y	N		
Halina Wróbel	Poland	Libertas Poland	League of Polish Families	N	Y	N		
Waldemar Krystian Reksc	Poland	Libertas Poland	no party	N	N	Y		
Tomasz Krzysztof Sommer	Poland	Libertas Poland	no party	N	N	Y		
Halina Ewa Bednarek	Poland	Libertas Poland	no party	N	N	Y		
Leszek Murzyn	Poland	Libertas Poland	no party	N	N	Y		
Rajmund Henryk Pollak	Poland	Libertas Poland	no party	N	N	Y		
Krystian Zbigniew Żelazny	Poland	Libertas Poland	no party	N	N	Y		
Krzysztof Skorobogaty	Poland	Libertas Poland	no party	N	N	Y		
Bogdan Szpryngiel	Poland	Libertas Poland	no party	N	N	Y		
Andrzej Kazimierz Treutz	Poland	Libertas Poland	no party	N	N	Y		
Małgorzata Iwona Gembiak	Poland	Libertas Poland	no party	N	N	Y		
Monika Maria Kaczorowska	Poland	Libertas Poland	no party	N	N	Y		
Ewelina Maria Kandyba	Poland	Libertas Poland	no party	N	N	Y		
Magdalena Lipiec	Poland	Libertas Poland	no party	N	N	Y		
Carlo Paolicelli	Poland	Libertas Poland	no party	N	N	Y		
Ewa Srebniak-Daleka	Poland	Libertas Poland	no party	N	N	Y		
Krzysztof Piotr Zaremba	Poland	Libertas Poland	no party	N	N	Y		
Tomasz Piotr Chudziński	Poland	Libertas Poland	no party	N	N	Y		
Marian Gładyszewski	Poland	Libertas Poland	no party	N	N	Y		
Karol Górski	Poland	Libertas Poland	no party	N	N	Y		
Artur Piotr Juszczak	Poland	Libertas Poland	no party	N	N	Y		
Ewa Kisiel	Poland	Libertas Poland	no party	N	N	Y		
Ryszard Henryk Kozłowski	Poland	Libertas Poland	no party	N	N	Y		
Andrzej Liskula	Poland	Libertas Poland	no party	N	N	Y		
Mirosław Marek Wroński	Poland	Libertas Poland	no party	N	N	Y		
Ryszard Janusz Bender	Poland	Libertas Poland	no party	N	N	Y		
Marek Tadeusz Chybowski	Poland	Libertas Poland	no party	N	N	Y		
Michał Jerzy Daniłowski	Poland	Libertas Poland	no party	N	N	Y		
Tomasz Fedorowicz	Poland	Libertas Poland	no party	N	N	Y		
Elżbieta Jabłońska	Poland	Libertas Poland	no party	N	N	Y		
Bogdan Mieczysław Nowacki	Poland	Libertas Poland	no party	N	N	Y		
Jakub Piotr Przymecki	Poland	Libertas Poland	no party	N	N	Y		
Sławomir Pszenny	Poland	Libertas Poland	no party	N	N	Y		
Dariusz Marek Srzednicki	Poland	Libertas Poland	no party	N	N	Y		
Irena Tarnacka	Poland	Libertas Poland	no party	N	N	Y		
Edward Cyran	Poland	Libertas Poland	no party	N	N	Y		
Stanisław Ryszard Domański	Poland	Libertas Poland	no party	N	N	Y		
Marcin Paweł Masny	Poland	Libertas Poland	no party	N	N	Y		
Franciszek Jan Michera	Poland	Libertas Poland	no party	N	N	Y		
Witold Tumanowicz	Poland	Libertas Poland	no party	N	N	Y		
Maciej Marcin Cieplak	Poland	Libertas Poland	no party	N	N	Y		
Grzegorz Filipek	Poland	Libertas Poland	no party	N	N	Y		
Mirosław Janusz Chandrala	Poland	Libertas Poland	no party	N	N	Y		
Ryszard Kaźmierczak	Poland	Libertas Poland	no party	N	N	Y		
Jakub Maciej Pietkiewicz	Poland	Libertas Poland	no party	N	N	Y		
Andrzej Dzieczkowski	Poland	Libertas Poland	no party	N	N	Y		
Błażej Hernacki	Poland	Libertas Poland	no party	N	N	Y		
Monika Ewa Kubiak	Poland	Libertas Poland	no party	N	N	Y		
Daniel Lubiński	Poland	Libertas Poland	no party	N	N	Y		
Rafał Skoczylas	Poland	Libertas Poland	no party	N	N	Y		
Anna Sobecka	Poland	Libertas Poland	no party	N	N	Y		
Ryszard Piotr Heliasz	Poland	Libertas Poland	no party	N	N	Y		
Maria Szajda-Cupryn	Poland	Libertas Poland	no party	N	N	Y		
Bogusław Zenon Żelechowski	Poland	Libertas Poland	no party	N	N	Y		
Daniel Pawłowiec	Poland	Libertas Poland	no party	N	N	Y		
Tadeusz Antoni Rogowski	Poland	Libertas Poland	no party	N	N	Y		
Augustyn Władysław Stachowicz	Poland	Libertas Poland	no party	N	N	Y		
Marcin Krzysztof Turek	Poland	Libertas Poland	no party	N	N	Y		
Jan Maria Zuchowski	Poland	Libertas Poland	no party	N	N	Y		
Jan Eugeniusz Malinowski	Poland	Libertas Poland	Organizacja Narodu Polskiego - Ligi Polskiej	N	Y	N		
Anna Baranowska	Poland	Libertas Poland	Partia Regionów	N	Y	N		
Bolesław Borys Borysiuk	Poland	Libertas Poland	Partia Regionów	N	Y	N		
Józef Klesta	Poland	Libertas Poland	Partia Regionów	N	Y	N		
Andrzej Kocik	Poland	Libertas Poland	Partia Regionów	N	Y	N		
Romuald Fekner	Poland	Libertas Poland	Partia Regionów	N	Y	N		
Henryk Gielżak	Poland	Libertas Poland	Partia Regionów	N	Y	N		
Władysław Żabiński	Poland	Libertas Poland	PSL Piast	N	Y	N		
Henryk Zając	Poland	Libertas Poland	PSL Piast	N	Y	N		
Józef Kolt	Poland	Libertas Poland	PSL Piast	N	Y	N		
Krzysztof Jan Podkański	Poland	Libertas Poland	PSL Piast	N	Y	N		
Andrzej Witos	Poland	Libertas Poland	PSL Piast	N	Y	N		
Andrzej Ruciński	Poland	Libertas Poland	PSL Piast	N	Y	N		
Stanisław Sławomir Grzesko	Poland	Libertas Poland	PSL Piast	N	Y	N		
Dorota Mirosława Hordyjewska	Poland	Libertas Poland	PSL Piast	N	Y	N		
Zdzisław Zbigniew Podkański	Poland	Libertas Poland	PSL Piast	N	Y	N		
Iwona Maria Ćwikła	Poland	Libertas Poland	PSL Piast	N	Y	N		
Dariusz Andrzej Kaznecki	Poland	Libertas Poland	PSL Piast	N	Y	N		
Sławomir Adam Kozarski	Poland	Libertas Poland	PSL Piast	N	Y	N		
Jerzy Jan Rzepka	Poland	Libertas Poland	PSL Piast	N	Y	N		
Sławomir Ligecki	Poland	Libertas Poland	PiS (Note: PiS ran its own official list (Komitet Wyborczy Prawo i Sprawiedliwość) in the 2009 European Parliament elections and is not an official Libertas affiliate.)	N	Y	N		
Andrzej Marek Grzesik	Poland	Libertas Poland	Libertas Poland	N	Y	N		
Artur Wojciech Zawisza	Poland	Libertas Poland	Libertas Poland	N	Y	N		
Victor Patrzała	Poland	Libertas Poland	Libertas Poland	N	Y	N		
Wiesław Stefan Cichocki	Poland	Libertas Poland	ZChN	N	Y	N		
António Ferro	Portugal	Libertas Portugal	MPT	N	Y	N		
Maria Margarida Bettencourt	Portugal	Libertas Portugal	MPT	N	Y	N		
João Gonçalves	Portugal	Libertas Portugal	MPT	N	Y	N		
Manuel Moniz	Portugal	Libertas Portugal	MPT	N	Y	N		
Bárbara Viegas	Portugal	Libertas Portugal	MPT	N	Y	N		
Paulo Dias	Portugal	Libertas Portugal	MPT	N	Y	N		
Maria João Nogueira	Portugal	Libertas Portugal	MPT	N	Y	N		
Manuel Baptista	Portugal	Libertas Portugal	MPT	N	Y	N		
Jaime Pinto	Portugal	Libertas Portugal	MPT	N	Y	N		
Maria Clara Menéres	Portugal	Libertas Portugal	MPT	N	Y	N		
Alberto Mesquita	Portugal	Libertas Portugal	MPT	N	Y	N		
Carla Sousa	Portugal	Libertas Portugal	MPT	N	Y	N		
José Alexandre de Almeida	Portugal	Libertas Portugal	MPT	N	Y	N		
António Cardoso	Portugal	Libertas Portugal	MPT	N	Y	N		
Patrícia Rosa	Portugal	Libertas Portugal	MPT	N	Y	N		
Duarte Barracas	Portugal	Libertas Portugal	MPT	N	Y	N		
Catarina Martins	Portugal	Libertas Portugal	MPT	N	Y	N		
Jonh Baker	Portugal	Libertas Portugal	MPT	N	Y	N		
Manuel Santos	Portugal	Libertas Portugal	MPT	N	Y	N		
Maria da Conceição Figueiredo	Portugal	Libertas Portugal	MPT	N	Y	N		
José Faria	Portugal	Libertas Portugal	MPT	N	Y	N		
Pedro Simões José	Portugal	Libertas Portugal	MPT	N	Y	N		
Vladimír Palko	Slovakia	Libertas Slovakia	OKS or KDS	N	Y	N		
Peter Osuský	Slovakia	Libertas Slovakia	OKS or KDS	N	Y	N		
Alojz Rakús	Slovakia	Libertas Slovakia	OKS or KDS	N	Y	N		
Tibor Takác	Slovakia	Libertas Slovakia	OKS or KDS	N	Y	N		
František Mikloško	Slovakia	Libertas Slovakia	OKS or KDS	N	Y	N		
Pavol Minárik	Slovakia	Libertas Slovakia	OKS or KDS	N	Y	N		
Svetozár Gavora	Slovakia	Libertas Slovakia	OKS or KDS	N	Y	N		
Rudolf Bauer	Slovakia	Libertas Slovakia	OKS or KDS	N	Y	N		
Mária Majdová	Slovakia	Libertas Slovakia	OKS or KDS	N	Y	N		
Andrej Pavlík	Slovakia	Libertas Slovakia	OKS or KDS	N	Y	N		
Marcela Pcolinská	Slovakia	Libertas Slovakia	OKS or KDS	N	Y	N		
Karol Jadaš	Slovakia	Libertas Slovakia	OKS or KDS	N	Y	N		
Peter Jesenák	Slovakia	Libertas Slovakia	OKS or KDS	N	Y	N		
Miguel Duran Campos.	Spain	Libertas Spain	no party	N	N	Y		
José Manuel Villegas Pérez.	Spain	Libertas Spain	C or PSD or UPSa	N	Y	N		
Francisco García Ortuño.	Spain	Libertas Spain	C or PSD or UPSa	N	Y	N		
Beatriz Beneitez Pérez.	Spain	Libertas Spain	C or PSD or UPSa	N	Y	N		
Montserrat Navarro San Juan.	Spain	Libertas Spain	C or PSD or UPSa	N	Y	N		
Jesus María Poveda Agustin.	Spain	Libertas Spain	C or PSD or UPSa	N	Y	N		
Luis Fuentes Rodríguez	Spain	Libertas Spain	C or PSD or UPSa	N	Y	N		
José Luis Abascal Escudero.	Spain	Libertas Spain	C or PSD or UPSa	N	Y	N		
María Victoria Longares Alonso.	Spain	Libertas Spain	C or PSD or UPSa	N	Y	N		
Fuensanta Durante Martínez.	Spain	Libertas Spain	C or PSD or UPSa	N	Y	N		
Felix De La Fuente Pascual.	Spain	Libertas Spain	C or PSD or UPSa	N	Y	N		
José Francisco Otero Ferrer.	Spain	Libertas Spain	C or PSD or UPSa	N	Y	N		
Pablo Yañez González.	Spain	Libertas Spain	C or PSD or UPSa	N	Y	N		
María Inmaculada Pérez Sánchez.	Spain	Libertas Spain	C or PSD or UPSa	N	Y	N		
Mercedes Serrano García.	Spain	Libertas Spain	C or PSD or UPSa	N	Y	N		
Arturo Gómez Villalba.	Spain	Libertas Spain	C or PSD or UPSa	N	Y	N		
José Luis Blazquez Hidalgo.	Spain	Libertas Spain	C or PSD or UPSa	N	Y	N		
José Pla Lucas.	Spain	Libertas Spain	C or PSD or UPSa	N	Y	N		
María Pilar Del Barrio Gil De Gómez.	Spain	Libertas Spain	C or PSD or UPSa	N	Y	N		
María Elena Andrés Treinta.	Spain	Libertas Spain	C or PSD or UPSa	N	Y	N		
Luis Manuel Fernández Del Campo.	Spain	Libertas Spain	C or PSD or UPSa	N	Y	N		
Consuelo Alcocer Alonso.	Spain	Libertas Spain	C or PSD or UPSa	N	Y	N		
Graciela Álvarez Montero.	Spain	Libertas Spain	C or PSD or UPSa	N	Y	N		
Baltasar De Casanovas Hasburg Lothringen.	Spain	Libertas Spain	C or PSD or UPSa	N	Y	N		
María Enriqueta Rodríguez Valero.	Spain	Libertas Spain	C or PSD or UPSa	N	Y	N		
Agustina Lucia Martín Santos.	Spain	Libertas Spain	C or PSD or UPSa	N	Y	N		
Jorge García Mulet.	Spain	Libertas Spain	C or PSD or UPSa	N	Y	N		
María Candelas Pescador Gutiérrez.	Spain	Libertas Spain	C or PSD or UPSa	N	Y	N		
Raquel Sánchez Carrera.	Spain	Libertas Spain	C or PSD or UPSa	N	Y	N		
Julio Del Pozo Simarro.	Spain	Libertas Spain	C or PSD or UPSa	N	Y	N		
Ana Isabel González-Coria Dominguez.	Spain	Libertas Spain	C or PSD or UPSa	N	Y	N		
Victor Nicolas Angoy Sancho.	Spain	Libertas Spain	C or PSD or UPSa	N	Y	N		
Ángeles Menchen Collado.	Spain	Libertas Spain	C or PSD or UPSa	N	Y	N		
José María Abad Torres.	Spain	Libertas Spain	C or PSD or UPSa	N	Y	N		
Inmaculada Trujuillo Gómez.	Spain	Libertas Spain	C or PSD or UPSa	N	Y	N		
Elvira Mendez Duran.	Spain	Libertas Spain	C or PSD or UPSa	N	Y	N		
Diego Esteban García.	Spain	Libertas Spain	C or PSD or UPSa	N	Y	N		
María Aranzazu La Porte Fernández-Alfaro.	Spain	Libertas Spain	C or PSD or UPSa	N	Y	N		
Ruth Lortzing Queralt.	Spain	Libertas Spain	C or PSD or UPSa	N	Y	N		
Jaime Muñoz Patiño.	Spain	Libertas Spain	C or PSD or UPSa	N	Y	N		
Antonio Díaz Lara.	Spain	Libertas Spain	C or PSD or UPSa	N	Y	N		
María Eugenia Rivera González De Rivera.	Spain	Libertas Spain	C or PSD or UPSa	N	Y	N		
Aldo Ciprian Rodríguez.	Spain	Libertas Spain	C or PSD or UPSa	N	Y	N		
Pedro José Elhombre Montañes.	Spain	Libertas Spain	C or PSD or UPSa	N	Y	N		
Ángeles Ribes Duarte.	Spain	Libertas Spain	C or PSD or UPSa	N	Y	N		
María Luisa Rodríguez Cabezas.	Spain	Libertas Spain	C or PSD or UPSa	N	Y	N		
José Vicente Fernández Abril.	Spain	Libertas Spain	C or PSD or UPSa	N	Y	N		
Peter Schwenzer Pfau.	Spain	Libertas Spain	C or PSD or UPSa	N	Y	N		
Nelida Sanchidrian González.	Spain	Libertas Spain	C or PSD or UPSa	N	Y	N		
Jesus Fraile Martín.	Spain	Libertas Spain	C or PSD or UPSa	N	Y	N		
Richard Peter Elvin	United Kingdom	Libertas United Kingdom	Pro-Democracy: Libertas.eu	Y	N	N	East Midlands	
Margaret Lucille Jeanne Parker	United Kingdom	Libertas United Kingdom	Pro-Democracy: Libertas.eu	Y	N	N	East Midlands	
Peter Chaplin	United Kingdom	Libertas United Kingdom	Pro-Democracy: Libertas.eu	Y	N	N	East Midlands	
James Arthur Graham Daniels	United Kingdom	Libertas United Kingdom	Pro-Democracy: Libertas.eu	Y	N	N	East Midlands	
William Gordon Stuart Winter	United Kingdom	Libertas United Kingdom	Pro-Democracy: Libertas.eu	Y	N	N	East Midlands	
Andrew David Jamieson	United Kingdom	Libertas United Kingdom	Pro-Democracy: Libertas.eu	Y	N	N	East of England	
Peter Mason	United Kingdom	Libertas United Kingdom	Pro-Democracy: Libertas.eu	Y	N	N	East of England	
John Leroy Dowdale	United Kingdom	Libertas United Kingdom	Pro-Democracy: Libertas.eu	Y	N	N	East of England	
Carlo de Chair	United Kingdom	Libertas United Kingdom	Pro-Democracy: Libertas.eu	Y	N	N	East of England	
Henry Thomas Burton	United Kingdom	Libertas United Kingdom	Pro-Democracy: Libertas.eu	Y	N	N	East of England	
John Robert Harmer	United Kingdom	Libertas United Kingdom	Pro-Democracy: Libertas.eu	Y	N	N	East of England	
Peter Ignatius Robbins	United Kingdom	Libertas United Kingdom	Pro-Democracy: Libertas.eu	Y	N	N	East of England	
Maxwell John Burt	United Kingdom	Libertas United Kingdom	Pro-Democracy: Libertas.eu	Y	N	N	London	
Susannah Ellen Muffley Prins	United Kingdom	Libertas United Kingdom	Pro-Democracy: Libertas.eu	Y	N	N	London	
Peter Desmond Clifford Lloyd	United Kingdom	Libertas United Kingdom	Pro-Democracy: Libertas.eu	Y	N	N	London	
Herbert Widford Crossman	United Kingdom	Libertas United Kingdom	Pro-Democracy: Libertas.eu	Y	N	N	London	
Victoria Jane Wood	United Kingdom	Libertas United Kingdom	Pro-Democracy: Libertas.eu	Y	N	N	London	
Alan Lewis Radlett	United Kingdom	Libertas United Kingdom	Pro-Democracy: Libertas.eu	Y	N	N	London	
Manesh Padhiar	United Kingdom	Libertas United Kingdom	Pro-Democracy: Libertas.eu	Y	N	N	London	
Paul Cuthbert Forrester	United Kingdom	Libertas United Kingdom	Pro-Democracy: Libertas.eu	Y	N	N	London	
Ken Rollings	United Kingdom	Libertas United Kingdom	Pro-Democracy: Libertas.eu	Y	N	N	North East	
Alasdair Mcleod	United Kingdom	Libertas United Kingdom	Pro-Democracy: Libertas.eu	Y	N	N	North East	
William Tremlett	United Kingdom	Libertas United Kingdom	Pro-Democracy: Libertas.eu	Y	N	N	North East	
Anthony Butcher	United Kingdom	Libertas United Kingdom	Pro-Democracy: Libertas.eu	Y	N	N	North West	
Paul John Debrowa	United Kingdom	Libertas United Kingdom	Pro-Democracy: Libertas.eu	Y	N	N	North West	
William James Westall	United Kingdom	Libertas United Kingdom	Pro-Democracy: Libertas.eu	Y	N	N	North West	
Liam Hemmings	United Kingdom	Libertas United Kingdom	Pro-Democracy: Libertas.eu	Y	N	N	North West	
John Malcolm Humberstone	United Kingdom	Libertas United Kingdom	Pro-Democracy: Libertas.eu	Y	N	N	North West	
Michael Brendon O'Reilly	United Kingdom	Libertas United Kingdom	Pro-Democracy: Libertas.eu	Y	N	N	North West	
Kevin Phillip O'Connell	United Kingdom	Libertas United Kingdom	Pro-Democracy: Libertas.eu	Y	N	N	South East	
Daniel Walter Hill	United Kingdom	Libertas United Kingdom	Pro-Democracy: Libertas.eu	Y	N	N	South East	
Neil Martin Glass	United Kingdom	Libertas United Kingdom	Pro-Democracy: Libertas.eu	Y	N	N	South East	
Chloe Elizabeth Woodhead	United Kingdom	Libertas United Kingdom	Pro-Democracy: Libertas.eu	Y	N	N	South East	
Guy James Lambert	United Kingdom	Libertas United Kingdom	Pro-Democracy: Libertas.eu	Y	N	N	South East	
Grahame Leon-Smith	United Kingdom	Libertas United Kingdom	Pro-Democracy: Libertas.eu	Y	N	N	South East	
Peter James Darien Grace	United Kingdom	Libertas United Kingdom	Pro-Democracy: Libertas.eu	Y	N	N	South East	
Nicholas Heather	United Kingdom	Libertas United Kingdom	Pro-Democracy: Libertas.eu	Y	N	N	South East	
David Robert Peace	United Kingdom	Libertas United Kingdom	Pro-Democracy: Libertas.eu	Y	N	N	South East	
Robin Charles Matthews	United Kingdom	Libertas United Kingdom	Pro-Democracy: Libertas.eu	Y	N	N	South West	
Peter Charles Albert Morgan-Barnes	United Kingdom	Libertas United Kingdom	Pro-Democracy: Libertas.eu	Y	N	N	South West	
Chloe Gwynne	United Kingdom	Libertas United Kingdom	Pro-Democracy: Libertas.eu	Y	N	N	South West	
Christopher Charnock	United Kingdom	Libertas United Kingdom	Pro-Democracy: Libertas.eu	Y	N	N	South West	
Nicholas Carlton Collingwood Sherman	United Kingdom	Libertas United Kingdom	Pro-Democracy: Libertas.eu	Y	N	N	South West	
Nicholas Charles Sacheverell Coke	United Kingdom	Libertas United Kingdom	Pro-Democracy: Libertas.eu	Y	N	N	South West	
Jimmy Millard	United Kingdom	Libertas United Kingdom	Pro-Democracy: Libertas.eu	Y	N	N	West Midlands	
Bridget Ilona Rose	United Kingdom	Libertas United Kingdom	Pro-Democracy: Libertas.eu	Y	N	N	West Midlands	
Zigi Stuart Davenport	United Kingdom	Libertas United Kingdom	Pro-Democracy: Libertas.eu	Y	N	N	West Midlands	
Andrew Ian Bebbington	United Kingdom	Libertas United Kingdom	Pro-Democracy: Libertas.eu	Y	N	N	West Midlands	
David William Black	United Kingdom	Libertas United Kingdom	Pro-Democracy: Libertas.eu	Y	N	N	West Midlands	
Matthew Hugh Lingard	United Kingdom	Libertas United Kingdom	Pro-Democracy: Libertas.eu	Y	N	N	West Midlands	
Anthony John Devoy	United Kingdom	Libertas United Kingdom	Pro-Democracy: Libertas.eu	Y	N	N	Yorkshire and the Humber	
Edward Francis Devoy	United Kingdom	Libertas United Kingdom	Pro-Democracy: Libertas.eu	Y	N	N	Yorkshire and the Humber	
Stephen Andrew Clark	United Kingdom	Libertas United Kingdom	Pro-Democracy: Libertas.eu	Y	N	N	Yorkshire and the Humber	
Diana MacLeod	United Kingdom	Libertas United Kingdom	Pro-Democracy: Libertas.eu	Y	N	N	Yorkshire and the Humber	
Trevor John Bending	United Kingdom	Libertas United Kingdom	Pro-Democracy: Libertas.eu	Y	N	N	Yorkshire and the Humber	
Kathleen Harris	United Kingdom	Libertas United Kingdom	Pro-Democracy: Libertas.eu	Y	N	N	Yorkshire and the Humber	
