= Libertas (disambiguation) =

Libertas (Latin for 'liberty' or 'freedom') is the Roman goddess and personification of liberty.

Libertas may also refer to:

== Places ==
- Libertas (island), of the Fjäderholmarna group, Sweden
- Libertas (star) or Xi Aquilae
- Mahlamba Ndlopfu, formerly Libertas, the residence of the President of South Africa
- Libertas, the home of Adam Tas (1668–1722) in the Cape Colony

== Politics ==
- Libertas (Norway), a Norwegian libertarian business organisation
- Libertas Academica, an open access journal publisher
- Libertas Institute (Utah), a think tank in the U.S.
- Libertas (monument), commemorating the Estonian War of Independence
- Libertas Institute (Ireland), an Irish lobby group who campaigned for "no" in the 2008 referendum
- Libertas.eu, a European political party in 2008–2010

- Libertas (Czech Republic)
- Libertas Estonia
- Libertas France
- Libertas Greece
- Libertas Germany
- Libertas Ireland
- Libertas Italy
- Libertas Latvia
- Libertas Lithuania
- Libertas Malta
- Libertas Netherlands
- Libertas Poland
- Libertas Portugal
- Libertas Slovakia
- Libertas Spain
- Libertas Sweden
- Libertas United Kingdom

== Sports ==
- A.C. Libertas, a Sanmarinese football club
- Libertas, a predecessor of Viareggio Calcio
- Libertas S.C., a predecessor of S.S. Cavese 1919
- P.G. Libertas, an Italian football club
- Libertas (cycling team) 1952–1967
- Libertas Acate-Modica, an Italian football club
- Libertas Liburnia Basket Livorno, an Italian basketball team
- Libertas Pallacanestro Asti, an Italian basketball club
- Libertas Trogylos Basket, an Italian basketball club

== Other uses ==
- Libertas (film), a 2006 Croatian-Italian film
- Liberty Film Festival 2004–2008, and the online continuation Libertas Film Magazine
- Marvell Libertas, an open source wireless driver
- Professional Business School of Higher Education LIBERTAS, in Croatia
- Libertas Schulze-Boysen (1913–1942), German aristocrat and resistance fighter

== See also ==
- Liberta (disambiguation)
- Liberty (disambiguation)
- Freedom (disambiguation)
- Libertas convoy, a humanitarian action during the siege of Dubrovnik in 1991
- Republic of Ragusa, whose flag features "Libertas"
