= Libertas.eu =

Former Eurosceptic European political party

- President: Declan Ganley
- Founded: 30 October 2008 (Note: The CRO Archived 29 December 2010 at the Wayback Machine entry for the Libertas Party gives these details: Type: Company; Number: 463758; Name: The Libertas Party Limited, Address: Moyne Park, Tuam, County Galway, Ireland; Registered: 30 October 2008)
- Dissolved: September 2010
- Headquarters: Registered at Moyne Park, Tuam, County Galway, Ireland; European offices on 7th Floor, Avenue de Cortenbergh 71, Brussels 1000, Belgium
- Ideology: Anti-Lisbon Treaty
- European Parliament group: Europe of Freedom and Democracy
- Colours: Blue, gold

Website
- www.libertas.eu

Libertas was a European political party founded by Declan Ganley that took part in the 2009 European Parliament election in several member states of the European Union. It won one seat in France.

== History ==
=== Creation ===
In 2008, the Libertas Institute Limited, a lobby group founded by Declan Ganley and others, advocated a "no" vote in Lisbon I, the 2008 referendum in Ireland on the Treaty of Lisbon. Lisbon I failed. The referendum was held on 12 June 2008 and defeated by 53.4% to 46.6%, with a turnout of 53.1%.

Libertas held a post-referendum celebration in the Burlington Hotel in Dublin on the night of Friday, 13 June 2008. Attending that celebration was Danish Eurosceptic and former President of the EUDemocrats and recently retired MEP Jens-Peter Bonde, who had been a "no" campaigner during the referendum. Bonde was later cited as one of the main architects of the upgrading of Libertas to a European political party.

On 15 July 2008, RTÉ News on Two covered Ganley's comments at The Heritage Foundation in Washington, D.C., where he stated that Libertas intended running as a European political party. The next day Ganley confirmed that Libertas was fundraising in order to run candidates throughout Europe in the 2009 European Parliament elections.

On 20 September 2008, The Irish Times reported that Bonde and Czech president Václav Klaus pledged to help Ganley to launch Libertas. The two were later amongst the guests at a dinner hosted by Ganley at the Shelbourne Hotel in Dublin on 11 November 2008.

On 30 October 2008, Ganley registered a company based in Moyne Park, Tuam, County Galway called the Libertas Party Limited. The Irish Times reported that the new party was intended to "carry on the business of a European political party". The party was publicly announced in December 2008 with ambitions to field up to 400 candidates and win seats in all 27 EU member states.

In early 2009, Libertas applied to be recognised by the European Parliament as a Europena political party. The application was briefly successful; however, it was suspended indefinitely amidst controversy.

=== Pan-European expansion ===
Ganley then travelled around Europe to set up Libertas lists and parties for the 2009 European Parliament election. In November 2008 Libertas opened its Brussels office. Libertas launched in France on 12 February 2009, the Netherlands on 15 April, followed by several other European Union member states. On 1 May 2009, Libertas held its first pan-European convention in Rome in time for the European Parliament elections in June, when it fielded hundreds of candidates for election.

==== Austria ====
In Austria, Libertas was rejected by both Freedom Party of Austria (FPÖ) and Alliance for the Future of Austria (BZÖ) as well as by the independent Hans-Peter Martin. Martin announced after talks and serious considerations, that he would rather remain independent, which he successfully did. FPÖ harshly rebuffed Ganley's advances associating his activism with an alleged American conspiracy. The initially noncommital BZÖ later also declined, preferring a loose cooperation in the European Parliament.

==== Bulgaria ====
An electoral list called "Libertas: Free Citizens" (Bulgarian: Либертас: Свободните граждани) was formed by some 30 national and local Non-governmental organizations. Pavel Chernev's Freedom Party that had announced to join the list was repudiated by Libertas. However, the submitted list was later rejected by the Bulgarian electoral commission. An appeal filed by Nikolay Bliznakov was turned down by Bulgaria's Supreme Administrative Court on the grounds that the list had not proven the required deposit had not given the names of its constituent parties. In the meantime, Bulgarian businessman Hristo Atanassov founded a party under the name Libertas Bulgaria which has no connection to the Libertas network.

==== Czech Republic ====
Right after the preliminary rejection of the Lisbon Treaty in Ireland, Declan Ganley, founder of the European Libertas.eu, was guest of Czech President Václav Klaus The Czech eStat.cz civic group had ambitions to replicate Libertas's success and awarded the Irish electorate the Michal Tošovský Prize, picked up by Ganley in Prague on 5 November 2008. During his stay in Ireland after a state visit, Klaus visited Ganley in a private capacity and later attended the Shelbourne Hotel dinner given by Ganley for leading Eurosceptics.

However, Ganley's Libertas was later rejected by the new Czech Eurosceptic party, Petr Mach's Party of Free Citizens, which was endorsed by Klaus. Additionally, the Ganley-disavowed new Czech Eurosceptic party by Vladimír Železný usurped the Libertas brand by registering itself as Libertas.cz. Ganley's Libertas later claimed Železný's Libertas as an affiliate.

==== Greece ====
After Manolis Kalligiannis (Greek: Μανώλης Καλλιγιάννης), President of the Greek Liberal Party had attended Libertas.eu's Rome convention on 1 May 2009. Manolis Kalligiannis (Μανώλης Καλλιγιάννης, sometimes rendered in English as Emmanuel Kalligiannis), Liberal Party run for the 2009 European parliament election under a Libertas-affiliated list with the name "Κόμμα Φιλελευθέρων – Libertas.eu".

==== Hungary ====
In Hungary, Libertas.eu searched for candidates in an Internet ad and Károly Lóránt was appointed the Hungarian representative. However, as Hungarian concerns that a disorganized EU would only serve Russian strategic interests could not be dissipated, no list was fielded on behalf of Libertas.

==== Italy ====
Libertas.eu announced talks with the Pole of Autonomy coalition on 30 April 2009, the day before its Rome convention, which were confirmed the next day by Teodoro Buontempo, the president of The Right. However, in the final candidate lists submitted in May, no candidates were fielded by Libertas.eu, neither did the Pole of Autonomy list refer to Libertas.

==== Lithuania ====
Ganley arrived in Vilnius on Tuesday 3 March 2009 to discuss terms with prospective candidates, and explore whether to establish a new Libertas party in Lithuania or change the name of an existing Lithuanian party. He did so again on Monday 24 March 2009 at a lecture at Vilnius University's Institute of International Relations and Political Science (IIRPS, or VU Tarptautinių Santykių ir Politikos Mokslų Institutas, VU TSPMI).

On 31 March 2008, Libertas Lithuania gave a press conference. Attendees at the press conference were Ganley, lawyer Eugenija Sutkienė, political analyst and Lithuanian presidential advisor Lauras Bielinis, and Tautos Prisikėlimo Partija representative Saulius Stoma.

In that press conference, it was announced that the Libertas Lithuanian list would be headed by Sutkiene and would include Bielinis, and that candidates from the Tautos Prisikėlimo Partija would stand with them under a common list, although Ganley and Stoma disagreed whether other parties would join them under that list. When asked if he had read the Lisbon Treaty, Bielinis demurred. When asked about Libertas Lithuania's funding, Ganley demurred.

Bielinis planned to remain in his presidential advisory post until 7 May 2009 and take unpaid leave thereafter. Lithuanian President Valdas Adamkus disagreed and announced Bielinis' resignation the next day, 1 April 2009.

When the lists were published, neither Bielinis nor Sutkiene were on Tautos Prisikėlimo Partija's list. When Libertas named their finalised candidates in May 2009, they did not include any candidates in Lithuania, and the Tautos Prisikėlimo Partija website contained no pledge of allegiance to Libertas.

==== Portugal ====
In April 2009, the Portuguese ecologist Earth Party (MPT) announced in a joint press conference with Ganley that it would run for the 2009 European Parliament election with an open electoral list under the banner of Libertas.eu.

==== Slovakia ====
While the vice-president of the EUDemocrats, Peter Kopecký had already announced the foundation of a Libertas Slovensko branch, he changed his mind in late February and decided to head the list of the small, but already established Agrarian and Countryside Party. Ganley had to look out to other options and met in Bratislava with leaders of the conservative parties KDS and OKS, and with Richard Sulík, the founder of the new (Sloboda a Solidarita). While Sulík, whom Ganley had already contacted before, still didn't show much interest, Vladimír Palko (KDS) agreed to bring in their joint list with OKS into the European network. However, as the two partys didn't want to give up their distinct identities, they used Libertas only as supplementary brand.

=== Endgame ===
Libertas fielded over 600 candidates (including substitutes), but only one was elected: Phillippe de Villiers. Although Ganley himself polled a respectable number of votes, it was not enough for him to take a seat in his constituency. Ganley requested a recount of his personal vote but still lost. Having made the promise to do so before the election, Ganley retired from politics following his defeat on 8 June 2009: the fate of the party he founded, chaired, owned and governed was left to others. However, the affiliated Libertas Institute did emerge again in the Republic of Ireland when the Irish government launched its re-run of the Lisbon Treaty, despite its defeat the previous year. The Libertas party, along with the other minority political groupings, such as the Socialist Party and Sinn Féin, which opposed the European Constitutional Amending Bill, were outspent and outperformed by the political proponents of the bill who won by a substantial majority. Declan Ganley went on to praise the Irish Prime Minister, or Taoiseach, on 'what was, politically, a masterful campaign...from a masterful politician who has made glove puppets out of the opposition' although Ganley also cited recent economic turmoil in the country as a major deciding factor in the vote.

== Staff ==
Name	Position	Notes
Declan Ganley	Chairman	Unelected
Jens-Peter Bonde	Brussels Office Manager	
Joe Trippi	Electoral consultant	American Democratic campaign consultant. Worked on the presidential campaigns of Edward Kennedy, Walter Mondale, Gary Hart, Dick Gephardt, and John Edwards.
Lynton Crosby	Electoral consultant	Australian campaign consultant. Worked on the election campaigns of John Howard, Michael Howard, and Boris Johnson.
Anita Kelly	Spokesperson	
John McGuirk	Spokesperson	Was named as a Libertas spokesperson in Slovakia in February 2009.

== Structure ==
Libertas's intended structure evolved with time. It was originally intended to be an alliance of national parties, but it was later envisaged as a single European political party with candidates running as individual members of Libertas. By the end of April 2009, Libertas's structure had settled into a loose association of national member parties (either new or pre-existing), with each member party adhering to a set of core principles (see below) but retaining its independence and adding on additional policies as it felt appropriate.

For the purposes of contending the 2009 European Parliament elections, Libertas candidates ran under lists (the lists of candidates presented to voters in a European election) branded with the Libertas identity, as exemplified by the French approach. Each list was made up of some combination of the following:

- members of member parties
- members of affiliate parties (parties that were not members of Libertas.eu but cooperated with it electorally)
- individual members (people who chose to join Libertas.eu as individuals).

New national member parties established by Libertas had names in the "Libertas X" format, e.g. "Libertas Sweden" (except in the UK). (Note: The UK could not adopt a "Libertas X" format name because that name had already been registered with the Electoral Commission. The Libertas.eu member parties in the UK are "Pro-Democracy: Libertas.eu" and "Libertas Northern Ireland") Pre-existing national member parties were asked to change their names to include the word "Libertas" in the title. Members of member parties were members of Libertas automatically unless they chose otherwise.

Affiliate parties retained their original names. Members of affiliate parties were not members of Libertas unless they chose to join as individuals.

== Position ==
Ganley stated that following a group conference in Rome in March 2009, (later postponed to 1 May 2009) Libertas would publish a policy document or party manifesto. covering areas such as democracy, the economy, small businesses, the recession, and EU institution accountability.

No formal manifesto was published at the convention. Instead, Libertas's core principles were displayed on its website and reiterated at its convention, namely accountability, transparency, democracy and rejection of the Lisbon Treaty. Each member party and individual member was obliged to adhere to these core principles, although they could add additional policies as they felt appropriate. Affiliate parties were not obliged to so adhere.

The core principles were given concrete form when Libertas published the following policies on its website:

- The powers of legislative initiative, inspection and decision should be reserved to elected officials.
- Expenses of the European Parliament and European Commission to be published.
- European Commission to identify €10 billion in savings for financial year 2010/11.
- Any given Constitution Treaty to be ratified by referendums in each member state.
- Meetings in Brussels (Note: Whether the term "Brussels" was used here to refer to the seat of the European Commission in Brussels, or to the seat of the European Parliament in Brussels, or to the seat of the Council of the European Union in Brussels, or to all of these, was not specified.) to be reduced by 50%.

== Membership ==
=== Member parties ===
Member parties were members of Libertas.eu. Members of member parties were automatically members of Libertas.eu unless they chose otherwise.

Estonia

- Libertas Estonia

Germany

- Libertas Germany

Ireland

- Libertas Ireland

Malta

- Libertas Malta

Netherlands

- Libertas Netherlands

Poland

- Libertas Poland

Sweden

- Libertas Sweden

United Kingdom

- Libertas United Kingdom

Latvia

- Libertas Latvia

=== Affiliate parties ===
Affiliate parties were not members of Libertas.eu but cooperated with it electorally under Libertas lists. Members of affiliate parties were not members of Libertas.eu unless they chose to join as individuals.

Bulgaria

- Svoboda (Свобода, SVOBODA)

Czech Republic

- Libertas.cz
- Independent Democrats (Nezávislí demokraté, NEZDEM)

France

- Movement for France (Mouvement pour la France, MPF)
- Hunting, Fishing, Nature, Tradition (Chasse, Pêche, Nature, Traditions, CPNT)

Germany

- Party of Work, Nature and Family - Christians for Germany (Partei für Arbeit, Umwelt und Familie – Christen für Deutschland, AUF)

Greece

- Liberal Party (Komma Fileleftheron, KF)

Poland

- Forward Poland (Naprzód Polsko, NP)
- Polish People's Party "Piast" (Polskie Stronnictwo Ludowe "Piast", PSL Piast)
- Party of Regions (Partia Regionów, PR)
- League of Polish Families (Liga Polskich Rodzin, LPR)
- Organization of the Polish Nation - League of Poland (Organizacja Narodu Polskiego - Liga Polska, ONP-LP)
- Christian-National Union (Zjednoczenie Chrześcijańsko-Narodowe, ZChN)

Portugal

- Earth Party (Partido da Terra, PT), formerly the Movement the Earth Party (Movimento Partido da Terra, MPT)

Slovakia

- KDS-OKS coalition

- Civic Conservative Party (Občianska Konzervatívna Strana, OKS)
- Conservative Democrats of Slovakia (Konzervatívni Demokrati Slovenska, KDS)

- Agrarian and Countryside Party

Spain

- Citizens – Party of the Citizenry (Ciudadanos-Partido de la Ciudadanía, C)
- Social Democratic Party (Partido Social Demócrata, PSD)
- People's Union of Salamanca (Unión del Pueblo Salmantino, UPSa)

=== Individual members ===
Individual members were people who chose to join Libertas.eu as individuals. People with no national party membership who were running under a Libertas list were automatically individual members.

== 2009 European Parliament elections ==
Libertas didn't manage to present electoral lists in Austria, Belgium, Bulgaria, Cyprus, Denmark, Finland, Hungary, Italy, Luxembourg, Lithuania, Romania and Sweden. In the other European countries, the candidates on Libertas.eu's lists were either members of member parties, members of affiliate parties, or individual members.

Member state	Libertas list	Number of seats contested 4–7 June 2009	Elected candidates 8 June 2009
Czech Republic	Libertas (Czech Republic)	29	0
Estonia	Libertas Estonia	6	0
France	Libertas France	147	1
Germany	Libertas Germany	11 (Note: Libertas's website gives a total of 22 people, made up of 11 actual candidates (Bewerber) and their 11 substitute candidates (Ersatzbewerber). Substitute candidates, (a.k.a. "alternates" or "replacements") were those people who replace the elected candidate if s/he dies or is otherwise disqualified from sitting in the European Parliament)	0
Greece	Libertas Greece	22	0
Ireland	Libertas Ireland	3	0
Latvia	Libertas Latvia	8	0
Malta	Libertas Malta	1	0
Netherlands	Libertas Netherlands	24	0
Poland	Libertas Poland	128 (Note: Kazimierz Wilk and Barbara Czyż resigned from Libertas, reducing the originally-reported total of 130 by two)	0
Portugal	Libertas Portugal	22	0
Slovakia	Libertas Slovakia	13	0
Spain	Libertas Spain	50	0
United Kingdom	Libertas United Kingdom	56 (Note: Benjamin Caradoc Tallis resigned from Libertas, reducing the originally-reported total of 57 by one)	0

== Commonality with other organizations ==
Libertas was registered at Moyne Park, Tuam, County Galway along with other organisations associated with Libertas and/or Declan Ganley. A list of organizations associated with Libertas.eu and/or Declan Ganley is given here.

== See also ==
- Jens-Peter Bonde
- Declan Ganley
- 2009 European Parliament election
- Treaty of Lisbon
- European political party
- Authority for European Political Parties and European Political Foundations
- European political foundation
