= Liberta =

Liberta may refer to:

== Places ==
- Liberta, Antigua

== Music ==
- "Liberta" (2003 song), a 2003 song by Pep's
- "Libertà!" (1987 song) a 1987 song by Al Bano and Romina Power
- Libertà! (1987 album) a 1987 album by Al Bano and Romina Power

== Other uses ==
- Dacia 1325 Liberta, a car made by Dacia
- Liberty/Libertà, a 2019 exhibition by the sculptor Martin Puryear at the Venice Biennale's American pavilion

== See also ==
- Libertas (disambiguation)
- Liberty (disambiguation)
