= Libertas Spain =

Libertas Spain (Libertas España) is the name given to the activities of Declan Ganley's Libertas.eu in Spain. Unlike Libertas in other countries, Libertas Spain was not a political party in its own right. Instead, candidates with no national party affiliation and candidates from Citizens – Party of the Citizenry, Partido Social Demócrata and Unión del Pueblo Salmantino contended the 2009 European Parliament elections in Spain under a common list branded with the Libertas identity. The candidates retained their membership of their national parties and the national parties retained their legal identity.

== Preamble ==
On 15 February Ganley gave an interview to ABC in which he announced that Libertas.eu intended to field candidates in Spain. Rumored Libertas.eu candidates were Santiago Abascal, (but Abascal rejected Libertas.eu) Alejo Vidal-Quadras, José Luis Balbás and José Manuel Otero Novas. It was also rumored that Libertas.eu candidates in Spain would stand in alliance with Alternativa Española under a list entitled "Plataforma Principios No Negociables" and that contacts had been made with Cadena COPE.

== Formation ==
Libertas.eu scheduled an official press conference for 17 April 2009 but details began to be leaked on 15 April 2009. Libertas.eu's candidates in Spain would stand as individuals alongside candidates from Citizens – Party of the Citizenry (usually abbreviated to "C's") under a common list branded with the Libertas identity. The name of the list was variously reported as Ciutadans en las Europeas or Libertas – Ciudadanos de España or Ciudadanos – Partido de la Ciudadanía y Libertas.

"C"'s original plan was to place Jose Manuel Villegas at the head of the list, but this was abandoned. Instead, Villegas was put at number two on the list and the head of the list was named as Miguel Durán. Miguel Durán is a lawyer and businessman. He was the general manager of the National Organization of the Spanish Blind, from 1986 to 1993, the director of Telecinco from 1990 to 1996 and of Onda Cero Radio from 1990 to 1993. Miguel Durán was charged in 1997 by the judge Baltasar Garzón for alleged tax crimes committed during his time at Telecinco but was later acquitted. He is not a member of Citizens – Party of the Citizenry but is running as an individual member of Libertas.eu.

The official press conference took place on 17 April 2009 and "C" later issued a communique giving the principles under which the list would contend the election. The list was registered with Spain's Central Electoral Commission under the name Libertas – Ciudadanos de España.

== Split ==
Antonio Robles Almeida, "C's" member of the Catalan Parliament, promptly objected, stating that he could not justify an alliance with a party that was diametrically opposed to "C's" position on xenophobia and social liberal issues such as freedom of sexual orientation, abortion, contraception, assisted suicide and stem cell research. José Domingo also objected.

"C's" alliance with Libertas was subject to approval by an April extraordinary session of "C's" General Council, although Robles stated that party chairman, Albert Rivera had already approved it and that the election office and money were already in place. That extraordinary session approved the alliance and Robles immediately resigned his party membership.

== See also ==
- Jens-Peter Bonde
- Declan Ganley
- 2009 European Parliament election
- Treaty of Lisbon
