= Libertas Poland =

Libertas Polska
- Leader: Originally Daniel Pawłowiec later Declan Ganley
- Founded: ~2006/7 (as Pawlowiec's Lewica i Demokraci); 2 February 2009. (announced as Libertas Polska); 24 February 2009 (renamed to Libertas Polska)
- Dissolved: 2014
- Headquarters: Aleje Ujazdowskie 22/3, 00-478 Warsaw
- Ideology: Anti-Lisbon Treaty; Euroscepticism
- European affiliation: Libertas Party Limited
- European Parliament group: none
- Colours: blue, gold

Website
- referendumdlapolski.pl

Libertas Poland (Libertas Polska, LP) was a political party in Poland. It contended the 2009 European Parliament elections under a common banner with Libertas Party Limited, the organization founded by Declan Ganley.

== Pawlowiec's Lewica i Demokraci ==
Before the 2007 Polish parliamentary election, three LPR then-members, Cyprian Gutkowski, Daniel Pawłowiec and Sebastian Jargut, registered a party called Lewica i Demokraci, (Left and Democrats). The party was a party-in-name-only designed to frustrate the party of the same name, which was forced to register itself as SLD+SdPl+PD+UP – Lewica i Demokraci (LiD) instead.

Declan Ganley visited Poland on Friday 9 January 2009 to discuss terms for the formation of the Poland branch of Libertas with representatives from Forward Poland (NP), PSL Piast and Prawica Rzeczypospolitej (PR). Ganley insisted that the Poland Libertas party used the word "Libertas" in the title but the party politicians were concerned that the non-Polish name would deter voters. The name "Forward Poland – Libertas" (Naprzód Polsko – Libertas) was suggested as a compromise name should NP decide to ally with Libertas.

On 1 February 2009, Ganley spoke to the inaugural Warsaw meeting of the Referendum Committee (Komitetu Referendalnego), an organization advocating that referendums be held prior to treaty ratifications by Poland. The speech was filmed and placed on YouTube (prolog, part 1, part 2). The meeting attendance was estimated at 700 or 500 and attendees included Mirosław Orzechowski (LPR), Zdzisław Podkański (PSL), Krzysztof Filipek and Danuta Hojarska (once Samoobrona, now Party of Regions) and Antoni Tyszka (UPR), Konrad Bonisławski (head of All-Polish Youth) and Krzysztof Bosak (former LPR MP).

On 2 February 2009 a press conference was given in which the head of the Referendum Committee, former LPR MP Daniel Pawłowiec, was named as head of Libertas Poland (Libertas Polska, LP), and the Referendum Committee offices at Aleje Ujazdowskie 22/3, 00-478 Warsaw were named as the headquarters of Libertas Poland.

Although the party had been announced, it did not exist under that name at that point: registering a political party in Poland is a lengthy process. Instead, Pawlowiec's Lewica i Demokraci was renamed to Libertas Polska, the new name being registered on 24 February 2009

== Position ==
On 11 February 2009, Libertas Poland held a press conference concerning the emergency meeting of the European Council. In that press conference, Libertas Poland demanded that the Polish government should reduce VAT following the UK example, propose an EU joint energy policy, and reopen the labor markets of Germany and Austria to Polish workers.

== Affiliates ==
Libertas attempted to get other parties to affiliate (run candidates under a common list) to it. Libertas's search for affiliates was assisted by Roman Giertych and Wojciech Wierzejski, with Wierzejski resigning from the leadership of LPR to devote his time to the unification of the Polish patriotic, nationalist, conservative and Christian right under a Libertas list.

=== Parties that did affiliate to Libertas ===
The parties that affiliated with Libertas Poland and the parent organization Libertas.eu are as follows:

- Forward Poland and PSL Piast

Forward Poland (Naprzód Polsko, NP) originally rejected cooperation with Libertas because they felt that Libertas did not reflect their desire for a more independent Poland. PSL Piast (a.k.a. Stronnictwo "Piast") also initially rejected cooperation with Libertas for similar reasons to Forward Poland and because the party did not have a Polish name. Instead, the two parties planned to run their own combined list (Naprzód Polsko – Piast) in the 2009 elections.

But the two parties eventually decided to affiliate to Libertas and candidates from the two parties appeared on the Libertas lists. The decision to affiliate was not unanimously welcomed within the two parties.

There was a controversy involving allegations of forged signatures in constituency number 11 and the Naprzód Polsko – Piast list did field candidates in that constituency.

- Partia Regionów

Partia Regionów considered running under a Libertas list. Partia Regionów's president, Bolesław Borysiuk, negotiated cooperation with Libertas Polska and he announced in PR's inaugural Congress that PR's candidates were likely to run under a Libertas list alongside Libertas Polska, and this did in fact occur.

- League of Polish Families

As of 9 March 2009, League of Polish Families (LPR) were still considering whether to run under a Libertas list or form their own, either by themselves or with UPR, or Prawica Rzeczypospolitej. But by 19 March, Ganley was distancing Libertas from LPR. Nevertheless, Libertas and LPR were still in ongoing discussions on Friday 27 March 2009 about running under a common list. By 21 April 2009, LPR had agreed to affiliate to Libertas and their candidates did run under the Libertas list instead of their own list in the 2009 European Parliament elections.

- Organizacja Narodu Polskiego – Liga Polska

Organizacja Narodu Polskiego – Liga Polska affiliated to Libertas.

- Zjednoczenie Chrześcijańsko-Narodowe

Zjednoczenie Chrześcijańsko-Narodowe (ZChN) affiliated to Libertas.

=== Parties that did not affiliate to Libertas ===
The parties that considered affiliating with Libertas Poland and the parent organization Libertas.eu, but did not, are as follows:

- Prawica Rzeczypospolitej

Prawica Rzeczypospolitej considered Libertas to have Eurofederalist aspects and rejected Libertas accordingly. No Prawica Rzeczypospolitej candidates appeared on the Libertas list in the 2009 European Parliament elections.

- Law and Justice

Law and Justice (PiS) personnel were mentioned by Pawłowiec as possible Libertas candidates, although no names were given. Libertas tried to get PiS to affiliate to it but it did not do so, and instead ran a full list of its own, although one of its members (Slawomir Ligecki) did defect to Libertas.

== Personnel ==
Person	Position
Declan Ganley	President
Daniel Pawłowiec	Originally President, later vice-president. Former LPR MP
Artur Zawisza	Vice-president and former PR MP

== TVP controversy ==
On 20 March 2009, journalist Hanna Lis refused to do a TVP interview with Declan Ganley. Controversy promptly arose revolving around LPR's Roman Giertych and whether LPR were encouraging coverage of Libertas on TVP via Piotr Farfał the President of TVP and a member of LPR. Hanna Lis, Piotr Kraśko, and Jarosław Kulczycki, the three presenters of a nightly news program, took sick leave in protest, forcing the news to be presented by Marcin Szczepański.

== European Parliament elections, 2009 ==
Libertas Poland started work on/before 20 March 2009 on collecting sufficient signatures to field candidates, although the number and names of those candidates was not specified. By 2 May 2008, a Libertas Election Committee (Komitet Wyborczy Libertas) had been formed and its list consisted of 130 candidates, later falling to 128. The breakdown was as follows:

Party/Movement of which candidates were current/former members	Acronym	Number of candidates on Libertas list	Number of first-placed candidates on Libertas list
Law and Justice	PiS	1	0
Organizacja Narodu Polskiego - Liga Polska	?	1	0
Zjednoczenie Chrześcijańsko-Narodowe	ZChN	1	0
Radio Maryja	n/a	2	2
Libertas Polska	LP	3	2
Forward Poland	NP	6	2
Partia Regionów	PR	6	1
Polskie Stronnictwo Ludowe "Piast"	PSL Piast	13	1
Liga Polskich Rodzin	LPR	40	2
other	n/a	57	3

== See also ==
- Jens-Peter Bonde
- Declan Ganley
- 2009 European Parliament election
- Treaty of Lisbon
