= Party of Bible-abiding Christians =

Party of Bible-abiding Christians Partei Bibeltreuer Christen
- Abbreviation: PBC
- Leader: Gerhard Heinzmann
- Founded: 1989
- Dissolved: 2015
- Merged into: Alliance C – Christians for Germany
- Membership (2013): 2,545
- Ideology: Christian right
- Political position: Right-wing
- Religion: Pentecostalism
- European affiliation: European Christian Political Party
- Colours: White

The Party of Bible-abiding Christians (German: Partei Bibeltreuer Christen, PBC) was a conservative evangelical minor right-wing political party in Germany. It was founded in 1989 during a convent of the Federation of Pentecostal Churches to serve as political arm of the Christian right in Germany. It was against same-sex marriage and legality of abortion. It supported a reference to God in the European Constitution and it strongly supported Israel. In March 2015, the PBC merged with the Party for Labour, Environment and Family (AUF) into the Alliance C – Christians for Germany.

Most members were from Württemberg or Saxony and were members or sympathizers of what Germans call "Freikirche" (Free Church), i.e., Protestants from Pentecostal and Charismatic sects, which are not affiliated with the large Lutheran Protestant Church in Germany.

The party's success, however, was very limited on the federal and state levels of government because it never reached the "5% hurdle" of votes cast necessary to get into the parliaments in Germany's system of proportional representation. In the last federal election the PBC participated (2013), the party achieved 0.0 percent of votes.

By contrast, the conservative Christian Democratic Union and Christian Social Union in Bavaria are powerful political forces in Germany (based on the number of votes and offices held). They differ greatly from the former PBC though in accepting secularization and being traditionally close to the Protestant Church in Germany and the Roman Catholic Church.

The party was a member of the European Christian Political Movement (EPCM).

== Election results ==
=== Federal Parliament (Bundestag) ===
Election	Constituency			Party list			Seats	Status
Election	Votes	%	+/-	Votes	%	+/-	Seats	Status
1994	65,651 (#12)	0.14	New	26,864 (#11)	0.06	New	0 / 631	Extra-parliamentary
1998	71,941 (#15)	0.15	▲0.01	46,379 (#11)	0.09	▲0.03	0 / 631	Extra-parliamentary
2002	101,645 (#12)	0.21	▲0.06	71,106 (#10)	0.15	▲0.06	0 / 631	Extra-parliamentary
2005	108,605 (#12)	0.23	▲0.02	57,027 (#9)	0.12	▼0.03	0 / 631	Extra-parliamentary
2009	40,370 (#17)	0.09	▼0.14	12,052 (#17)	0.03	▼0.09	0 / 631	Extra-parliamentary
2013	18,542 (#21)	0.04	▼0.05	2,081 (#24)	0.00	▼0.03	0 / 631	Extra-parliamentary
