= Libertas Germany =

Libertas Partei Deutschland
- Leader: Carlos A. Gebauer, Eva Schoeller
- Founded: March 3, 2009
- Headquarters: Unter den Linden 21 10117 Berlin
- Ideology: Euroscepticism
- European affiliation: Libertas.eu
- Colours: blue, gold

Website
- libertas-deutschland.de

Libertas Germany (German: Libertas Partei Deutschland) is a eurosceptic German political party founded in 2009. It is a member of the pan-European movement Libertas.eu established to impede the Lisbon Treaty.

The party was part of the wider Libertas network, which sought to promote eurosceptic political positions across several European Union member states.

In March 2009 the foundation of Libertas Germany was disclosed at a press conference in Berlin. Carlos A. Gebauer and Eva Schoeller were presented as candidates for chairperson.

However, Libertas Germany failed to obtain 4.000 certified signatures by the end of March to register for the 2009 Euroelections. This failure was described by the Irish Times as "a major blow to the organisation’s pan-European ambitions".

Instead, the pan-European mother party Libertas.eu found by May 2009 a German affiliate in the small Christian conservative party AUF in order to pursue its pan-European ambitions for the 2009 European Elections. However, as AUF had already filed its electoral lists, the list name did not include the name Libertas, unlike the affiliate lists in the other European countries.
