= Jérôme Rivière =

French politician, lawyer and entrepreneur (born 1964)

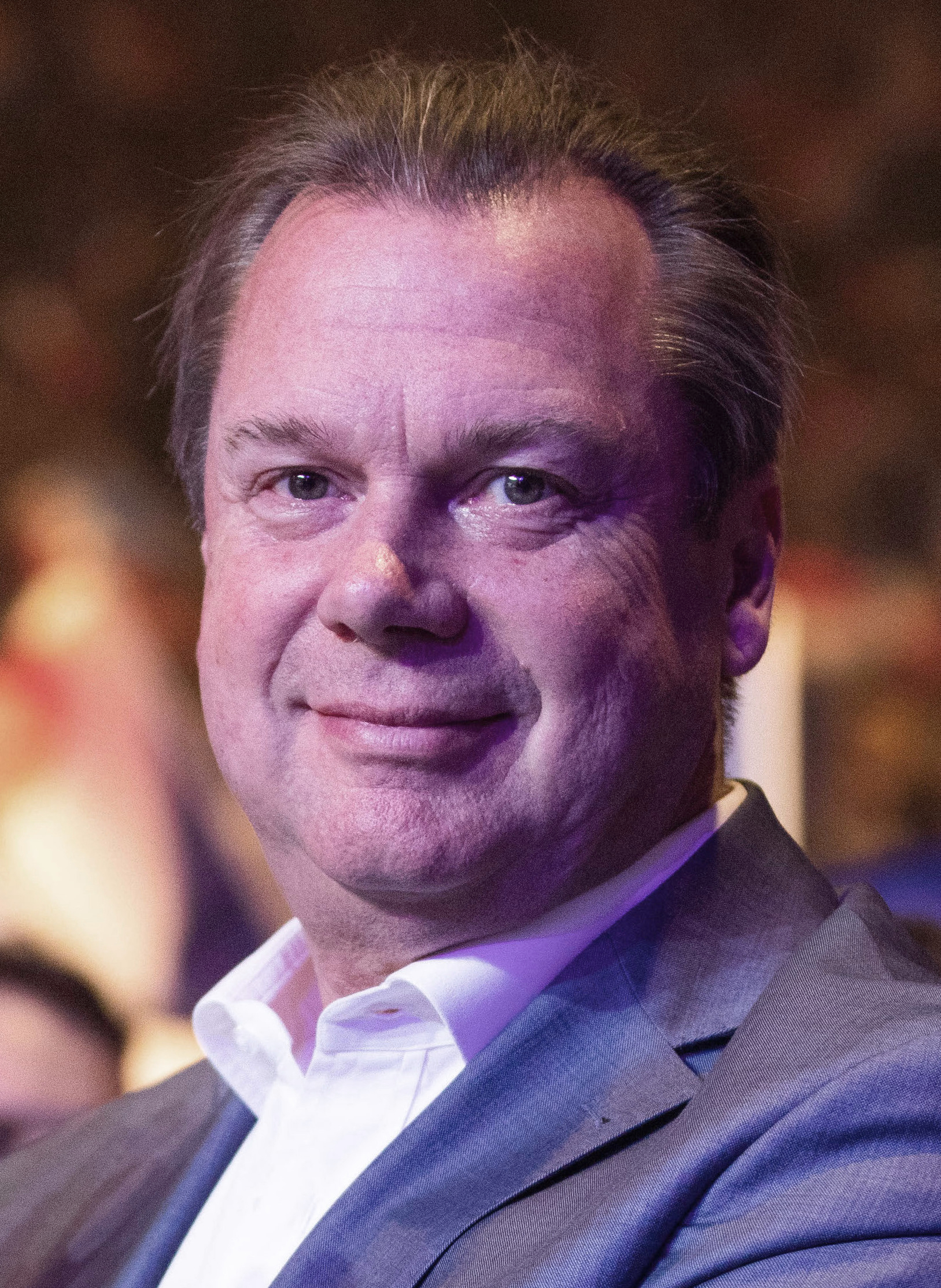
- Rivière in 2022

President of the French delegation to the Identity and Democracy group
- In office 2 July 2019 – 21 January 2022
- Preceded by: Gilles Lebreton
- Succeeded by: Jordan Bardella (acting)

Member of the European Parliament
- In office 2 July 2019 – 15 July 2024
- Constituency: France

Member of the National Assembly for Alpes-Maritimes's 1st constituency
- In office 19 June 2002 – 19 June 2007
- Preceded by: Charles Ehrmann
- Succeeded by: Éric Ciotti

Personal details
- Born: 8 July 1964 (age 62) Paris, France
- Party: Reconquête (2022–2023)
- Other political affiliations: Liberal Democracy and Union for a Popular Movement (until 2007); National Rally (2017–2022)
- Education: ISG Business School

Jérôme Rivière (French pronunciation: [ʒeʁom ʁivjɛʁ]; born 8 July 1964) is a French politician, lawyer and entrepreneur who has served as a Member of the European Parliament (MEP) from 2019 to 2024. A member of the Union for a Popular Movement (UMP) until 2007, he was a member of the National Rally (RN), previously known as the National Front (FN), from 2017 until 2022, when he announced his support for Éric Zemmour in the 2022 presidential election and was appointed vice chairman of Zemmour's newly-founded Reconquête party.

== Biography ==
=== Education ===
Born in Suresnes, Hauts-de-Seine near Paris. Rivière received a master's degree from the ISG business school and an MBA from the European University of America at the University of San Francisco.

=== Career ===
He served as the deputy chief of staff for the Minister of Defense from 1993 to 1995 and was elected to the Regional Council of Provence-Alpes-Côte d'Azur where he served from 1998 to 2004.

Rivière represented the first constituency of Alpes-Maritimes in the French National Assembly from 2002 to 2007 as a member of the Union for a Popular Movement. He was also a member of the subsidiary groups The Free Right and the National Centre of Independents and Peasants. In 2007, he endorsed Philippe de Villiers, the leader of the Movement for France (MPF) in the 2007 presidential election over his party's candidate, the eventual winner, Nicolas Sarkozy. As a result, he was excluded from the UMP and failed to receive the party's nomination for that year's legislative elections. He was defeated running as a right-wing independent in his constituency against the UMP's official candidate and eventual winner Éric Ciotti.

In 2009, the MPF-Libertas selected him to lead the list in the Île-de-France constituency ahead of the 2009 European elections. In November 2016, Rivière became the candidate backed by the National Front in the sixth constituency of Var for the 2017 legislative election, a race which he lost. He is Marine Le Pen's strategic advisor for defense policy and the international spokesperson for the National Rally. In May 2019, he was elected to the European Parliament. Rivière was subsequently elected President of the French delegation to the Identity and Democracy group in the European Parliament. According to news media sources, he would serve as Minister of Defense in a government led by Marine Le Pen.

In January 2022, he decided to join Éric Zemmour's presidential campaign ahead of the 2022 French presidential election. As a result he relinquished the presidency of the French delegation to the Identity and Democracy Group at the European Parliament and was appointed Vice-Chairman of Reconquête, Zemmour's new political party.
