= Citizens (Spanish political party) =

Citizens–Party of the Citizenry Ciudadanos–Partido de la Ciudadanía
- Abbreviation: Cs
- Secretary-General: Carlos Pérez-Nievas
- Spokesperson: Jordi Cañas
- Founded: 7 June 2005 (CC); 9 July 2006 (Cs)
- Youth wing: Group of Young Citizens (J's)
- Membership (2022): ▼7,642
- Ideology: Liberalism (Spanish) Pro-Europeanism
- Political position: Centre to centre-right
- European affiliation: Alliance of Liberals and Democrats for Europe
- European Parliament group: ALDE Group (2014–2019); Renew Europe (2019–2024)
- Colours: Orange; Dark teal
- Congress of Deputies: 0 / 350
- Senate: 0 / 266
- European Parliament: 0 / 61
- Regional Parliaments: 0 / 1,248
- Local Government: 392 / 67,611

Website
- ciudadanos-cs.org

Citizens (Spanish: Ciudadanos; Catalan: Ciutadans [siwtəˈðans]; shortened as Cs—C's until January 2017), officially Citizens–Party of the Citizenry (Ciudadanos–Partido de la Ciudadanía, CS), is a liberal political party in Spain. The party has been located in the centre to centre-right of the political spectrum.

Citizens' political ideology was initially unclear beyond a strong opposition to Catalan independence and Catalan nationalism in general. The party initially presented itself as left-of-centre, holding social democratic and progressive liberal positions; however, it removed any mention of social democracy from its platform in February 2017, moving closer to the political centre. By 2018, it was judged by commentators to have drifted further away from the left, as its focus shifted to competing against the People's Party (PP) as the leading party of the Spanish right. Despite describing itself as postnationalist, (Note: The party used the motto "Catalonia is my homeland, Spain is my country and Europe is our future" in its early days.) it has been deemed by some journalists and academics as professing a Spanish nationalist ideology. Since 2023, the party has been described as less focused on opposing Catalan nationalism, instead emphasising liberal policies.

Founded in Catalonia in 2006, the party initially enjoyed growing support throughout the 2010s on a regional and national level, owing to its staunch opposition to Catalan independence as well as the PP's decline in popularity under then-Prime Minister Mariano Rajoy. Entering the Congress of Deputies in 2015 in fourth place, it became the single largest party in the Parliament of Catalonia in 2017 and entered multiple coalition governments in autonomous communities. Citizens reached its electoral zenith at the April 2019 general election, where it became the third-largest party in the country and pulled ahead of the PP in several regions. This popularity did not last long: after refusing to form a coalition with the Spanish Socialist Workers' Party (PSOE), that year's November snap election saw Citizens lose 47 seats and become the country's smallest national party, resulting in leader Albert Rivera's resignation and departure from politics. This proved to be the first of a succession of electoral defeats that would set Citizens on the path to near-complete political collapse.

In 2021, the party failed to pass a no-confidence vote against its own regional government with the PP in Murcia, after which its coalition partner in the Assembly of Madrid triggered a snap election over fears of meeting the same fate — this resulted in Citizens losing all of its Madrilenian seats, having already lost 30 of its 36 seats in Catalonia earlier that year. The following year, the party lost all but one of its seats in the Cortes of Castile and León, as well as all of its seats in the Parliament of Andalusia. The party chose not to contest the 2023 Spanish general election after facing a near-total collapse in that year's regional and local elections. In 2024, the party lost the last of its electoral representatives in the Catalan and European Parliament elections, receiving less than one percent of the vote in both cases.

== History ==
=== Origins (2005–2006) ===
==== Background ====
Citizens was preceded by the political platform Ciutadans de Catalunya (Citizens of Catalonia), formed on 7 June 2005 by a group of fifteen academics, writers and other figures of Catalan society (including Albert Boadella, Félix de Azúa, and Francesc de Carreras) in reaction to the Generalitat's plans to reform the Statute of Autonomy. The group presented their manifesto at the Centre de Cultura Contemporània de Barcelona on the 21st of the same month, where they called on "citizens of Catalonia who identify with our proposal to demand a political party which will contribute to the restoration of realism", expressing their lacking confidence in the government to "address the real problems faced by the general public." In this manifesto, they declared that "the rhetoric of hatred promulgated by official Catalan government media against everything Spanish is more alarming than ever" and that "the [Catalan] nation, postulated as an homogenous entity, has taken over the space where an undeniably diverse society lives".

Leading up to their formation as a political party, Ciutadans de Catalunya organised several round table meetings and conferences that were occasionally met with controversy; at one event held ahead of the referendum on the 2006 Catalan Statute of Autonomy, several members of the group were assaulted by pro-independence activists. A second manifesto was presented at the Teatro Tívoli in Barcelona on 4 March 2006.

==== Foundation ====
Their founding conference was held in July in Barcelona, where Citizens was formally incorporated as a political party under the full name of Ciudadanos–Partido de la Ciudadanía (Citizens–Party of the Citizenry). Albert Rivera, 26 years old at the time, was elected its first leader.

=== Early years (2006–2013) ===
==== Catalan regional elections ====
Cs presented in 16 September its candidature for the 2006 Catalan regional election, taking part in an election for the first time. The party entered the regional parliament with three MPs, including leader Rivera, winning 89,840 votes, the 3.09% of the total. The party voted against the investiture of José Montilla.

For the 2010 regional election, Albert Rivera was chosen the party's candidate for the presidency of the Catalan Generalitat. The party ended up winning 105,827 votes, the 3.4%, three tenths up from the previous election, maintaining its 3 MPs in the process.

C's took part in the 2012 snap election with Rivera as its candidate again. Its campaign slogan was "Better united". The party received 274,925 votes, the 7.58%, winning 9 MPs and tripling its votes. The party's substantial growth in support was mainly due to its role as a counterweight to the growing public support for independence in Catalonia, with C's acting as one of its most outspoken opponents.

==== Other elections ====
Following the Catalan elections, C's studied expanding to other autonomous communities. The party contested in the 2007 Spanish local elections, winning only 13 councillors, all in Catalonia.

Cs decided to contest in the 2008 Spanish general election, presenting lists all over the country, and expecting to win MPs at least in Madrid and Barcelona. However, the party only won 45,750 votes (0.18%), being unable to achieve parliamentary representation.

Cs participated in the 2009 European Parliament election. The party initially tried to do so in a coalition with the ideologically similar Union, Progress and Democracy (UPYD), but the offer was rejected. The party's decision to take part in the Eurosceptic and nationalist Libertas coalition was met with controversy and led to infighting in the party due to it being at odds with Citizens' professed ideology and alleged irregularities in the process.

The party took part in the 2011 local elections, maintaining 10 of its councillors. C's initially tried to contest in the 2011 general election together with UPYD, but its offer was rejected for the fourth time, leading the party to not contest in order to not divide the vote.

=== Electoral breakthrough (2013–2019) ===
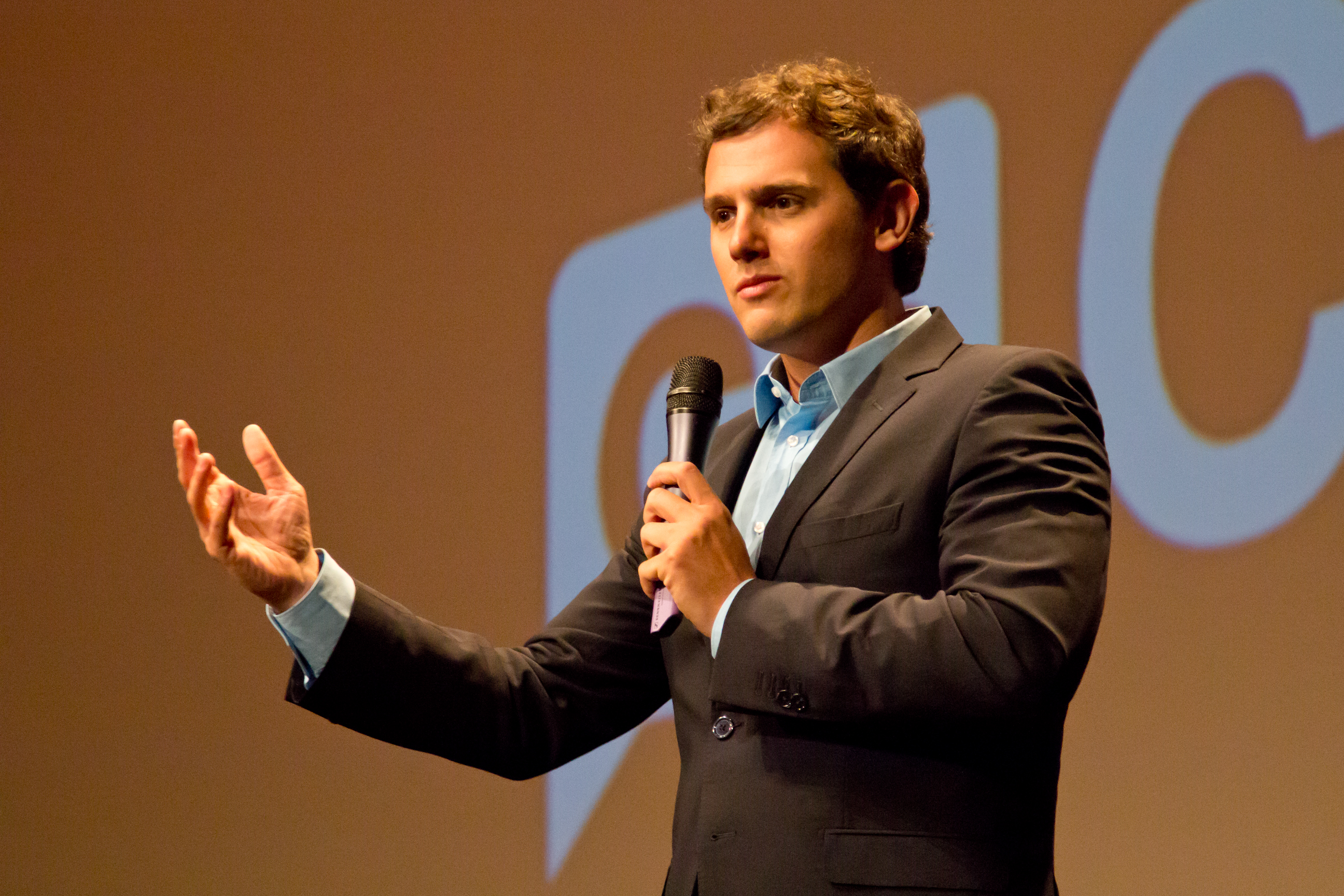
Albert Rivera, former president of the party

==== National expansion ====
In 2013, the party started organising in the rest of Spain with a manifesto called "La conjura de Goya" ("Confederacy of Goya") that took place in the Congress Palace of Madrid.

C's decided to take part in the 2014 European election, where the party received 3.16% of the national vote (497,146 votes) and elected two MEPs. Both MEPs subsequently joined the Alliance of Liberals and Democrats for Europe (ALDE) group. The party was later also accepted into the Alliance of Liberals and Democrats for Europe Party on 4 June 2016.

As part of its national implementation strategy, the party sealed alliances with various minor parties. Parties such as the Liberal Democratic Centre, Union of the Salamancan People, the Regionalist Party of Castile and León, and the Union of the Extremaduran People joined Ciudadanos in 2014. The Sorian People's Platform did the same in 2015.

==== 2015 and 2016 elections ====
Citizens took part in the 2015 Catalan regional election, where it obtained 734,910 votes, the 17.93% of the total vote, more than doubling its results once again. By winning 25 MPs, the party became the second largest faction in the Catalan parliament.

In the 2015 general elections, Cs entered parliament with 3,500,446 votes (the 13.93%) and 40 seats. As PP's Mariano Rajoy refused the mandate to form a government, Citizens promised the Spanish Socialist Workers' Party (PSOE) its support in parliament in exchange for a number of political concessions. However, this pact would have needed the support of Podemos, which Citizens could not abide by; this deadlock ultimately led to the 2016 snap election, where the party lost 0.8% of the popular vote and eight seats. After these elections, Citizens struck a deal with the conservative PP in supporting its government in exchange for a number of political concessions. After a 10-month political deadlock, PP leader Mariano Rajoy was able to win investiture as Prime Minister and retain power.

==== Electoral peak ====
Following the illegal independence referendum in Catalonia and the unilateral declaration of independence in October 2017, C's supported the application of the article 155 of the Spanish constitution. This led to the 2017 snap election in Catalonia, where Cs received 1,109,732 votes (25.26%) and obtained 36 MPs, effectively becoming the most voted party in Catalonia, being the first time in democracy where a non-Catalan nationalist party won a Catalan regional election. Cs candidate Inés Arrimadas did not present for investiture due to lacking enough support to be invested as President of the Catalan Generalitat.

Cs became the third most voted party in the 2018 Andalusian regional election, winning 21 MPs with 18.27% of the votes. The party became the junior partner of a coalition government with the PP, which received the external support of Vox.

Cs achieved its best result in a general election in the April 2019 Spanish general election, winning 4,136,600 votes (the 15.86%) and 57 seats, becoming the third most voted party in the country.

In the 2019 European elections, the party obtained 12% of the vote and won a total of seven MEPs (which became eight post-Brexit).

=== Electoral decline (2019–present) ===
==== Rivera's resignation ====
C's went through electoral collapse in the November 2019 general election, having lost 80% of its seats (going from 57 to 10) and maintaining only 1,6 million votes (the 6.79%, down from the 15,9% of the previous election). This led to the resignation of Albert Rivera as party president, who was succeeded by Inés Arrimadas.

==== Arrimadas' leadership ====
In March 2021, Citizens, together with the Spanish Socialist Workers' Party, presented a surprise no-confidence motion in the Region of Murcia against their own regional coalition government with the People's Party. The motion failed due to defection of several Ciudadanos deputies, and triggered a "political earthquake" across the country, leading to a number of high-ranking members abandoning the party. In the aftermath, Cs also lost all its 26 deputies in Madrid in the 2021 Madrilenian regional election, and fell in country-wide polls from ≈7% support (≈10 deputies) down to ≈3% (≈1 deputy).

==== Vázquez's leadership ====
In September 2023, Francisco Igea and Edmundo Bal were expelled from Citizens for criticising the party's decision not to contest the 2023 Spanish general election. Igea did not appeal the decision and did not resign his seat. This left Cs without any seats in Spanish regional parliaments, outside of Catalonia. The party would lose all of its seats in the Parliament of Catalonia in the 2024 election, and all of its seats in the 2024 European Parliament election a month later. After the European Parliament election, the party was left with no members of the Congress of Deputies, Senate, European Parliament, or any regional parliament, but still retained 392 at the municipal level.

== Ideology ==
Citizens initially branded itself as a centre-left party holding social democratic and progressive liberal positions; the party was commonly described as social liberal in its early years and appealed to disillusioned members of the PSC who were strongly opposed to Catalan nationalism. However, the party removed any mention of social democracy from its platform by 2017, having joined the liberal ALDE Group the previous year, and the party repositioned itself as a centrist, progressive liberal party. By 2018, the party was judged to have shifted towards centre-right liberalism in order to compete with the PP. Since 2020, the party has been described as shifting back to the centre, emphasizing liberal policies over its opposition to Catalan nationalism.

Cs is mainly regarded as a liberal party, known for its strong opposition to Catalan nationalism and its support of European federalism. The party has also been variously described as progressive-liberal, conservative-liberal, populist, and pro-European. Federico Finchelstein identifies Citizens with a light brand of "neo-liberal populism". Regarding its position on the political spectrum, the party places itself in the political centre and has been regarded as both centrist and centre-right. The party was previously also described as centre-left, in line with its ideario.

=== Domestic policy ===
Cs displays a political discourse mainly centered around opposition to Catalan nationalism and the Catalan independence movement, to the extent that it has been frequently criticised as a single-issue party. As an originally Catalan party, it specifically opposes Catalan nationalism due to viewing it as an outdated, authoritarian and socially divisive ideology which fuels hatred among both Catalans and Spaniards. Former party leader Rivera used the phrase "Catalonia is my homeland, Spain is my country and Europe is our future" to describe the party's ideology.

Cs defines itself as a postnationalist party and criticises any sort of nationalism, "including the Spanish nationalism that Mr. Ynestrillas defends". However, it has been deemed by a variety of sources to profess a Spanish nationalist ideology. In a party conference held on 20 May 2018 to present its platform España Ciudadana, Rivera said in a hall filled with Spanish flags:

I do not see reds and blues, I see Spaniards. I do not see, as they say, urban people and rural people, I see Spaniards. I do not see young or old, I see Spaniards. I do not see workers and entrepreneurs, I see Spaniards. I do not see believers or agnostics, I see Spaniards. [...] So, compatriots, with Citizens, let's go for that Spain, let's feel proud of being Spaniards again.

One of the main issues raised by the party is the Catalan language policy which actively promotes the use of the Catalan language as the sole working language in Catalan public administration. The party challenges this policy and defends equal treatment of the Spanish and Catalan languages. It also opposes the current language policy within the Catalan educational system in accordance with which all public schooling is delivered in Catalan.

Although reconsidering the current head of state is not a priority for the party, Rivera has said that Citizens is "a republican party which claims that Spanish citizens are who have to decide whether they prefer a once-modernized monarchy or a republic through a referendum in the context of a constitutional reform".

Cs supports a renewed State of Autonomies without concessions to separatism. The party wants to reform the electoral system with the aim of creating greater proportionality that would give less weight to single constituencies. Regarding the chartered autonomous communities' tax regimes, the party does not want to remove the Basque Country's and Navarre's chartered regimes because they're protected by the Constitution. However, it criticises what it calls the miscalculation of the quota or contribution which is negotiated between governments and has been causing significant differences that they regard as having become outrageous. It proposes a review and a recalculation of the Navarrese and Basque Economic Agreements in order to stop the Basque Country and Navarre being "net beneficiaries".

=== Social policy ===
Cs supports the legalization of euthanasia. It is the only party in Spain to openly advocate the legalization of altruistic gestational surrogacy. Among other policies, they also support the regularisation of prostitution, the legalisation of cannabis and LGBT rights, including homosexual adoption. The party supports liberal feminism.

=== Economic policy ===
Cs supports lower taxation and wants to harmonize the inheritance tax in the entire country.

=== Foreign policy ===
Cs supports the creation of a European army. The party is currently a supporter of European federalism.

== Organization ==
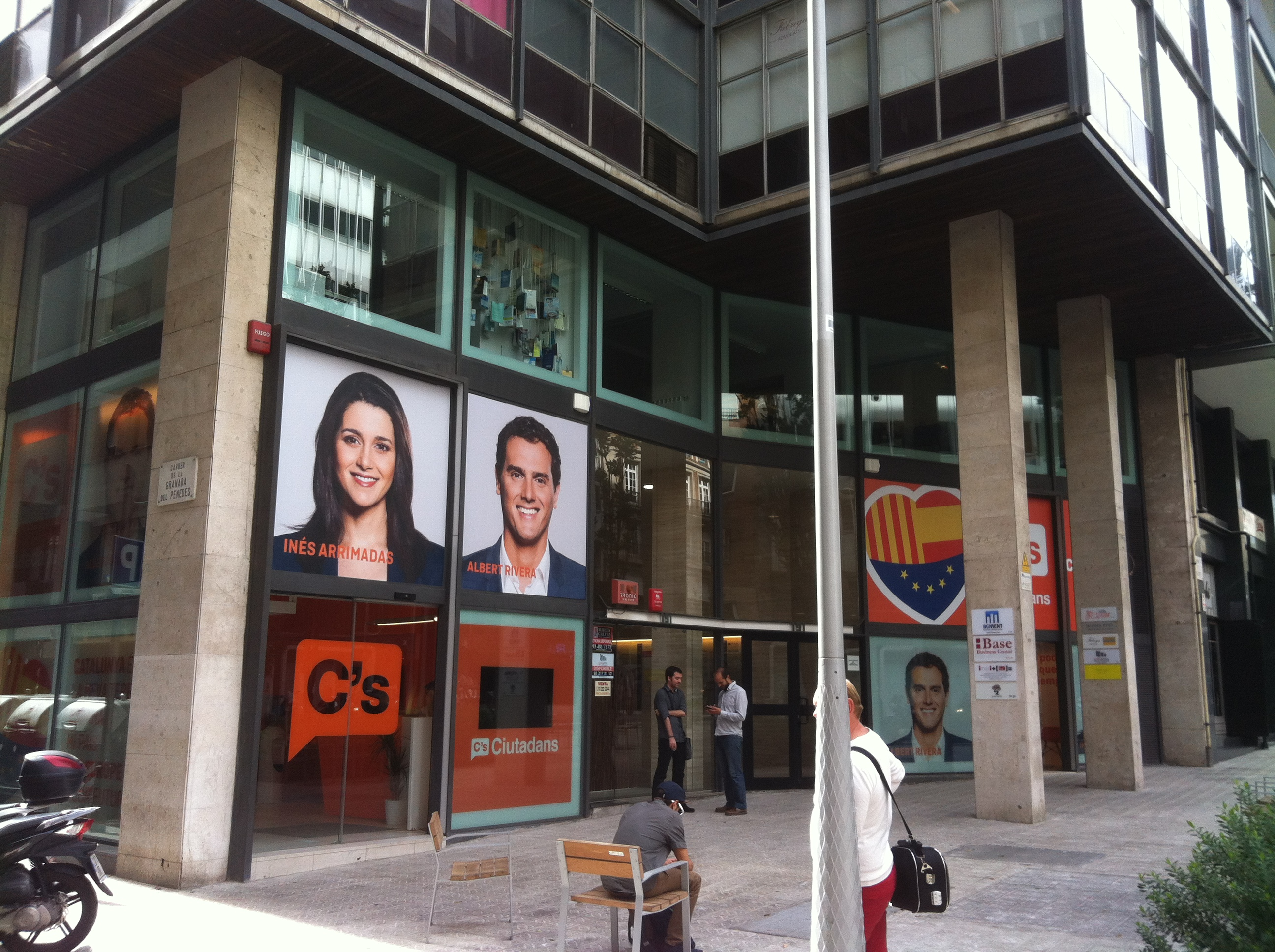
Former Barcelona Citizens Headquarters (2015-2021) in Sant Gervasi – Galvany. From 2015 to 2017 it also served as its Central HQ before its relocation to Madrid.

=== Leadership ===
==== Presidents ====
President		Time in office
1.	Albert Rivera	2006 – 2019
–	Manuel García Bofill	2019 – 2020
2.	Inés Arrimadas	2020 – 2023
3.	Carlos Carrizosa	2023 – 2024

==== Secretaries-general ====
Secretary-General		Time in office
1.	Antonio Robles	2006 – 2007
2.	Manuel García Bofill	2007 – 2009
3.	Matías Alonso	2009 – 2017
4.	José Manuel Villegas	2017 – 2020
5.	Marina Bravo	2020 – 2023
6.	Adrián Vázquez Lázara	2023 – 2024
7.	Carlos Pérez-Nievas	2024 – present

==== National coordinators ====
The party's national coordinators were known as its Organizational secretaries until 2023.

National coordinator		Time in office
1.	Albert Roig	2007 – 2011
2.	José Manuel Villegas	2011 – 2014
3.	Fran Hervías	2014 – 2020
4.	Borja González	2020 – 2022
5.	Carlos Pérez-Nievas	2022 – present

=== International affiliation ===
In the Ninth European Parliament, Ciudadanos sat in the Renew Europe group with six MEPs, sharing group with Emmanuel Macron's La République En Marche! (LREM), the German Free Democratic Party (FDP) and the Dutch Democrats 66 (D66). The party had been a member of its predecessor, the ALDE group, in the previous legislature. C's has been a member of the ALDE party since 4 June 2016. On 27 October 2018, Citizens' pressure led to the expulsion of Carles Puigdemont's Catalan European Democratic Party from ALDE due to its history of corruption.

== Electoral performance ==
=== Cortes Generales ===
Cortes Generales
Election	Leading candidate	Congress			Senate			Gov.
Election	Leading candidate	Votes	%	Seats	Votes	%	Seats	Gov.
2008	Albert Rivera	46,313	0.2 (#14)	0 / 350	200,242	0.3 (#11)	0 / 208	—
2015	Albert Rivera	3,514,528	13.9 (#4)	40 / 350	7,417,388	11.2 (#4)	0 / 208	—
2016	Albert Rivera	3,141,570	13.1 (#4)	32 / 350	6,894,853	10.6 (#4)	0 / 208	No
Apr. 2019	Albert Rivera	4,155,665	15.9 (#3)	57 / 350	10,665,627	14.9 (#3)	4 / 208	—
Nov. 2019	Albert Rivera	1,650,318	6.8 (#5)	10 / 350	4,951,350	7.8 (#4)	0 / 208	No

=== European Parliament ===
European Parliament
Election	Leading candidate	Votes	%	Seats	EP Group
2009	Miguel Durán	Within Libertas		0 / 54	—
2014	Javier Nart	497,146	3.2 (#8)	2 / 54	ALDE
2019	Luis Garicano	2,731,825	12.2 (#3)	8 / 59	RE
2024	Jordi Cañas	122,292	0.7 (#11)	0 / 61	—

=== Local councils ===
Local councils
Election	Votes	%	Councillors	+/–
2007	71,226	0.32 (#16)	13 / 66,131	13
2011	42,143	0.19 (#22)	10 / 68,230	3
2015	1,469,875	6.55 (#5)	1,516 / 67,515	1506
2019	2,089,018	9.17 (#3)	2,793 / 66,976	1277
2023	323,934	1.45 (#10)	591 / 66,976	2202

=== Results timeline ===
Year	(Spain) ES	(European Union) EU	(Andalusia) AN	(Aragon) AR	(Asturias) AS	(Canary Islands) CN	(Cantabria) CB	(Castilla–La Mancha) CM	(Castile and León) CL	(Catalonia) CT	(Ceuta) CE	(Extremadura) EX	(Galicia (Spain)) GL	(Balearic Islands) IB	RI	(Community of Madrid) MD	(Melilla) ML	(Region of Murcia) MC	(Navarre) NC	(Basque Country (autonomous community)) PV	(Valencian Community) CV
2006	N/A	N/A	N/A	N/A	N/A	N/A	N/A	N/A	N/A	3.1	N/A	N/A	N/A	N/A	N/A	N/A	N/A	N/A	N/A	N/A	N/A
2007	N/A	N/A	N/A	N/A	N/A	N/A	N/A	N/A	N/A	3.1	N/A	N/A	N/A	N/A	N/A	N/A	N/A	N/A	N/A	N/A	N/A
2008	0.2	N/A	0.1	N/A	N/A	N/A	N/A	N/A	N/A	3.1	N/A	N/A	N/A	N/A	N/A	N/A	N/A	N/A	N/A	N/A	N/A
2009	0.2	(Note: Within Libertas–Citizens of Spain.)	0.1	N/A	N/A	N/A	N/A	N/A	N/A	3.1	N/A	N/A	N/A	N/A	N/A	N/A	N/A	N/A	N/A	N/A	N/A
2010	0.2	(Note: Within Libertas–Citizens of Spain.)	0.1	N/A	N/A	N/A	N/A	N/A	N/A	▲3.4	N/A	N/A	N/A	N/A	N/A	N/A	N/A	N/A	N/A	N/A	N/A
2011	N/A	(Note: Within Libertas–Citizens of Spain.)	0.1	N/A	N/A	N/A	N/A	N/A	N/A	▲3.4	N/A	N/A	N/A	0.2	N/A	0.2	N/A	N/A	N/A	N/A	N/A
2012	N/A	(Note: Within Libertas–Citizens of Spain.)	N/A	N/A	N/A	N/A	N/A	N/A	N/A	▲7.6	N/A	N/A	N/A	0.2	N/A	0.2	N/A	N/A	N/A	N/A	N/A
2013	N/A	(Note: Within Libertas–Citizens of Spain.)	N/A	N/A	N/A	N/A	N/A	N/A	N/A	▲7.6	N/A	N/A	N/A	0.2	N/A	0.2	N/A	N/A	N/A	N/A	N/A
2014	N/A	▲3.2	N/A	N/A	N/A	N/A	N/A	N/A	N/A	▲7.6	N/A	N/A	N/A	0.2	N/A	0.2	N/A	N/A	N/A	N/A	N/A
2015	13.9	▲3.2	9.2	9.4	7.1	5.9	6.9	8.6	10.3	▲17.9	**6.0**	4.4	N/A	▲5.9	10.4	▲12.2	**6.8**	**12.6**	**3.0**	N/A	12.5
2016	▼13.1	▲3.2	9.2	9.4	7.1	5.9	6.9	8.6	10.3	▲17.9	**6.0**	4.4	**3.4**	▲5.9	10.4	▲12.2	**6.8**	**12.6**	**3.0**	**2.0**	12.5
2017	▼13.1	▲3.2	9.2	9.4	7.1	5.9	6.9	8.6	10.3	▲**25.4**	**6.0**	4.4	**3.4**	▲5.9	10.4	▲12.2	**6.8**	**12.6**	**3.0**	**2.0**	12.5
2018	▼13.1	▲3.2	▲**18.3**	9.4	7.1	5.9	6.9	8.6	10.3	▲**25.4**	**6.0**	4.4	**3.4**	▲5.9	10.4	▲12.2	**6.8**	**12.6**	**3.0**	**2.0**	12.5
2019	▲**15.9**	▲**12.2**		▲**16.7**	▲**14.0**	▲**7.4**	▲**7.9**	▲**11.4**	▲**14.9**	▲**25.4**	▼4.5	▲**11.1**	**3.4**	▲**9.9**	▲**11.5**	▲**19.5**	▼5.6	▼12.0	(Note: Within Navarra Suma.)	**2.0**	▲**17.7**
2019	▼6.8	▲**12.2**		▲**16.7**	▲**14.0**	▲**7.4**	▲**7.9**	▲**11.4**		▲**25.4**	▼4.5	▲**11.1**	**3.4**	▲**9.9**	▲**11.5**				(Note: Within Navarra Suma.)	**2.0**	▲**17.7**
2020	▼6.8	▲**12.2**		▲**16.7**	▲**14.0**	▲**7.4**	▲**7.9**	▲**11.4**		▲**25.4**	▼4.5	▲**11.1**	▼0.8	▲**9.9**	▲**11.5**				(Note: Within Navarra Suma.)	(Note: Within PP+Cs.)	▲**17.7**
2021	▼6.8	▲**12.2**		▲**16.7**	▲**14.0**	▲**7.4**	▲**7.9**	▲**11.4**		▼5.6	▼4.5	▲**11.1**	▼0.8	▲**9.9**	▲**11.5**	▼3.6			(Note: Within Navarra Suma.)	(Note: Within PP+Cs.)	▲**17.7**
2022	▼6.8	▲**12.2**	▼3.3	▲**16.7**	▲**14.0**	▲**7.4**	▲**7.9**	▲**11.4**	▼4.5	▼5.6	▼4.5	▲**11.1**	▼0.8	▲**9.9**	▲**11.5**	▼3.6			(Note: Within Navarra Suma.)	(Note: Within PP+Cs.)	▲**17.7**
2023	N/A	▲**12.2**	▼3.3	▼1.3	▼0.9	▼0.4	▼2.3	▼1.0	▼4.5	▼5.6	▼0.7	▼0.9	▼0.8	▼1.4	▼0.9	▼1.6	N/A	▼1.5	▼0.4	(Note: Within PP+Cs.)	▼1.5
2024	N/A	▼0.7	▼3.3	▼1.3	▼0.9	▼0.4	▼2.3	▼1.0	▼4.5	▼0.7	▼0.7	▼0.9	N/A	▼1.4	▼0.9	▼1.6	N/A	▼1.5	▼0.4	N/A	▼1.5
2025	N/A	▼0.7	▼3.3	▼1.3	▼0.9	▼0.4	▼2.3	▼1.0	▼4.5	▼0.7	▼0.7	▼0.3	N/A	▼1.4	▼0.9	▼1.6	N/A	▼1.5	▼0.4	N/A	▼1.5
2026	N/A	▼0.7	N/A	N/A	▼0.9	▼0.4	▼2.3	▼1.0	▼0.4	▼0.7	▼0.7	▼0.3	N/A	▼1.4	▼0.9	▼1.6	N/A	▼1.5	▼0.4	N/A	▼1.5
Year	(Spain) ES	(European Union) EU	(Andalusia) AN	(Aragon) AR	(Asturias) AS	(Canary Islands) CN	(Cantabria) CB	(Castilla–La Mancha) CM	(Castile and León) CL	(Catalonia) CT	(Ceuta) CE	(Extremadura) EX	(Galicia (Spain)) GL	(Balearic Islands) IB	RI	(Community of Madrid) MD	(Melilla) ML	(Region of Murcia) MC	(Navarre) NC	(Basque Country (autonomous community)) PV	(Valencian Community) CV
**Bold** indicates best result to date. To be decided Present in legislature (in opposition); Junior coalition partner Senior coalition partner

== Public profile and controversies ==
=== Alternative and past memberships ===
In 2006, the newspaper El Periódico de Catalunya revealed that Rivera was a card-carrying member of the conservative People's Party (PP) between 2002 and 2006 and that he had left the PP only three months before running for election in Citizens. This was corroborated by El Mundo and El País. Despite these revelations, Rivera denied having been a full member of PP and implied that he had voted for the PSOE until recently. Past PP membership is common among Cs members. Former PSC activist Juan Carlos Girauta had joined the PP and became a prolific contributor to conservative journalism from his Libertad Digital column before becoming a Citizens member and candidate in the 2014 European election. During his long tenure as Libertad Digital columnist and COPE debater, Girauta expressed strong sympathies for right-wing Zionism (to the point of calling then-President Zapatero an antisemite) and lent credibility to the now discredited book by Victor Farías dismissing socialist politician Salvador Allende as a racist and a social Darwinist, without clarifying that the quotations about genetic determinism in Allende's doctoral dissertation were themselves quotations from other authors (mostly Cesare Lombroso) or the fact that Allende was highly critical of these conclusions in his thesis which was later published as a rebuttal to Farías' position. Farías was later sued for this, but Girauta never retracted his statements.

In 2015, a member of the Citizens electoral list for Gijón to the city council and regional elections posted pro-Falangist, pro-Blue Division and pro-Hitler Youth messages on Facebook. Those same elections carried news of at least five other former card-carrying Falange and/or España 2000 members.

=== Altercations ===
Prominent meetings of the party have been reportedly picketed by Catalan separatist groups on several occasions. Its leader Albert Rivera has received anonymous death threats urging him to quit politics. Two members of the ERC Youth were sentenced to prison for it. Members of Ciudadanos have repeatedly taken part in violent attacks on Catalan targets and far-right and ultranationalist groups are usually present in their demonstrations. In one instance, a Telemadrid cameraman was assaulted, allegedly because he was mistaken for a member of Catalan broadcaster TV3.

An altercation took place in Canet de Mar on 21 May 2018 between pro-independence local residents, who had planted yellow crosses on the beach to honor imprisoned and fugitive politicians; and anti-independence individuals who decided to remove said crosses. The altercation left at least three people wounded, including an 82-year-old man and a local CUP councilor who explicitly accused Citizens and Falange militants from across the whole region to be among the provocateurs. Citizens Member of Parliament Carlos Carrizosa dismissed the claim that either "councillors or party activists" from the party were involved in the incidents. Four days later and despite admonishments and warnings by President of the Parliament Roger Torrent, Carrizosa himself removed a yellow ribbon from the seats reserved for absent Cabinet ministers, forcing the President to suspend the entire session.

=== Relations with the media ===
During the 2006 Catalan election campaign, the party's president Albert Rivera appeared completely naked in a poster in order to attract publicity to the party. In the beginning, the party frequently complained about an alleged boycott on the part of Catalan media. In their opinion, the party was given too little airtime to present its views on the Catalan public television.

=== 2009 European election internal dispute ===
In 2009, it was announced that Cs would run for the European election allied with the Libertas coalition. The party's association with Declan Ganley's Libertas platform raised some concern on account of the coalition formed by the latter with nationalist and ultranationalist parties in each of its local European chapters, seemingly at odds with the professed ideology of Cs.

Several intellectuals that had participated in the formation of Ciutadans later withdrew their support. For example, Albert Boadella became one of the co-founders of the Union, Progress and Democracy (UPyD) party led by former Basque Socialist politician Rosa Díez.

According to some members of Cs, the negotiations prior to this electoral pact were led personally and secretly by the party leader Albert Rivera. This alienated the other two MPs (besides Rivera himself) and a significant part of the party from his leadership. In turn, the official stance of Cs is that the critics are using the dispute as a pretext to canvass support for the ideologically similar UPyD.

=== Relations with the far-right ===
The party's economic spokesman, Toni Roldán, announced that he was leaving Citizens on June 24, 2019, in protest at the party's drift to the right and its alleged willingness to enter alliances with the far-right after regional and municipal elections. Following Roldán's resignation, MEP Javier Nart and the Asturian leader Juan Vázquez stepped down as well, leaving their political offices in the party's committee and the Asturian Parliament, respectively.

Some days later, Francesc de Carreras, one of the party founders, and Francisco de la Torre, MP and economist, also announced that they would leave the party due to its stances against the PSOE and supposed inclination to alliances with the far-right.

This crisis came after French President Emmanuel Macron's government sent a warning to Citizens, with which his En Marche! party shared membership in the Renew Europe group in the European Parliament, over its alleged willingness to work with the far-right Vox.

=== Funding ===
A credit was requested for party funding in 2015 to Banco Popular Español, up to 2017 an IBEX 35 member.

In 2017, the Court of Audit found irregularities in the accounting books of several political groups, Citizens among them. In respect of Citizens, the irregularities included illegal expenses for advertising on local television in 2015.

Cs member Jorge Soler appeared in December 2017 on the TV3 debate Preguntes Freqüents, during which journalist Beatriz Talegón addressed him about the 2.1 million euros spent by Cs in the 21-D Catalan election campaign—higher than the budget spent by any other party on that election. Talegón inquired about the sources of this funding. Soler replied that this ample budget could be ascribed to the austerity of their party.

== Bibliography ==
- Auzias, Dominique; Labourdette, Jean-Paul (2014), Barcelone 2014 Petit Futé (avec cartes, photos + avis des lecteurs) (in French), Petit Futé, 340, ISBN 978-2-7469-7924-6
- López Basaguren, Alberto; Escajedo San Epifanio, Leire (2013), The Ways of Federalism in Western Countries and the Horizons of Territorial Autonomy in Spain: Volume 2, Springer Science & Business Media, 924, ISBN 978-3-642-27717-7
- Medda-Windischer, Roberta; Carlà, Andrea (2015), Migration and Autonomous Territories: The Case of South Tyrol and Catalonia, Hotei Publishing, 308, ISBN 978-90-04-28279-7
- Rodríguez Teruel, Juan; Barrio, Astrid (December 2015). "Going national: Ciudadanos from Catalonia to Spain". South European Society and Politics. 21 (4). Taylor and Francis: 587–607. doi:10.1080/13608746.2015.1119646. S2CID 155402347. Published online.
- Flesher Fominaya, Cristina; Garvía Soto, Roberto (2008). Nuevas tecnologías de la comunicación, democracia y participación política (PDF). Colección Mediterráneo Económico: Modernidad, crisis y globalización: problemas de política y cultura (in Spanish). Vol. 14. Publicaciones Cajamar. ISBN 978-84-95531-41-4. Archived from the original (PDF) on 24 September 2015.
- Ancelovici, Marcos; Dufour, Pascale; Nez, Héloïse (2016), Street politics in the age of austerity: from the indignados to occupy, Amsterdam University Press, ISBN 978-90-485-2546-1
- Ferrán, Ofelia; Hilbink, Lisa (2016), Legacies of Violence in Contemporary Spain: Exhuming the Past, Understanding the Present, Routledge, 384, ISBN 978-1-317-53295-8
- Butler, Stuart (2016), The Basque Country and Navarre: France. Spain, Bradt Travel Guides, 288, ISBN 978-1-84162-482-2
- Cohen, Boyd; Muñoz, Pablo (2016), The Emergence of the Urban Entrepreneur: How the Growth of Cities and the Sharing Economy Are Driving a New Breed of Innovators, ABC-CLIO, 175, ISBN 978-1-4408-4456-0
- Príncipe, Catarina; Sunkara, Bhaskar (2016), Europe in Revolt: Mapping the New European Left, Haymarket Books, 280, ISBN 978-1-60846-658-0
