= Libertas Netherlands =

Libertas Nederland
- Leader: Alexander Brom
- Founded: on/before 18 March 2009
- Headquarters: Socratesstraat 289, 3076 BW Rotterdam.
- Ideology: anti-Lisbon Treaty, Pan-European nationalism
- European affiliation: Libertas Party Limited
- Colours: blue, gold

Website
- www.libertasnederland.nl/

Libertas Netherlands (Dutch: Libertas Nederland) was a political party in the Netherlands. It contended the 2009 European Parliament elections under a common banner with Libertas Party Limited, the organization founded by Declan Ganley.

== History ==
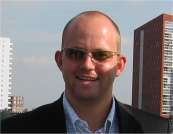
Alexander Brom

Ganleys registration with the Dutch Electoral Council (Kiesraad) to allow Libertas Nederland to run in the 2009 elections in the Netherlands was successful.

On 18 March 2009, Nederland Transparant proclaimed their support for Libertas. Nederland Transparent did not field their own candidates for the European Parliament election, 2009 because of a dispute with the Dutch government over whether they were the successor to, or the same party as Europa Transparent after their merger on 1 January 2008. However, during a press conference on 18 March 2009 Ganley announced Alexander Brom, one of Nederland Transparant's members and former candidates, as the president of Libertas Nederland.

=== 2009 European Parliament elections ===
Libertas Nederlands presented an electoral list with 24 candidates (see List of Libertas list candidates at the 2009 European Parliament elections) but could not gain any mandate.

== See also ==
- 2009 European Parliament election
- Treaty of Lisbon
