= Libertas (Czech Republic) =

Libertas.cz
- Leader: Vladimír Železný
- Founded: January 21, 2009
- Headquarters: Dlouhá 12, 110 00 Prague 1
- Ideology: Anti-Lisbon Treaty; Euroscepticism
- European affiliation: Libertas.eu
- Colours: blue, gold

Website
- voltelibertas.cz

Libertas.cz is a eurosceptic party in the Czech Republic that was founded in 2009 by the former media entrepreneur and MEP Vladimír Železný. After some controversies it became an associate of Declan Ganley's pan-European alliance Libertas.eu.

== History ==
After comprehensive negotiations with president Václav Klaus and other leading Czech eurosceptics, Ganley's attempts to bring about a Czech branch of Libertas.eu remained unsuccessful. The newly founded Party of Free Citizens, which was endorsed by Klaus, unexpectedly refused to cooperate with Ganley's pan-European alliance, leaving the name Libertas unclaimed in the Czech Republic.

This enabled the former media mogul Vladimír Železný, a eurosceptic Member of the European Parliament to register a party under exactly the designated name by January 21, 2009. It remained unclear whether the registration had been accomplished in some way on behalf of the European Libertas.eu or without any consent.

Supporters of Železný's Libertas.cz included Jana Bobošíková and Vlastimil Tlustý but not Declan Ganley and his followers, who promptly disavowed the party. However, after Václav Klaus intervened, two MPs, Vlastimil Tlustý and Jan Schwippel, changed sides, leaving ODS and joining Železný's Libertas.cz. This led the European Libertas.eu to a volte-face, now claiming Železný's Libertas.cz an affiliate.

== 2009 European Parliament elections ==
The list fielded by Libertas.cz in the 2009 European Parliament elections contained the following 29 candidates:

Code	Party	Number of candidates	%	Source
172	Nezávislí demokraté	19	65.52	
99	no party affiliation	6	20.69	
53	Civic Democratic Party	1	3.45	
713	Libertas.cz	2	6.90	
701	Doktoři (za uzdravení společnosti)	1	3.45	

The list contained the nineteen candidates from Železný's other party (Nezávislí demokraté), six independents (including Jan Schwippel, now disavowed ODS), one ODS (Vlastimil Tlustý), and three other candidates.

The number of candidates elected was zero.

== See also ==
- Treaty of Lisbon
