= Libertas Malta =

- Leader: Mary Gauci
- Founded: 21 March 2009
- Headquarters: Realco Buildings, Triq Imħallef Paolo Debono, Msida (University Roundabout), Malta
- Ideology: Anti-Lisbon Treaty; Euroscepticism
- European affiliation: Libertas.eu
- Colours: blue, gold

Website
- www.libertas.eu/malta

Libertas Malta was a political party in Malta set up to contest the 2009 European Parliament elections under a common banner with Libertas.eu. Its only candidate Mary Gauci failed to be elected and the party has been inactive since.

== History ==
Plans of Libertas.eu's leader Declan Ganley to cooperate with the Maltese Azzjoni Nazzjonali (AN) on contesting the 2009 European Parliament elections didn't realize. However, Mary Gauci, AN's former vice-president decided to run under the banner of Libertas.

On 21 March 2009, Ganley announced the establishment of the party Libertas Malta. Mary Gauci, announced as party leader, advanced the issues of democracy, accountability, transparency, subsidiarity, a concise constitution passed by referendums, and illegal immigration.

In the European Parliament election held that year Gauci got only 298 first-preference votes out of 248,169 valid votes cast (i.e. 0.1%).

== Election results ==
=== European Parliament ===
| Election | Leader | Votes | % | Seats | +/− | Rank | EP Group |
|---|---|---|---|---|---|---|---|
| 2009 | Mary Gauci | 298 | 0.12 | 0 / 6 | New | 4th | – |

== See also ==
- Treaty of Lisbon
- List of Libertas list candidates at the 2009 European Parliament elections
