= Bolesław Borysiuk =

Polish politician

member of Sejm 2005-2007
- Incumbent
- Assumed office 25 September 2005

Personal details
- Born: 1 May 1948 (age 77)
- Party: Samoobrona

Bolesław Borys Borysiuk (born 1 May 1948 in Jałowiec) is a Polish politician. He was elected to the Sejm on 25 September 2005, getting 8,256 votes in 6 Lublin district as a candidate from Samoobrona Rzeczpospolitej Polskiej list.

== See also ==
- Members of Polish Sejm 2005-2007
