= Union of the Salamancan People =

Union of the Salamancan People Unión del Pueblo Salmantino
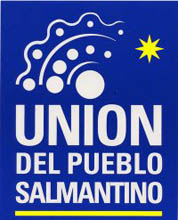
- President: Luis Fuentes
- Secretary-General: Manuel Hernández
- Founded: 2002
- Dissolved: 2014
- Merged into: Ciudadanos
- Headquarters: Salamanca, Spain
- Ideology: Regionalism; Liberalism
- Political position: Center

Website
- web.archive.org/web/20090304153544/http://www.uniondelpueblosalmantino.es/

The Union of the Salamancan People (Spanish: Unión del Pueblo Salmantino, UPSa), officially Union of the Salamancan People – Citizens for Salamanca, was a Spanish political party established in 2002 and dissolved in 2014 based in Salamanca which is aligned with Libertas. It was founded by José María Moreno Balmisa, a former DSC and People's Party member. In 2006 the organization signed a pact of cooperation with the Leonese People's Union. In July 2014, UPS joined Ciudadanos.

== Election results ==
Election results of the UPS
| Election | Votes | % | Town councillors |
|---|---|---|---|
| Local elections, 2003 | 7,410 | 3.44% | 58 |
| Local elections, 2007 | 10,179 | 4.85% | 85 |
| Local elections, 2011 | 6,836 | 3.41% | 69 |
