= Libertas Estonia =

Estonian political party

Libertas Estonia Libertas Eesti Erakond
- Leader: Jaan Laas
- Founded: 29 November 1994
- Headquarters: Telliskivi 22-1, Tallinn, 10611
- Ideology: Anti-Lisbon Treaty; Euroscepticism
- European affiliation: Libertas
- Colours: Blue, Gold

Libertas Estonia (Estonian: Libertas Eesti Erakond, LEE) was a political party in Estonia. It intended to contend the 2009 European Parliament elections under a common banner with Libertas.eu.

== Estonian Blue Party (1994–2001) ==
The Estonian Blue Party (Eesti Sinine Erakond, ESE) was founded on 29 November 1994 in Tallinn, Estonia. It was registered at the Harju registry on 28 October 1998, registration number 80053499. It attempted to join the Development Party (Arengupartei) in October 2000 but the attempt failed.

== Democrats – Estonian Democratic Party (2001–2009) ==
On 1 February 2001, ESE became the Democrats – Estonian Democratic Party (Demokraadid – Eesti Demokraatlik Partei, EDP). On 21 July 2005, it announced it would cooperate with the Pro Patria Union in local elections. At the beginning of 2006, there were plans to merge EDP with Eesti Iseseisvuspartei (EIP) and Põllumeeste Kogu (Farmers' Council, PK), but this did not happen. On 18 March 2006, the party congress voted to join the Pro Patria Union, but this did not happen. On 11 February 2008, the Harju county court registry warned that the numbers of EDP members had fallen to 920, 80 less than the required 1,000 threshold, and the registry gave EDP until 15 April 2008 to recover. At the beginning of 2008, there were new plans to merge EDP with EIP and PK, but again this did not happen.

== Libertas Estonia (2009–2010) ==
On 2 February 2009, it restructured itself as Libertas Eesti Erakond (Libertas Estonia, LEE) and became registered on 2 March 2009, enabling it to be officially known under that name.

On 2 April 2009, party chairman Jaan Laas announced that, after candidate approval by the party's executive board, elections would be held on 23 April 2009 for candidates wishing to stand for Libertas Estonia in the 2009 Estonian Euroelections in June.

Libertas Estonia was acknowledged by Libertas.eu as one of the (then) 11 member parties of Libertas.eu by a post on the latter's website.

== Election performance ==
Date	Election	Notes
2002	local elections (Tartu only)	40 votes (8.5%) and 0 of 9 of the municipal council
2003	Riigikogu elections	did not take part
2004	European Parliament elections	2,849 votes (1.2%)
2009	European Parliament elections	0.59% of the vote, no elected candidates.
