= Libertas France =

Libertas France is the name given to the activities of Declan Ganley's Libertas Party in France. Unlike Libertas in other countries, Libertas France was not a political party in its own right. Instead, candidates from Mouvement pour la France (MPF) and Chasse, Pêche, Nature et Traditions (CPNT) contended the 2009 European Parliament elections in France under common lists branded with the Libertas identity. The candidates retained their membership of their national parties and the national parties retained their legal identity.

== Formation ==
On 12 February 2009, European Voice (now part of Politico Europe) reported that Mouvement pour la France, the party of Philippe de Villiers and Paul-Marie Couteaux, would rename itself to Libertas for the 2009 elections. Later, the position was clarified: candidates would retain their national party membership but would run for election under Libertas lists, in a manner analogous to existing European political parties. Ganley held a press conference on 11 March 2009 in which members of MPF and CPNT announced their intentions to stand under Libertas lists in French constituencies in the 2009 European Parliament elections. Jérôme Rivière was named as the campaign director of Libertas France. During the press conference, Villiers (MPF) and Frédéric Nihous (CPNT) laid out the issues on which they would campaign: anti-Lisbon Treaty, pro-Fortress Europe, (périmètre de l’Europe) and anti-Turkish accession to the EU.

The affiliation of MPF to Libertas was not unanimously supported: 32 federation presidents signed a motion of no confidence against Philippe de Villiers. Paul-Marie Coûteaux, the existing MPF MEP for Île-de-France who had been dropped as head of the list in favor of Jérôme Rivière, also voiced his disapproval.

== Staff ==
Name	Position
Jérôme Rivière	Campaign Director

== Issues ==
On 12 March 2009, Philippe de Villiers and Frédéric Nihous gave a joint statement. They objected to a France-supported draft January 27 European Union regulation on oenological practices that allowed the blending of white wine and red wine to produce rosé wine.

== See also ==
- Jens-Peter Bonde
- Declan Ganley
- 2009 European Parliament election
- Treaty of Lisbon
