= Piast Faction =

Piast Faction Stronnictwo Piast
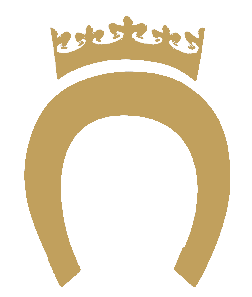
- Abbreviation: SP
- Leader: Zdzisław Podkański
- Founded: 28 March 2006; 20 years ago
- Dissolved: 18 November 2024; 22 months ago
- Split from: Polish People's Party
- Headquarters: Lublin
- Ideology: Christian democracy Agrarianism
- Political position: Centre-right to right-wing
- National affiliation: United Right
- European Parliament group: European Conservatives and Reformists (formerly); Union for Europe of the Nations (formerly)

Piast Faction (Polish: Stronnictwo Piast, SP), informally Piast Party, formerly Polish People's Party "Piast" (Polish: Polskie Stronnictwo Ludowe Piast, PSL Piast) was a political party founded in 2006. Piast refers to the medieval Piast dynasty, Poland's founding royal house. It was created after a 2006 split in the modern PSL party. Its major politicians included Zdzisław Podkański, Janusz Wojciechowski and Zbigniew Kuźmiuk. It was an affiliate party of Libertas.eu.

The party was allied with Law and Justice.
