= Independent Democrats (Czech Republic) =

Czech populist party

Independent Democrats Nezávislí demokraté
- Leader: Vladimír Železný
- Founded: 2005
- Dissolved: 2015
- Split from: Independents
- Ideology: Populism; Euroscepticism
- European affiliation: Alliance of Independent Democrats in Europe

Independent Democrats (Czech: Nezávislí demokraté or NEZDEM) was a small populist political party in the Czech Republic. Its founder Vladimír Železný, MEP, was elected its chairman during the party's convention on 6–7 August 2005. It advocates strict immigration policies, the abolition of the Senate, and review of the country's relationship with the European Union.
