= Party for Labour, Environment and Family =

Political party in Germany

The Party for Labour, Environment and Family - Christians for Germany (German: AUF - Partei für Arbeit, Umwelt und Familie - Christen für Deutschland, or AUF-Partei) was a Christian political party in Germany. Founded on 26 January 2008 in Berlin, the party did not achieve representation in federal or state-level parliaments and in March 2015, merged with the Party of Bible-abiding Christians (PBC) into the Alliance C – Christians for Germany.

The party has assessed itself as realistic political, social-Christian profile and wants marriage and family at the center of their policies. It is a member of European Christian Political Party (ECPP), a Christian-based European political party.

The party did not take part in the German federal election in 2013.

== History ==
AUF was the result of "Aufbruch 2009" (Awakening 2009) emanated from the ECPM Congresses in 2004 and 2005. Every Deputy Chairman brought his political experience from his party. This were the Centre Party, the Ecological Democratic Party (ÖDP) and Walter Weiblen, who realised his experiences from Party of Bible-abiding Christians (PBC) until his resignation as National Chairman in November 2008. Peter Schneider (AUF) became his successor on 17 January 2009. The party got first seats in local representations by changing of party membership. 2009 the party was admitted to the European elections. It organized campaign events with Eva Herman, Christa Meves and the publicist Martin Lohmann.

The manner of attempting to establish a common Christian Party is described as authoritarian and undemocratic by the PBC.

AUF also means "Arise!".
