= Social Democratic Party (Spain) =

Social Democratic Party Partido Social Demócrata
- Leader: Ernest Fenollosa
- Founded: 2005
- Dissolved: 2011
- Ideology: Social democracy Social liberalism
- Political position: Centre-left
- Town councillors: 20 / 68,286 (2007-2011)

The Social Democratic Party (Partido Social Demócrata, PSD) was a minor political party based in the Valencian Community, Spain.

It gained relevancy in the local and regional elections of May 27, 2007 in the Valencian Community, in the Community of Madrid, in Murcia, Extremadura, Cantabria, Aragón, Andalucía and Castilla La Mancha.

In the 2007 elections it gained 13 councillors and a mayoral office in the Valencian Community and seven councillors in Extremadura.

In the 2008 Spanish general election it failed to win a seat in either the Senate or Congress. It received 19,042 votes for the Congress of Deputies, which represented 0.08% of the total. Of those votes, 4,047 came from Andalucía (although the party didn't stand there in the autonomous elections) and 3,309 in the Valencian Community. The party failed to stand in the Basque Country, and in Melilla.
