= Independence/Democracy =

Former Eurosceptic political group of the European Parliament

- European Parliament group
- Name: Independence/Democracy
- English abbr.: IND/DEM
- French abbr.: IND/DEM
- Formal name: Independence/Democracy Group in the European Parliament
- Ideology: Euroscepticism
- Political position: Right-wing
- European parties: EUDemocrats
- From: 20 July 2004
- To: 1 July 2009 (de facto)
- Preceded by: Europe of Democracies and Diversities
- Succeeded by: Europe of Freedom and Democracy
- Chaired by: Nigel Farage; Hanne Dahl
- MEP(s): 37 (20–23 July 2004); 28 (January 2007); 22 (24 June 2008); 18 (11 June 2009, de facto)
- Website: http://indemgroup.org/

Independence/Democracy (IND/DEM) was a Eurosceptic political group that operated in the European Parliament between 2004 and 2009. At its height in 2004, it had 37 MEPs and it only existed during the European Parliament's 6th term. It was affiliated with the Eurosceptic Europeans United for Democracy party.

Ideologically, IND/DEM was strongly opposed to the European Union and positioned on the radical right within the right-wing spectrum. It was a very heterogeneous grouping; it also included parties such as the UK Independence Party, Greek Popular Orthodox Rally, French Movement for France, League of Polish Families, and Lega Nord. After the 2009 European Parliament election, IND/DEM lost many of its MPs and was dissolved in favour of the Europe of Freedom and Democracy (EFD). In comparison, EFD was far-right group that was nationalist and more strongly opposed immigration than IND/DEM.

== History ==
The 2004 European Parliament elections were reported as a good result for Eurosceptic parties. 37 MEPs (33 on 20 July, with four more the next day) from the UK Independence Party (UKIP), June Movement (Denmark), Movement for France (France), Northern League (Italy), ChristianUnion – Reformed Political Party (Netherlands), Popular Orthodox Rally (Greece), June List (Sweden), Independent Democrats (Czech Republic), the League of Polish Families (Poland) and an independent MEP from the Republic of Ireland, joined in the first week of the new Parliament to form the Eurosceptic group called "Independence/Democracy" (IND/DEM), succeeding the group called "Europe of Democracies and Diversities" (EDD) that had existed during the European Parliament's 1999–2004 term.

In the first week, IND/DEM assigned a UKIP MEP to the Committee on Women's Rights and Gender Equality. The MEP, Godfrey Bloom, promptly made comments including "No self-respecting small businessman with a brain in the right place would ever employ a lady of child-bearing age" and "I am here to represent Yorkshire women who always have dinner on the table when you get home. I am going to promote men's rights." The remarks engendered outrage from a range of fellow politicians.

One UKIP MEP never made it to IND/DEM. MEP Ashley Mote was expelled from UKIP prior to IND/DEM's formation when it became known that he faced charges for housing benefit fraud. Mote went on to join the far-right Identity, Tradition, Sovereignty group before being convicted in 2007.

The Northern League MEPs eventually all left the group after their expulsion from IND/DEM following an incident involving a T-shirt and the Jyllands-Posten Muhammad cartoons controversy. MEPs from the League of Polish Families also left the group, although not all and not all at once.

After having been suspended from UKIP following his arrest on fraud allegations, MEP Tom Wise left IND/DEM in June 2008.

By 24 June 2008, IND/DEM had 22 MEPs.

After the 2009 European Parliament elections, 18 IND/DEM MEPs from four Member States were elected for the 2009–2014 term (the Seventh European Parliament). The great majority of these seats (thirteen) were from the UK Independence Party, with others being two from the ChristianUnion – Reformed Political Party of the Netherlands, two from the Popular Orthodox Rally of Greece, and one from Libertas France. But that didn't meet the threshold laid down in the European Parliament's Rules of Procedure. So when the Seventh European Parliament started on 14 July 2009, IND/DEM would not qualify as a group.

On 30 June 2009, it was reported the remnants of IND/DEM were to unite with the remnants of another collapsing group, Union for a Europe of Nations (UEN), to create a new group whose official name was not yet determined.

On 1 July 2009 a press conference was held launching the new group. That press conference named the new group Europe of Freedom and Democracy. IND/DEM had ceased to exist.

== Structure ==
=== Subgroups ===
IND/DEM was a coalition of MEPs from two distinct wings of Euroscepticism: a reformist subgroup (sometimes referred to as Eurorealists) made up of those MEPs who believed that the EU was essentially desirable if reformed and who supported greater transparency and control over the EU bureaucracy, and a secessionist subgroup consisting of those MEPs (notably UKIP) who believed that the EU was inherently wrong even if reformed and who advocated withdrawal from the EU.

=== Organisation ===
IND/DEM had a joint political leadership. The group's co-chairs were Nigel Farage (UKIP) and Hanne Dahl, the latter succeeding Kathy Sinnott, who in turn succeeded long-time MEP Jens-Peter Bonde (June Movement) on his retirement in May 2008. Farage represented the secessionist subgroup, and Sinnott the reformist subgroup. The leadership was loose, enabling the two subgroups to unite around the broad principles of democracy and transparency which were embodied in its statute and to which IND/DEM MEPs were expected to adhere. The day-to-day running of the group was performed by its secretariat, and its secretaries-general were Claudine Vangrunderbeeck and Herman Verheirstraeten.

== Membership ==
=== 11 June–1 July 2009 ===
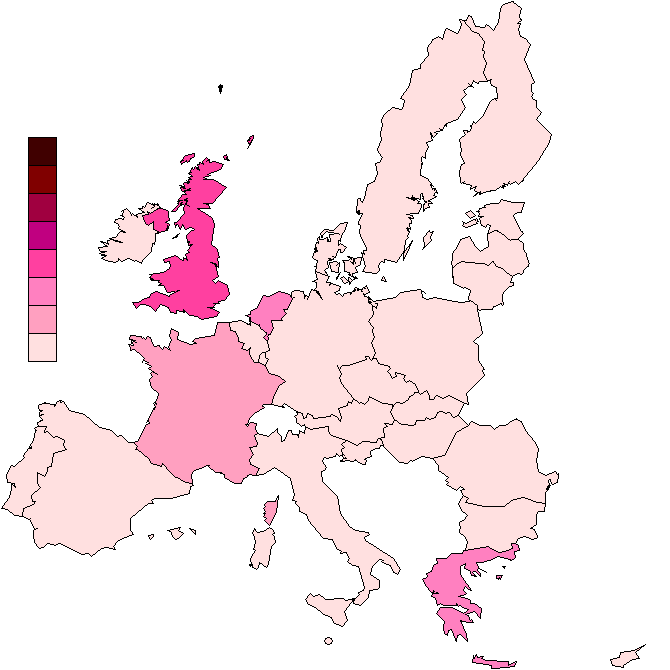
IND/DEM percentage of elected MEPs by member state 11 June 2009 (see description for sources) no MEPs 1% to 5% 5% to 10% 10% to 20% 20% to 30% 30% to 40% 40% to 50% 50% plus

After the 2009 European Parliament elections, 18 IND/DEM MEPs (too few for a viable group) were elected as follows:

Country	Name		Ideology	MEPs
United Kingdom	UK Independence Party	UKIP	Right-wing populism British nationalism	13 / 72
France	Libertas France	Libertas	Populism; Euroscepticism	1 / 72
Netherlands	Christian Union–SGP	CU–SGP	Christian democracy Euroscepticism	2 / 25
Greece	Popular Orthodox Rally	LAOS	Religious conservatism Right-wing populism	2 / 22

=== 24 July 2008 – 11 June 2009 ===
IND/DEM member parties as of 24 July 2008 were as follows:

Country	Name		Ideology
United Kingdom	UK Independence Party	UKIP	Right-wing populism British nationalism
France	Movement for France	MPF	Conservatism; French nationalism
Netherlands	Christian Union–SGP	CU–SGP	Christian democracy Euroscepticism
Greece	Popular Orthodox Rally	LAOS	Religious conservatism Right-wing populism
Denmark	June Movement	JB	Euroscepticism; Social liberalism
Sweden	June List	jl	Euroscepticism; Populism
Czech Republic	Independent Democrats	NEZDEM	Euroscepticism; Populism
Poland	League of Polish Families	LPR	National conservatism Political Catholicism

=== Membership by country at December 2007 ===
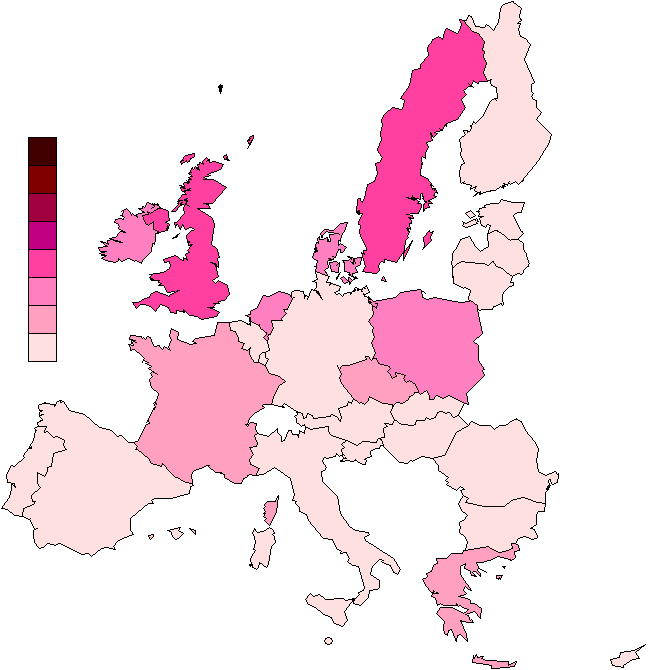
IND/DEM percentage of MEPs by member state December 2007 (see description for sources) no MEPs 1% to 5% 5% to 10% 10% to 20% 20% to 30% 30% to 40% 40% to 50% 50% plus

A December 2007 European Parliament document considered the groups. Page 9 of that document had a table. That table gave the number of MEPs for each group and member state at December 2007. That table's data for IND/DEM is depicted as percentages in the diagram on the right.

Such support for IND/DEM as was expressed came from Northern European states, with especial reference to the member states of the North-West. Its strongholds were Sweden and Denmark, who sent "June list" MEPs from June List and June Movement to the Parliament, and the United Kingdom, with 13% of its MEPs at December 2007 coming from UKIP and sitting with IND/DEM. As of December 2007 no member state had more than 13% of its MEPs sitting with IND/DEM and eighteen member states (Austria, Belgium, Bulgaria, Cyprus, Estonia, Finland, Germany, Hungary, Italy, Latvia, Lithuania, Luxembourg, Malta, Portugal, Romania, Slovakia, Slovenia, Spain) had none.

=== Membership at formation at 20–23 July 2004 ===
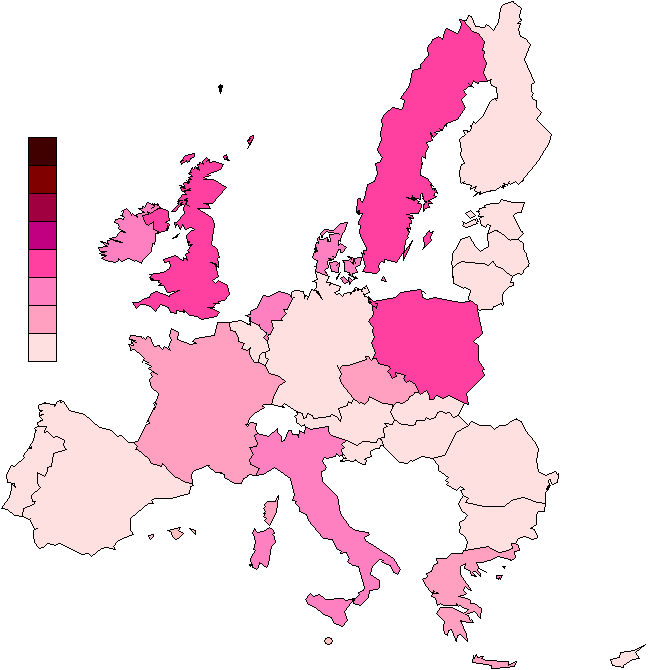
IND/DEM percentage of elected MEPs by member state 20–23 July 2004 (see description for sources) no MEPs 1% to 5% 5% to 10% 10% to 20% 20% to 30% 30% to 40% 40% to 50% 50% plus

The IND/DEM MEPs at 20–23 July 2004 were as follows:

Country	Name		Ideology	MEPs	Notes
United Kingdom	UK Independence Party	UKIP	Right-wing populism British nationalism	11 / 78	Robert Kilroy-Silk, Nigel Farage, Gerard Batten, Godfrey Bloom, Graham Booth, Derek Roland Clark, Roger Knapman, Michael Henry Nattrass, Jeffrey Titford, John Whittaker, Tom Wise
France	Movement for France	MPF	Conservatism; French nationalism	3 / 78	Paul-Marie Coûteaux, Patrick Louis, Philippe de Villiers
Netherlands	Christian Union–SGP	CU–SGP	Christian democracy Euroscepticism	2 / 27	Johannes Blokland, Bastiaan Belder
Greece	Popular Orthodox Rally	LAOS	Religious conservatism Right-wing populism	1 / 24	Georgios Georgiou
Denmark	June Movement	JB	Euroscepticism; Social liberalism	1 / 14	Jens-Peter Bonde
Sweden	June List	jl	Euroscepticism; Populism	3 / 19	Hélène Goudin, Nils Lundgren, Lars Magnus Wohlin
Czech Republic	Independent Democrats	NEZDEM	Euroscepticism; Populism	1 / 24	Vladimír Železný
Poland	League of Polish Families	LPR	National conservatism Political Catholicism	10 / 54	Wojciech Wierzejski, Urszula Krupa, Witold Tomczak, Filip Adwent, Sylwester Chruszcz, Maciej Giertych, Dariusz Maciej Grabowski, Mirosław Mariusz Piotrowski, Bogdan Pęk, Bogusław Rogalski
Italy	Lega Nord	LN	Regionalism; Right-wing populism	4 / 78	Mario Borghezio, (joined 21 July) Umberto Bossi, (joined 21 July) Matteo Salvini, (joined 21 July) Francesco Enrico Speroni (joined 21 July)
Ireland	Kathy Sinnott (Ind.)		–	1 / 13	Kathy Sinnott

== Activities ==
=== In the news ===
Activities performed by IND/DEM in the period between 1 June 2004 and 1 June 2008 that resulted in an entry on Google News include:

- seeking to allow Parliament to be filmed;
- criticising EC President Barroso for taking a cruise on a yacht owned by Spiro Latsis prior to the Commission giving a Latsis shipyard a grant of €10 million;
- trying to get a European Parliament auditor's report on alleged abuses of staff allowances published;
- opposing the appointment of Rocco Buttiglione as Justice Commissioner;
- arguing against the Constitution Treaty,
- arguing against the Lisbon Treaty,
- arguing against a deeper Europe;
- expelling Lega Nord and the League of Polish Families;
- arguing against the two-person Presidency,
- arguing against the two-seat Parliament,
- arguing against attempts to fund plans to improve EP turnout;
- arguing for greater control of the commission by Parliament,
- arguing for decentralisation,
- arguing for mandatory lobbying disclosure,
- supporting whistleblower Hans-Peter Martin.

=== Parliamentary activity profile ===
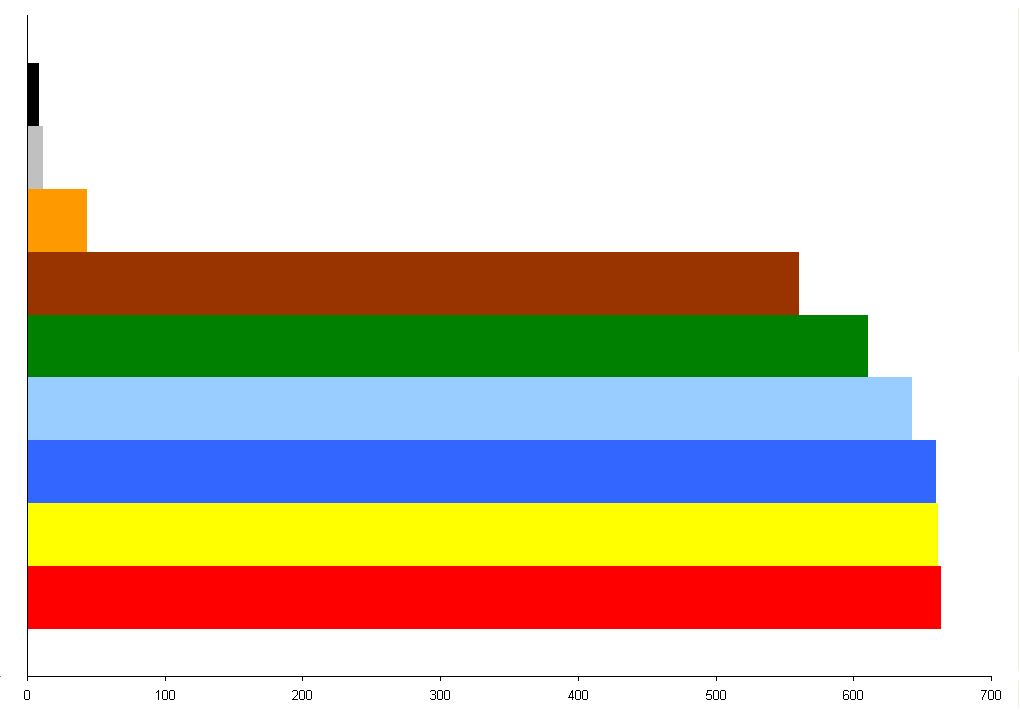
Group parliamentary activity profile, 1 August 2004 to 1 August 2008 (see description for sources) IND/DEM: 43 motions

The debates and votes in the European Parliament are tracked by its website and categorised by the Groups that participate in them and the rule of procedure that they fall into. The results give a profile for each Group by category and the total indicates the Group's level of participation in Parliamentary debates. The activity profile for each Group for the period 1 August 2004 to 1 August 2008 in the Sixth European Parliament is given on the diagram on the right. IND/DEM is denoted in orange.

The website shows IND/DEM as participating in 43 motions, making it one of the most inactive Groups during the period.

=== Publications ===
IND/DEM publications included the Prague Declaration of October 2005, which restated their disapproval of the Constitution Treaty and belief that the values it embodied should not be resurrected, and the Delphi Declaration of July 2007, which made similar points concerning the Treaty of Lisbon. IND/DEM also published a newsletter called EU Watch, which gave a eurosceptic view on the EU activities of the day.
