= Libertas Sweden =

Libertas Sverige
- Founded: 3 March 2009
- Ideology: anti-Lisbon Treaty; Euroscepticism
- European affiliation: Libertas.eu
- Colours: blue, gold

Website
- www.libertas.eu/sweden

Libertas Sweden (Swedish: Libertas Sverige) is a political party in Sweden. It intended to contend the 2009 European Parliament elections under a common banner with Declan Ganley's Libertas.eu.

== History ==
On 26 February 2009, Libertas announced that it wanted to open a branch in Sweden and appealed for the 1500 signatures required to register as a political party in Sweden. The results were submitted to the Valmyndigheten (the Swedish Election Authority) 58 minutes before the deadline expired. The results were not submitted as a list of signatures: instead, a document from a Notary Public certifying that the signatures existed was submitted in its place.

When Libertas Sweden (Libertas Sverige) was set up Sören Wibe of Junilistan stated that Ganley had visited Sweden in January and offered Junilistan 10 million kronor (SEK) to rename the party to "Junilistan – Libertas", and that Junilistan had rejected the offer and Libertas.

Libertas.eu held a press conference on 27 April at which Stefan Kihlberg, the former party secretary of Ny Demokrati (NyD) was introduced as the head of the Libertas list in Sweden.

== European Parliament elections, 2009 ==
Libertas Sweden intended to contend the 2009 Euroelections on the specific issue of a referendum on the Lisbon Treaty. The policies and core values of the European political party Libertas.eu were on its website or on the main article here.

On 21 May 2009 Libertas Sweden announced that it was ending its campaign, stating that it did not have the resources to cover the cost of printing and transporting ballots.

== See also ==
- Libertas Party
- Jens-Peter Bonde
- Declan Ganley
- 2009 European Parliament election
- Treaty of Lisbon
