= Results of the 2004 European Parliament election in Sweden =

Sweden held its European Parliament election to nominate Sweden's 18 members of the European Parliament on 13 June 2004. The election was held in the same week as 24 other member states.

== Results ==
Party	Votes	%	Seats	+/–
Swedish Social Democratic Party	616,963	24.56	5	–1
Moderate Party	458,398	18.25	4	–1
June List	363,472	14.47	3	New
Left Party	321,344	12.79	2	–1
Liberal People's Party	247,750	9.86	2	–1
Centre Party	157,258	6.26	1	0
Green Party	149,603	5.96	1	–1
Christian Democrats	142,704	5.68	1	–1
Sweden Democrats	28,303	1.13	0	0
EU Opponents	15,505	0.62	0	New
National Democrats	7,209	0.29	0	New
Socialist Justice Party	2,087	0.08	0	0
Freedom and Justice Party	147	0.01	0	New
European Workers Party	137	0.01	0	0
Swedish National Democratic Party	66	0.00	0	New
Transparency Party	37	0.00	0	New
Union Citizens' Fight for an EU Superstate	36	0.00	0	New
Right Party the Conservatives	29	0.00	0	New
Vision Europe Party	25	0.00	0	New
EU Critical Santa Party	19	0.00	0	New
Viking Party	9	0.00	0	0
International Integration Party	8	0.00	0	New
Motbokspartiet	8	0.00	0	New
EU out of Sweden Party	4	0.00	0	New
Communist League	2	0.00	0	0
EU-Critic Party	2	0.00	0	New
Republican Right	1	0.00	0	New
Other parties	943	0.04	0	–
Total	2,512,069	100.00	19	–3
Valid votes	2,512,069	97.20		
Invalid/blank votes	72,395	2.80		
Total votes	2,584,464	100.00		
Registered voters/turnout	6,827,870	37.85		
Source: Val

== Results by county ==
The Swedish results are counted by county only, since the seats are shared on a national basis, rendering eight fewer counting areas than in Riksdag elections.

=== Percentage share ===
Location	Land	Turnout	Share	Votes	S	M	JL	V	FP	C	MP	KD	SD	Other
Blekinge	G	32.5	1.5	36,720	28.6	17.2	12.8	11.5	8.1	7.8	5.2	5.3	3.0	0.7
Dalarna	S	34.9	2.9	72,979	28.3	11.9	19.2	14.7	5.6	6.6	5.7	6.4	0.5	1.1
Gotland	G	35.7	0.6	15,390	27.1	15.0	11.2	10.7	5.4	20.3	6.8	2.7	0.2	0.5
Gävleborg	N	33.0	2.8	69,629	26.3	10.3	18.6	14.4	6.2	7.6	6.1	4.0	0.9	5.6
Halland	G	38.8	3.2	80,837	23.4	20.1	15.5	9.2	10.4	10.2	5.0	4.5	0.9	0.8
Jämtland	N	38.5	1.5	37,583	23.9	8.5	18.3	16.9	3.8	14.6	6.2	2.7	0.2	4.8
Jönköping	G	36.6	3.5	87,995	22.6	14.9	15.0	9.6	6.5	9.2	4.2	16.1	0.7	1.2
Kalmar	G	33.5	2.4	59,314	29.2	14.8	14.7	10.0	5.7	13.7	4.8	6.2	0.4	0.5
Kronoberg	G	35.0	1.8	46,407	25.3	16.2	14.8	12.2	6.5	11.4	4.9	6.7	1.5	0.5
Norrbotten	N	36.2	2.8	69,129	30.2	10.6	12.6	29.1	3.3	6.1	3.5	3.2	0.2	1.2
Skåne	G	34.8	11.8	296,465	25.9	23.7	12.6	8.3	10.6	5.2	5.6	4.3	3.4	0.4
Stockholm	S	41.7	22.4	562,097	19.8	26.3	14.2	10.6	13.5	2.3	6.7	5.1	0.8	0.8
Södermanland	S	36.4	2.8	69,394	31.3	17.3	13.8	10.0	8.0	6.7	6.8	4.7	0.5	0.9
Uppsala	S	39.6	3.5	87,688	22.1	17.7	15.4	11.2	11.5	7.0	7.7	6.1	0.8	0.5
Värmland	S	34.1	2.8	70,151	30.3	14.2	13.5	12.9	7.4	8.3	5.9	4.9	1.4	1.2
Västerbotten	N	40.8	3.2	79,361	20.6	6.4	9.1	40.8	6.6	6.6	3.9	5.2	0.2	0.7
Västernorrland	N	34.8	2.6	64,842	30.0	9.4	15.7	15.0	5.9	8.1	6.3	5.1	0.8	3.7
Västmanland	S	36.1	2.7	68,746	28.5	15.6	16.5	12.1	8.3	6.6	5.7	5.4	0.6	0.7
Västra Götaland	G	38.7	17.2	433,197	23.4	16.1	14.1	13.7	12.4	5.7	6.4	6.3	1.0	0.9
Örebro	S	38.4	3.1	78,138	31.6	12.6	17.4	11.2	7.0	5.6	5.3	7.5	1.3	0.5
Östergötland	G	41.5	5.0	126,007	26.7	16.4	16.1	10.0	7.4	10.0	6.2	5.9	0.6	0.7
Total		37.9	100.0	2,512,069	24.6	18.2	14.5	12.8	9.9	6.3	6.0	5.7	1.1	1.0
Source: val.se

=== By votes ===
Location	Land	Turnout	Share	Votes	S	M	JL	V	FP	C	MP	KD	SD	Other
Blekinge	G	32.5	1.5	36,720	10,506	6,304	4,693	4,205	2,956	2,867	1,894	1,955	1,089	251
Dalarna	S	34.9	2.9	72,979	20,652	8,673	14,034	10,730	4,069	4,852	4,169	4,659	344	797
Gotland	G	35.7	0.6	15,390	4,174	2,304	1,724	1,651	832	3,130	1,052	421	32	70
Gävleborg	N	33.0	2.8	69,629	18,283	7,206	12,925	9,992	4,314	5,319	4,226	2,780	661	3,923
Halland	G	38.8	3.2	80,837	18,888	16,218	12,523	7,469	8,387	8,205	4,064	3,663	761	659
Jämtland	N	38.5	1.5	37,583	8,985	3,196	6,884	6,368	1,446	5,492	2,340	1,003	62	1,807
Jönköping	G	36.6	3.5	87,995	19,919	13,092	13,161	8,483	5,741	8,118	3,674	14,153	610	1,044
Kalmar	G	33.5	2.4	59,314	17,334	8,781	8,713	5,920	3,371	8,115	2,826	3,675	266	313
Kronoberg	G	35.0	1.8	46,407	11,750	7,529	6,880	5,641	3,021	5,301	2,264	3,126	678	217
Norrbotten	N	36.2	2.8	69,129	20,911	7,303	8,708	20,092	2,312	4,184	2,439	2,208	161	811
Skåne	G	34.8	11.8	296,465	76,748	70,334	37,307	24,680	31,558	15,335	16,505	12,650	10,032	1,316
Stockholm	S	41.7	22.4	562,097	111,314	147,849	79,752	59,373	75,749	13,039	37,630	28,485	4,348	4,558
Södermanland	S	36.4	2.8	69,394	21,691	12,013	9,606	6,947	5,571	4,638	4,693	3,271	334	630
Uppsala	S	39.6	3.5	87,688	19,392	15,521	13,547	9,814	10,094	6,127	6,787	5,329	679	398
Värmland	S	34.1	2.8	70,151	21,252	9,994	9,499	9,020	5,182	5,850	4,134	3,420	993	807
Västerbotten	N	40.8	3.2	79,361	16,327	5,116	7,187	32,381	5,239	5,207	3,077	4,116	195	516
Västernorrland	N	34.8	2.6	64,842	19,485	6,096	10,153	9,758	3,802	5,232	4,085	3,311	520	2,400
Västmanland	S	36.1	2.7	68,746	19,567	10,719	11,351	8,309	5,727	4,562	3,930	3,728	389	464
Västra Götaland	G	38.7	17.2	433,197	101,514	69,632	60,986	59,140	53,535	24,650	27,869	27,488	4,336	4,047
Örebro	S	38.4	3.1	78,138	24,668	9,827	13,569	8,770	5,496	4,408	4,170	5,854	1,008	368
Östergötland	G	41.5	5.0	126,007	33,603	20,691	20,270	12,601	9,348	12,627	7,775	7,409	805	878
Total		37.9	100.0	2,512,069	616,963	458,398	363,472	321,344	247,750	157,258	149,603	142,704	28,303	26,274
Source: val.se

== Municipal results ==
=== Blekinge ===
Location	Turnout	Share	Votes	S	M	JL	V	FP	C	MP	KD	SD	Other
Karlshamn	30.5	19.5	7,162	30.1	16.2	11.0	14.3	7.7	7.1	6.7	4.9	1.3	0.7
Karlskrona	35.2	43.9	16,120	26.8	18.4	13.6	9.4	9.1	7.2	5.0	6.0	3.4	0.9
Olofström	30.8	8.2	3,022	36.7	11.1	9.7	14.5	6.1	7.9	4.0	6.3	3.2	0.6
Ronneby	33.0	19.4	7,106	26.9	15.4	16.6	11.8	7.6	10.1	5.1	3.8	2.5	0.3
Sölvesborg	26.7	9.0	3,310	30.7	22.5	7.1	11.8	6.3	7.1	3.7	5.3	5.2	0.3
Total	32.5	1.5	36,720	28.6	17.2	12.8	11.5	8.1	7.8	5.2	5.3	3.0	0.7
Source: val.se

=== Dalarna ===
Location	Turnout	Share	Votes	S	M	JL	V	FP	C	MP	KD	SD	Other
Avesta	34.1	8.0	5,809	33.6	10.4	15.0	16.4	5.1	7.8	5.0	5.1	0.4	1.1
Borlänge	35.9	17.1	12,445	33.5	10.2	17.8	14.9	6.0	5.0	5.5	4.8	1.1	1.1
Falun	38.1	21.6	15,745	24.5	15.5	18.3	13.8	7.2	5.6	7.0	6.5	0.2	1.5
Gagnef	35.0	3.5	2,559	27.4	10.3	19.5	12.7	4.8	10.3	5.2	7.7	0.3	1.8
Hedemora	34.4	5.6	4,053	26.2	10.1	21.4	16.0	3.8	8.9	6.5	5.4	0.3	1.4
Leksand	38.0	6.1	4,486	21.6	14.0	20.6	13.3	5.1	8.5	5.6	10.6	0.2	0.5
Ludvika	35.7	9.8	7,116	35.0	10.8	18.2	18.2	5.2	3.0	4.7	3.7	0.5	0.7
Malung	31.0	3.4	2,500	31.3	13.6	14.4	15.1	6.8	9.3	4.5	4.1	0.4	0.5
Mora	30.8	6.4	4,684	21.2	11.3	24.2	12.7	5.4	6.1	6.1	11.9	0.3	0.8
Orsa	34.9	2.5	1,855	21.8	10.6	23.2	15.0	4.4	6.8	7.9	8.4	1.1	0.9
Rättvik	33.7	3.9	2,849	23.5	14.6	21.6	12.0	6.8	7.2	6.4	6.1	0.5	1.3
Smedjebacken	34.5	4.0	2,946	35.0	9.7	21.7	16.3	3.1	5.3	4.4	3.4	0.5	0.7
Säter	34.9	3.9	2,863	24.8	9.2	23.1	14.5	4.2	12.1	4.6	6.3	0.2	1.0
Vansbro	29.1	2.2	1,588	29.0	8.5	17.4	13.9	3.1	12.1	2.5	12.9	0.1	0.5
Älvdalen	25.2	2.0	1,481	27.5	8.3	24.5	12.3	3.3	8.5	5.4	7.7	0.7	1.8
Total	34.9	2.9	72,979	28.3	11.9	19.2	14.7	5.6	6.6	5.7	6.4	0.5	1.1
Source: val.se

=== Gotland ===
Location	Turnout	Share	Votes	S	M	JL	V	FP	C	MP	KD	SD	Other
Gotland	35.7	100.0	15,390	27.1	15.0	11.2	10.7	5.4	20.3	6.8	2.7	0.2	0.5
Total	35.7	0.6	15,390	27.1	15.0	11.2	10.7	5.4	20.3	6.8	2.7	0.2	0.5
Source: val.se

=== Gävleborg ===
Location	Turnout	Share	Votes	S	M	JL	V	FP	C	MP	KD	SD	EU-M	Other
Bollnäs	28.4	8.2	5,713	21.6	9.5	19.8	14.4	5.1	15.2	6.0	4.1	0.4	3.1	1.0
Gävle	35.5	35.3	24,587	27.9	13.5	17.8	14.0	8.7	3.9	7.4	4.1	1.6	1.0	0.1
Hofors	31.8	3.5	2,458	40.4	7.8	14.3	14.9	5.2	6.3	3.9	2.1	1.7	3.2	0.2
Hudiksvall	34.7	14.1	9,786	20.5	8.5	19.4	13.6	3.4	8.6	5.9	3.3	0.2	16.3	0.2
Ljusdal	29.7	6.4	4,471	20.3	8.3	19.9	15.3	5.1	8.3	6.9	3.0	0.4	12.4	0.1
Nordanstig	31.4	3.4	2,390	16.7	5.1	22.7	12.3	3.5	13.2	4.7	4.9	0.7	16.2	0.1
Ockelbo	34.5	2.3	1,604	28.9	8.5	17.6	20.7	3.3	14.2	3.7	2.0	0.4	0.4	0.2
Ovanåker	28.3	3.7	2,610	22.4	7.3	18.2	7.7	4.2	20.1	4.6	11.6	0.0	3.5	0.4
Sandviken	33.3	13.5	9,392	33.4	10.7	16.7	15.6	7.1	5.5	5.0	3.9	1.1	1.0	0.1
Söderhamn	32.1	9.5	6,618	25.7	7.5	21.2	15.9	4.2	8.2	4.9	3.2	0.8	6.0	2.3
Total	33.0	2.8	69,629	26.3	10.3	18.6	14.4	6.2	7.6	6.1	4.0	0.9	5.2	0.4
Source: val.se

=== Halland ===
Location	Turnout	Share	Votes	S	M	JL	V	FP	C	MP	KD	SD	Other
Falkenberg	39.2	14.0	11,337	25.5	16.1	12.5	9.5	7.2	17.9	5.3	4.4	1.3	0.2
Halmstad	37.4	30.5	24,682	27.1	20.6	16.5	8.9	9.5	6.3	5.0	3.8	1.0	1.3
Hylte	33.8	3.1	2,494	29.0	13.4	16.6	8.1	5.3	17.1	4.3	4.2	1.0	1.1
Kungsbacka	41.6	25.2	20,376	15.7	26.3	16.7	8.2	16.5	5.6	4.8	5.6	0.4	0.2
Laholm	34.2	7.1	5,769	20.2	18.5	16.7	7.2	6.2	17.8	5.0	4.4	1.9	2.1
Varberg	40.2	20.0	16,179	26.0	15.7	13.9	11.9	8.4	12.6	5.3	4.5	0.9	0.7
Total	38.8	3.2	80,837	23.4	20.1	15.5	9.2	10.4	10.2	5.0	4.5	0.9	0.8
Source: val.se

=== Jämtland ===
Location	Turnout	Share	Votes	S	M	JL	V	FP	C	MP	KD	SD	EU-M	Other
Berg	35.0	5.6	2,092	18.1	5.5	21.5	15.8	2.4	19.9	6.4	3.3	0.1	6.7	0.3
Bräcke	44.9	6.5	2,443	29.1	7.0	20.3	19.6	2.0	11.6	3.8	1.0	0.2	4.9	0.5
Härjedalen	32.5	7.5	2,805	31.9	7.0	14.0	18.9	4.6	11.9	4.5	2.4	0.2	4.2	0.4
Krokom	38.5	10.6	3,996	22.1	7.2	18.3	16.2	3.1	19.5	7.3	2.5	0.3	3.3	0.3
Ragunda	49.3	5.7	2,161	25.1	5.3	20.6	22.1	1.8	13.7	3.7	1.2	0.3	5.8	0.3
Strömsund	36.5	10.0	3,755	26.7	4.8	18.8	19.3	1.7	11.2	3.5	2.1	0.1	11.4	0.3
Åre	38.6	7.4	2,784	18.8	10.9	16.9	12.0	4.3	18.5	8.5	4.1	0.1	5.7	0.1
Östersund	38.7	46.7	17,547	23.1	10.4	18.2	16.2	5.0	13.9	7.1	3.0	0.1	2.6	0.4
Total	38.5	1.5	37,583	23.9	8.5	18.3	16.9	3.8	14.6	6.2	2.7	0.2	4.5	0.3
Source: val.se

=== Jönköping ===
Location	Turnout	Share	Votes	S	M	JL	V	FP	C	MP	KD	SD	Other
Aneby	34.7	1.9	1,683	17.2	9.4	15.5	8.7	5.4	16.1	4.9	21.3	0.5	0.8
Eksjö	36.6	5.2	4,537	22.0	16.2	11.0	8.7	6.3	15.5	4.3	13.3	0.5	2.2
Gislaved	33.9	8.0	7,073	27.9	17.3	14.1	6.8	5.9	13.1	3.5	10.0	1.0	0.5
Gnosjö	37.7	2.9	2,552	18.3	16.7	13.9	7.3	5.4	9.3	2.6	24.6	1.2	0.6
Habo	38.3	2.9	2,573	21.4	15.5	13.4	11.0	6.5	7.8	3.3	20.0	0.1	1.0
Jönköping	37.8	38.1	33,500	22.1	15.7	14.3	10.4	8.2	5.6	4.7	17.1	0.6	1.3
Mullsjö	37.6	2.2	1,934	18.6	12.7	23.9	10.9	4.6	4.9	4.6	19.3	0.2	0.4
Nässjö	35.3	8.7	7,665	26.5	12.3	15.8	10.1	4.9	10.3	4.3	14.0	0.7	1.1
Sävsjö	35.7	3.2	2,855	17.8	13.2	15.5	8.3	3.5	14.7	3.7	20.5	1.2	1.6
Tranås	33.4	5.1	4,475	23.6	15.2	18.3	11.0	6.1	7.4	4.6	12.9	0.3	0.4
Vaggeryd	35.9	3.7	3,291	22.7	11.2	13.7	11.1	5.9	10.2	4.2	19.2	0.8	1.0
Vetlanda	34.8	7.7	6,799	20.4	13.3	15.9	9.9	4.5	15.1	4.0	13.9	0.5	2.4
Värnamo	38.5	10.3	9,058	23.8	14.9	15.9	8.5	6.1	10.0	3.1	15.6	1.3	0.7
Total	36.6	3.5	87,995	22.6	14.9	15.0	9.6	6.5	9.2	4.2	16.1	0.7	1.2
Source: val.se

=== Kalmar ===
Location	Turnout	Share	Votes	S	M	JL	V	FP	C	MP	KD	SD	Other
Borgholm	34.3	5.0	2,977	19.4	17.6	13.9	7.9	5.4	24.8	4.1	5.9	0.2	0.6
Emmaboda	34.9	4.3	2,535	35.6	11.7	14.2	9.4	3.6	14.6	4.9	4.9	0.5	0.6
Hultsfred	31.2	5.8	3,422	29.0	11.2	17.1	11.8	3.5	16.1	4.2	6.3	0.4	0.5
Högsby	30.0	2.3	1,365	33.8	13.4	11.9	8.4	3.6	16.4	3.2	8.2	0.4	0.7
Kalmar	35.2	27.3	16,187	28.4	17.8	14.7	10.1	8.1	8.2	5.8	6.1	0.4	0.5
Mönsterås	31.4	5.3	3,114	30.8	10.8	16.4	9.6	3.4	18.2	3.4	5.8	0.2	1.4
Mörbylånga	38.3	6.5	3,859	28.7	16.9	12.7	8.0	6.4	17.4	4.2	4.9	0.5	0.1
Nybro	32.6	8.3	4,936	34.7	11.4	14.1	10.3	4.8	13.8	3.4	6.6	0.5	0.4
Oskarshamn	30.7	10.2	6,061	33.1	14.1	15.5	10.8	5.1	7.5	3.9	8.4	0.7	0.7
Torsås	32.4	3.0	1,786	22.3	13.2	14.1	6.7	4.5	24.9	4.5	8.6	0.7	0.6
Vimmerby	32.5	6.3	3,755	23.5	12.4	12.8	11.2	3.5	23.1	5.3	6.9	0.3	0.9
Västervik	33.7	15.7	9,317	29.4	15.1	15.6	10.5	5.7	13.1	5.3	4.7	0.5	0.2
Total	33.5	2.4	59,314	29.2	14.8	14.7	10.0	5.7	13.7	4.8	6.2	0.4	0.5
Source: val.se

=== Kronoberg ===
Location	Turnout	Share	Votes	S	M	JL	V	FP	C	MP	KD	SD	Other
Alvesta	33.6	10.1	4,671	24.9	13.9	17.6	11.6	4.7	14.3	4.0	6.3	2.4	0.4
Lessebo	32.6	4.1	1,921	36.0	11.5	13.6	17.8	5.2	7.8	4.6	2.9	0.6	0.1
Ljungby	34.3	14.7	6,799	24.9	13.1	16.5	11.2	5.3	13.7	4.6	8.6	1.3	0.8
Markaryd	30.3	4.6	2,146	28.7	11.6	16.1	7.4	4.3	12.8	3.6	10.3	3.1	2.1
Tingsryd	30.4	6.5	3,001	21.9	16.7	16.1	10.1	3.2	19.7	4.3	6.0	1.8	0.2
Uppvidinge	32.5	4.9	2,291	25.5	12.9	15.5	13.3	4.7	17.7	4.0	4.3	2.0	0.2
Växjö	38.0	46.9	21,781	24.3	18.5	13.7	13.6	8.4	8.4	5.4	6.5	1.1	0.1
Älmhult	32.8	8.2	3,797	28.0	18.0	13.6	7.2	5.6	11.9	5.2	7.1	1.8	1.7
Total	35.0	1.8	46,407	25.3	16.2	14.8	12.2	6.5	11.4	4.9	6.7	1.5	0.5
Source: val.se

=== Norrbotten ===
Location	Turnout	Share	Votes	S	M	JL	V	FP	C	MP	KD	SD	Other
Arjeplog	39.2	1.4	983	30.9	4.8	11.1	36.3	2.8	6.6	3.7	3.2	0.4	0.2
Arvidsjaur	39.2	3.1	2,140	32.8	6.9	9.5	33.7	3.6	6.2	1.9	1.8	0.1	3.5
Boden	38.0	11.8	8,146	30.2	14.0	12.6	28.0	3.1	4.0	3.5	3.6	0.2	0.8
Gällivare	25.9	5.6	3,855	24.4	11.6	12.3	41.1	1.5	2.4	3.0	2.5	0.6	0.6
Haparanda	28.4	2.6	1,813	27.4	13.8	5.5	22.8	1.5	23.4	2.4	2.8	0.2	0.2
Jokkmokk	33.7	2.1	1,467	26.1	7.2	12.6	39.3	2.7	2.4	6.7	2.0	0.2	0.9
Kalix	35.2	6.9	4,754	37.5	9.7	11.2	24.3	2.7	6.6	3.5	2.3	0.3	1.8
Kiruna	28.5	7.2	4,982	25.4	7.5	12.5	40.7	2.2	2.7	3.5	2.4	0.5	2.7
Luleå	38.5	30.5	21,087	29.1	14.4	13.8	24.2	5.1	4.5	4.5	3.1	0.2	1.0
Pajala	33.7	2.7	1,840	21.7	7.6	5.5	43.9	1.0	13.8	1.8	4.2	0.1	0.3
Piteå	42.1	19.0	13,113	35.1	6.9	15.1	26.8	3.2	4.6	3.0	4.1	0.1	1.1
Älvsbyn	38.0	3.7	2,544	31.6	4.8	12.3	34.2	2.0	7.1	2.3	3.9	0.3	1.3
Överkalix	33.6	1.5	1,062	35.2	4.2	8.2	34.3	2.3	12.0	1.4	2.4	0.1	0.0
Övertorneå	34.8	1.9	1,343	18.6	6.6	4.6	23.9	1.1	40.8	1.1	2.5	0.0	0.8
Total	36.2	2.8	69,129	30.2	10.6	12.6	29.1	3.3	6.1	3.5	3.2	0.2	1.2
Source: val.se

=== Skåne ===
Location	Turnout	Share	Votes	S	M	JL	V	FP	C	MP	KD	SD	Other
Bjuv	24.8	0.8	2,411	41.7	19.1	8.2	8.1	4.7	5.4	3.7	3.4	5.2	0.5
Bromölla	28.1	0.8	2,493	38.2	12.4	8.9	16.7	5.9	5.5	5.7	4.0	1.9	0.8
Burlöv	33.4	1.2	3,632	34.8	18.4	11.2	8.3	9.6	2.8	4.6	3.0	6.7	0.6
Båstad	37.4	1.4	4,111	12.9	36.6	13.9	4.7	10.6	11.0	3.9	4.0	1.4	1.1
Eslöv	32.1	2.3	6,716	29.6	16.9	10.7	7.8	8.2	10.8	5.2	3.0	7.4	0.3
Helsingborg	34.0	10.3	30,625	26.1	26.4	13.4	7.0	10.1	2.4	5.0	4.6	4.5	0.5
Hässleholm	34.4	4.2	12,484	24.1	17.0	14.9	9.2	6.4	10.9	5.0	8.0	4.0	0.5
Höganäs	39.9	2.3	6,952	20.6	33.4	13.5	5.1	10.9	4.1	4.8	5.6	1.9	0.1
Hörby	31.4	1.1	3,244	20.6	16.3	16.5	4.7	5.9	18.1	5.0	5.8	4.2	2.8
Höör	32.9	1.2	3,423	19.7	21.9	15.2	6.3	8.5	8.7	7.4	4.9	5.5	1.8
Klippan	27.9	1.1	3,206	26.7	22.7	10.9	7.7	6.2	7.6	5.5	6.4	2.8	3.5
Kristianstad	33.9	6.4	18,913	25.9	21.5	14.6	8.5	9.8	6.8	5.4	5.0	2.4	0.2
Kävlinge	34.0	2.1	6,281	28.3	23.4	13.4	5.2	9.8	5.7	4.3	2.8	6.9	0.2
Landskrona	31.4	2.9	8,719	33.4	21.8	12.0	6.7	9.4	2.6	4.4	3.1	6.2	0.3
Lomma	46.2	2.1	6,260	21.8	33.3	13.3	3.6	15.0	3.0	3.5	4.2	2.2	0.1
Lund	46.0	11.9	35,178	20.9	20.2	10.8	11.1	18.5	3.5	9.0	4.6	1.0	0.3
Malmö	34.6	22.9	67,853	28.5	22.6	11.6	10.7	11.7	1.5	6.4	3.1	3.6	0.4
Osby	30.8	1.0	2,884	29.8	12.2	15.4	11.1	5.1	10.7	4.9	6.7	3.3	0.7
Perstorp	26.6	0.4	1,308	28.3	21.2	14.6	9.6	7.2	7.8	3.9	4.6	2.1	0.8
Simrishamn	34.5	1.7	5,175	23.1	25.7	12.2	8.3	8.9	10.2	5.2	4.7	1.4	0.2
Sjöbo	28.4	1.2	3,584	22.8	19.5	16.0	7.2	5.2	13.9	4.8	5.1	5.0	0.5
Skurup	30.9	1.1	3,148	24.1	22.5	13.0	7.4	8.1	11.7	4.8	3.4	4.9	0.1
Staffanstorp	39.1	1.9	5,623	26.7	25.9	16.2	4.4	11.5	5.1	3.7	3.8	2.1	0.5
Svalöv	33.2	1.0	3,005	27.3	19.6	8.5	5.6	6.8	18.0	5.0	3.2	5.3	0.7
Svedala	31.8	1.4	4,138	31.9	21.4	12.8	5.7	8.7	5.5	4.1	4.0	5.6	0.3
Tomelilla	28.9	0.9	2,714	25.2	19.8	11.9	9.0	6.1	15.6	4.5	3.6	3.7	0.4
Trelleborg	29.9	2.9	8,609	34.2	21.2	12.7	6.5	6.9	6.6	4.3	3.4	4.0	0.1
Vellinge	41.2	3.2	9,561	14.9	47.6	12.6	2.4	11.4	3.2	2.2	3.4	2.1	0.2
Ystad	33.9	2.4	6,976	29.7	26.4	12.6	6.6	8.3	7.2	4.1	2.8	2.2	0.0
Åstorp	26.4	0.8	2,445	32.5	22.1	12.2	7.9	5.4	7.3	3.3	4.9	3.9	0.5
Ängelholm	34.3	3.3	9,753	18.1	33.3	14.3	7.5	7.9	6.4	5.3	5.1	1.9	0.3
Örkelljunga	29.5	0.7	2,012	21.8	21.4	13.5	5.3	6.2	8.5	3.2	15.9	3.1	1.0
Östra Göinge	30.1	1.0	3,029	32.5	16.2	8.7	11.0	6.1	10.3	5.4	6.4	2.9	0.5
Total	34.8	11.8	296,465	25.9	23.7	12.6	8.3	10.6	5.2	5.6	4.3	3.4	0.4
Source: val.se

=== Stockholm ===
Location	Turnout	Share	Votes	S	M	JL	V	FP	C	MP	KD	SD	Other
Botkyrka	34.2	2.9	16,401	30.3	15.4	15.4	11.6	9.3	1.8	6.9	7.2	0.9	1.2
Danderyd	56.4	2.2	12,367	6.1	51.9	11.9	2.5	16.1	1.9	3.0	6.1	0.2	0.1
Ekerö	42.7	1.2	6,921	14.7	28.1	18.6	7.0	12.9	4.0	7.6	6.3	0.6	0.3
Haninge	34.0	3.0	16,679	29.7	18.6	16.5	10.1	9.1	2.2	6.5	4.8	0.8	1.7
Huddinge	37.2	3.9	21,687	24.3	21.3	16.2	10.2	11.7	2.1	5.9	5.4	1.5	1.5
Järfälla	41.5	3.2	18,248	23.8	22.2	16.4	9.6	12.8	2.0	5.7	5.9	0.9	0.6
Lidingö	51.5	2.8	15,848	9.9	43.8	12.1	4.2	18.7	1.8	3.8	5.0	0.5	0.2
Nacka	44.3	4.3	24,130	17.0	32.2	14.9	8.1	14.6	1.6	5.8	4.8	0.5	0.5
Norrtälje	35.3	2.5	14,148	23.8	19.5	18.5	9.5	6.9	7.8	5.7	4.7	0.5	3.0
Nykvarn	34.2	0.3	1,906	26.1	19.3	18.3	9.9	8.1	5.2	6.3	4.4	0.9	1.6
Nynäshamn	35.1	1.1	6,231	28.2	18.2	17.8	10.9	6.9	4.3	7.1	3.9	1.3	1.5
Salem	42.5	0.7	4,035	20.4	23.4	18.2	8.6	12.5	2.7	6.2	6.4	0.8	0.8
Sigtuna	33.0	1.5	8,222	23.0	24.0	17.5	8.8	9.0	4.2	5.4	5.9	1.5	0.7
Sollentuna	44.6	3.3	18,408	17.0	29.7	15.3	7.4	14.9	2.6	5.5	6.5	0.5	0.6
Solna	42.1	3.4	19,178	19.3	26.3	15.0	10.6	14.8	1.9	6.6	4.6	0.6	0.4
Stockholm	43.9	44.9	252,484	19.1	25.7	12.2	12.8	15.0	1.8	7.7	4.2	0.8	0.7
Sundbyberg	36.2	1.6	9,262	23.5	22.2	13.6	13.4	12.3	1.8	7.3	4.3	1.1	0.6
Södertälje	35.6	3.5	19,408	25.0	15.9	14.3	10.6	8.0	4.0	8.0	11.5	0.7	1.9
Tyresö	41.0	2.0	11,178	23.6	24.4	15.9	10.2	11.4	2.0	5.9	4.6	0.8	1.1
Täby	48.6	3.8	21,243	11.5	41.1	14.0	4.3	16.7	2.1	3.5	5.7	0.6	0.5
Upplands-Bro	35.9	0.9	5,176	23.8	20.3	17.6	10.4	9.7	2.6	6.3	7.9	0.8	0.5
Upplands Väsby	35.3	1.6	9,225	24.4	22.4	16.3	9.7	10.7	2.4	6.1	5.8	0.7	1.5
Vallentuna	40.1	1.3	7,278	17.7	27.2	18.2	8.2	11.1	5.4	6.0	4.9	0.7	0.7
Vaxholm	44.5	0.5	3,046	14.1	30.5	21.5	8.3	12.3	2.3	6.3	4.2	0.1	0.4
Värmdö	44.1	1.7	9,730	19.3	26.7	20.4	9.3	9.7	3.2	6.5	3.9	0.6	0.3
Österåker	38.1	1.7	9,658	18.1	28.6	18.6	8.0	12.1	2.7	5.6	5.2	0.6	0.6
Total	41.7	22.4	562,097	19.8	26.3	14.2	10.6	13.5	2.3	6.7	5.1	0.8	0.8
Source: val.se

=== Södermanland ===
Location	Turnout	Share	Votes	S	M	JL	V	FP	C	MP	KD	SD	Other
Eskilstuna	34.7	32.7	22,706	34.7	15.8	11.9	11.0	8.1	4.9	7.7	4.5	0.8	0.6
Flen	37.7	6.6	4,549	32.4	15.8	12.9	12.6	5.5	9.2	6.3	4.3	0.2	0.7
Gnesta	37.8	3.9	2,736	26.2	16.6	15.0	10.4	6.1	12.3	9.1	3.6	0.1	0.5
Katrineholm	35.1	12.1	8,379	34.1	15.2	11.9	9.2	8.0	7.8	7.6	4.6	0.7	0.9
Nyköping	39.2	21.0	14,563	29.3	17.6	16.9	9.0	8.3	7.5	5.2	5.4	0.3	0.5
Oxelösund	34.4	4.2	2,929	37.0	13.1	16.7	14.2	6.0	3.8	5.3	3.2	0.3	0.3
Strängnäs	38.3	12.1	8,421	23.4	23.9	14.3	7.7	10.9	6.0	5.9	4.9	0.1	2.8
Trosa	37.9	4.1	2,857	24.1	24.1	16.7	8.5	8.3	6.0	5.5	5.8	0.2	0.8
Vingåker	34.0	3.2	2,254	33.2	14.8	13.0	9.3	4.8	10.5	8.7	4.3	0.4	1.2
Total	36.4	2.8	69,394	31.3	17.3	13.8	10.0	8.0	6.7	6.8	4.7	0.5	0.9
Source: val.se

=== Uppsala ===
Location	Turnout	Share	Votes	S	M	JL	V	FP	C	MP	KD	SD	Other
Enköping	33.1	10.5	9,225	24.4	22.4	14.9	8.2	6.0	14.0	5.2	4.2	0.6	0.2
Håbo	32.6	4.6	4,038	22.1	26.6	17.2	8.7	8.0	6.4	5.1	3.7	0.8	1.4
Knivsta	40.9	4.1	3,626	17.8	21.6	18.6	7.5	12.7	6.8	6.8	6.7	0.8	0.7
Tierp	32.8	5.6	4,903	33.6	8.5	17.0	10.5	5.5	14.0	5.5	4.2	1.0	0.2
Uppsala	43.3	66.5	58,269	19.9	17.6	14.5	12.1	13.9	5.0	8.9	7.0	0.7	0.4
Älvkarleby	35.6	2.7	2,376	38.7	7.5	19.1	15.0	5.0	3.7	5.1	2.0	2.9	1.1
Östhammar	32.5	6.0	5,251	27.0	14.6	20.3	10.2	5.6	12.5	5.1	4.0	0.4	0.5
Total	39.6	3.5	87,688	22.1	17.7	15.4	11.2	11.5	7.0	7.7	6.1	0.8	0.5
Source: val.se

=== Värmland ===
Location	Turnout	Share	Votes	S	M	JL	V	FP	C	MP	KD	SD	Other
Arvika	30.4	8.4	5,915	29.8	12.5	12.9	13.7	7.5	8.1	7.4	4.8	1.9	1.4
Eda	25.2	2.0	1,405	37.4	11.4	9.8	12.3	4.1	13.8	4.1	3.8	1.4	2.0
Filipstad	31.9	3.8	2,700	40.2	10.4	9.3	19.0	4.5	4.0	5.1	3.4	1.6	2.5
Forshaga	35.8	4.3	2,999	39.5	9.2	14.1	11.8	5.1	7.5	5.8	4.1	2.1	0.9
Grums	29.4	2.9	2,067	37.9	10.3	14.2	13.5	4.0	10.0	4.3	3.7	1.1	1.0
Hagfors	29.7	4.5	3,160	43.7	7.5	8.5	19.3	3.2	7.0	4.7	2.8	1.0	2.2
Hammarö	39.3	5.8	4,064	33.0	15.4	14.3	12.0	10.0	2.9	5.3	4.9	1.6	0.6
Karlstad	38.9	34.9	24,461	27.7	17.1	14.6	11.7	9.5	5.5	6.7	5.4	1.1	0.7
Kil	32.6	4.0	2,804	28.1	14.3	13.0	11.7	6.7	10.8	5.5	7.1	1.6	1.2
Kristinehamn	34.0	8.9	6,232	29.7	14.9	15.4	12.7	8.0	7.2	5.4	4.7	1.2	0.9
Munkfors	34.3	1.5	1,075	43.7	6.7	10.1	17.0	4.7	8.1	3.7	1.8	3.2	1.0
Storfors	34.5	1.7	1,179	38.5	11.1	10.8	17.0	4.2	8.8	4.5	2.8	1.3	1.1
Sunne	34.6	5.0	3,526	22.4	14.5	10.7	9.0	5.6	23.1	5.8	5.2	2.2	1.4
Säffle	30.7	5.3	3,740	21.3	15.9	16.1	8.6	7.3	15.1	5.5	5.4	1.7	3.1
Torsby	29.0	4.2	2,919	29.1	12.1	13.1	19.3	3.5	11.3	5.5	4.1	1.3	0.7
Årjäng	28.4	2.7	1,905	21.4	14.6	14.5	11.8	7.7	15.5	4.7	7.9	0.8	1.2
Total	34.1	2.8	70,151	30.3	14.2	13.5	12.9	7.4	8.3	5.9	4.9	1.4	1.2
Source: val.se

=== Västerbotten ===
Location	Turnout	Share	Votes	S	M	JL	V	FP	C	MP	KD	SD	Other
Bjurholm	36.0	0.9	735	20.7	11.4	7.6	25.3	10.9	13.1	1.8	7.5	0.4	1.4
Dorotea	32.4	1.0	802	27.6	3.7	10.5	41.1	5.4	7.0	1.0	1.9	0.1	1.7
Lycksele	37.1	4.5	3,598	20.1	5.5	7.6	44.4	5.6	4.8	2.2	8.7	0.4	0.7
Malå	32.9	1.1	879	26.7	6.6	5.0	44.8	6.0	4.2	1.6	3.8	0.0	1.3
Nordmaling	36.2	2.6	2,083	22.1	6.0	7.3	36.7	6.1	12.2	2.2	6.6	0.2	0.5
Norsjö	36.1	1.6	1,256	16.7	4.4	8.9	48.8	3.5	9.3	1.1	6.9	0.0	0.3
Robertsfors	40.3	2.7	2,145	17.1	5.4	9.2	34.5	4.1	20.7	1.7	6.7	0.0	0.5
Skellefteå	41.0	28.2	22,412	24.9	5.6	9.9	37.2	6.2	6.4	3.5	5.4	0.4	0.7
Sorsele	32.5	0.9	748	17.4	5.3	8.3	50.7	3.7	3.3	4.5	6.7	0.0	0.0
Storuman	36.5	2.4	1,897	16.5	7.6	13.8	43.8	3.8	4.3	2.3	7.4	0.5	0.1
Umeå	43.5	44.7	35,445	18.4	7.4	8.8	42.5	7.9	5.0	5.1	4.1	0.2	0.7
Vilhelmina	37.8	2.7	2,179	18.7	4.0	11.7	46.2	3.4	6.1	2.2	7.2	0.5	0.0
Vindeln	36.5	2.1	1,657	17.0	8.1	7.8	37.8	5.8	12.7	2.4	7.7	0.1	0.4
Vännäs	40.2	3.2	2,529	20.2	5.3	4.5	44.7	4.2	11.7	3.0	5.8	0.1	0.4
Åsele	37.7	1.3	996	23.8	4.9	10.8	39.6	3.3	10.3	1.5	5.3	0.4	0.0
Total	40.8	3.2	79,361	20.6	6.4	9.1	40.8	6.6	6.6	3.9	5.2	0.2	0.7
Source: val.se

=== Västernorrland ===
Location	Turnout	Share	Votes	S	M	JL	V	FP	C	MP	KD	SD	EU-M	Other
Härnösand	38.5	11.4	7,416	28.9	11.2	15.0	14.3	6.2	8.1	9.7	4.6	0.6	0.8	0.7
Kramfors	35.5	8.8	5,678	35.2	7.5	13.5	16.4	2.8	12.7	5.5	3.6	0.7	2.2	0.1
Sollefteå	33.5	8.5	5,508	32.5	8.1	19.3	16.4	3.3	8.8	5.8	3.7	0.4	1.6	0.2
Sundsvall	34.6	38.1	24,690	26.3	11.6	16.2	15.1	8.3	5.4	6.6	4.4	1.3	4.6	0.4
Timrå	31.5	6.5	4,183	33.5	6.2	16.2	19.2	4.3	6.1	5.5	3.7	1.2	3.6	0.5
Ånge	31.9	4.1	2,685	30.6	5.2	12.6	14.3	2.3	7.9	4.2	2.4	1.2	19.2	0.1
Örnsköldsvik	35.2	22.6	14,682	33.0	7.7	15.0	13.3	4.8	11.1	5.2	8.6	0.1	0.9	0.1
Total	34.8	2.6	64,842	30.0	9.4	15.7	15.0	5.9	8.1	6.3	5.1	0.8	3.4	0.3
Source: val.se

=== Västmanland ===
Location	Turnout	Share	Votes	S	M	JL	V	FP	C	MP	KD	SD	Other
Arboga	36.3	5.6	3,669	29.2	14.6	20.6	10.8	6.5	7.3	5.6	4.6	0.4	0.2
Fagersta	32.5	4.6	3,024	33.1	13.1	15.6	20.3	4.4	3.5	4.0	3.5	1.7	0.8
Hallstahammar	34.0	5.5	3,605	37.7	10.3	15.6	13.8	5.9	5.4	4.9	5.3	0.6	0.5
Heby	32.7	5.0	3,256	22.4	9.1	18.7	13.1	4.7	19.4	4.8	6.3	1.1	0.4
Kungsör	35.9	3.3	2,151	26.7	13.7	18.3	11.1	5.8	15.1	4.9	4.3	0.0	0.1
Köping	33.1	9.2	5,996	30.4	13.7	17.5	14.4	5.6	8.5	3.7	5.2	0.3	0.8
Norberg	33.2	2.2	1,464	31.0	10.9	19.1	22.0	3.9	5.4	5.7	1.6	0.2	0.2
Sala	37.2	9.1	5,962	23.6	13.1	18.6	12.4	5.5	15.0	6.0	4.9	0.4	0.6
Skinnskatteberg	34.0	1.8	1,206	31.8	8.9	16.7	22.8	3.8	7.9	4.2	2.6	1.0	0.3
Surahammar	32.5	3.6	2,325	41.2	9.2	13.7	16.1	5.8	4.3	5.0	3.6	0.6	0.5
Västerås	38.0	55.1	36,088	27.2	18.7	15.5	9.9	11.0	3.8	6.5	6.1	0.5	0.8
Total	36.1	2.7	68,746	28.5	15.6	16.5	12.1	8.3	6.6	5.7	5.4	0.6	0.7
Source: val.se

=== Västra Götaland ===
Location	Turnout	Share	Votes	S	M	JL	V	FP	C	MP	KD	SD	Other
Ale	36.6	1.5	6,706	28.1	11.3	14.4	18.4	9.2	5.6	5.4	6.0	0.8	0.7
Alingsås	42.1	2.6	11,089	19.6	15.0	13.1	15.3	12.4	5.1	8.4	9.9	0.6	0.4
Bengtsfors	31.6	0.6	2,485	25.7	10.3	25.9	11.8	5.1	7.4	4.7	7.4	0.2	1.6
Bollebygd	39.1	0.5	2,259	21.5	18.0	15.9	16.9	8.6	7.0	3.8	7.2	0.4	0.7
Borås	36.9	6.2	26,731	25.5	15.9	16.1	12.1	10.3	4.8	5.1	6.7	0.9	2.4
Dals-Ed	29.6	0.2	1,057	20.1	9.1	26.3	11.2	4.4	12.2	4.1	9.7	0.2	2.7
Essunga	35.9	0.4	1,526	20.5	19.9	9.6	9.3	6.0	21.4	5.8	6.6	0.7	0.2
Falköping	36.7	1.9	8,412	24.5	15.9	12.5	11.0	5.7	13.6	5.3	9.6	1.2	0.7
Färgelanda	31.0	0.4	1,548	25.1	9.9	12.7	13.6	6.3	21.3	3.7	3.9	2.8	0.6
Gothenburg	40.4	33.5	145,078	20.8	18.1	12.0	15.6	16.6	1.7	8.0	5.0	1.2	0.9
Grästorp	34.5	0.3	1,506	17.5	22.9	15.3	8.3	5.4	21.0	2.8	5.6	0.5	0.7
Gullspång	37.1	0.4	1,553	25.6	11.6	20.5	14.2	4.9	10.5	4.8	5.3	2.4	0.1
Götene	38.7	0.9	3,699	26.2	12.3	13.7	11.1	5.6	11.0	5.5	13.7	0.6	0.3
Herrljunga	38.1	0.6	2,637	18.7	12.6	15.4	10.8	8.7	18.4	5.6	9.0	0.3	0.5
Hjo	38.9	0.6	2,581	25.0	18.9	13.8	10.6	7.4	8.8	5.6	9.3	0.5	0.0
Härryda	42.2	2.1	9,214	20.8	17.6	16.6	12.0	16.6	3.1	6.9	5.1	0.6	0.7
Karlsborg	36.3	0.4	1,929	29.8	15.1	17.1	9.0	6.5	11.4	4.6	5.9	0.4	0.3
Kungälv	49.1	3.1	13,469	24.2	15.4	15.5	12.7	11.8	7.1	5.5	6.1	0.6	0.9
Lerum	44.0	2.6	11,116	20.0	18.3	14.4	13.1	15.8	3.2	7.1	6.7	1.0	0.3
Lidköping	37.7	2.4	10,482	27.3	15.6	13.2	14.1	6.8	8.9	4.9	8.3	0.5	0.3
Lilla Edet	32.1	0.7	2,945	29.5	8.8	14.5	17.9	6.6	9.4	5.4	3.8	1.2	2.9
Lysekil	34.0	0.9	3,816	32.8	12.3	17.9	12.6	11.0	3.7	5.4	3.4	0.7	0.3
Mariestad	35.8	1.5	6,373	27.1	15.4	16.1	15.2	7.5	5.9	5.5	6.5	0.5	0.2
Mark	38.0	2.1	9,210	28.2	11.7	16.8	11.7	6.8	11.5	5.4	6.2	0.8	0.9
Mellerud	32.6	0.5	2,334	21.4	13.2	15.8	12.3	4.5	18.2	5.7	7.0	0.9	1.0
Munkedal	30.0	0.5	2,311	24.9	12.4	19.0	12.0	5.7	14.5	5.2	4.0	2.0	0.3
Mölndal	42.6	4.1	17,797	20.9	16.4	14.5	13.0	17.6	2.6	6.5	6.2	1.6	0.7
Orust	37.8	1.0	4,295	22.2	14.4	16.8	14.3	10.8	8.9	6.1	4.2	1.7	0.5
Partille	48.6	2.6	11,256	22.3	16.8	14.1	13.5	16.9	1.7	7.1	6.2	1.2	0.2
Skara	36.4	1.2	4,992	26.7	17.8	13.5	9.7	8.9	10.8	5.0	6.4	0.7	0.5
Skövde	36.3	3.1	13,467	27.1	17.1	14.8	10.6	9.0	8.2	4.6	7.7	0.8	0.2
Sotenäs	33.7	0.6	2,433	28.1	17.7	17.7	9.2	12.1	4.6	4.1	5.6	0.5	0.3
Stenungsund	38.8	1.4	6,220	25.5	16.2	13.5	12.7	13.1	5.2	6.3	5.9	0.7	0.9
Strömstad	28.4	0.5	2,217	23.0	15.6	13.4	12.2	11.5	11.8	7.0	4.6	0.2	0.8
Svenljunga	33.0	0.6	2,518	23.1	16.3	17.1	8.3	5.9	17.5	4.0	5.2	0.3	2.4
Tanum	30.9	0.6	2,808	18.5	16.6	17.4	11.3	9.7	16.2	5.9	3.8	0.1	0.5
Tibro	33.7	0.6	2,649	29.8	11.4	13.7	10.0	8.0	10.6	3.9	12.0	0.5	0.1
Tidaholm	35.5	0.8	3,251	33.4	11.4	15.1	13.0	5.4	9.1	4.3	7.2	0.6	0.6
Tjörn	39.1	1.0	4,397	21.4	16.2	16.8	9.0	14.5	4.5	5.2	10.3	2.0	0.2
Tranemo	39.4	0.8	3,425	29.6	13.2	15.9	7.2	6.1	18.0	3.9	5.0	0.6	0.5
Trollhättan	36.1	3.2	13,851	33.8	12.3	12.6	13.7	8.6	4.8	5.7	5.0	1.4	2.1
Töreboda	32.2	0.5	2,254	22.0	14.8	17.5	11.2	5.3	17.1	4.8	5.9	1.0	0.4
Uddevalla	34.7	2.9	12,712	26.6	13.2	16.7	14.3	9.3	5.4	5.5	6.4	1.8	0.8
Ulricehamn	38.7	1.5	6,435	19.6	14.6	18.4	9.5	8.6	15.3	5.0	8.2	0.4	0.4
Vara	36.3	1.0	4,336	22.1	22.3	12.2	9.0	5.5	17.2	3.9	6.8	0.2	0.8
Vårgårda	40.0	0.7	3,051	15.8	10.0	14.3	9.5	8.3	15.2	9.4	17.0	0.3	0.2
Vänersborg	38.4	2.4	10,492	25.1	12.6	13.3	17.1	8.1	8.5	5.3	6.3	0.7	3.0
Åmål	30.5	0.7	2,882	27.2	12.2	17.3	14.3	7.0	8.6	5.0	6.3	0.1	1.9
Öckerö	38.4	0.8	3,393	19.9	17.2	11.8	11.4	12.9	1.2	5.3	19.5	0.3	0.6
Total	38.7	17.2	433,197	23.4	16.1	14.1	13.7	12.4	5.7	6.4	6.3	1.0	0.9
Source: val.se

=== Örebro ===
Location	Turnout	Share	Votes	S	M	JL	V	FP	C	MP	KD	SD	Other
Askersund	35.6	4.0	3,114	30.1	13.3	16.2	10.0	5.5	10.1	4.4	8.7	1.7	0.1
Degerfors	34.1	3.3	2,595	43.2	6.3	16.6	17.3	3.3	4.7	3.3	4.3	0.7	0.5
Hallsberg	38.3	5.6	4,356	38.1	9.5	16.1	10.3	4.1	8.5	4.2	6.7	2.1	0.4
Hällefors	31.9	2.4	1,860	41.0	9.3	17.1	16.8	4.1	4.6	3.5	2.5	0.5	0.5
Karlskoga	33.3	9.9	7,721	34.7	14.7	20.3	11.7	6.2	2.8	3.7	4.2	1.0	0.7
Kumla	37.1	6.6	5,189	34.4	10.5	15.4	10.2	5.9	7.4	4.7	9.6	1.4	0.5
Laxå	34.4	2.1	1,615	36.7	9.0	14.9	13.9	4.9	5.4	3.7	8.7	2.4	0.4
Lekeberg	37.2	2.5	1,972	21.7	11.8	19.9	8.7	4.8	15.7	4.7	9.7	2.0	1.0
Lindesberg	35.5	7.9	6,146	30.2	11.7	20.2	10.2	5.1	10.4	5.5	4.5	1.2	1.0
Ljusnarsberg	32.0	1.7	1,310	36.0	9.2	18.3	14.7	3.3	7.5	3.8	3.7	2.6	1.0
Nora	38.4	3.8	3,006	31.4	11.7	21.9	11.3	6.0	6.3	5.1	4.8	1.2	0.3
Örebro	42.0	50.2	39,254	29.1	13.8	16.5	10.9	8.9	4.0	6.3	8.9	1.2	0.3
Total	38.4	3.1	78,138	31.6	12.6	17.4	11.2	7.0	5.6	5.3	7.5	1.3	0.5
Source: val.se

=== Östergötland ===
Location	Turnout	Share	Votes	S	M	JL	V	FP	C	MP	KD	SD	Other
Boxholm	33.1	1.0	1,287	33.0	8.2	15.9	12.3	3.3	15.9	4.0	6.7	0.9	0.0
Finspång	40.2	5.0	6,285	37.5	10.5	13.6	11.6	4.6	9.8	5.1	6.3	0.8	0.1
Kinda	35.8	2.1	2,622	21.4	15.0	13.3	10.7	4.7	20.4	5.9	7.2	0.5	0.8
Linköping	41.3	33.5	42,177	21.9	17.9	15.0	10.5	11.6	7.7	7.0	6.9	0.6	0.8
Mjölby	35.2	5.2	6,575	27.6	15.3	16.9	10.8	5.4	12.9	4.5	5.9	0.3	0.3
Motala	33.0	8.0	10,105	29.0	15.0	17.0	11.4	6.8	8.3	5.6	5.4	0.3	1.0
Norrköping	49.0	34.2	43,125	30.1	16.6	17.7	9.4	5.4	8.3	6.2	4.7	0.8	0.8
Söderköping	37.8	3.1	3,908	21.4	18.8	18.2	7.3	4.9	18.8	5.8	4.1	0.3	0.4
Vadstena	38.0	1.7	2,178	23.9	24.0	15.0	8.8	5.1	10.0	5.4	6.2	1.5	0.1
Valdemarsvik	33.9	1.7	2,143	23.3	13.2	12.3	7.2	2.9	34.1	3.5	3.0	0.2	0.3
Ydre	39.9	0.9	1,156	18.8	12.0	12.2	5.9	6.9	23.5	6.5	13.3	0.2	0.7
Åtvidaberg	34.3	2.3	2,943	30.8	11.9	14.6	10.5	4.8	16.7	5.0	5.0	0.2	0.4
Ödeshög	37.0	1.2	1,503	21.3	16.2	14.1	6.5	3.7	19.4	6.4	11.9	0.3	0.2
Total	41.5	5.0	126,007	26.7	16.4	16.1	10.0	7.4	10.0	6.2	5.9	0.6	0.7
Source: val.se
