= Political positions of Libertas =

The political positions of Libertas were the political positions of members or affiliates of Libertas, the umbrella title given to a constellation of organizations associated with Declan Ganley. Candidates and parties underneath its pan-European arm, Libertas.eu contended the 2009 European Parliament elections.

== Preamble ==
Libertas is a political party founded by Declan Ganley that took part in the 2009 European Parliament election in several member states of the European Union. For the purposes of contending those elections, Libertas candidates ran under lists (the lists of candidates presented to voters in a European election) branded with the Libertas identity, as exemplified by the French approach. Each list was made up of some combination of the following:

- members of member parties (member parties usually had names in the Libertas X format e.g. "Libertas Sweden")
- members of affiliate parties (parties that were not members of Libertas.eu but cooperate with it electorally)
- individual members (people who chose to join Libertas.eu as individuals. Candidates that ran under Libertas lists but who had no national party membership were automatically individual members).

Their political positions were as follows:

== EUProfiler ==
The EUProfiler was produced by a consortium of three institutions (Robert Schuman Centre for Advanced Studies, Kieskompas and the University of Zurich) analysing parties taking part in the 2009 elections. Some of those parties were Libertas. A summary of their analyses is given below.

=== Hix-Lord diagram ===
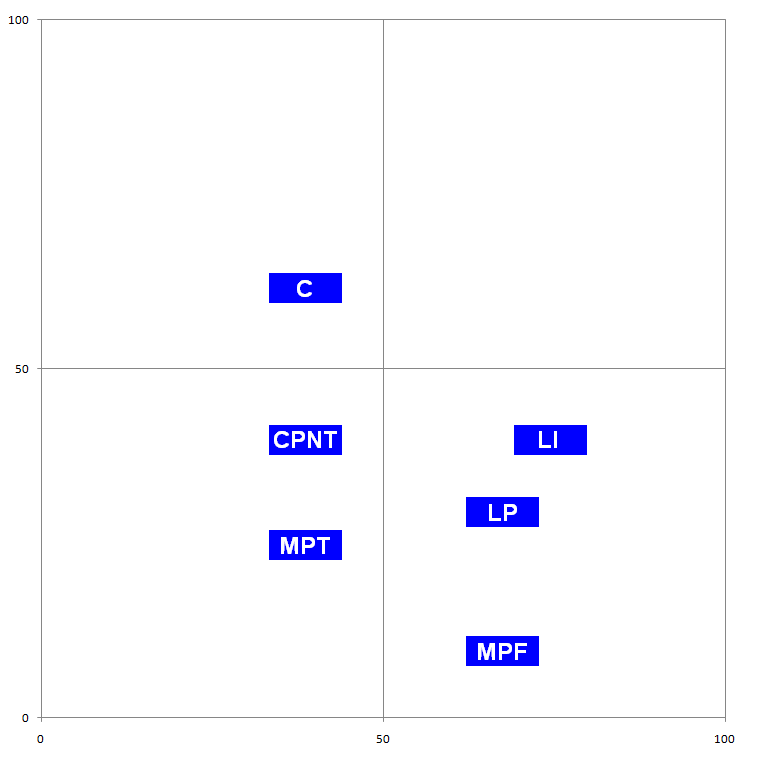
Six Libertas party positions at 29 May 2009 (see description for sources).

The EUProfiler gave the positions of political parties on the left-right and Eurosceptic spectra. Six of those parties were Libertas parties. They were as follows:

- Libertas Ireland (LI), Libertas's member party in Ireland
- Mouvement pour la France (MPF), a Libertas affiliate in France
- Chasse, Peche, Nature, Traditions (CPNT), a Libertas affiliate in France
- Libertas Poland (LP), Libertas's member party in Poland (Note: "Libertas Poland" here refers to the party of that name in Poland, not to the Libertas list of the same name, a coalition of Libertas Poland with NP, PSL Piast, PR, LPF candidates)
- Partido da Terra (MPT), a Libertas affiliate in Portugal
- Ciudadanos-Partido de la Ciudadanía (C), a Libertas affiliate in Spain

Those positions are summarized on the Hix-Lord diagram (a type of political compass) on the right. The Eurosceptic parties are towards the bottom, Europhile parties towards the top, the left-wing parties are towards the left, and right-wing parties towards the right.

=== Profile ===
The EUProfiler also collated party statements into their positions on distinct questions. A summary of those collations for the six Libertas parties analysed is as follows:

Category	Question	LI	CPNT	MPF	LP	MPT	C
Finances and taxes	The EU should acquire its own tax raising powers	Completely disagree	Tend to disagree	Completely disagree	Completely disagree	Tend to disagree	Completely disagree
Economy and work	The EU should drastically reduce its subsidies to Europe's farmers	Tend to disagree	Completely disagree	Completely disagree	Completely disagree	Completely disagree	Tend to agree
European integration	The European Union should be enlarged to include Turkey	Completely disagree	Completely disagree	Completely disagree	Completely disagree	No opinion	No opinion
Society, religion and culture	Euthanasia should be legalised	Completely disagree	No opinion	Completely disagree	Completely disagree	Completely disagree	Tend to agree
European integration	Individual member states of the EU should have less veto power	Completely disagree	Completely disagree	Completely disagree	Completely disagree	No opinion	Tend to agree
Society, religion and culture	The legalisation of same sex marriages is a good thing	Completely disagree	No opinion	Completely disagree	Completely disagree	No opinion	Tend to agree
Welfare, family and health	Greater efforts should be made to privatise healthcare services in your member state	No opinion	Tend to disagree	No opinion	Neutral	Tend to disagree	Completely disagree
Migration and immigration	Immigration policies oriented towards skilled workers should be encouraged as a means of fostering economic growth	Tend to disagree	No opinion	Completely disagree	Completely disagree	Neutral	Tend to agree
Foreign policy	On foreign policy issues, such as the relationship with Russia, the EU should speak with one voice	Neutral	No opinion	Completely disagree	Tend to disagree	Tend to disagree	No opinion
Society, religion and culture	The decriminalisation of the personal use of soft drugs is to be welcomed	No opinion	No opinion	No opinion	Completely disagree	Completely disagree	Tend to agree
Finances and taxes	Governments should bail out failing banks with public money	No opinion	Tend to disagree	Completely agree	Completely disagree	No opinion	Tend to disagree
European integration	European integration is a good thing	Tend to agree	Completely disagree	Completely disagree	Neutral	No opinion	Tend to agree
Environment, transport and energy	The promotion of public transport should be fostered through green taxes (e.g. road taxing)	No opinion	Completely disagree	No opinion	No opinion	Tend to agree	Neutral
Law and order	Restrictions of civil liberties should be accepted in the fight against terrorism	No opinion	No opinion	No opinion	No opinion	No opinion	Tend to disagree
Foreign policy	The European Union should strengthen its security and defence policy	No opinion	No opinion	Neutral	No opinion	Tend to disagree	No opinion
Finances and taxes	Government spending should be reduced in order to lower taxes	No opinion	No opinion	Completely agree	No opinion	Tend to disagree	Tend to disagree
Economy and work	Governments should reduce workers' protection regulations in order to fight unemployment	No opinion	No opinion	No opinion	No opinion	No opinion	Neutral
Environment, transport and energy	Policies to fight global warming should be encouraged even if it hampers economic growth or employment	No opinion	Tend to agree	No opinion	Completely disagree	Tend to agree	Neutral
Environment, transport and energy	Renewable sources of energy (e.g. solar or wind energy) should be supported even if this means higher energy costs	No opinion	Tend to disagree	Tend to agree	Completely disagree	Completely agree	Tend to agree
European integration	Your member state is much better off in the EU than outside it	Tend to agree	Tend to agree	Completely disagree	Tend to disagree	No opinion	Completely agree
Welfare, family and health	Social programmes should be maintained even at the cost of higher taxes	No opinion	Tend to agree	Completely disagree	Neutral	Completely agree	Tend to agree
Society, religion and culture	Religious values and principles should be shown greater respect in politics	Completely agree	Tend to disagree	Tend to agree	Completely agree	No opinion	Completely disagree
European integration	The European Parliament should be given more powers	Tend to agree	Completely agree	No opinion	Tend to agree	Tend to disagree	Neutral
Law and order	Criminals should be punished more severely	No opinion	Neutral	Completely agree	Completely agree	No opinion	Tend to agree
Migration and immigration	Immigrants from outside Europe should be required to accept our culture and values	Tend to agree	No opinion	Completely agree	Completely agree	No opinion	Tend to agree
Welfare, family and health	State subsidies for crèches and child care should be increased substantially	No opinion	Completely agree	Tend to agree	Completely agree	Tend to agree	Completely agree
Migration and immigration	Immigration into your member state should be made more restrictive	Completely agree	Completely agree	Completely agree	Tend to agree	Neutral	Tend to agree
European integration	Any new European Treaty should be subject to approval in a referendum in your member state	Completely agree	Completely agree	Completely agree	Completely agree	Completely agree	Completely agree
Sources							

== CPDS ==
The University of Bern Institute for Political Science (Universität Bern, Institut für Politikwissenschaft) maintains comparative political datasets CPDS I, II and III classifying political parties from the OECD and EU into distinct political families. Two of those parties were Libertas parties. The CPDS characterized those parties as follows:

Libertas member/affiliate	Political family	Sources
League of Polish Families	Religious	
Komma Fileftheron	Liberal	

== Human rights monitors ==
The Anti-Defamation League, United Nations, and Council of Europe monitor parties for use of racist, xenophobic and/or anti-Semitic discourse. Two of those parties were Libertas parties. They are as follows:

Libertas member/affiliate	Sources
League of Polish Families	
Mouvement pour la France	

== Left-right positions ==
The Oscarsson and Dahlberg paper "Mapping the European Party Space: Does Party System Simplicity produce Democratic Legitimacy?" characterized parties on the left-right spectrum. Three of those parties were Libertas parties. Oscarsson and Dahlberg characterized those parties as follows (data from 2004):

Libertas member/affiliate	Score (0=extreme left, 10=extreme right)	Sources
League of Polish Families	7.25	
Komma Fileftheron	6.27	
Mouvement pour la France	6.27	
