= Hélène Goudin =

Swedish politician

Hélène Goudin (born 25 November 1956 in Brussels) is a Swedish politician and former Member of the European Parliament for the June List; part of the Independence and Democracy group.

Goudin was vice chair of the ACP-EU Joint Parliamentary Assembly and co-president and treasurer of the EUDemocrats - Alliance for a Europe of Democracies.
