= Lave Knud Broch =

Danish politician

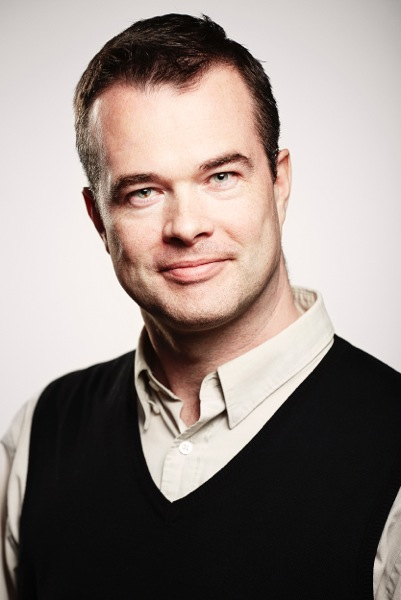

Vice President, EUDemocrats
- Incumbent
- Assumed office 2011

Personal details
- Born: 22 March 1972 (age 54) Malmö, Sweden
- Party: EUDemocrats, Danish Social Liberal Party, People's Movement against the EU
- Education: University of Copenhagen
- Website: http://broch.dk/

Lave Knud Broch is a Danish politician and Vice President of the European political alliance, EUDemocrats and substitute member to the European Parliament for the People's Movement against the EU. Broch is the chair of the Danish UN Association’s Peace and Conflict resolution committee and serves on the executive board. He is widely known in the Danish public for arguing that Denmark should not participate in military actions without a UN mandate. He strongly supports Danish participation in the UN's efforts to promote peace, including establishing a permanent UN peace force.

Broch has connections to a variety of Nordic countries, having grown up in a Danish-Norwegian family in Malmö, Sweden. Broch has a Master of Science degree in Political Science from University of Copenhagen. He is also a member of the Danish Social Liberal Party and was a European Parliament candidate for the first time in 1994.
