= Europeans United for Democracy =

Former Eurosceptic European political party

Europeans United for Democracy EUDemokraten – Allianz für ein Europa der Demokratien UEDémocrates – Alliance pour une Europe des Démocraties
- President: Patricia McKenna
- Founded: 8 November 2005
- Dissolved: 2017
- Headquarters: 113-115, rue du Trône/Troonlaan, B-1050 Brussels, Belgium
- Ideology: Confederalism; Decentralization; Euroscepticism; Eurorealism
- Political position: Centre-left to left-wing
- Colours: Orange; Delft blue

Website
- www.europeansunitedfordemocracy.org www.eudemocrats.org

Europeans United for Democracy – Alliance for a Europe of Democracies (EUD), formerly known as EUDemocrats, was a Eurosceptic and self-described Eurorealist European political party. It sought a radical decentralization or a complete abolition of the EU. It incorporated members from both the right and the left political spectrum; however, it was dominated by left-wing parties and represented ideologically left-wing faction of Euroscepticism. It functioned between 2005 and 2017.

The party was set up under Danish law on 7 November 2005 and founded as a European Party in Brussels on 8 November 2005. Its first congress was held on 24 February 2006. Former Danish MEPs Jens-Peter Bonde and Hanne Dahl inspired the EUD's creation and first years. In January 2009, Swedish economist and former MEP Sören Wibe succeeded Bonde as President of the EUD. Following Wibe's sudden death in December 2010, former Irish Green MEP Patricia McKenna was named president of the EUD and Lave Knud Broch from People's Movement against the EU as vice president.

The founding parties of the party included the Danish June Movement from Jens-Peter Bonde (who also became the first president of the party), the Self-Defence of the Republic of Poland, the June List from Sweden and the Danish People's Movement Against the EU. The party had to rely on the assistance of individual Members of Parliament in order to reach the representational threshold of seven member states — these members included Roger Helmer, UK Conservative Daniel Hannan, Igor Grazin from the Estonian Reform Party, Nicolas Dupont-Aignan from Arise the Republic, Sandor Leszak and Andras Ptiski from FIDESZ, Irish independent Kathy Sinnott, Klaus Buchner from the German Ecological Democratic Party and Iveta Grigule from the Latvian Farmers' Union. These parties and members came from all sides of the political spectrum and were united in their criticism of the EU, although in varying degrees.

Although the EUD's platform was not concerned with specific ideological matters, as it believed that such issues were best dealt with by national and regional parliaments under the democratic control of the people, the party itself was considered left-wing; David Hanley, head of the School of European Studies at Cardiff University, called it a "core statement of left-wing Euroscepticism". The EUD cooperated with other left-wing European parties. The party was committed to increasing transparency, subsidiarity, diversity and budgetary control in the European Union, wanting to limit the Union to a free-trade zone and a safeguard of social and environmentalist standards, with integration efforts being only optional and limited to the minimum. The EU was to be prohibited from dictating a common foreign, economic and security policy to all members, and elements of membership were to be elective, with member states able to choose to participate in the free-trade zone only, without partaking in other elements of the European Union.

In 2009, four of its affiliated MEPs were members of the Independence and Democracy group in the European Parliament. Also, two affiliated MEPs - Roger Helmer and Daniel Hannan, both British Conservatives - sat as independents. Hannan left EUD in October 2009 to join the newly formed Alliance of European Conservatives and Reformists, while Helmer defected from the British Conservatives to British party UKIP. From 2010 to 2014 EUD had one member in the European Parliament: Rina Ronja Kari (replaced Søren Søndergaard 5 February 2014), who sits as an associate member of the European United Left/Nordic Green Left Group. In the 2014 European Parliament elections two EUD members Rina Ronja Kari and Iveta Grigule were elected.

Ten members of national and regional parliaments from ten countries were also members of the EUD (as of 2014).

== Political platform ==
The political aim of the EUDemocrats was to reform the present structures of the European Union. According to its political platform, the EUD believed that decisions should be made at the lowest possible level (subsidiarity), thus giving an effective voice to the citizens of member states, regions and national minorities. It aimed to unite those who are critical of the EU for its undemocratic development and its ever-more centralising political features. The EUDemocrats wished to transform the European Union into a "free alliance among the nations of Europe", where countries were free to determine their level of integration and change it at will, as well as "safeguarding local democracy and pushing for decision making at the lowest possible levels."

The EUD opposed the centralisation of political power in the EU institutions, and demanded democratic oversight and control of EU institutional powers and actions by national and regional assemblies. The party believed that European integration must be stopped as it would transform Europe into a centralised unitary state, arguing that while the initial impulse for integration were perceived economic benefits, the drive for integration also spilled over into political and sociocultural consequences. The EUD criticized Europe's mainstream parties for passively going along with the integration, often in an undemocratic or misleading fashion. The party described the progressing European integration as the result of the "permissive consensus of furtive elites [that] has once again pulled the wool over citizens’ eyes"." The party staunchly opposed centralizing tendencies within the EU, and proposed a radical and far-reaching decentralization that would prioritize safeguarding sovereignty of the EU members, and make integration strictly optional and reversible.

The party's solution was to restore the principle of subsidiarity and regionalization in the union, stating that too the European Union had been given too much power that must now be "clawed back". The party's alternative was called "flexible integration", which would enable member states to use EU cooperation procedures only when all parties concerned wished to, without forcing any common policy on all members. The only issues to be decided at EU level were to be "truly cross-border issues", which the EUD classified as guaranteeing four fundamental freedoms (persons, goods, property and capital) and environmental policy.

The policy areas that the party wanted to exclude from EU competence were common trade policy, criminal justice, education and cultural policy. The party also wanted to abolish the Common Foreign and Security Policy, arguing that the EU should not be able to dictate a uniform foreign and security policy for its member states. According to the EUDemocrats, the EU was to simply guarantee "a set of minimum standards in security, health, workplace protection and environment" instead. It also proposed to replace the European Constitution with a cooperation agreement between states, with the possibility for a member state to only choose a basic free-trade agreement without participating in other EU components. In regards to the electoral system of the EU, the party sought to make European Commissioners be elected by national electorates.

Its four political core objectives were:

- enhancing transparency on all political levels, especially in the EU by giving citizens insight into all documents and meetings;
- strengthen real subsidiarity in the EU thus taking decisions at the lowest political level possible;
- improving democracy and accountability by reforming EU institutions and structures making them function more democratically;
- defending diversity in the EU by making it possible for member states to implement politics according to their national reality and by promoting flexible cooperation instead of fixed harmonisation.

The operational aim of EUD was to act as an effective political platform and campaigning organisation which is able to influence pan-European politics towards extending democratic structures in the EU. The EUD also sought to have candidates elected in European elections that shared its core Eurorealist political ideas and thus influence politics in the European Parliament itself.

The position of the party was described as a "minimalist Eurorealist position", as the EUD believed that while preferably the EU would not exist, some form of minimal integration had now become avoidable, but it should be constrained as much as possible. The EU was to be a free-trade zone with few, minimal supranational competences and minimized bureaucracy.

The party was critical of the Lisbon Treaty and believed that many elements of it were breaching the political independence of the member states. It deeply opposed common defence and intelligence projects such as the European Union Foreign Service and European army, arguing that such projects "will undermine the member states foreign, security and defence policy".

Despite the diverse nature of its founding parties, the EUD was seen as a "core statement of left-wing Euroscepticism", as its platform incorporated strongly left-wing concerns about the EU, including concerns about parliamentary control and distrust of the EU's military role, combined with an emphasis on the need to ensure environmental and social standards. The EUD cooperated with and was ideologically close to other left-wing Eurosceptic EU parties, such as the Nordic Green Left Alliance and the Party of the European Left.

== Campaigns ==
In March 2011, the EUDemocrats launched a campaign against the idea of direct-tax income for the European Union (including a tax on citizens, the banking sector, or the air traffic sector. The campaign was launched as www.noeutax.com.

In an effort to bring balance to the euro debate in the Baltics, EUDemocrats has started a Latvian web information campaign at www.parlatu.lv.

== Membership ==
=== Member parties ===
Country	Party	Abbr.
Denmark	June Movement (JuniBevægelsen)	J
Denmark	People's Movement against the EU (Folkebevægelsen mod EU)	N
France	Citizen and Republican Movement (Mouvement républicain et citoyen)	MRC
Italy	Italian Animalist Party (Partito Animalista Italiano)	PAI
Latvia	Eurosceptic Action Party (Eiroskeptiķu Rīcības Partija)	ERP
Latvia	The New Democrats (Jaunie Demokrāti)	JD
Poland	Self-Defence of the Republic of Poland (Samoobrona Rzeczpospolitej Polskiej)	SRP
Portugal	New Democracy Party (Partido da Nova Democracia)	PND
Romania	National Initiative Party (Partidul Inițiativa Națională)	PIN
Romania	People's Party – Dan Diaconescu (Partidul Poporului – Dan Diaconescu)	PP-DD
Slovakia	Agrarian and Countryside Party (Agrárna strana vidieka)	ASV
Sweden	June List (Junilistan)	JL

=== Parties with individual members ===
Country	Party	Abbr.
Åland	Non-aligned Coalition (Obunden Samling)	ObS
Belgium	For Individual Freedom and Labour in a New Future (Voor Individuele Vrijheid en Arbeid in een Nieuwe Toekomst)	Vivant
Estonia	Estonian Reform Party (Eesti Reformierakond)	ER
France	Arise the Republic (Debout la République)	DLR
Germany	Ecological Democratic Party (Ökologisch-Demokratische Partei)	ÖDP
Hungary	Fidesz – Hungarian Civic Alliance (Fidesz – Magyar Polgári Szövetség)	Fidesz
Latvia	Latvian Farmers' Union (Latvijas Zemnieku savienība)	LZS
United Kingdom	Conservative and Unionist Party	Tories
United Kingdom	Green Party of England and Wales	GPEW

=== Individual members, NGOs, and observers ===
Åland:

- Danne Sundman, Non-aligned Coalition (Obunden Samling)

Belgium:

- Michael Balter, Vivant group leader at the Parliament of the Deutschsprachige Gemeinschaft Belgiens

Estonia:

- MP Igor Gräzin, Estonian Reform Party (Eesti Reformierakond)

France:

- MP Nicolas Dupont-Aignan, Arise the Republic (Debout la République)

Germany:

- MP Klaus Buchner, Ecological Democratic Party (Ökologisch-Demokratische Partei)

Ireland:

- National Platform
- People's Movement (Gluaiseacht an Phobail)
- Independent TD Thomas Pringle
- Independent ID Kathy Sinnott

Hungary:

- MP Sandor Leszak, Fidesz – Hungarian Civic Alliance (Fidesz – Magyar Polgári Szövetség)
- MP Andras Ptiski, Fidesz – Hungarian Civic Alliance (Fidesz – Magyar Polgári Szövetség)

Italy:

- Euro Sceptics - Animal Environmentalist Party (Euro Scettici - Partito Animalista Ambientalista)

Latvia:

- MP Iveta Grigule-Pēterse, Latvian Farmers' Union (Latvijas Zemnieku savienība)

Slovakia:

- Direct Democracy (Slovakia) (Priama Demokracia - Hnutie Domova)
- Rudolf Kusy, member of the regional parliament of Bratislava
- Peter Kopecký, Agrarian and Countryside Party (Agrárna strana vidieka)

Slovenia:

- June List (Junijska lista)
- EUDemocrats Slovenia (EUDS)
- Gorazd Drevensek

United Kingdom

- Jenny Jones, Baroness Jones of Moulsecoomb, Green Party
- MP Daniel Hannan, Conservative and Unionist Party
- MP Roger Helmer, Conservative and Unionist Party

== See also ==
- European political party
- Authority for European Political Parties and European Political Foundations
- European political foundation
