= Agrarian and Countryside Party =

Political party in Slovakia

Agrarian and Countryside Party Agrárna strana vidieka (Slovak)
- Abbreviation: ASV
- Leader: Jozef Vaškeba
- Founded: 26 April 2003
- Registered: 29 November 2003
- Headquarters: Toryská 46, 821 07 Bratislava
- Membership (2005): 500
- Ideology: Social democracy Agrarianism
- Political position: Left-wing
- European affiliation: EUDemocrats
- Colors: Green

Website
- asv-sr.sk

Agrarian Party of the Countryside (Slovak: Agrárna strana vidieka, ASV) is a left-wing agrarian political party in Slovakia.

== History ==
In 2005, a minor Slovak party, the Society of Slovak Personalities (Slovak: Spoločnosť osobností Slovenska, SOS) led by Marián Leinerovič joined the ASV ahead of the 2006 Slovak parliamentary election. Announcing the merger, the Agrarian and Countryside Party hoped to win between 5 and 7% of the popular vote. It states its intention to work with fellow "social-oriented" parties such as Direction – Social Democracy.

In 2009, the party ran for the 2009 European Parliament elections with an electoral list headed by Peter Kopecký. Kopecký, vice president of the EUDemocrats had previously unsuccessfully tried to found his own party under the label of the Paneuropeist alliance Libertas.eu. ASV received 0.45% of the votes.

In the 2009 Slovak regional elections in November, together with the Party of the Democratic Left, the Agrarian and Countryside Party supported the candidacy of the former minister of agriculture Miroslav Jureň for the chairman of Trnava Region. Jureň ran with the slogan "Healthy countryside and a healthy approach to regional politics".

In the 2010 Slovak parliamentary election, together with the Slovak Green Party and the Civic Solidarity Party, the Agrarian and Countryside Party reached an agreement with the social-democratic Party of the Democratic Left to run on its electoral lists. All four parties made a joint declaration, stating: "We are united by left-wing values and the belief that we can build a strong and socially better-functioning state that takes care of every person, not just politicians, their friends and the rich."

This joint list under the Party of the Democratic Left won 61,137 votes in total, which amounted to 2.42% of the popular vote. It was not enough to win a seat in the National Council.

The party continued to work together with the social democrats after the 2010 election. In 2011, the far-left party Dawn named the Agrarian and Countryside Party and the Union of the Workers of Slovakia as parties that it would be willing to share an electoral list with, representing those "hurt by the non-banking companies".

== Ideology ==
The Agrarian and Countryside Party defines itself as a civil alliance and a popular movement that wants to combat the underdevelopment and poverty in the Slovak countryside. According to the party, its main effort is to create conditions for reducing high unemployment, which deprives entire generations of people of life prospects and forces many to seek an often inferior livelihood abroad. It is considered a left-wing party, and it cooperates with other left-wing parties such as the Slovak Green Party, Party of the Democratic Left and the Civic Solidarity Party (Slovak: Strana občianskej solidarity).

The party described itself as socially-oriented, arguing that "today, a [common] citizen means nothing in the Slovak Republic". It stated its ideological closeness to social-democratic SMER. It proposes a "timeless model" for peacefully solving the problems of the Romani community in Slovakia - it called for a revitalization of Roma-majority municipalities, and noted that Romani regions are not given enough financial resources. The party also postulated the "unification of religions", and reconstruction of the Devín Castle, which was destroyed by the French forces in 1803. It follows the tradition of Slovak political agrarianism, which rejected the 'radical manifestations' of socialism as well as rejecting capitalism for its shortcomings in terms of equality.

The ASV stressed that there "is no richer Slovakia without a richer countryside", and argued that Slovakia has an unfair system of internal division of subsidies and state support, leading to continuing underdevelopment of poor regions and increasing inequality. The party pursued a fairer distribution of funds, and applied this principle to its European Parliament program, where it postulated a fairer common agricultural policy, as well as a fairer distribution of the EU funds amongst its member states. It stated the development and improving the quality of life in the poor and rural regions as its priority. The party also campaigned on some environmental issues, such as limiting felling of forests and halting the expansion of hunting grounds in Slovakia.
