= Nils Lundgren =

Swedish politician and economist (born 1936)

Nils Lundgren MEP
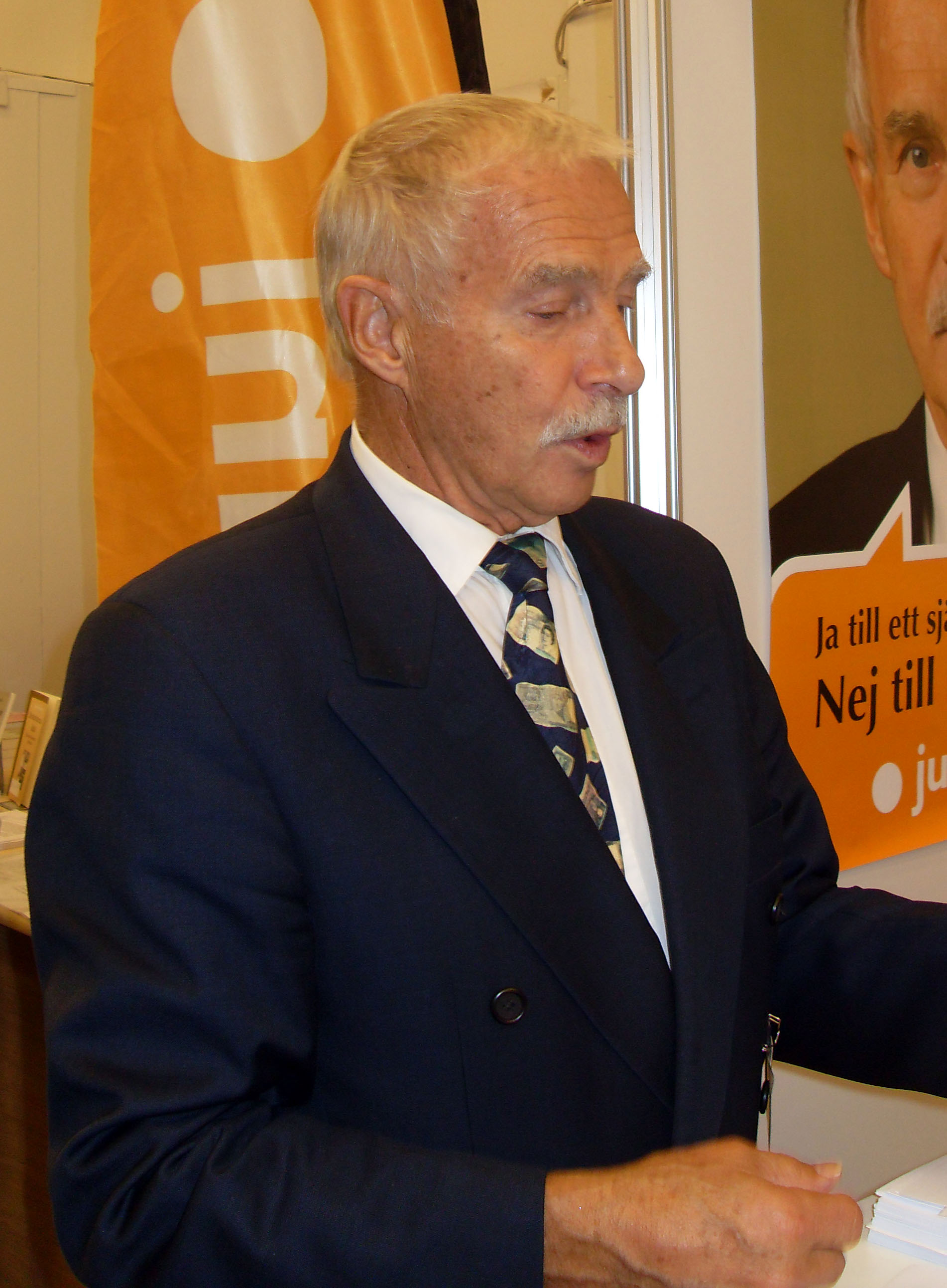

Member of the European Parliament for Sweden
- In office 2004–2009

Personal details
- Born: 13 July 1936 (age 90) Skövde, Sweden

Nils Gustav Herman Lundgren (born 13 July 1936) is a Swedish politician and economist, who is a former Member of the European Parliament (MEP). Between 2004 and 2008 he was the leader of the eurosceptical June List, which he had co-founded.

He was elected to the European Parliament in 2004 and was a member of the bureau of the Independence and Democracy group, and vice-chair of the European Parliament's Committee on Budgetary Control. He was also a member of the Committee on Industry, Research and Energy, a substitute for the Committee on Economic and Monetary Affairs, and a member of the delegation to the EU–Turkey Joint Parliamentary Committee. He did not stand for re-election as a MEP in the 2009 elections.

== Education ==
- Doctorate in economics from Stockholm University (1975)

== Career ==
- University lecturer in economics, Stockholm (1962–1963)
- Economics expert at EFTA secretariat in Geneva (1964–1965)
- Research at Institute for International Economic Studies, Stockholm (1966–1971)
- Researcher, Ministry of Industry (1971–1974)
- Guest researcher, Reading University (1975)
- Head of research unit, National Institute of Economic Research (1977–1979)
- Chief economist, PK-banken subsequently Nordbanken subsequently MeritaNordbanken (1980–1999)
- Economic adviser Nordea (1999–2001)
- Member of the Royal Swedish Academy of Engineering Sciences since 1988.
- Artillery reserve officer
- Previously chairman and member of the Board of a number of Swedish and international companies and organisations
- Editor-in-chief of Ekonomisk debatt
- Integration i Västeuropa (Integration in Western Europe) (1974), Industripolitikens spelregler (Industrial policy - the rules of the game) (1981) and Europa ja - euro nej (Yes to Europe - no to the euro) (2003), as well as a number of other books, publications and articles
