= Drude Dahlerup =

Danish politician (born 1945)

- Born: 3 February 1945 (age 81)

Academic background
- Education: Aarhus University, Denmark

Academic work
- Main interests: Gender studies and politics

Drude Dahlerup (born 3 February 1945) is a Danish-Swedish professor of Political Science at Stockholm University. Her main research area is gender and politics. She is an international consultant on the empowerment of women in politics and a specialist on the implementation of gender quota systems. Spokesperson for the EU-critical center-left June Movement during four Danish referendums in the 1990s.

== Education ==
Dahlerup graduated as a candidate of political science from Aarhus University in 1974.

== Academic career ==
Dahlerup was an associate professor of political science at Aarhus University, Denmark from 1989 and a full professor of political science with special focus on gender studies form 1998 at the Department of Political Science at Stockholm University, Sweden. Other appointments she has held include Visiting Researcher at Radcliffe College, Harvard University 1981–82; Visiting professor, Birkbeck College, University of London, 2002–03; Visiting professor at Faculty of Social Science, Radboud University, Nijmegen, 2013–14. Today, she works as professor emerita at Stockholm University and, since 2017, also as an honorary professor at Roskilde University, Dept. of Social Science and Business.

Dahlerup edited the first global overview over the widespread adoption of electoral gender quotas since the start of the 1990s: Women, Quotas and Politics, Routledge 2006. In cooperation with International IDEA and the Inter-Parliamentary Union. Dahlerup and her research team developed the global web site on the use of electoral gender quotas around the world, www.quotaproject.org. Dahlerup edited with Lenita Freidenvall the report “Electoral Gender Quota Systems and their Implementation in Europe”, requested by the European Parliament's Committee on Gender Equality, 2009, up-dated 2011 and 2013 (PE 408.309 and 493.011). In the article, “Quotas as a Fast Track to Equal Political Representation for Women: Why Scandinavia is No Longer the Model”, International Feminist Journal of Politics, 2005, 7 (1): 26–48.), Dahlerup and Lenita Freidenvall introduced the concepts of the’ Fast Track Model’ versus the ‘Incremental Track Model’ to women's political empowerment.

Dahlerup took an active part in the first development of Women's Studies, later Gender Studies in Denmark, in the Nordic countries as well as internationally. She was member of the board of KVINFO, The Danish Centre for Information on Women, Gender and Diversity, Copenhagen, 1998–2003; head of Cekvina, Centre for Gender Studies at Aarhus University, 1991–92 and again 1997. Member of the board of KVINFO, The Danish Center for Information on Women and Gender, Copenhagen, 1998–2003.

=== Political activism ===
Dahlerup was a co-founder of the Redstockings, the Women's Liberation Movement in Denmark, which started 1970. She has been active in various national and international feminist organizations.

In the 1990s, Dahlerup was one of the leading figures in the No-campaign in the Danish EU-referendums on the new EU-Treaties in 1992, 1993, 1998 and against the euro in 2000. She was co-founder and spokesperson for the center-left EU-critical JuneMovement (JuniBevægelsen), one of the leading EU-critical movements in Denmark, represented in the European Parliament 1993–2009.[1] Dahlerup was vice-chair of the Danish Government's Council for European Politics 1993–2000; Since 2006 chair of the Danish EU-critical think-thank NyAgenda.

=== Publications ===
Dahlerup has published works on women in politics, quota systems, the women's movements and feminist theory. In an article published in 1988, “From a Small to a Large Minority”, (Scandinavian Political Studies (11 (4):275-98), she applied the ‘critical mass theory’ known from nuclear physics to the minority position of women in politics. Among her edited books in English are The New Women’s Movement: Feminism and Political Power in Europe and the U.S.A (Sage 1986); Women, Quotas and Politics (Routledge 2006) and Breaking Male Dominance in old Democracies (with Monique Leyenaar, Oxford Univ. Press 2013). She wrote a two volume book, Rødstrømperne (the Redstockings), about the development, new thinking and impact of the Danish new Women's Liberation Movement, 1970-85 (in Danish, Gyldendal 1998). Her book Has Democracy Failed Women?, was also published in Danish (Demokrati uden kvinder?) and Korean. She contributed to the Routledge Handbook of Election Law.

=== Awards ===
- Dansk Kvindesamfunds Mathildepris 1990.
- The Gender and Politics Research Award, 2013.
- European Consortium for Political Research (ECPR).
