= June Movement =

June Movement JuniBevægelsen
- Leader: Collective leadership
- Founded: 1992
- Dissolved: 2009
- Headquarters: Nordkystvejen 2 F, 8961 Allingåbro
- Ideology: Euroscepticism; Decentralization
- Political position: Left-wing
- European affiliation: EUDemocrats
- European Parliament group: Independence/Democracy (2004-2009)
- Colours: Magic mint

The June Movement (Danish: JuniBevægelsen) was a Danish left Eurosceptic political organisation founded 23 August 1992. It took its name from the referendum on the Maastricht Treaty that took place in Denmark in June of that year. The movement was a member of the European political party EUDemocrats - Alliance for a Europe of Democracies.

The June Movement acknowledged Denmark's membership of the European Union, but opposed the process of tighter European integration including the Lisbon Treaty, and in general the movement wanted the EU to deal with only cross-border issues such as environmental and trade policies. The movement participated in elections for the European Parliament, but neither in local elections nor in elections for the Parliament of Denmark.

In 2009, the movement lost its representation in the European Parliament and disbanded on 5 September 2009.

== History ==
The June Movement was founded at a conference at Christiansborg on 23 August 1992. Its immediate predecessors were Danmark 92 and a group of members of People's Movement against the EU. The three original spokespersons were Drude Dahlerup and Niels I. Meyer (originally from the initiative Danmark 92) and Jens-Peter Bonde (originally from the People's Movement against the EU).

=== MEPs split from the People's Movement ===
At the end of 1992, three of the four representatives of the People's Movement in the European Parliament (Jens-Peter Bonde, Birgit Bjørnvig og Ulla Sandbæk) decided to represent the June Movement for the rest of the election term. Besides members of Danmark 92 and the People's Movement, the June Movement also attracted a significant number of members who previously had not been politically active and among established parties across the spectrum. The movement attracted activists from the now-defunct youth organization Unge Mod Unionen, including former candidates for the European Parliament and board members.

The movement recommended a 'no' vote at the EU referendums in 1993, 1998 and 2000.

=== 1999–2008 representation ===
Between 1999 and 2004, they held three of the sixteen Danish seats in the European Parliament. By the 2004 elections only one MEP, Jens-Peter Bonde, was re-elected.

The movement recommended rejecting the European constitution as it considered it to be undemocratic and as introducing too much central control. However, the European constitution was passed in the Danish Parliament without a referendum.

In May 2008, Jens-Peter Bonde resigned from the European Parliament, succeeded by Hanne Dahl. Bonde later stopped being a leading member of the June Movement, instead working as an adviser for the cross-European Libertas Party.

=== 2009 electoral defeat and dissolution ===
On 7 June 2009, the June Movement was convincingly defeated in the Danish elections for the European Parliament, and the movement lost its seat. To run again, the movement needed to collect signatures from 80,000 voters, which it considered an impossible task. On the evening of the election, movement leader Keld Albrecthsen announced that the movement would disband, which it did on 5 September 2009.

== Policies ==
The organisation claimed to be cross-spectrum and had active members from all political affiliations, however with emphasis on the centre-left. Its self-description notwithstanding, it was considered a left-wing party.

The June Movements did not want Denmark to leave the EU, but proposed a "slimmer and better EU". In general the movement wanted the EU to deal with only cross-border issues such as environmental and trade policies. Nature sustainability, human and animal health should have higher priority than capital movements and free market issues. The movement demanded transparency and control of the EU's use of money. It proposed a reversed form of the EU's principle of subsidiarity, meaning that it wanted the EU to handle issues only when ordered to do so by the member countries. The movement also wanted the EU to skip interference into areas which were covered by other international organisations, such as human rights, defence and security politics.

One proposal for democratic reform of the EU was to let the European commissioners be elected nationally, by the electorate. This was meant to offer more debate on EU legislation as well as to bring in more democracy to the EU.

The movement was strongly against the Lisbon Treaty, and former MEP Jens-Peter Bonde was known as an outspoken critic of the treaty in the European Parliament.

== Organisation ==
The organisation was run by a board, elected by participants of the annual general meeting. The board had to have a certain minimum membership of both genders. The last board included MEP Hanne Dahl as well as chairman Keld Albrechtsen among others.

=== Symbol ===
The symbol of the movement was the strawberry, which in Denmark is typically associated with summer and the month of June.

=== European relations ===
Traditionally, the June Movement had relations with political organisations proposing democratisation of the EU in most EU countries, as well as in non-member states. It had a Swedish sister party, the Junilistan, which also lost its seats in the European Parliament in 2009. Slovenia is the third EU country home to a June Movement; although this party did not run in the 2004 elections, it planned to do so in 2009. The Slovenians use the same symbols as the Danish movement. The June Movements of these various countries are all members of the EUDemocrats.

In the European Parliament, the June Movement participated in the Independence/Democracy group. In 2005, some prominent members of the June Movement decided to leave the organisation because they disagreed with certain conservative or traditionalist parties which participated in the Independence and Democracy group. Since then, the Lega Nord and most MEPs of the League of Polish Families also left the Independence/Democracy group. The group did not survive the 2009 elections.

== See also ==
- List of political parties in Denmark
