= Demokrāti.lv =

Latvian political party

- Leader: Edgars Jansons
- Founder: Māris Gulbis; Ināra Ostrovska
- Founded: 2004
- Registered: 11 June 2005
- Dissolved: 2011
- Split from: New Era Party
- Ideology: Regionalism; Anti-globalization; Soft Euroscepticism
- Political position: Left-wing
- European affiliation: EUDemocrats
- Colours: Blue; Orange

Website
- demokrati.lv

The Demokrāti.lv, known as the New Democrats (Latvian: Jaunie Demokrāti, JD) prior to 2009, was a left-wing and "Euro-realist" political party in Latvia. It was formed in 2004 when two members of the Latvian parliament, Māris Gulbis and Ināra Ostrovska broke away from the New Era Party. The New Democrats were aligned with the pan-European EUDemocrats organisation.

== History ==
The party was formed in 2004, when two MPs, Māris Gulbis and Ināra Ostrovska, left the New Era Party Parliamentary Club, founding a political party called “New Democrats” (“Jaunie Demokrāti”) on 11 June 2005.

In 2005, the party was one of the founders of EUDemocrats, a left-wing Eurosceptic European political party.

The party tried to foster ties with regionalist parties such as the For Latvia and Ventspils, sending an invitation to the leader of the party mayor Aivars Lembergs.

The New Democrats won 1.27% of vote and no seats in the parliament in 2006 election. After the election, they started talks with For Fatherland and Freedom/LNNK about a possible merger, which were unsuccessful.

On 28 March 2009, the party held a party congress where it changed its name to Demokrāti.lv and adopted a new logo.

After the 2009 rebrand, the party participated in the 2009 Latvian municipal elections, gaining few seats. Before the 2010 Latvian parliamentary election the party was one of the founders of the Made in Latvia political alliance, but shortly afterwards was expelled from it.

On March 10, 2011, the party announced that it had dissolved. Its last chairman was Edgars Jansons.

== Ideology ==
The party was considered left-wing and anti-globalization. It portrayed itself as anti-elitist and Eurosceptic, and argued that the Latvian membership in the EU led to unaccountable governments, exacerbated poverty and arbitrary decision. Its program stated: "Eurosceptics offer you the opportunity to put an end to irresponsibility, poverty and the arbitrariness of Brussels and its minions. First, we will make those in power accountable to the people by reforming the Constitution and the electoral system. (...) The people of Latvia must regain the right to initiate referendums on EU issues, which was taken away from the people in a joint vote in May 2003 by the Euro-right parties."

Demokrāti.lv stated that the government of Latvia failed to address the "real causes of the country's underdevelopment" and promised a governance where "the state and politics should not be used to increase the wealth of a limited number of individuals" should it be elected. The party was heavily sceptical of the European Union, and was a part and co-founder of the EUDemocrats. The party was also regionalist and stressed the importance of local governments, and tried to cooperate with fellow regionalist parties of Latvia.

== Election results ==
=== Saeima ===
Election year	# of votes	% of vote	# of overall seats won	+/–	Government
2006	11,505	1.28 (#11)	0 / 100	New	Extra-parliamentary
