= Sören Wibe =

Swedish economist and politician (1946–2010)

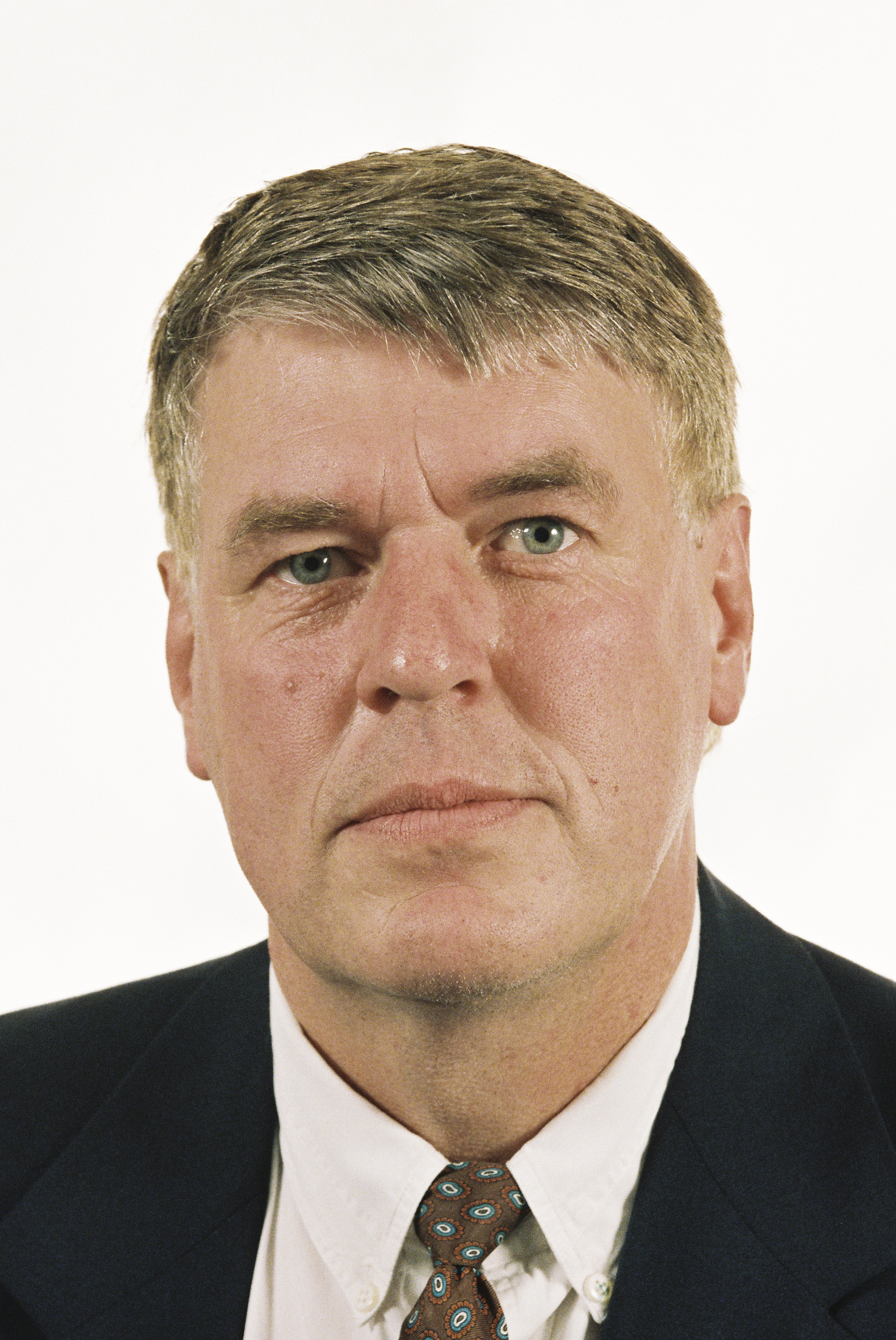
- Wibe in 1994

Member of the European Parliament
- In office 1995–1999

Member of the Riksdag
- In office 2002–2006

Personal details
- Born: 8 October 1946 Östersund, Sweden
- Died: 29 December 2010 (aged 64) Umeå, Sweden
- Party: June List
- Other political affiliations: SAP; EUDemocrats
- Occupation: economist and politician

Sören Axel Wibe (8 October 1946 – 29 December 2010) was a Swedish economist and eurosceptic politician, born in Östersund. He was a Member of the European Parliament (MEP) from the Swedish Social Democratic Party 1995–1999, a member of the Riksdag 2002–2006, and party leader of the June List 2008–2010. In January 2009 he was elected President of the EUDemocrats – Alliance for a Europe of Democracies, a eurosceptic European political party with members from 15 European countries.

Wibe was professor of forest industrial economics at the Swedish University of Agricultural Sciences in Umeå. He was one of the most prominent and vocal EU critics in the Social Democratic Party. In April 2008, he announced his resignation from the party citing a number broken promises over EU policy and rulings in the European Court of Justice, which he alleged would lead to a weakening of the trade unions' position and limitations on strike actions in Sweden. Wibe was also actively involved in the European No Campaign against the proposed European Constitution.

Shortly after leaving the Social Democrats, he was nominated as one of two new party leaders for the June List together with Annika Eriksson. In January 2009, Eriksson left her post, after which Wibe was the lone leader of the party and its top candidate for the European elections 2009.

In the Fall of 1990, Wibe was a Fellow at the Swedish Collegium for Advanced Study in Uppsala, Sweden.

Wibe died on 29 December 2010 in Umeå after a short illness.

== Bibliography ==
- Miljöeffekter av skattereformen (1990)
- Samhällsekonomiska aspekter på ekonomisk brottslighet (1991)
- Maktens geografi : statliga kommittéers regionala sammansättning (1991)
- Marknaden för skogsbränsle : en analys av hur marknaden för skogsbränsle påverkar skogsindustrins råvaruförsörjning (1992)
- Långtidsutredningen 1992 (1992)
- Forests : market and intervention failures : five case studies (1992)
- Economic growth and the environment (1994)
- Non wood benefits in forestry : survey of valuation studies (1994)
- Är tillväxten exponentiell? (1994)
- EU problem för svensk ekonomi (1994)
- Struktur och produktivitetsutveckling inom svensk industri 1970/1990 (1995)
- Efterfrågan på tyst boende (1997)
- "Vaxholmsfallet och den svenska modellen" : en kort beskrivning av bakgrund, argument och sakläge (2006)
- Etanolens koldioxideffekt : en översikt av forskningsläget (2010)
