= Lars Wohlin =

Swedish politician

Member of the European Parliament
- In office 2004–2009

Personal details
- Born: 24 June 1933
- Died: 24 September 2018 (aged 85)
- Political party: June List; Kristdemokraterna
- Occupation: politician; economic; professor

Lars Magnus Wohlin (24 June 1933 – 24 September 2018) was a Swedish politician and Member of the European Parliament (MEP). He was elected into the European Parliament as a member of the June List, but later joined Kristdemokraterna.

He sat on the European Parliament's Committee on Economic and Monetary Affairs. He was also a substitute for the Committee on Budgets, a member of the temporary committee on policy challenges and budgetary means of the enlarged Union 2007–2013, and a member of the delegation for relations with the countries of Southeast Asia and the Association of Southeast Asian Nations.

== Career ==
- Degree in economics (1960)
- Ph.D. economics (Stockholm, 1970)
- Assistant professor, University of Uppsala
- Head of the Research Institute of Industrial Economics (1973-1976)
- Undersecretary of State, Ministry of Finance (1976-1979)
- Head of Sveriges Riksbank (Bank of Sweden) (1979-1982)
- Head of Stadshypotek (mortgage bank) 1982–1996)
- Member of the Board of Bank for International Settlements
- Governor representing Sweden on the Board of the IMF

Government offices
Preceded by Carl Henrik Nordlander	Governor of the Swedish National Bank; 1979–1982	Succeeded by Bengt Dennis
