= Hanne Dahl =

Danish priest and former politician

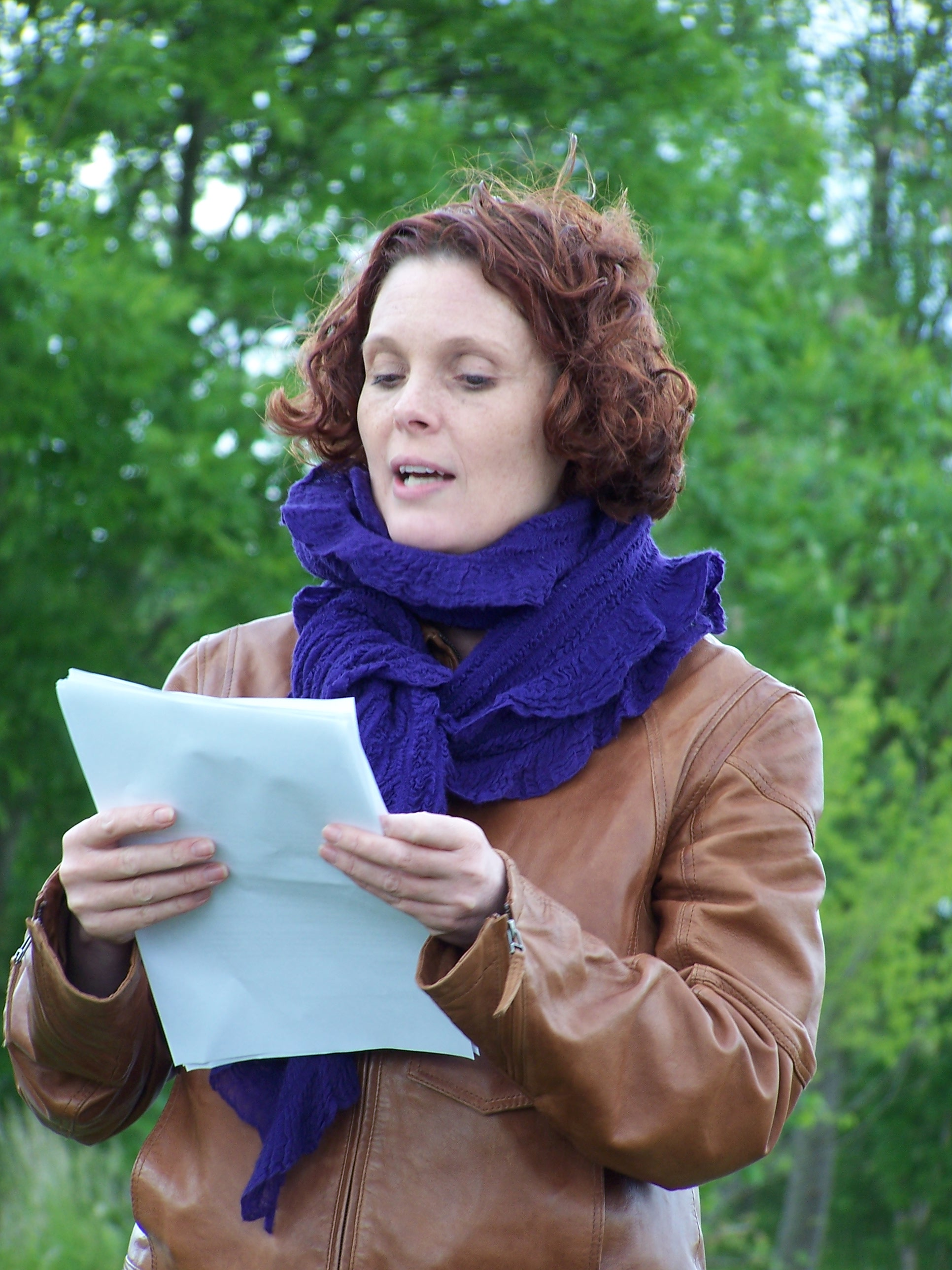

Personal details
- Born: 30 August 1970 (age 55) Aalborg, Denmark
- Party: June Movement (until 2009)
- Occupation: Priest

Hanne Dahl (born 30 August 1970) is a Danish priest and former politician from Aalborg. She was a member of the European Parliament, representing the June Movement (Danish: Junibevægelsen) 2008–2009.

== Biography ==
Dahl grew up partly in Malaysia, Indonesia and Singapore, where she attended international American schools, graduated from Aarhus Cathedral School in 1990 and studied theology at Aarhus University from 1991. She worked as a project worker 1999-2002, free church pastor in Himmerland 1998-2005, project manager 2002-2004, political assistant in the EU Parliament 2004-2008. She was also a regular commentator on Weekendavisen 2000-2002 and a member of the board of the Free Teachers' College in Ollerup 2002-2004.

In 2009, she was appointed acting parish priest in Hasseris parish near Aalborg. The following year she became pastor of Morsø Free Church in Øster Jølby. Since 2014, she has been a student chaplain at Aalborg Budolfi Deanery.

== Policy ==
Hanne Dahl has been a member of the Social Liberal Party. She was a parliamentary candidate for Democratic Renewal in 1998, a candidate for the European Parliament for the June Movement in 1999, since 2000 a member of the June Movement's national executive committee, political committee and spokesperson for the movement, and chairman of the June Movement's leadership from 2005.

In the 2004 European elections, she became a first deputy member of parliament. She replaced Jens-Peter Bonde as a member of parliament when he resigned in 2008.

In the European Parliament, she was until June 2009 co-chair of the Independence/Democracy Group (IND/DEM), vice-chair of the delegation for relations with Switzerland, Iceland and Norway and the EEA Joint Parliamentary Committee, member of the Committee on Constitutional Affairs, deputy member of the Committee on the Environment, Public Health and Food Safety, the Committee on Budgetary Control and the Committee on the Internal Market and consumer protection. She was also chairman of the European cooperation party EUDomocraterne. At the time, she was the only Dane in the Conference of Presidents of the European Parliament, which determines the procedure in the parliament.

For a short period in 1986, Hanne Dahl was head of the secretariat for the National Organisation of Primary and Lower Secondary School Pupils
