= June List =

June List Junilistan
- Founded: 2004
- Dissolved: 2014
- Headquarters: Vasagatan 40, Stockholm
- Ideology: Euroscepticism; Decentralisation; Regionalism
- Political position: Left-wing
- European affiliation: EUDemocrats
- European Parliament group: Independence/Democracy (2004–2009)
- Colours: Orange

Website
- junilistan.se (defunct)

The June List (Swedish: Junilistan, jl) was a Swedish left Eurosceptic political party. Founded in 2004, it received 14% in the European Parliament election of the same year - gaining three seats. In the elections of 2009, however, it saw a drop of 11 percentage points in support and lost all of its seats. Due to its subsequent decline the party has been inactive since the 2014 European Parliament election.

The party also ran in the Swedish 2006 parliamentary election, but it only received 0.47% of the votes, far below the 4% needed to get into parliament.

== History ==
=== Foundation ===
The party was formed in 2003 in the wake of the Swedish euro referendum held in September, in which the adoption of the euro was rejected. The party was founded by Nils Lundgren, former member of the Swedish Social Democratic Party and chief economist of the bank Nordea, Lars Wohlin, former member of the Christian Democrats and Jesper Katz.

Lundgren hoped to receive support from eurosceptical voters dissatisfied with their usual parties' positive attitudes towards the euro and further European integration. Among the Swedish parties represented in parliament at the time, only the Left Party, Center Party and the Green Party were eurosceptic, while the Social Democratic Party, the major left-wing party, and all right-wing parties with exception of the Center party were positive towards European integration. Aiming at receiving support from this broad political spectrum, the board of the party contained people that had been previously active in both left- and right-wing parties.

The party takes its name from the June Movement in Denmark, which is a eurosceptic party named after the timing of the Danish referendum that rejected the Treaty of Maastricht. The June Movement was also a major source of inspiration for the June List.

=== In the European Parliament (2004–2009) ===
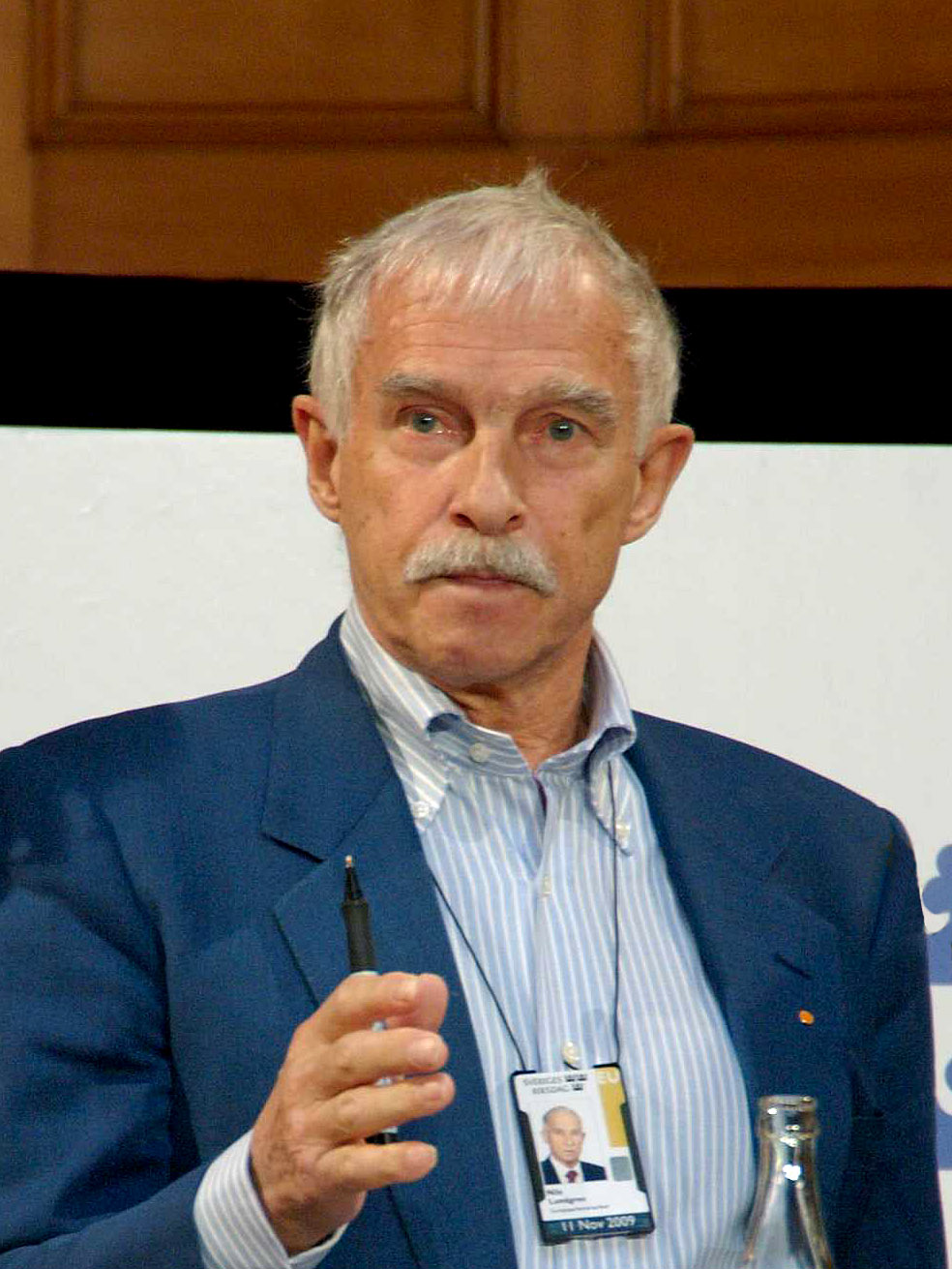
Nils Lundgren, 2007

The party succeeded in capturing 14% of the votes in the 2004 European Parliament election, thereby gaining three of the 19 Swedish seats. The three MEPs were Nils Lundgren, former social democrat Hélène Goudin and former Christian democrat Lars Wohlin. The June List was one of the founding members of the Independence and Democracy group in the European Parliament.

In 2006 Wohlin, left the June List for the Christian Democrats, leaving the party with only two seats. Wohlin stated that he wanted to be able to "work for the Christian Democrats and the Alliance for Sweden in the 2006 parliamentary election" as reason for leaving the June List.

The June List was on the ballot for the 2006 parliamentary elections in Sweden. The party's platform during the election focused on a few main issues: to increase the number of people working in the private sector, hence increasing the state's tax income, a referendum on the European Union constitution and nuclear power, and increased municipal autonomy and more local referendums. All issues that were not in the party's relatively short party program were left to the approximately 100 candidates to decide on. The voters were encouraged to choose to vote for a particular June List candidate that they preferred rather than to cast a general ballot for the party itself.

At one point, it seemed possible that the party might be able to break the 4% threshold necessary to enter parliament, with the party reaching 4.5% in the polls in September 2005, but after that peak the party's support plummeted well below the 4% barrier and in the months before the election it became clear that the party would not be taking seats in parliament that year. In the end, the party received only 26,072 votes (0.47%).

Nils Lundgren resigned as party leader in March 2008. The party decided to elect two co-leaders instead of one party leader. They elected Sören Wibe, former MEP and MP for the Swedish Social Democratic Party, and Annika Eriksson, long-time member of the party's governing board. Eriksson resigned after five months in January 2009 because of disagreements with Wibe and the party governing board.

Swedish businessman Sven Hagströmer, one of the two men who gave his name to the Hagströmer & Qviberg group of companies, served on the board of the party.

=== Decline (2009-2014) ===
The June List suffered a significant decline in its support at the 2009 European Parliament election and lost all of its seats in the European parliament. The party had hoped that Wibe would attract Eurosceptic voters. After the election, the party elected Wibe and Birgitta Swedenborg as co-leaders. Wibe died on 29 December 2010 after a short illness, leaving Swedenborg as sole party leader until she resigned in 2013.

The party was briefly revived for the 2014 European Parliament election. The party selected Jörgen Appelgren, former chief economist of Nordea and member of the Social Democratic Party, as the new party leader and front-runner. The second front-runner was Camilla Lindberg, former MP for the Liberal People's Party. The party received only 11,629 votes nationwide.

== Election results ==
=== Parliament (Riksdag) ===
Election	Votes	%	Seats	+/-	Government	Ref.
2006	26,072	0.47	0 / 349	New	Extra-parliamentary	

=== European Parliament ===
Election	Votes	%	Seats	+/-	Ref.
2004	363,472	14.47	3 / 22	New	
2009	112,355	3.55	0 / 22	▼3	
2014	11,629	0.31	0 / 22		

== See also ==
- Referendums in Sweden
- List of political parties in Sweden
