= List of Declan Ganley companies =

A list of organizations founded/run by the Irish businessman Declan Ganley is given below.

== List ==
Organization	Assoc. location (Ireland)	Assoc. location (Other)	Assoc. personnel (Ireland)	Assoc. personnel (Other)	Funded or established by	Notes
Adornis.com	see article	see article	see article	see article	see article	Dot-com online jewelry retailer, collapsed.
Anglo Adriatic Investment Fund SA	see article	see article	see article	see article	see article	Albanian investment fund, collapsed.
Arpent.com						Technology company.
BroadNet	see article	see article	see article	see article	see article	Bought up European telecoms licences, later bought out by Comcast
Cable Bulgaria		19 Tzar Boris III Blvd, 4th Floor, Sofia 1612, Bulgaria.			Ganley Group.	
Capital Route Private Hire Ltd		2nd Floor, 167-169 Great Portland Street, London, W1W 5PF.			Ganley Group.	Incorporated on 07/01/2002
Cellstar						CellStar Ireland's address is given as "C/O Chase Manhattan Bank (Ireland), Chase Manhattan House, IFSC, Dublin 1, Ireland"
European Telecommunications Holdings NV	see article	see article	see article	see article	see article	Part of Broadnet, later bought out by Comcast
Ganley Group	Moyne Park, Tuam, County Galway		Francis O'Flaherty, James O'Reilly, Martina Higgins; Montu Bashambu		Private investors	Equity investments firm founded 1990. Its website is here.
Ganley International	Moyne Park, Tuam, County Galway					Previously known as Acegrind.
Grand Portage Limited	Moyne Park, Tuam, County Galway					Founded by Ganley during his attempt to buy Irish Fertiliser Industries Subsidiary of Grande Portage Resources Ltd (Canada), a shell company with no net assets and no income.
Growth Plus Ireland						
Guardian Net	Moyne Park, Tuam, County Galway					Unsuccessfully sought a mobile phone licence for Iraq.
Kipelova Forestry Enterprises		Latvia Russian Federation				Sold in 1997, successful forestry business.
Libertas Foundation Limited	Moyne Park, Tuam, County Galway					Research and advocacy organization formed to advocate the ideals of the Libertas Party Limited, with aspirations to become a European political foundation.
Libertas Institute Limited	Moyne Park, Tuam, County Galway (Note: The CRO entry for the Libertas Institute gives these details: Type: Company, Number: 428569; Name: The Libertas Institute Limited, Address: Moyne Park, Tuam, County Galway, Ireland; Registered: 24/10/2006,)		Caroline Simons; Chris Coughlan, David Cochrane, James O'Reilly, John McGuirk, Martina Higgins, Naoise Nunn, Norrie Keane, Seán Ganley, (brother of Declan)			Lobby group that successfully campaigned for a "no" vote in the 2008 referendum in Ireland on the Treaty of Lisbon. Sometimes called Libertas.org to distinguish it from the political party.
Libertas Party Limited	Moyne Park, Tuam, County Galway	7th Floor, Avenue de Cortenbergh 71, Brussels 1000, Belgium.		Jens-Peter Bonde; Robin Matthews		Political party formed to contend the 2009 European elections, with aspirations to become a European political party. Sometimes called Libertas.eu to distinguish it from the lobby group.
Liberty Mobile						Unsuccessfully sought a mobile phone licence for Iraq.
Platform Ltd	Moyne Park, Tuam, County Galway					Later Rivada Solutions.
Rivada Solutions	Moyne Park, Tuam, County Galway					Formerly Platform, founded June 2000.
Rivada Networks	Moyne Park, Tuam, County Galway	2231 Crystal Drive, Suite 1101 Arlington, Virginia 22202-3727 USA, 7899 Lexington Drive, Suite 250 Colorado Springs, Colorado 80920 USA,	David Cochrane, James O'Reilly, Francis O'Flaherty, Martina Higgins, Montu Bashambu, Naoise Nunn, Norrie Keane,	Clint Smith, Dennis McCarthy, Don DeMarino, James Tackett, Jim Loy, John J. Kelly Jr., John Kneuer, Ken Fields, Robert F. Duncan, William J. Atkins,	Ganley Group.	Secure quickly-deployable telecommunications. Website is here.
