= Tunbridge Wells (disambiguation) =

Tunbridge Wells is a short name for Royal Tunbridge Wells, a town in west Kent in England, on the northern edge of the Weald.

Tunbridge Wells may also refer to:

- Tunbridge Wells (UK Parliament constituency), a parliamentary constituency represented in the House of Commons of the Parliament of the United Kingdom
- Tunbridge Wells F.C., a football club based in Royal Tunbridge Wells, Kent, England
- Tunbridge Wells railway station, a railway station in Kent
- Borough of Tunbridge Wells, a local government district and borough in Kent, England
- Disgusted of Tunbridge Wells, a proverbial letters to the editor sign-off-name in the United Kingdom
- Tunbridge Wells (play), a 1678 comedy by Thomas Rawlins
