= Twenty-eighth Amendment of the Constitution Bill 2008 =

Referendum on the Treaty of Lisbon

- 12 June 2008
- To permit the state to ratify the Treaty of Lisbon

Results
Choice	Votes	%
Yes	752,451	46.60%
No	862,415	53.40%
Valid votes	1,614,866	99.62%
Invalid or blank votes	6,171	0.38%
Total votes	1,621,037	100.00%
Registered voters/turnout	3,051,278	53.13%
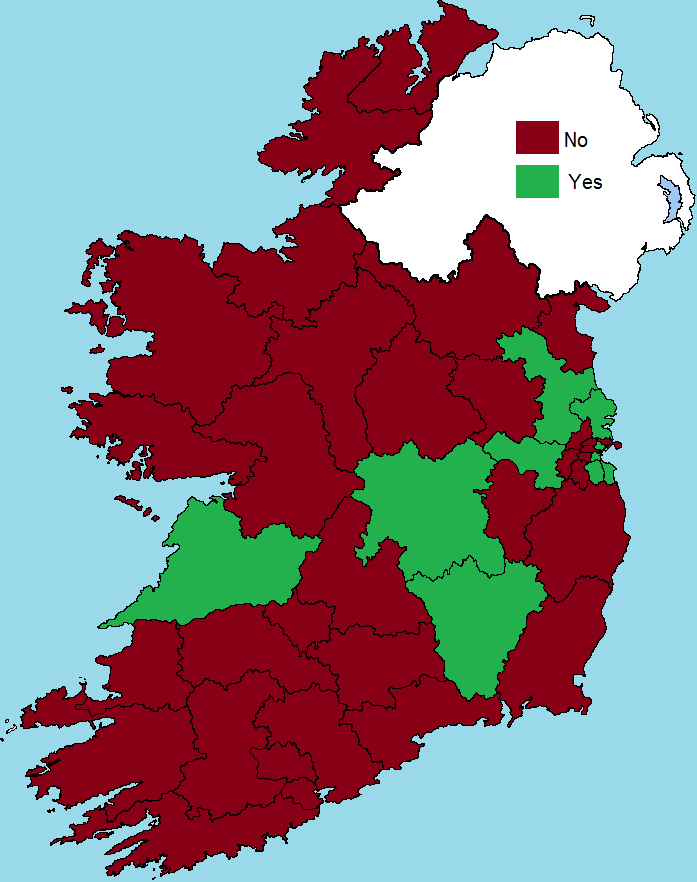
- Results by constituency

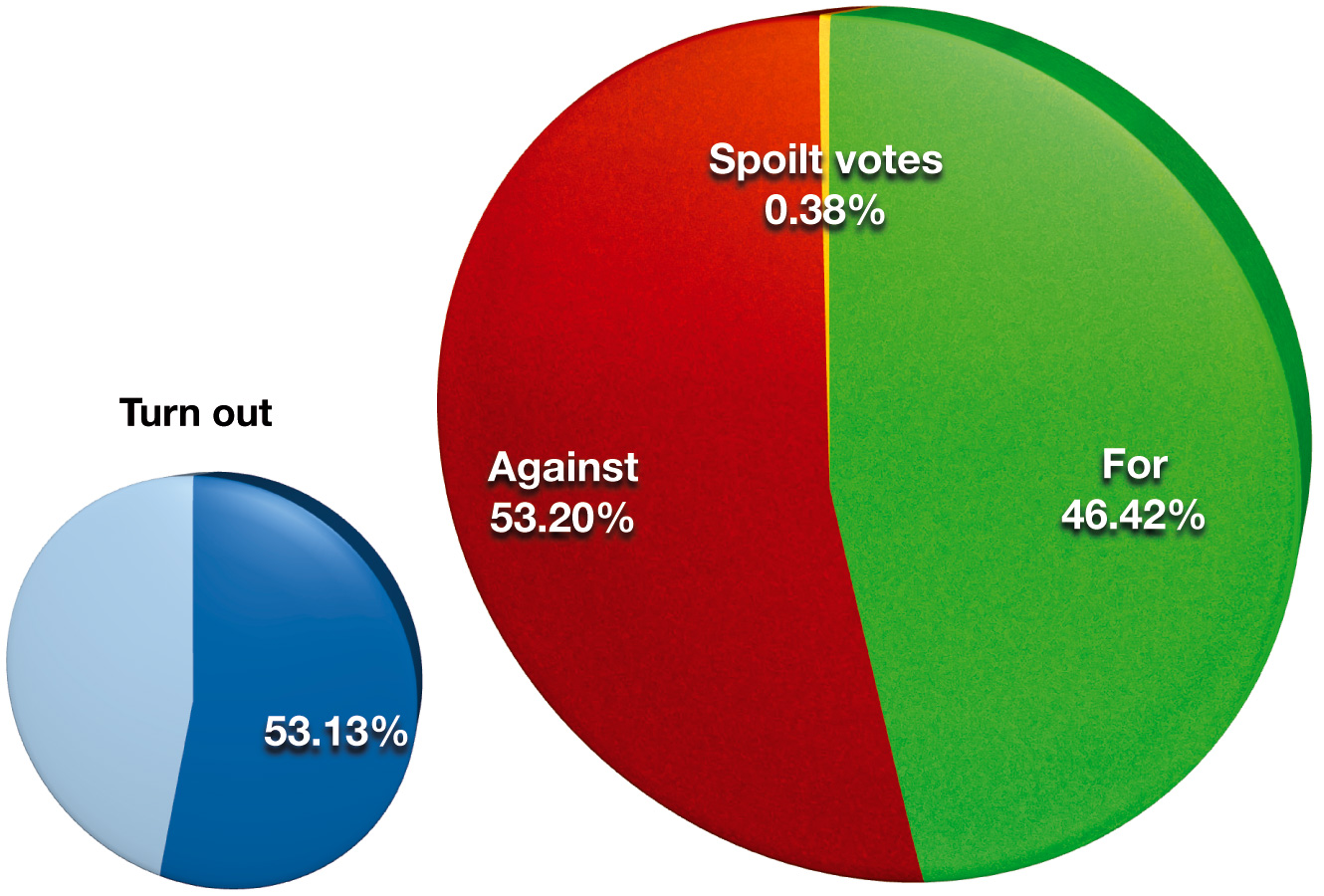
Result and turnout for the referendum

The Twenty-eighth Amendment of the Constitution Bill 2008 (bill no. 14 of 2008) was a proposed amendment to the Constitution of Ireland that was put to a referendum in 2008 (the first Lisbon referendum). The purpose of the proposed amendment was to allow the state to ratify the Treaty of Lisbon of the European Union.

The amendment was rejected by voters on 12 June 2008 by a margin of 53.4% to 46.6%, with a turnout of 53.1%. The treaty had been intended to enter into force on 1 January 2009, but had to be delayed following the Irish rejection. However, the Lisbon treaty was approved by Irish voters when the Twenty-eighth Amendment of the constitution was approved in the second Lisbon referendum, held in October 2009.

== Background ==
The Treaty of Lisbon was signed by the member states of the European Union on 13 December 2007. It was in large part a revision of the text of the Treaty establishing a Constitution for Europe after its rejection in referendums in France in May 2005 and in the Netherlands in June 2005. The Treaty of Lisbon preserved most of the content of the Constitution, especially the new rules on the functioning of the European Institutions, but gives up any symbolic or terminologic reference to a Constitution. (See Treaty of Lisbon compared to the European Constitution.)

Because of the decision of the Supreme Court in Crotty v. An Taoiseach (1987), an amendment to the Constitution was required before it could be ratified by Ireland. Ireland was the only one of the 27 EU member states to put the Treaty to the people in a referendum. Ratification of the Treaty in all other member states was decided upon by national parliaments alone.

== Proposed changes to the text ==
The Twenty-eighth Amendment of the Constitution Bill proposed to make the following changes to Article 29.4:

Deletion of subsections 9° and 11:

9° The State shall not adopt a decision taken by the European Council to establish a common defence pursuant to Article 1.2 of the Treaty referred to in subsection 7° of this section where that common defence would include the State. 11° The State may ratify the Agreement relating to Community Patents drawn up between the Member States of the Communities and done at Luxembourg on the 15th day of December, 1989.

Subsection 10° renumbered as subsection 9°.

Insertion of the following subsections:

10° The State may ratify the Treaty of Lisbon amending the Treaty on European Union and the Treaty establishing the European Community, signed at Lisbon on the 13th day of December 2007, and may be a member of the European Union established by virtue of that Treaty.

11° No provision of this Constitution invalidates laws enacted, acts done or measures adopted by the State that are necessitated by the obligations of membership of the European Union referred to in subsection 10 of this section, or prevents laws enacted, acts done or measures adopted by the said European Union or by institutions thereof, or by bodies competent under the treaties referred to in this section, from having the force of law in the State.

12° The State may exercise the options or discretions provided by or under Articles 1.22, 2.64, 2.65, 2.66, 2.67, 2.68 and 2.278 of the Treaty referred to in subsection 10 of this section and Articles 1.18 and 1.20 of Protocol No. 1 annexed to that Treaty, but any such exercise shall be subject to the prior approval of both Houses of the Oireachtas.

13° The State may exercise the option to secure that the Protocol on the position of the United Kingdom and Ireland in respect of the area of freedom, security and justice annexed to the Treaty on the European Union and the Treaty on the Functioning of the European Union (formerly known as the Treaty establishing the European Community) shall, in whole or in part, cease to apply to the State, but any such exercise shall be subject to the prior approval of both Houses of the Oireachtas.

14° The State may agree to the decisions, regulations or other acts under —

i. Article 1.34(b)(iv),
ii. Article 1.56 (in so far as it relates to Article 48.7 of the Treaty referred to in subsection 4 of this section),
iii. Article 2.66 (in so far as it relates to the second subparagraph of Article 65.3 of the Treaty on the Functioning of the European Union),
iv. Article 2.67 (in so far as it relates to subparagraph (d) of Article 69A.2, the third subparagraph of Article 69B.1 and paragraphs 1 and 4 of Article 69E of the Treaty on the Functioning of the European Union),
v. Article 2.144(a),
vi. Article 2.261 (in so far as it relates to the second subparagraph of Article 270a.2 of the Treaty on the Functioning of the European Union), and
vii. Article 2.278 (in so far as it relates to Article 280H of the Treaty on the Functioning of the European Union), of the Treaty referred to in subsection 10 of this section, and may also agree to the decision under the second sentence of the second subparagraph of Article 137.2 of the Treaty on the Functioning of the European Union (as amended by Article 2.116(a) of the Treaty referred to in the said subsection 10), but the agreement to any such decision, regulation or act shall be subject to the prior approval of both Houses of the Oireachtas.

15° The State shall not adopt a decision taken by the European Council to establish a common defence pursuant to —

i. Article 1.2 of the Treaty referred to in subsection 7 of this section, or
ii. Article 1.49 of the Treaty referred to in subsection 10 of this section, where that common defence would include the State.

== Oireachtas debate ==
On 26 February 2008, the Government of Ireland approved the text of the changes to the constitution. The Twenty-eighth Amendment of the Constitution Bill was proposed in Dáil Éireann by Minister for Foreign Affairs Dermot Ahern on 2 April 2008. It passed final stages in the Dáil on 29 April, with Sinn Féin TDs and Independent TD Tony Gregory rising against, but with insufficient numbers to call a vote. It passed final stages in the Seanad on 7 May.

== Campaign ==
Campaign posters in St Stephen's Green, Dublin

A Referendum Commission was established by Minister for the Environment, Heritage and Local Government John Gormley. It was chaired by former High Court judge Iarfhlaith O'Neill. Its role was to prepare one or more statements containing a general explanation of the subject matter of the proposal and of the text of the proposal in the amendment bill.

=== Participants ===
Participants were:

Organisation	Notable personnel	Stance
Cóir	Richard Greene, Niamh Uí Bhríain	No
Independent Workers Union of Ireland	Patricia Campbell	No
Irish Alliance for Europe	Ruairi Quinn	Yes
Irish Congress of Trade Unions	David Begg	Yes
Irish Creamery Milk Suppliers Association	Jackie Cahill	Yes
Irish Farmers' Association	Padraig Walshe	Yes
Fianna Fáil	Brian Cowen	Yes
Fine Gael	Enda Kenny	Yes
Green Party	John Gormley, Patricia McKenna	Mixed
Labour Party	Eamon Gilmore	Yes
Libertas	Declan Ganley	No
National Platform	Anthony Coughlan	No
Peace and Neutrality Alliance	Roger Cole	No
People's Movement	Patricia McKenna	No
Progressive Democrats	Ciarán Cannon	Yes
SIPTU	Jack O'Connor	Neutral
Sinn Féin	Gerry Adams, Mary Lou McDonald	No
Socialist Party	Joe Higgins	No
People Before Profit	Richard Boyd Barrett	No
Socialist Workers Party	?	No
Technical Electrical and Engineering Union	Eamon Devoy	No
Workers' Party	Mick Finnegan	No

=== Events ===
The government parties of Fianna Fáil and the Progressive Democrats were in favour of the treaty, but the other government party, the Green Party, was divided on the issue. At a special convention on 19 January 2008, the leadership of the Green Party failed to secure a two-thirds majority required to make support for the referendum official party policy. The result of the vote was 63% in favour. As a result, the Green Party itself did not participate in the referendum debate, although individual members were free to be involved in whatever side they chose; all Green Party members of the Oireachtas supported the Treaty. The main opposition parties of Fine Gael and the Labour Party were also in favour. Only one party represented in the Oireachtas, Sinn Féin, was opposed to the treaty, while minor parties opposed to it included the Socialist Party, the Workers' Party and the Socialist Workers Party. Independent TD's Tony Gregory and Finian McGrath, Independent MEP Kathy Sinnott, and Independent members of the Seanad from the universities David Norris, Shane Ross and Rónán Mullen advocated a No vote as well.

The Taoiseach Bertie Ahern warned against making Ireland a 'battlefield' for eurosceptics across Europe. The invitation by UCD's Law Society to French far-right politician Jean-Marie Le Pen was seen as an example of this. Nigel Farage, leader of the United Kingdom Independence Party, committed his party to supporting the No campaign saying: “UKIP members will be encouraged to go to Ireland to help.”

The Government sent bilingual booklets written in English and Irish, explaining the Treaty, to all 2.5 million Irish households. However compendiums of the two previous treaties, of which the Lisbon Treaty is intended to be a series of reforms and amendments, remain unavailable in Ireland. Some commentators have argued that the treaty remains essentially incomprehensible in the absence of such a compendium.

On 12 March 2008, Libertas, a lobby group started by businessman Declan Ganley launched a campaign called Facts, not politics which advocated a No vote in the referendum. A month later, the German Chancellor, Angela Merkel appealed to Irish people to vote Yes in the referendum whilst on a visit to Ireland. The anti-Lisbon Treaty campaign group accused the government and Fine Gael of a U-turn on their previous policy of discouraging foreign leaders from visiting Ireland during the referendum campaign. The European Commissioner for the Internal Market Charlie McCreevy admitted he had not read the Treaty from cover to cover, and said "he would not expect any sane person to do so".

At the start of May, the Irish Alliance for Europe launched its campaign for a Yes vote in the referendum this consisted of trade unionists, business people, academics and politicians. Its members include Garret FitzGerald, Ruairi Quinn, Pat Cox and Michael O'Kennedy. The Taoiseach Brian Cowen stated that should any member of the Fianna Fáil parliamentary party campaign against the treaty, they would likely be expelled from the party.

On 21 May 2008, the executive council of the Irish Congress of Trade Unions voted to support a Yes vote in the referendum. Rank and file members of the individual unions were not balloted and the Technical, Engineering and Electrical Union (TEEU) advised its 45,000 members to vote No. The Irish bishops conference stated the Catholic Church's declaration that the treaty would not weaken Ireland's constitutional ban on abortion, however the conference did not advocate either a Yes or No vote. By the start of June, Fianna Fáil, Fine Gael and the Labour Party had united in their push for a Yes vote despite earlier divisions. The two largest farming organisations, the Irish Creamery Milk Suppliers Association (ICMSA) and the Irish Farmers' Association called for a Yes vote, the latter giving its support after assurances from the Taoiseach Brian Cowen that Ireland would use its veto in Europe if a deal on World Trade reform was unacceptable.

== Opinion polls ==
Date of opinion poll	Conductor	Sample size	In favour	Against	Undecided
7 June 2008	Red C	?	42%	39%	19%
5 June 2008	TNS/mrbi	1000	30%	35%	35%
24 May 2008	Red C	?	41%	33%	26%
16 May 2008	TNS/mrbi	1000	35%	18%	47%
10 May 2008	Red C	1000	38%	28%	34%
26 April 2008	Red C	?	35%	31%	34%
14 April 2008	Red C	?	28%	12%	60%
1 March 2008	Red C	?	46%	23%	31%
27 January 2008	Red C	1002	45%	25%	31%
26 January 2008	tns/MRBI	?	26%	10%	66%
October 2007	tns/MRBI	?	25%	13%	62%

== Voting ==
There were 3,051,278 voters on the electoral register. The vast majority of voting took place on Thursday, 12 June between 07:00 and 22:00. Counting began the following morning at 09:00. Several groups voted before the standard polling day:

Some groups were able to cast postal votes before 9 June, namely: members of the Irish Defence Forces serving in United Nations peacekeeping missions; Irish diplomats and their spouses abroad; members of the Garda Síochána; those unable to vote in person due to physical illness or disability; those who would be unable to vote in person due to their employment (including students); and prisoners.

On 9 June, several islands off the coast of County Donegal voted: Tory Island, Inisfree, Gola, Inishbofin and Arranmore Island; these islands are all part of the Donegal South-West constituency. Around 37% of the 745 eligible voted. Two days later, several islands off the coast of Counties Galway and Mayo voted: the Aran Islands (Inis Mór, Inis Meáin and Inis Oírr) and Inishboffin form part of Galway West constituency; while Inishturk, Inishbiggle and Clare Island form part of the Mayo constituency. The Galway islands had 1,169 eligible to vote, while the Mayo islands had 197.

== Result ==
Votes were counted separately in each Dáil constituency. The overall verdict was formally announced by the Referendum Returning officer in Dublin Castle by accumulating the constituency totals.

The national result was as follows:

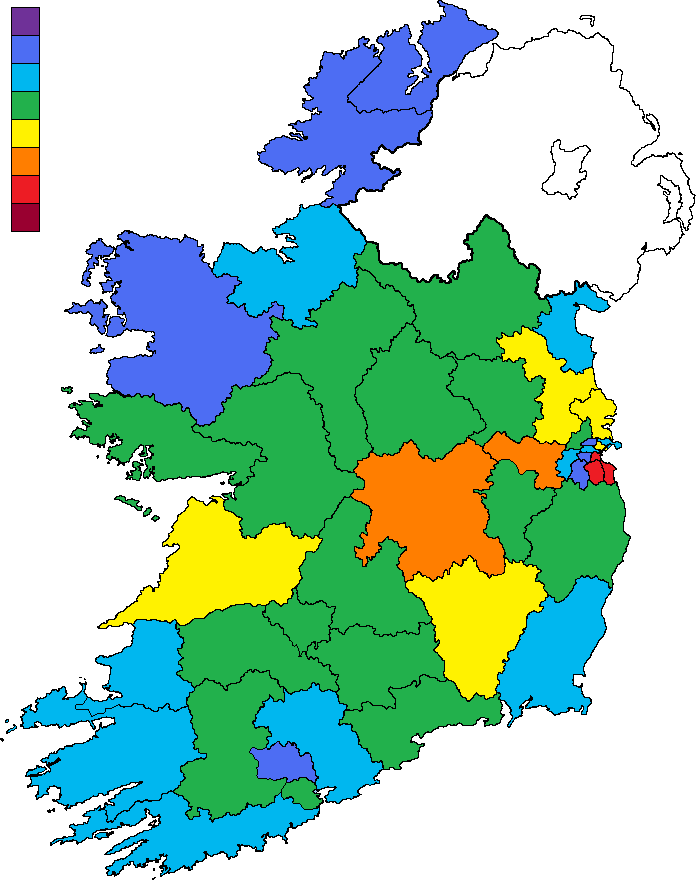
Choropleth map giving percentage vote "Yes". All figures rounded to nearest digit. 65% or more Yes 60% or more Yes 55% or more Yes 50% or more Yes 45% or more Yes 40% or more Yes 35% or more Yes Under 35% Yes

Twenty-eighth Amendment of the Constitution of Ireland Bill 2008
Choice	Votes	%
For	752,451	46.60
Against	862,415	53.40
Total	1,614,866	100.00
Valid votes	1,614,866	99.62
Invalid/blank votes	6,171	0.38
Total votes	1,621,037	100.00
Registered voters/turnout	3,051,278	53.13

Results by constituency
Constituency	Electorate	Turnout (%)	Votes		Proportion of votes	
Constituency	Electorate	Turnout (%)	Yes	No	Yes	No
Carlow–Kilkenny	103,397	50.9%	26,210	26,206	50.0%	50.0%
Cavan–Monaghan	92,920	53.4%	22,346	27,113	45.2%	54.8%
Clare	77,398	52.5%	20,982	19,490	51.8%	48.2%
Cork East	83,850	50.6%	18,177	24,052	43.1%	56.9%
Cork North-Central	65,738	53.4%	12,440	22,546	35.6%	64.4%
Cork North-West	63,574	55.6%	16,253	18,991	46.1%	53.9%
Cork South-Central	89,844	55.1%	22,112	27,166	44.9%	55.1%
Cork South-West	58,225	55.3%	14,235	17,806	44.4%	55.6%
Donegal North-East	56,195	45.7%	9,006	16,504	35.3%	64.7%
Donegal South-West	60,079	46.5%	10,174	17,659	36.6%	63.4%
Dublin Central	57,864	48.9%	12,328	15,816	44.0%	56.0%
Dublin Mid-West	61,622	51.7%	12,577	19,182	40.0%	60.0%
Dublin North	81,550	55.3%	22,696	22,194	51.0%	49.0%
Dublin North-Central	51,156	61.1%	15,772	15,396	51.0%	49.0%
Dublin North-East	52,432	57.2%	12,917	16,973	43.0%	57.0%
Dublin North-West	49,893	52.9%	9,576	16,749	36.0%	64.0%
Dublin South	87,855	58.4%	32,190	19,005	63.0%	37.0%
Dublin South-Central	67,499	51.6%	16,410	25,624	39.0%	61.0%
Dublin South-East	81,743	49.6%	17,111	10,644	62.0%	38.0%
Dublin South-West	56,202	53.6%	12,601	23,456	35.0%	65.0%
Dublin West	52,173	54.5%	13,573	14,754	48.0%	52.0%
Dún Laoghaire	84,710	58.8%	31,524	18,149	64.0%	37.0%
Galway East	80,569	49.8%	18,728	21,230	47.0%	53.0%
Galway West	85,642	50.0%	19,643	23,011	46.0%	54.0%
Kerry North	54,787	51.3%	11,306	16,702	41.0%	59.0%
Kerry South	51,338	53.1%	11,569	15,571	43.0%	57.0%
Kildare North	71,429	51.5%	20,045	16,653	55.0%	45.0%
Kildare South	57,145	48.9%	13,470	14,308	49.0%	51.0%
Laois–Offaly	105,053	54.3%	31,786	24,963	56.0%	44.0%
Limerick East	76,735	51.4%	18,085	21,191	46.0%	54.0%
Limerick West	57,847	51.8%	13,318	16,511	45.0%	55.0%
Longford–Westmeath	81,834	51.4%	19,371	22,502	46.0%	54.0%
Louth	83,458	53.4%	18,586	25,811	42.0%	58.0%
Mayo	95,250	51.3%	18,624	30,001	38.0%	62.0%
Meath East	67,415	50.7%	17,340	16,703	51.0%	49.0%
Meath West	62,816	51.9%	14,442	18,028	45.0%	55.0%
Roscommon–South Leitrim	59,728	56.9%	15,429	18,402	47.0%	54.0%
Sligo–North Leitrim	55,591	52.6%	12,602	16,496	44.0%	56.0%
Tipperary North	55,941	58.5%	16,235	16,367	50.0%	50.0%
Tipperary South	53,687	55.4%	13,853	15,755	47.0%	53.0%
Waterford	72,052	53.4%	17,502	20,812	46.0%	54.0%
Wexford	101,124	52.8%	23,371	29,793	44.0%	56.0%
Wicklow	85,918	60.8%	25,936	26,130	50.0%	50.0%
Total	3,051,278	53.1%	752,451	862,415	46.6%	53.4%

== Reasons for rejection ==
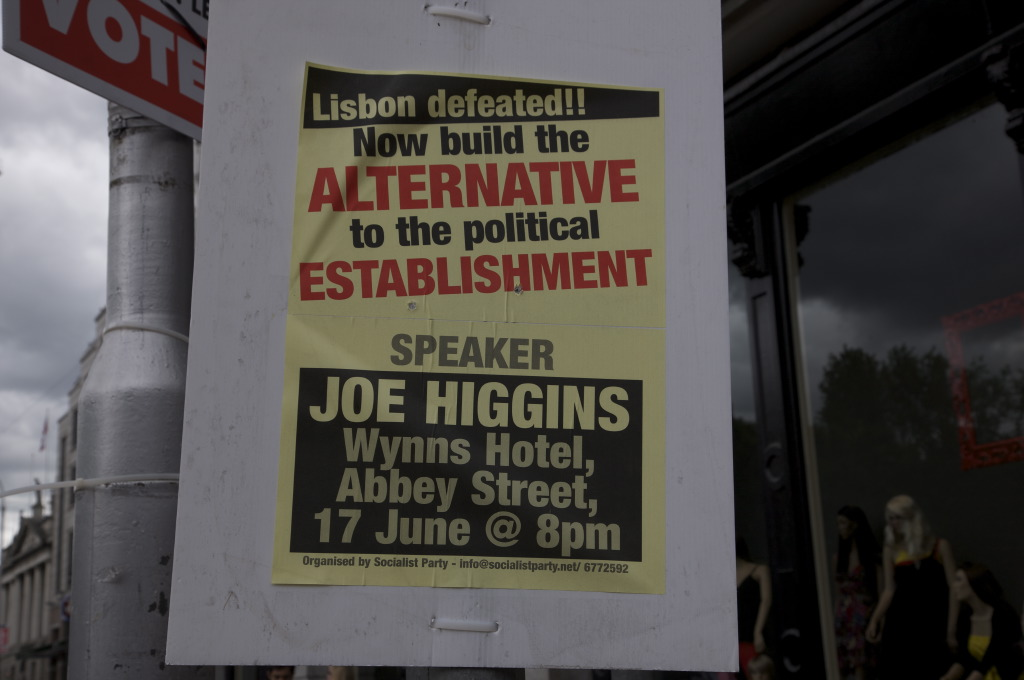
Socialist Party poster celebrating defeat of the referendum

Ireland had begun to cast a skeptical eye on the EU and general concerns about how Europe was developing were raised. In Spring 2007, the Irish citizenry had the second least European identity in the EU, with 59% identifying as exclusively Irish as opposed to wholly/partly European. The integrationist aspects of the Lisbon treaty were therefore also of concern. Few expressed specifically anti-EU statements, but pro-EU sentiments were interpreted or expressed in favour of an idealised/desired EU and expressed concern about its present form or the future direction of the EU post-Lisbon. To keep Ireland's power and identity, voters chose to vote "no".

The International Herald Tribune criticised the Treaty as being obscure and difficult to understand for the average voter, arguing it was intentionally written to be "impenetrable to the masses" in order to be pushed through by "elites". It was pointed out that even members of the Referendum Commission were unable to explain one item of the treaty. Issues such as abortion, tax, euthanasia, the veto, EU directives, qualified majority voting, Ireland's commissioner, the death penalty, Euroarmy conscription, gay marriage, immigration, nuclear energy, workers' rights, sovereignty, and neutrality were raised. The "No" faction could fight on whichever terrain they wished and could give positive reasons for rejecting the treaty, such as the possibility of renegotiation. Conversely, the "Yes" faction could only offer negatives and could only react to the statements of the other side. Lacking a clear identification of specifics, voters chose to vote "No".

In September 2008 rumours in Brussels indicated that US billionaires and neoconservatives heavily influenced the Irish vote by sponsoring the "No" campaigns, particularly those of Declan Ganley's Libertas lobby group. It is said that US interest groups this way pursued their goal of hindering the European Union to become a stronger partner internationally. However, the British conservative MEP Jonathan Evans reported to EUobserver on 9 December 2008 after returning from a European Parliament delegation to the US, "[o]ur congressional colleagues drew our attention to a statement from US deputy secretary of state John Negroponte at Trinity College Dublin on 17 November, completely refuting the suggestion of any US dimension whatsoever". The European Parliament is considering launching "an inquiry to discover whether US agencies actively supported Libertas in the 12 June referendum."

A poll was published by the Irish Times on 18 June 2008. The question was "Why did you vote no?" and the results are given below.

Reason for rejecting the Lisbon Treaty	Percentage
Don't understand/not familiar	40%
Protect Irish identity	20%
Don't trust politicians/Govt policies	17%
Protect neutrality	10%
Keep commissioner	10%
Protect tax system	8%

A Flash Eurobarometer poll of 2,000 random respondents was conducted between 13 and 15 June on behalf of the European Commission by Gallup. Those respondents who voted "no" in the referendum were asked "Please tell me what are the reasons why you voted "no" to the treaty?" and the results are given below.

Reason for rejecting the Lisbon Treaty	Percentage
Because I do not know enough about the Treaty and would not want to vote for something I am not familiar with	22%
To protect Irish identity	12%
To safeguard Irish neutrality in security and defence matters	6%
I do not trust our politicians	6%
We will lose our right to have an Irish Commissioner in every Commission	6%
To protect our tax system	6%
I am against the idea of a unified Europe	5%
To protest against the government's policies	4%
To avoid that the EU speaks with one voice on global issues	4%
Because large Member States decide on EU matters	4%
To protect the influence of small states	3%
It would allow the introduction of European legislation in Ireland, such as gay marriage, abortion, euthanasia	2%
To avoid an influx of immigrants	1%
The EU does not need any fixing, it works fine	1%
Other	14%
Don't know/not applicable	3%

French Europe Minister Jean-Pierre Jouyet blamed "American neoconservatives" for the Irish voter's rejection of the treaty.

== Second referendum ==
In the meeting of the European Council (the meeting of the heads of government of all twenty-seven European Union member states) in Brussels on 11–12 December 2008, Taoiseach Brian Cowen presented the concerns of the Irish people relating to taxation policy, family, social and ethical issues, and Ireland's policy of neutrality. Effectively Ireland's position was renegotiated, and the revised package was approved by the electorate in 2009. Because of the Irish financial crisis it was also apparent that Ireland would need increased financial support from the European Union.

The European Council agreed that:

- the necessary legal guarantees would be given that nothing in the Treaty of Lisbon made any change of any kind to the Union's competences on taxation for any member state;
- the necessary legal guarantees would be given that the Treaty of Lisbon did not prejudice the security and defence policy of any member state, including Ireland's traditional policy of neutrality;
- the necessary legal guarantees would be given that neither the Treaty of Lisbon (including the Justice and Home Affairs provisions), nor the EU Charter of Fundamental Rights, affected the provisions of the Irish Constitution in relation to the right to life, education and the family in any way;
- in accordance with the necessary legal procedures, a Decision would be taken to retain Ireland's Commissioner, provided that the Treaty of Lisbon was ratified;
- the high importance attached to issues including workers' rights would be confirmed.

The Irish Government then committed to seeking ratification of the Treaty of Lisbon by the end of the term of the current European Commission (October 2009), provided that the above were implemented satisfactorily.

The European Council did not specify what forms the legal guarantees would take. The Sunday Business Post stated that what the European Council had offered were Decisions and/or Declarations, not protocols. Decisions and/or Declarations of the European Council are agreements made between all twenty-seven member states of the European Union and are not part of a treaty, whereas protocols are agreements between states as part of a treaty. Previous examples of Decisions and/or Declarations following a referendum rejection include the 1992 Edinburgh Agreement (following the first Danish referendum on the Maastricht Treaty) and the 2002 Seville Declarations on the Treaty of Nice (following the first Irish referendum on the Treaty of Nice). French President Nicolas Sarkozy, speaking to the European Parliament in his capacity as President of the European Council during the six-month presidency of that body by France, stated that the legal guarantees would be added as a protocol later to the treaty, enabling Croatia to join the European Union legally.

The guarantee that Ireland would keep its Commissioner provided Lisbon was ratified was criticised in the Irish Times on the grounds that it may lead to an oversized European Commission.

The Twenty-eighth Amendment in October 2009 formally authorised the government to ratify the Treaty of Lisbon.

== See also ==
- European Commission Representation in Ireland
- Politics of the Republic of Ireland
