= Libertas Institute (Ireland) =

Anti-EU advocacy group (2006–2008)

- Logo of the Libertas Institute.
- Formation: 24 October 2006 (Note: The CRO Archived 29 December 2010 at the Wayback Machine entry for the Libertas Institute gives these details: Type: Company, Number: 428569; Name: The Libertas Institute Limited, Address: Moyne Park, Tuam, County Galway, Ireland; Registered: 24 October 2006,)
- Type: anti Lisbon Treaty advocacy group
- Headquarters: Moyne Park, Tuam, County Galway, Ireland
- Location: Ireland
- Official language: English
- President: Declan Ganley
- Key people: Naoise Nunn, David Cochrane, John McGuirk, James O'Reilly, Norrie Keane, Martina Higgins.
- Website: www.libertas.org

The Libertas Institute is a lobby group that along with others successfully campaigned for a "no" vote in the 2008 referendum in Ireland on the Treaty of Lisbon.

== Mission statement ==
Its mission statement was "...to initiate and provoke enlightened discussion on the European Union, its relevance to its member states and peoples and its role in World affairs having regard to our shared values of peace, democracy, individual liberty and free markets..."

== Founders ==
The founders of the Libertas Institute were:

Founder	Notes
Declan Ganley	Associated with Ganley Group and Rivada Networks.
Naoise Nunn	Associated with Rivada Networks.
James O'Reilly	Associated with Ganley Group and Rivada Networks.
Norrie Keane	Associated with Rivada Networks.
Martina Higgins	Associated with Ganley Group and Rivada Networks.
Seán Ganley	Brother of Declan.
Dr. Chris Coughlan	Later president of the Chambers of Commerce of Ireland

== Personnel ==
Libertas Institute personnel included:

Name	Job(s)	Notes
Declan Ganley	President	Founder
Naoise Nunn	Executive Director	No longer in post
David Cochrane	Publishing Director, later Campaign Manager	Irish political blogger and editor on Politics.ie. Associated with Rivada Networks.
John McGuirk	Communications Director	No longer in post
Caroline Simons	Senior Spokesperson	

== Charter ==
The Libertas Charter (archived here) defined what was considered to be Europe's traditional values and influences, asserted what citizens' rights and responsibilities were, acknowledged the EU's role since WWII, stated that the present EU's structure was inherently undemocratic and unaccountable, and pledged to create a popular movement to debate Europe's future.

The charter was signed by the following:

- Declan J. Ganley
- Naoise Nunn
- Dr. Constantin Gurdgiev
- Paul MacDonnell
- Carlos Rodriguez
- Dr. Jana Hybaskowa, MEP
- Ivan Gabal
- Dr. Chris Coughlan
- Professor Roger Downer
- Artur Osuchowski
- Stephen Nolan
- Dr. Eamonn Conway
- Eamonn Cregan
- Gerard Lawless
- Diego Solana
- Francis O'Flaherty
- James O'Reilly
- David Cochrane
- Keith O'Grady
- Fiona Fallon
- Zoltan Angyal
- Professor Antonio Bar Cendón
- Michael McCann

== Press releases ==
The first Libertas Institute press release archived on the Wayback Machine dates to 22 June 2007. It concerned French President Nicolas Sarkozy and the Treaty of Lisbon's clause regarding free and undistorted competition: an article by Ganley dated 16 July 2007 in Business Week covered similar themes. The Libertas Institute continued to release press releases during its existence.

== Commonality with other organisations ==
Libertas is registered at Moyne Park, Tuam, County Galway along with other organisations associated with Libertas and/or Declan Ganley. A list of organisations associated with Libertas.eu and/or Declan Ganley is given here.

== Funding ==
=== Expenditure ===
2007 expenditure by Libertas Institute Ltd according to its accounts was:

Date	Description
2007–08	Room hire in the Davenport Hotel to discuss strategy
2007–12	Room hire, Merrion Hotel, Dublin for a press conference
2007–12	Photocall & billboard outside Merrion Hotel, Dublin
2007–12	Hire of PR firm Bracken PR, employer of John McGuirk

The deadline for submitting a copy of its 2008 bank statement to SIPO was 31 March 2009.

Expenditure during the Lisbon I campaign was estimated at "approximately €800,000", "exceeded €1 million", or "€1.3 million", or "€1.8 million".

=== Income ===
The Libertas Institute had a loan facility with Ganley, and by 3 October 2008 it had used €200,000 of this money. Since 1 January 2008, it also had the facility to receive public donations via its website. Ganley and his wife (Delia Mary Ganley, née Paterek) also donated the maximum amount of €6,300 each. Libertas stated that its donors were "100% Irish".

=== Regulation ===
The Libertas Institute was a "third party" for the purposes of political fundraising. Regulation of such is monitored by the Standards in Public Office Commission which imposed a donations limit of €5,348 per donor per year, rising to €6,348.69 per donor per year in 2009, imposes a limit of €126.97 for any given anonymous donation, and disallows any donation from any non-Irish citizens resident outside the island of Ireland.

== Aims ==
The Libertas Institute advocated a European Energy Innovation Fund intended to license and fund carbon-neutral energy producers, the funding deriving from auctions of CO_{2} emissions allowances. It also deprecated the Treaty of Lisbon and advocated a "no" vote in Lisbon I, the first Irish referendum on the Treaty of Lisbon.

== Libertas in the Lisbon I campaign ==
On 12 March 2008, Libertas launched a "no" campaign called "Facts, not politics" and stated that they expected to spend in the region of €1.5m on the campaign. The campaign targeted wavering moderates, the most critical votes for the referendum. The campaign was joined by businessman Ulick McEvaddy on 20 April 2008. Activities undertaken by Libertas during the referendum were as follows:

Date	Note
2007–12 to 2008–06	Libertas distribute 35,000 copies of "The Lisbon Treaty, the Readable Version", a text edited by MEP Jens-Peter Bonde and produced by the Foundation for EU Democracy, the European political foundation affiliated to the EUDemocrats, the European political party headed at the time by MEP Jens-Peter Bonde
2007‑12‑13	Ganley speaks at press conference, Dublin.
2008‑04‑21	Ganley campaigns in Castlebar, Sligo and Letterkenny.
2008‑04‑28	John McGuirk defends on the radio Ganley's rejection of the CAP.
2008‑05‑12	Ganley spoke at a Forum on Europe regional meeting, Hotel Meyrick, Galway.
2008‑05‑28	Ganley takes part in a televised debate and states that the Treaty of Lisbon allows the detention of three-year-old children
2008‑05‑29	Ganley campaigns in Sligo.
2008‑05‑31	Ganley speaks at "The Lisbon Treaty – a Modest Proposal or a Faustian Pact" debate.
2008‑06‑02	Press call, Buswells Hotel, Dublin. Ganley stated that a "yes" vote would jeopardise Ireland's corporate tax and that "a No vote would allow the Government to negotiate a 'better deal' for Ireland".
2008‑06‑09	Libertas attend European movement debate in ESB, Dublin
2008‑06‑09	Libertas canvass in Tallaght
2008‑06‑09	Libertas attend Rock The Vote debate, Dublin
2008‑06‑09	Ganley appears on RTÉ's Questions and Answers.
2008‑06‑09	Ganley buys tickets to Brussels for Brian Cowen, Enda Kenny and Eamon Gilmore
2008‑06‑12	Ganley spoke at a public meeting in Ranelagh.

Several politicians, including Minister of State for European Affairs Dick Roche, clashed with the group's campaign stance but the Sunday Business Post reported that the group's efforts at projecting its warnings about the treaty in the media were "hugely successful".

The referendum was held on 12 June 2008 and defeated by 53.4% to 46.6%, with a turnout of 53.1%.

== Aftermath ==
Following the referendum, attention shifted to Ganley's new political party Libertas.eu, and the Libertas Institute website libertas.org was redirected to that party's website.
