= Irish Alliance for Europe =

Alliance for Europe

- Formation: 2002; 24 years ago (initial); January 2008; 18 years ago (refounded)
- Founder: Brigid Laffan (initial); Ruairí Quinn (refounded)
- Type: Political movement
- Legal status: Defunct
- Purpose: Advocating for a yes vote on the Treaty of Nice and Treaty of Lisbon referendums in Ireland
- Region served: Republic of Ireland
- Chair: Ruairi Quinn
- Director: Brendan Kiely
- Campaign Director: Adrian Langan
- Key people: Ruairi Quinn; Brendan Kiely; Michael O'Kennedy; Pat Cox; Garret FitzGerald; Bill Attley; Frank Clarke
- Website: Archive of website

The Irish Alliance for Europe was founded in summer 2002 by Professor Brigid Laffan of University College Dublin in order to lead the civil society campaign in favour of the Treaty of Nice at the second Irish referendum. Adrian Langan was recruited as full-time Campaign Director.

In January 2008, the organisation was resurrected by Ruairi Quinn TD, Michael O'Kennedy, Pat Cox, former Taoiseach Garret FitzGerald, and former CEO of European Movement Ireland, Brendan Kiely, in order to campaign in the referendum to ratify the Lisbon Treaty.

In May 2009, the alliance was referred to the Director of Public Prosecutions (DPP) over failing to provide a certificate of monetary donations to the Standards in Public Office Commission. The DPP later declined to prosecute after the Standards Commission received a certificate and a bank statement relating to donations in August 2009.
