= AAIF =

AAIF or AaIF may refer to:

- Anglo Adriatic Investment Fund SA, English-Albanian financial company
- Aabyhøj IF, football club, Denmark
