= Diarmuid O'Flynn =

Journalist, sportswriter, and political campaigner

- Occupations: Sports writer, activist
- Known for: Ballyhea Says No campaign

Diarmuid O'Flynn is a former journalist, sportswriter and political campaigner who founded the "Ballyhea Says No" campaign. In 2014, he began working as one of MEP Luke Ming Flanagan's parliamentary assistants. He was the Irish Examiner's chief hurling correspondent until his relocation to Brussels in 2014. As founder of the Ballyhea Says No protest movement, which from 2011 to 2020 held regular protest marches against repayments to holders of Irish government debt, O'Flynn has repeatedly called for debts to be written off for Ireland. Among those to have shared this position are the literary editor Fintan O'Toole and economists Constantin Gurdgiev and Stephen Kinsella.

In June 2011, he and others from the Ballyhea Says No campaign embarked on a three-day walk/run/cycle relay from Ballyhea to Dublin to collect signatures for a petition to the government to seek debt write-off for Ireland, thereafter holding a short march in Dublin that culminated in hand-delivery of said petition to the Fine Gael-Labour coalition government. In August that year, he went on a seven-day "bread and water" diet in the attempt to publicise the campaign, losing "about a stone in weight".

In 2014, O'Flynn ran as an Independent candidate in the South constituency at the 2014 European Parliament election, receiving the support of Irish business website Finfacts. During the campaign, he reportedly described abortion as the "ugliest word in the dictionary" and stated that "Everything possible should be done to bring that life [of a foetus] to the birth stage". Having received 4.6% of the vote, which placed him 6th of all first preference votes, O'Flynn was finally eliminated on the 10th count. In November 2014, he was appointed parliamentary assistant to Midlands–North-West MEP Luke 'Ming' Flanagan.

In 2026, The O'Brien Press published his biographical account of his youth playing hurling, Not a patch on the aul fella.
