= Libertas United Kingdom =

Libertas UK may refer to three political parties in the United Kingdom: two are regional affiliates of Declan Ganley's Libertas Party Limited, one of which, Pro-Democracy: Libertas.eu, contended the 2009 European Parliament elections under a common banner with Libertas Party Limited. The third was formed by an associate of the United Kingdom Independence Party (UKIP).

== Pro-Democracy: Libertas.eu ==
Pro-Democracy: Libertas.eu
- Leader: Robin Matthews
- Founded: 10 March 2009
- Headquarters: 52 Grosvenor Gardens, London, SW1 0AU
- Ideology: anti-Lisbon Treaty, Euroscepticism
- European affiliation: Libertas Party Limited
- European Parliament group: none
- Colours: blue, gold

Website
- www.libertas.eu/uk/

Pro-Democracy: Libertas.eu is the name of the Libertas Party Limited affiliate in Great Britain.

On 10 March 2009, it was reported that Libertas intended to field candidates in the UK. Kevin O’Connell, a former deputy director of Europol, former commander in the London Metropolitan Police, and former employee of Libertas stated in The Sunday Times that "if Libertas would have me as a candidate, I would run”. O’Connell was the first person to indicate a willingness to run for Libertas in Britain. Nigel Farage, leader of the United Kingdom Independence Party (UKIP), criticised Libertas's intention to run in the UK, stating: "I'm a little surprised that Libertas want to stand in the UK as their policy seems almost the same as David Cameron's Conservatives'." Ganley dismissed UKIP's position as "reactionary". Former newspaper editor Bridget Rowe, Nigel Farage's press secretary, then registered Libertas UK with the United Kingdom Electoral Commission, making it unclear whether Ganley's Libertas could field candidates in the UK under that name. On 11 February 2009, Libertas announced the opening of its United Kingdom office at Suite 6.8, 52 Grosvenor Gardens, London, United Kingdom, SW1. Ganley gave a press conference on 10 March 2009, at which the party was launched and he introduced Robin Matthews as its leader.

The party originally registered under the name New Dawn for Europe: Libertas.eu, before changing its name to Pro-Democracy: Libertas.eu in April 2009. It is under this name that the party fielded candidates in the June 2009 European Parliamentary elections.

=== Personnel ===
Person	Position
Robin Matthews	Leader
Andrew Jamieson	Nominating Officer
Nicholas Coke	Treasurer

== Libertas NI ==
Libertas NI
- Leader: Robin Matthews
- Founded: 11 March 2009
- Headquarters: 52 Grosvenor Gardens, London, SW1 0AU
- Ideology: anti-Lisbon Treaty, Euroscepticism
- European affiliation: Libertas Party Limited
- European Parliament group: none
- Colours: blue, gold

Website
- www.libertas.eu/uk/

Libertas NI (abbr. unknown: LNI?) is the name of the Libertas Party Limited affiliate in Northern Ireland. It shared offices and some personnel with the Great Britain affiliate but had a different treasurer. It did not field candidates in the 2009 elections.

=== Personnel ===
Person	Position
Robin Matthews	Leader
Andrew Jamieson	Nominating Officer
James Millard	Treasurer

== Libertas UK ==
Libertas UK
- Leader: Bridget Rowe
- Founded: 19 December 2008
- Headquarters: 400 Main Road, Westerham Hill, TN16 2HP.
- Ideology: unknown
- European affiliation: unknown
- European Parliament group: none
- Colours: unknown

Website
- unknown

Libertas UK (abbr. unknown: LUK?) is the name of a political party that was registered to field candidates in England for the 2009 Euroelections.

On 19 December 2008 former newspaper editor Bridget Rowe, a friend of Nigel Farage of UKIP registered Libertas UK with the United Kingdom Electoral Commission, making it unclear whether Ganley's Libertas Party Limited could field candidates in the UK under that name. Rowe's Libertas did not field candidates in the 2009 elections.

=== Personnel ===
Person	Position
Bridget Rowe	Leader
J.M. Greenbough	Nominating Officer
Damian Wilson	Treasurer

== See also ==
- Jens-Peter Bonde
- Declan Ganley
- 2009 European Parliament election
- Treaty of Lisbon
