= Robin Matthews =

Robin Mat(t)hews may refer to:

- Robin Matthews (politician), United Kingdom leader of the European party Libertas
- Robin Matthews (economist) (1927–2010), economist and chess problemist
- Robin Matthews (cricketer) (born 1944), English cricketer
- Robin Mathews (poet) (1931–2023), Canadian poet, professor, and political activist
- Robin Mathews (make-up artist)
- Robin Matthews (Emmerdale), fictional character on ITV soap opera Emmerdale
