= Ballyhea Says No =

Anti-bank bailout protests in Ireland

Ballyhea Says No was a protest movement based in the north County Cork townland and parish of Ballyhea. Each week after 11 AM Sunday Mass, and between Sunday 6 March 2011 (the weekend after the general election that overturned years of Fianna Fáil rule and brought a Fine Gael-Labour coalition to power) and Sunday 8 March 2020 when the final protest march took place, residents protested against the bailout of unidentified bondholders by the Irish state.

A prominent spokesperson for the movement was its founder, sportswriter Diarmuid O'Flynn, creator of the Bondwatch blog in which he documented bank bailout payments as they happened. Among those to have offered their public support for the ideals of the movement were the economists Constantin Gurdgiev and Stephen Kinsella, as well a numerous other public figures.

== History ==
On 1 November 2011, members of the protest movement created a human roadblock on the main Cork-Limerick road against the following day's payment of a US$1 billion Anglo Irish Bank bond. In May 2012, the Fine Gael TD Áine Collins stirred controversy when she claimed at a private meeting with people representing the movement (also her constituents) that she found it difficult to live on €140,000 a year.

On 18 September 2012, the people of Ballyhea arrived at Leinster House in Dublin where they met with Sinn Féin finance spokesperson Pearse Doherty. Independent TDs John Halligan and Luke 'Ming' Flanagan marched along with them through Dublin. On 27 January 2013, the people of Ballyhea held their 100th march.

On 27 March 2013, protestors from Ballyhea and neighbouring Charleville arrived in Brussels to meet members of the European Parliament's Economic and Monetary Affairs committee, including chairman Sharon Bowles. On 2 March 2014, Diarmuid O'Flynn announced at a march to mark the third anniversary of the campaign that he would run as a South constituency candidate in the 2014 European Parliament election.

In addition, marches were held in solidarity throughout Ireland, as far away as Falcarragh in County Donegal.

The final march took place on 8 March 2020.

== Media coverage ==
The persistence of the villagers, who carried a banner each week declaring: "Ballyhea says NO! to bond-holder bailout", led to increased attention from international media. By the 100th week of the event, the protest movement had attracted the attention of international media, including Aftenposten, Al Jazeera and The Washington Post, with camera crews travelling from as far as Australia, France, Germany and Korea. Der Tagesspiegel said that in Ballyhea "beats the heart of the Irish resistance."

The lack of media coverage given to the movement in Ireland itself was noted both at home and abroad, with some publications choosing not to refer to it at all. However, such was the association between this place and the word "no", that it was used when referring to other events relating to Ballyhea.

Michael Clifford wrote that Ballyhea was the "conscience of a nation". Eoghan MacConnell of the Westmeath Independent cited Ballyhea as a fine example of "the people of Ireland tak[ing] to the streets to voice their discontent". Fintan O'Toole wrote in The Irish Times: "Theirs is a dignified, persistent and good-humoured protest against the bailout of bank bondholders that has had such profound consequences for Ireland. Theirs is a voice from an Ireland that is not yet vanquished: an Ireland that values common sense and basic justice." Gene Kerrigan wrote in the Sunday Independent: "When the history of this ignoble little era is written, Ballyhea will be a byword for honour."
