= Letter to the editor =

Letter sent by readers to a publication

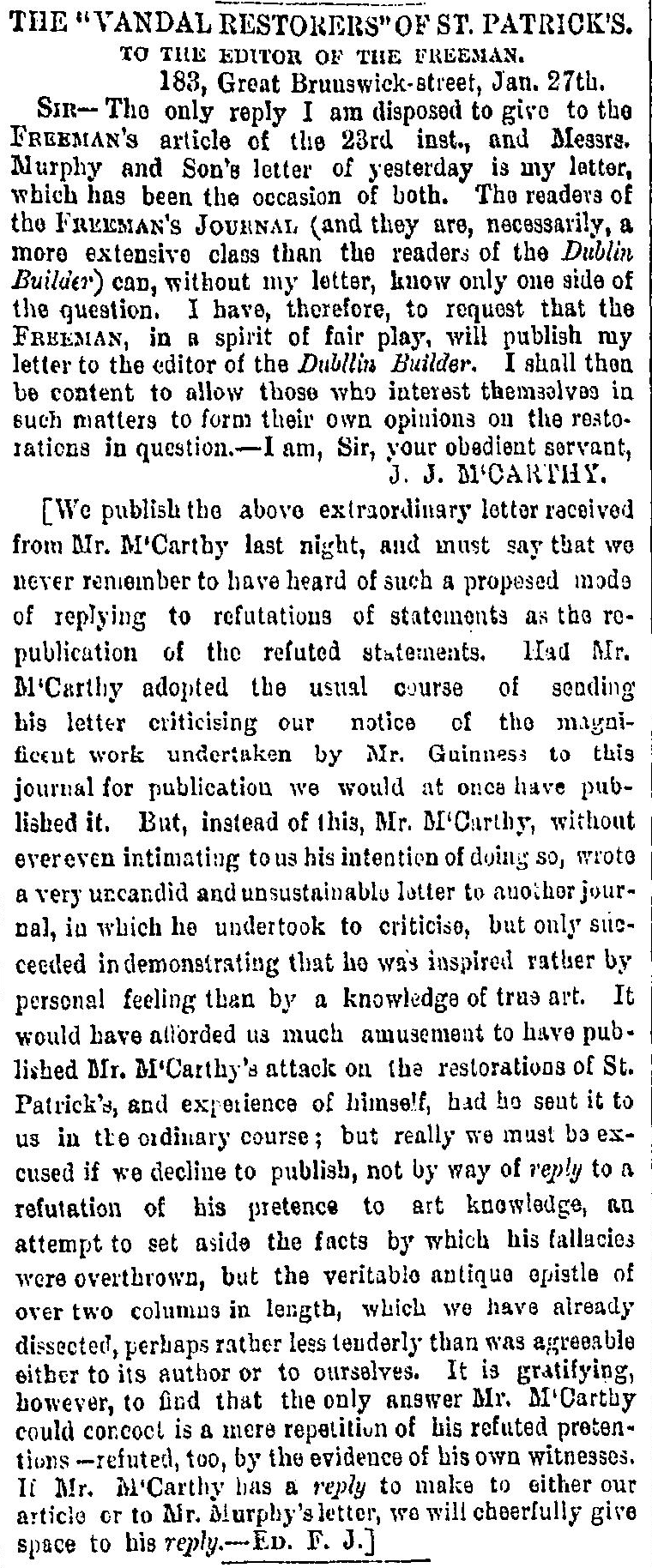
Letter to the editor by J. J. McCarthy, demanding the publication of his letter to the Dublin Builder which was commented upon in the Freeman's Journal, and its response by the editor, John Gray. Published on p. 3 of the Freeman's Journal of 28 January 1863

A letter to the editor (LTE) is a letter sent to a publication about an issue of concern to the reader. Usually, such letters are intended for publication. In many publications, letters to the editor may be sent either through conventional mail or electronic mail.

Letters to the editor are most frequently associated with newspapers and news magazines; however, they are sometimes published in other periodicals such as entertainment and technical magazines and academic journals. Radio and television stations may also receive such letters, which are sometimes read on the air, particularly on news commentary broadcasts or on talk radio. In this presentation form the letter to the editor can also be described as viewer mail or listener mail, depending on the medium.

== Subject matter ==
The subject matter of letters to the editor vary widely. However, the most common topics include:

- Supporting or opposing a stance taken by the publication in its editorial or by a columnist, or responding to another writer's letter to the editor.
- Commenting on a current issue being debated by a governing body – local, regional or national depending on the publication's circulation. Often, the writer will urge elected officials to make their decision based on their viewpoint.
- Commenting on material (such as a news story) that has appeared in a previous edition. Such letters may either be critical or praising.
- Correcting a perceived error or misrepresentation.

== History ==
Letters to the Editor (LTEs) have been a feature of American newspapers since the 18th century. Many of the earliest news reports and commentaries published by early-American newspapers were delivered in the form of letters, and by the mid-18th century, LTEs were a dominant carrier of political and social discourse. Many influential essays about the role of government in matters such as personal freedoms and economic development took the form of letters — consider Cato's Letters or Letters from a Farmer in Pennsylvania, which were widely reprinted in early American newspapers. Through the 19th century, LTEs were increasingly centralized near the editorials of newspapers, so that by the turn of the 20th century LTEs had become permanent fixtures of the opinion pages.

Modern LTE forums differ little from those earlier counterparts. A typical forum will include a half-dozen to a dozen letters (or excerpts from letters). The letters chosen for publication usually are only a sample of the total letters submitted, with larger-circulation publications running a much smaller percentage of submissions and small-circulation publications running nearly all of the relatively few letters they receive. Editors generally read all submissions, but in general most will automatically reject letters that include profanity, libelous statements, personal attacks against individuals or specific organizations, that are unreasonably long (most publications suggest length limits ranging from 200 to 500 words) or that are submitted anonymously.

The latter criterion is a fairly recent development in LTE management. Prior to the Cold War paranoia of the mid-20th century, anonymous LTEs were common; in fact, the right to write anonymously was central to the free-press/free-speech movement (as in the 1735 trial against John Peter Zenger, which started with an anonymous essay). By the 1970s, editors had developed strong negative attitudes toward anonymous letters, and by the end of the 20th century, about 94 percent of newspapers automatically rejected anonymous LTEs. Some newspapers in the 1980s and 1990s created special anonymous opinion forums that allowed people to either record short verbal opinions via telephone (which were then transcribed and published) or send letters that were either unsigned or where the author used a pseudonym. Although many journalists derided the anonymous call-in forums as unethical (for instance, someone could make an unfounded opinion without worry of the consequences or having to back the comment up with hard facts), defenders argued that such forums upheld the free-press tradition of vigorous, uninhibited debate similar to that found in earlier newspapers.

=== Non-print media ===
Although primarily considered a function of print publications, LTEs also are present in electronic media. In broadcast journalism, LTEs have always been a semi-regular feature of 60 Minutes and the news programs of National Public Radio. LTEs also are widespread on the Internet in various forms.

By the early 21st century, the Internet had become a delivery system for many LTEs via e-mail and news websites (in fact, after several envelopes containing a powder suspected to be anthrax were mailed to lawmakers and journalists, several news organizations announced they would only accept e-mail LTEs). Because the Internet broadly expanded the potential readership of editorials and opinion columns at small newspapers, their controversial editorials or columns could sometimes attract much more e-mail than they were used to handling — so much so that a few newspapers had their e-mail servers crash.

== Considerations ==
Editors are a frequent target of letter-writing campaigns, also called "astroturfing", or "fake grass-roots" operations where sample letters are distributed on the Internet or otherwise, to be copied or rewritten and submitted as personal letters.

Although LTE management gets little attention in trade journals, one organization, the National Conference of Editorial Writers, often includes essays on LTE management in its newsletter, The Masthead, and at its annual meetings. Among the NCEW's strongest champions for LTEs was Ronald D. Clark of the St. Paul Pioneer Press, who wrote, "Consider letters as a barometer of how well (you are) engaging readers or viewers. The more you receive, the more you're connecting. The fewer you receive, the stronger the sign that you're putting the masses to sleep."

On the other hand, many editors will allow the publication of anonymous letters where the details of name and address of the author are not printed, but are disclosed to the editor. This can promote a debate of issues that are personal, contentious or embarrassing, yet are of importance to raise in a public debate.

Sometimes a letter to the editor in a local newspaper, such as the "Dear IRS" letter written by Ed Barnett to the Wichita Falls Times Record News in Wichita Falls, Texas, will end up receiving attention from the national media.

== Academic ==
In academic publishing, letters to the editor of an academic journal are usually open postpublication reviews of a paper, often critical of some aspect of the original paper. The authors of the original paper sometimes respond to these with a letter of their own. Controversial papers in mainstream journals often attract numerous letters to the editor. Good citation indexing services list the original papers together with all replies. Depending on the length of the letter and the journal's style, other types of headings may be used, such as peer commentary. There are some variations on this practice. Some journals request open commentaries as a matter of course, which are published together with the original paper, and any authors' reply, in a process called open peer commentary. The introduction of the "epub ahead of print" practice in many journals now allows unsolicited letters to the editor (and authors' reply) to appear in the same print issue of the journal, as long as they are sent in the interval between the electronic publication of the original paper and its appearance in print.

== Misrepresentation ==
Submitting a letter under a false name to shill in support or to criticize an opponent can have significant consequences. For example, Canadian politician Paul Reitsma's career ended in scandal in 1999, after he signed letters addressed to newspapers as "Warren Betanko" praising himself and attacking his political opponents. His local paper wrote a front-page story under the headline of "MLA Reitsma is a liar and we can prove it". The revelation led to a recall campaign that built up steam, but Reitsma resigned the day before the formal recall election could take place. He is the only modern Canadian politician to be forced from office due to a recall campaign.

In 1966 Israel, the Herut Party of then opposition leader Menachem Begin was shaken by scandal when letters sharply attacking Begin, which had been published in major dailies, were proven to have been authored by Begin's rivals for the party leadership and sent to the papers under various aliases and false names. As a result, the rivals were discredited and eventually expelled from the party, which helped buttress Begin's leadership position up to win the 1977 general elections and become Prime Minister of Israel.

== See also ==
- Open letter
- Comic book letter column
- Disgusted of Tunbridge Wells
- Op-ed
