= Edith Clampton =

Pseudonymous letter writer to the Bangkok Post

Mrs. Edith Clampton was a pseudonymous writer to the "Post Bag" (the letters to the editor section) of the Thai English newspaper, the Bangkok Post. Because of her frequent, comedically opinionated and often bizarre letters she came to be identified with the paper's letters page.

She first appeared in the early 1990s and continued contributing on a casual basis until 1996. She was portrayed as an upper-class conservative expatriate of uncertain nationality, with two servants: her maid "Khun Hazel" and her driver "Khun Parker". Her regular appearances kept Post Bag pages topical and controversial. A collection of her letters and replies was published by the newspaper in 1996. Although the editorial staff of the newspaper were made aware of the true identity of Clampton so that they could avoid publishing any forgeries, the creator of the pen name remains a secret.

== See also ==
- Disgusted of Tunbridge Wells
