= Rivada Port Graham Solutions =

Communications services company and U.S. federal contractor

Rivada Port Graham Solutions, also known as RPGS, is an SBA-certified small business. RPGS is a joint venture between Port Graham Development Corporation and Rivada Networks. Established in 2004, RPGS specializes in the engineering, design and implementation of communications systems for the US Department of Homeland security and other public safety agencies.

== Operations ==
In April 2012, Rivada Port Graham Solutions was one of 30 prime contractors awarded a contract on the US Secret Service's $3 billion Tactical Communications (TACCOM) contract for the US Department of Homeland Security. Contractors received contracts in one or multiple technical categories, and each indefinite delivery, indefinite quantity (IDIQ) contract has a 2-year base and three 1-year options. The TACCOM contract has the following five technical categories.

Technical Category 1: Subscriber Base - Portable/mobile radios, control/base stations, software, upgrades, etc.
Technical Category 2: Infrastructure - Repeaters, routers, comparator systems, OTAR, etc.
Technical Category 3: Infrastructure Services - Engineering, design, installation, etc.
Technical Category 4: O&M Services - Maintenance, frequency managers, spectrum managers, etc.
Technical Category 5: Test Equipment

RPGS is authorized to provide services under Technical Category 3 (Infrastructure Services) and Technical Category 4 (Operations and Maintenance Services).

In December 2012, US Customs and Border Protection awarded RPGS a task order under the TACCOM contract for the modernization of communications infrastructure and equipment across 17 US states and territories.
