= Declan Ganley =

Irish businessman, entrepreneur, and activist

Leader of Libertas
- In office 30 October 2008 – 12 September 2010
- Preceded by: New office
- Succeeded by: Office abolished

Personal details
- Born: Declan James Ganley; 23 July 1968 (age 58) Watford, United Kingdom
- Party: Independent
- Other political affiliations: Libertas (2008–2010)
- Spouse: Delia Mary Paterek (m. 1993)
- Children: 4

Military service
- Branch/service: Army Reserve

Declan James Ganley (born 23 July 1968) is an English-born Irish entrepreneur, businessman, and political activist. He was the founder and leader of the Irish branch of the eurosceptic Libertas Party.

Primarily a telecommunications entrepreneur, Ganley has built businesses across the European Union, Russia and latterly, the United States. Notably, he co-founded Broadnet, a company which rolled out internet and telecoms services across the European Union in the late 1990s. In 1999, after the award of 42 German licences to Broadnet, the Irish Independent valued Broadnet at $875m. Ganley later sold his shares to Comcast for an undisclosed sum.

As of 2022, he is the chairman and CEO of Rivada Networks, a telecommunications company specialising in the use and arbitrage of wireless spectrum. Rivada has patented technologies in the field of dynamic spectrum arbitrage. In 2013, Ganley testified that Rivada's patents had the potential to "save the taxpayer hundreds of millions of dollars". He founded and sold companies in forestry and the online sector.

During the 2008 Irish referendum on the Treaty of Lisbon, Ganley and the Libertas Institute successfully campaigned for a "No" vote, which was overturned in a second referendum. He campaigned for a "No" vote in the 2012 Irish European Fiscal Compact referendum. He has guest-presented Tonight with Vincent Browne.

In 2009, Ganley founded and became chairman of Libertas, a political party with pan-European ambitions. The party was unsuccessful in the 2009 European Parliament Election, succeeding in getting only one candidate elected, in France. Ganley was upbeat after the defeat, describing the venture as a failed experiment.

== Early life ==
Ganley was born in Watford, Hertfordshire, to Irish emigrant parents. He returned to Ireland with his parents to live in Glenamaddy, County Galway, at the age of 13. After leaving school in 1987, Ganley has been involved in business ventures selling Russian aluminium, and in the Latvian forestry sector.

In the early 1990s, Ganley founded Kipelova Forestry Enterprises, which became one of the largest forestry companies in the Russian Federation. Ganley sold the company in 1997. In 1996, his company Ganley International founded the Anglo-Adriatic Investment Fund, an Albanian financial fund formed to collect and invest privatisation vouchers. Following political upheaval and several changes of government, the Albanian government ceased its planned privatisation programmes, and the fund became dormant. He formed a company called Liberty Mobile that made two unsuccessful bids, in partnership with Qualcomm, to obtain mobile telecoms operator licences in Iraq from the Coalition Provisional Authority.

Ganley has investments in joint ventures with Nana Pacific, an Alaska Native Regional Corporations with special US Government contracting access. This joint venture was structured with the help of business partners Jack Shaw and Don DeMarino. The partnership eventually led to the creation of Ganley's current company, Rivada Networks, and the joint venture company Rivada Pacific formed 49%/51% with Nana Pacific.

== Business life ==
Ganley received the Louisiana Distinguished Service Medal for his work during Hurricane Katrina, where Rivada's emergency deployable communications systems were credited by state and federal officials with dramatically improving communications between emergency response organisations, and saving countless lives.

Ganley served as the chairman on the Forum on Public Safety in Europe & North America, 2005–2006. He was an advisor on "technology and terrorism" to the Club De Madrid. In 2008, Ganley accepted the Czech Republic's Michal Tosovsky Prize on behalf of the Irish electorate. He has been an occasional analyst on CNBC's Squawk Box Europe. He has made occasional TV appearances and radio broadcasts in Ireland, occasionally with partner Constantin Gurdgiev.

As of 2022, he is the CEO and chairman of Rivada Networks, a US-based firm specialising in the provision of telecommunications systems to the military, police and emergency services in disaster situations.

Ganley has written about the future of mobile spectrum and bandwidth for the Sunday Independent.

On 14 March 2013, Ganley represented Rivada Networks in testimony to the US House of Representatives Committee on Energy and Commerce, Subcommittee on Communications and Technology, for the hearing entitled "Oversight of FirstNet and Emergency Communications".

In May 2011, Ganley set up a Swiss finance fund, St. Columbanus AG, along with businessmen Constantin Gurdgiev and Andrew Jamieson, which was billed as a "safe haven" for Irish funds from European banks.

In March 2022, Ganley launched Rivada Space Networks GmbH, a wholly owned subsidiary of Rivada Networks that plans to launch 600 low Earth orbit satellites interconnected with laser links to form a single global mesh network in space, termed the "Outernet". Ganley dismissed concerns about an oversupply of low Earth orbit satellites and the problems associated with space debris.

In 2024, Ganley was threatened with jail time or a fine for failing to appear before a New York court in relation to payments that were to be made to David Shuman, a shareholder in Rivada Networks.

== Political life ==
=== Views on the European Union ===
Ganley advocates a Federal Europe, with directly elected office holders representing the people and holding the currently unelected EU Commission to account.

=== Views on abortion ===
Ganley has described himself as "avowedly pro-life", and actively supports anti-abortion causes in Ireland. In July 2013, he spoke at the Dublin Rally for Life.

In 2018, Ganley actively and unsuccessfully campaigned for a "No" vote in that year's abortion referendum.

=== Libertas ===
Ganley was the founder and chairman of Libertas, a short-lived European political party, and was a candidate for Libertas in the 2009 European Parliament election in North-West Ireland. Libertas started in 2006 as a lobby group campaigning for a No-vote to the Lisbon Treaty in the Irish Referendum 12 June 2008, and evolved into a pan-European political movement. Libertas ran candidates in 20 European countries for the 2009 European Parliament election. In Rome, on 1 May 2009, Libertas held its first Party Congress. Libertas's political policies called for greater levels of democracy, transparency, and accountability within the EU, as well as a twenty-five-page alternative to the Lisbon Treaty. Libertas was revealed to have spent over €5.6 million on campaigning against passage of the Lisbon Treaty in its second referendum, which led Minister of State for European Affairs Dick Roche to state that Libertas were not transparent about their spending on campaigning against the Lisbon Treaty.

The origin of the Party's funding has been questioned. Ganley revealed that he personally loaned the party €200,000 for the Lisbon Treaty Campaign. In 2008, the European Union was reported to ask US Congress about Libertas funding. Gay Mitchell, Irish MEP, questioned whether the Libertas's €1.3 million budget was backed by the CIA or the US military - a claim Ganley and many others openly mocked. Ganley has never provided exact details on the source of funding.

In May 2009, Irish public broadcaster RTÉ ran a Prime Time profile of Ganley. In response, he stated he would launch "significant and extensive legal action against RTÉ and Prime Time". Ganley began legal proceedings in December 2011. An opinion piece published by Bruce Arnold in the Irish Independent claimed Ganley was the victim of a government organised smear campaign.

In 2020, Ganley settled the case with RTE for an undisclosed sum, which he said was "substantial", and RTE issued an apology.

In May 2009, Arnold produced a 156-page book with Ganley, and 100,000 copies in various languages were to be subsequently distributed across Europe by Ganley.

In January 2013, Ganley received an apology and a nominal €50 donation to a charity in an out of court settlement over a defamatory Twitter comment made about him. That same month, he agreed to pay expenses of failed Libertas candidate Raymond O'Malley.

=== Candidacy to the European Parliament ===
On 14 March 2009, at a press interview Ganley announced his candidacy for the European Parliament, for Libertas in the North-West constituency. Until 1 May 2009, Ganley travelled all over Europe to campaign against the Lisbon Treaty, and helped local Libertas branches. On 1 May 2009, Libertas held its first Party Congress and afterwards he focused his campaign on the North-West constituency, canvassing, attending public speeches and debates and appearing on radio and TV. One week after he launched his election campaign, incumbent MEP Jim Higgins branded Ganley a "puppet of the US military". In a pre-election opinion poll Ganley polled 9% of first preference votes in the North-West Constituency. On 8 June 2009, Ganley polled over 13% but did not gain a seat in the European Parliament. Ganley then announced his withdrawal from politics.

=== Second Lisbon Treaty referendum ===
In September 2009, Ganley announced he would campaign against the second referendum to ratify the Lisbon Treaty. He took part in a televised debate, where he argued with the head of Ryanair, Michael O'Leary, who was campaigning in favour of the treaty.

== Personal life ==
As of 2010, Ganley lived in Abbeyknockmoy, Galway with his American-born wife, Delia Mary Ganley (née Paterek) and their four children, on a 40-acre Moyne Park Mansion, previously home to Scottish folk singer Donovan.

He served for more than two decades in the Irish Army Reserve, as a gunner with the 54th Reserve Field Artillery Regiment.

== See also ==
- Broadnet Holdings BV
- Anglo Adriatic Investment Fund SA
- Adornis.com
