= Irish Creamery Milk Suppliers Association =

Irish agricultural lobbying organisation

Irish Creamery Milk Suppliers Association (ICMSA)
- Founded: 1950
- Headquarters: John Feely House; Dublin Road; Limerick; V94 KX38
- Region served: Ireland
- Members: 18,000
- Key people: Denis Drennan (president); John Enright (general secretary)
- Website: icmsa.ie

The Irish Creamery Milk Suppliers Association (ICMSA) is an agricultural lobbying organisation for farmers in Ireland. It was formed in 1950 to represent dairy farmers but broadened its remit to include all farmers.

== Organisation ==
The ICMSA promotes the interests of farmers, especially dairy and livestock farmers, by lobbying at local, national and European Union (EU) levels. It works to defend the rights and incomes of farm families and advises on the protection and regulation of agriculture in Ireland.

The organisation works on many committees and bodies such as Teagasc, Ornua, Bord Bia, the National Dairy Council, the Employment Appeals Tribunal, and the Monitoring Committees on Rural Development. Because the members are farmers working in the field, the ICMSA focuses mainly on the challenges encountered at farm level.

At European level, the ICMSA meets with Members of the European Parliament, European Commission officials, and the Irish minister responsible for EU policy proposals. It publish papers and press releases on EU policies.

As of December 2025, the president of the ICMSA was Denis Drennan, and the general secretary was John Enright. There are 18,000 members.

== History ==
The organisation was founded in Nenagh, County Tipperary in July 1950 following a government announcement that payments to farmers for milk were to be reduced. As the ICMSA grew, and recognising the needs of farmers nationally, it decided to include other types of agriculture in the organisation.
