= Adornis.com =

Online jewelry retailer

- Formation: 1999
- Type: Online jewelry retailer
- Headquarters: Ireland: Moyne Park, Tuam, County Galway, Ireland; US: Suite 265, 411 West Putnam Avenue, Greenwich, Connecticut 06830, US
- Location(s): Ireland; United States
- Official language: English
- Founder: Declan Ganley
- Key people: Sean Ganley, Jeanne Daniels, Roy Albers, Marion Davidson
- Website: www.adornis.com

Adornis.com was an online jewelry retailer created during the 1990s dot-com boom that later collapsed.

== Origin ==
Adornis.com, Inc. was an online jewelry retailer launched by Irish entrepreneur Declan Ganley with co-founder Sean Ganley, brother of Declan, in 1999, part of the dot-com boom of the 1990s. The company was funded through Ganley's private equity firm, the Ganley Group, with $30m in equity funding, $30m in debt financing and a personal investment by Ganley of $5.5m. The French investments firm Richemont Investments SA, (a division of Compagnie Financiere Richemont AG) paid approx $5m to own 20% and the Irish internet firm Nua Internet Services owned 10%. Ganley owned around 40%, with the remainder owned by three American hedge funds. Adornis.com was a winner of Forbes magazine's 'Best of the Web' "Classic, contemporary and estate jewelry from less than $100 to more than $10,000. Browse or search by designer, product type, type of material and gemstone or price....Excellent product descriptions and multiple close-up views". Time magazine described Adornis.com as "bauble central for luxury items" in December 1999.

== Fate ==
It was valued at $25 million at one point but collapsed and its stock was sold off to Overstock.com for about $2m. The remains were converted to Adornis.com Limited, founded on 7 September 2001. That company's latest annual return was filed on 31 December 2005.
