= Broadnet Holdings BV =

- Company type: Private
- Industry: Telecommunications
- Founded: 1998
- Fate: No longer operating
- Headquarters: Brussels, Belgium
- Area served: Germany, France, Spain, Portugal, Norway, Czech Republic
- Key people: Robert Condon; Declan Ganley; Ryan Wren (CEO); Joseph J. Euteneuer (CFO)
- Owner: Comcast Corporation, European Telcom Holdings
- Website: www.broadnet.net (defunct)

Broadnet Holdings BV ("Broadnet") was the holding company of the Broadnet group of companies with its headquarters in Brussels, Belgium. Broadnet assembled a portfolio of national wireless broadband internet licences in Europe in the late 1990s and early 2000s. The company offered its services to SME and Enterprise markets.

== Beginnings ==
The genesis of Broadnet dates back to 1996, when Robert Condon and Declan Ganley began purchasing wireless spectrum licences through their company European Telecoms Holdings. In 1998, Comcast Corporation made a substantial investment in the company and Broadnet Holdings BV was formed. Following the Comcast investment, Comcast owned 62.5% of the firm and European Telcoms Holdings (controlled by Condon and Ganley) owned the remaining 37.5%.

== Technology ==
The company provided wireless broadband internet services using wireless spectrum in the 3.5 GHz and 28 GHz frequency band. The company deployed advanced wireless network systems manufactured by Lucent and Alcatel to establish point-to-point and point-to-multi-point wireless systems in major cities throughout Europe.

== Licence Acquisition ==
By 2000 Broadnet had obtained spectrum licences in the UK, Germany, France, Austria, Switzerland, the Czech Republic, Spain, Portugal and Norway.

Broadnet established companies in other countries for the purpose of bidding for licences, but it was not always successful. Broadnet bid for a licence in Ireland but was beaten by Eircom. Broadnet sued the telecoms regulator that awarded the licences, but settled.

== Operations ==
Broadnet launched operations in Germany, France, Spain, Portugal, Norway and the Czech Republic. Some other markets had network infrastructure for regulatory purposes, but were never commercially launched.

== Purchase by Comcast ==
At its peak Broadnet was valued at $1bn. The Company considered raising around $1bn to roll out broadband services across Europe, via a flotation or private placing, but did not do so. Comcast bought out European Telcoms' Holding's Share to become the sole owner. Subsequently, Condon and Ganley sold their holdings to Comcast.

== See also ==
- Declan Ganley
- Comcast
