= Tunbridge Wells (play) =

1678 play

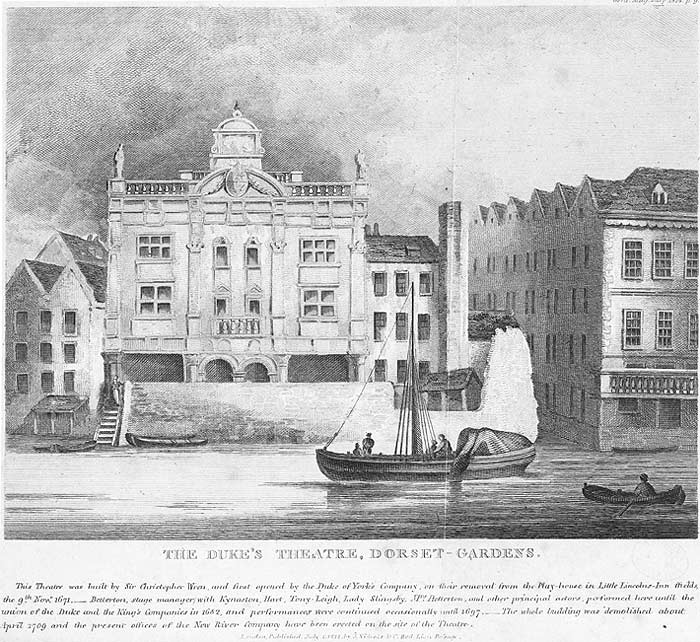
- The play premiered at the Dorset Gardens Theatre
- Original language: English
- Written by: Thomas Rawlins
- Genre: Restoration comedy
- Setting: Tunbridge Wells, present day

Premiere
- Date: March 1678
- Place: Dorset Garden Theatre, London

Tunbridge Wells; Or, A Day's Courtship is a 1678 comedy play generally attributed to the English writer Thomas Rawlins. It was originally staged at the Dorset Garden Theatre in London by the Duke's Company. The names of the original actors are not known. It did not enjoy the same success as Rawlins' earlier work Tom Essence.

It takes place in the spa town Tunbridge Wells. There, a man-about-town, Owmuch, sets up a couple of London prostitutes posing as a rich widow and her maid, in the hope of collecting the courtship gifts offer by gentleman suitors. However, he sees a larger scam in tricking a foppish and idiotic baronet, Sir Lofty Vainman, into marrying her.

== Bibliography ==
- Canfield, J. Douglas. Tricksters and Estates: On the Ideology of Restoration Comedy. University Press of Kentucky, 2014.
- Hembry, Phyllis May . The English Spa, 1560-1815: A Social History. Fairleigh Dickinson Univ Press, 1990.
- Van Lennep, W. The London Stage, 1660-1800: Volume One, 1660-1700. Southern Illinois University Press, 1960.
