= European Movement Ireland =

- European Movement Ireland Logo
- Formation: 11 January 1954
- Type: Not-for-Profit
- Legal status: Company Limited by Guarantee
- Purpose: Educational
- Headquarters: Dublin, Ireland
- Region served: Ireland
- Members: Individuals, Student, Public Representatives and Corporates
- CEO: Noelle O Connell
- Chair of the Board: Julie Sinnamon
- Parent organization: European Movement International
- Website: www.europeanmovement.ie

European Movement Ireland (EM Ireland) (Irish: Gluaiseacht na hEorpa in Éirinn) is an independent not-for-profit organisation that campaigns for every Irish person to get involved in the European Union and by doing so, help shape it. It is the oldest Irish organisation dealing with the EU, pre-dating Ireland's membership of the EEC in 1973 by almost twenty years. The organisation is headed by CEO, David Geary. Julie Sinnamon acts as Chair of the EM Ireland Board.

== History ==
On 11 January 1954, one hundred people met in the Shelbourne Hotel in Dublin and founded the Irish Council of the European Movement. Signing the Articles of Association that founded the European Movement were seven pioneers of Ireland's future in Europe. They were: Donal O'Sullivan, university lecturer; Garret Fitzgerald, economist; Louis P F Smith, economist; Denis Corboy, barrister-at-Law; George Colley, solicitor; Declan Costello, barrister-at-Law; and Sean J Healy, secretary.

These seven signatories laid the first stone paving Ireland's way to full membership of the EU. The aim of the Irish Council was to inform Irish individuals and organisations about the EU. One of its primary objectives was for Ireland to gain membership of the European Communities (EC) (principally the European Economic Community (EEC), as the EU was then known). Former Taoisigh Garret Fitzgerald and Jack Lynch, and former President Mary Robinson backed the initiative and after a referendum was held on the Third Amendment of the Irish Constitution which was overwhelmingly approved by voters in May 1972 Ireland joined the European Communities as a full member state on 1 January 1973.

The Irish Council later became European Movement Ireland. Today the organisation claims to act as source of information for Irish citizens regarding the work of the EU and its stated aim is to promote reasoned robust and fair debate about EU in Ireland.

It retains an affiliation with the European Youth Parliament, a youth organization which runs events for secondary school age children along the structure of a mock European Parliament.

== European Movement International ==
European Movement Ireland is part of a pan-European network. European Movement International is a lobbying association that coordinates the efforts of associations and national councils with the goal of promoting European integration, and disseminating information about it. It seeks to encourage and facilitate the active participation of citizens and civil society organisations in the European Union as it develops. The European Movement network is represented in over 41 countries and has over 20 international organisations as members. The current President of European Movement is outgoing MEP Guy Verhofstadt. For a full list of all European Movement offices, and an outline of the history of the international network visit the EM International website at http://www.europeanmovement.eu/
