= Disgusted of Tunbridge Wells =

Generic name for conservative letter writer in moral outrage

The phrase "Disgusted of Tunbridge Wells" is a generic name used in the United Kingdom for a person with strongly conservative political views who writes letters to newspapers or the BBC in moral outrage. Disgusted is the pseudonym of the supposed letter writer, who is a resident of the stereotypically middle-class town of Royal Tunbridge Wells, Kent, in southeast England. The term may have originated with either the 1944 BBC radio programme Much-Binding-in-the-Marsh, a regular writer to The Times or an editor of the letters page of a local newspaper, the Tunbridge Wells Advertiser.

In later times, the term has continued to be used to describe conservative letter writers who complain to newspapers about a subject that they morally or personally disagree with. It is often used in relation to news stories regarding Royal Tunbridge Wells. Some residents of the town have criticised the term as obsolete, but others continue to embrace it.

== Origins ==
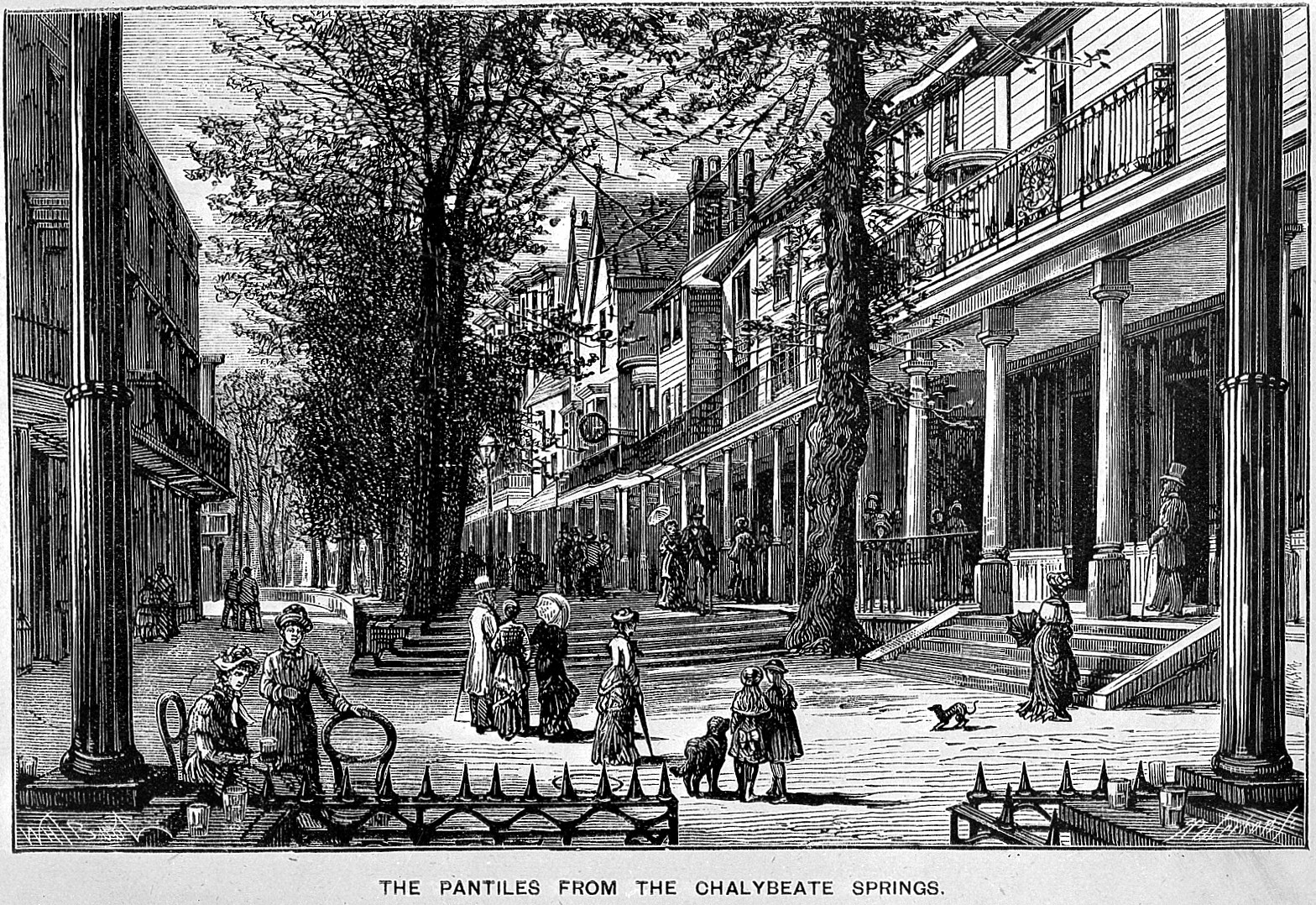
Royal Tunbridge Wells

A "stuffy, reactionary image" was associated with the town of Tunbridge Wells by the novelist E. M. Forster in his 1908 book A Room with a View, in which the character Charlotte Bartlett says, "I am used to Tunbridge Wells, where we are all hopelessly behind the times". Tunbridge Wells was later granted a royal charter by King Edward VII in 1909 and renamed "Royal Tunbridge Wells".

The BBC radio show Much-Binding-in-the-Marsh, first broadcast in 1944, is sometimes stated in newspaper reports to have popularised the term Disgusted of Tunbridge Wells for correspondence to newspapers. There were also suggestions that the use of Disgusted of Tunbridge Wells came from one regular contributor of letters to The Times in the early 20th century, who would use a particular style of writing to oppose people and organisations who came to his attention. Despite being described as the "quintessential Englishman" because of his writing style and having his letters regularly published, his identity was never known because he would only identify himself as "Disgusted of Tunbridge Wells". However, some reports have popularly rumoured that this person was a retired colonel who served in the British Indian Army during the British Raj. In 2014, the Kent and Sussex Courier claimed that the originator of Disgusted of Tunbridge Wells was the retired British Army colonel George Thomas Howe, who had developed a skill in writing letters about apartheid during five years in the Union of South Africa. Reportedly, his letters were popular reading and helped to sell newspapers that published them.

According to the Royal Tunbridge Wells historian and former newspaper editor Frank Chapman, the phrase has a different origin, starting in the 1950s with the staff of the former Tunbridge Wells Advertiser. During the paper's final months of publication, the editor Nigel Chapman, alarmed at a lack of letters from readers, insisted his staff write a few to fill space. One signed his simply "Disgusted, Tunbridge Wells", and this was then adopted in all future staff letters until the newspaper ceased publication in 1954. The term Disgusted of Tunbridge Wells was later used to stereotype Royal Tunbridge Wells as a town of retired British Army colonels who would write such letters to newspapers.

Examples of letters of this type sent to the Advertiser may be found which pre-date these origins, such as the following from 1924:

SIR – Being present at the unveiling of the plaque on Thursday last week on the Pantiles, I was surprised when the National Anthem was played to see that in a place like Tunbridge Wells, which is noted for its loyalty and calls itself "Royal", there should be people who refused to remove their hats. Are such people Communists? If they are, Tunbridge Wells should be no place for such as they. We can do without them.

Letters written with a tone of incensed moral outrage have become commonly described as "Disgusted of Tunbridge Wells" letters, even though the writer may not be from Royal Tunbridge Wells. For example, the actor Michael Caine once said: "I don't want to sound like Disgusted of Tunbridge Wells, but I do think there should be some sort of national service for young men". People writing them have been claimed by commentators to be readers of the Daily Mail, despite the original letters not originating in that publication.

== Later use ==
The magazine Private Eye made regular use of the Disgusted of Tunbridge Wells pseudonym to satirise the stereotypical conservative Middle Englander, and it became a running joke for several years. In 1978, BBC Radio 4 called its new listener feedback programme Disgusted, Tunbridge Wells, though it was renamed Feedback in 1979. This was following Radio 4 broadcasting the Take It From Here radio series in 1954 where "Disgusted of Tunbridge Wells" was prominently featured. In politics, the people behind "Disgusted of Tunbridge Wells" letters have strong conservative views and are commonly viewed to support the Conservative Party. However, most UK Independence Party (UKIP) members in the party's early days were viewed by commentators as being "'Disgusted of Tunbridge Wells' pensioners", of whom the UKIP leader Nigel Farage stated in 2013 "... the people in it [UKIP] and who voted for it were in the main 'Disgusted of Tunbridge Wells'. I mean, you look down the membership list in 1994, anyone below a half colonel was a nobody..."

In 1980, the BBC Radio 2 broadcaster Terry Wogan chaired an "It's Your BBC" meeting at Royal Tunbridge Wells' Assembly Hall Theatre. A report in The Times suggested the BBC had staged the meeting in the town in the hope that "Disgusted" would reveal himself.

In 2006, the author and magistrate Connie St Louis singled out the "disgusted of Tunbridge Wells" stereotype as a powerful British middle-class movement, saying "they are part of the group with the same concerns, so they have a sense of belonging".

In 2013, Nigel Cawthorne published Outraged of Tunbridge Wells, a compilation of letters to the Tunbridge Wells Advertiser that were viewed as being in the style of "Disgusted of Tunbridge Wells" from the British Library archives. Critical review of the book has stated that the "Disgusted of Tunbridge Wells" style displayed an art of letter writing that has continued despite other things in the world changing.

Residents of Royal Tunbridge Wells have also expressed displeasure in a manner similar to the "Disgusted of Tunbridge Wells" stereotype in relation to the Waitrose supermarket chain refusing to open a store in the town while neighbouring "downmarket" towns of Tonbridge and Crowborough both did have one.

In 2016, during the United Kingdom referendum on the British membership in the European Union, The New York Times used Royal Tunbridge Wells as its base for reporting on the referendum. The town was chosen because it was seen as the "quintessentially English town" due to the Disgusted of Tunbridge Wells phrase. Although most Americans would not fully understand the reference, the town was nonetheless considered a symbol of middle England. The town was a Conservative stronghold and was the only council area in Kent to vote by a majority for Remain during Brexit.

== Criticism ==
In 2009, some residents of Royal Tunbridge Wells called the tag "inappropriate" and "stereotypical" and asked the town to drop association with it in favour of Delighted of Tunbridge Wells. However, there was opposition to this campaign by other residents, some of whom wrote to newspapers in the "Disgusted of Tunbridge Wells" style arguing they preferred Disgusted of Tunbridge Wells. Local merchants at the town's information centre pointed out that tourists were buying twice as many goods bearing Disgusted of Tunbridge Wells than with Delighted of Tunbridge Wells.

== See also ==
- Edith Clampton, a pseudonymous comedic letter-writer to the Bangkok Post
- Colonel Blimp
- Down with this sort of thing
- Gammon (insult)
- Keith Flett, a noted writer of letters to British newspapers
- Monty Python's Flying Circus, which featured numerous segments satirizing angry letters to the BBC
- Sir Bufton Tufton, a recurring character in the UK satirical magazine Private Eye
- Placeholder name
- "Will it play in Peoria?"
- Points of View, a show where letters to the BBC would be read out.
