= Anglo Adriatic Investment Fund =

Anglo Adriatic Investment Fund SA
- Formation: 1996?
- Type: Investment fund
- Headquarters: Hotel Rogner Europa Park, Blvd. Deshmoret e Kombit, Tirana, Albania. 128 Mount Street, London, W1Y 5HA, United Kingdom
- Location(s): Albania; United Kingdom
- Official language: English, Albanian
- Founder: Declan Ganley
- Key people: Liam Lawlor, (consultant) Kosta Trebicka, Dan De Marino, Gary Hunter
- Website: n/a

The Anglo Adriatic Investment Fund SA was an investment fund set up to hold privatisation vouchers issued by the government of post-Communist Albania. It was unsuccessful in its attempts to reinvest them and collapsed.

== Structure ==
The Anglo Adriatic Investment Fund SA (AAIF) was established by Irish entrepreneur Declan Ganley. AAIF was the first foreign-managed investment fund in Albania, provisionally licensed on 13 April 1996 and definitively licensed on 22 May 1996. AAIF collected privatisation vouchers that the government of post-communist Albania was giving to Albanians, and it used the nominal value of those vouchers for investment in areas such as fertilizer, breweries, cement and pharmaceuticals. The Albanians who deposited their vouchers with AAIF received shares in the fund in return.

== Early success ==
At one point the fund had 450,000 shareholders and vouchers with a nominal value of more than $120 million.

== Collapse ==
But AAIF had collected too many vouchers: it had 12% of all the vouchers and privatisation leks combined, more than the 10% maximum prescribed by law. (Note: Law No. 7979, entitled "On Investment Funds", dated 26.07.95, see for source) Following a lengthy period of negotiation and accusation between AAIF and the Albanian government, AAIF was left unable to continue with the privatisation. Even worse, the market value of the vouchers had dropped during the collapse of the Albanian economy from 25.6% of their nominal value in January 1996 to 1.7% in October 1998. AAIF was bankrupt.

== Funding ==
AAIF was officially funded by Ganley International, with a 10% stake taken by the US-based Rothschild Emerging Markets Fund. Der Spiegel stated that AAIF's UK office (128 Mount Street, London, W1Y 5HA) shared an address with the European branch of US investment fund Paladin Capital, and also stated that Paladin Capital's advisory board was chaired by former CIA director James Woolsey. Ganley denies any involvement with the CIA.

== See also ==
- 1997 rebellion in Albania
- Declan Ganley
