= Robin Matthews (politician) =

British politician

Robin Matthews was the leader of the Great Britain branch of the European party Libertas, which fought all 72 British seats in the June 2009 European Parliament election. He stood as a candidate for South West England.

Matthews, a former lieutenant colonel in the Light Dragoons regiment of the British Army, has served in Cyprus, Bosnia, Sierra Leone, Iraq and Afghanistan. He retired from the army in 2008 after 20 years of service. Latterly, he became a strategic communications advisor in Afghanistan where he also acted as spokesman for the British Forces.
