= Rivada Networks =

US-based communications technology business

- Type: Privately held company
- Industry: Telecommunication Satellite Internet
- Founder: Declan Ganley
- Headquarters: Washington DC
- Number of locations: 4
- Area served: North America Europe
- Key people: Declan Ganley (Chairman and CEO)
- Subsidiaries: Rivada Space Networks
- Website: https://www.rivada.com/

Rivada Networks is a US-based communications technology business with offices in the US and Ireland. Rivada Networks was founded on July 6, 2004 and its current CEO and chairman is Irish businessman Declan Ganley. Rivada Networks is financially backed by Peter Thiel. An October 20, 2020, CNN report said that the White House had allegedly increased pressure to fast track a contract to lease the Department of Defense's underutilized spectrum in a public private partnership between the DoD and Rivada Networks, to use DoD's mid-band spectrum to eventually share 5G airwaves with wireless providers. Karl Rove, who is a paid lobbyist for Rivada, and Newt Gingrich have been lobbying since early 2019 for the DoD/Rivada deal which CNN says, would be "premium real estate for the booming and lucrative 5G market." Rivada says that is "not interested in a nationalized 5G network."

== History ==
The name Rivada is derived from the acronym, "Radio Interoperable Voice and Data Applications."

Rivada Networks is part of a joint venture with Port Graham Development Corporation called Rivada Port Graham Solutions. In April 2012, Rivada Port Graham Solutions was one of 30 prime contractors awarded a contract on the US Secret Service's $3 billion Tactical Communications (TACCOM) contract for the US Department of Homeland Security. Contractors received contracts in one or multiple technical categories, and each indefinite delivery, indefinite quantity (IDIQ) contract has a 2-year base and three 1-year options. Some of the technical categories on the contract include portable/mobile radios, control/base stations, software, upgrades, repeaters, routers, comparator systems, engineering, design, installations, maintenance, frequency managers, spectrum managers and test equipment.

== Partnerships ==
In May 2016, it was reported that Rivada Networks had partnered with Harris Corporation, Ericsson, Nokia, Intel Security, Fujitsu Network Communications, and Black & Veatch to form Rivada Mercury. Rivada Mercury unsuccessfully bid to build a nationwide LTE network in the 700 MHz spectrum licensed to FirstNet.

== Rivada Networks 5G business model ==
In November 2018, Federal Communications Commission (FCC) chairman, Ajit Pai, announced the first spectrum auction for 5G services as part of a multi-year "aggressive spectrum strategy" to "facilitate America's superiority in 5G." 5G—the "next generation of cellular technology"—will increase internet speed allowing, for example, users to "stream HD videos on your mobile network", and doctors to "perform remote surgery.

In his February 19, 2019, Fox News article, "America in race against China—and the clock—to control future of tech", Newt Gingrich, called for a public-private partnership where private capital would facilitate a "wireless moonshot" by taking advantage of a "shared spectrum available for a carrier-neutral, wholesale-only, nationwide 5G network" to "show the world that Chinese wireless dominance is not inevitable". In early spring 2019, Karl Rove, a Rivada Networks investor, had been actively lobbying Senate Armed Services Committee members and Senator John Cornyn—co-author of the Secure 5G and Beyond Act, to promote Rivada Networks' 5G business model which involved leasing the Pentagon's mid-band spectrum, according to a May 2019, The New Yorker by Sue Halpern. Halpern described how, the Department of Defense's spectrum which spans the United States, is often unused—it is set aside for "classified, unclassified, and emergency communications" and that Brad Parscale and Gingrich were making a similar case about "underutilized spectrum".

In April 2019, Washington, D.C.–based Jonathan Lee, whose work as an attorney involves FCC matters, questioned why "lifelong 'free market' defenders" like Newt Gingrich and Karl Rove were embracing a DoD/Rivada partnership.

An October 20, 2020, CNN report said that Mark Meadows—acting on behalf of President Donald Trump—has increased pressure to fast track a non-competitive lucrative contract Rivada to lease 350 megahertz of the Department of Defense's mid-band spectrum, which CNN's says, would be "premium real estate for the booming and lucrative 5G market."

Rivada has repeatedly said that is "not interested in a nationalized 5G network."

== Rivada Space Networks ==
In March 2022, Rivada announced the formation of Rivada Space Networks GmbH, a wholly owned subsidiary that plans to launch 600 low Earth orbit satellites interconnected with laser links to form a single global mesh network in space. In February 2023 Rivada announced a $2.4B order contract with Terran Orbital subsidiary Tyvak to build a 300 satellite constellation (288 + 12 spares). The satellites are expected to weigh 500kg each, the deployment would start as early as 2025.

Rivada Space Networks is headquartered in Munich, Germany, with a second office in Berlin, Germany. The CEO of Rivada Space Networks is Declan Ganley, and the team includes Mark Rigolle as COO. Rigolle is the former CEO of O3b.

Rivada has stated that its satellite network will utilize peer-to-peer orbital laser communications, removing the threat of ground-based interference from bad actors. The satellite network will utilize spectrum from two high priority Ka-band filings of Trion Space, a Liechtenstein company.

== See also ==
- Rivada Port Graham Solutions
