= Constantin Gurdgiev =

Russian-born Irish economist (born 1968)

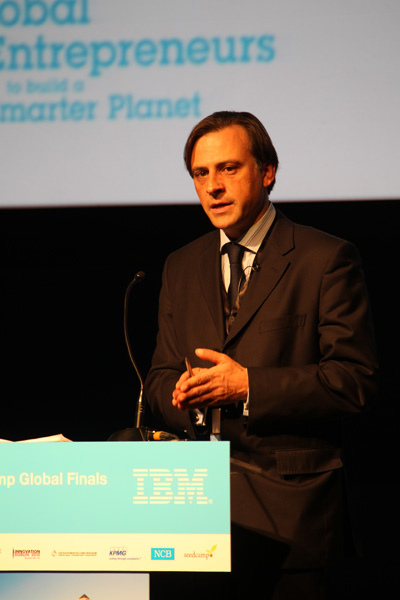
- Dr Constantin Gurdgiev at the Centre for Global Economic Development
- Born: 1968 (age 57–58); Moscow, Soviet Union
- Status: active in research
- Education: Johns Hopkins University (MA); Trinity College, Dublin (PhD)
- Occupation: Academic
- Employer(s): Trinity College, Dublin (TCD) and Monfort College of Business
- Known for: Alternative views in economics
- Notable work: Business & Finance Magazine (former editor)
- Television: Tonight with Vincent Browne (TV3)
- Title: Associate Professor of Finance, Monfort College of Business, and Visiting Professor at Trinity College, Dublin (current, with TCD since 2000)
- Board member of: Non-Executive Member, Investment Committee GoldCore ltd (2011–2014); Advisory board member (Non-Executive) Heinz GAM (2011–2018); Chairman of the Ireland Russia Business Association: IRBA (2009–2015); Head of Macroeconomics Institute for Business Value, IBM (2009–2011); Chief Economist Irish Exporters Association (2009–2011); Head of Strategy & Research, Global Markets Heinz Associates (2008–2009); non-executive director Business & Finance Magazine (2008–2009); Director of Research NCB Stockbrokers (2008–2008); Editor Business & Finance Magazine (2006–2008); Lecturer in Economics Trinity College Dublin (2000–2006)
- Partner(s): Married, Jennifer Hord
- Children: 2
- Website: Macroview.EU and TrueEconomics.Blog

Constantin Gurdgiev (Russian: Константин Гурджиев, Konstantin Gurdzhiyev; born 1968) is a Russian-born American economist and professor. He is a former editor of Business & Finance Magazine. Gurdgiev is well known in Ireland from his frequent appearances on the Tonight with Vincent Browne television show on TV3 during the great recession.

== Early life ==
Gurdgiev was born in Moscow in 1968. He holds a PhD in Macroeconomics and Finance from Trinity College, Dublin, an MA in Economics from Johns Hopkins University.

== Professional career ==
Prior to joining Monfort College of Business, University of Northern Colorado, Gurdgiev was an Associate Professor of Finance at Middlebury Institute of International Studies at Monterey (2016–2019). He is also an adjunct lecturer in Finance with Trinity College, Dublin and has lectured in Economics at University College Dublin and Johns Hopkins University. In September 2006, he became the editor of Business & Finance Magazine. He left the post in March 2008, and joined NCB Stockbrokers, but continued at the magazine as an editorial advisor and contributor.

He is a frequent contributor to international media (TV, radio and print) and posted regular columns in the Cayman Financial Review, Slon.ru (in Russian), Decision Ireland, and the Village Magazine. Gurdgiev was ranked second on the "UK & Ireland Economists Top 100" list by City A.M.

In the past, Gurdgiev served as the Partner and Head of Research with St Columbanus AG, the Head of Macroeconomics with the Institute for Business Value, IBM, and Director of Research with NCB Stockbrokers. He WAS (2009-2015) the chairman of the Ireland–Russia Business Association.

Gurdgiev frequently contributes to economic and social policy debate in Ireland and Europe. He is a regular guest on Tonight with Vincent Browne on TV3.

In May 2011, Gurdgiev set up a Swiss fund management company called St. Columbanus AG with businessman and political activist Declan Ganley.

His areas of specialty include macroeconomic risk and strategy research and thought leadership.
