= Liberty (disambiguation) =

Liberty is the ability to do as one pleases, or have the power and resources to fulfill one's purposes.

Liberty may also refer to:

== Arts, entertainment, and literature ==
=== Films and television ===
- Liberty (serial), a 1916 film serial
- Liberty (1929 film), a short film starring Laurel and Hardy
- Liberty (1986 film), a television historical drama
- Liberty!, a 1997 documentary about the American Revolutionary War
- "Liberty" (Fringe), an episode of the television series Fringe

=== Magazines ===
- Liberty (anarchist periodical), an anarchist political magazine
- Liberty (Adventist magazine), a religious liberty magazine
- Liberty (general interest magazine), a magazine published from 1924 to 1950
- Liberty (libertarian magazine), a political magazine published from 1987
- Liberties, an American literary magazine edited by Leon Wieseltier

=== Newspapers ===
- Liberty (British newspaper), an anarcho-communist paper published from 1894 to 1896
- Liberty (Thai newspaper), a defunct English-language newspaper published in Thailand

=== Other uses in arts, entertainment, and literature ===
- Liberty (manga), a 2017 manga by Izumi Kitta
- "Liberty" (poem), a 1942 poem by Paul Éluard
- "Liberty", a 1730 poem by James Thomson
- Liberty! The Saga of Sycamore Shoals, an outdoor play performed seasonally in Tennessee, US
- Liberty Liberty!, a 2005 Japanese manga
- Liberty style, the Italian variant of Art Nouveau
- Liberty/Libertà, a 2019 exhibition by the sculptor Martin Puryear at the Venice Biennale's American pavilion
- On Liberty, an 1859 political philosophy paper written by John Stuart Mill
- Liberty, a dachshund character in Paw Patrol and Paw Patrol: The Movie

== Business ==
- Liberty (department store), a London store founded in 1875 by Arthur Lasenby Liberty
- The Liberty, a shopping centre in Havering, London, England
  - Liberty 2, a former name of The Mercury Mall, an adjacent shopping centre
- Liberty Aerospace, a manufacturer of general aviation aircraft
- Liberty Alliance, a standards consortium for identity management
- Liberty Broadcasting System, a defunct radio network
- Liberty Corporation, a defunct insurance and media company, based in South Carolina, US
- Liberty Global, a media company and broadband provider
- Liberty Holdings Limited, a financial services company in South Africa
- Liberty Media, holding company for the media interests of John C. Malone
- Liberty Medical, a company that sells diabetes testers
- Liberty Mutual, a large US insurance company
- Liberty Oil, Australian petrol retailer
- Liberty Reserve, a former digital currency service
- Liberty Safe, a safe manufacturer in the US founded in 1988
- Liberty Shoes, a shoe company based in India, established in 1954
- Liberty Steel Group, a British industrial and metals company

== Music ==
=== Albums ===
- Liberty (Duran Duran album), 1990
- Liberty, a 1995 album by The Guess Who
- Liberty (Lindi Ortega album), 2018
- Liberty (Miliyah Kato album), 2016
- Liberty, a 2024 album by Takane Lui
- Liberty! (album), a 1997 album by Mark O'Connor

=== Songs ===
- "Liberty", a song by Janis Ian from Present Company
- "Liberty", a song by Heavenly from Virus
- "Liberty", a song by John 5 from Vertigo
- "Liberty", a song by Vertical Horizon from There and Back Again
- "Liberty", a song by the Grateful Dead from So Many Roads (1965–1995) and Road Trips Volume 2 Number 4
- "Liberty", a song by Journey from Time3

=== Other uses in music ===
- Liberty Music Shop Records, a record label
- Liberty Records, a former US record label
- Liberty X (formerly Liberty), a pop group founded on the British reality show Popstars

== People ==
=== Given name ===
- Liberty Hyde Bailey (1858–1954) American botanist
- Liberty Barnes, American sociologist, ethnographer, and writer
- Liberty Bartlett (1810–unknown)
- Liberty Billings (1823–1877), American officer in the Union Army, minister, and politician
- Liberty DeVitto (born 1950), American rock drummer
- Liberty Ellman (born 1971), London-born American jazz guitarist
- Liberty Heap (born 2003), English cricketer
- Liberty Ma Mya Yin (1904–1945), Burmese dancer and singer
- Liberty Poole (born 1999), English television personality and model
- Liberty Ross (born 1978), English model
- Liberty Silver (born c. 1961), Canadian singer

=== Mononym ===
- Liberty, one half of the professional wrestling tag-team The American Eagles
- Liberty, a female professional wrestler from the Gorgeous Ladies of Wrestling

=== Surname ===
- Arthur Lasenby Liberty (1843–1917), English merchant and founder of Liberty & Co.
- Clinton Liberty (born 1998), Irish actor

=== Fictional characters ===
- Liberty Valance, title character of the film The Man Who Shot Liberty Valance
- Liberty Savage, from the British Channel 4 soap opera Hollyoaks
- Liberty Van Zandt, from the Canadian television drama Degrassi: The Next Generation
- Liberty (personification), the anthropomorphic portrayal of the concept of liberty, often as a goddess

== Places ==
=== United States ===
- Liberty City (disambiguation)
- Liberty County (disambiguation)
- Liberty Township (disambiguation)
- Liberty, Arizona
- Liberty, California, a community in Sonoma County
- Liberty, San Joaquin County, California, a ghost town
- Liberty, Idaho
- Liberty, Illinois
- Liberty, Saline County, Illinois
- Liberty, Indiana
- Liberty, Kansas
- Liberty, Kentucky
- Garden Village, Kentucky or Liberty, a community in Pike County
- Liberty, Maine
- Liberty, Mississippi
- Liberty, Missouri
- Liberty, Nebraska
- Liberty (town), New York, a town in Sullivan County, New York
- Liberty (village), New York, a village in Sullivan County, New York
- Liberty, North Carolina
- Liberty, Ohio
- Liberty, Oklahoma
- Liberty, Pennsylvania (disambiguation), three places
- Liberty Mountain Resort, a ski area in Carroll Valley, Pennsylvania
- Liberty, South Carolina
- Liberty, Tennessee
- Liberty, Texas
- Liberty, Utah
- Tridell, Utah, also called Liberty
- Liberty, Washington
- Liberty, West Virginia
- Liberty, Wisconsin (disambiguation), five places
- West Liberty (disambiguation)
- Liberty Bell, an iconic symbol of American independence in Philadelphia
- Liberty University, a Christian research university in Lynchburg, Virginia
  - Liberty Flames and Lady Flames, the university's athletic program
- Statue of Liberty, an 1886 colossal neoclassical sculpture on Liberty Island in the middle of New York Harbor, in Manhattan, New York City

=== Other places ===
- The Liberties, Dublin, a district in the south-west inner city of Dublin, Ireland
- Liberty, Saskatchewan, Canada

== Transportation ==
=== Water transport ===
- Liberty ship, a design of cargo ship mass-produced in the US during World War II
- Liberty (ship), a list of ships named Liberty
- Liberty pass, for shore leave
- HMS Liberty (J391), a World War II minesweeper

=== Aviation ===
- Liberty (rocket), a proposed rocket for crew and cargo
- Airco DH.4, at one point called "Liberty Planes"
- Associated Air Liberty 181, an American aircraft design
- Rolls-Royce AE 1107C-Liberty aeroengine

=== Land transport ===
- Avelia Liberty, a high-speed train built by Alstom for the North American market
- Liberty Motor Car, an American car manufacturer from 1916 to 1923
- Liberty truck, a former US cargo vehicle
- Jeep Liberty, an SUV
- Liberty L-12, a US First World War V12 aero-engine also used in 1930s British tanks as the Nuffield Liberty
- Tank Mark VIII, the Mark VIII or "Liberty", an Anglo-American development of the main British tank of the First World War
- Liberty (Muni), a station on the San Francisco Municipal Railway
- Liberty line, a railway line in London

== Plants and animals ==
- Liberty (apple), a hybrid apple cultivar
- Liberty (dog) (1974–1984), golden retriever pet of Gerald Ford

== Organizations ==
- Liberty (advocacy group), a UK pressure group that campaigns to protect civil liberties and human rights
- Liberty (division), a largely medieval English administrative unit
- New York Liberty, a women's basketball team

== Other uses ==
- Liberty (Go), an empty space adjacent to a group of stones in the board game Go
- Liberty, a term used for shore leave in the US Coast Guard, US Marine Corps, and US Navy
- Liberty, a cheerleading stunt

== See also ==
- Liberty Party (disambiguation)
- Liberty Stadium (disambiguation)
- Liberty Tree (disambiguation)
- Goddess of Liberty (disambiguation)
- Lady Liberty (disambiguation)
- Mount Liberty (disambiguation)
- Liberta (disambiguation)
- Libertas (disambiguation)
- Liberté (disambiguation)
- Libertyville, Illinois
