= SS Liberty =

Liberty was the name of a number of steamships, including:

- SS Liberty (1890), a Lancashire and Yorkshire Railway ship
- SS Liberty (1918 Federal)
- SS Liberty (1918 Palmers)

== See also ==
- Liberty (ship), other ships with the name
- Liberty (disambiguation)
