= List of ships named USS Liberty =

USS Liberty may refer to:

- USS Liberty (1775), was an American Revolutionary War ship
- USS Liberty (ID-3461), was a transport ship launched in June 1918 and decommissioned in May 1919, and as USAT Liberty, a United States Army transport ship sunk in 1942
- USAT Liberty beached World War II landing ship wrecked during Mount Agung 1963–64 eruption
- USS Liberty, was a ship strafed and bombed by Israeli airforce in June 1967, resulting in more than 34 dead and 171 wounded and its decommissioning as beyond repair (USS Liberty incident is the main article concerning the attack).

== Other ==
- USS Liberty III (SP-1229), a patrol vessel in commission from 1917 to 1919

== See also ==
- USS Liberty incident (8 June 1967) during the Six Day War
- Liberty ship, World War II US merchant marine naval cargo ships
- Liberty (ship), ships named "Liberty"
- Liberty (disambiguation)
