= Freedom Monument (disambiguation) =

The Freedom Monument is a memorial in Riga, Latvia, honouring soldiers killed during the Latvian War of Independence (1918–1920).

Freedom Monument may also refer to:

- Freedom Monument in Tbilisi, Georgia.
- Freedom Monument in Baghdad, Iraq.
- Freedom Monument in Kaunas, Lithuania.
- Freedom Monument in Peru.
- Freedom Monument in Bydgoszcz, Poland.
- Freedom Monument in Bytom, Poland.

== See also ==
- Statue of Freedom
- Statue of Liberty (disambiguation)
- Monument of Liberty (disambiguation)
- Liberty Monument (disambiguation)
