= Eleutheria =

Greek personification of Liberty

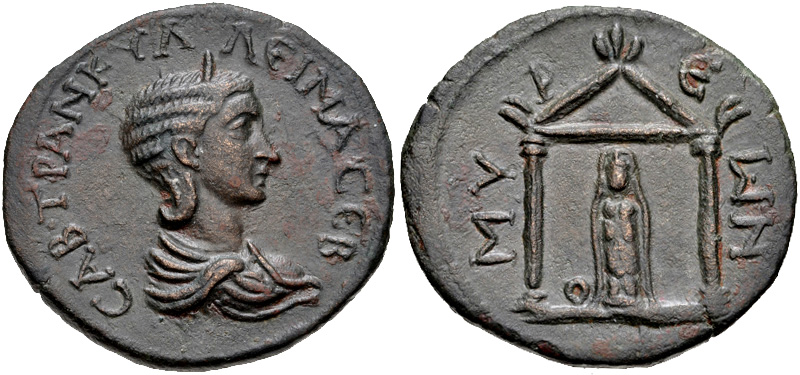
Artemis Eleutheria, from a coin minted in Myra of Lycia in honour of Empress Tranquillina.

The Greek word "ἐλευθερία" (capitalized Ἐλευθερία; Attic Greek pronunciation: [eleu̯tʰeˈria]; Modern Greek pronunciation: [elefθeˈɾia]), transliterated as eleutheria or eleftheria, is a Greek term for, and personification of, the Goddess of Liberty. Eleutheria personified had a brief career on coins of Alexandria.

In Ancient Greece, Eleutheria was also an epithet for the goddess Artemis, and as such she was worshipped in Myra of Lycia. The Roman equivalent of the goddess Eleutheria is Libertas, a goddess in her own right, and a personification of liberty.

== Etymology ==
For R. F. Willets, Cretan dialect 'Eleuthia' would connect Eileithyia (or perhaps a goddess 'Eleutheria') to Eleusis. The name is probably related to Eleutherna, a city in Crete. Walter Burkert believed that 'Eleuthyia', the Greek goddess of birth, was pure Greek 'in precisely this form'. However the relation with the Greek prefix ἐλεύθ is uncertain, because the prefix appears in some Pre-Greek toponyms like Ἐλευθέρνα (Eleutherna).

Hyginus describes Eleutheria as a daughter of Zeus and Hera.

In Roman mythology, Demeter (Ceres) has a daughter named Libera (Liberty/Freedom).

== Modern interpretations ==
I. F. Stone, who taught himself Greek in his old age, wrote a book, The Trial of Socrates, pointing out that Socrates and Plato do not value eleutheria, freedom; instead were Sparta-lovers, wanting a monarch, an oligarchy, instead of a democracy, a republic.

The French philosopher Michel Foucault, in lectures given at Berkeley and Boulder, made the same argument for Socrates' failure to invoke parrhesia, freedom of speech, the obligation to speak the truth for the common good at personal risk, in his own defense at his trial, preferring to die in obedience to law as above men. Athenians held that they democratically shaped law, seeing Socrates' stance as treason.

== See also ==
- Hymn to Liberty (Ýmnos eis tīn Eleutherían)
