= Liberty (ship) =

Several ships have been named or referred to as Liberty or as a Liberty ship:

- Liberty ship, a class of US cargo ships mass-produced during World War II
  - List of Liberty ships, particular ships of that type
- HMS Liberty, various ships of the British Royal Navy
- USS Liberty (1775), an American Revolutionary War ship
- Liberty (1784 ship), a merchant vessel launched at Broadstairs and burnt by the French navy at Montserrat in 1805.
- Liberty (1787 ship) was of British origin, built in 1775, that first appeared as Liberty in 1787. She made six complete whale hunting voyages in the British Southern Whale Fishery before being lost in 1798 on her seventh voyage.
- SS Liberty (1890)
- Liberty (sternwheeler), a sternwheel steamboat (built in 1903), in Oregon, United States
- SY Liberty, a large steam yacht built in 1903 for Joseph Pulitzer and later serving as a British hospital ship in World War I, as HMHS Liberty
- USS Liberty III (SP-1229), a United States Navy patrol vessel in commission from 1917 to 1919
- USAT Liberty, a United States Army cargo ship in commission from 1918 to 1942
- USS Liberty (ID-3461), was a transport ship launched in June 1918 and decommissioned in May 1919, and as USAT Liberty, a United States Army transport ship sunk in 1942
- USS Liberty (AGTR-5), a US Navy electronic intelligence ship strafed and bombed by the Israeli airforce resulting in more than 34 dead and 171 wounded and its decommissioning as beyond repair.
  - The USS Liberty incident, in which Israel attacked the USS Liberty during the Six-Day War
- Liberty (yacht), a 12-metre class yacht that unsuccessfully defended the America's Cup in 1983
- Carnival Liberty, a Conquest class cruise ship operated by Carnival Cruise Line
- Liberty (Sausalito fireboat), see Sausalito, California

== See also ==
- Liberty (disambiguation)
