= Lady Liberty =

Lady Liberty may refer to:

- Liberty (personification), female personification of Liberty
  - Statue of Liberty (Liberty Enlightening the World), a colossal statue in New York harbor sculpted by Frédéric Auguste Bartholdi
- Lady Liberty (comics), a set of characters in the DC Comics Universe
- Lady Liberty (film), La mortadella, 1971 French-Italian comedy
- Lady Liberty (tree), an ancient bald cypress tree in Big Tree Park, Longwood, Florida
- Lady Liberty Hong Kong, statue created during the 2019 Hong Kong protests
- Mariam al-Mansouri or Lady Liberty, UAE fighter pilot
- "Lady Liberty", a rewrite of the song "Lady Lynda" by Al Jardine and Ron Altbach for The Beach Boys

== See also ==
- Liberty Lady, an American B-17G of World War II
- Liberty (disambiguation)
- Goddess of Liberty (disambiguation)
- Statue of Liberty (disambiguation)
