= 1944 Örnahusen B-17 Flying Fortress crash =

1944 aviation accident in Sweden

Coordinates: 55°26′53″N 14°15′46″E

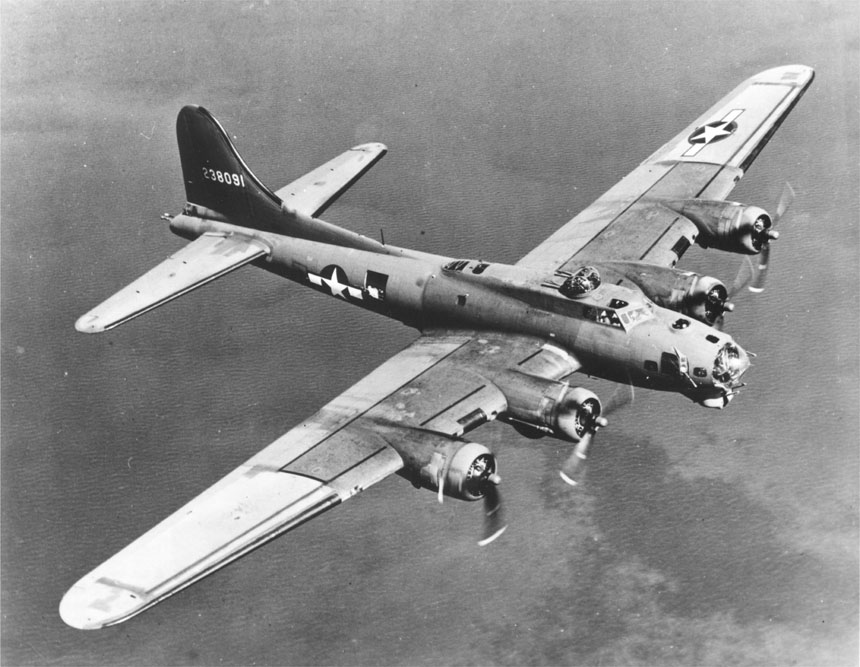
- A similar B-17 Flying Fortress

Occurrence
- Date: 24 May 1944
- Summary: Emergency water landing of a damaged U.S. B-17 bomber off the coast of Sweden during WWII
- Site: Örnahusen, Skåne, Sweden

Aircraft
- Aircraft type: Boeing B-17G Flying Fortress
- Aircraft name: "LL-K"
- Operator: United States Army Air Forces
- Registration: 42-107178
- Flight origin: RAF Bassingbourn, England
- Destination: England (return from bombing mission)
- Crew: 9
- Fatalities: 3
- Survivors: 6

The 1944 Örnahusen Boeing B-17 Flying Fortress crash occurred on 24 May 1944, when a U.S. Army Air Forces B-17 Flying Fortress bomber of the 91st Bombardment Group was hit after a bombing mission over Germany during World War II. Flying to Sweden, it crashed into the Baltic Sea off the coast of Örnahusen, Sweden.

The crash site has become a small historical landmark, including a memorial.

== Mission ==
The B-17 aircraft took off at 6:00 am (local time) on 24 May 1944 from its base in Bassingbourn, England as part of a formation of other bombers targeting industrial sites near Berlin. The plane belonged to the 401st Bombardment Squadron, 91st Bombardment Group with the mission to bomb an industrial area on the outskirts of Berlin. After completing the bombing run, the formation encountered anti-aircraft fire northeast of Berlin on its return journey. The aircraft was hit and caught fire, and one of the crew members was shot in the arm.

The pilot, lieutenant William F. Nee, ordered the crew to abandon the plane. The pilot, co-pilot and navigator jumped out through the open bomb hatches and were captured by German soldiers. The other six crew members did not hear the order because the intercom wires behind the pilot's seat had burned out and remained on board. They managed to extinguish the fire. Ensign Frederic T Neel Jr., a trained navigator and rear gunner Donald E Spaulding, who were not trained as a pilot, were able to take control of the aircraft and headed for neutral Sweden.

=== Crash ===
Around midday, the aircraft reached the southeastern coast of Sweden, near Ystad. The Swedish military had perceived the damaged aircraft as a threat and fired at it. The aircraft circled for a time around Skillinge and Simrishamn before three of the remaining crew members bailed out near Simrishamn. Two of them survived, but one drowned.

The plane then turned south, and two more crew members jumped out of the aircraft. One was rescued, while the other drowned after being swept out to sea by strong winds.

2nd Lt. Fredric T. Neel Jr. remained onboard and attempted an emergency water landing near Örnahusen. He maneuvered the aircraft away from homes and a nearby school, likely saving lives on the ground. However, the plane stalled at a low altitude and crashed hard into the sea approximately 50–100 meters offshore. The aircraft broke apart, exploded and sank. Neel was killed.

== Aftermath ==
The three surviving crew members who bailed out over Sweden were interned in Lokabrunn by the Swedish military and in October 1944, repatriated to the United States, while one was allowed to stay in Sweden until February 1945. Those who had parachuted over Germany earlier during the mission were captured and held as prisoners of war.

The body of Fredric T. Neel Jr. washed ashore on 8 July 1944.

In 2006, Neel was posthumously awarded the Purple Heart in recognition of his bravery, particularly for ordering the last of the crew to bail out and for steering the aircraft away from populated areas.

== Commemorating ==
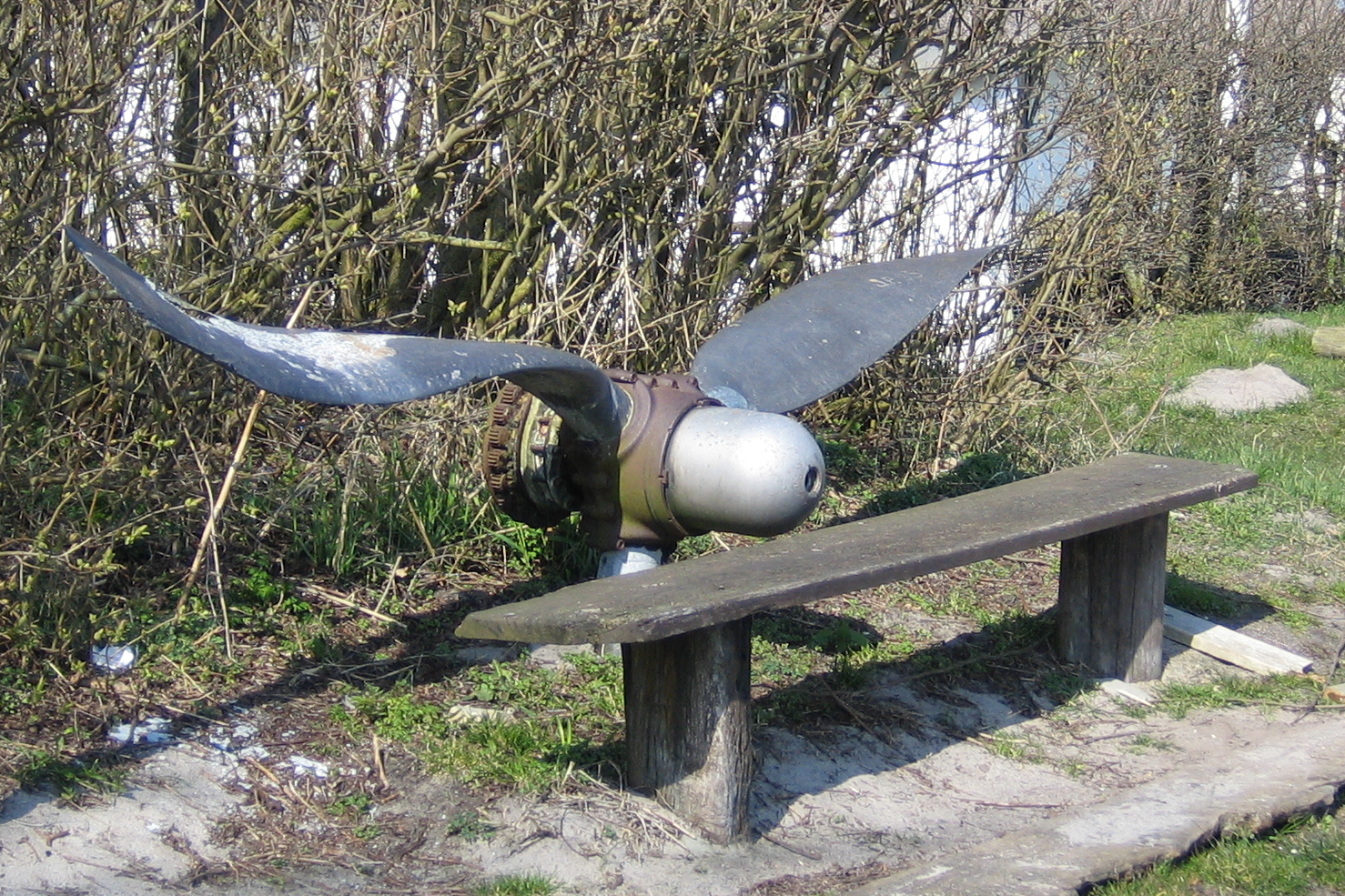
Propeller of the aircraft, displayed near the beach in Örnahusen together with an information plaque

The crash site has become a small historical landmark, remembered for the sacrifice and courage of the crew. As a memorial, a propeller from the aircraft is displayed near the beach in Örnahusen, along with an informational plaque commemorating the incident. One of the parachutes of the crewmembers is in the collection of the Skillinge Maritime Museum in Skillinge.

== See also ==
- Liberty Lady
