= Liberty Monument =

Liberty Monument may refer to:

- Liberty Monument (Ticonderoga), monument to the history of Fort Ticonderoga, erected 1924
- Liberty Monument (Nicosia), monument to Cyprus independence fighters, erected 1973
- Liberty Monument (Seychelles), monument to independence, erected 2014
- Liberty Statue (Budapest), erected 1947
- Battle of Liberty Place Monument, New Orleans monument to the Battle of Liberty Place, erected 1891 and dismantled 2017

== See also ==
- Monument of Liberty (disambiguation)
- Freedom Monument (disambiguation)
- Statue of Liberty in New York
