= St. John, Putnam County, Missouri =

Unincorporated community in Missouri, United States

Coordinates: 40.5400111°N 93.1890997°W

St. John is an unincorporated community in Putnam County, in the U.S. state of Missouri.

== History ==
St. John was laid out in 1846 in Section 8 of western Sherman Township. A post office called Saint John was established in 1849, and remained in operation until 1908. A post office in Delpha in section 1 of eastern Sherman Township established in 1891 also closed in 1908. The West Liberty post office also closed in 1908.
