= Freedom Monument (Bytom) =

- Polish: Pomnik Wolności
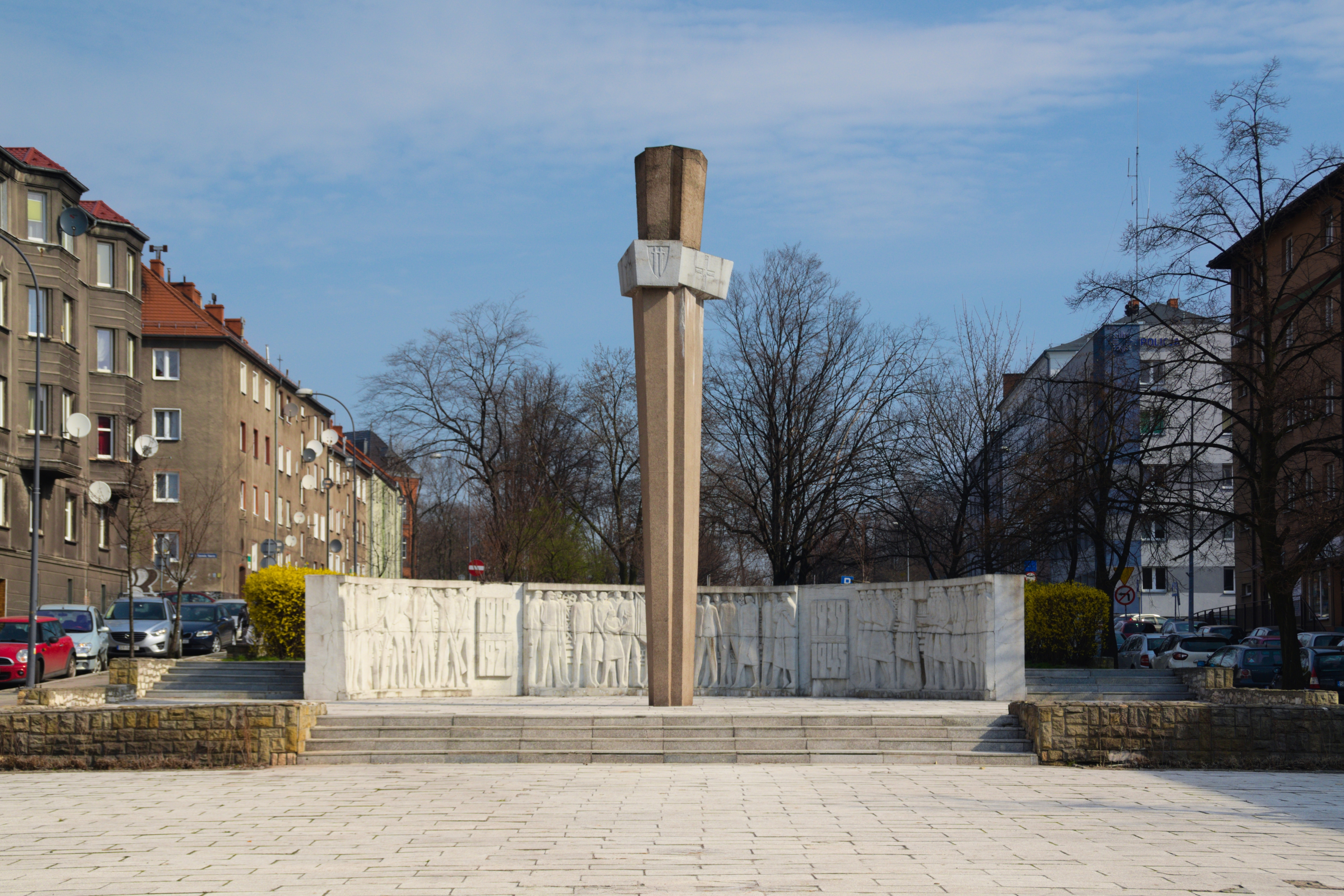
- The monument in April 2019.
- Interactive map of Freedom Monument
- Location: Bytom, Poland
- Coordinates: 50°21′05″N 18°54′59″E
- Designer: Tadeusz Wrzecionek
- Completion date: 13 October, 1968
- Restored date: 1991, 2003
- Dedicated to: Silesian Uprisings, World War II

The Freedom Monument (Polish: Pomnik Wolności) is a monument situated by Piłsudski Street in downtown Bytom, Poland. It is dedicated to the Silesian Uprisings as well as the Second World War in Upper Silesia, and is the tallest monument in the city.

The monument serves as the venue for annual national celebrations, such as May 3rd and November 11th, and is occasionally known as the Monument of the Insurgent Act (Polish: Pomnik Czynu Powstańczego w Bytomiu).

== Description ==
The monument was designed by local sculptor Tadeusz Wrzecionek (1911–1967), and was unveiled on 13 October, 1968, for the 5th Congress of the Polish United Workers' Party. It commemorates Polish traditions of freedom and independence, and is dedicated to the history of the three Silesian Uprisings and the Second World War on the territory of Upper Silesia.

The monument is designed in the form of a column with a crosspiece (resembling a sword), which features engraved Polish national symbols, namely the Silesian Insurgent Cross, the Partisan Cross, the Rodło, the Grunwald Swords and the symbol of the concentration camps—the Auschwitz Cross. Originally, the monument also featured the hammer and sickle.
The background of the monument displays numerous character props, reflecting the industrial character of Upper Silesia, as well as the dates 1919-1921 (denoting to the Silesian Uprisings) and 1939-1945 (denoting to the Second World War).

== Controversy over communist symbolism ==
With the fall of communism in Poland, the monument's hammer and sickle disappeared during restoration in 1991. However, in 2003 during the term of the SLD-aligned President Krzysztof Wójcik the communist symbol was restored with his personal approval, sparking outrage across Bytom. The restoration led to a protracted legal struggle headed by the opposition in Bytom, aiming to remove the symbol.

The authorities of Bytom argued that the removal of the hammer and sickle in 1991 was conducted in secret, and was illegal. Jan Czubak, SLD member and chairman of the Bytom City Council, stated during this time that the removal of the symbol can only commence after an opinion from the Council for the Protection of Struggle and Martyrdom Sites is received. Ultimately, the symbol was removed, however, in recent years the plaster used to cover up the communist symbol has started to fall off—revealing the hammer and sickle once more.

== See also ==
- Monument of Silesian Insurgents, Katowice
