= Monument of Liberty =

Monument of Liberty may refer to:

- Monument of Liberty, Rousse, Bulgaria
- Monument of Liberty, Istanbul, Turkey

== See also ==
- Liberty Monument (disambiguation)
- Statue of Liberty (disambiguation)
- Freedom Monument (disambiguation)
- Statue of Freedom
