= Mount Liberty =

Mount Liberty is the name of some places in the United States:

Mountains

- Mount Liberty (New Hampshire), in the White Mountains

Communities

- Mount Liberty, Indiana
- Mount Liberty, Ohio
- Mount Liberty, West Virginia
