= West Liberty =

West Liberty may refer to some places in the United States:

- West Liberty, Illinois
- West Liberty, Howard County, Indiana
- West Liberty, Jay County, Indiana
- West Liberty, Iowa
- West Liberty, Kentucky
- West Liberty, Missouri
- West Liberty, Ohio, in Logan County
- West Liberty, Crawford County, Ohio
- West Liberty, Morrow County, Ohio
- West Liberty, Pennsylvania
- West Liberty, West Virginia
  - West Liberty University
