= Liberty, Pennsylvania =

Liberty is the name of some places in the U.S. state of Pennsylvania:

- Liberty, Allegheny County, Pennsylvania
- Liberty, Tioga County, Pennsylvania
- Liberty Mountain Resort, a ski area located in Carroll Valley, Pennsylvania

== See also ==
- Liberty Township, Pennsylvania (disambiguation)
