= Mästermyr chest =

Viking age tool chest

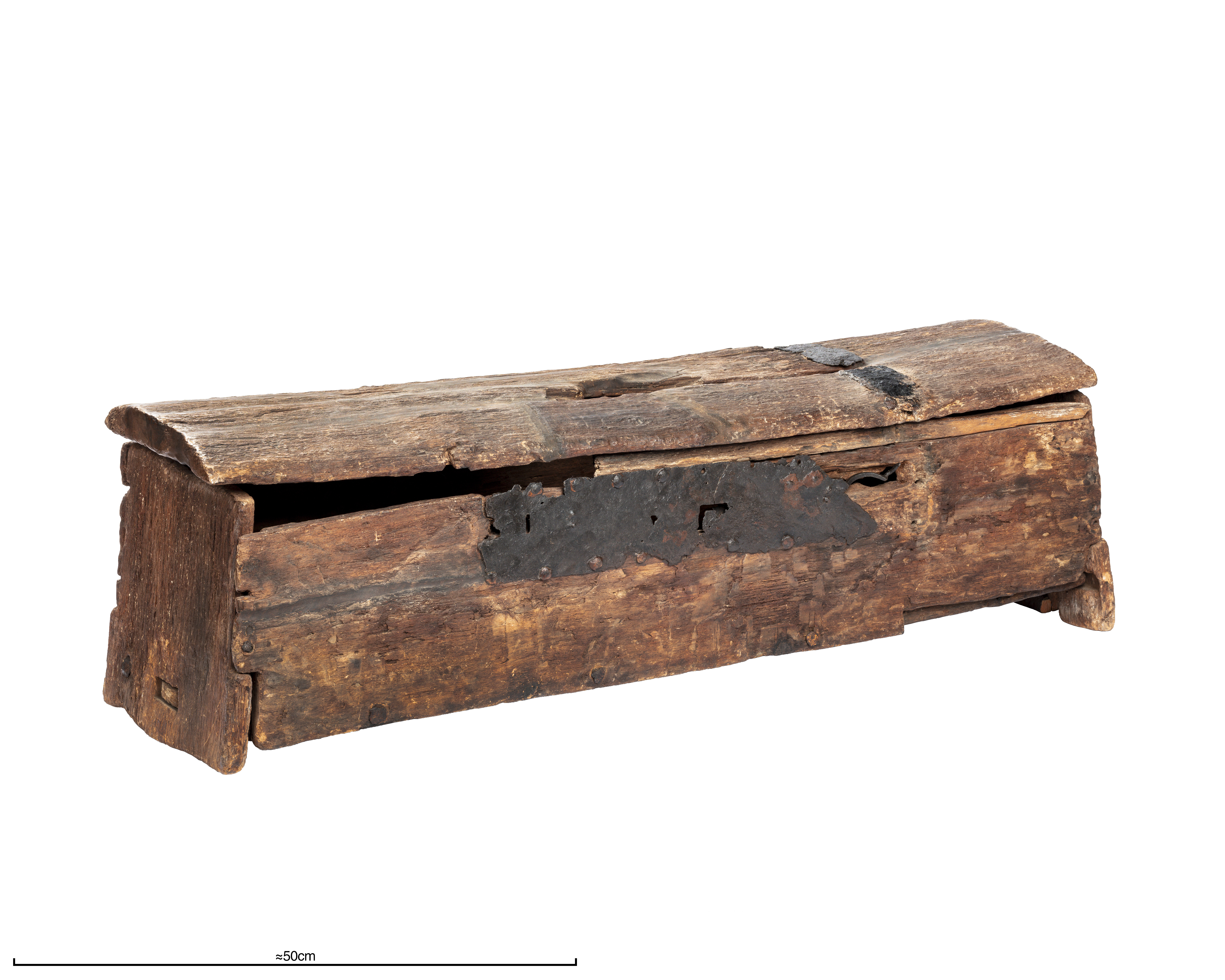
The Mästermyr chest

The Mästermyr chest (Swedish: Mästermyrkistan) is a Viking Age tool chest found in the Mästermyr mire west of Hemse on the island of Gotland, Sweden. It is the largest tool find from that era in Europe.

== History ==
During the Viking Age, the area where Mästermyr mire is located was a lake. The mire was drained in 1902–10. In October 1936, the chest was found by farmer Hugo Kraft in a field owned by Emil Norrby in Snoder, Sproge near Hemse. It was found in an area that was ploughed for the first time.

The chest is now on display in the Swedish History Museum in Stockholm.

== Find ==
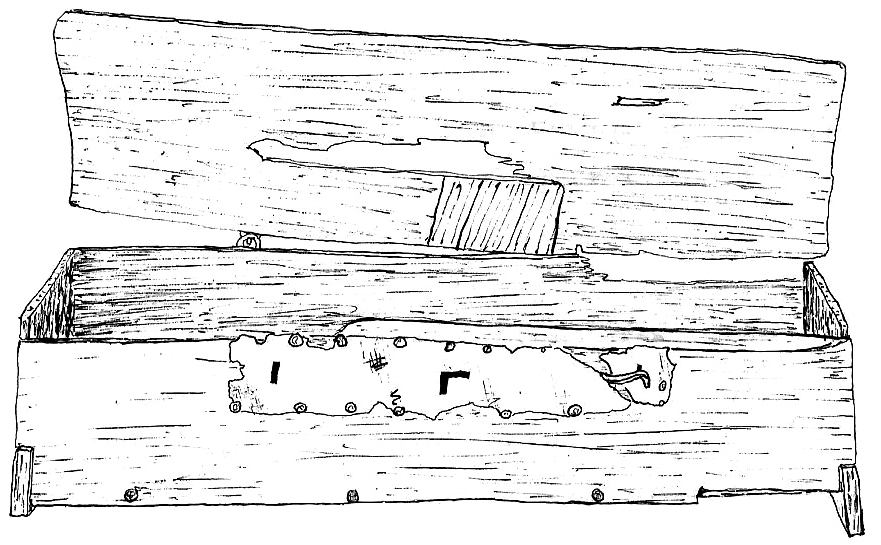
Mästermyr chest

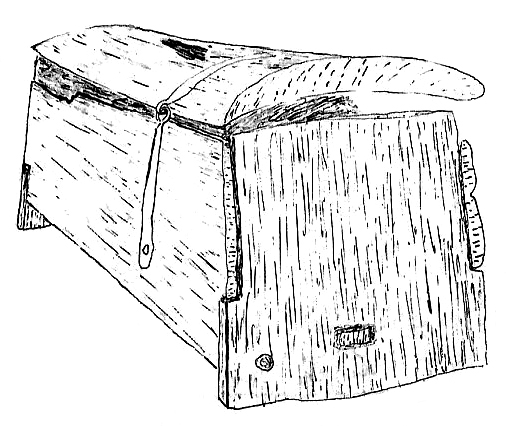
Back and side of the chest

Most of the find had been placed in the chest, but there were also objects around it such as three bronze cauldrons, three bells and a fire-grid of iron. A chain, made up of 26 figure-of-eight shaped links, was wrapped around it. It served both as an extra lock and handle since the chest was too heavy for the original handle. The chest and the other items had probably been placed in a boat which capsized and sank in the lake. Another theory is that the chest was temporarily hidden at the water's edge.

The chest contained Viking-era blacksmithing and woodworking tools. It also contained several products of such work, including elements of several locks. The chest and its contents provide a valuable insight into technology during the Viking Age.

The chest, 90 cm (35 in) long, 26 cm (10 in) wide and 24 cm (9.4 in) high, was made of oak with iron hinges and lock. It was intact despite the rough encounter with the plough. It was rectangular with a slightly curved lid and flat bottom. The bottom was joined to the ends via a mortise and through tenon. Pegs were used to attach the sides to the bottom and end pieces. The ends and sides were trapezoidal and slightly angled. A lock wrought from iron was attached to the front side of the chest.

Given the wide range of tools and objects in varying styles in the find, and the lack of coins or other chronological markers, it has been impossible to determine an exact date for the chest. The wider term "Viking Age" around 1000, is used for dating it.

== Contents of the chest ==
The chest contained over 200 tools and blacksmith works or works in progress, making it the largest Viking tool find in Europe. The tools resemble early Roman tools, now on display in museums in Germany, among those the Saalburg. Technological influences spread throughout Europe with the expansion of the Roman empire. The ensuing trade carried ideas and craftsmanship further to regions far from Rome.

The contents of the chest indicate that it belonged to a travelling craftsman who made repairs and produced new items. The tools show that he was a smith and a carpenter, and had some knowledge of locks, coppersmithing and coopering. Among the items were three padlocks of a design inspired by Roman locks and of the same kind that were found at excavations in Birka.

=== Contents ===
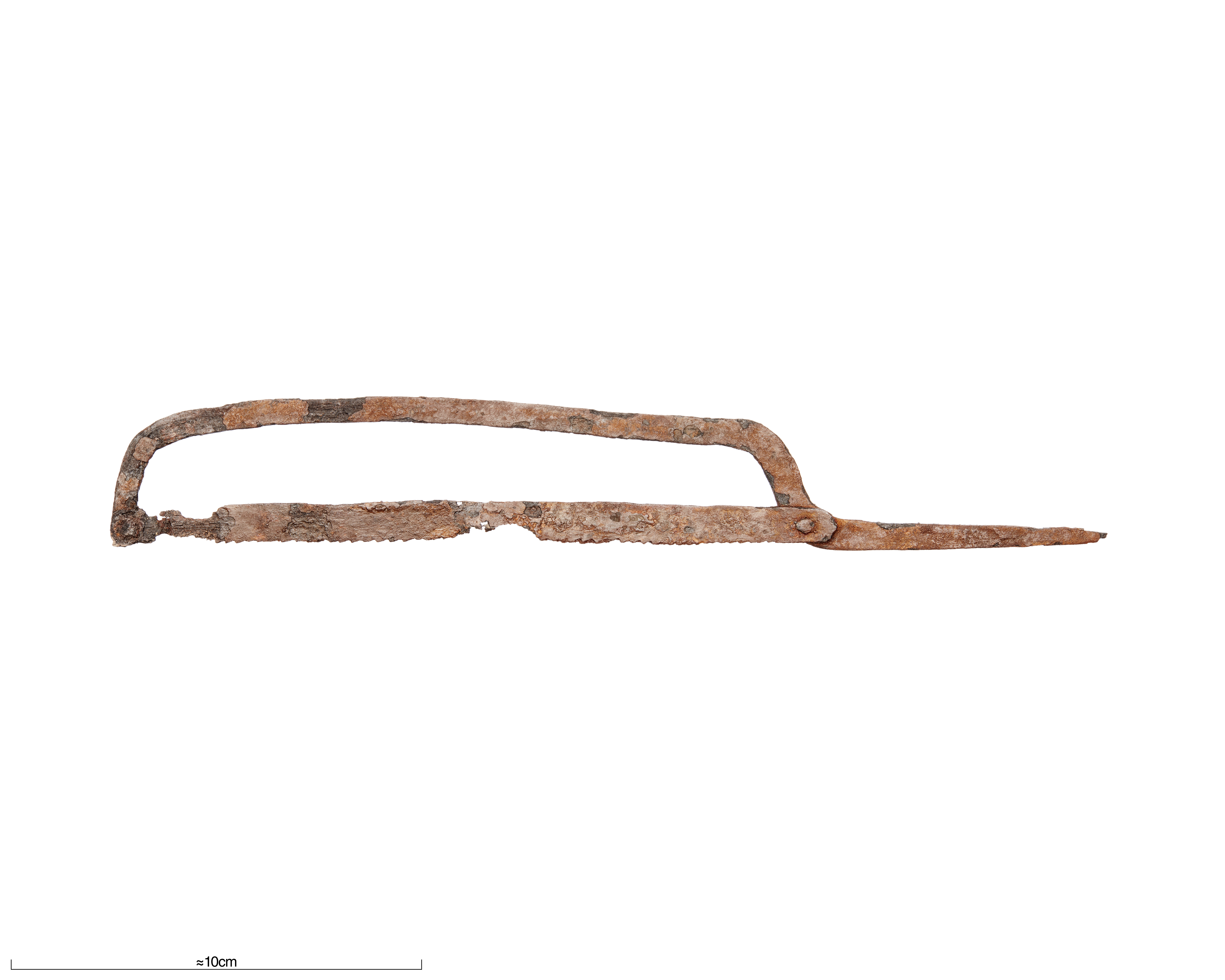
Saw

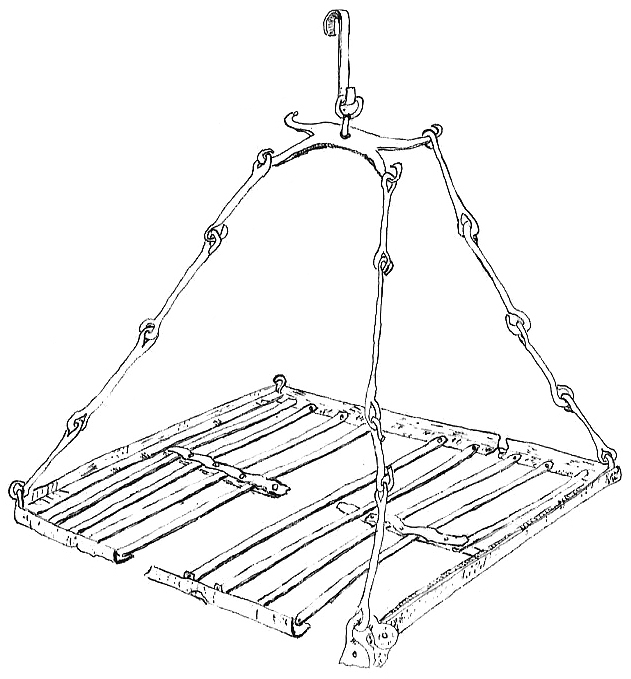
The fire-grid

Some of the tools and objects in the chest:

- Three padlocks
- Two keys
- Springs, plates and other parts of locks
- Three sledgehammers
- Three hammers
- One ball-peen hammer
- One pair of large forging tongs
- One pair of snips
- Four smaller anvils
- Tools for making nails
- Three stamping pads
- Some smaller axes
- One large broadaxe
- One wide adze
- One hand saw
- Six spoon-augers
- One saw blade
- One chisel
- One gouge
- Four files
- Two knives
- Two bradawls
- One spatula
- Two sharpening stones
- One steelyard balance
- Four clamps
- One hacksaw
- Two rasps
- One pair of tongs
- One chisel
- One stone chisel
- One ash-rake
- One punch
- Two tripods
- Two drawknives
- Miscellaneous metal fittings

== Present-day replicas ==
The chest and its contents are being replicated by enthusiasts all over the world, some using the same techniques as those used to make the originals.
