= Mästermyr =

Bog in Gotland, Sweden

- mire, cultivated
- Location within Gotland
- Coordinates: 57°14′01″N 18°15′00″E
- Location: Gotland, Sweden

Area
  - Total: 2,670 hectares (6,600 acres)
- Elevation: 20 m (64 ft)

Mästermyr is a, now mostly drained, mire west of Hemse on the island of Gotland, Sweden. The Mästermyr chest was found here in 1936.

== Geography ==
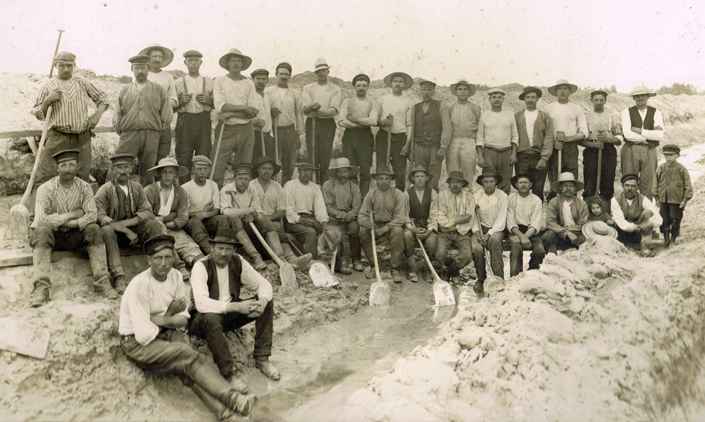
Workers draining Mästermyr 1902–1910

The area of the mire was originally 26.7 km^{2} (10.3 sq mi), of which 3.2 km^{2} (1.2 sq mi) consisted of small lakes. It was a significant habitat for water birds and the lakes were used for fishing. A suggestion about draining the mire was first presented in 1898. The mire was drained in 1902–10. Some of the lakes that dried up were Tunngansträsk, Storträsk, Nydträsk, Risalaträsk and Eskesträsk.

Just south of the mire is the Havor Iron Age hillfort. At the time it was built, the mire was still lakes and the fort was located on the shore of one of these. In 1961, an archaeological excavation of the hillfort lead to the discovery of the Havor Hoard.

== History ==
As part of a national program for public works to reduce unemployment in 1920–21, a total of 22.5 km (14.0 mi) of roads were constructed at Mästermyr. By the 1930s, 12 km^{2} (4.6 sq mi) of the former mire was cultivated.

On 21 April 1940, a German Heinkel He 111 aircraft was forced to make an emergency landing at Mästermyr. It was one of three planes en route to bomb the Steinkjer – Trondheim railway in Norway. Due to cloudy weather they had to abort and return to Aalborg. The navigators had been given faulty information about the prevailing wind conditions and when they broke through the clouds, the planes were over Gotland instead of Skagerrak. Swedish air defence fired on the planes and two of them had to make emergency landings, one at Mästermyr and one at När. The third plane managed to escape and landed on Bornholm.

On 6 March 1944, an American Boeing B-17 Flying Fortress aircraft named Liberty Lady crash landed in Mästermyr after sustaining flak damage during a bombing run over Berlin, Germany.

In 2008, Swedish power company Vattenfall initiated a project to build a wind farm on Mästermyr. The plans were stopped through a decision made by the Swedish Land and Environment Court in July 2012.
