= Liberty, Outagamie County, Wisconsin =

Liberty, Wisconsin
- Town
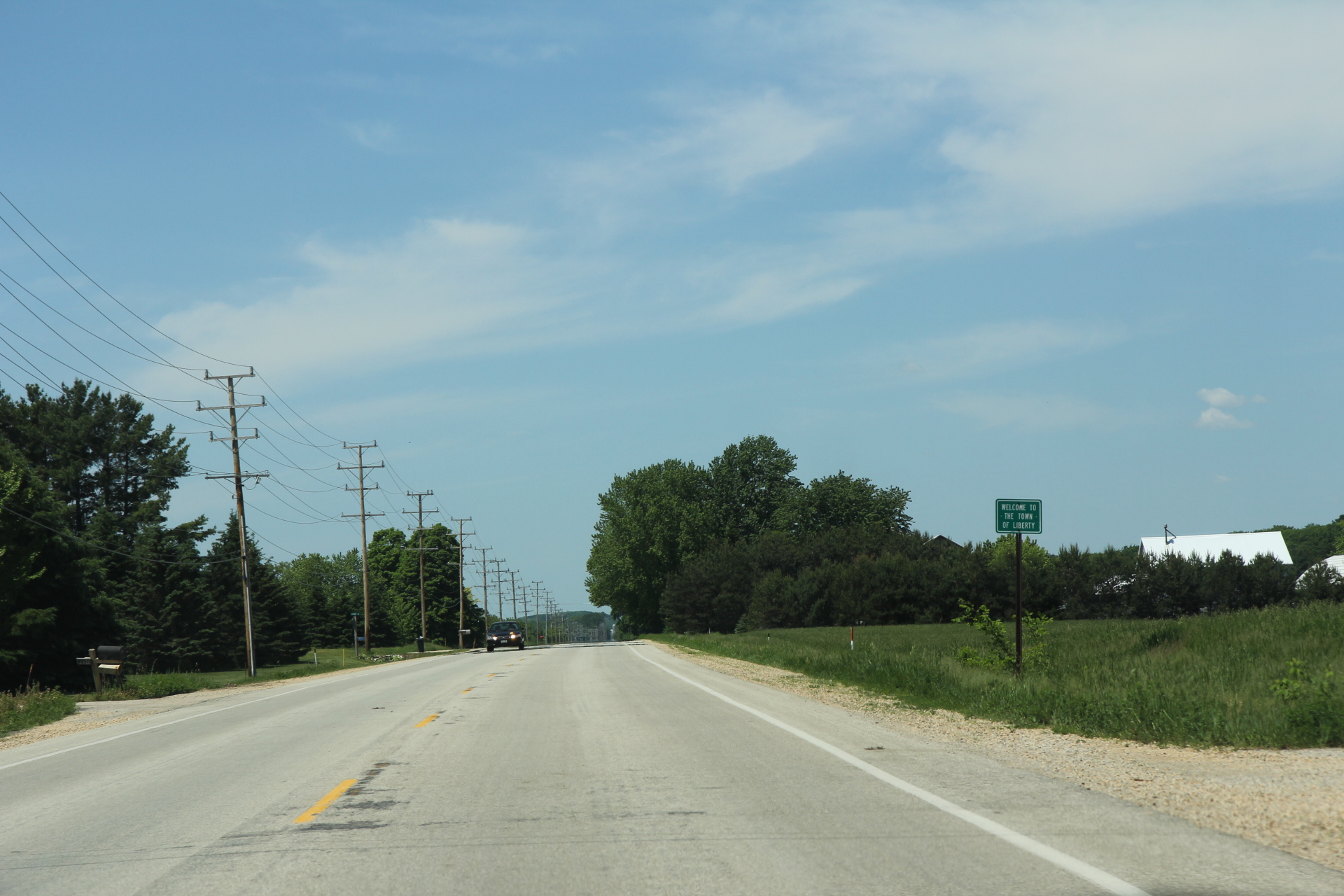
- Entering the Town of Liberty on Wisconsin Highway 54

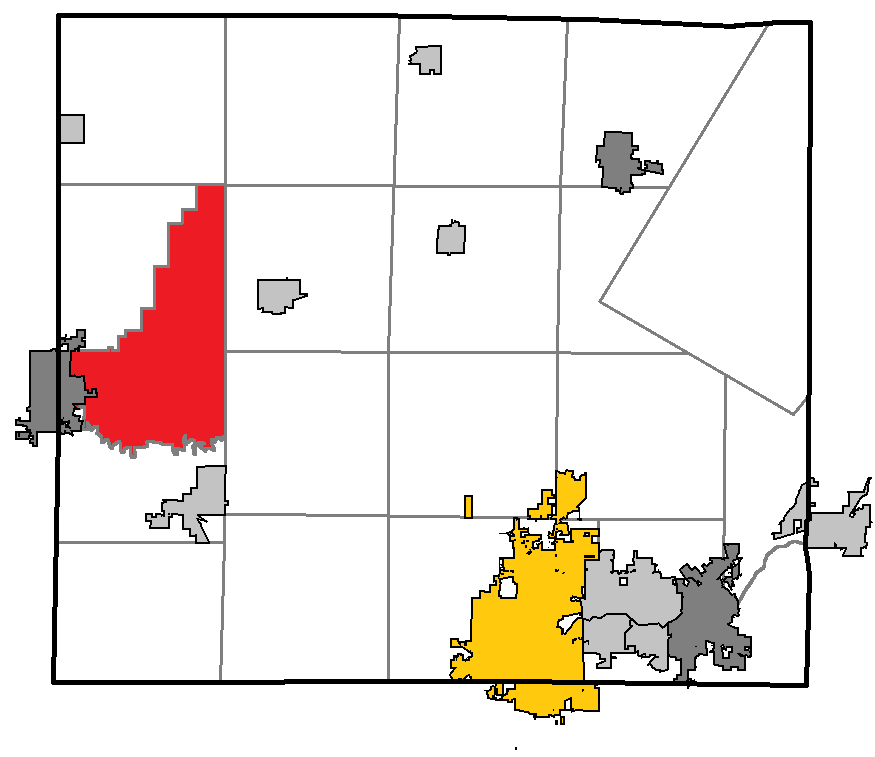
- Location of Liberty, within Outagamie County, Wisconsin
- Coordinates: 44°24′57″N 88°39′15″W
- Country: United States
- State: Wisconsin
- County: Outagamie

Area
  - Total: 30.8 sq mi (79.7 km^{2})
  - Land: 30.6 sq mi (79.3 km^{2})
  - Water: 0.12 sq mi (0.3 km^{2})
- Elevation: 768 ft (234 m)

Population (2020)
  - Total: 826
  - Density: 27.0/sq mi (10.4/km^{2})
- Time zone: UTC-6 (Central (CST))
  - Summer (DST): UTC-5 (CDT)
- FIPS code: 55-43875
- GNIS feature ID: 1583552
- Website: https://townoflibertyocwi.gov/

There are three other towns called 'Liberty' in Wisconsin. See Liberty, Wisconsin

Liberty is a town in Outagamie County, Wisconsin, United States. The population was 826 at the 2020 census.

== Geography ==
According to the United States Census Bureau, the town has a total area of 30.8 square miles (79.7 km^{2}), of which 30.6 square miles (79.3 km^{2}) is land and 0.1 square mile (0.3 km^{2}) (0.42%) is water.

== Demographics ==
As of the census of 2000, there were 834 people, 267 households, and 230 families residing in the town. The population density was 27.2 people per square mile (10.5/km^{2}). There were 283 housing units at an average density of 9.2 per square mile (3.6/km^{2}). The racial makeup of the town was 96.16% White, 0.12% African American, 0.60% Native American, 0.12% Asian, 2.28% from other races, and 0.72% from two or more races. Hispanic or Latino of any race were 2.88% of the population.

There were 267 households, out of which 44.2% had children under the age of 18 living with them, 80.5% were married couples living together, 3.0% had a female householder with no husband present, and 13.5% were non-families. 10.9% of all households were made up of individuals, and 3.0% had someone living alone who was 65 years of age or older. The average household size was 3.06 and the average family size was 3.32.

In the town, the population was spread out, with 30.8% under the age of 18, 6.8% from 18 to 24, 30.1% from 25 to 44, 23.7% from 45 to 64, and 8.5% who were 65 years of age or older. The median age was 35 years. For every 100 females, there were 110.6 males. For every 100 females age 18 and over, there were 116.1 males.

The median income for a household in the town was $60,167, and the median income for a family was $62,000. Males had a median income of $40,234 versus $24,205 for females. The per capita income for the town was $20,117. About 0.9% of families and 0.8% of the population were below the poverty line, including none of those under the age of eighteen or sixty-five or over.
