= Statue of Liberty (disambiguation) =

The Statue of Liberty is a colossal statue in New York Harbor, New York City, United States.

The Statue of Liberty may also refer to:

== Other statues ==
- Liberty Statue (Budapest), a monument on the Gellért Hill in Budapest, Hungary
- Statue of Liberty (Leicester), a small replica of the Statue of Liberty installed at the Soar River bridges in Leicester
- Statue of Liberty (Mytilene), a bronze statue erected at the harbor of Mytilene, on the island of Lesbos, in Greece
- Statue of Liberty (Seattle), a replica of the Statue of Liberty installed at Alki Beach Park, Seattle, Washington, U.S.
- Statue of Liberty (Vaasa), a bronze statue erected at the Market Square of Vaasa, in Finland
- Statue of Liberty (Lima), a bronze statue located at the Plaza Francia of Lima, Peru
- Statua della Libertà, a statue located at the Piazza della Libertà in the City of San Marino.
- Replicas of the Statue of Liberty

== Other uses ==
- Statue of Liberty (juggling), a juggling pattern variant of the shower pattern
- "Statue of Liberty" (song), a 1978 song by XTC
- Statue of Liberty Bike, a bespoke Orange County Choppers motorcycle dedicated to the statue and freedom, that incorporates artifacts and materials from the statue
- Statue of Liberty Division, a U.S. Army unit
- Statue of Liberty Museum
- Statue of Liberty National Monument, New Jersey and New York, United States
- Statue of Liberty Nebula, a nickname for NGC 3576
- Statue of Liberty play, a trick play in American football
- The Statue of Liberty (film), a 1985 American documentary
- Working on the Statue of Liberty, a 1946 painting by Norman Rockwell

== See also ==
- Freedom Monument (disambiguation)
- Goddess of Democracy, Tiananmen Square, Beijing, China (1989)
- Lady Liberty (disambiguation)
- Liberty Island
- Monument of Liberty (disambiguation)
- Statue of Freedom, Washington, D.C., United States
- Statue of Liberty in popular culture
