= Marche, Arkansas =

- Unincorporated community
- Location in Arkansas
- Coordinates: 34°51′48″N 92°21′45″W
- Country: United States
- State: Arkansas
- County: Pulaski
- Elevation: 269 ft (82 m)
- Time zone: UTC-6 (Central (CST))
  - Summer (DST): UTC-5 (CDT)
- ZIP code: 72113, 72118
- GNIS feature ID: 77596

Marche (sometimes also called Warren) is an unincorporated community in Pulaski County, Arkansas, United States. It lies 12 miles (19 km) north of Little Rock.

== History ==
Marche traces its roots back to an attempt by Judge Liberty Bartlett to establish a settlement in 1872. The settlement, which would have been named Bartlett Springs, did not succeed, and the Little Rock and Fort Smith Railroad acquired the property and named it Warren Station. A plan to turn the area into a resort for residents of Little Rock had failed by 1877.

The 22,000-acre (89 km^{2}; 34 sq mi) parcel of land was subsequently purchased by Count Timothy von Choinski, a Polish nobleman with plans to settle the land and set up farms for Polish immigrants. He had become concerned with the living conditions of Poles in the slums of large cities such as New York and Chicago, and wanted to improve their living conditions while restoring the agricultural environment that had been the mode of life for most Poles before their arrival in America. He purchased the site in March 1877, and named it Marche (French for "marketplace").

Twenty-two immigrants visited the site with Choinski in May, and agreed to settle half of it. Various groups of Poles started settling the land the summer of that year. Some returned when they discovered that the land had not yet been cleared, but eighty-five remained as the nucleus of a new settlement. By fall of 1878, the new community had attracted the attention of the Holy Ghost Fathers, a congregation of Roman Catholic priests and brothers. Father Anthony Jaworski built a small chapel named for the Immaculate Heart of Mary on a hill that the immigrants called Jasna Góra after the important pilgrimage site in Częstochowa. A larger building was constructed in 1896, though it was destroyed by fire in 1932; a replacement was dedicated in May 1933.

Though the expansion of a federal camp in World War II required forty families to relocate, the community continued to expand. The population in 1941 was 72. The Immaculate Heart of Mary Church completed a parish center in 1999, and the church continues to celebrate Karnawał in celebration of the community's Polish heritage.
