= Liberty Safe =

American safe manufacturer

Coordinates: 40°02′37″N 111°45′10″W

Liberty Safe and Security Products Inc.
- Type: Private
- Traded as: Trader
- Industry: Gun Safe and Security Products, Manufacturer
- Founded: 1988
- Founder: Jay Crosby
- Headquarters: Payson, Utah, United States
- Products: Safes, gun safes, home safes, commercial safes Liberty Safes, National Security, Centurion
- Owner: Monomoy Capital Partners (acquired in 2021)
- Website: www.libertysafe.com

Liberty Safe and Security Products, Inc., doing business as Liberty Safe, is a residential and commercial safe manufacturer located in Payson, Utah, United States.

== Company ==
Founded in 1988, Liberty Safe began operating out of a single storage unit. Over the past 30 years, the company has grown from a small facility to a 205,000 square foot facility in Payson, Utah, and can produce more than 500 safes a day. As of 2018, they claim to have sold over 2 million safes during this first 30 years of operation. The company employs over 350 people.

Liberty Safe manufactures and markets gun safes (for gun safety), home safes, commercial safes (including depository safes), fire safes and related accessories. Liberty Safe manufactures and sells products having the Liberty Safe, National Security, Centurion and Freedom Security brands. Other private label brands include Cabela's, Remington, and John Deere.

The company bases its fire testing on standards developed by the U.S. Department of Commerce National Institute of Standards and Technology (NIST). Liberty Safe fire testing includes certifying products for a high degree of heat over a long period of time. Liberty Safe primarily designs and manufactures gun, home, fire and commercial safes. Liberty Safe but also operates under the names the National Security, Fatboy, and Colt Brands.

In July 2018, Liberty Safe was recognized by the White House and invited to its “Made in America” event. CEO and President Steve Allred, along with the Vice President of Sales and Marketing, Justin Buck, both attended. The two showcased Liberty's Presidential 50, the company's top-of-the-line safe. The company products are sold through independent dealers and retailers throughout the United States and other countries including Belgium, Canada, Great Britain, Iceland, Kazakhstan, and Norway. These dealers range from full service safe dealerships to locksmiths, home improvement, sporting goods, farm equipment, and other various retailers and businesses.

Liberty Safe offers a free transferable lifetime warranty on their UL rated safes that includes replacement of the safe in case of fire, or attempted break in.

== FBI access controversy ==
On August 30, 2023, Liberty Safe faced backlash over backdoor access provided to law enforcement agencies, including the FBI. The controversy arose when it was revealed that the company had granted access codes to the FBI upon receiving valid warrants to search the property of an Arkansas resident involved in the January 6 United States Capitol attack. In a statement released on the company's official social media accounts, Liberty Safe stated that they had no prior knowledge of the specifics of the investigations when providing the access codes. This incident sparked online backlash and threats of boycotts about Liberty Safe's ability and willingness to provide law enforcement backdoor access to their safes.

== See also ==
- Safe
- Gun safes
- Gun safety
- Home security
- Physical security
