= Liberty Bartlett =

American circuit Judge

Liberty Bartlett (1810 – March 17, 1893) was an American circuit judge in Arkansas.

Bartlett was born in 1810 in Williamstown, Massachusetts. He lived in California for a time, and later moved to Arkansas. He became a circuit judge of the fifth circuit in Little Rock on November 12, 1854.

Judge Bartlett attempted to establish a settlement in 1872, at the present site of Marche, Arkansas. The settlement, which would have been named Bartlett Springs, did not succeed, and the Little Rock and Fort Smith Railroad ended up acquiring the property and naming it Warren Station. It was later named Marche, and settled by Polish immigrants.

Bartlett was reported to have lived to "extreme old age."
