= West Liberty, Missouri =

Unincorporated community in Missouri, United States

Coordinates: 40.486958°N 93.131043°W

West Liberty is an extinct town in section 27 of southern Sherman Township in Putnam County, in the U.S. state of Missouri.

West Liberty was platted in 1855 as "Liberty", but as there was already another Liberty, Missouri the name was soon prefixed "West" in order to avoid repetition. A post office was established at West Liberty in 1855, and remained in operation until 1908. A post office in Delpha in section 1 of eastern Sherman Township established in 1891 also closed in 1908. The St. John post office also closed in 1908.
