= Tulamben =

Village in Karangasem, Bali Province, Indonesia

Coordinates: 8°16′39″S 115°35′33″E

Tulamben is a small fishing village on the north-east coast of Bali. It is among the most popular dive sites on Bali since the wreck of the Liberty, a US Army Transport ship torpedoed by a Japanese submarine in 1942 lies just off shore. During high-season, up to 100 divers descend to the wreck each day.

== History ==
The town's name is derived from the word batulambih, which roughly translates as "many stones", a reference to the destructive eruptions by Mount Agung that have affected this part of Bali from time to time. The beach in Tulamben is not made of sand, but is entirely covered with fairly large, smooth stones. The modern name evolved over time, first to "Batulamben" and finally settling on the contraction Tulamben ("batu" means "stone" in Indonesian).

== Diving ==
The best conditions for diving here are during October and November, when the weather is generally calm and during the start of southeast monsoon, which typically extends from May to July. In addition to a wide variety of corals and invertebrates on the wreck itself, large fish frequent the wreck in some seasons, most popularly Mola mola and whale sharks, as well as Black-tip reef sharks. Professional divers have praised local residents for minimizing local fishing activity.

The boat wreck

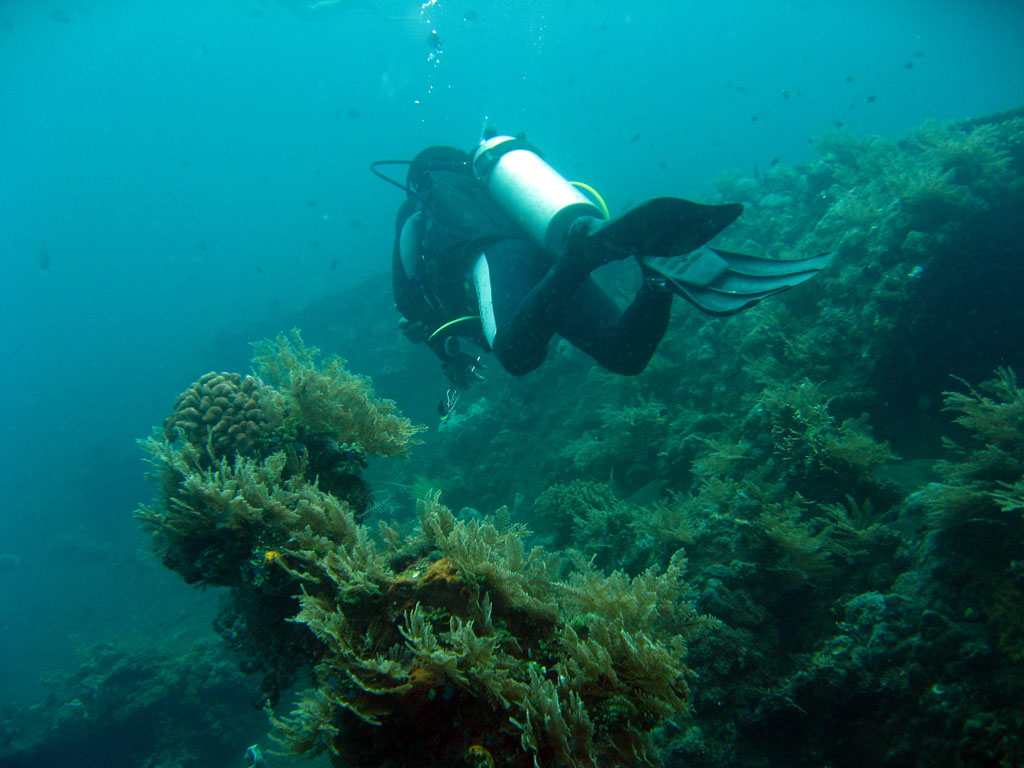
Scuba diving along the USAT Liberty wreck in Tulamben Bali, Indonesia.

The wreck of the USAT Liberty lies in shallow water and is considered appropriate for divers of all certification levels. The ship rests in 30 metres of water, is roughly 25 metres from shore and can be reached with a short swim from the beach. The highest point of the wreck tops out about 5 metres from the surface. The ship was torpedoed by the Japanese off the nearby Island of Lombok and the ship was towed to the beach at Tulamben for salvage operations. The 1963 eruption of Mt. Agung, which devastated much of the eastern side of Bali, drove the ship into the water just off shore, where it became encrusted with coral and a home to other sea life.

Underwater temple

A small Pura or Balinese Hindu temple sits underwater off the coast at a depth of 15 metres.
