= Liberty Tree (disambiguation) =

The Liberty Tree (1646–1775) was a famous elm tree that stood in Boston, Massachusetts in the years before the American Revolution.

Liberty Tree or Tree of Liberty can also refer to:

- Tree of Liberty (symbol), a symbol of the French Revolution
- Liberty pole or Tree of Liberty, a wooden pole which served as a similar symbol of freedom
- Liberty Tree District, a historic district in Boston
- Liberty Tree Mall, shopping mall in Danvers, Massachusetts
- Jefferson's Tree of Liberty, 2008 album by Jefferson Starship
- Tree of Liberty (newspaper), published in Pittsburgh in the early 1800s
- The Tree of Liberty, a book by Elizabeth Page that served as a basis for 1940 the American film, The Howards of Virginia
