= Liberty City =

Liberty City may refer to:

== Places ==
- Liberty City (Miami), a neighborhood of Miami
- Liberty City, Texas, a neighborhood of Kilgore, Texas, and census-designated place

== Media ==
- Liberty City, a fictional city based on New York City, in the Grand Theft Auto video game series
- Grand Theft Auto: Liberty City Stories, an installment of the Grand Theft Auto computer and video game series
- Grand Theft Auto: Episodes from Liberty City, the collective name for Grand Theft Auto IV: The Lost and Damned and Grand Theft Auto: The Ballad of Gay Tony, both paid downloadable content for Grand Theft Auto IV

== Other uses ==
- "Liberty City", a composition by Jaco Pastorius from his 1981 album, Word of Mouth

== See also ==
- Liberty, Kansas, in Montgomery County
- Liberty, Kentucky, in Casey County
- Liberty, Missouri, in Clay County
- Liberty, Texas, county seat of Liberty County
