= Liberty (1784 ship) =

History

Great Britain
- Name: Liberty
- Builder: Broadstairs
- Launched: 1784
- Fate: Burnt 9 March 1805

General characteristics
- Tons burthen: 260, or 264, or 400 (bm)
- Armament: 2 × 6-pounder guns

Liberty was built at Broadstairs in 1784 as a West Indiaman. She made one voyage to the West Indies for the British East India Company (EIC) in 1795. A French squadron burnt her at Montserrat in 1805

== Career ==
Liberty first appeared in Lloyd's Register (LR) in 1784 with R. Carey, master, Blackman, owner, and trade London–Barbados. The entry also showed her as "British" built.

Year	Master	Owner	Trade	Source & notes
1785	R. Carey	J. Blackman	London–Barbados	LR
1790	Carey	Blackman	London–Barbados	LR
1795	Carey	Blackman	London–Barbados	LR

In 1795 Captain Richard Carey sailed Liberty to the West Indies on a voyage for the EIC. Liberty sailed from Dunnose, Isle of Wight, on 25 May, and arrived at Barbados on 25 July. She was at St Eustatia on 2 August, and arrived back at Portsmouth on 3 October. The reason for the voyage on behalf of the EIC is obscure.

Year	Master	Owner	Trade	Source & notes
1797	R. Carey; W. Merriton	Blackman; Captain	London–Barbados; London-Grenada	LR
1799	Merriton; Jn. Litson	Captain & Co.	London–Barbados	LR
1800	J. Litson	"Bawii & Co."	London–Barbados	LR; good repair in 1799g
1800	J. Ledson	Lester & Co.	London–Barbados	Register of Shipping (RS); good repair 1799;
1805	J. Litsen; Heppinstal	Bawbrook	London–Montserrat	LR;Small repairs 1801 & 1804
1805	Heppinstal	Boddington	London–Montserrat	RS; repairs 1801 & good repair 1804

== Fate ==
On 9 March 1805 a French squadron from Rochefort burnt Liberty, of London, Heppinstal, master, Hamilton, Derbyshire, master, and Sarah, of Liverpool, Jacks, master, at Montserrat.
