= Krzysztof Wójcik (politician) =

Polish politician

President of Bytom
- In office 1998–2006
- Preceded by: Marek Kińczyk
- Succeeded by: Piotr Koj

Personal details
- Born: 16 October 1958 Bytom, People's Republic of Poland
- Party: Democratic Left Alliance
- Profession: Teacher

Krzysztof Stefan Wójcik [kʐɨʂtɔf stɛfan vujt͡sik] (born 16 October 1958 in Bytom, Poland) is a Polish politician, teacher, president of Bytom from 1998 to 2006.

== Biography ==
He graduated from political sciences on University of Silesia. In period of PRL he acted in PZPR. In 1990 he joined SdRP, and in 1999 SLD. He presided civic structures of these parties.

From 1994 he was councilman of the town for two cadences, he was vice-president of education. After Polish local elections in 1998 the town council chose him as a president of Bytom. In Polish local elections in 2002 he was reelected.

In Polish local elections in 2006 he took the third place, but he got into the second round because of resignation of Janusz Paczocha, but he lost and Piotr Koj won the elections.

He has a wife and two children.
