= Liberty Stadium (disambiguation) =

Liberty Stadium is the former name of the Swansea.com Stadium in Swansea, Wales

Liberty Stadium may also refer to:

- Liberty Stadium (Ibadan), Nigeria
- Liberty Stadium (Salonta), Romania

== See also ==
- Liberty Bank Stadium, Des Moines, Iowa, United States
- Liberty Bowl Memorial Stadium, Memphis, Tennessee, United States
- Liberty Way, stadium in Nuneaton, Warwickshire, England, United Kingdom
