= Mount Liberty, Ohio =

Unincorporated community in Ohio, U.S.

Coordinates: 40°20′48″N 82°37′49″W

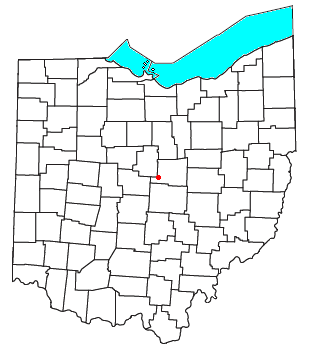
Location of Mount Liberty in Ohio

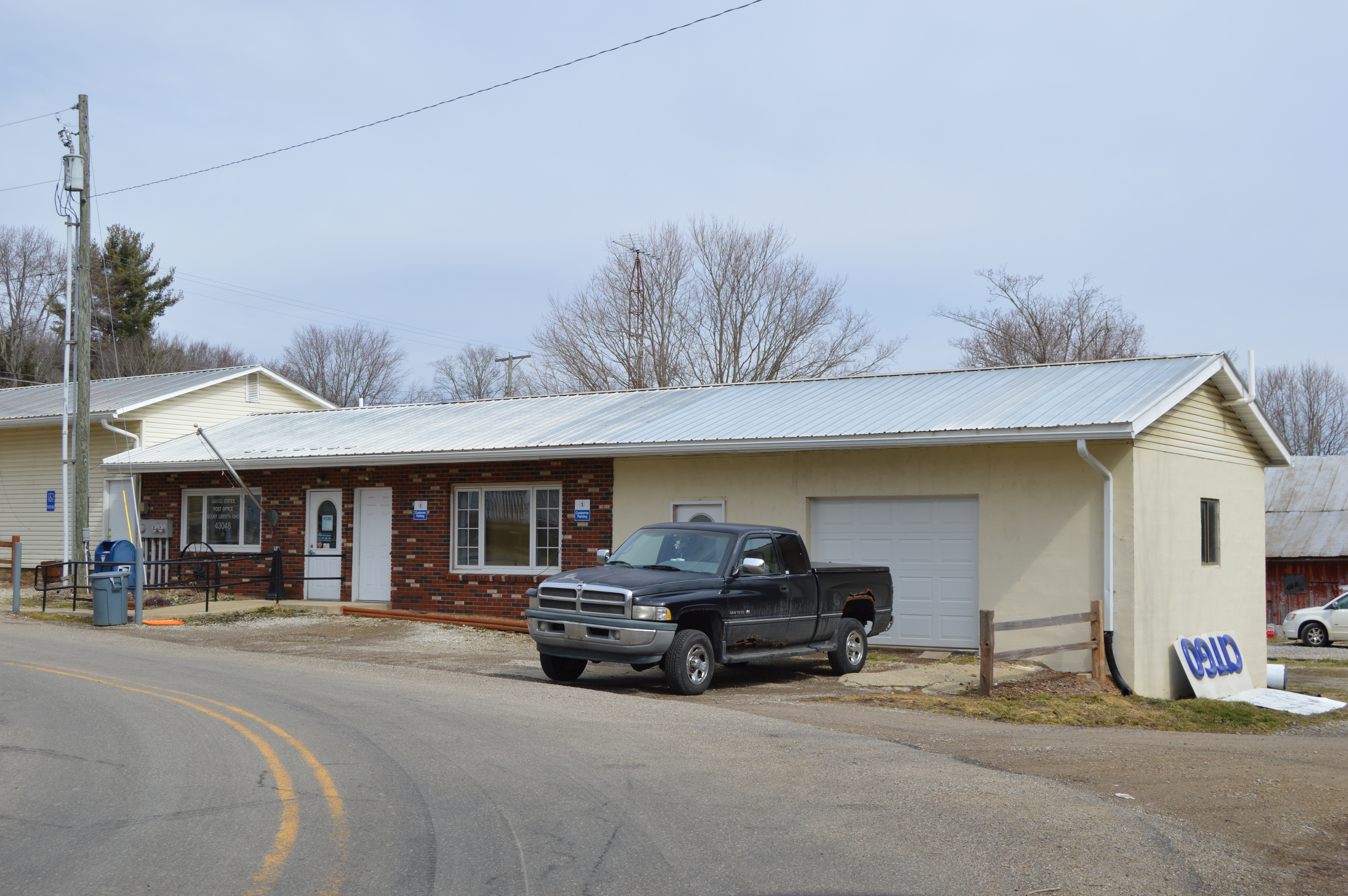
Community post office

Mount Liberty is an unincorporated community on the border between the Milford and Liberty Townships of Knox County, Ohio, United States. It has a post office with the ZIP code 43048. It lies along the concurrent U.S. Route 36 and State Route 3.

== History ==
Mount Liberty was laid out in 1835. The community was named for the lofty elevation of the town site, and for its location within Liberty Township. A post office called Mount Liberty has been in operation since 1838. Besides the post office, Mount Liberty had a station on the Cleveland Akron, and Columbus Railroad.
