= Goddess of Liberty =

Goddess of Liberty may refer to:

- Libertas the ancient Roman goddess of liberty
- Liberty (personification), the personification of Liberty
  - Statue of Liberty (Liberty Enlightening the World), a colossal statue in New York harbor sculpted by Frédéric Auguste Bartholdi, sometimes called the Goddess of Liberty
- Goddess of Liberty (Georgia State Capitol), now known as Miss Freedom, a statue atop the capitol dome
- Goddess of Liberty (Texas State Capitol), a statue by Elijah E. Myers atop the capitol dome
- Goddess of Liberty (Tiananmen Square) or Goddess of Democracy, a statue created during the Tiananmen Square protests of 1989
- Goddess of Liberty, a statue atop the Soldiers and Sailors monument in Allentown, Pennsylvania

== See also ==
- Lady Liberty (disambiguation)
- Liberty (disambiguation)
