= Liberty Barnes =

American sociologist

Liberty Walther Barnes
- Born: Fort Leavenworth, Kansas, U.S.
- Occupation(s): Author, sociologist
- Website: libertybarnes.com

Liberty Walther Barnes is an American sociologist, ethnographer, and writer. She holds affiliations at the University of Cambridge in the United Kingdom and the University of Oregon in the United States. Trained in medical sociology and gender studies, Barnes's research examines how medical authorities serve as cultural authorities on family building, fatherhood, motherhood, and childhood.

== Personal life and education ==
Barnes was born in Fort Leavenworth, Kansas, and raised in Federal Way, Washington. She is the daughter of Larry Walther and Kathryn Walther (née Hiersche) and the oldest of five children. Barnes graduated from Federal Way High School in 1993 and earned a B.A. in media arts from Brigham Young University (1999). She completed MA and PhD degrees in sociology from the University of California at San Diego (2005, 2011).

== Career ==
Barnes is the author of Conceiving Masculinity: Male Infertility, Medicine, and Identity (Temple University Press 2014), based on ethnographic observations in infertility clinics, laboratories, and medical conferences and interviews with medical practitioners and patients. In 2015, Barnes was awarded the Book of the Year Prize by the Foundation for the Sociology of Health and Illness for "making the most significant contribution to the sub-discipline of medical sociology." Previous winners of the prize include Nelly Oudshoorn, Annemarie Mol, and Margaret Lock.

Barnes's research has been featured by several media websites, including TheAtlantic.com, NBCNews.com, ABCNews.com, Slate.com, TheGuardian.com, and TheTelegraph.com. She has been interviewed by Texas Public Radio, WHYY Philadelphia, and Voice of Russia UK.

In 2014 a TEDx talk given by Barnes was featured as an "Editor's Pick" on the TEDx homepage. The same year Barnes received a Future Research Leaders Award from the Economic and Social Research Council in the UK.

In 2016, Barnes received a grant from the National Science Foundation's Division of Social and Economic Sciences to write an ethnography of children's medicine.

Barnes has taught sociology courses at the University of Cambridge, Pacific University, Brigham Young University, University of California at San Diego, and Portland Community College.
