= Liberty Township, Pennsylvania =

Liberty Township is the name of some places in the U.S. state of Pennsylvania:

- Liberty Township, Adams County, Pennsylvania
- Liberty Township, Allegheny County, Pennsylvania, a former township annexed by Pittsburgh
- Liberty Township, Bedford County, Pennsylvania
- Liberty Township, Centre County, Pennsylvania
- Liberty Township, McKean County, Pennsylvania
- Liberty Township, Mercer County, Pennsylvania
- Liberty Township, Montour County, Pennsylvania
- Liberty Township, Susquehanna County, Pennsylvania
- Liberty Township, Tioga County, Pennsylvania
