= Liberty Lady =

American bomber of World War II

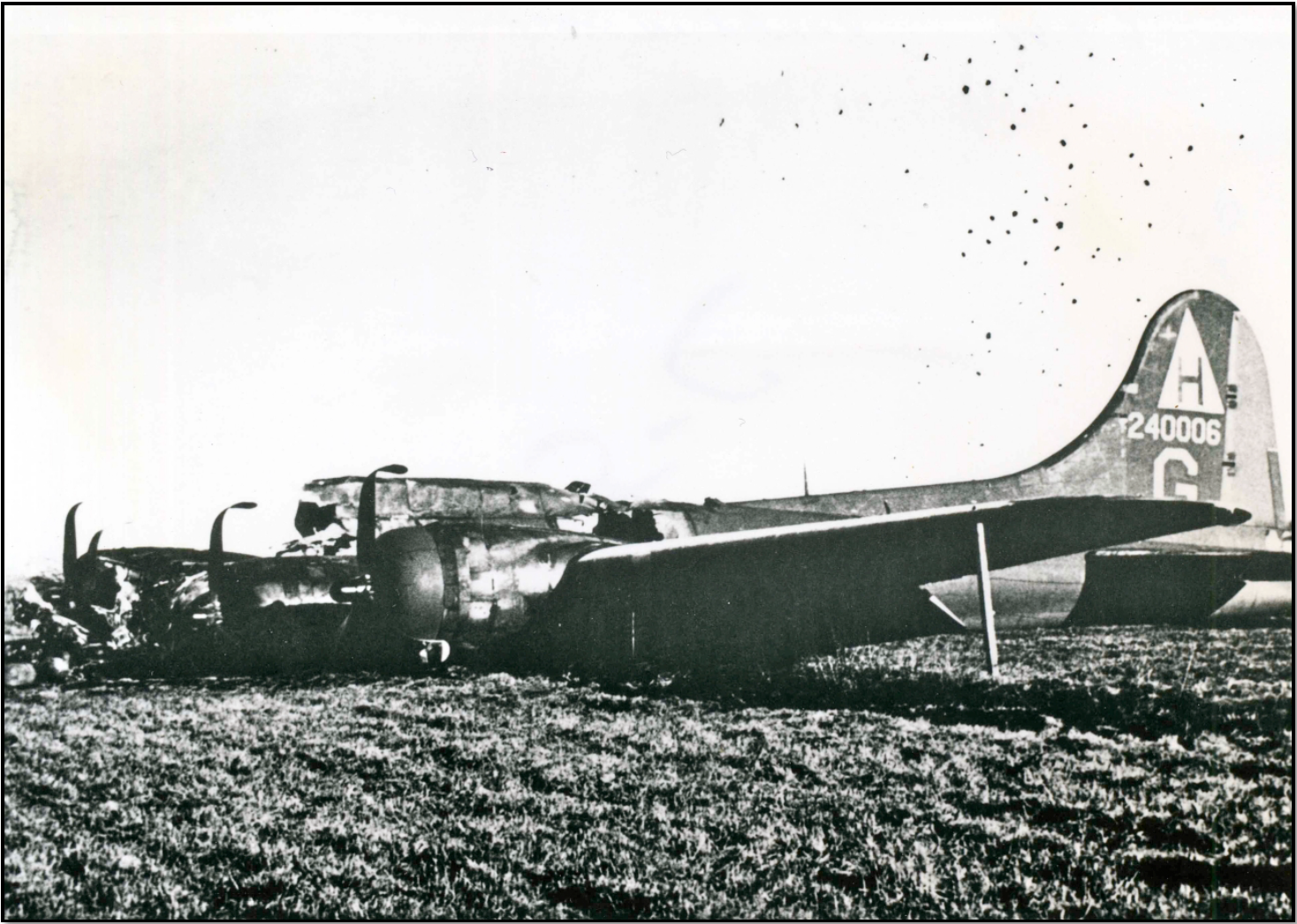
- Liberty Lady after the post-crash fire

Occurrence
- Date: March 6, 1944 (82 years ago)
- Summary: Crash landing due to flak damage
- Site: Mästermyr, Gotland, Sweden

Aircraft
- Aircraft type: Boeing B-17G Flying Fortress
- Aircraft name: Liberty Lady
- Operator: United States Army Air Forces (USAAF)
- Registration: 42-40006
- Flight origin: RAF Thurleigh, England
- Destination: Erkner, Germany (intended)
- Crew: 10
- Fatalities: 0
- Survivors: 10

Liberty Lady was an American bomber aircraft of the type Boeing B-17G Flying Fortress. The aircraft crash-landed on the island of Gotland, Sweden, on March 6, 1944, after a 16-hour mission.

A book was published in 2016 containing the complete story of its final mission, fate and aftermath.

== Background ==
On July 24, 1943, an American B-17F, named Georgia Rebel, belly-landed near Årjäng, Sweden. This aircraft was the first of a total of 68 B-17s to seek refuge in Sweden during World War II.

Liberty Lady was built by Vega Aircraft Corporation in California as a B-17G, part of production block B-17G-10-VE, and assigned serial number 42-40006. (Note: Liberty Lady should not be confused with a similarly named B-17F, Lady Liberty with serial number 42-29807, that crashed in the Netherlands in August 1943 after sustaining flak damage.) The plane was delivered to the U.S. military in November 1943, and assigned to the 368th Bombardment Squadron of the 306th Bombardment Group within the Eighth Air Force, stationed at Thurleigh near Bedford, England, in January 1944.

== Liberty Lady during World War II ==
Liberty Lady participated in the first daylight bombing raid on Berlin on March 6, 1944. The formation of 730 bombers took off that morning to bomb a ball bearing factory in Erkner, on the eastern outskirts of Berlin.

During the mission, Liberty Lady was hit by anti-aircraft artillery over central Berlin. One engine and a fuel tank were damaged. Following the incident, Liberty Lady changed course to the north instead of returning westward towards England.

Around 4 p.m., the aircraft was observed over the island of Öland, part of neutral Sweden, and it crash-landed at Mästermyr west of Hemse, approximately 45 kilometres (28 mi) south of Visby on Gotland. Unsure of their location, the crew set fire to the aircraft, a standard procedure following landings in enemy-controlled areas.

The crew consisted of:

- Pilot: 1st Lt. Charles W. Smith
- Co-pilot: 1st Lt. Merle P. Brown
- Navigator: 1st Lt. Stanley N. Buck
- Bombardier / nose gunner: 1st Lt. Herman F. Allen
- Flight engineer / top turret gunner: T/Sgt. Carl A. Heuser
- Radio operator: T/Sgt. Victor R. Marcotte
- Ball turret gunner: S/Sgt. Thomas E. Stillson Jr.
- Right waist gunner: S/Sgt. Donald S. Courson
- Left waist gunner: Sgt. Joseph R. Paul
- Tail gunner: S/Sgt. R. B. Trumble

The day after the emergency landing, the 10-man crew was transported to the Swedish mainland and then to the American internment camp in Rättvik. During their internment, American aircrews held in neutral Sweden were the subject of an article, "Swedish Stopover", which appeared in the August 26, 1944, issue of Collier's magazine. One photo featured Liberty Lady navigator Stanley N. Buck (misidentified as "Bock") at a dinner function with two Swedish women. The article, which included multiple photos of airmen enjoying various leisure activities, caused some controversy including with General Henry H. Arnold, given the contrast between the idyllic images and the fate of other aircrews in combat.

== Aftermath ==
Albin Larsson, a workshop owner and member of the Swedish Home Guard in Hemse, was the first to arrive at the crash site. He later purchased the wreckage for 250 kronor (excluding the engines). The wing beams were repurposed as roof trusses in Hemse and Havdhem.

Crew member Herman F. Allen was interned and began working for his country's espionage agency, the Office of Strategic Services (OSS). He later married Hedvig Jonsson (an American of Swedish descent) in the Gustaf Vasa Church in Stockholm in January 1945; the wedding was attended by Count Folke Bernadotte. Allen died in 2011, aged 94; he was predeceased by his wife, who died in 2007 at age 86. In 2016, a book was published about the crash—entitled Liberty Lady: A True Story of Love and Espionage in WWII Sweden, it was written by a daughter of the Allens.

== See also ==
- 1944 Örnahusen B-17 Flying Fortress crash
