= Liberty, Wisconsin =

Liberty is the name of some places in the U.S. state of Wisconsin:

- Liberty, Grant County, Wisconsin, a town
- Liberty, Manitowoc County, Wisconsin, a town
- Liberty, Outagamie County, Wisconsin, a town
- Liberty, Vernon County, Wisconsin, a town
- Liberty (community), Wisconsin, an unincorporated community in Vernon County

== See also ==
- Liberty Pole, Wisconsin, an unincorporated community
