= SS Liberty (1890) =

History
- Name: SS Liberty
- Operator: 1890–1905: Co-operative Wholesale Society Limited; 1905–1922: Lancashire and Yorkshire Railway; 1922–1923: London and North Western Railway; 1923–1931: London, Midland and Scottish Railway
- Port of registry: (United Kingdom)
- Builder: Earle's Shipbuilding, Hull
- Launched: 13 January 1890
- Fate: Scrapped December 1931

General characteristics
- Tonnage: 895 gross register tons (GRT)
- Length: 225 feet (69 m)
- Beam: 33 feet (10 m)
- Depth: 13.9 feet (4.2 m)

SS Liberty was a freight vessel built for the Co-operative Wholesale Society Limited in 1888.

== History ==
She was built by Earle's Shipbuilding for the Co-operative Wholesale Society and launched on 13 January 1890 by Mrs. Taylor of Manchester.

In December 1891 she went ashore in Cuxhaven, but was floated free and continued to Hamburg. On Wednesday 14 February 1894, she rescued the Wilson liner SS Plato which had sprung a leak in a hurricane and was in danger of sinking. She towed the vessel into Hull. On 29 November 1901 she collided off Brough Haven with the sloop Friend which was carrying a cargo of barley. The sloop sank, but the crew were saved.

She was obtained in 1905 by the Lancashire and Yorkshire Railway

In 1922 she was taken over by the London and North Western Railway, and in 1923 the London, Midland and Scottish Railway. She was eventually scrapped in December 1931 at Sunderland.
