= USAT Liberty =

United States Army cargo ship

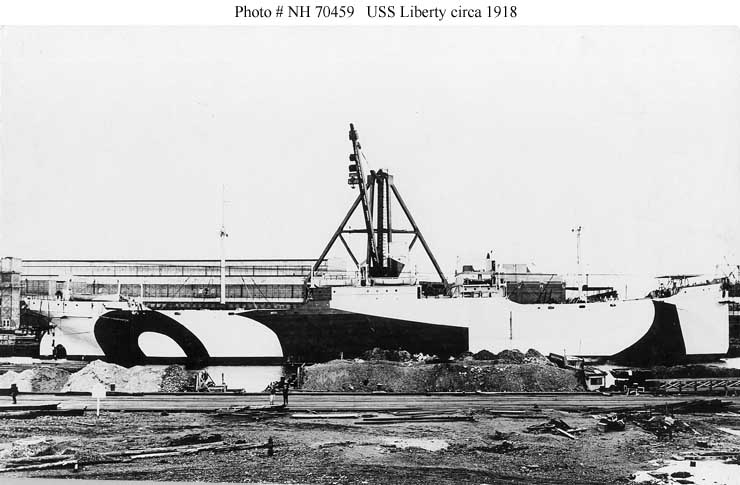
- USS Liberty (ID # 3461) Fitting out at the yard of her builder, the Federal Shipbuilding Co., Kearny, New Jersey, circa September 1918. This freighter was in commission from October 1918 to May 1919.

History

United States
- Name: Liberty
- Builder: Federal Shipbuilding; Kearny, New Jersey
- Yard number: 1
- Launched: 19 June 1918
- Commissioned: 7 October 1918
- Decommissioned: 7 May 1919
- Fate: Beached, 11 January 1942

General characteristics
- Displacement: 13,130 tons
- Length: 411 ft 6 in (125.43 m)
- Beam: 55 ft (17 m)
- Draft: 26 ft 6 in (8.08 m)
- Speed: 11 knots (20 km/h)
- Complement: 70
- Armament: 1 × 6" gun, 1 × 3" gun

USAT Liberty was a United States Army cargo ship torpedoed by I-66 in January 1942 and beached on the island of Bali, Indonesia. She had been built as a Design 1037 ship for the United States Shipping Board in World War I and had served in the United States Navy in that war as animal transport USS Liberty (ID-3461). She was also notable as the first ship constructed at Federal Shipbuilding, Kearny, New Jersey. In 1963 a volcanic eruption moved the ship off the beach, and Liberty's wreck is now a popular dive site.

== World War I ==
Liberty was launched on 19 June 1918 by the Federal Shipbuilding Company in Kearny, New Jersey, and acquired by the United States Navy on 7 October 1918 and commissioned the same day. Assigned to the Naval Overseas Transportation Service, Liberty departed the New York Navy Yard on 24 October 1918, arriving at Brest, France, with her cargo of horses on 8 November. Over the next 6 months, Liberty made two additional cruises from New York to France discharging both animal and general cargo at French ports. Loaded with 436 tons of U.S. Army cargo and 2,072 tons of steel rails, Liberty arrived at Newport News, Virginia, on 30 April 1919 from her final cruise. She was decommissioned there on 7 May and was returned to the United States Shipping Board the same day.

== Between the wars ==
On 20 October 1929, Liberty collided with the French tug Dogue at Le Havre, Seine Maritime, France. Dogue sank with the loss of two crew members.

On 23 November 1933, Liberty collided with the American cargo ship Ohioan in the Ambrose Channel. Ohioan was consequently beached near the West Bank Light.

== World War II ==
By 1939, Liberty—although owned by the United States Maritime Commission (a successor to the USSB)—was employed by the Southgate-Nelson Corporation of Norfolk, Virginia. Southgate-Nelson was the operator of several packet lines, including the American Hampton Roads Line, the Yankee Line, and the Oriole Lines, but secondary sources do not indicate for which of these services Liberty sailed. In November 1940, Liberty was one of ten ships taken up by the United States Army for defense service. (Note: The other nine ships taken up by the United States Army were Chirikof, Etolin, West Corum, Waukegan, Edenton, West Segovia, America, President Roosevelt, and President Jefferson. (see ref #4))

At the time of the United States' entry into World War II in December 1941, USAT Liberty was in the Pacific. In January 1942, she was en route from Australia to the Philippines with a cargo of railway parts and rubber. On 11 January, Liberty was torpedoed by I-66 about 10 nautical miles (19 km) southwest of the Lombok Strait, near position 08°54′S 115°28′E. US destroyer Paul Jones and Dutch destroyer Van Ghent took the damaged ship in tow attempting to reach Celukan bawang harbour at Singaraja, the Dutch port and administrative centre for the Lesser Sunda Islands, on the north coast of Bali. However she was taking too much water and so was beached on the eastern shore of Bali at Tulamben so that the cargo and fittings could be salvaged.

In 1963 the tremors associated with the eruption of Mount Agung caused the vessel to slip off the beach, and she now lies on a sand slope in 25 to 100 feet (7.6 to 30.5 m) of water, providing one of the most popular dive sites off Bali.

The wreck of USAT Liberty is often misidentified as USAT Liberty Glo (Note: SS Liberty Glo was a Hog Islander built at the end of World War I, but survived World War II to be scrapped in Baltimore, Maryland, in November 1950.) or identified by its former name, USS Liberty. The wreck is sometimes incorrectly referred to as a Liberty ship, through confusion of the ship's name with the class of World War II-built standard design cargo ships.

== Dive site ==
Liberty′s wreck rests about 40 metres (130 ft) from the beach in Tulamben, Bali, Indonesia. The highest point of the wreck is the stern at a depth of about 5 metres (16 ft) and the lowest point sits at about 30 metres (100 ft). Coral formations can be observed on the wreck's guns.

It is also beside a species-rich zone called "Coral Garden" (depth 4-25 m).

== Gallery of wreck pictures ==
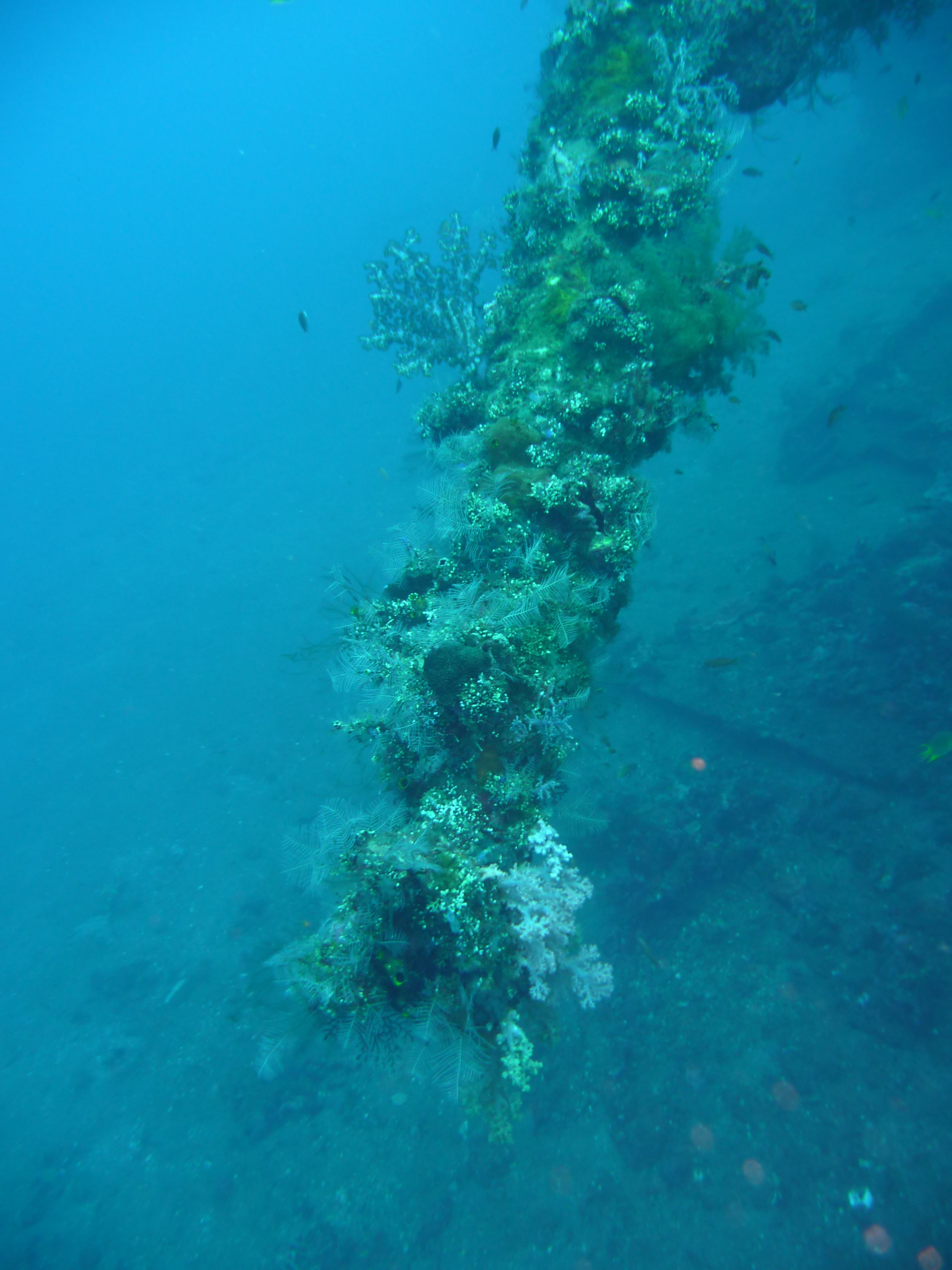
front 6-inch-gun

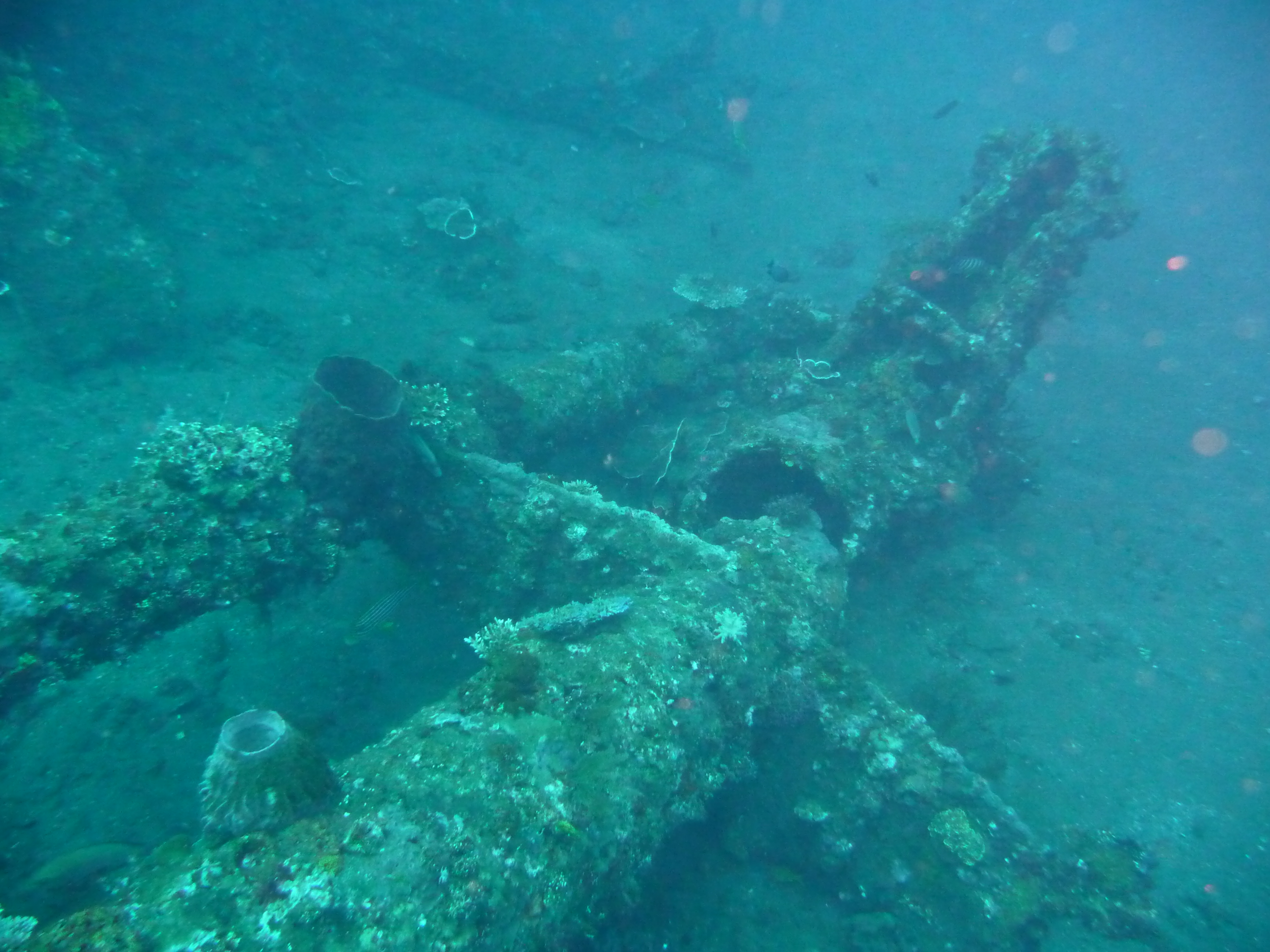
loading boom

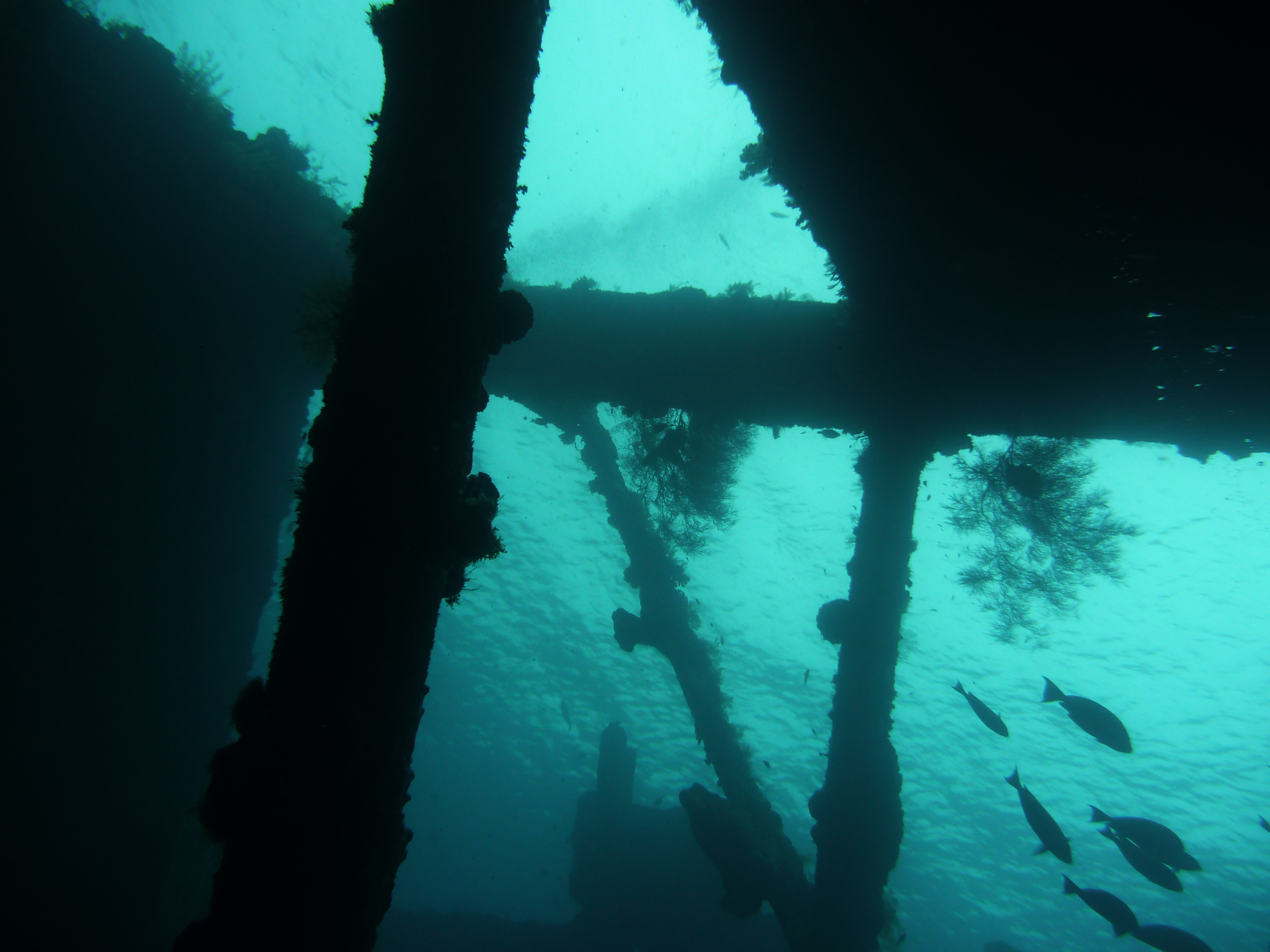
partly collapsed hold

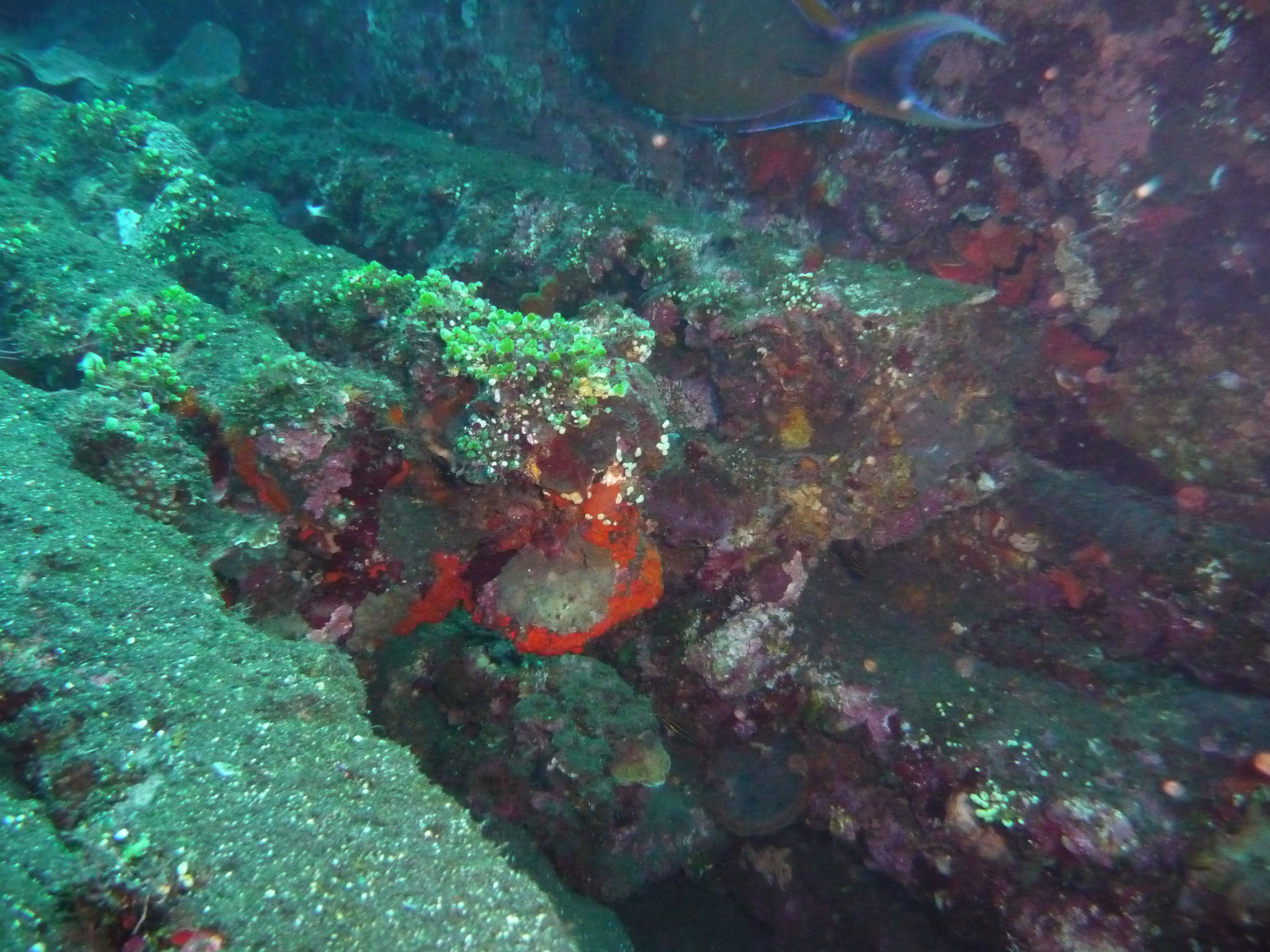
rail profiles heavily covered by corals

== General and cited references ==
- Jordan, Roger W. (1999). The World's Merchant Fleets, 1939: The Particulars and Wartime Fates of 6,000 Ships. London: Chatham. p. 383. ISBN 1-86176-023-X.
