= UK Independence Party representation and election results =

This article lists the election results and representation of the UK Independence Party (UKIP) with respect to the House of Commons, Scottish Parliament, Senedd (Welsh Parliament), Northern Ireland Assembly, London Assembly and European Parliament.

For results of elections contested by the Anti-Federalist League, UKIP's predecessor, see Anti-Federalist League election results.

== House of Commons elections ==
UKIP has no Members of Parliament in the House of Commons. The party first had representation for a period in 2008 when Dr Bob Spink, the MP for Castle Point, resigned from the Conservative Party and joined UKIP on 21 April 2008. However, by November 2008, Spink had left UKIP, and in any case subsequently lost his seat to the Conservatives in the 2010 general election.

Douglas Carswell, the MP for Clacton, and Mark Reckless, the MP for Rochester and Strood, resigned from the Conservative Party to join UKIP on 28 August and 27 September 2014, respectively, and resigned their seats shortly thereafter. Carswell and Reckless won subsequent by-elections held on 9 October and 20 November 2014. Carswell was re-elected at the 2015 general election, but Reckless was not, the seat being re-taken by the Conservatives. Carswell thus became the only person so far to win a seat for UKIP in a general election, but left UKIP to sit as an independent MP on 25 March 2017. On 6 April 2017, Reckless—by now sitting in the Welsh Assembly, having been elected there in 2016—also left UKIP to sit with the Conservative group in the Assembly, although he had not yet officially rejoined his old party.

=== General elections ===
Year	Candidates	Number of votes	Seats	Deposits saved	% Total vote	% Vote in contested seats	Winner
1992 (Note: As Anti-Federalist League)	17	4,383	0	0	0.01	0.53	Conservative
1997	194	106,028	0	1	0.34	1.06	Labour
2001	428	390,575	0	6	1.48	2.16	Labour
2005	496	603,298	0	38	2.20	2.80	Labour
2010	572	919,546	0	99	3.10	3.45	Hung Parliament
2015	614	3,881,129	1	541	12.64	13.15	Conservative
2017	378	593,852	0	40	1.84		Hung Parliament
2019	44	22,817	0	0	0.07		Conservative
2024	26	6,530	0	1	0.03		Labour

=== By-elections ===
Below are UKIP's results for the Westminster by-elections in which it competed for each period.

==== 1992–97 ====
Constituency	Date	Candidate	Number of votes	% of votes	Position	Winner
Barnsley East	12 December 1996	Count Nikolai Tolstoy	378	2.1	5th of 6	Labour
South East Staffordshire	11 April 1996	A. Smith	1,272	2.9	4th of 13	Labour
Hemsworth	1 February 1996	Peter Davies	455	2.1	6th of 10	Labour
Barking	9 June 1994	Gerard Batten	406	2.1	5th of 6	Labour
Dagenham	9 June 1994	Peter Compobassi	457	2.1	5th of 6	Labour
Eastleigh	9 June 1994	Nigel Farage	952	1.7	4th of 6	Liberal Democrats
Newham North East	9 June 1994	Anthony Scholefield	509	2.6	4th of 7	Labour
Dudley West	15 December 1994	Malcolm Floyd	590	1.4	4th of 10	Labour
Islwyn	16 February 1995	Hugh Moelwyn Hughes	289	1.2	6th of 7	Labour
Perth and Kinross	25 May 1995	Vivian Linacre	504	1.2	6th of 9	SNP
Littleborough and Saddleworth	27 July 1995	John Whittaker	549	1.3	5th of 10	Liberal Democrats
Wirral South	27 February 1997	Richard North	410	0.9	4th of 12	Labour

==== 1997–2001 ====
Constituency	Date	Candidate	Number of votes	% of votes	Position	Winner
Uxbridge	31 July 1997	James Feisenberger	39	0.1	10th of 11	Conservative
Winchester	20 November 1997	Robin Page	521	1.0	4th of 8	Liberal Democrats
Leeds Central	10 June 1999	Raymond Northgreaves	353	2.7	5th of 7	Labour
Hamilton South	23 September 1999	Alistair McConnachie	61	0.3	10th of 12	Labour
Wigan	23 September 1999	John Whittaker	834	5.2	4th of 9	Labour
Kensington and Chelsea	25 November 1999	Damian Hockney	450	2.3	5th of 18	Conservative
Ceredigion	3 February 2000	John Bufton	487	1.9	5th of 7	Plaid Cymru
Romsey	4 May 2000	Garry Rankin-Moore	901	2.3	4th of 6	Liberal Democrats
Tottenham	22 June 2000	Ashwinkumar Tanna	136	0.8	7th of 8	Labour
Preston	23 November 2000	Gregg Beaman	458	2.1	5th of 9	Labour
West Bromwich West	23 November 2000	Jonathan Oakton	246	1.3	5th of 5	Labour

==== 2001–05 ====
Constituency	Date	Candidate	Number of votes	% of votes	Position	Winner
Ipswich	22 November 2001	Jonathan Wright	276	1.0	5th of 9	Labour
Brent East	18 September 2003	Brian Hall	140	0.6	10th of 16	Liberal Democrats
Hartlepool	30 September 2004	Stephen Allison	3,193	10.2	3rd of 14	Labour

==== 2005–10 ====
Constituency	Date	Candidate	Number of votes	% of votes	Position	Winner
Livingston	29 September 2005	Peter Adams	108	0.4	7th of 10	Labour
Dunfermline and West Fife	9 February 2006	Ian Borland	208	0.6	8th of 9	Liberal Democrats
Bromley and Chislehurst	29 June 2006	Nigel Farage	2,347	8.1	3rd of 11	Conservative
Ealing Southall	19 July 2007	K. T. Rajan	285	0.8	6th of 12	Labour
Sedgefield	19 July 2007	Toby Horton	536	1.9	6th of 11	Labour
Crewe and Nantwich	22 May 2008	Mike Nattrass	922	2.2	4th of 10	Conservative
Henley	26 June 2008	Chris Adams	843	2.4	6th of 12	Conservative
Glenrothes	6 November 2008	Kris Seunarine	117	0.3	7th of 8	Labour
Norwich North	23 July 2009	Glenn Tingle	4,068	11.8	4th of 12	Conservative

==== 2010–15 ====
Constituency	Date	Candidate	Number of votes	% of votes	Position	Winner
Oldham East & Saddleworth	13 January 2011	Paul Nuttall	2,029	5.8	4th of 10	Labour
Barnsley Central	3 March 2011	Jane Collins	2,953	12.2	2nd of 9	Labour
Leicester South	5 May 2011	Abhijit Pandya	994	2.9	4th of 5	Labour
Inverclyde	30 June 2011	Mitch Sorbie	288	1.0	5th of 5	Labour
Feltham & Heston	15 December 2011	Andrew Charalambous	1,276	5.5	4th of 9	Labour
Bradford West	29 March 2012	Sonja McNally	1,085	3.3	5th of 8	Respect
Cardiff South and Penarth	15 November 2012	Simon Zeigler	1,179	6.1	5th of 8	Labour
Corby	15 November 2012	Margot Parker	5,108	14.3	3rd of 14	Labour
Manchester Central	15 November 2012	Chris Cassidy	749	4.5	4th of 12	Labour
Croydon North	29 November 2012	Winston McKenzie	1,400	5.7	3rd of 12	Labour
Middlesbrough	29 November 2012	Richard Elvin	1,990	11.8	2nd of 8	Labour
Rotherham	29 November 2012	Jane Collins	4,648	21.7	2nd of 11	Labour
Eastleigh	28 February 2013	Diane James	11,571	27.8	2nd of 14	Liberal Democrats
South Shields	2 May 2013	Richard Elvin	5,998	24.2	2nd of 9	Labour
Wythenshawe and Sale East	13 February 2014	John Bickley	4,301	18.0	2nd of 7	Labour
Newark	5 June 2014	Roger Helmer	10,028	25.9	2nd of 11	Conservative
Clacton	9 October 2014	Douglas Carswell	21,113	59.7	1st of 8	UKIP
Heywood and Middleton	9 October 2014	John Bickley	11,016	38.7	2nd of 5	Labour
Rochester and Strood	20 November 2014	Mark Reckless	16,867	42.1	1st of 13	UKIP

==== 2015–17 ====
Constituency	Date	Candidate	Number of votes	% of votes	Position	Winner
Oldham West and Royton	3 December 2015	John Bickley	6,487	23.4	2nd of 6	Labour
Sheffield Brightside and Hillsborough	5 May 2016	Steven Winstone	4,497	19.9	2nd of 7	Labour
Ogmore	5 May 2016	Glenda Davies	3,808	16.2	2nd of 5	Labour
Tooting	16 June 2016	Elizabeth Jones	507	1.6	5th of 14	Labour
Witney	20 October 2016	Kenrick "Dickie" Bird	1,354	3.5	5th of 14	Conservative
Sleaford and North Hykeham	8 December 2016	Victoria Ayling	4,426	13.5	2nd of 10	Conservative
Copeland	23 February 2017	Fiona Mills	2,025	6.5	4th of 7	Conservative
Stoke-on-Trent Central	23 February 2017	Paul Nuttall	5,233	24.7	2nd of 10	Labour

==== 2017–19 ====
Constituency	Date	Candidate	Number of votes	% of votes	Position	Winner
Lewisham East	14 June 2018	David Kurten	380	1.7	6th of 14	Labour
Newport West	4 April 2019	Neil Hamilton	2,023	8.6	3rd of 11	Labour
Peterborough	6 June 2019	John Whitby	400	1.2	6th of 15	Labour
Brecon and Radnorshire	1 August 2019	Liz Phillips	242	0.8	6th of 6	Liberal Democrats

==== 2019–24 ====
Constituency	Date	Candidate	Number of votes	% of votes	Position	Winner
Airdrie and Shotts	13 May 2021	Donald Mackay	39	0.2	8th of 8	SNP
Batley and Spen	1 July 2021	Jack Thomson	151	0.4	7th of 16	Labour
Old Bexley and Sidcup	2 December 2021	John Poynton	184	0.8	7th of 11	Conservative
North Shropshire	16 December 2021	Andrea Allen	378	1.0	6th of 14	Liberal Democrats
Southend West	3 February 2022	Steve Laws	400	2.7	3rd of 9	Conservative
Tiverton and Honiton	23 June 2022	Ben Walker	241	0.6	6th of 8	Liberal Democrats
Wakefield	23 June 2022	Jordan Gaskell	124	0.5	13th of 15	Labour
City of Chester	1 December 2022	Cain Griffiths	179	0.6	7th of 9	Labour
Somerton and Frome	20 July 2023	Peter Richardson	275	0.7	7th of 8	Liberal Democrats
Uxbridge and South Ruislip	20 July 2023	Rebecca Jane	61	0.2	14th of 17	Conservative
Tamworth	19 October 2023	Robert Bilcliff	436	1.7	5th of 9	Labour
Kingswood	15 February 2024	Nicholas Wood	129	0.5	6th of 6	Labour

== European Parliament elections ==
Year	Number of votes	% of vote	Seats	Position	Winner
1994	150,251	1.0	0	8th	Labour
1999	696,057	7	3	4th	Conservative
2004	2,650,768	16	12	3rd	Conservative
2009	2,498,226	17	13	2nd	Conservative
2014	4,352,251	27.5	24	1st	UKIP
2019	554,463	3.2	0	8th	Brexit Party

== Scottish Parliament elections ==
=== General elections ===
Year	Number of votes	% Vote	+/-	Seats	+/-	Winner
2007	8,197	0.40	N/A	0	N/A	SNP
2011	18,138	0.91	+0.51	0	±0	SNP
2016	46,426	2.00	+1.09	0	±0	SNP
2021	3,848	0.14	-1.86	0	±0	SNP

=== By-elections ===
==== 2000–present ====
Constituency	Date	Candidate	Number of votes	% of votes	Position	Winner
Ayr	16 March 2000	Alistair McConnachie	113	0.4	8th	Conservative
Glasgow Cathcart	29 September 2005	Bryan McCormack	54	0.4	9th	Labour
Aberdeen Donside	20 June 2013	Otto Inglis	1,128	4.8	5th	SNP
Dunfermline	24 October 2013	Peter Adams	908	3.8	5th	Labour
Cowdenbeath	23 January 2014	Denise Baykal	610	3.0	4th	Labour
Shetland	29 August 2019	Stuart Martin	60	0.5	9th	Liberal Democrats
Hamilton, Larkhall and Stonehouse	5 June 2025	Janice Mackay	50	0.2	10th	Labour

== Welsh Assembly/Senedd elections ==
UKIP had seven members elected to the Welsh Assembly at the 2016 election. Following multiple defections, there was only one UKIP Assembly member (now Member of the Senedd, MS) by the time of the 2021 Senedd election:

- Neil Hamilton

Nathan Gill was elected in 2016, but left the Assembly group later that year to sit as an Independent. Mark Reckless was elected in 2016, but defected to the Welsh Conservative Party in 2017. Caroline Jones resigned from the party in 2018. Several former UKIP Assembly members moved to the Brexit Party in 2019. On 7 Nov 19 Gareth Bennett became an independent member, until 24 June 2020, as he later joined the Abolish the Welsh Assembly Party, a single-issue anti-Welsh Devolution party.

No UKIP MSs were elected in the 2021 Senedd election, with the party's sole surviving MS, Neil Hamilton failing to be re-elected.

=== Assembly/Senedd elections ===
Year	Number of Votes	% Vote	+/-	Seats	+/-	Winner
2003	19,795	2.3	N/A	0	N/A	Labour
2007	38,490	4.0	+1.7	0	±0	Labour
2011	43,756	4.6	+0.6	0	±0	Labour
2016	132,138	13.0	+8.4	7	+7	Labour
2021	8,586	1.6	-11.4	0	-7	Labour

=== By-elections ===
==== 2001–present ====
Constituency	Date	Candidate	Number of votes	% of votes	Position	Winner
Swansea East	27 September 2001	Tim Jenkins	243	1.9	5th	Labour
Ynys Môn	1 August 2013	Nathan Gill	3,099	14.3	3rd	Plaid Cymru
Caerphilly	23 October 2025	Roger Quilliam	79	0.2	8th	Plaid Cymru

== Northern Ireland Assembly elections ==
Year	Number of votes	% of vote	+/-	Seats	+/-	Winner
2007	1,229	0.2	N/A	0	N/A	DUP
2011	4,152	0.6	+0.4	0	±0	DUP
2016	10,109	1.5	+0.8	0	±0	DUP
2017	1,579	0.2	-1.3	0	±0	DUP

== London Assembly elections ==
The London Assembly is elected using both first-past-the-post constituencies and a London-wide list using the D'Hondt method of proportional representation. At the 2004 election (held on the same day as elections to the European Parliament), UKIP won two of the London-wide seats, although both members subsequently defected to Veritas and contested the 2008 election as the One London party. UKIP did not have representation in the assembly again until the 2016 election in which it won two seats. Both their Assembly members, Peter Whittle and David Kurten, left the party in December 2018. UKIP lost both their seats at the 2021 election after finishing ninth on the London-wide list.

Year	Number of FPTP votes	% FPTP vote	Number of top-up votes	% Top-up vote	Seats	+/-	Winner
2000	2,115	0.1	34,054	2.0	0	±0	Conservative/Labour
2004	180,516	10.0	156,780	8.2	2	+2	Conservative
2008	71,984	3.0	46,617	1.9	0	-2	Conservative
2012	95,849	4.3	100,040	4.5	0	±0	Labour
2016	197,448	7.6	171,069	6.5	2	+2	Labour
2021	n/a		27,114	1.0	0	-2	Labour

== London Mayoral elections ==
Year	Candidate	Number of votes	% of vote	Position	Winner
2000	Damian Hockney	16,324	1.0	8th	Independent
2004	Frank Maloney	115,666	6.2	4th	Labour
2008	Gerard Batten	22,422	1.2	7th	Conservative
2012	Lawrence Webb	43,274	2.0	7th	Conservative
2016	Peter Whittle	94,373	3.6	5th	Labour
2021	Peter Gammons	14,393	0.6	13th	Labour

== See also ==
- Reform UK election results
- Brexit Party election results
