= Brexit Party election results =

UK political party election results

The Brexit Party (known since 2021 as Reform UK) stood in the following UK parliamentary elections and elections to the European Parliament in 2019.

== European elections, 2019 ==
The Brexit Party stood in the 2019 European Parliament elections in every regional constituency except Northern Ireland and won the highest number of seats and the most votes nationwide.

2019 European Parliament election in the United Kingdom: Great Britain
| Year | Leader | Number of votes | Share of votes | Seats | Change | Position |
|---|---|---|---|---|---|---|
| 2019 | Nigel Farage | 5,248,533 | 30.52% | 29 / 73 | New | 1st |

Results by country/region (left) and by local authority areas (right)

=== Results by regional constituency ===
The Brexit Party won at least one seat in every region that they stood in. The party topped the poll in the majority of districts in Great Britain.

2019 European Parliament election in the United Kingdom
| European Parliament constituency | Number of votes | Share of votes | Seats | Change | Position | Elected members | Image of regional results |
|---|---|---|---|---|---|---|---|
| East Midlands | 452,321 | 38.23% | 3 / 5 | New | 1st | Annunziata Rees-Mogg, Jonathan Bullock and Matthew Patten | |
| East of England | 604,715 | 37.83% | 3 / 7 | New | 1st | Richard Tice, Michael Heaver and June Mummery | |
| London | 400,257 | 17.9% | 2 / 8 | New | 3rd | Benyamin Habib and Lance Forman | |
| North East England | 240,056 | 38.73% | 2 / 3 | New | 1st | Brian Monteith and John Tennant | |
| North West England | 541,843 | 31.23% | 3 / 8 | New | 1st | Claire Fox, Henrik Overgaard-Nielsen and David Bull | |
| Scotland | 233,006 | 14.8 | 1 / 6 | New | 2nd | Louis Stedman-Bryce | |
| South East England | 915,686 | 36.07% | 4 / 10 | New | 1st | Nigel Farage, Alexandra Phillips, Robert Rowland and Belinda de Lucy | |
| South West England including Gibraltar | 611,742 | 36.84% | 3 / 6 | New | 1st | Ann Widdecombe, James Glancy and Christina Jordan | |
| Wales | 271,404 | 32.5% | 2 / 4 | New | 1st | Nathan Gill and James Wells | |
| West Midlands | 507,152 | 37.66% | 3 / 7 | New | 1st | Rupert Lowe, Martin Daubney and Andrew England Kerr | |
| Yorkshire and the Humber | 470,351 | 36.5% | 3 / 6 | New | 1st | John Longworth, Lucy Harris and Jake Pugh | |

=== Gibraltar ===
For elections to the European Parliament, the British Overseas Territory of Gibraltar was a part of the European Parliament constituency combined region of South West England, but votes were counted separately. The table below shows the results of the European Parliament election in Gibraltar.

| Date of election | Votes | % |
|---|---|---|
| 2019 | 746 | 8.0 |

== By-elections, 2019 ==
| Date of election | Constituency | Candidate | Votes | % | Elected MP | Ref |
|---|---|---|---|---|---|---|
| 6 June 2019 | Peterborough, Cambridgeshire | Mike Greene | 9,801 | 28.89 | Lisa Forbes (Labour) | |
| 1 August 2019 | Brecon and Radnorshire, Mid Wales | Des Parkinson | 3,331 | 10.47 | Jane Dodds (Liberal Democrat) | |

== General election ==
| Election | Leader | Votes | | Seats | | Outcome |
| Election | Leader | No. | Share | Seats won | ± | Outcome |
|---|---|---|---|---|---|---|
| 2019 | Nigel Farage | 644,257 | 2.0 | 0 / 650 | N/A | Extraparliamentary |
| 2024 | Nigel Farage | 4,117,221 | 14.3 | 5 / 650 | ▲5 | Opposition |

=== General election, 2019 ===
Constituencies which the Brexit Party contested at the election.

In April 2019, party leader Nigel Farage said the Brexit Party intended to stand candidates at the next general election. The same month, he promised not to stand candidates against the 28 Eurosceptic Conservative MPs who opposed the Brexit withdrawal agreement in Parliament.

When a general election was held in December 2019, the Brexit Party stood in around half of the total seats in England, Scotland and Wales, campaigning most strongly in the red wall (seats long held by Labour Members of Parliament). The party did not stand in seats won by the Conservative Party in 2017 along with a number of exceptional seats; mainly in London, Scotland and the North East. A number of candidates who had been selected to stand in Conservative constituencies went on to run in the election as independent candidates on a Pro-Brexit platform.

As largely expected, the Brexit Party failed to win any seats in the general election. Among its results the best were in Barnsley Central, where Victoria Felton came second with 30.4% of the vote; Hartlepool, where party chairman Richard Tice came third with 25.8% of the vote; and Hull West and Hessle, where businesswoman and media personality Michelle Dewberry came third with 18% of the vote.

=== Results by constituency ===
| Constituency | Region | 2016 Brexit vote (%) | Winning party in 2017 | Winning party in 2019 | Candidate | Votes | % | Position | Margin with winner |
|---|---|---|---|---|---|---|---|---|---|
| Aberavon | South Wales | 59.9 | Labour | Labour | Glenda Davies | 3,108 | 9.8 | 3rd | 44.0 |
| Aberdeen North | Aberdeenshire, Scotland | 43.0 | Scottish National | Scottish National | Seb Leslie | 1,008 | 2.7 | 5th | 51.3 |
| Alyn and Deeside | North Wales | 57.7 | Labour | Labour | Simon Wall | 2,678 | 6.2 | 3rd | 36.3 |
| Arfon | North Wales | 34.9 | Plaid Cymru | Plaid Cymru | Gary Gribben | 1,159 | 4.0 | 4th | 41.2 |
| Ashfield | Nottinghamshire, East Midlands | 70.5 | Labour | Conservative | Martin Daubney | 2,501 | 5.1 | 4th | 34.2 |
| Ashton-under-Lyne | Greater Manchester, North West | 61.8 | Labour | Labour | Derek Brocklehurst | 3,151 | 8.2 | 3rd | 39.9 |
| Barking | London (East) | 60.3 | Labour | Labour | Karen Batley | 3,186 | 7.2 | 3rd | 54.0 |
| Barnsley Central | South Yorkshire | 68.3 | Labour | Labour | Victoria Felton | 11,233 | 30.4 | 2nd | 9.7 |
| Barnsley East | South Yorkshire | 70.7 | Labour | Labour | Jim Ferguson | 11,112 | 29.2 | 2nd | 8.4 |
| Barrow and Furness | Cumbria, North West | 56.7 | Labour | Conservative | Ged McGrath | 1,355 | 2.9 | 4th | 49.0 |
| Bath | Somerset, South West | 31.6 | Liberal Democrat | Liberal Democrat | Jimi Ogunnusi | 642 | 1.2 | 4th | 53.3 |
| Bassetlaw | Nottinghamshire, East Midlands | 68.3 | Labour | Conservative | Debbie Soloman | 5,366 | 10.6 | 3rd | 44.6 |
| Battersea | London (West) | 23.0 | Labour | Labour | Jake Thomas | 386 | 0.6 | 5th | 44.9 |
| Batley and Spen | West Yorkshire | 60.3 | Labour | Labour | Clive Minihan | 1,678 | 3.2 | 5th | 39.5 |
| Bedford | Bedfordshire, East of England | 51.9 | Labour | Labour | Charles Bunker | 896 | 1.9 | 5th | 41.4 |
| Bermondsey and Old Southwark | London (South) | 27.0 | Labour | Labour | Alex Matthews | 1,617 | 2.8 | 4th | 51.3 |
| Bethnal Green and Bow | London (North) | 30.9 | Labour | Labour | David Axe | 1,081 | 1.8 | 5th | 70.9 |
| Birkenhead | Merseyside, North West | 51.7 | Labour | Labour | Darren Lythgoe | 1,489 | 3.5 | 5th | 55.5 |
| Birmingham, Edgbaston | Birmingham, West Midlands | 47.3 | Labour | Labour | David Wilks | 1,047 | 2.5 | 5th | 47.6 |
| Birmingham, Erdington | Birmingham, West Midlands | 63.0 | Labour | Labour | Wendy Garcarz | 1,441 | 4.1 | 3rd | 46.2 |
| Birmingham, Hall Green | Birmingham, West Midlands | 33.6 | Labour | Labour | Rosie Cuckston | 877 | 1.7 | 5th | 66.1 |
| Birmingham, Hodge Hill | Birmingham, West Midlands | 51.5 | Labour | Labour | Jill Dagnan | 1,519 | 3.4 | 3rd | 75.3 |
| Birmingham, Ladywood | Birmingham, West Midlands | 35.6 | Labour | Labour | Andrew Garcarz | 831 | 1.9 | 5th | 77.3 |
| Birmingham, Northfield | Birmingham, West Midlands | 61.8 | Labour | Conservative | Keith Rowe | 1,655 | 3.8 | 4th | 42.5 |
| Birmingham, Perry Barr | Birmingham, West Midlands | 51.2 | Labour | Labour | Annette Willcox | 1,382 | 3.3 | 4th | 59.8 |
| Birmingham, Selly Oak | Birmingham, West Midlands | 46.9 | Labour | Labour | Joseph Tawonezvi | 1,436 | 2.9 | 5th | 53.1 |
| Birmingham, Yardley | Birmingham, West Midlands | 60.1 | Labour | Labour | Mary McKenna | 2,246 | 5.3 | 4th | 49.5 |
| Bishop Auckland | County Durham, North East | 60.6 | Labour | Conservative | Nicholas Brown | 2,500 | 5.6 | 3rd | 48.1 |
| Blackburn | Lancashire, North West | 53.7 | Labour | Labour | Rick Moore | 2,770 | 6.2 | 3rd | 58.7 |
| Blackley and Broughton | Greater Manchester, North West | 51.3 | Labour | Labour | James Buckley | 2,736 | 7.1 | 3rd | 54.8 |
| Blackpool South | Lancashire, North West | 67.8 | Labour | Conservative | David Brown | 2,009 | 6.1 | 3rd | 43.5 |
| Blaenau Gwent | South Wales | 62.0 | Labour | Labour | Richard Taylor | 6,215 | 20.6 | 2nd | 28.6 |
| Blaydon | County Durham, North East | 56.3 | Labour | Labour | Michael Robinson | 5,833 | 12.8 | 3rd | 30.5 |
| Blyth Valley | Northumberland, North East | 59.8 | Labour | Conservative | Mark Peart | 3,394 | 8.3 | 3rd | 34.4 |
| Bolsover | Derbyshire, East Midlands | 70.2 | Labour | Conservative | Kevin Harper | 4,151 | 9.0 | 3rd | 38.4 |
| Bolton North East | Greater Manchester, North West | 57.7 | Labour | Conservative | Trevor Jones | 1,880 | 4.3 | 3rd | 41.1 |
| Bolton South East | Greater Manchester, North West | 63.4 | Labour | Labour | Mark Cunningham | 2,968 | 7.3 | 3rd | 45.7 |
| Bootle | Merseyside, North West England | 54.8 | Labour | Labour | Kim Knight | 2,610 | 5.3 | 3rd | 74.1 |
| Bradford East | West Yorkshire | 55.2 | Labour | Labour | Jonathan Barras | 2,700 | 6.1 | 4th | 56.9 |
| Bradford South | West Yorkshire | 63.5 | Labour | Labour | Kulvinder Manik | 2,819 | 7.1 | 3rd | 39.2 |
| Bradford West | West Yorkshire | 46.7 | Labour | Labour | Derrick Hodgson | 1,556 | 3.5 | 3rd | 72.7 |
| Brent North | London (West) | 43.0 | Labour | Labour | Suzie O'Brien | 951 | 1.8 | 4th | 50.1 |
| Brentford and Isleworth | London (West) | 43.3 | Labour | Labour | Lucy O'Sullivan | 1,165 | 2.0 | 5th | 48.2 |
| Bridgend | South Wales | 49.6 | Labour | Conservative | Robert Morgan | 1,811 | 4.3 | 5th | 38.8 |
| Brighton, Kemptown | East Sussex, South East England | 43.4 | Labour | Labour | Graham Cushway | 1,327 | 2.7 | 5th | 48.9 |
| Brighton, Pavilion | East Sussex, South East England | 26.6 | Green | Green | Richard Milton | 770 | 1.3 | 4th | 55.9 |
| Bristol East | Bristol, South West England | 46.8 | Labour | Labour | Tim Page | 1,881 | 3.6 | 5th | 49.5 |
| Bristol South | Bristol, South West England | 47.1 | Labour | Labour | Robert de Vito Boutin | 2,325 | 4.2 | 5th | 46.3 |
| Bristol West | Bristol, South West England | 20.7 | Labour | Labour | Neil Hipkiss | 869 | 1.2 | 4th | 61.1 |
| Buckingham | Buckinghamshire, South East England | 48.6 | Labour | Labour | Andrew Bell | 1,286 | 2.0 | 4th | 56.4 |
| Burnley | Lancashire, North West | 66.6 | Labour | Conservative | Stewart Scott | 3,362 | 8.6 | 4th | 31.7 |
| Bury North | Greater Manchester, North West | 53.6 | Labour | Conservative | Alan McCarthy | 1,240 | 2.6 | 4th | 43.6 |
| Bury South | Greater Manchester, North West | 54.5 | Labour | Conservative | Andrea Livesey | 1,672 | 3.3 | 4th | 40.5 |
| Caerphilly | South Wales | 55.1 | Labour | Labour | Nathan Gill | 4,490 | 11.2 | 4th | 33.7 |
| Caithness, Sutherland and Easter Ross | Highlands, Scotland | 49.4 | Liberal Democrat | Liberal Democrat | Sandra Skinner | 1,139 | 3.6 | 5th | 33.6 |
| Camberwell and Peckham | London (South) | 30.1 | Labour | Labour | Claude Cass-Horne | 1,041 | 1.8 | 5th | 69.5 |
| Cambridge | Cambridgeshire, East of England | 26.2 | Labour | Labour | Peter Dawe | 1,041 | 1.9 | 5th | 46.1 |
| Cardiff Central | South Wales | 30.3 | Labour | Labour | Gareth Pearce | 1,006 | 2.4 | 4th | 58.8 |
| Cardiff North | South Wales | 39.0 | Labour | Labour | Chris Butler | 1,311 | 2.5 | 5th | 47 |
| Cardiff South and Penarth | South Wales | 44.9 | Labour | Labour | Tim Price | 1,999 | 4.0 | 5th | 40.1 |
| Cardiff West | South Wales | 44.8 | Labour | Labour | Nick Mullins | 1,619 | 3.5 | 5th | 48.3 |
| Carmarthenshire East and Dinefwr | South Wales | 53.7 | Plaid Cymru | Plaid Cymru | Peter Prosser | 2,311 | 5.6 | 4th | 33.3 |
| Carshalton and Wallington | London (South) | 56.3 | Liberal Democrat | Conservative | James Woudhuysen | 1,043 | 2.1 | 4th | 40.3 |
| Ceredigion | South Wales | 45.4 | Plaid Cymru | Plaid Cymru | Gethin James | 2,063 | 5.1 | 5th | 32.8 |
| Chesterfield | Derbyshire, East Midlands | 59.3 | Labour | Labour | John Scotting | 4,771 | 10.6 | 3rd | 29.6 |
| Chorley | Lancashire, North West | 56.5 | Labour | Speaker | Mark Brexit-Smith* | 9,439 | 23.7 | 2nd | 43.6 |
| City of Chester | Cheshire, North West | 42.7 | Labour | Labour | Andy Argyle | 1,388 | 2.5 | 5th | 47.1 |
| City of Durham | County Durham, North East | 44.3 | Labour | Labour | Lesley Wright | 3,252 | 6.7 | 4th | 35.3 |
| Clwyd South | North Wales | 60.2 | Labour | Conservative | Jamie Adams | 1,468 | 4.0 | 5th | 40.7 |
| Colne Valley | West Yorkshire | 49.8 | Labour | Conservative | Sue Harrison | 1,286 | 2.1 | 4th | 46.3 |
| Coventry North East | Warwickshire, West Midlands | 59.2 | Labour | Labour | Iddrisu Sufyan | 2,110 | 4.7 | 3rd | 48.0 |
| Coventry North West | Warwickshire, West Midlands | 58.6 | Labour | Labour | Joshua Richardson | 1,956 | 3.0 | 4th | 40.8 |
| Coventry South | Warwickshire, West Midlands | 48.9 | Labour | Labour | James Crocker | 1,432 | 3.2 | 4th | 41.2 |
| Crewe and Nantwich | Cheshire, North West | 59.0 | Labour | Conservative | Matt Wood | 1,390 | 2.6 | 4th | 50.5 |
| Croydon Central | London (South) | 50.3 | Labour | Labour | Peter Sonnex | 999 | 1.8 | 5th | 48.4 |
| Croydon North | London (South) | 40.9 | Labour | Labour | Chidi Ngwaba | 839 | 1.5 | 5th | 64.1 |
| Cynon Valley | South Wales | 56.9 | Labour | Labour | Rebecca Rees-Evans | 3,045 | 10.1 | 3rd | 41.3 |
| Dagenham and Rainham | London (East) | 69.9 | Labour | Labour | Tom Bewick | 2,887 | 6.6 | 3rd | 37.9 |
| Darlington | County Durham, North East | 58.0 | Labour | Conservative | Dave Mawson | 1,544 | 3.5 | 4th | 44.6 |
| Delyn | North Wales | 54.7 | Labour | Conservative | Nigel Williams | 1,971 | 5.1 | 4th | 38.6 |
| Denton and Reddish | Greater Manchester, North West | 61.0 | Labour | Labour | Martin Power | 3,039 | 7.9 | 3rd | 42.2 |
| Derby North | Derbyshire, East Midlands | 53.7 | Labour | Conservative | Alan Graves | 1,908 | 4.1 | 4th | 41.1 |
| Derby South | Derbyshire, East Midlands | 61.6 | Labour | Labour | Timothy Prosser | 2,480 | 5.8 | 4th | 45.3 |
| Dewsbury | West Yorkshire | 57.2 | Labour | Conservative | Philip James | 1,874 | 3.3 | 4th | 43.1 |
| Don Valley | South Yorkshire | 68.5 | Labour | Conservative | Paul Whitehurst | 6,247 | 13.7 | 3rd | 29.5 |
| Doncaster Central | South Yorkshire | 66.3 | Labour | Labour | Surjit Duhre | 6,842 | 16.5 | 3rd | 23.5 |
| Doncaster North | South Yorkshire | 70.0 | Labour | Labour | Andy Stewart | 8,294 | 20.4 | 3rd | 18.3 |
| Dulwich and West Norwood | London (South) | 22.0 | Labour | Conservative | Julia Stephenson | 571 | 1.0 | 4th | 64.5 |
| Dundee West | Angus, Scotland | 41.1 | Scottish National | Scottish National | Stuart Waiton | 1,271 | 3.1 | 5th | 50.7 |
| Dwyfor Meirionnydd | North Wales | 48.3 | Plaid Cymru | Plaid Cymru | Louise Hughes | 1,776 | 5.9 | 4th | 42.4 |
| Ealing Central and Acton | London (West) | 29.1 | Labour | Labour | Samir Alsoodani | 664 | 1.2 | 5th | 50.1 |
| Ealing Southall | London (West) | 41.8 | Labour | Labour | Rosamund Beattie | 867 | 2.1 | 5th | 58.7 |
| Easington | County Durham, North East | 66.5 | Labour | Labour | Julie Maughan | 6,744 | 19.5 | 3rd | 26.0 |
| East Ham | London (East) | 46.9 | Labour | Labour | Alka Sehgal Cuthbert | 1,107 | 3.0 | 4th | 74.3 |
| Eastbourne | East Sussex, South East England | 57.6 | Liberal Democrat | Conservative | Stephen Gander | 1,530 | 2.8 | 4th | 46.1 |
| Edinburgh North and Leith | Edinburgh, Lothian, Scotland | 21.8 | Scottish National | Scottish National | Robert Speirs | 558 | 0.9 | 6th | 42.8 |
| Edinburgh South West | Edinburgh, Lothian, Scotland | 27.9 | Scottish National | Scottish National | David Ballantine | 625 | 1.2 | 6th | 46.4 |
| Edmonton | London (North) | 45.5 | Labour | Labour | Sachin Sehgal | 840 | 2.1 | 5th | 62.9 |
| Ellesmere Port and Neston | Cheshire, North West | 57.7 | Labour | Labour | Christopher Stevens | 2,138 | 4.4 | 4th | 48.9 |
| Eltham | London (South) | 51.8 | Labour | Labour | Steve Kelleher | 1,523 | 3.5 | 4th | 43.5 |
| Enfield North | London (North) | 49.2 | Labour | Labour | Ike Ijeh | 797 | 1.8 | 5th | 50.0 |
| Enfield Southgate | London (North) | 37.9 | Labour | Labour | Parag Shah | 494 | 1.0 | 5th | 47.5 |
| Erith and Thamesmead | London (East) | 54.3 | Labour | Labour | Tom Bright | 2,246 | 5.4 | 3rd | 42.6 |
| Exeter | Devon, South West England | 44.7 | Labour | Labour | Leslie Willis | 1,428 | 2.5 | 4th | 50.7 |
| Feltham and Heston | London (West) | 55.9 | Labour | Labour | Martyn Nelson | 1,658 | 3.5 | 4th | 49.5 |
| Garston and Halewood | Merseyside, North West England | 47.8 | Labour | Labour | Jake Fraser | 2,943 | 5.5 | 4th | 66.8 |
| Gedling | Nottinghamshire, East Midlands | 56.1 | Labour | Conservative | Graham Hunt | 1,820 | 3.5 | 4th | 41.9 |
| Glasgow North | Greater Glasgow, Scotland | 21.6 | Scottish National | Scottish National | Dionne Cocozza | 320 | 0.9 | 6th | 46.0 |
| Glasgow South | Greater Glasgow, Scotland | 28.2 | Scottish National | Scottish National | Danyaal Raja | 516 | 1.1 | 6th | 47.0 |
| Glasgow South West | Greater Glasgow, Scotland | 40.9 | Scottish National | Scottish National | Peter Brown | 802 | 2.2 | 5th | 45.7 |
| Glenrothes | Fife, Scotland | 46.4 | Scottish National | Scottish National | Victor Farrell | 1,276 | 3.1 | 5th | 48.0 |
| Gower | South Wales | 50.1 | Labour | Labour | Rob Ross | 1,379 | 3.1 | 5th | 42.3 |
| Great Grimsby | Lincolnshire | 71.4 | Labour | Conservative | Christopher Barker | 2,378 | 7.2 | 3rd | 47.7 |
| Greenwich and Woolwich | London (East) | 35.7 | Labour | Labour | Kailash Trivedi | 1,228 | 2.3 | 5th | 54.5 |
| Hackney North and Stoke Newington | London (North) | 20.9 | Labour | Labour | Richard Ings | 609 | 1.1 | 5th | 69.2 |
| Hackney South and Shoreditch | London (North) | 22.1 | Labour | Labour | Robert Lloyd | 744 | 1.4 | 5th | 71.9 |
| Halifax | West Yorkshire | 58.8 | Labour | Labour | Sarah Wood | 2,813 | 6.1 | 3rd | 40.2 |
| Halton | Cheshire, North West | 57.8 | Labour | Labour | Janet Balfe | 3,730 | 8.1 | 3rd | 55.4 |
| Hammersmith | London (West) | 31.0 | Labour | Labour | James Keyse | 974 | 1.9 | 5th | 56.0 |
| Hampstead and Kilburn | London (North) | 23.4 | Labour | Labour | James Pointon | 684 | 1.2 | 5th | 47.7 |
| Harrow West | London (North) | 43.4 | Labour | Labour | Richard Jones | 931 | 1.9 | 5th | 50.5 |
| Hartlepool | County Durham, North East | 69.6 | Labour | Labour | Richard Tice | 10,603 | 25.8 | 3rd | 11.9 |
| Hayes and Harlington | London (West) | 59.4 | Labour | Labour | Harry Boparai | 1,292 | 2.9 | 4th | 52.9 |
| Hemsworth | West Yorkshire | 68.1 | Labour | Labour | Waj Ali | 5,930 | 13.5 | 3rd | 24.0 |
| Heywood and Middleton | Greater Manchester, North West | 45.3 | Labour | Conservative | Colin Lambert | 3,952 | 8.3 | 3rd | 34.8 |
| Holborn and St Pancras | London (North) | 26.7 | Labour | Labour | Hector Birchwood | 1,032 | 1.8 | 5th | 62.7 |
| Hornsey and Wood Green | London (North) | 25.0 | Labour | Labour | Daniel Corrigan | 763 | 1.2 | 5th | 56.3 |
| Houghton and Sunderland South | Tyne and Wear, North East | 62.6 | Labour | Labour | Kevin Yuill | 6,165 | 15.5 | 3rd | 25.2 |
| Hove | East Sussex, South East England | 33.9 | Labour | Labour | Angela Hancock | 1,111 | 2.0 | 5th | 56.3 |
| Huddersfield | West Yorkshire | 51.0 | Labour | Labour | Stuart Hale | 1,666 | 4.0 | 5th | 45.0 |
| Hyndburn | Lancashire, North West | 65.7 | Labour | Conservative | Gregory Butt | 2,156 | 5.1 | 3rd | 43.4 |
| Ilford North | London (East) | 52.5 | Labour | Labour | Neil Anderson | 960 | 1.9 | 4th | 48.6 |
| Ilford South | London (East) | 43.8 | Labour | Labour | Munish Sharma | 1,008 | 1.9 | 5th | 63.7 |
| Inverness, Nairn, Badenoch and Strathspey | Highlands, Scotland | 36.2 | Scottish National | Scottish National | Les Durance | 1,078 | 2.0 | 6th | 35.9 |
| Ipswich | Suffolk, East of England | 56.5 | Labour | Conservative | Nicola Thomas | 1,432 | 2.9 | 4th | 47.4 |
| Islington North | London (North) | 21.6 | Labour | Labour | Yosef David | 742 | 1.4 | 5th | 62.9 |
| Islington South and Finsbury | London (North) | 28.3 | Labour | Labour | Paddy Hannam | 1,136 | 2.4 | 5th | 53.9 |
| Islwyn | South Wales | 58.8 | Labour | Labour | James Wells | 4,834 | 14.1 | 3rd | 30.6 |
| Jarrow | County Durham, North East | 61.6 | Labour | Labour | Richard Monaghan | 4,122 | 10.1 | 3rd | 35.1 |
| Keighley | West Yorkshire | 53.3 | Labour | Conservative | Waqas Khan | 850 | 1.6 | 4th | 46.5 |
| Kensington | London (West) | 31.3 | Labour | Conservative | Jay Aston | 384 | 0.9 | 5th | 37.4 |
| Kingston and Surbiton | London (West) | 41.5 | Liberal Democrat | Liberal Democrat | Scott Holman | 788 | 1.3 | 5th | 49.8 |
| Kingston upon Hull East | East Riding of Yorkshire | 72.6 | Labour | Labour | Marten Hall | 5,764 | 17.8 | 3rd | 21.4 |
| Kingston upon Hull North | East Riding of Yorkshire | 59.9 | Labour | Labour | Derek Abram | 4,771 | 13.9 | 3rd | 35.9 |
| Kingston upon Hull West and Hessle | East Riding of Yorkshire | 67.8 | Labour | Labour | Michelle Dewberry | 5,638 | 18.0 | 3rd | 24.7 |
| Kirkcaldy and Cowdenbeath | Fife, Scotland | 41.6 | Labour | Scottish National | Mitch William | 1,132 | 2.4 | 6th | 32.8 |
| Knowsley | Merseyside, North West England | 52.4 | Labour | Labour | Tim McCullough | 3,348 | 6.1 | 3rd | 74.7 |
| Lancaster and Fleetwood | Lancashire, North West | 50.9 | Labour | Labour | Leanne Murray | 1,817 | 4.0 | 4th | 42.8 |
| Leeds Central | Leeds, West Yorkshire | 47.4 | Labour | Labour | Paul Thomas | 2,999 | 6.1 | 3rd | 55.6 |
| Leeds East | Leeds, West Yorkshire | 60.9 | Labour | Labour | Sarah Wass | 2,981 | 7.6 | 3rd | 42.2 |
| Leeds North East | Leeds, West Yorkshire | 37.3 | Labour | Labour | Inaya Folarin Iman | 1,769 | 3.5 | 5th | 54.0 |
| Leeds North West | Leeds, West Yorkshire | 35.3 | Labour | Labour | Graeme Webber | 1,304 | 2.7 | 5th | 45.9 |
| Leeds West | Leeds, West Yorkshire | 54.9 | Labour | Labour | Philip Mars | 2,685 | 6.7 | 3rd | 48.4 |
| Leicester East | Leicestershire, East Midlands | 53.1 | Labour | Labour | Tara Baldwin | 1,243 | 2.5 | 4th | 48.3 |
| Leicester South | Leicestershire, East Midlands | 42.5 | Labour | Labour | James Potter | 1,187 | 2.4 | 5th | 64.6 |
| Leicester West | Leicestershire, East Midlands | 51.6 | Labour | Labour | Jack Collier | 1,620 | 4.7 | 4th | 45.0 |
| Leigh | Greater Manchester, North West | 63.4 | Labour | Conservative | James Melly | 3,161 | 6.7 | 3rd | 38.6 |
| Lewisham Deptford | London (East) | 24.6 | Labour | Labour | Moses Etienne | 789 | 1.4 | 5th | 69.4 |
| Lewisham East | London (East) | 35.4 | Labour | Labour | Wesley Pollard | 1,234 | 2.8 | 5th | 56.7 |
| Lewisham West and Penge | London (East) | 34.4 | Labour | Labour | Teixeira Hambro | 1,060 | 2.0 | 5th | 59.2 |
| Leyton and Wanstead | London (East) | 37.1 | Labour | Labour | Zulf Jannaty | 785 | 1.8 | 5th | 62.9 |
| Lincoln | Lincolnshire, East Midlands | 57.3 | Labour | Conservative | Reece Wilkes | 1,079 | 2.1 | 5th | 45.8 |
| Linlithgow and East Falkirk | Falkirk, Scotland | 41.6 | Labour | Scottish National | Marc Bozza | 1,257 | 2.2 | 5th | 42.0 |
| Liverpool Riverside | Merseyside, North West England | 26.8 | Labour | Labour | David Leach | 1,779 | 3.4 | 5th | 74.6 |
| Liverpool Wavertree | Merseyside, North West England | 35.8 | Labour | Labour | Adam Heatherington | 1,921 | 4.4 | 4th | 67.8 |
| Liverpool West Derby | Merseyside, North West England | 50.2 | Labour | Labour | Ray Pearson | 2,012 | 4.6 | 3rd | 73.0 |
| Llanelli | South Wales | 55.4 | Labour | Labour | Susan Boucher | 3,605 | 9.4 | 4th | 32.8 |
| Luton North | Bedfordshire, East of England | 58.2 | Labour | Labour | Sudhir Sharma | 1,215 | 2.9 | 4th | 52.3 |
| Luton South | Bedfordshire, East of England | 55.4 | Labour | Labour | Garry Warren | 1,601 | 3.8 | 4th | 48.0 |
| Makerfield | Greater Manchester, North West | 65.0 | Labour | Labour | Ross Wright | 5,817 | 13.1 | 3rd | 32.0 |
| Manchester Central | Greater Manchester, North West | 36.6 | Labour | Labour | Sarah Chadwick | 2,335 | 4.5 | 4th | 65.9 |
| Manchester Gorton | Greater Manchester, North West | 37.9 | Labour | Labour | Lesley Kaya | 1,573 | 3.5 | 5th | 74.1 |
| Manchester Withington | Greater Manchester, North West | 26.3 | Labour | Labour | Stephen Ward | 1,308 | 2.5 | 5th | 65.3 |
| Merthyr Tydfil and Rhymney | South Wales | 58.4 | Labour | Labour | David Jones | 3,604 | 11.2 | 3rd | 41.2 |
| Middlesbrough | North Yorkshire | 66.0 | Labour | Labour | Faye Clements | 2,168 | 6.4 | 4th | 44.1 |
| Mitcham and Morden | London (South) | 44.7 | Labour | Labour | Jeremy Maddocks | 1,202 | 2.6 | 4th | 58.5 |
| Neath | South Wales | 54.2 | Labour | Labour | Simon Briscoe | 3,184 | 8.7 | 4th | 34.6 |
| Newcastle upon Tyne Central | Tyne and Wear, North East England | 48.3 | Labour | Labour | Mark Frederick Griffin | 2,542 | 6.8 | 4th | 50.8 |
| Newcastle upon Tyne North | Tyne and Wear, North East England | 57.1 | Labour | Labour | Richard Ogden | 4,331 | 9.2 | 4th | 36.2 |
| Newcastle-under-Lyme | Staffordshire, West Midlands | 61.6 | Labour | Conservative | Jason Cooper | 1,921 | 4.3 | 4th | 48.2 |
| Newport East | South Wales | 60.2 | Labour | Labour | Julie Price | 2,454 | 6.8 | 3rd | 37.6 |
| Newport West | South Wales | 53.0 | Labour | Labour | Cameron Edwards | 1,727 | 4.0 | 4th | 39.7 |
| Normanton, Pontefract and Castleford | West Yorkshire | 69.3 | Labour | Labour | Deneice Florence-Jukes | 8,032 | 16.6 | 3rd | 21.3 |
| North Durham | County Durham, North East | 60.1 | Labour | Labour | Peter Telford | 4,693 | 11.1 | 3rd | 33.1 |
| North Norfolk | Norfolk, East Anglia | 58.2 | Liberal Democrat | Conservative | Harry Gywnne | 1,739 | 3.4 | 4th | 55.2 |
| North Tyneside | Tyne and Wear, North East England | 59.3 | Labour | Labour | Andrew Husband | 5,254 | 10.4 | 3rd | 39.2 |
| North West Durham | County Durham, North East | 54.9 | Labour | Conservative | John Wolstenholme | 3,193 | 6.7 | 3rd | 35.2 |
| Norwich South | Norfolk, East Anglia | 40.2 | Labour | Labour | Sandy Gilchrist | 1,656 | 3.2 | 5th | 50.5 |
| Nottingham East | Nottinghamshire, East Midlands | 42.9 | Labour | Labour | Damian Smith | 1,343 | 3.4 | 5th | 60.9 |
| Nottingham North | Nottinghamshire, East Midlands | 63.8 | Labour | Labour | Julian Carter | 2,686 | 7.6 | 3rd | 41.5 |
| Nottingham South | Nottinghamshire, East Midlands | 46.5 | Labour | Labour | John Lawson | 2,012 | 4.2 | 4th | 51.0 |
| Ogmore | South Wales | 59.7 | Labour | Labour | Christine Roach | 2,991 | 8.5 | 3rd | 41.2 |
| Oldham East and Saddleworth | Greater Manchester, North West | 59.9 | Labour | Labour | Paul Brierley | 2,980 | 6.5 | 3rd | 37.0 |
| Oldham West and Royton | Greater Manchester, North West | 62.1 | Labour | Labour | Helen Formby | 3,316 | 7.5 | 3rd | 47.8 |
| Orkney and Shetland | Northern Isles, Scotland | 40.3 | Liberal Democrat | Liberal Democrat | Robert Smith | 900 | 3.9 | 5th | 40.9 |
| Oxford East | Oxfordshire, South East England | 32.3 | Labour | Labour | Roger Carter | 1,146 | 2.3 | 5th | 54.8 |
| Oxford West and Abingdon | Oxfordshire, South East England | 38.1 | Liberal Democrat | Liberal Democrat | Allison Wild | 829 | 1.4 | 4th | 51.9 |
| Penistone and Stocksbridge | South Yorkshire | 61.3 | Labour | Conservative | John Booker | 4,300 | 8.7 | 4th | 39.1 |
| Perth and North Perthshire | Perthshire, Scotland | 40.1 | Scottish National | Scottish National | Stuart Powell | 651 | 1.2 | 5th | 49.4 |
| Peterborough | Cambridgeshire, East of England | 62.1 | Labour | Conservative | Mike Greene | 2,127 | 4.4 | 4th | 42.3 |
| Plymouth Sutton and Devonport | Devon, South West England | 54.4 | Labour | Labour | Ann Widdecombe | 2,909 | 5.5 | 3rd | 42.4 |
| Pontypridd | South Wales | 45.8 | Labour | Labour | Steve Bayliss | 2,917 | 7.5 | 4th | 37.0 |
| Poplar and Limehouse | London (East) | 34.1 | Labour | Labour | Catherine Cui | 1,493 | 2.4 | 5th | 60.7 |
| Portsmouth South | Hampshire, South East England | 51.8 | Labour | Labour | John Kennedy | 994 | 2.1 | 4th | 46.5 |
| Preston | Lancashire, North West | 56.8 | Labour | Labour | Rob Sherratt | 1,799 | 5.3 | 3rd | 56.5 |
| Reading East | Berkshire, South East England | 38.2 | Labour | Labour | Mitchell Feierstein | 852 | 1.5 | 5th | 47.0 |
| Redcar | North Yorkshire | 67.5 | Labour | Conservative | Jacqui Cummins | 2,915 | 7.1 | 3rd | 39.0 |
| Rhondda | South Wales | 61.2 | Labour | Labour | John Watkins | 3,733 | 12.6 | 4th | 41.8 |
| Rochdale | Greater Manchester, North West | 57.5 | Labour | Labour | Chris Green | 3,867 | 8.2 | 3rd | 43.4 |
| Ross, Skye and Lochaber | Highlands, Scotland | 43.3 | Scottish National | Scottish National | Kate Brownlie | 710 | 1.8 | 5th | 46.5 |
| Rother Valley | South Yorkshire | 66.7 | Labour | Conservative | Allen Cowles | 6,264 | 12.9 | 3rd | 32.2 |
| Rotherham | South Yorkshire | 68.3 | Labour | Labour | Paul Hague | 6,125 | 17.2 | 3rd | 24.1 |
| Salford and Eccles | Greater Manchester, North West | 53.6 | Labour | Labour | Matt Mickler | 4,290 | 8.5 | 3rd | 48.3 |
| Scunthorpe | Lincolnshire | 69.0 | Labour | Conservative | Jerry Gorman | 2,044 | 5.4 | 3rd | 48.4 |
| Sedgefield | County Durham, North East | 58.9 | Labour | Conservative | David Bull | 3,518 | 8.5 | 3rd | 38.7 |
| Sefton Central | Merseyside, North West England | 45.1 | Labour | Labour | Paul Lomas | 2,425 | 4.8 | 4th | 52.7 |
| Sevenoaks | Kent, South East England | 53.8 | Conservative | Conservative | Paulette Furse* | 695 | 1.4 | 5th | 60.1 |
| Sheffield Brightside and Hillsborough | South Yorkshire | 61.4 | Labour | Labour | Johnny Johnson | 3,855 | 9.7 | 3rd | 46.8 |
| Sheffield Central | South Yorkshire | 30.4 | Labour | Labour | Paul Ward | 1,969 | 3.9 | 5th | 62.8 |
| Sheffield Hallam | South Yorkshire | 35.9 | Labour | Labour | Terence McHale | 1,562 | 2.7 | 5th | 31.9 |
| Sheffield Heeley | South Yorkshire | 57.6 | Labour | Labour | Tracy Knowles | 3,538 | 8.3 | 3rd | 42.0 |
| Sheffield South East | South Yorkshire | 66.4 | Labour | Labour | Kirk Kus | 4,478 | 10.7 | 3rd | 35.4 |
| Slough | Berkshire, South East England | 53.9 | Labour | Labour | Delphine Grey-Fisk | 1,432 | 2.8 | 4th | 54.8 |
| South Shields | Tyne and Wear, North East England | 62.1 | Labour | Labour | Glenn Thompson | 6,446 | 17.0 | 3rd | 28.6 |
| Southampton Test | Hampshire, South East England | 50.6 | Labour | Labour | Philip Crook | 1,591 | 3.5 | 4th | 46.3 |
| St Helens North | Merseyside, North West England | 58.2 | Labour | Labour | Malcolm Webster | 5,396 | 11.0 | 3rd | 41.3 |
| St Helens South and Whiston | Merseyside, North West England | 56.1 | Labour | Labour | Daniel Oxley | 5,353 | 10.6 | 3rd | 47.9 |
| Stalybridge and Hyde | Greater Manchester, North West | 59.3 | Labour | Labour | Julian Newton | 3,591 | 8.4 | 3rd | 36.3 |
| Stockport | Greater Manchester, North West | 46.8 | Labour | Labour | Lee Montague-Trenchard | 1,918 | 4.6 | 4th | 47.4 |
| Stockton North | County Durham, North East | 66.5 | Labour | Labour | Martin Walker | 3,907 | 9.5 | 3rd | 33.6 |
| Stockton South | County Durham, North East | 57.8 | Labour | Conservative | John Prescott | 2,196 | 4.0 | 4th | 46.7 |
| Stoke-on-Trent Central | Staffordshire, West Midlands | 65.0 | Labour | Conservative | Tariq Mahmood | 1,691 | 5.3 | 3rd | 40.1 |
| Stoke-on-Trent North | Staffordshire, West Midlands | 72.1 | Labour | Conservative | Richard Watkin | 2,374 | 5.9 | 3rd | 46.4 |
| Streatham | London (South) | 20.5 | Labour | Labour | Penelope Becker | 624 | 1.1 | 5th | 53.7 |
| Stretford and Urmston | Greater Manchester, North West | 48.4 | Labour | Labour | Gary Powell | 1,768 | 3.5 | 4th | 56.8 |
| Stroud | Gloucestershire, South West | 45.9 | Labour | Conservative | Desi Latimer | 1,085 | 1.6 | 4th | 46.3 |
| Sunderland Central | Tyne and Wear, North East | 60.0 | Labour | Labour | Viral Parikh | 5,047 | 11.6 | 3rd | 30.6 |
| Swansea East | South Wales | 62.0 | Labour | Labour | Tony Willicombe | 2,842 | 8.5 | 3rd | 43.3 |
| Swansea West | South Wales | 42.6 | Labour | Labour | Peter Hopkins | 1,983 | 5.5 | 5th | 46.1 |
| Tooting | London (South) | 25.3 | Labour | Labour | Adam Shakir | 462 | 0.8 | 5th | 52.6 |
| Torfaen | South Wales | 60.8 | Labour | Labour | David Thomas | 5,742 | 15.4 | 3rd | 26.4 |
| Tottenham | London (North) | 23.8 | Labour | Labour | Abdul Turay | 527 | 1.1 | 5th | 74.9 |
| Twickenham | London (West) | 33.6 | Liberal Democrat | Liberal Democrat | Stuart Wells | 816 | 1.3 | 4th | 54.8 |
| Tynemouth | Tyne and Wear, North East England | 47.8 | Labour | Labour | Ed Punchard | 1,963 | 3.5 | 4th | 44.6 |
| Vale of Clwyd | North Wales | 55.9 | Labour | Labour | Peter Dain | 1,477 | 4.0 | 4th | 42.4 |
| Vauxhall | London (South) | 22.4 | Labour | Labour | Andrew McGuinness | 641 | 1.1 | 5th | 55.0 |
| Wakefield | West Yorkshire | 62.6 | Labour | Conservative | Peter Wiltshire | 2,725 | 6.1 | 3rd | 41.2 |
| Wallasey | Merseyside, North West England | 49.9 | Labour | Labour | Martin York | 2,037 | 4.4 | 3rd | 59.9 |
| Walsall South | Staffordshire, West Midlands | 61.6 | Labour | Labour | Gary Hughes | 1,660 | 3.9 | 3rd | 45.2 |
| Walthamstow | London (East) | 33.5 | Labour | Labour | Paul Campbell | 768 | 1.6 | 5th | 74.5 |
| Wansbeck | Northumberland, North East | 56.1 | Labour | Labour | Eden Webley | 3,141 | 7.8 | 3rd | 34.5 |
| Warley | West Midlands conurbation | 61.8 | Labour | Labour | Michael Cooper | 2,469 | 6.6 | 3rd | 52.2 |
| Warrington North | Cheshire, North West | 58.6 | Labour | Labour | Elizabeth Babade | 2,626 | 5.6 | 4th | 38.6 |
| Warrington South | Cheshire, North West | 50.6 | Labour | Conservative | Clare Aspinall | 1,635 | 2.6 | 4th | 42.9 |
| Warwick and Leamington | Warwickshire, West Midlands | 41.1 | Labour | Labour | Tim Griffiths | 807 | 1.5 | 5th | 42.3 |
| Washington and Sunderland West | Tyne and Wear, North East | 61.9 | Labour | Labour | Howard Brown | 5,439 | 14.5 | 3rd | 28.0 |
| Weaver Vale | Cheshire, North West | 50.1 | Labour | Labour | Nicholas Goulding | 1,380 | 2.7 | 4th | 42.2 |
| West Bromwich East | West Midlands conurbation | 67.5 | Labour | Conservative | Christian Lucas | 1,475 | 4.1 | 3rd | 42.6 |
| West Bromwich West | West Midlands conurbation | 69.1 | Labour | Conservative | Franco D'Aulerio | 1,841 | 5.3 | 3rd | 45.2 |
| West Ham | London (East) | 47.3 | Labour | Labour | Emma Stockdale | 1,679 | 2.8 | 5th | 67.3 |
| West Lancashire | Lancashire, North West | 54.9 | Labour | Labour | Marc Stanton | 2,275 | 4.3 | 4th | 47.8 |
| Westminster North | London (North) | 32.9 | Labour | Labour | Cyrus Parvin | 418 | 1.0 | 5th | 53.2 |
| Westmorland and Lonsdale | Cumbria, North West | 47.4 | Liberal Democrat | Liberal Democrat | Steven Bolton | 763 | 1.5 | 4th | 47.4 |
| Wigan | Greater Manchester, North West | 62.7 | Labour | Labour | William Molloy | 5,959 | 13.2 | 3rd | 33.5 |
| Wirral South | Merseyside, North West England | 46.6 | Labour | Labour | Martin Waring | 1,219 | 2.8 | 4th | 48.4 |
| Wirral West | Merseyside, North West England | 44.7 | Labour | Labour | John Kelly | 860 | 2.0 | 5th | 46.2 |
| Wolverhampton North East | West Midlands conurbation | 67.7 | Labour | Conservative | Vishal Khatri | 1,354 | 3.9 | 3rd | 47.8 |
| Wolverhampton South East | West Midlands conurbation | 68.2 | Labour | Labour | Raj Chaggar | 2,094 | 6.3 | 3rd | 40.1 |
| Wolverhampton South West | West Midlands conurbation | 54.6 | Labour | Conservative | Leo Grandison | 1,028 | 2.5 | 4th | 45.8 |
| Workington | Cumbria, North West | 60.3 | Labour | Conservative | David Walker | 1,749 | 4.2 | 3rd | 45.1 |
| Worsley and Eccles South | Greater Manchester, North West | 59.8 | Labour | Labour | Seamus Martin | 3,224 | 7.2 | 3rd | 38.5 |
| Wrexham | North Wales | 57.3 | Labour | Conservative | Ian Berkeley-Hurst | 1,222 | 3.6 | 5th | 41.7 |
| Wythenshawe and Sale East | Greater Manchester, North West | 49.8 | Labour | Labour | Julie Fousert | 2,717 | 6.1 | 4th | 47.2 |
| Ynys Môn (Anglesey) | North Wales | 50.9 | Labour | Conservative | Helen Jenner | 2,184 | 6.0 | 4th | 29.5 |
| York Central | North Yorkshire | 38.5 | Labour | Labour | Nicholas Szkiler | 1,479 | 3.0 | 5th | 52.2 |
