= Matthew Patten =

Matthew Patten may refer to:

- Matthew Patten (judge), American judge and diarist
- Matthew Patten (politician), British politician
- Matt Patten, American politician in Ohio
