= Margot Parker =

British politician (born 1943)

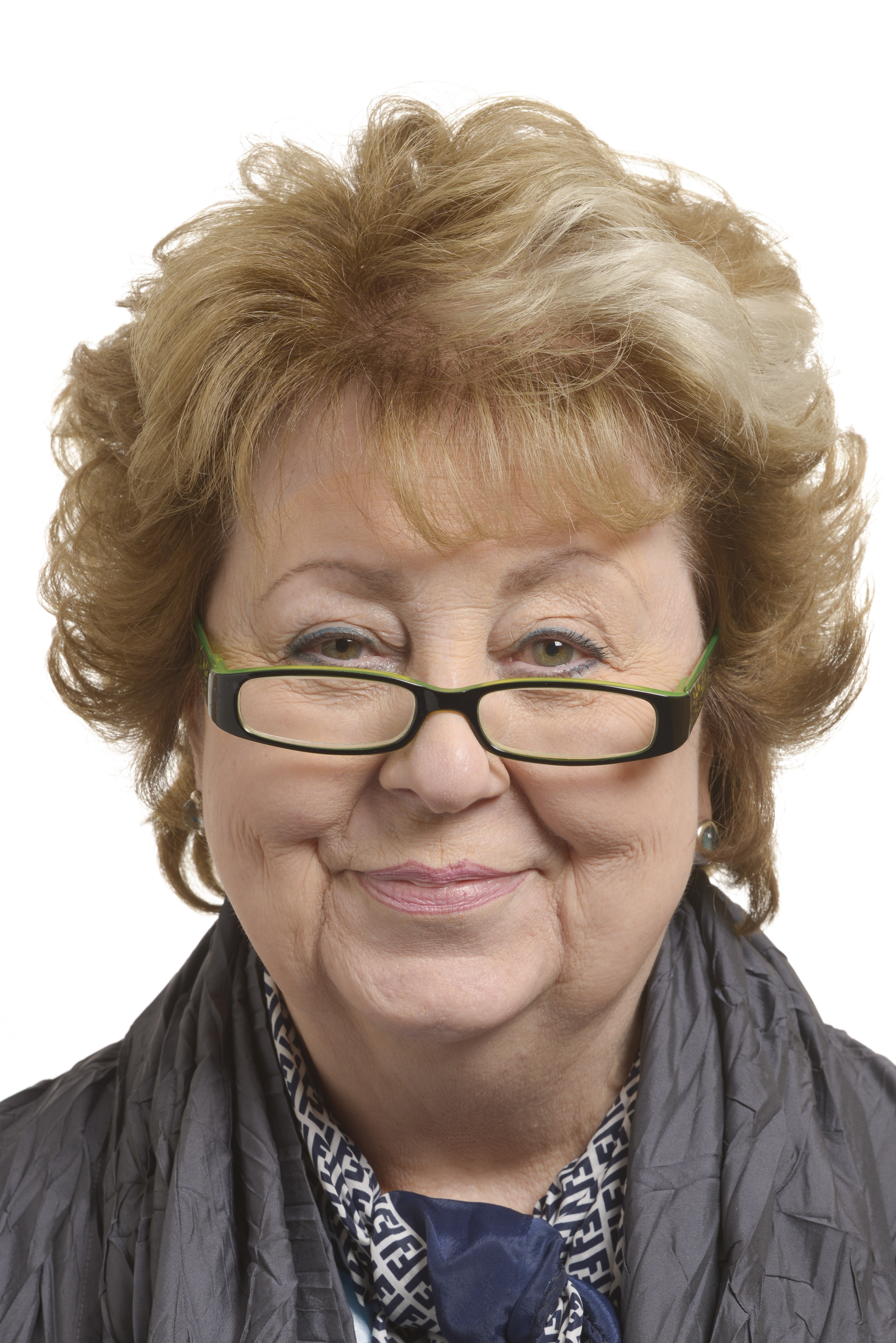

Deputy Chair of the UK Independence Party & Spokesperson for Home Affairs
- In office 27 February 2018 – 15 April 2019
- Leader: Gerard Batten
- Preceded by: The Earl of Dartmouth (Deputy Chair); Richard Bingley (Home Affairs)
- Succeeded by: Vacant

Deputy Leader of the UK Independence Party
- In office 18 October 2017 – 22 January 2018
- Leader: Henry Bolton
- Preceded by: Peter Whittle
- Succeeded by: Mike Hookem

UKIP Spokesperson for Women and Equalities
- In office 2 December 2016 – 18 October 2017
- Leader: Paul Nuttall
- Preceded by: Office established
- Succeeded by: Star Anderton

UKIP Spokesperson for Small Business
- In office 24 July 2014 – 1 December 2016
- Leader: Nigel Farage
- Preceded by: Office established
- Succeeded by: Ernie Warrender

Member of the European Parliament for East Midlands
- In office 1 July 2014 – 1 July 2019
- Preceded by: Derek Clark
- Succeeded by: Annunziata Rees-Mogg

Personal details
- Born: 24 July 1943 (age 83) Grantham, Lincolnshire, England
- Other political affiliations: Brexit Party (April 2019–May 2019); UK Independence Party (2010–2019); Libertas (2009)
- Education: De Montfort University

Margaret Lucille Jeanne "Margot" Parker (born 24 July 1943) is a British politician who served as a Member of the European Parliament (MEP) for the East Midlands region between 2014 and 2019.

== Early life ==
Margaret Lucille Jeanne Parker was born in Grantham. She was educated at Kesteven and Grantham Girls' School and De Montfort University, where she read Law.

== Career ==
Parker stood as a candidate for Libertas in the 2009 European election in the East Midlands. She was second on the party list; the party won 0.6% of the vote and no seats.

By the following year she had defected to the UK Independence Party (UKIP). She stood in Sherwood in the 2010 general election, finishing 5th (1,490 votes, 3%). In 2012, she stood in the Corby by-election, finishing third with 5,108 votes (14.3%).

In 2014, Parker was nominated as the second candidate on the East Midlands list for UKIP in preparation for the 2014 European Parliament election. She was subsequently elected alongside Roger Helmer as a UKIP MEP for the East Midlands constituency.

Following the election of Henry Bolton as leader of UKIP in 2017, Parker was appointed deputy leader. After Bolton refused to stand down following a vote of no confidence by UKIP's National Executive Committee, Parker resigned as deputy leader.

During the leadership of Gerard Batten, Parker served as Home Affairs spokeswoman and Deputy Chair of the UK Independence Party, but resigned her post and membership of the party in April 2019, defecting to the Brexit Party, alongside Jane Collins & Jill Seymour, citing Batten's defence of Carl Benjamin's 2016 tweet saying he "wouldn't even rape" Labour MP Jess Phillips.

Despite her defection, Parker was not selected as a Brexit Party candidate for the 2019 European Parliament elections, and ceased to be a Member of the European Parliament on 26 May 2019.
