= Derek Clark =

British politician (1933–2023)

Derek Roland Clark
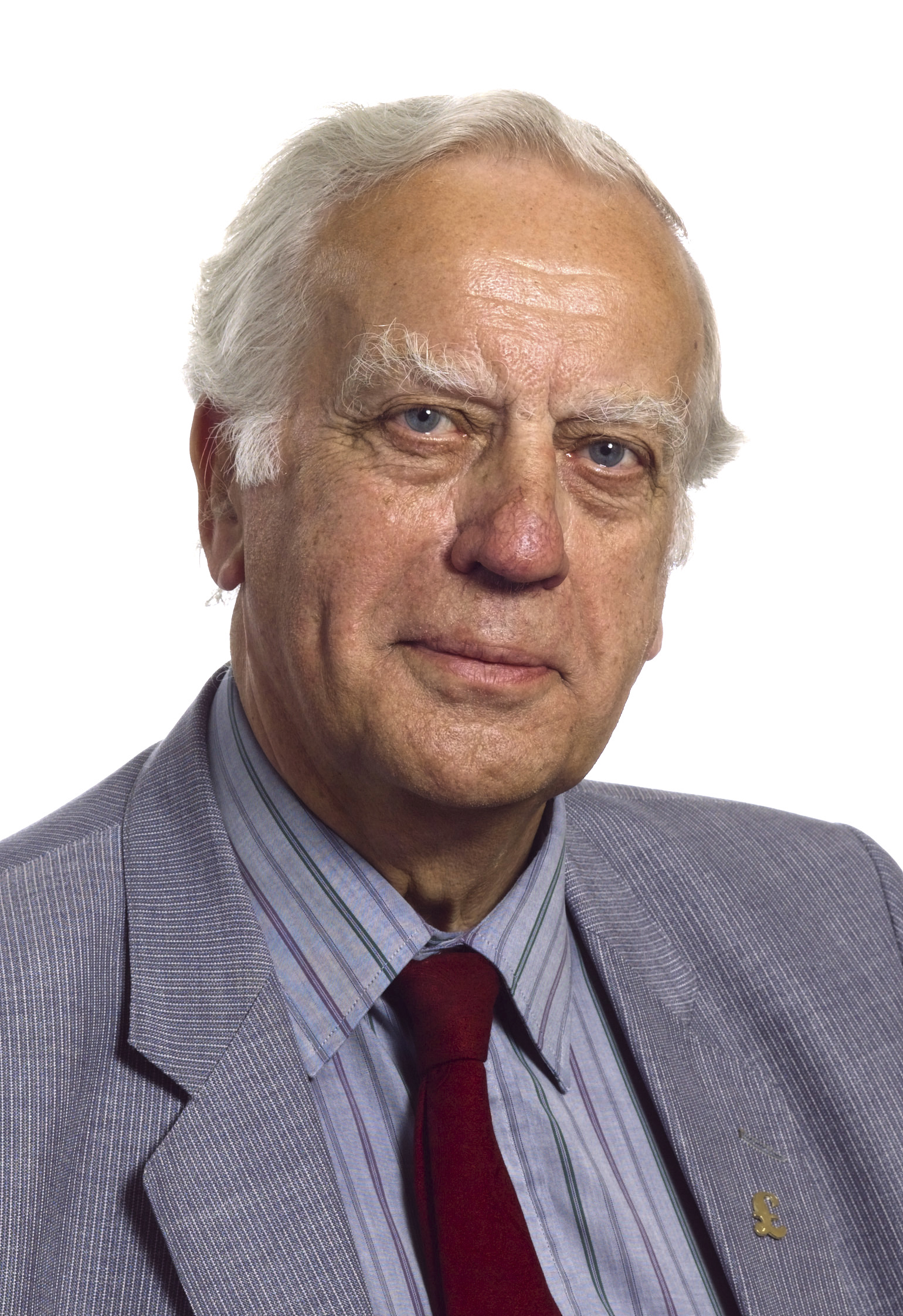

Member of the European Parliament for East Midlands
- In office 10 June 2004 – 2 July 2014
- Preceded by: Mel Read
- Succeeded by: Margot Parker

Personal details
- Born: 10 October 1933 Bristol, England
- Died: 1 January 2023 (aged 89)
- Party: UK Independence Party
- Education: University of Bristol; University of Exeter
- Profession: Science teacher (retired)
- Website: www.derekclarkmep.org.uk

Derek Roland Clark (10 October 1933 – 1 January 2023) was a UK Independence Party politician. He was a Member of the European Parliament (MEP) for the East Midlands from 2004 to 2014.

He stood as a UKIP candidate in the 2010 general election for Northampton South, receiving 1,897 votes (4.9%), which was 50 votes short of retaining his deposit.

He was educated at the University of Bristol (Teaching Certificate) and the University of Exeter. He was a retired science teacher.

In 2011, he was investigated by OLAF, the EU anti-fraud office, and was made to repay £31,800 for wages paid to employees who were working for UKIP and not for his EU Parliament work.

Clark was a climate change denier and pledged to ban the teaching of anthropogenic global warming in schools.

Clark died on 1 January 2023, at the age of 89.
