= Staffordshire East and Derby (European Parliament constituency) =

Former European Parliament constituency

- European Parliament constituency
- Boundary within the West Midlands (1994-1999)
- Member state: United Kingdom
- Created: 1994
- Dissolved: 1999
- MEPs: 1

Prior to its uniform adoption of proportional representation in 1999, the United Kingdom used first-past-the-post for the European elections in England, Scotland and Wales. The European Parliament constituencies used under that system were smaller than the later regional constituencies and only had one Member of the European Parliament each.

The constituency of Staffordshire East and Derby was one of them.

It consisted of the Westminster Parliament constituencies (on their 1983 boundaries) of Burton, Cannock and Burntwood, Derby North, Derby South, Mid Staffordshire, South Derbyshire, and South East Staffordshire.

== MEPs ==
Election	Member	Party
Part of Staffordshire East and Derbyshire prior to 1994
1994	Phillip Whitehead	Labour
1999	Constituency abolished, part of East Midlands from 1999	

== Election results ==
European Parliament election, 1994: Staffordshire East and Derby
Party	Candidate	Votes	%	±%
Labour	Phillip Whitehead	102,393	55.6	
Conservative	Mrs. Jane C. Evans	50,197	27.3	
Liberal Democrats	Mrs. Diana J. Brass	17,469	9.5	
UKIP	Ian E. Crompton	6,993	3.8	
Green	Richard J. Clarke	4,272	2.3	
National Front	Robert P. Jones	2,098	1.1	
Natural Law	Mrs. Dinah Grice	793	0.4	
Majority		52,196	28.3	
Turnout		184,215	35.5	
Labour win (new seat)				
