= East Midlands (European Parliament constituency) =

Former European Parliament constituency

- European Parliament constituency
- Location among the 2014 constituencies

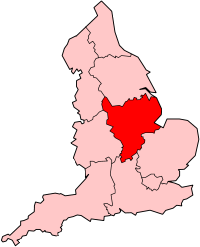
- Shown within England
- Member state: United Kingdom
- Created: 1999
- Dissolved: 31 January 2020
- MEPs: 6 (1999–2009); 5 (2009–2020)

East Midlands was a constituency of the European Parliament in the United Kingdom, established in 1999 with six members to replace single-member constituencies. Between 2009 and the United Kingdom's withdrawal from the EU on 31 January 2020 it returned five MEPs, elected using the D'Hondt method of party-list proportional representation.

== Boundaries ==
The constituency corresponded to the East Midlands region of England, comprising the counties of Derbyshire, Nottinghamshire, Leicestershire, Rutland, Northamptonshire and most of Lincolnshire.

== History ==
The constituency was organised as a result of the European Parliamentary Elections Act 1999, replacing a number of single-member constituencies. These were Leicester, Northamptonshire and Blaby, Nottingham and Leicestershire North West, Nottinghamshire North and Chesterfield, and parts of Lincolnshire and Humberside South, Peak District, and Staffordshire East and Derby.

MEPs for former East Midlands constituencies, 1979 – 1999
Election	1979 – 1984	1984 – 1989	1989 – 1994	1994 – 1999
Derbyshire (1979–1994)	Tom Spencer; Conservative	Geoff Hoon; Labour		Seat abolished
Leicester	Frederick Tuckman; Conservative		Mel Read; Labour	Susan Waddington; Labour
Lincolnshire (1979–1994); Lincolnshire and Humberside South (1994–1999)	Bill Newton Dunn; Conservative			Veronica Hardstaff; Labour
Northamptonshire (1979–1994); Northamptonshire and Blaby (1994–1999)	Anthony Simpson; Conservative			Angela Billingham; Labour
Nottingham (1979–1994); Nottingham and Leicestershire North West (1994–1999)	Michael Gallagher; Labour (1979–1984); SDP (1984)	Michael Kilby; Conservative	Ken Coates; Labour	Mel Read; Labour
Nottinghamshire North and Chesterfield (1994–1999)	Seat not established			Ken Coates; Labour
Peak District (1994–1999)	Seat not established			Arlene McCarthy; Labour
Staffordshire East and Derby (1994–1999)	Staffordshire East in West Midlands			Phillip Whitehead; Labour

== Returned members ==
MEPs for the East Midlands, 1999 onwards
Election	1999 (5th parliament)	2004 (6th parliament)	2009 (7th parliament)	2014 (8th parliament)	2017	2018	2019 (9th parliament)
MEP Party	Phillip Whitehead; Labour		Glenis Willmott; Labour		Rory Palmer; Labour		
MEP Party	Mel Read; Labour	Derek Clark; UKIP		Margot Parker; UKIP (2014–19); Brexit Party (2019)			Annunziata Rees-Mogg; Brexit Party (2019); Independent (2019–20); Conservative (2020–21)
MEP Party	Roger Helmer; Conservative (1999–2012); UKIP (2012–2017)					Jonathan Bullock; UKIP (2017–2018); Independent (2018); Brexit Party (2019–21)	
MEP Party	Chris Heaton-Harris; Conservative		Emma McClarkin; Conservative				Matthew Patten; Brexit Party
MEP Party	Bill Newton Dunn; Conservative (1999–2000); Liberal Democrat (2000–2014)			Andrew Lewer; Conservative	Rupert Matthews; Conservative		Bill Newton Dunn; Liberal Democrat
MEP Party	Nick Clegg; Liberal Democrat	Robert Kilroy-Silk; UKIP (2004); Veritas (2004–05); Independent (2005–09)	Seat abolished				

Notes:

- ^{1} Roger Helmer announced on 12 October 2011 his intention to stand down from the European Parliament. After uncertainty whether his place would be taken by the next person on the Conservative Party's list for the East Midlands region, he defected to UKIP and completed his term as MEP.

Key to political groups of the European Parliament (UK)
Party			Faction in European Parliament	
Brexit Party	29		Non-Inscrits	57
DUP	1		Non-Inscrits	57
Liberal Democrats	16	17	Renew Europe	108
Alliance	1	17	Renew Europe	108
Green	7	11	Greens–European Free Alliance	75
SNP	3	11	Greens–European Free Alliance	75
Plaid Cymru	1	11	Greens–European Free Alliance	75
Labour	10		Socialists and Democrats	154
Conservative	4		European Conservatives and Reformists Group	62
Sinn Féin	1		European United Left–Nordic Green Left	41
Total	73		Total	750

=== Complaint against Kilroy-Silk ===
In August 2005, four of the MEPs for the region (Clark, Heaton-Harris, Helmer and Whitehead) sent a joint letter to President of the European Parliament Josep Borrell to complain of Kilroy-Silk:

"He seems to have done little or no work as a constituency MEP for the East Midlands. This leaves five MEPs to do the work of six and the electorate have been short-changed". They complained that Kilroy-Silk was not "fulfilling the pledge he made on becoming an MEP, to serve the electorate of his region" and to call for him to "either do the job for which he is paid, or get out and leave it to those who can."

The parliament has no power to remove Mr Kilroy-Silk, who is understood to have attended the minimum number of plenary sessions required to be eligible for his parliamentary allowances. Such a complaint was unprecedented. Kilroy-Silk refused to comment on it. The European Parliament does not have any power to expel a member, and Borrell took no action.

== Election results ==
Elected candidates are shown in bold. Brackets indicate the number of votes per seat won and order MEPs were elected.

=== 2019 ===
2019 results

European Election 2019: East Midlands
List	Candidates	Votes	Of total (%)	± from prev.
Brexit Party	**Annunziata Rees-Mogg** (1) **Jonathan Bullock** (2) **Matthew Patten** (5) Tracy Knowles, Anna Bailey	452,321 (150,773.67)	38.23	+38.23
Liberal Democrats	**Bill Newton Dunn** (3) Michael Mullaney, Lucy Care, Suzanna Austin, Caroline Kenyon	203,989	17.24	+11.82
Labour	**Rory Palmer** (4) Leonie Mathers, Tony Tinley, Nicolle Ndiweni, Gary Godden	164,682	13.92	−11.01
Conservative	Emma McClarkin, Rupert Matthews, Tony Harper, Brendan Clarke-Smith, Thomas Randall	126,138	10.66	−15.33
Green	Kat Boettge, Gerhard Lohmann-Bond, Liam McClelland, Daniel Wimberley, Simon Tooke	124,630	10.53	+4.55
UKIP	Alan Graves, Marietta King, Anil Bhatti, Fran Loi, John Evans	58,198	4.92	−27.98
Change UK	Kate Godfrey, Joan Laplana, Narinder Sharma, Pankajkumar Gulab, Emma Manley	41,117	3.47	+3.47
Independent Network	Nick Byatt, Marianne Overton, Daniel Simpson, Pearl Clarke, Nikki Dillon	7,641	0.65	+0.65
Independent	Simon Rood	4,511	0.38	+0.38
Turnout		1,183,227	34.9	+1.7

=== 2014 ===
2014 results

European Election 2014: East Midlands
List	Candidates	Votes	Of total (%)	± from prev.
UKIP	**Roger Helmer** (1) **Margot Parker** (4) Jonathan Bullock, Nigel Wickens, Barry Mahoney	368,734 (184,367)	32.90	+16.45
Conservative	**Emma McClarkin** (2) **Andrew Lewer** (5) Rupert Matthews, Stephen Castens, Brendan Clarke-Smith	291,270 (145,635)	25.99	−4.16
Labour	**Glenis Willmott** (3) Rory Palmer, Linda Woodings, Khalid Hadadi, Nick Brooks	279,363	24.93	+8.08
Green	Katharina Boettge, Sue Mallender, Richard Mallender, Peter Allen, Simon Hales	67,066	5.98	−0.85
Liberal Democrats	Bill Newton Dunn, Issan Ghazni, Phil Knowles, George Smid, Deborah Newton-Cook	60,772	5.42	−6.91
An Independence from Europe	Chris Pain, Val Pain, Alan Jesson, John Beaver, Carl Mason	21,384	1.91	New
BNP	Catherine Duffy, Robert West, Bob Brindley, Geoffrey Dickens, Paul Hilliard	18,326	1.64	−7.02
English Democrat	Kevin Sills, David Wickham, John Dowie, Oliver Healey, Terry Spencer	11,612	1.04	−1.28
Harmony Party	Steve Ward	2,194	0.2	New
Turnout		1,120,722	33.2	−3.9

=== 2009 ===
2009 results

European Election 2009: East Midlands
List	Candidates	Votes	Of total (%)	± from prev.
Conservative	**Roger Helmer** (1) **Emma McClarkin** (4) Rupert Matthews, Fiona Bulmer, George Lee	370,275 (185,137.5)	30.2	+3.8
Labour	**Glenis Willmott** (2) Roy Kennedy, Kathryn Salt, J David Morgan, Cate Taylor	206,945	16.9	−4.1
UKIP	**Derek Clark** (3) Christopher Pain, Stephen Allison, Deva Kumarasiri, Irena Marriott	201,184	16.4	−9.7
Liberal Democrats	**Bill Newton Dunn** (5) Ed Maxfield, Veena Hudson, Denise Hawksworth, Deborah Newton-Cook	151,428	12.3	−0.6
BNP	Robert West, Cathy Duffy, Peter Jarvis, Lewis Alsebrook, Kevin Stafford	106,319	8.7	+2.2
Green	Sue Blount, Richard Mallender, Ashley Baxter, Matthew Follett, Barney Smith	83,939	6.8	+1.3
English Democrat	Derek Hilling, Tony Ellis, Diane Bilgrami, David Ball, Anthony Edwards	28,498	2.3	New
UK First	Ian Gillman, Christopher Elliot, Nadine Platt, David Noakes, Mariann Finch	20,561	1.7	New
Christian	Suzanne Nti, Thomas Rogers, Timothy Webb, Colin Bricher, Doreen Schrimshaw	17,907	1.5	New
Socialist Labour	David Roberts, Paul Liversuch, Shaun Kirkpatrick, Michael Clifford, Thea Roberts	13,590	1.1	New
NO2EU	John McEwan, Avtar Sadiq, Jean Thorpe, Shangara Singh Gahonia, Laurence Platt	11,375	0.9	New
Libertas	Richard Elvin, Margot Parker, Peter Chaplin	7,882	0.6	New
Jury Team	James Lowey, Simon Flude, James Parker, Henry Blanchard, Perry Wilsher	7,362	0.6	New
Turnout		1,228,065	37.1	−6.3

=== 2004 ===
2004 results

European Election 2004: East Midlands
List	Candidates	Votes	Of total (%)	± from prev.
Conservative	**Roger Helmer** (1) **Chris Heaton-Harris** (4) Pauline Latham, Sharon Buckle, Jonathan Bullock, Sarah Richardson	371,362 (185,681)	26.4	−13.1
UKIP	**Robert Kilroy-Silk** (2) **Derek Clark** (5) Ian Gillman, Peter Baker, John Browne, Barry Mahoney	366,498 (183,249)	26.1	+18.5
Labour	**Phillip Whitehead** (3) Glenis Willmott, Ross Willmott, Vandna Kalia, Alan Rhodes, Elizabeth Donnelly	294,918	21.0	−7.6
Liberal Democrats	**Bill Newton Dunn** (6) Nick Clegg, Alan Riley, Veena Hudson, Richard Church, Deborah Newton-Cook	181,964	12.9	+0.2
BNP	Peter Francis, Clive Potter, Patrick May, John Pennington, Wendy Russell, John Hall	91,860	6.5	+5.2
Green	Brian Fewster, Susan Blount, Robert Ball, Simon Anthony, Paul Bodenham, John Chadwick	76,633	5.5	+0.1
Respect	Mohammed Suleman, Sulma Mansuri, Pauline Robinson, Helen Merryman, Craig Plowman, Mary Littlefield	20,009	1.4	New
Independent	Russell Rogers	2,615	0.2	New
Independent	Shadmyraine Halliday	847	0.1	New
Turnout		1,406,706	43.4	+20.6

=== 1999 ===
1999 results

European Election 1999: East Midlands
List	Candidates	Votes	Of total (%)	± from prev.
Conservative	**Roger Helmer** (1) **Bill Newton Dunn** (3) **Chris Heaton-Harris** (5) Javed Arain, Sharon Buckle, Pauline Latham	285,662 (95,220.67)	39.5	
Labour	**Mel Read** (2) **Phillip Whitehead** (4) Angela Billingham, Sue Waddington, Valerie Vaz, Veronica Hardstaff, John Mann	206,756 (103,378)	28.6	
Liberal Democrats	**Nick Clegg** (6) Susan Barber, Ash Vadher, Lisa Gabriel, Brian Niblett, Lesley Dunbar	92,398	12.7	
UKIP	Hugh Meechan, Edward Spalton, Derek Clark, David Barraclough, Barry Mahoney, Dusan Torbica	54,800	7.6	
Green	Gaynor Backhouse, Geoffrey Forse, Brian Fewster, Sue Blount, Ashley Baxter, Jill Bullock	38,954	5.4	
Leeds Left Alliance	Ken Coates, Tony Simpson, Jill Dawn, Peter Jackson, Peter McGowan, Robert West	17,409	2.4	
Pro-Euro Conservative	Freddie de Lisle, John Szermerey, Julien Goodman, Katheryn Stokes, Greg Chadwick, Clive Stoddart	11,359	1.6	
BNP	Steven Belshaw, Adrian Belshaw, Barry Roberts, Neil Phillips, Edward Sheppard, Michael Coleman	9,342	1.3	
Socialist Labour	David Roberts, Paul Liversuch, Valerie Seabright, Thea Hutt, Stanley Taylor, Stephen Marvin	5,528	0.8	
Natural Law	Russell France, Susan Lincoln, Patricia Saunders, David Cooke, Andrew Doughty, Neil Allison	1,525	0.2	
Turnout		723,733	22.8	
