= British Beer & Pub Association =

Trade association in the United Kingdom

- British Beer and Pub Association Logo
- Abbreviation: BBPA
- Formation: 1904
- Legal status: Non-profit company
- Purpose: Brewing and pubs in the UK
- Location(s): 61 Queen Street, London, EC4
- Region served: United Kingdom
- Members: 50+ brewing and pub company organisations and various associate organisations
- Chairman: Nick MacKenzie
- Chief Executive: Emma McClarkin
- Main organ: BBPA Council and Board
- Website: www.beerandpub.com

The British Beer & Pub Association represents about 90% of UK brewing (by volume) and the ownership of around 20,000 of the nation's pubs.

== History ==
The Association was founded in 1904 as the Brewers' Society, was for a period in the 1990s known as the Brewers and Licensed Retailers Association before becoming the British Beer & Pub Association in 2000 to reflect its growing pub company membership.

== See also ==
- British Institute of Innkeeping Awarding Body
- Campaign for Real Ale
