= Phillip Whitehead =

British politician and television producer (1937–2005)

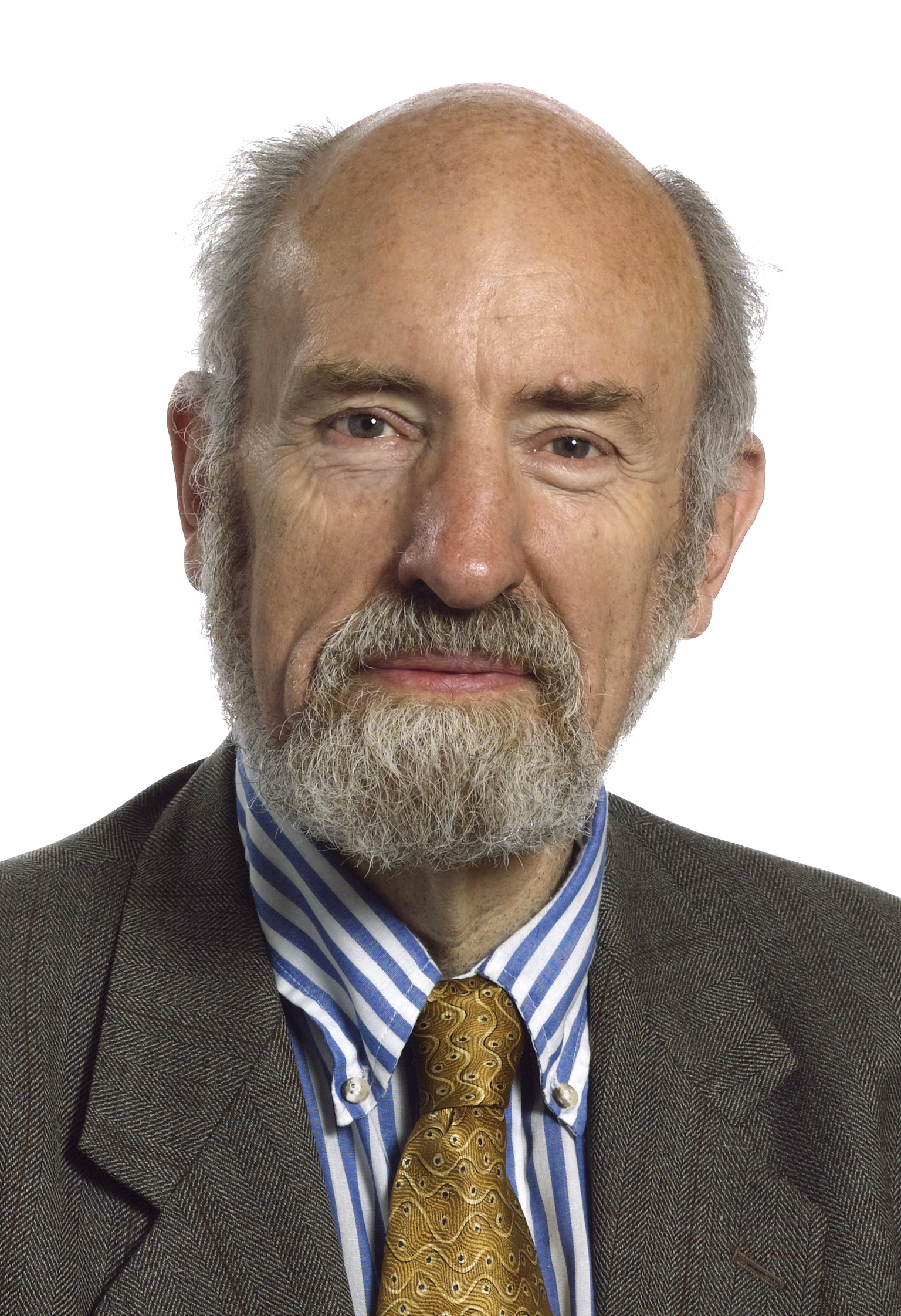
- Official portrait, 2004

Member of the European Parliament for East Midlands
- In office 9 June 1994 – 31 December 2005
- Preceded by: Position established
- Succeeded by: Glenis Willmott

Member of Parliament for Derby North
- In office 18 June 1970 – 13 May 1983
- Preceded by: Niall MacDermot
- Succeeded by: Greg Knight

Personal details
- Born: 30 May 1937 Matlock Bath, Derbyshire, England
- Died: 31 December 2005 (aged 68) Chesterfield, Derbyshire, England
- Party: Labour
- Education: Exeter College, Oxford
- Occupation: Politician; Writer
- Profession: Television producer

Phillip Whitehead (30 May 1937 – 31 December 2005) was a British Labour politician, television producer and writer.

== Early life ==
Born in Matlock Bath, Derbyshire, he was adopted by a local family in Rowsley, and attended Lady Manners School in Bakewell and Exeter College, Oxford, where he obtained his BA degree.

Whitehead went up to Oxford following in his adoptive parents' footsteps as a Conservative. He was President of the Oxford University Conservative Association and the Oxford Union in 1961.

== Career ==
Whitehead was an independent documentary producer in the early 1960s and later an editor with the BBC and ITV from 1967 to 1970. He was married to Christine Usborne, formerly his assistant, with whom he had two sons and a daughter.

=== House of Commons ===
After standing unsuccessfully at West Derbyshire in 1966, he represented Derby North as a Labour MP from 1970 to 1983, when he was defeated by the Conservative Greg Knight. He tried to win back the seat in 1987 but was beaten once again.

Whitehead was a member of several parliamentary committees:

- Member, Council of Europe/WEU
- Member, Annan Committee on the Future of Broadcasting
- Member, Commons Select Committee on Home Affairs, which abolished 'sus'
- Front Bench Spokesman on Higher Education and the Arts

=== Back to television ===
After his defeat at the 1983 general election, Whitehead returned to television as a producer and director. He was also author of several books derived, with the exception of his Fabian essays, from the television series he produced:

- The Writing On The Wall: Britain in the Seventies (London: Michael Joseph, 1985); ISBN 0718124715
- Dynasty: The Nehrus and the Gandhis (1997; with Jad Adams; ISBN 978-0788191237)
- contributor to Changing States, Fabian Essays, Ruling Dimension
- The Windsors—A Dynasty Revealed 1917–2000 (2000; with Piers Brendon: ISBN 0712667970; original 1994: ISBN 978-0340610138)
- Stalin, a Time for Judgement

In 1988 he was MacTaggart Memorial Lecturer at the Edinburgh TV Festival.

=== European Parliament ===
He was a Labour member of the European Parliament from 1994 to his death, first serving as MEP for Staffordshire East and Derby, and later as one of the members for the East Midlands.

On 23 July 2004 he was elected chair of the Parliamentary Committee on the Internal Market and Consumer Protection. He was also member of the European Parliament's African, Caribbean and Pacific Joint Parliamentary Assembly and chair of the European Parliamentary Labour Party.

A list of EP committees of which Whitehead was a member:

- Member, EP Committee for Environment, Public Health, Consumer Protection
- Substitute member, EP Committee for Culture, Youth, Education, Media
- Chair, European Parliament Consumer Intergroup
- Member, Vice-President, EP delegation for relations with Czech Republic
- Member, EP delegation to EU Bulgaria Joint Parliamentary Committee
- Member and co-ordinator, EP Committee of Enquiry into BSE
- Chair, European Parliamentary Labour Party
- Member, EP Committee for Environment, Public Health and Consumer Protection
- Substitute member, EP Committee for Culture, Youth, Media and Sport
- Member, EP Temporary Committee on Foot and Mouth Disease
- Member, EP delegation for relations with Czech Republic
- Member, Consumer Forum Intergroup
- Chair, Internal Market and Consumer Protection Committee
- Substitute Member, Environment, Public Health and Food Safety Committee
- Member, ACP-EU Joint Parliamentary Assembly
- Member, European Parliament delegation for relations with Romania

Other professional memberships held by Whitehead:

- Director, Brook Associates TV production company
- Chair of the Fabian Society
- Council member and Chair of the Consumers' Association
- Chairman of Statesman-Nation Publications

== Death ==
He retained a close association with Derbyshire, especially the Bakewell area, throughout his life. Whitehead was taken ill on 31 December 2005 and died later that evening in a hospital in Chesterfield from a heart attack aged 68.

In recognition of his service to the city The Phillip Whitehead Memorial Library, a public library on Chaddesden Park in Derby, was opened in March 2013.

Parliament of the United Kingdom
Preceded by Niall MacDermot	Member of Parliament for Derby North; 1970–1983	Succeeded by Greg Knight
Party political offices
Preceded by Dick Leonard	Chairman of the Fabian Society; 1978–1979	Succeeded by Peter Archer
