= Peak District (European Parliament constituency) =

Former European Parliament constituency

- European Parliament constituency
- Boundary within the East Midlands (1994-1999)
- Member state: United Kingdom
- Created: 1994
- Dissolved: 1999
- MEPs: 1

Prior to its uniform adoption of proportional representation in 1999, the United Kingdom used first-past-the-post for the European elections in England, Scotland and Wales. The European Parliament constituencies used under that system were smaller than the later regional constituencies and only had one Member of the European Parliament each.

The constituency of Peak District was one of them.

It was named after the Peak District in the East Midlands and consisted of the Westminster Parliament constituencies (on their 1983 boundaries) of Amber Valley, Ashfield, Broxtowe, Erewash, High Peak, Staffordshire Moorlands, and West Derbyshire.

Arlene McCarthy of the Labour Party was this seat's only MEP.

== MEPs ==
Elected	Member	Party
1994	Arlene McCarthy	Labour
1999	Constituency abolished: see East Midlands	

== Election results ==
European Parliament election, 1994: Peak District
Party	Candidate	Votes	%	±%
Labour	Arlene McCarthy	105,853	53.1	
Conservative	Robin H. C. Fletcher	56,546	28.3	
Liberal Democrats	Mrs. Susan P. Barber	29,979	15.0	
Green	Mike J. Shipley	5,598	2.8	
Natural Law	David H. Collins	1,533	0.8	
Majority		49,307	24.8	
Turnout		199,509	39.0	
Labour win (new seat)				
