= Emma McClarkin =

British politician (born 1978)

Emma McClarkin OBE
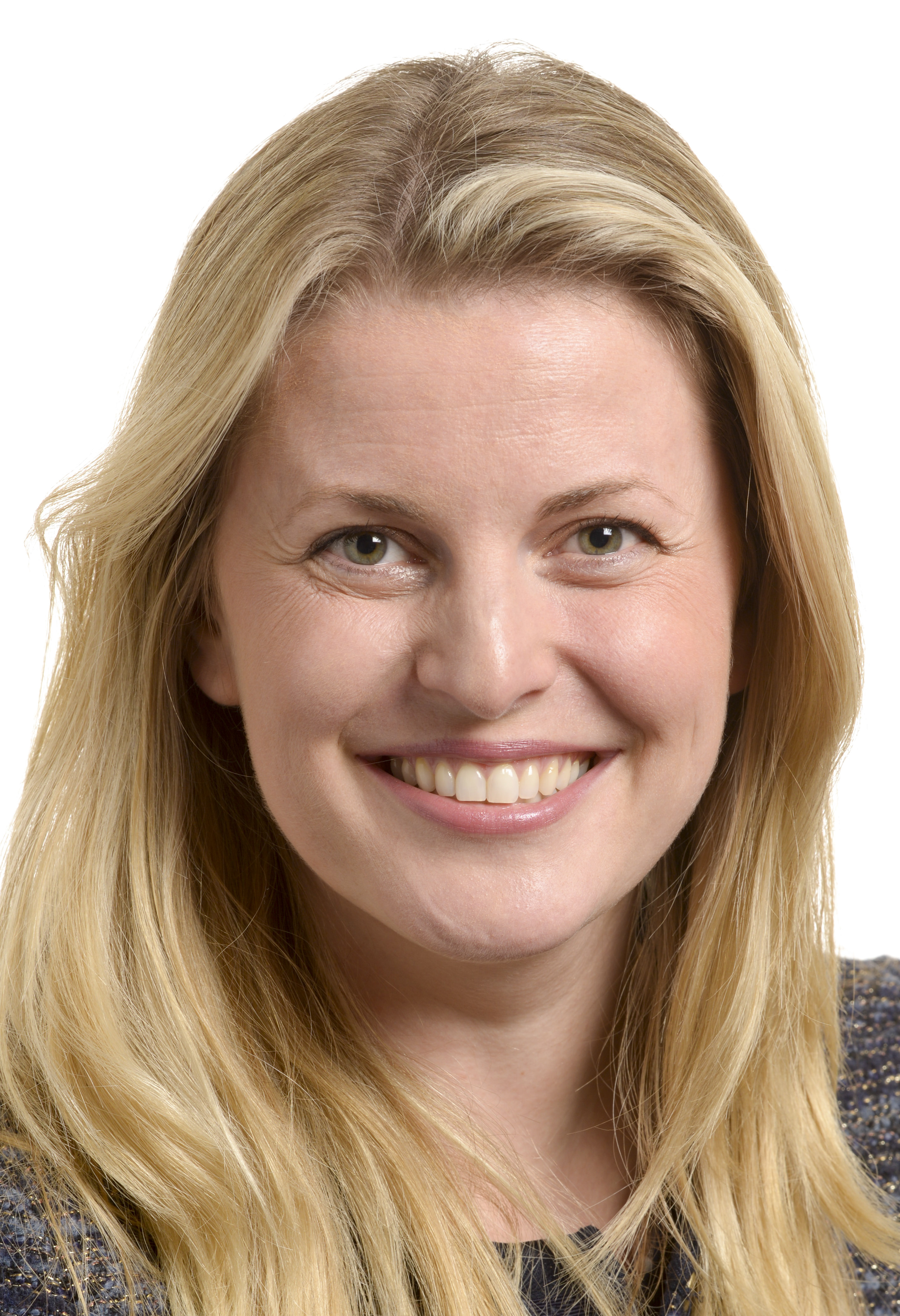

Member of the European Parliament for East Midlands
- In office 4 June 2009 – 1 July 2019
- Preceded by: Chris Heaton-Harris
- Succeeded by: Matthew Patten

Personal details
- Born: 9 October 1978 (age 47) Stroud, Gloucestershire, England
- Party: Conservative
- Education: Bournemouth University
- Occupation: MEP
- Profession: Politician
- Website: emmamcclarkin.com

Emma McClarkin OBE (born 9 October 1978) is a British Conservative Party politician who served as a Member of the European Parliament for the East Midlands region from 2009 to 2019. She was a spokesman for international trade for the Conservative Party. She is currently the Chief Executive of the British Beer and Pub Association.

== Early life and education ==
McClarkin was born in Stroud, Gloucestershire to George and Maria McClarkin. She attended Stroud Girls High School and graduated from Bournemouth University in 2001 with a Bachelor of Laws in Business Law. She started work as a law clerk.

== Career ==
McClarkin worked as a government relations executive for the Rugby Football Union.

In May 2009, McClarkin was one of five candidates elected to the European Parliament from the East Midlands Region. She was at that time the youngest elected member. She was re-elected in 2014. She has sat on a number of European Parliament Committees and delegations, including the Committee on International Trade, the Committee on Culture and Education and the Delegation for Relations with the United States.

In September 2019 McClarkin was appointed as chief executive of the British Beer and Pub Association (BBPA). She was appointed Officer of the Order of the British Empire (OBE) in the 2022 Birthday Honours for services to the hospitality sector, particularly during COVID-19.
