= Better Off Out =

UK political organisation

Better Off Out (BOO) was a non-party campaign that called for the United Kingdom (UK)'s withdrawal from the European Union (EU). It was run by The Freedom Association, a pressure group that describes itself as non-partisan, centre-right and libertarian, with links to the Conservative Party, The Brexit Party (now Reform UK) and the UK Independence Party (UKIP). The campaign was formed in 2006 and was based in Cheltenham, England.

== Supporters ==
The patrons of the campaign included Norman Tebbit, the former chairman of the Conservative Party as well as author Frederick Forsyth and Professor Tim Congdon, an economist and former UKIP PPC.

Bernard Weatherill, the former Speaker of the House of Commons, was also a patron of the campaign until his death.

=== Members of Parliament ===
Prior to the 2016 United Kingdom European Union membership referendum, Better Off Out was supported by a number of Conservative Members of Parliament including Peter Bone, Christopher Chope, David TC Davies, Philip Davies, Gordon Henderson, Philip Hollobone, David Nuttall, Heather Wheeler, Andrew Percy, Laurence Robertson and Richard Shepherd. A number of Conservative former members of parliament supported Better Off Out, including Lady Ann Winterton, Sir Nicholas Winterton, John Biffen, Eric Forth, Richard Body, Bob Spink, and Jonathan Aitken.

The former Labour MP for Great Grimsby, Austin Mitchell was also a supporter. There were a number of Democratic Unionist Party MPs and Members of the Northern Ireland Legislative Assembly, including their leader Peter Robinson and former leader Ian Paisley. Others included Gregory Campbell, Nigel Dodds, Jeffrey Donaldson, Dr. William McCrea, Ian Paisley Jr, Jim Shannon, David Simpson and Sammy Wilson as well as prominent members of the smaller Traditional Unionist Voice, including William Ross and former MEP Jim Allister.

Former UKIP MP Douglas Carswell and former MP Mark Reckless were signatories.

=== Members of the European Parliament ===
The Conservative MEPs at the time of the referendum David Campbell Bannerman, Roger Helmer (who subsequently left the Conservative party and joined UKIP) and Daniel Hannan also signed.

=== Academics and artists ===
Other non-political supporters included the academics Ruth Lea, Patrick Minford and Alan Walters.

=== Management Committee ===
- Committee chairman: John Kershaw
- Hon. Secretary: Tony Hilder
- Hon. Treasurer: Michael McGough, Sir Mark Worthington (ex official), Christopher Gill, Euan Stewart, Mark Wallace
- Chief Executive: Simon Richards
- Director: Rory Broomfield
- Head of Campaigns: Andrew Allison
- Campaigns Manager: Rupert Matthews

== Conservative Party blacklisting ==
In March 2007 the Conservative Central Office warned its party membership that BOO was contrary to Conservative Party policy.

== See also ==
- Euroscepticism
- Brexit
- Russian interference in the 2016 Brexit referendum
