= Annunziata Rees-Mogg =

British politician (born 1979)

The Honourable Annunziata Rees-Mogg
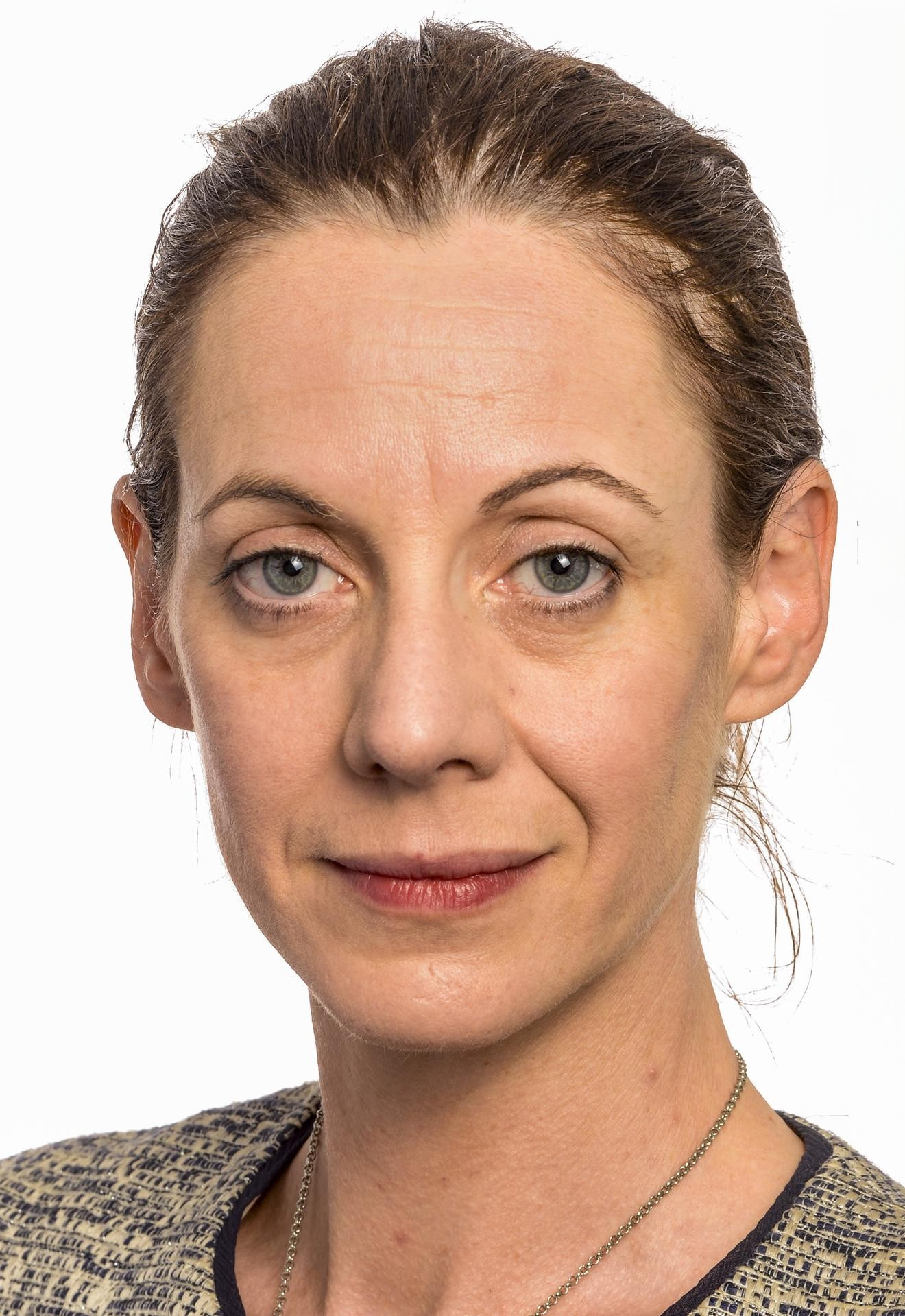
- Official portrait, 2019

Member of the European Parliament for East Midlands
- In office 2 July 2019 – 31 January 2020
- Preceded by: Margot Parker
- Succeeded by: Constituency abolished

Personal details
- Born: 25 March 1979 (age 47) Bath, Somerset, England
- Party: Conservative (1984–2019; 2020–present)
- Other political affiliations: Independent (2019–2020); Brexit (2019)
- Spouse: Matthew Glanville (m. 2010)
- Children: 3
- Parent(s): William Rees-Mogg, Baron Rees-Mogg; Gillian Morris
- Relatives: Jacob Rees-Mogg (brother)
- Occupation: Politician, journalist

Annunziata Mary Rees-Mogg (/əˌnʊntsiˈɑːtə/; born 25 March 1979) is a British freelance journalist whose focus is finance, economics, and European politics. She was a Brexit Party, then Conservative politician, during 2019 and into early 2020. Rees-Mogg has been a leader writer for The Daily Telegraph, deputy editor of MoneyWeek, and editor of the European Journal, a Eurosceptic magazine owned by Bill Cash's think tank, the European Foundation.

Formerly active in Conservative Party politics, Rees-Mogg was added to the party's A-List by David Cameron. She stood unsuccessfully as a Conservative parliamentary candidate in the 2005 and 2010 general elections. On 12 April 2019, Rees-Mogg was selected as a candidate for the Brexit Party in the East Midlands constituency in the European Parliament elections and won a seat. She resigned the party whip in December 2019 to support the Conservative Party's Brexit strategy. She rejoined the Conservative Party in January 2020.

== Early life and education ==
Annunziata Mary Rees-Mogg is one of the daughters of William Rees-Mogg, Lord Rees-Mogg, a former editor of The Times, and his wife Gillian Shakespeare Morris; she is the youngest sister of Jacob Rees-Mogg.

She joined the Conservative Party at the age of five. She later said of this "I was too young to be a Young Conservative, so I joined the main party. Aged eight I was out canvassing, proudly wearing my rosette."

She was educated at Godolphin and Latymer School in Hammersmith, West London, an independent day school for girls. There, she took A Levels in History, Chemistry and Economics, which she has called "a very odd mix".

== Career ==
After leaving school in 1997, she decided against going to university, and instead tried a series of different jobs in journalism, investment banking, publishing, public relations, and stockbroking. In 1998, she moved with her family to Mells, Somerset.

In 2003, she set up Trust the People, a campaign for a referendum on the European Constitution aimed at those too young to have voted in the Common Market referendum of 1975. Speaking about the 2003 Iraq War, she subsequently said, "I think it was a terrible mistake". She opposed the Hunting Act 2004, which outlawed hunting of wild mammals with dogs.

In the 2005 general election, Rees-Mogg came fourth in the safe Labour seat of Aberavon, South Wales, increasing the Conservative vote from 2,296 to 3,064.

She was selected as prospective parliamentary candidate for Somerton and Frome in 2006. The Observer said of her, "Having enjoyed finance and journalism, she combined the two in a career as a financial journalist. When she turns to discussing Gordon Brown's economic record, she does so with authority." In November 2007, she wrote an article for MoneyWeek magazine entitled "How to profit from the world's water crisis", setting out some of the investment opportunities in the sector. An article in The Sunday Telegraph in October 2009 reported, "Some high-profile women are already installed in winnable seats: Louise Bagshawe [now Mensch], Annunziata Rees-Mogg, Priti Patel, Laura Sandys and Joanne Cash will all make colourful additions to the Tory benches." However, at the 2010 general election, Rees-Mogg failed to take the Somerton and Frome seat from the sitting Liberal Democrat member David Heath.

It was reported that in advance of the 2010 election David Cameron had asked Rees-Mogg to shorten her name for political purposes to Nancy Mogg, which her brother Jacob has since said was "a joke". Rees-Mogg later commented: "I think it's phoney to pretend to be someone you're not." Cameron subsequently dropped her from the Conservative Party's 2011 pre-selections, despite strong support from many female party members.

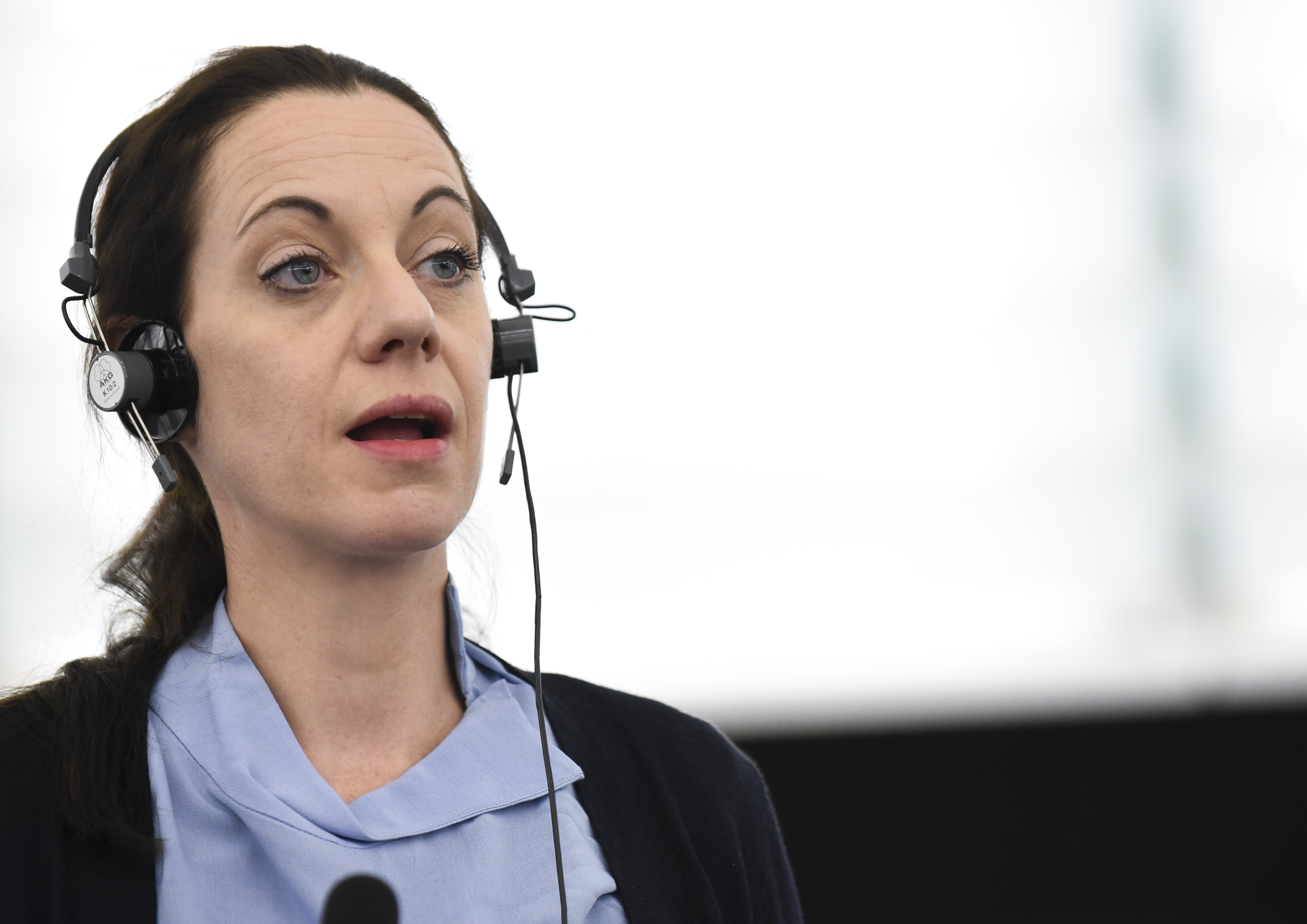
Rees-Mogg in 2019

Having been elected as a MEP for the Brexit Party at the 2019 European Parliamentary elections and serving for seven months, Rees Mogg defected very prominently back to her former party, the Conservatives. She defected just one week prior to the UK 2019 General Election, urging voters to vote Conservative. Rees-Mogg sat as an independent in the European Parliament for a month and became a Conservative MEP in January 2020, just three weeks before the UK left the EU and the UK MEP positions were abolished.

During 2019, before her tactically timed defection away from the party, Rees-Mogg had been a high-profile Brexit Party backer and advocate. The Brexit Party has since become the political party Reform UK.

Rees-Mogg was a Member of the European Parliament (MEP) for the East Midlands region from May 2019 until the United Kingdom's withdrawal from the EU on 31 January 2020.

In July 2025, Rees-Mogg said on the Jeremy Vine show that it was wrong to call for the death of Israeli soldiers accused of killing Palestinian children in Gaza. When pressed by Vine "How can we not be angry about that?" she replied "How can we not support our allies?"

== Personal life ==
Rees-Mogg married Matthew Glanville on 6 November 2010 in Lucca, Italy. The couple have three children. Prior to the birth of their third child, Rees-Mogg revealed she had miscarried triplets in February 2019.
