= Jonathan Bullock =

British politician (born 1963)

Jonathan Bullock FRSA
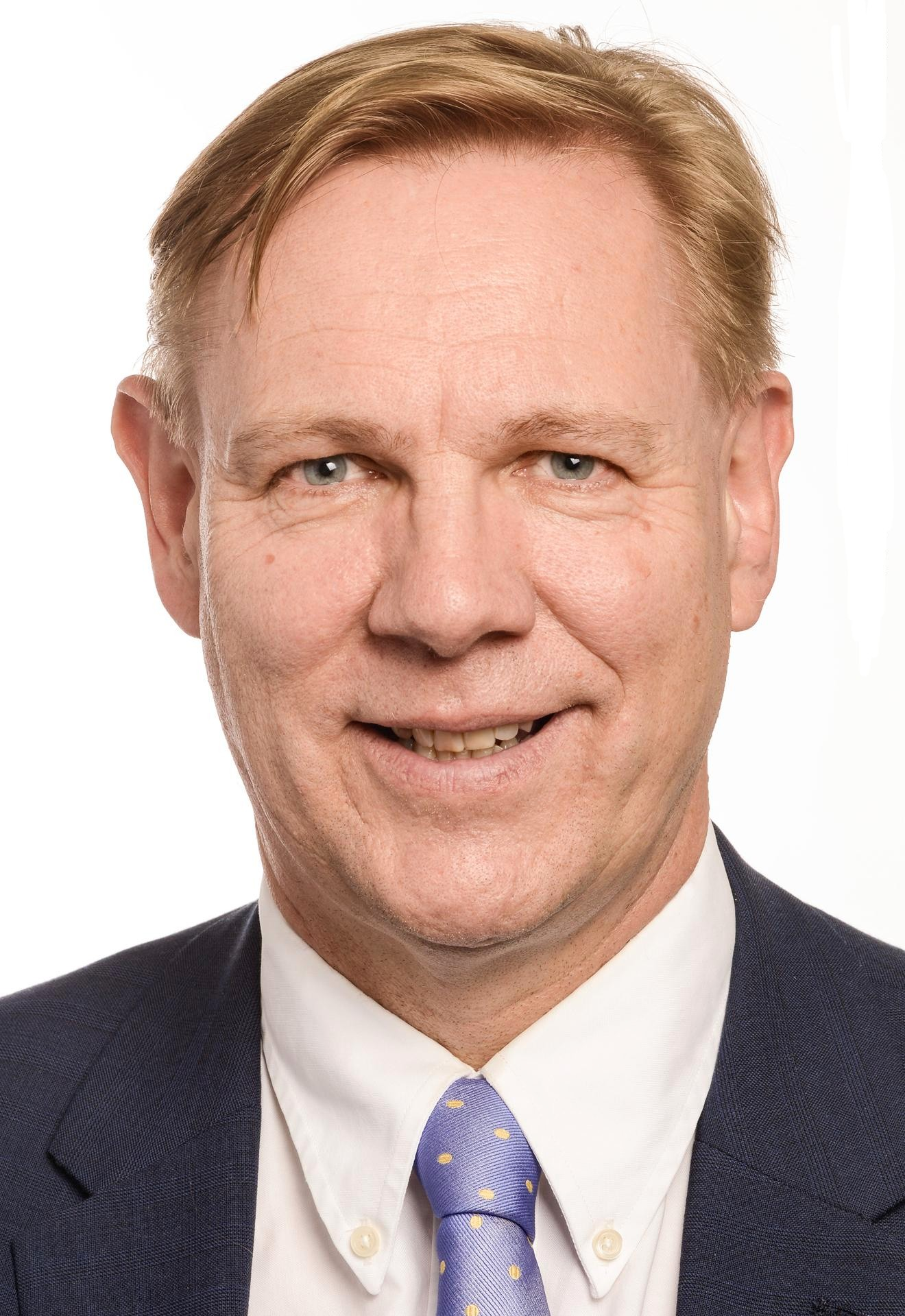
- Bullock in 2019

Member of the European Parliament for East Midlands
- In office 28 July 2017 – 31 January 2020
- Preceded by: Roger Helmer
- Succeeded by: Constituency abolished

Personal details
- Born: 3 March 1963 (age 63) Nottingham, Nottinghamshire, England
- Party: Reform UK (since 2019)
- Other political affiliations: Independent (2018–2019); UKIP (2012–2018); Conservative (before 2012)
- Education: Nottingham High School
- Alma mater: Portsmouth University

Jonathan Bullock FRSA (born 3 March 1963) is an English politician. He was a Member of the European Parliament (MEP) for the East Midlands constituency until the United Kingdom's withdrawal from the EU on 31 January 2020. He was third on the UKIP list for that constituency in the 2014 European election, and became an MEP on 1 August 2017, succeeding Roger Helmer. He was re-elected in 2019 for the Brexit Party.

Bullock was previously a councillor and member of the cabinet on Kettering Borough Council and a Conservative parliamentary and European candidate. He resigned from the Conservative Party in September 2012 to join UKIP, but left in December 2018 and joined the Brexit Party four months later.

== Early life and education ==
Bullock was born on 3 March 1963 in Nottingham. He attended Nottingham High School before studying at Portsmouth, receiving a BA (Hons) degree in politics. He is a Fellow of the Royal Society of Arts (FRSA).

== Early career ==
Bullock began his career working in the House of Commons for MPs Andrew Stewart and Sir Richard Ottaway. He then went onto work in advertising agencies, becoming an account director responsible for a number of accounts. Subsequently he worked for the Advertising Association (1994–1997) and for the British Road Federation (1997–2001), both in similar head of public relations roles. He was appointed Director of Policy at the Chartered Institute of Logistics and Transport in the UK in 2002, working there for five years.

== Political career ==
For the Conservative Party, Bullock fought the Parliamentary seats of Manchester Gorton (1992) and Gedling (2001) and the 2004 European Parliament election in the East Midlands constituency. He was elected to Kettering Borough Council in 2007, representing the ward of Queen Eleanor & Buccleuch; in the same year he was appointed to the Cabinet of the Council, He was re-elected to Kettering Borough Council in 2011 in the same ward.

Bullock moved to UKIP in 2012, citing disillusionment with David Cameron and the Conservative Party concerning the European Union, as well as the general leftward drift of the Conservative Party. For UKIP he fought the Northamptonshire County Council seat of Ise in 2013 and 2017, and also the 2014 European Parliament election, where he was third on the party list. Following the retirement of Roger Helmer at the end of July 2017, Bullock moved up the list to succeed Helmer as an MEP for East Midlands on 1 August 2017.

He resigned from UKIP in December 2018 over a breach of the party's constitution by leader Gerard Batten, but remained in the Europe of Freedom and Direct Democracy group in the European Parliament.

He joined the Brexit Party in February 2019 and was re-elected in 2019.
