= Matthew Patten (judge) =

New Hampshire judge (b. 1719, d. 1795)

Matthew Patten (May 19, 1719 – August 27, 1795) was an eighteenth-century judge and a resident of Bedford, New Hampshire. The diary he kept from 1744 to 1788 has been an important source for historians of New Hampshire.

== Biography ==
Patten was born in Ireland but moved to the Thirteen Colonies in 1728 at the age of 9. He was appointed justice of the peace in 1751 and held that post until his death. In 1776 and 1777 he represented Bedford and Merrimack in the general courts.

== Published works ==
- The Diary Of Matthew Patten Of Bedford, N.H. 1754-1788 (Rumford Printing Co., 1903; reprinted by Picton Press, 1993)
