= Arlene McCarthy =

British politician (born 1960)

Arlene McCarthy OBE
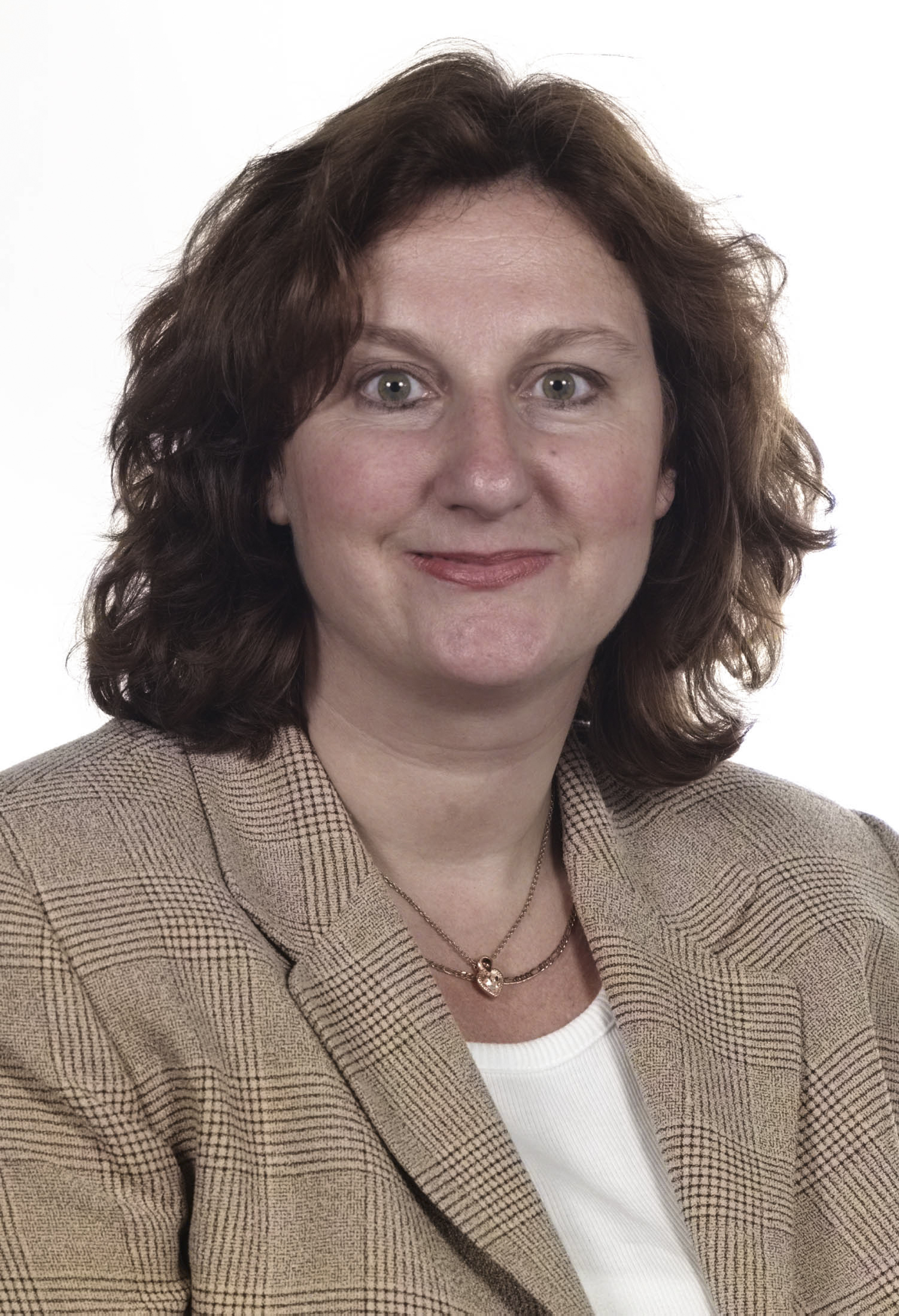
- McCarthy in 1999

Member of the European Parliament for North West England Peak District (1994–1999)
- In office 19 July 1994 – 1 July 2014
- Preceded by: Constituency established
- Succeeded by: Theresa Griffin

Personal details
- Born: 10 October 1960 (age 65) Belfast, Northern Ireland, United Kingdom
- Party: Labour
- Other political affiliations: Progressive Alliance of Socialists and Democrats
- Education: University of Manchester
- Website: www.theresagriffin.eu

Arlene McCarthy OBE (born 10 October 1960) was a British Labour Party politician who served as a Member of the European Parliament for the Peak District (European Parliament constituency) from 1994 to 1999 and for North West England from 1999 to 2014.

== Career before politics ==
McCarthy graduated from South Bank Polytechnic (now London South Bank University) in 1983 with BA (Hons) proceeding to attend the Free University of Berlin and then later attending the University of Manchester to conduct PhD studies.

After completing studies McCarthy was employed as a lecturer in International Politics and Regional Studies at the Free University of Berlin, and was also employed at the European Parliament working for the Labour MEP Glyn Ford.

Upon returning to Britain McCarthy worked as the Principal European Liaison Officer at Kirklees Metropolitan Borough Council, until her election to the European Parliament.

== European Parliament ==
First elected in 1994 for the newly-formed Peak District constituency, which stretched from Derbyshire's border with Greater Manchester down to the suburbs of Nottingham, McCarthy was re-elected in 1999 to represent the adjacent, newly formed North West England constituency which used Proportional Representation. Having represented the same constituency since, she was top of the list of candidates from the Labour Party at the 2009 European elections.

McCarthy held a number of positions within Parliament. As the Labour Party was a member of the Party of European Socialists, she sat in the Progressive Alliance of Socialists and Democrats parliamentary group. McCarthy was Chair of the Parliament's Committee on Internal Market and Consumer Protection and, later, vice-chair of the Committee on Economic and Monetary Affairs.

In January 2014 McCarthy announced she would not be seeking re-election in the June 2014 European Parliament Election.

She was appointed Officer of the Order of the British Empire (OBE) in the 2015 New Year Honours.
