= Matthew Patten (politician) =

Former Brexit Party politician (born 1962)

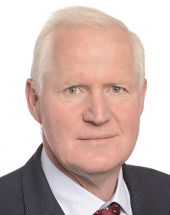

Member of the European Parliament for East Midlands
- In office 2 July 2019 – 31 January 2020
- Preceded by: Emma McClarkin
- Succeeded by: Constituency abolished

Personal details
- Born: 21 May 1962 (age 63) Bishop's Stortford, Hertfordshire, England
- Other political affiliations: Brexit (2019–2021); Conservative (until 2019)

Matthew Richard Patten (born 21 May 1962) is a former British politician. He was a Member of the European Parliament (MEP) for the East Midlands between 2019 and the United Kingdom's withdrawal from the EU on 31 January 2020. He had previously been a Conservative councillor for Bradfield, Wix and Wrabness in Tendring District, Essex.

Patten was once the Chief Executive of the cricket and disability sports charity The Lord's Taverners. He was the Chief Executive for the social mobility charity Mayor's Fund for London from 2012 until 2018, and spoke at the November 2017 ACEVO conference on the third sector. In 2015, he called for a watchdog similar to Ofsted to "improve performance, prevent abuse and give confidence to funders and other stakeholders" within British charities.

In the European Parliament he was appointed a member of the Employment and Social Affairs Committee, the Delegation for Relations with Iran and the Delegation to the EU-North Macedonia Joint Parliamentary Committee.

He was the Brexit Party's prospective parliamentary candidate for Clacton for the 2019 general election, but withdrew when Nigel Farage announced the party would not contest Tory-held seats.

He is currently the CEO of Fix Britain (https://fixbritain.com/leadership-team/).
