= Pullein-Thompson =

Pullein-Thompson is the family name of:

- Charlotte Pullein-Thompson (born 1957), British pony and cookbook writer
- Christine Pullein-Thompson (1925–2005), British pony book writer
- Denis Cannan (1919–2011), British playwright born Pullein-Thompson
- Diana Pullein-Thompson (1925–2015), British pony book writer
- Josephine Pullein-Thompson MBE (1924–2014), British pony book writer and PEN International
- Joanna Cannan (1896–1961), British pony book writer. Mrs Pullein-Thompson
