= Charlotte Pullein-Thompson =

British writer (born 1957)

Charlotte Pullein-Thompson (born 1957), also known as Charlotte Popescu, is an author of cookbooks and books related to horses and ponies. Although she married and became Charlotte Fyfe, she has not published under her married name.

Daughter of children's author Christine Pullein-Thompson, niece of Denis Cannan, Diana Pullein-Thompson and Josephine Pullein-Thompson. She is great granddaughter of Charles Cannan and Mary Wedderburn, granddaughter of Joanna Cannan, great niece of May Cannan. She is also related to poet May Wedderburn Cannan and dramatist Gilbert Cannan.

Following her mother's, aunt's and grandmother's steps, she has published pony books, although she has branched out in other areas.

== Pony Books ==
- Pony Care from A-Z
- Horse and Pony Quiz Book No. 1
- Horse and Pony Quiz Books No. 2
- Horses at Work (History in focus)

She also drew the illustrations for her mother's Follyfoot Pony Quiz Book (1974).

== Other books ==
- The Apple Cookbook
- The Summer Fruits Cookbook
- The Honey Cookbook
- The Autumn Fruits Cookbook
- Best Hens For You: Choosing Breeds for the Garden
- Fruits of the Hedgerow and Unusual Garden Fruits: Gather them, Cook them, Eat them
- Hens in the Garden, Eggs in the Kitchen
- Vegetables: Grow Them, Cook Them, Eat Them
- Wild Food, Garden Food - Gather and Cook through the Year
- Chicken Runs and Vegetable Plots
- Chickopedia
- The Tears of War; the Love Story of a Young Poet and a War Hero: May Wedderburn Cannan and Bevil Quiller-Couch
- War's Long Shadow: 69 Months of the Second World War (editor)

== Filmography ==
- Fuerteventura Naturally (2004) as herself - (Parafotos Films)
