= The French Mistress =

1955 play by Sonnie Hale

- Original language: English
- Written by: Sonnie Hale
- Genre: Comedy

Premiere
- Date: 16 May 1955
- Place: Prince of Wales Theatre, Cardiff

The French Mistress is a comedy play by the British entertainer Sonnie Hale under the pen name Robert Munro about the arrival of a new young French teacher at a traditional public school.

It premiered at the Prince of Wales Theatre, Cardiff in May 1955. Four years later it enjoyed a West End run of 185 performances, first at the Adelphi Theatre before transferring to the Prince's Theatre. The cast included Hugh Wakefield and Richard Bird.

== Cast and Performance Locations ==
Performed at Adelphi Theatre, Strand, London, 13 Jun 1959; presented by Jack Hylton; directed by Joan Riley; settings by Denis Wreford Transferred to: Prince's Theatre, London, closing performance, 21 Nov 1959; Theatre Royal, Windsor, April 1959

Originally at: Prince of Wales Theatre, Cardiff, 16 May 1955, then Wimbledon Theatre, 20 June 1955; directed by Robert Monro

On tour: October to December 1956, starring Jack Buchanan

Casts: Sonnie Hale, Kathleen St John, John Law, Nigel Beard, Robin Lloyd, Juliet Winsor, Bruce Heighley, Kenneth Outwin, Olive Milbourne, Sydney King, Nicholas Stevenson, Gary Watson, Susan Maryott, Anthony Green, Richard Ives, Colin Wall, Christopher Sandford, Kenneth Laird, Richard Bird, Rosamond Burne, Peter Gray, Scot Finch, Michael Meacham, Marie-Claire Verlene, Pearson Dodd, Richard Fox, Peter Greenspan, David Lord, Hugh Wakefield

== Adaptation ==
In 1960 it was turned into a film A French Mistress directed by Roy Boulting and starring Cecil Parker, Agnès Laurent, James Robertson Justice and Ian Bannen. (The same theme should be compared to Tamahine, 1963, by Denis Cannan).

== Bibliography ==
- Goble, Alan. The Complete Index to Literary Sources in Film. Walter de Gruyter, 1999.
- Wearing, J.P. The London Stage 1950-1959: A Calendar of Productions, Performers, and Personnel. Rowman & Littlefield, 2014.
