= Fidra Books =

Children's book publisher based in Edinburgh

Fidra Books is a publisher based in Edinburgh specialising in reissues of bygone children's books, mainly those from the 1940s onwards.

== Foundation and range ==
The firm was set up in 2005 by Malcolm and Vanessa Robertson, who also opened Edinburgh's one dedicated Children's Bookshop in November 2007, and in 2010 a general bookshop in the same street.

Fidra Books specialises in reprinting children's books that it believes to be wrongly neglected. Fidra Books enables collectors to acquire books they have been searching for and for new readers to find older stories. Its books range from 1930s adventure stories to 1960s fantasy novels.

== Publishing ==
The firm's first publication was Margot Pardoe's The Far Island in 1936. Its other output has covered pony books by authors such as K. M. Peyton and Josephine Pullein-Thompson and titles in classic genres such as adventure and school stories.

Other Fidra Books authors have included Olivia FitzRoy, Anne Digby, Victoria Walker, Primrose Cumming, Elinor Lyon, Mabel Esther Allan, and Ruby Ferguson. These books have reappeared as larger-format paperbacks with thick paper and stiff card covers. Fidra Books uses in its reprints elements of the original dust wrapper; all contain a foreword.
