= May Wedderburn Cannan =

British poet (1893–1973)

- Born: 14 October 1893; Oxford, England, United Kingdom
- Died: 11 December 1973 (aged 80)
- Citizenship: United Kingdom
- Occupation: Poet
- Spouses: Bevil Quiller-Couch (-1919); Percival James Slater
- Relatives: Joanna Cannan (sister); Edwin Cannan (uncle); Gilbert Cannan (cousin); Pullein-Thompson sisters (nieces); Denis Cannan (nephew); Charlotte Pullein-Thompson (great niece)
- Writing career
- Language: English
- Period: British World War I
- Genre: Poetry
- Subject: World War I

May Wedderburn Cannan (14 October 1893 – 11 December 1973) was a British poet who was active in World War I.

== Biography ==
=== Early life ===
May was the second of three daughters of Charles Cannan, Dean of Trinity College, Oxford (He was in charge at the Oxford University Press from 1895 until his death in 1919).

In 1911, at the age of 18, she joined the Voluntary Aid Detachment, training as a nurse and eventually reaching the rank of Quartermaster. Sharon Ouditt, writing of women's role in the war, noted that: "For the nurses it was, like the nun's cross, the badge of their equal sacrifice." In a poem by May Wedderburn Cannan the Red Cross sign is seen to be equivalent to the crossed swords indicating her lover's death in battle:

And all you asked of fame
Was crossed swords in the Army List,
My Dear, against your name.

During the war, she went to Rouen in the spring of 1915, helping to run the canteen at the railhead there for four weeks, then returning to help her father at the Oxford University Press, but finally returning to France in the espionage department at the War Office Department in Paris (1918), where she was finally reunited with her fiancé Bevil Quiller-Couch.

Cannan published three volumes of poetry during and after the war. These were In War Time (1917), The Splendid Days (1919) which was dedicated to Bevil Quiller-Couch, and The House of Hope (1923), dedicated to her father. In 1934, she wrote one novel The Lonely Generation.

Philip Larkin chose her poem "Rouen" to be included in the Oxford Book of Twentieth Century English Verse (1973), commenting that it "had all the warmth and idealism of the VADS in the First World War. I find it enchanting".

=== Later life ===
Although Cannan ceased writing for publication in the 1920s, in her final years she completed an autobiographical work entitled Grey Ghosts and Voices (1976). The book looks back to her Edwardian childhood, the war years and those years immediately afterwards.

Further unpublished poems, from a handwritten notebook, were published in The Tears of War (2000) by her great-niece Charlotte Fyfe, which also tells the story of her love affair with Bevil Quiller-Couch through autobiographical extracts and the letters from Bevil to Cannan.

== Family ==
She was the sister of the novelist Joanna Cannan. She was the daughter of the academic Charles Cannan and cousin to the British novelist and playwright Gilbert Cannan. She is also aunt to the Pullein-Thompson sisters and the British dramatist and playwright Denis Cannan, and a great-aunt of Charlotte Popescu (Christine Pullein-Thompson's daughter).

She was engaged to Bevil Quiller-Couch, son of Sir Arthur Quiller-Couch. Bevil served as gunner in World War I, and survived without injury only to die in the Spanish flu pandemic in 1919. She subsequently married Percival James Slater, a balloonist in World War I, and promoted to Brigadier in World War II.

== Radio programme ==
In 2002, BBC Radio 4 presented a dramatised version of The Tears of War as the afternoon play for Armistice Day.

== Bibliography ==
- "Recollections of a British Red Cross Voluntary Aid Detachment, No. 12, May Wedderburn Cannan, (1971) Oxford University, March 26th, 1911-April 24, 1919", TS.
- In War Time, Oxford, May Wedderburn Cannan, 1917.
- The Splendid Days, May Wedderburn Cannan, Blackwell, 1919.
- The House of Hope, May Wedderburn Cannan, 1923.
- The Lonely Generation, Hutchinson Publishers Ltd., 1934.
- Grey Ghosts and Voices, May Wedderburn Cannan; Roundwood Press; 1976; ISBN 0-900093-50-1
- The Tears of War: The Love Story of a Young Poet and a War Hero, May Wedderburn Cannan; Publisher: Cavalier Books; 2000; ISBN 1-899470-18-2
- First World War Poems by Andrew Motion, Thomas Hardy, Rupert Brooke, Helen Mackay, Julian Grenfell, W.B. Yeats, May Wedderburn Cannan, Charles Hamilton Sorley, Edward Thomas; Publisher: Faber and Faber; 2003; ISBN 0-641-68558-0
- 'Great Expectations': Rehabilitating the Recalcitrant War Poets, Gill Plain, Feminist Review, No. 51 (Autumn, 1995), pp. 41–65
- Fighting Forces, Writing Women: Identity and Ideology in the First World War., Sharon Ouditt, Routledge,1994.
