= A French Mistress =

1960 British film by Roy Boulting

- Original British quad poster
- Directed by: Roy Boulting
- Screenplay by: Roy Boulting; Jeffrey Dell
- Based on: play The French Mistress by Sonnie Hale
- Produced by: John Boulting
- Starring: Cecil Parker; James Robertson Justice; Ian Bannen
- Cinematography: Mutz Greenbaum
- Edited by: John Jympson
- Music by: John Addison
- Production company: Charter Film Productions
- Distributed by: British Lion (U.K.); Films Around the World (U.S.)
- Release date: 25 August 1960 (London)
- Running time: 98 minutes
- Country: United Kingdom
- Language: English

A French Mistress is a 1960 British comedy film directed by Roy Boulting and starring Cecil Parker, James Robertson Justice, Agnès Laurent, Ian Bannen, Raymond Huntley, Irene Handl and Thorley Walters.

It is based on a stage play, The French Mistress by Sonnie Hale under the pen name Robert Monro, first produced in May 1955 at the Prince of Wales Theatre, Cardiff, starring Hale.

== Production ==
Production was filmed at Shoreditch Training College, Englefield Green, Borough of Runnymede, Surrey, England, formerly the Royal Indian Engineering College.

== Plot summary ==
A young French woman, Madaleine Lafarge, is unintentionally appointed as the French teacher at an English public school for boys, which is not used to having women teachers. She causes a stir with pupils and other school staff, and complications ensue.

A romance develops between Lafarge and the headmaster's son who is also a teacher at the school. This is a cause of concern for the headmaster when he comes to believe that she is his daughter, from an affair he had during a holiday in France in his youth. He attempts to stop the romance by sacking her, so that she will go back to France, but the boys go on strike and nearly riot. All the problems are resolved when it becomes apparent that she cannot be his daughter.

== Cast ==
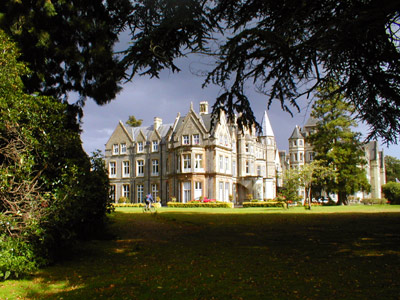
Film location, 2004

- Cecil Parker as Headmaster John Crane
- James Robertson Justice as Robert Martin
- Ian Bannen as Colin Crane
- Agnès Laurent as Madeleine LaFarge
- Raymond Huntley as Reverend Edwin Peake
- Irene Handl as Staff Sergeant Hodges
- Edith Sharpe as Matron
- Kenneth Griffith as Mr. Meade
- Robert Bruce as Mr. Ramsay
- Thorley Walters as Colonel Edmonds
- Henry Longhurst as 2nd Governor
- Brian Oulton as 3rd Governor
- Scot Finch as Edmonds, Head Boy
- Richard Palmer as Milsom
- Peter Greenspan as Wigram
- David Griffin as Slater
- Jeremy Bulloch as Baines
- David Diarmid Cammell as Vane
- Chris Sandford as Poole
- Gregory Warwick as Warwick
- Nigel Bulloch as Proffit
- Gordon Pleasant as Benson
- Michael Crawford as Kent
- Pearson Dodd as Church
- Christopher Beeny as Stephenson
- Athene Seyler as Beatrice Peake
- Cardew Robinson as Ambulance Attendant
- Margaret Lacey as kitchen Maid
- Paul Sheridan as M Fraguier, Previous French Teacher

== Reception ==
=== Box office ===
Kine Weekly called it a "money maker" at the British box office in 1960.

=== Critical ===
The Monthly Film Bulletin wrote: "A mildly amusing, quintessentially English farce, with stock material and jokes. But its stage origins give its plot some shape and its characters some consistency, while the relaxed and confident playing of Cecil Parker and James Robertson Justice in familiar roles makes the most of the few effective moments of dry humour. Given more wit or a wilder series of complications, given above all some relation to contemporary English life . . . so the reservations creep in. It is time surely that we pensioned off, even in farce, these phoney English public schools, fire-eating colonels, bird-watching vicars, sporty cane-brandishers and all the other dearly loved images of "the English as they see themselves"."

Variety wrote: "Billed as a "romp," the Boulting Brothers' latest entry grapples tenaciously with a fairly frail joke which doesn't stand up to its early promise. Based on a stage comedy ... it owes much to some determined comedy acting by well-tried British character thesps. ... Roy Boulting's direction is sufficiently light of touch to provide a reasonable quota of mild amusement. ... [it] is occasionally inclined to snigger at sex in a rather adolescent way, but, on the whole, it is a reasonable diversion for unsophisticated audiences."

Bosley Crowther in The New York Times wrote, "We would have expected something better from the Boultings and Mr. Dell. A good cast of old familiars—excepting Agnes Laurent, a newcomer who plays the mademoiselle – try to do something with it and occasionally do all right with a line here, a facial expression or a situation there. Cecil Parker puffs and pouts as the headmaster, and Ian Bannen stands up stoutly as his son. Raymond Huntley and James Robertson Justice do their acts as other masters in the school. Irene Handl also draws a few fast laughs as the compulsively pugnacious cook, and Edith Sharpe and Athene Seyler cluck politely as the only other females around the place. But the ministrations of the stalwarts do not quite save the day. The Boultings are onto a sticky wicket with that silly sex-scandal stuff."

Leslie Halliwell said: "Sloppy, predicable comedy with practised performers getting a few easy laughs. The producers tried to excuse its imperfections by promoting it as a 'romp'."

The Radio Times Guide to Films gave the film 2/5 stars, writing: "Roy Boulting was past his comic prime by the time he made this underwhelming boys' school comedy, produced, as ever, by twin brother John, and co-scripted by longtime partner Jeffrey Dell. All those familiar faces should at least have given the action a certain cosy appeal, but they are left high and dry by a script that is little more than a bumper collection of sniggering bike-shed jokes about sex and French women."

== Theme ==
Tamahine, three years later (1963), used the same theme.
