= Judith Berrisford =

British author (1921–2008)

Judith Mary Berrisford (1921–2008) was a British writer of children's pony stories which are very similar to those of the Pullein-Thompson sisters, as well as other animal story and books on gardening.

Berrisford was born in Fenton, Staffordshire in 1921. She also wrote under the name Amanda Hope.

Berrisford married Clifford Lewis in 1945, with whom she wrote under the name Judith M. Berrisford. As of 1974, Berrisford was living in Deganwy, Wales, but moved to Ramsey, Isle of Man in 1976. She died there in 2008, at the age of 87.

== Bibliography ==
=== As Judith Berrisford ===
==== Jackie books ====
- Jackie Won a Pony (1958)
- Ten Ponies and Jackie (1959)
- Jackie's Pony Patrol (1961)
- Jackie's Pony Camp Summer (also published as Jackie and the Pony Camp Summer) (1968)
- Jackie and the Pony Trekkers (1971)
- Jackie's Show Jumping Surprise (also published as Jackie's Showjumping Surprise) (1972)
- Jackie and the Pony Boys (also published as Jackie and the Pony-Boys) (1973)
- Jackie and the Misfit Pony (1975)
- Jackie on Pony Island (1977)
- Jackie and the Pony Thieves (1978)
- Jackie and the Phantom Ponies (1979)
- Jackie and the Moonlight Pony (1980)
- Jackie and the Pony Rivals (1981)
- Jackie and the Missing Showjumper (1982)
- Change Ponies Jackie! (1983)
- Jackie's Steeplechase Adventure (1984)

==== Other pony books ====
- Timber - The Story of a Horse (1950)
- Sue's Circus Horse (1951)
- Red Rocket, Mystery Horse (1952)
- The Ponies Next Door (1954)
- Rustlers in the New Forest (1954)
- Ponies All Summer (1956)
- Pony Forest Adventure (1957)
- A Pony in the Family (1959)
- Trouble at Ponyways (1960)
- A Colt In the Family (1962)
- Nobody's Pony (1962)
- Five Foals and Philippa (1963)
- A Show Jumper in the Family (1964)
- Sue's TV Pony (1964)
- Pony-Trekkers, Go Home! (1982)
- Sabotage at Stableways (1982)
- Pippa's Mystery Horse (1983)
- Too Many Ponies for Pippa (1984)
- Pippa & The Midnight Ponies (1985)
- The Judith Berrisford Book of Pony Care (non-fiction) (1987)

Dates unknown

- The Pony Club Annual No 4 (contributor)

==== Other children's books ====
- Taff the sheepdog (1949)
- And Polar sailed too (1951)
- Jim and Patsy on the farm (1952)
- Joker The Foxhound (1953)
- Son of Darky (1953)
- Skipper - The Dog from the sea (1955)
- Trot Home Sally (1955)
- Game Warden's Son (1956)
- Skipper and The Headland Four (1957)
- A Dog called Scamp (1958)
- Daffodil Island (1958)
- Skipper's Exciting Summer (1959)
- Son Of Taff (1959)
- The Cats of Winkle Bay (1959)
- Skipper and the Runaway Boy (1960)
- Skipper and Son (1961)
- SOS For Sheepdog Taff (1963)
- Taff and the Stolen Ponies (1965)
- The Far-from-home cats (1967)
- Skipper To The Rescue (1977)

==== Gardening books ====
- Irises (1961)
- The Small Shrub Garden (also published as A Small Scrub Garden) (1961)
- Gardening on Lime (1963)
- Rhododendrons and Azaleas (1964)
- The Wild Garden (1966)
- The Very Small Garden: Unlimited Ideas for Limited Space (1968)
- The Young Gardener (1970)
- Window Box And Container Gardening (1974)
- Backyards and Tiny Gardens (1976)
- Gardening on Chalk, Lime & Clay (1978)
- The Weekend Garden (also published as Weekend Gardener) (1978)

=== As Amanda Hope ===
- The Pengelly Face (1977)
- Mistress of Eden (1979)
- Lord of Glenjerrick (1979)
