= Colin Higgins =

Australian-American filmmaker (1941–1988)

- Born: 28 July 1941; Nouméa, New Caledonia, France
- Died: 5 August 1988 (aged 47); Beverly Hills, California, U.S.
- Education: Stanford University; UCLA
- Occupations: Film director, screenwriter, playwright
- Years active: 1971–1987

Colin Higgins (28 July 1941 – 5 August 1988) was an Australian-American film director, screenwriter, and playwright. He achieved prominence for writing and producing the 1971 film Harold and Maude. He made his directorial debut with the comedy thriller Foul Play (1978), which was nominated for several accolades including the Golden Globe Award for Best Motion Picture – Musical or Comedy. He subsequently directed 9 to 5 (1980) and The Best Little Whorehouse in Texas (1982), both starring Dolly Parton.

Higgins was diagnosed with HIV in 1985, and subsequently founded a charitable foundation to supporting gay and transgender youth. He died of AIDS-related illness in 1988, at the age of 47.

== Early life and education ==
Higgins was born in Nouméa, in the French overseas territory of New Caledonia, to an Australian mother, Joy (Kelly), and American father, John Edward Higgins, one of six sons. His brother is Australian actor John Higgins.

Higgins' father enlisted in the army following the attack on Pearl Harbor, and his mother returned to her home in Sydney with Colin and his elder brother. Apart from a brief stint in San Francisco in 1945, Higgins lived in Sydney until 1957, mostly in the suburb of Hunters Hill, attending school at Saint Ignatius' College, Riverview.

After moving to Redwood City, California, Higgins attended Stanford University for a year, but then lost his scholarship because he became "obsessed" with theatre. He moved to New York and hung around the Actors Studio, but could not find work, so he became a page at the ABC television studios. He lost hope about becoming an actor, enlisted in the U.S. Army, and was sent to Germany, where he worked for Stars and Stripes newspaper.

Higgins was discharged in 1965, spent six months in Europe, mostly in Paris, then returned to Stanford University to study for a Bachelor of Arts in Creative Writing. Higgins later said, "after I had traveled and worked for a while I was anxious to study for the sake of studying. I took courses for what they were, not so that I could sleep in."

While at college Higgins supported himself as an actor, playing in small theatre productions, including acting in a sex farce called Once Over Nightly for a year and a half. He wrote a play, Once Around the Quad, which was performed at Stanford after he left.

== Career ==
=== Early work ===
After Higgins graduated from Stanford he got a job as an able-bodied seaman "because I wanted to see the Orient. It didn't take me long to realize that the days of Conrad and Eugene O'Neill were over. There was no work and too many people to do it."

He visited Expo 67 in Montreal, was inspired by the film exhibits there and decided to learn about film. He began working for a Master of Fine Arts in screenwriting at UCLA, where his classmates included Paul Schrader and his own brother Barry Higgins. While Colin Higgins was there, he made the short films Opus One (1968), a satire on student films, and Retreat, an anti-war statement. His thesis was the basis for Harold and Maude (1971).

=== Harold and Maude ===
After graduating he went to work for a wealthy family in Los Angeles as a part-time chauffeur and pool cleaner in exchange for free accommodation. He met a film producer, Ed Lewis, and showed him a draft of Harold and Maude. Lewis then showed it to Robert Evans at Paramount. Higgins wanted to direct the script himself and was allowed to shoot a director's test for $7,000, but Paramount was not sufficiently impressed, and Hal Ashby was hired. Higgins collaborated well with Ashby and both were pleased with the final film, but it was not a large box-office success on original release.

Higgins got an offer to write the screenplay for the TV movie The Devil's Daughter (1972), which he later described as "just a job". He also wrote a script for a TV movie, The Distributor, which was not made, and a feature film script, Killing Lydia, which became the basis for his 1978 film Foul Play. He then received an offer from Jean-Louis Barrault in Paris to turn Harold and Maude into a play for French actor Madeleine Renaud. Higgins did so, working on the French translation with Jean-Claude Carrière, and the play ran for seven years. The film of Harold and Maude continued to run in cinemas around the world, and by 1983 it was in profit. (The same year it was estimated that Higgins had earned $1 million from his script and productions of the play.)

While he was in Paris, Higgins met theatre director Peter Brook and worked with him as playwright-in-residence for his company. They did a play about mountain people in Uganda called The Ik which ran in Paris, London and New York. The producers of The Devil's Daughter hired Higgins to write a Hitchcock-style thriller. This script became Silver Streak (1976), which was a hit under the direction of Arthur Hiller. Higgins later said if he had directed it he would have been "a bit less faithful to the writer; I would have slashed away."

=== Director ===
The success of Silver Streak enabled Higgins to revive his earlier script Foul Play (1978) and direct the film himself. It was enormously popular at the box office and launched his directing career.

He was writing the comedy-thriller The Man Who Lost Tuesday when he received an offer to re-write and direct 9 to 5 (1980). It was a big hit, as was the musical The Best Little Whorehouse in Texas (1982), which Higgins directed.

He was meant to follow it with The Man Who Lost Tuesday, but Paramount felt the budget was too high and passed.

In 1985, he was working on a project with playwright Jonathan Reynolds. In 1986, he was reportedly writing the script Washington Girls as a vehicle to reunite Jane Fonda, Lily Tomlin and Dolly Parton.

His last credit was the TV movie Out on a Limb (1987), which he co-wrote and co-produced.

== Death and legacy ==
Higgins, who was openly gay, died of an AIDS-related illness at his home on 5 August 1988 at the age of 47. The Colin Higgins Foundation was established in 1986 to provide support for gay and transgender youth. It was established by Higgins following his diagnosis with HIV in 1985.

== Filmography ==
=== Film ===
Year	Title	Functioned as			Notes
Year	Title	Director	Writer	Producer	Notes
1971	Harold and Maude	No	Yes	Yes	
1976	Silver Streak	No	Yes	No	
1978	Foul Play	Yes	Yes	No	
1980	9 to 5	Yes	Yes	No	
1982	The Best Little Whorehouse in Texas	Yes	Yes	No	

==== Acting roles ====
Year	Title	Role	Notes
1985	Into the Night	Actor in hostage film	Cameo appearance

=== Television ===
Year	Title	Director	Writer	Producer	Notes
1973	The Devil's Daughter	No	Yes	No	TV movie
1987	Out on a Limb	No	Yes	Yes	Miniseries

== Unproduced screenplays ==
- The Man Who Lost Tuesday – a comedy thriller set in Paris
- First Lady – a satire on politics to star Lily Tomlin

== Theatre ==
- Harold and Maude (1972)
- The Ik (1975)

== Awards and nominations ==
Award	Year	Category	Work	Result
Edgar Awards	1979	Best Motion Picture Screenplay	Foul Play	Nominated
Golden Globe Awards	1979	Best Screenplay	Foul Play	Nominated
Primetime Emmy Awards	1987	Outstanding Limited Series	Out on a Limb	Nominated
Writers Guild of America Awards	1977	Best Written Comedy	Silver Streak	Nominated
Writers Guild of America Awards	1981	Best Written Comedy	9 to 5	Nominated
