= The Queen's Book of the Red Cross =

1939 World War II fundraising book

- Author: Various
- Publisher: British Red Cross
- Publication date: 1939

The Queen's Book of the Red Cross was published in November 1939 in a fundraising effort to aid the Red Cross during World War II. Sponsored by Queen Elizabeth, its contents were contributed by fifty British authors and artists. The contents included stories, poems, and illustrations.

== List of authors and artists ==
=== Authors ===
- A. E. W. Mason, "The Conjurer", a story
- Hugh Walpole, "The Church in the Snow", a story
- John Masefield, "Red Cross", a poem
- Ian Hay, "The Man Who Had Something Against Him"
- Charles Morgan, "Creative Imagination", an essay
- D. L. Murray, "Only a Sojer!", a story
- T. S. Eliot, "The Marching Song of the Pollicle Dogs", a poem
- T. S. Eliot, "Billy M'Caw: The Remarkable Parrot", a poem
- H. M. Tomlinson, "Ports of Call", a story
- A. A. Milne, "The General Takes Off His Helmet", a play
- Cecil Roberts, "Down Ferry Lane"
- E. M. Delafield, "The Provincial Lady in War-time", a story
- Cedric Hardwicke, "One Man in His Time Plays Many Parts"
- Daphne du Maurier, "The Escort", a story
- Ann Bridge, "Looking Back on May the Sixth, 1935"
- Jan Struther, "Mrs. Miniver Makes a List", a story
- Eric Ambler, "The Army of Shadows", a story
- Howard Marshall, "The Fisherman's England"
- Humfrey Jordan, "The Boatswain Yawned", a story
- Alfred Noyes, "A Child's Gallop", a poem
- Alfred Noyes, "The Stranger", a poem
- O. Douglas, "Such an Odd War!", a story
- Howard Spring, "Christmas Honeymoon", a story
- Dorothy Whipple, "No Robbery", a story
- Lord Mottistone, "Tell Them, Warrior"
- L. A. G. Strong, "A Gift from Christy Keogh", a story
- Walter de la Mare, "And So To Bed", a poem
- Walter de la Mare, "Joy", a poem
- Denis Mackail, "It's the Thought That Counts", a story
- Gracie Fields, "On Getting Better"
- C. H. Middleton, "Keep That Garden Going"
- Georgette Heyer, "Pursuit", a story
- Edith Evans, "The Patriotism of Shakespeare", an essay
- H. C. Bailey, "The Thistle Down", a story
- C. Day-Lewis, "Orpheus and Eurydice", a translation from Virgil's "Georgics"
- Ruby Ferguson, "Mrs. Memmary's Visitors", a story
- J. B. Morton, "A Love Song"
- Frank Smythe, "The Crag"
- Mary Thomas, "Our Knitting Forces"
- Collie Knox, "This Flag Still Flies over All Mankind", homage to the Red Cross

=== Artists ===
- Cecil Beaton, a photograph of the Queen
- William Russell Flint, The Words of His Majesty the King, a picture
- Edmund Dulac, a picture
- Frank Brangwyn, a picture
- J. Morton Sale, The Red Cross of Comfort, a picture
- Edmund Blampied, The Symbol, a picture
- Dame Laura Knight, Hop Pickers, a picture
- Bip Pares, a picture
- Arthur Wragg, a picture
- Norman Wilkinson, a picture
- Rex Whistler, In the Wilderness, a picture
- Mabel Lucie Attwell, a picture
- Ivor Novello, We'll Remember, a manuscript of a war song

== Bibliographic information ==
Elizabeth, Queen consort of George VI, King of Great Britain; T S Eliot; John Masefield; British Red Cross Society; Knights of Malta (1939). The Queen's book of the Red Cross: with a message from Her Majesty the Queen and contributions by fifty British authors and artists: in aid of the Lord Mayor of London's fund for the Red Cross and the Order of St. John of Jerusalem. London: Hodder and Stoughton. OCLC 1011946
