= Gilbert Cannan =

British novelist and dramatist

Gilbert Eric Cannan (25 June 1884 – 30 June 1955) was a British novelist and dramatist. He was the author of the semi-autobiographical series Lawrie Saga. He was a pacifist opposed to the First World War.

== Early life ==
Born in Manchester of Scottish descent, he got on badly with his family, and in 1897 he was sent to live in Oxford with the economist Edwin Cannan. He was educated at Manchester Grammar School and King's College, Cambridge; he started on a legal career, but turned to writing in 1908, after a short spell as an actor.

== Career ==
Cannan worked first as a translator and as a reviewer in London publications. Many of his novels are in part autobiographical and fit into a novel sequence the Lawrie Saga, around the character Stephen Lawrie. Samuel Butler was a major influence on his fiction. In 1914, the novelist Henry James in an article in The Times named Cannan as one of four significant up-and-coming authors, alongside D. H. Lawrence, Compton Mackenzie and Hugh Walpole.

He was employed as a secretary by J. M. Barrie, working with him in their efforts against censorship of the theatre by the Lord Chamberlain. A relationship developed in 1909 between Cannan and Barrie's wife Mary Ansell, a former actress who felt neglected in her marriage. Cannan had been wooing Kathleen Bruce, who at the same time was receiving advances from the explorer Robert Falcon Scott. When Bruce decided to marry Scott, Mary Barrie's sympathy for Cannan developed a momentum of its own. Her husband sought to be reconciled, but relented and divorced her in a high-profile case, and she and Cannan were married in 1910. Cannan was caricatured as Mr. Gunn, a minor character in George Bernard Shaw's 1911 drama Fanny's First Play.

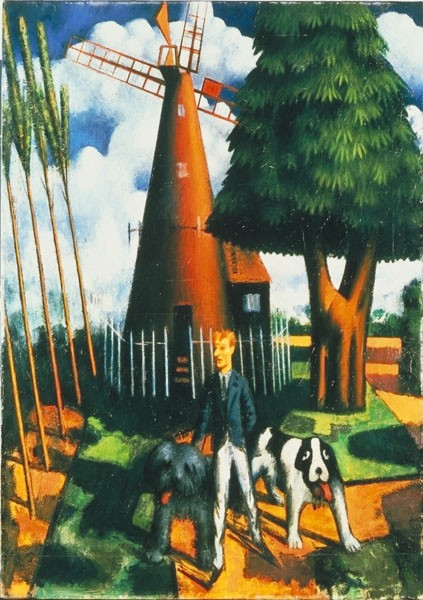
Gilbert Cannan at his Mill by Mark Gertler

During World War I he was a pacifist and then conscientious objector, and was involved in the National Council Against Conscription. He used his experiences in later novels, making the character Melian Stokes in Pugs and Peacocks a portrait of Bertrand Russell. He had known Ottoline Morrell from before the war. During it he moved in her circle, introducing her to D. H. Lawrence, and knew also Dora Carrington, Dorothy Brett and the artist Mark Gertler. Cannan's book Mendel was based on Gertler's early life (Mendel being his Yiddish given name), and explored his relationships with C. R. W. Nevinson and Carrington. Gertler painted Gilbert Cannan and his Mill; the picture is now in the Ashmolean Museum. The mill was at Cholesbury in Buckinghamshire, where Cannan was living in 1916, and which attracted a number of his intellectual circle (including Lawrence and his wife Frieda, and Katherine Mansfield and John Middleton Murry). The picture also shows the Cannans' two Newfoundland dogs, Sammy on the left and Luath, who was also Barrie's dog before his divorce from Mary Ansell and the inspiration for Nana, the Darling children's nurse in Peter Pan. In 1916, partly in response to the devastating effects of the war and the threat of conscription, Cannan suffered a mental breakdown, an experience which he vividly described in his book, The Release of the Soul.

His marriage ended in 1918 when he had an affair with Gwen Wilson who later married Henry Mond in 1920 while Cannan was lecturing in the United States. Unconventionally, Cannan lived with Wilson and her new husband in a ménage à trois in their home, Mulberry House, in Smith Square, Westminster. A hint of their relationship is suggested in Cannan's dedication of Letters from a Distance "to Gwen, without whose courage, tenderness and force there would have been no author to write these letters."

After the war Cannan devoted himself to writing, translation work and travel but another mental breakdown in 1923 proved untreatable. He became a mental patient at the Priory Hospital, Roehampton. He then spent the rest of his life confined to Holloway Sanatorium near Virginia Water where he died of cancer on 30 June 1955.

== Family ==
The poet May Wedderburn Cannan and her sister, the writer Joanna Cannan, were cousins of his, daughters of the academic Charles Cannan (Dean of Trinity College, Oxford, and Secretary to the Delegates of Oxford University Press); as was Professor Edwin Cannan, the noted LSE economist (and brother of Charles Cannan); Joanna's daughter Diana Pullein-Thompson was his biographer. Joanna Cannan's son, Denis Cannan was also a dramatist.

== Works ==
- Jean-Christophe by Romain Rolland (1910–1913) translator
- Peter Homunculus (1909) first novel
- Heinrich Heine's Memoirs, edited by Gustav Karpeles (1910) translator
- Devious Ways (1910) novel
- Little Brother (1912) novel
- The Joy of the Theatre (1913) essays
- Four Plays (1913)
- Round The Corner (1913) novel
- Love (1914)
- Old Mole (1914) novel
- Old Mole's Novel (1914) novel
- Satire (1914)
- Young Earnest – The Romance of a Bad Start in Life (1915)
- Samuel Butler: A Critical Study (1915)
- Windmills: A Book of Fables (1915) fantasy
- The Right to Kill (1915) play
- Adventurous Love and Other Verses (1916)
- Three Pretty Men (1916) novel (Published in the US as Three Sons and a Mother)
- Mendel: a story of youth (1916) novel, closely based on Mark Gertler's early life
- Everybody's Husband (1917) play, performed at the Birmingham Repertory Theatre with incidental music by Maurice Besly
- The House with the Mezzanine, and Other Stories by Anton Chekhov (1917) translator with S. S. Koteliansky
- The Stucco House (1917) novel
- Freedom (1917) (Essays, Non Fiction)
- The Anatomy of Society (1919) (Essays, Non Fiction)
- Time and Eternity (1919)
- Pink roses (1919) novel
- My Life (1920)
- The Release of the Soul (1920) (Essays, Non Fiction)
- Pugs and Peacocks (1921)
- Sembal (1922)
- Annette and Bennety (1922)
- Noel – An Epic in Seven Cantos (1922)
- Seven Plays (1923)
- Letters From a Distance (1923) (letters reprinted from the New York Freeman.)
- House of Prophecy (1924)
- Diary of A. O. Barnabooth by Valery Larbaud, translator

== Sources ==
- Diana, Farr (1978). Gilbert Cannan: a Georgian prodigy. London: Chatto and Windus. ISBN 9780701122454 – via Internet Archive.
- Haycock, David Boyd (2009). A Crisis of Brilliance: Five Young British Artists and the Great War. London, Old Street Publishing. ISBN 978-1-905847-84-6.
