= Victoria Clayton =

British writer

- Born: Victoria Walker; 1947 (age 78–79)
- Education: University of Cambridge
- Occupation: Author
- Children: 2
- Writing career
- Language: English
- Genres: Children's fantasy, adult fiction
- Notable work: The Winter of Enchantment

Victoria Clayton, née Walker, (born 1947) is a British author. She began writing at her parents' house in Cambridgeshire (after a couple of years living a bohemian lifestyle in London). When dining one night in London she sat next to Bill McCreadle of publisher Rupert Hart-Davis who agreed to look at her manuscript, and in 1969, when she was just 21, he decided to publish what became The Winter of Enchantment. Its sequel, The House Called Hadlows, was published in 1972. The books concern a boy called Sebastian who enters another world through a magic mirror. He meets a girl called Melissa who has been imprisoned by an evil Enchanter and resolves to rescue her. In the second book Sebastian and Melissa release a house from a curse made by the Evil One.

After spending four years living in rural Wales and the Isle of Skye, Clayton went to the University of Cambridge to study English. After graduation she married and spent many years living in the country and bringing up her children. In 1997, she returned to writing books: Out of Love was her first adult's book. Past Mischief (1998), Dance with me (1999), Running Wild (2000), Clouds Among the Stars (2003), Moonshine (2004), A Girl's Guide to Kissing Frogs (2007) and Stormy Weather (2011), followed.

Both of Victoria's children's books - "The Winter of Enchantment" and "The House Called Hadlows" - were reissued by Fidra Books. The Winter of Enchantment reissued in 2007, is still in print as of 2026 from Purple House Press.

She is married and has two children.

== Bibliography ==
- Clayton, V. (2006). Introduction to "The Winter of Enchantment". Edinburgh: Fidra Books.
