= Misery Me =

Australian 1959 television film

- Newspaper ad, 15 Jul 1959
- Based on: play by Denis Cannan
- Directed by: Alan Burke
- Country of origin: Australia
- Original language: English

Production
- Running time: 60 mins

Original release
- Network: ABC
- Release: 15 July 1959 (Sydney, live)
- Release: 5 August 1959 (Melbourne)

Misery Me is a 1959 Australian television movie, or rather a live television play, which aired on ABC. It was a satirical comedy written by British playwright Denis Cannan and had originally been a stage play.

At the time, most TV plays presented on Australian television were adaptations of overseas stage plays. It is likely that the experience gained from these productions allowed ABC to later produce dramatic programs with more local interest, such as Stormy Petrel.

The program was originally shown in Sydney (on ABN-2) on 15 July 1959. A kinescope ("telerecording") was made of the program and later shown in Melbourne on 5 August 1959 (on ABV-2). In 1959, two additional ABC stations began operations, in Adelaide and Brisbane respectively, and it is not known of the program was also shown in these two cities.

The archival status of the program is not known.

== Plot ==
A young couple make a suicide pact at a mountain resort. Matters are complicated by the arrival of two former suitors of the girl, Cornelia.

== Cast ==
- Diana Davidson as Cornelia
- Gordon Glenwright as Carlo Bambas
- Lionel Stevens as Julius Ring
- Barbara Eather
- John Huson
- Don Pascoe
- Hugh Stewart

== Production ==
The play had been performed in 1955 and adapted for TV on the BBC in 1955.

== Reception ==
According to director Alan Burke the play received "tiny ratings" like many ABC plays around this time.

The critic from the Sydney Morning Herald wrote that the "oddly uneven ingredients of political satire and romantic farce" that featured in the play "were not mixed with enough smoothness" to make the TV adaptation "entirely satisfying" adding that the play suffered from being reduced to an hour ("hardly gave the players or the ideas time to properly ferment"). However he did think there that "when attractive acting was combined with flexible production" there were "some charming and amusing individual scenes."

== See also ==
- Blue Murder
- Black Limelight
- Bodgie
- List of live television plays broadcast on Australian Broadcasting Corporation (1950s)
