= Gillian Baxter =

British writer of children's books (1938–2025)

Gillian Baxter (1938 – 22 March 2025) was a British writer of children's books. Her books were mainly pony books about horses, although one book, The Knightsgate Players, was about acting. Baxter also wrote under her married name "Gillian Hirst". Baxter died on 22 March 2025, at the age of 87.

== Bibliography ==
- Horses and Heather (1956)
- Jump to the Stars (1957)
- Tan and Tarmac (1958)
- The Difficult Summer (1959)
- Ribbons and Rings (1960)
- The Stables at Hampton (1961)
- Horses in the Glen (1962)
- The Perfect Horse (1963)
- The Knightsgate Players [non-pony] (1964)
- The Team from Low Moor (1965)
- Special Delivery (1967)
- Pantomime Ponies (1969)
- Save the Ponies! (1971)
- Ponies by the Sea (1974)
- Ponies in Harness (1977)
- Ponies to the Rescue (1983)
- Bargain Horses (1992)

The books Pantomime Ponies, Save The Ponies and Ponies in Harness were later combined into one volume, simply entitled My Book of Pony Stories.

== Sources ==
- Abebooks (in regard to My Book of Pony Stories)
- https://www.facebook.com/share/p/1BnzbCoY9v/
