= Bevil Quiller-Couch =

British Army officer and letter writer

Major Bevil Bryan Quiller-Couch MC (12 October 1890 – 6 February 1919) was a decorated British Army officer who served continuously in Flanders and France from August 1914 to 1918. He was the son of the Cornish writer, Sir Arthur Quiller-Couch of Fowey, Cornwall. He was engaged to the war poet, May Wedderburn Cannan, but he died before they could be married. A book of his letters was published in 2002. The book was also made into a radio play by the BBC.

== Education ==
Born at Fowey, he attended Trinity College, Oxford in 1908 where he was captain of his College VIII rowing crew. He won the University Pairs in 1912 and 1913. He also rowed in the final for the Goblets at the Henley Royal Regatta. While he was at Oxford, he joined the Officer Training Corps and joined the Special Reserve.

== War service ==
His war service started in August 1914 where he served with the Royal Field Artillery at Mons and Aisne. He was involved in the transportation of ammunition to the gun batteries. He saw action at the First Battle of Ypres. He later saw action at Festubert and in May 1915 he was the Orderly Officer responsible for writing the regimental war diary. By 1916, he was on the Somme and in August that year he was promoted to acting major. In September 1917, he was wounded during the Third Battle of Ypres. He was later involved at Cambrai and, by January 1918, went on leave back to England. Towards the end of the war, Quiller-Couch led his battery into action at Noyelles. He last saw action in November 1918 before joining the reserve forces at Villers Pol.

== Citation ==
Lieutenant Bevil Brian Quiller-Couch RFA (SR). Exceptional ability and energy during the time he was with the Brigade Ammunition Column on the Aisne and in Flanders from 20th September to 16th December 1914. On many occasions he showed great courage and initiative in bringing up his wagons. Since December in the Bethune district he acted as Orderly Officer until appointed Adjutant 10th June 1915. He has shown great zeal and ability. During the recent active operations at Festubert and Le Plantin in May his services were particularly valuable. It was a great deal owing to his energy and grasp of the situation that everything worked successfully and smoothly. This particularly applied to the tactical control of the French Group and arrangements made in connection with this Group generally.

— The London Gazette, No. 31370, 30 May 1919

== Death ==
Quiller-Couch survived the war only to die at Langerwehe, near Düren in Germany, on 6 February 1919 during the Spanish flu pandemic. Although he died after the end of the war, his name is recorded on the war memorial at Fowey Church.

== Legacy ==
A book by Charlotte Pullein-Thompson called The Tears of War was published in 2000 by Cavalier Books. It is a compilation of Quiller-Couch's love letters sent to his fiancée and poems she sent to him. In 2002, BBC Radio 4 presented a dramatised version of The Tears of War as the afternoon play on Armistice Day. The part of Quiller-Couch was played by the actor James Purefoy.
