= The Ik =

1975 play by Colin Higgins and Denis Cannan

- Original language: English
- Written by: Colin Higgins; Denis Cannan

Premiere
- Date: 1975
- Place: Paris

The Ik is a 1975 play by Colin Higgins and Denis Cannan adapted from the 1972 book by Colin Turnbull about the Ik people titled The Mountain People.

It was devised with director Peter Brook.
