= Dennis Farr =

British art historian and curator (1929–2006)

Dennis Larry Ashwell Farr CBE (2 April 1929 – 6 December 2006) was a British art historian and curator. Through his writings and the exhibitions he organised in his positions as director of City Museums and Art Gallery in Birmingham (1969–1980) and subsequently as director of the Courtauld Institute Galleries (1980–93), Farr established a reputation as a champion of 20th century British art.

== Education ==
Dennis Farr was educated at Luton Grammar School and studied for his BA at the Courtauld Institute of Art, London University, from 1947 to 1950. Anthony Blunt, director of the Courtauld at the time, steered him towards doing his MA dissertation on the nineteenth-century painter William Etty. He was awarded an MA by the Courtauld in 1956.

== Career ==
It was at the Courtauld too that Farr began his career, as assistant Witt Librarian from 1952 to 1954, before moving to the Tate Gallery as assistant keeper, where he remained until 1964. There then followed short stints as curator at the Paul Mellon Collection, Washington DC from 1965 to 1966, and then senior lecturer in fine art and deputy keeper of the University Art Collections, Glasgow University, from 1967 until 1969.

In 1969 he became director of Birmingham City Museums and Art Gallery, where he remained until 1980. It was a period during which the gallery was said to enjoy a "golden period" marked by major acquisitions including works by Bellini and Canaletto.

He returned to his alma mater in 1980 to take up the post of Director of the Courtauld Institute Galleries, where he remained until his retirement in 1993. One of his initial tasks was to integrate the recently acquired Princes Gate Collection, mainly of Flemish and Italian paintings and drawings, into the Courtauld's wider collection. He subsequently oversaw the transfer of the Courtauld's collection from Woburn Square to rather grander galleries at Somerset House, which opened to the public in 1990.

During his career, Farr also served as president of the Museums Association (1979–80) and chairman of the Association of Art Historians (1983–86). He was general editor of Clarendon Studies in the History of Art from 1985 to 2001.

== Awards and honours ==
The University of Birmingham awarded Farr an honorary doctorate in 1981 in recognition of his work in the city.

He was made a Commander of the Order of the British Empire (CBE) in 1991.

== Later life ==
On his retirement from the Courtauld in 1993, Farr moved to Haslemere in Surrey with his wife, the children's book author Diana Farr (previously known as Diana Pullein-Thompson), the better to be able to pursue his leisure-time passion of horse riding. He continued to write and to work as a guest curator of exhibitions. He died in Guildford on 6 December 2006.

=== Other information ===
Photographs contributed by Farr to the Conway Library are currently being digitised by the Courtauld Institute of Art, as part of the Courtauld Connects project.

== Selected works ==
William Etty (1958), Routledge & Kegan Paul

(With Chamot, Mary and Butlin, Martin) Catalogue of the Modern British School Collection (1964), Oldbourne Press, London (2 volumes)

British Sculpture Since 1945 (1965), Tate, London

English Art, 1870-1940 (1978), Oxford University Press

(With Eva Chadwick) Lynn Chadwick, sculptor: with a complete illustrated catalogue, 1947-2003 (1991), Clarendon Press, Oxford

Farr published an autobiographical article "in response to a suggestion from the Editor" in The Burlington Magazine in 2005, titled "A student at the Courtauld Institute".
