= Elinor Lyon =

English children's writer (1921–2008)

Elinor Bruce Lyon (17 August 1921 – 28 May 2008) was an English children's author from a Scottish family background. Several of her novels are set on the Highland coast, others in Wales. They have been seen to feature "strong girls and sensitive boys and shared leadership between the sexes".

== Background ==
Lyon was born in Guisborough, Yorkshire. She was educated privately and then at St George's School, Edinburgh and Headington School, Oxford (1934–1938). She was strongly aware of her Scottish roots.

Elinor Lyon's father was the poet and headmaster P. H. B. Lyon. After a period in Switzerland, she returned to Oxford to read English at Lady Margaret Hall, just as the Second World War began. She completed four terms, then joined the WRNS: "With many... friends being killed, I couldn't stay there reading Milton." She served for 2 1/2 years as a radar operator.

Elinor was the inspiration for many of John Gillespie Magee, Jr.'s poems. Magee had met her while attending Rugby School, and he remained close friends with her and her family until his death in December 1941.

Her father served as headmaster of Rugby School from 1931 to 1948. Elinor met her future husband Peter Wright there, when he was a temporary Classics and English teacher, and became engaged to him in 1943. He returned to teaching when he was demobbed in 1946, and although Lyon's father had retired, they remained at Rugby until 1975, when they in turn retired to Harlech, Gwynedd.

Lyon's fondness for Scotland, the scene of many of her books, dated back to a holiday spent there in her own childhood. Holidays with her children were frequently spent there too, often in remote houses without running water or electricity.

Elinor Lyon died at Harlech on 28 May 2008, her husband having died of a stroke twelve years earlier. She was survived by two sons, two daughters and twelve grandchildren.

== Books ==
Between 1948 and 1976 Lyon wrote over 20 books for children. These had some success on both sides of the Atlantic. She found they "came much more easily" than writing for adults and believed her inspiration arose from "omnivorous reading".

Lyon began The House in Hiding, for example, after reading Arthur Ransome's Swallows and Amazons, because she disliked the characters in it (they were too good at everything). In response, the children in The House in Hiding get things wrong, but still manage to succeed eventually. The change was pinpointed in an obituary by Julia Eccleshare: "Lyon's adventures, with their strong girls and sensitive boys and shared leadership between the sexes, were firmly within the Arthur Ransome tradition, yet felt more modern, more thoughtful about how children's behaviour is affected by what they experience, especially the way they are treated by adults. Within the adventures, her intention was to show the themes that she felt children cared about: justice, freedom and compassion." The main characters, Ian and Sovra (pronounced with a long "o", from sóbhrach, meaning "primrose" in Gaelic), are the son and daughter of a local doctor. They appear in a series of stories recognisably set in the Ardnish Peninsula – specifically Arisaig and Mallaig.

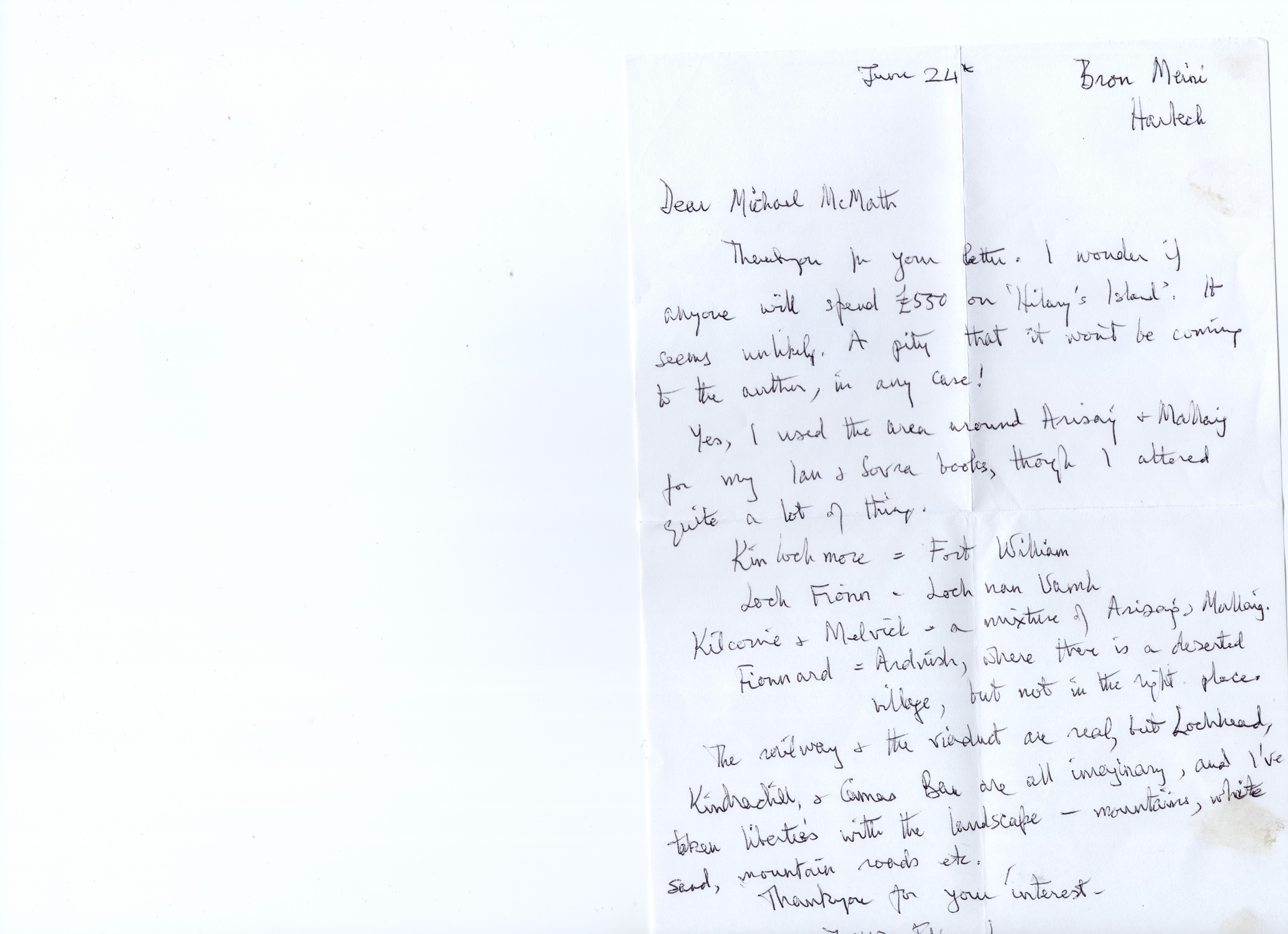
Elinor Lyon's 2005 letter

From a 24 June 2005 letter from Elinor Lyon:
I used the area round Arisaig and Mallaig for my Ian and Sovra books, though I altered quite a lot of things.
Kinlochmore = Fort William
Loch Fionn = Loch Nan Uamh
Kilcorrie and Melvick = a mixture of Arisaig and Mallaig.
Fionnard = Ardnish where there is a deserted village, but not in the right place.
The railway and the viaduct are real, but Loch-head, Kindrachill and Camas Ban are all imaginary, and I've taken liberties with the landscape – mountains, white sand mountain roads etc.

As the children explain to a new friend in We Daren't Go A'Hunting, "Stay with us and you won't be bored. You may be seasick or ship-wrecked or drowned or lost or burned or killed by falling over a cliff, but you won't be bored." The third in the series, Run Away Home, is a darker story of an orphan, Cathie, on a reckless search for her past. As with the bossy town girl Ann in the first two books, Cathie is at once a focus and a foil for the doings of the bold and humane Ian and Sovra. In Cathie Runs Wild, No. 5 in the series, she becomes the central character, ably supported by Ian and Sovra, but deeply uncertain of herself as a fostered child, despite clear ideas of what and where she wants to be. Determination to show that girls can be as resourceful and adventurous as boys pervades Lyon's books, not excluding the first, Hilary's Island (1948).

Among the literary admirers of Lyon's books was Walter de la Mare. He stated in a dust-jacket endorsement of Wishing Water Gate that "a deal of close thinking must have gone into its bright-vivid and complex plot and its lively English; I enjoyed every page." More recently, she was named by the US children's writer Lizzie K. Foley as a favourite author. However, Lyon as a children's novelist escaped almost all critical attention during her 30-year writing career. As one later scholar remarked, "Elinor Lyon, whose series of novels about Ian and Sovra – set in the Scottish Highlands – have something of the character of William Mayne's early fiction, is not mentioned in any of the standard works." Still, the dust jacket of a 1967 US edition of Echo Valley quotes The Times Literary Supplement in calling her "a writer to remember and look for".

Lyon ceased to write in 1975, but reprints of several titles appeared in the 1980s, and four were reissued from 2006 onwards by an Edinburgh publisher, Fidra Books.

== Bibliography ==
- Island Adventures (c. 1939, unpublished)
- Hilary's Island (1948)
- Wishing Water-Gate (1949)
- The House in Hiding (1950, Ian and Sovra No. 1)
- We Daren't Go A'Hunting (1951, Ian and Sovra No. 2)
- Run Away Home (1953, Ian and Sovra No. 3)
- Sea Treasure (1955)
- Dragon Castle (1956)
- The Golden Shore (1957)
- Daughters of Aradale (1957, Ian and Sovra No. 4)
- Rider's Rock (1958)
- Cathie Runs Wild (1960, Ian and Sovra No. 5)
- Carver's Journey (1962, US: The Secret of Hermit's Bay, Ian and Sovra No. 6)
- Green Grow the Rushes (1964)
- Echo Valley (1965)
- The Dream Hunters (1966, Ian and Sovra No. 7)
- Strangers at the Door (1967, Ian and Sovra No. 8)
- The Day That Got Lost (1968)
- The Wishing Pool (1970)
- The King of Grey Corrie (1975, Ian and Sovra No. 9, about their children)
- The Floodmakers (1976, Ian and Sovra No. 10, about their children)
- Hugh Lyon – A Memoir (with Barbara Lyon, 1993)
- The Shores of Darkness (2009)?

Elinor Lyon's publisher until 1962 and also for The Day That Got Lost was Hodder & Stoughton; subsequent books came from another Hodder imprint, the Brockhampton Press. Several US editions were published in the 1960s by Follett of Chicago. The biography of her father was privately published by Laurence Vinney. Some of her books were reissued in the 2000s by Fidra Books; three were available in the final months of 2020. Some titles were translated into German, Spanish, Italian, Swedish and Danish. FictFact is the source for the order of the Ian and Sovra titles.
