= Muriel Wace =

British writer

Muriel Alice Wace (née Maude; 5 April 1881 – 12 November 1968) was an English children's book author known by the pseudonym Golden Gorse. Her works, which include The Young Rider: Ponies for Health and Pleasure (1928) and the novel Moorland Mousie (1929), develop the genre of pony books and promote the British native Exmoor pony.

== Personal life ==
Muriel Maude was born on 5 April 1881 in Mortlake, Surrey. Her father, Ashley Henry Maude, a civil servant, was the son of Colonel Sir George Ashley Maude, crown equerry to Queen Victoria. Her mother, Emma Constance (née Henry), died when Muriel was a young child. She had four older sisters, including Dorothea Maude, a doctor and surgeon. Muriel was largely educated at home, but spent a short spell at Cheltenham Ladies' College in 1894–95. Part of her childhood was spent at Eastbourne in Sussex.

As a young adult Muriel lived in Oxford, at first with her sister Dorothea. On 20 November 1911, she married the Reverend Henry Charles Wace (1867–1938), an academic at Brasenose College, Oxford. The couple did not have children. After the First World War, the Waces settled at Paradise Farm in Crowcombe, Somerset. In later life, Muriel Wace removed to Ireland, living at Sandbank Farm, Snave, near Bantry in County Cork, until her death on 12 November 1968. Wace carefully maintained her anonymity, and did not allow her publishers to disseminate any biographical information about her. Her biographical details remained unknown until ten years after her death.

Wace's experience with ponies started in her childhood. Her father, himself a skilled equestrian, gave his daughters an untrained Welsh pony, which the children learned to break in. As a young adult in Oxford, Wace rode astride (as opposed to sidesaddle), unusually for ladies of the time, and enjoyed hunting. After moving to Somerset, she encountered Exmoor ponies, which figured in many of her books.

== Writings ==
Her first novel was the popular Moorland Mousie (1929) (illustrated by Lionel Edwards), the story of an Exmoor Pony, believed to be strongly influenced by Anna Sewell's Black Beauty. Moorland Mousie was told from the viewpoint of the Exmoor pony. It is sometimes regarded as the first pony story, and was groundbreaking in its focus on a native British breed, as well as the shift to recreational uses for horses.

Wace wrote four fictional pony books in total, in addition to highly regarded instruction manuals. Her nonfiction works include The Young Rider: Ponies for Health and Pleasure (1928), which promotes the idea of children, and girls in particular, learning to ride and care for ponies. The book emphasises riding astride (not side-saddle) for female equestrians of all ages.

== Bibliography ==
- The Young Rider: Ponies for Health and Pleasure (non-fiction) (1928)
- Moorland Mousie (1929)
- Older Mousie (1932)
- The Young Rider’s Picture Book (non-fiction) (1936)
- Janet and Felicity, The Young Horsebreakers (1937)
- Mary in the Country (1955) (illustrated by E. H. Shepard)
