= Joanna Cannan =

English children's writer and novelist (1896–1961)

- Born: 27 May 1896; Oxford, England
- Died: 22 April 1961 (aged 64); Blandford Forum, Dorset, England
- Resting place: Fairmile cemetery, Henley-on-Thames
- Occupation: Author
- Spouse: Harold Pullein-Thompson
- Children: Denis Cannan; Josephine, Diana and Christine Pullein-Thompson
- Parents: Charles Cannan; Mary Wedderburn
- Relatives: May Cannan, sister; Charlotte Popescu, granddaughter; Edwin Cannan, uncle

Joanna Maxwell Cannan (27 May 1896 – 22 April 1961) was an English writer of pony books and detective novels, the former aimed mainly at children. She belonged to a family of prolific writers.

== Life ==
Herself the youngest daughter of Charles Cannan, the Dean of Trinity College, Oxford, and secretary to the Delegates of Oxford University Press, and Mary Wedderburn, also a cousin of Gilbert Cannan, it is perhaps for her children that Joanna Cannan is best known. She was mother to Josephine, Diana and Christine Pullein-Thompson and Denis Cannan. She was one of three daughters. One sister was the poet May Cannan. She was also grandmother to Charlotte Popescu.

Joanna Cannan was born and brought up in Oxford, but had a fondness for Scotland, which was the destination for many family holidays and part of her maternal heritage. Her ancestors participated in some of the seminal events in Scottish history, such as the Jacobite rising and Battle of Culloden. The wilds of Roshven in the West Highlands must have seen a dramatic and romantic location in comparison to sedate Oxford, especially as the Cannan children were apparently "provided with an unrelenting diet of boys' adventure stories."

During World War 1 she became a VAD nurse, as did her Oxford friend Carola Oman, who was to become a children's author and biographer. Georgette Heyer was another friend there. It was during Cannan's nursing duties in Oxford that she met her future husband, Captain Harold J "Cappy" Pullein-Thompson, whom she married in 1918.

On her marriage she became Joanna Cannan Pullein-Thompson, but she continued to publish as Joanna Cannan. Her husband had been badly injured during the war and she was the main earner in the family, producing a book every year until she died. After their marriage, the couple moved to Wimbledon. Disapproving of traditional education, she encouraged her daughters to write and to be self-reliant. However she did impose a variety of strict house rules including, "Don't talk horses at meals." This was hard for her daughters to keep.

Cannan was diagnosed with tuberculosis in 1951. She died of heart failure in 1961 at the Blandford Cottage Hospital at Blandford Forum in Dorset. She is buried at Fairmile cemetery, Henley-on-Thames.

== Books ==
Most of Cannan's pony books were published before or during World War II. After the war she began to experiment with detective novels, because she felt that the world she had used to write about was beginning to disappear. In the early 1950s her health began to decline: she was eventually diagnosed with tuberculosis. She died in 1961, four years after her husband.

A painting and some photographs of Joanna Cannan belong to the National Portrait Gallery in London.

As well as the books listed, she also contributed to magazines during her lifetime.

== Bibliography ==
=== Pony novels for children ===
- A Pony for Jean (1936)
- We Met Our Cousins (1937). Republished by Fidra Books in 2006 with a twenty-page biography of the author by her daughter Josephine.
- Another Pony for Jean (1938)
- London Pride (1939). Republished by Fidra Books
- More Ponies for Jean (1943)
- They Bought Her A Pony (1944)
- Hamish: The Story of a Shetland Pony (1944)
- I Wrote A Pony Book (1950)
- Gaze at the Moon (1957)
- The Vanguard Book of Ponies and Riding (1966). Co-writer

=== Novels and collections ===
- The Tripled Crown. (A book of English, Scotch and Irish verse for the age of six to sixteen) (co-author) (1908)
- The Misty Valley (1922)
- Wild Berry Wine (1925)
- The Lady Of the Heights (1926)
- Sheila Both Ways (1928)
- The Simple Pass On (1929)
- Ashes of Roses. Serialised, Daily Courier (1929)
- No Walls of Jasper (1930)
- Orphan of Mars (1930)
- The Hour of the Angel: Ithuriel's Hour (1931)
- High Table (1931), a satirical book about Oxford University
- Snow in Harvest (1932)
- North Wall (1933)
- Under Proof (1934)
- The Hills Sleep On (1935)
- A Hand to Burn (1936)
- Frightened Angels (1936)
- Princes in the Land (1936) (republished by Persephone Books, 2006)
- Pray Do Not Venture (1937)
- They Rang Up the Police (1939)
- Idle Apprentice (1940)
- Death at The Dog (1940)
- Blind Messenger (1941)
- Little I Understood (1948)
- Murder Included (republished as A Taste of Murder and in the United States as Poisonous Relations) (1950)
- And All I learned (1951)
- Body in the Beck (1952)
- Long Shadows (1955)
- People to be Found (1956)
- And Be a Villain (1958)
- All is Discovered (1962)

=== Short stories ===
- "Prodigal Son", Britannia and Eve, 1 March 1936
- "Cleverness Isn't Everything", Britannia and Eve, 1 March 1939
- "Love is of the Valley". Britannia and Eve, 1 April 1939

=== Non-fiction ===
- Oxfordshire (1952)
