= Ruby Ferguson =

English fiction and children's writer (1899–1966)

Ruby Constance Annie Ashby Ferguson
- Born: Ruby Constance Annie Ashby; 28 July 1899; Hebden Bridge, West Yorkshire, England
- Died: 11 November 1966 (aged 67)
- Other names: R. C. Ashby, Ruby Ferguson
- Occupation: Novelist
- Notable work: Lady Rose and Mrs. Memmary
- Spouse: Samuel Ferguson

Ruby Constance Annie Ferguson, née Ashby (28 July 1899 – 11 November 1966), was an English writer of popular fiction, including children's literature, romances and mysteries as R. C. Ashby and Ruby Ferguson. She is best known today for her novel Lady Rose and Mrs. Memmary and her Jill books, a series of Pullein-Thompsonesque pony books for children and young adults.

== Life and career ==
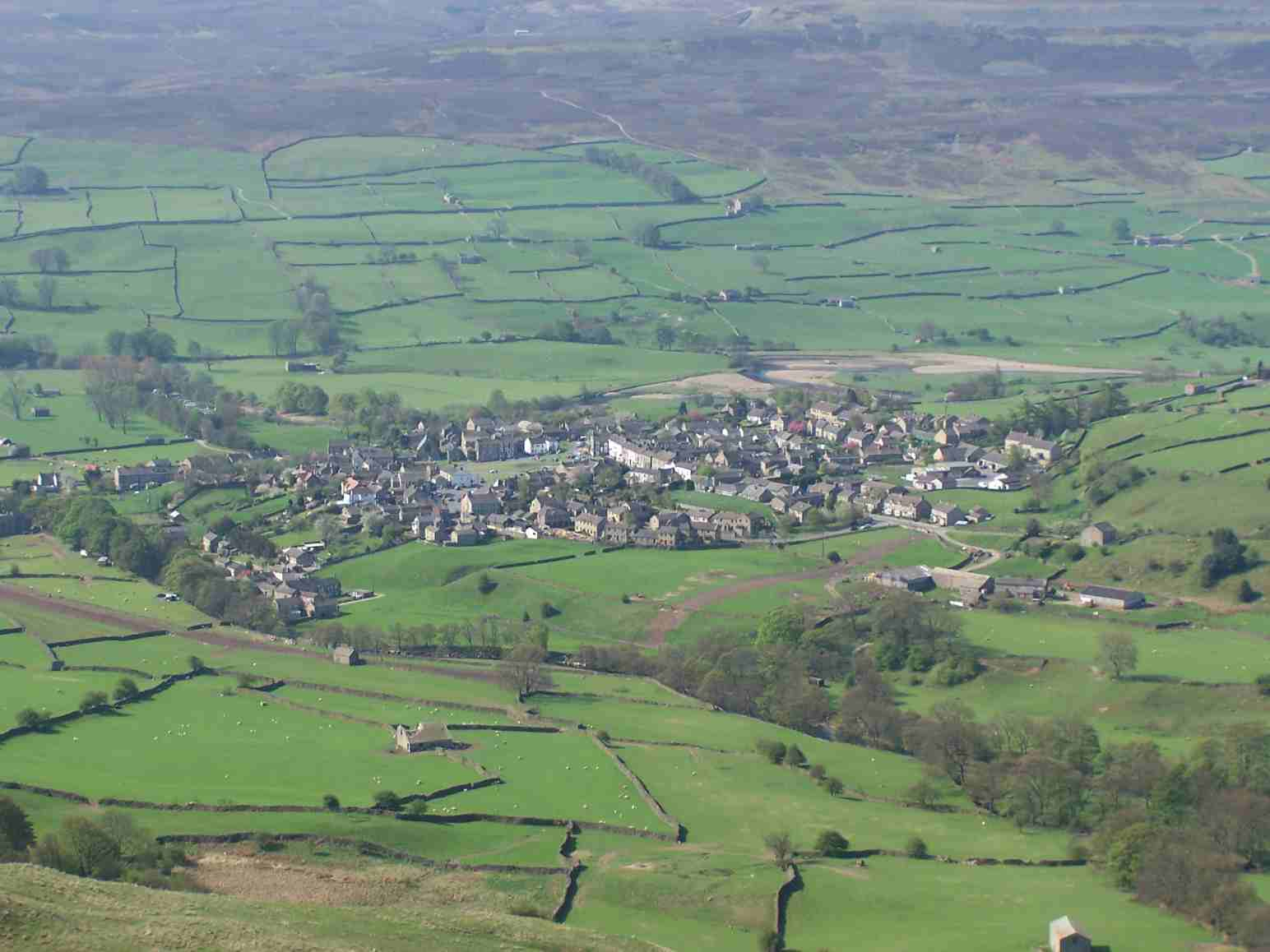
Reeth, North Yorkshire, Ferguson's hometown

Ruby Constance Annie Ashby was born in Hebden Bridge and raised in Reeth, North Yorkshire. Her parents were Ann Elizabeth, (born Spencer) and the Reverend David Ashby, a Wesleyan minister. Ferguson later became a lay officer of the Methodist church. She received her education at Bradford Girls Grammar School and then at St Hilda's College at the University of Oxford, where she read English from 1919 to 1922, gaining a 3rd class BA and, a few years later, the Oxford MA.

She then moved to Manchester and took a job as a secretary, supplementing her income by writing a regular column for the British Weekly. She reviewed books for the publisher Hodder and Stoughton. Her writing career began in earnest when she submitted some detective stories for a weekly competition in the Manchester Evening News. Her first full-length novel, The Moorland Man, appeared in 1926 published by Hodder and Stoughton. She continued writing novels and stories under the name "R.C. Ashby" until the mid-1930s.

In 1929 she assisted the Liberal party candidate William C. Mallison at the West Derbyshire constituency.

On 1 March 1934, she married Samuel Ferguson, a widower and electrical engineer with two sons at the Water Lane Methodist Church, in Wilmslow. Three years later, she published Lady Rose and Mrs. Memmary as Ruby Ferguson, a romantic novel that became her greatest success, which was republished in 2004 by Persephone Books. After its original publication, The Queen Mother is reported to have enjoyed the book so much that she invited Ruby Ferguson to dinner at Buckingham Palace.

Between 1949 and 1962 she gained great popularity with the "Jill" books for her step-grandchildren, Libs, Sallie, and Pip. Her last book in 1967, Children at the Shop, is a fictionalised memoir of her childhood.

== The Jill books ==
The Jill books are a series of nine children's novels about young equestrienne Jill Crewe and her adventures with her two ponies, Black Boy and Rapide. The series takes the protagonist from the age of twelve to fifteen, from a pony novice to a prize-winning rider.

In the first book in the series, Jill's Gymkhana, Jill's father has recently died, and she moves with her mother to a small Pool Cottage near the fictional village of Chatton. Her mother hopes to support them both as a children's author. Jill is at first a social outcast in "horsy" Chatton because she doesn't own a pony and can't ride. When her mother's stories finally begin to sell for £52, however, the first thing she buys is "Black Boy" pony for £12 for her daughter. With hard work and the expert assistance of Martin Lowe, a wheelchair-using former Royal Air Force pilot, Jill becomes a star of Chatton equitation.

Jill is grateful for her mother's success; however, as she says repeatedly throughout the series, she "can't get on" with her mother's books at all, finding them impossibly sweet and whimsical. Jill is an active, independent and witty character who defies post-war expectations for English girls by scorning ladylike pursuits, treating boys her own age as equals, and working hard to achieve her goals. This makes Ferguson's writing outstanding not only in the pony stories genre, but in children's literature generally.

== List of works ==
=== As R.C. Ashby ===
==== Single works ====
- The Moorland Man (1926)
- The Tale of Rowan Christie (1927)
- Beauty Bewitched (1928)
- Death on Tiptoe (1931)
- Miss Graham's Guest ("The Methodist", No. 90, June 1932)
- Plot Against a Widow (1932)
- He Arrived at Dusk (1933)
- One Way Traffic (1933)
- Out Went the Taper (1934)

=== As Ruby Ferguson ===
==== Single works ====
- Lady Rose and Mrs Memmary (1937) (Republished in 2004 by Persephone Books)
- The Moment of Truth (1944)
- Our Dreaming Done (1946)
- Winter's Grace (1948)
- Turn Again Home (1951)
- Apricot Sky (1952)
- A Paintbox for Pauline (1953)
- The Leopard's Coast (1954)
- For Every Favour (1956)
- Doves in My Fig-tree (1957)
- The Cousins of Colonel Ivy (1959)
- The Wakeful Guest (1962)
- A Woman With a Secret (1965)
- Children at the Shop: The Charming Autobiography of Childhood (1967)
- The Queen's Book of the Red Cross. With a message from Her Majesty the Queen and contributions by fifty British authors and artists. In aid of the Lord Mayor of London's Fund for the Red Cross and the Order of St. John of Jerusalem (1939) (contributor)

==== The Jill series ====
- Jill's Gymkhana—sometimes sold with A Stable for Jill. (1949)
- A Stable for Jill (1951)
- Jill has Two Ponies (1952)
- Jill Enjoys her Ponies (1954) (later republished as Jill and the Runaway)
- Jill's Riding Club (1956)
- Rosettes for Jill (1957)
- Jill and the Perfect Pony (1959)
- Pony Jobs for Jill (1960) (later republished as Challenges for Jill)
- Jill's Pony Trek (1962)
