= William Fawcett (author) =

English writer (1902–1941)

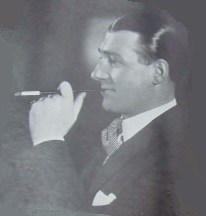
Fawcett in 1931

William Claude Fawcett (1902 – 18 May 1941) was an English journalist, editor, broadcaster, and prolific author on fox hunting, horse racing, and equestrianism.

He died in 1941 while serving in the Royal Army Service Corps.

== Early life ==
Fawcett was only son of Sir William Claude Fawcett (1868–1935), a solicitor, of the Grange, Stainton, North Yorkshire, by his marriage in 1901 to Adeline, the daughter of Frederick Henry Brentnall, the village schoolmaster at Stainton. He began his hunting career at the age of two-and-a-half with the Cleveland Hunt. He had two younger sisters, Rosalie Molyneux Fawcett, born in 1907 and Elizabeth Joyce Fawcett born 1913 He was educated at Aysgarth and at Uppingham School.

Through his grandfather, William Rhodes Fawcett, the young Fawcett was a descendant of Henry Clifford, 1st Earl of Cumberland KG (1493–1542), of John Clifford, 9th Baron de Clifford, a Lancastrian leader of the Wars of the Roses, and through Lady Elizabeth Percy of Sir Harry Hotspur, Mary of Lancaster, and King Henry III.

== Career ==
After service as a Second Lieutenant in the 4th Battalion the Green Howards, into which he was commissioned in 1921, Fawcett wrote a series of articles on racing for the Newcastle Chronicle and thus became a journalist. His first book, Hunting in Northumbria, appeared in 1927. In 1928, he succeeded Charles Richardson as hunting and racing editor of The Field, becoming the youngest holder of that position since the magazine was founded in 1853.

For the evening of the International Horse Show of 1934, Fawcett produced an equestrian event with special lighting effects called "The Moonlight Steeplechase", based on the engravings of Henry Alken. The first scene depicted was at the Royal Artillery officers' mess at Ipswich in 1831, and after a challenge to a steeplechase had been accepted nightshirts and nightcaps were decided upon as the correct wear. The Times noted that this part of the show was "rollicking fun, as well as good horsemanship".

Fawcett left The Field in 1936 to concentrate on writing books on fox hunting, racing and horses. In 1938–1939, he was Editor and Secretary of the United Services Association, then became Editor of the Hunts Association, which published many of his books.

Fawcett hunted with the Zetland, the Hurworth, and the Cleveland, and claimed to have ridden to hounds at least once with nearly every pack of foxhounds in England, Scotland and Ireland. He bred hunters, and owned and trained steeplechasers at Croft Spa, North Yorkshire, as well as being a pioneer of Greyhound racing in England. He broadcast a series of talks on the greyhound on BBC Radio.

During the Second World War, Fawcett rejoined the British Army and with effect from 19 August 1940 was commissioned as a Second Lieutenant into the Royal Army Service Corps. He died on 18 May 1941. At the time of his death his address was given in Who's Who as 20 Brampton Grove, Hendon, NW4. Probate was granted to his brother-in-law, Stanley Vernon Dickins, as executor of the Will.

Fawcett's father had died in 1935, but he was survived by his mother, Lady Fawcett, who was appointed a Member of the Order of the British Empire in 1941 and was still living in 1968.

== Selected publications ==
- Hunting in Northumbria: the history of the Haydon Hunt and many other packs (Witherby, 1927)
- Saddle Room Sayings (Constable, 1931)
- Elements of Horsemanship (1932)
- Turf, Chase and Paddock (Hutchinson, 1932)
- The Cattistock Hunt (1933)
- The Holderness Hunt (1933)
- The Tynedale and Haydon Hunts (1933)
- The Devon and Somerset Staghounds (Hunts Association, 1933)
- The Cambridgeshire Hunt (Hunts Association, 1934)
- Thoroughbred and Hunter: Their Breeding, Training & Management from Foalhood to Maturity, illus. Lionel Edwards (Eyre and Spottiswoode, 1934)
- The East Sussex Hunt and the Romney Marsh and Rother Valley Harriers (1935)
- The Monmouthshire Hunt (1935)
- The Pytchley Hounds
- The Old Berkeley Hunt
- The Duke of Beaufort's Hunt (Hunts Association, 1936)
- Fox Hunting (1936; new ed. by Kessinger Publishing, 2010, ISBN 1-163-14373-1, ISBN 978-1-163-14373-5)
- Hunting England: a survey of the sport, and of its chief grounds, with Sir William Beach Thomas (1936)
- The Albrighton and Albrighton Woodland Hunts (1937)
- The Newmarket & Thurlow and Suffolk Hunts (1938)
- The Wye Valley Otterhounds and the North Herefordshire and South Herefordshire Hunts (Hunts Association, 1938)
- Punter's Pie (1938)
- Riding and Horsemanship (The Sportsman's Library)
- Horses and Ponies
- The Young Horseman (1940)
- Riding Schools
- Sporting Spectacle
- Racing in the Olden Days
- Sporting Days in Tynedaleland
- In St Wilfrid's City
- A Romance of Transport
- Star: the Story of a Foal
