= Dorothea Maude =

British physician (1879–1959)

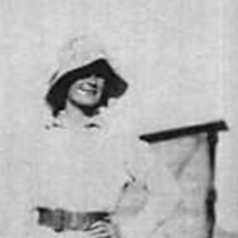
- in 1916
- Born: 26 February 1879; South Kensington
- Died: 12 December 1959 (aged 80)
- Other name: Dorothea Nasmyth
- Education: Somerville College, Oxford
- Occupation: Physician
- Known for: volunteering as a doctor in Belgium, France and Corfu
- Spouse: Hugh Nasmyth
- Children: 2

Dorothea Maude or Dorothea Clara Nasmyth (26 February 1879 – 12 December 1959) was a British physician. She had a private practice in Oxford but left this three times to serve at hospitals in Belgium, France, Serbia and Corfu during the First World War. She was first woman general practitioner in Oxford.

== Education and early life ==
Maude was born in South Kensington in 1879. She was the middle girl of five daughters of Emma Constance (born Henry) and Ashley Henry Maude. Her youngest sister was the children's author Muriel Wace. Her mother died when she was ten and she was educated well at Cheltenham Ladies College. She finished there in 1897 and Maude went up to Somerville College to come top of her class in science, but was denied an Oxford degree because she was a woman. She went on to study at London’s Royal Free Hospital School of Medicine for Women. She also gained a masters degree in Dublin (where women were allowed to have degrees). She then gained an MBBS from the University of London in 1906 and finally an M.D.

== First World War ==
The war broke out in 1914 and at the end of that year she was in Belgium. In January 1915, she was in France, later at the first Maude Hospital run by her uncle and before the summer she was back in England.

In July 1915, she took her third trip, this time to Serbia where she volunteered. She was given charge of an of typhoid hospital in October 1916 60 miles north of Salonika in Vodena. This would be her last hospital.

The Maude hospital moved to Salonika in September 1916. The new hospital was disease ridden. Maude had to take quinine to allow her to recover from the malaria that suffered in the first month there. She returned to Britain on 30 April 1917.

Maude had a great deal of affection for Serbia and their people. She said that anyone who visited there would remember it and have to return.

== Private life ==
She married G. C. H. (Hugh) Nasmyth in 1909 and they had two children. She died at Abingdon near Oxford at the age of 80 on 12 December 1959. Her autobiography is in the Wellcome Library.
