= Patricia Leitch =

Scottish writer

Patricia Leitch (13 July 1933 – 28 July 2015), was a Scottish writer, best known for her series of children's books in the pony story genre about Jinny Manders and her wild, traumatised Arabian horse Shantih, set in the Scottish Highlands. Leitch was born in Paisley, Renfrewshire, Scotland.

The 12 books in the Jinny series were published between 1976 and 1988 by Armada. They were latterly reprinted by Catnip Publishers. Another two of her novels, Dream of Fair Horses (1975) and The Horse from Black Loch (1963) have been republished by Jane Badger Books. She also wrote under the pseudonym Jane Eliot.

The Jinny series books often contain this brief biographical information:

"Patricia Leitch started riding when a friend persuaded her to go on a pony trekking holiday - and by the following summer she had her own Highland pony, Kirsty. She wrote her first book shortly after this and writing is now her full-time occupation, but she has also done all sorts of different jobs, including being a riding-school instructor, groom, teacher and librarian. She lives in Renfrewshire, Scotland, with a bearded collie called Meg."

Leitch was a vegan. Animal welfare and vegetarianism are strong themes in her books. Celtic, Arabic and Buddhist mythology and philosophy are also frequently referred to.

The Jinny series marks a significant departure from the traditional 'tweedy' horse and pony stories aimed at middle-class children. Jinny is a scruffy, willful, tom-boyish girl who does not have any social or romantic aspirations. Serious social justice issues are raised throughout the series, forcing Jinny to confront her own prejudices and character faults.

Underlying the series is a sense of predestination deriving from Celtic mythology. Jinny is portrayed as a gifted or chosen child with special and dangerous tasks to perform, guided by mysterious and sometimes frightening characters such as the Red Horse (agent of the Celtic Horse Goddess Epona) and the Walker. In this way, it resembles a sequence from The Dark Is Rising by Susan Cooper.

== Bibliography ==
The Jinny series:

- 1. For Love of a Horse (1976)
- 2. A Devil to Ride (1976)
- 3. The Summer Riders (1977)
- 4. Night of the Red Horse (1978)
- 5. Gallop to the Hills (1979)
- 6. Horse in a Million (1980)
- 7. The Magic Pony (1982)
- 8. Ride Like the Wind (1984)
- 9. Chestnut Gold (1984)
- 10. Jump for the Moon (1985)
- 11. Horse of Fire (1986)
- 12. Running Wild (1988)

Some other works by Patricia Leitch:

- A Pony Of Our Own (Blackie & Son 1960; Knight Books 1971)
- The Horse From Black Loch - also known as Black Loch (William Collins 1963 Hardback; Fonatana 1979 Paperback)
- Last Summer To Ride (1963)
- A Rosette For Royal (Blackie 1963)
- Janet Young Rider (1963)
- Riding Course Summer (1963)
- Highland Pony Trek (Collins 1964)
- Treasure To The East (Gollancz 1966)
- Rebel Pony (Collins 1973)
- First Pony (Collins 1973)
- Jump To The Top (1973)
- Pony Surprise (1974)
- Dream Of Fair Horses, aka Fields Of Praise (William Collins 1975)
- Windows: Poems (New Leaves Press 1978)
- The Adventures of Robin Hood (Armada 1979) ISBN 0006914314/9780006914310

The Kestrels/Horseshoes Series:

- 1. The Special Pony (1992)/The Perfect Horse (1996)
- 2. A Pony To Jump (1992)/Jumping Lessons (1992)
- 3. Cross-Country Gallop (1993)
- 4. Pony Club Rider (1993)
- 5. The Stolen Pony (1993)/Show Jumper Wanted (1995)
- 6. The Pony Puzzle (1994)/The Mystery Horse (1997)
