= Rosica Colin =

Romanian literary agent

Rosica Colin (10 October 1902 – 25 April 1983) was a Romanian literary agent of the mid twentieth century who was principally known for her promotion of works in translation. Using her language skills and international outlook, she represented French writers in England and English writers in Europe. The firm she founded still exists as Rosica Colin Ltd.

== Early life ==
Rosica Colin was born in Romania around 1903.

== Career ==
In 1939, Colin travelled to England after spending time in Germany. She worked for Basil Blackwell in Oxford during the Second World War and subsequently for the Romanian department of the BBC and the Belgian Government Economic Mission.

Colin set up as a literary agent in London. She gave Diana Pullein-Thompson her first job. A skilled linguist, Colin was principally known for her promotion of works in translation. Among the authors she represented were Jean-Paul Sartre, Simone de Beauvoir, Jean Genet, Eugène Ionesco, Heinrich Böll, and Albert Camus. An astute judge of quality with a Catholic taste, Colin soon found herself representing authors writing in English as diverse as the "angry young man" Alan Sillitoe (who she helped early in his career), the writer of westerns J.T. Edson, and the playwrights Howard Sackler and Howard Brenton.

Colin represented Enid Blyton in Europe and persuaded French and German publishers to take Blyton on in translation, resulting in huge sales.

== Death ==
Colin died at her home in London on 25 April 1983. The firm she founded still exists as Rosica Colin Ltd.
