= Lionel Edwards =

British artist (1878–1966)

- Born: Lionel Dalhouise Robertson Edwards; 9 November 1878; Clifton, Bristol
- Died: 13 April 1966 (aged 87); Salisbury
- Known for: Painting, Illustration, Equine Artist

Lionel Edwards (9 November 1878 – 13 April 1966) was a British artist who specialised in painting horses and other aspects of British country life. He is best known for his hunting scenes but also painted pictures of horse racing, shooting and fishing. He provided illustrations for Country Life, The Sphere, The Graphic and numerous books.

== Biography ==
The son of a doctor, Edwards grew up at Benarth, a small estate in Conway, North Wales. His father, from whom he acquired his love of fox hunting, died when he was seven. From an early age, he showed a talent for drawing horses, an artistic trait which may have come from his maternal grandmother, who was a pupil of George Romney. It seemed he was heading for an Army career until it became apparent that his talents did not lie in that direction, so his mother allowed him to study art in London, first with A.S. Cope and later at the Heatherley School of Fine Art and Frank Calderon's School of Animal Painting. He became the youngest member of the London Sketch Club at the age of nineteen. In 1905, he married Ethel Wells and the couple moved out of London to Radley, in Oxfordshire, and later to Worcestershire, before moving back to Benarth. They both were enthusiastic fox hunters: during his life, Edwards hunted with almost every pack in the country.

On the outbreak of the Great War, he volunteered as a Remount Purchasing Officer along with his contemporaries, Cecil Aldin and Sir Alfred Munnings. On being demobilised, he and his family moved to West Tytherley, near Salisbury, where he lived for the rest of his life.

His artistic output was remarkable: he wrote almost 30 books and illustrated many more, including editions of Black Beauty, Lorna Doone and The Black Arrow, in addition to numerous private commissions. He became a member of the Royal Cambrian Academy of Art in 1926 and the Royal Institute in 1927. His favorite medium was watercolours, although he used oils more in his later years. His work was also part of the art competitions at the 1928 Summer Olympics, the 1932 Summer Olympics, and the 1948 Summer Olympics.

He worked to the end of his life, dying from a stroke at his home on 13 April 1966.

== Publications ==
=== As author/illustrator ===
- Hunting Countries (1925)
- The Passing Seasons (1927)
- Hunting and Stalking Deer (1927) - with H.F. Wallace
- My Hunting Sketchbook: Vol 1 (1928)
- Huntsmen Past & Present (1929)
- My Scottish Sketchbook (1929)
- My Hunting Sketchbook: Vol 2 (1930)
- The Wiles of the Fox (1932)
- Famous Foxhunters (1932)
- Sketches in Stable and Kennel (1933)
- A Leicestershire Sketchbook (1935)
- Hunting Problems (1936)
- A Sportsman's Bag (1938)
- Seen from the Saddle (1937)
- Horses and Ponies (1938)
- My Irish Sketch Book (1938)
- The Lighter Side of Sport (1940)
- Scarlet and Corduroy (1941)
- Our Food from Farm to Table (1943)
- Our Horses (1945)
- Reminiscences of a Sporting Artist (1947)
- My First Horse (1947)
- Our Cattle (1948)
- Getting to Know Your Pony (1948)
- The Fox (1949)
- Beasts of the Chase (1950)
- Thy Servant the Horse (1952)
- Sportsman's Sketchbook (1953)
- Whitbread Dog Calendar (1966) - with Peter Biegel

=== As illustrator ===
- Tower, Charles (1913) The Moselle
- Ogilvie, Will H. (1922) Galloping Shoes: Hunting and polo poems
- Ogilvie, Will H. (1923) Scattered scarlet
- Ogilvie, Will H. (1925) Over The Grass
- 'Golden Gorse' (Muriel Wace)(1929) Moorland Mousie
- 'Golden Gorse' (Muriel Wace)(1932) Older Mousie
- Fawcett, William (1934) Thoroughbred and Hunter
- Lyle, Robert (1934) Brown Jack
- Street, A.G (1936) Moonraking
- Flint, Mark (1938) Grig the Greyhound
- Winstone, Daphne (1945) Flame
- Sewell, Anna (1946) Black Beauty
- Morris, Pamela Macgregor (1947) Topper
- Herald, Kathleen (K.M. Peyton)(1949) The Mandrake
- Curling, B.W.R. (1951) British Racecourses
- Blackmore, R.D. (1954) Lorna Doone
