= Peter Clover =

English children's book author and illustrator

- Born: 9 June 1952 (age 74); Islington, North London
- Occupations: Writer, Illustrator
- Notable work: Sheltie the Shetland Pony series
- Website: peterclover.co.uk

Peter Clover (b. Islington, North London, 9 June 1952) is an English children's book author and illustrator best known for the Sheltie the Shetland Pony series, featuring a young girl, Emma, and her shaggy Shetland pony. In addition Peter Clover has created four other short series: Rescue Riders, Hercules, Donkey Diaries, and Little Bridge Farm, along with numerous standalone titles. The Tale of Blackeye Jax is a ghost story about a phantom highwayman, published by Barrington Stoke who specialise in books for reluctant readers. Dead Cool and Dead Cooler are humorous ghost stories also published by Barrington. His inspiration for the Sheltie pony books camefrom when he used to live on Exmoor in Devon. Peter said, "I wanted to spend my time doing the two things I enjoyed most – writing and creating pictures. Illustrated adventure stories for kids seemed like a brilliant idea and I just love it. Being able to create an entire village like Little Applewood and bringing all the characters to life gave me such a buzz." He is also known for his contemporary abstract paintings and has exhibited in both London and his current home of Mallorca. The Attack of the Killer Frogs is his latest children's horror story, published by A & C Black. With over 70 titles in print throughout UK, USA, France and Germany his latest books are the re-telling of classic tales with ten beautifully illustrated titles including Treasure Island, Robin Hood, Gulliver's Travels, Wind in the Willows, Wizard of Oz, Swan Lake, Rumpelstiltskin and others.

www.peterclover.co.uk

== Works ==
- Drawing Horses and Ponies, Hamlyn Children's (London, England), 1994
- The Best Pony for Me!, Macdonald (Hemel Hempsted, England), 1995
- The Phantom Pony, Corgi (London, England), 1999
- The Storm Pony, Corgie (London, England), 2000
- Dead Cool, Barrington, Stoke (Edinburgh, Scotland), 2003
- Dead Cooler, Barrington Stoke, 2007
- The Tale of Black-Eye Jax, Barrington Stoke, 2009
- Tam O'Shanter, Illustrations only, Barrington Stoke 2009
- Fearless, illustrations only, Barrington Stoke, 2009
- The Best Pony For Me, illustrations only, Macdonald Young Books
- The Attack of the Killer Frogs, A & C Black, 2012

=== Sheltie the Shetland Pony ===
The Sheltie the Shetland Pony books were published by Puffin Books in the UK. The first seven were also published by Aladdin Paperbacks in the US.

- Sheltie the Shetland Pony, UK: 1996, US: 2000
- Sheltie Saves the Day!, UK: 1996, US: 2000
- Sheltie and the Runaway, UK: 1996, US: 2000
- Sheltie Finds a Friend, UK: 1996, US: 2000
- Sheltie in Danger, UK: 1997, US: 2001
- Sheltie to the Rescue, UK: 1997, US: 2000
- Sheltie Rides to Win, UK: 1998, US: 2001
- Sheltie in Trouble, 1998
- Sheltie and the Saddle Mystery, 1998
- Sheltie Leads the Way, 1998
- Sheltie the Hero, 1998
- Sheltie on Parade, 1999
- Sheltie and the Stray, 1998
- Sheltie the Snow Pony, 1999
- The Big Adventure, 1999
- Sheltie on Patrol, 1999
- Sheltie Goes to School, 1999
- Sheltie Gallops Ahead, 1999
- The Big Show, 1999
- Sheltie: The Big Surprise, 1999
- Sheltie in Double Trouble, 1999
- Sheltie Forever, 1999
- The Big Present, 1999
- Sheltie in Peril, 2000
- Sheltie and the Foal, 2000
- Sheltie: The Big Wish, 2000
- Sheltie by the Sea, 2000
- Sheltie Races On, 2000
- Sheltie at the Funfair, 2001

=== Rescue Riders ===
The Rescue Riders books were published by Hodder & Stoughton in 1998.

- Race against Time
- Fire Alert
- Ghost Pony

=== Hercules ===
The Hercules books were published by Hodder & Stoughton in 2000.

- New Pup on the Block
- Operation Snowsearch
- Treasure Hound

=== Donkey Diaries ===
The Donkey Diaries books were published by Oxford University Press.

- Donkey Danger, 2001
- Donkey Disaster, 2001
- Donkey Drama, 2001
- Donkey in Distress, 2002

=== Little Bridge Farm ===
The Little Bridge Farm books were published by Scholastic Corporation in 2007.

- Oscars New Friends
- Smudge Finds The Trail
- Tiger's Great Adventure
- Dilly Saves The Day
- Socks Cleans Up

=== Classic Stories ===
The Classic Stories books were published by Starry Forest Books in 2020.

- Robin Hood
- Treasure Island
- The Adventures of Tom Sawyer
- Rumpelstiltskin
- Twelve Dancing Princesses
- The Frog Prince
- Swan Lake
- Gulliver's Travels
- Wizard of Oz
- Wind in the Willows
