= Pony book =

Genre in children's literature

Pony books, pony stories or pony fiction form a genre in children's literature of stories featuring children, teenagers, ponies and horses, and the learning of equestrian skills, especially at a pony club or riding school.

== Development of genre ==
The 1877 novel Black Beauty, although about a horse and not a pony, is seen as a forerunner of pony book fiction.

Pony books themselves began to appear in the late 1920s. In 1928 British lifestyle magazine Country Life published Golden Gorse's The Young Rider which went to a second edition in 1931, and a third in 1935. In the preface to the third edition, the author wrote: "Since then the outlook on children and their ponies has changed very much for the better." She also noted an increase in equestrian pastimes: "Five children seem to be learning to ride today for one who was learning seven years ago." Many pony books today encourage the young rider to look at life from their pony's perspective, including the Connemara Pony Adventures and the Saddlestone Connemara Pony Listening School series by Irish author, Elaine Heney.

== Critical commentary ==
The pony book genre is "frequently deemed idealistic," "cater[ing] for those typical fantasies of perfect friendship with an idealized companion."

A critic noted in 1996 that the genre had "been relegated firmly to the sidelines".

A 2009 article posed whether readers of pony-series fiction could do more than simply get another book in the series, much as a young collector of My Little Pony toys would be compelled to add to their collection. The article noted an alternative view of the value of pony fiction; it introduces young readers to wider literature.

== Authors of pony books ==
- Enid Bagnold
- Kitty Barne
- Gillian Baxter
- Judith M. Berrisford
- Jeanne Betancourt
- Bonnie Bryant
- Joanna Cannan
- Joanna Campbell
- Peter Clover
- Primrose Cumming
- Walter Farley
- Ruby Ferguson
- Mary Gervaise
- Golden Gorse
- Marguerite Henry
- Katharine Hull and Pamela Whitlock
- Will James
- Patricia Leitch
- Jenny Oldfield
- K. M. Peyton
- Christine Pullein-Thompson
- Diana Pullein-Thompson
- Josephine Pullein-Thompson
- Stacy Gregg
- Allen W. Seaby
- Pat Smythe
- Mary Treadgold
