= Once Over Nightly =

Sex comedy play

- Written by: John Michael O'Hare
- Original language: English
- Genre: Sex comedy

Premiere
- Date premiered: 1967

Once Over Nightly was a sex comedy play which ran between 1967 and 1969 in San Francisco. The plot thickens when a public relations man finds his picture in the newspaper with a curvaceous model wearing only his account's product.
