= Christine Pullein-Thompson =

British horsewoman and writer (1925–2005)

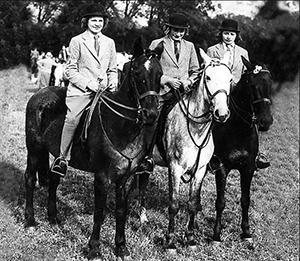
- Three sisters (elder sister Josephine on the left), c. 1942
- Born: 1 October 1925; Wimbledon, London, England
- Died: 2 December 2005 (aged 80); Norwich, England
- Other name: Christine Keir
- Occupation: writer
- Known for: books about ponies
- Spouse: Julian Popescu
- Children: Philip, Charlotte Popescu, Mark and Lucy
- Relatives: Diana Pullein-Thompson (twin) Josephine Pullein-Thompson (sister)

Christine Pullein-Thompson, later Christine Popescu and a nom de plume of Christine Keir (1 October 1925 – 2 December 2005) was a British horsewoman and writer known for her pony books. Her mother, her two sisters and her daughter also wrote pony books; together they created more than 200 books for children – and Christine wrote more than 100 of them.

== Life ==
Pullein-Thompson was born in Wimbledon. Her father, Harold Pullein-Thompson, had the Military Cross and her mother, Joanna Cannan, was an author credited with starting the idea of pony books in 1936. She was the second of twins. They had an elder sister and an elder brother. Denis would adopt his mother's name and become an actor and successful comedy playwright under the name Denis Cannan. All the sisters would be writers.

The family home was a villa in the suburb of Wimbledon. Her father was badly wounded in the war and in frequent pain with related bad temper. He had earned the Military Cross. He had just survived when many of his fellows had been killed. He had been a teacher but he then sold fridges and had a game company, but it was her mother who made more money writing pony books on the kitchen table.

The family moved to Rotherfield Peppard in Oxfordshire, where their large house, The Grove, had its own stables. Christine could ride at age seven and she her sisters would compete in events. In time they would describe their country childhood in their joint autobiography Fair Girls and Grey Horses (2014). The life that they led as children became the subject of many of their books. The girls had an unusual education, as distinct from their brother who went to Eton College; their mother taught them at home.

When she and her twin were 14 years old and her sister was 15, they abandoned education and started a riding school at their home. The riding school brought in extra money as the three sisters taught others to ride.

In 1946, she had a share in her first book It Began With Picotee, which the three sisters had created together in 1941. Her sisters each published a book of their own the same year, but Christine's first solo book, We Rode to the Sea, was not published until 1948.

Diana and Christine intended to be professional horse riders in America. Christine went to start work in Virginia, but Diana was denied entry to the USA in 1952, as the medical revealed that she had tuberculosis. Christine returned to be with her and Diana was sent to recover in Switzerland courtesy of the country's new National Health Service.

1952 was also the end of the stables that they had grown up with. Their mother would not allow the sisters to pay for their maintenance. At the stables they had taught Julian Popescu to ride and in 1954 Christine met him again and they were married.

During the 1970s, she suffered with a bad back and she reluctantly gave up riding.

She wrote several sequels to Black Beauty and the three sisters repeated the collaboration that had started their careers when they published "Black Beauty's Family" in 1975. There were three stories about three of Black Beauty's relatives: the racehorse Black Velvet, Black Ebony who works near the mines and Black Princess of World War One. Christine wrote about Black Velvet.

She was a member of PEN International, where her elder sister was President. She also started two groups of Riding for the Disabled. Besides running the stables she surrounded herself with animals and her four children were all members of the Pony Club.

== Death and legacy ==
She wrote more than 100 books, of which 40 were not about ponies. She wrote several book series including one about a horse called Phantom and another about a dog named Jessie. She died at the age of 80 on 2 December 2005 in Norwich.

== Works ==
- We Rode to the Sea (1948)
- We Hunted Hounds (1949)
- I Carried The Horn (1951)
- Goodbye To Hounds (1952)
- Riders From Afar (1954)
- Phantom Horse (1955)
- A Day To Go Hunting (1956)
- The First Rosette (1956)
- The Second Mount (1957)
- Stolen Ponies (1957)
- The Impossible Horse (1957)
- Three To Ride (1958)
- The Lost Pony (1959)
- Ride By Night (1960)
- The Horse Sale (1960)
- For Want Of A Saddle (1960)
- Giles And The Elephant (1960)
- The Empty Field (1961)
- Giles And The Greyhound (1961)
- The Open Gate (1962)
- Bandits In The Hills (1962)
- Giles And The Canal (1962)
- The Gipsy Children (1962)
- The Doping Affair (1963, later published as The Pony Dopers)
- The Eastmans In Brittany (1964)
- Granny Comes To Stay (1964)
- No-One At Home (1964)
- Homeless Katie (1964)
- The Boys From The Cafe (1965)
- The Eastmans Move House (1965)
- A Dog In A Pram (1965)
- The Eastmans Find A Boy (1966)
- The Stolen Car (1966)
- A Day To Remember (1966)
- The Lost Cow (1966)
- Little Black Pony (1967)
- Robbers In The Night (1967)
- Room To Let (1968)
- Nigel Eats His Words (1969)
- Phantom Horse Comes Home (1970)
- Riders On The March (1970)
- Phantom Horse Goes To Ireland (1972; later republished as Phantom Horse Disappears)
- They Rode To Victory(1972)
- A Pony Scrapbook (1972)
- I Rode A Winner (1973)
- A Second Pony Scrapbook (1973)
- Follyfoot Pony Quiz Book (1974)
- Black Velvet (1975)
- Good Riding (non-fiction, 1975)
- Christine Pullein-Thompson's Book of Pony Stories (1975)
- A Pony To Love (non-fiction, 1975)
- Strange Riders At Black Pony Inn (1976)
- Mystery At Black Pony Inn (1976)
- Pony Patrol (1977)
- Pony Patrol S.O.S. (1977)
- Pony Patrol Fights Back (1977)
- Christine Pullein-Thompson's Second Book of Pony Stories (1977)
- Ride Better And Better (with her sisters, non-fiction, 1977)
- Blossom (1978)
- Pony Parade (1978)
- Prince At Black Pony Inn (1978)
- Secrets At Black Pony Inn (1978)
- Riding For Fun (non-fiction) (1978)
- Improve Your Riding (non-fiction, 1979)
- Phantom Horse In Danger (1980)
- Pony Patrol And The Mystery Horse (1981)
- Phantom Horse Goes To Scotland (1981; later republished as Phantom Horse Island Mystery)
- Father Unknown (1981)
- Black Pioneer (1982)
- Ponies In The Park (1982)
- Ponies In The Forest (1983)
- Ponies In The Blizzard (1984)
- Wait For Me Phantom Horse (1985; later republished as Phantom Horse Wait For Me)
- A Home For Jessie (1986)
- Please Save Jessie (1987)
- Stay At Home, Ben (1987)
- Careless Ben (1988)
- The Big Storm (1988)
- The Road Through The Hills (1988)
- Candy Goes To The Gymkhana (1989)
- Candy Stops A Train (1989)
- Catastrophe At Black Pony Inn (1989)
- Good Deeds At Black Pony Inn (1989)
- Smoke In The Hills (1989)
- Across The Frontier (1990)
- Runaway Ben (1990)
- Come Home, Jessie (1991)
- The Long Search (1991)
- I Want That Pony! (1993)
- A Pony In Distress (1994)
- The Best Pony For Me! (1995)
- Fair Girls and Grey Horses (1996) (with her sisters).
- Horsehaven (1996)
- Bedtime Pony Stories (1997)
- Sundance Saves The Day (1997)
- More Bedtime Pony Stories (1997)
- The Pony Test (1997)
- Incredible Pony Tales (1998)
- Magical Pony Tales (1998)
- The Pony Picnic (1998)
- Havoc At Horsehaven (1999)
- Horsehaven Lives On (1999)
- A Yo-Yo For Sam (1999)

Note: The Impossible Horse has been published under the name of Christine Keir, which may have been a pseudonym, as it is the same story. Also, the book Riding (1983) has also been published under the same name.
