= Tamahine =

1963 British film by Philip Leacock

- 1963 theatrical poster
- Directed by: Philip Leacock
- Written by: Denis Cannan
- Based on: Novel by Thelma Niklaus
- Produced by: John Bryan
- Starring: Nancy Kwan; John Fraser; Dennis Price
- Cinematography: Geoffrey Unsworth
- Edited by: Peter Tanner
- Music by: Malcolm Arnold
- Production companies: Associated British Picture Corporation & Seven Arts
- Distributed by: Warner-Pathé Distributors (UK); Metro-Goldwyn-Mayer (U.S.)
- Release date: 18 July 1963 (London)
- Running time: 96 minutes
- Country: United Kingdom
- Language: English

Tamahine is a 1963 British comedy film directed by Philip Leacock and starring Nancy Kwan, Dennis Price and John Fraser. It was written by Denis Cannan based on the 1957 novel of the same title by Thelma Niklaus.

A Polynesian woman believes she can change the culture of a British boys' boarding school.

== Plot ==
When her father dies, orphan teenager Tamahine is sent from her South Pacific island home to live with Charles Poole, her father's cousin and the headmaster of Hallow, a prestigious all-male school in England. Richard, Charles' son and school student, falls in love with her, but she considers him tabu because of the closeness of their family relationship. Another suitor is the art master, Clove, after he breaks up with Charles' daughter Diana.

Meanwhile, Tamahine has trouble adjusting to the puzzling social mores of her new home, exasperating Charles, but making him start to question his own joyless existence. In the end, Richard convinces Tamahine that their connection is distant enough that marrying him does not violate English tabus, while Clove resigns to go paint in a foreign land, accompanied by Diana. The film leaps ahead several years, showing a scruffily bearded Charles enjoying life on Tamahine's island, while Richard takes his place as headmaster, watched by Tamahine and their children.

== Theme ==
A French Mistress, three years earlier (1960), used the same theme of a visiting foreign teacher at a British school causing a cultural clash.

== Cast ==
- Nancy Kwan as Tamahine
- John Fraser as Richard Poole
- Dennis Price as Charles Poole
- Coral Browne as Mme. Becque
- Dick Bentley as storekeeper
- Derek Nimmo as Clove
- Justine Lord as Diana
- James Fox as Oliver
- Michael Gough as Cartwright
- Allan Cuthbertson as housemaster
- Howard Marion-Crawford as housemaster
- William Mervyn as Lord Birchester
- Robin Stewart as fiend
- Bee Duffell as nun

== Production ==
The story was filmed at Wellington College in county Berkshire.

== Release ==
The film had its World Premiere on 18 July 1963 at the Empire, Leicester Square in London's West End.

== Reception ==
The Monthly Film Bulletin wrote: "Nancy Kwan bustles on a single note of monotonous provocation through this thin, depressingly familiar and weakly scripted story, whose triple peaks of invention involve Tamahine displaying herself before the school in her underwear, placing a chamber-pot on a steeple, and winning most of the events in the school sports. Both characters and acting are inevitably conventional, and only Dennis Price manages to inject a little wit and style. The colour and settings, however, are rather attractive, and lend the whole thing a certain faint, nostalgic charm (sports day, tea on the lawn, punting on the river, etc., etc.)."

Kine Weekly wrote: "The heroine of the story is uninhibited and the director has taken this as his cue throughout. All the characters, except, perhaps, the headmaster, are types rather than people, but they are amusing types and go through their paces without straining the credibility of the audience. The direction has been taken with commendable speed, but not without an appreciation of the aesthetic attractions of both the female form and of the natural and architectural backgrounds. ... John Fraser provides a neat picture as Richard, the 18-year-old schoolboy with ideas beyond the sixth form, and Dennis Price consistently steals the picture as the headmaster, who is not so stuffy as he looks. Subsidiary romance, and fun, is provided by Derek Nimmo as the bumbling young art master and, among other sporting players, Mishael Gough, provides a cruel cameo of a Reverend housemaster."

Variety wrote: "Whether Tamahine is intended as a sharp, sophisticated sex comedy or a satirical joshing of the British public school system (which is as near as possible to the U.S. high school regime) is a perplexing thought. But it turns out to be an uneasy blend of both and does not quite come off."

Leslie Halliwell wrote "Simple-minded school comedy with predictable situations."

In The Radio Times Guide to Films Adrian Turner gave the film 2/5 stars, writing: "Back in the 18th century, Captain Cook brought to England a Tahitian named Omai who caused considerable uproar and became a sexual magnet for ladies of wealth and discrimination. Transposed to an English boys' public school in 1963 with Nancy Kwan playing a Tahitian, the cultural collision doesn't have quite the same impact. Even so, the demure Miss Kwan drives everyone into a lather, including art master Derek Nimmo, posh pupil James Fox and supercilious headmaster Dennis Price."

== Home releases ==
The film was released as a Region 2 Dvd in the UK.
