= Diana Pullein-Thompson =

British writer of pony books (1925–2015)

- Born: 1 October 1925; Wimbledon, London, England
- Died: 21 September 2015 (aged 89)
- Other name: Diana Farr
- Occupation: Writer
- Known for: Books about ponies
- Spouse: Dennis Farr (m. 1959; died 2006)
- Relatives: Christine Pullein-Thompson (twin sister); Josephine Pullein-Thompson (sister)

Diana Farr (née Pullein-Thompson; 1 October 1925 – 21 September 2015), was a British horsewoman and writer known for her pony books. Her mother and two sisters also wrote and together they created a large number of children's books, many of which were on the theme of horses.

== Life ==
Pullein-Thompson was born into a notable family. Her father, Harold Pullein-Thompson, had the Military Cross and her mother, Joanna Cannan, was a prolific and successful author. She was the first of twins. She had an elder sister and an elder brother. He adopted his mother's name and become an actor and a successful comedy playwright as Denis Cannan. All the sisters became writers.

The family home was a villa in the suburb of Wimbledon. Diana's father was badly wounded in the war and in frequent pain (and a bad mood). He had earned the Military Cross. He had just survived when many of his fellows had been killed. He had been a teacher but he then sold fridges and had a game company, but it was her mother who made more money writing pony books on the kitchen table.

The family moved to Rotherfield Peppard in Oxfordshire where their large house, The Grove, had its own stables. The girls learned to ride and competed in events. In time they would describe their country childhood in their joint autobiography Fair Girls and Grey Horses (1996). The girls had an unusual education, unlike their brother who went to Eton College; they were taught by their mother. The girls were known for not conforming to expectations.

When Diana was fourteen and her big sister fifteen they abandoned education and started a riding school at their home. The riding school brought in extra money as the three sisters taught others to ride.

In 1946 she had her first book, I Wanted a Pony, published and she had a share in another book It Began With Picotee which the three sisters had created together in 1941, as it was published the same year.

The twins, Diana and Christine intended to be professional horse riders in America. Christine went to Virginia, but Diana was denied entry to the USA in 1952 as the medical revealed that she had tuberculosis. She was sent to recover in Switzerland courtesy of the country's new National Health Service. When she was better she set out to ride her horse Favorita, all the way from John O’Groats to Land’s End. She completed this journey in six weeks.

She went to work for Rosica Colin, a literary agent, but returned to writing. She married Denis Farr, another keen rider, in 1959. He had to move several times to follow his career, but she just continued to write. She was not quite as prolific as her two sisters but it was judged that her stories are the most socio-realistic. In 1978 she published a biography of her cousin Gilbert Cannan.

== Private life ==
She married Dennis Farr CBE in 1959. They had a son and a daughter. When Denis retired they moved to Haslemere in Surrey where they could both ride horses more easily. Denis died in Guildford in 2006.

== Works ==
- I Wanted A Pony (1946)
- Three Ponies and Shannan (1947)
- The Penny Fields (1949, has been published as The Pennyfields)
- A Pony To School (1950)
- A Pony For Sale (1951)
- Janet Must Ride (1953)
- Horses At Home and Friends Must Part (1954)
- Riding With The Lyntons (1956)
- Riding For Children (non-fiction, 1957)
- The Boy & The Donkey (1958, later republished as The Donkey Race)
- The Secret Dog (1958)
- The Boy Who Came To Stay (1960)
- The Hidden River (1960)
- Bindi Must Go (1962)
- The Battle Of Clapham Common (1962)
- The Hermit's Horse (1974)
- Black Princess (1975)
- Ponies In The Valley (1976)
- Ride Better And Better (with her sisters, non-fiction, 1977)
- Black Romany (1978)
- Ponies On The Trail (1978)
- Ponies In Peril (1979)
- Cassidy In Danger (1979, later republished as This Pony Is Dangerous)
- Only a Pony (1980)
- The Pony Seekers (1981)
- A Foal For Candy (1981)
- Black Piper (1982)
- A Pony Found (1983)
- Dear Pup: Letters To A Young Dog (1988)
- The Long Ride Home (1996)
- Fair Girls and Grey Horses (1996) (with her sisters).

As "Diana Farr"

- Gilbert Cannan; A Georgian Prodigy (1978)
- Five at 10: Prime Ministers' Consorts Since 1957 (1985)
- Choosing (1988)
