= Prince of Wales Theatre, Cardiff =

Pub in former theatre in Cardiff, Wales

Coordinates: 51.47750°N 3.17790°W

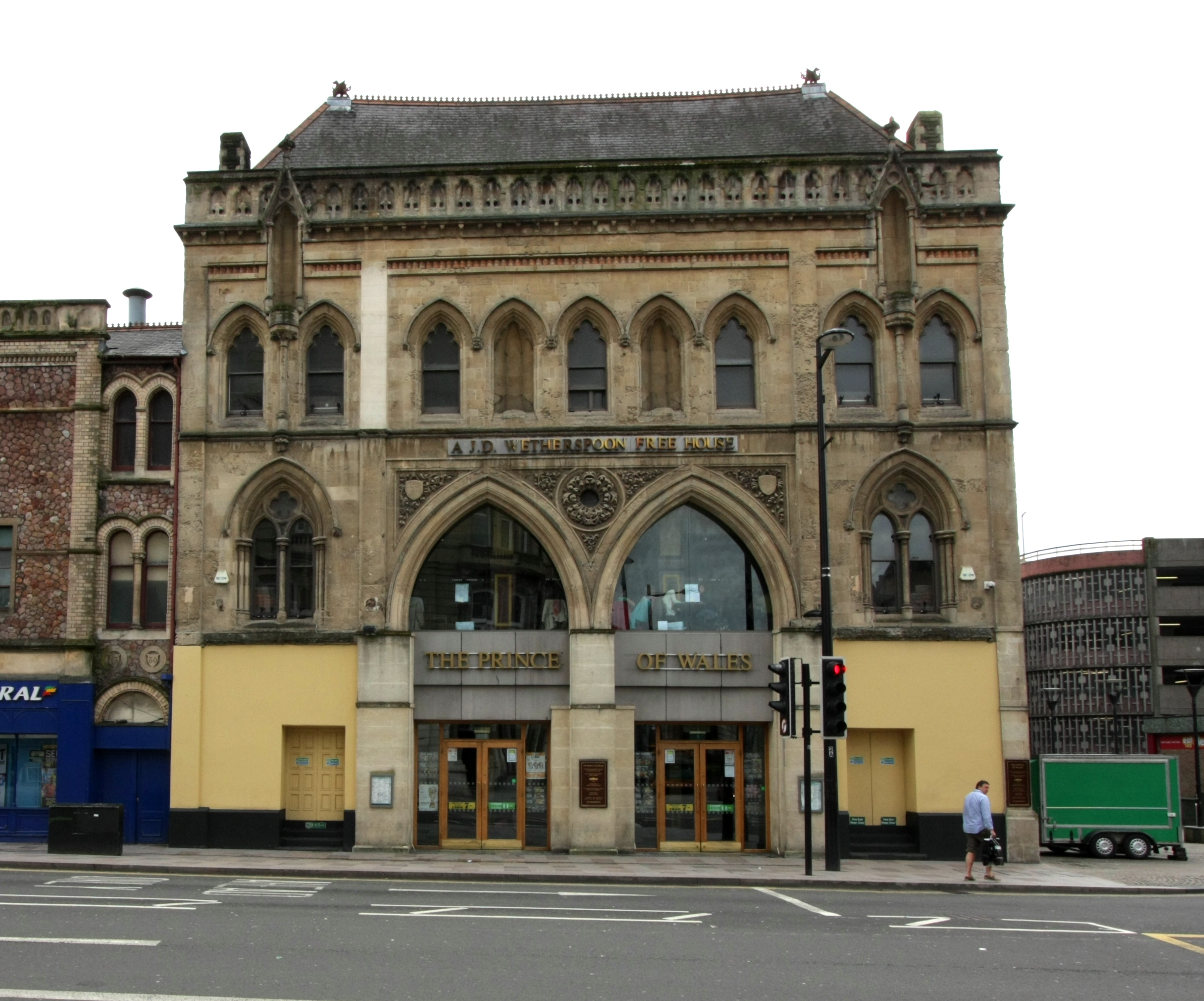
Wood Street façade

The Prince of Wales Theatre is a former theatre in central Cardiff. Built in 1878, seating 2,800, it later became a sex cinema. It is now a JD Wetherspoon pub.

The building is located near Cardiff Central railway station, near the corner of St Mary Street and Wood Street, with entrances and façades on both streets.

== Architecture ==
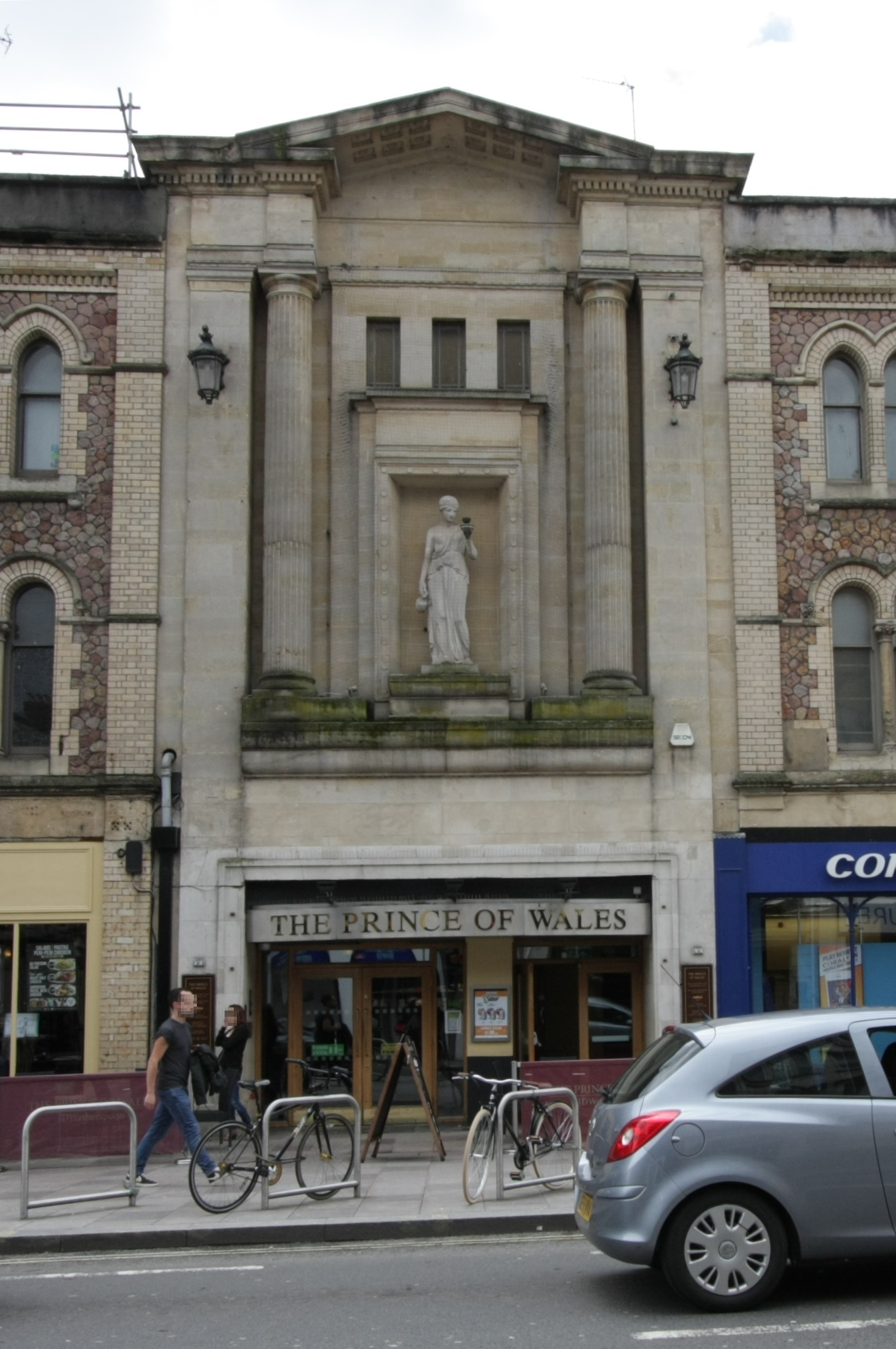
St Mary Street façade

The theatre was built in 1878 to a Venetian Gothic design by the architects W. D. Blessley and T. Waring, during a period when Cardiff, then a prosperous coal-exporting port, was rapidly expanding. The building was a prompt replacement of Cardiff's old Theatre Royal in Queen Street (built 1827, which had burnt down in December) doubling the audience capacity to almost 2000, and was opened on 7 October 1878. The main stage was 56 feet wide and 46 feet deep, framed by a proscenium arch 30 feet high, topped with the royal coat of arms. Interior decoration was in gold and white and the building was illuminated after dark using 800 gas lamps.

The theatre was later rebuilt in the Greek Revival style to a design by Willmott & Smith. An additional entrance on St Mary Street was added with two large fluted Doric columns flanking a neoclassical statue of a young woman holding a cup. The interior of the theatre was remodelled in 1920 in the same Greek style. The proscenium arch is flanked by massive Ionic columns carrying a large triangular pediment with an elaborate Grecian bas-relief frieze above.

In 1988, the interior was divided into multiple spaces for a variety of uses, including an amusement arcade and a pub. This largely obscured the original interior. The interior was again altered in 1999, converting the entire space into a pub and partly restoring the 1920 interior.

The building was designated a Grade II listed building in 1960.

== History ==
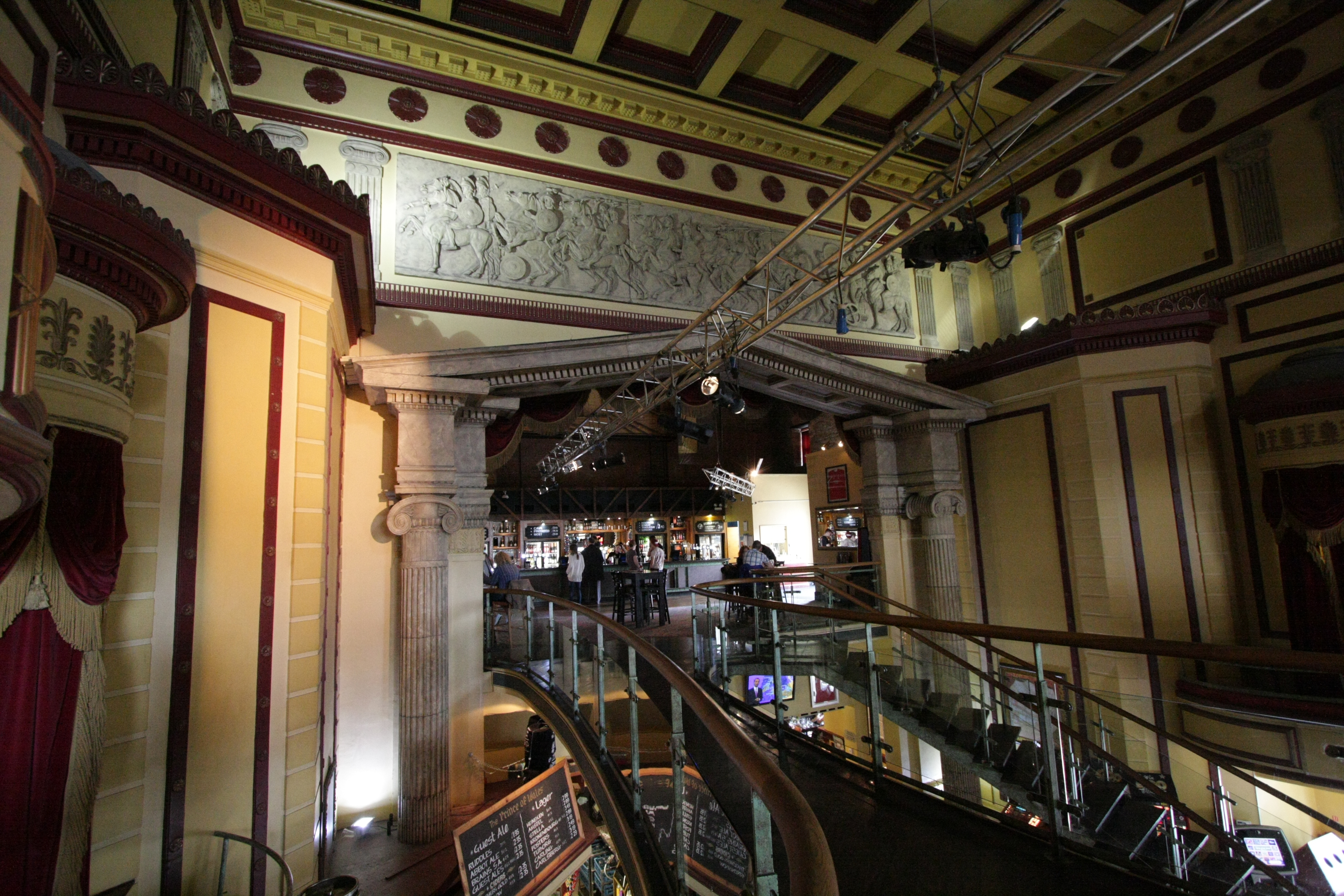
Interior showing the proscenium arch

From 1881, the theatre was managed by Edward John Fletcher (1837-1896).

- 1878–1914 "New Theatre Royal"
- 1914–1920 closed
- 1920–1924 "The Playhouse'
- 1931–1934 "The Playhouse, managed by William Coutts
- 1935–1957 "The Prince of Wales" (mainly live theatre)
- 1958–1974 Films and limited live theatre. Live shows stopped by 1965, and it became a sex cinema showing pornographic films.
- 1974 planning consent to demolish the building was refused.
- 1978-1979 upstairs space became Grannies punk nightclub run by Richard Haines
- 1984–1987 "Caeser's Nightclub"
- 1988 Converted into an amusement arcade and a pub
- 1999 Re-converted into a pub, partially restoring the interior.

In 1970 the Welsh Theatre Company was planning to move to the theatre, but this was abandoned.

== Notable productions ==
The opening production in 1878 was Pygmalion and Galatea by W. S. Gilbert.

The Welsh National Opera company's opening performance was at the theatre in 1946, when Cavalleria rusticana was performed. The Welsh tenor Robert Tear, then a schoolboy, started his career in this performance.

== Performers ==
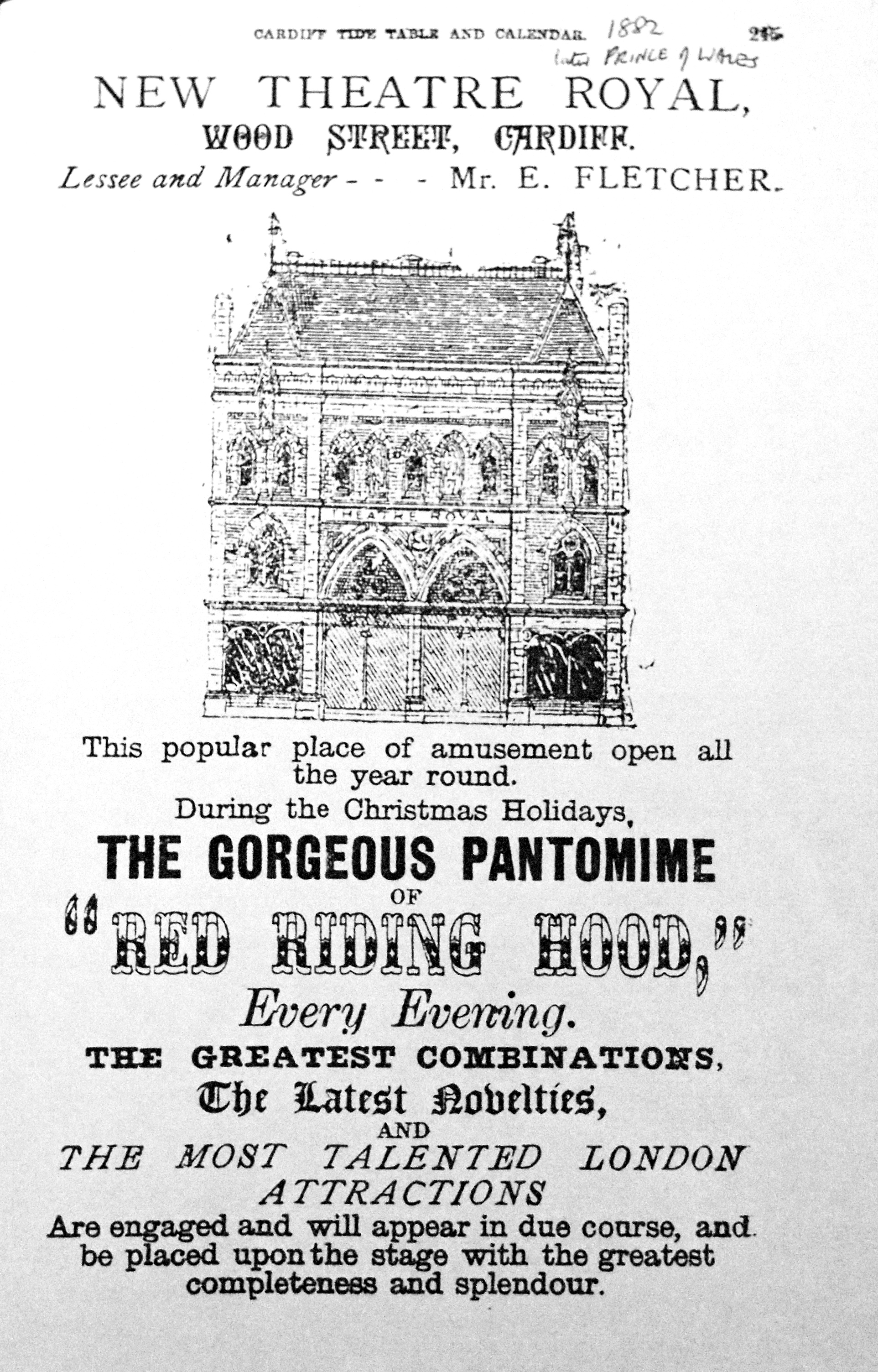
Advertisement (1882)

Several stars appeared in person at the theatre, including:

- Richard Burton
- Noël Coward
- John Gielgud
- Rex Harrison
- Kay Kendall
- Vivien Leigh
- Robert Montgomery
- Laurence Olivier
- Donald Wolfit

Binkie Beaumont (1908–1973) was appointed assistant manager of the theatre at the age of 16. This led to his career as a producer in London's West End.
