= Denis Cannan =

British playwright and screenwriter (1919–2011)

Denis Cannan (14 May 1919 – 25 September 2011) was a British dramatist, playwright and script writer. Born Denis Pullein-Thompson, the son of Captain Harold J. Pullein-Thompson and novelist Joanna Cannan, he changed his name by deed poll in 1964. His younger sisters were Josephine Pullein-Thompson, Diana Pullein-Thompson and Christine Pullein-Thompson.

== Life and career ==
Denis Pullein-Thompson was born in Oxford, he was educated at Eton College. After attending Eton he worked as an actor, before joining the Queen's Royal Regiment of West Surrey when the Second World War broke out, rising to the rank of captain and being mentioned in dispatches. He, as Denis Cannan, became a successful playwright and screenwriter known for his comedies. Apart from the plays listed below, he has written several screenplays for television and radio, also adaptions for television series. With Christopher Fry he adapted The Beggar's Opera for the 1953 film starring Laurence Olivier. He also wrote the screenplay for the 1963 fim, Tamahine, which should be compared in theme to The French Mistress, from 1960, (itself adapted from the 1955 play).

Cannan was married to Joan Ross in 1946; the couple had two sons and a daughter. The marriage was dissolved, and he later remarried, to Rose Evansky in 1965. Denis Cannan died on 25 September 2011, at the age of 92.

== Selected plays ==
- Captain Carvallo (1950)
- Misery Me! (1955) – broadcast by the BBC 1955 and by ABC in Australia in 1959
- The Power and the Glory (adaptation) (1956)
- US (1966)
- Colombe
- Dear Daddy (1976)
- Ibsen's Ghosts (adaptation)
- Max
- One At Night
- The Ik (1976, co-adaptor)
- You and Your Wife
- Who's Your Father?

== Film screenplays ==
- The Beggar's Opera (1953) – co-writer
- Alive and Kicking (1959) – co-writer
- Don't Bother to Knock (1961) – co-writer
- Tamahine (1963)
- Sammy Going South (1963)
- A High Wind in Jamaica (1965) – co-writer
