= Josephine Pullein-Thompson =

British writer

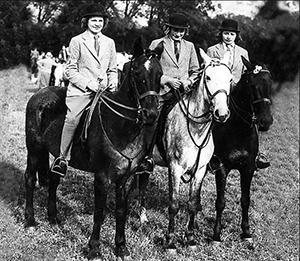
- The sisters, Josephine on the left, c. 1942
- Born: Josephine Mary Wedderburn Pullein-Thompson; 3 April 1924
- Died: 19 June 2014 (aged 90)
- Other names: Josephine Mann
- Occupation: Writer
- Known for: Books about ponies

Josephine Mary Wedderburn Pullein-Thompson MBE (3 April 1924 – 19 June 2014), sometimes known as Josephine Mann, was a British writer known for her pony books. She was a leading member of the Pony Club and PEN International. Her mother and two sisters, Christine and Diana also wrote and they created a large number of books and many of them were on the theme of horses.

== Life ==
Pullein-Thompson was born on 3 April 1924 into a notable family. Her father, Harold Pullein-Thompson, had won the Military Cross and her mother, Joanna Cannan, was a prolific and successful author. She was the second child, as she had an elder brother who would adopt his mother's name to be a successful playwright of comedies as Denis Cannan. She also had two younger sisters (who were twins), and all the children would be writers.

The family home was a villa in the suburb of Wimbledon, where her father would have two seats on the centre court. Her father was badly wounded and in frequent pain; he had earned the Military Cross during the war. He had been a teacher before the war but he sold fridges and had a game company. His game company was the first to manufacture the game "Go" under its Chinese name, but it was her mother who made more money writing pony books. The family moved to Rotherfield Peppard in Oxfordshire where their large house, The Grove, had its own stables. The girls learned to ride and would compete in events. In time they would describe their country childhood in their joint autobiography Fair Girls and Grey Horses (2014). The girls had an unusual education, as distinct from their brother who went to Eton College. She was taught by a "mad woman in a hut" and she was rebellious and stubborn. The girls prided themselves on not conforming to expectations.

When she was fifteen and her sisters were fourteen they abandoned education and started a riding school in wartime Britain. The riding school brought in extra money as the three sisters taught others to ride.

In 1946, she had her first book, Six Ponies, published. She had also helped write It Began With Picotee, which the three sisters created together in 1941, but published also in 1946. The sisters would write dozens of books and Josephine wrote four dozen herself.

Josephine was vice president of the Woodland Hunt Branch of the British Pony Club.

She was given the MBE in 1984.

She was the general secretary (1976–93) and then president of PEN International.

She got the Golden PEN Award in 2007 for her services to literature.

== Private life ==
For the last twenty years of his life, she was the devoted companion of the lawyer and author Anthony Babington. He had been so wounded during the Second World War that his girlfriend abandoned him. He had to regain his voice, as that part of his brain was damaged. Until he died in 2004, Babington would travel with Josephine to PEN meetings around the world.

== Works ==
- Six Ponies (1946)
- I Had Two Ponies (1947)
- Plenty of Ponies (1949)
- Pony Club Team (1950)
- The Radney Riding Club (1951)
- Prince Among Ponies (1952)
- One Day Event (1954)
- Show Jumping Secret (1955)
- Patrick's Pony (1956)
- Pony Club Camp (1957)
- The Trick Jumpers (1958)
- All Change (1961; later republished as The Hidden Horse)
- How Horses Are Trained (non-fiction, 1961)
- Ponies In Colour (non-fiction) (1962)
- Learn To Ride Well (non-fiction, 1966, later republished as How To Ride Well)
- Horses and Their Owners (non-fiction, 1970)
- Race Horse Holiday (1971, also published as Racehorse Holiday)
- Proud Riders (1973)
- Black Ebony (1975)
- Star Riders Of The Moor (1974; later republished as Star Riders)
- Ride Better And Better (with her sister, non-fiction, 1977)
- Fear Treks The Moor (1978)
- Black Nightshade (1978)
- Ride To The Rescue (1979)
- Ghost Horse On The Moor (1980)
- The No-Good Pony (1981)
- Treasure On The Moor (1982)
- The Prize Pony (1982)
- Black Raven (1982)
- Pony Club Cup (1982)
- Save The Ponies (1984)
- Mystery On The Moor (1984)
- Pony Club Challenge (1984)
- Pony Club Trek (1985)
- Suspicion Stalks The Moor (1986)
- Black Swift (1991)
- A Job With Horses (1994)

Dates Unknown

- Youth In The Saddle (contributor)

She wrote the adult mystery books Gin and Murder (1959), Murder Strikes Pink (1963) and They Died In The Spring (1960). She also wrote the book A Place With Two Faces (1972) under the pseudonym of Josephine Mann.
