= 2017 in United Kingdom politics and government =

== Events ==
=== January ===
- 4 January – Sir Tim Barrow is appointed as the UK's new ambassador to the European Union.
- 9 January – Northern Ireland's Deputy First Minister Martin McGuinness resigns.
- 16 January – The power-sharing government of Northern Ireland collapses following the resignation of Martin McGuinness.
- 24 January – The UK Supreme Court rules against the Government's Brexit appeal case by an 8 to 3 decision, stating that Parliament must vote to trigger Article 50.
- 30 January – A petition to stop US President Donald Trump's UK state visit gathers more than 1.8 million signatures.

=== February ===
- 1 February – MPs back the European Union Bill by 498 votes to 114, with 47 Labour rebels voting against.
- 3 February –
  - The government publishes a white paper setting out its Brexit plans.
  - The 2017 Copeland by-election is held. Conservative candidate Trudy Harrison gains the seat from Labour, the first gain for a governing party in a by-election since 1982. Labour win the Stoke-on-Trent Central by-election.
- 8 February – Labour MP Clive Lewis resigns from the Shadow Cabinet in protest over his party's decision to whip its MPs into voting to trigger Article 50.
- 22 February – The British government confirms that in future MPs will be able to use the Welsh language during meetings of the Welsh Grand Committee.
- 23 February – By-elections are held in Copeland and Stoke-on-Trent Central to fill vacancies arising from the resignation of sitting Labour MPs. Trudy Harrison wins the Copeland seat for the Conservative Party and Gareth Snell retains the Stoke-on-Trent Central seat for the Labour Party. Labour had held the Copeland seat since its creation, and the Conservative win is the first gain by a serving government in a by-election for 35 years.* 26 February – Father of the House of Commons and veteran Labour MP Gerald Kaufman passes away at the age of 86.

=== March ===
- 2 March – New elections to the Northern Ireland Assembly are held. The Democratic Unionist Party loses ten seats, while Sinn Féin loses one seat.
- 8 March
  - Philip Hammond delivers the March 2017 United Kingdom budget, his first as Chancellor of the Exchequer.
  - Lord Michael Heseltine is sacked from his role as a government adviser following his rebellion against the government on the Brexit Bill in the House of Lords the previous day.
- 14 March – The British Parliament passes the Brexit bill, paving the way for the UK Government to trigger Article 50; so that the UK can formally withdraw from the European Union.
- 15 March – Chancellor of the Exchequer Philip Hammond is forced to make a U-turn on his commitment to raising National Insurance contributions for the self-employed after vast opposition from Conservative backbenchers.
- 16 March
  - The European Union (Notification of Withdrawal) Bill is given Royal Assent by HM The Queen, making it an Act of Parliament.
  - Theresa May formally rejects Scottish First Minister Nicola Sturgeon's second Scottish Independence Referendum timetable for Autumn 2018, or at least before Brexit negotiations are concluded.
- 29 March – The United Kingdom invokes Article 50 of the Treaty on European Union, beginning the formal EU withdrawal process.

=== April ===
- 6 April – Mark Reckless AM quits UKIP and will now support the Conservative Party group in the National Assembly for Wales.
- 8 April – Robin Swann is announced as the new Ulster Unionist Party leader.
- 18 April – Prime Minister Theresa May calls a snap general election for 8 June.
- 19 April – The House of Commons formally approves the calling of an early general election with the necessary two-thirds majority in a 522 to 13 vote.
- 20 April – The 2017 Manchester Gorton by-election is cancelled following the announcement of an impending general election. This was the first time a UK by-election had been cancelled since 1924.

=== May ===
- 4 May
  - Buckingham Palace announces that the Duke of Edinburgh is to step down from carrying out royal engagements in the autumn.
  - Local government elections are held across England, Scotland and Wales. The Conservative Party makes significant gains at the expense of the Labour Party, gaining 500 seats and seizing control of 11 councils. UKIP loses all 145 seats they were defending. The Liberal Democrats lose 41 seats, despite their share of the vote increasing. Labour is pushed into third place by the Conservatives in Scotland, where the SNP is comfortably the largest party despite failing to take control of target councils. The Conservatives win four out of six metro-mayoral areas, including in the traditionally Labour-voting Tees Valley and West Midlands.
- 23 May – General election campaigning from all major political parties is temporarily suspended after the previous day's attack in Manchester.

=== June ===
- 8 June – The 2017 United Kingdom general election is held.
- 8 June – general election 2017: The Conservatives remain the largest party, but fail to get enough seats for a majority, leading to a hung parliament. In a surprise result, they are reduced from 330 to 318 seats. PM Theresa May rejects calls for her to resign and attempts to form a coalition with the DUP, which would give her 10 additional seats. Labour gain 32 seats, with particular success in London; the SNP suffers heavy losses with 21 fewer seats; the Liberal Democrats gain four seats for a total of 12; UKIP lose their sole seat and Paul Nuttall resigns as party leader.
- 10 June – 10 Downing Street issues a statement claiming the Democratic Unionist Party have agreed a confidence-and-supply deal to support a Conservative minority government. However, both parties subsequently confirm that talks about an agreement are still ongoing.
- 14 June – Tim Farron resigns as leader of the Liberal Democrats.
- 18 June – The Government announces that there will be no Queen's Speech in 2018, to give MPs more time to deal with Brexit laws.
- 19 June – Brexit Secretary David Davis heads to Brussels as formal negotiations with the EU get underway.
- 26 June – The Conservatives agree a £1 billion deal with Northern Ireland's Democratic Unionist Party to support Theresa May's Conservative minority government.
- 27 June – Nicola Sturgeon announces that she will delay plans for a proposed second Scottish independence referendum.
- 30 June – The leader of Kensington and Chelsea council, Nick Paget-Brown, resigns following criticism over the Grenfell Tower fire enquiry.

=== July ===
- 19 July – The government announces that a rise in the State Pension age to 68 will be phased in between 2037 and 2039, rather than from 2044 as was originally planned. This will affect 6 million men and women currently aged between 39 and 47 years old.
- 20 July – Sir Vince Cable becomes the new leader of the Liberal Democrats after nominations close without any challengers.
- 22 July – Michelle Brown, UKIP member of the Welsh Assembly for north Wales, admits and apologises for using a racial slur in a telephone conversation, after her former assistant Nigel Williams released a recording of the call.
- 26 July – The Supreme Court rules that employment tribunal fees are unlawful, meaning the government will have to repay up to £32m to claimants.

=== August ===
- 2 August – The Duke of Edinburgh carries out his final official engagement before retiring from public duties at age 96.
- 21 August – The chimes of Big Ben fall silent as a four-year renovation of the building begins.
- 29 August – Kezia Dugdale resigns as Leader of the Scottish Labour Party after two years in the role

=== September ===
- 11 September – In a Commons vote, MPs back the EU Withdrawal Bill by 326 to 290, as critics warn it represents a "power grab" by ministers.

=== October ===
- 2 October – Secretary of State for Wales Alun Cairns attacks First Minister Carwyn Jones in a speech, accusing him of being "obsessed with power".

=== November ===
- 1 November
  - Defence Secretary Sir Michael Fallon resigns following allegations of inappropriate past behaviour.
  - The Government loses an opposition vote calling on it to publish impact assessments of Brexit on more than 50 key industries.
- 2 November –
  - Gavin Williamson replaces Michael Fallon as defence secretary.
  - First Minister of Scotland Nicola Sturgeon and Cabinet Secretary for Finance and Constitution Derek Mackay set out the Scottish Government's income tax options regarding a rise in the rate of Scottish income tax.
- 3 November – Welsh Assembly minister Carl Sargeant is suspended by the Labour Party pending an investigation into allegations of sexual misconduct. He is found dead four days later, having killed himself.
- 7 November – Nicola Sturgeon, Scotland's First Minister, apologises to gay men convicted of sexual offences that are no longer illegal as new legislation is introduced that will automatically pardon gay and bisexual men convicted under historical laws.
- 13 November – David Davis announces that Parliament will be given a vote on the final Brexit deal before the United Kingdom leaves the European Union in 2019.
- 17 November – Sarah Clarke, current championship director of the All England Lawn Tennis Club, is appointed as the first female Black Rod. She will take up the position in January 2018, and have the title "The Lady Usher of the Black Rod".
- 18 November
  - Richard Leonard is elected as the new Scottish Labour leader after Kezia Dugdale resigned from the role in August.
  - Gerry Adams announces his intention to stand down as Sinn Féin president in 2018.
- 22 November – Chancellor Phillip Hammond delivers the November 2017 budget.

=== December ===
- 3 December – Alan Milburn and the entire Social Mobility Commission quit their roles, citing ‘lack of political leadership’, a repeated refusal to properly resource and staff the commission, an obsession with Brexit and an ‘absence’ of policy.
- 8 December – The United Kingdom and European Union reach agreement on the first stage of Brexit.
- 13 December – After a rebellion by Conservative MPs, the government is defeated in a key vote on Brexit, with MPs voting in favour of giving Parliament a say on the final deal struck with the EU.
- 14 December – The Scottish government's budget proposes splitting the 20% income tax band into three with a new lower band of 19%, a 20% band, and a 21% band for those earning over £24,000.
- 20 December – The EU announces that the UK's Brexit transition period will end no later than 31 December 2020.

== Deaths ==
- 4 January – John Cummings, 73, politician, MP for Easington (1987–2010).
- 8 January – Nigel Spearing, 86, politician, MP for Acton (1970–1974) and Newham South (1974–1997).
- 10 January –
  - Ronald Buxton, 93, politician, MP for Leyton (1965–1966).
  - William Goodhart, Baron Goodhart, 83, lawyer and politician.
- 22 January – Katharine Macmillan, Viscountess Macmillan of Ovenden, 96, politician and aristocrat.
- 26 January – Tam Dalyell, 84, politician, MP for West Lothian (1962–1983) and Linlithgow (1983–2005).
- 8 February – Sir John Wells, 91, politician, MP for Maidstone (1959–1987).
- 19 February – Don Dixon, Baron Dixon, 87, politician, MP for Jarrow (1979–1997).
- 23 February – David Waddington, Baron Waddington, 87, politician, MP (1968–1974, 1979–1990), Home Secretary (1989–1990), Leader of the House of Lords (1990–1992) and Governor of Bermuda (1992–1997).
- 26 February – Sir Gerald Kaufman, 86, politician, MP for Manchester Ardwick (1970–1983) and Manchester Gorton (since 1983), Father of the House (since 2015).
- 1 March – P. J. Bradley, 76, politician, member of the Northern Ireland Assembly (1998–2011).
- 8 March – Sir Clive Bossom, 99, baronet, politician and MP for Leominster (1959–1974).
- 10 March – Glyn Tegai Hughes, 94, academic and politician.
- 12 March – Ray Hassall, 74, politician, Lord Mayor of Birmingham (2015–2016).
- 21 March – Martin McGuinness, 66, politician, deputy First Minister of Northern Ireland (2007–2017), MP (1997–2013), MLA (1998–2017) and former Provisional Irish Republican Army (IRA) leader.
- 24 March – Piers Dixon, 88, politician, MP for Truro (1970–1974).
- 28 March – Gwilym Prys Davies, Baron Prys-Davies, 93, lawyer and politician.
- 6 April – John Fraser, 82, politician, MP for Norwood (1966–1997).
- 11 May – Nigel Forman, 74, politician, MP for Carshalton and Wallington (1976–1997).
- 17 May – Rhodri Morgan, 77, politician, MP for Cardiff West (1987–2001), Leader of Welsh Labour (2000–2009) and First Minister of Wales (2000–2009).
- 24 May – Paul Keetch, 56, politician, MP for Hereford (1997–2010).
- 30 May – John Taylor, 75, politician, MP for Solihull (1983–2005).
- 6 June – Bill Walker, 88, politician, MP for Perth and East Perthshire (1979–1983) and North Tayside (1983–1997).
- 12 June – Richard Long, 4th Viscount Long, 88, peer and politician.
- 25 June
  - Robert Overend, 86, farmer and politician.
  - Sir Richard Paniguian, 67, civil servant and industrialist.
  - Gordon Wilson, 79, politician, leader of the Scottish National Party (1979–1990), MP (1974–1987).
- 26 June – David Bleakley, 92, politician, Northern Irish MP (1958–1965).
- 29 June – James Davidson, 90, politician, MP for West Aberdeenshire (1966–1970).
- 6 July – Frederick Tuckman, 95, politician, MEP for Leicester (1979–1989).
- 14 July – Roland Moyle, 89, politician, MP for Lewisham North (1966–1974) and Lewisham East (1974–1983).
- 21 July – Gary Waller, 72, politician, MP for Brighouse and Spenborough (1979–1983) and Keighley (1983–1997).
- 6 August – Kevin McNamara, 82, former Labour Party MP and Shadow Secretary of State for Northern Ireland.
- 31 August – Sir Edward du Cann, 93, politician, MP for Taunton (1956–1987).
- 7 September – Mike Hicks, 80, politician, General Secretary of the Communist Party of Britain (1988–1998).
- 19 September
  - Sir Brian Barder, 83, diplomat, High Commissioner to Nigeria (1988–1991) and Australia (1991–1994).
  - Christine Butler, 73, politician, MP for Castle Point (1997–2001).
  - Sir John Hunt, 88, politician, MP for Bromley (1964–1974) and Ravensbourne (1974–1997).
- 20 September – Sir Teddy Taylor, 80, politician, MP for Glasgow Cathcart (1964–1979) and Rochford and Southend East (1980–2005).
- 22 September – Bill Michie, 81, politician, MP for Sheffield Heeley (1983–2001).
- 1 October – John Swinburne, 87, politician, founder of SSCUP and member of the Scottish Parliament (2003–2007).
- 24 October – Glenn Barr, 75, politician (UDA) and advocate, member of Northern Ireland Assembly and Constitutional Convention.
- 30 October
  - Candy Atherton, 62, politician, MP for Falmouth and Camborne (1997–2005).
  - Frank Doran, 68, politician, MP for Aberdeen South (1987–1992) and Aberdeen North (1997–2015).
- 2 November – Sir Michael Latham, 74, politician, MP for Melton (1974–1983) and Rutland and Melton (1983–1992).
- 7 November – Carl Sargeant, 49, politician.
- 17 November – Bill Pitt, 80, politician, MP for Croydon North West (1981–1983).
- 4 December – Jimmy Hood, 69, politician, MP for Clydesdale (1987–2005) and Lanark and Hamilton East (2005–2015).
- 19 December – Sir Peter Terry, 91, Royal Air Force marshal and politician, Governor of Gibraltar (1985–1989).
- 22 December – Eric Moonman, 88, politician, MP for Billericay (1966–1970) and Basildon (1974–1979), and chairman of the Zionist Federation of Great Britain and Ireland (1975–1980).
