= Sewell Barn Theatre =

Theatre in Norwich, England

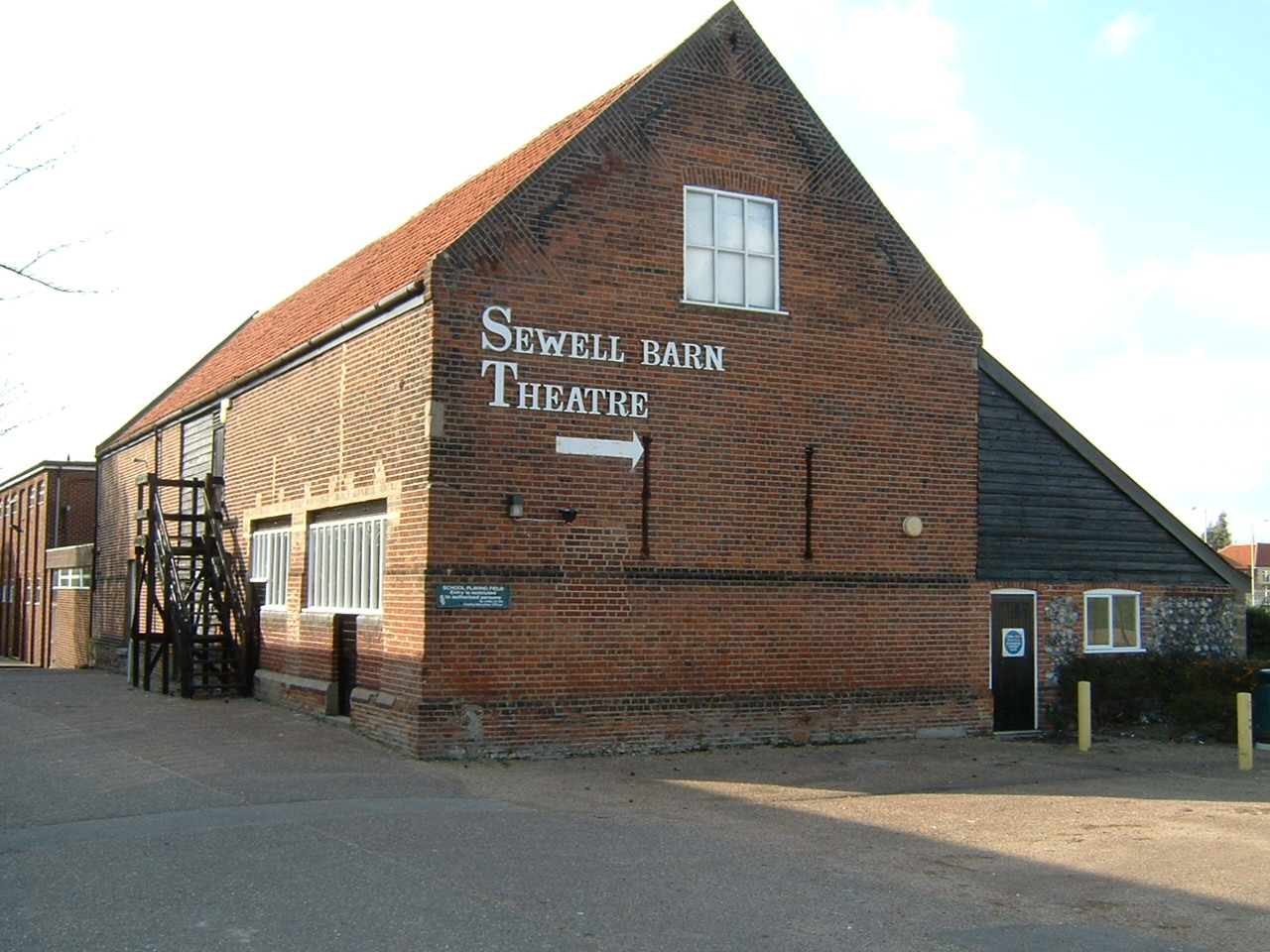
- The theatre
- Interactive map of Sewell Barn Theatre
- Address: Constitution Hill, Norwich; Norwich; England
- Coordinates: 52.648128°N 1.298707°E
- Capacity: 100

Construction
- Opened: 1980

Website
- www.sewellbarn.org/

Sewell Barn Theatre is located in the grounds of Sewell Park Academy (formerly the Blyth school, later the Blyth-Jex school and Sewell Park College) on Constitution Hill in Norwich, England. It is home to a popular amateur theatre company, with close historical links to the author Anna Sewell who wrote Black Beauty.

== The auditorium ==
The auditorium features raked seating on three sides of an open acting space. This unusual staging helps to draw the audience deeply into the performance. Ground level spaces can be provided for audience members with limited mobility.

The auditorium also serves as a space for presentations, meetings and other private hire uses.

== History ==
Originally the barn belonged to Clare House which was owned by Philip Sewell, a local benefactor, from 1864 to 1906. http://www.literarynorfolk.co.uk/Norwich/anna_sewell.htm

Anna Sewell, author of the children’s story "Black Beauty", was Philip’s sister and lived in the White House, Spixworth Road, Spixworth. Philip owned a mare called Black Bess which used to draw his carriage along Spixworth Road and it might be supposed that Bess was the original inspiration for Black Beauty, and the barn a prototype for Black Beauty’s stable. The book was published by Jarrolds in 1877.

Philip Sewell died in 1906 and left his house and estate to the City of Norwich. Clare House became an open air school for city children suffering from respiratory complaints and the barn became their washroom, restroom and handicraft centre.

Since then the old hay barn has seen many uses. During the First World War it was used as a theatre when Catton residents put on a concert for troops billeted in the area. It was used for storage and also as a bicycle shed for girls of the Blyth School (which was constructed in 1929 in the grounds of Clare House). Clare House was demolished in 1970 and out of the rubble rose the foundations of part of the new Blyth Jex school. The barn later housed the very first school minibus.

During a visit to the school in 1974 it was suggested by Norfolk County Councillors that the barn might make an admirable small theatre. At the time the barn was a dirty, leaky building stacked with broken school furniture and other accumulated rubbish. It took several years for this building, with the help of Valerie Glauert - head of Blyth Jex School - to be turned into a fully functioning small theatre.

== The Sewell Barn Theatre Company ==
In 1980, the Sewell Barn Theatre Company was formed. Their first public production The Norfolk Furies was written and directed by Henry Burke (the first Artistic Director), and staged at the barn.

The company stages a number of productions every year, ranging from Shakespeare to Alan Ayckbourn. In February 2008 the company presented its 200th production The Winter's Tale.

== Today ==
Membership of the Sewell Barn company is open to everyone, and workshops are open to non-members. The foyer was renovated in 2012.

As of 2026, the Artistic Director is Sabrina Poole.

== See also ==
- Maddermarket Theatre
- Theatre Royal, Norwich
- Sewell Park
- Norwich Playhouse
