= Sewell Park, Norwich =

Triangular park in Norwich, England

Coordinates: 52.645537°N 1.297749°E

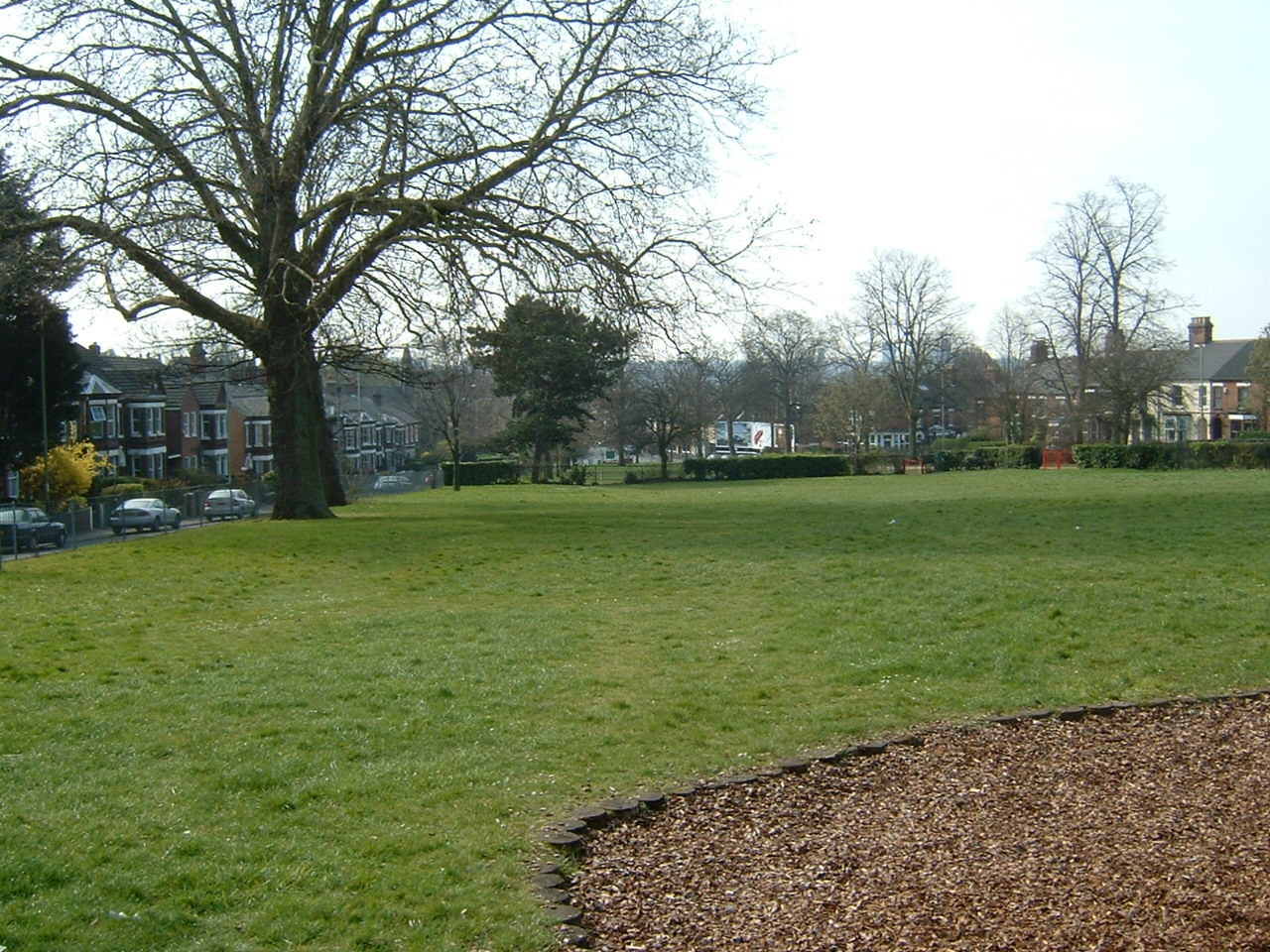
Sewell Park, Norwich - looking towards the city centre

Sewell Park is a triangular park between Constitution Hill and St. Clement's Hill in Norwich, Norfolk, England. The park was given to the Norwich Corporation and Norwich City Council as an open space by members of the Sewell family and former mayor Edward Gurney Buxton in 1908. The park was formally opened on July 5, 1909.

At the entrance to the park is a commemorative horse trough in honour of Anna Sewell, the author of Black Beauty, and other members of the Sewell family.

Facilities in the park include an open green space and a designated play area for children. The park contains specimen trees including several London planes. From the top of the park, the steeples of Norwich Cathedral, St John the Baptist Cathedral, Norwich, St. Peter Mancroft and the clock-tower of Norwich City Hall can be seen.

Adjacent to the park is Sewell Park Academy, where the Sewell Barn Theatre is in the school grounds. There is another entrance to the park opposite Sewell Road.

== Centenary ==
The park celebrated its centenary on Sunday July 6, 2008. The event will involve members of the community and local schools.

== Gallery ==
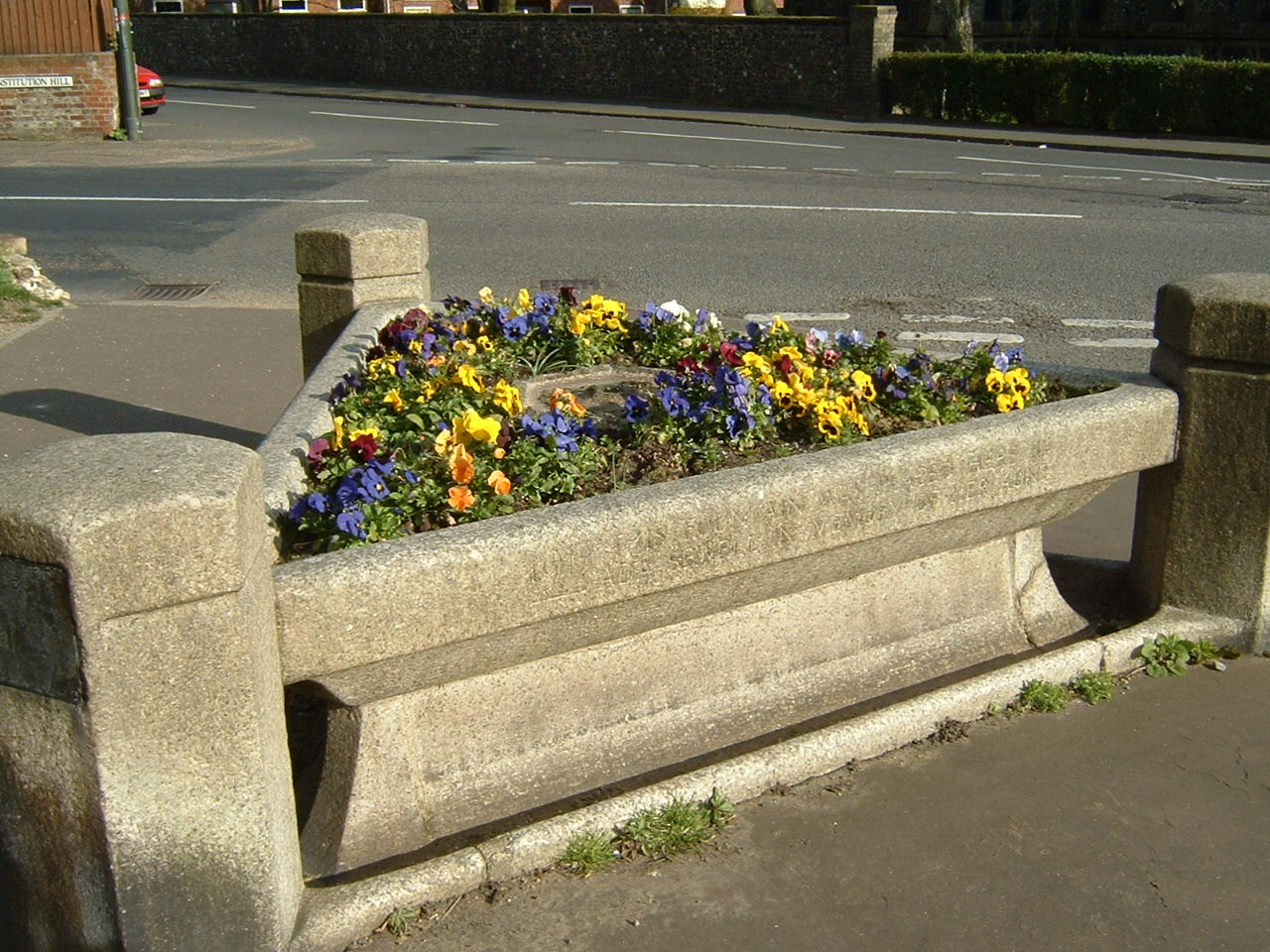
Sewell family memorial horse trough by park entrance

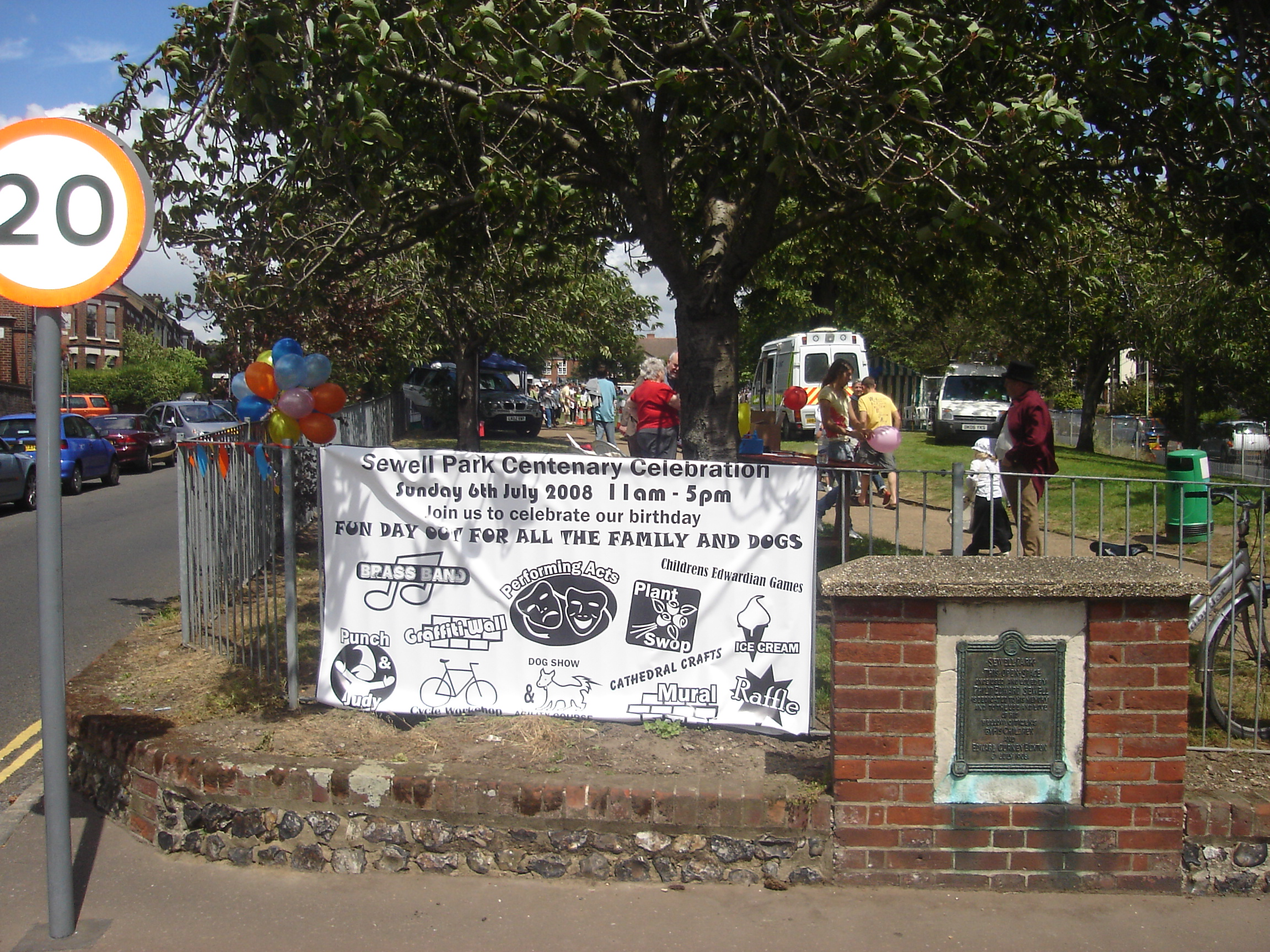
Sewell Park centenary. 6 July, 2008

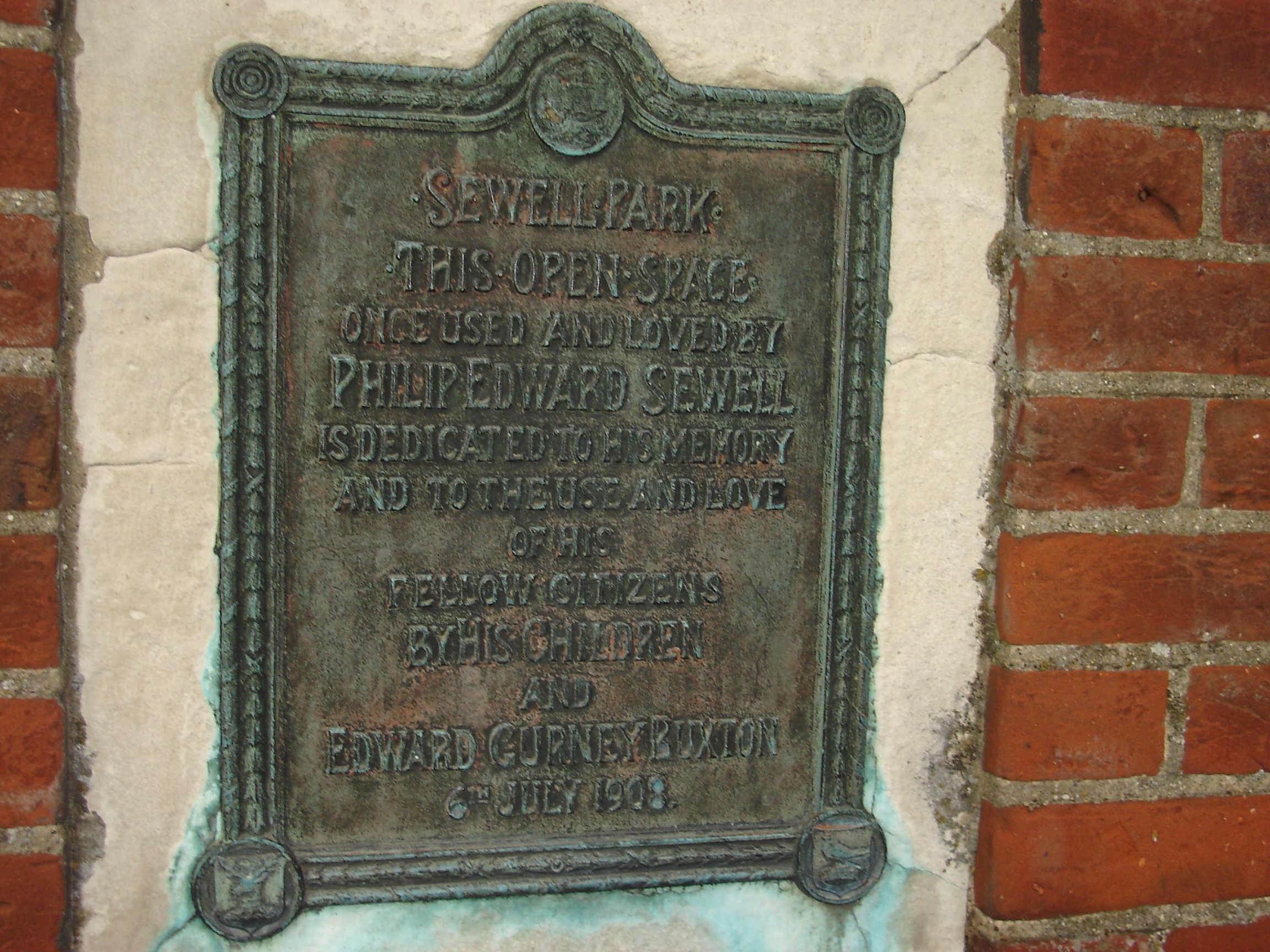
Memorial plaque at the entrance of park

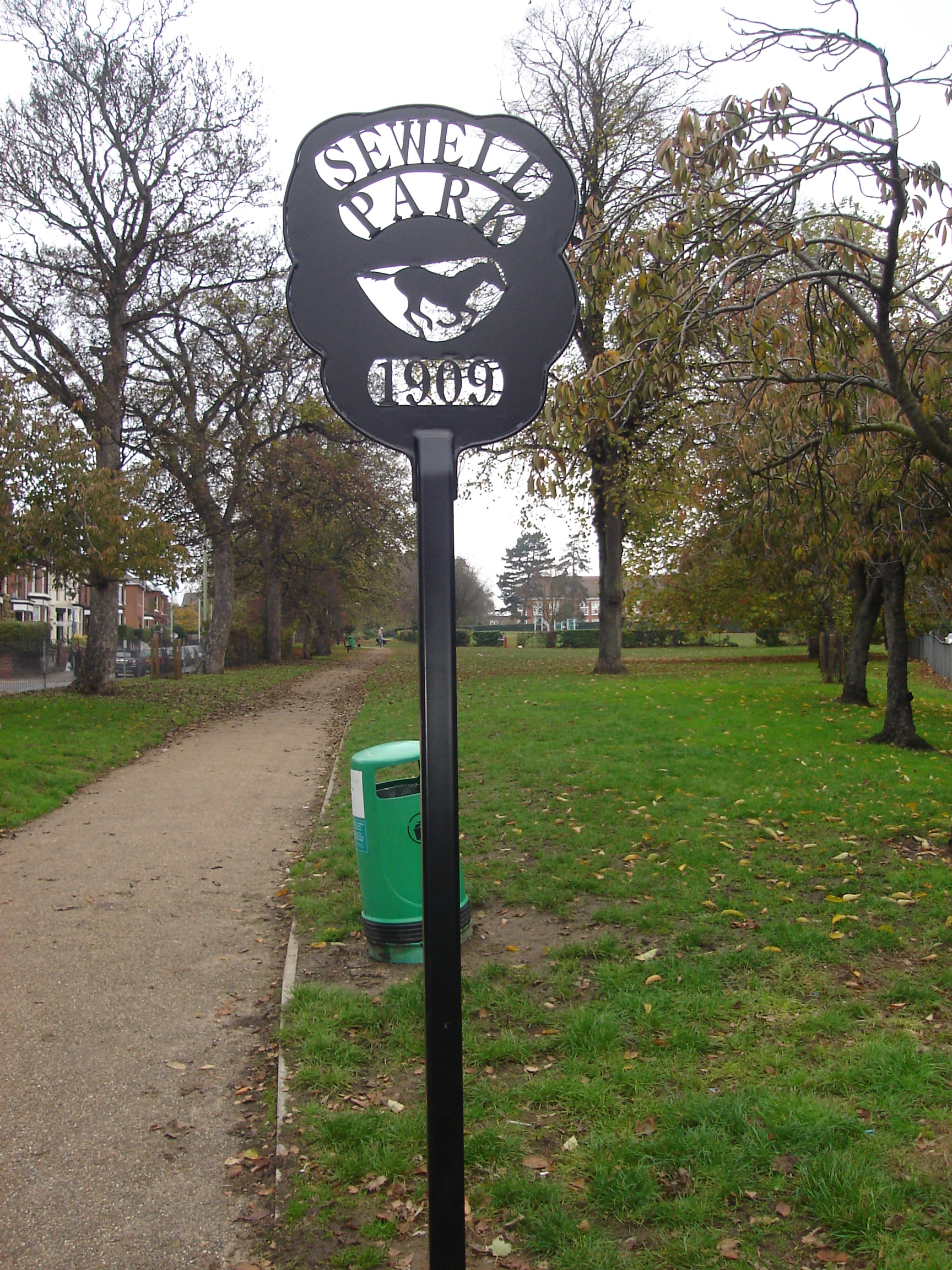
The centennial sign depicts the image of Black Beauty
