= Black Beauty (1978 film) =

1978 film

- Based on: Black Beauty by Anna Sewell
- Written by: Kimmer Ringwald
- Directed by: Chris Cuddington
- Voices of: Catherine Cordell; Alan Dinehart; Mike Evans; David Gregory; Alan Young; Laurie Main
- Narrated by: Alan Young
- Music by: Australian Screen Music
- Countries of origin: Australia; United States
- Original language: English

Production
- Executive producers: William Hanna; Joseph Barbera
- Producer: Neil Balnaves
- Editors: Peter Jennings; Robert Ciaglia
- Running time: 60 minutes
- Production company: Hanna-Barbera Australia

Original release
- Network: CBS
- Release: October 28, 1978

Black Beauty is a 1978 animated television film produced by the Australian division of Hanna-Barbera and based on the 1877 novel by Anna Sewell. It originally aired October 28, 1978 as part of Famous Classic Tales on CBS.

The special was released on VHS by Worldvision Home Video (now CBS Home Entertainment) in 1983 and re-released through Goodtimes Home Video under the Kids Klassics Home Video label in 1987 and was released on DVD by Koch Vision.

== Voices ==
- Catherine Cordell as Duchess
- Alan Dinehart
- Mike Evans
- David Gregory
- Barbara Stephens
- Alan Young as Narrator / Black Beauty / Nicholas Skinner
- Cam Young
- Laurie Main as Farmer Grey / Squire Douglas Gordon / Pipe Smoking Stable Owner
- Colin Hamilton
- Patricia Sigris
- David Comford

== See also ==
- List of films about horses
