= Abson =

Village in South Gloucestershire, England

Coordinates: 51.471534°N 2.426714°W

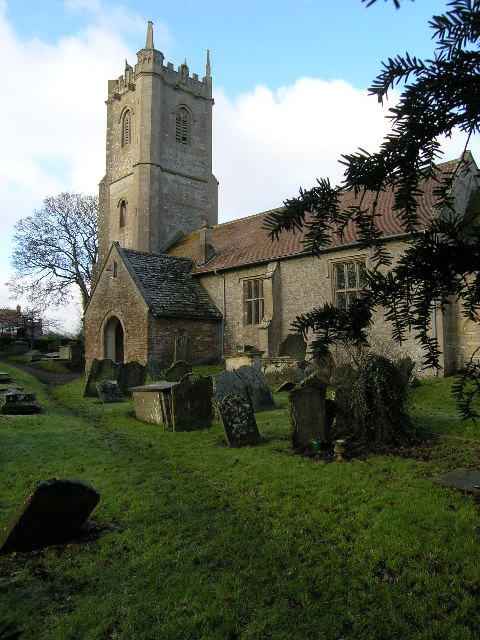
- St James the Great Church, Abson

- Location within Gloucestershire
- Population: 1,930 (Wick and Abson) (2021)
  - London: 113 mi (182 km) E
- District: South Gloucestershire
- Shire county: Gloucestershire
- Region: South West
- Country: England
- Sovereign state: United Kingdom
- Post town: BRISTOL
- Postcode district: BS30
- Dialling code: 0117
- Police: Avon and Somerset
- Fire: Avon
- Ambulance: South Western
- UK Parliament: Thornbury and Yate

Abson is a small village in South Gloucestershire, England, it forms part of the civil parish of Wick and Abson.

== Location ==
Abson is located on a minor road between the villages of Wick and Pucklechurch. It is a mainly nucleated in pattern with some additional outlying farms and settlements. The centre of the village is a small village green and the church.

Abson is part of the Church of England parish of Wick and Abson, and is part of the parliamentary constituency of Thornbury and Yate.

== History ==
The name Abson is a corruption of Abbotston - a place belonging to the Abbot. This was the Abbot of Glastonbury, as the manor of Pucklechurch (including Abson and other surrounding villages) was given to the Abbot after the murder of King Edmund at neighbouring Pucklechurch. In the 16th century the village was called Abston, and was since shortened to Abson.

Blue Lodge, one of the houses, was once the home of Anna Sewell, author of Black Beauty. Whilst staying there she witnessed a man killed by a cart and this was incorporated into the novel.

== The Church ==
Abson is centred on the church. It is dedicated to St James the Great, and is a Grade I listed building, as are the churchyard walls (with distinctive Bristol Black coping) and many of the graves. The neighbouring farmhouse, stables and barn (which have been converted into homes) are all Grade II listed.

There are two fragments of carved knotwork masonry on the walls as well as a figure thought once to have been a Sheela na Gig, now understood to be a carving of a male figure, high on the East wall. This figure is believed to date from Saxon or early Norman times.

The church contains an early 17th-century pulpit with a sounding board and 18th-century woodwork.

The belltower contains six bells which are still rung by hand.
