= Mel Read =

British politician

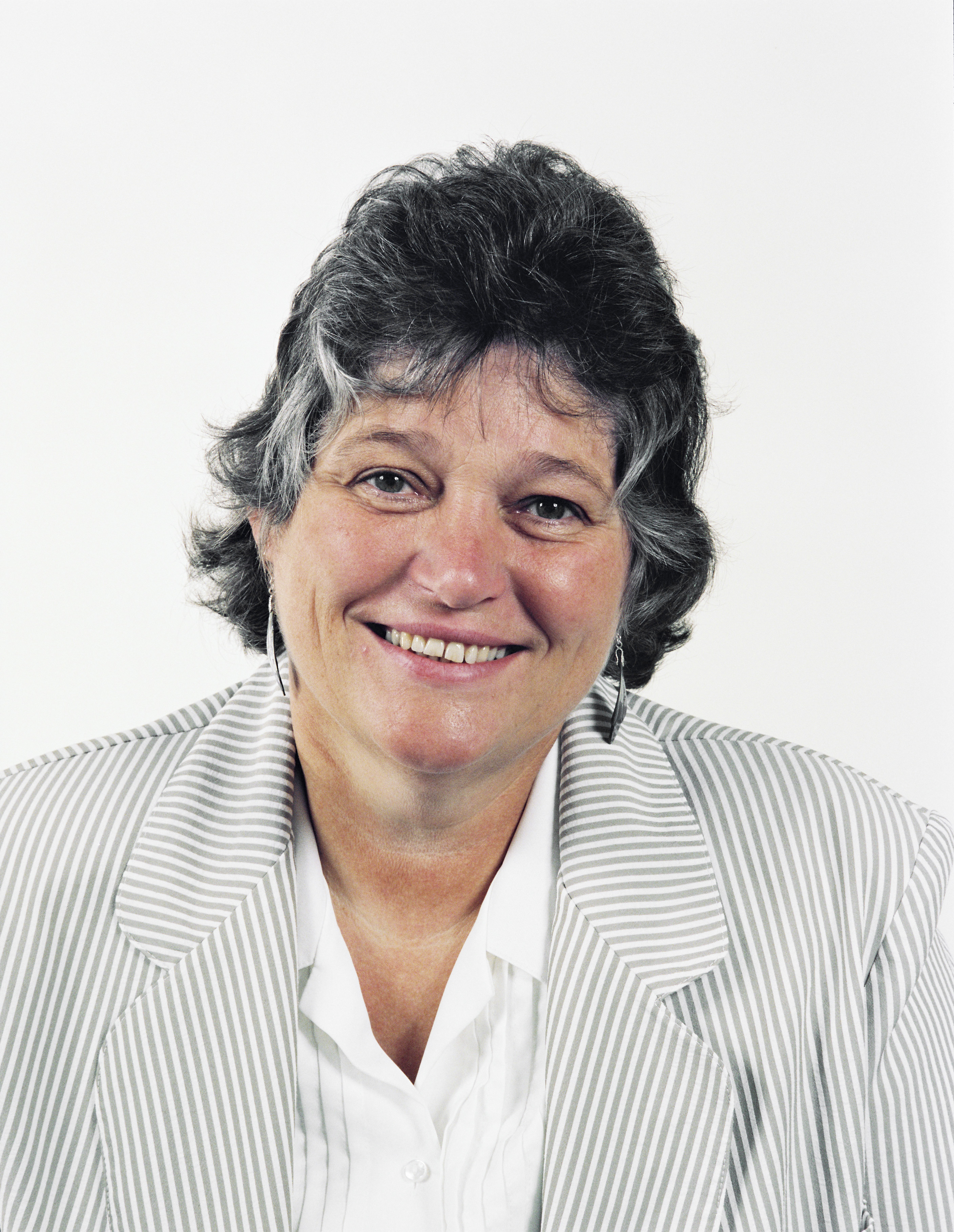

Member of the European Parliament for East Midlands
- In office 10 June 1999 – 10 June 2004
- Preceded by: New constituency
- Succeeded by: Derek Clark

Member of the European Parliament for Nottingham and Leicestershire North West
- In office 9 June 1994 – 10 June 1999
- Preceded by: Ken Coates
- Succeeded by: Constituency abolished

Member of the European Parliament for Leicester
- In office 15 June 1989 – 9 June 1994
- Preceded by: Fred Tuckman
- Succeeded by: Sue Waddington

Personal details
- Born: Imelda Mary Read
- Party: Labour
- Education: University of Leeds

Imelda Mary Read (born 8 January 1939), known as Mel Read, is a British politician who served in the European Parliament.

== Early life ==
Read was educated at Bishopshalt Grammar School and the University of Nottingham, before becoming a laboratory technician, then an employment officer, and a lecturer at Trent Polytechnic, and worked with the Association of Scientific, Technical and Managerial Staffs.

== Parliamentary career ==
At the 1979 general election, she stood unsuccessfully for the Labour Party in Melton, and at the 1983 general election, she was unsuccessful in North West Leicestershire.

Read became an MEP in 1989, representing first Leicester and then Nottingham and Leicestershire North West until 1999. She served as a quaestor for part of this period. From 1999, she represented the enlarged seat of the East Midlands.

She stood down at the 2004 European election, at which time she was elected as President of the European Cervical Cancer Association. Read then resigned from the role in 2008
