= Sewell Park Academy =

Secondary school in Norwich, Norfolk, England

Location
- St Clements Hill; Norwich, Norfolk, NR3 4BX; England; 52°38′49″N 1°17′52″E

Information
- Type: Academy
- Established: 1929
- Local authority: Norfolk
- Trust: Boudica Schools Trust
- Department for Education URN: 142058 Tables
- Ofsted: Reports
- Headteacher: David Day
- Gender: Coeducational
- Age: 11 to 16
- Enrollment: 523
- Capacity: 750
- Colours: Black, white, red and green
- Website: http://www.sewellpark.org

Sewell Park Academy is a secondary school located on the north-eastern edge of the city of Norwich, Norfolk, England.

== Admissions ==
It has approximately 481 students aged eleven to sixteen (years 7 to 11). It is situated between St. Clements Hill and Constitution Hill (B1150), east of New Catton. On the school grounds is the Sewell Barn Theatre. The name of the school comes from Philip Sewell, the brother of Anna Sewell, the author of Black Beauty.

== History ==
=== Grammar school ===
It was The Blyth School, a grammar school, which was built in 1929 in grounds owned by Philip Sewell, who died in 1906. It was named after Ernest Egbert Blyth. It had 750 girls in the early 1950s, 800 by 1956, 850 in 1964 and 800 in 1969. It was administered by the Norwich Education Committee. Two whalebones were given to the school by a former pupil and made into an arch.

=== Comprehensive ===
In 1970, it had its first non-selected intake of girls, then in 1971 it had its first co-educational intake the school having 920 boys and girls, and in 1972, the starting age rose to 12 when the education system in Norwich went comprehensive. The Angel Road Girls' Secondary School and the Alderman Jex Boys' Secondary School became the ages 11–16 Jex Comprehensive School in 1971. It then merged with the Blyth School to become the ten-form entry Blyth Jex School in 1972. administration went to Norfolk Education Committee in April 1974. Mrs Valerie Glauert was the headmistress who oversaw the transformation, and responsible for development of the theatre.

The school was renamed Sewell Park College in September 2008 following a multimillion-pound building project to house the school on one site (the West site) opposed to the two sites at the time. The starting age returned to 11.

=== Academy ===
In September 2015 the school converted to academy status and was renamed Sewell Park Academy.

In March 2016 the school published a projection of a £517,000 deficit in 2016–17, rising to £1.9 million in 2018–19, and started a consultation over staff redundancies. The school had 761 pupils before it became an academy, but this is expected to fall to about 500 in September 2016.

== Sewell Sixth ==
Sewell Park re-launched its own Sixth Form in September 2012 following a period in a consortium with two other local schools.

The Sixth Form was known as the Sewell Sixth. It was not viable.

The sixth form was proposed for closure in May 2015. It closed at the end of August so 1 September 2015, when it transitioned to a trust, it was an 11-16 school, with a year 13, completing the courses they had started.

== Notable former teachers ==
- Dr Tony Chater, Editor from 1974 to 1995 of the Morning Star, taught chemistry at the girls' grammar school from 1959 to 1960

== Notable former pupils ==
=== The Blyth School ===
- Susan Waddington, Labour MEP for Leicester from 1994 to 1999, now at NIACE
- Jillian Beardwood, mathematician
- JaackMaate, YouTuber and host of JaackMaate's Happy Hour Podcast
