= Nottingham and Leicestershire North West (European Parliament constituency) =

Former European Parliament constituency

- European Parliament constituency
- Boundary within the East Midlands (1994-1999)
- Member state: United Kingdom
- Created: 1994
- Dissolved: 1999
- MEPs: 1

Prior to its uniform adoption of proportional representation in 1999, the United Kingdom used first-past-the-post for the European elections in England, Scotland and Wales. The European Parliament constituencies used under that system were smaller than the later regional constituencies and only had one Member of the European Parliament each.

The constituency of Nottingham and Leicestershire North West was one of them.

It consisted of the Westminster Parliament constituencies of Bosworth, Gedling, North West Leicestershire, Nottingham East, Nottingham North, Nottingham South, and Rushcliffe.

== MEPs ==
Elected	Member	Party
1994	Mel Read	Labour
1999	Constituency abolished: see East Midlands	

== Election results ==
European Parliament election, 1994: Nottingham and Leicestershire North West
Party	Candidate	Votes	%	±%
Labour	Mel Read	95,344	49.8	
Conservative	Martin Brandon-Bravo	55,676	29.1	
Liberal Democrats	Andrew M. Wood	23,836	12.4	
Green	Mrs. Sue E. Blount	7,035	3.7	
UKIP	John C. Downes	5,849	3.1	
Independent	Peter J. Walton	2,710	1.4	
Natural Law	Mrs. Julianne Christou	927	0.5	
Majority		39,668	20.7	
Turnout		191,377	37.7	
Labour win (new seat)				
