= Sue Waddington =

Susan Waddington
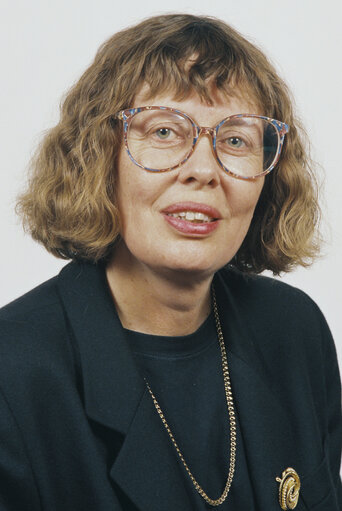

Member of the European Parliament for Leicester
- In office 9 June 1994 – 10 June 1999
- Preceded by: Mel Read
- Succeeded by: Constituency abolished

Personal details
- Born: 23 August 1944 (age 81) Norfolk, England
- Party: Labour

Susan Waddington (born 23 August 1944) is a British education official and Labour Party politician who was Member of the European Parliament for Leicester.

Born in Norfolk, Waddington attended Blyth Grammar School and the University of Leicester. She worked as an adult education field officer, before becoming an assistant director at Derbyshire LEA, and then at Birmingham LEA.

In 1973, Waddington was elected to Leicestershire County Council, serving until 1991, and she was leader of the council from 1982 until 1984. At the 1994 European Parliament election, she was elected to represent Leicester, serving until 1999.

Waddington was president of the European Association for the Education of Adults from 2008 to 2013.

She is currently (2019) councillor for Fosse ward on Leicester City Council and has been an Assistant City Mayor under the elected Mayor of Leicester Peter Soulsby.
