= John Hammersley =

British mathematician

John Hammersley FRS
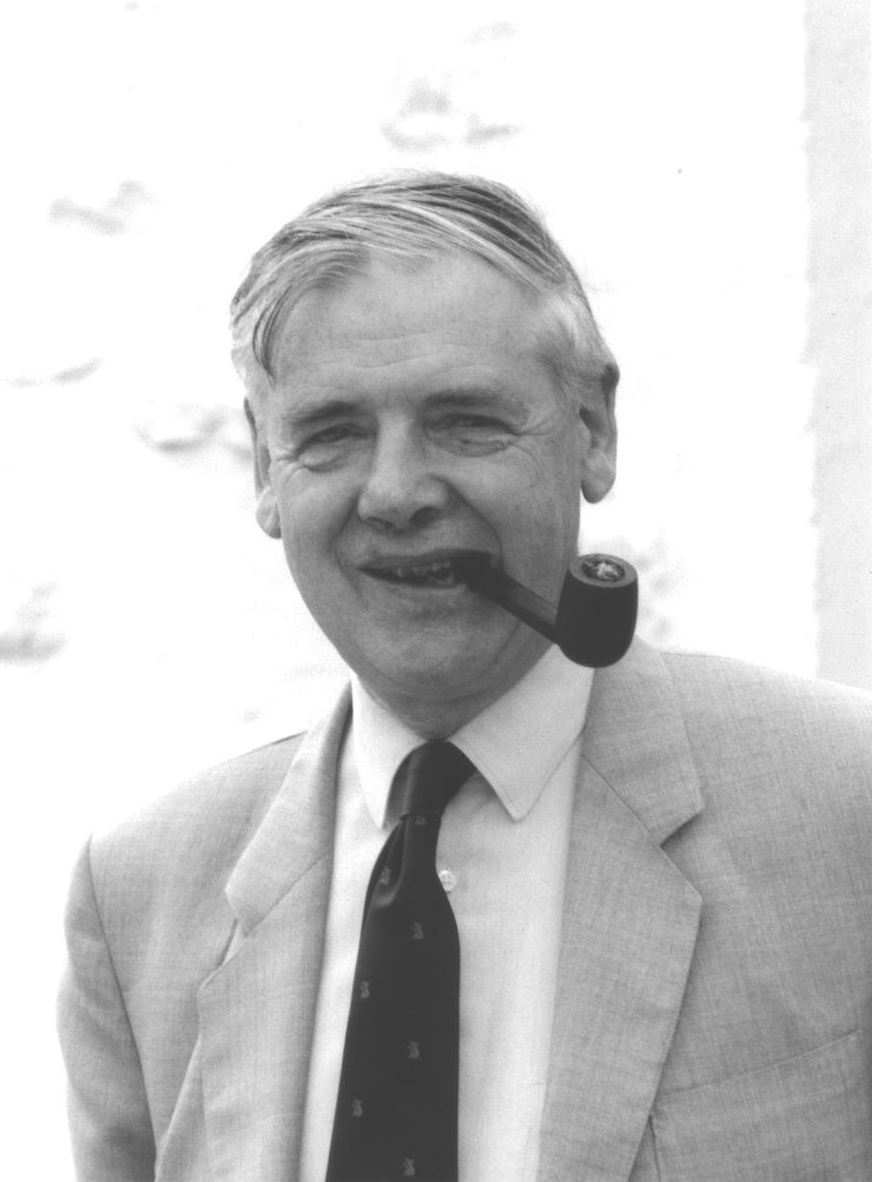
- Born: 21 March 1920; Helensburgh, Dunbartonshire, Scotland
- Died: 2 May 2004 (aged 84)
- Education: Sedbergh School; Emmanuel College, Cambridge
- Awards: FRS (1976); Pólya Prize (1997)
- Scientific career
- Workplaces: University of Oxford; Trinity College, Oxford
- Academic advisors: Unknown
- Doctoral students: Jillian Beardwood; Geoffrey Grimmett; Dominic Welsh

John Michael Hammersley, FRS (21 March 1920 – 2 May 2004) was a British mathematician best known for his foundational work in the theory of self-avoiding walks and percolation theory.

== Early life and education ==
Hammersley was born in Helensburgh in Dunbartonshire, and educated at Sedbergh School. He started reading mathematics at Emmanuel College, Cambridge but was called up to join the Royal Artillery in 1941. During his time in the army he worked on ballistics. He graduated in mathematics in 1948. He never studied for a PhD but was awarded an ScD by Cambridge University and a DSc by Oxford University in 1959.

== Academic career ==
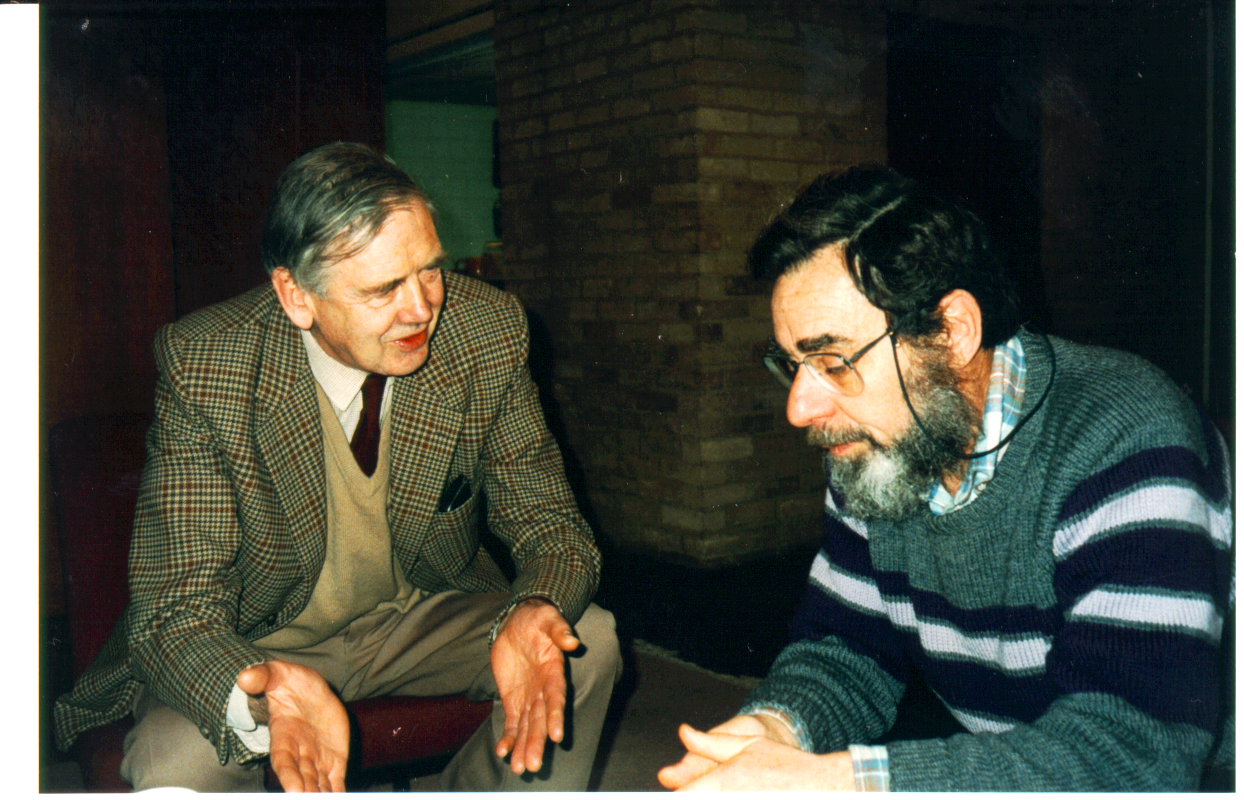
John Hammersley (left) with Harry Kesten in the Mathematical Institute, Oxford University, 1993

With Jillian Beardwood and J.H. Halton, Hammersley is known for the Beardwood-Halton-Hammersley Theorem. Published by the Cambridge Philosophical Society in a 1959 article entitled “The Shortest Path Through Many Points,” the theorem provides a practical solution to the “traveling salesman problem.”

He held a number of positions, both in and outside academia. His book Monte Carlo Methods with David Handscomb was published in 1964. He is known for devising an early solution to the moving sofa problem in 1968.

He was an advocate of problem solving, and an opponent of abstraction in mathematics, taking part in the New Math debate.

He was a fellow (later professorial fellow) of Trinity College, Oxford, from 1961, reader in mathematical statistics at Oxford University from 1969, and elected Fellow of the Royal Society (FRS) in 1976.

== See also ==
- Hammersley set
- Hammersley–Clifford theorem
- Low-discrepancy sequence
