= Mary Wright Sewell =

English poet and children's author (1797–1884)

- Born: 6 April 1797; Sutton, Suffolk, England
- Died: 10 June 1884 (aged 87); Old Catton, Norfolk, England
- Occupation: Poet
- Spouse: Isaac Sewell (m. 1819; died 1878)
- Children: Anna and Philip Sewell

Mary Wright Sewell (/ˈsjuːəl/; 6 April 1797 – 10 June 1884) was an English poet and writer of children's literature. Though popular for writing juvenile bestsellers in her day, she is better known today as the mother of Anna Sewell, the author of Black Beauty.

== Biography ==
Sewell was born on 6 April 1797 in Sutton, Suffolk. Her father, John Wright, and mother Ann Holmes, were farmers and had seven children, of which Sewell was the third. Her upbringing followed the Quaker principles.

Originally taught by governesses at home, Sewell attended boarding school in Tottenham around 1811, while her father had sold his farm to invest in a ship. He was unsuccessful in this enterprise, and by the time she had turned 20, Sewell was forced to become a governess herself at an Essex school.

On 15 June 1819 at Lamas in Norfolk, Sewell married Isaac Sewell, whose parents Quaker elders and the couple settled in Yarmouth. The following year, Sewell's daughter, Anna was born and her son Philip in 1822. Her husband Isaac had a number of ill-advised businesses and he declared himself bankrupt after his son was born.

Isaac would go on to become a travelling salesman, while Sewell herself would teach her children at home. She wrote her first book, Walks with Mamma, using words of only one syllable, to pay for books to educate her children.

The family lived at the Blue Lodge, Wick from 1858 to 1864. She had a great love of poetry and wrote Mother's Last Words (which sold just over a million copies throughout the world) while living at Wick, near Bristol. The book tells a story of how two boys are saved from sin by their mother's last words.

During the 1870s, Sewell nursed her daughter, Anna, through her terminal illness of hepatitis or tuberculosis. During this period she transcribed the dictation of her daughter's only novel, Black Beauty. In 1878, both her daughter and her husband died. Sewell herself died on 10 June 1884 at her home, the White House, Old Catton.

== Works ==
- The children of Summerbrook: scenes of village life, described in simple verse, 1850
- Our Father's care: a ballad, 1857
- Homely ballads for the working man's fireside, 1858
- "Thy poor brother": letters to a friend on helping the poor, 1860
- Mother's last words: a ballad, 1865
- Ballads for children: including "Mother's last words", and "Our father's care", 1867
- An appeal to Englishwomen, 1870
