= Anna Sewell =

English novelist (1820–1878)

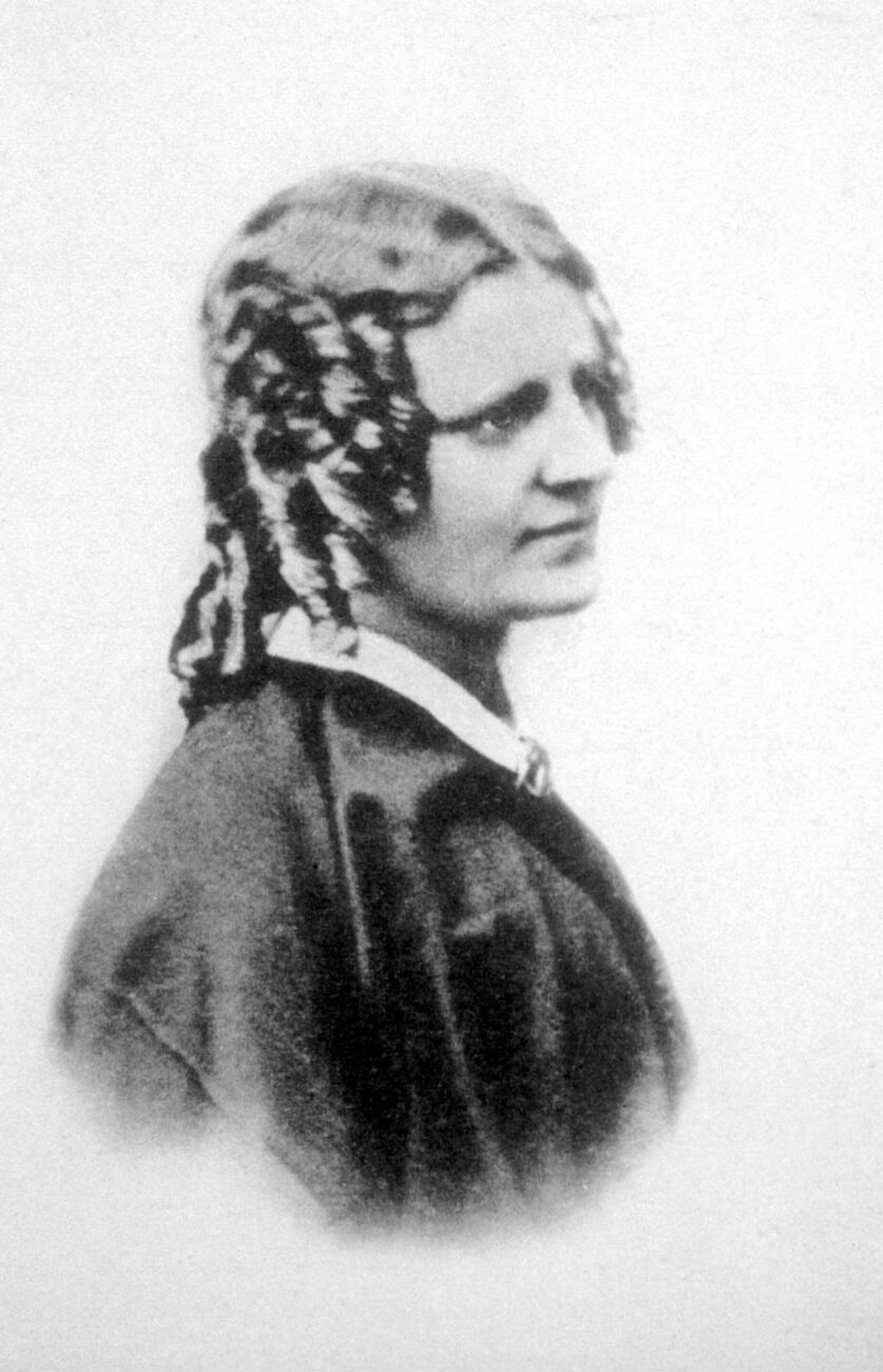
- Born: 30 March 1820; Great Yarmouth, Norfolk, England
- Died: 25 April 1878 (aged 58); Old Catton, Norfolk, England
- Resting place: Quaker burial ground, Lamas
- Occupation: Novelist
- Parent(s): Mary Wright Sewell; Isaac Phillip Sewell
- Writing career
- Period: 19th century
- Genre: Children's literature

Anna Sewell (/ˈsjuːəl/; 30 March 1820 – 25 April 1878) was an English novelist who is known for her only book, Black Beauty, a novel about a horse. She was born into a Quaker family in Norfolk and moved to London as a baby. Her mother, Mary Wright Sewell, was the author of popular children's books. Sewell never married and always lived with her parents, in Sussex, Gloucestershire and Norfolk. A chronic illness left her leading a life of invalidism, with trips to spa resorts in England and continental Europe. She joined her mother in carrying out charitable work and also edited her mother's books. Black Beauty was written between 1871 and 1877 and published a few months before Sewell's death.

== Biography ==
=== Early life ===
Sewell's parents, Mary Wright and Isaac Sewell, were from well-established Quaker families in Norfolk. Mary's family farmed in the area around Norwich, while Isaac's parents ran a large grocery shop in Great Yarmouth. When Mary Wright was twelve years old, her father, John Wright, gave up farming and moved to Great Yarmouth, where he became a partner in a shipping business. The family faced financial hardship after John Wright paid compensation to the victims of a fire on one of his steamboats on the River Yare, and Mary had to work as a teacher in an Essex school for several years. Her brother John Wright inherited the Dudwick Park estate in the village of Buxton near Norwich, and the rest of the family moved into Dudwick Cottage on the estate, where John Wright senior was given a small farm. Mary Wright married Isaac Sewell, who was a partner in a drapery business in Great Yarmouth, on 15 June 1819 at the Quaker Meeting House at Lamas near Buxton. The couple set up home in a small house at 26 Church Plain, Great Yarmouth, where Anna Sewell was born on 30 March 1820.

Soon after Sewell was born, Isaac Sewell's drapery partnership broke up and he went to London to look for work, finding a shop on Camomile Street. His wife joined him in September 1820, after spending six months with her baby on her parents' farm in Buxton. Sewell's only sibling, Philip, was born in January 1822 when the family were living above a drapery shop in Bishopsgate in the City of London. Soon after, the drapery business failed and the family moved to Dalston, which at that time was still a village to the east of London. Isaac Sewell worked first as a commercial traveller and then joined his brother's warehouse business. There was not enough money to send the children to school, and Sewell and her brother were educated by their mother at home. To supplement the family income, Mary Sewell published her first book, Walks with Mamma, or Stories in Words of One Syllable. In the illustrated book, a child called Anne learns about nature and life during walks with her mother. The text contains a message against cruelty to animals, a theme which would later emerge in Sewell's own work. Throughout their childhood, Sewell and her brother spent holidays with their grandparents, uncle and aunts in Buxton. It was there that she learnt to ride and drive horses. Sewell's mother was involved in numerous charitable activities in Dalston, and Sewell often helped her.

In 1832, by which time Isaac Sewell was working in banking with his brother William, the family moved into the converted coach-house of Palatine House in Stoke Newington, a village just north of Dalston. They had the use of a large garden and a meadow in which they kept cows, pigs, rabbits, chickens, ducks and bees. Also living in Stoke Newington with her children was Isaac Sewell's sister Fulleretta Hunton, who had been widowed in 1828, when her husband was convicted of forgery and executed. It was at Stoke Newington that Sewell attended school for the first time. Her life changed at the age of fourteen when, running home from school in the rain, she slipped on wet leaves and fell and sprained her ankle. The injury did not heal and made walking difficult for the rest of her life. Unable to return to school, she spent some time with her mother's relatives in Buxton, where she rode, painted, studied French and visited Great Yarmouth.

=== Adult life ===
In 1836, Sewell moved with her parents and brother to Brighton, where her father had obtained the position of bank manager of the local branch of the newly-founded Surrey, Kent and Sussex Joint Stock Bank. By this time, her mother, influenced by the teachings of family connection Isaac Crewdson had left the Quakers. The family lived in North Street, two doors down from the bank. Sewell and her brother, who worked with his father in the bank, followed their mother in leaving the Quakers and, after a spiritual quest which took them to various chapels and churches in Brighton, settled on St James's Chapel. All three taught at the Sunday School at St James's, and Sewell and her mother did charitable work amongst the poor. By 1839, Sewell had developed a chronic fluctuating illness that left her tired, weak, and in pain. Many physicians were consulted, but were mystified by the condition and no treatment or spa cure was effective. She remained an invalid for the rest of her life.

In 1845, the family moved to the quiet coastal village of Lancing, to the west of Brighton. Philip Sewell, having abandoned plans to be a missionary or a banker, had become a civil engineer and was working on railways in Yorkshire. Miller House in Lancing had some land attached and, for the first time, the family had their own horse, which Sewell was able to ride or drive in a pony-chaise. She used to drive her father to and from the railway station at Shoreham when he commuted to his work in Brighton. Mary Sewell later wrote that it was at this time that Sewell developed her affinity with horses: "[B]etween her and her own horse, and horses in general, a mutual confidence and friendship sprang up, and she learned all their secrets". In 1846, Sewell travelled with her mother, brother and an aunt to a spa in Germany. She continued to visit her relatives in Buxton, and also cousins in Manchester.

After four years in Lancing, Sewell and her parents moved to another Sussex town, Haywards Heath. Her father had abandoned banking for brewing and improved finances allowed them to rent Petlands, a house with large grounds. There was another move, this time to Chichester, in 1853, after Isaac Sewell had given up brewing and returned to banking. Sewell's brother, together with his wife and children, had moved to Santander in Spain to work on the construction of railways. In 1856, Sewell went to Germany and spent nearly a year at a spa in Boppard. She later visited her brother in Spain. In 1858, she moved with her parents to Blue Lodge, on a hill outside the small Gloucestershire village of Abson, where she continued her domestic and charitable work, taught in the village school, and was strong enough to ride. She also helped her mother, who had taken up writing again, by editing her work. Mary Sewell became a successful author, her writing consisting of ballads designed to educate and to encourage Christian behaviour. The first volume, Homely Ballads for the Working Man's Fireside, was published by Smith, Elder & Co in London, while subsequent volumes, including her best-known work, Mother's Last Words, were published by the Norwich company, Jarrold and Sons Ltd. Sewell and her mother also became involved in the temperance movement.

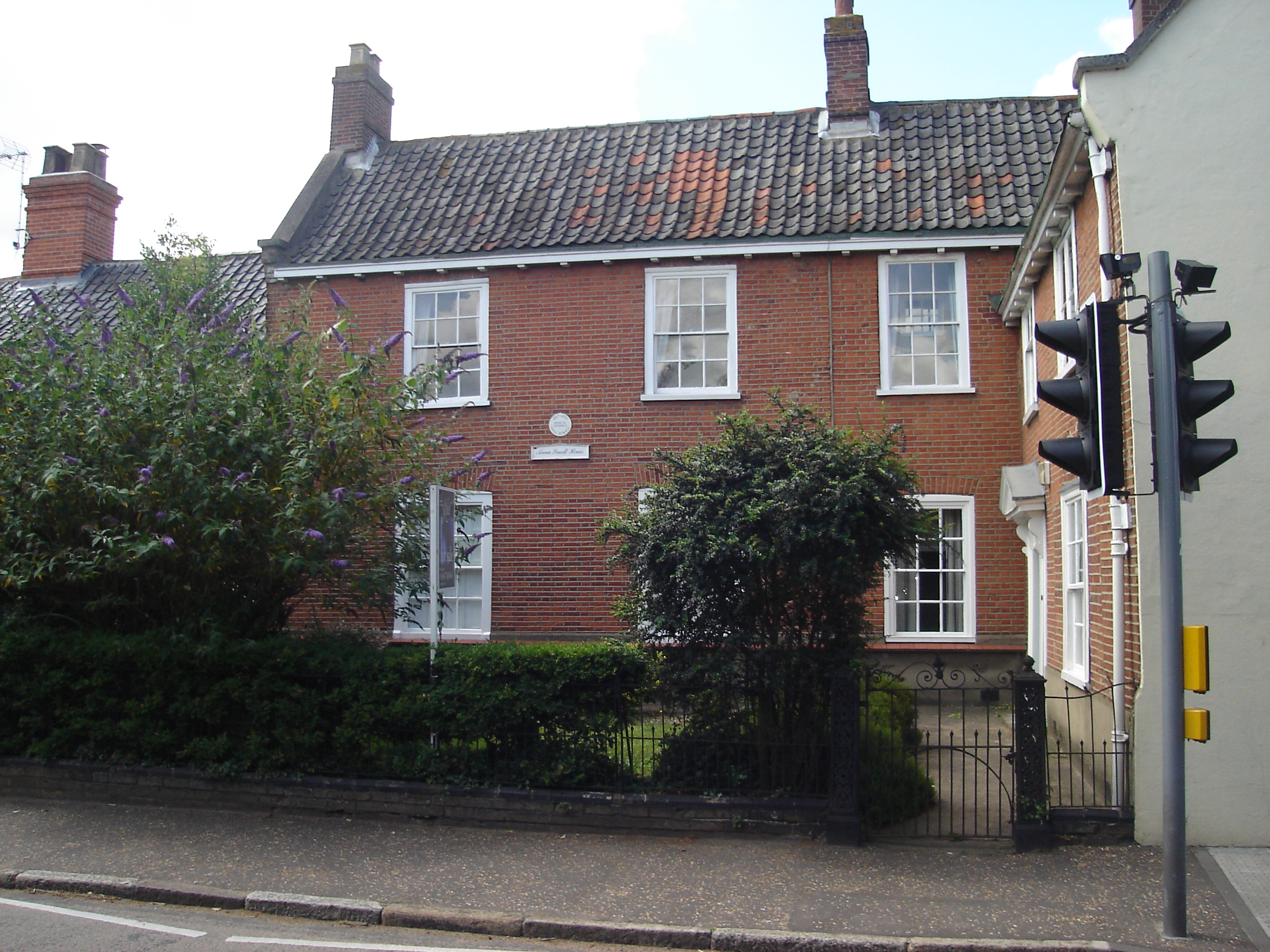
Anna Sewell's home in Old Catton

There was yet another move in 1864, this time to Bath, where Sewell's father had been appointed manager of the local branch of the London and South Western Bank. They spent a few months in a house in Combe Down, before moving into The Moorlands, where there was enough land to keep a few farm animals. The same year, Sewell's brother returned to England with his wife and seven surviving children to live at Clare House in the New Catton area of Norwich and work in Gurney's Bank. Sewell's father was forced to retire from banking in 1865, after it was found that a cashier had been dishonest. In 1866 Sewell’s sister-in-law died, and the following year Sewell and her parents moved back to Norwich to help her widowed brother raise his children. They bought a property, The White House, on Spixworth Road in the village Old Catton, only a mile from Philip Sewell's house and about seven miles from Sewell's uncles and aunts in Buxton. In the years that followed, Sewell was occupied with teaching her nieces and carrying out charitable works with her mother and brother, and visiting friends.

=== Black Beauty ===
Sewell became seriously ill in 1871 and, for the rest of her life, was confined to a bed or sofa except for occasional excursions into the garden. On 6 November 1871, Sewell noted in her diary: "I am writing the life of a horse...", the first mention of Black Beauty. Over the next few years she added to the book by dictating to her mother and, during a period of slightly improved health in 1876-77 completed it by writing notes in pencil, which her mother then transcribed. Sewell said: "I have for six years been confined to the house and to my sofa, and have from time to time, as I was able, been writing what I think will turn out a little book, its special aim being to induce kindness, sympathy, and an understanding treatment of horses". Sewell's mother took the book to her own publishers, Jarrold & Sons in Norwich, and Sewell received a payment of £40 for the copyright. On 21 August 1877, she was sent the first proofs of Black Beauty. The book was published in time for Christmas.

One of the first English novels to be written from the perspective of an animal, the book was published with the title of Black Beauty: His Grooms and Companions. The Autobiography of a Horse, Translated from the Original Equine, by Anna Sewell. The book was intended for the education of working-class men and boys who were responsible for the care of horses, giving advice on equine management, and condemning cruel practices such as the use of bearing reins. The text also addressed moral behaviour, preaching, for example, against the dangers of alcohol and dishonesty. On publication in November 1877, Black Beauty received positive reviews and an edition for schools was soon in preparation.

=== Death ===
Sewell lived just long enough to enjoy the book's early success. She died on 25 April 1878, aged 58. Her doctor had diagnosed her final illness as tuberculosis and hepatitis. She was buried on 30 April 1878 at the Quaker burial ground in Lamas near Buxton. Sewell's father, who had been mentally and physically frail for several years, died on 7 November 1878. Her mother died aged 87 on 10 June 1884.

In her will, Sewell left £20 to be given to the poor and 19 guineas to be given to each of two female friends and her cousin James Hunton. The rest of her property, consisting of shares in a bank, and railway and water works bonds, was to be held in trust with the income going to her parents during their lifetimes and then to be divided between her nephews and nieces.

In 1984, the site of Sewell's grave, and those of other members of her family, in the burial ground of the former Quaker Meeting House in Lammas was bulldozed by the private owners of the property. After protests by local residents, the gravestones of Sewell, her parents, and maternal grandparents were restored and set into a wall outside the old Meeting House.

== Legacy ==
In its first year of publication Black Beauty sold 12,000 copies; by 1890 it had sold over 100,000 copies in Britain. The book was promoted in the United States by George Thorndike Angell, founder of the American Humane Education Society. Translated into many languages, an estimated 40 million copies of the book had been sold by 1995.

Sewell's birthplace in Church Plain, Great Yarmouth, is leased by Redwings Horse Sanctuary. The Grade II property is used to showcase the work of the horse sanctuary as well as the story of Black Beauty. In 1930 the house had been bought by local historian Harry Beale Johnson and restored with the help of architect A. W. Ecclestone, using material from houses demolished in the Great Yarmouth Rows. The house was used for various purposes, including a charity headquarters and a tea-shop, before being leased by Redwings and opened to the public in 2022.

The White House in Spixworth Road, Old Catton, where Sewell wrote Black Beauty is now a private residence known as Anna Sewell House. Although the house in Dudwick Park was demolished, Dudwick Cottage, where Anna stayed with her grandparents and learnt to ride, still exists.

A memorial fountain to Sewell is located at the junction of Constitution Hill and St. Clement's Hill in Norwich, which also marks the entrance to Sewell Park, once part of the estate of Sewell's brother. The fountain was placed in 1917 by Sewell's niece Ada Sewell. The Sewell Barn Theatre, in the grounds of Sewell Park Academy, is a conversion of the barn where Philip Sewell's horse Black Bess, the inspiration for Black Beauty, was stabled.

The Anna Sewell memorial fountain and horse trough outside the public library in Ansonia, Connecticut, was donated by Caroline Phelps Stokes, a philanthropist known for her work supporting animal welfare, in 1892. In 2020, a street on the Keepers Green Estate in Chichester, West Sussex, was named Anna Sewell Way.
