= Great Yarmouth Row Houses =

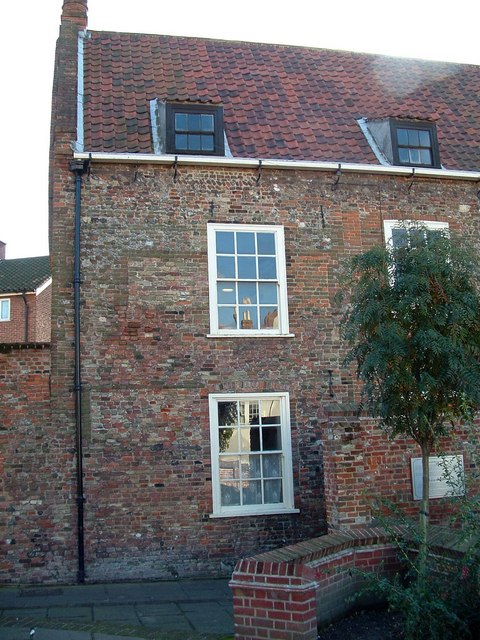

- Location within Norfolk

General information
- Type: House
- Location: South Quay, Great Yarmouth, NR30 2RG
- Coordinates: 52.6034°N 1.7270°E
- Completed: early 17th century
- Owner: Managed by English Heritage and Great Yarmouth Borough Council

Website
- English Heritage website

Great Yarmouth Row Houses were wealthy merchants' residences located on South Quay in the town of Great Yarmouth in the English county of Norfolk. Originally built as one family's dwelling, the properties were later sub-divided into tenements and became part of the town's distinctive "Rows"', a network of narrow alleyways linking Yarmouth's three main thoroughfares. Many "Row Houses" were damaged by Second World War bombing or demolished during post-war clearances. These two surviving properties have been preserved to show the different characteristics of the dwellings over various stages in their history. The Row Houses are under the management and care of English Heritage.

== See also ==
- Great Yarmouth
