= Frederick Tuckman =

British politician (1922–2017)

Frederick Tuckman OBE
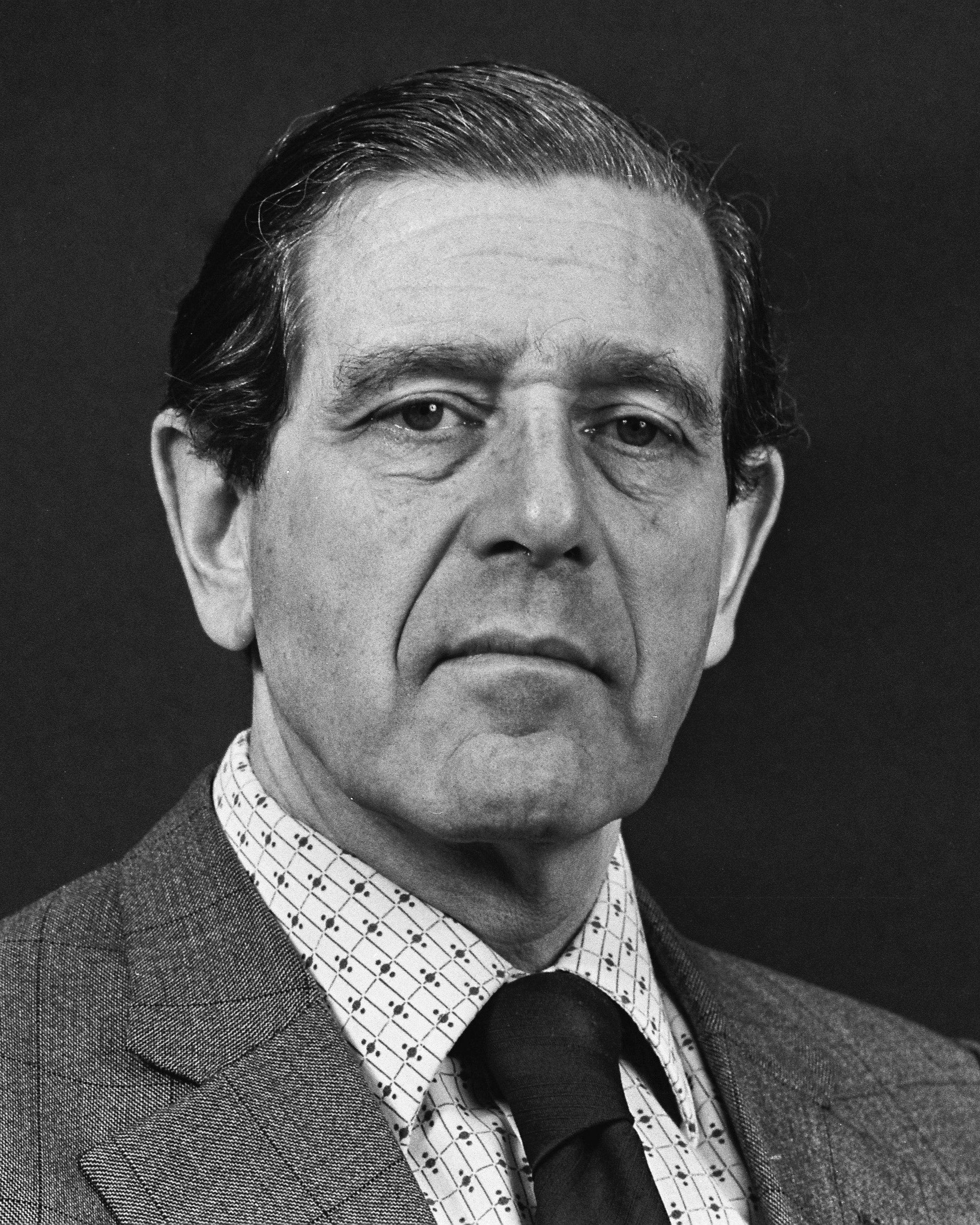

Member of the European Parliament for Leicester
- In office 1979–1989

Personal details
- Born: 9 June 1922 Magdeburg
- Died: 6 July 2017 (aged 95)
- Party: Conservative

Frederick Augustus Tuckman OBE (9 June 1922 – 6 July 2017) was a British Conservative Party politician who served as a Member of the European Parliament (MEP) from 1979 to 1989.

== Early life ==
Friedrich August Tuchmann was born in Magdeburg, Germany. He came from a wealthy Jewish family, the son of a German father and a British mother. Tuchmann attended Landschulheim Herrlingen from 1934 until 1938. In March 1939, he relocated to London, where he stayed with an uncle in Hampstead and went to Pitman's College.

Tuchmann was naturalised as a British citizen and volunteered in 1942 in the Royal Air Force (RAF). He was trained as a radar technician and was later able to work in vocational education. He was demobilised in October 1946 and studied at the London School of Economics (LSE) from 1946 to 1949. In 1949 he changed his name and became Frederick (Fred) Tuckman.

== Career ==
After graduating, Tuckman started his career in business. He worked for Marks & Spencer and in 1965 joined the consulting firm Hay Group. For this company he worked in South Africa, Germany and Finland.

Tuckman was a councillor for the Adelaide ward on the Camden London Borough council from 1968 to 1971.

He fought Coventry North unsuccessfully in 1970. He was elected as MEP for Leicester in 1979 and in 1984 but was defeated in 1989.

He was made an Officer of the Order of the British Empire in the 1990 New Year Honours. He also served as president of the Anglo-Jewish Association (1989–1995).

He died on 6 July 2017, aged 95.
