= Leicester (European Parliament constituency) =

Former European Parliament constituency

- European Parliament constituency
- Boundary within the East Midlands (1979-1984)
- Member state: United Kingdom
- Created: 1979
- Dissolved: 1999
- MEPs: 1

Sources
- United Kingdom Election Results

Prior to its uniform adoption of proportional representation in 1999, the United Kingdom used first-past-the-post for the European elections in England, Scotland and Wales. The European Parliament constituencies used under that system were smaller than the later regional constituencies and only had one Member of the European Parliament each.

The constituency of Leicester was one of them.

Boundary within the East Midlands (1984-1994)

Boundary within the East Midlands (1994-1999)

== Boundaries ==
1979-1984: Carlton, Leicester East, Leicester South, Leicester West, Melton, Newark, Rushcliffe.

1984-1994: Bosworth, Leicester East, Leicester South, Leicester West, Loughborough, North Warwickshire, Nuneaton, Rutland and Melton.

1994-1999: Harborough, Leicester East, Leicester South, Leicester West, Loughborough, Rutland and Melton, Stamford and Spalding.

== Members of the European Parliament ==
Elected	Name	Party
1979	Fred Tuckman	Conservative
1989	Mel Read	Labour
1994	Susan Waddington	Labour
1999	Constituency abolished: see East Midlands	

== Elections ==
European Parliament election, 1979: Leicester
Party	Candidate	Votes	%	±%
Conservative	Frederick Tuckman	91,675	55.1	
Labour	Rev. K. F. Middleton	57,811	34.7	
Liberal	G. G. Watson	17,027	7.9	
Majority		33,864	20.4	
Turnout		166,513	32.5	
Conservative win (new seat)				

European Parliament election, 1984: Leicester
Party	Candidate	Votes	%	±%
Conservative	Frederick Tuckman	72,508	41.4	−13.7
Labour	P. A. Soulsby	69,616	39.8	+5.1
SDP	David N. Simmons	29,656	16.9	+9.0
Ind. Conservative	A. G. Barrett	3,249	1.9	New
Majority		2,892	1.6	
Turnout		175,029	31.0	
Conservative hold		Swing		

European Parliament election, 1989: Leicester
Party	Candidate	Votes	%	±%
Labour	Mel Read	90,798	42.6	+2.8
Conservative	Frederick Tuckman	75,476	35.4	−6.0
Green	Christopher J. Davies	33,081	15.5	New
Ind. Conservative	A. G. Barrett	6,996	3.3	+1.4
SLD	George W. Childs	6,791	3.2	−13.7
Majority		15,322	7.2	N/A
Turnout		213,142	36.8	+5.8
Labour gain from Conservative		Swing		

European elections 1994: Leicester
Party	Candidate	Votes	%	±%
Labour	Susan Waddington	87,048	44.9	+12.0
Conservative	Andrew Marshall	66,764	34.4	−13.8
Liberal Democrats	Mark D. Jones	28,890	14.9	−2.9
Green	Geoff Forse	8,941	4.6	−10.9
Natural Law	Ms. Patricia A. Saunders	2,283	1.2	New
Majority		20,284	10.5	
Turnout		193,926	37.6	
Labour hold		Swing		
