= Black Beauty =

1877 novel by Anna Sewell

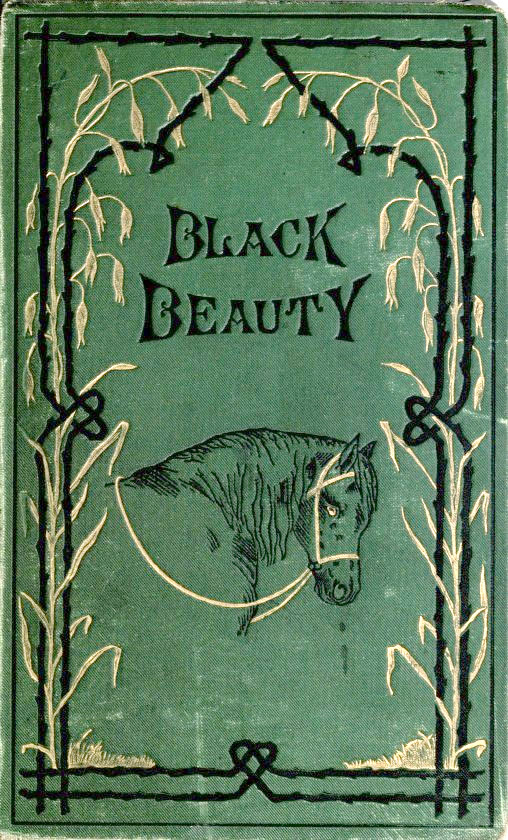
- First edition, Jarrold and Sons, London
- Author: Anna Sewell
- Language: English
- Genre: Children's literature
- Publisher: Jarrold & Sons
- Publication date: 24 November 1877
- Publication place: United Kingdom
- Pages: 255
- Text: Black Beauty at Wikisource

Black Beauty: His Grooms and Companions, the Autobiography of a Horse is an 1877 novel by English author Anna Sewell. It was written from a horse as main character's perspective. She wrote it in the last years of her life, during which she was bedridden and seriously ill. The novel became an immediate best-seller, with Sewell dying just five months after its publication, but having lived long enough to see her only novel become a success. With over fifty million copies sold, Black Beauty is one of the best-selling books of all time.

While forthrightly teaching animal welfare, it also teaches how to treat people with kindness, sympathy, and respect. In 2003, the novel was listed at number 58 on the BBC's survey The Big Read. It is seen as a forerunner of the pony book genre.

== Background ==
Anna Sewell was born in Great Yarmouth, England, and had a brother named Philip, who was an engineer in Europe. At the age of 14, Anna fell while walking home from school in the rain and injured both ankles. Through the mistreatment of the injury, she became unable to walk or stand for any length of time for the rest of her life. Disabled and unable to walk, she began learning about horses, spending many hours driving her father to and from the station from which he commuted to work. Her dependence on horse-drawn transportation fostered her respect for horses. Sewell's introduction to writing began in her youth when she helped edit the works of her mother, Mary Wright Sewell (1797–1884), a deeply religious, popular author of juvenile best-sellers.

Anna Sewell never married or had children. In visits to European spas, she met many writers, artists, and philanthropists. Her only book was Black Beauty, written between 1871 and 1877 in her house at Old Catton. During this time, her health was declining, and she could barely get out of bed. Her mother often had to help her with her illness. She sold the book to the local publishers, Jarrold & Sons. The book broke records for sales and is the "sixth best seller in the English language." By telling the story of a horse's life in the form of an autobiography and describing the world through the eyes of the horse, Anna Sewell broke new literary ground.

Sewell died of hepatitis or tuberculosis on 25 April 1878, only five months after the novel was published, but she lived long enough to see its initial success. She was buried on 30 April 1878 in the Quaker burial-ground at Lammas near Buxton, Norfolk, where a wall plaque marks her resting place. Her birthplace in Church Plain, Great Yarmouth, is now a museum.

Although Black Beauty is looked at as a children's novel, Sewell did not write the novel for children. She said that her purpose in writing the novel was "to induce kindness, sympathy, and an understanding treatment of horses"—an influence she attributed to an essay on animals she read earlier by Horace Bushnell (1802–1876) entitled "Essay on Animals". Her sympathetic portrayal of the plight of working animals led to a vast outpouring of concern for animal welfare and is said to have been instrumental in the abolition of the cruel practice of using the checkrein (or "bearing rein", a strap used to keep horses' heads high, fashionable in Victorian England but painful and damaging to a horse's neck). Black Beauty also mentions the use of blinkers on horses, concluding that this use is likely to cause accidents at night due to interference with "the full use of" a horse's ability to "see much better in the dark than men can."

== Plot summary ==
The story is narrated in the first person as an autobiographical memoir told by the titular horse named Black Beauty—beginning with his carefree days as a foal on an English farm with his mother, known as Duchess, to his difficult life pulling cabs in London, to his happy retirement in the country. Along the way, he meets with many hardships and recounts many tales of cruelty and kindness. Each short chapter recounts an incident in Black Beauty's life containing a lesson or moral typically related to the kindness, sympathy, and understanding treatment of horses, with Sewell's detailed observations and extensive descriptions of horse behaviour lending the novel a good deal of verisimilitude.

The book describes conditions among London horse-drawn cab drivers, including the financial hardship caused to them by high licence fees and low, legally fixed fares. A page footnote in some editions says that soon after the book was published, the difference between 6-day cab licences (not allowed to trade on Sundays) and 7-day cab licences (allowed to trade on Sundays) was abolished and the cab licence fee was much reduced.

== Genre ==
Black Beauty is considered to be one of the first fictional animal autobiographies. Originally meant to be informative literature read by adults on the norms of horse cruelty and preventions of these unjust acts, Black Beauty is now seen as a children's book. Narrated by the main character, Black Beauty, the novel is read by thousands of children worldwide.

== Analysis ==
Sewell uses anthropomorphism in Black Beauty. The text advocates the fairer treatment of horses in Victorian England. The story is narrated from Black Beauty's perspective and resultantly readers arguably gained insight into how horses suffered through their use by human beings with restrictive technical objects like the "bearing rein" and "blinkers" as well as procedures like cutting off the tails of the horses. For instance, Ginger describes the physical effects of the "bearing rein" to Black Beauty, by stating, "it is dreadful... your neck aching until you don't know how to bear it... its hurt my tongue and my jaw and the blood from my tongue covered the froth that kept flying from my lips". Tess Coslett highlights that Black Beauty's story is structured in a way that makes him similar to those he serves. The horses in the text have reactions as well as emotions and characteristics, like love and loyalty, which are similar to those of human beings. Coslett emphasizes that, while Black Beauty is not the first book written in the style of an animal autobiography, it is a novel that "allows the reader to slide in and out of horse-consciousness, blurring the human/animal divide". Dwyer suggests that "by the end of the nineteenth century the concern for animal welfare was often mediated by considerations of utility", implying that these animals (horses) were seen to get the job done by any means rather than the approach that they could be demonizing the animal.

== Publications ==
Published in 1877, in the last years of Anna Sewell's life, Black Beauty sold over 50 million copies worldwide in 50 different languages. This different viewpoint sparked people's interest to speak for horses' well-being and implement legislation. According to Sewell, providing information was her original goal of horse injustice. Although the shift of perspectives was seen as good for some, it was also an issue to others including horse owners and people who sold such equipment for horses (equipment like blinders). It has been alleged that Black Beauty was banned in some countries, e.g. South Africa, for containing the words "Black" and "Beauty" during its apartheid restrictions on African natives. However, Claire Datnow, in her memoir Behind the Walled Garden of Apartheid: Growing up White in Segregated South Africa, writes that this "fact" was a standing joke among her circle of friends, invented to make fun of the "ignorance of the censors"—the idea being that Black Beauty had been banned "because the censors thought it referred to a black woman."

== Reception ==
Upon publication of the book, many readers related to the pain of the victimized horses, sympathized and ultimately wanted to see the introduction of reforms that would improve the well-being of horses. Two years after the release of the novel, one million copies of Black Beauty were in circulation in the United States. In addition, animal rights activists would habitually distribute copies of the novel to horse drivers and to people in stables. The depiction of the "bearing rein" in Black Beauty spurred so much outrage and empathy from readers that its use was not only abolished in Victorian England, but public interest in anti-cruelty legislation in the United States also grew significantly. The arguably detrimental social practices concerning the use of horses in Black Beauty inspired the development of legislation in various states that would condemn such abusive behaviours towards animals. The impact of the novel is still very much recognized today. Writing in the Encyclopedia of Animal Rights and Animal Welfare, Bernard Unti calls Black Beauty "the most influential anti-cruelty novel of all time". Comparisons have also been made between Black Beauty and the most important social protest novel in the United States, Uncle Tom's Cabin, by Harriet Beecher Stowe, on account of the strong degree of outrage and protest action that both novels triggered in society.

== Characters ==
=== Horses ===
- Darkie (Black Beauty)/Black Auster/Jack/Blackie/Old Crony: The narrator of the story, a handsome black horse. He begins his career as a carriage horse for wealthy people but when he "breaks his knees" (i.e. develops scars on the fronts of his wrist (carpal) joints after a bad fall) he is no longer considered presentable enough and is put to much harder work. He passes through the hands of a series of owners, some cruel, some kind. He always tries his best to serve humans despite the circumstances.
- Duchess (nicknamed "Pet"): Beauty's and Rob Roy's mother, who encourages Beauty to be good from a young age.
- Rob Roy: A fellow black horse from Beauty's original farm, who is killed in a hunting incident (along with his rider, Squire Gordon's only son). It is later learned that he was Beauty's half-brother, an older son of Duchess.
- Lizzie: A high-strung, nervous mare whom Lady Anne rides one day and is spooked until Black Beauty comes to her aid with his rider.
- Ginger: A companion of Beauty's at Birtwick Park, she is named for her chestnut colour and her habit of biting, which is often how the spice, ginger, is described. Ginger is a more aggressive horse due to her traumatic upbringing. After being ridden by Lord George in a steeplechase her back is strained. Beauty and Ginger meet for the last time as broken-down cab horses in London, and later a cart carrying a dead horse (whom Beauty believes is Ginger), passes by Beauty.
- Merrylegs: A short, dappled grey, handsome pony who is polite to humans and horses alike. He is ridden by the young daughters at Birtwick Park, then sent to live with a vicar who promises never to sell him.
- Sir Oliver: An older horse whose tail was docked, to his great annoyance and discomfort.
- Rory: A job horse usually paired with Black Beauty. Became a coal carting horse after getting hit in the chest by a cart driven on the wrong side of the road.
- Peggy: A hired horse who cannot run very fast due to her short legs. She runs at an odd hopping pace between a trot and a canter when expected to keep pace with other horses at a fast trot. When paired with a faster horse to pull a carriage she often gets whipped for not keeping up. Sold to two ladies who wanted a safe horse.
- Unnamed young horse: paired with Beauty after Peggy leaves. Often frightened by things he cannot see as he does not know whether they are dangerous or not.
- Captain: A former army horse who witnessed horrific incidents in the Crimean War, although he was well treated and received no serious wounds. He lost his beloved master in the Charge of the Light Brigade. He became a cab-horse for Jerry, where he works with Black Beauty. After a penetrating shoulder injury from a carriage pole due to a collision with a carriage whose driver was drunk, Jerry has him shot rather than send him to work as a cart-horse.
- Hotspur: A five-year-old horse bought to replace Captain. Jerry sells him to Grant when he leaves London.
- Justice: A calm peaceful horse that Beauty meets at Birtwick Park.

=== Beauty's owners ===
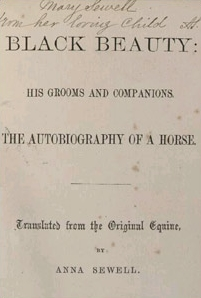
This copy of the first edition of the book was dedicated by the author to her mother. It was auctioned off at Christie's in London in June 2006 for £33,000.

==== Part 1 ====
- Farmer Grey: Beauty's first owner, a good kind man who trains him well.
- Mr. Douglas Gordon (Squire Gordon): A very kind and loving master who was also the squire. Lives in Birtwick Park. Has to sell Beauty and Ginger when he leaves the country because of his wife's illness.
- Mr. John Manly: Black Beauty's groom at Squire Gordon's.
- Mr. James Howard: John Manly's assistant at Squire Gordon's. He leaves to work as a coachman for Sir Clifford Williams.
- Mr. Joseph Green (Joe): A kind boy who replaces James at Squire Gordon's hall. Beauty becomes seriously ill after little Joe gives Beauty a pail of cold water to drink and then assumes Beauty does not need a blanket, all after a long, exhausting gallop.
- Bill: A boy who keeps thrashing and whipping a pony to attempt to make him jump a fence.
- Mrs. Bushby: Bill's mother who is worried when she hears that he fell into a bush.

==== Part 2 ====
- Earl of W: Purchases Beauty and Ginger from Squire Gordon. Lives in Earlshall Park.
- Lady W: Wife of Lord W. Demands that Beauty and Ginger wear bearing reins to hold their heads up high. When York tries to comply with Lady W's order Ginger lashes out, kicking everything around her.
- Mr. York: Earl of W's coachman. He treats the horses kindly but is scared to speak for the horses.
- Reuben Smith: A first-rate driver who can treat a horse as well as a farrier, due to spending two years with a veterinary surgeon, and being an ostler at an inn. Unfortunately he occasionally drinks heavily. Though York tries to hide this problem, the Earl finds out and fires Reuben. York later convinces the Earl to rehire him. After taking Colonel Blantyre to town Reuben gets drunk in the White Lion, then rides Beauty back to Earlshall Park. Due to a loose nail in Beauty's shoe, which Reuben was too drunk to care about, Beauty's shoe comes off. Reuben then makes Beauty gallop over sharp stones injuring Beauty's hoof and causing him to stumble. Beauty falls and scrapes his knees, while Reuben is flung off Beauty and dies from a cervical spine fracture.
- Master of the livery stables: Buys Beauty and hires him out to people in Bath who wish to rent a horse. Some of the people who rent Beauty are good drivers, most are not.
- Mr. Barry: Buys Beauty from the livery stables after his friend rents Beauty several times, as his doctor advised him to get more horse exercise. He tries to treat horses well but hires two bad grooms (a thief and a humbug) due to his lack of knowledge on horse care. Decides to sell Beauty at a horse fair.

==== Part 3 ====
- Mr. Jeremiah (Jerry) Barker: A kind owner and religious man who uses Beauty and Captain as cab horses. After Captain is injured he buys Hotspur to replace him. Refuses to work on Sunday or force his horses to go beyond a 'jog-trot' through London for customers with poor timekeeping, although he will break these rules for a good cause. One New Year's Eve, Jerry is kept waiting in blizzard conditions by inconsiderate young men who stayed too long playing cards, contracts bronchitis, and nearly dies. Jerry's doctor tells him he must not return to cab work. Jerry takes a job with Mrs. Fowler as her coachman.
- Mrs. Polly Barker: Wife of Jerry. Always waits up for her husband.
- Mr. Harry Barker: Son of Jerry. Helps his father look after the horses.
- Miss Dorothy (Dolly) Barker: Daughter of Jerry. Often brings food to her father.
- Mr. (Grey / Governor) Grant: a respected and long-serving cab driver. When Jerry is ill he takes out Hotspur and gives Jerry half the money he makes.

==== Part 4 ====
- Corn dealer/baker Steven: Uses Beauty as a workhorse. Works him fairly but due to the poor lighting in Beauty's stable Beauty nearly goes blind.
- Foreman: Has Beauty overloaded so that fewer journeys are required to deliver goods.
- Mr. Jakes: A carter who works for the baker. Dislikes overloading Beauty but cannot go against the foreman. Makes Beauty work with the bearing rein up until a lady shows him that Beauty would find it easier to pull the cart without the bearing rein.
- Mr. Nicholas Skinner: A ruthless cab-horse owner who charges a high fee for renting cab horses. As a result, the only way the drivers who rent his horse can make money is by overworking the horse, usually by whipping the horse to make it move even when tired. When Beauty collapses from overwork, Skinner plans to send Beauty to a knacker but a farrier convinces him to rest Beauty and sell him at a horse fair. Seedy Sam used to rent horses from him.
- Willie: Grandson of Farmer Thoroughgood who wants to help Black Beauty when he comes to the market with his grandfather.
- Farmer Thoroughgood: A kind owner who cares for Black Beauty when he is at his weakest.
- The three ladies: Beauty's final home, where he spends the rest of his days very well treated. The ladies are Miss Blomefield, Miss Ellen, and Miss Lavinia and are most likely sisters.
- Joseph (Joe) Green: Coachman for the three ladies. Recognizes Beauty as the horse that used to belong to Squire Gordon.

== Film adaptations ==
The book has been adapted into film and television several times, including:

- Your Obedient Servant (1917), directed by Edward H. Griffith
- Black Beauty (1921), directed by Edward H. Griffith
- Black Beauty (1946), directed by Max Nosseck
- Black Beauty (1971), directed by James Hill
- The Adventures of Black Beauty (1972–1974), a TV series produced by London Weekend Television and shown by ITV
- Black Beauty (1978) by Hanna-Barbera
- Black Beauty (1978), a TV miniseries
- Black Beauty (1987) by Burbank Films Australia
- Black Beauty (1994), a film starring Docs Keepin Time
- Black Beauty (2020) by Constantin Film and distributed by Disney+ starring Kate Winslet
- Beyond Black Beauty, a streaming series for Amazon Freevee by Amazon Studios
- Additionally, in 1966 Walt Disney Productions produced an LP adaptation on its Disneyland Records label with music by Disney's musical director at the time, Tutti Camarata, complete with narration and singing by Robie Lester similar to an old-time radio program. Disney never directly made an animated or live-action version, but they did finally purchase the distribution rights to the version listed above.

== Theatrical adaptations ==
- Black Beauty (1998), a musical adaptation with book and lyrics by Mindi Dickstein and music by Daniel Messé
- Black Beauty Live (2011), adapted by James Stone and directed by Chris Ford

Black Beauty was adapted for the stage in 2011 by playwright James Stone. The play was performed at the Broughton Hall Estate, North Yorkshire and Epsom Racecourse, Surrey. The production was a critical success and was performed around the UK in 2012.

== Influence upon other works ==
- Beautiful Joe was a best-selling 1893 novel about a dog, which was directly influenced by Black Beauty and followed a similar path to fame through awareness of cruelty to animals.
- The Strike at Shane's: A Prize Story of Indiana is an anonymous American novel which won a monetary award and national publication in 1893 in a contest sponsored by the American Humane Society, and was reprinted several times commercially thereafter. Described in the introduction as a "Sequel to Black Beauty", it tells the story of good and bad treatment of farm animals and local wildlife, especially songbirds, in the America Midwest. The novel is generally attributed as the first published work of the novelist Gene Stratton-Porter, and bears a remarkable textual similarity to her other books.
- One of the most popular of the interwar pony stories for children, Moorland Mousie (1929), by "Golden Gorse" (Muriel Wace), is heavily influenced by Black Beauty.
- Phyllis Briggs wrote a sequel called Son of Black Beauty, published in 1950.
- The Pullein-Thompson sisters wrote several stories concerning relatives of Black Beauty. They are "Black Ebony" (1975; by Josephine), "Black Velvet" (1975; by Christine), "Black Princess" (1975; by Diana), "Black Nightshade" (1978; by Josephine), "Black Romany" (1978; by Diana), "Blossom" (1978; by Christine), "Black Piper" (1982; by Diana), "Black Raven" (1982; by Josephine) and "Black Pioneer" (1982; by Christine). The book Black Swift (1991) by Josephine is not about a Black Beauty relative. These were published in several compilations as well as some of them being available separately. Each compilation was subsequently republished, sometimes with a change of name.
- Spike Milligan wrote a parody of the novel called Black Beauty According to Spike Milligan (1996).

== See also ==
- List of fictional horses
- Sewell Park, Norwich
