= Bosco Adventure =

Japanese anime television series

- ボスコアドベンチャー
- Genre: Adventure; Fantasy
- Based on: Storie del Bosco by Tony Wolf
- Directed by: Taku Sugiyama
- Music by: Toshiyuki Watanabe
- Country of origin: Japan
- Original language: Japanese
- No. of episodes: 26

Production
- Executive producer: Koichi Motohashi
- Producers: Michihiko Suwa (YTV); Masunosuke Ogashi (Dentsu); Shigeo Endo
- Editor: Hajime Okayasu
- Production companies: Yomiuri TV; Dentsu; Nippon Animation

Original release
- Network: NNS (YTV, NTV)
- Release: October 6, 1986 – March 30, 1987

Bosco Adventure (Japanese: ボスコアドベンチャー, Hepburn: Bosuko Adobenchā) is an anime television series produced by Nippon Animation, loosely inspired by the book series Storie del Bosco of the Italian writer Tony Wolf, and other books of this author. The series was popular in Europe in the late 1980s and early 1990s, and was shown in many European countries (Bulgaria, Estonia, France, Germany, Greece, Hungary, Italy, SFR Yugoslavia, Spain, Poland, Russia), America (Canada, Chile, Mexico, ...), and other parts of world like Arab World, Cameroon, Israel and South Korea. It was a big success in France, Italy and Japan, but not famous and was not commercialized in the United Kingdom or United States since they were never released in English. The Japanese DVDs were released in July 2003 and the fully remastered Blu-ray discs in July 2017.

== Plot ==
The story is about the young elvish Princess Apricot (アプリコット ひめ) whose mission is to return to her homecountry of Fountain land before the total solar eclipse. Her homecountry is under the military occupation of forces loyal to a monster called Scorpion (スコーピオン). If Apricot manages to sit on a throne before the eclipse, she will release a great water power that will destroy the occupying forces.

To prevent that from happening, she has been kidnapped by a mysterious cloaked man called Hoodman (フードマン), and his, rather clumsy, aides: Jack (ジャック) and Franz (フランツ). Their mission is to keep Princess Apricot away from her home land until the eclipse. In the first episode, she escapes from the villains by sending a message with her trusty mechanical bird, Speak (スピーク). The Princess's urgent call for help is accidentally heard by inhabitants of Bosco Forest: a brave and adventurous Frog (フローク), intelligent and ingenious inventor Tutty (タッティ), and cowardly, but kind and warm-hearted Otter (オッター). They save her from the villains, and the princess becomes a part of Bosco crew.

The guys decide to help Apricot finding her way back home, before it is too late. On their way to Fountain land they get into myriad of adventures, where they prove their desire and ability to help and protect those who are in need, and where their own relationships between each other flourish and develop into strong friendship and love.

== Characters ==
=== Allies ===
==== Main characters ====
Princess Apricot (アプリコット ひめ)
Voiced by Yuko Minaguchi
Apricot is an elvish princess whose mission is to return home to Fountain land before the total eclipse of the Sun. Her parents were killed by a monster called Scorpion who occupied her homeland. Aboard the Bosco ship, she is at first respected as a real princess, but being humble and considerate, she made clear that she doesn't want the others to call her Princess Apricot, but Apri - a short and convenient nickname which they use until the end. She is the one that encourages friends to help others in trouble, even though it delays their progress. Her character adds a softer and feminine side to the rest of the crew. She is always ready to help with chores and duties aboard Bosco and regularly teams up with Frog to solve the problems they encounter. Apricot and Frog's relationship develops in different way then with Tutty and Otter. As the story goes on, romantic elements are combined with emotions of strong connection between each other, from the first contact on the delta plane, to the very end.
Frog (フローク)
Voiced by Shigeru Nakahara
Frog is a young inhabitant of the Bosco forest. He is the leader of the Bosco crew, even though he denies it. He is good friends with Tutty and Otter. Throughout the episodes, he often fights with Tutty because of the opposite opinions and ideas and Apricot is the one who usually calms them down. He often drives the Bosco ship in dangerous situations and shows his courage and wit whenever it is needed. He gains strong feelings for Apricot.
Tutty (タッティ)
Voiced by Hiroya Ishimaru
Tutty is behind every move of Bosco crew. He is the one who invents all machines, such as the jet-pack, hovercraft, and other accessorizing vehicles, even the Bosco ship, which was used as a house before the saving of the princess. He usually fixes something on his table and he even fixed and upgraded Speak so it could communicate with others. He always has the right idea at the right time.
Otter (オッター)
Voiced by Koichi Yamadera
A bit cowardly and shy, Otter knows how to be useful at the same time. He is the engineer of the Bosco ship, as he lights the fire and keeps it strong in order for Bosco to travel. He spends most of the time aboard in the loft. He usually solves problems together with Tutty. He is a good cook too.

==== Minor characters ====
Speak (スピーク)
Voiced by Hiroko Fukujun
Speak is Apricot's mechanical bird who looks a lot like a toucan, but actually bears resemblance to a parrot because it repeats words spoken to it. Tutty fixes it first time after being hit by lightning, in order to hear Apricot's plea for help, and then for the second time to the point where it could communicate with others instead of repeating words. Speak is very close to Apricot. This character doesn't appear in episodes 4, 5, 6, 7, 11, 14, 15, 16, 20 and 24.
Ender (エンダー)
Voiced by Kôhei Miyauchi
A noble man from Fountain land, Ender appears in episodes 13–21 and 26. He carried the message to Apricot and informed her more about her quest and its utmost importance for the whole planet. He did not get on well with the rest of the crew at the beginning, especially because he could not understand how they called her Apri instead of Apricot, as it showed disrespect towards a royal princess. The tensions diminished as the story moved on, and he helped Frog, Tutty and Otter in many occasions.
Owl (アウル)
Voiced by Kôhei Miyauchi
Wise owl of the Bosco forest, he appears in the first episode when Otter asks him for help with Speak. He appears later in most of episodes with other characters from forest as a part of a short sequence with a small instructive story that was shown at the end of most episodes before the closing titles.
Raby (ラビィ)
Voiced by Naoko Watanabe
Funny rabbit from Bosco forest.
Hedgy (ヘッジィー)
Voiced by Hiroko Emori
Funny hedgehog from Bosco forest.
Crow (クロウ)
Voiced by Masaharu Satō
Funny crow from the Bosco forest.
Jenny (ジェニー)
Voiced by Miki Itou
Another rabbit, also from Bosco forest.
Araiguma (アライグマ)
Voiced by Chieko Honda
Racoon from the Bosco forest.
Kasasagi (カササギ)
Voiced by Kumiko Takizawa
Ornith, Crow's passion, inhabitant of Bosco forest.
Giant (きょじん)
Voiced by Daisuke Gōri
Appears in episode 2, on the Sleepy Giant's mountain.
Mother Dragon (母親)
Voiced by Asami Mukaidono
Appearing in episodes 3, 4, 23, 25 and 26, she inhabits the valley that Bosco crew reaches on their journey to Fountain land. She is peaceful and lives in amity with the citizens of the valley's village. The kidnapping of the Baby Dragon maddens her and for a brief time she becomes an enemy for the Bosco crew until they save the baby from Hoodman.
Baby Dragon (子供)
Voiced by Naoko Watanabe
Appearing in episodes 3, 4, 23, 25 and 26, Baby Dragon gets kidnapped by Jack and Franz and serves as Hoodman's bait for Apricot. In the end, she saves the Baby Dragon and returns him to his mother.
Leon (レオン)
Voiced by Takeshi Aono
Appearing in episodes 8 and 9, he is a ruler of the Oasis.
Pansa (パンサ)
Voiced by Ritsuo Sawa
Leon's counselor, he appears in episodes 8 and 9.
Unicorn (ユニコーン)
Voiced by Hiromi Tsuru
Appearing in episodes 10, 11 and 25, it lives alone on a mysterious deserted island where Bosco gets shipwrecked. With help from Messenger, Hoodman convinces Unicorn that members of the Bosco crew are devils. After Hoodman uses Unicorn solely for his own malicious agenda and leaves it with its leg jammed inside a rock, Apricot and Frog help it and prove that they are not evil.

=== Enemies ===
==== Main characters ====
Hoodman (フードマン)
Voiced by Banjo Ginga
A cloaked man, dressed in black, Hoodman is Scorpion's mercenary. He is Jack's and Franz's boss and the leader of big air ship called after his master - Scorpion. Together with his aides, Hoodman haunts the Bosco ship, which usually twists the episodes' plot. In the beginning he is seen as a fierce, strong and scary leader, but as the story moves on he becomes more euphoric, stressed and devastated, mainly because of his incompetent aides and Damia's intervention later in the series.
Jack (ジャック)
Voiced by Sanji Hase
Jack is Hoodman's cat-like servant who always goes as a team with Franz. He looks fierce, which shows to be misleading as the story develops. He often uses various weapons to attack the Bosco ship, such as bombs, catapults, stone throwers and others.
Franz (フランツ)
Voiced by Kenichi Ogata
Franz is Hoodman's dwarf-like servant and bears certain resemblance to Ender. He drives the Scorpion, and likes to eat a lot.
Damia (ダミア)
Voiced by Rihoko Yoshida
Damia is Scorpion's competent and dangerous second in command. Her first appearance is in episode 15, where she is sent to back up Hoodman and seize the princess after a series of his unsuccessful attempts to do the same. She is a master of disguise and possesses a private army. She generally makes Bosco's progress harder, but from time to time also facilitates it since she gets into fights with Hoodman. Damia is loyal to Scorpion, as he promised her half of the world after she hands Apricot over to him.
Koumori (Messenger) (コウモリ)
Voiced by Hiroshi Ōtake
Messenger is a bat and serves as a bearer of Scorpion's messages to Hoodman. He often gives him ideas to help him catch the princess. He appears for the first time in episode 5.
Scorpion (スコーピオン)
Voiced by Hidekatsu Shibata
Scorpion is a mysterious monster who gained control of Fountain land. He is a monster who feeds on planets and his intention with the present one is to dry it up so that he and his creatures can slowly eat it. His voice appears for the first time in episode 5, and is seen behind the curtain in episode 13, when Hoodman asks for new ship. He appears in the episode 24 in his real shape.
Oja (オージャ)
Voiced by Seizō Katō
Oja is a big lizard who is the chief of the tribe that captures Apricot in episode 13. He appears in the episode 14 when Hoodman tries to exchange kidnapped Apricot for Frog, as Oja's only motive is to eat. Oja agrees, but eventually friends manage to escape the lizard's castle, leaving the lizards' chieftain with an empty stomach.

== Episodes ==
No.	Title	Original release date
1	"The Kidnapped Fairy Princess, Bosco launches!" Transliteration: "Sarawareta yousei no hime - Bosuko gou hasshin!" (Japanese: さらわれた妖精の姫·ボスコ号発進!)	October 6, 1986
Princess Apricot with her loyal bird Speak is kidnapped by Hoodman in his flying ship Scorpion. She manages to send a cry for help by Speak, but unfortunately a thunderbolt hits him. Next morning, somewhere in the Bosco forest, Otter finds the bird and brings it to his friend Tutty who fixes it and the crew manages to hear the princess' message. Tutty's house is a disguised flying ship, so the crew transform it and fly to help the princess, with Speak guiding their way. Two ships meet on open-air territory and princess manages to jump off the Scorpion. Luckily, Frog saves her with a delta plane. Princess tells them her story, and they agree to return her to her home, the Fountain land.
2	"Don't Wake the Sleepy Giant"; Transliteration: "Nemureru kyojin wo okosuna!" (Japanese: 眠れる巨人を起こすな!)	October 13, 1986
Princess is having a dream about her throne disappearing. Later, in the distance, the crew sees the Sleepy Giant's mountain, as Hoodman starts to catapult the Bosco ship. Two ships get carried by a storm, and Bosco starts drifting down the mountain. At one point the ship falls above the sleeping Giant, being held only by an anchor to the rock above. Bosco crew fixes the damage while trying not to wake up the sleeping one. Hoodman finds the ship and starts attacking it. Frog throws ashes in Giant's face which makes him cough and blow away the Bosco ship. Angry Giant then throws a huge rock at Scorpion. Bosco reaches the Dragon's valley.
3	"Dragon Valley is Full of Danger"; Transliteration: "Doragon-dani ha kiken ga ippai" (Japanese: ドラゴン谷は危険がいっぱい)	October 20, 1986
Jack and Franz stole the Dragon's baby. Bosco crew lands in the village and shortly after continues the travel, but not too far away, the Dragon starts attacking them, believing they have her baby. She does some damage to the ship but they manage to run away by turning on the turbo speed system. They crash in a tree near the village, and people welcome them again. That night Hoodman flies over the village and demands the princess in exchange for the little dragon. Apricot feels guilty about it. Tomorrow, Dragon starts destroying the village searching for her baby. Apricot manages to talk quietly with her and the Dragon goes away. Tutty upgrades Speak so he can communicate with others. He goes back to Bosco forest and brings wine to the friends, establishing a connection with the inhabitants of the Bosco forest and the Bosco crew.
4	"Go for it! Baby Dragon"; Transliteration: "Ganbare! Kodomo Doragon" (Japanese: がんばれ!子供ドラゴン)	October 27, 1986
Apricot has a dream again, this time about her mother calling her. She wakes up hearing Dragon crying for her son. After the guys repaired the ship, Apricot steals Tutty's hovercraft and heads to the Northern Swamp, the alleged Hoodman's hideout, as she feels guilty about the disturbed peaceful situation in the village because of her. After finding the Scorpion and climbing onto the ship, Hoodman ties her together with the little dragon. In the meantime, the guys realize that Apricot is missing and they start the ship to look out for her. Back in Scorpion, Apricot finds out that little Dragon blows fire if kissed, so she uses that technique to get them both free. Then, she takes Tutty's jet pack, which Jack and Franz have stolen in the first episode. As Bosco and Scorpion approach one another, princess jumps off the ship with the little Dragon and the jet pack. Soon after that, Dragon comes and burns down the Scorpion, while Apricot jumps to the Bosco ship. Friends say good-bye to people from village and the dragons, with Apricot promising that they will see each other again.
5	"Get your Hands on a Shiny Mushroom!"; Transliteration: "Hikaru kinoko wo te ni irero!" (Japanese: 光るキノコを手に入れろ!)	November 3, 1986
Hoodman's got the Bosco ship on fire, demanding that they give away the princess. Frog and Tutty start arguing because they ran out of wood, and the only source are planks from the Bosco ship. Tutty is strongly against that, since they would basically tear down the ship in that case. After turning on the ventilation system, Bosco ship lands onto river, with Tutty falling in water because of the high impact. At Scorpion, Messenger brings the message to Hoodman from their master, who reminds him of his quest. Then, he orders Jack and Franz to bring him a cold water from the river. Tutty has a strange fever, so Apricot and Frog go to find some cure for him. While talking with villagers they find out that the water from the river is poisonous, which made both Tutty and Hoodman sick. Villagers say that only the shiny mushrooms growing in the depths of Castle of Evil, an infamous and dangerous place, can cure them. Jack and Franz eavesdrop on the conversation, and after informing their master they head out in the underground vehicle to the caves. Apricot and Frog are also in the race, having constructed a special vehicle to set out and find the shiny mushrooms.
6	"The Great Demon Palace's Dead Heat"; Transliteration: "Dai ma kyuu no deddohi-to" (Japanese: 大魔宮のデッドヒート)	November 10, 1986
Apricot and Frog have numerous deadly adventures in the Castle's depths, with Hoodman and his aides on their trail. After great number of obstacles, the paths of the two opponents split up, with Apricot and Frog getting the mushrooms first, as Hoodman's vehicle has fallen in the poisonous water. While getting the mushrooms, Frog accidentally triggers the mechanism that stops the pouring of the black water, which made the river poisonous in the first place. Apricot insists on giving the mushrooms to Hoodman, Jack and Franz, since they got poisoned with water after their vehicle fell in it. Unwillingly, Frog listens to her and they feed the bad guys with the shiny mushrooms.
7	"Princess Apricot in Peril"; Transliteration: "Apurikotto hime kikiippatsu" (Japanese: アプリコット姫 危機一髪)	November 17, 1986
Apricot's mercy wasn't accepted in a good way, as Hoodman kidnaps her and throws Frog into the water. Otter saves Frog after the river brought him back to Bosco ship. They cure Tutty, and start the ship, going in the cave to save the princess. In the meantime, Apricot was running from the villains through the caves. After the guys saved her, together they continue with their travel and Tutty and Frog become friends again.
8	"Hoodman's Strange Magic"; Transliteration: "Fu-doman no okashi na majikku" (Japanese: フードマンのおかしなマジック)	November 24, 1986
Friends reach the desert. Messenger gives the idea to Hoodman on how to catch the princess and the rest of the crew. There is a mechanism that stops the water of Oasis, diverting it into another direction. Hoodman uses it to cheat the people of Oasis how he is a great prophet and that he can make the water disappear and then reappear again. He says that the ship which will soon land in the Oasis has many devils and that they need to be imprisoned. Bosco lands soon after the Hoodman's fraud, and the people from Oasis imprison them, everyone except Otter, as he managed to stay inside the ship in the loft. In the evening he disguised himself and went to help his friends who were kept in the Oasis' dungeon. He finds the big bag full of water, which Hoodman planned to use in his further magic tricks. Jack and Franz meet Otter, who luckily escapes from them. Hoodman gives to order to everyone in Oasis to capture the remaining devil.
9	"The Oasis' Eerie Dungeon"; Transliteration: "Oashisu no bukimi na chikarou" (Japanese: オアシスの不気味な地下牢)	December 1, 1986
Though he had a good intention, Otter also gets imprisoned, but luckily, friends dig a hole in the wall, allowing the diverse water to fill the room. As the level of water was rising, they dug a hole in the ceiling. In the same time, Hoodman was trying to keep the people of Oasis still deceived, so he gave them some water from the bag from a conjured spring site with a little help of his aides. The citizens discover his fraud, just as a blast of water sets the Bosco crew free from the dungeon. Leon, the guardian of Oasis, and his apprentice, Pansa, give the legendary treasure, the map to Fountain land, to Apricot. The friends fly further.
10	"Bosco Drifting at Sea"; Transliteration: "Bosuko gou kaijou hyouryuu" (Japanese: ボスコ号海上漂流)	December 8, 1986
Friends reach the open sea. Hoodman starts attacking them with bombs, but the big one explodes aboard the Scorpion, splitting it in half. A smaller bomb has made a hole on Bosco's balloon, which forces it to land on water. Then th ship gets driven by a huge whale which bit the Tutty's fishing pole. Luckily, Frog manages to cut the rope, freeing the ship from the whale's force. After a brief repairs to the balloon, Bosco flies in attempt to reach the island, but the strong currents make it crash onto the shore. Apricot falls unconscious from the collision. Frog goes to explore the island, while Tutty and Otter go to find some medicine for Apricot, leaving her unattended for a moment. During that time, the Unicorn kidnaps the princess, as the Messenger promised him that Hoodman will take him away from the island if he obeys his wishes. In the meantime, Hoodman also reaches the other side of the island to seize the princess.
11	"Nervous Unicorn"; Transliteration: "Zuuzuushii Yuniko-n" (Japanese: ずうずうしいユニコーン)	December 16, 1986
Apricot escapes from the villains, while Tutty has an idea to use the Scorpion as counterbalance to raise the Bosco. The Messenger has the same idea, and he suggests Hoodman to use the Unicorn as his servant. When Unicorn gets trapped in cleft stick, Hoodman leaves him there, but Apricot and Frog save him, wrapping his leg with Frog's scarf. Afterwards, both ships try to take off, using one another. Bosco gets stuck in cliffs, but Unicorn bravely separates the ship, after which he starts falling down. With Apricot's words of encouragement he uses his wings and starts to fly for the first time in his life. Feeling grateful to friends, he explains that his family left him here to get independent. Rising currents raise the Bosco ship, so Frog cuts the rope connecting two ships, resulting in Scorpion's tumbling down the mountain's opposite side. Unicorn's relatives come for him, because he is now a grown up man. Apricot gives her scarf to Frog.
12	"Save the Frozen Village! The Great Chase across the Snowfields"; Transliteration: "Kootta mura wo sukue! Setsugen no daitsuiseki" (Japanese: 凍った村を救え!·雪原の大追跡)	December 23, 1986
Hoodman frozes a mountain windmill that was sending the warm wind to a mountain village, which kept the climate without snowing. Bosco reaches the village, already full of snow, and one family accepts them. Frog, Tutty and Otter go to check the windmill, while Hoodman throws a huge snowball on the family's house, trapping the princess and the girl inside. Apricots starts to freeze slowly. In the meantime, guys manage to bring the windmill in its previous state. Speak informs guys about Apricot, and they rush back to save her. Jack and Franz interrupt them in their way down to the village. In the end, they save the Apricot once again from the bad guys.
13	"The Destiny of the Fairy Princess Apricot"; Transliteration: "Yousei Apurikotto hime no sadame" (Japanese: 妖精アプリコット姫のさだめ)	December 30, 1986
In the beginning, Hoodman visits Damia and Scorpion in Fountain land, to ask for a new ship. Back in Bosco, Ender reaches the crew. He informs Apricot of her destiny and tells her that she will change shape by sitting on the throne before total eclipse. Apricot runs away from the crew, trying to find her own way to her homeland. She leaves a letter to her friends. After a long walk in the desert, she falls unconscious. Friends follow her trails, which lead to an enormous rock hill, the castle of evil lizards.
14	"Lizard Castle, Apricot Rescue Operation"; Transliteration: "Tokage-jiro - Apuri kyuushutsu sakusen" (Japanese: トカゲ城アプリ救出作戦)	January 5, 1987
Apricot is trapped in lizard Oja's castle. Hoodman makes a deal with Oja to exchange Frog for the princess, as Oja is only interested in satiating his hunger. Meanwhile, friends try to find a way to enter the castle. Frog manages to enter the castle at night and finds Apricot in a dungeon. They continue the discussion that they began the night before on lake, but Hoodman captures Frog and serves him to Oja. Tutty and Ender save the princess and Frog in the last moment. The four use one of the lizards' catapults in order to return to Bosco. Apricot says to Frog that she will never forget him and their voyage.
15	"The Beautiful Assassin Damia Appears"; Transliteration: "Utsushiki wan satsu ha Damia toujiau" (Japanese: 美しき暗殺者ダミア登場)	January 12, 1987
Damia is finally allowed to participate in kidnapping the princess. She joins Hoodman and they plant a fire in the woods to attract the Bosco crew, who manage to put it down with the river water from their barrels. While they were refilling the barrels, an old helpless granny appeared and the crew agreed to help her. Frog, Tutty and Otter help the people from the village to fix their homes. Just as they reach the ship, Ender takes off leaving the friends behind, planning to return the princess by himself. Apricot almost jumps from the ship, demanding to be taken down. She is then shocked to realize that old granny was Damia in disguise. She knocks Ender unconscious and takes over the ship, directing it to the Forest of sleeping statues.
16	"The Great Battle in the Sleeping Forest"; Transliteration: "Nemuri no mori no daikonsen" (Japanese: 眠りの森の大混戦)	January 19, 1987
Damia has hijacked the Bosco ship with the princess and Ender aboard. Frog, Tutty and Otter wander around until they see Hoodman and his aides trying to fix the Scorpion. They agree to help Hoodman but only if he agrees on allowing them to catch Damia with him. The treacherous Hoodman says yes, but after the friends help them with the repairs, Jack and Franz tie them up. Princess and Ender manage to untie themselves and to jump off from the Bosco into the Sleeping forest, full of stone statues that were once human. Damia orders her soldiers to catch them. Meanwhile, Hoodman attacks Damia. She manages to return one rocket and Scorpion falls to the ground. Then her soldiers, with a help from Hoodman, Jack and Franz construct a platform with the slide ending in special liquid that turns human beings into stone statues. First comes Ender, then comes Apricot. Tutty follows, but because of his shell he manages to jump across the kettle, and grab the statue of the princess. Using the opportunity, Frog and Otter throw Damia's soldiers into the kettle and pour some over the Hoodman, Jack and Franz. They take off with Bosco and grab Damia's antidote, which they sparkle all over the Sleeping forest, turning all the statues back into life. Friends heal Apricot and then take a small picnic, keeping Ender as a statue just for a little longer.
17	"Who is the Fake?"; Transliteration: "Nise mono ha dare da?" (Japanese: ニセはダレダ?)	January 26, 1987
Bosco is situated on a river bank. Damia spies on them from a nearby hill and prepares an intelligent fraud with her accomplices. She launches a signal rocket for Hoodman so he can know where is the Bosco situated. Hoodman then attacks the crew with the same bombs he attacked them in the episode 10. Friends decide to pull the ship deeper into the forest, using ropes and Bosco's landing wheels. After seeing that their bombs explode too early, Hoodman decides to lower his ship down a bit, even though Franz warns them that the forest is rather thick and that they could crash into the trees. Hoodman doesn't follow the advice and eventually the Scorpion crashes into the woods. Friends board the ship. Ender then manages to make friends believe that Frog works secretly for Damia, so Tutty and Otter tie him up and lock him beneath the ship. Bosco approaches a mountain lake. Driving through thick fog, friends don't notice that a huge spiderweb is in front of them, so they get into it. A huge spider-like machine rises from the lake and starts climbing onto the web. The masks are finally taken off - Ender is actually Damia, disguised as him. She kidnaps Apricot and takes her to the vehicle which is controlled by her trusty friend Nicola. Tutty and Otter untie Frog who then tries to save Apricot. Hoodman approaches the site as well and starts attacking Damia. Hoodman's ship eventually crashes, previously setting Bosco free from the web. It then lands undamaged onto the shore. Frog tries to save Apricot, but the spider-like machine goes underwater to the bottom of the lake.
18	"Submarine Battle at the Lakebed"; Transliteration: "Kotei no sensui kan dai sensou" (Japanese: 湖底の潜水艦大戦争)	February 2, 1987
Apricot is trapped in a submersible controlled by Damia and Nicola. Tutty and Otter construct a special vehicle, just like Hoodman and his aides. Frog also constructs his vehicle and then goes down to save Apricot. In the meantime, the real Ender appears. Messenger brings another spider-like vehicle, but Speak manages to stop his plans. Apricot manages to untie herself and escape into the water in an air balloon. Hoodman, Damia, Tutty and Otter fight for her. In the battle, her balloon explodes, but Frog manages to save her. Damia and Hoodman's ships collide with each other, resulting in a huge blast. Friends re-encounter with Ender.
19	"The Mysterious Waterless Kingdom"; Transliteration: "Nazo no mizu nashi oukoku" (Japanese: 謎の水なし王国)	February 9, 1987
A lack of water is forcing both sides to make an unscheduled stop to recharge. To do this, they choose a lake with surrounding towns, inhabited by dogs. While visiting the town, Frog and Tutty discover that the population suffers from water shortage due to the strange order from the local king who forbade the use of water. They become parties to the conflict between the residents and guards. After they get imprisoned together with the people from the conflict, Frog and Tutty organize the escape. One of the prisoners is indistinguishable from the king and the escape is made by changing places with him and taking advantage of the circumstances.
20	"Water-Water Great Battle"; Transliteration: "Mizu mizu daisensou" (Japanese: みず·ミズ大戦争)	February 16, 1987
The king is trying to thwart Damia's plans. Acting together with his counterpart and Apricot's friends, he reveals Damia's plan to the residents, forcing her to escape.
21	"Apricot's Determination"; Transliteration: "Apurikotto no ketsui" (Japanese: アプリコットの決意)	February 25, 1987
The crew visits Ender's village which was destroyed by a huge black storm. Ender stays with his friends to defend the remains of his village and the crew luckily manages to escape from the storm. They see the Fountain land from a nearby mountain and Apricot once again promises to herself that she will bring it back as it once was.
22	"The Decaying Royal Palace, Bosco is Destroyed!"; Transliteration: "Koreyuku oukyuu - Bosuko gou daiha!" (Japanese: 枯れゆく王宮·ボスコ号大破!)	March 2, 1987
Apricot and Frog decide to descend to Fountain land using delta planes. Damia's soldiers are omnipresent, blocking up roads with heavy artillery. A runaway boy comes to Apricot and recognizes her. He diverts soldiers' attention from her and Frog, but Apricot refuses to leave him alone in the streets so she convinces Frog to help her save him. Eventually, the soldiers surround them. Frog sends out a rocket message to Tutty who sees it using binoculars. Hoodman appears in the same time and overwhelmed with jealousy, he decides to attack Damia's soldiers to seize Apricot by himself. Accidentally, he crashes into a nearby palace. Apricot and Frog manage to escape on Bosco, but Damia furiously orders soldiers to catapult the Bosco ship. With Bosco being exposed to heavy rocks, Apricot turns on the turbo speed system which bursts the ship out of town. After a while Tutty loses control over the ship, so they crash into the mountains.
23	"Terror of the Black Storm"; Transliteration: "Kuroi suto-mu no kyoufu" (Japanese: 黒いストームの恐怖)	March 9, 1987
Bosco has crashed into the mountains. Apricot dreams about her mother. In a moment, they see Fountain land all perfect as it was before, but in the next moment the cruel reality of a dried up land appears. Apricot wakes others up. Scorpion forbids Damia to interfere into future Hoodman's attempts to catch the princess. Hoodman and his aides are working in the mines beneath the city. Messenger carries the good news to Hoodman about his possible come back and a new chance given to him by Scorpion. Bosco crew fix the ship. Apricot helplessly watches a dark storm drying up the rest of greenery. Soon, friends from the Bosco forest and other allies arrive to help. The Scorpion ship arrives and friends start attacking them, but tricky Hoodman raises a white flag. Promising to Apricot a ride to Fountain land where she won't be noticed, he manages to deceive her. She is abducted once again, but luckily Frog manages to jump on the ship in the last moment.
24	"Confrontation with the Demon Scorpion"; Transliteration: "Ummei no nichi akuma suko-pion to no tsuiketsu" (Japanese: 悪魔スコーピオンとの対決)	March 16, 1987
Apricot surrendered herself to Hoodman. Frog remains hidden inside the Scorpion until they reach Fountainland. Then he hides in the boxes which are a present for His Majesty from Hoodman. Damia takes control of the princess and brings her to His Majesty. He tells her that he is a monster who lives by eating up planets. He started to dry out this planet because he hated water. Princess cried and said that tomorrow she will bring the water back, but His Majesty turned into a horrible creature, his true shape - a Scorpion. He then attacks her, but Frog manages to reach the throne room and save her. They both get lost in the labyrinth beneath the castle. Hoodman and his aides see the real face of His Majesty too, and they run away. Damia is confused and doubtful - she is not sure if she can trust His Majesty any more. She meets with Frog and Apricot, but Hoodman gets in her way and she loses them. Scorpion tells her that they will get killed in the depths anyhow. Tutty and Otter reach the Fountain land. Less than twenty hours remain to the total eclipse of the sun. Apricot and Frog are surrounded by the black servants of Scorpion.
25	"Run, Frog, The Day of the Sun Ring has Come!"; Transliteration: "Hashire, Furoku - Taiyou no yubiwa no hi wa kita!" (Japanese: 走れフローク 太陽の指輪の日は来た!)	March 23, 1987
Tutty and Otto reach the Fountain land and land near the temple. Running away from the black worms, Apricot and Frog go deeper into the caves. Scorpion tells Damia that he will take care of Apricot and Frog. Tutty and Otto get captured by Hoodman, but they manage to trick him into taking them down beneath the castle as Tutty tells him that there is a hidden gold in the depths of Fountain land. Apricot and Frog find a secret mine where villagers from the town are working like slaves to bury the Well of Life. By that time, Speak gathered all allies to Bosco since the start of their travel and together with them he started a rebellion against the soldiers. Damia isn't sending her soldiers to help the Scorpion's, as she isn't sure yet about his further plans. Hoodman reached the Well of Life after falling with his aides through a hole. Otto and Tutty, who has tied ropes to pillars to remember the way back, also made it to the Well. Hoodman started a rebellion there between the workers. They defeat the soldiers and with Apricot, Frog, Tutty and Otter in the lead, they escape to the grounds to help the others who were already fighting outside. There are only ten minutes left until the eclipse.
26	"Apricot's Transformation, Will the Fountain of Life be Restored"; Transliteration: "Apuri henshin - Yomigaeru ka inochi no izumi" (Japanese: アプリ変身·よみがえるか命の泉)	March 30, 1987
The stone pillar with the throne has already risen up without the princess. Apricot hurries and starts climbing the pillar to make it on time before the full eclipse. Once again, His Majesty turns into the Scorpion and Damia flees for the time being. Frog attacks the Scorpion and grabs one of his scales, but Scorpion knocks him down. Apricot continues climbing up the pillar. Damia, betrayed by the Scorpion, takes the Scorpion ship and her soldiers and starts attacking the monster. The monster destroys the ship and kills most of the soldiers, but Damia survives. Tutty and Otto move the Bosco ship closer to Frog and lower him a rope. Scorpion knocks the princess down to the half of the pillar. Ender then appears and gives her back the strength to carry on. Frog continues attacking the monster. The Mother Dragon comes and helps Frog to stop the Scorpion. Apricot finally climbs to the throne. The beams raise her from the pillar. She gives Frog her necklace. The water emerges and Hoodman and his aides run away from the Well. Apricot is levitating on the top of the water pillar. The Fountain land transforms back into its original state. Bosco lands. Speak tries to penetrate the aura around the princess, but the energy throws him back. He becomes a living bird. The water descends and the princess disappears. She returns just for a moment to say good-bye to her friends. The water kills the black worms. Hoodman, Jack, Franz, Damia and the Messenger start searching for a new life. Ender says that Frog, Tutty and Otter are the knights of Fountain land. Everyone returns to their homes, and all animals from Bosco forest set off to a long journey back. During the flight, princess Apricot appears for the last time to say to the crew that her spirit will forever be with them.

== Music ==
Background music in Bosco Adventure varies from colorful and cheerful, to moody, nostalgic and sentimental, with typical Japanese sounds. It has variety of cues, for every situation and place which crew visits (Sleeping Giant, Oasis, Ocean...). Several cues repeat throughout the episodes, depending on the situation. Songs that were released on bonus disc as a part of DVD are: "Tokimeki wa Forever" (ときめきはForever, opening song, sung by Noriko Hidaka), "Hareta hi nimo ai wo kudasai" (はれたひにもあいをください, closing song, also sung by Noriko Hidaka), "Kara Kara Makkura" (カラカラまっくら, sung by voice actors that gave voice to Hoodman, Jack and Franz) and "Bosco Adventure" (ボスコアドベンチャー, sung by voice actors that gave voice to Apricot, Frog, Tutty and Otter).

== Releases outside Japan ==
- Arab World: As "سفينة الأصدقاء" (Safenat Al-Asdeqa'a - The Friends' Ship) it was dubbed in the early 90s by Kuwaiti dubbing center called Funoon Centre. It was a huge success and played by the TV channels in CCG (Kuwait, Oman, UAE, Bahrain, Saudi Arabia and Qatar).
- Bulgaria: As "Приключенията на Боско" (Prikliucheniata na Bosko - The Adventures of Bosco) the show aired from end of May/start of June to December 8, 1991, on BNT (Kanal 1).
- Cameroon, Egypt, France: As "Les aventures du Bosco", it aired in Cameroon on CRTV in 1992, in Egypt on Egyptian Channel 3 in early 1990s, and in France on La Cinq in 1990. In Egypt it wasn't dubbed in Arabic, as only the French dub aired on Egyptian Channel 3 in the early 1990s, when there was a partnership between the Egyptian networks and the French network.
- Canada: As "La Forêt Magique", it aired in the early 1990s on TVA, a French-language network based in Montreal, PQ.
- Estonia: As "Bosco Seiklused" in 1996.
- Hungary: As "A Bosco léghajó kalandjai", it was shown on TV channel Msat and released on VHS by Tower Video with two episodes/volume.
- Israel: As "חבורת הצב המעופף" (Havurat Hatzav Hameofef – The Flying Turtle Group), it was shown on the Israeli Channel 1.
- Italy: As "La principessa dai capelli blu" (approx. Blue-haired Princess), it was transmitted on Italia 1 in 1988.
- Poland: As "Przygody Bosco" on Top Canal in 1991, and Polish-dubbed version on TVN in 1997.
- Russia, Latvia: As "Приключения Боско" (Prikljuchenija Bosko). In Russia, only last ten episodes were shown on RTR in 1992. In Latvia, the same Russian-dubbed version was twice aired by KS Video channel in 1993 and 1994 (only episodes 17–26 were shown, with the last one being dropped both times).
- South Korea: As "날아라 거북선" on KBS in 1987.
- Spain, Mexico, Chile: "Las aventuras de la nave Bosco"
- Thailand: As "บอสโก ป่ามหัศจรรย์" (Bosco, The Magical Forest), it was shown on 7 Channel in 1991.
- Serbia (Yugoslavia): As "Плава принцеза" (Blue Princess), it was shown on TV Novi Sad in 1991. Overall, sixteen episodes were shown, first twelve and the last four.
