= Francis Meres =

English churchman and author (1565/1566–1647)

Francis Meres (1565/1566 – 29 January 1647) was an English churchman and author. His 1598 commonplace book includes the first critical account of poems and plays by Shakespeare.

== Career ==
Francis Meres was born in 1565 at Kirton Meres in the parish of Kirton, Lincolnshire. He was educated at Pembroke College, Cambridge, where he received a BA in 1587 and an MA in 1591. Two years later he was incorporated an MA of Oxford. His relative, John Meres, was high sheriff of Lincolnshire in 1596, and apparently helped him in the early part of his career. In 1602 he became rector of Wing, Rutland, where he also ran a school. Both his son Francis and his grandson Edward received their BA and MA from Cambridge and became rectors.

Meres is especially known for his Palladis Tamia, Wits Treasury (1598), a commonplace book that is important as a source on the Elizabethan poets, and more particularly as the first critical account of the poems and early plays of William Shakespeare. Its list of Shakespeare's plays contributed to establishing their chronology.

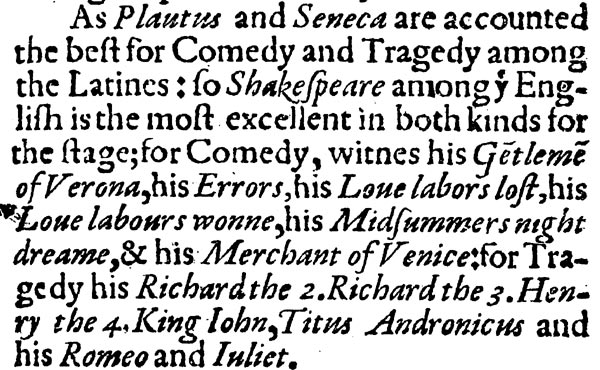
Excerpt from Palladis Tamia (1598) listing 12 of Shakespeare's plays

The Palladis Tamia also contained moral and critical reflections borrowed from various sources, and embraced sections on books, on philosophy, on music and painting, and a "Comparative Discourse of our English poets with the Greeke, Latin, and Italian poets." This chapter enumerates the English poets from Chaucer to Meres's own day, and in each case a comparison with some classical author is instituted.

A sermon entitled Gods Arithmeticke (1597) and two translations from the Spanish of Luís de Granada entitled Granada's Devotion and The Sinners' Guide (1598) complete Meres's list of works.

== Marriage and issue ==
Meres had a wife, Mary (1576/1577–1631), whose maiden name is unknown. They had a son, Francis, born in 1607. In Shakespeare's Sonnets (1904), Charlotte Stopes stated that Meres was the brother-in-law of John Florio, but investigations by George Greenwood suggest Stopes erred in that claim.

Meres died in 1647 and was buried in the parish Church of St Peter and St Paul, Wing, Rutland.
