= Lupatelli =

Lupatelli is an Italian surname. Notable people with the surname include:

- Antonio Lupatelli (1930–2018), Italian illustrator and writer
- Cristiano Lupatelli (born 1978), Italian football coach and former footballer
