= Wing, Rutland =

Village in the county of Rutland, England

Coordinates: 52.620°N 0.682°W

Wing
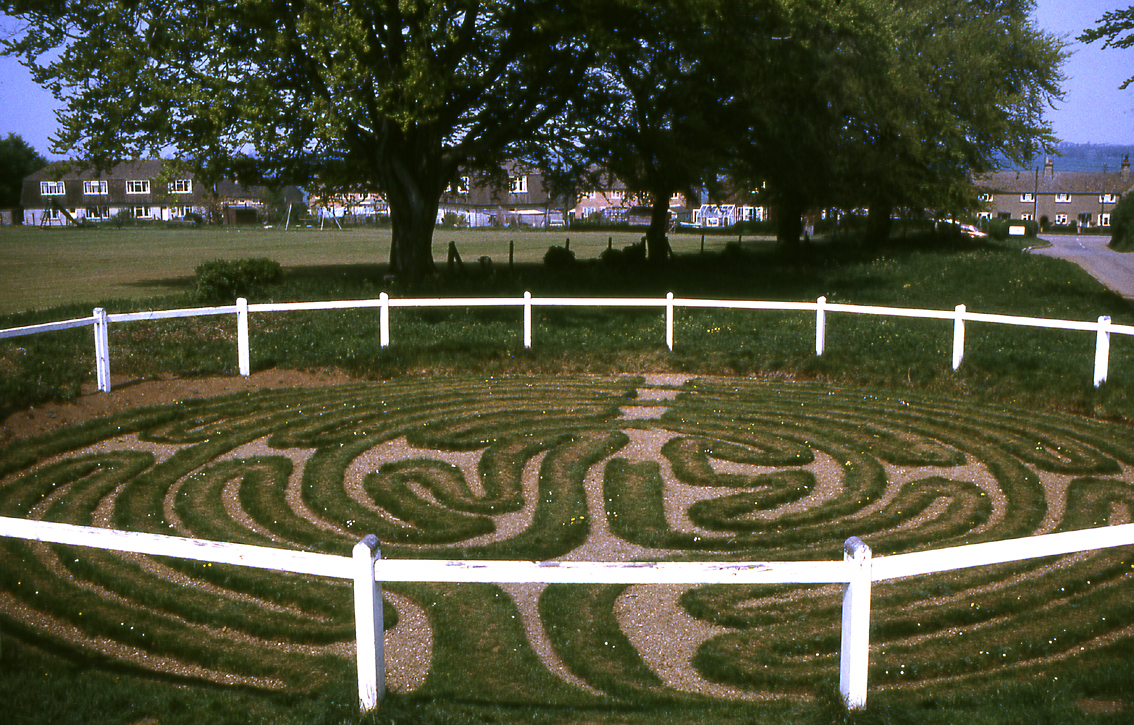
- Wing's turf maze

- Location within Rutland
- Area: 1.74 sq mi (4.5 km^{2})
- Population: 314 2011 Census
  - Density: 181/sq mi (70/km^{2})
- OS grid reference: SK893033
  - London: 80 mi (130 km) SSE
- Unitary authority: Rutland
- Ceremonial county: Rutland
- Region: East Midlands
- Country: England
- Sovereign state: United Kingdom
- Post town: OAKHAM
- Postcode district: LE15
- Dialling code: 01572
- Police: Leicestershire
- Fire: Leicestershire
- Ambulance: East Midlands
- UK Parliament: Rutland and Stamford

Wing is a village and civil parish in the East Midlands county of Rutland, England. The population was 315 at the 2001 census and 314 at that of 2011. It features a fine church and a labyrinth made of turf. Rutland Water reservoir is nearby.

== Heritage ==
The village name, first found as Wenge in the 12th century, probably derives from the Old Norse vengi, meaning field.

Seventeenth-century houses in Wing were built of stone quarried at nearby Barnack and Clipsham. Many are roofed with Collyweston stone slate.

The Church of St Peter and St Paul, Wing was much rebuilt in 1875, when the spire was removed. Some parts date from Norman times, including the south arcade of about 1150, the slightly later north arcade, and the north doorway.

=== Maze ===
Cut into the turf beside Glaston Road is a circular "turf maze" roughly 40 ft (12 m) in diameter (actually a unicursal labyrinth) It is thought to date back to medieval times, based on the fact that its design is similar to the pavement maze in Chartres cathedral and those at other medieval sites.

== Amenities ==
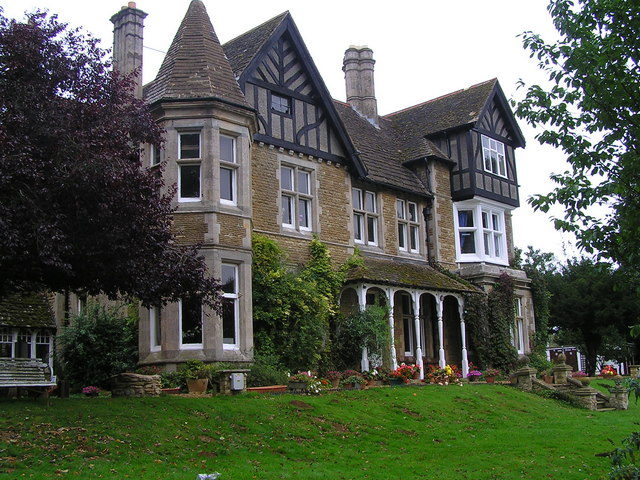
Wing Hall; South face

The remaining public house is the King's Arms. The name of the Cuckoo Inn, closed in 2004, alluded to a legend that the people of Wing once tried to keep spring in the village forever by erecting a fence around a cuckoo to stop it from leaving. Naturally, it flew over the fence and away. As a result, people from the village were known as "Wing Fools". This is actually a widespread story, the best-known version probably appearing among the adventures the Wise Men of Gotham. There is a village hall.

Wing Hall has a camping and caravan site with a shop and café.

A plant outside Wing treats water extracted from Rutland Water reservoir a few miles to the north. Proposals by Anglian Water to raise the volume of water extracted were opposed by the RSPB, fearing that water-level changes would damage adjacent wildfowl habitats.

Medical, legal and other services can be found in Oakham (6 miles, 10 km).

=== Transport ===
Wing has one or two daily weekday buses with Oakham. Hourly daytime buses six days a week between Melton Mowbray, Oakham and Corby pass through Manton 1.3 miles (2 km) away. The nearest railway station is at Oakham (6 miles, 10 km), but Corby (11.5 miles, 18.5 km) has hourly services seven days a week to London St Pancras, changing at Kettering (a little over an hour).

Also nearby (1.5 miles, 2.4 km) is the main A6003 road between Kettering and Oakham via Uppingham.

== Notable people ==
In birth order:

- Thomas Smith (c. 1556–1609), English master of requests
- Francis Meres (1565–1647), churchman and author, became Rector of Wing in 1602.
- Sir Charles Vernon Boys, FRS (1855–1944), experimental physicist, was born in Wing.
- Air Chief Marshal Sir Clive Loader (born 1953), Leicestershire Police and Crime Commissioner, 2012–2016.
- Angela Harding (born 1960), artist and printmaker.

== See also ==
- Wing Water Treatment Works SSSI
