= Wing Water Treatment Works =

Coordinates: 52.614°N 0.676°W

- Site of Special Scientific Interest
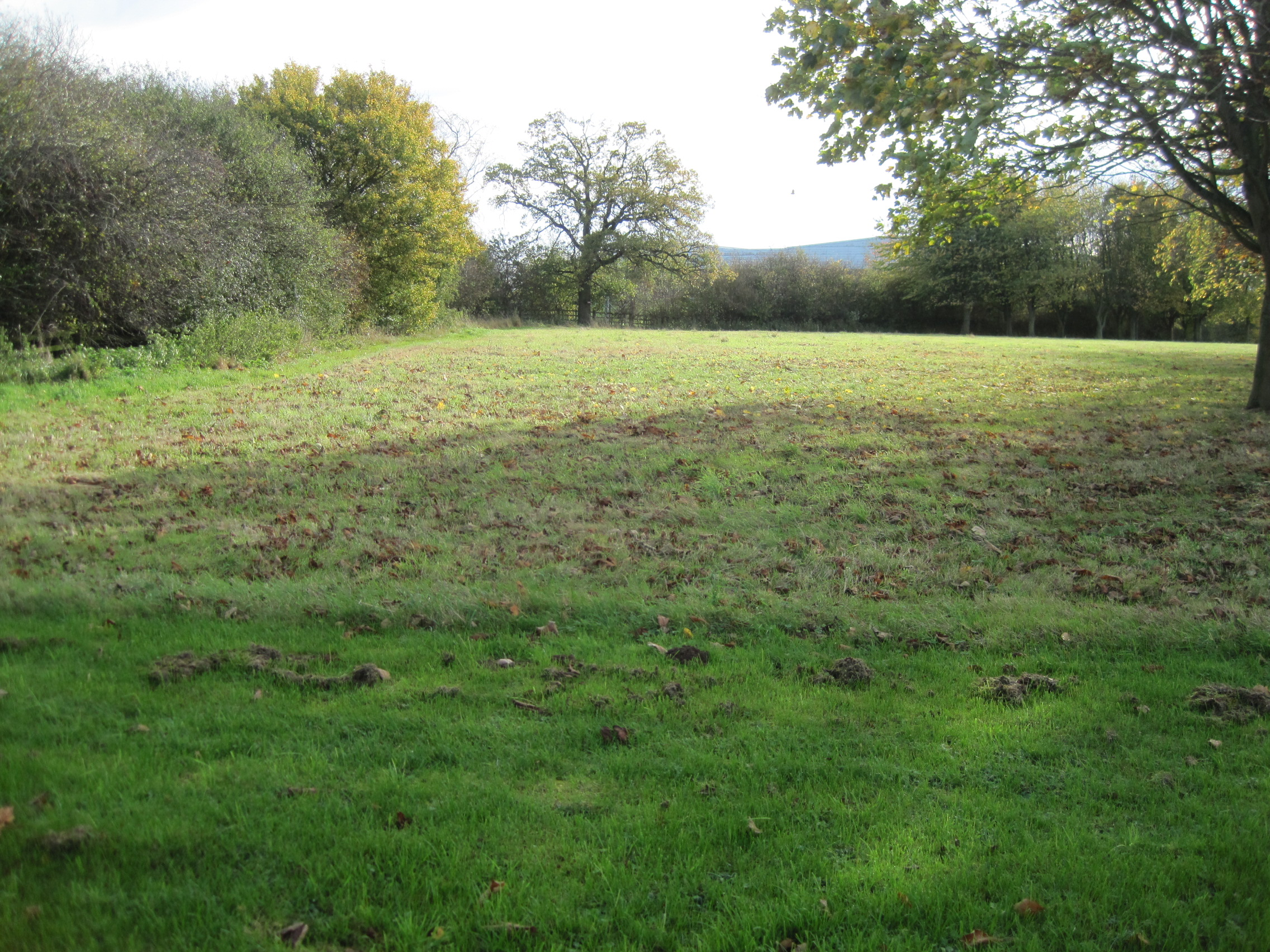
- Location of Wing Water Treatment Works.
- Area of search: Rutland
- Grid reference: SK 898 026
- Interest: Geological
- Area: 1.5 hectares
- Notification date: 1987
- Location map: Magic Map

Wing Water Treatment Works is a 1.5-hectare (3.7-acre) geological Site of Special Scientific Interest east of Wing in Rutland. It is a Geological Conservation Review site.

This site is stratigraphically important both regionally and nationally, as it has the longest sequence known in Britain of deposits from the warm Ipswichian interglacial around 120,000 years ago, and it has yielded new paleobotanical records for this period.

There is access to the site from Morcott Road, but it has been filled in and no geology is visible.

The site is adjacent to the water treatment works, operated by Anglian Water, that treats water extracted from Rutland Water reservoir, a few miles to the north.
