= Willy Bach, Baron Bach =

British Labour politician (born 1946)

The Right Honourable The Lord Bach
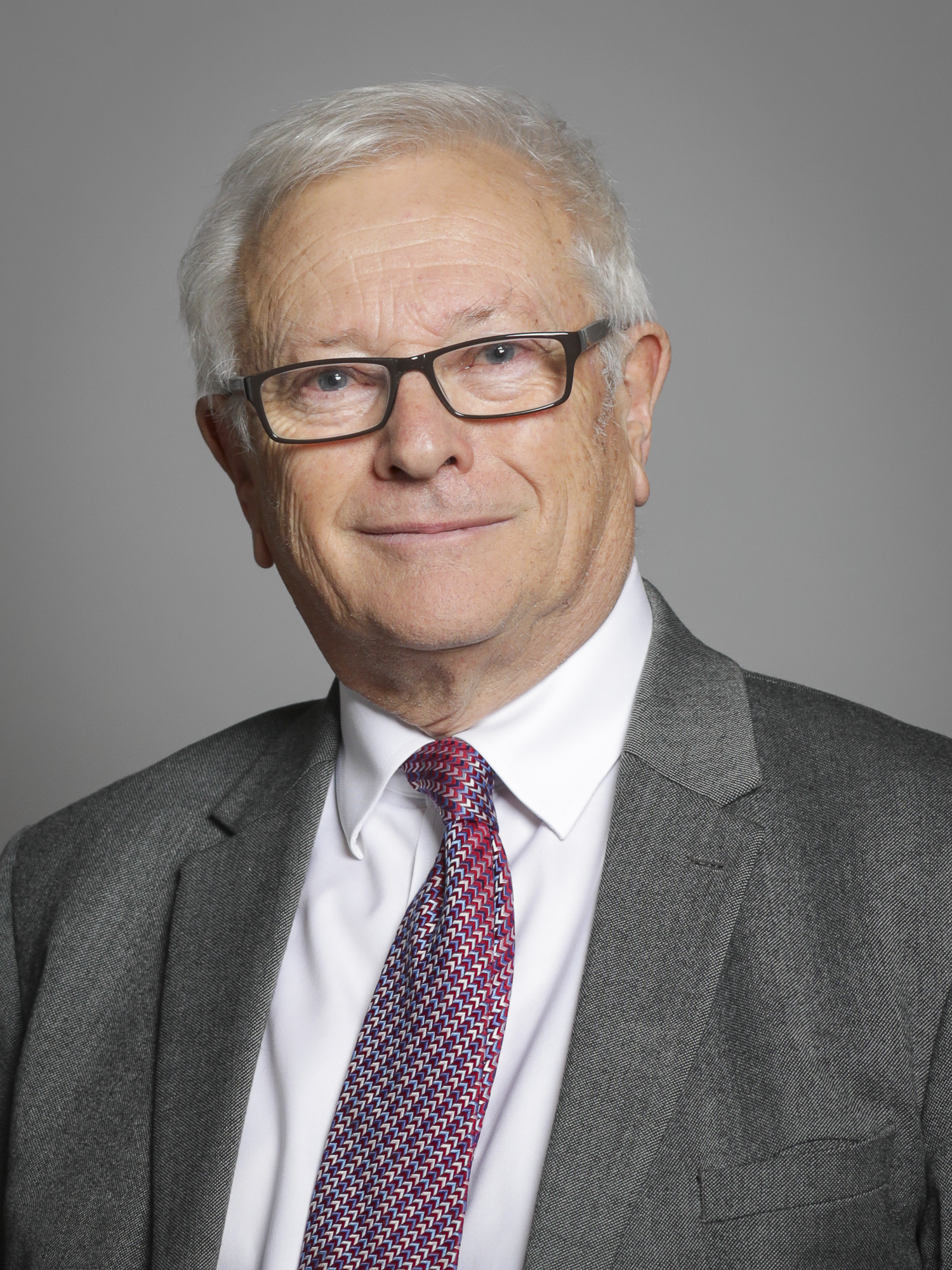
- Bach in 2019

Leicestershire Police and Crime Commissioner
- In office 12 May 2016 – 12 May 2021
- Deputy: Kirk Master
- Preceded by: Clive Loader
- Succeeded by: Rupert Matthews

Shadow Attorney General for England and Wales
- In office 3 December 2014 – 14 September 2015
- Leader: Ed Miliband; Harriet Harman (Acting)
- Preceded by: Emily Thornberry
- Succeeded by: Catherine McKinnell
Ministerial offices
Parliamentary Under-Secretary of State for Justice
In office 5 October 2008 – 11 May 2010
Prime Minister	Gordon Brown
Preceded by	The Lord Hunt of Kings Heath
Succeeded by	The Lord McNally
Lord-in-Waiting Government Whip
In office 7 November 2007 – 9 June 2009
Prime Minister	Gordon Brown
Preceded by	The Lord Truscott
Succeeded by	The Lord Faulkner of Worcester
In office 28 July 1999 – 21 November 2000
Prime Minister	Tony Blair
Preceded by	The Lord Hunt of Kings Heath
Succeeded by	The Lord Truscott (2007)
Parliamentary Under-Secretary of State for Farming, Food and Sustainable Energy
In office 10 May 2005 – 5 May 2006
Prime Minister	Tony Blair
Preceded by	The Lord Whitty
Succeeded by	The Lord Rooker
Parliamentary Under-Secretary of State for Defence Procurement
In office 9 June 2001 – 6 May 2005
Prime Minister	Tony Blair
Preceded by	The Baroness Symons of Vernham Dean
Succeeded by	The Lord Drayson
Parliamentary Secretary for Lord Chancellor's Department
In office 22 November 2000 – 11 June 2001
Prime Minister	Tony Blair
Preceded by	Jane Kennedy
Succeeded by	Michael Wills

Member of the House of Lords
- Lord Temporal
- Life peerage 27 July 1998

Personal details
- Born: William Stephen Goulden Bach; 25 December 1946 (age 79)
- Party: Labour

William Stephen Goulden "Willy" Bach, Baron Bach (born 25 December 1946) is a British Labour member of the House of Lords. He was a Parliamentary Under-Secretary of State in the Ministry of Justice from 2008 to 2010. He resigned from the opposition front bench when he was elected the Leicestershire Police and Crime Commissioner on 6 May 2016. He did not stand again at the 2021 PCC election and was succeeded by the Conservative Rupert Matthews.

== Early life ==
Bach was educated at Westminster School, then an all-boys public school located within the precincts of Westminster Abbey. He studied at New College, Oxford, graduating with a Bachelor of Arts (BA) degree. In 1972, he was called to the Bar, and then worked as a barrister. He went on to become head of barristers' chambers at King Street Chambers in Leicester on the Midland Circuit in 1996. He also was a councillor in Leicester and Harborough.

== Political career ==
Bach was the unsuccessful Labour parliamentary candidate for Gainsborough in 1979 and for Sherwood in both the 1983 and 1987 general elections.

On 27 July 1998, Bach was created a life peer, as Baron Bach, of Lutterworth in the County of Leicestershire, where he lives. He was appointed a Government Whip in the Lords exactly one year later on 27 July 1999 in the 1999 government reshuffle, thereby enjoying the office as one of Her Majesty's Lords in Waiting.

From November 2000, Lord Bach served as a Parliamentary Under-Secretary of State in the Lord Chancellor's Department, until June 8, 2001 when, after the general election, Lord Bach replaced The Baroness Symons of Vernham Dean as Parliamentary Under-Secretary of State for Defence Procurement.

During Lord Bach's tenure, the United Kingdom was involved in choosing between the Boeing X-32 and Lockheed X-35 designs for the Joint Strike Fighter project. Highlighting the level of British participation in the project, Lord Bach was present at the United States Department of Defense announcement that Lockheed Martin had won the competition. Lord Bach was also at the signing of "Type Acceptance" – essentially, the release into service – of the RAF's Typhoon platform.

Following the 2005 general election, Lord Drayson succeeded Lord Bach at the Ministry of Defence, and Lord Bach was transferred to the Department for Environment, Food and Rural Affairs as Parliamentary Under-Secretary of State responsible for Sustainable Farming and Food. He held this post until 2006, when he returned to the back benches. As of 5 October 2008, Lord Bach was brought back into government as Parliamentary Under-Secretary of State for Justice replacing former Lord Hunt of Kings Heath OBE.

Lord Bach was chairman of the SELEX Sensors and Airborne Systems SpA Board of Directors and Director (UK) of Italian arms company Finmeccanica until 2007, when he resigned from the board in order to return to his role as a government whip. In October 2008, Lord Bach was promoted to become a Parliamentary Under-Secretary of State in the Ministry of Justice, where he served until May 2010.

In October 2013, Lord Bach became a Shadow Foreign and Commonwealth Office Minister on the Official Opposition frontbench headed by Ed Miliband. On 3 December 2014, he took on the additional role of Shadow Attorney General following the resignation of Emily Thornberry. He was replaced by Catherine McKinnell after the election of Jeremy Corbyn as Labour Party leader.

== The Bach Commission ==
The Bach Commission was founded at the end of 2015, and worked to find evidence on the current legal aid crisis in the UK justice system. Lord Bach chairs this commission, with Henry Brooke as vice-chair. The Commission argued that LASPO had severely affected access to justice, and identified six key features in the justice system to demonstrate this.

== Personal life ==
In Who's Who, Lord Bach listed his interests as watching cricket and football (he is a supporter of Leicester City). He is married, with three children. He is also a great-nephew of suffragette Emmeline Pankhurst.

Political offices
Preceded by Emily Thornberry	Shadow Attorney General; 2014–2015	Succeeded by Catherine McKinnell
Orders of precedence in the United Kingdom
Preceded by The Lord Lamont of Lerwick	Gentlemen; Baron Bach	Followed by The Lord Evans of Watford
