= Jack and Jill (comics) =

British children's comics magazine

Publication information
- Publisher: Amalgamated Press; Fleetway Publications; IPC Magazines
- Schedule: Weekly
- Format: Ongoing series
- Genre: Humor/comedy
- Publication date: 27 February 1954 – 29 June 1985
- No. of issues: c. 1,640
- Main character(s): Jack and Jill of Buttercup Farm

Jack and Jill was a British children's comics magazine published by Amalgamated Press/Fleetway/IPC between 27 February 1954 and 29 June 1985, a run of approximately 1,640 issues. In 1955, Jack and Jill absorbed the fellow Amalgamated Press title Playbox (launched in 1925).

The title of the magazine was derived from the nursery rhyme of the same title but the characters Jack and Jill of Buttercup Farm were otherwise unrelated. Jack and Jill of Buttercup Farm was the cover strip for many years, originally drawn by Hugh McNeill and later by Antonio Lupatelli.

The stories of Jack and Jill were related in rhyming couplets, as were a number of other early stories, although by the end of the 1970s the stories were written in normal prose form. Others were told in captions below the illustrations or text comics, a style of storytelling common to pre-war nursery comic magazines such as Puck (published 1904–1940) and The Rainbow (published 1914–1956).

== Strips and text comics ==
- Chalky the Blackboard Boy
- Douglas Dachshund
- The Enchanted House
- Flipper the Skipper / Flipper the Jolly Penguin
- Fliptail the Otter, by Bernard Long
- Freddie Frog
- Fun in Toyland
- Gregory Grasshopper
- Harold Hare
- Jack and Jill of Buttercup Farm
- Jerry, Don and Snooker
- Joe, based on the BBC TV series
- Katie Country Mouse
- Linda and Her Magic Bubble Mixture
- Little Miss, based on the characters created by Roger Hargreaves
- Moonie
- Pinky and Perky, based on the TV series
- Pixie Pip
- Snuggles the Koala Bear
- Teddy and Cuddly
- Tiger Tim and the Bruin Boys
- Toad of Toad Hall, based on The Wind in the Willows story
- Tommy Trouble
- Walter Hottle-Bottle
- The Wombles, based on the BBC TV series

== Sources ==
- Jack and Jill at the Grand Comics Database
