= Bernard Long =

British book illustrator and comic artist

- Born: 1926
- Area: Artist

Bernard Long (born 1926) was a British book illustrator and comic artist who contributed many episodes of "Fliptail the Otter" to Jack and Jill in the 1970s.

== Books illustrated by Bernard Long ==
- Prehistoric Animals, by Rupert Oliver (London, Hodder & Stoughton, 1982 ISBN 0-340-27165-5)
- Prehistoric Man, by Rupert Oliver (London, Hodder & Stoughton, 1983 ISBN 0-340-28608-3)
- Dinosaurs, by Rupert Oliver (London, Hodder & Stoughton, 1983 ISBN 0-340-28609-1)
- Strange and Curious Creatures, by Rupert Oliver (London, Hodder & Stoughton, 1984 ISBN 0-340-34718-X)
- Monster Mysteries, by Rupert Matthews (Hove, Wayland, 1988 ISBN 1-85210-354-X)
- Lost Treasures, by John Wright (Hove, Wayland, 1989 ISBN 1-85210-357-4)
- Victorian Children, by Anne Steel (Hove, Wayland, 1989 ISBN 1-85210-816-9)
- Egyptian Farmers, by Jim Kerr (Hove, Wayland, 1990 ISBN 1-85210-906-8)
- The First Settlements, by Rupert Matthews (Hove, Wayland, 1990 ISBN 1-85210-769-3)
- Greek Cities, by Barry Steel (Hove, Wayland, 1990 ISBN 1-85210-778-2)
- Plague and Fire, by Rhoda Nottridge (Hove, Wayland, 1990 ISBN 0-7502-0048-0)
- Forests, by Michael Chinery (London, Kingfisher, 1992 ISBN 0-86272-915-7)
