= Clive Loader =

British politician and Royal Air Force officer (born 1953)

Air Chief Marshal Sir Clive Loader KCB OBE ADC FRAeS
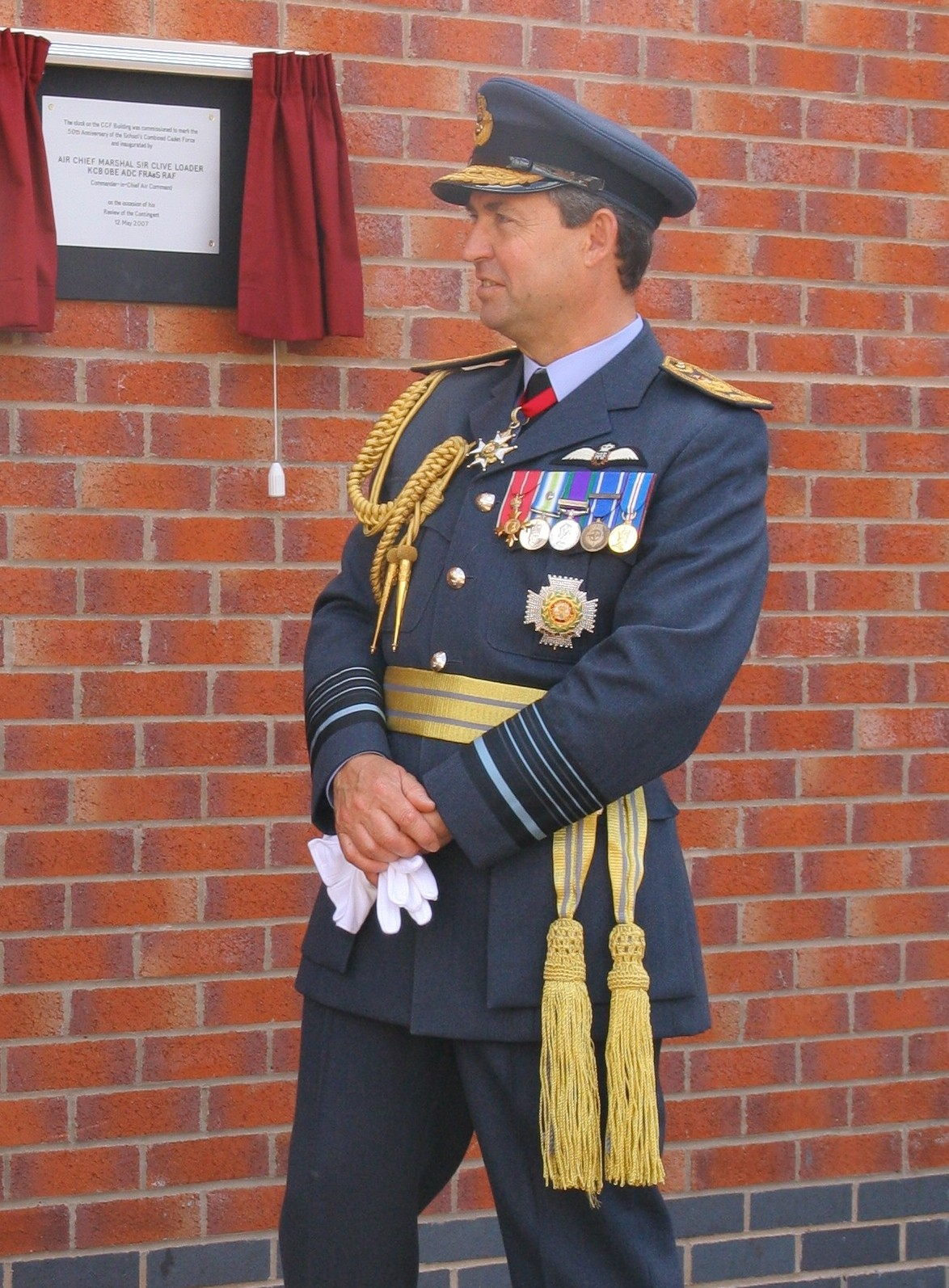
- Sir Clive Loader in 2007

Leicestershire Police and Crime Commissioner
- In office 22 November 2012 – 11 May 2016
- Preceded by: Office created
- Succeeded by: Willy Bach

Personal details
- Born: 24 September 1953 (age 73)
- Party: Conservative
- Spouse(s): Alison Leith, Lady Loader
- Education: Judd School, Tonbridge; University of Southampton

Military service
- Allegiance: United Kingdom
- Branch/service: Royal Air Force
- Years of service: 1972–2009
- Rank: Air Chief Marshal
- Commands: Air Command (2007–09); RAF Laarbruch (1996–99); No. 3 (Fighter) Squadron (1993–95)
- Battles/wars: Falklands War
- Awards: Knight Commander of the Order of the Bath; Officer of the Order of the British Empire

Air Chief Marshal Sir Clive Robert Loader, KCB, OBE, ADC, FRAeS (born 24 September 1953) is a British politician and retired senior Royal Air Force officer. He was the Leicestershire Police and Crime Commissioner from 2012 until 2016. He served in the RAF from 1972 to 2009 and was the first Commander-in-Chief Air Command.

== Early life ==
Loader was born on 24 September 1953. From 1965 to 1971, he was educated at The Judd School, a grammar school in Tonbridge, Kent. He then went on to study at the University of Southampton.

== Military career ==
Loader joined the Royal Air Force (RAF) in 1973. He was posted as a junior officer to No 1 (F) Squadron at RAF Wittering and then IV (Army Cooperation) Squadron at RAF Gütersloh, Germany, flying Harriers. He was promoted to squadron leader in 1984 and became a flight commander in Germany. In 1989, he was promoted to wing commander and went briefly to RAF Rheindahlen before being made Personal Staff Officer to the Air Officer Commander-in-Chief RAF Strike Command.

He was given command of No. 3 (F) Squadron, at RAF Laarbruch in 1993 in which role he took part in operations over Northern Iraq and Bosnia. In 1995, he was promoted to group captain and attended the Higher Command and Staff College and then became station commander at RAF Laarbruch in 1996. Loader was appointed an Officer of the Order of the British Empire in the 1996 New Year Honours.

Loader was promoted to air commodore in 1999 and became Air Commodore for the Harriers in 2000. Promoted again, this time to air vice marshal, he was appointed as Assistant Chief of Defence Staff (Operations) in 2002 and Deputy Commander-in-Chief RAF Strike Command, in the rank of air marshal, in 2004. Loader was appointed a Knight Commander of the Order of the Bath in the 2006 New Year Honours. Promoted to air chief marshal in 2007, he became the first Commander-in-Chief of Air Command on 1 April of that same year. He retired from the RAF in 2009.

== Leicestershire Police and Crime Commissioner ==
In April 2012, while serving as a parish councillor in Wing, Rutland, Loader announced he was seeking the Conservative nomination as the Leicestershire Police and Crime Commissioner. He stated that Leicestershire Constabulary should operate to those same high standards of effectiveness, efficiency and professionalism that he embraced during his RAF career. Loader was selected as the Conservative candidate on 26 May 2012. He was opposed by Labour's Sarah Russell, Leicester deputy mayor and chair of the Safer Leicester Partnership which coordinates the police with other services, and Suleman Nagdi, a community worker and businessman standing as an independent.

He was elected to the role with 47% of the first choice vote in a turnout of only 16.36%, winning after second choice votes were taken into account. 2.65% of the total votes cast were spoiled. The turnout was one of the lowest ever seen in Leicestershire and Rutland leading University of Leicester criminologist Dr James Treadwell to ask if the £75m national cost of the elections was money well spent.

=== In office ===
Loader was sworn in on 21 November 2012. He said the main change was that the public now had a person they could approach if they had problems with particular aspects of policing priorities. In an interview with East Midlands BBC in June 2013, following Keith Vaz's questions about the role of police commissioners in general and criticisms of their effectiveness in several neighbouring counties, particularly Lincolnshire, Loader acknowledged MPs' concerns and was shown visiting inner city Leicester in a "charm offensive" intended to improve confidence in the police.

Loader took Blaby District Council to judicial review after it granted planning permission for 4,250 new homes at Lubbesthorpe. Loader had wanted the £2m allocated for police vehicles, communication equipment and buildings to be available "in the early stages" adding that delay would have an unacceptable impact on services and the situation was untenable. The judge found in favour of the council and the commissioner's actions were criticised as a waste of time and public money.

In July 2015 Loader announced he would not be seeking re-election and that he had always regarded his work, though enjoyable "as something akin to a 'last tour of duty.'"

In August, he said he was unaware, but should have been informed of, a three months experimental scheme by Leicestershire police to save money by only investigating burglaries at even numbered properties. The force has had its budget cut by 17% with more expected. Jonathan Ashworth, one of a number of critics, said the scheme was "ridiculous and haphazard" and he would write to the Home Secretary.

In December he thanked G4S for a feasibility report on handling emergency calls to the Leicestershire, Nottinghamshire and Northamptonshire police which they believed could enable more money to be spent on front line policing but said the police "preferred to be masters of their own destiny."

== Personal life ==
In 1976 he married Alison Leith. The couple live in Wing, Rutland. Together, they have three sons; Matt (born 1980), Tom (born 1982) and Edward (born 1988). They were all educated at Bedford School, where Loader is a school governor. He is a keen military historian.

Military offices
Unknown	Assistant Chief of the Defence Staff (Operations); 2002–2004	Succeeded by Nick Houghton
Preceded by Sir Glenn Torpy	Deputy Commander-in-Chief RAF Strike Command; 2004–2007	Command disbanded
New title Command established by merging: Strike Command (C-in-C Joe French); Personnel and Training Command (C-in-C Barry Thornton)	Commander-in-Chief Air Command; 2007–2009	Succeeded by Sir Chris Moran
Honorary titles
Preceded by Sir Joe French	Air Aide-de-Camp to Her Majesty The Queen; 2007–2009	Succeeded by Sir Chris Moran
