= The Woodland Folk =

Book series by Antonio Lupatelli

The Woodland Folk (Italian: Le storie del bosco) is a six part children's book series released between 1983–1984 written and illustrated by Antonio Lupatelli under the pseudonym Tony Wolf.

The titles include:

- Meet the Woodland Folk (1983, Dean, ISBN 978-0603003431)
- The Woodland Folk Meet the Gnomes (1983, Dean, ISBN 978-0603003479)
- The Woodland Folk Meet the Giants (1983, Dean, ISBN 978-0603003448)
- The Woodland Folk Meet the Fairies (1984, Dean, ISBN 978-0603003455), or The Woodland Folk in Fairyland (1984, Rand McNally, ISBN 978-0528825644)
- The Woodland Folk Meet the Elves (1984, Dean, ISBN 978-0603003462)
- The Woodland Folk Meet the Dragons (1984, Dean, ISBN 978-0603003486), or The Woodland Folk in Dragonland (1984, Rand McNally, ISBN 978-0528825668)

== Adaptation ==
The characters inspired an anime television series: Bosco Adventure.
