= Rupert Matthews =

British politician (born 1961)

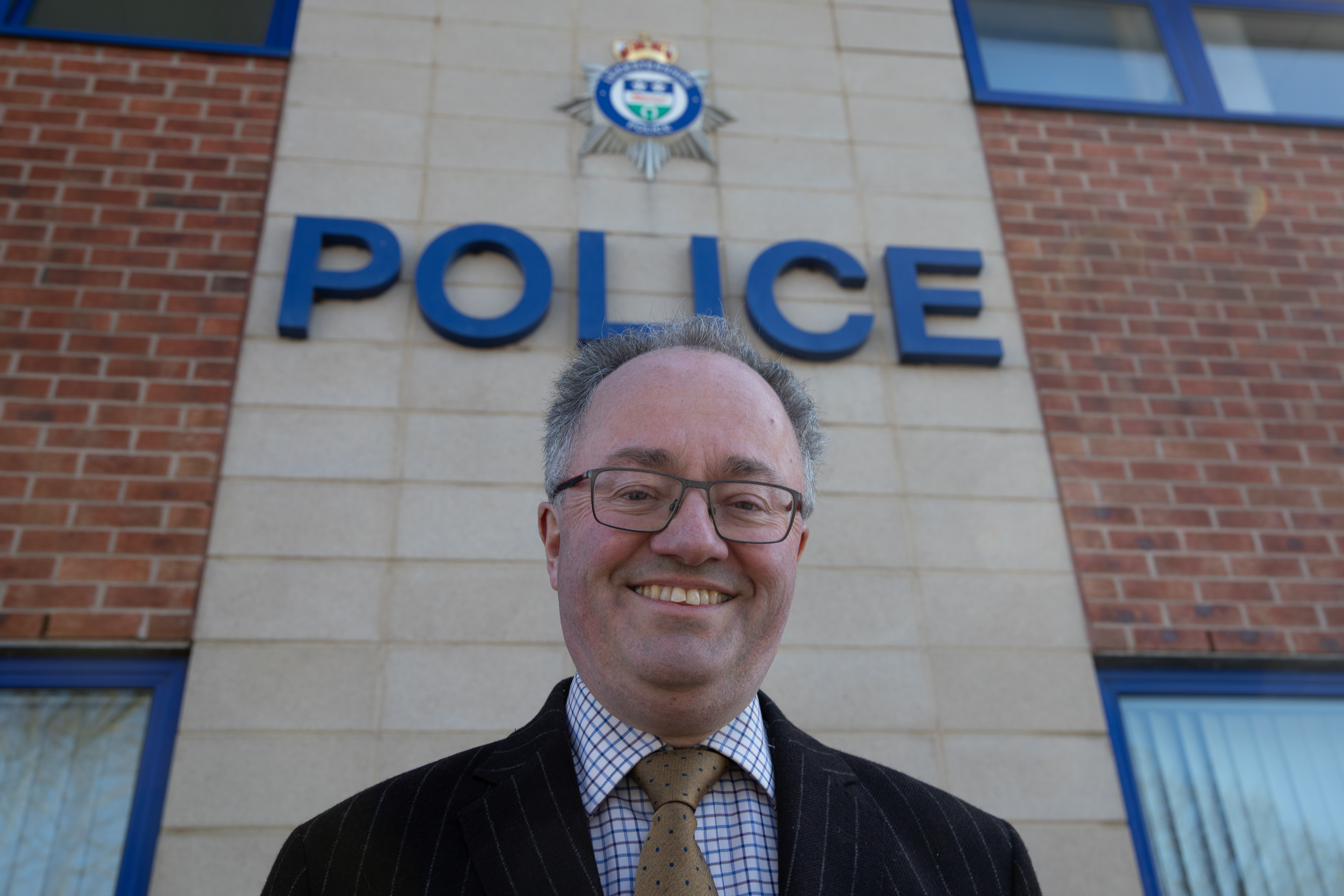

Leicestershire Police and Crime Commissioner
- Incumbent
- Assumed office 13 May 2021
- Preceded by: The Lord Bach

Member of the European Parliament for East Midlands
- In office 29 June 2017 – 1 July 2019
- Preceded by: Andrew Lewer
- Succeeded by: Bill Newton Dunn

Personal details
- Born: 5 December 1961 (age 64)
- Party: Reform UK (2025–present)
- Other political affiliations: Conservative (1984–2025)
- Education: Esher Grammar School
- Occupation: Politician
- Website: rupertmatthews.org.uk

Rupert Oliver Matthews (born 5 December 1961) is a British Reform UK politician serving as the Leicestershire Police and Crime Commissioner since 2021. He was elected as a Conservative Party candidate, initially in 2021 and then re-elected in 2024, before defecting to Reform UK in August 2025. He previously served as a Conservative Member of the European Parliament (MEP) for the East Midlands from June 2017 until his term ended on 1 July 2019, and has authored books on the paranormal.

== Career ==
Matthews was educated at Esher Grammar School and worked as a freelance writer and journalist. He has written over 170 books on history, ghosts, cryptozoology, UFOs, paranormal activity, guides to the UK and children's stories. Matthews is the editorial director and a shareholder of Bretwalda Books.

Matthews has also run an online course about the paranormal for the International Metaphysical University, on whose website he was described as a 'Professor' until mid-January 2012.

== Politics ==
He served as a councillor for St Mark's ward in Surbiton in Kingston upon Thames, and at the 1997 general election he stood for the Conservatives in the safe Labour constituency of Bootle.

Matthews was selected as a Conservative candidate for the 2009 European Parliament election and was placed third on the Conservative party list for the East Midlands. He was not elected.

On 12 October 2011, Roger Helmer, an MEP for the East Midlands constituency, announced that he would resign from the European Parliament at the end of the year. He expected to be replaced by Matthews, who was in next position on the Conservative party list in the East Midlands. However, after uncertainty was expressed as to whether the party would approve Matthews as the new MEP, Helmer announced he would delay standing down until the position was clarified and Matthews confirmed as his successor. The Conservative Party was reported to be looking into the fact that golliwog dolls featured on the front cover of a book on political correctness published by Bretwalda Books. It was later reported that Matthews was not personally involved in publishing the book. In March 2012, Helmer defected to UKIP and remained an MEP; he was re-elected in 2014.

For the 2014 European Parliament election Matthews was again placed third on the Conservative party list for the East Midlands and, again, missed being elected.

In 2014, Matthews took up a position as National Campaigns Director at Better Off Out. He led Better Off Out's campaign for Britain to leave the European Union, liaising with the official campaign (Vote Leave) as well as with Leave.EU and Grassroots Out. During this time, he supervised the production of leaflets, posters and other campaign materials as well as organising their distribution to the public in the run-up to the 2016 European Union membership referendum.

He finally became an MEP for the East Midlands on 29 June 2017, replacing Andrew Lewer after Lewer was elected to the House of Commons. Matthews was not elected in the 2019 European Parliament election.

He reportedly believed at one time that the Treaty of Lisbon could have enabled the European Commission to invade Britain were the country ever to attempt to leave the European Union, or have enabled the commission to request a German panzer (tank) division be sent to London were the situation to warrant it.

Matthews was elected in 2021 as Leicestershire Police and Crime Commissioner for the Conservative Party, succeeding the Labour incumbent, Willy Bach, who was stepping down.

In 2024, Matthews was reelected as Leicestershire Police and Crime Commissioner.

On 4 August 2025, he defected to Reform UK. This was announced at a Reform press conference.

== See also ==
- List of Conservative Party defections to Reform UK

== Selected bibliography ==
- Monster Mysteries with Bernard Long (Hove, England: Wayland, 1988 ISBN 1-85210-354-X)
- The First Settlements with Bernard Long (Hove, England: Wayland, 1990 ISBN 1-85210-769-3)
- Alien Encounters (Chartwell Books, Inc., 2009 ISBN 978-0-7858-2355-1)
