= Church of St Peter and St Paul, Wing =

Church in Wing, Rutland, England

Coordinates: 52°37′02″N 0°40′53″W

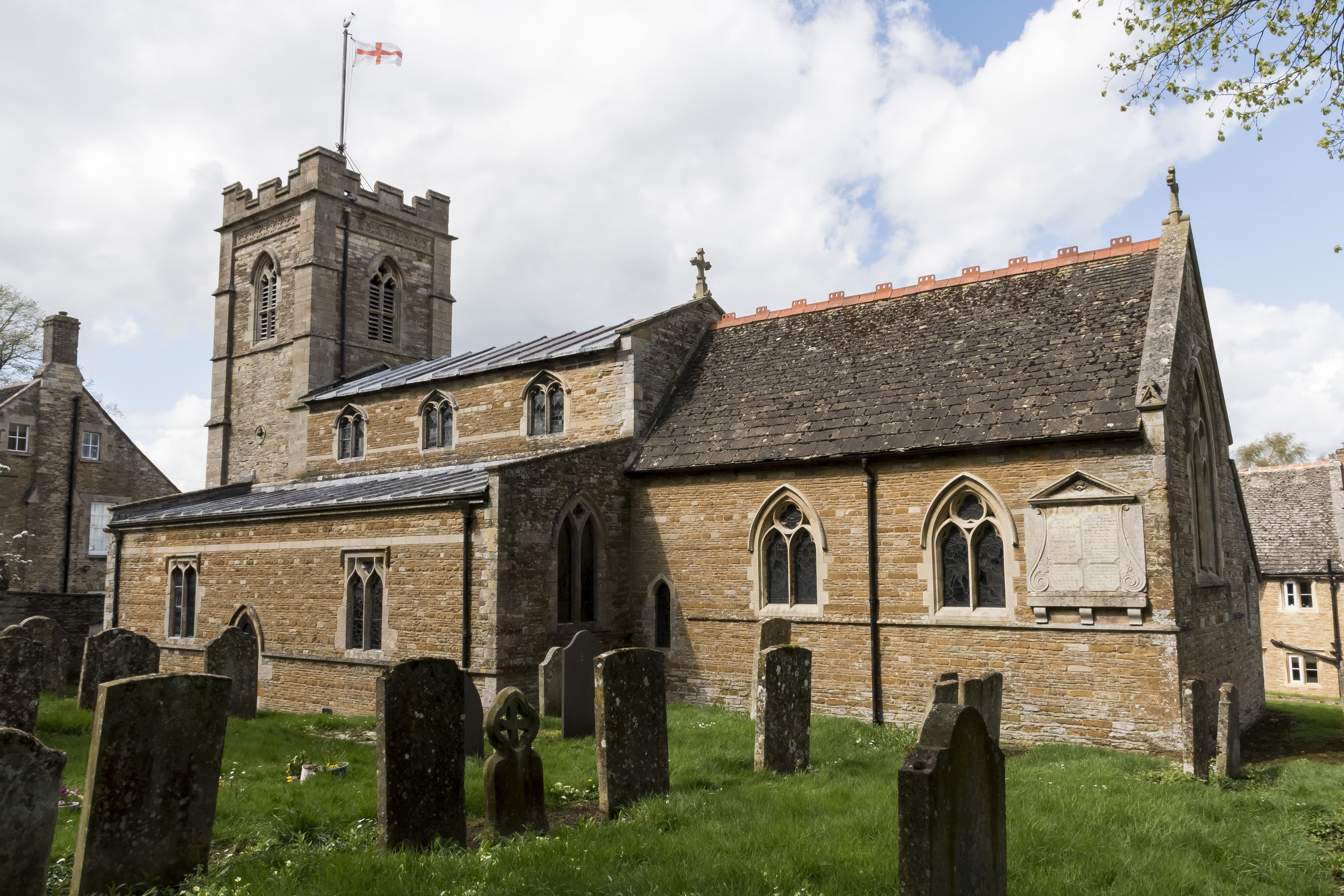
- Denomination: Church of England

History
- Dedication: St Peter, St Paul

Administration
- Diocese: Peterborough
- Parish: Wing, Rutland

The Church of St Peter and St Paul is a church in Wing, Rutland. It is a Grade II* listed building.

== History ==
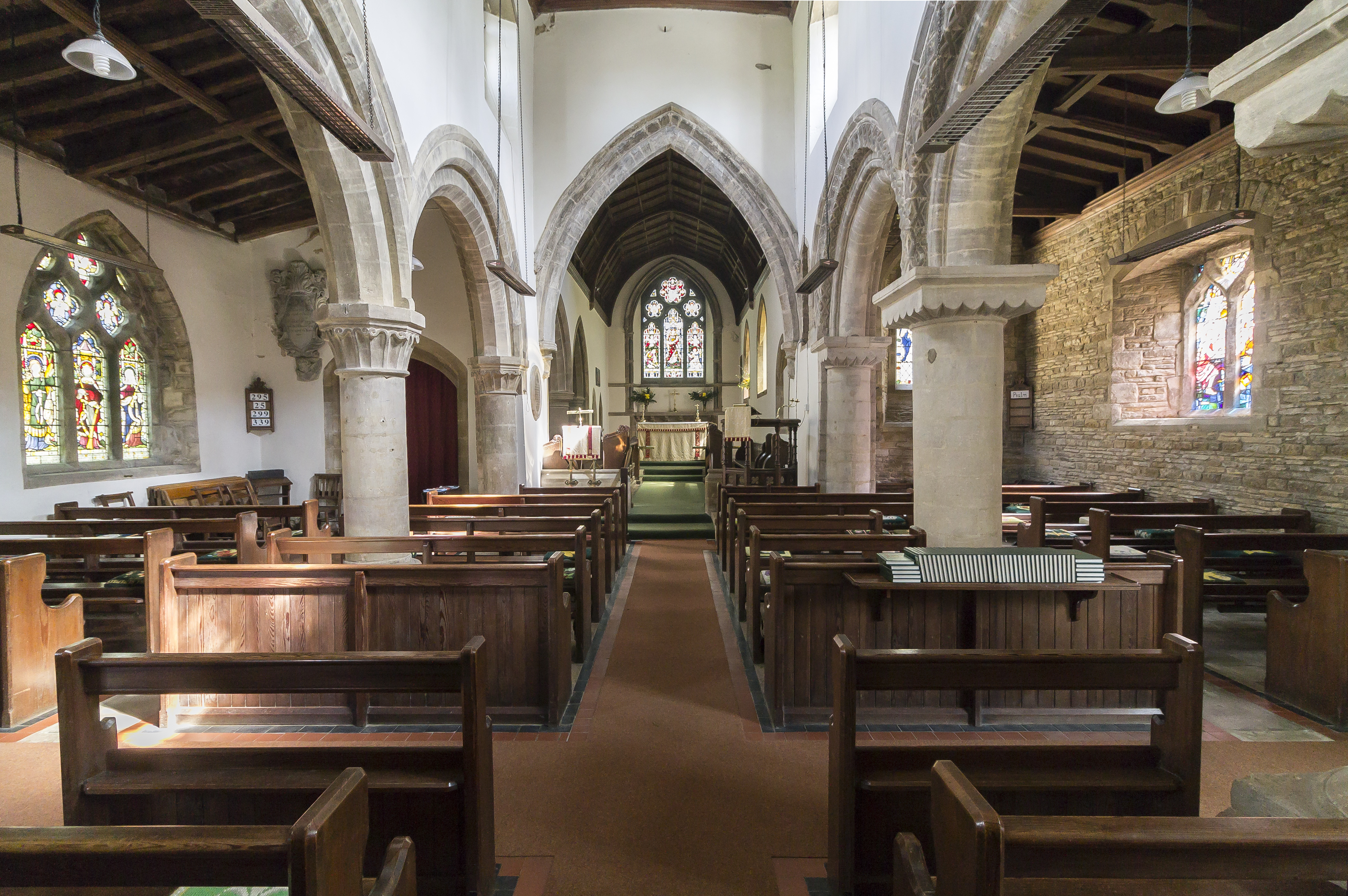
Interior

The church dates from the 12th century. The south aisle was added c1140 and the north in c1180. The tower was added c1390. The spire was removed in 1841 as it was deemed to be unsafe.

The north doorway dates from the 12th century, the chancel arch dates from the 13th century. The piscina and sedilia are 14th century. The church was restored in the Victorian era.

There are visible consecration crosses dating from the 12th century on the altar slab.

Stained glass thought to date from the 14th century is in the vestry. It is fragmented though one part pictures what is thought to be Christ's head.

There is a memorial to the 9 men of the village who died in World War I. Lt A. F. Taverner has a memorial. He died in 1916 of battle wounds.
