= Leicestershire Police and Crime Commissioner =

Government Authority Officials

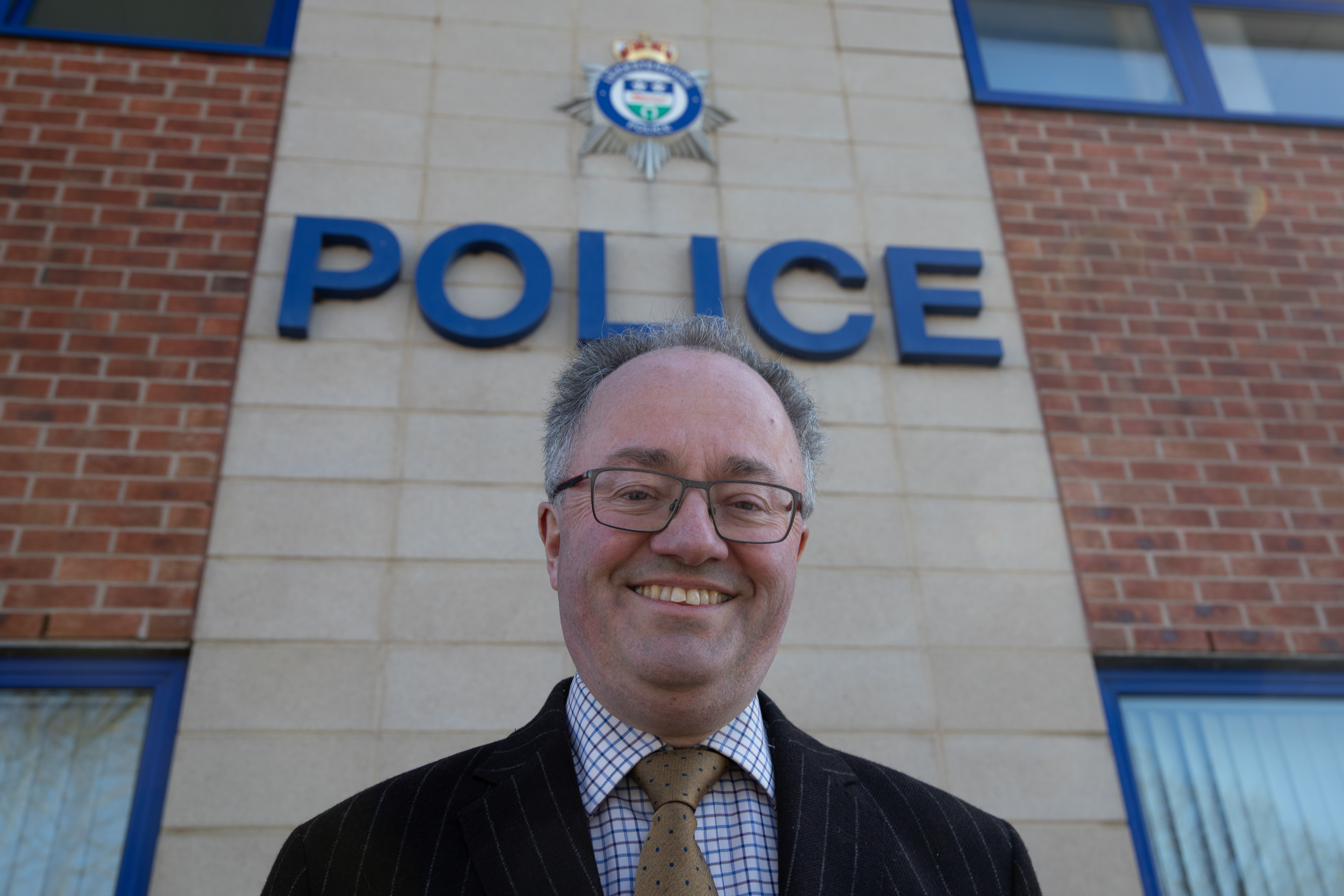
- Incumbent; Rupert Matthews since 13 May 2021
- Police and crime commissioner of Leicestershire Police
- Reports to: Leicestershire Police and Crime Panel
- Appointer: Electorates of Leicestershire and Rutland
- Term length: Four years
- Constituting instrument: Police Reform and Social Responsibility Act 2011
- Precursor: Leicestershire Police Authority
- Inaugural holder: Clive Loader
- Formation: 22 November 2012
- Deputy: Deputy Police and Crime Commissioner
- Salary: £78,400
- Website: www.leics.pcc.police.uk/Home.aspx

The Leicestershire Police and Crime Commissioner (PCC) is the police and crime commissioner, an elected official, tasked with setting out the way crime is tackled by Leicestershire Police in the English counties of Leicestershire and Rutland. The post was created in November 2012, following an election held on 15 November 2012, and replaced the Leicestershire Police Authority. The current incumbent is Rupert Matthews, who was elected as a Conservative Party candidate, but defected to Reform UK in August 2025.

Voting in the 2024 Leicestershire PCC election used the first past the post voting system. Earlier PCC elections had used the supplementary vote system; however, this was abolished with the passing of the Elections Act 2022. PCC will be abolished in May 2028

== List of Leicestershire Police and Crime Commissioners ==
Name	Party	Term of Office	
Clive Loader	Conservative	22 November 2012	11 May 2016
Willy Bach	Labour	12 May 2016	12 May 2021
Rupert Matthews	Conservative	13 May 2021	4 August 2025
Rupert Matthews	Reform	4 August 2025	Present

== Elections ==
=== 2012 ===
2012 Leicestershire Police and Crime Commissioner election
Party	Candidate	1st round		2nd round			1st round votesTransfer votes, 2nd round
Party	Candidate	Total	Of round	Transfers	Total	Of round	1st round votesTransfer votes, 2nd round
Conservative	Clive Loader	59,915	48.43%	4,746	64,661	55.5%	
Labour	Sarah Russell	42,503	34.36%	9,332	51,835	44.5%	
Independent	Suleman Nagdi	21,292	17.21%				
Turnout		123,710	15.92%				
Rejected ballots		3,371	2.65%				
Total votes		127,081	16.36				
Registered electors		776,925					
Conservative win							

=== 2016 ===
2016 Leicestershire Police and Crime Commissioner election
Party	Candidate	1st round		2nd round			1st round votesTransfer votes, 2nd round
Party	Candidate	Total	Of round	Transfers	Total	Of round	1st round votesTransfer votes, 2nd round
Labour	Willy Bach	67,991	44.7%	10,197	78,188	57.3%	
Conservative	Neil Bannister	46,958	30.9%	11,347	58,305	42.7%	
Liberal Democrats	Sarah Hill	19,359	12.7%				
UKIP	David Sprason	17,815	11.7%				
Turnout		152,123	19.8%				
Rejected ballots							
Total votes							
Registered electors							
Labour gain from Conservative							

=== 2021 ===
2021 Leicestershire police and crime commissioner election
Party	Candidate	1st round		2nd round			1st round votesTransfer votes, 2nd round
Party	Candidate	Total	Of round	Transfers	Total	Of round	1st round votesTransfer votes, 2nd round
Conservative	Rupert Matthews	121,252	49.27%	14,314	135,566	57.01%	
Labour	Ross Willmott	81,898	33.28%	20,313	102,211	42.99%	
Liberal Democrats	James Moore	42,951	17.45%				
Turnout		253,487	31.11%				
Total votes		253,487					
Conservative gain from Labour							

=== 2024 ===
2024 Leicestershire police and crime commissioner election
Party	Candidate	Votes	%	±%
Conservative	Rupert Matthews	62,280	35.3	−14.0
Labour Co-op	Rory Palmer	61,420	34.8	+1.5
Green	Aasiya Bora	23,649	13.4	N/A
Liberal Democrats	Ian Sharpe	22,041	12.5	−5.0
One Leicester	Fizza Askari	7,104	4.0	N/A
Turnout		176,494	21.7	
Conservative hold		Swing		
