= Antonio Lupatelli =

Italian illustrator and writer (1930–2018)

- Born: before 18 May 1930; Busseto, Emilia-Romagna, Kingdom of Italy
- Died: 18 May 2018 (aged 88); Cremona, Lombardy, Italy
- Other names: Tony Wolf; Oda Taro; L'Alpino; Antony Moore
- Children: Matteo Lupatelli

Antonio Lupatelli (1930 – 18 May 2018) was an Italian illustrator, comics artist and writer who worked under the pseudonym of Tony Wolf.

== Life and career ==
Lupatelli is best known for his illustrations of children's books, working with Fratelli Fabbri Editori, Payot Film, Fleetway Publications, and Dami Editore. As a comics artist, he was one of several artist to draw for Fleetway's children's magazines Playhour and Jack and Jill. Among the series he worked on were Freddie Frog, Fun in Toyland, Little Sooty and Moony of the Moon. He created the characters Ciccio Sprai and Robi e Robo for the Italian magazine Il Corriere dei Piccoli. He also made graphic contributions to the book adaptations of the Swiss claymation TV series Pingu.

Lupatelli's son is the illustrator Matteo Lupatelli, also known as Matt Wolf.

== Notable works ==
=== Illustrator ===
- Pinocchio, Dami Editore, 2002
- Le storie del bosco (The Woodland Folk series, which he also wrote)
- On the Farm, Running Press Kids, 2005
- In the City, Running Press Kids, Brdbk edition, 2005
